= List of songs produced by Rico Love =

This is a list of songs produced by American rapper & producer Rico Love.

== Songwriting and Production credits ==
- "All Because Of You" by Marques Houston (feat. Young Rome)
- "I Wasn't Ready" by Marques Houston
- "I Wish" by Omarion later done by Danity Kane
- "I'm Gon Change" by Omarion
- "U Got Me" by B5
- "I Bet" by TLC (duet with O'so Krispie, the winner of R U the Girl)
- "Seen the Light" by Chris Brown (featuring Rico Love)
- "Baby it's You" by Donell Jones
- "Could This Be Love" by One Chance
- "Smile" by Lea
- "Click, Flash" by Ciara
- "Energy" by Keri Hilson
- "Love Like This" by Natasha Bedingfield (featuring Sean Kingston)
- "Sweet Dreams" by Beyoncé
- "Radio" by Beyoncé
- "Hello Heartbreak" by Michelle Williams
- "The Greatest" by Michelle Williams
- "Lucky Girl" by Michelle Williams
- "Angel" by Natasha Bedingfield
- "Year of the Lover" by Lloyd
- "Your Love" by Pleasure P
- "Boyfriend No. 2" by Pleasure P
- "Shone" by Flo Rida (feat. Pleasure P)
- "Tender Roni (Handcuffin')" by Pleasure P
- "Let Me" by Pleasure P
- "Sayin My Name" by Pleasure P
- "Thinkin' About You" by Mario
- "Soundtrack to My Broken Heart" by Mario
- "Get Out" by Mario
- "Ooh Baby" by Mario
- "Swag Back" by Amerie (produced by Jim Jonsin, co-produced by Rico Love)
- "Hey Daddy (Daddy's Home)" by Usher (featuring Plies)
- "There Goes My Baby" by Usher
- "In My Bag" by Usher (featuring T.I.)
- "Making Love (Into The Night)" by Usher
- "Straight to the Dance Floor" by Jamie Foxx (featuring Lil' Wayne)
- "So Many Girls" (Produced by Danja, Written by Rico Love) by Usher
- "Hello Good Morning" (Produced by Danja, Written by Rico Love) by Dirty Money
- "Commander" (Produced by David Guetta, written by Rico Love) by Kelly Rowland
- "Gone" by Nelly feat. Kelly Rowland
- "Just A Dream" by Nelly
- "The Kids" (written by Rico Love) by B.o.B
- "All Night Long" by Alexandra Burke featuring Pitbull
- "Castle Made of Sand" (Produced by DJ Frank E, co-produced by Rico Love) by Pitbull featuring Kelly Rowland and Jamie Drastik
- "Making Movies" by Nelly
- "Don't It Feel Good" by Nelly featuring Rico Love
- "Nothing Without Her" by Nelly
- "k.I.s.s (Feat. Diddy-Dirty Money & Murphy Lee)" by Nelly
- "Scream" by Tank
- "Freak" (featuring Rico Love) by Jamie Foxx (Produced with Danja)
- "All Aboard (featuring Lil' Wayne)" by Romeo Santos
- "Ball" (featuring Lil Wayne) by T.I.
- "Up In It" by Wiz Khalifa
- "Grownups" (featuring Rico Love & Mase) by French Montana (Prod. by Rico Love)
- "Long Live A$AP" by A$AP Rocky (Prod. by Jim Jonsin & Rico Love)

== Single's Songwriter credits ==
Year	Single	Chart positions						Album
Year	Single	US Hot 100	US R&B/Hip-Hop	US Rap	US Pop	US Dance	UK	Album
2005	"All Because of You" (Marques Houston featuring Young Rome)	69	14	–	–	–	–	Naked
2007	"I Wish You Loved Me" (Tynisha Keli)	–	113	–	–	–	–	The Chronicles of Tk
2007	"Love Like This" (Natasha Bedingfield featuring Sean Kingston)	11	–	–	10	1	20	Pocket Full Of Sunshine
2008	"Energy" (Keri Hilson)	–	–	–	–	–	43	In a Perfect World...
2008	"Labels or Love" (Fergie)	89	–	–	–	–	56	Sex and the City: Original Motion Picture Soundtrack
2008	"The Greatest" (Michelle Williams)	–	–	–	–	1	–	Unexpected
2008	"Year of the Lover" (Lloyd featuring Plies)	–	101	–	–	–	–	Lessons in Love
2008	"Boyfriend No. 2" (Pleasure P)	42	2	–	–	–	–	The Introduction of Marcus Cooper
2008	"Hello Heartbreak" (Michelle Williams)	–	–	–	–	8	–	Unexpected
2009	"Shone" (Flo Rida featuring Pleasure P)	57	81	–	–	–	–	R.O.O.T.S.
2009	"Sweet Dreams" (Beyoncé)	10	48	–	2	1	5	I Am… Sasha Fierce
2009	"Thinkin' About You" (Mario)	–	45	–	–	–	–	D.N.A.
2009	"Somebody to Love" (Leighton Meester featuring Robin Thicke)	111	–	–	–	–	–	Love Is a Drug
2009	"Hey Daddy (Daddy's Home)" (Usher featuring Plies)	24	2	–	60	–	–	Raymond v. Raymond
2010	"Ooh Baby" (Mario)	95	–	–	–	–	–	D.N.A.
2010	"Hello Good Morning" (Diddy – Dirty Money featuring T.I.)	27	13	8	59	–	22	Last Train to Paris
2010	"All Night Long" (Alexandra Burke featuring Pitbull)	–	–	–	–	–	4	Overcome
2010	"Commander" (Kelly Rowland)	–	–	–	–	1	9	Here I Am
2010	"There Goes My Baby" (Usher)	25	1	–	–	–	138	Raymond v. Raymond
2010	"Just a Dream" (Nelly)	3	–	6	2	–	8	5.0
2011								5.0
2011	"Gone" (Nelly featuring Kelly Rowland)	113	55	–	–	–	58	
2011	"Motivation" (Kelly Rowland featuring Lil Wayne)	17	1	–	24	–	169	Here I Am
2011	"Promise" (Romeo Santos featuring Usher)	83	–	–	–	–	–	Formula, Vol. 1
2011	"Mr. Wrong" (Mary J. Blige featuring Drake)	87	10	–	–	–	–	My Life II... The Journey Continues (Act 1)
2011	"The Walls" (Mario featuring Fabolous)	–	58	–	–	–	–	
2012	"Heart Attack" (Trey Songz)	39	3	–	–	–	28	Chapter 5
2012	"Touch'N You" (Rick Ross featuring Usher)	102	15	15	–	–	–	God Forgives, I Don't
2012	"Balcony" (Cassie featuring Young Jeezy)	–	–	–	–	–	–	King of Hearts
2012	"Live It Up" (Tulisa Contostavlos featuring Tyga)	–	–	–	–	–	12	The Female Boss
2012	"Representin" (Ludacris featuring Kelly Rowland)	97	28	20	–	–	–	Ludaversal
2012	"Ball" (T.I. featuring Lil Wayne)	50	10	11	–	–	–	Trouble Man: Heavy is the Head
2012	"Hardly Breathing" (Brandy)	–	–	–	–	–	-	Two Eleven
2012	"4 AM" (Melanie Fiona)	81	8	–	–	–	–	The MF Life
2013	"Long Live A$AP" (A$AP Rocky)	86	27	21	–	–	–	LONG.LIVE.A$AP
2013	"Ain't Worried About Nothin'" (French Montana)	63	18	14	–	–	–	Excuse My French
2017	"Playboy" (Trey Songz)	–	–	–	–	–	–	Tremaine
2017	"California Heaven" (JAHKOY)	–	–	–	–	–	–	Foreign Water
2018	"Twerk" (City Girls featuring Cardi B)	29	14	–	–	–	–	Girl Code

=== Songwriting Guest appearances ===
List of non-single guest appearances, with other performing artists, showing year released and album name
Title	Year	Other performer(s)	Album
"Break 'em Off for Life"	2003	Bone Crusher, Hezo, Dano, Jack Frost	AttenCHUN!
"Gotta Getcha" (Remix)	2005	Jermaine Dupri, Usher	Young, Fly & Flashy, Vol. 1
"I'm So"	2006	Le'Che Martin	Let's
"Get Away"	2006	Le'Che Martin	Let's
"That's Me"	2006	Omarion	21
"Look At Her" (Remix)	2007	One Chance, Fabo	Private
"Take A Chance"	2007	One Chance	Private
"Aloha"	2009	Fat Joe, Pleasure P	Jealous Ones Still Envy 2 (J.O.S.E. 2)
"I'm Out Here"	2009	Juvenile	Cocky & Confident
"We Like"	2010	Rich Boy, Pleasure P	Buried Alive
"Makin' Movies"	2010	Nelly	5.0
"Don't It Feel Good"	2010	Nelly	5.0
"Freak"	2010	Jamie Foxx	Best Night of My Life
"Lay Me Down"	2010	T.I.	No Mercy
"All Of The Night"	2011	Kelly Rowland	Here I Am
"Dedication"	2012	Brisco	Fruits Of My Labor
"Actin' Up"	2012	Meek Mill, Wale, French Montana	Self Made Vol. 2
"I Do This"	2012	Trae Tha Truth, T.I., DJ Khaled	The Blackprint
"Ball"	2012	T.I., Lil Wayne	Trouble Man
"Keep Calm"	2013	DJ Kay Slay, Juicy J, Jadakiss, 2 Chainz	Rhyme or Die
