= Michelle Williams discography =

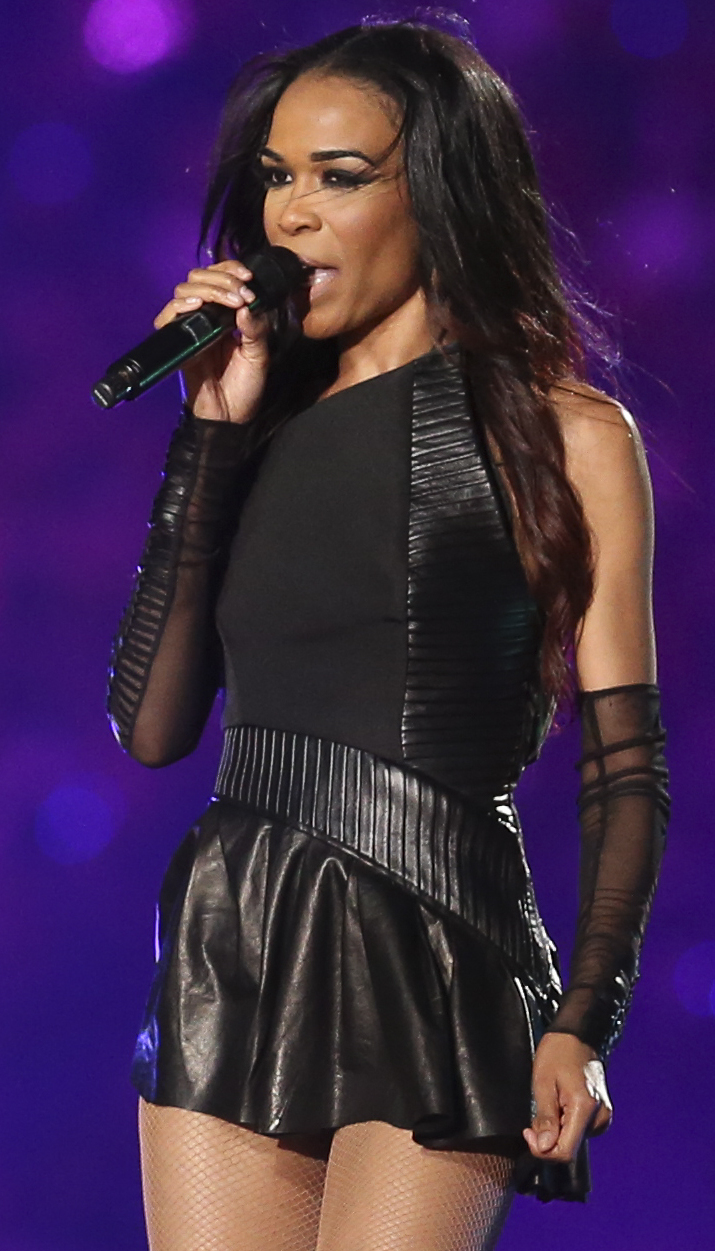
- Williams performing at the Super Bowl XLVII halftime show.
- Studio albums: 4
- Soundtrack albums: 1
- Compilation albums: 1
- Singles: 10
- Music videos: 16

American gospel and R&B singer-songwriter Michelle Williams has released four studio albums, one compilation album and ten singles.

Williams' began her career in 1999 as a backing vocalist for Grammy Award-winning R&B recording artist Monica and in 2000 a member of one of the best-selling American bands of all time, Destiny's Child, who have sold approximately 60 million records worldwide. She released her first solo album Heart to Yours (2002), during the hiatus of Destiny's Child, making her the first member of the band to do so. The album topped the US Gospel Albums chart, and peaked at number eleven on the Top R&B/Hip-Hop Albums chart and fifty seven on the Billboard 200. The album won Williams an award for "Best Gospel Act" at the 2002 MOBO Awards and spawned the single "Heard a Word" which was featured on the platinum-certified WOW Gospel 2003 compilation album. As of 2008, Heart to Yours has sold over 220,000 copies in the US.

In 2004, after making her on-stage acting debut the previous year in the Broadway musical Aida, Williams released her second studio album Do You Know which peaked at number two on the Gospel Albums chart, number three on the Christian Albums chart and number twenty-eight on the Top R&B/Hip-Hop Albums chart. Do You Know gained Williams a nomination for "Best Gospel Act" at the 2004 MOBO Awards and spawned a same-titled single which was included on Live in Atlanta. As of 2008, Do You Know has sold over 78,000 copies in the US.

Williams' third album and pop debut Unexpected (2008) debuted at number forty-two and eleven on the Billboard 200 and Top R&B/Hip-Hop Albums charts respectively. Unexpected also spawned the singles "We Break the Dawn", which topped the US Hot Dance Airplay chart and was a moderate top 50 success in the UK and Hungary; "The Greatest", which topped the US Dance chart; and "Hello Heartbreak". "The Greatest" is ranked number thirty-nine on the US Billboard Dance Club Songs decade-end (2000-2009) chart. As of 2013, Unexpected has sold over 34,000 copies in the US. In 2011, Williams gained her third top 20 hit on the US Dance chart when Ultra Naté released a joint collaboration with her titled "Waiting on You", which peaked at number eleven.

In 2014, Williams released her fourth studio album Journey to Freedom which debuted at number twenty-nine on the Billboard 200 and became her second number two debut on US Gospel Albums; featuring the singles "If We Had Your Eyes", which reached the top 20 of the US Adult R&B Songs chart; "Fire" and ""Say Yes", which topped the US Hot Gospel Songs chart for seven weeks. "Say Yes" also appeared on the Billboard Hot Gospel Songs year-end charts for two consecutive years, at number seven and twenty-three in 2014 and 2015, respectively. In 2019, Billboard ranked "Say Yes" number fifty on the decade-end (2010-2019) Hot Gospel Songs chart.

== Albums ==
=== Studio albums ===
List of albums, with selected chart positions and sales figures
Title	Album details	Peak chart positions								Sales
Title	Album details	US	US R&B /HH	US Gospel	US Christ.	US Indie	JPN	UK Christ. & Gospel	UK R&B	Sales
Heart to Yours	Released: April 16, 2002; Label: Sanctuary, Columbia (#5082432000); Formats: CD, cassette, digital download	57	17	1	3	—	—	—	—	World: 500,000 (Note: Worldwide sales figure for Heart to Yours, as of 2014.); US: 220,000 (Note: United States sales figure for Heart to Yours, as of 2008.); UK: 3,200 (Note: United Kingdom sales figure for Heart to Yours, as of 2003.)
Do You Know	Released: January 26, 2004; Labels: Sanctuary, Columbia (#5151152000); Formats: CD, digital download	120	28	2	3	—	—	—	—	US: 78,000 (Note: United States sales figure for Do You Know, as of 2008.); UK: 3,904 (Note: United Kingdom sales figure for Do You Know, as of 2008.)
Unexpected	Released: October 7, 2008; Labels: Music World, Columbia (#88697357022); Formats: CD, LP, digital download	42	11	—	—	—	115	—	38	US: 34,000 (Note: United States sales figure for Unexpected, as of 2013.)
Journey to Freedom	Released: September 9, 2014; Labels: Light, eOne (#LIG-CD-7278); Formats: CD, digital download	29	—	2	—	7	—	6	—	

=== Compilation albums ===
List of albums, with selected details
Title	Album details
Heart to Yours / Do You Know	Released: October 31, 2006; Labels: Sanctuary, Columbia; Formats: CD, digital download

=== Karaoke albums ===
List of albums, with selected details
Title	Album details
Do You Know	Released: 2020; Labels: Music World; Formats: Streaming

== Singles ==
=== As a lead artist ===
List of singles, with selected chart positions, showing year released and album name
Title	Year	Peak chart positions										Album
Title	Year	US Bub.	US Dance	US Gospel	US Adult R&B	CIS	FRA	HUN	NLD	SUR	UK	Album
"Heard a Word"	2002	—	—	—	—	—	—	—	—	—	—	Heart to Yours
"Do You Know"	2004	—	—	—	—	—	—	—	—	—	—	Do You Know
"My Only Love is You"	2004	—	—	—	—	—	—	—	—	—	—	Do You Know
"We Break the Dawn"	2008	—	4	—	—	161	—	38	—	—	47	Unexpected
"The Greatest"	2008	—	1	—	—	—	—	—	—	—	—	Unexpected
"Hello Heartbreak"	2008	—	— (Note: "Hello Heartbreak" did not enter Billboard Hot Dance Club Songs, but peaked at number 8 on the US Dance/Electronic Singles Sales chart.)	—	—	—	—	—	—	—	— (Note: "Hello Heartbreak" did not enter the UK Singles Chart, but charted on numerous Music Week club charts; peaking at number 6 on the UK Commercial Pop Top 30, number 15 on the UK Upfront Club Top 40 and number 29 on the UK Urban Top 30 chart.)	Unexpected
"Waiting on You" (with Ultra Naté)	2011	—	11	—	—	—	—	—	—	—	—	Hero Worship
"If We Had Your Eyes"	2013	—	—	22	19	—	—	—	—	—	—	Journey to Freedom
"Fire"	2013	—	—	—	—	—	—	—	—	—	—	Journey to Freedom
"Say Yes" (featuring Beyoncé and Kelly Rowland)	2014	9	—	1	—	—	90	—	114	4	106	Journey to Freedom
"Believe in Me"	2015	—	—	—	—	—	—	—	—	—	—	Journey to Freedom
"Fearless"	2018	—	—	—	—	—	—	—	—	—	—	Non-album single
"God With Us" (with Kenny Lattimore)	2026	—	—	—	—	—	—	—	—	—	—	God With Us
"—" denotes items which were not released in that country or failed to chart.

=== As a featured artist ===
List of featured singles, showing year released and album name
Title	Year	Peak chart positions	Album
Title	Year	UK	Album
"Prayer Song" (Kim Burrell featuring Michelle Williams, Musiq Soulchild, Krishnar Lewis, James Hall, Lil' Mo & Tye Tribbett)	2010	—	Non-album single
"Simply Amazing" (Todd Dulaney featuring Michelle Williams)	2011	—	Pulling Me Through
"On the Run" (Electric Giant Beatz featuring Michelle Williams)	2011	— (Note: "On the Run" did not enter the UK Singles Chart, but charted at number 4 on the Music Week UK Commercial Pop Top 30 club chart.)	Non-album single

=== Soundtrack and promotional singles ===
List of promotional singles, showing year released and album name
Title	Year	Album
"Sun Will Shine Again"	2002	Heart to Yours
"Let's Stay Together"	2005	Roll Bounce
"Let's Stay Together (The Remix King Soul Mix)"	2005	Boogie Oogie Oogie (single by Brooke Valentine)
"Love Gun"	2011	Non-album single

== Other charted and certified songs ==
List of non-single songs, with selected chart positions and certifications, showing year released and album name
Title	Year	Peak chart positions				Certifications	Sales	Albums
Title	Year	US R&B Digital	US R&R CRSP	KOR (Int.)	UK Cross Rhyt.	Certifications	Sales	Albums
"Rock With Me"	2002	—	—	—	— (Note: "Rock With Me" was ranked number 21 on the Cross Rhythms year-end Top 100 Chart for 2002.)			Heart to Yours
"Heart to Yours"	2002	—	6	—	— (Note: "Heart To Yours" was ranked number 26 on the Cross Rhythms year-end Top 100 Chart for 2002.)			Heart to Yours
"Purpose In Your Storm"	2004	—	—	—	1			Do You Know
"You Changed" (Kelly Rowland featuring Beyoncé and Michelle Williams)	2013	16	—	20	—		KOR: 16,034	Talk a Good Game
"Need Your Help" (featuring Eric Dawkins)	2014	—	—	—	1			Journey To Freedom
"Say My Name" (Beyoncé featuring Kelly Rowland and Michelle Williams)	2019	—	—	—	—	PMB: Gold		Homecoming: The Live Album
"Lose My Breath" (Beyoncé featuring Kelly Rowland and Michelle Williams)	2019	—	—	—	—	PMB: Gold		Homecoming: The Live Album

== Guest appearances ==
List of non-single guest appearances, with other performing artists, showing year released and album name
Title	Year	Other artist(s)	Album	Ref.
"Steal Away to Jesus"	2001	Shirley Caesar	Hymns	
"Will You Still Love Me?"	2003	Urban Knights	Urban Knights V	
"Dangerously in Love 2" (Note: Williams is credited for background vocals.)	2003	Beyoncé	Dangerously in Love	
"Interlude (Spoken)"	2004	Ramiyah	Ramiyah	
"Do You Know (Live in Atlanta)"	2006	—N/a	Spirit Rising Vol. 1 & 2	
"New Song"	2009	Jeannette Bayardelle	Transferable	
"By Your Side"	2009	Kanye West, Malik Yusef	G.O.O.D. Morning, G.O.O.D. Night	
"More Like You"	2010	Deitrick Haddon, Voices of Unity	Blessed & Cursed	
"Katya"	2011	Idle Warship	Habits of the Heart	
"You Changed"	2013	Kelly Rowland, Beyoncé	Talk a Good Game	
"Superpower" (Note: Williams is credited for background vocals.)	2013	Beyoncé, Frank Ocean	Beyoncé	
"Ocean Blue"	2016	Papa San	Journey	
"Southern Belle"	2017	Sir the Baptist	Saint or Sinner	
"Lose My Breath"	2019	Beyoncé, Kelly Rowland	Homecoming: The Live Album	
"Say My Name"	2019	Beyoncé, Kelly Rowland	Homecoming: The Live Album	
"Soldier"	2019	Beyoncé, Kelly Rowland	Homecoming: The Live Album	
"I'll Never Be the Same"	2020	—N/a	Revival!	
"If You Want Perfection"	2024	Death Becomes Her Original Broadway Cast	Death Becomes Her - Broadway Sneak Preview	
"Prelude"	2025	Death Becomes Her Original Broadway Cast	Death Becomes Her (Original Broadway Cast Recording)	
"If You Want Perfection"	2025	Death Becomes Her Original Broadway Cast	Death Becomes Her (Original Broadway Cast Recording)	
"Falling Apart"	2025	Megan Hilty, Lauren Celentano, Ximone Rose	Death Becomes Her (Original Broadway Cast Recording)	
"Siempre Viva"	2025	Megan Hilty, Death Becomes Her Original Broadway Cast	Death Becomes Her (Original Broadway Cast Recording)	
"Don't Say I Didn't (Warn You)"	2025	Death Becomes Her Original Broadway Cast	Death Becomes Her (Original Broadway Cast Recording)	
"Live to Serve"	2025	Taurean Everett, Death Becomes Her Original Broadway Cast	Death Becomes Her (Original Broadway Cast Recording)	
"Siempre Viva (Reprise)"	2025	Christopher Sieber, Megan Hilty, Jennifer Simard, Death Becomes Her Original Broadway Cast	Death Becomes Her (Original Broadway Cast Recording)	
"The End"	2025	Jennifer Simard, Megan Hilty, Death Becomes Her Original Broadway Cast	Death Becomes Her (Original Broadway Cast Recording)	

== Songwriting discography ==
List of releases by other performing artists where Michelle Williams is a credited songwriter
Title	Year	Co-writer(s)	Artist(s)	Album	Ref.
"Outro (DC-3) Thank You"	2001	Beyoncé Knowles, Kelly Rowland, Rob Fusari, Calvin Gaines, Bill Lee	Destiny's Child	Survivor	
"O' Holy Night"	2001	Placide Cappeau, Adolphe Adam, Erron Williams, Kim Burse	Destiny's Child	8 Days of Christmas	
"Lose My Breath"	2004	Kelly Rowland, Beyoncé Knowles, Sean Garrett, LaShawn Daniels, Rodney Jerkins, Fred Jerkins, Shawn Carter	Destiny's Child	Destiny Fulfilled	
"Soldier"	2004	Kelly Rowland, Beyoncé Knowles, Sean Garrett, Rich Harrison, Dwayne Carter, Clifford Harris	Destiny's Child, T.I., Lil Wayne	Destiny Fulfilled	
"Cater 2 U"	2004	Kelly Rowland, Beyoncé Knowles, Rodney Jerkins, Ric Rude, Robert Waller	Destiny's Child	Destiny Fulfilled	
"T-Shirt"	2004	Kelly Rowland, Beyoncé Knowles, Sean Garrett, Angela Beyincé, Andre Harris, Vidal Davis	Destiny's Child	Destiny Fulfilled	
"Is She the Reason"	2004	Kelly Rowland, Beyoncé Knowles, Sean Garrett, Patrick Douthit, Victor Carstarphen, Gene McFadden, John Whitehead	Destiny's Child	Destiny Fulfilled	
"Girl"	2004	Kelly Rowland, Beyoncé Knowles, Sean Garrett, Patrick Douthit, Angela Beyincé, Don Davis, Eddie Robinson	Destiny's Child	Destiny Fulfilled	
"If"	2004	Kelly Rowland, Beyoncé Knowles, Dana Stinson, Big Drawers, Charles Jackson, Marvin Yancy	Destiny's Child	Destiny Fulfilled	
"Free"	2004	Kelly Rowland, Beyoncé Knowles, Dana Stinson, Big Drawers, Larry Mizell, Fonce Mizell, James Carter	Destiny's Child	Destiny Fulfilled	
"Through with Love"	2004	Kelly Rowland, Beyoncé Knowles, Sean Garrett, Mario Winans	Destiny's Child	Destiny Fulfilled	
"Love"	2004	Kelly Rowland, Beyoncé Knowles, Angela Beyincé, Erron Williams	Destiny's Child	Destiny Fulfilled	
"Game Over"	2004	Kelly Rowland, Beyoncé Knowles, Sean Garrett, Patrick Douthit, Michael Burton, Phil Terry	Destiny's Child	Destiny Fulfilled	
"Got's My Own"	2004	Kelly Rowland, Beyoncé Knowles, Sean Garrett, LaShawn Daniels, Rodney Jerkins, Fred Jerkins, Angela Beyincé	Destiny's Child	Destiny Fulfilled	
"Why You Actin'"	2004	Kelly Rowland, Beyoncé Knowles, Paul Allen, James Moss, Marcus Divine	Destiny's Child	Destiny Fulfilled	
"2 Step"	2004	Kelly Rowland, Beyoncé Knowles, Robert Waller, Scott Storch, Stephen Garrett	Destiny's Child	Destiny Fulfilled	
"Feel the Same Way I Do"	2005	Kelly Rowland, Beyoncé Knowles, LaShawn Daniels, Rodney Jerkins, Fred Jerkins, Ricky Lewis	Destiny's Child	#1's	
"Grillz"	2005	Cornell Haynes, Jr., Jermaine Mauldin, Ali Jones, Cameron Gipp, James Phillips, Paul Slayton, Kelly Rowland, Beyoncé Knowles, Sean Garrett, Rich Harrison, Dwayne Carter, Clifford Harris	Nelly, Paul Wall, Ali & Gipp	Sweatsuit	
"Kiss Me"	2006	Ryan Leslie, Kelly Rowland, Beyoncé Knowles, Sean Garrett, Angela Beyincé, Andre Harris, Vidal Davis	Cassie	Cassie	
"You Will Win"	2007	Sheléa Melody Frazier, Damion D. Washington, James Quenton Wright	Kelly Rowland	Spirits Rising Vol. 1 & 2	
"Body Marked Up"	2008	William Kenneth Adams, Shaun Mathew Verreault, Kelly Rowland, Beyoncé Knowles, Sean Garrett, Rich Harrison, Dwayne Carter, Clifford Harris	Willy Northpole	Tha Connect	
"Katya"	2011	Farhad Samadzada, Talib Kweli Greene, Kendra Janelle Ross	Idle Warship, Michelle Williams	Habits of the Heart	
"Nuclear"	2013	Joseph A. Bereal, James Edward Fauntleroy, Pharrell L. Williams	Destiny's Child	Love Songs	
"The Girl Is Mine"	2015	Brandy Norwood, LaShawn Daniels, Fred Jerkins, Rodney Jerkins, Japhe Tejeda, Kelly Rowland, Beyoncé Knowles, Sean Garrett, Patrick Douthit, Angela Beyincé, Don Davis, Eddie Robinson	99 Souls, Destiny's Child, Brandy	—N/a	
"Ocean Blue"	2016	Tasan Alanna Thompson, Simmie Ty Thiam	Papa San, Michelle Williams	Journey	

== Videography ==
=== Music videos ===
Title	Year	Director(s)	Ref.
As a lead artist
"Heard a Word"	2002	Sylvain White	
"Do You Know"	2004	Matthew Rolston	
"We Break the Dawn"	2008	Phil Griffin	
"We Break the Dawn, Part 2" (featuring Flo Rida)	2008	Phil Griffin	
"We Break the Dawn" (Karmatronic Remix Radio Edit)	2008	Phil Griffin	
"The Greatest"	2008	Thomas Kloss	
"Waiting on You" (with Ultra Naté)	2012	Karl Giant	
"If We Had Your Eyes"	2013	Derek Blanks	
"Fire"	2014	Derek Blanks	
"Say Yes" (featuring Beyoncé and Kelly Rowland)	2014	Matthew A. Cherry	
"Believe in Me"	2015	Matthew A. Cherry	
As a featured artist
"Boogie Oogie Oogie" (Brooke Valentine)	2005	Kevin Hunter	
"Get Me Bodied" (Beyoncé)	2007	Anthony Mandler and Beyoncé	
"On the Run" (Electric Giant Beatz featuring Michelle Williams)	2011	Eduard Schneider	
"Superpower" (Beyoncé featuring Frank Ocean)	2013	Jonas Akerlund	
"Rather Be" (Tyler Ward, Fresh Big Mouf featuring Michelle Williams and Deitrick Haddon)	2014	—N/a	

== See also ==
- List of artists who reached number one on the U.S. Dance Club Songs chart
- Destiny's Child discography
