= List of awards and nominations received by Michelle Williams =

List of awards and nominations received by Michelle Williams may refer to:

- List of awards and nominations received by Michelle Williams (actress)
- List of awards and nominations received by Michelle Williams (singer)
