= Naked (Marques Houston song) =

Single by Marques Houston

from the album Naked
- Released: July 20, 2005
- Length: 4:26
- Label: TUG
- Songwriters: Durrell Babbs; Antonio Dixon; Steven L. Russell; Harvey Mason, Jr.; Damon Thomas
- Producer: The Underdogs

Marques Houston singles chronology
| "All Because of You" (2005) | "Naked" (2005) | "Sex wit You" (2005) |

"Naked" is a song by American singer Marques Houston. It was written by Harvey Mason, Jr., Damon Thomas, Durrell Babbs, Steven Russell and Antonio Dixon for his second studio album of the same name (2005), while production was helmed by The Underdogs. The song peaked at #47 on the US Billboard Hot 100. The remix for "Naked" features Mike Jones.

== Music video ==
The music video for "Naked" was edited to be aired on BET and other networks. The video shows Marques with his female partner in bed and also in the bathtub nude. There are also some scenes with Marques standing and singing (with his crotch just below the camera).

== Charts ==
=== Weekly charts ===
Weekly chart performance for "Naked"
| Chart (2005) | Peak position |
|---|---|
| US Billboard Hot 100 | 47 |
| US Hot R&B/Hip-Hop Songs (Billboard) | 8 |
| US Rhythmic Airplay (Billboard) | 36 |

=== Year-end charts ===
Year-end chart performance for "Naked"
| Chart (2005) | Position |
|---|---|
| US Hot R&B/Hip-Hop Songs (Billboard) | 46 |

== Release history ==
Release dates and formats for "Stay Fly"
| Region | Date | Format | Label(s) | Ref. |
|---|---|---|---|---|
| United States | July 26, 2005 | Rhythmic airplay | Universal | |
| United States | October 25, 2005 | Mainstream airplay | Universal | |
