= List of awards and nominations received by Michelle Williams (singer) =

Michelle Williams awards and nominations
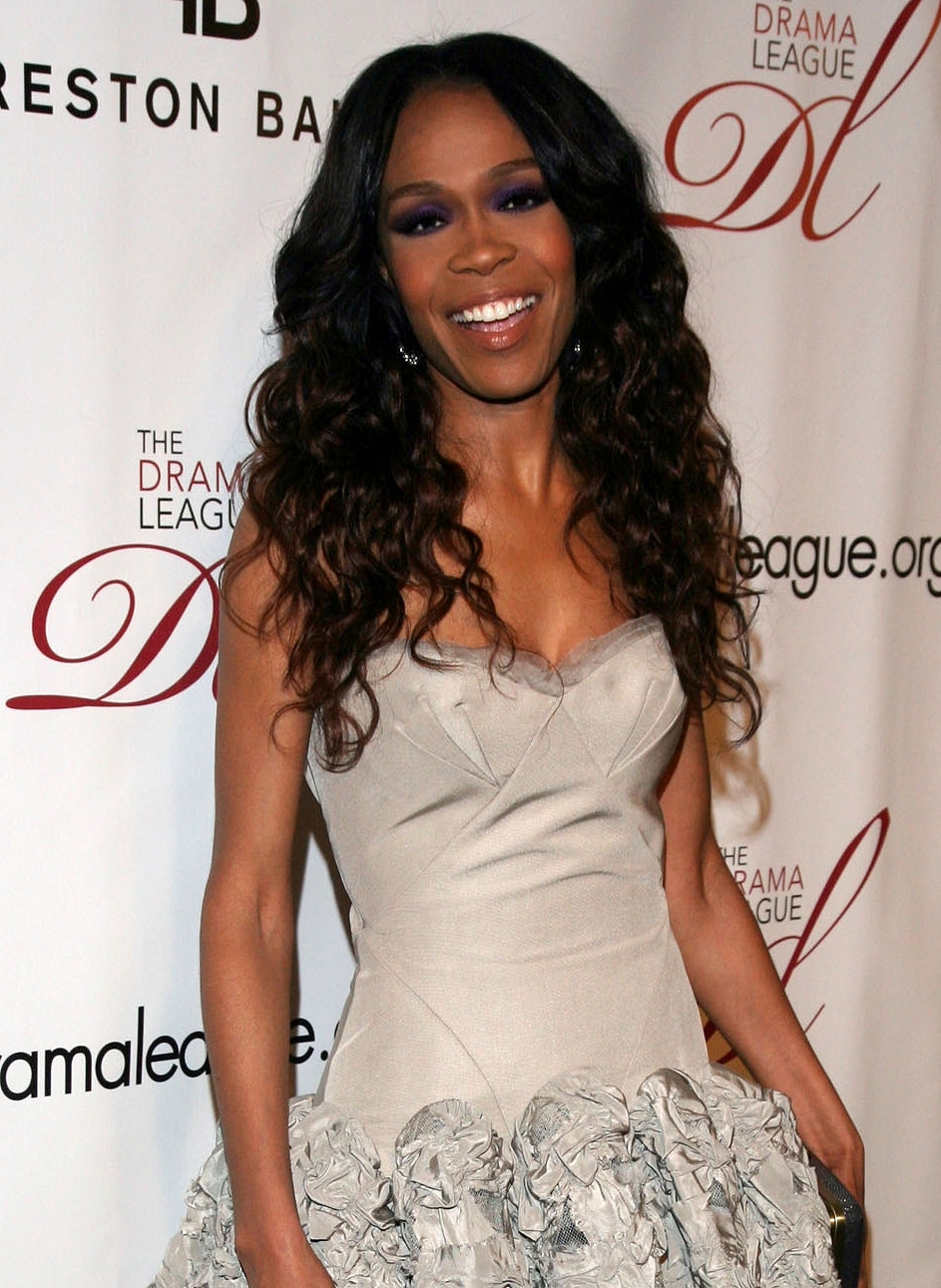
- Williams at the 2012 Drama League Benefit Gala.
Awards and nominations
| Award | Wins | Nominations |
| BET | 0 | 1 |
| Grammy | 1 | 7 |
| MOBO | 1 | 2 |
| NAACP Theatre Awards | 0 | 1 |
| ASCAP Pop Music Awards | 2 | 2 |
| ASCAP Rhythm & Soul Music Awards | 3 | 3 |
| GMA Dove Awards | 0 | 1 |
| GMWA Excellence Awards | 0 | 1 |
| Gospel Touch Music Awards | 1 | 1 |
| NAACP Image Awards | 0 | 1 |
| NewNowNext Awards | 0 | 1 |
| Stellar Awards | 1 | 5 |

Totals (Note: Certain award groups do not simply award one winner. They acknowledge several different recipients, have runners-up, and have third place. Since this is a specific recognition and is different from losing an award, runner-up mentions are considered wins in this award tally. For simplification and to avoid errors, each award in this list has been presumed to have had a prior nomination.)
- Wins: 9
- Nominations: 26

This is a list of awards and nominations received by Michelle Williams.

== Acting ==
=== NAACP Theatre Awards ===
| Year | Nominated work | Award | Result |
|---|---|---|---|
| 2007 | Michelle Williams for The Color Purple | Best Lead Female – Equity | Nominated |

== Music ==
=== ASCAP Awards ===
==== ASCAP Pop Music Awards ====
The American Society of Composers, Authors and Publishers (ASCAP) is a not-for-profit performance rights organization that protects its members' musical copyrights by monitoring public performances of their music, whether via a broadcast or live performance, and compensating them accordingly. Williams has received 4 awards from the company as a member of Destiny's Child.

| Year | Nominated work | Award | Result |
|---|---|---|---|
| 2006 | "Lose My Breath" | Most Performed Song | Won |
| 2006 | "Soldier" (featuring T.I. and Lil Wayne) | Most Performed Song | Won |

==== ASCAP Rhythm & Soul Music Awards ====
| Year | Nominated work | Award | Result |
|---|---|---|---|
| 2006 | "Cater 2 U" | Award Winning R&B/Hip-Hop Songs | Won |
| 2006 | "Soldier" (featuring T.I. and Lil Wayne) | Award Winning R&B/Hip-Hop Songs | Won |

=== BET Awards ===
| Year | Nominated work | Award | Result |
|---|---|---|---|
| 2015 | Michelle Williams | Best Gospel Artist | Nominated |

=== GMA Dove Awards ===
| Year | Nominated work | Award | Result |
|---|---|---|---|
| 2003 | Michelle Williams | Female Vocalist of the Year Urban Contemporary | Nominated |

=== GMWA Excellence Awards ===
| Year | Nominated work | Award | Result |
|---|---|---|---|
| 2003 | Michelle Williams | New Artist of the Year | Nominated |

=== Gospel Touch Music Awards ===
The Gospel Touch Music Awards are held annually in the United Kingdom to recognize gospel and inspirational music. Williams has one award.

| Year | Nominated work | Award | Result |
|---|---|---|---|
| 2014 | "Say Yes"(featuring Beyoncé & Kelly Rowland) | Song of the Year | Won |

=== Grammy Awards ===
The Grammy Awards are awarded annually by the National Academy of Recording Arts and Sciences. Williams has won 1 award from 8 nominations.

| Year | Nominated work | Award | Result |
|---|---|---|---|
| 2002 | Survivor | Best R&B Album | Nominated |
| 2002 | "Survivor" | Best R&B Performance by a Duo or Group with Vocals | Won |
| 2005 | "Lose My Breath" | Best R&B Performance by a Duo or Group with Vocals | Nominated |
| 2006 | Destiny Fulfilled | Best Contemporary R&B Album | Nominated |
| 2006 | "Cater 2 U" | Best R&B Song | Nominated |
| 2006 | "Cater 2 U" | Best R&B Performance by a Duo or Group with Vocals | Nominated |
| 2006 | "Soldier" (featuring T.I. and Lil Wayne) | Best Rap/Sung Collaboration | Nominated |
| 2026 | Death Becomes Her | Best Musical Theater Album | Nominated |

=== NAACP Image Awards ===
The NAACP Image Awards is an award presented annually by the American National Association for the Advancement of Colored People to honor outstanding people of color in film, television, music and literature. Williams has received two nominations as a solo act.

| Year | Nominated work | Award | Result |
|---|---|---|---|
| 2014 | Journey to Freedom (album) | Outstanding Gospel Album (Traditional or Contemporary) | Nominated |
| 2022 | “Checking In with Michelle Williams” | Outstanding Lifestyle/Self-Help Podcast | Nominated |

=== NewNowNext Awards ===
| Year | Nominated work | Award | Result |
|---|---|---|---|
| 2008 | "We Break the Dawn" | Best R&B Vocal Performance By a Female Artist | Nominated |

=== MOBO Awards ===
The MOBO Awards (an acronym for Music of Black Origin) are held annually in the United Kingdom to recognize artists of any race or nationality performing music of black origin. Williams has won one award from two nominations.

| Year | Nominated work | Award | Result |
|---|---|---|---|
| 2002 | Michelle Williams | Best Gospel Act | Won |
| 2004 | Michelle Williams | Best Gospel Act | Nominated |

=== Soul Train Awards ===
The Soul Train Music Awards is an annual awards ceremony that was established in 1987 to honor the best in African American music and entertainment. Williams has received one honorary award and three competitive awards from nine nominations.

| Year | Nominated work | Award | Result |
|---|---|---|---|
| 2001 | Destiny's Child | Entertainer of the Year | Won |
| 2001 | "Independent Women Part I" | Best R&B/Soul Single by a Group, Band or Duo | Nominated |
| 2002 | "Survivor" | Best R&B/Soul Single by a Group, Band or Duo | Nominated |
| 2002 | Survivor | Best R&B/Soul Album – Group, Band or Duo | Nominated |
| 2005 | Destiny Fulfilled | Best R&B/Soul Album – Group, Band or Duo | Won |
| 2005 | "Lose My Breath" | Best R&B/Soul Single – Group, Band or Duo | Nominated |
| 2006 | "Cater 2 U" | Best R&B/Soul Single – Group, Band or Duo | Won |
| 2006 | Destiny's Child | Quincy Jones Award for Outstanding Career Achievements – Female | Honored |
| 2014 | "Say Yes"(featuring Beyoncé & Kelly Rowland) | Best Gospel/Inspirational Song | Nominated |

=== Stellar Awards ===
The Stellar Awards is an annual awards show in the US, honoring Gospel Music Artists, writers, and industry professionals for their contributions to the gospel music industry. The Stellar Awards ranks high in status as the only gospel music television awards program syndicated in over 140 markets nationwide. Williams has been nominated five times and won one award.

| Year | Nominated work | Award | Result |
|---|---|---|---|
| 2003 | Michelle Williams | New Artist of the Year | Nominated |
| 2015 | "Say Yes" (featuring Beyoncé & Kelly Rowland) | Song of the Year | Nominated |
| 2015 | "Say Yes" (featuring Beyoncé & Kelly Rowland) | Urban/Inspirational/Instrumental Single/Performance of the Year | Nominated |
| 2015 | "Say Yes" (featuring Beyoncé & Kelly Rowland) | Music Video of the Year | Won |
| 2015 | Michelle Williams | Female Vocalist of the Year | Nominated |
