= Hello Heartbreak =

Single by Michelle Williams

from the album Unexpected
- Released: September 9, 2008
- Studio: The Record Plant (Los Angeles)
- Genre: Electro-R&B
- Length: 4:10
- Label: Music World; Columbia
- Songwriters: Rico Love; James Scheffer
- Producer: Jim Jonsin

Michelle Williams singles chronology
"The Greatest" (2008)	"Hello Heartbreak" (2008)	"On the Run" (2011)

"Hello Heartbreak" is a song recorded by American singer-songwriter Michelle Williams. It was co-written by Jim Jonsin and Rico Love, and produced by Jonsin for Williams' third studio album Unexpected (2008).

== Critical reception ==
"Hello Heartbreak" received universally positive reception from critics. Mikael Wood of the Billboard described the song as a "shiny electro-R&B gem", while Josette Compton of Entertainment Weekly noted the "technodriven" track is "reminiscent of Kylie Minogue". Pete Lewis of Blues & Soul also compared the song to other works, commenting that the "synth-heavy uptempo cut" "heavily" relies "on the kind of Euro-dance-inspired electronica utilised recently by fellow US urbanites like Timbaland and Justin Timberlake".

== Release ==
Single was released in United States on December 2, 2008, for digital download and airplay through Columbia and Music World. In June 2009, Michelle confirmed via Twitter that her album Unexpected would receive a full UK re-release and that "Hello Heartbreak" would be the first single set for release in July 2009. In August 2009, Music Week reported "Hello Heartbreak" was due for a UK release on August 31, as a single and as Williams' fourth studio album.

== Track listings ==
Digital download – Remixes EP
No.	Title	Producer(s)	Length
1.	"Hello Heartbreak" (Album Version)	Jim Jonsin	4:10
2.	"Hello Heartbreak" (Kovas Ghetto Beat Remix)	Jonsin; Kovas^{[a]}	4:23
3.	"Hello Heartbreak" (Catalyst Remix)	Jonsin; Cataylist^{[a]}	4:01
4.	"Hello Heartbreak" (Lost Daze Deep Inside Mix)	Jonsin; Lost Daze^{[a]}	7:05
5.	"Hello Heartbreak" (Matty's Body and Soul Mix)	Jonsin; Matty^{[a]}	8:38

Notes

- ^{^[a]} signifies additional producer

== Credits and personnel ==
Credits adapted from the liner notes of Unexpected.

- Fritz – mixing engineer
- Joe Gonzales – engineer
- Jim Jonsin – producer, writer
- Rico Love – vocal producer, writer
- Dan Nain – recording engineer
- Michelle Williams – vocals

== Charts ==
Chart (2008–2009)	Peak position
UK Commercial Pop Top 30 (Music Week)	6
UK Upfront Club Top 40 (Music Week)	15
UK Urban Top 30 (Music Week)	29
US Hot Singles Sales (Billboard)	40
US Dance/Electronic Singles Sales (Billboard)	8

== Release history ==
List of release dates, showing region, release format, and reference
Region	Date	Format(s)	Label	Ref.
Various	September 9, 2008	Digital download	Music World; Columbia	
United Kingdom	August 31, 2009 (re-release)		RCA	
