= Michelle Williams (singer) =

American singer and actress (born 1979)

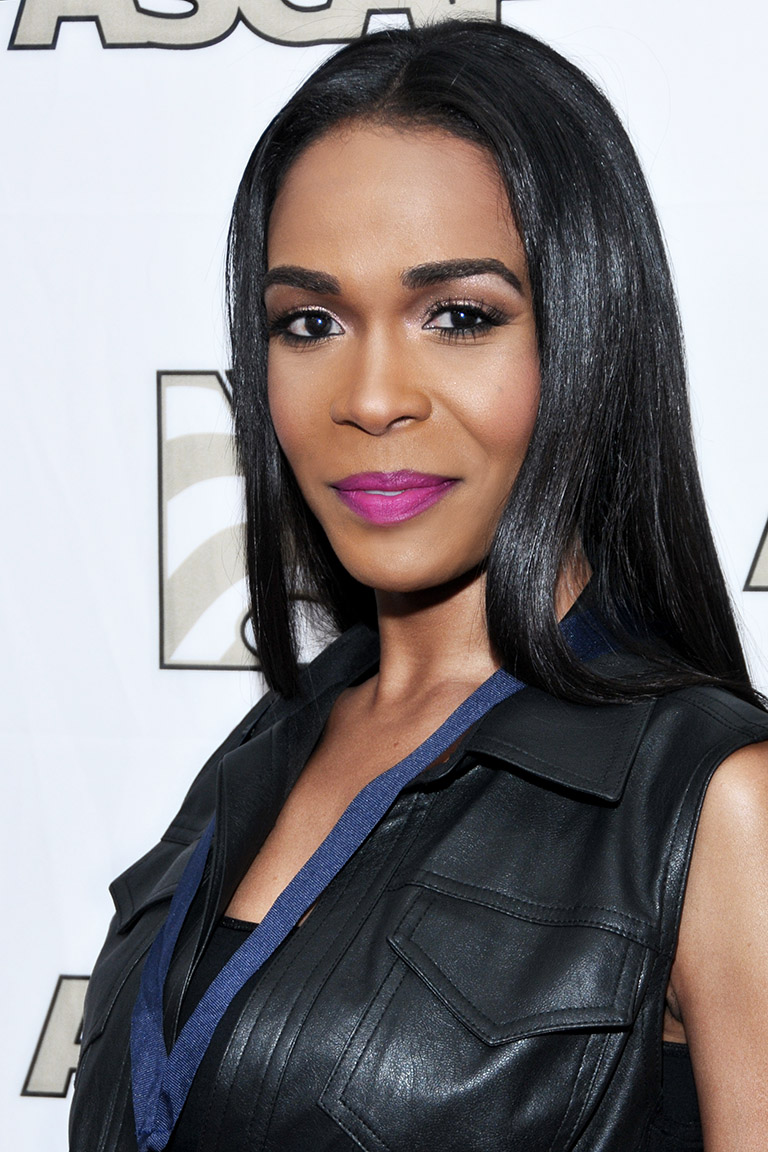
- Williams in 2015
- Born: Tenitra Michelle Williams; July 23, 1979 (age 47); Rockford, Illinois, U.S.
- Occupations: Singer; actress; podcaster
- Years active: 1999–present
- Notable work: Solo discography; Works with Destiny's Child
- Awards: Full list
- Musical career
- Genres: R&B; soul; pop; gospel
- Instrument: Vocals
- Labels: Columbia; Music World Entertainment; E1; Light
- Formerly of: Destiny's Child

Tenitra Michelle Williams (born July 23, 1979) is an American singer and actress. She rose to fame in the early 2000s as a member of R&B girl group Destiny's Child, one of the best-selling female groups of all time with over 60 million records, of which more than 40 million copies sold with the trio lineup that included Williams. During her time in the group she earned several accolades including a Grammy Award and a star on the Hollywood Walk of Fame.

During the group's two-year hiatus, 2001–2003, Williams released her debut solo album Heart to Yours (2002) which topped the US gospel album chart. That same year, Billboard named Williams the fifth top-charting gospel artist of the year and she received a MOBO Award for "Best Gospel Act". Following this, she released her second solo album Do You Know (2004). After Destiny's Child's disbandment in 2006, Williams released her first pop album, Unexpected (2008), which spawned the singles "We Break the Dawn" and the US Dance number-one "The Greatest". Her fourth studio album, Journey to Freedom (2014), received positive reviews and became her highest-charting album in the US; it includes the singles "If We Had Your Eyes", and "Say Yes" which topped the US Hot Gospel Songs chart for seven weeks, and won the Stellar Award for Music Video of the Year.

Williams has also ventured into acting, appearing in television, Broadway, and West End theatre productions. Making her acting debut on Broadway in Aida (2003), she has since starred in the sitcom series Half & Half (2006) and the musical productions The Color Purple (2007), Chicago (2009–10), What My Husband Doesn't Know (2011) Fela! (2013) and the original Broadway production of Death Becomes Her (2024). In addition, she received a nomination for "Best Lead Female – Equity" in 2008 at the 18th Annual NAACP Theatre Awards. Williams was a featured judge on MTV's Top Pop Group, a contestant on season 8 of Strictly Come Dancing in the United Kingdom, and has also appeared on the American, British, and Australian versions of The Masked Singer.

== Early life ==
Tenitra Michelle Williams was born in Rockford, Illinois, on July 23, 1979, to Anita Williams (née Washington) and Dennis Williams III (1952–2020). She has three siblings: elder brother Erron, who is a musician, elder sister Cameron, and younger sister Danielle. Williams made her musical debut at the age of seven, performing a rendition of the hymn "Blessed Assurance" at the St. Paul Church of God in Christ. She later sang in the gospel groups United Harmony and Chosen Expression.

Williams graduated from Rockford Auburn High School in 1997. Shortly after graduating, she pursued a degree in criminal justice at Illinois State University, doubtful of her ability to make a career as a professional singer. After two years of college, she left to pursue a music career, as a backing vocalist for other artists such as Monica.

== Career ==
=== 1999–2003: Breakthrough with Destiny's Child, Heart to Yours and Aida ===
In late 1999, 20-year-old Williams met Destiny's Child band members Beyoncé Knowles and Kelly Rowland in the lobby of an Atlanta hotel. Several months later, a choreographer acquaintance of Williams who knew the group, connected Williams to the Knowles family and Rowland, as they were vetting potential new group members. After the much-publicized turmoil, Williams, alongside Farrah Franklin, officially joined the group in early 2000, replacing LeToya Luckett and LaTavia Roberson without notice. Buoyed by the group's breakout success, Luckett and Roberson had both attempted to split with the group's manager Mathew Knowles in late 1999, claiming that he kept a disproportionate share of the band's profits and unfairly favored Knowles and Rowland.

The issue was heightened after Williams and Franklin appeared in the video of "Say My Name", implying that the original band members were already replaced. Franklin, however, faded from the group after five months, as evidenced by her absences during promotional appearances and concerts. Franklin attributed her departure to negative vibes in the group resulting from the strife. After settling on this final lineup, the trio released "Independent Women Part I", which appeared on the soundtrack to the 2000 film Charlie's Angels. It became their best-charting single yet, topping the official US singles chart for eleven consecutive weeks. The success cemented the new lineup and skyrocketed them to fame.

In May 2001, Destiny's Child released the group's third studio album Survivor. It debuted at number one on the US Billboard 200 with sales of 663,000 copies. Survivor has sold over twelve million copies worldwide, 4.1 million of which were sold in the US alone. The album's other number-one hits are "Bootylicious" and the title track "Survivor", the latter earning the group a Grammy Award for Best R&B Performance by a Duo or Group with Vocals at the 44th Annual Grammy Awards. In October 2001, Destiny's Child released their holiday album, 8 Days of Christmas. Before releasing the 2002 compilation album, This Is the Remix, the group announced their temporary break-up to pursue solo projects.

While Williams was still with Destiny's Child, she intensified work on her debut solo album Heart to Yours. The album material included collaborations with singers Carl Thomas, Shirley Caesar and the Mary Mary duo, taking the singer's work further into urban contemporary gospel and Christian music. "Some people will do gospel when their career fails, but I chose to do it at the height of the popularity of Destiny's Child", Williams explained during the album's release. "And I didn't want to do it because it was a fad. I wanted to do it because it's in me. It's in my heart." Released on April 16, 2002, in North America to much critical acclaim, Williams became the first member of Destiny's Child to release solo material with Heart to Yours. The album sold 20,000 copies in its first week, placing it at number 57 on the Billboard 200 and number two on the Billboard Gospel Albums chart, where it later rose to number one.

Heart to Yours became one of the year's best-selling gospel album, selling more than 220,000 units in the US, as of 2008. A music video for the album's single, "Heard a Word", was produced by film director Sylvain White. Heart to Yours won Williams a MOBO Award for Best Gospel Act along with a raft of nominations including a Stellar Award nomination for New Artist of the Year, a GMWA Excellence Award nomination for Female Vocalist of the Year Urban Contemporary and a GMA Dove Award nomination for Traditional Gospel Recorded Song of the Year at the 33rd GMA Dove Awards for her collaboration with Shirley Caesar on "Steal Away To Jesus" which was first featured on Caesar's Hymns album. Billboard listed Williams as the fifth Top Gospel Artist of 2002.

In August 2002, Williams embarked on her first tour as a solo artist in promotion of her debut album. Sponsored by Burger King, the 19-date BK Got Music Summer Soul Tour also featured Luther Vandross, Angie Stone and Gerald Levert. Following the release and promotion of Heart to Yours, Williams made her on-stage acting debut in 2003, replacing fellow singer Toni Braxton in the title role of Aida, the hit Broadway musical with music by Elton John and lyrics by Tim Rice. She was the first and remains the only Destiny's Child member to have acted on Broadway.

=== 2004–2007: Destiny's Child's final projects, Do You Know and acting debut ===
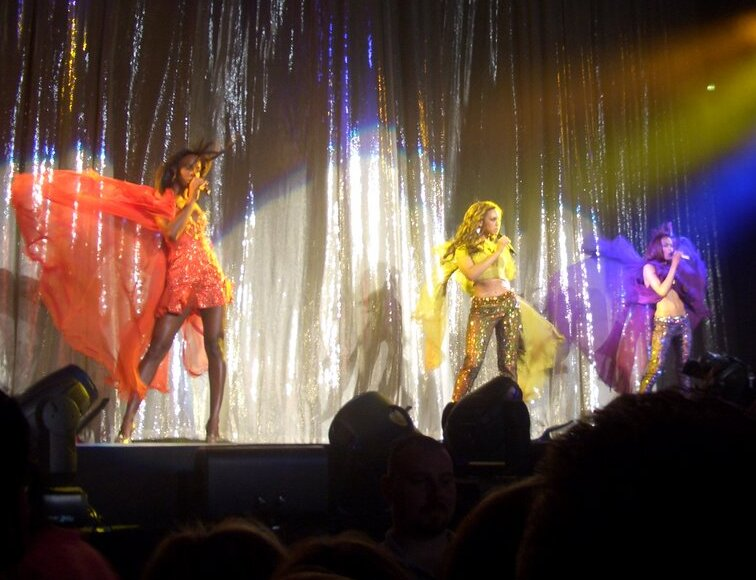
Destiny's Child performing during the farewell concert tour, Destiny Fulfilled ... And Lovin' It, 2005

During the release of her fellow Destiny's Child members' debut albums, Rowland's Simply Deep and Knowles' Dangerously in Love, Williams spent time in the studio, recording her second album. The album saw her generally re-teaming with the majority of the producers and songwriters from her previous effort, including Solange Knowles, Dawkins & Dawkins and brother Erron Williams. Released in January 2004 in the United States, Do You Know reached number 120 on the Billboard 200 chart, despite a warm reception from critics who lent praise to Williams' songwriting ability. Once again, Williams scored more success on the component charts, where the album debuted at number two on the Top Gospel Albums chart and number three on the top Christian Albums tally. The album was later re-released, including previously unreleased songs and has sold 78,000 copies in the US, as of March 2008.

After a three-year hiatus, Destiny's Child reunited for Destiny Fulfilled, released in November 2004. The album hit number two on the Billboard 200, and spawned the singles "Lose My Breath", "Soldier" (featuring T.I. & Lil Wayne), "Girl" and "Cater 2 U". In support of the album, Destiny's Child embarked on a 2005 Destiny Fulfilled... And Lovin' It world tour, which started in April to September of the same year. On the Barcelona, Spain visit, the group announced their disbandment after their final North American leg would end. In October 2005, the group released a greatest hits album, titled #1's, including their most successful singles alongside three new tracks, including the band's final single "Stand Up for Love", penned by David Foster. Destiny's Child was honored with a star on the Hollywood Walk of Fame in March 2006. They were recognized as the world's best-selling female group of all time.

Following Destiny's Child's disbandment in early 2006, Williams made her television debut in the UPN comedy Half & Half, where she played the role of Naomi, a record company executive who is HIV positive. Later that year, she appeared as one of the celebrity singers on the FOX reality television show Celebrity Duets, duetting with actors Alfonso Ribeiro and Jai Rodriguez. In April 2006, Williams performed "America the Beautiful" at World Wrestling Entertainment's event WrestleMania 22. Beginning in April 2007, Williams joined Oprah Winfrey's Chicago-based cast of the hit Broadway musical The Color Purple for its national tour, starting with an extended run at the Cadillac Palace Theatre. Williams described the opportunity as "a dream come true", playing the part of blues singer Shug Avery, which earned her positive reception.

=== 2008–2010: Unexpected, Chicago and label troubles ===
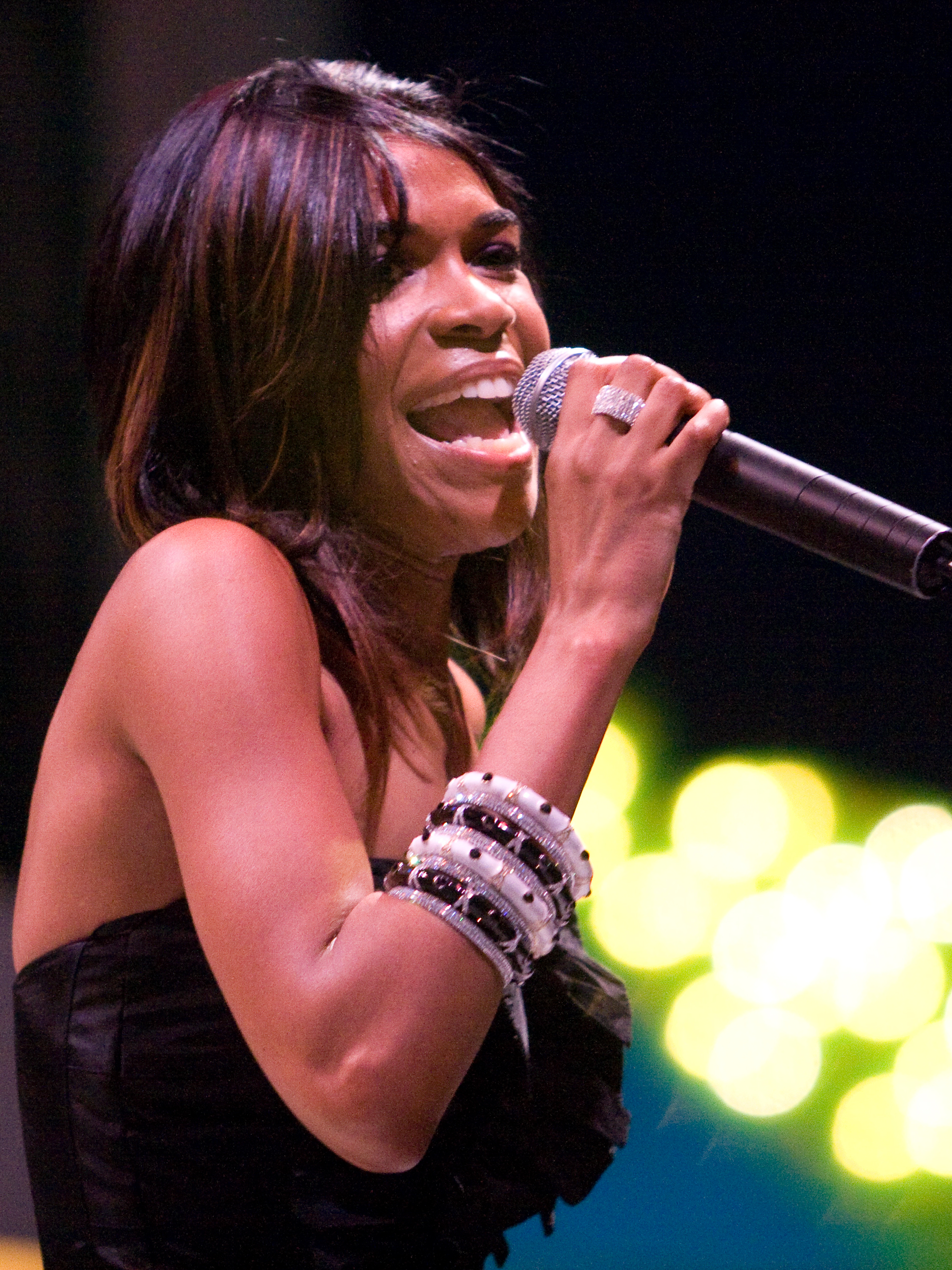
Michelle at the Rye Playland, 2008

In March 2008, Williams announced the release of her third studio album Unexpected in October 2008. A breakaway from the gospel music on her first two solo albums to secular pop/R&B, the album, her first release since the disbanding of Destiny's Child, involves production by Stargate, Rico Love, Wayne Wilkins and Soulshock and Karlin, among others. In June 2008, Williams released lead single "We Break the Dawn" to universal acclaim from critics who hailed it as "a terrific fusion of European disco and American R&B". The song became her most successful single yet, peaking at number four on the US Hot Dance Club Play chart, topping the US Hot Dance Airplay chart and reaching the top 50 on the UK singles chart and top 40 in Hungary — where it also placed on the 2009 year-end chart.

In September 2008, "The Greatest" was issued as the second single release to mainstream radio, while "Hello Heartbreak" was catered to dance clubs. "The Greatest" became Williams' second hit on the Billboard dance charts when it peaked at number-one the US Hot Dance Club Songs. Gaining favorable reviews from critics, in October 2008 Unexpected debuted on the US Billboard 200 albums chart at number 42 and number 11 on the US Billboard Top R&B/Hip-Hop Albums chart, with first week sales of 14,618 units. The album charted internationally, in the UK and Japan.

In July 2009, Williams began a limited six-week engagement at the Cambridge Theatre in Chicago, making her the first African-American to be cast in the West End production of the musical. Her run was extended and Williams continued appearing for three additional weeks for an extended engagement starting August 23 through September 12. In January 2010, Williams parted ways with her manager Mathew Knowles and Music World Entertainment. In February 2010, Williams made a return to Broadway by commencing a seven-week limited engagement in Chicago at the Ambassador Theatre, replacing Ashlee Simpson. In April, it was announced that Williams would extend her limited engagement in Chicago.

In August 2010, it was reported that Williams would be participating on season 8 of the British television dance competition show Strictly Come Dancing, the originator of the global Dancing with the Stars franchise. On the launch show, it was revealed that Williams had been paired with Brendan Cole. They remained in the competition for seven weeks with variable results; on October 23, Ian Waite stood in as her professional partner when Cole was unable to do so. Williams was eliminated on November 14. In December 2010, Williams joined DJ Martin Jay to become a co-host on Choice FM's Breakfast Show in London for the month, replacing Lucy Ambache who was on maternity leave. On December 15, Williams released the song "Stay for a Minute", a leftover from Unexpected for free digital download via Twitter to celebrate gaining over 100,000 followers.

=== 2011–2014: Acting, label change and Journey to Freedom ===
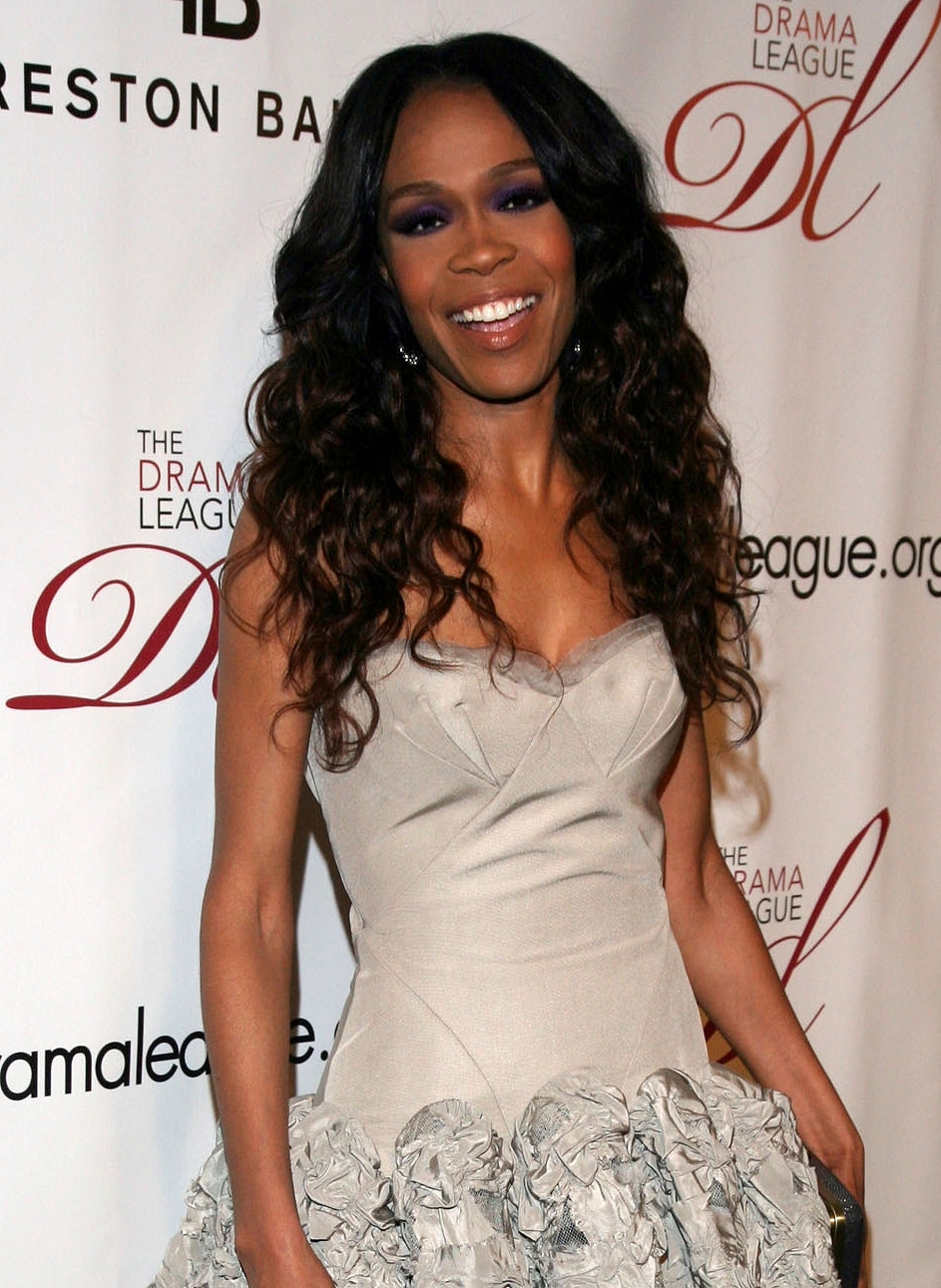
Williams at the 2012 Drama League Benefit Gala in February 2012

In January 2011, Williams appeared on BBC's popular comedy panel game show Never Mind the Buzzcocks. In February 2011, Williams began a 28-city tour starring in the David E. Talbert stage-play What My Husband Doesn't Know along with Brian J. White, Ann Nesby and Clifton Davis, playing the lead role of Lena Summer. In July 2011, Williams released a buzz single titled "Love Gun", to precede the release of her upcoming fourth solo album, on which she had begun work in 2010. In August, Electronic Giant Beatz released a press release, cover art and a music video teaser for a song featuring Williams titled "On the Run". The song was released in the United Kingdom in November 2011. In December, Ultra Naté released a joint collaboration with Williams titled "Waiting on You" which rose to number eleven on the Billboard Hot Dance Club Songs chart.

On June 7, 2012, it was announced that Williams had been signed to Light Records and was due to release her fourth studio album in 2013. On January 3, 2013, it was announced that Williams would play Sandra Izsadore in the national tour of the Tony Award nominated musical Fela!, beginning January 29 in Washington, D.C., and playing in a total of 16 cities. Destiny's Child released a compilation album titled Love Songs on January 29, which featured the newly recorded song "Nuclear", co-written by Williams.

On February 3, 2013, during Knowles' performance at the Super Bowl XLVII halftime show, held at the Mercedes-Benz Superdome in New Orleans, Rowland and Williams joined Knowles on the stage, where the trio performed excerpts from "Bootylicious", "Independent Women Part I", and "Single Ladies (Put a Ring on It)". Rowland and Williams then exited the stage and Knowles ended her performance. On February 21, it was announced that Williams would be starring in her own reality television show, titled My Sister's Keeper produced by E1 Television, to coincide with the release of her fourth studio album.

In December 2013, Knowles released her self-titled fifth studio album in which Williams appeared alongside Knowles and Kelly Rowland on the song and music video "Superpower" (featuring Frank Ocean). In 2014, Williams became the spokesperson for a Playtex campaign titled Play On Playbook. In April, it was announced that Williams would join the 50-city North American arena tour of Andrew Lloyd Webber's rock opera Jesus Christ Superstar as Mary Magdalene alongside Superstar winner Ben Forster and other recording artists such as Brandon Boyd and JC Chasez. In May 2014, the tour was cancelled before its launch in New Orleans due to poor ticket sales. It was announced that Williams would star as a mentor in an Oxygen reality television competition titled Fix My Choir, alongside fellow contemporary gospel recording artists Deitrick Haddon and Tye Tribbett.

In June 2013, Williams released the lead single from her inspirational fourth album Journey to Freedom, titled "If We Had Your Eyes" (featuring Fantasia). The single became her first release to appear on the US Billboard Adult R&B Songs and Hot Gospel Songs charts, peaking at nineteen and twenty-two respectively. Williams reunited with her former Destiny's Child bandmates for the single "Say Yes", which was released a year later and became Williams' first number-one on the US Hot Gospel Songs; additionally charting internationally in the UK, France and Belgium. "Say Yes" spent seven weeks at number one on the Hot Gospel Songs chart and received a nomination for the Soul Train Music Award for Best Gospel/Inspirational Song at the 2014 Soul Train Music Awards.

In September 2014, Journey to Freedom debuted at number twenty-nine on the US Billboard 200, reaching number seven on the Independent Albums chart. It became a top 10 success on the UK Christian & Gospel Albums chart where it debuted at number 6. Journey to Freedom was nominated for Outstanding Gospel Album (Traditional or Contemporary) at the 46th NAACP Image Awards, while "Say Yes" won Music Video of the Year at the 30th Stellar Awards, where Williams received a total of four nominations and reunited with Knowles and Rowland for a live performance of the song.

=== 2015–2019: Continued acting, Coachella, and The Masked Singer ===
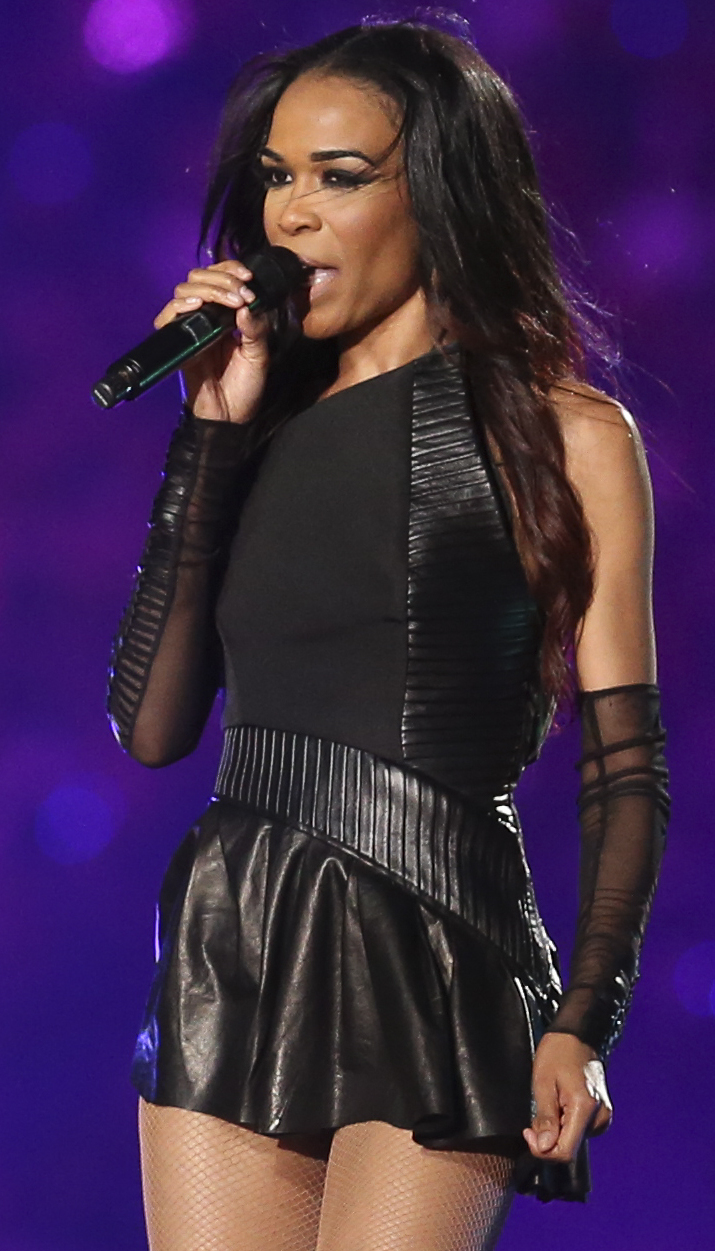
Williams at Super Bowl XLVII halftime show

On April 14, 2015, Williams sang for president Barack Obama at the White House. The program titled, The Gospel Tradition: In Performance at the White House was broadcast on June 26, 2015, on PBS stations and simulcast on TV One. In August 2015, Williams reprised the title role in Aida, presented at the St. Louis venue. The following month, she premiered her Believe at Home bedding collection on the EVINE network. In 2016, Williams sang again for Obama at the White House; alongside Yolanda Adams and Kierra Sheard in the program titled BET Presents: Love and Happiness: An Obama Celebration.

In April 2018, Williams reunited with Knowles and Rowland during Knowles headlining set at the Coachella Valley Music and Arts Festival. In late 2018, Williams starred alongside her then-fiancé, Chad Johnson in the OWN reality show Chad Loves Michelle. Williams also returned to Broadway as Erzulie in the Tony Award winning revival of Once on This Island on November 30, 2018, leaving in December on doctor's orders. On December 7, Williams released the pop single "Fearless" on Radiance Music Group.

On December 21, it was announced by Deadline Hollywood that Williams would guest star as Diana Ross in an episode of the BET period drama series American Soul, which aired in February 2019. In April 2019, the singer was involved in Knowles' documentary Homecoming and homonymous album. Later that year, Williams competed as Butterfly in the second season of The Masked Singer. In December 2019, she came back to the stage starring as the Evil Queen for the 10th anniversary of A Snow White Christmas at the Pasadena Civic Auditorium, alongside Neil Patrick Harris and Jared Gertner.

=== 2020–present: Checking In Memoir, The Masked Singer, and Broadway return ===
In November 2020, Williams announced her memoir, Checking In: How Getting Real About Depression Saved My Life–and Can Save Yours, which was released in May 2021. The accompanying podcast, Checking In with Michelle Williams, premiered on streaming services in December 2020, and was nominated at the 53rd NAACP Image Awards for Outstanding Lifestyle/Self-Help Podcast. On October 29, 2021, Williams costarred in Hallmark's holiday themed TV movie, Christmas in Harmony. In 2022, Williams competed as Rockhopper in the third series of the British version of The Masked Singer. She later competed as Microphone in the fourth season of The Masked Singer Australia, making her the first celebrity to compete in three versions of the show. She also starred in the Lifetime movie Wrath: A Seven Deadly Sins Story, which aired on April 16, 2022.

In January 2024, Williams appeared alongside her cousin Evandia Penix on Fox's We Are Family. In March 2024, Williams was cast in the musical adaptation of Death Becomes Her, playing Viola Van Horn, who was named Lisle von Rhuman (Isabella Rossellini) in the film version, at the Cadillac Palace Theatre in Chicago from April 30 to June 2. She continued the role in the Broadway production which started on October 23. In June 2025, she headlined the first edition of the gospel music festival Gospel Fest Miami at Adrienne Arscht Center.

== Artistry ==
=== Voice ===
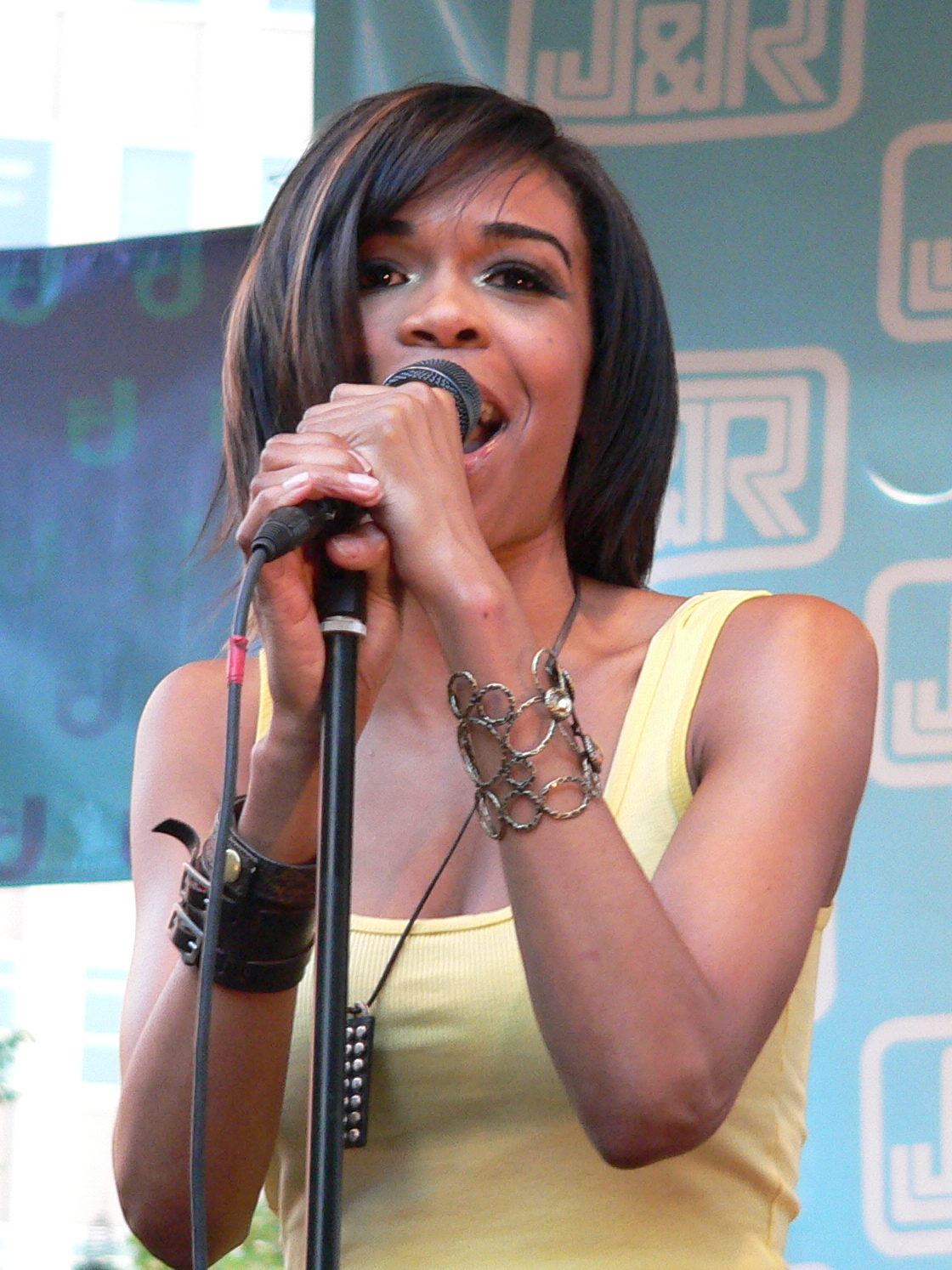
Michelle Williams on stage at the J&R's Musicfest, 2008

Williams can be identified as a soprano. William Ruhlmann of AllMusic commented that she has a "warm, kittenish voice" with the ability to "transform" from "kitten to tiger", belting "with absolute conviction". GospelMusicCity.com praised her "delicate vocals" and described her "sopralto stylings" as "inimitable", writing that on "Heard a Word" she "demonstrates further versatility in Ella-like fashion".

Sal Cinquemani of Slant Magazine compared her to other singers, writing "Williams's warm vocal recalls both the playful wisps of her R&B contemporaries (Jill Scott, Erykah Badu) and the breathy timbre of Diana Ross". Emily Sogn of PopMatters wrote "Williams singing style is pleasingly slow paced...that owes a lot to her pop contemporaries like Ashanti and Janet Jackson." Mike Rimmer of Cross Rhythms described her voice as "soulful". Caroline Sullivan of The Guardian wrote that "Williams's strength is a shimmery jazz lilt".

In retrospective assessments of Destiny's Child's work, critics and fans have praised Williams for her performances on the group's bridges, with Elise Brisco of Rolling Stone describing her as "queen of the music bridge".

== Honors and awards ==
Williams has earned an array of awards and honors as a solo artist and a member of Destiny's Child. These include: one Grammy Award and one MOBO Award. Billboard ranked Williams as the fifth Top Gospel Artist of 2002 due to the success of her debut release Heart to Yours which was one of the best-selling gospel releases of the year. In 2013, Williams was honored in her hometown of Rockford, Illinois at the 2013 I Love Gospel Music honors luncheon, which featured musical tributes, including one by Sunday Best winner Amber Bullock.

== Personal life ==
Williams reportedly began dating pastor and professional sports chaplain Chad Johnson in July 2017. Williams and Johnson announced their engagement via People on April 19, 2018. In September 2018, the couple revealed plans to film a television series, showcasing their relationship as they navigate the road from engagement to marriage. On November 3, 2018, the reality show Chad Loves Michelle began airing on the Oprah Winfrey Network. In December 2018, Williams announced that she and Johnson had both called off their engagement.

=== Mental health ===
Williams has a history of depression, saying that she has "been suffering since the ages of 13 and 15". During her time with Destiny's Child, she says that she told their then manager Mathew Knowles about her feelings, but that he did not really understand. He replied to her concerns by trying to point out the good side of their new-found fame, "You all just signed a multi-millionaire dollar deal, you're about to go on tour, what have you got to be depressed about?"

She said that she had difficulty understanding her own feelings until later in life, around her thirties, stating that "I didn't know until I was in my 30s what was going on, I just thought it was growing pains, I just thought I'm turning into a woman." She also felt that Knowles intended no malice, and only had her best interests at heart, "Bless his heart... I think he wanted me to be grateful, which I was, but I was still sad."

Williams again felt helpless after she and her fiancé, Chad Johnson, split up in late 2018. She said the breakup left her "shattered and ... fighting suicidal thoughts." She said that she felt "so angry. The rage built up in me. I did not attempt suicide, but I was questioning [life]". Williams suffered a nervous breakdown just after opening day for a Broadway production of Once on This Island and was advised to leave the show by her doctor. By April 2020 she had returned to better health, saying that "I am in a better place now. I am not perfect. I'm not preaching ... When people say it gets better, it does. It just takes time. The days do get brighter".

==== Memoir ====
In November 2020, Williams announced plans to release a memoir "revealing her entire truth including a deeper dive into where her anxiety and depression came from." She stated, "I'm ready to share, I've been a very transparent person and now I'm ready to share the good, bad, and ugly parts of my journey—the concerning part of my journey. ... I really go into the specifics, I really go into the first time I was diagnosed, I go into assessing the first time I had anxiety in a romantic relationship and what it did to that relationship and then subsequently what it did to the next one." Williams said she hoped to "really help heal through my story" and "let people know what I do on a daily, what I do on a monthly–whatever it takes to get people whole and get people where they can maybe start seeing some better results in their own life."

The book titled Checking In: How Getting Real about Depression Saved My Life—and Can Save Yours was published on May 25, 2021.

== Philanthropy ==
In 2001, Williams made a "bountiful" donation of $148,900 to her church, St. Paul Church of God in Christ in Rockford, Illinois – of which she has been a member since birth – to finish construction of the church's school, St. Paul Academy. The church is pastored by her uncle, Bishop James E. Washington.

In 2005, music producer David Foster, his daughter Amy Foster-Gillies, and Knowles wrote "Stand Up for Love", which would serve as the anthem of World Children's Day, an event which takes place annually around the world on November 20 to raise awareness and funds for children's causes worldwide. Destiny's Child lent their voices and support as global ambassadors for the 2005 World Children's Day program. In this role, Knowles, Rowland and Williams visited Ronald McDonald Houses around the world during their Destiny Fulfilled... and Lovin' It World Tour and donated a portion of their North American ticket sales to Ronald McDonald House Charities.

In September 2006, Williams jump-started the Chicago PepsiCo S.M.A.R.T. – which stands for five simple steps that encourage active living and better food choices – program to promote active, healthy lifestyles by building a new "Smart Spot" playground in Chicago. Williams, along with friend Lance Bass, was on hand to sing to and greet kids at the opening of Camp Heartland, a camp dedicated to helping kids suffering from HIV/AIDS enjoy life and take their mind off their illness. In 2006, the Chicago Sky, a team in the Women's National Basketball Association, announced that Williams, along with Mathew Knowles, is part of a group of minority shareholder owners in the team.

In 2012, she became an ambassador for the American Heart Association's Power to End Stroke campaign. In speaking of her role she said "I am honored to partner with the campaign ... my father had a stroke in 2005 due to smoking, diabetes and an unhealthy diet, and my grandmother was diagnosed with having a stroke in 2006 when she went to her doctor for a simple outpatient procedure. I am bringing awareness to people so that strokes can be prevented. Let's take care of ourselves...the first step is knowledge about your health."

In 2014, Williams partnered with Hyundai's non-profit organization, Hope on Wheels, "committed to finding a cure for childhood cancer"; which has raised over $74,000,000 for the cause since its inception in 1998.

== Discography ==
- Heart to Yours (2002)
- Do You Know (2004)
- Unexpected (2008)
- Journey to Freedom (2014)

== Filmography ==
List of acting performances in film and television
Year	Title	Role	Notes	Source
2006	Half & Half	Naomi Dawson	Recurring role; three episodes	
2008	MTV's Top Pop Group	Herself	Judge; four episodes	
2009	Gospel Dream	Herself	Judge	
2009	RuPaul's Drag Race	Herself	Guest judge; season one, episode two ("Girl Groups")	
2010	Blessed & Cursed	Herself	Feature film; cameo appearance	
2010	Strictly Come Dancing	Herself	Eighth season contestant	
2010	You're Cut Off!	Herself	Guest appearance; season one, episode seven ("Giving Back")	
2011	What My Husband Doesn't Know	Lena Summer	Live performance	
2014	Fix My Choir	Herself	Host	
2015	The View	Herself	Guest co-host; four episodes	
2015	The Meredith Vieira Show	Herself	Guest; one episode	
2015	Family Time	Kim	Guest appearance; one episode	
2017	The Talk	Herself	Guest co-host; three episodes	
2018	Raven's Home	Shinée DuBois	Guest appearance; two episodes	
2018	Revival!	Mary Magdalen	Musical film	
2019	American Soul	Diana Ross	Guest appearance	
2019	The Masked Singer	Butterfly	Season two, episodes; one, four, six, nine	
2021	Christmas in Harmony	Melo D	Main cast	
2022	The Masked Singer	Rockhopper	Season three, episodes; two, four, five, six, seven	
2022	Wrath: A Seven Deadly Sins Story	Chastity Jeffries	Lead actress	
2022	The Masked Singer Australia	Microphone	Season four, episodes; five, seven, eight, nine	
2023	Praise This	Herself	Finals Host	
2023	Kingdom Business	Skye Johnson	Guest appearance; two episodes	
2023	Renaissance: A Film by Beyoncé	Herself	Cameo	

== Stage credits ==
Year	Title	Role	Notes	Source
2003	Aida	Aida	Lead role; Broadway	
2007	The Color Purple	Shug Avery	Supporting role; National Tour	
2009	Chicago	Roxie Hart	Lead role; West End	
2010	Chicago	Roxie Hart	Lead role; Broadway	
2010	Chicago	Roxie Hart	Lead role; National Tour (Los Angeles)	
2011	What My Husband Doesn't Know	Lena Summers	Lead role; National Tour	
2013	Fela!	Sandra Izsadore	Supporting role; National Tour	
2014	Jesus Christ Superstar	Mary Magdalene	Lead Role; National Tour (Cancelled)	
2016	Aida	Aida	Lead role; The Muny, St. Louis	
2018	Once on This Island	Erzulie	Supporting role; Broadway	
2019	Once on This Island	Erzulie	Supporting role; Broadway	
2019	A Snow White Christmas	The Wicked Queen	Supporting role; National Tour	
2022	Children of Eden	Eve/Mama Noah	Concert performance; Cadillac Palace Theatre, Chicago	
2024	Death Becomes Her	Viola Van Horn	Pre-Broadway Musical Adaptation; Cadillac Palace Theatre, Chicago	
2024	Death Becomes Her	Viola Van Horn	Broadway	

== Other works ==
=== Podcasts ===
Year	Title	Role	Notes	Ref.
2020–present	Checking In	Host	By The Black Effect and iHeart Podcast Network	
