= All Because of You (Marques Houston song) =

Single by Marques Houston featuring Young Rome

from the album Naked
- Released: March 23, 2005
- Length: 3:32
- Label: TUG
- Songwriters: Marques Houston; Jerome Jones; Richard Butler, Jr.; Dwayne Nesmiths; Pierre Medor; Van McCoy
- Producer: Tha Cornaboyz

Marques Houston singles chronology
"Because of You" (2004)	"All Because of You" (2005)	"Naked" (2005)

"All Because of You" is a song by American singer Marques Houston featuring American rapper Young Rome. It was written by Houston and Rome along with Rico Love, Dwayne Nesmiths and Pierre Medor for his second studio album, Naked (2005), with production helmed by Nesmiths and Medor under their production moniker Tha Cornaboyz. The song features a sample of the 1976 hit single, "Living Together (In Sin)" by American vocal group The Whispers. Due to the inclusion of the sample, Van McCoy is also credited as a songwriter. "All Because of You" was released only within the United States where it did well enough there to chart on the Billboard Hot 100, peaking at number sixty-nine.

== Music video ==
A music video for "All Because of You" shows Houston in a car driving to his apartment. When he arrives he finds out his girlfriend is moving out. It then shows her and Houston in the hallway. The video featured his former IMx bandmates, Young Rome and Kelton "LDB" Kessee. The music video was on constant rotation on BET's 106 & Park and has peaked at number one on the show's countdown for a week.

== Track listing ==
12" single
No.	Title	Writer(s)	Producer(s)	Length
1.	"All Because of You" (album version)	Marques Houston; Jerome Jones; Richard Butler, Jr.; Dwayne Nesmiths; Pierre Medor; Van McCoy	Tha Cornaboyz	3:30
2.	"All Because of You" (instrumental)	Houston; Jones; Butler; Nesmiths; Medor; McCoy	Tha Cornaboyz	3:30
3.	"Naked"	Harvey Mason Jr.; Damon Thomas; Eric Dawkins; Durrell Babbs; Steven Russell; Antonio Dixon	The Underdogs	4:27

Notes

- ^{^[a]} signifies co-producer(s)

== Credits and personnel ==
- Marques Houston – vocals, writer
- Rico Love – writer
- Van McCoy – writer (sample)
- Pierre Medor – additional vocals, keyboards, producer, writer
- Dwayne Nesmiths – keyboards, producer, writer
- Young Rome – vocals, writer

== Charts ==
=== Weekly charts ===
Weekly chart performance for "All Because of You"
Chart (2005)	Peak position
US Billboard Hot 100	69
US Hot R&B/Hip-Hop Songs (Billboard)	14

=== Year-end charts ===
Year-end chart performance for "All Because of You"
Chart (2005)	Position
US Hot R&B/Hip-Hop Songs (Billboard)	81
