= Naked (Marques Houston album) =

Studio album by Marques Houston
- Released: May 24, 2005
- Genres: R&B, soul
- Length: 44:38
- Labels: Ultimate; Universal
- Producers: Marques Houston; Henley Regisford Jr.; Chris Stokes; The Underdogs; Cory Bold; Chris "Rawdog" Denson; Brandon Howard; Pierre Medor; Rufus Blaq; Tank; Tiger DaBeat Banga

Marques Houston chronology
MH (2003)	Naked (2005)	Veteran (2007)

Singles from Naked
- 1. "All Because of You" Released: March 23, 2005; 2. "Naked" Released: July 20, 2005; 3. "Sex Wit You" Released: November 16, 2005

Naked is the second studio album by American R&B singer Marques Houston. It was released by The Ultimate Group and Universal Records on May 24, 2005 in the United States. Houston worked with a variety of producers on the album, including Chris Stokes, Cory Bold, Brandon Howard, Tha Corna Boyz, Rufus Blaq, Tank, and duo The Underdogs, among others. Guest vocalists on Naked include Joe Budden, Rufus Blaq, RaRa & Dame and fellow former Immature member Young Rome.

The album was noted for its blend of its mature themes and a shorter runtime that contributed to tighter quality control, though some critics found the album uneven and formulaic. In the United States, Naked debuted and peaked at number 13 on the Billboard 200, and number five on Billboard's Top R&B/Hip-Hop Albums chart. It sold nearly 400,000 copies domestically and in 2022, more than 17 years after its release, was certified Gold by the Recording Industry Association of America (RIAA).

== Critical reception ==
Professional ratings
Review scores
Source	Rating
AllMusic	3/5 stars

AllMusic editor Andy Kellman rated the album three out of five stars. He found that "Naked is no deeper than 2003's MH, which most of his fans will find perfectly acceptable. It offers a similar mix of earnest slow jams and sexually frank club tracks. The best moments involve adequate production facsimiles of Just Blaze, Kanye West, and The Neptunes. Another thing that works to Houston's benefit is the shorter running time: Naked's eleven songs are a lot easier to digest than MH's 17, which also means that there's better quality control." Gail Mitchell from Billboard felt that "Houston erases any remnants of his earlier stint as a member of boy group Immature with this solo effort. As the title implies, he reveals the healthy adult male he has become through songs that reflect the tenets of Marvin Gaye's sexual healing. Houston doesn't leave much to the imagination [but] steadies the album's uneven and often formulaic course with the engaging midtempo single "All Because of You" featuring Young Rome."

== Commercial performance ==
In the United States, Naked opened and peaked at number 13 on the Billboard 200, with first-week sales of 65,000 units. It also peaked at number five on Billboard's Top R&B/Hip-Hop Albums chart. By August 2006, the album had sold 390,000 copies domestically, according to Nielsen SoundScan. On November 30, 2022, more than 17 years after its release, Naked was certified Gold by the Recording Industry Association of America (RIAA).

== Track listing ==
Naked track listing
No.	Title	Writer(s)	Producer(s)	Length
1.	"All Because of You" (featuring Young Rome)	Pierre Medor; Dwayne Nesmith; Richard Butler Jr.; Jerome Jones; Rufus Moore; Van McCoy	Tha Corna Boyz	3:32
2.	"Sex wit You"	Harvey Mason Jr.; Damon Thomas; Eric Dawkins; Durrell Babbs; Steven Russell; Antonio Dixon	The Underdogs; Tank^{[a]}	4:39
3.	"Marriage"	Moore; Brandon Howard; Marques Houston	Rufus Blaq; Howard	4:14
4.	"12 O'clock" (featuring Joe Budden)	Houston; Cory Bold; Chris Stokes; Budden	Bold; Houston; Stokes	3:55
5.	"Naked"	Mason Jr.; Thomas; Babbs; Russell; Dixon	The Underdogs	4:27
6.	"Do You Mind"	Lamont Lassiter; Adonis Shropshire	Lassiter; Houston	4:15
7.	"Cheat"	Moore; Howard; Darryl Meyers; Houston	Blaq; Howard	3:58
8.	"I Wasn't Ready" (featuring Rufus Blaq)	Medor; Nesmith; Butler Jr.; Moore	Tha Corna Boyz	3:56
9.	"Something Else"	Houston; Chris "RawDog" Denson; Stokes	Denson; Houston; Stokes	3:08
10.	"I Like It" (featuring RaRa & Dame)	Houston; Bold; Stokes; David Newton; Lawrence Stephens	Bold; Houston	3:54
11.	"Everything"	Tiger Roberts	Tiger da Beat Banga	4:57
Total length:				44:38

Notes

- ^{^[a]} denotes co-producer

== Charts ==
=== Weekly charts ===
Weekly chart performance for Naked
Chart (2005)	Peak position
US Billboard 200	13
US Top R&B/Hip-Hop Albums (Billboard)	5

=== Year-end charts ===
Year-end chart performance for Naked
Chart (2005)	Position
US Top R&B/Hip-Hop Albums (Billboard)	59

== Certifications ==
Certifications for Naked
Region	Certification	Certified units/sales
United States (RIAA)	Gold	500,000^{‡}
^{‡} Sales+streaming figures based on certification alone.
