= Do You Know (Michelle Williams album) =

Studio album by Michelle Williams
- Released: January 26, 2004
- Recorded: November 2002 – May 2003
- Genres: Gospel; R&B
- Length: 55:47
- Label: Columbia
- Producers: Cedric Caldwell; Victor Caldwell; Anson Dawkins; Eric Dawkins; Troy Johnson; Solange Knowles; Loren McGee; PAJAM; Eric Pullins; Tommy Sims; Soul Diggaz; Tim Weatherspoon; Erron Williams

Michelle Williams chronology
Heart to Yours (2002)	Do You Know (2004)	Unexpected (2008)

Singles from Do You Know
- 1. "Do You Know" Released: December 20, 2003; 2. "My Only Love Is You" Released: 2004

Do You Know is the second studio album by American singer and songwriter Michelle Williams. It was released by the Sanctuary Records Group and Columbia Records on January 26, 2004 in the United States. Do You Know "straddles between contemporary gospel and inspirational R&B" and is described as portraying "a more intimate side of Michelle". It contains a greater percentage of mid and up-tempo songs, along with a much heavier and grander use of live instrumentation. Williams contributed lyrically to the album as she did with her debut album, co-writing a total of six songs. However, Do You Know is much more diverse, lyrically, than its predecessor Heart to Yours, covering the themes of "spiritual" and "carnal" love and contains retrospective songs about Williams' career thus far, whilst still retaining the inspirational and encouraging lyrics that characterized Heart to Yours.

In the US, Do You Know found fair success on Billboard's component charts; peaking at number two on the Gospel Albums chart, number three on the Christian Albums chart and number twenty-eight on the Top R&B/Hip-Hop Albums chart. Despite the high-performing single and though the album was well received by critics, the album peaked at 120 on the Billboard 200, making it Williams' lowest-charting album. Despite this, the album was later re-released, including two new tracks and has now sold over 78,000 copies in the US alone as of 2008. The album gained Williams a nomination for Best Gospel Act at the 2004 MOBO Awards.

== Background and composition ==
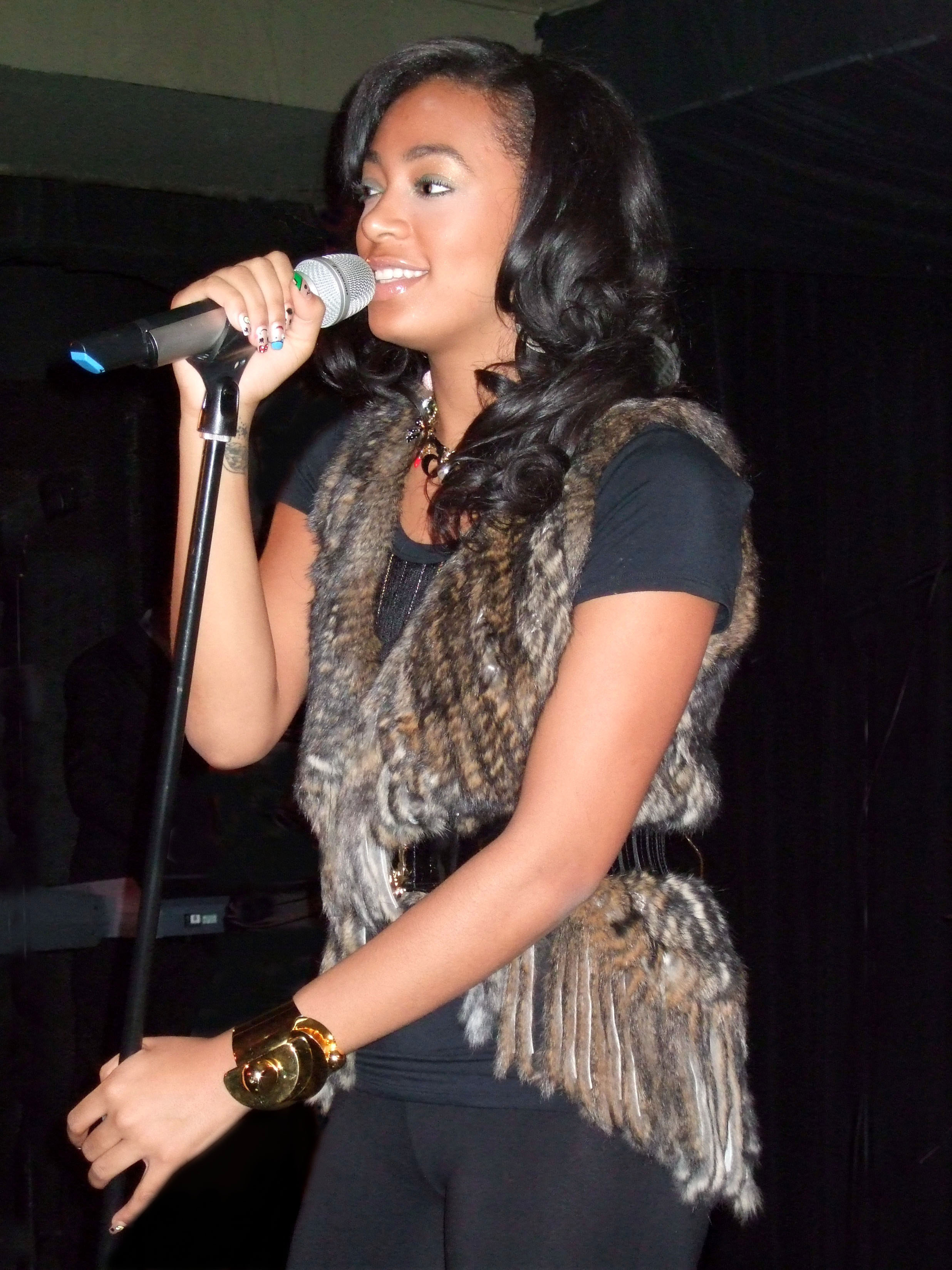
Solange Knowles (pictured) co-wrote and co-produced "The Movement".

After becoming the first member of Destiny's Child to release a solo album in 2002, Williams did not wait long to start work on its follow-up in 2003. Due to the success of Heart to Yours, which topped the US Top Gospel Albums and became the best-selling gospel album of 2002, anticipation was high for Williams' second album. Before taking over the lead role in the Broadway musical Aida on November 18, 2003, Williams began working on the album, involving an even greater variety of producers than she did for her debut album such as trio PAJAM, made up of Paul Allen, J. Moss and Walter Kearney, duo Dawkins & Dawkins, Tommy Sims, bandmate Beyoncé Knowles, her sister Solange Knowles, and Williams' brother Erron Williams. As with her debut, Williams contributed greatly to the songwriting of the album, co-writing a total of six tracks on the album.

Prior to Do You Know's release, Williams told MTV that she couldn't "wait for the world to hear [her] new solo album", describing it as "fresher", "more inspirational", and "more on the secular side". Furthermore, she stated "whether it's gospel or not, I wrote about it", therefore expecting "some of her gospel fans to be a little upset" but wanted to "keep it real". She also discussed one of the album's primary themes – "what it's like to be in love" – explaining "[I talk about] mistakes you make when you're in love and how they affect your life" after saying "I was able to experience some things this year and I wrote about them." In describing the album during another interview, this time for GospelCity, Williams said "these songs are just about the real me" and that she "just wrote from [her] heart" before acknowledging that "it didn't turn out to be as 'gospel-ly' as some would have liked", but "the stuff" that's on the album "is stuff [she] went through". Williams then said "this whole album is about God's love and me". After being asked "Michelle, as people listen to the album, Do You Know, as they get acquainted with the songs, what are you hoping to bring to their lives?", Williams responded "That everybody live in peace and not settle for anything less than what the Lord wants to bring your way. I know what I went through, I know God is taking me to another level. I had people around me that were not going where I was going – I had to release them from my life."

== Critical reception ==
Professional ratings
Review scores
Source	Rating
AllMusic	3.5/5 stars
Cross Rhythms	8/10 squares
Entertainment Weekly	B−
The Guardian	3/5 stars
Now	2/5 Ns
People	2.5/4 stars
Yahoo! Music UK	3/10

Critical reviews of the album were generally favorable. Kwaku of Cross Rhythms wrote that "Michelle seems happy to produce music which straddles between contemporary gospel and inspirational R&B" and thus "she certainly isn’t going to have problems facing the congregation when she attends church". Sony of Gospel City described the album as a "beautifully written [...] very wonderfully produced gospel album that in some places is a throwback to a Duke Ellington jazz minuet, in others it's a fast paced hip-hop laced gospel after-party, and in others it's a beautiful testimony of a woman at the well" He then went on to comment that "the true highlight of this album is Michelle's unique, yet beautiful, timbre and her magnificent song writing." Caroline Sullivan of The Guardian however gave a more mixed review, commenting that Do You Know? "doesn't provide the running start" that Williams "needs". She then noted that "Williams's strength is a shimmery jazz lilt.

Emily Sogn of PopMatters likened Williams' "pleasingly slow paced" singing style to pop contemporaries like Ashanti and Janet Jackson and described the album as "a decent, yet not spectacular sophomore effort", noting that "while it might not enough to ensure her a successful career outside of her contributions to Destiny's Child, it isn’t without its particular merits and shining moments". People magazine commented that "there is a contemporary R&B sound" to the album "that wouldn't be out of place on secular radio" and noted that "The Movement" "has a hip-hop vibe, while glossy ballads like "The Way of Love" sound like they could be Destiny's Child slow jams". Entertainment Weekly editor Chris Willman rated the album B− and highlighted the artistic growth on the album. Comparing it to its predecessor he wrote "this second solo foray into contemporary spirituals vastly improves upon her godforsaken 2002 debut" and that "both the beats and girlish chops feel more seasoned, even if she'll always be more R&B minimalist than the gospel powerhouse she aspires to be". AllMusic wrote that "working with a wide array of producers [...] Williams is subtly more up-tempo than on her debut." The staff found that the songs "all point to an artist with a considerable amount of self-assurance. Not surprisingly, Williams is never far from the roots that extend back to her day job in Destiny's Child."

== Release and performance ==
First released on January 26, 2004, Do You Know preceded the release of Destiny's Child's fifth and final regular studio album Destiny Fulfilled, making Williams the only member of the group to release more than one solo album in the group's hiatus. Williams promoted the album during various TV appearances and live performances, some of the most notable include; live performances of "Do You Know" (the album's first single) and "Purpose In Your Storm" on various TBN programs and a live performance of a newly arranged version of "The Way of Love" on Regis & Kelly. Notably, Williams also performed "Do You Know" live on the 2004 Soul Train Music Awards and throughout the Destiny Fulfilled ... And Lovin' It world concert tour – which visited 16 countries throughout Australia, Asia, Europe, and North America with 67 dates in total. A video and audio recording of one such performance of "Do You Know", recorded in Atlanta was included on the Live in Atlanta 2006 DVD release, which has since been re-issued on Blu-ray. "Do You Know" was also promoted with the filming and release of a music video for the song.

Like its predecessor, Do You Know achieved its greatest commercial success on Billboard's component charts. Almost topping the Gospel Albums chart, the album peaked at number two, where it had its longest chart run, staying on the chart for 20 weeks, resulting in its placement at number twenty-five on Billboard's Year-End Gospel Albums chart. Meanwhile, the album peaked at number three on Billboard's Christian Albums chart, remaining on the chart for six weeks and peaked at number twenty-eight on the Top R&B/Hip-Hop Albums chart, where it spent five weeks. However, Do You Know only managed to hold one week on the main US albums chart – the Billboard 200 – where it peaked at number one-hundred-and-twenty. On November 14, 2004, The New York Times reported the album had sold 59,262 units in the US and in 2008, Billboard reported US sales of 78,000 copies.

== Track listing ==
Do You Know – Standard edition
No.	Title	Writer(s)	Producer(s)	Length
1.	"Purpose in Your Storm"	Michelle Williams; Tommy Sims	Sims	4:21
2.	"Never Be the Same"	Sims	Sims	5:38
3.	"Love Thang" (featuring Dawkins & Dawkins)	Eric Dawkins; Anson Dawkins	Dawkins & Dawkins	4:38
4.	"Do You Know"	M. Williams; Erron Williams; Eric Pullins	E. Williams	4:28
5.	"The Incident"	Sims	Sims	3:13
6.	"My Only Love Is You"	E. Williams; James Brown; St. Clair Pinckney; Loren McGee; Karees Brown; Tim Weatherspoon	E. Williams	3:48
7.	"15 Minutes"	M. Williams; Sims	Sims	4:42
8.	"No One Like You"	M. Williams; Pullins; E. Williams	E. Williams; Pullins	3:35
9.	"The Way of Love"	Paul Allen; J. Moss	PAJAM	3:42
10.	"Rescue My Heart"	Angie Winans; Cedric Caldwell; Victor Caldwell	C. Caldwell; V. Caldwell	5:03
11.	"Didn't Know"	M. Williams; McGee; K. Brown; Weatherspoon	Erron Williams	3:48
12.	"The Movement"	Solange Knowles; Troy Johnson	Knowles; Johnson	3:04
13.	"Have You Ever"	Margaret Bell-Byars; Winans; C. Caldwell; V. Caldwell	C. Caldwell; V. Caldwell	4:55
14.	"I Know" (Destiny's Child)	Beyoncé Knowles; Corte Ellis; Jully Black; K Mack; Lashaun Owens	Knowles; Soul Diggaz	3:32

Do You Know – Re-release edition
No.	Title	Writer(s)	Producer(s)	Length
1.	"It's Good to Be Here"	Percy Bady	Bady	4:05
2.	"Purpose in Your Storm"	Michelle Williams; Tommy Sims	Sims	4:21
3.	"Never Be the Same"	Sims	Sims	5:38
4.	"Love Thang" (featuring Dawkins & Dawkins)	Eric Dawkins; Anson Dawkins	Dawkins & Dawkins	4:38
5.	"Do You Know"	M. Williams; Erron Williams; Eric Pullins	E. Williams	4:28
6.	"The Incident"	Sims	Sims	3:13
7.	"My Only Love Is You"	E. Williams; James Brown; St. Clair Pinckney; Loren McGee; Karees Brown; Tim Weatherspoon	E. Williams	3:48
8.	"15 Minutes"	M. Williams; Sims	Sims	4:42
9.	"No One Like You"	M. Williams; Pullins; E. Williams	E. Williams; Pullins	3:35
10.	"The Way of Love"	Paul Allen; J. Moss	PAJAM	3:42
11.	"Amazing Love"	Bady; Michelle Williams; Rodney East	Bady	4:59
12.	"Didn't Know"	Angie Winans; Cedric Caldwell; Victor Caldwell	C. Caldwell; V. Caldwell	3:48
13.	"The Movement"	Solange Knowles; Troy Johnson	Knowles; Johnson	3:04
14.	"Have You Ever"	Margaret Bell-Byars; Winans; C. Caldwell; V. Caldwell	C. Caldwell; V. Caldwell	4:55

Samples

- "My Only Love Is You" contains a sample of James Brown's "You're My Only Love", written by James Brown and St. Clair Pickney.

== Personnel ==
Credits are taken from the album's liner notes.

Managerial

- A&R – Kim Burse, Huy Nguyen, Teresa LaBarbera Whites
- Executive producer – Mathew Knowles

Performance credits

- Lead vocals – Michelle Williams
- Background vocals – Michelle Williams, Margaret Bell-Byars, Angie Winans, Carvin Winans, Juan Winans, Karees Brown, Jesse Campbell, DeBette Draper, Felicia East, Erika Jerry, J. Moss, Tommy Sims, Jerard Woods

Visuals and Imagery

- Art direction – Ian Cuttler, Ellen To
- Photography – Christopher Kolk
- Stylist – Tina Knowles

Instruments

- Conductor – Tim Akers
- Bass – Derrick Ray, Tony Russell
- Cello – Lynn Piethman
- Drums – Andy Selby, Curtis Zachary, Michael Weatherspoon
- Flugelhorn – Mike Haynes
- Guitar – Al Willis, Michael Ripoll, Paul Jackson Jr.
- Horn – Mike Haynes, Steve Patrick
- Keyboard – Andy Selby, Rodney East
- Trombone – Barry Green
- Organ – Rodney East
- Percussion – Ken Lewis
- Saxophone – Jim Horn
- Strings – The Positive Movement Orchestra
- Trumpet – Lloyd Barry

Technical and Production

- Concertmaster – Karl Gorodestky
- Conductor – Tim Akers
- Engineers – Ernie Allen, Ced C, Jim Caruana, Steve Goldsmith, Danny Leake, Joey Fernandez, Rommel Villanueava
- Engineering assistants – Ternae Jordan Jr., Dwight Levens
- Mastering – Tom Coyne
- Mixing – Danny Leake, Ced C, Joey Fernandez, Dabling Harward, Todd Kozey, Bryan Lenox, Dave Pensado, Tony Shepperd, Larry Sturm
- Music Producers – Paul "PDA" Allen, Cedric Caldwell, Victor Caldwell, Anson Dawkins, Eric Dawkins, Troy Johnson, Beyoncé Knowles, Solange Knowles, Loren McGee, PAJAM, Eric Pullins, Tommy Sims, Tim Weatherspoon, Erron Williams
- Vocal Producers – Angie Winans, Michelle Williams, Karees Brown, Jesse Campbell, Anson Dawkins, Eric Dawkins, Steve Goldsmith, Tommy Sims

== Charts ==
=== Weekly charts ===
Chart (2004)	Peak position
US Billboard 200	120
US Top R&B/Hip-Hop Albums (Billboard)	28
US Top Gospel Albums (Billboard)	2
US Top Christian Albums (Billboard)	3

=== Year-end charts ===
Chart (2004)	Peak position
US Top Gospel Albums (Billboard)	25

== Release history ==
Region	Date	Edition	Format	Label
Germany	January 26, 2004	Standard	CD, digital download	Sony Music Entertainment
United Kingdom	January 26, 2004	Standard	CD, digital download	Sony Music Entertainment
United States	January 26, 2004	Standard	CD, digital download	Columbia Records
Japan	January 28, 2004	Standard	CD	Sony Music
United States	November 16, 2005	Reissue	CD	Music World
Germany	November 29, 2004	Reissue	CD	Sanctuary Records
