= The Greatest (Michelle Williams song) =

Single by Michelle Williams

from the album Unexpected
- Released: September 9, 2008
- Recorded: 2007
- Studio: The Record Plant (Los Angeles)
- Genre: Pop
- Length: 3:32
- Label: Music World; Columbia
- Songwriters: Rico Love; James Scheffer
- Producer: Jim Jonsin

Michelle Williams singles chronology
"We Break the Dawn" (2008)	"The Greatest" (2008)	"Hello Heartbreak" (2008)

"The Greatest" is a ballad recorded by American singer-songwriter Michelle Williams. It was co-written by Jim Jonsin and Rico Love, and produced by Jim Jonsin for Williams' third studio album Unexpected (2008). The song was released as the album's second single in September 2008. It was listed at number thirty-nine on Billboard's decade-end (2000–2009) Hot Dance Club Songs chart, one place behind "Lose My Breath", which Williams recorded as a member of Destiny's Child five years prior.

== Background and composition ==
"The Greatest" (2008)
A 34-second sample of the second verse and chorus.

The song was sent to radio stations on August 25, 2008. The track was also officially released and available to purchase September 9, 2008. The song gained more recognition after being used in the movie Noah's Arc: Jumping The Broom. Michelle performed the song on Fox Light, Jimmy Kimmel Live! and AOL Sessions.

The Greatest is a "pop ballad". Written by Rico Love and James Scheffer (better known as Jim Jonsin) and also produced by Scheffer, it is set in common time and composed at a moderate tempo, featuring additional vocals by Rico Love along with a piano riff and a militant drum loop. The song has a basic sequence of C-G-Am-F as its chord progression. Its lyrical content "details the unnecessary search for a significant other when a perfect candidate is right in front of your face". Williams' vocal range in the song spans almost two octaves from the note G_{3} to the note F_{5}.

== Critical reception ==
Like the other singles from Unexpected, "The Greatest" received universally positive reviews from critics. Ben Norman of About.com hailed the song as "a fantastic pop ballad" while Robin Carolan of Slant Magazine noted that "in the lush balladry of "The Greatest," Williams could find the hit she needs". DJ Z of DJBooth.net wrote that the song is a "solid single selection", while it received a rating of four out of five stars, based on forty-four ratings by the site's users. Meanwhile, Story Gilmore of Neon Limelight wrote that Williams "nails the vocals!" on "The Greatest" which she described positively as "pretty ding moist".

== Commercial performance ==
Despite the single receiving minor airplay in the US, "The Greatest" received much play in clubs and so it debuted at number fifty-four on the Billboard Hot Dance Club Play chart before eventually peaking at number one – becoming Williams' second consecutive, top 5 hit on the chart. "The Greatest" also peaked at number twenty-five on the Billboard Global Dance Tracks chart. The song was listed at number thirty-nine on Billboard's decade-end (2000–2009) Hot Dance Club Songs chart, just behind "Lose My Breath" which Williams recorded as a member of Destiny's Child five years prior.

== Music video ==
The video was shot on September 22 in Los Angeles, California and was directed by Thomas Kloss. It later premiered on Yahoo! on October 20, 2008. In November 2008, the video peaked at number seventy-six on the US Hot 100 Music Video chart and has peaked at number thirty-two on the Yahoo Top 100 R&B Music Video chart.

The video starts with "a capture of" Williams "donning a black tube gown and singing the song on her bed", frequently cutting to scenes of a man on a "field", "coaching his football players". The video then solely focuses on Williams during the first verse, who is also seen sporting a reasonably short, purple cocktail dress in a sitting room during another scene. Other scenes feature Williams posing with various items of clothing in a black dress, in front of a white screen and walking around an outdoor swimming pool in a cream-colored dress with, brown, high-heeled shoes. As the video progresses, scenes of other men; a US athlete running on a track, a fireman and a mechanic working on a car are included. The video concludes with Williams opening a large, wooden door outside, before the scene fades completely into white, ending the video.

R. Thomas of Tha Feedback described the video as "sweet and innocent", writing that "Michelle looks all warm and friendly". Thomas then commented that "this is good video for this song", before describing the song as "a nice mid-tempo ballad".

== Formats and track listing ==
Digital download

1. "The Greatest" – 3:31

Digital download – US Remixes EP

1. "The Greatest" (Redtop Remix – Club Version) – 6:47
2. "The Greatest" (Mark Picchiotti Remix – Club Version) – 7:50
3. "The Greatest" (Craig C. & Niques Master Remix – Club Version) – 7:30
4. "The Greatest" (Zigmund Slezak Remix – Club Version) – 7:09
5. "The Greatest" (Dan McKie Remix – Club Version) – 7:30
6. "The Greatest" (Catalyst Remix – Main) – 3:55
7. "The Greatest" (Jason Nevins Remix – Extended Club Mix) – 7:00
8. "The Greatest" (Maurice's Nu Soul Remix – Main) – 7:00
9. "The Greatest" (Mr. Mig & D. Roc Mainstream Mixshow Edit – Extended Club Mix) – 6:12
10. "The Greatest" (Mr. Mig Extended Club Mix) – 7:16

== Credits and personnel ==
Credits adapted from the liner notes of Unexpected.

- Jim Jonsin – producer, writer
- Rico Love – vocal producer, writer
- Dan Nain – recording engineer
- Frank Romano – bass, guitar
- Chad "C-Note" Roper – recording engineer
- Phil Tan – mixing engineer

== Charts ==
=== Weekly charts ===
Chart (2008)	Peak position
Global Dance Tracks (Billboard)	25
US Dance Club Songs (Billboard)	1

=== Decade-end charts ===
Chart (2000–2009)	Position
US Dance Club Songs (Billboard)	39
