= We Break the Dawn =

Single by Michelle Williams

from the album Unexpected
- Released: March 31, 2008
- Recorded: 2007; Waveview Studios; Chalice Studios (Los Angeles, California)
- Genre: Electro-R&B
- Length: 3:54
- Label: Music World; Columbia
- Songwriters: Solange Knowles; Andrew Frampton; Wayne Wilkins
- Producers: Wayne Wilkins; Andrew Frampton

Michelle Williams singles chronology
"Let's Stay Together" (2005)	"We Break the Dawn" (2008)	"The Greatest'" (2008)

Music video
- "We Break the Dawn" on YouTube

"We Break the Dawn" is a song recorded by American singer-songwriter Michelle Williams. It was written by Solange Knowles, Andrew Frampton and Wayne Wilkins and produced by Wilkins and Frampton for Williams' third studio album Unexpected (2008). Officially premiering as the album's lead single on the People.com website on March 31, 2008, the single received critical acclaim for its "terrific fusion of European disco and dance-pop" and "irresistible" chorus.

"We Break the Dawn" topped the US Billboard Hot Dance Airplay chart and peaked at number four on the Hot Dance Club Play chart, but failed to chart on the Billboard Hot 100. The single became Williams' first song to chart on the UK Singles Chart, where it debuted and peaked at number forty-seven. The song was nominated for "Best R&B Vocal Performance By a Female Artist" in the 2008 NewNowNext Awards.

== Background ==
"Stop This Car", was originally rumored to be the lead single from Unexpected, however it was later confirmed as the second single – only to be later changed in favor of "The Greatest". "We Break the Dawn" was the first solo original release by Williams that was not distinctly Gospel in style or genre, causing the song to gain much media attention online. In describing Williams's new artistic direction, Hillary Crosley wrote, "there's a clear move away from the gospel." When the song premiered on People.com, Brian Orloff posted, "It's a hot new look and new sound." Meanwhile, noted UK R&B writer Pete Lewis of the award-winning Blues & Soul stated: "Williams' first solo pop/R&B LP 'Unexpected' is pioneered by the electro-club grooves of its melodically-soulful offshoot single 'We Break The Dawn'."

== Writing and composition ==
"We Break The Dawn" (2008)
Williams's most successful and lead single from Unexpected

"We Break the Dawn" was written by Solange Knowles, Andrew Frampton and Wayne Wilkins. Produced by Frampton and Wilkins, it is a fairly up-tempo electro-R&B song which incorporates various other genres such as synthpop, Europop and dance-pop. The song is composed in common time and Williams' vocal range in the song spans just over two octaves from the note G_{3} to A_{5}. Though an array of official remixes were produced and released, the most notable is the "DJ Montay Remix", which is also featured on Unexpected (titled "We Break the Dawn (Part 2)") along with the original version."Part 2" features Florida rapper Flo Rida – who raps in the intro and performs a verse towards the end of the song.

== Critical reception ==
Professional ratings
Review scores
Source	Rating
Digital Spy	4/5 stars

Critical response to the song was universally positive. Nick Levine of Digital Spy described the song as "A terrific fusion of European disco and American R&B", awarding it four stars out of five and even comparing it to "Work" by Michelle's former band-mate Kelly Rowland after describing the chorus as growing "more irresistible with every listen". Keith Caulfield of Billboard listed "We Break the Dawn" as one of his favorite tracks and singles of 2008., whilst Nick Levine, also writing for Billboard, described the song as being one of the "shiny electro-R&B gems...that make Williams' journey from church to club as enjoyable as it was inevitable". Ben Norman of About.com hailed the song as an "immensely catchy mid-tempo jam" that is "carefree" and "has a certain amount of memorability in the synth riff and the laid-back party lyrics". Meanwhile, Robin Carolan of Slant Magazine described Williams' "embracing" of "au courant euro-pop sounds" as "a move that works well for her", going on to state that it "boasts a chorus wrapped up in some awesome swirling synth-pop majestics" and despite doing "relatively well on the dance charts" it "deserved to cross over".

== Release and promotion ==
On April 15, 2008, "We Break the Dawn" was released digitally in the US and physically on July 8, 2008. In the UK, the single was only released digitally on September 22, 2008. In the US, Williams promoted the song (most notably) via live performances on The Wendy Williams Show, The Early Show and appearances on Good Day LA and TRL. In the UK, Williams promoted the song on the television show Loose Women. The song peaked within the top 50 of the UK Singles Chart. "We Break The Dawn" was featured on the season premiere of The City as well as, the season finale of America's Best Dance Crew and the film Noah's Arc: Jumping the Broom – along with Unexpected's second single "The Greatest". Williams appeared as a guest judge in the episode "Girl Groups" of RuPaul's Drag Race, which featured a lip-sync to the song between contestants Akashia and Tammie Brown.

== Chart performance ==
Through the week ending June 8, "We Break the Dawn" had sold 12,000 digital downloads in the US according to Nielsen SoundScan. "We Break the Dawn" peaked at number four on the Billboard Hot Dance Club Play chart, after debuting at number 47. It also topped the US Billboard Hot Dance Airplay chart, where it debuted at number 16 and peaked at number 26 on the Billboard Global Dance Tracks chart. In the UK, the single debuted and peaked at number 47 – becoming Michelle's first song or album to chart in the UK – before dropping to number 82 in its second week on the UK Singles Chart. The single also charted in the Commonwealth of Independent States and Hungary, where it peaked at number 38 on the Hungarian Radio Top 40 on January 12, 2009 and was later listed at number 174 on the 2009-year-end chart.

== Music video ==
The video, directed by Phil Griffin, was shot on April 23, 2008 in downtown Los Angeles and premiered on May 20, 2008. It features Williams dancing in the empty streets of a city with her background dancers. The video was also used for the "DJ Montay Remix" featuring Flo-Rida and the "Karmatronic Remix" with alternate scenes. The video reached number 5 on the MTV Base chart video countdown chart. In the UK, the video premiered on 4music on August 23, 2008 and reached number 34 on the TV Airplay Chart published by Music Week.

== Formats and track listing ==
Digital Download

1. "We Break the Dawn" – 3:56

Digital Download – Remixes EP

1. "We Break the Dawn Part 2" (DJ Montay Remix) (featuring Flo Rida) – 4:22
2. "We Break the Dawn" (Lost Daze Remix) – 6:11
3. "We Break the Dawn" (Karmatronic Club Remix) – 5:24
4. "We Break the Dawn" (Mr. Mig Remix) – 6:00
5. "We Break the Dawn" (Lost Daze Dub Remix) – 6:11

Digital Download – The Mixes, Pt. 2

1. "We Break the Dawn" (Moto Blanco Club Mix) – 7:45
2. "We Break the Dawn" (Moto Blanco Dub Mix) – 7:28
3. "We Break the Dawn" (Moto Blanco Radio Mix) – 4:04
4. "We Break the Dawn" (Wideboys Electro Club Mix) – 5:47
5. "We Break the Dawn" (Wideboys Electro Dub) – 5:22
6. "We Break the Dawn" (Wideboys Bassline Remix) – 6:05
7. "We Break the Dawn" (Wideboys Radio Edit) – 3:25

Digital Download – UK (2)

1. "We Break the Dawn" (Album Version) – 3:52
2. "We Break the Dawn" (Karmatronic Remix – Radio Edit) – 2:56
3. "We Break the Dawn" (Lost Daze Remix Radio Edit) – 4:16

Digital Download – UK (3)

1. "We Break the Dawn" (Album Version) – 3:52
2. "We Break the Dawn Part 2" (DJ Montay Remix)(featuring Flo Rida) – 4:22
3. "We Break the Dawn" (Moto Blanco Radio Mix) – 4:04
4. "We Break the Dawn" (Wideboys Remix – Radio Edit) – 3:25
5. "We Break the Dawn" (Karmatronic Remix – Radio Edit) – 2:56

US CD single

1. "We Break the Dawn" (Album Version) – 3:52
2. "We Break the Dawn" (Lost Daze Club Mix) – 6:14
3. "We Break the Dawn" (Karmatronic Club Remix) – 5:25
4. "We Break the Dawn" (Mr. Mig Remix) – 6:02
5. "We Break the Dawn" (Maurice Joshua Remix) – 6:36
6. "We Break the Dawn" (Lost Daze Dub Mix) – 6:11

12" Maxi Single

Side one

1. "We Break the Dawn" (Album Version) – 3:52
2. "We Break the Dawn" (Lost Daze Remix) – 6:11
3. "We Break the Dawn" (Karmatronic Club Remix) – 5:24
4. "We Break the Dawn Part 2" (DJ Montay Remix) (featuring Flo Rida) – 4:22

Side two

1. "We Break the Dawn" (Mr. Mig Remix) 6:02
2. "Hello Heartbreak" (Album Version) – 4:07
3. "Hello Heartbreak" (Lost Daze Deep Inside Mix) – 7:01
4. "Hello Heartbreak" (KOVAS Ghetto Beat Remix) – 4:21

== Credits and personnel ==
Credits adapted from the liner notes of Unexpected.

- Andrew Frampton – engineer, production, writer
- Solange Knowles – writer
- Wayne Wilkins – engineer, production, writer
- Michelle Williams – vocals

== Charts ==
=== Weekly charts ===
Chart (2008–2009)	Peak position
CIS Airplay (TopHit)	161
Global Dance Tracks (Billboard) featuring Flo-Rida	26
Hungary (Rádiós Top 40)	38
UK Singles (Official Charts)	47
UK Singles Downloads (Official Charts)	46
UK Upfront Club Top 40 (Music Week)	25
US Hot Singles Sales (Billboard) featuring Flo-Rida	34
US Dance Club Songs (Billboard) featuring Flo-Rida	4
US Dance Airplay (Billboard) featuring Flo-Rida	1

=== Year-end charts ===
Chart (2008)	Position
US Dance/Mix Show Airplay (Billboard) featuring Flo-Rida	25
Chart (2009)	Position
Hungary (Rádiós Top 100)	174

== Release history ==
List of release dates, showing region, release format, and reference
Region	Date	Format(s)	Label	Ref
United States	April 15, 2008	Digital download	Music World; Columbia	
United States	July 8, 2008	CD; vinyl; maxi	Music World; Columbia	
United Kingdom	September 22, 2008	Digital download	Music World; Columbia	
