= Unexpected (Michelle Williams album) =

2008 studio album by Michelle Williams

Studio album by Michelle Williams
- Released: August 12, 2008
- Genres: Dance-pop; electronica; R&B
- Length: 46:00
- Labels: Columbia; Music World
- Producers: Raymond "Shonny B" Hilton; Andrew Frampton; Erron Williams; Jackpot; Royal XVI, Dwayne "Dtown" Nesmith; Jazz Nixon; DJ Montay; Jack Kugell; James Jones; Jason Pennock; REO; Ehood and E2; Jim Jonsin; Rico Love; Soulshock & Karlin; Stargate; Wayne Wilkins

Michelle Williams chronology
Do You Know (2004)	Unexpected (2008)	Journey to Freedom (2014)

Singles from Unexpected
- 1. "We Break the Dawn" Released: April 15, 2008; 2. "The Greatest" Released: September 9, 2008; 3. "Hello Heartbreak" Released: December 2, 2008

Unexpected is the third solo studio album by American singer Michelle Williams. It was released by Columbia Records and Music World Entertainment on October 7, 2008, in North America. Her first solo project following the disbandment of her group Destiny's Child in 2006, it marked Williams' first full-length dance-influenced commercial pop album, moving away from the gospel style of her previous efforts Heart to Yours (2002) and Do You Know (2004). Unexpected fuses dance-pop, R&B and electronic music to form a wide selection of up-tempo, beat-driven, club-oriented songs which gradually calm into slower material more R&B in sound and style.

Recording sessions for the album originally began in 2005, with the songs being mostly mid-tempo contemporary R&B and soul songs, however, after playing the "first sketch" of the album to her mother, Williams says she was "challenged" to go back and record songs that "people could dance to" and so in 2007 Williams began working extensively with producer, songwriter and arranger Rico Love to create an entirely new album – which Williams would later sum up simply as "unexpected". In addition, producers such as Jim Jonsin, Soulshock & Karlin, and Stargate, and Wayne Wilkins contributed to the track listing.

Upon its release, the album earned positive reviews from critics, with many complimenting Williams's decision to breakaway from her earlier projects, the album's production and the overall direction of the album. Unexpected debuted and peaked at number forty-two and number eleven on the US Billboard 200 and US Billboard Top R&B/Hip-Hop Albums charts respectively, selling 14,618 copies in the United States in its first week of release. The album spawned three singles – "We Break the Dawn", which preceded the release of the album, "The Greatest" and "Hello Heartbreak". Unexpected was Williams' last release through Columbia.

== Background ==
With the release of two previous albums, Heart to Yours (2002) and Do You Know(2004), Williams had established herself as a promising success in the gospel music industry, topping and dominating the US Billboard Gospel Albums chart in 2002, selling over 200,000 units of her debut album and 78,000 of her second. Williams had also pursued acting, starring in the Broadway musical Aida in 2003 and the 2007 touring production of The Color Purple, which earned her an award for "Lead Female Actress" in 2008 at the 18th Annual NAACP Theatre Awards. Additionally, Williams made her television debut with a recurring role as Naomi in three episodes of UPN's sitcom Half & Half.

In 2005 however, during an interview with MTV about Destiny's Child's #1's album and last single "Stand Up For Love", Beyoncé Knowles said Williams was "working on her third solo album" which "may veer from gospel" to a more "mainstream R&B" sound. Also referenced in the article is Williams' cover of the Al Green classic, "Let's Stay Together" that was not only featured in a Gap commercial but also on the Roll Bounce soundtrack. In 2006, Williams confirmed her change of musical direction and sound explaining, "I know my first two albums were gospel, but I'm going to do some soul music because I love R&B music, so I'm excited about that opportunity" at Clive Davis's annual pre-Grammy party. Williams also expressed great interest in working with Anthony Hamilton, John Legend and Bonnie Raitt, stating that the album would "hopefully" "be out at the end of [the] year [or] early next year".

== Production and development ==
The "first sketch" of Unexpected is believed to have been made up of primarily contemporary R&B music, partially due to a previously unreleased song titled "Stay for a Minute", dated to 2006, that Williams released for free online via her Twitter in 2010 and statements made by herself and former-bandmate Beyoncé in 2005 and 2006. However, Williams explained throughout many of the promotional interviews and television appearances for the album, that her mother "challenged" her "to record another album" – something that "people could dance to" – and so Williams started recording songs that drew inspiration from dance and electronic music to form another album.

While explaining this story (shortly before performing) for Fox Light she heralded Unexpected as being "the best one out of two". Williams discussed during interviews for FuseOnDemand and Fox News, that the album title came about after she was asked by her manager "to sum up" the "album with one word", at which point she replied "unexpected" and thus the album was titled. With two chart-topping contemporary gospel albums to her name, Williams revealed the reason for the dramatic change in sound and genre for Unexpected in an interview with Clayton Perry of Blogcritics in which she cited her "heart" as her sole inspiration for the change she orchestrated – "not because people told [her] or people wanted [her] to" but because she "wanted to". She also discussed that it was during the production of Unexpected that she was introduced to and began experimenting with different "sound effects" and elements of electronic music.

== Release and promotion ==
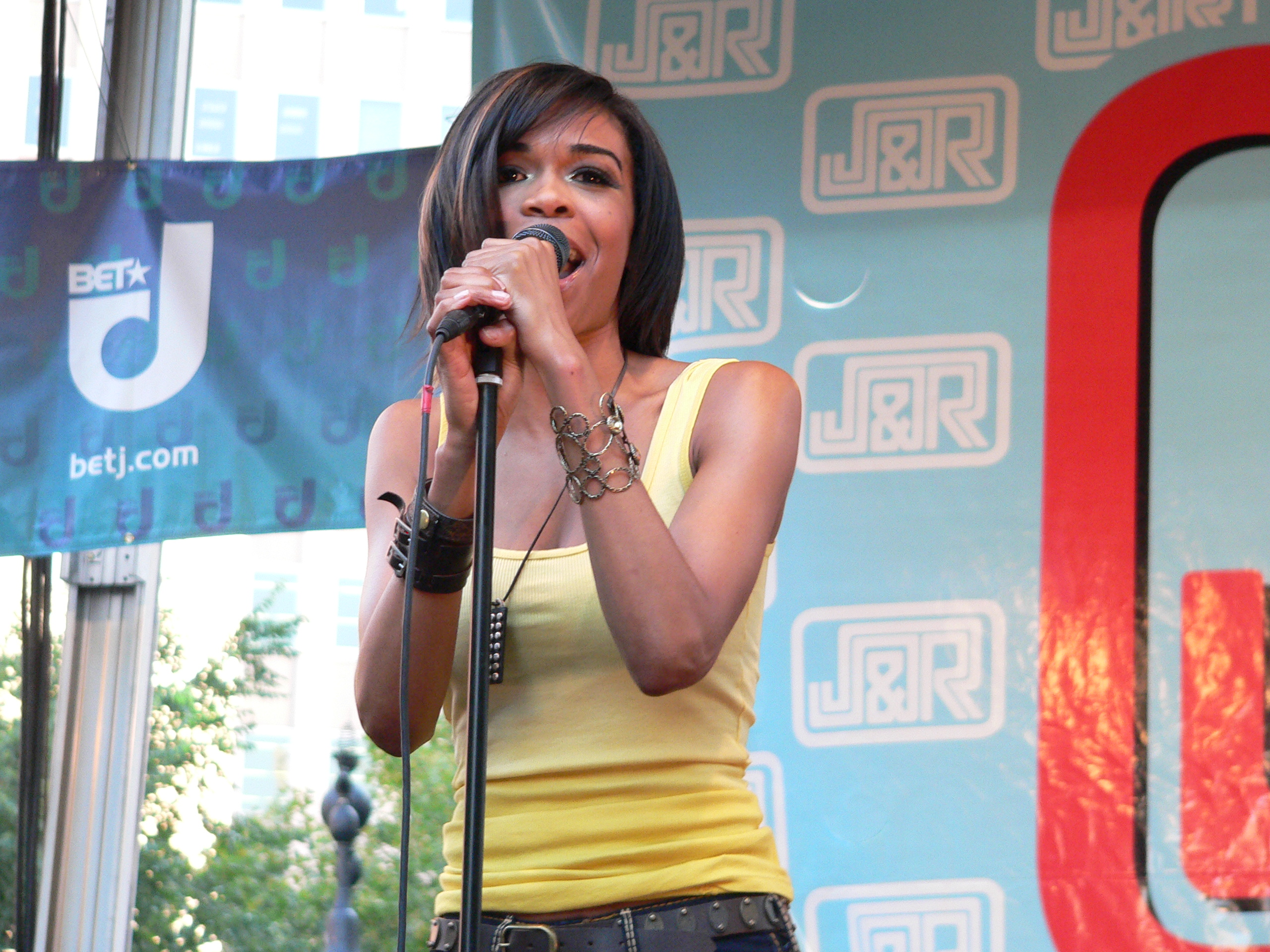
Williams performing on stage at the J&R Musicfest at City Hall Park in New York City in 2008.

The album's release date was first announced to be August 12, 2008, but was unexpectedly changed to October 7, 2008, to allow more time to promote the album. Prior to the album's release, Williams performed on The Wendy Williams Show, The Early Show and appeared on Good Day LA, Total Request Live and in the UK, on Loose Women to promote.

Three singles were released in support of Unexpected. "We Break the Dawn", the album's lead single, was written by Solange Knowles and Wayne Wilkins and Andrew Frampton who produced the song. Released on April 15, 2008, in the United States, it peaked at number one on the Billboard Hot Dance Airplay chart, number four on the Billboard Hot Dance Club Play chart and twenty-six on the Global Dance Tracks chart. The song became her first solo release to chart internationally, peaking at number forty-seven on the UK Singles Chart and number thirty-eight on the Hungarian Radio Top 40. A music video for the song, directed by Phil Griffin, was shot on April 23 in Los Angeles, California, premiering on May 20, 2008. The remix version of the song was produced by DJ Montay and features Flo Rida.

"The Greatest", produced by Jim Jonsin, was released as the album's second single, replacing "Stop This Car" which was originally announced as the second single. The song was released on September 9, 2008, gaining more recognition after being used in the movie Noah's Arc: Jumping The Broom. Despite receiving minor airplay in the US, in September 2008, "The Greatest" was released digitally and debuted at number fifty-four on the US Billboard Hot Dance Club Play chart before eventually peaking at number one. The music video was shot on September 22 in Los Angeles, California and was directed by Thomas Kloss. The song was listed by Billboard at number thirty-nine on the decade-end (2000–2009) Hot Dance Club Songs chart. "Hello Heartbreak", was selected as the album's third single and second UK single. Produced by Alex Da Kid and Jay Wes, the single received minor airplay and was released digitally in December 2008. The song peaked at number eight on the US Billboard Dance Singles Sales chart, and number forty on the Billboard Hot Singles Sales chart.

== Critical reception ==
Professional ratings
Aggregate scores
Source	Rating
Metacritic	67/100
Review scores
Source	Rating
About.com	3.5/5 stars
AllMusic	3/5 stars
Artistdirect	3/5 stars
Cross Rhythms	8/10 squares
Entertainment Weekly	B+
IOL	3/5 stars
Slant Magazine	3/5 stars
USA Today	1/4 stars

Unexpected received positive reviews. At Metacritic, which assigns a rated mean out of 100 from mainstream critics, the album received a score of 67, which indicates "generally favorable reviews". In his review for About.com, Ben Norman wrote that "with the release of Unexpected, Williams has welcomed R&B back into her arms with a modern edge, a la Rihanna and Chris Brown, infusing her soulful lyrics with party beats and dance-like synths [...] this album fits nicely into a lot of musical niches, making it a good addition to most collections. And you may be humming some of these tracks years down the line. Not my favorite of the year, but not too shabby either." Mikael Wood of Billboard found that "Williams and her handlers have clearly been listening to recent hits by Rihanna and Ciara. That said, Unexpected does boast a handful of shiny electro-R&B gems that make Williams' journey from church to club as enjoyable as it was inevitable." Similarly, Blues & Soul reviewer Pete Lewis noted that "many of the album's synth-heavy uptempo cuts rely heavily on the kind of Euro-dance-inspired electronica utilised recently by fellow US urbanites like Timbaland and Justin Timberlake."

Entertainment Weekly editor Josette Compton wrote that Unexpected "pumps with technodriven tracks like "Hello Heartbreak" (which is reminiscent of Kylie Minogue) and made-for-radio cuts like the lead off single, "We Break the Dawn." Although the album's effervescent club feel tapers off near the end, when the songs grow formulaic, the album's charm could still give Michelle Williams a shot at the charts." Robin Carolan of Slant Magazine called the Unexpected a "fairly decent album and by far the least pretentious, unashamedly pop record to be made by a Destiny's Child member so far." She noted that Williams had "stepped outside of the confines of the church and into the dark of the clubs, embracing au courant euro-pop sounds, and it's a move that works well for her." Andy Cooper, writing for Cross Rhythms, felt that "though the production quality is undoubtedly extremely high, the lyrical focus will be a big disappointment to anyone looking for some gospel inspiration. The teen girl audience would appear to be the target once again, and much digital trickery has been brought into play to help Michelle sound (and look) younger. It's a great R&B pop record musically, but with songs such as "Lucky Girl" and "Hungover" it's unexpectedly shallow." Vibe magazine declared Unexpected "natural, pleasant and brutally honest, opening the eyes of those who slept on Williams' skills."

== Commercial performance ==
In October 2008, Unexpected debuted on the US Billboard 200 albums chart at number forty-two – achieving greater success on Billboard's component charts (as with her previous albums Heart To Yours and Do You Know) where the album peaked at number eleven on the Top R&B/Hip-Hop Albums chart and number forty-two on the Digital Albums chart, with first week sales of 14,618 in the United States. The album peaked within the top 40 of the UK R&B Albums Chart at number 38 whilst the single, "We Break The Dawn", peaked within the top 50 of the UK Singles Chart. As of April 2013, the album has sold 34,000 copies in the United States.

In January 2009, Williams confirmed in a video blog that she and a production team were putting the finishing touches for a remix version of the album due for release in North America and Asia going on to later state in June 2009 via Twitter that Unexpected would receive a full UK re-release and that "Hello Heartbreak" would be the first single set for release in August 2009. Williams also confirmed in July 2009 that the London division of Sony Music was considering a re-issue of the album which created the opportunity to record some new songs. Furthermore, she revealed that the new remix album was almost complete and puts a hip hop and/or jazz spin on some the original album's tracks. She also said that some of the new remixes could also be released as part of the UK re-issue. However, by the end of 2009, no further confirmation or news concerning the remix album or UK re-release was provided and therefore it is most likely that the ideas were scrapped.

== Track listing ==
Unexpected track listing
No.	Title	Writer(s)	Producer(s)	Length
1.	"Unexpected" (Intro)		Raymond "Shonny B" Hilton	0:44
2.	"Hello Heartbreak"	Rico Love; James Scheffer	Jim Jonsin; Love^{[a]}	4:07
3.	"We Break the Dawn"	Solange Knowles; Andrew Frampton; Wayne Wilkins	Wilkins; Frampton	3:54
4.	"Lucky Girl Interlude"/"Lucky Girl"	Love; Alain Biamby; Joel Augustin	Love; Jackpot; Erron Williams; Love^{[a]}; Chad "C-Note" Roper^{[a]}	3:51
5.	"The Greatest"	Love; Scheffer	Jonsin; Love^{[a]}	3:31
6.	"Till the End of the World"	Love; John Ho; Vyente Ruffin	Love; Royal XVI^{[b]}; Love^{[a]}	3:10
7.	"Private Party"	Love; Dwayne "Dtown" Nesmith	Love; Nesmith; Love^{[a]}	3:35
8.	"Hungover"	Keli Nicole Price; Jazz Nixon	Nixon	3:31
9.	"We Break the Dawn (Part 2)" (featuring Flo Rida)	Knowles; Frampton; Wilkins; Tramar Dillard	DJ Montay	4:21
10.	"Stop This Car"	Makeba Riddick; Mikkel S. Ericksen; Tor Erik Hermansen	StarGate	3:58
11.	"Unexpected"	Love; Frampton; Wilkins	Wilkins; Frampton; Love^{[a]}	3:37
12.	"Thank U"	Jack Kugell; Jason Pennock; Jamie Jones; D'Myreo Mitchell; Treasure Davis	Kugell; Jones; Pennock; REO	3:45
13.	"Too Young for Love"	Love; Earl Hood; Eric Goudy	Love; EHOOD & E2^{[b]}; Love^{[a]}; Roper^{[a]}	3:56
Total length:				46:00

FYE bonus track
No.	Title	Writer(s)	Producer(s)	Length
14.	"Sick of It"	Carsten Schack; Kenneth Karlin; Atozzio Towns	Soulshock & Karlin; Towns^{[b]}	3:53
Total length:				49:53

iTunes Store and Amazon MP3 edition bonus content
No.	Title	Writer(s)	Producer(s)	Length
14.	"Hello Heartbreak" (Matty's Body and Soul Mix)	Love; Scheffer	Jonsin; Matthias "Matty Heilbronn^{[c]}	8:38
15.	"We Break the Dawn" (music video)	Knowles; Frampton; Wilkins	Alex da Kid; Jay Wes	3:51
Total length:				58:29

Digital edition bonus track
No.	Title	Writer(s)	Producer(s)	Length
14.	"We Break the Dawn" (Karmatronic Radio Remix Edit)	Knowles; Frampton; Wilkins	Wilkins; Frampton; Karmatronic^{[c]}	2:54
Total length:				48:54

International digital edition bonus track
No.	Title	Writer(s)	Producer(s)	Length
15.	"Hello Heartbreak" (Matty's Body and Soul Mix)	Love; Scheffer	Jonsin; Heilbronn^{[c]}	8:38
Total length:				57:32

Notes

- ^{^[a]} signifies vocal producer(s)
- ^{^[b]} signifies co-producer(s)
- ^{^[c]} signifies additional producer(s)

== Personnel ==
Credits are taken from the album's liner notes.

Performers

- Lead vocals – Michelle Williams
- Guest vocals – Flo Rida
- Backing vocals – Michelle Williams, Keli Nicole Price, LeChe D. Martin, Rico Love, Ravaughn Brown, Branden Burns, Treasure Dais

Musicians

- Bass guitar – Ethan Farmer, Frank Romano
- Guitar – Frank Romano
- Other instrumentation – Soulshock & Karlin, Jazz Nixon, Wayne Wilkins

Technical and production

- Arrangers – Jack Kugell, James "Famous" Jones, James Scheffer, Jason Pennock, Michelle Williams, Solange Knowles, Soulshock & Karlin
- Engineering – Andrew Frampton, Dan Naim, Dave Lopez, Jazz Nixon, Joe Gonzalez, Mikkel S. Ericksen, Wayne Wilkins
- Engineering assistants – Christian Plata
- Mastering – Chris Gehringer
- Mixing – Dan Naim, Jean-Marie Horvat, Josh Butler, Manny Marroquin, Phil Tan, Wayne Wilkins
- Mixing assistants – Josh Houghkirk
- Music producers – Alex Da Kid, Andrew Frampton, DJ Montay, Dwane "Dtown" Smith, EHOOD & E2, Erron Williams, Jack Kugell, James "Famous" Jones, Jason Pennock and The Heavyweights, Jay Wes, Jazz Nixon, Jim Jonsin, John Q. Ho (for Royal XVI), Raymond "Shonny B" Hilton, Stargate, Soulshock & Karlin, Vyente Ruffin, Wayne Wilkins
- Programming – Andrew Frampton, Jason Pennock, Wayne Wilkins
- Vocal production – Rico Love

== Charts ==
Weekly chart performance for Unexpected
Chart (2008)	Peak position
Japanese Albums (Oricon)	115
UK R&B Albums (Official Charts)	38
US Billboard 200	42
US Top R&B/Hip-Hop Albums (Billboard)	11

== Release history ==
Unexpected release history
Region	Date	Label	Ref(s)
Japan	August 12, 2008	Sony BMG	
Chile	September 26, 2008	Sony BMG	
United Kingdom	September 29, 2008	Sony BMG	
Poland	September 30, 2008	Sony BMG	
United States	October 7, 2008	Columbia	
Europe	December 5, 2008	Sony BMG	
