= IMx discography =

This is the discography of R&B and soul trio IMx.

== Albums ==
=== Studio albums ===
List of studio albums, with selected chart positions, sales figures and certifications
Title	Album details	Peak chart positions		Certifications
Title	Album details	US	US R&B	Certifications
On Our Worst Behavior	Released: September 22, 1992; Label: Virgin; Formats: CD, cassette	—	—	
Playtyme Is Over	Released: August 2, 1994; Label: MCA; Formats: CD, cassette, digital download	88	26	RIAA: Gold
We Got It	Released: December 5, 1995; Label: MCA; Formats: CD, cassette, digital download	76	14	RIAA: Gold
The Journey	Released: September 23, 1997; Label: MCA; Formats: CD, cassette, digital download	92	20	
Introducing IMx	Released: October 26, 1999; Label: MCA; Formats: CD, cassette, digital download, LP	101	31	
IMx	Released: August 21, 2001; Label: TUG, New Line; Formats: CD, cassette, digital download	126	26	

=== Compilation albums ===
Title	Album details
Greatest Hits	Released: February 27, 2001; Label: Hip-O, Universal; Formats: CD, digital download

== Singles ==
Year	Title	Peak charts				Certifications	Album
Year	Title	US	US R&B	AUS	UK	Certifications	Album
1992	"Tear It Up (On Our Worst Behavior)"	—	29	—	—		On Our Worst Behavior
1994	"Never Lie"	5	5	55	—	RIAA: Gold	Playtyme Is Over
1994	"Constantly"	16	12	—	—	RIAA: Gold	Playtyme Is Over
1995	"I Don't Mind"	92	47	—	—		Playtyme Is Over
1995	"Feel the Funk"	46	15	—	—		We Got It // Dangerous Minds OST
1996	"We Got It"	37	11	—	26		We Got It
1996	"Please Don't Go"	36	16	—	—		We Got It
1996	"Lover's Groove"	101	42	—	—		We Got It
1996	"Watch Me Do My Thing" (featuring Smooth and Kel Mitchell as Ed from Good Burger)	32	16	—	—		All That OST
1997	"I'm Not a Fool"	69	19	—	—		The Journey
1997	"Give Up the Ghost"	—	—	—	—		The Journey
1997	"Extra, Extra"	—	—	—	—		The Journey
1999	"Stay the Night"	23	20	—	—	RIAA: Gold	Introducing IMx
2000	"In & Out Of Love"	—	50	—	—		Introducing IMx
2001	"First Time"	—	69	—	—		IMx
2001	"Clap Your Hands Pt. 2"	—	—	—	—		IMx
2001	"Beautiful (You Are)"	—	71	—	—		IMx
2014	"Let Me Find Out"	—	—	—	—		Forever
2014	"Own It"	—	—	—	—		Forever
