= Jerome Jones =

American rapper and singer

- Born: Jerome Isaac Jones; October 25, 1981 (age 45); Long Beach, California, U.S.
- Genres: Hip hop; pop rap; R&B
- Occupations: Rapper; singer; songwriter; actor
- Years active: 1990–2002 (Immature/IMx); 2004–present (solo); 1993–present (actor)
- Labels: TUG Entertainment; Universal
- Member of: Immature

Jerome Isaac Jones (born October 25, 1981), known professionally as Romeo and Young Rome, is an American rapper and singer. He is a member of R&B group Immature/IMx. Jones released his solo debut album Food for Thought in 2004.

== Career ==
Jones is a founding member of R&B group Immature/IMx, which included Marques "Batman" Houston and Kelton "LDB" Kessee and was managed by Chris Stokes. The group released four albums under the name Immature: On Our Worst Behavior (1992), Playtyme Is Over (1994), We Got It (1995) and The Journey (1997). Jones' nickname at this time was "Romeo". In 1999, the group underwent a name change and released two albums under the name IMx: Introducing IMx (1999) and IMx (2001). The group also branched out into film (House Party 4: Down to the Last Minute) and television (A Different World) before disbanding in 2002.

In 2004, Jones began pursuing a solo career. Under the name Young Rome, he released his debut album titled Food for Thought on June 22. The album featured the singles "After Party" (featuring former B2K member Omarion) and "Freaky" (featuring rapper Guerilla Black).

== Eye condition ==
Throughout most of his career with Immature/IMX, Jones wore an eye patch over his right eye, leading to speculation that Jones had an eye condition. However, Jones later clarified the situation in a verse from his song "Look Down On Me", featured on his debut album Food For Thought:

I remember when Brandy Norwood hit me in my eye. I had a detached retina (and) my lens came out, I had to have three eye surgeries. And she thought we'd never be cool again. But I put that on my life, I love her to death. If she hear me talking, I know she can hear the honesty in my voice and my sincerity.

Jones has stated that he was hit in the eye with a book. In her 2026 autobiography, Phases, Brandy revealed that she threw the book out of anger because another group member had sexually assaulted her.

== Discography ==
=== Albums ===
Year	Albums
2004	Food for Thought
2006	Round 1

=== Singles ===
Year	Title	Album
2004	"After Party" (featuring Omarion) & Marques Houston	Food for Thought
2004	"Freaky" (featuring Guerilla Black)	Food for Thought
2005	"For Your Love" (featuring Marques Houston)	Round 1
2006	"Silly of Me" (featuring Needa S.)	Round 1
2009	"Love You More" (featuring Omarion)	TBA

== Filmography ==
=== Television ===
Year	Title	Role
1993	A Different World	Crayton Adams
1996	Family Matters	Himself
1996	The Parent 'Hood	Himself
1997	Sister, Sister	Himself

=== Film ===
Year	Film	Role
1994	House Party 3	Jerome
2001	House Party 4: Down to the Last Minute	Mark
2004	You Got Served	Sonny
2007	Feel the Noise	Himself
