= Greatest Hits (IMx album) =

Compilation album by IMx

Greatest Hits (Immature & IMx album)

Greatest hits album by Immature/IMx
- Released: February 27, 2001
- Recorded: 1991–1999
- Genre: R&B
- Label: Fontana Hip-O

Immature/IMx chronology
Introducing IMx (1999)	Greatest Hits (Immature & IMx album) (2001)	IMx (2001)

Greatest Hits is a collection of IMx's hit songs released in 2001.

== Track listing ==
1. "Never Lie" (Radio Version)
2. "We Got It" (Radio Mix)
3. "Constantly"
4. "Extra, Extra"
5. "In & Out of Love" (Radio Edit)
6. "Please Don't Go" (Radio Edit)
7. "Stay the Night" (Radio Edit)
8. "Lover's Groove"
9. "Is It Me?" (feat. Monteco)
10. "I'm Not a Fool" (Radio Edit)
11. "I Don't Mind"
12. "Give Up the Ghost"
13. "Watch Me Do My Thing"
14. "Da Munchies"
15. "Tear It Up (On Our Worst Behavior)"
16. "Keep It on the Low"
17. "Feel the Funk"
18. "We Got It" (DJ Jam Remix Edit)
19. "Never Lie" (Padapella Mix)
