= All That: The Album =

Soundtrack album by Various Artists
- Released: November 26, 1996
- Recorded: 1994–1996
- Genres: Hip hop, R&B
- Length: 41:00
- Labels: Loud, RCA
- Producer: Tracy Sullivan

Professional ratings
Review scores
Source	Rating
AllMusic	3/5 stars

All That: The Album is the soundtrack of musical performances and sketch clips from the hit Nickelodeon television series All That. It was released by Loud Records and RCA Records on November 26, 1996.

== Track listing ==
1. "5 Minutes" (All That Dialogue) 0:14
2. TLC - All That Theme Song 1:04
3. "Good Burger/Good Weenie" (All That Dialogue) 0:26
4. Immature featuring Smooth and Kel Mitchell as Ed from Good Burger - "Watch Me Do My Thing" 3:50
5. Superdude (All That Dialogue) 0:24
6. Brandy - "Baby" 5:12
7. "Ed & Coolio" (All That Dialogue) 0:32
8. Coolio - "Fantastic Voyage" 4:01
9. "Vital Information" I (All That Dialogue) 0:09
10. Mokenstef - "He's Mine" 4:13
11. "Miss Fingerly V. Bacteria" (All That Dialogue) 0:18
12. Soul For Real - "Candy Rain" 4:28
13. "Coach Kreeton" (All That Dialogue) 0:08
14. Aaliyah - "Age Ain't Nothing but a Number" 4:11
15. "Loud Librarian" (All That Dialogue) 0:33
16. Naughty By Nature - "Clap Yo Hands" 3:58
17. "Earboy & Pizza Face" (All That Dialogue) 0:32
18. Faith Evans - "You Used to Love Me" 4:28
19. "Vital Information II" (All That Dialogue) 0:06
20. Immature - "We Got It" 2:51
21. TLC - "All That" - Outro Theme Song 1:13

== Dialogues ==
The album was created and recorded in 1994–1996. The songs were from musical guests in season 1 (1994-1995) through season 2 (1995-1996). The dialogues were directly from All That sketches like Good Burger/Good Weenie, Vital Information, and Superdude. This CD was not released until a week after the premiere of season 3, so Amanda Bynes is not on the album, nor is Angelique Bates, due to her small number of characters in the show, but she was heard briefly in the "Miss Fingerly v. Bacteria" dialogue.

The subsequent Nickelodeon series iCarly's soundtrack album released contained dialogue like All That: The Album, but they were recorded to recap certain episodes from the first season. The Drake & Josh soundtrack and Zoey 101: Music Mix did not contain any dialogues from their releases.

== See also ==
- All That
