= IMX =

IMX may refer to:

- IMX (TV series), or Interactive Music Exchange, an American music television program from 2003 to 2004
- IMx, an American R&B group, also known as Immature
  - IMx (album), 2001 album
- i.MX, a family of Freescale Semiconductor (now part of NXP) proprietary microprocessors
- IMX Resources, a dual-listed iron ore mining and base and precious metals exploration company based in Perth, Western Australia
- IMX-101, a high-performance insensitive explosive
- MPEG IMX, a digital video format for Betacam
- Zimex Aviation, an airline based in Glattbrugg, Switzerland, by ICAO code
