= Concore Entertainment =

American record label

- Founded: 1998
- Founder: Charve The Don
- Distributor: Sony Music
- Genre: pop, rap
- Country of origin: United States
- Location: Los Angeles, California
- Official website: www.concoreentertainment.com

Concore Entertainment is an American record label based in Los Angeles, California. Concore Entertainment was founded in 1998 by Charve Norris Aka Charve The Don, known for producing Freddie Jackson on the album Here It Is, Immature on the album On Our Worst Behavior, Sweetest Love from the album Playtyme Is Over and Cherish. The company is home to a diverse roster of recording artists, musicians such as Tito Jackson from The Jackson 5 and brother of Michael Jackson. Producer Steve Russell from the platinum selling group Troop 3x Grammy winner producing and writing for Chris Brown, Kelly Clarkson, Jordin Sparks, B2K, Ciara, Jennifer Hudson, Charlie Wilson and more. Concore Entertainment also launched the career of Brazilian international star Natalia Damini who has had #1 songs on Billboard Emerging Artist Chart and #9 on Billboard Trending 140 and #15 on Billboard Next Big Sound and Natalia was also #1 on DRT (Digital Radio Tracking Charts) and #1 on Spotify Top 25.

== History ==
Concore Entertainment CEO Charve The Don started out as an artist, advanced to a producer, then manager and eventually, an executive. He scored his first record deal at 15 years old with Macola Records, whose roster included NWA, Eazy E, Dr. Dre, Ice Cube. 2 Live Crew, Timex Social Club. At 16 Charve was signed with CBS Records which is Sony and from there he started producing major recording artist such as Immature, Freddie Jackson and Cherish. In 2018, Concore Entertainment partnered up with M-TP Entertainment, home of Son Tung M-TP, linked up with Snoop Dogg to be featured on Son Tung's M-TP single and video Hay Trao Cho Anh and Madison Beer who is starring the music video. In 2019 Concore Entertainment signs a global distribution deal with Sony Music, and signed Marc Nelson, original founder of Boyz II Men and lead singer of Az Yet and also signed Reuben Cannon, younger brother of Nick Cannon. In 2020 Concore partner with Vietnamese movie company TNA Entertainment and release the first single from the "She-Kings" animation movie that charted on Billboard #21 Hot Adult Contemporary. Concore Entertainment released Natalia Damini's Pacemaker featuring Petey Pablo and it was the 10th most added song on Top 40 radio, reached Top 50 on Mediabase All Published Chart and peak #31 on Billboard Mainstream Top 40 Indicator Chart.

== Artists ==
- Natalia Damini
- Steve Russell from Troop (band)
- Tito Jackson
- Reuben Cannon
- Mai Phuong
- Petey Pablo
- E'Javien
- Marc Nelson
- Young Hitta
- The Shop Boyz
- Rich Lowe
- Peso Benjies
- Tony Grant
- Shifty Eyes
- John Preston
- Sơn Tùng M-TP
- Davey Star
- D.Collins

== See also ==
- List of record labels
