= Jonezen =

American rapper

- Born: Christopher Richard Jones; Detroit, Michigan, U.S.
- Origin: Los Angeles, California
- Genres: Hip hop
- Occupations: Rapper, songwriter, actor, guitarist
- Years active: 2012–present
- Website: www.jonezenmusic.com

Christopher Richard Jones better known by his stage name Jonezen, is an American rapper, songwriter, actor and guitarist. Born in Detroit, Michigan, he now resides in Los Angeles, CA.

== Career ==
Jonezen started his career in 2005 with the rap group Outta Control until 2011 then he left the group starting a solo career and recorded his first mixtape Live From Rehab. Jonezen signed by Charve The Don to Concore Entertainment in 2014.

Jonezen received coverage in The Source Magazine, AllHipHop.com who asked Jonezen “is he the next Eminem? Or Can Jonezen be the next Eminem?” winning 2013 Los Angeles Music Awards for Hip Hop Artist of the year and winning 2014 Los Angeles Music Awards for Hip Hop Artist and Solo Performer of the Year, and his single "Tear The Club Up ft. Natalia Damini & Gucci Mane" has been added on Sirius XM Hip Hop Nation. Jonezen was booked for the Monster Energy/Soundrink presented "Get Loud" tour with Bone Thugs N' Harmony and hit the road in November 2014. He also has toured California multiple times, performed at the 2013 South By Southwest music festival, booked at the 2014 South By Southwest Music Fest, licensed songs for use in TV and film, had a small role performing his original material in the new Jamie Kennedy film Buddy Hutchins, been a featured guest on the Janice Dickinson talk show, and participated in the P.A.C.E. school tour. In 2015 Jonezen released the mixtape The Party Ain't Over.

== Discography ==
Year	Song
2011	Pep Talk - Album

== Singles ==
Year	Song
2012	Buried By Six
2014	Bombs Away
2014	Tear The Club Up feat. Gucci Mane, Natalia Damini

== Tours ==
- 2014 - "Get Loud Tour" Bone Thugs-n-Harmony

== Music videos ==
Year	Song
2013	Feels So Good feat. Michele Wylen
2014	Peep Game
2014	Bombs Away feat. D'Meetri
2014	Tear The Club Up feat. Gucci Mane, Natalia Damini

== Awards ==
=== Underground Music Awards ===
2015

- #1 Contender

=== Los Angeles Music Awards ===
2013

- Hip Hop Artist Of The Year

2014

- Hip Hop Artist Of The Year
- Solo Performer
