= All That season 2 =

All That
- Season 2
- Starring: Angelique Bates; Lori Beth Denberg; Katrina Johnson; Kel Mitchell; Alisa Reyes; Josh Server; Kenan Thompson
- No. of episodes: 21

Release
- Original network: Nickelodeon
- Original release: October 7, 1995 – October 26, 1996

Season chronology
- ← Previous; Season 1 Next → Season 3

All That's second season ran from October 7, 1995, to March 30, 1996. This season contained 21 episodes, as well as Good Burger special episode.

This season is similar to season one, starring the same cast members, having the same intro, and still being taped in Orlando, Florida. Following the conclusion of production on the third season the show moved out of Florida and moved to Nickelodeon on Sunset (formerly The Aquarius Theater) in Hollywood, California. Season 2 is also the final season for Angelique Bates, whose contract with the show was not renewed.

The producers thought that Mitchell and Thompson had good chemistry on the series together, and so from there, the duo would begin starring on their own show, Kenan & Kel. The show debuted shortly after this season ended, with Mitchell and Thompson performing on both shows and doing other promotional work with the network.

== Cast ==
Repertory players

- Angelique Bates
- Lori Beth Denberg (Note: Vital Information anchor)
- Katrina Johnson
- Kel Mitchell
- Alisa Reyes
- Josh Server
- Kenan Thompson

== Episodes ==
| No. overall | No. in season | Title | Original release date | Prod. code | U.S. households (in millions) |
|---|---|---|---|---|---|
| 16 | 1 | "Naughty by Nature" | October 7, 1995 | 216 | N/A |
Green Room-Auditions: The cast takes a look at some All That audition footage.; Good Burger Commercial: Good Burger is filming its first-ever TV commercial. The manager tries to keep Ed from coming to work, but he shows up anyway and knocks out the actor Marty (Josh) in the commercial. Now Ed has to take his place. He quickly makes a horrible mess of things as usual.; Vital Information; Loud Librarian (debut): Nobody had better make a peep in Ms. Hushbaum's (Lori Beth) library. She'll scream at anyone who makes even the tiniest sound. Unfortunately for the students, though, Ms. Hushbaum is very strict but she is also a hypocrite--she vacuums while singing "America, the Beautiful", bangs a gong, turns up the volume while watching TV, bowls, and revs up a motorcycle in the library.; Cooking with Randy & Mandy: Apparently, all the chocolate consumed by Randy gives him a bad toothache. Mandy tries to do what she can to make it better. A passing dentist drops by and offers to extract the problem tooth--but his next availability is in eleven weeks, and Randy can't imagine going without chocolate for that long. Mandy then assists him in ripping the tooth out right then and there.; Loud Librarian introduces Musical Guest: Naughty by Nature – "Clap Yo Hands"
| 17 | 2 | "Monica" | October 7, 1995 | 217 | N/A |
Green Room-Cast Directors: The cast members pretend to be the director in order to trick Kevin into doing embarrassing things, such as drinking a bottle of hot sauce with no water, smacking his own face, and going into the Tiger Room.; Ishboo celebrates his birthday in unusual ways.; Vital Information w/Lori Beth Denberg; Island Girls: Fran (Lori Beth) and Kiki (Alisa) are stuck on a deserted island. Fran wants to get off the island but has to put up with the stupidity of Kiki. Therefore, they are unsuccessful.; Everyday French w/ Pierre Escargot; Detective Dan: The jewelry of Mrs. Lipschitz (Lori Beth) is stolen--but don't worry, because it's Detective Dan to the rescue! Unfortunately, the incompetent Dan ruins the case by allowing the obviously-guilty butler, Charles (guest star Douglas Brush [1921-2004]), to escape.; Vital Information: Monica seems to have taken over the Vital Information desk. But then, Lori Beth eventually shows up and dismisses her, telling her that she will have to sing a song as punishment for the coup.; Vital Information introduces Musical Guest: Monica – "Don't Take It Personal (Just One of Dem Days)"
| 18 | 3 | "Larisa Oleynik/Da Brat" | October 14, 1995 | 218 | 1.99 |
Green Room-Spin the Bottle: The kids play a game of spin the bottle. However, instead of the bottle landing on a person, it lands on objects. The cast kisses such items as a chair, a cactus, and their octopus!; A cat named Mittens is stuck in a tree. She belongs to a little girl named Amy (Katrina), and Coach Kreeton tries to help. One of his attempts, unfortunately, is thwarted by Amy's friend Tommy (Josh) and the latter's bow and arrow.; Vital Information w/Lori Beth Denberg; Miss Fingerly in "The Cheater": Ms. Fingerly gives her students a test. One student named Hilary (Katrina) tries to cheat, but Miss Fingerly stops her. The student proceeds to go to any lengths necessary to cheat.; Everyday French With Pierre Escargot; All That makes fun of its own channel with "The Secret World of Alex Sax", a parody of The Secret World of Alex Mack.; Special Guest: Larisa Oleynik: Vital Information With Lori Beth Denberg; Ishboo & Da Brat play a game of Sponge Toss.; Ishboo introduces Musical Guest: Da Brat – "Give It 2 You"
| 19 | 4 | "Malcolm-Jamal Warner/Mokenstef" | October 21, 1995 | 219 | N/A |
Green Room-The Fight: Kel & Alisa had a fight and aren't speaking to each other. They manage to make up over their shared love--playing cruel pranks on Kevin.; Superdude has another showdown with Milkman at an ice cream parlor. Milkman introduces his new weapon; The Ice Cream Catapult.; Vital Information w/Lori Beth Denberg; Miss Fingerly: Two students, Bradley and Robert (Josh and Kel), compete to see who is the best teacher's pet; e.g. Bradley brings Miss Fingerly a Macintosh apple, while Robert brings her a potted apple tree that grows red delicious apples.; Everyday French With Pierre Escargot; Repairman (Kel) makes people's life harder as he "repairs" things.; Mavis & Clavis Meet Special Guest:(Director) Malcolm-Jamal Warner; Mavis & Clavis introduce Musical Guest: Mokenstef – "He's Mine (Remix)"
| 20 | 5 | "Jon B." | November 4, 1995 | 220 | N/A |
Green Room-Josh's Nightmare: Josh has a nightmare before the show that he was performing live in underwear...but this is only a dream.; Good Bug-ger: Ed brings his insect collection into work. It doesn't take long for him to break the glass cage and send the insects everywhere in the store, terrifying customers and staff members alike.; Vital Information w/Lori Beth Denberg; Goof-Offs (Kel and Alisa) have been goofing off in class during career day when they must present their life career.; Loud Librarian: Ms. Hushbaum demands that everyone be quiet in her library, even as she cracks her knuckles and face, chomps on potato chips loudly, screams into the telephone, uses a blender and sips her drink noisily, plays the drums, and uses a jackhammer.; Vital Information w/Lori Beth Denberg; Mavis & Clavis meet Jon B.; Mavis & Clavis introduce Musical Guest: Jon B. – "Pretty Girl"
| 21 | 6 | "The Twinz" | November 11, 1995 | 221 | N/A |
Green Room-The Missing Audience: Something strange is going on on the All That set. Every audience member has vanished into thin air! The mystery is solved when Katrina reveals that she took them all for a swim.; Baggin' Saggin' Barry meets competition in Baggin' Saggin' Mary. She seems to have even more stuff in her pants than he has in his, and he feels discouraged. Clavis advises him to "reach down deep in his pants and pull out things he never knew he had", and Barry's confidence is restored. He defeats Mary in a second duel, by pulling former president Abraham Lincoln (guest star Greg Neff, who also appeared in "The Cheater" in Episode 3), and Barry and Mary eventually marry to start a family. They have three children--Jerry, Sherry, and Gary.; Vital Information w/Lori Beth Denberg; Earboy: Earboy and his friends continue their quest to become popular by selling "Pork on a Stick."; Island Girls vs. Pirates; Island Girls introduce Musical Guest: The Twinz "Round & Round"
| 22 | 7 | "Monteco" | November 18, 1995 | 222 | N/A |
Green Room: Kel's Sleeping Legs; The Okrah Show: Okrah Winfrey (Kel) talks about "Kids out of Control" on her show. Unfortunately, the kids (Josh, Kenan, and Alisa) actually come to the set and start attacking her. This sketch also introduces Katrina as Roseanne Barr.; Vital Information w/ Lori Beth Denberg (w/ Katrina Johnson); More "repairwork" by Repairman during a Bacteria concert.; Everyday French w/ Pierre Escargot; If people have a problem with a product from a mall, they are sent to the Complaint Department. But the customers will be complaining more than ever when they visit, because the Complaint Department Lady (Lori Beth) is pretty crazy. She treats a hat like a dog and tries to put a dog on her head!; Pierre Escargot introduces Musical guest: Monteco – "Down to the Bone"
| 23 | 8 | "Soul 4 Real" | December 2, 1995 | 223 | 2.18 |
Green Room-Fan Mail: The cast takes a look at some All That fan mail. A guy even mails himself to the cast.; Arnie (Josh) invites Ishboo to a sleepover, but Ishboo ends up alarming his family with his outrageous foreign ways of doing things. An example of this is how Ishboo brings with him a vending machine that contains six different types of soft drink--for instance, Mountain Whiz, which comes from goats--from his foreign land.; Vital Information w/Lori Beth Denberg; Lil' Pansy: Bernie and his wife (Kel and Angelique) try to enjoy a romantic date at home. But unfortunately, a Lil' Pansy Scout named Susie (Katrina) arrives, trying to get them to buy her cookies (e.g. Lulu creams and fat mamas). And this scout will do whatever it takes to make a sale!; Everyday French w/Pierre Escargot; Loud Librarian: Kids can always study in Ms. Hushbaum's library, because it's so quiet. No one is allowed to make noise. Ms. Hushbaum enforces this rule while she staples a book, tries to kill a fly, yells at a baby, does karate, and leads a marching band into the library.; Peter and Flem; Mavis & Clavis hangs with Soul IV Real in the Green Room; Mavis & Clavis introduce Musical Guest: Soul IV Real – "If You Want It"
| 24 | 9 | "Subway" | December 9, 1995 | 224 | N/A |
Green Room-The Ice Water Contest: Kenan, Kel, and Lori Beth have a contest to see who can keep their hands in a bucket of ice water the longest.; Good Burger: Aliens (Josh and Katrina) from the Kopelow Galaxy invade Good Burger; Vital Information w/Lori Beth Denberg; Show & Tell; Everyday French with Pierre Escargot; Dr. K meets Roseanne Barr as she comes on his show to give advice to parents.; Peter & Flem; Roseanne Barr introduces Musical Guest: Subway – "Get Da Money"
| 25 | 10 | "Run DMC" | December 23, 1995 | 225 | 2.31 |
Green Room-Meet Santa: The kids meet Santa and request some odd presents for Christmas.; Holiday Cooking With Randy & Mandy: Randy and Mandy show viewers some delicious chocolatey recipes for the holiday season. There's a turkey stuffed and basted with chocolate, some choco-motzah ball soup with chocolate balls and broth, and the Super Special Chocolate Milkshake, which is for any day!; Holiday Vital Information w/Lori Beth Denberg; Superdude Saves Christmas: While delivering some presents, Santa spies cookies and milk and tries to eat them--but he is trapped in a cage instead. Milkman is up to his usual tricks--he wants to ruin Christmas! He takes Santa to his secret lair, but Penny Lane soon shows up...along with Superdude, who was hiding in a giant present! Santa is freed and uses some karate on Milkman to beat him severely, leaving Superdude to save the day.; Holiday French w/ Pierre Escargot: Pierre wishes us a "Joyeux Noelle" with his Christmasy phrases in French.; Christmas Lemonade Scammer; Peter & Flem: Peter gets presents from Santa because he is a good boy. Flem gets presents, too--but only because he steals them.; The Girls' Christmas Carol; Mavis & Clavis introduce Musical Guest: Run DMC – "Christmas in Hollis"
| 26 | 11 | "Xscape" | January 6, 1996 | 226 | N/A |
Green Room-The Drink Experiment: The kids brew some new drinks, and there are unique side effects, such as giving Kel temporary invisibility and turning Kevin into a little girl.; Superdude vs. Butterboy: Mark Cant's movie theater date with Penny Lane is interrupted by bullies, so Mark transforms into Superdude to take them out. Things get worse when Butterboy (Kel), Milkman's "butter-in-law," arrives. With some help from the Explaining Girl, Superdude melts the buttery baddie with his heat vision.; Vital Information w/Lori Beth Denberg; Bad Breath 3: A movie advertising a student (Josh) with extremely bad breath. It's even worse than Bad Breath 1 and 2, and it's rated PU-13!; Lumpco Toy Co.: Said company hires designers (Josh and Kenan) who have invented some crazy new toys, e.g. the Stinkphone (a toy telephone that smells of Limburger cheese), Doggie Bye-Bye (a toy dog that plays dead), and the Punch Fighter 2000 video game.; Pierre Escargot; Date Sabotage: A little girl named Becky (Katrina) wants to spend some time with her older sister Karen (Alisa), but she has a date with her boyfriend, Bryan (Josh). The girl proceeds to ruin the date with nasty tricks, such as putting hot sauce in his root beer, tying his shoelaces together, putting a cactus on his seat, and pouring itching powder down his neck.; Peter & Flem; Superdude introduces Musical Guest: Xscape – "Who Can I Run To"
| 27 | 12 | "Diana King" | January 13, 1996 | 227 | 2.32 |
Green Room-Magic Basketball: The cast members play a game of basketball before the show. But this basketball is very special. If a cast member makes a basket after making a wish, the wish will come true! The kids have fun abusing this special power.; While teaching a wrestling class, Coach Kreeton is being driven crazy by his students.; Vital Information w/Lori Beth Denberg; Earboy: Earboy thinks that girls will like him if he knows how to dance. Ross Perot teaches him "The Rossy Shuffle".; Pierre Escargot; Lemonade Scammer: An extremely thirsty customer (Tim Goodwin) begs for a drink. Katrina tosses a pitcher of lemonade at him...and charges a ridiculous price of $160!; Peter and Flem: Shows a life of differences between Peter (Kel) and Flem (Josh).; Ross Perot meets and introduces Musical Guest: Diana King – "Shy Guy"
| 28 | 13 | "Sinbad/Coolio" | January 20, 1996 | 228 | N/A |
Green Room-Prank Calls: The older cast members teach Katrina about prank calls. That is until their refrigerator starts running, literally.; Okrah: Talented Teenagers: Okrah Winfrey shows kids doing crazy talents, such as drinking 100 gallons of tomato juice and doing impressions. This sketch also features Earboy (who is introduced as "Mr. X") and Ross Perot.; Vital Information w/ Lori Beth Denberg; Like Father, Like Ishboo: Ishboo's father Sinboo (guest star Sinbad, who appears in the Okrah sketch as well as in this one), accompanied by two attendants, visits him in Miss Fingerly's class.; Cooking with Randy & Mandy: Chocolate Inventions; Good Burger introduces Musical Guest: Coolio – "Smilin'"
| 29 | 14 | "Mark Curry/Deborah Cox" | April 6, 1996 | 229 | N/A |
Green Room-Mark Curry: Mark Curry is desperate to be on the show but the cast members refuse, so he ties up Kenan and puts on his Superdude costume. Surprisingly, no one is able to tell the difference. Special Guest: Mark Curry; Miss Fingerly meets the members of the band Bacteria--Maggot (Josh), Rash (Alisa), and Spew (Kenan)--when they join her class.; Vital Information w/ Lori Beth Denberg; Good Burger Drive-Thru: Ed must take over the Drive-Thru and the counter.; Pierre Escargot; Complaint Department; Complaint Department introduces Musical Guest: Deborah Cox – "Sentimental"
| 30 | 15 | "Immature" | April 13, 1996 | 230 | 2.25 |
Green Room-Cast Charades: The cast members play a game of charades, but their choices and guesses are odd--very odd, indeed.; Bruno (Kenan) the Ballerina; Vital Information w/ Lori Beth Denberg; Island Girls: The Rescue; Presto the Magic Magician: Presto, a "magic" magician (Kenan), and his assistant, Abby Cadabra (Angelique), "entertain" the audience.; Peter & Flem; The Okrah Show: Topic: Immature People; Okrah introduces Musical Guest: Immature – "We Got It"
| 31 | 16 | "Silk" | April 20, 1996 | 233 | 2.18 |
Green Room-Writers Go Bananas: For some reason, the writers' sketches have to do with bananas! The kids investigate...and find that monkeys are doing all of the work!; Superdude and Milkman: Superdude has to protect Dullmont Jr. High when Milkman is found innocent in a court case (a parody of the infamous O.J. Simpson trial). When Milkman shows up with some thugs armed with milk-filled squirt guns, Superdude is forced to surrender. The dairy-based villain then blasts Superdude with a machine that drains his superpowers and turns him into a little boy, who is promptly shoved into a locker. As Milkman gloats, the students and staff decide to fight back--Jimmy (Kel), a friend of Mark's/Superdude's and Penny's, grabs the machine and throws it to Penny Lane (Angelique), who reverses it and restores Superdude. When the thugs try to shoot their milk at the hero, Miss Fingerly rushes to the rescue by blocking the streams with her body and chasing them off. Superdude then gives Milkman a taste of his own power-draining medicine, and the day is saved.; Vital Information w/ Lori Beth Denberg; Loud Librarian: All those who aren't quiet in Ms. Hushbaum's library will get in serious trouble. They may even have to deal with the noisy popcorn that Ms. Hushbaum is making while everyone tries to study, as well as her attempts to feed a talking parrot and a sudden fireworks celebration after she wins a trip to Memphis.; Pierre Escargot; Falafil (Alisa), the Genie of the Root Beer Can; Peter & Flem; Pierre Escargot introduces Musical Guest: Silk – "Hooked on You"
| 32 | 17 | "Terry Ellis" | September 28, 1996 | 231 | 1.77 |
Green Room-Bubble Gum Contest: Kenan, Kel, Katrina, and Alisa have a bubble-blowing contest before the show and Katrina's BIG bubble explodes and covers the green room with pink gum.; Coach Kreeton: The students visit Coach Kreeton at the hospital and make him feel even worse!; Vital Information w/Lori Beth Denberg; The Wizard of Coz: In this parody of The Wizard of Oz, Auntie Boo (Alisa) and Uncle Lizzie (Dan Schneider) tell Dorothy that she must take a shower, even though she doesn't want to. After wondering "Why Must I Take a Shower?", Dorothy is hit on the head by a windowsill and passes out. She later awakens in the colorful land of Cos, where she meets Mr. MacToad (Josh), a kindly man with an unsightly toad-like face. Dorothy realizes that she really does need a shower after all; Lisa (Lori Beth), the good witch, tells her to "Follow That Fellow MacToad" to meet the Great and Powerful Cos. Along the way, Dorothy and Mr. MacToad meet Pasta-Mon (Kel), a Pastafarian man who is made entirely of noodles--but he has no sauce. All three reach the Great and Powerful Cos's brownstone apartment, where they discover that he is none other than Bill Cosby (Kenan; they are initially greeted by Camille Cosby [Angelique], who then disappears). After hearing of their plight, Cosby agrees to help by giving Pasta-Mon a bowl of French vanilla pudding and telling him to add some ground beef to make a sauce, then sticking a brown paper bag on Mr. MacToad's head (which, he explains, will make everyone else happy). But Cosby's inane rambling about peanuts, avocados, and underpants can't help Dorothy get clean; Lisa reappears and tells her that all she needs to do is slap her own face repeatedly while saying "There's no place like my shower!". She does so and awakens back in her own bathtub, where her family (including her cousins, who are played by Josh, Kel, and Kenan) welcome her as she promises to never run away again.; Miss Fingerly & her Class introduce Musical Guest: Terry Ellis – "Wherever You Are"
| 33 | 18 | "Faith Evans" | October 5, 1996 | 232 | N/A |
Green Room-The Sick Corn: The Big Ear of Corn is in the hospital. Everyone is sad--especially Lori Beth. Everyone's mood changes, though, when the Ear of Corn is revealed to have had babies (each of which is still at least twice the mass of a large standard ear of corn)!; Cheese Police Bust; Vital Information w/ Lori Beth Denberg; Ms Fingerly meets Repairman: Ms. Fingerly's map of the world is broken. Repairman falls from the ceiling to save the day. He then tries to repair a girl's broken desk. Miss Fingerly calls for help, but her head gets stuck in the window. The sketch ends as Repairman turns on his chainsaw to "fix" the window.; Ishboo has a memorable visit with Dr. Prober (Kel).; Pierre Escargot introduce Musical Performance: Faith Evans – "You Used To Love Me"
| 34 | 19 | "Shai" | October 12, 1996 | 234 | 2.00 |
Green Room-Card Trickery: The gang play a card trick on Josh.; Good Blur-Ger: An elephant escapes from the zoo and comes into Good Burger, and Ed is accidentally hit with a tranquilizer dart by the animal control officers.; Vital Information w/ Lori Beth Denberg; Goat Date: A guy named Arthur (Kel) is supposed to go on a blind date at the fair with a girl named Patricia (Angelique), but he mistakes the goat at the petting zoo for her. Arthur's friend (Josh) told him that Patricia would be at the petting zoo, and that she'd be wearing a red hair ribbon, but the goat had one, too, on her left horn.; Pierre Escargot; Let's Get Messy: A game show hosted by Phil Phlegm (Josh) and Zuzu the Infected Elf (Katrina), where kids (Kel, Angelique, and Alisa) get their parents extremely messy.; Peter & Flem introduce Musical Guest: Shai – "Come with Me"
| 35 | 20 | "IV Xample" | October 19, 1996 | 235 | N/A |
Green Room-Requests from the Audience: The audience has some odd requests for the cast members.; Good Boo-oo-Ger: Ed is haunted on Saturday the 14th by the ghost of former manager John Rogan (Tim Goodwin) of Good Burger.; Vital Information w/Lori Beth Denberg; Principal Pimpell (Kenan, who plays said character from this point on), Miss Fingerly, & Coach Kreeton try to figure out who stole the Dullmont mascot, The Fighting Salmon. The number one suspect in the crime is Earboy! Coach Kreeton and Miss Fingerly put the giant-eared teen through the paces of a kangaroo trial, and assume his guilt on ridiculous charges. Thankfully, Ross Perot comes to the rescue by providing a mountain of salmon to the school and buying off Coach Kreeton, who promptly loses his new fortune when he's hit by a car.; Did You Hear? This is Angelique Bates's final appearance in an All That sketch.; Peter & Flem; Vital Intro Musical Guest: IV Xample – "This is From the Fool"
| 36 | 21 | "Monifah" | October 26, 1996 | 237 | N/A |
Green Room-The Future: The cast members think about what they will be like 60 years in the future.; Detective Dan at a Museum Heist, in which a visitor named Baumon (Katrina) steals King Harold's golden trousers, which, according to the tour guide (Lori Beth), are worth $14,000,000,000.10 (the guide also claims that King Harold ruled the area that is now the state of Nebraska at least 6 millennia ago, or at around 4100 B. C. E.). When Detective Dan arrives, he attempts to arrest another visitor, Ashley (Alisa), because she has dark hair and is wearing a green shirt and eating a hot dog. Two other visitors, Casy and Courtney, are played by Matt Thompson and Amanda Rich.; Vital Information; Parallel Planet: A cube-shaped Earth-like planet (each side of which therefore has an area of about 85 million square kilometers) on which kids can do whatever they want and their parents encourage them to play video games, and to eat dessert for dinner.; Pierre Escargot; Ice Cream Truck: A guy named Eddie Beuerlein (Josh) races to get a sundae from the O'Bese Bros. Ice Cream truck. Josh is the only regular cast member of All That to appear in this sketch. Eddie's younger sister, and his friend Jimmy, are played by uncredited guest stars. Writer Heath Seifert plays the ice cream truck driver, as well as one of the visitors to the museum in the Museum Heist sketch.; Peter & Flem; Detective Dan Intro Musical Guest: Monifah – "I Miss You"; Angelique Bates's final episode as a cast member.; Last episode taped in Nickelodeon Studios at Universal Orlando Resort.

=== Special (1996) ===
| Title | Original release date | Prod. code | Viewers (millions) |
|---|---|---|---|
| "Good Burger Special" | March 23, 1996 | 236 | N/A |
When the cast orders Good Burger for lunch, the food gets disassembled on the way, so Ed must rearrange the burgers together while the cast watches various Good Burger sketches from season one.
