= Rufus Blaq discography =

Rufus Blaq is an American hip-hop artist who rose to fame with his single "Out of Sight (Yo)" which was featured on the Ride soundtrack. Additionally, he is best known for creating songs with Salt-N-Pepa, Faith Evans, Destiny's Child, Marques Houston, Young Rome, Angie Stone and Omarion.

== Studio albums and singles ==
List of studio albums as artist, with selected chart positions.

| Year | Song title | Album name | Label | Chart position |
|---|---|---|---|---|
| 1997 | "Out Of Sight (Yo)" (aka "Outta Sight") | Single | Perspective Records | #18 Billboard Hot 100 |
| 1998 | "Artifacts of Life (Featuring The Lox) | Credentials | Perspective Records | |
| 1998 | "Come Alive Y'all" | Credentials | Perspective Records | |
| 1998 | True Ballerz | Credentials | Perspective Records | |
| 1998 | Ambush Crew | Credentials | Perspective Records | |
| 1998 | Magic | Credentials | Perspective Records | |
| 1998 | "Make It Hot" | Credentials | Perspective Records | |
| 1998 | The True Gas Up (Interlude) | Credentials | Perspective Records | |
| 1998 | Come Go with Me | Credentials | Perspective Records | |
| 1998 | Hong Kong Booty (Interlude) | Credentials | Perspective Records | |
| 1998 | "Give It to Me Daddy" | Credentials | Perspective Records | |
| 1998 | Real MC's | Credentials | Perspective Records | |
| 1998 | My Life | Credentials | Perspective Records | |
| 1998 | Get to Steppin' (Interlude) | Credentials | Perspective Records | |
| 1998 | Niggaz Like Me | Credentials | Perspective Records | |
| 1998 | If I Was a Killer | Credentials | Perspective Records | |
| 1998 | Credentials | Credentials | Perspective Records | |
| 2011 | Into | Electric Pretty (Mixtape) | Tekzenmusic | |
| 2011 | Get My Money | Electric Pretty (Mixtape) | Tekzenmusic | |
| 2011 | Electric Pretty | Electric Pretty (Mixtape) | Tekzenmusic | |
| 2011 | Get Ready | Electric Pretty (Mixtape) | Tekzenmusic | |
| 2011 | It's My Turn | Electric Pretty (Mixtape) | Tekzenmusic | |
| 2011 | Duck Into a Swan | Electric Pretty (Mixtape) | Tekzenmusic | |
| 2011 | Spill Ya Drink | Electric Pretty (Mixtape) | Tekzenmusic | |
| 2011 | Eclectic Life | Electric Pretty (Mixtape) | Tekzenmusic | |
| 2011 | My Companionship | Electric Pretty (Mixtape) | Tekzenmusic | |
| 2011 | Build em | Electric Pretty (Mixtape) | Tekzenmusic | |
| 2011 | Gracias | Electric Pretty (Mixtape) | Tekzenmusic | |
| 2011 | Inspire You | Electric Pretty (Mixtape) | Tekzenmusic | |
| 2011 | 6 ft Pretty | Electric Pretty (Mixtape) | Tekzenmusic | |
| 2016 | "2 Da Head" | Total Frat Movie Soundtrack | New Heat Music | |
| 2016 | "I Wont Remember Tomorrow" | Total Frat Movie Soundtrack | New Heat Music | |
| 2016 | "Going Till I'm Gone" | Total Frat Movie Soundtrack | New Heat Music | |
| 2016 | "Party of the Year" | Total Frat Movie Soundtrack | New Heat Music | |
| 2016 | "Lets Go" | Total Frat Movie Soundtrack | New Heat Music | |
| 2016 | "Frat Star" | Total Frat Movie Soundtrack | New Heat Music | |
| 2016 | "Not Asking for Much" | Total Frat Movie Soundtrack | New Heat Music | |
| 2016 | "Don't Stop Here (Caps in the Sky)" | Total Frat Movie Soundtrack | New Heat Music | |
| 2015 | "Blaq The Ripper Intro (produced by TEK)" | Blaq The Ripper (Mixtape) | Tekzenmusic | |
| 2015 | "Crucifix" (produced by Don Kody) | Blaq The Ripper (Mixtape) | Tekzenmusic | |
| 2015 | "Lyrical Murder" (produced by Chuckie Madness) | Blaq The Ripper (Mixtape) | Tekzenmusic | |
| 2015 | "My Weight" feat. B. Mos & Sydney Arcane (produced by Al West) | Blaq The Ripper (Mixtape) | Tekzenmusic | |
| 2015 | "Slaughterhouse" | Blaq The Ripper (Mixtape) | Tekzenmusic | |
| 2015 | "The Verdict" (produced by Tony Galvin) | Blaq The Ripper (Mixtape) | Tekzenmusic | |
| 2015 | "You Not Me" feat. Blok (produced by DNyce3 of League of Stars) | Blaq The Ripper (Mixtape) | Tekzenmusic | |
| 2015 | "The Light" feat. Ollie Baba & 100 Proof (produced by Anthony Bell) | Blaq The Ripper (Mixtape) | Tekzenmusic | |
| 2015 | "Jamaica Interlude feat. Kimani" | Blaq The Ripper (Mixtape) | Tekzenmusic | |
| 2015 | "Quiet Storm feat. Murda Kase" | Blaq The Ripper (Mixtape) | Tekzenmusic | |
| 2015 | "Burn feat. Tomi Jones" | Blaq The Ripper (Mixtape) | Tekzenmusic | |
| 2015 | "Too Sexy feat. King Ralph, Don Kody, Man-Child & Juice Brown (produced by Don Kody)" | Blaq The Ripper (Mixtape) | Tekzenmusic | |
| 2015 | "Gimme The Keys feat. MC Lyte" | Blaq The Ripper (Mixtape) | Tekzenmusic | |
| 2015 | "Gettin Money feat. Chyna Tahjere (produced by Don Kody)" | Blaq The Ripper (Mixtape) | Tekzenmusic | |
| 2015 | "Don't Let Me Lose You feat. Jay Calloway (produced by Andreao Fanatic Heard)" | Blaq The Ripper (Mixtape) | Tekzenmusic | |
| 2015 | "Maserati Music feat. Omarion, Rome & Boo Young (produced by Michael Angelo)" | Blaq The Ripper (Mixtape) | Tekzenmusic | |
| 2015 | "Turbulence feat. PG (produced by Easy Mo Bee)" | Blaq The Ripper (Mixtape) | Tekzenmusic | |
| 2015 | "Live It Up feat. J. Fury & Sydney Arcane" | Blaq The Ripper (Mixtape) | Tekzenmusic | |
| 2015 | "Winning (produced by Chuckie Madness)" | Blaq The Ripper (Mixtape) | Tekzenmusic | |
| 2015 | "Pressure (produced by Arkitech)" | Blaq The Ripper (Mixtape) | Tekzenmusic | |
| 2015 | "Silly feat. Talib Kweli" | Blaq The Ripper (Mixtape) | Tekzenmusic | |
| 2015 | "Trufus" | Blaq The Ripper (Mixtape) | Tekzenmusic | |
| 2015 | "30 Something" | Blaq The Ripper (Mixtape) | Tekzenmusic | |

== Featured artist ==
List of singles as featured vocalist and/or artist.

| Year | Song | Artist | Album | Label |
|---|---|---|---|---|
| 2017 | "Ten Wife Commandments" | Faith Evans & The Notorious B.I.G. | The King & I | Rhino |
| 2007 | “Beautiful Poison” Feat. Rufus Blaq | Herb Middleton | Big Herb’s Bodega | NuVybe Records |
| 2005 | "I Wasn't Ready" (featuring Rufus Blaq) | Marques Houstson | Naked | Ultimate Universal |
| 2004 | "Crazy Girl" (featuring Rufus Blaq) | Young Rome | Food For Thought | T.U.G entertainment/Universal Records |
| 2004 | "Freaky" (feat. Guerilla Black And Rufus Blaq) | Young Rome | Food For Thought | T.U.G entertainment/Universal Records |
| 2003 | "Smellz Like a Party" (featuring Rufus Blaq) | O'Ryan | You Got Served Soundtrack | Epic Records |
| 1998 | "Dance for Me" (featuring Rufus Blaq) | Kevin Ford | How Stella Got Her Groove Back Soundtrack | Flyte Tyme |
| 1998 | "Don't Worry (My Shorty)" | Rufus Blaq & Spinderella | The Players Club Soundtrack | PolyGram |
| 2002 | "Whoop His Ass" | Boot Camp Clik | The Chosen Few | Duck Down Music |
| 1998 | "Outta Sight" | Rufus Blaq | Ride (Music from the Dimension Motion Picture) | Tommy Boy |
| 1998 | “Whatcha Gonna Do” (feat. Rufus Blaq & Femme Fatale) | Monifah | Mo’hogany | Motown Universal |
| 1998 | “Why You Not Trusting Me” (feat. Rufus Blaq) | Public Announcement | All Work No Play | A&M Records |
| 1998 | “Get this Money” (Feat. Rufus Blaq, Chico Delvec, And Larceny) | Junior M.A.F.I.A | The Best of JUNIOR M.A.F.I.A. | Famous Records |
| 1998 | “What Are We Gonna Do” Remix (feat. Rufus Blaq) | Ronnie Henson | Ronnie Henson | Motown/Universal |
| 1998 | “Strawberries” Mark Kinchen Remix (feat. Rufus Blaq) | Smooth | Reality | Perspective A&M Records |

== Production and songwriting credits ==
List of songs credited as a producer and/or songwriter, with chart positions.

| Year | Song | Artist | Producer / Songwriter | Album | Label | Chart position |
|---|---|---|---|---|---|---|
| 2017 | "Ten Wife Commandments" | Faith Evans | Songwriter | The King & I | Rhino | |
| 2017 | "My B" | Faith Evans | Songwriter | The King & I | Rhino | |
| 2014 | "Forever" | Faith Evans | Producer / Songwriter | Incomparable | BMG | |
| 2007 | "Can't Get Tired of Me" | Bow Wow & Omarion | Producer / Songwriter | Face Off | Columbia | |
| 2007 | "Number Ones" | Bow Wow & Omarion | Producer / Songwriter | Face Off | Columbia | |
| 2007 | "Hoodstars" | Bow Wow & Omarion | Producer / Songwriter | Face Off | Columbia | |
| 2007 | "Bachelor Pad" | Bow Wow & Omarion | Producer / Songwriter | Face Off | Columbia | |
| 2007 | "Face-Off" | Bow Wow & Omarion | Producer / Songwriter | Face Off | Columbia | |
| 2007 | "Lights, Camera, Action" | Bow Wow & Omarion | Producer / Songwriter | Face Off | Columbia | |
| 2007 | "Kimberly" | Marques Houston | Producer / Songwriter | Veteran | Universal Motown | |
| 2006 | "What Are We Doing" | Omarion | Producer / Songwriter | 21 | Epic | |
| 2005 | "Pissed Off" | Angie Stone | Songwriter | Mahogany Soul | J Records | |
| 2005 | "Marriage" | Marques Houston | Songwriter / Co-Producer | Naked | Ultimate Universal | |
| 2005 | "Cheat" | Marques Houston | Songwriter / Co-Producer | Naked | Ultimate Universal | |
| 2005 | "All Because of You" | Marques Houston | Songwriter | Naked | Ultimate Universal | |
| 2004 | "Lovers' Ghetto" | Angie Stone | Producer / Songwriter | Stone Love | J Records | |
| 2004 | "Down 4 U, Part 2" | Jhené featuring Lil' Fizz | Songwriter | My Name Is Jhene | Epic Records | |
| 2004 | "In My Car" | Young Rome | Songwriter | Food For Thought | Universal Records | |
| 2004 | "Beauty" | N2U | Songwriter | Issues | Virgin | |
| 2004 | "After Party" | Young Rome Featuring Omarion | Songwriter | After Party | Universal Records | |
| 2003 | "Good Luck" | Marques Houston | Producer | MH | Interscope | |
| 2003 | "Smellz Like a Party" | O'Ryan featuring Rufus Blaq | Songwriter | You Got Served Soundtrack | Epic Records | |
| 2003 | "Take It to the Floor" | B2K | Songwriter | You Got Served Soundtrack | Epic Records | |
| 2001 | "Whoop-T-Woo" | Olivia | Producer | Olivia | J Records | |
| 2001 | "Snowflakes" | Angie Stone | Producer / Songwriter | Mahogany Soul | J Records | |
| 2001 | "Mad Issues" | Angie Stone | Producer / Songwriter | Mahogany Soul | J Records | |
| 2001 | "If It Wasn't" | Angie Stone | Producer / Songwriter | Mahogany Soul | J Records | |
| 1999 | "Jumpin, Jumpin" | Destiny's Child | Songwriter | The Writing's on the Wall | Columbia | #1 Billboard Hot 100 |
| 1997 | "R U Ready" | Salt-N-Pepa | Songwriter | Brand New | London Records | #61 on Billboard Radio |
| 1997 | "Gitty Up" (single) | Salt-N-Pepa | Songwriter | Brand New | London Records | #9 on Billboard Hot 100 |
