= Tear It Up =

Tear It Up may refer to:

- "Tear It Up (Johnny Burnette Song)", a song by Johnny Burnette, 1956
- "Tear It Up" (Queen song), 1984
- "Tear It Up (On Our Worst Behavior)", a song by Immature, 1992
- "Tear It Up", a song by Andrew W.K. from The Wolf, 200
- "Tear It Up" (Yung Wun song), 2004
- "Tear It Up", a song by Young Jeezy from Let's Get It: Thug Motivation 101, 2005
- "Tear It Up", a song by Hollywood Undead from Desperate Measures, 2009
- "Tear It Up", a song by R. Kelly from Black Panties, 2013
