= All That season 1 =

All That
- Season 1
- The cast of the first two seasons with producers Mike Tollin, Brian Robbins, Dan Schneider, Joe Davola, Kevin Kopelow, and Heith Seifert; pictured for the pilot episode in January 1994.
- Starring: Angelique Bates; Lori Beth Denberg; Katrina Johnson; Kel Mitchell; Alisa Reyes; Josh Server; Kenan Thompson
- No. of episodes: 15

Release
- Original network: Nickelodeon
- Original release: April 16, 1994 – April 29, 1995

Season chronology
- Next → Season 2

The first season of the American sketch comedy-variety show All That ran on April 16, 1994, as a special preview, but officially ran from January to April 1995. The first season began in 1994–1995 with the pilot and 14 episodes. On April 16, 1994, Nickelodeon aired the All That pilot, which was the beginning of Season 1, the beginning of the "Golden Era", and the start of the All That series.

After You Can't Do That on Television ended production in 1990, Nickelodeon had interest in creating another sketch comedy series for the network. The network debuted another sketch show called Roundhouse in 1992. After the show's debut, Nickelodeon asked Mike Tollin and Brian Robbins to create a new show. The network wanted a show that was similar to Saturday Night Live, but for children. Joe Davola, Kevin Kopelow, Dan Schneider and Heath Seifert were brought on as producers and were a major part of the writing force for the show.

Producers went on a search to finds kids to join the cast after the network green-lit the show. Angelique Bates, Lori Beth Denberg, Katrina Johnson, Kel Mitchell, Alisa Reyes, Josh Server, and Kenan Thompson were hired. Bates got a call from her agent about the show in late 1992. She auditioned by doing an impression of Steve Urkel, which she would get to do various times on the show. Denberg was discovered by producers at a drama competition; she was invited to audition and got the gig. Johnson, Mitchell, Reyes, Server, and Thompson went through a series of auditions to get on the show.

In 1994, Nickelodeon canceled Roundhouse and aired the pilot on April 16 of the same year. The show featured producer Kevin Kopelow as the stage manager which the cast members do something bad to him constantly, exclusively during the cold opens. The first season was broadcast from Orlando, Florida. The show's cold openings featured the cast in a green room and their departure from the room. To resemble Saturday Night Live, producers added the segment Vital Information which would be featured in every episode just like SNL's Weekend Update segment. Producers bumped Denberg up to anchor the segment.

The theme song for All That was performed by TLC. The intro features the entire cast in an alleyway. They are playing games and playing with a sheet with the All That logo on it. The cast jumps on unseen trampolines. The intro starts off with the announcer saying, "Not quite live, but ready for prime time. Get Ready, get set, it's All That." After that the All That theme song begins. It starts off with Johnson holding a sign of the word, "Oh". Then two people are shown playing racket ball in the alleyway. Then the cast is shown, with their names shown in bright red. Their first and last names are separated by the series’ logo, with the musical guest being shown after Thompson. The intro ends with a pan shot of the entire cast with the names of the producers flashing by.

Action League Now! aired as part of the show for two shorts. More were planned, but then the show was moved to All That's first spin-off, KaBlam!.

This season was taped from January 1994 to September 1994 at Nickelodeon Studios.

== Cast ==
Repertory players

- Angelique Bates
- Lori Beth Denberg (Note: Vital Information anchor)
- Katrina Johnson
- Kel Mitchell
- Alisa Reyes
- Josh Server
- Kenan Thompson

== Episodes ==
No. overall	No. in season	Title	Original release date	Prod. code
1	1	"Phil Moore/TLC"	April 16, 1994	PILOT
Cold Open: Cool Shoes: The kids hang out on a playground, complimenting each other on their sneakers. Things get progressively odder as Kenan reveals a pair of shoes with a CD player, which Kel trumps with sneakers that come with a stereo and yogurt dispenser. It seems as though he has the coolest sneakers around... until Katrina shows off her own pair, which have rockets that allow her to fly.; Baggin' Saggin' Barry: The scoutmaster (Kel) of the Jr. Badger Buddies tells his troop that they're lost in the woods. Everyone begins to panic, except Baggin' Saggin' Barry (Kenan), a boy with an extremely large set of pants. He reveals that he keeps a vast amount of supplies inside the pants, including a lantern, the ingredients for tuna sandwiches, a tent, reclining chair, and even a pinball machine. Though the scoutmaster is jealous at first, he comes to accept Barry's help, and even remarks that he'd love to have a child like him. Barry obliges by producing a newborn baby from his pants.; First Baggin' Saggin' Barry ever.; Luck E Cheese: A group of kids (including Angelique, Lori Beth, Alisa, and Josh) stand in line outside of Luck E. Cheese, a popular pizza parlor. But to enter, they must get past the tough-talking bouncer (Katrina). The kids aren't intimidated until the bouncer drags a man twice her size out of the restaurant by his ear. Nickelodeon actor Phil Moore attempts to use his celebrity status to cut the line, but the bouncer is less than starstruck, and repeatedly assaults him until he follows the rules.; All That's first guest star, Phil Moore, host of Nick Arcade and current host of You're On!; Steve Urkel Showdown: Two different kids (Angelique and Kel) claim to be Steve Urkel, and compete to prove that they are the true Family Matters character by screaming out catchphrases from the program.; Annie's Song: Little Orphan Annie (Katrina) tries to sing "Tomorrow," a song from her famous musical. Things go well until a bag of flour rips open above Annie, dousing her.; Miss Fingerly in "Enough for Everyone" : Miss Fingerly (Lori Beth) is watching her class when she notices that one boy (Josh) is chewing gum. She makes him spit it out by reminding him of her classroom rule: students can only bring in outside objects if they bring enough for their classmates. She tries to give the same lecture to another student (Angelique) who is listening to music--but the girl did bring "large radios" for everyone. Things only get worse when another boy (Kel) comes in eating pudding (he provides a wheelbarrow full of dessert) and babysitting his little brother. Chaos reigns when the student calls in the ten other small boys he brought so that all of the students can have little brothers as well.; First Miss Fingerly appearance. Also the only time (apart from in "Aftermath featuring Kel Mitchell") she is seen wearing glasses.; GLORP: In a parody of 1950's B-movies, a man (played by producer Dan Schneider) discovers a strange glowing light in his refrigerator one night. The next morning, a cop (Alisa) and scientist (Kenan) console his heartbroken family (Lori Beth, Josh, and Katrina), who reveal that they have been eating nothing but leftover meatloaf for three weeks. The scientist determines that the food transformed into Gooey Left Over Refrigerator Pus, or "GLORP," a horrible creature that devours human brains (as proven when the father is discovered in a closet making noises like an ambulance).; Annie's Song Reprise: Annie tries to sing "Tomorrow" again. This time, a massive explosion interrupts her tune.; Earboy: Earboy (Josh) is taunted by the other kids at school because of his large ears; each one is approximately 8 inches high by 5 inches wide, and has an area of about 17 square inches. He seeks the guidance of H. Ross Perot (Katrina), who uses charts to show Earboy's options: he can either go to a school where he'll be more welcome, or flush himself down a toilet. The announcer encourages the audience to tune in next week to see Earboy transfer to a new school, where he meets Pizza Face (Kel), Four Eyes (Angelique), and Tinsel Teeth (Alisa).; First appearance of Earboy, H. Ross Perot, Pizza Face and Four Eyes.; Annie's Song Reprise Reprise: Annie makes one final attempt to sing "Tomorrow," only to be carried away by two secret agents (Josh and Kel).; TLC Intro: Mavis (Kenan) and Clavis (Kel) introduce TLC.; First appearance of Mavis and Clavis.; TLC performs their 1992 song from Ooooooohhh... On the TLC Tip, "What About Your Friends." Afterward, Mavis and Clavis discuss how much they liked the performance, and try to sing along.; Leap Froggy Frog: Alisa travels to the "pad" (literally) of Leap Froggy Frog (Kenan), a giant amphibian and parody of Snoop Doggy Dog whose rap songs are climbing the charts. Leap Froggy Frog introduces her to his "Fly Girls" (played by TLC), and shares the story of his hard life growing up as a tadpole. Alisa decides to end the interview when Leap Froggy Frog starts eating flies in front of her.; Angelique Bates, Lori Beth Denberg, Katrina Johnson, Kel Mitchell, Alisa Reyes, Josh Server, and Kenan Thompson's first episode as cast members.
2	2	"Da Brat"	January 21, 1995	101
Green Room – Kenan's Nervous: Kenan is so nervous before the show starts that he begins pouring with sweat.; Cooking With Randy And Mandy: Randy (Kenan) and Mandy (Angelique) host their own cooking show, where they teach their audience the benefits of cooking with chocolate.; Earboy (Josh) is very unpopular at school--largely because his ears are as big as his head. He notices that his friends Pizza Face (Kel) and Four Eyes (Angelique) have managed to gain popularity by getting their ears pierced. Earboy travels to the mansion of H. Ross Perot (Katrina), who uses a drill to pierce Earboy's massive earlobe and gives him a lantern to wear in it. The scheme works, and Earboy and his lantern are invited to a party with the rest of the cool kids.; Radio talk show host Dr. K (Kel) is joined by Bill Cosby (Kenan) and together they answer parents' questions about their kids. Most of Cosby's advice pertains to giving children much "yellow puddin'".; First-ever Vital Information with Lori Beth Denberg.; Good Burger: Ed (Kel) is a bad cashier at Good Burger. He messes up a girl's (Katrina) order, takes a sip of a girl's (Alisa) shake, and asks a girl if there is anything up his nose.; First Good Burger segment.; More Vital Information; The cast members want to get Da Brat's autograph before she performs. She's happy to oblige, but things take a turn for the strange when she has to sign Josh's forehead, Alisa's hamburger, Kenan's underwear, Kel's report card, and Lori Beth's grandmother. She draws the line at this, and offers to let Lori Beth and her grandmother introduce her instead.; Musical Guest: Da Brat – "Fa All Y'all"
3	3	"TLC"	January 28, 1995	102
Green Room – No One's Ready: Kevin must get the cast members to the stage in six minutes, as the show is about to begin. Unfortunately, all of the kids are busy-Lori Beth is talking on the phone, Alisa is on a stair-stepping machine, Kenan is sleeping, Angelique is counting over 50,000 jelly beans, Josh and Kel are in a hot tub, and Katrina is handcuffed to some stairs. Kevin thinks his job is lost, but suddenly, everyone rushes out, completely ready to go.; Ishboo's New Family: A foreign exchange student named Ishboo (Kenan) comes to live with a new American family. While there, he demonstrates some of his strange customs, including hiding behind furniture when someone sneezes, sticking one's face into a bowl of creamed corn, and having parents wrestle each other outside.; Vital Information with Lori Beth Denberg; Lemonade Scammer: Little Katrina scams a runner (Josh) out of his money by charging extra for a cup, ice, and sugar.; The Adventures of Superdude: Little Sally (Katrina) is trapped in the bathroom, but Superdude (Kenan) is there to save the day. He quickly destroys the door, freeing Sally. Sally's mother (Lori Beth) offers Superdude some brownies as a reward, but they cause him to collapse, as they contain milk. Superdude's arch-enemy Milkman (Josh) barges in. He threatens Superdude with individually sliced yellow American cheese. Little Sally comes to the rescue and eats the cheese, leaving Superdude to trap Milkman in a closet.; Lemonade Scammer: When a girl (Alisa) doesn't want to buy Little Katrina's lemonade, she offers her some free peanuts instead, which were soaked in jalapeno pepper juice. Katrina charges a hefty price to help the girl.; Mavis and Clavis stumble into TLC's dressing room. While there, they teach the girls a new song – "Creep".; Mavis and Clavis introduce musical guest: TLC – "Creep".; Lemonade Scammer: After their performance, the girls of TLC are thirsty, so they decide to buy some lemonade. Katrina charges them only twenty-five cents, and then proceeds to shove her pitcher off the lemonade stand. Katrina sobs hysterically that TLC broke the pitcher, and claims that the pitcher cost $700. She takes a credit card from TLC and calls it a day.
4	4	"Immature"	February 4, 1995	103
Green Room – The Scary Story: The cast tells a scary story before the show, about a terrifying monster with a dangling eyeball and a pickle for a nose. No one is that scared, until the monster himself shows up to finish the story.; Teenage secret agent Jimmy Bond (Josh) must defeat Coldfinger (Kenan), a villain with a frozen finger from a milkshake machine incident. Coldfinger seeks revenge against the world and plans to blow up fast food restaurants with explosive hamburger meat. Luckily, he is too obsessed with pointing out his finger to actually do anything, and the world is saved.; Good Burger is selling a brand new item, Good Weenies.; Vital Information with Lori Beth Denberg; A stylist on the show tells Kenan that she studied for over four years to become a professional cosmetologist. Kenan decides that he does not need school to cut hair. He practices on a very large sleeping audience member, who seeks revenge on Kenan once he wakes up.; More Vital Information; Kel and Katrina introduce musical guests: Immature – "Constantly".
5	5	"Craig Mack"	February 11, 1995	104
Green Room – Katrina's TV: Kel and Katrina are meant to open the show with a caveman sketch, but things take a turn for the worse when the cast members find Katrina quite literally glued to the television set.; Randy and Mandy present their brand new invention: The Chocolator. The Chocolator can make any food more appetizing simply by covering it in solid milk chocolate. Randy eventually decides to indulge even further by sticking his own face directly into the Chocolator.; A guy (Josh) heads to the wrong house while trying to pick up his lost dog and is mistaken for a girl's (Alisa's) new date. Things get ugly when he innocently describes all of the fun things he likes to do with his "baby," including scratching her tummy and rubbing behind her ears.; Show & Tell: Daniel (Kenan) has forgotten to bring in an item for show and tell, so he takes Robert (Josh) out into the hallway and returns to show off a human spleen.; Alisa can't stop sneezing during the psychic sketch. She thinks she's allergic to something Kel is wearing, and makes him strip down to his boxers, but her sneezes don't stop. She then realizes that the sheep in the audience, who belongs to a shepherd (Kevin), is probably the culprit.; Vital Information with Lori Beth Denberg; Katrina and her pet cow Gassie introduce musical guest: Craig Mack – "Flava in Ya Ear".
6	6	"Malcolm-Jamal Warner/Brandy"	February 18, 1995	105
Special Guest: Malcolm-Jamal Warner: Green Room – The Liver Sketch: The cast members use fake excuses to escape doing a liver sketch.; Ishboo joins Miss Fingerly's class and gives her a lesson that she will never forget.; Vital Information with Lori Beth Denberg; Earboy runs for student body president, and develops a popular "No Homework" plan to be the cornerstone of his campaign. Things look bad when his bullying rival (Lori Beth) steals the plan and passes it off as her own. Thankfully, Earboy has an ally in Ross Perot, who knows a thing or two about elections (and has secretly set up video cameras throughout Dullmont Jr. High, for unknown reasons). With Perot's help, Earboy exposes the cheat (and her itchy armpits) and wins the office.; Everyday French with Pierre Escargot; The Laf-a-teria: A student keeps the kids from eating their lunch because every time he tells a joke they spill milk from their noses.; More Everyday French with Pierre Escargot; Musical Guest Intro: Pierre Escargot introduces the musical guest in French.; Musical Guest: Brandy – "Baby"
7	7	"Aaliyah"	February 25, 1995	106
Green Room – Josh's Dad: Josh's dad comes to the show to support his son, but all of his support just ends up embarrassing Josh.; Mavis and Clavis are hired at a sandwich deli, where they introduce their "Rama Lamba from Alabama".; Vital Information with Lori Beth Denberg; Coach Kreeton in "Oh Lordie, It's Gordie": A student's imaginary friend, Gordie, does more than irritate Coach Kreeton (Kel).; A fan of Alisa's interrupts the sketch. Then, a fan of Kenan's (really Kel, but this is not revealed) chases him in every sketch following, including the credits.; Crayopala Boardroom: Employees try to find a name for the latest green color.; Musical Guest Intro: Kel, Katrina, and Lori Beth announce that Aaliyah isn't ready and they will be performing instead. Josh comes onstage and scolds the trio for telling her the show was cancelled and "killer snakes were on the loose". He then introduces Aaliyah.; Musical Guest: Aaliyah – "Age Ain't Nothing But A Number"
8	8	"Coolio"	March 4, 1995	107
Green Room – The Psychic: Alisa's psychic tells her that something bad will happen on the show.; Good Burger in Love: Ed falls in love with the new Good Burger trainee, Beth (Angelique).; Vital Information with Lori Beth Denberg; The Prize Inside: A family returns home from a trip to the grocery store and starts unpacking the groceries. They keep finding prizes inside all of the food, including sunglasses in the mayonnaise and $36.30 in the lettuce.; An audience vendor interrupts a pirate sketch.; Baggin' Saggin' Barry in "The Airport": Baggin' Saggin' Barry and his fellow tennis-playing students are heading for a big tournament, and must fly to get there. Unfortunately, the seemingly bottomless supply of random items in Barry's pants keeps setting off the metal detector, and the coach (Kel) fears that they won't make their flight. Barry ends up saving the day by producing an airplane of his own.; Ed introduces musical guest: Coolio – "Fantastic Voyage".
9	9	"Soul 4 Real"	March 11, 1995	108
Green Room – Picked Last: Josh is picked last to play basketball, after a baby, a stuffed cat, and even a tree.; It's Superdude against Milkman in Milkman's Dairy Lair when he kidnaps Penny Lane (Angelique).; Vital Information with Lori Beth Denberg; What's in the Box? – In a game show, contestants must try to figure out what item is concealed a box. The host (Josh) keeps his cool until one insane contestant (Lori Beth) can't determine what round, orange-colored fruit used to make juice is concealed inside. As she repeatedly makes insane guesses, the host gradually goes crazy trying to get her to get the right answer.; Everyday French with Pierre Escargot; Two Girls (Angelique & Alisa) go on a double date with two annoying losers (Kenan & Josh). The girls go to bathroom and use any means necessary to get away from their dates such as trying to climb out the window, blowing up the wall, or even switching clothes with two boy scouts.; What's in the Box? introduce musical guest: Soul IV Real – "Candy Rain".
10	10	"Changing Faces"	March 18, 1995	109
Green Room – The Tour: People get a tour of the All That set.; Cooking with Randy & Mandy: Randy and Mandy are joined by Chef Monique (Lori Beth).; Schoolastic Snax: A commercial advertising edible school supplies.; Arlene Loofa (Lori Beth) performs stand-up in Math Class.; Cheese Police: Officer Jack Colby (Kel), of the Cheese Police, tries to stop a student (Kenan) from torturing Miss Fingerly, Principal Pimpell and the students.; More Arlene Loofa; Vital Information w/Lori Beth Denberg; Mavis and Clavis introduce musical guest: Changing Faces – "Foolin' Around".
11	11	"Blackstreet"	April 1, 1995	110
Green Room – Costume Mix-Up: Kevin directs the cast to the wrong dressing rooms to change for the football sketch. Now the boys are all dressed as cheerleaders and the girls are dressed up in football uniforms.; Kay (Angelique) gets more than she bargained for when her blind date turns out to be Ishboo.; Vital Information with Lori Beth Denberg; Lori Beth is taking driver's ed and her instructor is none other than Coach Kreeton. It's Coach vs. Student as Lori Beth upsets and wounds Kreeton in ways he can't understand.; Action League Now!: "I've Been Working On De-Rail Road" – The Action League team investigates a rash of railroad wrecks.; Miss Fingerly in "The Missing Eraser": Miss Fingerly's eraser has gone missing. As she turns her back to search for it, her students proceed to steal everything in the classroom, only to stop whenever she turns back around. She finally catches on when the students steal her wig.; Kreeton shouts out his window at some noisy nearby birds, until one dives through the window and pecks his face.; Ishboo sneaks his way past a security guard in order to sit in the audience for Blackstreet.; Ishboo introduces musical guest: Blackstreet – "Love's In Need".
12	12	"Zhané"	April 8, 1995	111
Green Room-The Interview: A teen magazine called Teenerific interview Kenan & Josh.; When Earboy Met Sally: Earboy gets a gold watch from Ross Perot to give to Sally (Alisa) to get her to on a date with him. Unfortunately, Four Eyes has a crush on him.; Vital Information with Lori Beth Denberg; The Raffle: Kel & Alisa do a raffle to give weird and unwanted prizes to the audience.; The Spelling Bee; Lemonade Scammer introduces musical guest: Zhané – "Shame".
13	13	"Usher"	April 15, 1995	112
Green Room – The Limbo Contest: The cast members have a limbo contest to see who gets to dump Kevin in a tub of yogurt.; Mavis & Clavis must land a plane but they won't do it if they don't get "diet cola and dem honey-roasted nuts".; Vital Information with Lori Beth Denberg; Miss Fingerly vs. Mr. Hi-Tech: Miss Fingerly's old fashioned ways of teaching run afoul of Mr. Hi-Tech, a student with all of the latest gadgets. Needless to say, trouble soon arises.; Roseanne Aerobics: Comedian Roseanne (Katrina) comes to an aerobics class to teach exercise her way.; Lost & Found; Mavis and Clavis introduce musical guest: Usher – "Think of You".; Mavis & Clavis go backstage with Usher.
14	14	"A Few Good Men"	April 22, 1995	113
Green Room – Audience Q & A: The audience get to ask the cast questions, which are all weird and incredibly strange. In the end, the cast sing "Eat On", a parody of "Keep On" by The Brady Bunch.; Good Burgalar vs. Superdude: Superdude comes to Good Burger to stop a robber.; Vital Information with Lori Beth Denberg; Miss Fingerly vs. The Class Clown: Miss Fingerly is having trouble with Schmutz (Kenan), the class clown--who dresses in a full clown costume and plays practical jokes.; Cereal Critics Alan (Kel) & Allen (Josh); Pierre Escargot; Angelique and Alisa argue over which of them will introduce the musical guest.; Katrina introduces musical guest: A Few Good Men – "Young Girl".
15	15	"Aftermath featuring Kel Mitchell"	April 29, 1995	114
Green Room – The Party: The cast members are throwing a huge party in the Green Room. Whenever Kevin and the producer come in, though, they scramble to hide their party goods.; Surprise Marty: His friends and family are throwing a surprise party for him, but every surprise (e.g. Dan Schneider impersonating Elvis) just causes Marty to faint.; Urkel's Holiday Hits; Vital Information with Lori Beth Denberg; Coach Kreeton Teaches Volleyball; Miss Fingerly in "Do You Do That at Home?": Miss Fingerly is annoyed by a rude student (Angelique). She tells her that at school, she should behave the way she does at home. The next day Ms. Fingerly comes into the room and sees her student in a bathrobe, sitting in a recliner and getting cable hooked up.; Action League Now!: "Stinky on Ice"; The whole cast introduce musical guest: Aftermath featuring Kel Mitchell – "Chillin'".

== See also ==
- All That
- List of All That episodes
