= Soulschool =

Studio album by Monteco
- Released: September 12, 1995
- Genre: R&B
- Length: 50:01
- Label: MCA
- Producer: Chris Stokes

Monteco chronology
| Soulschool (1995) | Monteco (1997) |

Singles from Soulschool
- 1. "Is It Me?" Released: March 7, 1995; 2. "Call It What You Want" Released: 1995; 3. "Down to the Bone" Released: 1995

Professional ratings
Review scores
| Source | Rating |
|---|---|
| AllMusic | 4/5 stars |

Soulschool is the debut studio album by American contemporary R&B singer Monteco, released September 12, 1995 via MCA Records. It did not chart in the United States; however, the lead single "Is It Me?" peaked at #32 on the Billboard R&B chart.

== Track listing ==
All music is composed by Chris Stokes.

| No. | Title | Writer(s) | Length |
|---|---|---|---|
| 1. | "Intro" | | 1:17 |
| 2. | "Is It Me?" | Kelli Ball; Chris Stokes | 4:15 |
| 3. | "Call It What You Want" | Chris Stokes; Frank G. | 3:51 |
| 4. | "Round & Round" | Claudio Cueni; Chris Stokes | 5:37 |
| 5. | "Summerday" ( (Note: "Summerday" contains a sample of "Daylight" as performed by RAMP.)) | Ivan May; Chris Stokes | 4:06 |
| 6. | "Good Thing" | Chris Stokes; Dean Wakatsuki | 4:40 |
| 7. | "Do You Right" | Chris Stokes | 4:23 |
| 8. | "Down to the Bone" | Rodney Day; Joi Marshall | 4:17 |
| 9. | "Never Ending Love" | Claudio Cueni; Chris Stokes | 4:37 |
| 10. | "Be with You" | Claudio Cueni; Chris Stokes | 4:32 |
| 11. | "Something" | Ivan May; Chris Stokes | 3:52 |
| 12. | "Is It Me?" (featuring Immature) | Kelli Ball; Lamonte Lassiter; Chris Stokes | 4:34 |
| Total length: | | | 50:01 |
