= Reality (Smooth album) =

Studio album by Smooth
- Released: March 10, 1998
- Recorded: 1997–1998
- Genre: R&B
- Length: 61:37
- Label: Perspective Records
- Producer: Chris Stokes, Jimmy Jam and Terry Lewis, Lance Alexander & prof. t., Claudio Cueni, Brion James, James Strong, Atron Gregory, Ephraim Galloway, Smooth, Sean "The Mystro" Mather

Smooth chronology
Smooth (1995)	Reality (1998)	What? (2003)

Professional ratings
Review scores
Source	Rating
AllMusic	4/5 stars
USA Today	3/4 stars

Reality is the fourth album by the American R&B singer Smooth. It was released on March 10, 1998, through Perspective Records, and contained production from Chris Stokes and the production duo Jimmy Jam and Terry Lewis. It was her first album for Perspective.

Reality peaked at No. 48 on the Top R&B/Hip-Hop Albums. It peaked at No. 32 on the Top Heatseekers.

The album contained Smooth's biggest hit, "Strawberries", which peaked at No. 49 on the Billboard Hot 100 and No. 17 on the Hot R&B/Hip-Hop Singles & Tracks.

== Critical reception ==
AllMusic wrote that "while the songwriting isn't always compelling, the producers give Smooth a rich instrumental backdrop that allows her to emphasize her charisma, and the result is her best record to date."

== Track listing ==
1. "Strawberries" (Lance Alexander, Tony Tolbert, Juanita Stokes)– 5:39
2. "Don't Sleep" (Chris Stokes, Douglas Coleman, Juanita Stokes, Herbert Crawford) – 4:29
3. "We Funk too Quick" (Juanita Stokes, Brion James, Chris Stokes) – 4:00
4. "Anything I Like" (Chris Stokes, Brion James, Juanita Stokes) – 4:36
5. "Do Ya" (James Strong, Juanita Stokes) – 4:20
6. "Wishing Well" (Chris Stokes, Brion James, Juanita Stokes) – 4:08
7. "He Thinks She Don't Know" (Chris Stokes, Claudio Cueni, Juanita Stokes, Tom Baker)– 3:57
8. "It's On" (James Harris III, Terry Lewis, Juanita Stokes, Al Green) – 4:00
9. "I'm in Love" (Chris Stokes, Claudio Cueni, Juanita Stokes) – 4:26
10. "Willing to Fight" (James Harris III, Terry Lewis, Juanita Stokes, James Wright)– 5:22
11. "You Said You Love Me" (Ephraim Galloway, Juanita Stokes) – 4:37
12. "Loving You" (Chris Stokes, Sean Mather, Kelli Ball, Juanita Stokes) – 3:52
13. "Reality" (Chris Stokes, Brion James, Juanita Stokes) – 2:58
14. "Strawberries" (Computer Love Remix Featuring Shaquille O'Neal, Roger Troutman) (Lance Alexander, Tony Tolbert, Juanita Stokes, Shirley Murdock, Larry Troutman, Roger Troutman) – 5:28

== Samples ==
- "Strawberries" contains a sample of "Where There is Love", as performed by Patrice Rushen
- "It's On" contains a sample of "Rhymes", as performed by Al Green
- "Loving You" contains samples of "Saturday Love", as performed by Cherrelle and "Riding High", as performed by Faze-O
- "Strawberries (Computer Love Remix)" contains a sample of "Computer Love", as performed by Zapp

== Personnel ==
- Keyboards: Lance Alexander, Claudio Cueni, Jimmy Jam, James "Big Jim" Wright, Brion James, Steve Jones, James Strong, Herbert Crawford
- Drum Programming: Brion James, Lance Alexander, Alex Richbourg, Afshin Jazayeri, James Strong, Douglas Coleman
- Guitar: Mike Scott, Brion James
- Organ: James "Big Jim" Wright
- Piano: James "Big Jim" Wright
- Background Vocals: Smooth, Tony Tolbert, Jamecia Bennett
- Executive Producers: Henley "Jr." Regisford, Chris Stokes, Wanda Stokes-Withers, Ketrina "Taz" Askew
- Recording engineers: Steve Hodge, Douglas Coleman, Susan Hernon, Claudio Cueni, Xavier Smith, Tom Baker
- Mixing: Steve Hodge, Xavier Smith, Douglas Coleman, Claudio Cueni, Tom Baker, Dave Rideau
- Mastering: Brian Gardner
- Photography: Kate Garner
- Art direction & design: Greg Ross
