= Bebe's Kids =

1992 film by Bruce W. Smith

- Theatrical release poster
- Directed by: Bruce W. Smith
- Screenplay by: Reginald Hudlin
- Based on: Bebe's Kids by Robin Harris
- Produced by: Reginald Hudlin; Willard Carroll; Thomas L. Wilhite
- Starring: Faizon Love; Nell Carter; Myra J.; Vanessa Bell Calloway; Tone Lōc; Wayne Collins; Jonell Green; Marques Houston
- Edited by: Lynne Southerland; Documentary segment: Tim Ryder
- Music by: John Barnes
- Production companies: Hyperion Studio; Hudlin Bros.
- Distributed by: Paramount Pictures
- Release date: July 31, 1992
- Running time: 72 minutes
- Country: United States
- Language: English
- Budget: $10 million
- Box office: $8.4 million

Bebe's Kids (/ˈbeɪbeɪ/ BAY-bay; also marketed as Robin Harris' Bebe's Kids) is a 1992 American adult animated comedy film produced by Hyperion Studio for Paramount Pictures. Directed by Bruce W. Smith in his directorial debut, it is based on a stand-up routine created by comedian Robin Harris, which described taking a group of unruly children to Disneyland as a favor for a friend.

Harris died two years prior to the film's release; in the film, he is voiced by Faizon Love in his acting debut. As the first animated film to feature an entirely African-American main cast, it co-stars Vanessa Bell Calloway, Marques Houston, Nell Carter and Tone Lōc.

Originally released theatrically on July 31, 1992, by Paramount Pictures, Bebe's Kids was a critical and commercial failure. Although its animation was praised, critics found fault with its story, screenplay and humor. Bebe's Kids grossed $8.4 million at the box office against a budget of $10 million, becoming a box office bomb. Despite this, it has developed a cult following, and spawned a video game of the same name two years later.

== Plot ==
The original stand-up routine by Robin Harris is shown in a brief live-action segment before an animated version of Harris woefully recounts his troubles to a blind bartender. He traces his problems back to Jamika, a woman he met at a funeral.

Outside the wake, Robin approaches Jamika and asks her out. Jamika picks up her mild-mannered son, Leon, from the babysitter and invites Robin to come along with her to the amusement park, Fun World, which Robin agrees to.

The next day, Jamika introduces Robin to the three children of her hedonistic friend Bebe - consisting of LaShawn, Kahlil, and the smooth-talking baby Pee-Wee.

All six travel to Fun World, but are confronted by security at the entrance, and warned they are being watched. Upon entering the park, Bebe's kids are set loose and promptly wreak havoc. Robin's disastrous outing is further disrupted by a chance encounter with his ex-wife, Dorothea, and her portly best friend, Vivian.

After going on a couple of rides with Bebe's kids, Robin and Jamika let them go off on their own again as they attempt to enjoy a ride through the Tunnel of Love, where Jamika commends Robin for his endurance. While Robin and Jamika spend time together on their own, Leon tries to fit in with Bebe's kids but is at first unsuccessful, although they allow him to tag along. The kids then resume their mischief until they are caught by security. However, they escape and convince a group of other free-range children to spread the chaos.

Meanwhile, Dorothea and Vivian attempt to sabotage the growing relationship between Robin and Jamika but are thwarted by Robin.

Elsewhere, in an abandoned building, Leon and Bebe's kids finds animatronic versions of the Terminator, Abraham Lincoln and Richard Nixon, and are put on trial. The Terminator animatronic acts as judge who decides whether their antics are worth sending to the electric chair, while Lincoln acts as the Bebe's kids' defense attorney with "Nixon" as the prosecutor. Leon proves his courage through a rap that not only wins their freedom but also gains him Bebe's kids' respect. They celebrate their victory by stealing a pirate ship and crashing it into a recreation of the RMS Titanic, taking the crew and passengers hostage, including Dorothea and Vivian.

Robin and Jamika finally leave Fun World, with the park ultimately crumbling in destruction through Robin's rearview mirror. When a cop passes, Robin tries to get his attention, but Bebe's kids scare the officer away.

Robin drops Bebe's kids off at their apartment, where he sees how they really live. Bebe, as usual, is nowhere to be seen, and has left a note on the empty refrigerator, expecting Jamika to feed the kids. Sad to see Robin go, Bebe's kids bid him an emotional goodbye, but not before he gives them what money he has left so they can order themselves a pizza.

At the bar, Robin has a change of heart and returns to hang out with Bebe's kids a little while longer, despite all the mayhem they've caused. The kids force him to take them all to Las Vegas, where everybody flees in terror when they recognize the kids. Pee-Wee finds and pulls a plug out of a socket, causing a citywide blackout.

== Voice cast ==
- Faizon Love as Robin Harris
  - Harris makes a live-action appearance in the opening scene.
- Vanessa Bell Calloway as Jamika
- Marques Houston as Kahlil
- Jonell Green as LaShawn
- Tone Lōc as Pee-Wee
- Wayne Collins Jr. as Leon
- Myra J. as Dorothea
- Nell Carter as Vivian
- Phillip Glasser as Winthrop "Opie"
- Louie Anderson as Security Guard #1
- Tom Everett as Security Guard #2
- X-Ray as Security Guard #3
- Rich Little as President Nixon
- Amy Rose Seville as Brooke
- John Witherspoon as Card Player #1
- Chino "Fats" Williams as Card Player #2
- Rodney Winfield as Card Player #3
- George Wallace as Card Player #4

== Production ==
The film was originally conceptualized by Reginald Hudlin as a live action television comedy series. Following Harris' death in 1990, the film was restructured into an animated feature film. After several unsuccessful attempts at pitching to other studios, Paramount picked up the film, looking to expand their animation portfolio with Hyperion Studios. Then-CEO Brandon Tartikoff was able to bring Bébé's Kids over from NBC once he joined Paramount as chairman.

== Original stand-up version ==
In the original act, Robin's prospective girlfriend, Jamika, asks him to take her and her son to Disneyland, but when he agrees, she shows up with four children, three of whom are the neglected children of her friend, Bebe, whom Jamika refuses to judge or discipline.

Bebe's kids are misbehaved truants and violent troublemakers, over whom Jamika does not attempt to exercise any control. They terrorize park staff, cut off Donald Duck's feet to use for swimming, try to steal Robin's 8-track while he's listening to it, and make a general menace of themselves, literally destroying the park. Their reputation is so bad that even the police refuse to mess with them. In the second act, Robin is picked up from a bar by Jamika and the kids. The kids force him to take them to Las Vegas. Pee-Wee pulls out a power cord and the city's power goes out.

== Music ==
Robin Harris' Bebe's Kids: Music from the Motion Picture Soundtrack

Soundtrack album by Various artists
- Released: 1992
- Genres: Hip hop, rap, funk, soul
- Length: 66:39
- Labels: Capitol, Virgin
- Producer: various artists

No.	Title	Writer(s)	Artist	Length
1.	"Tear It Up (On Our Worst Behavior)"	Chris Stokes, Christopher Stewart, Jermaine Dupri, Thaddis Harrell, Marquis Dair	Immature	3:26
2.	"I Got It Bad Y'all"	Roger McBride, Eric Brooks, Mark Jordan	King Tee	3:28
3.	"I Got the 411"	Taura Taylor-Mendoza, Bajita Ivie, Humphrey Riley	Urban Prop	5:04
4.	"It Takes Two to Make a Party"	Max Elliott, Tyrone Wilkins, Howard Thompson, Michael Bennett	Maxi Priest featuring Little Shawn	3:56
5.	"66 Mello"	George Worrell Jr., William Collins, Claydes Smith, George Clinton Jr., Dennis Thomas, George Brown, Robert Mickens, Robert Bell, Ronald Bell, James Phillips, Michael O. Johnson, Otha Nash, Richard Westfield	New Version of Soul	4:57
6.	"Oh No!"	Todd Thomas, Timothy Barnwell	Arrested Development	4:56
7.	"Straight Jackin'"	Reginald Hudlin, Eric Sadler, William Stephney, Chris Champion, Michael Berrin	Bebe's Kids (Wayne Collins, Jonell Green, Marques Houston) featuring Tone Lōc	2:49
8.	"Freedom Song"	Hudlin, Allen Hayes, Stephney, Champion, Berrin	Bebe's Kids (Wayne Collins, Jonell Green, Marques Houston) featuring Tone Lōc	2:44
9.	"I Ain't Havin' It"	Hudlin, Sadler, Hayes	Faizon Love	3:25
10.	"Standing on the Rock of Love"	John Barnes, William Griffin, Cynthia Mizelle	Aretha Franklin	5:04
11.	"Your Love Keeps Working on Me"	Joey Diggs, Barnes, Ronald White	Joey Diggs	4:56
12.	"Can't Say Goodbye"	Barnes, Griffin, White	The O'Jays	5:18
13.	"Deeper"	Barnes, Griffin	Ronald Isley	5:49
14.	"All My Love"	William Miller Jr., Carole Stevens	Phil Perry featuring Renee Diggs	6:18
15.	"I Want to Thank You for Your Love"	Barnes, Griffin, White, Wanda Vaughn	The Emotions	4:29

== Release ==
The original theatrical and home video release were preceded by the short Itsy Bitsy Spider.

=== Critical reception ===
The film received mixed to negative reviews from critics. Rita Kempley of The Washington Post said Bebe's Kids "may not be remarkably drawn or brilliantly conceived" but was at its best when focused on Robin's character, however she disliked the portrayal of white people as "moronic, fascistic, greedy and boneheaded". The L.A. Times described Bebe's Kids as "an imaginative delight." On Rotten Tomatoes, it has a 36% "rotten" score based on 11 reviews, with an average rating of 4.4/10.

=== Box office ===
In its opening weekend, the film ranked seventh with $3,010,987, behind Death Becomes Her, Honey, I Blew Up the Kid, Mo' Money, A League of Their Own, Buffy the Vampire Slayer and Sister Act. Its final domestic total is $8,442,162.

=== Accolades ===
Bebe's Kids was nominated for an Annie Award for Best Animated Feature at the 20th Annie Awards, losing to Beauty and the Beast.

=== Home media ===
The film was released on VHS by Paramount Home Video on March 10, 1993, as well as on Laserdisc on March 17. It was then released on DVD on October 5, 2004. It was also previously included in the Warner Archive Collection. Paramount reissued the film on DVD in May 2020. On July 12, 2022, the film was released on Blu-ray for the first time.

== Video game ==
The film was later adapted into a video game for the Super NES in 1994.

== Popular culture ==
In 2022, the film inspired a psychological thriller trailer for short film 'Bebe' to be created, written and produced by Marquis Boone of Marquis Boone Enterprises and later released the full 20-minute feature in 2024. The idea was in a wave of parody trailers over YouTube and social media of cult-classic TV shows/film to turn into 'what if it was rebooted more dramatic or darker and sinister?'. Such parody trailers during this time period was Family Matters (as 'Urkel', seen on SNL); Martin (as 'Pam & Tommy: A Detroit Love Story' created by Bobby Huntley Films); and The Fresh Prince of Bel-Air, (as Bel-Air short film parody trailer created by Morgan Cooper, which notably went on to be picked up and produced by Peacock as a reboot/reimagining of the same name), but also had another darker psychological thriller trailer from the same show titled 'Auntie' (created by Bobby Huntley films).
