= Smooth (Smooth album) =

Studio album by Smooth
- Released: August 1, 1995
- Recorded: 1994–1995
- Genre: Hip hop; R&B
- Length: 58:12
- Label: Jive
- Producer: Chris Stokes; D-Flow Production Squad; James Strong; K. Fingers; Larry "Rock" Campbell

Smooth chronology
You Been Played (1993)	Smooth (1995)	Reality (1998)

Singles from Smooth
- 1. "Mind Blowin'" Released: 1995; 2. "It's Summertime (Let It Get into U)" Released: 1995; 3. "Love Groove (Groove with You)" Released: 1996; 4. "Undercover Lover" Released: 1996

Professional ratings
Review scores
Source	Rating
AllMusic	3/5 stars
The Source	3.5/5 stars

Smooth is the third studio album by American singer and rapper Smooth. It was released on August 1, 1995, via TNT Recordings and Jive Records. The album was produced by Chris Stokes, Larry "Rock" Campbell, K. Fingers, D-Flow Production Squad, and James Strong, with Atron Gregory serving as executive producer. It features a guest appearance from 2Pac.

The album reached number 35 on the Top R&B/Hip-Hop Albums chart and number 17 on the Top Heatseekers charts in the US, and number 18 on the Official Hip Hop and R&B Albums Chart in the UK.

It was supported with four charted singles: "Mind Blowin'", "It's Summertime (Let It Get into U)", "Love Groove (Groove with You)" and "Undercover Lover". Its lead single, "Mind Blowin'", peaked at No. 75 on the Billboard Hot 100 and No. 36 on the UK singles chart. The song "Good Stuff" was included in 1996 Original Gangstas: The Soundtrack.

== Track listing ==
No.	Title	Writer(s)	Producer(s)	Length
1.	"Mind Blowin'"	Juanita Carter; Larry Louis Campbell; Craig Simpkins; Maurice White; Ernie Isley; Marvin Isley; O'Kelly Isley Jr.; Ronald Isley; Rudolph Isley; Chris Jasper	Larry "Rock" Campbell; K. Fingers (co.)	4:16
2.	"It's Summertime (Let It Get into U)"	J. Carter; Campbell; Simpkins	Larry "Rock" Campbell	4:03
3.	"Way Back When"	J. Carter; Campbell; Wayne Williams; James Stanley Carter	Larry "Rock" Campbell	4:37
4.	"Blowin' Up My Pager"	J. Carter; Christopher Brian Stokes	Chris Stokes	4:36
5.	"P.Y.T. (Playa Young Thugs)" (featuring 2Pac)	J. Carter; Tupac Shakur; Gregory Jacobs; James Strong	D-Flow Production Squad; James Strong (voc.)	4:34
6.	"Swing It to the Left Side"	J. Carter; Jacobs	D-Flow Production Squad; Smooth (voc.)	4:21
7.	"Good Stuff"	J. Carter; Stokes	Chris Stokes	4:52
8.	"Love Groove (Groove with You)"	J. Carter; Simpkins	K. Fingers	4:17
9.	"Jeeps 'N' Benzos"	J. Carter; Stokes; William Griffin; Eric Barrier	Chris Stokes	3:37
10.	"Ghetto Style"	J. Carter; Simpkins	K. Fingers	4:45
11.	"Undercover Lover"	J. Carter; Strong	James Strong	6:09
12.	"Let It Go"	J. Carter; Stokes	Chris Stokes	3:55
13.	"Mind Blowin'" (Non Rap, All-Singing Version)	J. Carter; Campbell; Simpkins; White; E. Isley; M. Isley; Isley Jr.; R. Isley; Jasper	Larry "Rock" Campbell; K. Fingers (co.)	4:10
Total length:				58:12

Sample credits

- Tracks 1 and 13 contain a portion of the composition "Brazilian Rhyme" written by Maurice White, and a sample of "For the Love of You" written by Ernie Isley, Marvin Isley, O'Kelly Isley Jr., Ronald Isley, Rudolph Isley and Chris Jasper and performed by the Isley Brothers.
- Track 2 contains a portion of the composition "Funkin' for Jamaica (N.Y.)" written by Thomas Fredrick Browne and Thomassina Carrollyne "Toni" Smith.
- Track 3 contains a portion of the composition "Help Is on the Way" written by James S. Carter.
- Track 8 contains a sample of "Places & Spaces" written by Larry Mizell and Alphonso Mizell and performed by Donald Byrd.
- Track 9 contains samples of "Summertime" written by Will Smith, Craig Simpkins, Lamar Hula Mahone, Alton Taylor, Robert Mickens, Robert Bell, George Brown, Richard Westfield, Dennis Thomas, Claydes Charles Smith and Ronald Bell and performed by DJ Jazzy Jeff & the Fresh Prince, and "My Melody" written and performed by Eric B. & Rakim.
- Track 10 contains a sample of "Warm Summer Night" written by Nile Rodgers and Bernard Edwards and performed by Chic.
- Track 12 contains a portion of the composition "Love T.K.O." written by Cecil Womack, Linda Womack and Gip Noble.

== Charts ==
Chart (1995)	Peak position
UK R&B Albums (OCC)	18
US Top R&B/Hip-Hop Albums (Billboard)	35
US Heatseekers Albums (Billboard)	17
