= Is It Me? =

1995 single by Monteco

Single by Monteco featuring Immature

from the album Soulschool
- Released: March 7, 1995
- Genre: R&B
- Length: 4:34 (album version); 3:51 (single edit)
- Label: MCA
- Songwriters: Chris Stokes; Kelli Ball; Lamonte Lassiter

Monteco singles chronology
"Is It Me?" (1995)	"Call It What You Want" (1995)

Immature singles chronology
"I Don't Mind" (1995)	"Is It Me?" (1995)	"Feel the Funk" (1995)

"Is It Me?" is a song performed by American contemporary R&B singer Monteco, issued as the first single from his debut studio album Soulschool. The song features vocals from American contemporary R&B group IMx (then known as Immature); and it was Monteco's only song to chart on Billboard, peaking at #32 on the R&B chart in 1995.

== Chart positions ==
Chart (1995)	Peak position
US Hot R&B/Hip-Hop Singles & Tracks (Billboard)	32
