= Mind Blowin' (Smooth song) =

Single by Smooth

from the album Smooth
- B-side: "Ghetto Style"
- Released: May 15, 1995
- Recorded: 1995
- Genre: Hip hop
- Length: 4:16
- Label: Jive
- Songwriter: Juanita Stokes
- Producers: Art & Rhythm

Smooth singles chronology
"You Been Played" (1993)	"Mind Blowin'" (1995)	"Strawberries" (1997)

"Mind Blowin'" is the lead single from Smooth's eponymous third album.

== Track listing ==
1. "Mind Blowin'" (LP Version)- 4:16
2. "Mind Blowin'" (Kenny 'Smoove' Illmatic Mix)- 4:26
3. "Mind Blowin'" (Mr. Lee's Radio Chant)- 4:30
4. "Mind Blowin'" (Radio / Video Version)- 3:56
5. "Mind Blowin'" (Kenny 'Smoove' Laid Back Mix)- 4:00
6. "Ghetto Style" (LP Version)- 4:32

== Charts ==
Chart	Peak position
US Billboard Hot 100	75
US Hot Dance Music/Maxi-Singles Sales	36
US Hot Rap Singles	7
US R&B / Hip-Hop	31
