= You Been Played =

Studio album by Smooth
- Released: August 24, 1993
- Recorded: 1993
- Genre: Hip hop
- Length: 48:39
- Label: Jive Records
- Producer: Chris Stokes, Juanita Stokes

Smooth chronology
Smooth & Legit (1990)	You Been Played (1993)	Smooth (1995)

You Been Played is an album by Smooth, who had previously released her debut album under the name MC Smooth. It was released on August 24, 1993 through Jive Records and was produced by Juanita Stokes and her brother, Chris Stokes. The album reached No. 77 on the Top R&B/Hip-Hop Albums chart.

== Track listing ==
1. "Ready or Not"- 4:20
2. "Female Mac"- 3:55
3. "You Been Played"- 4:20
4. "Lovin' You is Simple"- 4:12
5. "You Are Through"- 4:08
6. "Let's Not Pimp"- 4:36
7. "You're Slippin'"- 3:39
8. "Get Inside My?"- 4:22
9. "Hey You"- 3:32
10. "Talk Too Much"- 4:10
11. "Dog You"- 4:05
12. "Hump and Dump"- 3:20
