= Stay the Night (IMx song) =

Single by IMx

from the album Introducing IMx
- Released: 1999
- Recorded: 1998
- Genre: R&B, hip hop
- Label: MCA
- Songwriters: Chris Stokes, Jerome Jones
- Producers: Chris Stokes, Tony Isaac, Platinum Status

IMx singles chronology
"Extra, Extra" (1998)	"Stay the Night" (1999)	"In & Out of Love" (2000)

"Stay the Night" is the lead single from IMx's fifth album, Introducing IMx.

== Commercial performance ==
"Stay the Night" reached No. 23 on the Billboard Hot 100 singles chart and No. 20 on the Hot R&B/Hip-Hop Singles chart in late 1999. Most of the chart performance was caused by its sales. It landed in the top-ten of the Hot 100's component chart for sales (#9) while barely making the top 50 of the R&B/Hip-Hop Airplay chart (#46). It was the group's most successful single as IMx, becoming their third single to earn a gold certification, achieving the feat on December 23, 1999, a little over two months after its release.

== Music video ==
The video pays a homage to TLC's video "No Scrubs" (released several months prior) and Michael Jackson and Janet Jackson's video "Scream". The video was shot on July 31, 1999 and it begins with the boys dancing in a white room, right behind them it has the IMx logo on the wall. Marques start singing his verse while walking down the long hallway and seen on the TV screens while Young Rome and LDB were riding floating scooters. Marques is seen riding a floating scooter while singing the second verse. Young Rome is seen in a blue room. The next scene shows the boys playing basketball and trying to impress women. Alexis Fields and Shar Jackson make cameos. Fields would later work with IMx in House Party 4: Down to the Last Minute. Houston and Fields would work again later in the 2007 horror film, Somebody Help Me

== Charts ==
=== Weekly charts ===
Weekly chart performance for "Stay the Night"
Chart (1999–2000)	Peak position
Netherlands (Dutch Top 40)	9
Netherlands (Single Top 100)	12
US Billboard Hot 100	23
US Hot R&B/Hip-Hop Songs (Billboard)	20
US Rhythmic Airplay (Billboard)	9

=== Year-end charts ===
2000 year-end chart performance for "Stay the Night"
Chart (2000)	Position
Netherlands (Dutch Top 40)	96

== Certifications ==
Certifications for "Stay the Night"
Region	Certification	Certified units/sales
United States (RIAA)	Gold	500,000^{^}
^{^} Shipments figures based on certification alone.
