= Strawberries (song) =

1997 single by Smooth

Single by Smooth

from the album Reality
- B-side: "Strawberries" (Remix)
- Released: 1997
- Recorded: 1997
- Genre: R&B
- Length: 5:37
- Label: Perspective
- Songwriter: Juanita Stokes
- Producers: Lance Alexander, Prof T.

Smooth singles chronology
"Mind Blowin'" (1995)	"Strawberries" (1997)	"Sensitive" (2003)

"Strawberries" is the lead single released from Smooth's fourth and final album, Reality. The lyrics are about eating strawberries with Hennessy with sexual overtones. The song became the most successful of Smooth's career, making it to 49 on the Billboard Hot 100 and 17 on the Hot R&B/Hip-Hop Singles & Tracks. This song contains a sample from "Where There Is Love" by Patrice Rushen.

Two remixes for the song were made. The more popular Computer remix was produced by Darren "Nitro" Clowers and featured NBA star Shaquille O'Neal and Roger Troutman. The other remix was produced by Marc Kinchen and featured Smooth's labelmate, Rufas Blaq.

== Track listing ==
A-side

1. "Strawberries" (Computer Love Remix)- 5:33
2. "Strawberries" (Computer Love Remix Instrumental)- 5:31
3. "Strawberries"- 5:37

B-side

1. "Strawberries" (Marc Kinchen Remix)- 5:16
2. "Strawberries" (Marc Kinchen Remix Instrumental)- 5:15
3. "Strawberries" (A Capella)- 5:29

== Charts ==
=== Weekly charts ===
Chart (1997–1998)	Peak position
US Billboard Hot 100	49
US Hot R&B/Hip-Hop Songs (Billboard)	17

=== Year-end charts ===
Chart (1998)	Position
US Hot R&B/Hip-Hop Songs (Billboard)	61

== See also ==
- List of strawberry topics
