= Smooth & Legit =

Studio album by MC Smooth
- Released: 1990
- Recorded: 1989–1990
- Genre: Hip hop
- Label: Crush Music
- Producer: Chris Stokes, Arabian Prince

MC Smooth chronology
Smooth & Legit (1990)	You Been Played (1993)

Professional ratings
Review scores
Source	Rating
AllMusic	2/5 stars

Smooth & Legit is the debut album by Smooth, known as MC Smooth at the time. It was released in 1990 by independent label Crush Music and produced by her brother Chris Stokes and former N.W.A member Arabian Prince. The album reached No. 72 on the Billboard Top R&B Albums chart.

== Track listing ==
1. "Smooth & Legit"- 4:19
2. "Intro: Vocals"- 0:19
3. "You Gotta Be Real"- 4:01
4. "Intro: Vocals"- 0:14
5. "Who's Smooth the M.C."- 3:15
6. "Take It from the Top"- 3:39
7. "24/7"- 2:45
8. "Intro: Vocals"- 0:17
9. "The Dope Man"- 3:45
10. "Intro: Vocals"- 0:13
11. "I'm an Individual"- 2:27
12. "Intro: Vocals"- 0:16
13. "Where Is the Money"- 4:09
14. "Blow Your Whistle"- 4:24
15. "You Reap What You Sow"- 3:26
16. "Intro: Vocals"- 0:15
17. "It Could Have Been You"- 3:24
18. "Clap Your Hands"- 3:55
19. "You Think You Want Some"- 3:44
