= Food for Thought (Young Rome album) =

Studio album by Young Rome
- Released: June 22, 2004
- Studio: MaddHouse Recording Studio, Los Angeles, CA
- Genre: Hip hop, R&B, pop rap
- Length: 54:12
- Label: TUG, Universal
- Producer: Executive: Ketrina Askew, Omari Grandberry, Jerome Jones, Marques Houston, Henley Regisford Jr., Rufus Blaq, Tony Scott, Chris Stokes, Juanita "Smooth" Stokes; J. Brown, D.O.M., Felli Fel, Gav Beat, Gerard Harmon, Anderson "Pit Boss" Johnson, Ruk T. Nyce, Brandon "Bird" Parrott, Mike "Wrekka" Risko, Keith Wilkins

Young Rome chronology
Food for Thought (2004)	Round 1 (2006)

Food for Thought is the only studio album by American rapper and singer Jerome Jones of the group Immature/IMx (credited as Young Rome). The album was released in the U.S. on June 22, 2004. Two singles were released from the album: "After Party" and "Freaky". The album features guest appearances by Omarion, YoungBloodZ, and fellow Immature/IMx member Marques Houston, among others.

== Background ==
Young Rome's opinion of this album is that, "It's far from what Immature did. It's more mature—more about my personal life and what I've been through. I sing about the ups and downs of being in the group, of what's happening with my family and going through stuff. This album shows all of me—the adversity and everything else."

== Critical reception ==
Professional ratings
Review scores
Source	Rating
AllMusic	2/5 stars
Blender Magazine	3/5 stars

AllMusic editor Andy Kellman called the album a "rather defiant move and a striking attempt to leave his kid-pop past in the dust [...] Beyond a couple OK singles, the album lacks depth, and it's only consistent for the fact that it's one-dimensional throughout."

== Commercial performance ==
In the United States, Food for Thought debuted at number 98 on the Billboard 200 and peaked at number 32 on Billboard's Top R&B/Hip-Hop Albums.

== Track listing ==
1. "Intro" – 2:06
2. "Freaky" (featuring Guerilla Black) ^{1} – 3:56
3. "I Don't Care" (featuring YoungBloodZ) – 5:01
4. "After Party" (featuring Omarion & Marques Houston) ^{1} – 4:14
5. "In My Bedroom (Interlude)" – 2:46
6. "In My Bedroom" (featuring O'Ryan)– 4:22
7. "Crazy Girl" (featuring Rufus Blaq) – 3:26
8. "Sexapade" (featuring Marques Houston and Smooth) – 3:19
9. "2 Step (Intro)" – 0:10
10. "2 Step" – 3:48
11. "Best Days" – 4:14
12. "Clap" (featuring Rufus Blaq)– 3:51
13. "In My Car" – 2:14
14. "Wha Cha Doin' Tonight" (featuring Marques Houston) – 3:54
15. "Look Down on Me" – 2:49

Bonus tracks

16. "Back It Up" – 6:32

== Charts ==
Weekly chart performance for Food for Thought
Chart (2004)	Peak position
US Billboard 200	98
US Top R&B/Hip-Hop Albums (Billboard)	32
