= Natalia Damini =

- Born: Natalia Camurca Carvalho; Fortaleza, Ceará, Brazil
- Genres: Pop, dance, R&B
- Occupations: Singer-songwriter, dancer, actress
- Years active: 2010–present
- Label: Concore Entertainment (2013—present)
- Website: iamnataliadamini.com

Natália Camurça Carvalho, is a singer, songwriter. Born in Fortaleza, Brazil. Natalia Damini started her career at 17 years old with her first single Feeling The Love which became a very popular song in Brazil.

== Career ==
At 18 Natalia moved to São Paulo and released her second single Your Lies which went No. 1 on the international dance sales charts and she was nominated for best dance artist at the Dj Sound Awards. Natalia teamed up with Charve The Don, Concore Entertainment CEO and released her Bad Girl EP which debuted on iTunes Music Pop Charts at No. 32 and then she went on to release her debut album Beautiful in 2014 which reached No. 16 on iTunes Music Pop Charts, the album features Nicki Minaj, Gucci Mane and The Shop Boyz. Natalia also teamed up with Lil Wayne and Rezzo on the single Can't Stop Me. Natalia Damini is the first artist from Brazil to have a major presence in the American music scene and has been featured in some of the biggest publications in music and also graces the cover of numerous magazines. Natalia Damini's single Crazy reached No. 1 in September 2015 on the Billboard Emerging Artists Chart, No. 9 on Billboard Trending 140 and No. 1 on Spotify Top 25 Most Played Songs. Natalia's current single "On The Floor" is No. 1 on DRT Independent Charts and Cashbox Magazine Charts No. 38 on DRT National Charts and Cashbox Magazine Charts. In 2020 Natalia Damini released "Pacemaker" featuring Petey Pablo peak #1 on Digital Radio Chart, debut #36 on Billboard Mainstream Indicator Chart and #50 on Mediabase All Published Top 50 Chart. On March 17, 2023, Damini teamed up with Tito Jackson bringing the Motown and the early Jacksons feel back with a new song "Attitude", and a music video. This collaboration came to be because Damini's manager Charve the Don was also Jackson's long time friend.

== Discography ==
Year	Song
2013	Bad Girl – EP
2017	I Am Natalia Damini – Album
2020	Dami-Nation – EP

== Compilation ==
2016	25 DANCE HITS – Hot Fire ft. Nicki Minaj Dance MIx – Album

== Singles ==
Year	Song
2010	Feelin' The Love
2011	Your Lies
2011	It´s Over
2012	Pisces (Feel The Music)
2013	One More Chance
2013	Bad Girl
2014	Kiss It
2014	Hot Fire feat. Nicki Minaj
2014	Can't Stop Me feat. Lil Wayne, Rezzo
2014	Can't Be Without You feat. Mister Jam
2014	Magic
2015	Give Me The Night
2016	On The Floor
2016	Ate O Chao
2017	Slow
2020	Pacemaker feat. Petey Pablo
2020	Oh Na Na
2022	Elas Gostam
2022	La La La
2023	Attitude feat. Tito Jackson

== Tours ==
- 2011 – 2012 Natalia Damini
- 2013 – Feel The Music
- 2013 – Sublimation Tour
- 2016 – Natalia Damini Tour

== Music videos ==
Year	Song
2011	It's Over
2012	Can't Be Without You feat. Mister Jam
2013	One More Chance
2014	Magic
2015	Give Me The Night
2016	On The Floor
2017	Slow
2020	Pacemaker
2023	Attitude ft. Tito Jackson

== Awards ==
=== Underground Music Awards ===
2015

- Best Female R&B/POP artist
