= Introducing IMx =

Studio album by IMx
- Released: October 26, 1999
- Recorded: 1998–1999
- Genre: R&B
- Label: MCA

IMx chronology
The Journey (1997)	Introducing IMx (1999)	Greatest Hits (2001)

Singles from Introducing IMx
- 1. "Stay The Night" Released: August 23, 1999

Professional ratings
Review scores
Source	Rating
Allmusic	2/5 stars

Introducing IMx is the fifth album by IMx, formerly known as Immature, released on October 26, 1999, on MCA Records. It peaked at #101 on the Billboard 200 album chart and #31 on the Top R&B/Hip-Hop Albums chart. The album featured the hit single, "Stay the Night", which peaked at No. 23 on the Billboard Hot 100. As IMx, it was also their last album on MCA Records.

== Track listing ==
No.	Title	Writer(s)	Producer(s)	Length
1.	"Stay The Night"	Tony "Touch" Isaac, Chris Stokes, Platinum Status, Albert James Vance, Don Davis, Harvey Scales, Kelton Kessee, Lawrence Stephan & Marques Houston	Tony "Touch" Isaac, Chris Stokes & Platinum Status	3:41
2.	"Keep It On The Low (feat. RaRa)"	Jerome Jones, Ketrina "Taz" Askew, Platinum Status, Kelton Kessee, Lawrence Stephan & Marques Houston	Chris Stokes & Platinum Status	3:45
3.	"In & Out Of Love"	Anthem(née Channette Higgens + Chanoah Higgens), Curtis Williams & Vincent Herbert	Curtis Williams & Vincent Herbert	4:30
4.	"Temptations"	Platinum Status, Kelton Kessee, Marques Houston & Lawrence Stephens	Chris Stokes & Platinum Status	4:37
5.	"Trick"	Greg Poree, Jerome Jones, Ketrina "Taz" Askew, Platinum Status, Kelton Kessee & Marques Houston	Chris Stokes & Platinum Status	3:52
6.	"Love Me In A Special Way"	El DeBarge & Platinum Status	Chris Stokes & Platinum Status	4:12
7.	"Old School Love (feat. Smooth)"	Juanita Stokes, Jerome Jones, Ketrina "Taz" Askew, Platinum Status, Kelton Kessee, Marques Houston, Charles Cochran, Mark True & Sam Hogin	Chris Stokes & Platinum Status	4:12
8.	"What I Gotta Do (feat. Chris Buck)"	Jerome Jones, Ketrina "Taz" Askew, Lew Laing, Platinum Status, Kelton Kessee & Marques Houston	Lew Laing, Chris Stokes & Platinum Status	3:45
9.	"Bubbling (feat. RaRa)"	Marc Gordon, "Big Chuck," "Envy 1," "RaRa" & Jerome Jones	Marc Gordon	4:28
10.	"Everytime"	Jerome Jones, Platinum Status, Kelton Kessee, Marques Houston, George Poree & Platinum Status	Chris Stokes & Platinum Status	4:09
11.	"One Last Chance"	Jerome Jones, Platinum Status, Kelton Kessee & Marques Houston	Chris Stokes & Platinum Status	3:24
12.	"Beautiful"	Jerome Jones, Ketrina "Taz" Askew, Platinum Status, Kelton Kessee & Marques Houston	Chris Stokes & Platinum Status	5:16
