= Never Lie =

Single by Immature

from the album Playtyme is Over
- Released: June 21, 1994
- Genre: R&B
- Length: 4:13
- Label: MCA
- Songwriters: Claudio Cueni, Chris Stokes

Immature singles chronology
"I Wanna Know U That Way" (1993)	"Never Lie" (1994)	"Constantly" (1994)

"Never Lie" is a song by American R&B boy band IMx (then known as Immature), issued as the lead single from the group's second album, Playtyme is Over (1994). The song was their biggest hit on the US Billboard Hot 100 and Cash Box Top 100 charts, peaking at numbers five and nine in 1994. It was certified gold on September 29, 1994, and sold 700,000 copies.

== Charts ==
=== Weekly charts ===
Weekly chart performance for "Never Lie"
Chart (1994–1995)	Peak position
Australia (ARIA)	55
US Billboard Hot 100	5
US Hot R&B/Hip-Hop Songs (Billboard)	5
US Mainstream Top 40 (Billboard)	32
US Rhythmic (Billboard)	3
US Cash Box Top 100	9

=== Year-end charts ===
Year-end chart performance for "Never Lie"
Chart (1994)	Position
US Billboard Hot 100	53
US Hot R&B/Hip-Hop Songs (Billboard)	31

== Certifications ==
Certifications for "Never Lie"
Region	Certification	Certified units/sales
United States (RIAA)	Gold	500,000^{^}
^{^} Shipments figures based on certification alone.

== Samples ==
- The song was later sampled in Lil Mosey's track "Kamikaze".
