= I'm Not a Fool =

1997 single by IMx

Single by Immature

from the album The Journey
- Released: August 26, 1997
- Genre: R&B
- Length: 4:30
- Label: MCA
- Songwriters: Chris Stokes; Brion James; Joe Harrington
- Producers: Chris Stokes; Brion James

Immature singles chronology
"Watch Me Do My Thing" (1996)	"I'm Not a Fool" (1997)	"Give Up the Ghost" (1997)

"I'm Not a Fool" is a song performed by IMx (then credited as Immature), issued as the lead single from their fourth studio album The Journey. The song peaked at #69 on the Billboard Hot 100 in 1997.

== Chart positions ==
Chart (1997)	Peak position
US Billboard Hot 100	69
US Hot R&B/Hip-Hop Singles & Tracks (Billboard)	19
