= Constantly (Immature song) =

Single by Immature

from the album Playtyme is Over
- Released: November 22, 1994
- Recorded: 1994
- Genre: R&B
- Length: 5:43 (album version); 4:10 (single edit)
- Label: MCA
- Songwriters: Teron Beal, Delroy Pearson, Jesse Powell, Ian Prince

Immature singles chronology
"Never Lie" (1994)	"Constantly" (1994)	"I Don't Mind" (1995)

Music video
- "Constantly" at VH1.com

"Constantly" is a song by American R&B boy band IMx (then known as Immature), issued as the second single from the group's second album, Playtyme Is Over (1994). The song peaked at numbers 16 and 27 on the US Billboard Hot 100 and Cash Box Top 100 charts in 1994. It was also the group's second consecutive gold single, having been certified on March 28, 1995. The official music video for the song was directed by Steven Blake.

== Charts ==
=== Weekly charts ===
Chart (1994–1995)	Peak position
US Billboard Hot 100	16
US Hot R&B/Hip-Hop Songs (Billboard)	12
US Rhythmic Songs (Billboard)	11
US Cash Box Top 100	27

=== Year-end charts ===
Chart (1995)	Peak position
US Billboard Hot 100	80
