= The Journey (Immature album) =

Studio album by Immature
- Released: September 23, 1997
- Recorded: 1996–1997
- Genre: R&B
- Label: MCA
- Producer: Rodney Jerkins, Chris Stokes

Immature chronology
We Got It (1995)	The Journey (1997)	Introducing IMx (1999)

Singles from The Journey
- 1. "I'm Not a Fool" Released: August 26, 1997; 2. "Give Up the Ghost" Released: September 28, 1997; 3. "Extra, Extra" Released: February 17, 1998

Professional ratings
Review scores
Source	Rating
Allmusic	4/5 stars

The Journey is the fourth album by R&B boy band Immature, released on September 23, 1997, on MCA Records. It peaked at #92 on The Billboard 200 chart and at #20 on the Top R&B/Hip-Hop Albums chart. This would be the last album under the name, Immature before moving to their fifth album in 1999 as IMx.

== Track listing ==
1. "Give Up the Ghost" (featuring Bizzy Bone)
2. "Tamika"
3. "I'm Not a Fool"
4. "Extra, Extra" (featuring Keith Sweat)
5. "Don't Ever Say Never"
6. "24/7"
7. "Can't You See"
8. "Ooh Wee Baby" (featuring Daz Dillinger)
9. "I'll Give You Everything"
10. "I Can't Wait"
11. "Bring Your Lovin' Home"
12. "Where Do We Go"
13. "All Alone"
