= Monteco =

American contemporary R&B singer

- Born: Monteco Turner; September 16, 1978 (age 47); Mississippi, United States
- Origin: New Orleans, Louisiana, United States
- Genres: R&B
- Years active: 1990s
- Labels: MCA; Dynasty

Monteco Turner (born September 16, 1978), known mononymously as Monteco, is an American contemporary R&B singer who was active in the mid 1990s. His first single "Is It Me?" was released in 1995, and features fellow contemporary R&B group IMx (then known as Immature). The song peaked at #32 on the Billboard R&B chart, but Monteco's album to promote the single, Soulschool, failed to chart. Monteco released his eponymous second album independently in 1997; it also failed to chart.

In 2022, Monteco was featured on a song with Marques Houston, “Lay on Me” from Marques Houston’s album titled, Me: Dark Water-EP

== Discography ==
=== Albums ===
| Title | Album details |
|---|---|
| Soulschool | Released: September 12, 1995; Label: MCA; Formats: CD |
| Monteco | Released: August 12, 1997; Label: Dynasty; Formats: CD |

=== Singles ===
| Year | Song | Peak chart positions | Album |
| Year | Song | U.S. R&B | Album |
|---|---|---|---|
| 1995 | "Is It Me?" (featuring Immature) | 32 | Soulschool |
| 1995 | "Call It What You Want" | — | Soulschool |
| 1995 | "Down to the Bone" | — | Soulschool |
| 1997 | "She Get It from Her Mama" | — | Monteco |
