= Tear It Up (On Our Worst Behavior) =

Single by Immature

from the album On Our Worst Behavior and Bebe's Kids
- B-side: "Straight Jackin'"
- Released: 1992
- Genre: R&B
- Length: 3:25
- Label: Virgin
- Songwriters: Chris Stewart; Chris Stokes; Jermaine Dupri; Marquis Dair; Kuk Harrell
- Producers: Chris Stokes; Marquis Dair

Immature singles chronology
| "Tear It Up (On Our Worst Behavior)" (1992) | "Da Munchies" (1992) |

"Tear It Up (On Our Worst Behavior)" is the debut single by IMx (then credited as Immature). The song appeared on the soundtrack to the film Bebe's Kids and was later added to the group's debut studio album On Our Worst Behavior. It peaked at #29 on the Billboard R&B chart in 1992, being the only charted single of the album.

== Chart positions ==
| Chart (1992) | Peak position |
|---|---|
| US Hot R&B/Hip-Hop Singles & Tracks (Billboard) | 29 |
