= Playtyme Is Over =

Studio album by Immature
- Released: August 2, 1994
- Genres: R&B, hip hop soul
- Length: 45:54
- Label: MCA
- Producers: Claudio Cueni; Ian Prince; Del Pearson; Kyle Hudnall; Lathun Grady

Immature chronology
On Our Worst Behavior (1992)	Playtyme Is Over (1994)	We Got It (1995)

Singles from Playtyme Is Over
- 1. "Never Lie" Released: June 21, 1994; 2. "Constantly" Released: November 22, 1994; 3. "I Don't Mind" Released: April 26, 1995

Professional ratings
Review scores
Source	Rating
Allmusic	1.5/5 stars

Playtyme Is Over is the second album by American band Immature, released on August 2, 1994, their first release with MCA. It peaked at 88 on the The Billboard 200 chart and 26 on the Top R&B/Hip-Hop Albums chart. The first single released from the album was "Never Lie," which peaked at number 5 on the Billboard Hot 100 chart, and the second single was "Constantly," which peaked at number 16 on the same chart. The third and final single released was "I Don't Mind", which peaked at number 92 on the Hot 100. It is also the first album to feature their former drummer Kelton "LDB" Kessee.

== Track listing ==
1. "I Don't Mind" (Colin England, Roy "Dog" Pennon) (4:26)
2. "Never Lie" (Claudio Cueni, Chris Stokes) (4:13)
3. "Walk You Home" (Roy "Dog" Pennon, Chris Stokes (3:19)
4. "Constantly" (Teron Beal, Delroy Pearson, Jesse Powell, Ian Prince) (5:43)
5. "Broken Heart" (Claudio Cueni, Chris Stokes, Dean Wakatsuki) (4:16)
6. "Summertime" (Chris Stokes) (3:30)
7. "Nothing But a Party" (Kyle Hudnall, Chris Stokes) (3:32)
8. "Look Into Your Eyes" (Chris Stokes) (3:57)
9. "Sweetest Love" (Lathun Grady, Charles Norris) (3:40)
10. "Just a Little Bit" (Delroy Pearson, Jesse Powell, Ian Prince) (4:42)
11. "I Don't Mind" (The Vibe Mix) (Colin England, Roy "Dog" Pennon) (4:36)

== Singles track listing ==
- Constantly / Never Lie (The Remixes)

US Vinyl, 12"

- A1 Constantly [Funky Street Mix] 3:58
- A2 Constantly [Funky Street Mix Instrumental] 3:59
- B Never Lie [Da' Bomb Street Remix]4:27

== Additional personnel ==
- Taz (vocals)
- Slice Money (various instruments)
- Lathun Grady (background vocals)

== Charts ==
=== Weekly charts ===
Weekly chart performance for Playtyme Is Over
Chart (1994–95)	Peak position
US Billboard 200	88
US Top R&B/Hip-Hop Albums (Billboard)	26

=== Year-end charts ===
1995 year-end chart performance for Playtyme Is Over
Chart (1995)	Position
US Billboard 200	200
US Top R&B/Hip-Hop Albums (Billboard)	73

== Certifications ==
Certifications for Playtyme Is Over
Region	Certification	Certified units/sales
United States (RIAA)	Gold	500,000^{^}
^{^} Shipments figures based on certification alone.
