= We Got It =

1995 studio album by Immature

Studio album by Immature
- Released: December 5, 1995
- Recorded: 1994–1995
- Genres: R&B, hip hop
- Length: 53:33
- Label: MCA
- Producers: Chris Stokes, Davina, Sean "The Mystro" Mather, Mike Dean, Lamonte Lassiter, Claudio Cueni, B Team

Immature chronology
Playtyme Is Over (1994)	We Got It (1995)	The Journey (1997)

Singles from We Got It
- 1. "Feel the Funk" Released: September 22, 1995; 2. "Lover's Groove" Released: October 5, 1995; 3. "Please Don't Go" Released: November 16, 1995; 4. "We Got It" Released: January 9, 1996

Professional ratings
Review scores
Source	Rating
AllMusic	3/5 stars

We Got It is the third studio album by American contemporary R&B group Immature that was released on December 5, 1995. The album featured singles "We Got It" (which sampled Chocolate Milk's 1978 soul hit "Girl Callin'"), "Please Don't Go", "Lover's Groove" and "Feel the Funk" (which also appeared on the soundtrack for the film Dangerous Minds).

In the United States, We Got It peaked at number 76 on the Billboard 200 and number 14 on Billboard's Top R&B/Hip-Hop Albums chart, selling 36,000 copies its first week. On January 1, 1997 the album had sold around 800,000 copies.

== Track listing ==
1. "We Got It" (featuring Smooth) (Juanita Carter, Sean "Mystro" Mather, Chris Stokes) (3:38)
2. "Lover's Groove" (Chris Stokes) (4:03)
3. "Just a Little Bit" (Juanita Carter, Mike Dean, Chris Stokes) (3:51)
4. "Please Don't Go" (Claudio Cueni, Chris Stokes) (4:31)
5. "I Don't Know" (Juanita Carter, Sean "Mystro" Mather, Chris Stokes) (3:53)
6. "Pager" (Lamonte Lassiter) (4:19)
7. "Crazy" (Davina Bussey) (3:59)
8. "I Can't Stop the Rain" (Lamonte Lassiter, Derrick Monk, Chris Stokes) (3:44)
9. "A Boy Like Me" (Chris Stokes, T.J. Thompson) (3:38)
10. "Candy" (B Team) (4:53)
11. "When It's Love" (Juanita Carter, Sean "Mystro" Mather, Chris Stokes) (4:03)
12. "Pay You Back" (Chris Stokes) (4:09)
13. "Feel the Funk" (Skip Scarborough, Chris Stokes) (4:52)

== Charts ==
=== Weekly charts ===
Weekly chart performance for We Got It
Chart (1995)	Peak position
US Billboard 200	76
US Top R&B/Hip-Hop Albums (Billboard)	14

=== Year-end charts ===
Year-end chart performance for We Got It
Chart (1996)	Position
US Billboard 200	180
US Top R&B/Hip-Hop Albums (Billboard)	63

== Certifications ==
Certifications for We Got It
Region	Certification	Certified units/sales
United States (RIAA)	Gold	500,000^{^}
^{^} Shipments figures based on certification alone.
