= IMx (album) =

Studio album by IMx
- Released: August 21, 2001
- Genre: R&B
- Labels: TUG; New Line
- Producer: Chris Stokes

IMx chronology
Greatest Hits (2001)	IMx (2001)	Remember (2015)

Singles from IMx
- 1. "Clap Your Hand (Pt. 2)" Released: June 5, 2001; 2. "First Time" Released: January 15, 2002; 3. "Beautiful (You Are)" Released: March 2002; 4. "Ain't No Need" Released: August 2002

IMx is the self-titled sixth album by American band IMx. It was released by TUG Entertainment and New Line Records on August 21, 2001. The album was the group's first album not to be released under the former label, MCA Records. Chiefly produced by Chris Stokes, IMx peaked at number 126 on the US Billboard 200, also reaching number 26 on the Top R&B/Hip-Hop Albums and number 2 on the Independent Albums. The song "Ain't No Need" was briefly used as a promotional gimmick for the 2002 comedy film The Adventures of Pluto Nash.

== Track listing ==
No.	Title	Writer(s)	Producer(s)	Length
1.	"Hate the Playa"	J. Singletary, James Sanders, Jerome Jones & Marques Houston	Storm & Chris Stokes	4:43
2.	"First Time"	Jerome Jones, Marc Gordon & Platinum Status	Marc Gordon & Chris Stokes	4:26
3.	"Ain't No Need"	Jerome Jones & Platinum Status	Chris Stokes & Platinum Status	3:54
4.	"Clap Your Hands, Pt. 1 (Feat. Mila J)"	Jerome Jones & Platinum Status	Chris Stokes & Platinum Status	3:44
5.	"Ashamed"	Jerome Jones, Marc Gordon & Platinum Status	Marc Gordon & Chris Stokes	4:00
6.	"Beautiful (You Are)"	Armando Colon & Barry Reed, Jr.	Armando Colon	4:25
7.	"Clap Your Hands, Pt. 2"	Jerome Jones & Platinum Status	Chris Stokes & Platinum Status	3:28
8.	"First Of All"	Jerome Jones, Lew Laing, Eric Jackson, Lew Laing & Platinum Status	Chris Stokes & Platinum Status	4:19
9.	"Pillow"	Charles Stanton, Chris Stokes & Marc Gordon	Marc Gordon	3:52
10.	"Why"	J. Singletary, James Sanders, Jerome Jones & Marques Houston	Chris Stokes + Storm (co-producer)	3:25
11.	"Tears"	Jerome Jones & Platinum Status	Chris Stokes & Platinum Status	3:12

== Charts ==
Chart (2001)	Peak position
US Billboard 200	126
US Independent Albums (Billboard)	2
US Top R&B/Hip-Hop Albums (Billboard)	26
