= On Our Worst Behavior =

Studio album by Immature
- Released: September 22, 1992
- Recorded: 1992
- Genre: New jack swing
- Length: 48:00
- Label: Virgin
- Producer: Marquis "Hami" Dair; Chris Stokes; Cyrus Melchor; Chris "Tricky" Stewart; Kuk Harrell; Blueblood

Immature chronology
On Our Worst Behavior (1992)	Playtyme Is Over (1994)

Singles from On Our Worst Behavior
- 1. "Tear It Up (On Our Worst Behavior)" Released: August 28, 1992; 2. "Da Munchies" Released: December 7, 1992; 3. "Be My Girl" Released: 1993; 4. "I Wanna Know U That Way" Released: 1993

Professional ratings
Review scores
Source	Rating
Allmusic	link

On Our Worst Behavior is the debut album by American band Immature, released on September 22, 1992 on Virgin Records. It is also the only album to feature former member, Don "Half-Pint" Santos, who was replaced by Kelton "LDB" Kessee. Rapper Megan Thee Stallion sampled the song ''Is It Love This Time" for her song "Big Ole Freak" from her second EP Tina Snow.

== Track listing ==
1. "Funky Psychtro Enterview" (2:39)
2. "You're All That" (5:01)
3. "Mom's Illin'" (Forty Oz. Edit) (0:26)
4. "Honey Dip" (3:22)
5. "Anti Splurgian Girl" (0:04)
6. "Be My Girl" (4:30)
7. "Let Me Hmm Hmm Hmm" (4:16)
8. "Da Munchies" (4:30)
9. "I Wanna Know You That Way" (3:29)
10. "(Good Things) Come to Those Who Wait" (3:38)
11. "Meet Me Outside" (4:02)
12. "Tear It Up (On Our Worst Behavior)" (3:25)
13. "Is It Love This Time" (4:28)
14. "Wiser Than My Years" (5:21)

== Singles ==
- Tear it Up (On Our Worst Behavior)
  Release date: August 28, 1992
- Da Munchies
  Release date: December 7, 1992
- A1 Da Munchies [12" Truck Diesel] 5:40
- A2 Da Munchies [12" Truck Diesel Club Dub] 4:05
- A3 Da Munchies [12" Mix #2] 6:24
- B1 Da Munchies [7" Diesel No Crossover Radio Mix] 4:10
- B2 Da Munchies [7" Diesel Mix Without Rap] 3:34
- B3 Da Munchies [LP Version] 4:24

== Additional personnel ==
- Raquel McQueen (vocals)
- Blueblood
- LROC
- Mixzo (various instruments)
- Christopher Troy (piano, keyboards, drums)
- Chris Stokes (keyboards)
- Cyrus Melchor (keyboards, programming)
- Charles Norris (keyboards, drum programming)
- Kuk Harrell
- Chris "Tricky" Stewart (drums, keyboards)
- Marquis "Hami" Dair
- Jermaine Dupri (programming, keyboards)
- Dionne Farris
- Brandy Diggs (background vocals).
