= Smooth (singer) =

American rapper

- Also known as: MC Smooth, Needa S.
- Born: Juanita Stokes
- Origin: Los Angeles, California, U.S.
- Genres: Hip hop, R&B
- Occupations: Rapper, singer
- Years active: 1984–2014
- Labels: Crush Music, Jive, Perspective

Juanita Stokes, currently known as Needa S. and formerly as Smooth and MC Smooth, is an American singer and rapper.

== Career ==
Stokes began her career as MC Smooth, signing a record deal with the independent label Crush Music in 1990. She released her debut single "Smooth & Legit" that year, which peaked at #11 on the U.S. Rap chart. Her debut album Smooth & Legit followed on April 27, 1990 (peaking at #72 on the R&B/Hip Hop chart) and was produced by her brother Chris Stokes and Arabian Prince. Two singles "You Gotta Be Real" and "Where is the Money?" followed but did not garner much airplay. Three years later, she signed a major label deal with Jive Records and began work on her sophomore album, dropping the MC from her moniker. Her first single under the new deal, "Female Mac" garnered some airplay, and it was soon followed by the release of her second album You Been Played on August 24, 1993, which peaked at #77 on the R&B/Hip Hop Albums chart. The title track was released as the set's follow-up single. Soon after, she began work on her third studio album, releasing the first single "Mind Blowin'" in 1995. The single became her breakthrough hit, hitting #7 on the Rap chart, #31 on R&B, and #75 on the Billboard Hot 100 (her first entry on that chart). Her self-titled third album was released on August 1, 1995, peaking at #35 on the R&B/Hip Hop albums chart and #17 on the Heatseekers chart. Four more singles would be released from the project: "Blowin' Up My Pager" "It's Summertime" "Love Groove" and "Undercover Lover" of which the latter three garnered her success in the UK.

Later that year, she collaborated with the R&B group Immature on their single "We Got It" which was released as a single in 1996 and became a hit, peaking at #37 on the Hot 100 and #11 on the R&B chart. She would later collaborate with them again on the song "Watch Me Do My Thing". She released a stand-alone single, "Love & Happiness" which had some airplay on the R&B stations.

In 1997, Smooth moved to Perspective Records, a joint venture with A&M Records and reintroduced herself as a R&B singer with alternative influences. She released her first single under the label, "Strawberries" that year, which became her biggest hit to date, peaking at #17 on R&B and #49 on the Hot 100. Her fourth album, Reality was released on March 10, 1998. It would peak at #48 on the R&B/Hip Hop Albums chart and #32 on the Heatseekers. One more single, "He Thinks She Don't Know" was released.

In 2003, she rebranded herself once again, under the Needa S moniker. Two singles "Sensitive" and "Baby's Mama" were released, but her fifth studio album What? was eventually shelved.

In 2013, it was announced she had joined the upcoming BET reality series Hip Hop Sisters which would focus on six female rappers' lives and their attempts to relaunch their careers. Other rappers confirmed to appear were MC Lyte, Lady of Rage, Monie Love, Lil Mama, and Yo-Yo.

== Personal life ==
She has two daughters: Earanequa Carter, born in 1990; and Jaysa Charles, born in 2001.

== Albums ==
=== Studio albums ===
List of studio albums, with selected chart positions and certifications
Title	Album details	Peak chart positions		
Title	Album details	US R&B /HH	US Heat.	UK R&B
Smooth & Legit	Released: April 27, 1990; Label: Crush Music; Formats: CD, cassette	72	—	—
You Been Played	Released: August 24, 1993; Label: Jive; Formats: CD, cassette, streaming	77	—	—
Smooth	Released: August 1, 1995; Label: Jive; Formats: CD, LP, cassette, digital download, streaming	35	17	18
Reality	Released: March 10, 1998; Label: Perspective; Formats: CD, cassette, streaming	48	32	—
"—" denotes a recording that did not chart or was not released in that territory.

=== Unreleased albums ===
- What? (2003)

== Singles ==
=== As lead artist ===
List of singles with selected chart positions, showing year released and album name
Title	Year	Peak chart positions						Album
Title	Year	US	US R&B	US Rap	UK	UK Dance	UK R&B	Album
"Smooth & Legit"	1990	—	—	11	—	—	—	Smooth & Legit
"You Gotta Be Real" (Note: Published as "MC Smooth")	1990	—	—	—	—	—	—	Smooth & Legit
"Where Is The Money"	1991	—	—	—	—	—	—	Smooth & Legit
"Female Mac"	1993	—	—	47	—	—	—	You Been Played
"You Been Played"	1993	— (Note: "You Been Played" did not enter the Billboard Hot 100, but peaked at number 15 on the Bubbling Under Hot 100.)	54	—	—	—	—	Menace II Society Soundtrack and You Been Played
"Mind Blowin'"	1995	75	31	7	36	14	7	Smooth
"It's Summertime (Let It Get Into You)"	1995	—	—	—	46	20	8	Smooth
"Love Groove (Groove With You)"	1996	—	—	—	46	22	10	Smooth
"Undercover Lover"	1996	—	—	—	41	29	4	Smooth
"Love & Happiness"	1996	— (Note: "Love & Happiness" did not enter the Billboard Hot 100, but peaked at number 20 on the Bubbling Under Hot 100.)	66	—	—	—	—	Non-album single
"Strawberries"	1998	49	17	—	82	—	18	Reality
"—" denotes a recording that did not chart or was not released in that territory.

=== Featured singles ===
List of singles as featured artist, with selected chart positions showing year released and album name
Title	Year	Peak chart positions						Album
Title	Year	US	US R&B	NZ	UK	UK Dance	UK R&B	Album
"We Got It" (Immature featuring Smooth)	1996	37	11	27	26	16	5	All That Soundtrack and We Got It
"Watch Me Do My Thing" (Immature featuring Smooth and Ed from Good Burgers)	1996	32	16	—	—	—	—	All That Soundtrack
"—" denotes a recording that did not chart or was not released in that territory.

=== Promotional singles ===
List of singles, showing year released and album name
Title	Year	Album
"Blowin' Up My Pager"	1995	Smooth
"He Thinks She Don't Know"	1998	Reality
"Virginity" (TG4 featuring Smooth)	2002	Non-album singles
"Sensitive" (featuring Da Brat & Jhené Aiko) (Note: Published as "Needa-S")	2003	Non-album singles
"Zoom"	2004	Non-album singles
