= Angelique Bates =

American actress, comedian, and rapper (born 1980)

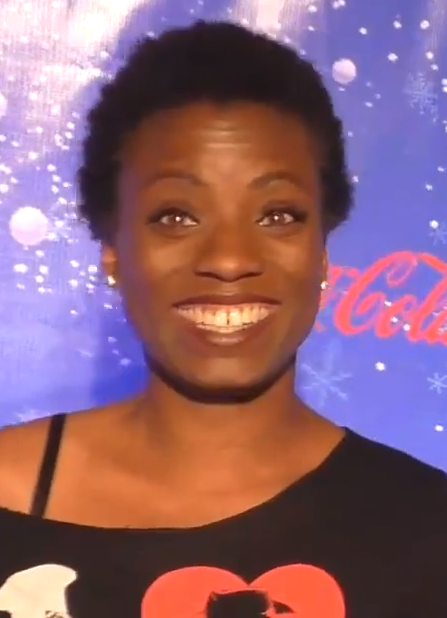
- Bates in 2016
- Born: December 1, 1980 (age 45); Los Angeles, California, U.S.
- Occupations: Actress, comedian, rapper
- Years active: 1994–present
- Website: www.angeliquebates.com

Angelique Bates (born December 1, 1980) is an American actress, comedian, and rapper who is best known for the two seasons she served on the Nickelodeon sketch-comedy series All That.

== Career ==
=== Early career ===
Bates was born and raised in Los Angeles, California, and is of Haitian and Bahamian descent. Bates got her start in a Borax commercial when she was a baby. She subsequently landed an AT&T commercial and a co-starring role in the short film Sweet Potato Ride.

=== All That ===
Bates auditioned for the series in 1994. She did a Steve Urkel impression, among other things. Following four or five auditions, Bates got the part.

Bates left All That after two seasons; she was the first original cast member to leave the series. She did however return for the 100th episode, along with fellow All That alumnae Katrina Johnson and Alisa Reyes.

=== Later career ===
In 2012, Bates recorded an album produced by Expat records and tried her hand at comedy.

In an interview with The Blast in March 2024, Bates said that All That producer Dan Schneider regularly subjected her to verbal and emotional abuse, and that another cast member, whom she did not name, once spat on her on camera.

== Filmography ==
Film
Year	Title	Role	Notes
1994	Sweet Potato Ride	Katrina	Short film
2003	Thirteen	Cashier	Uncredited
2011	35 and Ticking	Gangster Girl	
2016	Bitter	Seedra	Short film
2018	Demetrinox	Wife at barbecue	Short film
2018	Dunia Ni Matembezi		Short film

Television
Year	Title	Role	Notes
1994–1996	All That	Herself/Various	31 episodes
2000	Strong Medicine	Natalie	Season 1 episode 5: "Performance Anxiety"
2001	Boston Public	Sylvia	Season 2 episode 2: "Chapter Twenty-Four"
2003	Anything for Love	Herself	Season 1 episode 2
2009	Tim and Eric Awesome Show, Great Job!	Bub Bubs Singer	Season 4 episode 6: "Origins"
2018	Bonnet Chronicles	Linda	Web miniseries
