= IMx =

American R&B group

Background information
- Also known as: Immature
- Origin: Los Angeles, California, U.S.
- Genre: R&B
- Years active: 1992–2002, 2010–2019
- Labels: Virgin; MCA; TUG; New Line
- Members: Marques Houston; Jerome Jones; Kelton Kessee
- Past members: Don Santos
- Website: http://immatureofficial.com/

Immature (later known as IMx) is an American R&B boy band, managed by record producer Chris Stokes. Its members include Marques "Batman" Houston (born August 4, 1981), Jerome "Romeo" Jones (born October 25, 1981), and Kelton "LDB" Kessee (born January 2, 1981), all natives of Los Angeles, where the group was formed. The group released four albums under the Immature moniker: On Our Worst Behavior (1992; the only album to include original member Don "Half Pint" Santos, later replaced by Kessee), Playtyme Is Over (1994), We Got It (1995) and The Journey (1997).

In 1999, the group changed its name to IMx, marking ten years of being a group and released two studio albums Introducing IMx and IMx, as well as a Greatest Hits album in 2001. The group also branched out into film (such as House Party 3 and House Party 4: Down to the Last Minute) and television (such as A Different World, Sister, Sister, Family Matters, Soul Train and All That) before disbanding in 2002.

On November 6, 2013, Immature performed their first show since reuniting at Club Nokia in Los Angeles with Next and Dru Hill. In September 2019, Immature announced their #TBTour with special guests Ray J, B5 and J. Holiday.

== Biography ==
Immature was formed in Los Angeles, California in 1990 by Marques "Batman" Houston, Jerome "Romeo" Jones and Don "Half-Pint" Santos.Kelton "LDB" Kessee (the group's drummer at the time) joined the group full-time in 1994, replacing Santos due to his parents pulling him from the group after him and the rest of the members starred in House Party 3. In 1999, the group would change their name to IMx, feeling Immature no longer reflected the band.

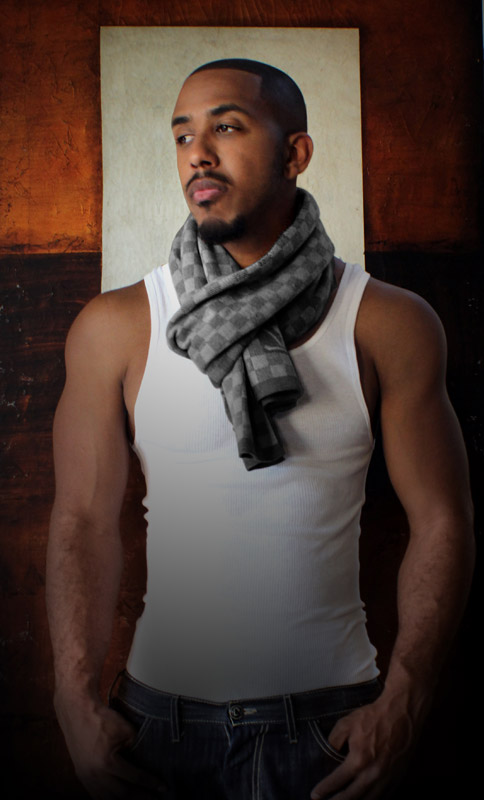
Marques Houston, lead singer of Immature/IMx

=== After IMx ===
In 2002, the group disbanded. Houston and Jones (under the name Young Rome) began pursuing solo careers, while Kessee continued his work as a record producer. Houston became the first former member to release a solo album, MH, in 2003. Jones followed suit with the release of his debut solo album, titled Food for Thought, in 2004. Houston later released five additional albums: Naked (2005), Veteran (2007), Mr. Houston (2009), Mattress Music (2010) and Famous (2013).

Houston and Jones have also pursued acting careers, with both starring in the dance film, You Got Served (2004). Houston co-starred in Fat Albert (2004) and landed a lead role in UPN's comedy sitcom Cuts. In 2007, he starred in the horror film Somebody Help Me. He also appeared as Roger on the show Sister, Sister (1994–1998).

== Music career ==
=== Immature ===
==== On Our Worst Behavior ====
In 1992, Immature released their debut album, On Our Worst Behavior, on September 22. The album featured singles "Da Munchies", "I Wanna Know U That Way", "Be My Girl" and "Tear It Up (On Our Worst Behavior)" which also appeared on the soundtrack for the animated film Bebe's Kids, in which Houston provided his voice for the character Khalil.

Although the album failed to make it onto any of Billboard's charts, their song "Tear It Up (On Our Worst Behavior)" managed to make it onto Billboard's Hot R&B/Hip-Hop Songs, peaking at number 29.

==== Playtyme Is Over ====
Immature released their second album, Playtyme Is Over, on August 2, 1994, after signing a deal with MCA Records. The album featured singles "Never Lie" (their biggest hit), "Constantly" and "I Don't Mind".

In the United States, Playtyme Is Over peaked at number 88 on the Billboard 200 and peaked at number 26 on Billboard's Top R&B/Hip-Hop Albums.

==== We Got It ====
In 1995, Immature released their third album, We Got It. The album featured singles "We Got It", "Lover's Groove" and "Please Don't Go".

In the United States, We Got It peaked at number 76 on the Billboard 200 and peaked at number 14 on Billboard's Top R&B/Hip-Hop Albums.

==== The Journey ====
In 1997, Immature released their fourth album, The Journey, which was their last under the name Immature. The album featured singles "I'm Not a Fool", "Give Up The Ghost" (featuring Bizzy Bone) and "Extra, Extra" (written by and featuring Keith Sweat).

In the United States, The Journey peaked at number 92 on the Billboard 200 and peaked at number 20 on Billboard's Top R&B/Hip-Hop Albums.

The track "Tamika" appeared on the sitcom Sister, Sister episode "A Friend in Deed", which first aired on October 29, 1997. In this episode, the group performed as themselves at the school fundraiser.

==== Introducing IMx ====
In 1999, Immature changed their name to IMx and released their fifth album, Introducing IMx. The album featured singles "Stay the Night", "Keep It On the Low" and "In & Out of Love". It was the group's last album with MCA Records.

In the United States, Introducing IMx peaked at number 101 on the Billboard 200 and peaked at number 31 on Billboard's Top R&B/Hip-Hop Albums.

==== IMx ====
On August 21, 2001, IMx released their sixth album, IMx, after signing a deal with TUG Entertainment and New Line Records (now WaterTower Music). The album featured singles "First Time", "Beautiful (You Are)", "Clap Your Hands Pt. 1" and "Ain't No Need" (which also appeared on the soundtrack for the film The Adventures of Pluto Nash).

In the United States, IMx peaked at number 126 on the Billboard 200, being their lowest charting Billboard spot. and peaked at number 26 on Billboard's Top R&B/Hip-Hop Albums.

==== Remember ====
In early 2015, the band reunited to release a comeback EP titled Remember, and changed their name back to Immature. The album featured mature-sounding remakes of their classic hits "Never Lie" and "Please Don't Go" along with six newly released songs such as "Let Me Find Out", "Oh My" and "Best Sex".

=== Other works ===
On February 27, 2001, IMx released their Greatest Hits album which featured all of the popular singles that Immature/IMx had released in the past nine years. It also included several remixes of the original versions and songs, on which they had made guest appearances (such as R&B singer Monteco's song "Is It Me?").

The group's song "Keep it on the Low" was used as the theme song for the film House Party 4: Down to the Last Minute, of which they also are the stars.

Immature collaborated with comedy actor Kel Mitchell on the hit song "Watch Me Do My Thing", which was featured on the soundtrack of the Nickelodeon sketch comedy, All That.

== Members ==
=== Current lineup ===
- Marques "Batman" Houston – lead vocals (1991–2002; 2010–2019)
- Kelton "LDB" Kessee – background vocals (1994–2002; 2010–2019)
- Jerome "Romeo" Jones – main rapper, background vocals (1991–2002; 2010–2019)

=== Former members ===
- Don "Half Pint" Santos – background vocals, rapper (1991–1994)

== Discography ==
- On Our Worst Behavior (1992)
- Playtyme Is Over (1994)
- We Got It (1995)
- The Journey (1997)
- Introducing IMx (1999)
- IMx (2001)
- Remember EP (2015)
