= Marques Houston discography =

R&B recording artist discography

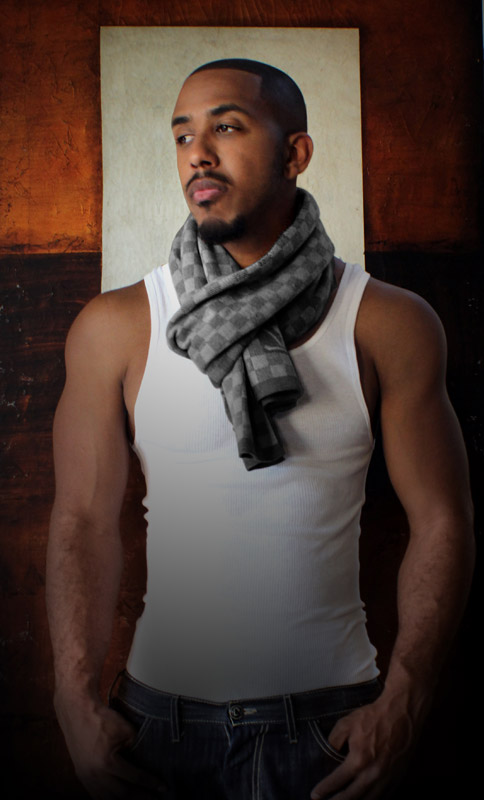
- Houston in 2012
- Studio albums: 8
- Extended plays: 1
- Singles: 42
- Music videos: 22

This is a discography for the R&B artist Marques Houston.

== Albums ==
=== Studio albums ===
List of studio albums, with selected chart positions and certifications
Title	Album details	Peak chart positions			Certifications
Title	Album details	US	US R&B	UK	Certifications
MH	Released: October 21, 2003; Label: TUG, Elektra; Formats: CD, digital download	18	5	73	BPI: Silver
Naked	Released: May 24, 2005; Label: TUG, Universal; Formats: CD, digital download	13	5	— (Note: "Naked" did not enter the UK Album Chart but debuted and peaked at number 31 on the UK Hip Hop & R&B Albums Chart.)	RIAA: Gold
Veteran	Released: March 27, 2007; Label: TUG, Universal Motown; Formats: CD, digital download	5	1	—	
Mr. Houston	Released: September 29, 2009; Label: MusicWorks, Fontana; Formats: CD, digital download	62	12	—	
Mattress Music	Released: September 14, 2010; Label: MusicWorks, EMI; Formats: CD, digital download	71	14	—	
Famous	Released: August 27, 2013; Label: Silent Partner, Shanachie; Formats: CD, digital download	180	33	—	
Me	Released: February 4, 2022; Label: Phoenix, Corite; Formats: Digital download	—	—	—	
The Best Worst Year Ever	Released: August 30, 2024; Label: Phoenix; Formats: Digital download	—	—	—	
"—" denotes a title that did not chart, or was not released in that territory.

=== Mixtapes ===
List of mixtapes, with selected details
Title	Album details
Sex, Lies & MH	Released: September 9, 2009; Hosted By DJ Pro Style
Battlefield America Soundtrack Mixtape Vol. 2	Released: June 1, 2012; Hosted By Jahlil Beats
Never Lead You On	Released: October 9, 2012

== Extended plays ==
List of extended plays, with selected details
Title	EP details
Me: Dark Water	Released: November 4, 2022; Label: Phoenix; Format: Digital download

== Singles ==
List of singles as lead artist, with selected peak chart positions and parent album
Title	Year	Chart peak positions			Album
Title	Year	US	US R&B	UK	Album
"That Girl"	2003	63	24	—	MH
"Clubbin" (featuring Joe Budden & R. Kelly)	2003	39	12	15	MH
"Pop That Booty" (featuring Jermaine Dupri)	2003	76	34	23	MH
"Because of You"	2004	76	23	51	MH
"All Because of You" (featuring Young Rome)	2005	69	14	—	Naked
"Naked"	2005	47	8	—	Naked
"Sex Wit You"	2005	—	64	—	Naked
"Like This" (featuring Yung Joc)	2006	—	56	—	Veteran
"Favorite Girl"	2006	—	56	—	Veteran
"Circle"	2007	78	37	—	Veteran
"Wonderful"	2007	—	50	—	Veteran
"Always & Forever"	2008	—	—	—	Veteran
"I Love Her" (featuring Jim Jones)	2009	—	85	—	Mr. Houston
"Sunset"	2009	—	—	—	Mr. Houston
"Kickin & Screamin'"	2010	—	70	—	Mattress Music
"Pullin' on Her Hair" (featuring Rick Ross)	2010	—	64	—	Mattress Music
"Speechless"	2013	—	—	—	Famous
"Give Your Love a Try" (featuring Problem)	2013	—	—	—	Famous
"Need You"	2015	—	—	—	Will to Love Soundtrack
"Complete Me"	2016	—	—	—	Non-album single
"Together"	2017	—	—	—	Til Death Do Us Part soundtrack
"Let It Go" (featuring Chrissy)	2022	—	—	—	Me
"Forever's Not Long Enough"	2022	—	—	—	Me
"Half On It"	2022	—	—	—	Me
"Just to Have You"	2022	—	—	—	Me
"Admit It"	2024	—	—	—	The Best Worst Year Ever
"Last Drop"	2024	—	—	—	The Best Worst Year Ever
"Cowgirl"	2024	—	—	—	The Best Worst Year Ever
"Tired of Hollywood"	2024	—	—	—	The Best Worst Year Ever
"So Alive"	2024	—	—	—	The Best Worst Year Ever
"Picture Perfect"	2024	—	—	—	The Best Worst Year Ever
"Hold On"	2024	—	—	—	The Best Worst Year Ever
"Only Me"	2026	—	—	—	Non-album singles
"Her Side of the Bed"	2026	—	—	—	Non-album singles
"Hijacked"	2026	—	—	—	Non-album singles
"—" denotes a title that did not chart, or was not released in that territory.

=== Featured singles ===
List of featured singles, with selected chart positions and parent album
Song	Year	Chart peak positions			Album
Song	Year	US	US R&B	US Rap	Album
"After Party" (Young Rome feat. Marques Houston & Omarion)	2004	—	—	—	Food for Thought
"For Your Love" (Young Rome feat. Marques Houston)	2005	—	—	—	Non-album single
"Good Lookin' Out" (Mila J feat. Marques Houston)	2006	—	64	—	Split Personality
"1st Time" (Yung Joc feat. Marques Houston & Trey Songz)	2006	85	15	11	New Joc City
"Special Girl" (Romeo feat. Marques Houston)	2007	—	—	—	Get Low LP
"Sugar & Spice" (Rich Rick feat. Marques Houston)	2010	—	—	—	Non-album single
"F.L.Y" (Chrissy feat. Marques Houston)	2020	—	—	—	Taken
"—" denotes a title that did not chart, or was not released in that territory.

== Other charted songs ==
Year	Song	Chart peak positions	Album
Year	Song	US R&B	Album
2009	"Body"	59	Mr. Houston
2018	"Stronger"	—	'Til Death Do Us Part Soundtrack
