= Christopher Jones (actor, born 1982) =

American actor and dancer (born 1982)

- Born: Christopher Michael Jones; February 4, 1982 (age 44); Myrtle Beach, South Carolina U.S.
- Other name: Chris Jones
- Occupation: Actor/Dancer
- Years active: 1984-present

Christopher Michael Jones is an American actor and dancer, best known for portraying Wade in You Got Served and Anthony Bishop in Big Momma's House 2.

== Early life ==
Christopher began his career as a dancer at the age of 4 and began competing in many dance competitions around the world. At age 10 he was offered roles in the Broadway touring companies of Camelot and The Secret Garden.

== Career ==
After Christopher did Broadway roles he decided to go to Hollywood where he began dancing with big-name artists such as P Diddy and Busta Rhymes on the Soul Train Awards. He also appeared in a Britney Spears Pepsi commercial and her VMA's in 2000. He went on to appear in other musicians videos such as Dream, Shorty 101, and Willa Ford. Then after touring and dancing on other music artist videos he had got his acting debut as Wade the spiky haired antagonist on You Got Served. After his debut big screen success he began doing films such as Big Momma's House 2, Lost in Plainview, and Steppin: The Movie.

== Filmography ==
- Forrest Gump (1994)
- Tad (1995)
- This World, Then the Fireworks (1997)
- Holy Joe (1999)
- O (2001)
- You Got Served (2004)
- Lost in Plainview (2005)
- Big Momma's House 2 (2006)
- Somebody Help Me (2007)
- Steppin: The Movie (2009)
- Battlefield America (2012)
- No Vacancy (2012)
