= The Four Postmen =

American rock band

- Origin: Los Angeles, California
- Genres: Rock; Comedy
- Years active: 1992–present
- Members: Ken Weiler; Geoff Dunbar; Matt Kaminsky; Brett Pearsons; Stefan Marks

The Four Postmen are an American rock band from Los Angeles, consisting of Ken Weiler (electric guitar, vocals), Matt Kaminsky (vocals, keyboards), Stefan Marks (acoustic guitar, vocals), Geoff Dunbar (drums), and Brett Pearsons (bass guitar).

== History ==
The Four Postmen formed in 1992, and in 1996 signed a development deal with NBC Studios to create a TV show based on their group. The band has performed on NBC's Friday Night Videos, Fox's Futurama, MTV's Undressed, and has composed original music for NBC's Thrillogy Series as well as several independent feature films. They wrote original music for the feature film The Sky is Falling, and all band members were cast in the movie. They have released four full-length albums: U.S. Male (1993), Looking For Grandpa (1997), Hit Record (2001), and What The Hell Happened (2004).

On November 6, 2007, The Four Postmen headlined a fundraiser for Reading to Kids at the Temple Bar in Santa Monica.

== Style ==
Featuring an emphasis on three-part vocal harmony, their live shows are highly theatrical, and feature numerous comic interludes. The band are sometimes compared to Barenaked Ladies, and have been described by GQ Magazine as "The Seinfeldesque Monkees".

== Members ==
- Ken Weiler - "Postman #1" - Vocals/Electric Guitar
- Matt Kaminsky - "Postman #2" - Vocals/Keyboards
- Stefan Marks - "Postman #3" - Vocals/Acoustic Guitar
- Geoff Dunbar - "Postman #4" - Drums
- Brett Pearsons - "Postman #5" - Bass

== Discography ==
=== U.S. Male (1993) ===
- There Are Things
- Dragon
- Are Ya Listnin'?
- I Asked You
- I Always Wanted To Be...
- Sun
- Indian
- Yes I'm Lucky
- All I Know Is I Like You
- Blood Suckin' Postman
- 31 Cents
- Praise
- I'm Your Man
- Red Hot Rap
- Miles & Miles
- Farm Boys
- Hazy Day
- Fish
- Used To... I Don't Know
- Mailman Song
- Rabbit Valley

=== Looking For Grandpa (1997) ===
- Where's My River?
- In The Pouch of a Kangaroo
- Four Years of High School Spanish
- The Lobster Quadrille
- The Pied Piper
- I've Gotta Tan...
- What I Am
- Indian
- She's 17...
- I Wanna Dance
- It's All About Me
- Catbox
- Baby Jesus
- What Can I Do?
- I Bought You Dinner...
- Rabbit Valley
- I'm Your Man
- Lost Vegas

=== Hit Record (2001) ===
- Sleep
- What's Your Favrit #, Baby?
- Pornostar
- Now
- (The) Chainsaw Juggler
- Dinner Of Love
- Gentleman A
- I'd Have To Be Drunk
- I Got My Eye On You
- I Want My Money Back
- Let Me Make You Smile In Bed
- M-A-L-E Man
- She Is Walking Away
- Something To Squeeze
- There Are Things
- When Man Was A Monkey
- Why? How? Who?
- (The) Horrible Movie Song

=== What the Hell Happened? (2004) ===
- The Three Postmen
- Corn
- Forgive Me, Love
- No Banjo!
- The Dirty Show
- A Gentleman's Heart
- I Asked You
- Joke Band
- Girl Take Me From Behind
- The Lemon Tree
- Thump
- Co-Dependent
- Geoff Speaks
- The Drinking Song
- The Underwear Song
- A Piece of Ass
- I'm Gonna Die
- My Christian Love
- No One Thinks the Way I Do
- Thanks
- Get Off The Stage!

=== ″5-Pack: Volume 1″ (2007) ===
- The Karaoke King
- Bed A' Nails
- Drivin' Me
- Coffee Girl
- Parachute

=== ″5-Pak: Vol. 2″ (2012) ===
- Man V Woman
- Dr. Tell Me
- Bug
- Bloodline
- Procrastinate
- Assembly Line
