= MH (album) =

Studio album by Marques Houston
- Released: October 21, 2003
- Length: 60:03
- Labels: The Ultimate Group; Elektra
- Producers: Charles Alexander; Rufus Blaq; Lamont "Logic" Coleman; Marques Houston; Chris "C-Kaye" Kelly; R. Kelly; Kowan "Q" Paul; Platinum Status; Steve Russell; Tony Scott; Tricky Stewart; Chris Stokes; Troy Taylor; Kenny "Bermuda" Whitehead

Marques Houston chronology
MH (2003)	Naked (2005)

Singles from MH
- 1. "That Girl" Released: March 26, 2003; 2. "Clubbin'" Released: June 25, 2003; 3. "Pop That Booty" Released: September 24, 2003; 4. "Because of You" Released: January 28, 2004

MH is the debut solo album by American R&B singer Marques Houston. Conceived after the disbandment of his former boy band Immature, the album was released by Elektra Records on October 21, 2003, in the United States. MH features guest appearances by Joe Budden, Jermaine Dupri, former B2K member Lil' Fizz and peaked at number 18 on the US Billboard 200, and peaked at number 5 on Billboard's Top R&B/Hip-Hop Albums.

== Critical reception ==
Professional ratings
Review scores
Source	Rating
AllMusic	3/5 stars

AllMusic editor Andy Kellman found that "Houston doesn't have much in the way of originality to offer, but he and his collaborators have put together a respectable album that should retain his original fan base while adding some new admirers. The fact that Houston co-produced and wrote a handful of the songs — some of which are among the album's best — bodes well for a future that he's been keeping in mind ever since the Immature days."

== Track listing ==
MH track listing
No.	Title	Writer(s)	Producer(s)	Length
1.	"Intro"		Houston	0:16
2.	"Clubbin'" (featuring Joe Budden and Pied Piper)	Robert Kelly; Budden	R. Kelly	4:04
3.	"Pop That Booty" (featuring Jermaine Dupri)	Marques Houston; Tony Scott	Scott; Houston	4:06
4.	"That Girl"	Kowan "Q" Paul; Patrick "J. Que" Smith; Shaffer Smith; Milton Davis	Paul	3:36
5.	"Because of You"	Troy Taylor; Steve Russell	Taylor; Russell	4:08
6.	"Walk Away"	Kenny "Bermuda" Whitehead	Whitehead	3:30
7.	"I Can Be the One"	Houston; Scott; Kelton Kessee; Jerome Jones	Platinum Status; Chris Stokes	3:33
8.	"Grass Is Greener"	Whitehead	Whitehead	3:58
9.	"Cancel"	Whitehead	Whitehead	3:58
10.	"Good Luck"	Rufus Moore; Brandon Howard; Chris Kelly	Rufus Blaq; Charles Alexander; Chris "C-Kaye" Kelly; Lamont "Logic" Coleman^{[a]}	3:33
11.	"Can I Call You"	Taylor; Johntá Austin	Taylor	4:37
12.	"Love's a Game"	Whitehead; Houston; Scott; Kessee; Jones	Whitehead; Platinum Status; Stokes	3:58
13.	"Tempted"	Houston; Scott; Kessee; Jones	Houston; Stokes	4:09
14.	"Actin' Up" (featuring Lil' Fizz)	Christopher Stewart	Tricky Stewart; Houston^{[a]}	3:24
15.	"Alone"	Houston; Jones; Scott	Houston; Scott; Stokes	4:05

Bonus tracks
No.	Title	Writer(s)	Producer(s)	Length
16.	"That Girl" (Remix) (featuring R. Kelly)	Kelly; Paul; P. Smith; S. Smith; Davis	R. Kelly	3:54
17.	"Clubbin'" (Remix) (featuring Joe Budden)	Kelly; Houston; Budden	R. Kelly; Houston^{[a]}	4:11

Notes

- ^{^[a]} denotes co-producer

== Charts ==
Weekly chart performance for MH
Chart (2003)	Peak position
UK Albums (Official Charts)	73
UK R&B Albums (Official Charts)	7
US Billboard 200	18
US Top R&B/Hip-Hop Albums (Billboard)	5

== Certifications ==
Certifications and sales for MH
Region	Certification	Certified units/sales
United Kingdom (BPI)	Silver	60,000^{^}
^{^} Shipments figures based on certification alone.

== Release history ==
Release dates and formats for MH
Region	Date	Label	Version
United States	October 21, 2003	Interscope; Elektra	Original
Japan	April 13, 2004	Interscope; Elektra	Reissue
