= Cultural depictions of George V =

List of theatrical depictions

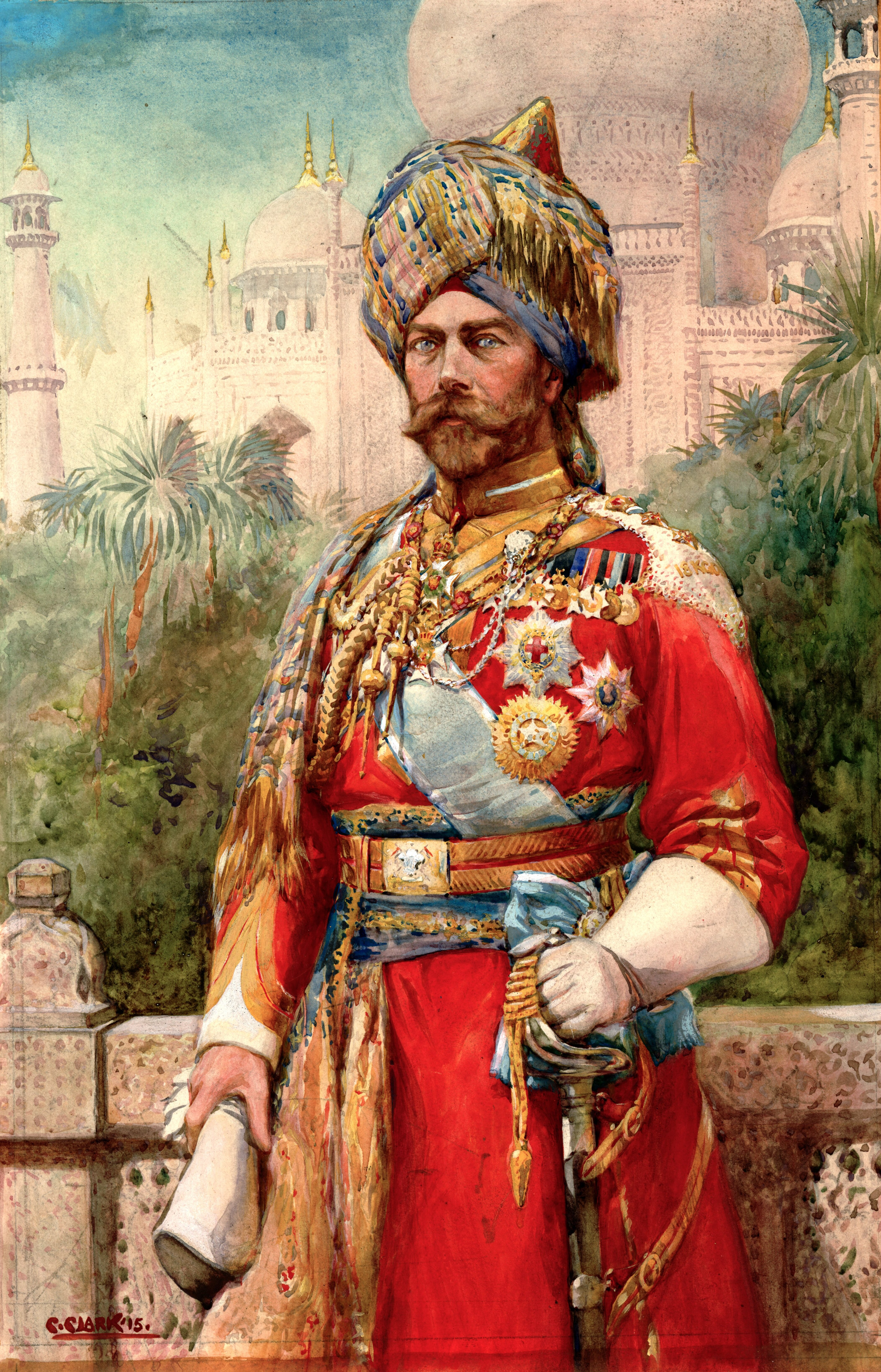
Portrait of George V at Delhi by Christopher Clark, 1915. He wears the uniform of the 18th King George's Own Lancers.

George V has been portrayed on screen by:

- Derek Erskine in the 1925 silent film The Scarlet Woman: An Ecclesiastical Melodrama
- Carleton Hobbs in the 1965 film A King's Story
- Michael Osborne in the 1975 ATV drama series Edward the Seventh
- Marius Goring in the 1978 Thames Television series Edward & Mrs. Simpson
- Keith Varnier in the 1978 LWT drama series Lillie
- Rene Aranda in the 1980 film The Fiendish Plot of Dr. Fu Manchu
- Terence Brook in the 1981 drama series The Life and Times of David Lloyd George
- Guy Deghy in the 1981 Southern Television drama series Winston Churchill: The Wilderness Years
- Andrew Gilmour in the 1985 Australian miniseries A Thousand Skies
- David Ravenswood in the 1990 Australian TV miniseries The Great Air Race
- John Warner in the 1991 RTÉ TV drama The Treaty
- David Troughton in the 1999 BBC TV drama All the King's Men
- Rupert Frazer in the 2002 TV miniseries Shackleton
- Alan Bates in the 2002 Carlton Television drama Bertie and Elizabeth
- Tom Hollander in the 2003 BBC miniseries The Lost Prince and in the 2021 film The King's Man
- Clifford Rose in the 2005 TV drama Wallis & Edward
- Julian Wadham in the 2007 TV drama My Boy Jack
- Laurence Rickard and Tom Stourton in 2009 TV series Horrible Histories
- Michael Gambon in the 2010 film The King's Speech
- James Fox in the 2011 film W.E.
- Guy Williams in the 2013 Christmas episode of Downton Abbey
- Simon Jones in the 2019 film Downton Abbey
- Richard Dillane in the 2022 fifth season of The Crown
- Jamie Thomas King in "Honeymoon in Hampshire" (November 7, 2022), episode 9 of season 16 of the Canadian television period drama Murdoch Mysteries
