= Veteran (Marques Houston album) =

Studio album by Marques Houston
- Released: March 19, 2007
- Genre: R&B
- Length: 45:30
- Labels: TUG; Universal Motown
- Producers: Cory Bold; Bryan-Michael Cox; B Howard; LaMont Lassiter; Candice Nelson; Cory Peterson; The Stereotypes; Chris Stokes; The Underdogs; Lil Walt

Marques Houston chronology
Naked (2005)	Veteran (2007)	Mr. Houston (2009)

Veteran is the third studio album by American R&B singer Marques Houston. It was released by The Ultimate Group and Universal Motown Records on March 20, 2007, in the United States, following the merger of Universal Records in 2005. The album features a wide range of collaborators, including Bryan-Michael Cox, Rob Knox, Ne-Yo, Chris Stokes, The Stereotypes, Tank, and The Underdogs. Guest vocals were provided by singer Mýa as well as rappers Shawnna and Yung Joc.

== Critical reception ==
Professional ratings
Review scores
Source	Rating
About.com	3/5 stars
AllMusic	4/5 stars
Okayplayer	2.5/5 stars
PopMatters	5/10 stars

Veteran received generally mixed to positive reviews from music critics. AllMusic editor Andy Kellman praised the production and lyrical qualities for being more hi-standard compared to Houston's previous efforts and for the maturity in his vocal delivery, saying that "he works the more romantic sentiments with enough conviction to indicate that he has more life experiences from which to draw." Joshua Alston of Vibe saw Houston's vocal work similar to that of Sam Cooke, saying that he "sounds sexier when he isn't working so damn hard at it. If only he had a clue."

Adam Pearthree of Okayplayer commended the mature approach the album takes with its songs but found it forgettable, along with Houston's identity crisis in his vocal performance, concluding that, "With stronger song selection [Marques] Houston could still come up with the adult oriented album he wants, but as of now, Veteran simply falls short." Mike Joseph of PopMatters also found the production and songwriting adequate. Still he felt it was too reminiscent of other established R&B artists, saying that "[T]he moments you notice on Veteran are the ones that remind you of other artists. Now in his mid-twenties, it's hard to say whether Houston will ever develop the singular personality that will elevate his career to the next level of hitmaker status."

== Commercial performance ==
In the United States, Veteran debuted and peaked at number 5 on the US Billboard 200, and number 1 on Billboard's Top R&B/Hip-Hop Albums. This marked Houston's first number-one solo album and his highest-charting album yet. Veteran sold almost 70,000 units in its first week. Billboard ranked the album 75th on its 2007 Top R&B/Hip-Hop Albums year-end chart.

== Track listing ==
Veteran track listing
No.	Title	Writer(s)	Producer(s)	Length
1.	"Veteran (Intro)"	Marques Houston; Damon Thomas	The Underdogs	2:28
2.	"Like This" (featuring Yung Joc)	Houston; Andre Merritt; Chris Stokes; Cory Peterson; Cory Bold; Jasiel Robertson	Bold; Stokes	3:51
3.	"Always & Forever"	Houston; Antonio Dixon; Thomas; David Balfour; Eric Dawkins; Harvey Mason, Jr.; Rob Knox; Steve Russell	The Underdogs; Knox^{[a]}	4:02
4.	"Favorite Girl"	Houston; Merritt; Brandon Howard	Howard; Exchange Student^{[a]}	3:33
5.	"Circle"	Houston; Adonis Shropshire; Bryan-Michael Cox; Kendrick Dean; Tanya White	Cox; WyldCard^{[a]}	4:02
6.	"Wonderful"	Jeremy Reeves; Johnathan Yip; Micayle McKinney; Shaffer Smith	Stereotypes	3:42
7.	"Exclusively"	Houston; Shropshire; Cox; Troy Johnson; White	Cox	4:08
8.	"How You Just Gonna"	Thomas; Durrell Babbs; Mason	The Underdogs; Tank^{[a]}	3:35
9.	"Hold N' Back" (featuring Mýa & Shawnna)	Houston; Merritt; Peterson; Rashawnna Guy	Peterson	4:23
10.	"Kimberly"	Houston; LaMont Lassiter; Rufus Moore	Lassiter; Rufus Blaq^{[a]}	4:24
11.	"So Right for Me"	Walter Millsap III; Candice Nelson	Lil Walt; Nelson	3:44
12.	"Miss Being Your Man"	Houston; Dixon; Thomas; Dawkins; Mason; Melvin Coleman	The Underdogs; Coleman^{[a]}	3:35
Total length:				45:30

Target bonus track
No.	Title	Writer(s)	Producer(s)	Length
13.	"Excited"	Houston; Stokes; Noel Fisher	Detail	3:44

Circuit City bonus DVD
No.	Title	Length
1.	"DVD Intro"	0:10
2.	"Interview with Raw Footage"	30:55
3.	"Favorite Girl"	3:34
4.	"Sex wit You"	4:14
5.	"Live European Performance"	1:13
6.	"Somebody Help Me Trailer"	2:10

Notes

- ^{^a} signifies a co-producer

Sample credits

- "So Right for Me" contains elements from "Pack'd My Bags" written by Chaka Khan and Tony Maiden.

== Charts ==
=== Weekly charts ===
Weekly chart performance for Veteran
Chart (2007)	Peak position
US Billboard 200	5
US Top R&B/Hip-Hop Albums (Billboard)	1

=== Year-end charts ===
Year-end chart performance for Veteran
Chart (2007)	Position
US Top R&B/Hip-Hop Albums (Billboard)	75
