= Wonderful (Marques Houston song) =

Single by Marques Houston

from the album Veteran
- Released: July 18, 2007
- Recorded: 2006
- Genre: R&B
- Length: 3:42
- Label: TUG
- Songwriters: Shaffer Smith, Micayle Mckinney, Jeremy Reeves, Jonathan Yip
- Producer: Stereotypes

Marques Houston singles chronology
"Circle" (2007)	"Wonderful" (2007)	"I Love Her" (2008)

"Wonderful" is the fourth single by Marques Houston's third studio album, Veteran. It's the sixth track on the album. It premiered on BET's Access Granted and Yahoo! Music on July 18, 2007. It peaked at No. 46 on the Billboard Hot R&B/Hip Hop Songs chart. The song was written by Ne-Yo, and produced by Stereotypes.
