= The Stepmother (2022 film) =

Thriller film by Chris Stokes

- Directed by: Chris Stokes
- Written by: Chris Stokes; Marques Houston
- Produced by: Chris Stokes; Marques Houston; Juanita Stokes; Erica Mena
- Starring: Marques Houston; Erica Mena
- Cinematography: Charlie Grey
- Edited by: Harvey White
- Music by: Immanuel Rich
- Production company: Footage Films
- Distributed by: Tubi
- Release date: June 17, 2022
- Running time: 89 minutes
- Country: United States
- Language: English

The Stepmother is a 2022 American psychological thriller film written by Chris Stokes and Marques Houston and directed by Stokes. The film stars Erica Mena as a woman with dissociative identity disorder, and Marques Houston as a recently widowed single father. It is a gender and race swapped reimagining of the 1987 horror film, The Stepfather.

The film was released by Tubi on June 17, 2022. A sequel titled The Stepmother 2, premiered on December 23, 2022. The Stepmother 3 was released by Tubi on June 8, 2023.

== Cast ==
- Erica Mena as Zoey McLaren/Elizabeth Carter/Diana Valdez
- Marques Houston as Eddie
- Chrissy Stokes as Jessica
- Justin Sweat as Scott
- Charles Malik Whitfield as Harrison
- Kida Burns as Mikey
- Cynthia Bailey as Vanessa
- Tanee McCall as April
- Tracy Z. as Lisa Bines
- Wesley Jonathan as Chris Harris
- LaVell Thompson Jr. as Dustin Smith
- Judi Johnson as Janet Smith
- Michael Franklin as James Johnson
- Harvey B. Jackson LAPD Ofc. Murphy
- Terrell Clayton as Dr. Morris
- Tremayne Norris as Sam
- Rene Aranda as Hostess
- Daniel J. Johnson as Kevin Smith
- Jaime Alvarez as Detective Ronald Rodriguez
- Jessica Jarrell as Jenny
- Vincent Rivera as Michael Esposito
- LaRita Shelby as Randall

== Reception ==
The Stepmother received negative reviews from critics. Niela Orr of The New York Times wrote article titled "Tubi Is Reviving a Lost Joy: Watching Really, Really Bad Movies" criticized production values writing: "The second of three “The Stepmother” films, a Tubi Original directed by Chris Stokes, features a flabbergasting continuity error in which the actor playing a security guard changes multiple times in one scene, despite one actor’s having a short Afro and the other’s wearing braids." Movie Ranker gave it a 2 out of 10 stars writing: "‘The Stepmother’ is completely absent of any visual flourishes or unique identity. The family house looks like one of those fully furnished demo homes, untouched and never lived-in. Beyond that, Stokes does nothing of visual or aesthetic interest, resulting in scenes that look flat, uninspired, and empty of any meaningful color palette. There is no style to speak of here. Every frame of the film is essentially shouting at the audience that it’s been made quickly, cheaply, and without passion."
