= Body (Marques Houston song) =

Single by Marques Houston

from the album Mr. Houston
- Released: September 22, 2009
- Genre: R&B
- Length: 4:45
- Label: TUG; Universal
- Songwriters: Noel Fisher; Marques Houston; Christopher Brian Stokes
- Producer: Detail

Music video
- "Body" on YouTube

"Body" is a song recorded by American R&B singer Marques Houston. It is the second single from Houston's fourth studio album Mr. Houston, and was released in parallel to the single "Sunset".

== Music video ==
A music video for "Body" was released in August 2009 at the same time that the video for the single "Sunset" was released. The video was directed by Kevin Shulman.

== Chart performance ==
Chart (2009)	Peak position
US Hot R&B/Hip-Hop Songs (Billboard)	59
