= Tanee McCall =

American actress and dancer

- Born: April 17, 1981 (age 45); Los Angeles, California, U.S.
- Occupations: Actress, dancer
- Years active: 2003–present
- Spouse: Columbus Short (m. 2005; div. 2013)
- Children: 1

Tanee McCall (born April 17, 1981) is an American actress and dancer notable for her appearance as the lead in music videos as well as her role as Toya in You Got Served.

== Filmography ==
- Brother's Blood (2016)
- Burlesque (2010) as Scarlett
- The Losers (2010) as Jolene
- Coastal Dreams (TV series, 2007) as Stacey
- Hairspray (2007) as Dynamite
- The Shield (2006, 1 episode "Rap Payback") as Liberty
- All of Us (2005, 1 episode "Kiss, Kiss, Pass") as Christina
- Coach Carter (2005) as Dancer #1
- Starsky & Hutch (2004) as Dancer #1
- You Got Served (2004) as Toya
- Looney Tunes: Back in Action (2003) as Dancer #1

== Music videos ==
- Marques Houston's Clubbin feat. Joe Budden (2003)
- Marques Houston's That Girl (2003)

== Tours ==
- I Am... World Tour (2009)
- The Scream Tour 3 (2002)
- The Scream Tour 2 (2001)
