= Sacrifice (TV series) =

American thriller television series

- Genre: Thriller
- Created by: Chris Stokes
- Starring: Paula Patton; Juan Antonio; V. Bozeman; Altonio Jackson; Nelson Bonilla; Erica Ash; Marques Houston
- Country of origin: United States
- Original language: English
- No. of seasons: 2
- No. of episodes: 17

Production
- Executive producers: Chris Stokes; Kevin Arkadie; Marques Houston
- Camera setup: Multiple camera
- Running time: 40–50 minutes
- Production company: Footage Films

Original release
- Network: BET+
- Release: November 4, 2021

Sacrifice is an American thriller television series that premiered on BET+ as a pilot movie on December 19, 2019, followed by the official series premiere on November 4, 2021. The second season premiered on Paramount+ on September 30, 2026.

== Plot ==
Protagonist Daniella Hernandez (an entertainment lawyer) navigates through the lives of her rich and scandalous Hollywood clients. Along the journey, she also make discoveries about her own past.

== Cast and characters ==
=== Main ===
- Paula Patton as Daniella Hernandez
- Juan Antonio as Dominiq Mayfield aka Big Dom
- V. Bozeman as Tamika Bland
- Altonio Jackson as Steven Somwon
- Nelson Bonilla as Miguel Costas
- Erica Ash as Beverly Rucker
- Marques Houston as Jason Pratt

=== Recurring ===
- Liliana Montenegro as Gabriella Hernandez
- Josué Gutierrez as Oscar Baptiste
- Frankie Smith as Chauncey Winchester
- GG Townson as Jameson Howard
- Tedrick Martin as Jameson’s Bodyguard
- Ashlei Lewis as Jameson’s MUA and best friend
- Clifton Powell as Sylvester
- Lamman Rucker as Jazzico
- Richard Roundtree as Ellis Shaw
- Vanessa Bell Calloway as Carol Steinburg

=== Guest ===
- Michael Toland as Arnold Lang
- James Trevena as Joshua Lang

== Episodes ==
=== Series overview ===
Season	Episodes	Originally released		
Season	Episodes	First released	Last released	Network
Film		December 19, 2019		
1	10	November 4, 2021		BET+
2	10	September 30, 2026	November 25, 2026	Paramount+

=== Film (2019) ===
Title	Directed by	Written by	Original release date	BET air date	U.S. linear viewers (millions)
"Sacrifice"	Chris Stokes	Chris Stokes	December 19, 2019	September 28, 2021	0.28

=== Season 1 (2021) ===
No.	Title	Directed by	Written by	Original release date	BET air date	U.S. linear viewers (millions)
1	"Rescue Me"	Oz Scott	Kevin Arkadie	November 4, 2021	August 17, 2022	0.38
2	"Mama Didn't Lie"	Oz Scott	Kevin Arkadie	November 4, 2021	August 17, 2022	0.37
3	"Rage to Survive"	Jill Carter	Antonia March & Jacqueline McKinley	November 4, 2021	August 24, 2022	0.37
4	"The "In" Crowd"	Jill Carter	Art Monterastelli	November 4, 2021	August 24, 2022	0.35
5	"Oh, What a Night"	Oz Scott	Marcus J. Guillory	November 4, 2021	August 31, 2022	0.32
6	"Blues with a Feeling"	Oz Scott	Chris Stokes	November 4, 2021	August 31, 2022	0.36
7	"Down in the Bottom"	Crystle Roberson	Pia Wilson	November 4, 2021	September 7, 2022	0.30
8	"Reconsider Baby"	Crystle Roberson	Gabrielle Fulton Ponder	November 4, 2021	September 7, 2022	0.25
9	"Don't You Lie to Me"	Mary Lou Belli	Brandon Tanori & Angela Trevino	November 4, 2021	September 14, 2022	0.33
10	"Don't Mess Up a Good Thing"	Mary Lou Belli	Kevin Arkadie & Antonia March & Jacqueline McKinley	November 4, 2021	September 14, 2022	0.24

== Production ==
=== Development ===
On August 15, 2019, a movie pilot titled Sacrifice was announced. The movie premiered on December 19, 2019. The series was picked up by BET+ on September 28, 2020. The series premiered on November 4, 2021. Even though a second season was ordered and filmed in 2022, it did not premiere until September 30, 2026, on Paramount+.

=== Casting ===
The main cast was revealed on August 15, 2019. On August 16, 2021, Frankie Smith was cast in a recurring role. On October 21, 2021, GG Townson was cast in a recurring role.
