= That Girl (Marques Houston song) =

Single by Marques Houston

from the album MH
- Released: March 26, 2003
- Genre: R&B
- Length: 3:36
- Label: TUG
- Songwriter(s): Kowan "Q" Paul; Patrick "J. Que" Smith; Shaffer Smith; Milton Davis
- Producer(s): Paul

Marques Houston singles chronology
"That Girl" (2003)	"Clubbin'" (2003)

"That Girl" is the debut solo single from R&B singer Marques Houston and the first taken from his debut album, MH in the US. In the UK, however, "Clubbin'" was released there as the first single from the album.

"That Girl" was originally for Ne-Yo, who co-wrote it, but after Columbia Records dropped him, the song was given to Houston. The song was his first single to chart on the Billboard Hot 100, peaking at number sixty-three in the US.

The single was due to be the fourth single from MH in the UK, however, due to the underperformance of the third single there, "Because of You", the single was cancelled, despite the video being serviced to television music channels there. The remix features singer R. Kelly.

== Music video ==
A music video for "That Girl" was shot in Los Angeles, California in February 2003. It starts out with word "That Girl" then "starring Marques Houston". The lead in the music video starring opposite Houston was long time principal dancer for B2K and IMx, Tanee McCall.

== Charts ==
Weekly chart performance for "That Girl"
Chart (2006)	Peak position
US Billboard Hot 100	63
US Hot R&B/Hip-Hop Songs (Billboard)	24
