= Mattress Music =

2010 album by Marques Houston

Studio album by Marques Houston
- Released: September 14, 2010
- Recorded: 2009–2010
- Genre: R&B
- Length: 42:31
- Labels: MusicWorks Ent.; EMI
- Producers: Marques Houston; Eric Cire; Omarion

Marques Houston chronology
Mr. Houston (2009)	Mattress Music (2010)	Famous (2013)

Singles from Mattress Music
- 1. "Kickin' & Screamin'" Released: March 2, 2010; 2. "Pullin' on Her Hair" Released: June 22, 2010

Mattress Music is the fifth studio album by American R&B singer Marques Houston. It was released by MusicWorks Entertainment and EMI on September 14, 2010. The album's lead single is "Kickin' & Screamin'," which peaked at number 71 on the Billboard Hot R&B/Hip-Hop Songs chart. The second single is "Pullin' on Her Hair," featuring rapper Rick Ross.

Professional ratings
Review scores
Source	Rating
Allmusic	2/5 stars

== Track listing ==
All tracks are written by Eric Crawford, Marques Houston, and Chris Stokes, except where noted. All songs produced by Eric "Cire" Crawford, Chris Stokes, and Marques Houston, except "Waterfall", which contains additional production by Omari Grandberry.

No.	Title	Writer(s)	Length
1.	"Mattress Music"		4:18
2.	"Pullin' on Her Hair" (featuring Rick Ross)	Crawford; Houston; Stokes; William Roberts	3:44
3.	"Kickin' & Screamin'"		3:36
4.	"Mess"		3:17
5.	"Noize"		4:38
6.	"Swag Sex" (featuring Soulja Boy)	Crawford; Houston; Stokes; DeAndre Way	3:24
7.	"He Ain't Me"		4:01
8.	"High Notes"		3:42
9.	"Ghetto Angel"		3:33
10.	"Explosion"		4:07
11.	"Waterfall"		4:11

== Charts ==
Chart (2010)	Peak position
US Billboard 200	71
US Independent Albums (Billboard)	14
US Top R&B/Hip-Hop Albums (Billboard)	14
