= I Love Her =

Single by Marques Houston featuring Jim Jones

from the album Mr. Houston
- Released: June 30, 2009
- Recorded: 2009
- Genre: R&B
- Length: 3:37
- Label: TUG; Universal
- Songwriter(s): Marques Houston; Joseph Jones; Joaquin Bynum; Chris Stokes; Charles Hinshaw; Ivondia Cannon
- Producer(s): Marques Houston; J Bynum

Marques Houston singles chronology
"Always & Forever" (2008)	"I Love Her" (2009)	"Sunset" (2009)

Jim Jones singles chronology
"Dancin On Me" (2009)	"I Love Her" (2009)	"Move" (2009)

"I Love Her" is a song recorded by American R&B singer Marques Houston. It is the first single from Houston's fourth studio album Mr. Houston. The song features a rap verse from American rapper Jim Jones.

== Chart performance ==
Chart (2008)	Peak position
U.S. Billboard Hot R&B/Hip-Hop Songs	85
