= Rene Aranda =

American singer and actress (born 1990)

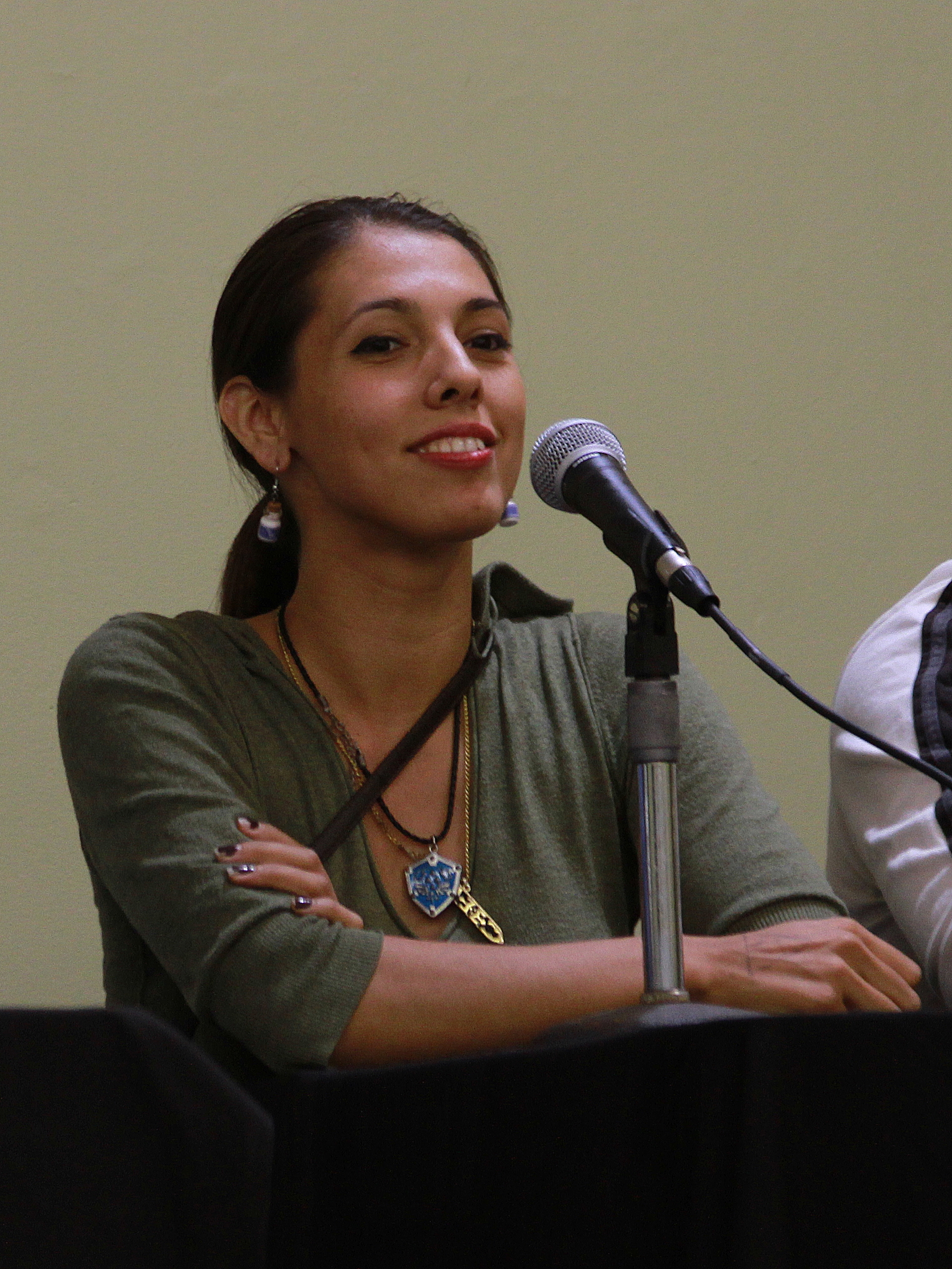
- Aranda in 2018
- Born: Rene Michelle Aranda; December 6, 1990 (age 35); Whittier, California
- Other names: Ren
- Occupations: Actress, singer
- Years active: 2011–present
- Known for: Papa
- Family: Michael Aranda (brother)
- Website: renearanda.com

Rene Michelle Aranda, sometimes credited as Ren Aranda, (born December 6, 1990) is an American actress and singer, best known for Searching and Midnight in the Switchgrass. She has won Best Actress (Silverstate Film Festival, 2018), Best Supporting Actress (LA Edge Film Awards, 2018) and Outstanding Performance by an Actress (Kennedy Center ACT Festival) and finished as a semifinalist in the John F. Kennedy Center for the Performing Arts Center's Irene Ryan scholarship program.

== Early life and family ==
Aranda was born in Whittier, California, to Frank and Cheryl Aranda. She was raised in the nearby city of Chino Hills, where Aranda grew up with older brother Michael Aranda (YouTube creator and musician), older sister Sara Ann Aranda and younger brother Frank Nathan Aranda. Her mother was a self produced singer/songwriter through CD Baby and secretary to the college dean of Natural Sciences and Mathematics at Cal State Fullerton until she died June 27, 2009, after a seven-year battle with breast cancer.

== Career ==
=== 2009–2012: Vocational training ===
Aranda is an alumnus of the Los Angeles City College Theater Academy, a three-year, audition-only acting conservatory at which Morgan Freeman, Mark Hamill, Cindy Williams and Bette Davis studied. Just before graduating in 2012, she won the national award "Outstanding Performance by an Actress" in the Kennedy Center American College Theater Festival for her role as Willy the Space Freak in a gender-bent adaptation of Sam Shepard's The Unseen Hand.

For her role as "Van's Sister" in LACC's stage production of Bert V. Royal's Dog Sees God: Confessions of a Teenage Blockhead in 2010, Aranda was nominated for the John F. Kennedy Center for the Performing Arts Irene Ryan scholarship, for which actors compete as a part of the Kennedy Center American College Theater Festival. She made it to the semi-finals.

=== 2013–2014: Early career ===
First invited to the set of network Cinelatino distributed film Smile Now Cry Later as a background actor by a fellow Theater Academy alum, Aranda was later asked to replace a crew member on a subsequent film before being locked in for two more features (Fighting Chance and Cherry Red Kiss) and by the fourth production (Until the Day I Die), she served the company Plus Entertainment as an in-house producer, appearing on screen in each title she helped produce.

Aranda was featured with touring architect Alán Ramiro Manning in the Woodbury University Neo-Tribes Runway Event on May 1 and 2 2013, donning a Jenny Erin Davis (Black Lightning) design of a Bram Stoker's Dracula inspired Elisabeta (Transylvania 1462), wearing Stila makeup.

=== 2018: Music ===
In addition to her film and television career, Aranda debuted as a musical artist in 2018, releasing two pop singles a few months apart on Spotify, iTunes, iHeartRadio and other online streaming platforms.

== Health ==
In February 2024, Aranda was diagnosed with a BRCA1 mutation, which affects the tumor suppressor gene and increases the risk of certain cancers. Later that year, she was also diagnosed with high-grade Ductal carcinoma in situ (DCIS), an aggressive type of breast cancer. She has since undergone multiple surgeries to remove and prevent cancer growth, and has shared her & her sister's experiences publicly on social media, advocating for awareness about genetic testing of hereditary cancers.

== Youth programs and education ==
Aranda is a regular volunteer reader and occasional coordinator for Reading to Kids, and ran on the foundation's charity relay team in the Los Angeles Marathon in 2016.

She also participates as a volunteer actor in Young Storytellers "Big Show" productions.

== Filmography ==
=== Film ===
Year	Title	Role	Notes
2011	For a Reason	Eva	Short
2012	Wake-up Call	Iris	Short
2012	Sin_Eater	Rebeka	Short
2013	Smile Now Cry Later	-	
2013	Fellatio Is Fo Suckas	Rene the Sweet	Short
2013	The Pain Killers	Elise	
2013	It's Dark Here	Funeral Mourner	
2013	The Mountain	-	Short
2014	The Unexpected Guest	Amy Flint	Short
2014	Cutting Corners 2	-	Short
2014	Fatty	Student	Short
2014	The Tragedy of Petey Pompeii	Kate	Short
2014	Contest	Melanie	Short
2014	Expelled	Police Officer	
2014	Frankenchick	Mad Scientist	Short
2014	Sins of a Call Girl	Diner Patron	
2014	Fighting Chance	Sabrina	
2014	Cherry Red Kiss	Eva Alvarez	
2015	A Family Affair	Paula	Short
2015	Suckas Fo Fellatio	Rene The Sweet	Short
2015	Violet	Femke Klebb	Short
2015	Faraar	SWAT	
2015	Relentless	Rachel	Short
2015	A Lesson in Love	-	Short
2015	D.O.P: The Director of Photography	Mad Scientist	Short
2015	Performance Art	Lana	Short
2016	Until the Day I Die: Part 1	Officer Bracamontes	
2016	The Fertile Fiend from Outer Space	Rachel	Short
2016	Until the Day I Die: Part 2	Cholita	
2016	Stories for the Fire	Kitty	Short
2016	I Know Where Lizzie Is	EMT	TV movie
2016	A Killer Walks Amongst Us	-	
2016	2 Lava 2 Lantula!	S.W.A.T.	
2016	Black Flag	S.W.A.T.	Short
2016	Shadows of the Dead	Police Officer	
2016	Like the First Time	Elle	Short
2016	Inspired to Kill	Inmate	TV movie
2016	Christmas with the Andersons	Police Officer	TV movie
2016	The Green Fairy	Mrs. Ferrer	
2016	Selfish	Party Guest	Short
2017	Try Hard	Veronica	Short
2017	Open Mic	-	Short
2017	Destruction: Los Angeles	Police Officer	
2017	A View from the Mountain	Lucy	Short
2017	UniversitE	DEA Agent	Short
2018	Eruption: LA	Army Soldlier	
2018	Frankie	Skater Girl	Short
2018	Searching	Emergency Medical Technician	
2018	Papa	Robin	
2018	When You Lose Someone	-	Short
2018	Woman on the Edge	Police Officer	
2019	The Final Journey of Hartwick Stance	Hartwick's Wife	Short
2019	Debbie & Doug Drop Acid in the Desert	Bunny	Short
2019	The Fanatic	Tourist	
2019	Intolerance: No More	9-11 Operator (voice)	
2019	Boris and the Bomb	Sonia	
2019	12 Pups of Christmas	Alex's Mom	
2020	Sinister Savior	Izzie's House Medic	
2020	Cops Like Us	LAPD Officer Ronnie Aranda	Short
2020	The Undead of the Z West	Undead Farm Girl	Short
2020	Mommy is a Murderer	EMT	
2020	One of These Days	Police Officer #6	Short
2020	Dusters	The Retriever	Short
2020	Open Mic	Couple in Audience	Short
2020	Happy Horror Days	Party Guest	
2020	Peek	Det. Liza Sepps	Short
2021	86 Melrose Ave	Co-Worker in Background	
2021	Blursday	Nurse Rene	
2021	Midnight in the Switchgrass	Prostitute	
2022	Emily or Oscar	Lawyer Laura	
2022	Lizard Brain	Sandy	Short
2022	In Love with My Partner's Wife	Police Officer	TV movie
2022	Tavern Tony Returns	Margarita Girl	Short
2022	Four Hour Layover in Juarez	Valeria	Short
2022	My Nightmare Office Affair	Business Woman	TV movie
2022	The Stepmother 2	Hostess	
2023	Imani	Paramedic	
2023	The Assistant	Couple at Restaurant	
2023	City of Dreams	Girl in Pedicab	
2023	No Way Out	Paramedic	
2023	The Stepmother 3	Paramedic	
2023	Proof Sheet	Female Police Officer/Brothel Worker	
2023	F.L.Y.	Postal Worker (mid credit scene)	TV movie
2023	Night Mistress	Shelly Steele	
2023	In Deep	S.W.A.T	Short
2023	Still Here	Fan Girl	
2023	Mystery Incorporated and the Threshold of Chaos	Thorn (voice)	
2023	Falaq	S.W.A.T.	
2023	Our Broken Family	Amy	
2024	Upon Waking	Paramedic	
2024	The Disinvited	Sarah	
2024	Somnium	Victim #3	
2024	Holy Cash	Sinner	
2025	The Demon Detective	The Reader	
2025	Ofrenda	Self	Documentary short

=== Television ===
Year	Title	Role	Notes
2014	HitRecord on TV	Herself	Episode: "RE: Fantasy"
2014-2018	WhatImDoingRightNow	Herself	Michael Aranda's vlog, 9 episodes
2015	Tabloid	Bracamontes/ S.W.A.T	2 episodes
2016	Murder Among Friends	Officer Mejia	Episode: "Unholy Friends"
2016	Take My Wife	Hotel Patron	Episode: "Holiday Special"
2016	Dangerous Games		
2016-2017	Blood Relatives	Police Officer	2 episodes
2016-2017	Ryan Hansen Solves Crimes on Television	Paramedic	Scene Deleted
2017	Germany's Next Top Model	Herself	3 episodes
2017	Betrayed	Police Officer/ S.W.A.T.	3 episodes
2017	Extreme Measures	CSI	Episode: "Oh Mother, Where Art Thou?"
2019	Intrigue	Jury	
2019	CollegeHumor Originals: Kingpin Katie	Officer	Episode 8
2019	CryptTV: Fight Night	Spectator	
2021	Nova Vita	Nurse Julie	3 episodes
2023	Double Cross	Patient	AllBlk Original Series

=== Music videos ===
Year	Song	Artist	Role
2014	All About You	Ray Castle	Interviewer
2016	JoHn Muir	ScHoolboy Q	Police Officer
2016	One Time Comin'	YG	Police Officer
2016	Let You Go	Bobo Norco feat. The Promise	Police Officer
2017	High Spirits	Pierre	Lead
2017	Math	Quin	EMT
2018	Need You Anymore	Patrick Nuo	Dancer
2018	Evidence	Bashrock	Girlfriend
2019	Stay Broke	Tokyo Yens	Inmate
2019	No Sudden Moves	Julia Nunes	Hand Dancer
2020	We Can Make Up	Guy Tang	LGBTQ+ Couple
2021
2021	Rap Demigod	Dax	Police Officer
2021	Suffocating	Dax	Rapper Entourage
2022	I Dance	YG feat. "Duki" & "Cuco"	Guest

== Awards and nominations ==
Year	Award	Category	Film	Result
2010	Irene Ryan (KCACTF)	Acting	Dog Sees God: Confessions of a Teenage Blockhead	Semifinalist
2012	Outstanding Performance by an Actress (KCACTF)	Acting	The Unseen Hand	Won
2018	LA Edge Film Awards	Best Supporting Actress	A View From the Mountain (short)	Won
2018	Silverstate Film Festival	Best Actress	A View From the Mountain (short)	Won
2019	Rising Star	Industry Award		Won
