= Blokhedz =

Comic book series

Publication information
- Publisher: Street Legends Ink
- Publication date: 2003
- Main character: Blak

Creative team
- Written by: Madtwiinz; Brandon Schultz
- Artist: Madtwiinz

Blokhedz is an independent comic book/graphic novel series created by the Madtwiinz, Mark and Mike Davis. Since the release of Issue #1 in 2003, the 4-book comic series has developed a small but dedicated underground fanbase. It is characterized by a gritty style, and its "unflinching" look at the harsh realities of inner city life.

In February 2009, the creators announced a partnership with Gatorade to create an animated web-series for Blokhedz. The trailer and webisodes can be viewed on Gatorade's Mission G website. Talib Kweli plays the main character, Young Blak. Lauren London plays Essence, Blak's love interest. Bobbito García plays Eatho, the smart Puerto Rican b baller. Gary Sturgis plays Biskit, the leader of the biker gang, Wild Dawgs. Dorian Harewood plays King Tubby, the Rastafarian store owner technician.

== Mission G episodes descriptions ==
Episode 1 "thinking of a Master Plan"

Set in mythical, gang-ridden streets of Empire City, BLOKHEDZ is the animated story of a teenage rapper, Blak. With the help of his crew, “G-Pak, Blak fights off temptations of the streets and dreams of making it big in the rap game. But when he gets caught in the middle of a crime lord-turned-media-mogul’s plan to control the city, Blak discovers his rhymes have supernatural abilities. Will Blak stay true to himself and use his magical gifts for good? Or will he be lured into using them for evil. The fate of Empire City hangs in the balance.

Episode 2 "Paid In Full"

BLOKHEDZ: In their attempt to hustle up some loot to repair Audio 2, G-Pak takes it to the basketball courts, but the local biker gang, The Wild Dawgs, has other ideas.

Episode 3 "Pump up the Volume"

BLOKHEDZ chronicles the saga of young Blak, a 17-year-old superhero in the form of an aspiring rapper, blessed with the gift of turning rhymes to reality. In act three, Blak and Flash dodge the Wild Dawgs, meet the lovely Essence (voiced by Lauren London), and get confronted by a crew of shadow traveling thugs. Will the G-Pak escape the clutches of the Wild Dawgs? Even if they do, does Blak have any chance of surviving the vicious Dungeons of Rap?

== Publication ==
- Genesis (112 pages, March 2007, Pocket Books, ISBN 1-4165-4073-3)
- Volume 2 (112 pages, June 2008, Pocket Books, ISBN 1-4165-4211-6)

== Awards ==
- Glyph Awards: Rising Star Award for Best Self-Publisher
- New York Public Library’s Books for the Teen Age 2008.
- YALSA 2008 Quick Pick Nomination
