= Dance Fu =

- Directed by: Cedric the Entertainer
- Written by: Kel Mitchell; Janice Woody
- Produced by: Eric C. Rhone; Janis Woody; Kel Mitchell; Mathew Gray
- Starring: Kel Mitchell; Katerina Graham; Cedric the Entertainer; Tommy Davidson; Ty Hodges; Affion Crockett; Gary Anthony Sturgis; Jennifer D. Johnson
- Cinematography: Marc Shap
- Edited by: David L. Bertman
- Music by: Ralph Hawkins, Jr. Bud'da
- Production company: A Bird & a Bear Entertainment
- Distributed by: Level 33 Entertainment
- Release date: October 4, 2011
- Running time: 89 minutes
- Country: United States
- Language: English

Dance Fu (also titled Chicago Pulaski Jones and Chicago Pulaski Jones: The Legend of Dance Fu) is a 2011 martial arts comedy film starring Kel Mitchell. The film was co-written and co-produced by Mitchell and directed by Cedric the Entertainer, which is his directorial debut. It was released straight to DVD on October 4, 2011. In the film, Mitchell plays two roles: a young dancer named Chicago Pulaski Jones and a villain named Pretty-Eyed Willy. Cedric the Entertainer makes a cameo appearance as a homicide detective. Other cast members include Katerina Graham, Affion Crockett and Tommy Davidson.

== Plot ==
Chicago Pulaski Jones is a young championship dancer and choreographer from Chicago who has recently been hired to work at his uncle Daddy J's club in Hollybank. While at the club, he reunites with a childhood friend and singer, Chaka. When his uncle is murdered by his nemesis, Pretty-Eyed Willy, for refusing to sell his club, Chicago swears vengeance. His initial attempt is unsuccessful, as he is only beaten senseless by Pretty-Eyed Willy's men. Before they can do any further damage the men are stopped by an elderly martial arts expert, Julius Ho, however Chicago is assumed to be dead. Pretty-Eyed Willy then takes over Daddy J's club and forces Chaka to sing for him.

Julius takes Chicago into his home and begins teaching him kung-fu so he can defeat Pretty-Eyed Willy, a former student of Julius. He is unable to teach Chicago traditional kung fu, however Julius notices that his dance moves are nearly identical to the martial art. Julius tests Chicago, who is able to block every move. His only weakness is that he can only fight if there is music playing. Julius later fights one of Pretty-Eyed Willy's men, but is stabbed in the process. Chicago manages to defeat the man since there is music playing and comforts a dying Julius, who tells him that there is music all around him.

Chicago goes off in search of Pretty-Eyed Willy, who by this point is aware that Chicago is still alive. He is successful in defeating several of Pretty-Eyed Willy's goons, but is taken down by a crack addict who alerts the boss to Chicago's capture. Before Pretty-Eyed Willy can arrive, Chicago manages to escape after hearing some faint music. He continues his search for Pretty-Eyed Willy and beats up several of his fighters, during which the villain learns of Chicago's weakness.

Chicago manages to find Pretty-Eyed Willy, who has kidnapped Chaka and knocked her out. This angers Chicago, but he is unable to fight due to a lack of music. He is knocked to the ground by Pretty-Eyed Willy and falls unconscious. While he is out, Chicago recalls Julius's words and realizes that the sounds of the world around him make a musical beat. This allows him to fight and ultimately defeat Pretty-Eyed Willy. The film ends with Chicago becoming a couple with Chaka and running his uncle's club. Pretty-Eyed Willy is shown in the morgue. He is resurrected but is confused as to why he is naked.

== Cast ==
- Kel Mitchell as Chicago Pulaski Jones / Pretty-Eyed Willy
- Katerina Graham as Chaka Lovebell
- Gary Anthony Sturgis as Daddy J
- Cedric the Entertainer as Detective
- Ty Hodges as Jamal
- Tommy Davidson as Addict
- Affion Crockett as Julius Ho
- Craig Lamar Traylor as Lil' Ryat
- Jennifer D. Johnson as Vendetta
- Bigg Slice as Lamont
- Cecelia Antoinette as Mable
- Rodney Perry as Mayor Pope
- Kristian Bernard as DJ Rough Knuckles
- Gerald Neal Allen II as Pipe
- Dometi Pongo as Artist performing during Intro of the Movie
- Jenaé Williams (Ms. Williams) as La'Shay

== Production ==
Plans to film Dance Fu were announced in 2008. Filming began in Los Angeles, California that same year and Cedric the Entertainer was brought on to direct, marking his feature film directorial debut. Kel Mitchell was announced as the lead actor for the film, then titled Chicago Pulaski Jones. Mitchell also served as the film's screenwriter alongside Janis Woody.

Cedric the Entertainer noted that he intended to release it as a "small DVD and digital release" in order to "create this model for independent filmmakers to be able to kind of get their films done for low, economic prices."

== Release ==
Dance Fu was initially slated to release in 2009, but had its release date pushed back until it released on October 4, 2011.

== Reception ==
Grantland criticized Dance Fu, stating that people should watch it "When you feel like not enjoying a movie about dancing, and you also feel like not enjoying a movie about kung fu, but only have time to watch one of them."
