= Gary Anthony Sturgis =

American actor

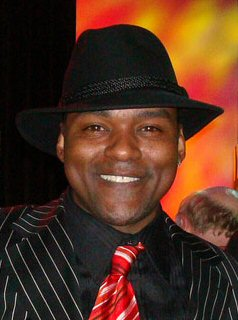
- Sturges in February 2008
- Born: Gary Anthony Sturgis; November 3, 1966 (age 59); New Orleans, Louisiana, U.S.
- Other name: Gary Sturgis
- Occupations: Actor; musician; writer; teacher; entrepreneur
- Years active: 1986–present

Gary Anthony Sturgis (born November 3, 1966) is an American actor, musician, writer, teacher and entrepreneur, known for his role as Bar Patron and other characters in the television series America's Most Wanted, and for providing the voice of Ebon in the animated series Static Shock. He is also known by the rap moniker of Illuminati, having successfully promoted a few albums on iTunes.

== Early life ==
Sturgis was born in New Orleans, Louisiana, and is the second oldest son of four born to Abraham and Sarah Sturgis. He grew up in the Ninth Ward of New Orleans, Louisiana, and attended McDonogh Senior High School where he played piccolo and served as drum major for the band. After writing an essay for a class assignment expressing his love and desire for acting, a teacher invited him to a table read for a play, and Sturgis was cast as the understudy; later going on to play the lead role of A Raisin in the Sun.

== Career ==
Sturgis made his acting debut in the romantic thriller film The Big Easy (1986). He later starred in the film Blaze (1989) as Marquez' Son.

Sturgis later appeared as an antagonist in two of Tyler Perry's films, Diary of a Mad Black Woman (2005) and Daddy's Little Girls (2007), as well as the film Pride (2007), starring Terrence Howard, and co-stars in the independent feature directed by Cedric the Entertainer, Chicago Pulaski Jones. He landed television roles in his early career such as a recurring character by the name of Caz in the General Hospital spin-off, Port Charles, as well as smaller roles on The District, NYPD Blue, Malcolm and Eddie and Girlfriends.

In the mid-1990s, he began booking voice-over jobs in commercials and trailers. He served as the voice of the Monday night (and later Tuesday night) lineup on the now defunct UPN network, promoting such series as The Parkers, Moesha, Half & Half, Girlfriends, The Hughleys and many others. Simultaneously in 1997 and 1998, he was also the daily announcer for the late night talk show, VIBE, starring Chris Spencer and later, comedian Sinbad. Sturgis never had a contract for either job stating that he would just "keep coming everyday until they tell me to stop." This lasted for the duration of the network and the talk show respectively.

Sturgis appeared on the cover of The Hollywood Reporter in 2002 in celebration of his voice over efforts. In addition to promos for network television, he also did several Hollywood film trailers such as Bones, The Wood, Crossroads, Two Can Play That Game, and The Others.

Sturgis was interviewed by fashion editor Antoine Von Boozier exclusively for Floss Magazine. The interview was published on March 7, 2016.

Sturgis played several animated roles landing himself in cartoons, feature films and in video games. A partial list includes, Static Shock, Avatar: The Last Airbender, Scooby-Doo and the Cyber Chase, Batman Beyond, Batman: The Brave and the Bold and The Fairly OddParents: Wishology. Video game titles include Shout About Music, True Crime: New York City, Evil Dead, Spider-Man 2, Red Faction, and Batman: Arkham Origins Blackgate. In February 2009, he worked on Blokhedz animated web series on Missiong.com and did the voice of Biskit, the leader of the biker gang Wild Dawgs.

In October 2008, Sturgis began working as a staff writer for Tyler Perry Studios on the series Tyler Perry's House of Payne and Meet the Browns, both on TBS. This would mark his first professional writing job. His first credited episode of Tyler Perry's House of Payne aired on December 16, 2008. Outside of acting, he works as a musician, writer, teacher, and entrepreneur.

== Filmography ==
=== Film ===
Year	Title	Role	Notes
1986	The Big Easy	Car Vandel #1	
1989	Blaze	Marquez' Son	
1994	Virtuosity	Officer at Video Store	
1995	Tornado Run	Pilot	
1997	Volcano	Homeless Man in Park	Uncredited
2001	Scooby-Doo and the Cyber Chase	Phantom Virus (voice)	Direct-to-video
2005	The Crib	Rapping Mike	Short film
2005	Diary of a Mad Black Woman	Jamison Milton Jackson	
2007	Daddy's Little Girls	Joe	
2007	Pride	Franklin	
2009	The Adventure of Umbweki	Pretty Tony	
2010	A Gang Land Love Story	Paul Revere	
2011	Joshua Tree	Darryl	
2011	Dance Fu	Daddy J	
2012	Battlefield America	Eric Smith Sr.	
2012	The Devil Is My Witness	Larcen	Short film
2012	Batman: The Dark Knight Returns	Silk (voice)	Direct-to-video
2013	Day of Redemption	Daryl	
2014	Justice League: War	Teammate #2 (voice)	Direct-to-video
2015	Lucky Girl	Darnell Riggins Sr.	
2016	Dirty	Detective Bishop	
2016	Hav Faith	Xavier Dunbar	
2017	CainAbel	Adam	
2017	Busted	Nathan	
2018	We Belong Together	Jefferson	
2018	The Stuff	Sonny	
2018	Everything That Glitters	Carl Robinson	
2018	Ole Bryce	Malcolm Wyatt	
2020	The Regiment		

=== Television ===
Year	Film	Role	Notes
1988–1989	America's Most Wanted: America Fights Back	Bar Patron, Lee Nell Carter's victim, Leroy Carter	TV documentary series; 3 episodes
1996	High Society	Paramedic	Episode: "Alice Doesn't Pump Here Anymore"
1996	NYPD Blue	Larry Blueford	Episode: "Yes, We Have No Cannolis"
1997	Chicago Sons	Waiter	Episode: "A Foursome Is Not Necessarily a Good Thing"
1997	Malcolm & Eddie	Richard	Episode: "The Commercial"
1997	High Incident	Unknown role	Episode: "Excessive Force"
1997	Extreme Ghostbusters	Roland (voice)	Episode: "Darkness at Noon: Part 1"; uncredited
2000–2004	Static Shock	Ivan Evans / Ebon, Duke (voice)	10 episodes
2000–2001	Batman Beyond	Kobra Driver, Howard Reubens, Punk	3 episodes
2001	The District	Henry G. Charters, Officer Cory Willis	2 episodes
2003	Port Charles	Caz	11 episodes
2005	Teen Titans	Trogaar (voice)	Episode: "Go"
2006	Avatar: The Last Airbender	Gow (voice)	Episode: "Zuko Alone"
2008	Girlfriends	Contractor	Episode: "Adapt to Adopt"
2008–2009	K-9 Cops	Narrator (voice)	16 episodes
2009	Meet the Browns	Teddy, Theodore	Episode: "Meet the Dangerous and the Deadline"; Also writer
2009	House of Payne	Mr. Orlando	Episode: "Slightly Payneful Truth"; Also writer
2009	Batman: The Brave and the Bold	Bronze Tiger (voice)	Episode: "Return of the Fearsome Fangs!"
2009	The Fairly OddParents	Lead Eliminator, Destructinator, Huginator (voice)	Episode: "Wishology"
2012	The Soul Man	Parishioner	Episode: "Lost in the Move"
2012–2013	Hot in Cleveland	Officer Davenport, Cop	2 episodes
2014	Beware the Batman	Guard (voice)	Episode: "Attraction"
2015	Will to Love	John Hawkins	Television film
2016	The Sin Within	James Morris	4 episodes
2018	5th Ward	Blue	6 episodes
2019	The Probe	Nard	Television film
2020	Pole Magic	Terrance Coleman	

=== Video games ===
Year	Title	Role	Notes	Source
1994	Corpse Killer	Fleming		
2001	Scooby-Doo and the Cyber Chase	Phantom Virus		
2002	Spider-Man	Kraven the Hunter, Dr. Rue		
2002	Red Faction 2	Lars Repta		
2003	Evil Dead: A Fistful of Boomstick			
2004	Spider-Man 2	Luke Cage, additional voices		
2005	True Crime: New York City		Credited as Gary Sturgis	
2013	Batman: Arkham Origins Blackgate	Bronze Tiger		

=== Web ===
Year	Title	Role	Notes
2009	Blokhedz	Biskit	Animated web series on Missiong.com
