= Coastal Dreams =

2007 online telenovela

Coastal Dreams is a 24-episode online telenovela produced by NBC in 2007.

The series stars Danica Stewart, Tanee McCall, Elena Campbell-Martinez, Kam Heskin, Charlie Koznick, Ken Luckey, and Noah Schuffman. It centers two women, Zoe and Stacey, whose beach trip takes a perilous turn. Rick Draughon serves as the executive producer, writer, and creator of the series, which is directed by Mark Cole. This show aired every Tuesday and Thursday at nbc.com.

== Synopsis ==
Zoe (Danica Stewart) needs to escape her Texas hometown after her boyfriend attempts to kill her. She grabs her best friend Stacey, and heads to California to visit her wealthy cousin April. They stay in April's seaside mansion and meet April's boyfriend Christian and the local deputy, Will. Things get worse quickly when Zoe starts receiving menacing text messages from her ex-boyfriend and the locals reveal ulterior motives.

== Cast ==
Danica Stewart as Zoe: Hailing from Plano, Texas, Zoe is a jewelry designer. When her boyfriend Sebastian started stalking her and tried to kill her during their senior year of college, she had to get out of Texas. Her cousin April invited Zoe and her best friend Stacey to escape to her house in Pacific Shores, California, for the summer.

Tanee McCall as Stacey: Zoe's lifelong best friend, Stacey is smart and uptight. Stacey plans on working her way through law school, which she's set to start in the fall. Stacey has to find a job to afford the trip to Pacific Shores.

Kam Heskin as April: Ex-model and businesswoman April thinks of Zoe as more of a little sister than a cousin. They spent every summer together as kids, and April in the Fox family's coastal mansion. April's mother left when she was a baby, and her father Gabriel died a few years before the beginning of the series, leaving her an orphan with a billion-dollar fortune.

Charlie Koznick as Christian: Christian is a mysterious surfer who came to Pacific Shores a few summers before the series starts. Having enrolled in the oceanography program at the local college and made friends in Deputy Will Carpenter, Chris works as a carpenter and handyman. He does odd jobs for April, and develops a connection with Zoe.

Ken Luckey as Will: Born and raised in Pacific Shores, Will is easygoing and grew up idolizing his father, the town police chief. Following his dad, Will became a police officer. Will is perpetually unlucky in dating.
