= Marques Houston =

American singer and actor (born 1981)

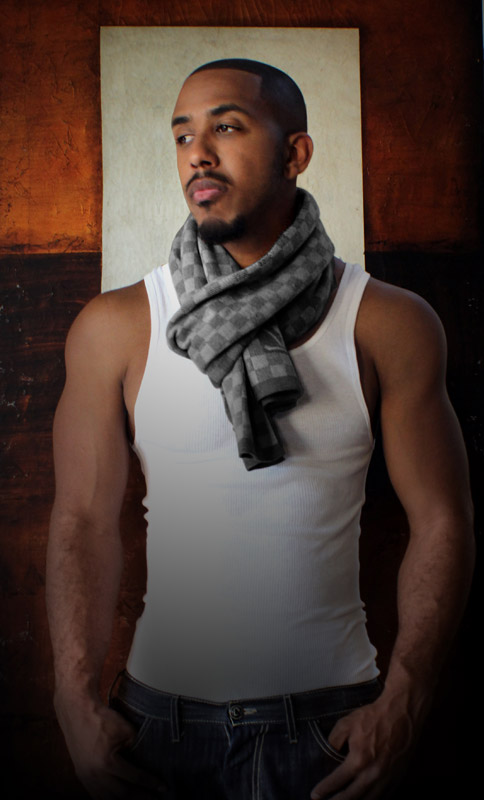
- Houston in 2012
- Born: Marques Barrett Houston; August 4, 1981 (age 45); Los Angeles, California, U.S
- Other names: Batman; Mark
- Occupations: Singer; songwriter; record producer; dancer; actor; model; film producer
- Years active: 1990–present
- Spouse: Miya Dickey (m. 2020)
- Children: 2
- Relatives: J-Boog (cousin)
- Musical career
- Genres: R&B; hip hop
- Instrument: Vocals
- Labels: Silent Partner; MusicWorks; Shanachie; EMI; Fontana; Universal Motown; Atlantic; TUG; Interscope; Elektra; A&M
- Formerly of: IMx

Marques Barrett Houston (born August 4, 1981) is an American R&B singer, songwriter, dancer, and actor. Houston began his singing career in 1990, performing with IMx, and found popularity as an actor for his portrayal of Roger Evans in the teen sitcom Sister, Sister from 1994 to 1999.

== Early life ==
Houston was born on August 4, 1981, in Los Angeles, California, to Michael and Carolyn Houston. Houston's mother died from lymphoma in 1997.

== Music career ==
=== Music beginnings ===
In 1990, Houston became a founding member of the R&B group Immature (also known as IMx). The members of the group include Jerome "Romeo" Jones and Don "Half Pint" Santos (later replaced by Kelton "LDB" Kessee), along with Chris Stokes, who is their manager. During this period, Houston went by the nickname "Batman". In 1999, the group underwent a name change, releasing two albums under the name IMx: Introducing IMx (1999) and IMx (2001). The group also branched out into acting and appeared on shows such as A Different World and Sister, Sister. They recorded songs for soundtracks to the films House Party 3 and House Party 4: Down to the Last Minute, before disbanding in 2002.

=== 2003–2005: MH and Naked ===
In 2003, Houston began pursuing a solo career. Using his birth name, Marques Houston, he released his debut album, MH, on October 21, 2003. The album featured the singles "That Girl", "Clubbin'" (featuring Joe Budden and R. Kelly), "Pop That Booty" (featuring Jermaine Dupri) and "Because of You". In the United States charts, MH peaked at number 20 on the Billboard 200 and at number 5 on Billboard's Top R&B/Hip-Hop Albums. On May 24, 2005, Houston released his second solo album, Naked. The album featured the singles "All Because of You" (featuring Young Rome), "Naked" and "Sex Wit You". In the United States, Naked peaked at number 13 on the Billboard and peaked at number 5 on Billboard's Top R&B/Hip-Hop Albums.

=== 2006–2008: Veteran ===
Houston released his third solo album, Veteran, on March 20, 2007. The album featured the singles "Like This" (featuring Yung Joc), "Favorite Girl", "Circle" and "Wonderful". In the United States, Veteran debuted (and peaked) at number 5 on the Billboard 200 and debuted at number 1 on Billboard's Top R&B/Hip-Hop Albums, marking this release as Houston's first number-one solo album.

=== 2009–2011: Mr. Houston, Mattress Music and IMx reunion ===
Houston released his fourth solo album, Mr. Houston on September 29, 2009. It featured the singles, "I Love Her" and "Sunset". Videos for the album tracks "Body" and "Date" were released online by the singer in 2008. "How I Do" and "Case of You" received video premieres in 2009, followed by a video for "Tonight" in 2010. On September 14, 2010, Houston released his fifth studio album, Mattress Music, which contained the singles "Kickin' & Screamin'" and "Pullin' On Her Hair". A video for a third single, "Ghetto Angel" premiered in 2011. Houston announced on 106 & Park that IMx planned to record another group album together that year. This plan was eventually scrapped.

=== 2012–2013: Famous ===
In October 2012, Houston announced a new studio album, Famous, was slated for release on August 27. Marques released the song "Speechless" as a promotional preview via free digital download. The first single off the album, made available on iTunes, was "Give Your Love a Try" featuring Problem.

=== 2014–present: White Party, soundtracks and Me ===
Following the release of his previous album, Houston reunited with IMx and did some touring. Changing their name back to Immature, the band released a new single called "Let Me Find Out" in late 2014. Their comeback EP titled Remember was released in early 2015. Later that year, Houston released the solo single "Need You" from the soundtrack of his film Will to Love.

In 2016, Houston released a new single "Complete Me" to digital/streaming outlets. He premiered a music video for the song in September. The track was slated to be the first single off his album White Party, set for release later that year. However, this album never materialized. In 2017, Houston recorded a trio of new songs for the film 'Til Death Do Us Part, for which he wrote the screenplay. His song "Together" was released as a single from the soundtrack.

After nine years, Houston released a new album titled Me on February 4, 2022. His follow up EP, Me: Dark Water, was released on November 4, 2022.

On January 9, 2026, Houston released the single "Only Me". He released the single "Hijacked" on April 17, 2026.

== Acting career ==
Houston made his acting debut in the animated comedy film Bebe's Kids (1992) in which he was the voice of Khalil, the leader and oldest child of the titular "Bebe's Kids". Houston later appeared in House Party 3 (1994), where he played a fictional version of himself along with fellow Immature bandmates Jerome "Romeo" Jones and Don "Half Pint" Santos. In the film, they portrayed Kid's trouble-making younger cousins who aspire to become musicians.

Houston's breakthrough role came when he won the part of Roger Evans in the television comedy show Sister, Sister, playing the next-door neighbor of identical twin sisters Tia Landry and Tamera Campbell (Tia and Tamera Mowry). Marques played the role for five of the show's six seasons. The show wrote his character out of the script during the fifth season, but he made a guest appearance in the series finale.

In 1997, he had a brief cameo in the movie "Good Burger", a spin-off from a sketch on the Nickelodeon show "All That" starring Kenan Thompson and Kel Mitchell. He played Jake, Kenan's friend. Houston and his IMx (formerly Immature) band members made an appearance in Destiny's Child's music video for the single "No, No, No Part 1" off their 1998 self-titled debut album.

In 2000, shortly after Houston's run on Sister, Sister ended, Marques had a brief cameo in Destiny's Child's video rendition of The Writing's on the Wall single "Jumpin', Jumpin'" directed by Joseph Kahn.

He also played the character Elgin Barrett Eugene Smith III in the 2004 film You Got Served. Following You Got Served, in both live-action and voice-over, he portrayed Dumb Donald in the film adaptation of Fat Albert, based on Bill Cosby's popular cartoon series Fat Albert and the Cosby Kids.

From 2005 to 2006, Houston starred as Kevin Barnes in his own television series, Cuts, which was a spin-off of One on One. Despite substantial ratings, the show only lasted two seasons due to UPN merging with The WB to become The CW which caused Cuts along with many other UPN shows to get cancelled.

In 2007, Houston starred in the horror film Somebody Help Me. He then starred in the sequel, Somebody Help Me 2, in 2010.

In 2012, Houston starred in a kids hip hop dance battle film, Battlefield America. He portrayed Sean Lewis, an ad executive who serves as a dance teacher after receiving a sentence of community service; however, he does not dance in the film.

In 2015, Houston reunited with Sister, Sister co-star Tamera Mowry on the daytime talk show The Real (also with Tia Mowry in 2017) for two episodes.

He also starred in 2016's A Weekend With The Family, alongside Karrueche Tran.

He later reunited with his IMx bandmates for a brief storyline appearance on Love & Hip Hop: Hollywood in 2019.

== Film producing career ==
Houston began his journey into the behind the scenes world of filmmaking in 2010, partnering with longtime music manager Chris Stokes, who directed most of the films he wrote and produced.

Houston is currently the CEO of a film production company, Footage Films, in California, along with fellow IMx bandmate Young Rome (Jerome Jones) as president and relative Jarell Houston, (J-Boog of B2K) as vice president. Chris Stokes is the chairman of the board and directs the majority of the productions. Marques serves as an executive producer and writer. The majority of the films are mostly made-for-TV features. Following in the paths of filmmakers John Waters, John Singleton and Spike Lee's casting tradition, Houston and Stokes often cast some of their actors more than once in different films portraying different roles. His first full writing and executive producer credit was the 2015 film Will to Love, starring Keisha Knight Pulliam, Draya Michele, and himself, respectively.

He produced a thriller, Running Out of Time, starring Tasha Smith, RonReaco Lee and Telma Hopkins, that aired in December 2018 on BET. Since the start of this new career, he has written and produced over ten films so far, including one he co-wrote with Stokes that was released to theaters in 2017, titled 'Til Death Do Us Part starring Taye Diggs, Stephen Bishop, Annie Ilonzeh and Malik Yoba. Houston produced, wrote and starred in a thriller film alongside Love and Hip Hop star Erica Mena titled "The Stepmother" which premiered on Tubi in June 2022. A sequel was announced in November 2022.

== Personal life ==
=== Religious beliefs ===
He became one of Jehovah's Witnesses in 2016.

=== Relationships ===
Houston married Miya Dickey (b. October 7, 2000), a make-up artist from San Bernardino, California on August 24, 2020, in Corona, California. The two met at a convention for Jehovah's Witnesses in April 2018 and shared a mutual friend in director Chris Stokes. They started dating in October, after Dickey's 18th birthday and he proposed to Dickey in March 2019. They have two children together, a daughter named Zara Denise Houston (b. December 2021) and a son named Greyson Houston (b. December 2023). Houston and Dickey's marriage caused some controversy due to their 19-year age gap, with some demanding he be canceled for predatory behavior. Houston defended their marriage and said that though they met when she was 17 years old, they didn't begin a romantic relationship until she was 18 years old.

Houston previously dated singer Jamila "Mila J" Chilombo.

== Discography ==
Studio albums

- MH (2003)
- Naked (2005)
- Veteran (2007)
- Mr. Houston (2009)
- Mattress Music (2010)
- Famous (2013)
- Me (2022)
- The Best Worst Year Ever (2024)

== Filmography ==
=== Television ===
Year	Title	Role
1993	A Different World	Eli Black
1994–1999	Sister, Sister	Roger Evans and Himself
1995–1997, 2000	All That	5 episodes/credited with his band "Immature/IMx"
1996	Family Matters	Himself
1996	The Parent 'Hood	Himself
2003	Rock Me Baby	Himself
2003	American Dreams	David Ruffin
2004, 2006	One on One	Kevin Barnes
2005–2006	Cuts	Kevin Barnes
2019	Love & Hip Hop: Hollywood	Himself
2021	Sacrifice	Jason Pratt

=== Film ===
Year	Title	Role
1992	Bebe's Kids	Khalil (voice)
1994	House Party 3	Marques James
1997	Good Burger	Jake
2001	House Party 4: Down to the Last Minute	Jon Jon
2004	You Got Served	Elgin
2004	Fat Albert	Dumb Donald (both live-action and voice)
2007	Somebody Help Me	Brendan Young
2010	Boogie Town	Micah
2010	Somebody Help Me 2	Brendan Young
2012	Battlefield America	Sean Lewis
2015	Will to Love	Jamal Hawkins
2016	A Weekend with the Family	Travis Stankershet
2021	Howard High	Michael Krish
2022	The Stepmother	Eddie
2022	The Stepmother 2	Eddie
2023	The Stepmother 3	Eddie
2023	Best Friend	Jamie
2023	No Way Out	Brian Nelson
2024	Adopted	Detective Dante Miller
2025	TKO	Aaron
2025	Run	Andre Pierce
2025	Adopted 2	Detective Dante Miller
2026	Forever This Ring	Adrian
2026	Leave	Dr. Stevens
2026	Run 2 †	Andre Pierce

=== As producer ===
Year	Film	Role	Notes
2007	Somebody Help Me	Executive producer	Direct-to-video release
2009	Boogie Town	Executive producer	
2010	Somebody Help Me 2	Executive producer	Direct-to-video release
2012	The Helpers	Writer, producer	
2012	Battlefield America	Co-writer, producer	Theatrical release
2015	Graduation Day	Producer	
2015	Will to Love	Writer, executive producer	Television film
2015	Judge Amos	Executive producer	Television film
2016	A Weekend with the Family	Writer, producer	Television film
2016	Boy Bye	Writer, producer	Netflix release
2016	Only for One Night	Writer, producer	BET television film
2017	'Til Death Do Us Part	Co-writer, producer	Theatrical release
2018	We Belong Together	Writer, producer	BET television film
2018	Running Out of Time	Writer, producer	BET television film
2019	Fall Girls	Executive producer, writer	BET television film
2019	Sacrifice	Co-Executive producer	BET television film
2019	Swag Inc.	Executive producer, writer	BET television film
2020	Howard High	Producer	UrbanfixTV
2020	Always & 4Ever	Writer, producer	Theatrical release
2022	The Stepmother	Writer, producer	Tubi release
2022	The Stepmother 2	Writer, producer	Tubi release
2023	The Assistant	Writer, producer	Tubi release
2023	Best Friend	Writer, producer	Tubi release
2023	You're Not Alone	Writer, producer	Tubi release
2023	No Way Out	Writer, producer	Tubi release
2023	Fosters Law	Writer, producer	
2023	The Stepmother 3	Writer, producer	Tubi release
2023	Picture Me Dead	Writer, producer	Tubi release
2023	Rock the Boat	Writer, producer	Tubi release
2023	Vicious Affair	Writer, producer	Tubi release
2023	Still Here	Producer	Tubi release
2023	I Have You to Death	Writer, producer	Tubi release
2023	Forever Us	Writer, producer	Tubi release
2024	The Stepdaughter	Writer, producer	Tubi release
2024	Snatched	Writer, producer	Tubi release
2024	Rock the Boat 2	Writer, producer	Tubi release
2024	Robbin	Executive producer	Tubi release
2024	The Assistant 2	Writer, producer	Tubi release
2024	Vicious Murder	Writer, producer	Tubi release
2024	The Stepdaughter 2	Writer, producer	Tubi release
2024	Adopted	Writer, producer	Tubi release
2025	Happy Anniversary	Writer, producer	Tubi release
2025	Wrong Place Wrong Time	Writer, producer	Tubi release
2025	The Killing Cove	Executive producer	Tubi release
2025	TKO	Executive producer	Tubi release
2025	Run	Writer, executive producer	Theatrical release
2025	The Follower	Writer, executive producer, producer	Tubi release
2025	Adopted 2	Writer, producer	Tubi release
2026	Twin	Writer, executive producer, producer	Tubi release
2026	Unrequited	Writer, executive producer, producer	Tubi release
2026	Rockabye	Writer, executive producer	Tubi release
2026	Hijacked	Writer, executive producer	Tubi release
2026	I Didn't Do It	Writer, executive producer	Tubi release
2026	Night Shift	Writer, executive producer	Tubi release
2026	Stepfather	Writer, executive producer, producer	Tubi release
2026	I Know Where You Live	Writer, executive producer, producer	Tubi release
2026	Forever This Ring	Writer, executive producer	Theatrical & Turnstr+ release
2026	Leave	Writer, executive producer	Theatrical & Turnstr+ release
2026	Run 2 †	Writer, executive producer	To be released

== Awards and nominations ==
Year	Award	Category	Film/TV show	Result
1995	Young Artist Awards	Best Youth Comedian in a TV Show	Sister, Sister	Won
2004	MTV Movie Awards	Best Dance Sequence (shared with Omarion Grandberry)	You Got Served	Nominated
2005	Teen Choice Awards	Choice TV Actor – Comedy	Cuts	Nominated
