= Somebody Help Me 2 =

- Genre: Horror
- Written by: Chris Stokes
- Directed by: Chris Stokes
- Starring: Marques Houston; Omarion; Sonny King
- Music by: Michael J. Leslie
- Country of origin: United States
- Original language: English

Production
- Executive producers: Ketrina 'Taz' Askew; Marques Houston; Chris Stokes
- Producers: Sharif Ahmed; Matt Hillyer; Jerome Jones; J. Christopher Owen; Juanita Stokes; Zeus Zamani
- Cinematography: Miko Dannels
- Editor: Brett Hedlun

Original release
- Network: BET
- Release: October 29, 2010

Somebody Help Me 2 is a 2010 American horror television film starring R&B singers Marques Houston and Omarion, and is written and directed by their music producer, Chris Stokes. It is the sequel to the 2007 film Somebody Help Me, and aired on BET on October 29, 2010.

== Plot ==
Brendan and Darryl have both moved on with their lives and have found new relationships following the events at the cabin in the woods; not unscathed however. Coming up on the anniversary, Brendan is still having nightmares that he feels will come true at any moment. His worst fears come to life when his wife Michelle (Azur-De) and niece Tee Tee (Chrissy Stokes) don't return home from work one night. Jasmine (Darryl's girlfriend) comes to Brendan's house to tell him Darryl is missing too.

== Cast ==
- Marques Houston as Brendan Young
- Omarion as Darryl Jennings
- Malika Haqq as Jasmine
- Azur-De as Michelle
- Chrissy Stokes as Tee Tee
- Sonny King as Corbin
- Chris Stokes as OG
- Irene Stokes as Nurse
- Milo Stokes as John
- Heather Raelynn Bryson as Samantha
- Sebastian "Sebass" Wolski as Bria

== Release ==
The film was released on DVD and Blu-ray on August 16, 2011.
