= Circle (Marques Houston song) =

Single by Marques Houston

from the album Veteran
- Released: January 24, 2007
- Length: 4:05
- Label: TUG; Universal
- Songwriter(s): Bryan-Michael Cox; Kendrick "WyldCard" Dean; Marques Houston; Adonis Shropshire; Tanya White
- Producer(s): Bryan-Michael Cox

Marques Houston singles chronology
"Favorite Girl" (2007)	"Circle" (2007)	"Wonderful" (2007)

"Circle" is a song by American singer Marques Houston. It was written by Houston along with Adonis Shropshire, Bryan-Michael Cox, Kendrick "WyldCard" Dean, and Tanya White for his third studio album Veteran (2007). Released as the album's third single, it reached number 78 on the US Billboard Hot 100.

== Charts ==
Chart performance for "Circle"
Chart (2007)	Peak position
US Billboard Hot 100	78
US Hot R&B/Hip-Hop Songs (Billboard)	37
