= Battlefield America =

- Directed by: Chris Stokes
- Written by: Chris Stokes
- Produced by: Sharif Ahmed; Marques Houston; Jerome Jones; J. Christopher Owen; Chris Stokes; Zeus Zamani
- Starring: Gary Sturgis; Tristen M. Carter; Marques Houston; Kida Burns; Zach Balandres; Camren Bicondova; Edward Mandell; Kyle Brooks
- Cinematography: Miko Dannels
- Edited by: Sherril Schlesinger; Harvey White
- Music by: Michael J. Leslie
- Production companies: Brian & Barrett Pictures
- Distributed by: Cinedigm
- Release date: June 1, 2012
- Running time: 106 minutes
- Country: United States
- Language: English
- Box office: $172,000

Battlefield America is a 2012 American dance drama film written and directed by Chris Stokes. It stars Gary Anthony Sturgis, Tristen M. Carter, Marques Houston, Kida Burns, Zach Balandres, Camren Bicondova, Edward Mandell, and Kyle Brooks. It was released on June 1, 2012 in theaters in the United States by Cinedigm.

== Synopsis ==
A young successful man, Sean Lewis finds himself with the task of turning a group of misfit kids into a team so they can compete in the underground dance competition circuit. With no dance ability, he hires a dance instructor to help him out, while also trying to juggle this responsibility with his work. He then finds himself falling for Sara, who runs the community center for the kids.

== Cast ==
- Marques Houston as Sean Lewis
- Mekia Cox as Sara Miller
- Gary Anthony Sturgis as Eric Smith Sr.
- Tristen M. Carter as Eric Smith
- Kida Burns as Tommy
- Russell Ferguson as Prime
- Christopher Jones as Hank "Shockwave" Adams
- Zach Belandres as Chu Ling
- Camren Bicondova as Prissy
- Edward Mandell as Marv
- Kyle Brooks as Roger
- David Michie as Glen Downing

== Release ==
The film is set for a June 1, 2012 release in the United States, by Cinedigm. The film's first official trailer was posted on YouTube on February 7, 2012. A full theatrical trailer was posted on March 27, 2012.

== Reception ==
The film has a rating of 8% on Rotten Tomatoes, based on 12 reviews and an average score of 2.8/10.

== Soundtracks ==
Three mixtapes were released.

- Original Music From the Motion Picture: BATTLEFIELD AMERICA Soundtrack Mixtape Volume 1 Jahil Beats presents Mila J: JAPOLLONIA
- Original Music From the Motion Picture: BATTLEFIELD AMERICA Soundtrack Mixtape Volume 2 Jahil Beats presents MH Marques Houston
- Original Music From the Motion Picture: BATTLEFIELD AMERICA Soundtrack Mixtape Volume 3 Jahil Beats presents Tracy Irve
