= Because of You (Marques Houston song) =

Single by Marques Houston

from the album MH
- Released: January 28, 2004
- Recorded: 2003
- Genre: R&B
- Length: 4:08
- Label: TUG
- Songwriters: Steve Russell; Troy Taylor

Marques Houston singles chronology
"Pop That Booty" (2003)	"Because of You" (2004)	"All Because of You" (2005)

"Because of You" is the fourth and final United States and third and final United Kingdom single from Marques Houston's debut album, MH.

== Performance ==
The single did not fare nearly as well as Houston's previous singles in the UK, where it missed the top forty but managed to peak inside the top seventy-five at number fifty-one. In the US, "Because of You" did only as well as "Pop That Booty" on the Billboard Hot 100, just getting to 76. It did better on Hot R&B/Hip-Hop Songs, peaking at 23 there.

"Because of You" was also the first single from Marques Houston to feature a B-side; the song "Dirty Dancin'" had not been previously released and was only featured on the vinyl version of the UK single.

As of June 2010 this was the third and final single to be released by Houston in the UK as no singles from his Naked, Veteran, or later albums have been released there.

== Track listings ==
=== UK - CD ===
1. "Because of You" (radio edit)
2. "Because of You" (album version)

=== UK - Vinyl ===
1. "Because of You" (album version)
2. "Dirty Dancin'" (non album track)
3. "Because of You" (instrumental)
