= Stephen Bishop (actor) =

American actor

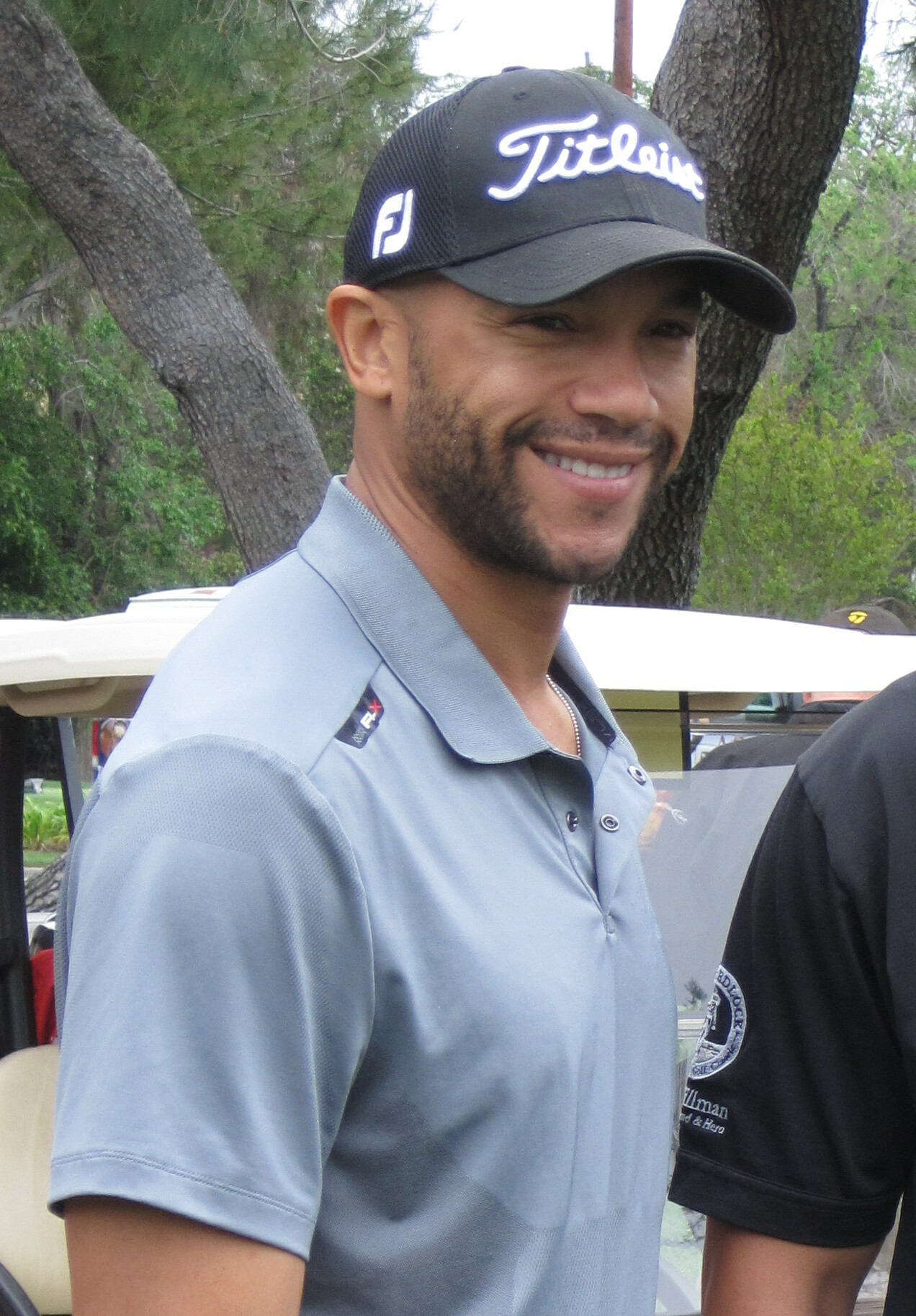
- Bishop at the 8th Annual Hack n' Smack Celebrity Golf Tournament in 2011
- Born: September 14, 1970 (age 55); Chicago, Illinois, U.S
- Occupation: Actor
- Children: 1

Stephen C. Bishop (born September 14, 1970) is an American actor and former baseball player. He was a regular cast member in the television series Being Mary Jane (2013–15), Imposters (2017–18) and Run the World (2021–23). Bishop also appeared in films Friday Night Lights (2004), Moneyball (2011), 'Til Death Do Us Part (2017) and Fatal Affair (2020).

== Baseball career ==
Bishop attended the University of California, Riverside, where he played baseball for the Highlanders from 1991–1992. After college he signed a free agent contract with the Atlanta Braves and played in 20 games for the Idaho Falls Braves, Atlanta's affiliate in the Pioneer League in 1993. In 1994, he played for the Sioux Falls Canaries and the St. Paul Saints of the independent Northern League, and in 1995 he played for the High Desert Mavericks, the High-A affiliate for the Baltimore Orioles.

== Acting career ==
Bishop's acting career began with supporting roles in The Rundown (2003), Friday Night Lights (2004) and Americanese (2006). He starred in the 2006 horror film Sam's Lake opposite Fay Masterson. On television, Bishop appeared in two episodes of UPN comedy series Girlfriends in 2004, and the following years guest-starred on Friday Night Lights, Brothers & Sisters, The Game, Lost, Grey's Anatomy and The Mentalist. In 2011 he played David Justice in the biographical sports drama film Moneyball starring Brad Pitt.

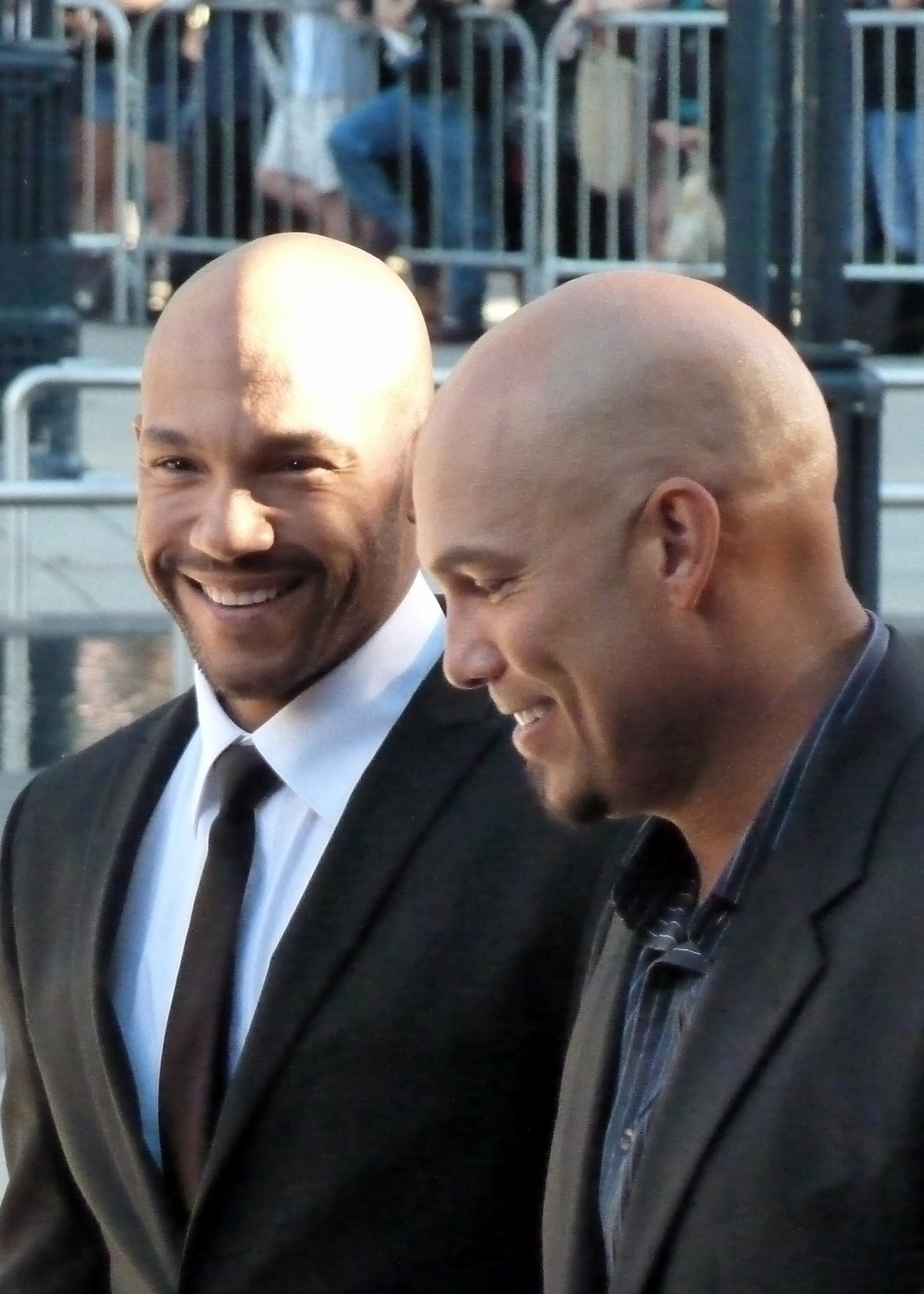
Bishop at the Moneyball premiere in 2011 with David Justice.

In 2013, Bishop was cast opposite Gabrielle Union in the BET drama series, Being Mary Jane as Mary Jane's love interest. In 2014, he appeared in the comedy-thriller Miss Meadows and in 2015 in the romantic comedy With This Ring opposite Regina Hall. In 2017 he starred in the TV One pilot movie Media alongside Penny Johnson Jerald. Later that year he starred in the psychological thriller film 'Til Death Do Us Part alongside Annie Ilonzeh and Taye Diggs.

From 2017 to 2018, Bishop starred in the Bravo comedy series, Imposters. In 2018, it was announced that Bishop had been cast in a recurring role on Criminal Minds as Supervisory Special agent Andrew Mendoza, who will be a love interest for Emily Prentiss. He also guest-starred on Greenleaf, SEAL Team and Agents of S.H.I.E.L.D.. In 2020, Bishop starred in the Netflix psychological thriller film, Fatal Affair. From 2021 to 2023, Bishop starred in the Starz comedy series, Run the World. In 2022, he had a recurring role in the Apple series The Terminal List and later was cast in The Equalizer.

== Personal life ==
He and his former partner, model Jesiree Dizon, have a child.

== Filmography ==
=== Film ===
Film roles
Year	Title	Role	Notes
2003	The Road Home	Tyrell Hunt	Also known as Pitcher and the Pin-Up
2003	The Rundown	Knappmiller	
2004	Friday Night Lights	Loie Harris	
2006	Americanese	Miles	
2006	Sam's Lake	Franklin	
2008	Hancock	ER Doctor	Uncredited
2010	The Town	Derrick	Uncredited
2010	The Company We Keep	Dwight	
2011	Moneyball	David Justice	
2012	Safe House	Marine Guard	
2012	Battleship	JPJ OOD	
2013	Thank You Card	Detective Browning	Short film
2014	Miss Meadows	Lt. Danny	
2016	Grandma's House	Edgar	
2017	Jeep Compass: Baseball Coach	Himself	Short film
2017	'Til Death Do Us Part	Michael Roland	
2019	The Trap	K.P.	
2019	Keys to the City	Mayor Kenneth Briggs	Also executive producer
2020	Fatal Affair	Marcus Warren	
2022	Singleholic	Michael Webb	
2023	Imani	Sen Grant Powell	
2024	One Night Stay	Marcus	Also executive producer
2024	Finding Tony	Tony Greene	Also producer

=== Television ===
Television roles
Year	Title	Role	Notes
2004	Girlfriends	Alex Mendoza	2 episodes
2006	Friday Night Lights	Interviewer	Episodes: "Eyes Wide Open"
2006	Brothers & Sisters	Rick	Episode: "Mistakes Were Made: Part 2"
2007	The Game	Eva's Fiance	Episode: "Out of Bounds"
2007	Lost	Kincaid	Episode: "The Man from Tallahassee"
2008	Grey's Anatomy	Firefighter	2 episodes
2009	CSI: Miami	Hazmat Team Leader	Episode: "Bolt Action"
2011	The Mentalist	Trey Holcombe	Episode: "Pink Tops"
2011	Prime Suspect	Agent Biddle	Episode: "The Great Wall of Silence"
2012	Hart of Dixie	Zach Jeffries	Episode: "Suspicious Minds"
2013	Royal Pains	Tripp Doby	Episode: "Lawson Translation"
2013	Mob City	Smooth Watson	Episode: "His Banana Majesty"
2013–2015	Being Mary Jane	David Paulk	Recurring (Season 1); Main cast (Season 2-3)
2015	With This Ring	Nate	TV movie
2017	Media	Will Randolph	TV movie
2017–2018	Imposters	Patrick Campbell / Agent Simons	Main cast
2018	Greenleaf	Michael	Episode: "The Promised Land"
2018	Coins for Christmas	Alec	TV movie
2018–2020	Criminal Minds	SSA Andrew Mendoza	4 episodes
2019	SEAL Team	Master Chief Winston Blake	Episode: "The Ones You Can't See"
2020	Agents of S.H.I.E.L.D.	Major Brandon Gamble	2 episodes
2021–2023	Run the World	Matthew Powell	
2022	The Equalizer	Dr. Miles Fulton	Episode: "Hard Money"
2022	The Terminal List	Richard Fontana	
