= Somebody Help Me (film) =

2007 horror television film by Chris Stokes

- Film poster
- Genre: Horror
- Written by: Chris Stokes
- Directed by: Chris Stokes
- Starring: Marques Houston; Omarion; Alexis Fields; Amanda Lee
- Composers: Tony Scott; Ceiri Torjussen
- Country of origin: United States
- Original language: English

Production
- Executive producer: Ketrina Askew
- Producers: Juanita Charles; Annette A. Howard; Sherri James; Jerome Jones; Chris Stokes; Juanita Stokes
- Cinematography: Chris Tufty
- Editor: Peter Devaney Flanagan
- Running time: 100 minutes
- Production companies: Basement Films; Christopher Brian Films; Franchise Boys Films; The Ultimate Group Films

Original release
- Network: BET
- Release: October 31, 2007

Related
- Somebody Help Me 2

Somebody Help Me is a 2007 American horror television film starring Marques Houston and Omarion, written and directed by their music producer, Chris Stokes.

The film premiered on BET on October 31, 2007, and was released on DVD in United States on November 13, 2007.

== Plot ==
Somebody Help Me is the story of Brendan Young (Marques Houston) and Darryl Jennings (Omarion Grandberry) as they head off with their girlfriends, respectively Serena (Brooklyn Sudano) and Kimmy (Alexis Fields), and friends for a weekend's stay at a remote cabin in the woods. After the couples settle in, things take an eerie turn. One by one, the group ends up missing or dead, while the remaining few are forced to band together to figure out who or what is behind these killings.

The murderer kills his victims by slicing off parts of their bodies. The killings in order include: Barbara (Jessica Friedman) having part of her head sliced, Andrea (Amanda Fetters) having her entire scalp ripped off, Mike (Garristone Koch), Barbara's boyfriend having his eyes and fingernails ripped out, the sheriff having his throat slit, and Ken (Luke Fryden), Andrea's boyfriend having his teeth ripped out then being smothered to death. Nicole (Jessica Szohr) dies from an asthma attack when the man does not give her an inhaler.

The killer's granddaughter, Daisy (Brittany Oaks), sings "Ring around the Rosie" throughout the movie, and helps Brendan free the others in the end. Three of the teenagers end up dead, and Olsen comes in time to save Brendan and free Serena, Darryl, Kimmy, and Nicole's boyfriend, Seth (Christopher Jones).

The last scene is the murderer and Daisy having their car searched and the policeman letting him go as Daisy sings "Ring Around The Rosie" again.

== Cast ==
- Marques Houston as Brendan
- Omarion as Darryl Jennings
- Brooklyn Sudano as Serena
- Alexis Fields as Kimmy
- Sonny King as Corbin
- Brittany Oaks as Daisy
- Stephen Snedden as Deputy Adams
- Christopher Jones as Seth
- Jessica Szohr as Nicole
- Luke Frydenger as Ken Thomas
- Jessica Friedman as Barbara Hilton
- Amanda Lee as Andrea
- Garristone Koch as Mike
- Donna DuPlantier as Nurse
- Irene Stokes as Store Clerk
- Todd Thomas as Officer, Road Block
- Jim Wilkey as Sheriff Bob
- John Wiltshire as Olsen
- Devonne Burch as Sean

== Sequel ==
A sequel, Somebody Help Me 2, premiered on BET on October 29, 2010.
