= Mr. Houston =

Studio album by Marques Houston
- Released: September 29, 2009
- Recorded: 2007–2009
- Genre: R&B
- Length: 45:58
- Labels: MusicWorks; Fontana
- Producers: Marques Houston; Detail

Marques Houston chronology
Veteran (2007)	Mr. Houston (2009)	Mattress Music (2010)

Singles from Mr. Houston
- 1. "I Love Her" Released: June 30, 2009; 2. "Body" Released: August 21, 2009; 3. "Case of You" Released: October 8, 2009

Mr. Houston is the fourth studio album by American R&B singer Marques Houston. It was released by MusicWorks Entertainment on September 29, 2009, in the United States, with distribution handled by Fontana, marking Houston's debut released with the label following his departure from the Universal brand in 2008. A breakaway from previous albums, the singer worked with a smaller number of collaborators on Mr. Houston, which features chief production by Noel "Detail" Fisher and Houston himself.

== Critical reception ==
Professional ratings
Review scores
Source	Rating
About.com	3/5 stars
AllMusic	2/5 stars

AllMusic reviewer Andy Kellman found that "the disc is not the most distinctive set of the former Immature member's career, highlighted by the breezy "Express Lane" (which could have only been written in the wake of Jamie Foxx's "Blame It") and "Stranger," where Houston is at his unassuming best."

== Track listing ==
No.	Title	Writer(s)	Producer(s)	Length
1.	"I Love Her" (featuring Jim Jones)	Marques Houston; Charles Hinshaw; Chris Stokes; Ivondia Cannon; Jones; Joaquin Bynum	Bynum	3:33
2.	"Body"	Houston; Stokes; Noel Fisher	Detail	4:45
3.	"How I Do"	Houston; Stokes; Marcus Boyd; Kat Danson; Fisher	Detail; Drummaz^{[a]}	3:26
4.	"Express Lane"	Houston; Stokes; Fisher	Detail; Drummaz^{[a]}	3:24
5.	"Case of You"	Houston; Alex Cantrall; Stokes; Dwight Watson; Erica Watson	Cantrall; Jeff Hoeppner^{[a]}	4:11
6.	"Stranger"	Houston; Stokes; Fisher	Detail	4:12
7.	"Say My Name"	Houston; Charlie Keith Stewart; Stokes; Christopher D. Jenkins; Derrek Clarke	Jenkins; Doc Clarke; Les Butler	3:32
8.	"Letter"	Houston; Stokes	Houston	3:43
9.	"Sexy Young Girl"	Houston; Stokes	Houston	3:47
10.	"Date"	Houston; Stokes; Omari Grandberry	Naruto's Melody's	4:03
11.	"Beautiful Woman"	Houston; Stokes	Houston	3:54

iTunes bonus tracks
No.	Title	Writer(s)	Producer(s)	Length
12.	"Sunset"	Houston; Stokes; Fisher	Detail	3:58
13.	"Restaurant"	Houston; Stokes; Kenya Lucas; Fisher	Detail	3:28
14.	"Excited"	Houston; Stokes; Fisher	Detail	3:23

Notes

- ^{^a} signifies a co-producer

== Charts ==
Chart (2009)	Peak position
Japanese Albums (Oricon)	90
US Billboard 200	62
US Independent Albums (Billboard)	9
US Top R&B/Hip-Hop Albums (Billboard)	12
