= Pop That Booty =

2003 single by Marques Houston

Single by Marques Houston featuring Jermaine Dupri

from the album MH
- Released: September 24, 2003
- Recorded: 2002
- Genre: Crunk
- Length: 4:06
- Label: TUG
- Songwriters: Marques Houston; Jermaine Mauldin; Tony Oliver; Tim Stewart
- Producers: Marques Houston; Tony Scott

Marques Houston singles chronology
"Clubbin'" (2003)	"Pop That Booty" (2003)	"Because of You" (2004)

Jermaine Dupri singles chronology
"Basketball" (2002)	"Pop That Booty" (2003)	"Wat Da Hook Gon Be" (2003)

"Pop That Booty" is the third US and second UK single from Marques Houston's debut album, MH. The video and single features a guest appearance from Jermaine Dupri. It is the third track on the album.

A music video was produced featuring B2K member Lil' Fizz and Jermaine Dupri.

== Track listing ==
UK CD

1. "Pop That Booty" (featuring Jermaine Dupri; radio edit)
2. "Pop That Booty" (instrumental)

UK vinyl

1. "Pop That Booty" (featuring Jermaine Dupri; radio edit)
2. "Pop That Booty" (featuring Jermaine Dupri; a cappella)
3. "Pop That Booty" (instrumental)

== Charts ==
Chart performance for "Pop That Booty"
Chart (2003–2004)	Peak position
UK Singles (OCC)	23
US Billboard Hot 100	76
US Hot R&B/Hip-Hop Songs (Billboard)	34
