= 'Til Death Do Us Part (film) =

- Theatrical release poster
- Directed by: Christopher B. Stokes
- Screenplay by: Marques Houston
- Story by: Christopher B. Stokes
- Produced by: Marques Houston; Jerome Jones; Jarell Houston; Shondrella Avery; Taye Diggs; Patrick Johnson, Jr.; Patrick Johnson, Sr.; Robert A. Johnson
- Starring: Taye Diggs; Annie Ilonzeh; Stephen Bishop; Robinne Lee; Malik Yoba; Draya Michele; Amy Hunter
- Cinematography: Joel Layogan
- Edited by: Harvey White
- Music by: Immanuel Rich
- Production companies: Footage Films; 51 Millimeters
- Distributed by: Novus Content; Amor Media
- Release date: September 29, 2017
- Running time: 101 minutes
- Country: United States
- Language: English
- Box office: $3.5 million

'Til Death Do Us Part is a 2017 American psychological thriller film written and directed by Chris Stokes and Marques Houston. The film stars Annie Ilonzeh, Stephen Bishop and Taye Diggs, who is also one of the film's producers. It follows a pregnant woman faking her death in order to escape from her abusive husband. The film was released on September 29, 2017.

== Plot ==
Michael and Madison Roland have a seemingly perfect marriage, and are celebrating their first wedding anniversary. Madison brings up that she wants to start a family together but Michael becomes irritated as he doesn't. Michael visits his mother's grave and talks to her headstone, it is revealed his mother and his father died the same year, and later it becomes known that they died in a murder-suicide.

Michael is happy when Madison quits her job to become a full time wife. Madison finds a vial of steroidal testosterone which Michael has been taking in order not to get her pregnant. She confronts him, they argue, and he slaps her, knocking her to the ground. On a separate night, Michael accuses her of knowing that his colleague likes her, she denies it and he ends up raping Madison after he becomes irrationally angry at her during an office party.

Later, Madison excitedly shows her friend, Chelsea, a positive pregnancy test. Four months later, Madison secretly gets a job working with Chelsea, and confides in her that Michael has questioned the paternity of the baby, and has been abusive. Horrified, Chelsea tries to get Madison to go to the police, but Madison refuses and tries to rationalize the situation. One night, Michael and Madison are driving home from dinner, and he is upset that she isn't talking, and he pulls over. She gets out of the car, telling Michael she is calling an Uber, and he forces her back into the car saying that he won't live without her.

The abuse continues, and Madison is unable to hide the bruises at work. Chelsea reports what is going on to the police, and starts researching options for Madison. Madison, now six months pregnant, packs a bag to go stay at Chelsea's and manages to get away from Michael when she attacks him by smashing a vase over his head, but wrecks the vehicle shortly after driving away. A fake doctor tells Michael she died during surgery, and that the baby couldn't be saved either.

Madison is still alive and in a flashback, it is shown how Chelsea helped her stage the accident and death to get away from Michael. The doctor at the hospital was a hired actor, and Madison took out a life insurance policy, making Chelsea the beneficiary to fund her new life. Madison relocates, gets a waitress job, and uses a fake name, Kate Smith. Madison meets her next door neighbor Alex Stone, a widower, and his six-year-old daughter, Rachel Stone, and he invites her over for pie, and they hit it off. Madison and Alex get closer, as he helps her prepare for the birth of her son. Alex begins to suspect that all is not what it seems, and she tells him the truth about her life.

Michael is tipped off about Madison still being alive when he gets a call from Madison's job about her not picking up her final paycheck. Through the call, Michael also discovers there is no record of her death. Michael has Rob start looking into it, and goes to see Chelsea, realizing she was involved. Madison has her baby, and names him "Peace". Elsewhere, Chelsea is leaving the hospital, and Michael appears and forces her to drive to Madison's house at gun point.

Alex takes Madison and Peace home from the hospital. Michael sneaks in the house as Madison takes a shower. He shows signs that he's there and when Madison runs up the stairs after turning off their song, to her dismay and horror, Michael holds baby Peace while Madison begs him to put the baby down. Soon after, Alex comes by, and Michael threatens to kill him if Madison acts strange to tip him off. She holds it together, but Alex figures out that something is wrong, and bursts through the door and has a fist fight with Michael. Michael strangles Alex, but Madison convinces Michael not to kill him, by faking Michael out about reconciling with him, and stabs him in his side with a knife. She calls for help, and manages to get the handgun Michael had, and kills him in self defense.

== Cast ==
- Taye Diggs as Alex Stone, Madison's new lover
- Annie Ilonzeh as Madison "Kate" Roland, the abused wife seeking to rebuild her life
- Stephen Bishop as Michael Roland, the abusive husband
- Malik Yoba as Rob
- Robinne Lee as Chelsea, Madison's best friend
- Draya Michele as Amanda
- Amy Hunter as Brenda

== Release ==
In North America, 'Til Death Do Us Part was released on September 29, 2017 alongside Flatliners and American Made, as well as the wide expansion of Battle of the Sexes, and was projected to gross around $4 million on 562 theaters in its opening weekend. It ended up underperforming, opening to just $1.5 million and finishing 9th at the box office.

The film made its television premiere on BET on February 10, 2018; the film attracted approximately 786,000 viewers. The film was eventually available for Blu-ray and DVD purchase on December 4, 2018, by Gravitas Ventures.
