= Famous (Marques Houston album) =

Studio album by Marques Houston
- Released: August 27, 2013
- Recorded: 2011–13
- Genre: Soul
- Length: 43:48
- Label: Shanachie Ent. Corp. E1 Music

Marques Houston chronology
Mattress Music (2010)	Famous (2013)	Me (2022)

Singles from Famous
- 1. "Speechless" Released: February 11, 2013; 2. "Give Your Love a Try" Released: June 18, 2013

Famous is the sixth studio album by American R&B singer Marques Houston. The album was released on August 27, 2013.

== Singles ==
On February 7, 2013, the music video for "Speechless" was released. On February 11, 2013, the album's first single "Speechless" was released. On June 18, 2013, the album's second single "Give Your Love a Try" was released. On July 29, 2013, the music video was released for "Give Your Love a Try" featuring Problem.

== Critical response ==
Professional ratings
Review scores
Source	Rating
AllMusic	2.5/5 stars

Famous was met with a generally mixed reviews from music critics. Andy Kellman of AllMusic gave the album two and a half stars out of five, saying "Famous, Marques Houston's sixth solo album and first for Shanachie, is a little more D'Angelo and a little less R. Kelly than previous release Mattress Music. Almost all of the tracks involve newcomer producer and songwriter Immanuel Jordan Rich, who grants Houston a set dominated by mature slow jams. A few of the ballads are sleepy and nondescript. "Only You" gets the album off to a poor start; the lyrical quotes from Marvin Gaye's "Let's Get It On" are so extensive that Houston seems as if he can't be bothered to add his own touch. The remainder, thankfully, is a little more creative and memorable. The easy-gliding falsetto showcase "Take Your Love Away," which ranks with Houston's best work, is the album's standout."

== Track listing ==
No.	Title	Length
1.	"Only You"	3:37
2.	"Nothin' On You"	2:53
3.	"Give Your Love a Try"	3:02
4.	"Famous"	3:39
5.	"The Way Love Is"	3:27
6.	"Take Your Love Away"	3:59
7.	"Leaving My Girl"	3:32
8.	"Make It Last Forever"	3:47
9.	"See You"	4:25
10.	"Speechless"	3:25
11.	"Lifetime"	4:04
12.	"Fly Away"	3:56
13.	"Sexy Baby"	5:00

== Charts ==
Chart (2013)	Peak position
US Billboard 200	180
US Independent Albums (Billboard)	36
US Top R&B/Hip-Hop Albums (Billboard)	33
