= Antoine Von Boozier =

American singer

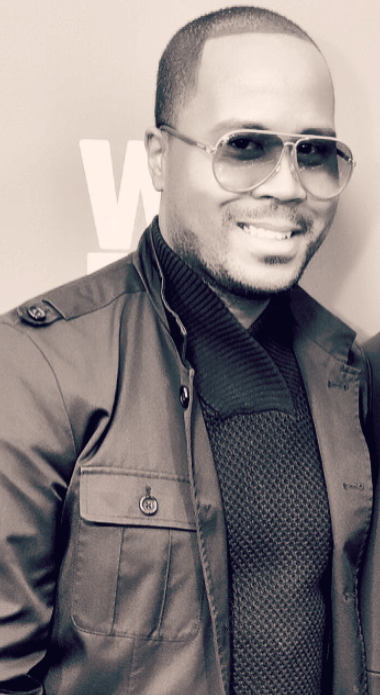
- Antoine Von Boozier 2016
- Born: November 10, 1985 (age 40); Brooklyn, New York, U.S.
- Occupations: Actor, columnist, tv personality, former publicist
- Website: www.thevonbooziertwins.com

Antoine Quarles (born November 10, 1985), better known by his stage name Antoine Von Boozier, is an American actor, columnist, television personality, singer, and former publicist. He is best known for appearances on Kings, Limitless, Katie Couric Show, The Real Housewives of New York City, Broad City, and Mob Wives.

== Life and career ==
Von Boozier was born, raised, and resides in Brooklyn, New York. He attended and graduated from Edward R. Murrow High School majoring in music and journalism. He has an identical twin brother named Andre.

Prior to television, Von Boozier was a background singer on the long running TV program the Jerry Lewis MDA Labor Day Telethon. He has contributed BG vocals for numerous artists including: Hezekiah Walker, Lil' Mo, En Vogue, and Cissy Houston. Von Boozier is the co-producer of "Inspired In New York Honors", a monthly series created to honor icons in film, sports, music, fashion, arts, and philanthropy. He is the co-creator of a luxury candle collection named "Von Boozier – Signature Lux Candle Collection". In October 2015, Von Boozier joined the contributing editor staff at Floss Magazine with a column called "Von Boozier Lifestyle".

=== Filmography ===
Television

- 2007, 2008, 2009 Jerry Lewis MDA Labor Day Telethon as himself (Background Singer)
- 2007 Without a Trace as Carson
- 2007 Judge David Young as Himself
- 2008 CSI: NY as BG
- 2008 Lipstick Jungle as BG
- 2009 Kings as Shiloh Police Officer
- 2009 Castle as Series Regular
- 2009 Cupid as Series Regular
- 2009 The Good Wife as Mug Shot Criminal
- 2009 Law & Order SVU as Series Regular
- 2010 Ugly Betty as Series Regular
- 2010 You Don't Know Jack as Guest Star
- 2011 The Real Housewives of New Jersey as himself
- 2012 Ice Loves Coco as herself
- 2013 Katie as himself (Panelist)
- 2013 Mob Wives as Himself
- 2013 King On 34th as Himself (Fashion Judge)
- 2014 Bethenny as Himself
- 2014 Broad City as Himself
- 2014, 2015, 2016 The Real Housewives of New York City as Himself
- 2016 Limitless as Himself (Twin)

Film

- 2010 Salt as Navy P.O Officer
- 2009 Everybody's Fine as Train Operator
- 2009 The Rebound as Boxing Match Judge
- 2009 Made for Each Other
