= Clubbin' =

Single by Marques Houston featuring Joe Budden & Pied Piper

from the album MH
- Released: June 25, 2003
- Recorded: 2002
- Genre: R&B
- Length: 4:04
- Label: TUG
- Songwriters: R. Kelly, Joe Budden
- Producer: R. Kelly

Marques Houston singles chronology
"That Girl" (2003)	"Clubbin'" (2003)	"Pop That Booty" (2003)

Joe Budden singles chronology
"Pump It Up" (2003)	"Clubbin'" (2003)	"Fire (Yes, Yes Y'all)" (2003)

R. Kelly singles chronology
"Soldier's Heart" (2003)	"Clubbin'" (2003)	"Thoia Thoing" (2003)

"Clubbin'" is the second single by Marques Houston from his debut album MH in the US and his debut single in the UK. The song features Joe Budden and is the second track on the album. The "Clubbin'" remix was also featured and once again Joe Budden performed on the track, alongside R. Kelly, credited as Pied Piper. Kelly also wrote and produced the song.

The single was Houston's biggest hit to date in both the UK and the U.S., peaking inside the UK top twenty at number fifteen and peaking inside the Billboard Hot 100 at number thirty-nine.

== Track listing ==
UK - CD

1. "Clubbin'" (featuring Joe Budden & Pied Piper) (album version)
2. "Clubbin'" (featuring Joe Budden) (remix)

UK - Vinyl

1. "Clubbin'" (featuring Joe Budden & Pied Piper) (album version)
2. "Clubbin'" (instrumental)
3. "Clubbin'" (featuring Joe Budden) (remix)
4. "Clubbin'" (remix instrumental)

== Charts ==
=== Weekly charts ===
Chart (2003–2004)	Peak position
Scotland Singles (OCC)	49
UK Hip Hop/R&B (OCC)	4
UK Singles (OCC)	15
US Billboard Hot 100	39
US Hot R&B/Hip-Hop Songs (Billboard)	12
US Rhythmic Airplay (Billboard)	40

=== Year-end charts ===
Chart (2003)	Position
US Hot R&B/Hip-Hop Songs (Billboard)	64
