= Chris Stokes (filmmaker) =

American record executive and filmmaker

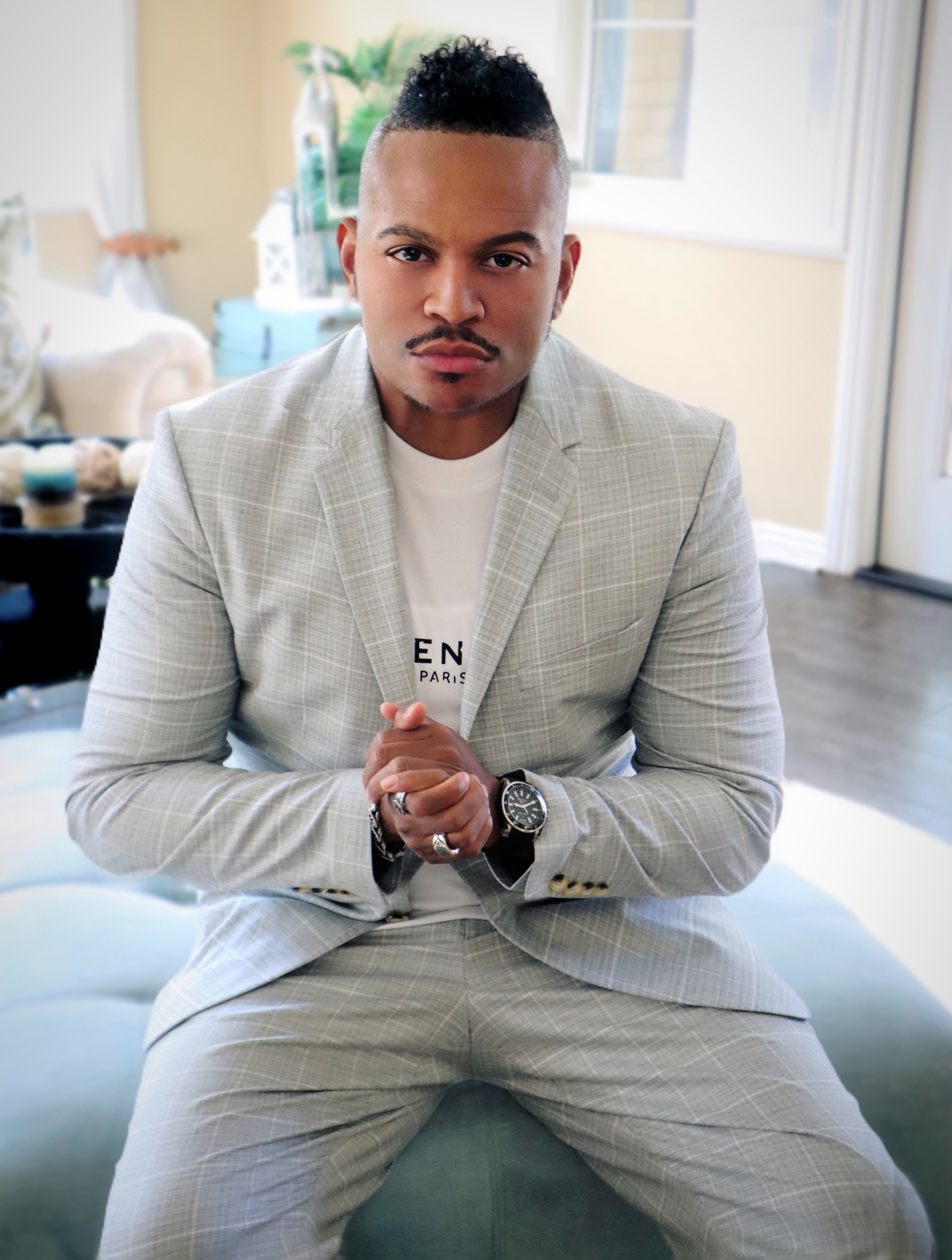
- Stokes in 2020
- Born: 1969 or 1970 (age 56–57)
- Occupations: Record executive; talent manager; film producer; director; screenwriter
- Years active: 1995–present
- Labels: TUG; Universal
- Website: www.chrisstokesent.com

Christopher B. Stokes (born 1969 or 1970) is an American filmmaker and former record executive. He founded the record label the Ultimate Group (or TUG Entertainment) in 1997, whose roster included B2K, Omarion, Jhené Aiko, Marques Houston, IMx and NLT, among others. He has also directed the 2004 dance drama film You Got Served, as well as the direct-to-TV films House Party 4 (2001) and Somebody Help Me (2007).

== Career ==
Stokes first became connected with film and television through the talent of whom he managed. In 1992, Marques Houston made his acting debut in the animated comedy film Bebe's Kids, and received his big break as a regular on Sister, Sister in 1994. All three members of Immature appeared in the film House Party 3 (1994).

Stokes' first film credit came in 2001 as the writer and director of House Party 4, which starred Immature, which by then had transitioned to their new name IMx. He then served as the writer and director of the 2004 dance film You Got Served, which was commercially successful and starred members of his TUG label; The cast included Houston, as well as rapper Lil' Kim.

In 2007 Stokes launched a clothing and fashion line, the Christopher Brian Collection, which debuted at Magic in Las Vegas February 2007. The line featured Kim Kardashian as the principal spokesmodel and was available at Dash, her Calabasas boutique. Promotional images for the brand featured topless pictures of Kim Kardashian wearing just the Christopher Brian pants.

He also wrote and directed the horror films Somebody Help Me and Somebody Help Me 2. The first of which made a television premiere on BET on Halloween 2007, and released to DVD the following November. Both were distributed by Vivendi. The company's second feature, No Vacancy, another horror, was completed in 2011 and the first of Stokes' films not star talent from his musical career. It was distributed by Grindstone / Lionsgate Home Entertainment.

Also in 2011, Stokes returned to the dance battle genre with the dance-drama Battlefield America, starring Houston, Gary Anthony Sturgis, and Lynn Whitfield. The film follows a young businessman whose community service obligations require him to turn a group of misfit kids into a dance team.

In 2018, Stokes signed a 3-picture deal with Viacom for his films We Belong Together, Running Out of Time, and Fall Girls. The former launched BET Network's original movie franchise by premiering simultaneously on BET and BET Her, produced by Chris Stokes' Footage Films production company. In August 2019, BET+ announced their legal thriller, Sacrifice to be written, directed, and produced by Stokes, and to star Paula Patton. In May 2020, Stokes' new musical series "Howard High", starring Marques Houston debuts on subscription-based platform UrbanflixTV.

In 2020, BET+ acquired Trigger, directed by Stokes. It is set to be released this summer as a BET Original on their streaming platform. That same year, the company released Always and Forever, directed by Stokes and starring Lauren London, Cynthia Addai-Robinson, Deborah Ayorinde, Rocsi Diaz, Wood Harris and Loretta Devine. In September 2020, BET+ launched Sacrifice into a television series, ordering 10 episodes to be written, directed, and produced by Stokes.

Stokes announced in 2021 that Footage Films was greenlit to produce a new series, Foster Law, for the Black streaming network UrbanFlix. In 2023, Stokes released the third installment of The Stepmother, marking the first three-movie franchise in Tubi's history. Each film follows Elizabeth Carter (Erica Mena)'s escapades to find the perfect family and stars recurring Stokes cast members, including Houston. Tubi then released four new original Black cinema thrillers by Stokes in 2023: The Assistant, Best Friend, You’re Not Alone and No Way Out.

== Sexual assault allegations ==
In December 2007, Stokes was accused of sexual assault by his cousin, B2K member DeMario "Raz-B" Thornton, alleged to have happened while Stokes was managing the group and Thornton was eleven or twelve years old. B2K group member Omarion defended Stokes, calling the allegations untrue. Stokes denied any wrongdoing, calling the accusation "ridiculous" and saying "all the allegations they made are false." The following day, Thornton retracted the allegation and apologized to Stokes, though Thornton's brother Ricardo implied the retraction was coerced and that Thornton will "come back around."

In July 2008, Vibe magazine published an article in which singer Quindon Tarver, once signed to Stokes' TUG label, alleged he had been sexually abused by Stokes for four years, beginning at age twelve. Stokes called the accusations from both Thornton and Tarver "a cry for attention" and denied the allegations.

== Filmography ==
Year	Film	Role	Notes
2001	House Party 4	Writer, Director	Cameo appearance as "Ray Ray"
2004	You Got Served	Writer, Director	
2007	Somebody Help Me	Writer, Director, Producer	
2010	Somebody Help Me 2	Writer, Director, Producer	
2012	Battlefield America	Writer, Director, Producer	
2012	The Helpers	Writer, Director, Producer	
2012	Boogie Town	Writer, Director, Producer	
2016	Only for One Night	Director	
2016	Boy Bye	Director	
2017	'Til Death Do Us Part	Writer, Director	
2018	Always & 4Ever	Writer, Director	
2018	We Belong Together	Writer, Director	BET Television Movie
2018	Running Out Of Time	Writer, Director	
2019	Fall Girls	Writer, Director	
2019	Sacrifice	Writer, Director	BET+ Original
2020	Howard High	Director	TV Mini-Series
2020	Trigger	Director	TV Mini-Series
2020	Always and Forever	Writer, Director	BET Television Movie
2022	The Stepmother	Writer, Director	Tubi Original
2022	The Stepmother 2	Writer, Director	Tubi Original
2023	The Assistant	Writer, Director	Tubi Original
2023	Best Friend	Writer, Director	Tubi Original
2023	You're Not Alone	Writer, Director	Tubi Original
2023	No Way Out	Writer, Director	Tubi Original
2023	The Stepmother 3	Writer, Director	Tubi Original
2023	Picture Me Dead	Writer, Director	Tubi Original
2023	Rock the Boat	Writer, Director	Tubi Original
2023	Vicious Affair	Writer, Director	Tubi Original
2023	Still Here	Writer, Director	Tubi Original
2023	I Hate You to Death	Writer, Director	Tubi Original
2023	Forever Us	Writer, Director	Tubi Original
2024	The Stepdaughter	Writer, Director	Tubi Original
2024	Snatched	Writer, Director	Tubi Original
2024	Rock the Boat 2	Writer, Director	Tubi Original
2024	Robbin	Writer, Director	Tubi Original
2024	The Assistant 2	Writer, Director	Tubi Original
2024	Vicious Murder	Writer, Director	Tubi Original
2024	The Stepdaughter 2	Writer, Director	Tubi Original
2024	Adopted	Writer, Director	Tubi Original
2025	Happy Anniversary	Writer, Director	Tubi Original
2025	Wrong Place, Wrong Time	Writer, Director	Tubi Original
2025	The Killing Cove	Writer, Director	Tubi Original
2025	TKO	Writer, Director	Tubi Original
2025	Run	Writer, Director	Theatrical release
2025	The Follower	Writer, Director	Tubi Original
2025	Adopted 2	Writer, Director	Tubi Original
2026
2026	Twin	Writer, Director	Tubi Original
2026	Unrequited	Writer, Director	Tubi Original
2026	Rockabye	Writer, Director	Tubi Original
2026	Hijacked	Writer, Director	Tubi Original
2026	I Didn't Do It	Writer, Director	Tubi Original
2026	Night Shift	Writer, Director	Tubi Original
2026	Stepfather	Writer, Director	Tubi Original
2026	I Know Where You Live	Writer, Director	Tubi Original
2026	Leave	Writer, Director	Theatrical release
2026	Forever This Ring †	Writer, Director	To be released
