= The Helpers =

2012 film by Chris Stokes

- Directed by: Chris Stokes
- Produced by: Chris Stokes; Zeus Zamani
- Starring: Kristen Quintrall; Denyce Lawton; Christopher Jones; JoJo Wright; Rachel Sterling; Dallas Lovato; Rebecca Burchett; Black Thomas; Dustin Harnish; Cameron Diskin; Braxton Davis
- Cinematography: Miko Dannels
- Edited by: Harvey White
- Music by: Michael J. Leslie
- Release date: September 28, 2012 (United States)
- Country: United States
- Language: English
- Budget: $4 million

The Helpers is a 2012 American horror film by Chris Stokes. The film was released on September 28, 2012. It was released in some countries as Vacancy 4 and is also known as No Vacancy, although it is unconnected to the 2007 film Vacancy.

== Plot ==
The film opens with a scene of newspapers and news broadcasts describing an orphanage which was burned down, resulting in several deaths. It then turns to seven friends as they start out on a road trip to Las Vegas, with Phil (JoJo Wright) recording the trip for his girlfriend Julia. The group hits a road block en route to their destination, prompting them to take a detour that results in several flat tires. The group decides that the women will remain behind to watch the truck while the men go to look for help. The men eventually come across a rest-stop motel that sells tires, introducing themselves to the gas attendant Brad and the shop owner Steve (Braxton Davis) and Norah (Dallas Lovato). Steve offers to not only fix the truck and pick up the girls, but to provide free alcoholic drinks, in addition to letting the group stay at the neighboring motel for the night. One of the group members, Todd (Dustin Harnish), is originally hesitant about the proposition, but eventually agrees to it. After a wild night of drinking and partying, the group falls asleep in the motel.

The group eventually wakes up the next morning/afternoon. At first everything appears normal, but it soon becomes clear that Steve and his cohorts are nowhere to be found on the premises. None of the friends remembers much about what happened the previous night. And four of the friends (Jordan, Brandy, Ryan, Anna) wake up realizing they're tied up or otherwise physically incapacitated. Jordan is tied up to a chair in the bathroom next to the bathtub, with a bucket on his arm and an electric wire tied to his hand. Brandy is tied up in the bathtub. Ryan is tied to a chair in his room, and Anna is tied up on the bed, at her hands and her feet. At first the friends believe this to be some sort of bad joke, but when Todd and Claire witness Phil being intentionally decapitated by Brad, it becomes clear that Steve, Brad, Norah and Chloe are actually cruel, sadistic sociopaths, (who call themselves "the helpers") intent on torturing and murdering the group. Claire (Kristen Quintrall) and Todd are locked in their motel room and are forced to watch while their friends get murdered one by one. The helpers go into Anna and Ryan's room and reveal that each end of Anna's body is chained to a car, and they will drive the cars and rip her body in half. They do so, while Ryan is tied up and unable to stop them. They then go into Jordan and Brandy's room and explain that the wire attached to Jordan's arm will be lowered into the water in the bathtub by placing rocks in the bucket hanging from his arm, electrocuting Brandy. Brandy is killed from being electrocuted four times, while Jordan's arm with the wire was forcibly placed in the water. The men remove Brandy from the tub and leave Jordan with Norah. Norah taunts Jordan, who then pushes Norah into the tub and electrocutes her with the wire, killing her. Todd and Claire also manage to successfully escape from their room. However, Todd and Claire are caught while attempting to flee and are brought back to the complex. The helpers bring out Ryan (still tied to the chair) and shoot him dead in front of the others, and then chain Claire to the cars as they did to Anna, threatening to rip her body in half, unless she admits that her father was the abusive owner of an orphanage. She admits that her father was indeed the owner of an orphanage.

It's eventually revealed that the three murderers used to live in an orphanage run by Claire's father where they were terribly abused and beaten, with the murderers intentionally setting the group up to come by the motel. They found the motel/gas station, killed the employees, and took it over. Then they placed road detour signs on the road, and placed sharp objects to puncture the cars tires. It is also revealed that before they left the orphanage, they burned it down, as the news described in the opening scene of the movie. Hence, the murderers main motive for their barbarism is revenge against Claire's father. They knew that the group was going on a road trip because Phil's girlfriend, Julia, was one of them. Jordan, Todd, and Claire manage to escape. The film ends with a scene "six months later" where "the helpers" are working at another gas station, asking their customers if they need any help.

== Cast ==
- Kristen Quintrall as Claire
- Denyce Lawton as Brandy
- Christopher Jones as Ryan
- JoJo Wright as Phil
- Rachel Sterling as Anna
- Black Thomas as Jordan
- Dustin Harnish as Todd
- Cameron Diskin as Brad
- Braxton Davis as Steve
- Rebecca Burchett as Chloe
- Dallas Lovato as Norah
- Ben Hardy as Matthew
- Trever Sambrano as Jake
