= Reading to Kids =

Charitable organization

Reading to Kids is a charitable organization that sponsors monthly reading clubs at inner-city elementary schools with low literacy rates in Los Angeles, California, United States. It provides books and volunteers who read to the children. After each reading club, the books are donated to the schools' libraries, and each child receives a reading-related prize for attending. Reading to Kids also provides guidance for parents for encouraging their participating children to read more at home.

== History ==
The first reading clubs were offered in May 1999 at Gratts Elementary, a primary school in Los Angeles's Westlake neighborhood. At the club, initially known as the Gratts Reading Club, eight volunteers read to twenty children. The club's popularity grew, and later that year its organizers created Reading to Kids.

According to the organization's website, current volunteer attendance as of May, 2026 averages 177 per month. Student participation at seven local schools reaches 286 children on average per month.

== Activities ==
=== Reading clubs ===
Reading to Kids hosts monthly reading clubs at seven Los Angeles area elementary schools. Pairs of volunteers read aloud to small groups of elementary school children, who range in grade level from kindergarten to fifth grade. The children are grouped according to grade level, and grade-level-appropriate books are selected each month by school faculty.

Reading to Kids' stated goal is, in part, to "help these children associate reading with pleasure and to promote the value of education and literacy." To that end, 30 to 45 minutes of each session are reserved for a craft project, during which the students and volunteers create art related to the day's book. Often the clubs are themed; these themes extend from the choice of books for the different grade levels to the craft projects undertaken by the children.

First-time volunteers typically participate in brief training sessions, during which program organizers review the clubs' rules and guidelines, and communicate other information about the roles of the volunteers and the activities planned for the day.

At the end of each session, volunteers give each child a book to take home.

=== Book donations ===
Reading to Kids also strives to develop the library resources of participating schools through book donations. The books purchased or donated for use at the reading clubs are later donated to school libraries.

Additionally, at the conclusion of each reading club the children are given free books. Reading to Kids notes that "60% percent of low-income homes do not have age-appropriate reading materials for children.".

=== Parental workshops ===
Parents are invited to attend parent training workshops that run contemporaneously with the reading clubs. Teachers provide training to parents on how to continue the benefits of the reading club by reading to their children at home.

== Sponsors and volunteer organizations ==
The organization receives support from various groups, including alumni groups, student organizations, public and private companies, and other charitable foundations.
