= The Ultimate Group =

- Parent company: Universal Music Group
- Founded: 1997
- Founder: Chris Stokes
- Status: Defunct
- Distributors: Epic Records; Interscope Records
- Genre: R&B/Pop
- Country of origin: United States
- Location: Los Angeles, California

TUG Entertainment (acronym for The Ultimate Group) was a record label and management agency founded by filmmaker record executive Chris Stokes in 1997. It operated as an imprint of Interscope, Geffen and A&M Records (subsidiaries of Universal Music Group) for many of its releases, while later releases were distributed by Epic Records (subsidiary of Sony Music Entertainment). Based in Los Angeles, the label signed commercially successful acts including B2K, Omarion, Marques Houston, Mila J, Jhené Aiko, and NLT before its closing c. 2010. Stokes also produced films through the company, namely You Got Served (2004) and Somebody Help Me (2007)—a horror film which includes in its cast Omarion and Houston.

== Notable former artists ==
- B2K
- Tom Gurl Four
- Marques Houston
- Young Rome
- Omarion
- O'Ryan
- Emmalyn Estrada
- IMx
- Monteco
- Quindon Tarver
- Jhené Aiko
- Mila J
- Juanita Stokes
- NLT

== Films ==
- House Party 4: Down to the Last Minute (2001)
- You Got Served (2004)
- Somebody Help Me (2007)
- Somebody Help Me 2 (2010)
