= R. City discography =

Rock City discography
- Studio albums: 1
- Singles: 8
- Music videos: 21
- Mixtapes: 16

The discography of Rock City (also known as R. City and Planet VI)—a songwriting and record production duo from Saint Thomas, U.S. Virgin Islands—consists of one studio album, 16 mixtapes, eight singles (including four as a featured artist) and 21 music videos. Rock City is primarily known for their songwriting and production, having written or produced songs such as "Pour It Up" by Rihanna, "Replay" by Iyaz, "Bow Down/I Been On" by Beyoncé and "We Can't Stop" by Miley Cyrus. Many albums that Rock City have contributed to have won or been nominated for Grammy Awards. For instance, the duo wrote "If This Isn't Love" on Jennifer Hudson's Grammy Award-winning self-titled album.

== Albums ==
=== Studio albums ===
Title	Album details	Peak chart positions				
Title	Album details	US	AUS	CAN	DEN	SWE
What Dreams Are Made Of	Released: 9 October 2015 (US); Label: Kemosabe, RCA; Formats: Digital download, CD	25	59	35	23	59
"—" denotes an album that did not chart or was not released in that territory.

=== Mixtapes ===
Title	Details
Put the F*ckin' Album Out	Released: 2008 (US); Label: Kon Live, Geffen; Formats: Digital download
Rock City Takeova	Released: 2008 (US); Label: Kon Live, Geffen; Formats: Digital download
The Black Beatles Mixtape	Released: 2009 (US); Label: Kon Live, Geffen; Formats: Digital download
Welcome to Rock City	Released: 2009 (US); Label: Kon Live, Geffen; Formats: Digital download
Put the F'n Album Out...Sneak Peak	Released: 2009 (US); Label: Kon Live, Geffen; Formats: Digital download
Put the F*ckin' Album Out	Released: 2009 (US); Label: Kon Live, Geffen; Formats: Digital download
PTFAO: Independence Day	Released: 2009 (US); Label: Kon Live, Geffen; Formats: Digital download
PTFAO: The Saga Continues (w/ Don Cannon)	Released: 2009 (US); Label: Kon Live, Geffen; Formats: Digital download
PTFAO: Stop Leaking Our Shit!	Released: 2009 (US); Label: Kon Live, Geffen; Formats: Digital download
The Lost Files	Released: 2009 (US); Label: Kon Live, Geffen; Formats: Digital download
PTFAO: Empire Strikes Back	Released: 2010 (US); Label: Kon Live, Geffen; Formats: Digital download
PTFAO: Independence Day Part 2	Released: 2010 (US); Label: Kon Live, Geffen; Formats: Digital download
No Off Days	Released: 2010 (US); Label: Kon Live, Geffen; Formats: Digital download
The American Dream (as Planet VI)	Released: 2011 (US); Label: Rebelution; Formats: Digital download
American Nightmare (as Planet VI)	Released: 2012 (US); Label: Rebelution; Formats: Digital download
V.I. Til We Die	Released: 2014; Label: Rebelution; Formats: Digital download

== Singles ==
=== As lead artist ===
Title	Year	Peak chart positions										Certifications	Album
Title	Year	US	AUS	AUT	CAN	DEN	NLD	NZ	SWE	SWI	UK	Certifications	Album
"Losin' It"	2008	—	—	—	—	—	—	—	—	—	—		Non-album singles
"I'm That..." (featuring 2 Chainz)	2014	—	—	—	—	—	—	—	—	—	—		Non-album singles
"Locked Away" (featuring Adam Levine)	2015	6	2	2	2	4	4	6	4	2	2	RIAA: Platinum; ARIA: 3× Platinum; BPI: Platinum; GLF: 3× Platinum; IFPI AUT: Gold; IFPI DEN: 2× Platinum; MC: 2× Platinum; RMNZ: 2× Platinum	What Dreams Are Made Of
"Make Up" (featuring Chloe Angelides)	2015	119	—	—	—	—	—	—	—	—	—		What Dreams Are Made Of
"Under Your Skin" (with Seeb)	2017	—	—	—	—	—	—	—	—	—	—		Non-album single
"—" denotes a single that did not chart or was not released in that territory.

=== As featured artist ===
Title	Year	Peak chart positions						Certifications	Album
Title	Year	US R&B/HH	DEN	NZ	SWE	SWI	UK	Certifications	Album
"Hot Like Fire" (Savage featuring Rock City)	2009	—	—	26	—	—	—		Savage Island
"Oh Africa" (Akon featuring Keri Hilson and Rock City)	2010	—	8	—	—	52	56		Non-album singles
"V.I O.G's" (Paebak featuring Planet VI)	2013	48	—	—	—	—	—		Non-album singles
"For Everybody" (Juicy J featuring Wiz Khalifa and R. City)	2015	50	—	—	—	—	—		Non-album singles
"Don't You Need Somebody" (RedOne featuring Enrique Iglesias, R. City, Serayah and Shaggy)	2016	—	—	—	7	19	—	GLF: 3× Platinum; IFPI SWI: Gold	Non-album singles
"Bang Bang" (DJ Fresh vs. Diplo featuring R. City, Selah Sue and Craig David)	2016	—	—	—	—	—	—		Non-album singles
"Jennie" (Felix Jaehn featuring R. City and Bori)	2018	—	—	—	—	86	—		I
"—" denotes a single that did not chart or was not released in that territory.

== Other charted songs ==
Title	Year	Peak chart positions	Album
Title	Year	US R&B	Album
"Pledge of Allegiance" (DJ Drama featuring Wiz Khalifa, Planet VI and B.o.B)	2013	48	Quality Street Music
"Live By the Gun" (featuring Akon)	2015	52	What Dreams Are Made Of

== Guest appearances ==
List of non-single guest appearances, with other performing artists, showing year released and album name
Title	Year	Other artist(s)	Album
"All I Know"	2006	Blak Jak	Place Your Bets
"Go Low"	2007	Beanie Sigel	The Solution
"Struggle"	2007	Jibbs	—N/a
"Lost Girl"	2007	Rich Boy, Keri Hilson	Rich Boy
"When the Lights Darken"	2008	Willie the Kid	Absolute Greatness
"Let Me See"	2008	Busta Rhymes, Machel Montano	—N/a
"Born 2 Lose"	2008	Bohagon, Mario	DJ Swatts, DJ Panic & Bohagon: 2 City Shawty
"Final Warning"	2008	DJ Khaled, Blood Raw, Ace Hood, Brisco, Bali, Lil Scrappy and Shawty Lo	We Global
"Guns High"	2008	Ace Hood	Gutta
"Hustle"	2008	E-40, Turf Talk	The Ball Street Journal
"Slow"	2008	B.o.B	Hello! My Name is B.o.B
"Ridin' High"	2008	Young Capone, Bohagon	Welcome to the Trap
"King"	2008	Booba	0.9
"Bring it Back"	2008	Kardinal Offishall	—N/a
"I Love the Islands"	2008	Savage	Savage Island
"Hot Like Fire"	2008	Savage	Savage Island
"Move Over"	2008	Hydro, Hussein Fatal	Crucial
"Last Day"	2008	DJ Speedy	Misunderstood
"Kicks 2day"	2008	Greg Street, Shortee Wop, Short Dawg	Sertified Worldwide
"Good Day Island (remix)"	2008	Greg Street, Nappy Roots, Beenie Man	Sertified Worldwide
"Put It On My Back"	2009	Hunt	—N/a
"Perfectionist"	2009	Asher Roth, Beanie Sigel	Asleep In the Bread Aisle
"No Make Up (remix)"	2009	Huey, Trey Songz	—N/a
"Overboard"	2009	Gucci Mane, OJ da Juiceman, La the Darkman	The Movie Part 2
"The Mover"	2009	OJ da Juiceman	Bouldercrest Shawty
"Crazy Night"	2009	R. Kelly	Untitled
"Brown Skin Girl"	2009	Chris Brown, Sean Paul	Graffiti
"Warning"	2009	The Clipse	—N/a
"Activated"	2009	Pitbull	—N/a
"Replay (remix)"	2009	Iyaz, Sean Kingston, Nipsey Hussle, Bizzy Bone	Replay
"Go Hard"	2010	Iyaz	—N/a
"Dancer"	2010	Jason Derulo	—N/a
"Heartbeat Love"	2010	Janet Jackson, Pitbull, Machel Montano	—N/a
"One Life"	2010	Rick Ross	—N/a
"Struggles"	2010	Akon, G Stokes	—N/a
"Came Up"	2010	Ariez Onasis	The Heartbreak Kid
"Make Money"	2010	Lucky Lansky	—N/a
"Leave Me Alone"	2010	Machine Gun Kelly	100 Words and Running
"Hold Yuh (remix)"	2010	Gyptian	Hold You
"On It"	2010	J.Cardim, Ariez Onasis, Paul Wall	The In Crowd
"Home Town"	2010	DJ Benny D	—N/a
"Life is Ruff"	2010	DJ Benny D	—N/a
"My Home Town"	2010	Sway DaSafo, DJ Benny D	—N/a
"Billy Crystal"	2010	Yelawolf	Trunk Muzik 0-60
"Roll Around"	2011	Flo Rida	—N/a
"Fuck You Too"	2012	Jarren Benton, 2 Chainz	Freebasing with Kevin Bacon
"Runnin'"	2012	Machine Gun Kelly	Lace Up
"V.I. O.Gs"	2013	Paebak	—N/a
"It's On Me"	2013	Beni Haze, Pusha T	—N/a
"Do It for the Hood 2"	2014	Red Café, Akon, Maino	American Psycho 2
"Hispanic"	2014	Lil Bibby, Zuse	Free Crack 2
"Kill It 4 The Kids"	2015	Kill The Noise, AWOLNATION	Occult Classic
"Louder"	2015	Kill The Noise, Tommy Trash	Occult Classic

Victoria kimani China Love ft Rock city 2017 Samantha J ft R City

== Music videos ==
Year	Title	Album	Featured artist(s)
As main performer
2008	"Stop Lyin'"	—N/a	
2008	"Losin' It"	—N/a	
2009	"PTFAO"	Put the F*ckin' Album Out	
2009	"You Are"	—N/a	
2009	"Can I Get On"	Put the F*ckin' Album Out	featuring Verse
2009	"Hip Hop Props"	—N/a	
2010	"Takeover" (Drake cover)	—N/a	
2010	"Survivor Anthem"	PTFAO: Independence Day Part 2	
2010	"Tell It Like It Is"	—N/a	
2011	"BMF (Freestyle)"	—N/a	
2012	"Think Rich"	The American Dream	as Planet VI
2012	"Pray for My Enemies"	The American Dream	as Planet VI featuring Kardinal Offishall
2013	"Diamonds (remix)"	American Nightmare	as Planet VI
2014	"I'm That..."	What Dreams Are Made Of	featuring 2 Chainz
2015	"Locked Away"	What Dreams Are Made Of	featuring Adam Levine
As featured performer
2008	"Go Low"	The Solution	Beanie Sigel featuring Rock City
2009	"Breakup (remix)"	—N/a	Verse Simmonds featuring Rock City and Lunch Money
2010	"Make Money (remix)"	—N/a	Lucky Lansky featuring Rock City
2012	"She Will"	It's On	Jawan Harris featuring Planet VI
2013	"V.I O.Gs"	—N/a	Paebak featuring Planet VI
2015	"For Everybody"	Pure THC: The Hustle Continues	Juicy J featuring Wiz Khalifa and Rock City
Cameo appearances
2009	"Good Day"	—N/a	Greg Street featuring Nappy Roots

== Songwriting and production ==
Song	Year	Artist	Album	Notes
"Take You There"	2007	Sean Kingston	Sean Kingston	US #7
"Misses Glass"	2007	Leona Lewis	Spirit	UK #98
"Supervillain"	2007	Nicole Scherzinger	—N/a	
"Music for Love"	2007	Mario	Go	US R&B #26
"Rollercoaster"	2008	Janet Jackson	Discipline	
"Put It on Ya"	2008	Plies featuring Chris J.	Da REAList	US #31
"Rock Star"	2008	Prima J	Prima J	US POP #93
"When I Grow Up"	2008	The Pussycat Dolls	Doll Domination	US #9
"Crazy Night"	2009	R. Kelly	Untitled	US R&B #107
"Replay"	2009	Iyaz	Replay	US #2
"If This Isn't Love"	2009	Jennifer Hudson	Jennifer Hudson	US #63
"Runaway Love"	2010	Justin Bieber	My World 2.0	
"Man Down"	2010	Rihanna	Loud	US #59
"Raining Men	2010	Rihanna	Loud	UK #142
"Heartbeat Love"	2010	Janet Jackson featuring Pitbull, Machel Montano, and Rock City	Mr. Worldwide	
"Something Like a Party"	2010	School Gyrls	School Gyrls	US Dance #5
"Tongues"	2010	R. Kelly featuring Ludacris	—N/a	
"Oh Africa"	2010	Akon featuring Keri Hilson	Listen Up!	Hungary #4, UK #56
"Welcome to St. Tropez"	2011	DJ Antoine featuring Kalenna	2011	Hungary #5
"Eat It Up"	2011	Git Fresh	Eat It Up	
"You Will Be Loved"	2011	Nicole Scherzinger	Killer Love	
"So Many Girls"	2012	DJ Drama featuring Tyga, Wale, and Roscoe Dash	Quality Street Music	US #90
"Pledge of Allegiance"	2012	DJ Drama featuring Wiz Khalifa, B.o.B, and Planet VI	Quality Street Music	US R&B #48
"Time After Time"	2012	Angel	About Time	UK #41
"Murda Bizness"	2012	Iggy Azalea featuring T.I.	Glory	
"23"	2013	Mike Will Made It featuring Wiz Khalifa, Juicy J, and Miley Cyrus	—N/a	US #11
"We Can't Stop"	2013	Miley Cyrus	Bangerz	US #2, UK #1
"Someone Else"	2013	Miley Cyrus	Bangerz	US #93
"Bow Down/I Been On"	2013	Beyoncé	Beyoncé	
"Kisses Down Low"	2013	Kelly Rowland	Talk a Good Game	US #72, US R&B #24
"I'm Out"	2013	Ciara featuring Nicki Minaj	Ciara	US #44, US R&B #13
"Pretty Brown Eyes"	2013	Cody Simpson	Surfers Paradise	Canada #61, UK #61
"Win Win"	2013	B. Smyth featuring Future	The Florida Files EP	
"Pour It Up"	2013	Rihanna	Unapologetic	US #19, US R&B #6, UK #70
"Neva End"	2013	Future featuring Kelly Rowland	Pluto	US #52, US R&B #14
"Ain't Worried About Nothin' (remix)"	2013	French Montana featuring Miley Cyrus	Excuse My French	Wrote Miley Cyrus' verse
"Know You Better"	2013	Omarion	Self Made Vol. 3	US R&B #54
"It's the Weekend"	2013	Netta Brielle featuring B.o.B	—N/a	
"All I Want"	2013	B.o.B	Underground Luxury	
"Pure White"	2013	Doughboyz Cashout	—N/a	
"Wicked"	2013	Veronica Vega featuring Pitbull	—N/a	
"I Won"	2014	Future featuring Kanye West	Honest	US #98
"Everything Reminds Me of You"	2014	Tessanne Chin	Count on My Love	
"Shower"	2014	Becky G	—N/a	US #16
"Buy the World"	2014	Mike Will Made It featuring Lil Wayne, Future, and Kendrick Lamar	Ransom	US R&B #42
"Fuck Love"	2014	Iggy Azalea	The New Classic	
"Low"	2014	Juicy J featuring Nicki Minaj, Lil Bibby, and Young Thug	Pure THC: The Hustle Continues	US R&B #46
"My Main"	2014	Mila J featuring Ty Dolla $ign	Made in L.A.	US #103
"Party Ain't a Party"	2014	Jamie Foxx featuring 2 Chainz	—N/a	
"Be My Baby"	2014	Ariana Grande featuring Cashmere Cat	My Everything	
"Rich"	2014	Kirko Bangz featuring August Alsina	Bigger Than Me	US #105
"L.A. Love (La La)"	2014	Fergie	Double Dutchess	US #27
"I Don't Mind"	2014	Usher featuring Juicy J	UR	US #11
"Only"	2014	Nicki Minaj featuring Drake, Lil Wayne, and Chris Brown	The Pinkprint	US #12
"Trini Dem Girls"	2014	Nicki Minaj featuring Lunchmoney Lewis	The Pinkprint	
"The Night Is Still Young"	2014	Nicki Minaj	The Pinkprint	US #31
"In This Bitch"	2014	NLA	—N/a	
"Can't Stop Dancin'"	2014	Becky G	—N/a	US #88
"Die Without You"	2014	Candice Glover	Music Speaks	
"Damn"	2014	Candice Glover	Music Speaks	
"Passenger"	2014	Candice Glover	Music Speaks	
"Kiss Me"	2014	Candice Glover	Music Speaks	
"This Is How We Roll"	2015	Fifth Harmony	Reflection	
"Body Rock"	2015	Fifth Harmony	Reflection	
"On & On"	2015	Justine Skye	Emotionally Unavailable	
"I Bet"	2015	Ciara	Jackie	US #43, UK #56
"Lullaby"	2015	Ciara	Jackie	
"Dance Like We're Making Love"	2015	Ciara	Jackie	US #100
"Give Me Love"	2015	Ciara	Jackie	
"Kiss & Tell"	2015	Ciara	Jackie	
"All Good"	2015	Ciara	Jackie	
"Only One"	2015	Ciara	Jackie	
"Keep It 100"	2015	Keri Hilson featuring Young Thug	—N/a	
"Ain't Your Mama"	2016	Jennifer Lopez	—N/a	US #76
"All Night"	2016	Beyoncé	Lemonade	US #38
"Everybody"	2016	Elliphant featuring Azealia Banks	Living Life Golden	
"Love Me Badder"	2016	Elliphant	Living Life Golden	
"No Limit"	2016	Usher	Flawed	
"So Blue"	2016	Fantasia	The Definition Of...	
"That's It" (feat. Gucci Mane & 2 Chainz)	2017	Bebe Rexha	All Your Fault: Pt. 2	
"I Got Time"	2017	Bebe Rexha	All Your Fault: Pt. 2	
"Love Incredible"	2017	Cashmere Cat featuring Camila Cabello	9	Spain #45
"Juice"	2019	Lizzo	Cuz I Love You	US #82
"Tempo" (feat. Missy Elliott)	2019	Lizzo	Cuz I Love You	US Bub. Under #8
"Exactly How I Feel" (feat. Gucci Mane)	2019	Lizzo	Cuz I Love You	
"Lingerie"	2019	Lizzo	Cuz I Love You	
"Icy"	2019	Kim Petras	Clarity	
"Sweet Spot"	2019	Kim Petras	Clarity	
"Personal Hell"	2019	Kim Petras	Clarity	
"Broken"	2019	Kim Petras	Clarity	
"Blow It All"	2019	Kim Petras	Clarity	
"Do Me"	2019	Kim Petras	Clarity	
"Shinin'"	2019	Kim Petras	Clarity	
"Click"	2019	Charli XCX featuring Kim Petras & Tommy Cash	Charli	
"Been Thinking"	2023	Tyla	Non-album single (Note: Produced and written by Theron Thomas)	— (Note: "Been Thinking" did not enter the Billboard Hot 100, but peaked at number 36 on the Billboard Mainstream R&B/Hip-Hop Airplay chart.)
"Selfish"	2024	Justin Timberlake	Everything I Thought It Was	
"Would You?"	2024	Lay Bankz	After 7	
"Apt."	2024	Rosé and Bruno Mars	Rosie	
"Power"		G-Dragon	Übermensch	South Korea #3, UK #23, Malaysia #8
