= School Gyrls discography =

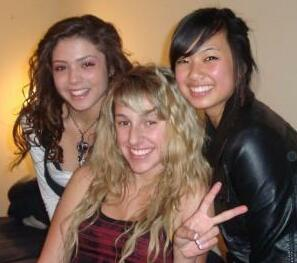
- Group members Jacque Pyles, Mandy Rain and Monica Parales.
- Studio albums: 2
- Singles: 5
- Music videos: 4

The discography of American girl group School Gyrls (briefly known as Forever) consists of two studio albums, 5 singles (including 1 as a featured artist), and 4 music videos.

== Albums ==
=== Studio albums ===
List of studio albums, with selected chart positions, sales, and certifications
Year	Title	Peak chart positions		Album details	Sales	Certifications
Year	Title	U.S.	U.S. Heat	Album details	Sales	Certifications
2010	School Gyrls	118	1	Released: March 23, 2010; Label: Island; Formats: CD, digital download		
2010	A Very School Gyrls Holla-Day	—	—	Released: December 14, 2010; Label: Island; Formats: CD, digital download		

== Singles ==
=== As lead artist ===
Year	Song	Peak chart positions		Album
Year	Song	US	US Dance	Album
2010	"Something Like a Party"	—	5	School Gyrls
2010	"I'm Not Just a Girl"	—	—	School Gyrls
2010	"Get Like Me" (featuring Mariah Carey)	—	—	School Gyrls
2010	"Going To The Mall"	—	—	A Very School Gyrls Holla-Day
2012	"Can't Stop This Night" (featuring Sade Austin)	—	—	Non-album single

=== As featured artist ===
Year	Song	Peak chart positions		Album	Certifications
Year	Song	KOR	K-Pop Billboard	Album	Certifications
2012	"The DJ is Mine" (Wonder Girls featuring School Gyrls)	8	9	Wonder Party	KOR: 1,173,192+ (DL)

== Unreleased songs ==
Title	Other artists
"The Power Goes Out"	—
"We Just Got It All"	—
"Oh Boy I Love You So"	—
"Good Love"	—
"You da One (School Gyrls Remix)"	—
"Headlines (School Gyrls Remix)"	—
"Pump Ya Breaks"	—

== Music videos ==
List of music videos, showing year released
Year	Title	Director(s)
2010	"Something Like A Party (Film Version)"	Nick Cannon & Alfredo Flores
2010	"Something Like A Party"	Nick Cannon
2010	"Get Like Me"	—
2012	"The DJ Is Mine" (with Wonder Girls)	—
2012	"Can't Stop This Night"	—
