= Mila J discography =

R&B recording artist discography

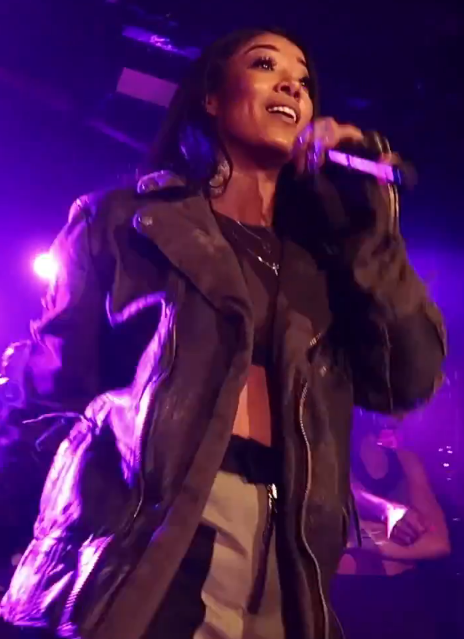
- Mila J performing in 2018
- Studio albums: 2
- EPs: 16
- Singles: 16
- Music videos: 18

The discography of Mila J, an American R&B singer, consists of two studio albums, five mixtapes, sixteen extended plays (EP), sixteen singles and eighteen music videos.

== Albums ==
=== Studio albums ===
List of albums, with selected chart positions
| Title | Album details |
|---|---|
| Dopamine | Released: April 7, 2017; Label: Silent Partner Entertainment, November Reign; Format: Digital download |
| Holiday | Released: November 29, 2019; Label: The Family Business Enterprises; Format: Digital download |

=== Miscellaneous ===
List of miscellaneous albums, with selected information
| Title | Details | Notes |
|---|---|---|
| Split Personality | Released: November 7, 2006 (Shelved); Label: TUG, Universal Motown; Format: CD | Originally meant to be released as Mila J's debut studio album, however, the album's release was ultimately cancelled for unknown reasons. Most of the songs were later used for her 2014 mixtape called Westside. On July 2, 2019, the album was digitally released by Universal Music Group. |

== Mixtapes ==
| Title | Details |
|---|---|
| Battlefield America Soundtrack, Vol. 1 | Released: May 18, 2012; Label: Silent Partner Entertainment; Format: digital download |
| Westside | Released: March 28, 2014; Label: Self-released; Format: digital download |
| The Waiting Game | Released: November 12, 2015; Label: Self-released; Format: digital download |
| Covergirl | Released: December 31, 2015; Label: Self-released; Format: digital download |
| MilauLongTime | Released: February 14, 2017; Label: Self-released; Format: digital download |

== Extended plays ==
| Title | Album details | Extra |
|---|---|---|
| M.I.L.A. | Released: October 14, 2014; Label: Motown; Format: Digital download | |
| Press Start (with BC Kingdom) | Released: May 15, 2015; Label: Self-released; Formats: Digital download | |
| 213 | Released: June 17, 2016; Label: Motown; Format: Digital download | |
| 11.18 | Released: November 18, 2017; Label: Silent Partner Entertainment, November Reign; Format: Digital download | |
| 2018 | Released: January 5, 2018 – December 30, 2018; Label: Silent Partner Entertainment, November Reign, The Family Business Enterprises; Format: Digital download | List of EPs: 1. January 2018; 2. February 2018; 3. March 2018; 4. April 2018; 5. May 2018; 6. June 2018; 7. July 2018; 8. August 2018; 9. September 2018; 10. October 2018; 11. November 2018; 12. December 2018 |

== Singles ==
=== As lead artist ===
List of singles as lead artist, with selected chart positions and certifications, showing year released and album name
| Title | Year | Peak chart positions | | | | Album |
| Title | Year | US R&B/HH | US R&B | Main. R&B/Hip-Hop | US R&B/HH Airplay | Album |
|---|---|---|---|---|---|---|
| "Complete" | 2006 | — (Note: "Complete" did not enter the US R&B/Hip-Hop Songs chart, but peaked at number one on the Bubbling Under R&B/Hip-Hop Songs chart.) | — | — | — | Split Personality |
| "Good Lookin' Out" (featuring Marques Houston) | 2006 | 64 | — | — | 63 | Split Personality |
| "No More Complaining" | 2006 | — (Note: "No More Complaining" did not enter the R&B/Hip-Hop Songs chart, but peaked at number 21 on the Bubbling Under R&B/Hip-Hop Songs chart.) | — | — | — | Split Personality |
| "Blinded" | 2012 | — | — | — | — | Westside |
| "Smoke, Drink, Break-Up" | 2014 | — (Note: "Smoke, Drink, Break-Up" did not enter the R&B/Hip-Hop Songs chart, but peaked at number six on the Bubbling Under R&B/Hip-Hop Songs chart.) | — | 22 | 33 | M.I.L.A. |
| "My Main" (featuring Ty Dolla $ign) | 2014 | — (Note: "My Main" did not enter the R&B/Hip-Hop Songs chart, but peaked at number three on the Bubbling Under R&B/Hip-Hop Songs chart.) | 21 | 28 | 41 | M.I.L.A. |
| "Kickin' Back" | 2016 | — | — | 31 | 29 | 213 |
| "Fuckboy" | 2017 | — | — | — | — | Dopamine |
| "Move" | 2017 | — | — | — | — | Dopamine |
| "La La Land" | 2017 | — | — | — | — | Dopamine |
| "No Fux" | 2017 | — | — | — | — | Dopamine |
| "Touch Me" | 2017 | — | — | — | — | 'Til Death Do Us Part |
| "Easier" (with Ej Jackson) | 2019 | — | — | — | — | — |
| "Thankful" | 2019 | — | — | — | — | Holiday |
"—" denotes a title that did not chart, or was not released in that territory.

=== As featured artist ===
List of singles, with selected chart positions, showing year released and album name
| Title | Year | Peak chart positions | | Certifications | Album |
| Title | Year | US | US R&B/HH | Certifications | Album |
|---|---|---|---|---|---|
| "Play Another Slow Jam" (as Gyrl) | 1995 | — | 74 | | — |
| "Play Another Slow Jam (Remix)" (as Gyrl, featuring Taz and Smooth) | 1995 | — | 74 | | — |
| "Get Your Groove On" (as Gyrl) | 1997 | 91 | 30 | | — |
| "How We Roll" (with Dame Four) | 2005 | — | — | | — |
| "Hot Box" (Bobby Brackins featuring G-Eazy and Mila J) | 2014 | — | — | | — |
| "Don't Get No Betta" (Timbaland featuring Mila J) | 2016 | — | — | | King Stays King |
| "On the Way" (Jhene Aiko featuring Mila J) | 2020 | 121 | — | RIAA: Gold | Chilombo |
"—" denotes a title that did not chart, or was not released in that territory.

== Guest appearances ==
List of non-single guest appearances, with other performing artists, showing year released and album name
| Title | Year | Other artist(s) | Album |
|---|---|---|---|
| "Take It Off" | 2005 | Omarion | O |
| "Disrespectful" | 2014 | Trey Songz | Trigga |
| "So What" | 2014 | B.o.B | No Genre 2 |
| "Body Parts" | 2015 | Jodeci | The Past, The Present, The Future |
| "Here & Now" | 2015 | DΞΔN | Here & Now |
| "Don't Get No Betta" | 2016 | Timbaland | Textbook Timbo |
| "Bad Gals Club" | 2016 | DJ Carisma, Honey C, Dawn Richard | — |
| "Hol' Up" | 2017 | iRich | Flexn |
| "Bad Intentions" | 2017 | iRich | Flexn |
| "Trpsx" | 2017 | iRich | Flexn |
| "2 busy" | 2017 | Tae Roads | 2 Late 2 Remember |
| "Selfie" | 2017 | Earanequa | My Vibe |
| "Ain't Ya Ex" | 2018 | Eric Bellinger, Tink | Eazy Call |
| "Change" | 2018 | Drummxnd | Fyi |
| "On The Way" | 2020 | Jhené Aiko | Chilombo (Deluxe) |

== Videography ==
=== Music videos ===
| Title | Year | Artist |
|---|---|---|
| "Diamonds and Pearls" | 1992 | Prince |
| "Complete" | 2006 | Mila J |
| "Good Lookin' Out" | 2007 | Mila J |
| "Blinded" | 2013 | Mila J |
| "Movin On" | 2013 | Mila J |
| "Smoke, Drink, Break-Up" | 2014 | Mila J |
| "So What" | 2014 | B.o.B. |
| "My Main" | 2014 | Mila J |
| "Times Like This" | 2014 | Mila J |
| "Hot Box" | 2014 | Bobby Brackins |
| "Pain In My Heart" | 2014 | Mila J |
| "Champion" | 2015 | Mila J |
| "Don't Get No Betta" | 2016 | Timbaland |
| "Kickin' Back" | 2016 | Mila J |
| "Move" | 2017 | Mila J |
| "New Crib" | 2017 | Mila J |
| "No Fux" | 2017 | Mila J |
| "Hol' Up" | 2017 | iRich |
| "Holiday : Freak Sh*t" | 2020—21 | Mila J |
