= Dopamine (Mila J album) =

Studio album by Mila J
- Released: April 7, 2017
- Genres: Hip hop; R&B
- Length: 46:47
- Labels: Silent Partner; November Reign

Mila J chronology
213 (2016)	Dopamine (2017)

Singles from Dopamine
- 1. "Move" Released: February 14, 2017; 2. "La La Land" Released: April 3, 2017; 3. "No Fux" Released: May 12, 2017

Dopamine (stylised in all caps) is the debut studio album by American singer Mila J. It was released on April 7, 2017, through Silent Partner Entertainment and November Reign Records. The album is entirely produced by iRich, who also happens to be featured as a vocalist on the track "I Do Love You." The name of the project is inspired by the book This Is Your Brain On Music by Daniel Levitin.

== Background ==
After being in two girl groups Gyrl and Dame Four and also appearing on tracks by RaRa, IMx, and Omarion, Mila J was set to release her original debut album Split Personality through The Ultimate Group and Universal Motown, but it was ultimately shelved. The album featured a number of appearances from artists on the T.U.G. roster, including proteges and its associates, such as Marques Houston, Young Rome, Rufus Blaq, and The Underdogs. Most of the songs were later used for her 2014 mixtape called Westside. From mid-2012 to early 2014, Mila returned to her career under the name Japollonia as an independent artist. She later reverted to Mila J and released her debut extended play (EP) Made in L.A. (2014). The EP was originally intended to be released as a full-length album.

In November 2015, Mila told Complex that her debut album would be released in 2016, stating: "It's been a while since anyone has heard something new from me, so I wanted to drop some new music for my fans while I'm working on my first full length studio album that will be released next year 2016." Instead of an album, she released her second EP titled, 213 on June 16, 2016.

On April 3, 2017, Mila confirmed the album title to be Dopamine. Mila told Essence magazine the album title was inspired by Daniel Levitin's book This Is Your Brain On Music: The Science of a Human Obsession: "It really broke down how our brain reacts to music, what's released when we hear a song, and why we like certain music," she said. "Dopamine is that chemical that's released when things just feel good. It is that favorite song and that favorite band. And, I just feel very very happy and free."

== Promotion ==
=== Singles ===
The first promotional single called "Fuckboy" was released on February 3, 2017. The track lyrically blasts men who are only in relationships for sex, with Rap-Up stating that the anti-“Fuckboy” anthem "allows the R&B songstress to flex on an ex while empowering others to do the same." The track has also been described as a "funky mid-tempo track". The official lead single, "Move" was later released on February 14, 2017. Its music video was unveiled on April 7 and was directed by Mila herself. The album's second single "La La Land" was released on April 3, 2017, and premiered via The Fader.

On April 21, 2017, Mila released a self-directed music video for the song "New Crib". The music video shows Mila with a braided hairstyle, posing in front of a white backdrop. Also, an unbraided version of her is seen packing her belongings and moving into a new living space.

The third and final single from the project "No Fux" was unveiled on May 12 accompanied by its self-directed music video. Speaking to Essence about the song and video, Mila says, "I wanted to present it in a pretty way. It sounds pretty, but what I’m saying is pretty real. And, as you follow the story, towards the end ‘No Fux’ is kind of showcasing those vulnerable moments in love."

=== Tour ===
Move Tour
- Tour by Mila J
- Associated album: Dopamine
- Start date: 24 March 2017
- End date: 23 April 2017
- Legs: 1
- No. of shows: 19
- Supporting acts: iRich, Jacob Latimore

To precede and promote the album, Mila embarked on the Move Tour through the United States. The 19-city tour began on March 24, 2017 in Miami, Florida. “This tour will be fun and all about the fans that’s why I wanted to do it. So I want all of y’all to come out and have a good time with me! See YOU soon,” Mila said in a press release.

List of concerts, showing date, city, country and venue
Date	City	Country	Venue
North America
March 24, 2017	Miami, Florida	United States	The Fillmore Miami
March 25, 2017	Tampa, Florida	United States	The Ritz Ybor
March 26, 2017	Orlando, Florida	United States	House of Blues Orlando
March 30, 2017	Atlanta, Georgia	United States	Howard Theatre Atlanta
March 31, 2017	Detroit, Michigan	United States	Saint Andrew's Hall
April 1, 2017	Ann Arbor, Michigan	United States	Blind Pig
April 2, 2017	Chicago, Illinois	United States	Credit Union 1 Arena
April 6, 2017	Cleveland, Ohio	United States	The Foundry
April 7, 2017	Philadelphia, Pennsylvania	United States	Theatre of Living Arts
April 8, 2017	New York City, New York	United States	Sound of Brazil
April 9, 2017	Boston, Massachusetts	United States	City Winery
April 13, 2017	Washington, D.C.	United States	Howard Theatre
April 14, 2017	Dallas, Texas	United States	The Cambridge Room at House of Blues
April 15, 2017	Houston, Texas	United States	The Bronze Peacock at House of Blues Houston
April 16, 2017	Phoenix, Arizona	United States	Celebrity Theatre
April 20, 2017	Denver, Colorado	United States	Cervantes' Masterpiece Ballroom
April 21, 2017	San Francisco, California	United States	Fort 1 SF
April 22, 2017	Sacramento, California	United States	Ace of Spades
April 23, 2017	Los Angeles, California	United States	The Forum

== Critical reception ==
Professional ratings
Review scores
Source	Rating
HotNewHipHop	3/4 stars

Dopamine was met with generally positive reviews from music critics. At Album of the Year, a website that aggregate reviews of music albums, which assigns normalized scores based on user ratings, the album received an average score of 63, based on 9 ratings. Adelle Platon of Billboard highlighted multiple songs from the album, such as "I Do Love You", "Fuckboy", and "Body". Kevin Goddard of HotNewHipHop said, "Laced with 13 tracks in total, the follow-up to last year’s 213 EP features explicit slow jams and groovy bops. The album also features a lone appearance from multi-talented LA artist I Rich, who appears on the track I Do Love You." Rap-Up added to their blog, "Mila J is giving fans a Dopamine rush with the release of her latest project." Elle Breezy of Singersroom said that Dopamine features "slow jams and bangers in the style of her carefree brand of female empowerment."

== Track listing ==
All tracks produced by iRich.

All tracks are written by Mila J.

No.	Title	Length
1.	"No Fux"	2:52
2.	"La La Land"	3:16
3.	"Transform U"	3:04
4.	"I Do Love You You" (featuring iRich)	4:15
5.	"New Crib"	4:29
6.	"Lit"	3:26
7.	"Doomed"	3:22
8.	"Longway"	2:44
9.	"Move"	2:47
10.	"Fuckboy"	3:52
11.	"Drippin"	4:31
12.	"Body"	3:59
13.	"Bonfire"	4:10

Sampling credits

- "La La Land" samples the song "Delay" by JMSN from his 2014 eponymous album JMSN.

== Charts ==
Chart (2017)	Peak position
US R&B Album Sales (Billboard)	21

== Release history ==
Region	Date	Format	Label	Ref.
United States	April 7, 2017	Digital download	Silent Partner; November Reign	
United Kingdom	April 7, 2017	Digital download	Silent Partner; November Reign	
Canada	April 7, 2017	Digital download	Silent Partner; November Reign	
France	April 7, 2017	Digital download	Silent Partner; November Reign	

== See also ==
- Mila J discography
- List of 2017 albums
