= Riot (Mandy Rain song) =

- Single/EP artwork

Single by Mandy Rain

from the album Riot
- Released: 23 January 2014
- Genre: Dance-pop
- Length: 3:08
- Label: Empire
- Songwriters: Amanda Moseley, Abram Dean, Brandyn Burnette, Danny “DJ” Score, Isaac Hasson
- Producer: Isaac Hasson

Mandy Rain singles chronology
"Think of You" (2014)	"Riot" (2014)	"Dare To Love" (2014)

"Riot" is the second single by American recording artist Mandy Rain. Riot was written by Mandy Rain, Abram Dean, Brandyn Burnette, Danny “DJ” Score, and Isaac Hasson, the latter of which also produced. Riot was released on iTunes on January 23, 2014 and to all other digital retailers on January 31, 2014 under Empire Distribution.

== Background and development ==
When Rain was 13 years old, she auditioned for the Nickelodeon series "Star Camp". Rain was chosen along with seven other kids to be in a musical group called "The Giggle Club". Shortly after season one was finished up filming, the Giggle Club had broken up so all the members could focus on their solo careers. After the series ended, Nick Cannon decided to groom Rain for a solo career. Cannon brought Rain to several record producers to record solo tracks. After hearing one of Rain's songs "Detention", Canon started girl group School Gyrls which went on to record two albums, star in several movies on Nickelodeon, and also tour in Asia and North America. After Rain and fellow School Gyrls' member Jacque Pyles decided to leave the group, they both started pursuing solo careers.

After the disbandment of the School Gyrls, Rain started working with producers Rock City and G-Production on new solo music. Rain released her debut single "Boogie" in 2011. During the three years after Boogie was released, Rain had signed with Empire Distribution and had begun work on writing and recording new material.

== Reception ==
"Riot" received positive reception from music critics. Ultimate Music called Riot a "beautiful and compelling pop-dance production"

== Music video ==
In an episode of the podcast, Fancalls, Rain stated how she was currently in the middle of production for the music video for "Riot".

== Track listing ==
- Digital download – Main Single
1. "Riot" – 3:08

== Credits and personnel ==
Personnel

- Amanda Moseley – songwriter
- Isaac Hasson – songwriter, producer
- Abram Dean – songwriter
- Brandyn Burnette – songwriter
- Danny “DJ” Score – songwriter
