= Riot (disambiguation) =

A riot is a form of civil disorder.

Riot or The Riot may also refer to:

== Film and television ==
- The Riot (1913 film), an American silent short comedy film directed by Mack Sennett
- Riot (1969 film), an American drama film
- Riot, a 1996 American action film starring Gary Daniels
- Riot (1997 film), an American drama television film
- Riot, a 2015 prison film with Dolph Lundgren
- Riot (2018 film), an Australian television drama film
- The Riot (2021 film), a Russian thriller film
- The Riot (2023 film), a Norwegian historical drama film
- Riot (TV series), a 2014 American comedy game show

== Music ==
=== Bands and labels ===
- Riot V, formerly Riot, an American heavy metal band
- Riot Entertainment, an Australian record label
- The Riot, an American drum and bass group co-founded by Vector Burn

=== Albums ===
- Riot!, by Paramore, 2007
- Riot!, by Joe Bataan, 1968
- Riot, by John Duncan, 1984
- The Riot, by the Rampage from Exile Tribe, 2019
- Riot, an EP by Mandy Rain, 2015

=== Songs ===
- "Riot" (2 Chainz song), 2012
- "Riot" (Bullet for My Valentine song), 2012
- "Riot" (Mandy Rain song), 2014
- "Riot" (Rascal Flatts song), 2014
- "Riot" (Three Days Grace song), 2006
- "Riot" (XXXTentacion song), 2015
- "Riot (Rowdy Pipe'n)", by ASAP Rocky, 2023
- "Riot", by Arty and Matisse & Sadko, 2013
- "Riot", by Azealia Banks from Slay-Z, 2016
- "Riot", by Bakar from Nobody's Home, 2022
- "Riot!", by Cher Lloyd from Sticks and Stones, 2011
- "Riot", by Childish Gambino from "Awaken, My Love!", 2016
- "Riot", by Dead Kennedys from Plastic Surgery Disasters, 1982
- "Riot!", by Earl Sweatshirt from Some Rap Songs, 2018
- "Riot", by Hollywood Undead from Five, 2017
- "Riot", by Jaden from Erys, 2019
- "Riot", by Jonas Aden and Brooks, 2019
- "Riot", by Kane Brown from Different Man, 2022
- "Riot", by Mykki Blanco from Cosmic Angel: The Illuminati Prince/ss, 2012
- "Riot", by Ola from Ola, 2010
- "Riot", by Open Till L8, featuring Hooligan Hefs, 2021
- "Riot", by Scooter from Ace, 2016
- "Riot", by Tedashii from Blacklight, 2011
- "Riot", by Trippie Redd from !, 2019

== Video games ==
- Riot (video game), a 1992 video game
- Riot Games, an American video game company
- Riot-E, a bankrupt Finnish media company
- Riot, a subsidiary of Telenet Japan
- RIOT: Civil Unrest, a 2019 indie video game
- League of Pain, a 1997 video game, released as Riot in Europe

== Comics and novels ==
- Riot (DC Comics), the name of two fictional characters from DC Comics
- Riot (Marvel Comics), the name of two fictional characters from Marvel Comics
- Riot, a manga by Japanese manga artist Satoshi Shiki
- Riot (novel), an historical novel based on the 1909 Pressed Steel Car Strike

== Information technology ==
- MOS Technology 6532 RAM-I/O-Timer (RIOT), an integrated circuit
- RIOT (operating system), open-source operating system for the Internet of Things
- Riot.im, an instant messaging software based on Matrix later rebranded as Element

== People ==
- Ryan Theriot (born 1979), nicknamed "The Riot", American baseball player
