= Good Lookin' Out =

2006 song by Mila J

Single by Mila J featuring Marques Houston

from the album Split Personality
- B-side: "Complete"
- Released: July 11, 2006
- Recorded: 2005
- Genre: R&B
- Length: 4:19
- Label: Universal Motown; The Ultimate Group
- Songwriter(s): Jamila Chilombo; Eric Hudson; Andre Merritt
- Producer(s): Eric Hudson

Mila J singles chronology
"Complete" (2006)	"Good Lookin' Out" (2006)	"No More Complaining" (2006)

Marques Houston singles chronology
"Sex Wit You" (2005)	"Good Lookin' Out" (2006)	"1st Time" (2006)

"Good Lookin' Out" is a song by American recording artist Mila J featuring vocals from fellow singer Marques Houston. The song was intended to serve as the second single from her debut studio album, originally titled Split Personality. The song was released on July 11, 2006, through Universal Motown and The Ultimate Group. "Good Lookin' Out" was written by Mila, Andre Darrell Merritt, and Eric Hudson. An accompanying music video was directed by Chris Stokes.

== Composition ==
"Good Lookin' Out" is an R&B song with a length of four minutes and eighteen seconds. It was written by Mila J, Eric Hudson, and Andre Merritt. Eric Hudson was responsible for the musical arrangement and he also produced it, while Chris O'Ryan handled mixing at Maddhouse Recording Studios, Los Angeles, with additional collaborator John Norten. Mila recorded the song at Maddhouse Recording Studios with engineering by O'Ryan. According to Tunebat, the song is written in the key of A-sharp minor and is set in common time with a moderated energetic dance groove, with a metronome of 166 beats per minute. According to Singersroom, "Good Lookin' Out" is an "uptempo R&B jam" that meets the standards of being radio friendly.

== Release and promotion ==
"Good Lookin' Out" was initially released on July 8, 2006, as a double A-side with Mila's 2006 single "Complete". Following the release of "Complete", it was distributed as the second single from Mila's debut album on July 11, 2006. It was sent to contemporary hit and rhythmic radio stations and received airplay on urban playlists alongside "Complete". A CD single of the song was first made available in the United States before it was released internationally in early August. Mila J performed the song on Rehearsals.com alongside Marques Houston.

== Music video ==
The music video was directed by Chris Stokes at a gas station located in Los Angeles, California, and premiered on July 31, 2006. It was included on the Top Hits USA Video VH-48 November 2006 compilation by HQ Music Videos. The video begins with Mila stopping at the gas station where Houston is under a car repairing it. Houston later gets up and comes to them. Mila is seen inside the car as she is arguing with her love interest. Her love interest tells Houston to repair the engine. As he opens the engine, Mila's love interest gets out of the car, and they then break up. She then goes into the diner. A dance routine featuring Mila and her backup dancers on the street is then seen during the chorus. Houston gets the phone on the desk as he and his love interest are arguing, and he then asks them to break up. Houston and Mila then go to the bar and chat. They then leave the diner and drive away in the car.

== Track listings and formats ==
CD single

1. "Good Lookin' Out" — 4:19
2. "Good Lookin' Out" (LP Version) — 4:18
3. "Good Lookin' Out" (Instrumental) — 4:19
4. "Good Lookin' Out" (Acappella) — 4:18
5. "Good Lookin' Out" (Call Out Hook) — 0:28
- Promo CD
1. "Good Lookin' Out" (Radio Edit) – 4:14

12' single

Side A

1. "Good Lookin Out" (Main)
2. "Good Lookin Out" (Instrumental)
3. "Good Lookin Out" (Acapella)

Side B

1. "Complete" (Main)
2. "Complete" (Instrumental)
3. "Complete" (Acapella)

== Chart performance ==
Chart (2006)	Peak position
US Hot R&B/Hip-Hop Songs (Billboard)	64

== Release history ==
Country	Date	Format	Label
United States	July 8, 2006	12 inch single, vinyl	The Ultimate Group
United States	July 11, 2006	CD single	Universal Motown
United States	July 31, 2006	Urban radio	Universal Motown, The Ultimate Group
Germany	August 21, 2006	CD single	Universal Music Group
United Kingdom	August 21, 2006	CD single	Universal Music Group
Japan	August 21, 2006	CD single	Universal Music Group
