= Slow Jam =

Slow Jam or variants may refer to:

== Music ==
- Slow jam, music with rhythm and blues and soul influences
- "Slow Jam", a song by Midnight Star from the 1983 album No Parking on the Dance Floor
  - covered by Usher featuring Monica on the 1997 album My Way
- "Slow Jam", a song by New Order from the 2001 album Get Ready
- "Slow Jam", a song by Four Tet from the 2003 album Rounds
- "Slow Jam 1", a song by King Gizzard & the Lizard Wizard from the 2014 album I'm in Your Mind Fuzz
- "Slow Jams", a 1995 song by Quincy Jones
- "Slow Jamz", a 2003 song by Twista with Kanye West and Jamie Foxx
- "Slow Jam", a song by Pulp from the 2025 album More

== Other uses ==
- Slow Jams, a 1999 graphic novel by David Choe

== See also ==
- "Slow Jam the News", a musical segment of Late Night with Jimmy Fallon
- "Slow Down (Slow Jam)", B-side to the 1986 single "Slow Down" by Loose Ends
- "Play Another Slow Jam", a 1995 song by Mila J as Gyrl
- Republic of Slowjamastan
