= Revolt (disambiguation) =

A revolt is opposition and resistance to a government's policies.

Revolt or Revolting may also refer to:

== Politics ==
- The Revolt, a 1951 book by Menachem Begin about the Irgun paramilitary organization
- The Revolt (group), an Israeli far-right militant organization

== Film and television ==
- Revolt (film), a 2017 American science-fiction film starring Lee Pace
- Harom Hara: The Revolt – 2024 Telugu film by Gnanasagar Dwaraka, a 2024 Indian film
- Revolt (TV network), an American cable television network, by Sean Combs
- Revolting (TV series), a 2017 British comedy series

== Music ==
- Revolt (3 Colours Red album), 1999
- Revolt (The Dreams album), 2010, and the title song
- Revolt (Wild Fire album), 2017, and the title song
- "Revolt" (song), a 2015 song by Muse

== Software ==
- Re-Volt, a 1999 video game by Acclaim Entertainment
- Stoat (software), an instant messaging platform known until October 2025 as Revolt

== See also ==
- All pages beginning with The Revolt
- Rebellion (disambiguation)
- Riot (disambiguation)
- Disgust
- Revolut
