= Revo =

Revo may refer to:

== Transportation ==
- Adam Revo, a small car manufactured by Pakistani automaker Adam Motor Company
- Evolution Revo, an American ultralight trike design
- Toyota Revo, an MPV produced by Toyota
- The eighth generation of Toyota Hilux pickup, known as Revo in some countries
- Honda Wave series motorcycle, the 110 cc version is sold in Indonesia as Honda Revo

== Entertainment ==
- Revo (musician), the leader of Japanese music group Sound Horizon
- R.E.V.O., a 2013 album by Walk Off the Earth

== Computing ==
- AspireRevo, a line of ION-based nettop computers by Acer
- Psion Revo, a Personal Digital Assistant made by Psion
- Revo Uninstaller, Microsoft Windows software to uninstall programs

== Other uses ==
- Revo (RC truck), a remote controlled truck manufactured by Traxxas
- Revò, a comune in Italy
- Revo Jõgisalu (1976–2011), Estonian rapper
- Reta Vortaro, a multi-language Internet-based Esperanto dictionary
- Revo (organisation), a non-profit professional body and membership organisation in the United Kingdom serving the retail property and placemaking industry
- Revo, a brand of heat-not-burn cigarette introduced by R. J. Reynolds Tobacco Company as a variation of their Eclipse (cigarette) product
- revo- was an unofficial early twenty-first-century proposal for an SI unit prefix standing for 10^{−33}

== See also ==
- Revolt (disambiguation)
