= Mathias Anderle =

American singer-songwriter

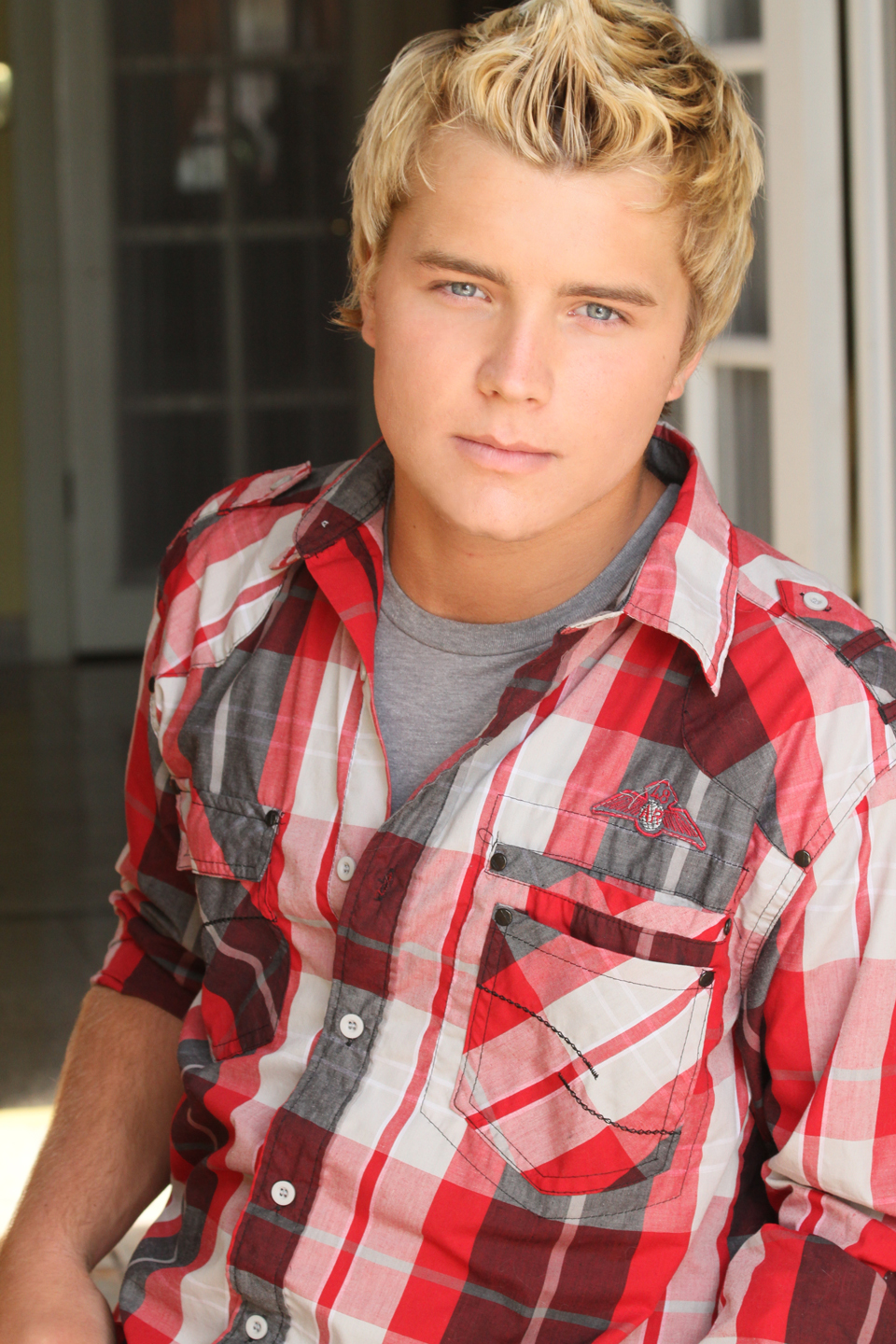

Background information
- Birth name: Mathias Cole Anderle
- Born: July 3, 1993 (age 31)
- Occupation(s): Singer, songwriter, musician, actor
- Instrument(s): Vocals, guitar
- Years active: 2009–present
- Labels: Razor & Tie (2009–11)

Mathias Cole Anderle (born July 3, 1993) is an American singer, songwriter and actor.

Anderle played the male lead in the Nickelodeon film School Gyrls, which was written and directed by Nick Cannon and released his first single "Shine On".

== Music career ==
In 2010, Anderle released his first single "Shine On" under the record label Razor & Tie which is featured on the Kidz Bop 17 album. The single peaked at #14 on iTunes.

He then released another single late summer 2010 entitled "Summertime" which peaked at #13 on iTunes. On March 11, 2011 he released a free single off his upcoming mixtape call "Gone". Mathias was part of a boy band called "Invasion" and was touring public schools. He was also part of a boy band called The Boy Band Project, with 4 others including Levi Mitchell, Brandon Pulido, Nick Dean, Zac Mann. They toured public schools and have various fans throughout most of America. The Boy Band Project released the single "Find That Girl" in 2013. The group parted ways in February 2014 announced over Twitter.

== Acting career ==
Anderle played the lead male role of Colin in the Nick Cannon film School Gyrls which debuted in early 2010 on Nickelodeon and Teen Nick. Also in 2010 he was an extra in the Kate Voegele music video for "99 Times" as well as the Jason Castro music video "Let's Just Fall in Love Again". He is featured in a "Baby Bottle Pop" commercial in which he sings the jingle. In 2011 he was an extra in the Caitlyn Taylor Love music video "Even If It Kills Me".

== Discography ==
=== Singles ===
- "Shine On" (2010)
- "Summertime" (2010)
- "Gone" (2011)
- "Find That Girl" (2013)
