= René Roemersma =

Dutch activist (1958–2021)

René Roemersma (27 March 1958 – 17 February 2021) was a Dutch activist and leader of the Dutch terror group Revolutionary Anti-Racist Action (RaRa). Roemersma was the only convicted RaRa activist.

== RaRa attacks and trials ==
RaRa attacked sites from Makro and Forbo and Shell gas stations. His goal was the withdrawal of those organizations out of South Africa. On 11 April 1988 Roemersma and 7 other suspects were arrested. Roemersma was the only one to be convicted: he got 5 years imprisonment. A higher court ruled that proof against Roemersma on 5 of the 6 attacks had been acquired illegally and he was acquitted. Only the conviction for a 6th (failed) attack was upheld, for which he was convicted to 18 months of jail time, 6 months of which was suspended. As he already had spent 12 months in jail awaiting trial, he was freed.

== After RaRa ==
From 2005 till 2006 Roemersma worked at the Panos Institute in Paris. In May 2006 he attended the Organisation for Economic Co-operation and Development (OECD) conference Deepening Voice and Accountability to Fight Poverty: a Dialogue of Communication Implementers. In 2006 he published a book, Verkiezingen in Congo, over loze beloftes en tellen tot diep in de nacht.

== Looking back ==
In November 2010 a Dutch TV program – Andere Tijden (Other Times) – brought a series of two documentaries on the RaRa group. A long interview with Roemersma was part of this series. Roemersma admitted being involved in the attacks, but did not elaborate on his involvement and did not say anything about committing the attacks. Still several Dutch newspapers claimed he had confessed the attacks. Because of the statute of limitations, no (new) prosecution could follow.
Roemersma did not confess or deny his involvement in the bombing of the house of Secretary of State Aad Kosto. No preclusion present, the Public Attorney considered re-opening the case against Roemersma, but ultimately decided against it.

René Roemersma died on 17 February 2021 in Santander, Spain.

== Sources ==
- (in Dutch) F. Hoekstra: In dienst van de BVD : spionage en contraspionage in Nederland, Boom Onderwijs (2004), 1^{ste} druk, ISBN 90-8506-023-0
- (in Dutch) Het dossier RaRa (1985–1993). College thesis, Utrecht University
