= Wild Fire (band) =

American Hard Rock band

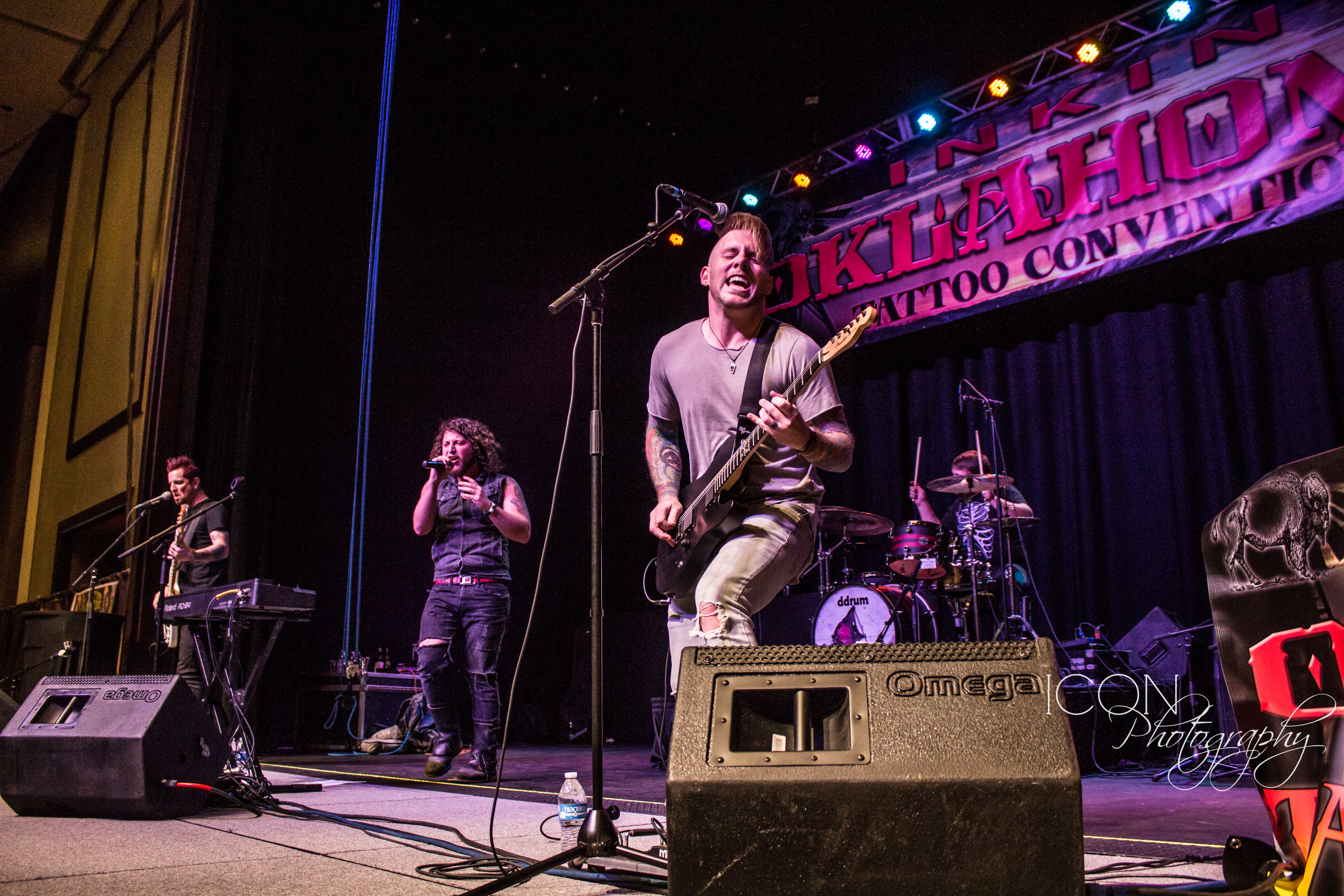
- Wild Fire during a live performance in October 2017. left to right: Tyler Voss, Zack Sawyer, Taylor Roberts and Cameron Alidor.

Background information
- Origin: Biloxi, Mississippi
- Genres: Hard rock
- Years active: 2015–present
- Spinoff of: Cathercist
- Members: Zack Sawyer; Kevin Bronner; Garrett Warman; Landon Alexander; Cameron Alidor
- Past members: Tyler Voss; Wade Sigue; Britton Hartley; Cameron Alidor; Taylor Roberts
- Website: wildfirebiloxi.com

Wild Fire is an American hard rock band founded in Biloxi, Mississippi, on November 5, 2015. it currently consists of Zack Sawyer (vocals and piano), Kevin Bronner (guitar), Garrett Warman (guitar), Landon Alexander (bass) and Cameron Alidor (drums). The band emerged from Cathercist founded by former Wild Fire guitarist Taylor Roberts. After Cathercist lost some band members they recruited new ones, which changed the band's musical direction. As a result, the band no longer felt comfortable performing under their original name and changed it to Wild Fire. Before this transformation, Cathercist had released two albums titled The Untimely Death of Zack Sawyer and As Hope Expires.

Wild Fire released their single, "Villain", on November 5, 2015, which was later included on their debut album released on May 23, 2017, titled Revolt. With this release, they also announced the end of Cathercist. Revolt contains 15 tracks, one of them a cover of Dr. Hook's "The Cover of Rolling Stone", the album's final track.

On March 29, 2018, Wild Fire announced in a Facebook post about an upcoming acoustic record and revealed that Taylor Roberts would be leaving the band. It has been reported that Alidor also left Wild Fire with Roberts, but the band has not confirmed this. On July 26, 2018, Wild Fire announced that Wade Sigue will be replacing Taylor Roberts as lead guitarist. Then on August 2, 2018, Sawyer announced their new musical project is called At the Lake House; each song from will be released independently, not collectively as an album.

On January 10, 2019, the band revealed through a Facebook livestream that their new drummer is Britt Hartley, and he will be replacing Cameron Alidor. Soon after this, it was reported that Hartley had already left the band. With no further comment, Zack Sawyer said “it wasn’t working out.”

== History ==
=== Formation and early years ===
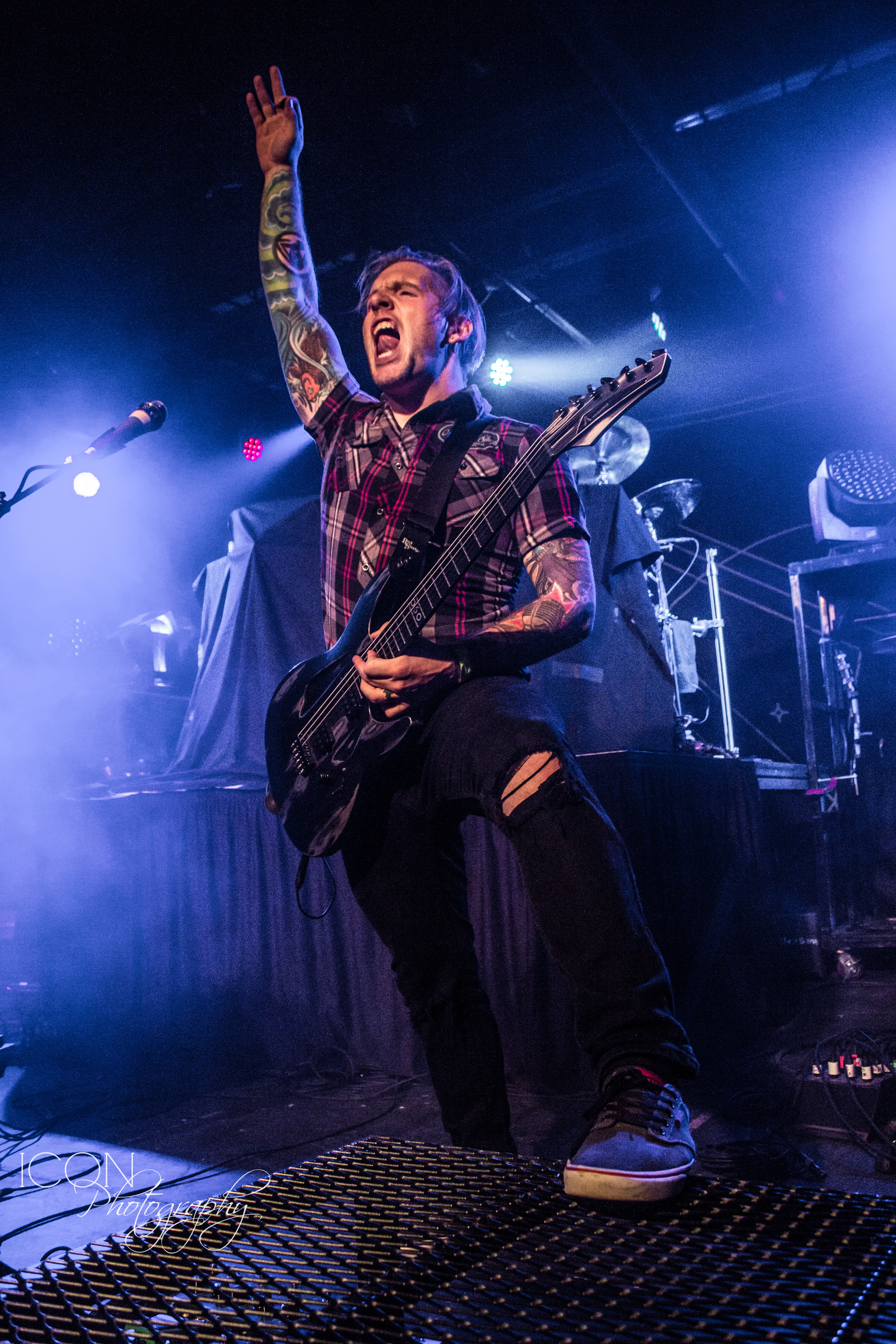
Taylor Roberts, former guitarist of Wild Fire and founder of Cathercist

Wild Fire was founded on November 5, 2015, in Biloxi, Mississippi. It evolved from the band Cathercist, which had been active for five years according to an article in the Sun Herald. Former Wild Fire guitarist Taylor Roberts founded Cathercist in Gulfport, Mississippi, but the exact date of the band's beginning is unclear. On their official page on ReverbNation the band says Cathercist was founded in 2007, while other sources say the band was officially established in 2010. During an interview, Roberts said the band was founded in 2005–2006. They appeared at the 2008 Taste of Chaos concert where they opened for Avenged Sevenfold, Atreyu, and Bullet For My Valentine. This indicates the band was active prior to 2010 and before Sawyer joined as the lead vocalist. The band adapted their name from the word "catharsis", which they defined as purging or cleansing oneself through music or art.

Cathercist released their debut album titled The Untimely Death of Zack Sawyer in 2011. The name represents the change Sawyer went through in the process of making the album. It was recorded in Argo, Alabama, at Echelon Studios, and was produced, mixed and mastered by Joseph McQueen. The band released their second album As Hope Expires on May 24, 2013. They began recording it a week after the release of their first album. It consists of eight tracks, four of which appear on Revolt, Wild Fire's 2017 debut album. The instrumentals were recorded in Miami at Bieler Bros. Studios over the course of a week and the vocals were recorded in Wisconsin. Matt LaPlant produced, mixed and mastered the album. In 2014 Wild Fire was the national winner of the Ernie Ball Battle of the Bands at Welcome to Rockville.

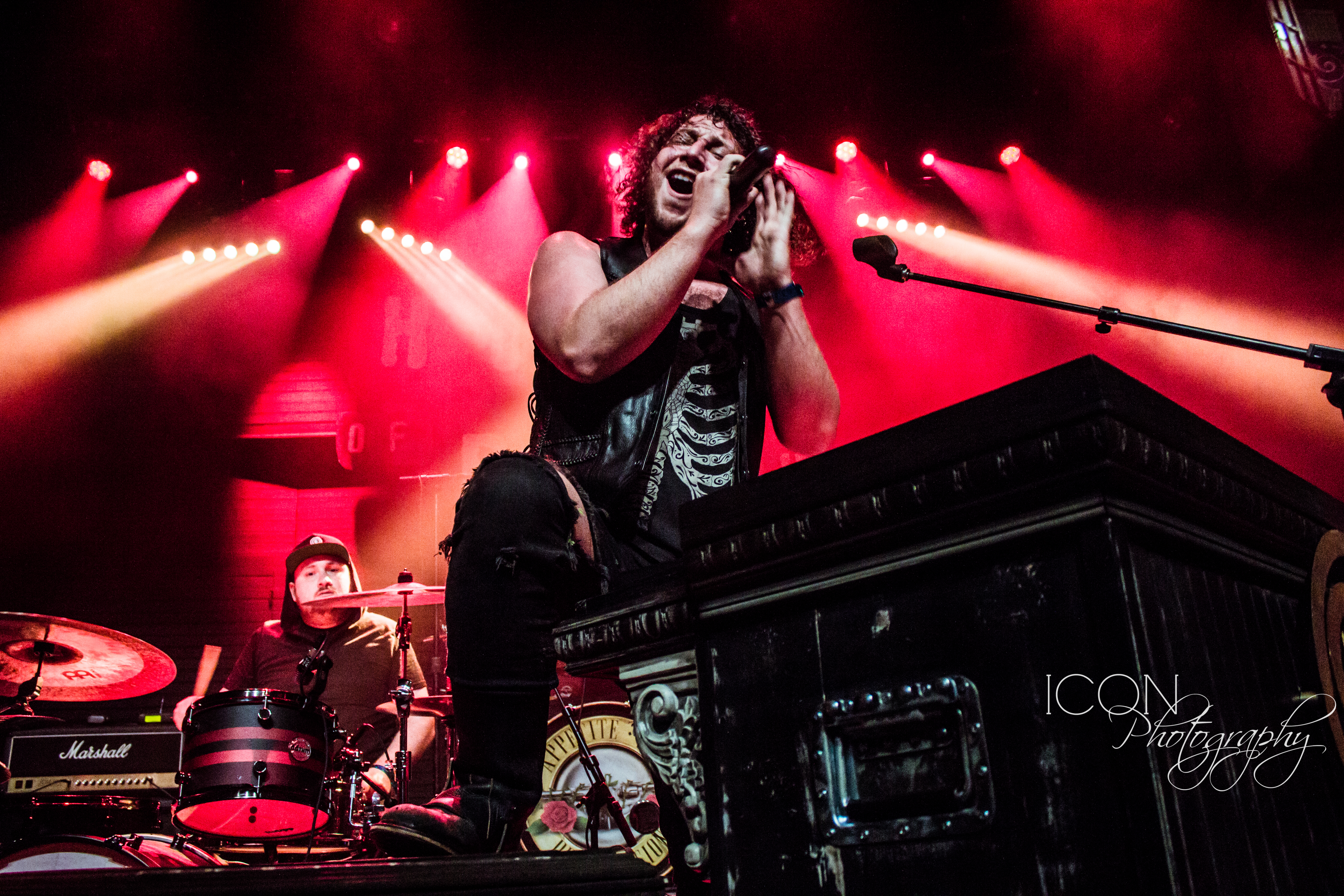
Pianist and singer Zack Sawyer and drummer Cameron Alidor in a Wild Fire concert

Wild Fire includes members from Cathercist, Zack Sawyer and Taylor Roberts. The other known members of Cathercist were: Aaron Buck (rhythm guitar), Hollis Godsey (bass guitar) and his brother, Chris Godsey (drums), Daniel Ferguson (guitars), Mikhail Cintgran (bass guitar), and Matt Marciana (drums). Tyler Voss and Cameron Alidor replaced them in Wild Fire. Sawyer became a member of Cathercist when he first met Roberts in Mobile, Alabama, in 2009. He was originally a member of a band called 35 Point Week. After they broke up Sawyer auditioned for Cathercist, who had also lost their singer, and was hired the same night.

With a new lineup and the release of the new single, "Villain", in 2015, they announced Cathercist was over and that the band would continue making music under its new name Wild Fire with Zack Sawyer on vocals and piano, Taylor Roberts on guitar, Tyler Voss on bass, and Cameron Alidor on drums. After the announcement, Cathercist's official website was taken down, and their Facebook account was renamed "Wild Fire".

When Sawyer was asked how Wild Fire emerged from Cathercist, he responded saying:

Taylor Roberts and myself were working on our record with our band Cathercist for a couple of years and then we lost some members. We were still continuing to work on it, but by the time the record was written, with the new people involved, it was just a different sound. It was something new, something we wanted to push forward with and something we really loved. It's not like we thought our fans didn't like it—we just didn't feel comfortable continuing under the same name. There were a lot of twists and turns to get where we looked up and said 'we need to change the name. It's time'.

Taylor Roberts said it was the beginning of a new chapter for them and with four members it felt like a different band with the lineup change.

=== 2017–present: Revolt and At the Lake House project ===
"While I'm not the author of the lyrics for 'Villain', the song is about, well, being the villain. We all have that side of us, deep down somewhere. That side of you is there whether you want to believe that or not and sometimes its just itching to break out and take control. Another aspect for inspiration, at least on my side of things, would definitely be the Joker. If you watch the lyric video, the main focus of the video is the Joker, the lyrics to me describe the insanity and utter villainy that the Joker exudes [...]"

— Taylor Roberts on "Villain"

The band released their debut album Revolt on May 23, 2017. Revolt contains 15 tracks and was produced by Matt LaPlant, who sang backing vocals for some of the songs. The song's official lyric video has had over 426,880 views on YouTube, and been streamed more than 600,000 times on Spotify. In total, all the videos containing the song on YouTube have more than three million views. The single peaked at number 82 on the Media Base Rock Charts in the third quarter of 2017.

In an interview, when Roberts was asked about "Villain", he said the song was about being a villain after he hinted he did not write the song. He cited The Joker as an inspiration, saying "there's always been something so fascinating about [Joker]. He's a villain you fall in love with and every now and again, you can find yourself in those same shoes, so his character becomes very relatable."

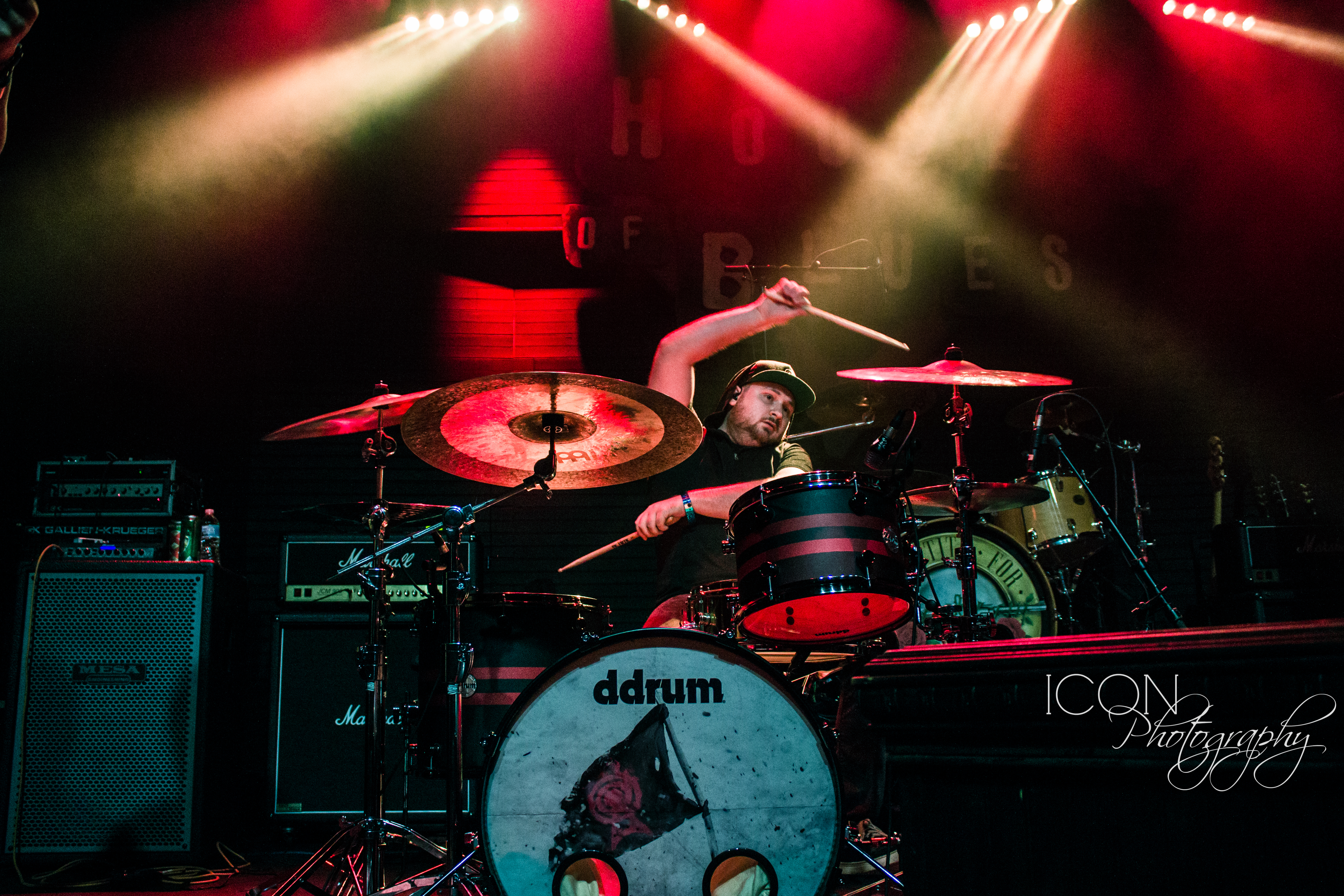
Cameron Alidor in a live performance on February 16, 2018

The band covered one of Dr. Hook & The Medicine Show's songs titled "Cover of the Rolling Stone", which is included on Revolt. Sawyer revealed that his cousin, Ray Sawyer, was a member in Dr. Hook & The Medicine Show which disbanded in 1985, not long after Ray Sawyer left the band to pursue a solo career.

Wild Fire has been featured at 1065 Fest 2016, Rocklahoma 2017, Gulfport Music Fest 2017, and Inktober Fest 2017.

The band began touring across the United States after the release of Revolt. They announced a show on September 5, 2017, in Mobile, Alabama, alongside Sick Puppies. Later, on November 14, 2017, they announced a show opening for Sleeping With Sirens in the House of Blues Parish Room in New Orleans on November 15. They also announced they had signed with Artery Global to fulfill their booking needs. In early 2018, the band announced a free concert at the House of Blues in New Orleans alongside Appetite for Destruction, a Guns N' Roses tribute band. Sawyer revealed plans for a new record in summer 2018.

On March 29, 2018, along with a statement of an upcoming acoustic record the band announced that Taylor Roberts was leaving Wild Fire. During a Facebook live stream, Tyler Voss and Zack Sawyer announced that the band will "no longer be genre specific", they also revealed that they will be trying to release a new song each month. According to former lead guitarist Roberts, the album features songs from their debut album Revolt re-recorded acoustically, along with some covers, at Sawyer's house in the last week of February. On April 25, 2018, the band released a single from the new album, which is a cover of Post Malone's "I Fall Apart", to YouTube. on May 2, 2018, Roberts performed his last show with Wild Fire.

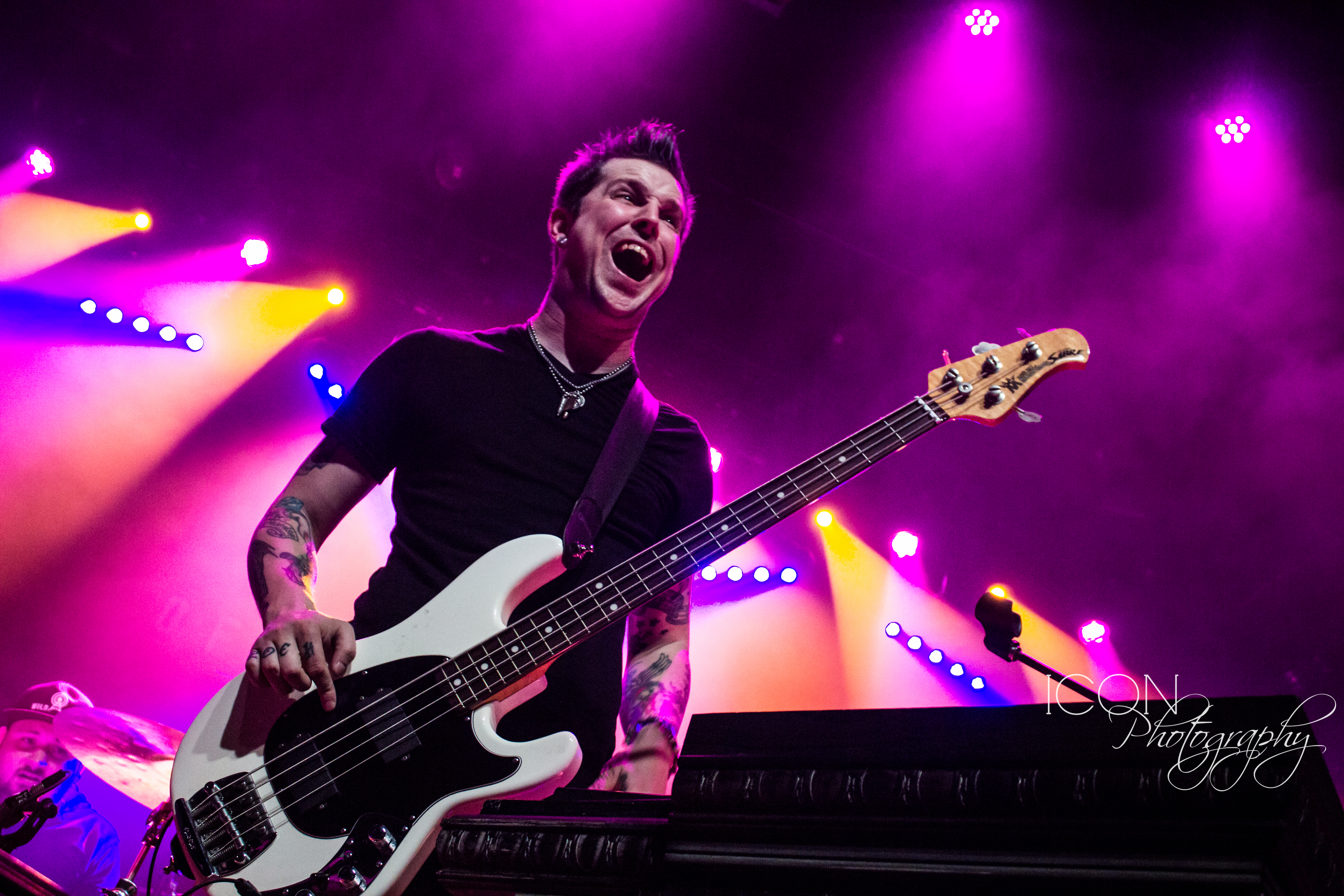
Tyler Voss has been the bassist of Wild Fire since its formation in 2015

On June 27, 2018, drummer Cameron Alidor also announced through a Facebook post that he will be leaving Wild Fire "to focus on other opportunities." It has been reported that Alidor left the band when Roberts did, but Wild Fire postponed the announcement. On July 11, Wild Fire broke the news to their fans on their official Facebook account, stating that "auditions are officially closed for guitar" and they are accepting auditions from drummers.

On July 26, 2018, Sawyer and Voss revealed via a video posted to YouTube and their social media accounts that the guitarist from Memory of a Melody, Wade Sigue, will be replacing Taylor Roberts.

On August 2, 2018, Sawyer reported the band will be releasing a collection of songs titled At the Lake House, but each of the songs will be released independently. Amongst the songs will be re-recorded tracks from Revolt and covers of pop songs. Sawyer reported that even though they announced they will no longer be genre specific, that does not mean they will leave hard rock behind. He said that At the Lake House was a project they wanted to do.

All the songs on At the Lake House will be acoustic. Roberts left with two songs left to be recorded. The guitar parts for those songs were written by Sawyer and producer Matt LaPlant. It has been reported that the band also stripped off some parts of the finished songs which were written by Roberts.

On November 6, 2018, the band released the second song from At the Lake House, which was a cover of Marshmallow's Silence.

On February, 14, 2019, the band published their first song since Silence titled "Earned It", with a noticeable stylistic change musically.

== Musical style and influences ==
Wild Fire labeled the genre of their music as "loud and aggressive hard rock" in 2015–2018. During an interview, former guitarist Taylor Roberts said: "We’re too hard to be hard rock but we’re not hard enough to be metal, so we’re kind of a nice little in-between [...] we hate labeling the genre that we’re in. We play music and we like to have a good time." After Roberts left the band, Sawyer and Voss both announced that they will no longer be genre specific.

After the announcement, some fans were led to believe that Wild Fire will be abandoning hard rock. Sawyer said:

We haven’t left the old sound behind exactly. People who love music tend to love all kinds of music. We’re just showing off a different side to our musical interests. The hard rock is not gone. This was just something we had to do. […] It just means we’re going to do whatever we want with little to no regard for what we’ve done in the past. It means that we’re a rock band that can do anything. If I want to write an acoustic song, I will. A pop song, a rap song, a country song. It means this band will fulfill all of our musical endeavors instead of making side projects to fulfill those ideas. We’re still making rock music.

The band is known for using classical instruments like pianos and strings on their songs, especially on the Revolt record. The band has seen a stylistic change with their new materials, stripping rock elements from the At the Lake House songs.

== Band members ==
Current members

- Zack Sawyer - Vocals, Piano (2015-Present)
- Kevin Bronner - Guitar (2021-Present)
- Garrett Warman - Guitar (2021-Present)
- Landon Alexander - Bass (2021-Present)
- Cameron Alidor – Drums (2021-Present)

Past members

- Tyler Voss – Bass (2015–2021)
- Wade Sigue – Guitar (2018–2019)
- Britton Hartley – Drums (2019)
- Cameron Alidor – Drums (2015–2018)
- Taylor Roberts – Guitar (2015–2018)

== Discography ==
- Revolt (2017)
