= Locked Away =

Single by R. City featuring Adam Levine

from the album What Dreams Are Made Of
- Released: June 29, 2015
- Recorded: December 2014
- Genre: Dancehall; reggae fusion
- Length: 3:49
- Label: Kemosabe; RCA
- Songwriters: Theron Thomas; Timothy Thomas; Lukasz Gottwald; Henry Walter; Toni Tennille
- Producers: Dr. Luke; Cirkut

Rock City singles chronology
"For Everybody" (2015)	"Locked Away" (2015)	"Make Up" (2015)

Adam Levine singles chronology
"YOLO" (2013)	"Locked Away" (2015)	"I'm So Humble" (2016)

Music video
- Locked Away (MV) on YouTube

Audio video
- Locked Away (Audio) on YouTube

"Locked Away" is a song by Virgin Islands production duo R. City featuring American singer Adam Levine, the lead singer of pop rock band Maroon 5. The song was released on June 29, 2015, by Kemosabe Records and RCA Records.

The song peaked at number six on the Billboard Hot 100, making it the duo's first top ten hit and Levine's first single that he did not co-write.

== Composition ==
Musically, "Locked Away" is a dancehall and reggae fusion song. According to the sheet music published at Musicnotes.com by Universal Music Publishing, the song is written in the key of D♭ major with a tempo of 94 beats per minute. The chorus follows a chord progression of D♭–B♭m–G♭–D♭–A♭, the verses follow a chord progression of B♭m–G♭–D♭–Fm, the bridge follow the progression Gbmaj7-D♭-B♭m-A♭ and the vocals span from B♭_{2} to A♭_{4}. The melody in the chorus contains an interpolation of Do That To Me One More Time by American duo Captain & Tennille.

== Meaning ==
The meaning of the song "Locked Away" seems to ask if you would truly love someone for your whole life despite all the flaws which may arise. As Theron—one of the song authors—explain:

“Locked Away” is based on our parents. Our dad went to jail for five years, came out and became a trash man. Then he worked at the legislature as a security guard. He didn’t make real money, he was on drugs, did all kinds of crazy shit. But our mom held him down. Our parents been together for 38 years—they’re still together. With the success of being a songwriter, where you can get fly and have all this nice shit, we’re like, “You really like me? If I was fucked up, would you hold me down?"

== Remix ==
The official remix is titled "Locked Away Again (The Remix)" and features an additional verse from American rapper Lil Wayne. It cancels the bridge by R. City and replaces their first verse of the original song to the third verse. The second verse is the same as in the original song.

== Music video ==
A music video for "Locked Away" was released on August 14, 2015.

The music video features four different families, a soldier leaving his family to return to service, a man (Theron Thomas of R. City) and a woman (Chantel K Davis) fighting to make ends meet, a man (Timothy Thomas of R. City) returning home to his child and the child's mother, and a father and daughter torn apart by an unlawful act. All suffering from vignettes of love, loss, poverty, and imprisonment, all set over Levine's crooned chorus "If I got locked away / and we lost it all today / tell me honestly / would you still love me the same?"

In the beginning of the video, a woman gets arrested, and a police officer gives her a Miranda warning, telling her: "You have the right to remain silent. Anything you say can and will be used against you in the court of law."

== Charts ==
=== Weekly charts ===
Chart (2015–2016)	Peak position
Australia (ARIA)	2
Austria (Ö3 Austria Top 40)	2
Belgium (Ultratop 50 Flanders)	2
Belgium (Ultratop 50 Wallonia)	13
Canada Hot 100 (Billboard)	2
Colombia (National-Report)	28
Czech Republic Airplay (ČNS IFPI)	4
Czech Republic Singles Digital (ČNS IFPI)	5
Denmark (Tracklisten)	4
Finland (Suomen virallinen lista)	6
France (SNEP)	4
Germany (GfK)	6
Hungary (Single Top 40)	10
Hungary (Stream Top 40)	9
Ireland (IRMA)	7
Israel International Airplay (Media Forest)	4
Italy (FIMI)	6
Japan Hot 100 (Billboard)	36
Lebanon (Lebanese Top 20)	1
Mexico Airplay (Billboard)	1
Mexico Airplay (Monitor Latino)	13
Netherlands (Dutch Top 40)	4
Netherlands (Single Top 100)	4
New Zealand (Recorded Music NZ)	6
Norway (VG-lista)	5
Poland Airplay (ZPAV)	1
Scottish Singles Sales (Official Charts)	2
Slovakia Airplay (ČNS IFPI)	1
Slovakia Singles Digital (ČNS IFPI)	5
Slovenia (SloTop50)	4
South Africa Airplay (EMA)	7
Spain (Promusicae)	7
Sweden (Sverigetopplistan)	4
Switzerland (Schweizer Hitparade)	2
UK Singles (Official Charts)	2
US Billboard Hot 100	6
US Adult Contemporary (Billboard)	11
US Adult Pop Airplay (Billboard)	2
US Dance Airplay (Billboard)	4
US Pop Airplay (Billboard)	1
US Rhythmic Airplay (Billboard)	8
Venezuela Pop General (Record Report)	18
Venezuela Top Anglo (Record Report)	3

=== Year-end charts ===
Chart (2015)	Position
Australia (ARIA)	42
Austria (Ö3 Austria Top 40)	41
Belgium (Ultratop Flanders)	36
Canada (Canadian Hot 100)	31
France (SNEP)	76
Germany (Official German Charts)	48
Hungary (Single Top 40)	74
Italy (FIMI)	57
Netherlands (Dutch Top 40)	23
Netherlands (Single Top 100)	31
New Zealand (Recorded Music NZ)	44
Poland (ZPAV)	46
Spain (PROMUSICAE)	66
Sweden (Sverigetopplistan)	44
Switzerland (Schweizer Hitparade)	44
UK Singles (Official Charts Company)	51
US Billboard Hot 100	40
US Adult Contemporary (Billboard)	46
US Adult Top 40 (Billboard)	26
US Dance/Mix Show Airplay (Billboard)	48
US Mainstream Top 40 (Billboard)	22
Chart (2016)	Position
Canada (Canadian Hot 100)	80
Italy (FIMI)	53
Spain (PROMUSICAE)	90
Switzerland (Schweizer Hitparade)	100
US Adult Contemporary (Billboard)	26

== Certifications ==
Region	Certification	Certified units/sales
Australia (ARIA)	3× Platinum	210,000^{‡}
Austria (IFPI Austria)	Gold	15,000^{‡}
Belgium (BRMA)	Platinum	20,000^{‡}
Canada (Music Canada)	2× Platinum	160,000^{*}
Denmark (IFPI Danmark)	2× Platinum	180,000^{‡}
Germany (BVMI)	Platinum	400,000^{‡}
Italy (FIMI)	4× Platinum	200,000^{‡}
Mexico (AMPROFON)	3× Platinum	180,000^{‡}
New Zealand (RMNZ)	3× Platinum	90,000^{‡}
Norway (IFPI Norway)	Platinum	40,000^{‡}
Poland (ZPAV)	4× Platinum	80,000^{‡}
Spain (Promusicae)	2× Platinum	120,000^{‡}
Sweden (GLF)	3× Platinum	120,000^{‡}
United Kingdom (BPI)	Platinum	600,000^{‡}
United States (RIAA)	Platinum	1,000,000^{‡}
^{*} Sales figures based on certification alone.^{‡} Sales+streaming figures based on certification alone.
