= Mandy Rain =

American singer-songwriter (born 1993)

- Born: Amanda Rose Moseley; December 20, 1993 (age 32); Hollywood, Florida, U.S.
- Origin: Los Angeles, California
- Genres: Pop, dance, urban pop, pop rock (early)
- Occupations: Singer-songwriter, actress, dancer
- Years active: 2007–present
- Labels: Teen Island, N'Credible, G-Production (former); Empire (current)

Amanda Rose Moseley (born December 20, 1993), known professionally as Mandy Rain, is an American singer, dancer, and actress.

Rain started her acting career at a young age. In 2007, Rain auditioned for Star Camp, a Nickelodeon reality show. Rain was chosen to join the show and its subsequent music project, The Giggle Club. The band disbanded shortly after the series' finale. Shortly afterwards, The Giggle Club's producer Nick Cannon worked with Rain on a solo career. Cannon eventually formed the girl group School Gyrls with Rain. In 2009, the School Gyrls released their debut self-titled album and starred in a self-titled television film which premiered on Nickelodeon. Later that year, they also released a holiday album titled A Very School Gyrls Holla-Day. Rain left the group shortly after the release of the holiday album to focus on their solo careers.

A year after the disbandment of the School Gyrls, Rain signed to Empire Distribution and released her debut single "Boogie". Her debut EP Riot was released in January 2015. The EP featured the singles "Riot" and "Dare to Love" with Kenton Duty.

== Early life ==
Mandy Rain was born as Amanda Moseley in Hollywood, Florida, on December 20, 1993. Mosley is the daughter of voice actor and comedian Mark Moseley. Mosley has one brother named Matt Moseley who is a professional dancer.

== Career ==
=== 2007–09: Career beginnings ===
When Rain was 13 years old, she auditioned for the Nickelodeon series Star Camp. Rain was chosen along with seven other kids to be in a band called The Giggle Club. Star Camp documented The Giggle Club as they recorded songs and performed live. During the filming of Star Camp, Moseley was given her stage name "Mandy Rain" by Nick Cannon. Shortly after season one, the Giggle Club had broken up so all the members could focus on their solo careers. After the series ended, Nick Cannon decided to prepare Rain for a solo career. Cannon brought Rain to several record producers to record solo tracks, while he drafted a sitcom concept, The Diaries of Mandy Rain, that he would pitch to Nickelodeon and Disney.

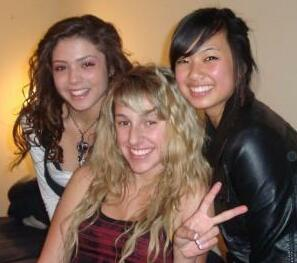
Mandy Rain (center) with fellow School Gyrls members Jacque Pyles (left) and Monica Ann Parales (right).

Sometime during 2008, when Nick Cannon heard a demo that Rain had recorded called "Detention", Cannon thought of the idea of creating a TV show about three private school girls who meet in detention. Rain's version of "Detention" was later featured in the first School Gyrls' debut album. Shortly after, Cannon created the girl group "School Gyrls" which featured Rain, Monica Parales, and Jasmine Villegas. After Villegas had announced her departure from the group to pursue a solo career, auditions were held for a new third member. The third member added to the group was Jacque Pyles . In the summer of 2009, Rain filmed the made-for-television film School Gyrls with her fellow School Gyrls members. After a bit of convincing, Cannon's friend L.A. Reid allowed his newly signed artist Justin Bieber to make a cameo in the made for television film. By the time the movie aired on Nickelodeon, Justin Bieber had become an international star, ensuring dramatic ratings for the introduction of the "School Gyrls".

=== 2010–14: Breakthrough with School Gyrls and solo career ===
In 2010, The School Gyrls released an album titled School Gyrls which served as the soundtrack to the film along with their debut album. The album spawned three singles, the first and only charting single "Something Like A Party" was a club smash hit, reaching a peak of No. 5 on the Hot Dance/Club Play chart, and stayed on the chart for 13 consecutive weeks.

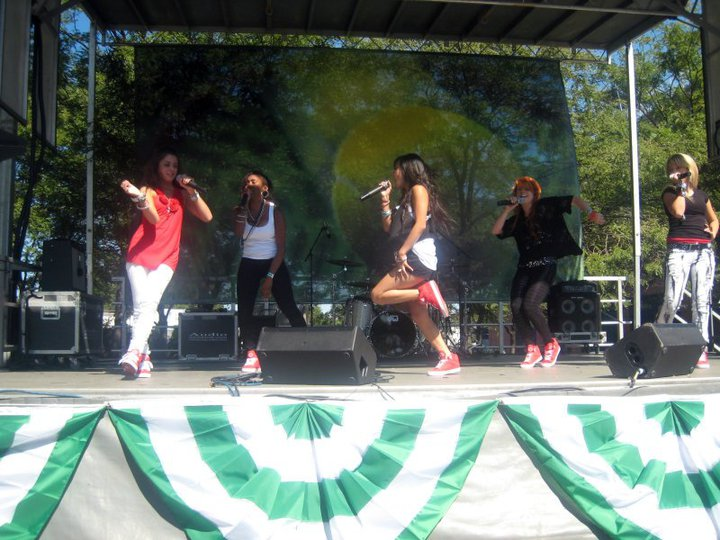
Rain performing with fellow School Gyrls' members in 2010.

Later in 2010, Rain released her first holiday album and second studio album with The School Gyrls titled "A Very School Gyrls Holla-Day". A movie of the same name was used to promote the album and was premiered on Nickelodeon like the first film. After the holiday movie had aired in January 2011, Nick Cannon began planning for the School Gyrls to star in a reality series. Rain stated later in interviews that she did not want to participate in the reality show, and the group's manager Nick Cannon was understanding of this along with Rain's urge to have a solo career, and let her leave the group under her request. In an interview on January 25, 2011, when asked about the future of School Gyrls, Rain stated that she had planned to pursue a solo career.

During an interview with Kevin Dees, when asked about her career, Rain said that there were several television pilots in the works and that she was currently working on her first solo album. In late September 2011, Rain announced that she would be releasing her debut single in October of that same year. She premiered a preview of the song on ClevverTV and also revealed that the song was called "Boogie". Rain released "Boogie" in October 2011. A music video was released several months later in March 2012 and was directed by Fernando Cordero. Boogie was supposed to be the first single off of an extended play by Rain, but after a year there has been no word whether she is still releasing the extended play.

In 2012, Rain began working with manager and producer Shawn Campbell on an updated musical and marketing direction. Rain is currently unsigned, but is managed by Campbell and Darrien Henning of production company "Push Music Group".

In October 2013, It was announced that Rain had signed a singles deal with Empire Distribution. Rain performed the National Anthem on December 23, 2013, at a L.A. Clippers game.

On January 15, 2014, Rain announced a new single titled "Riot", and that it would be self-released on January 28, 2014. In an interview with the podcast "The Pat Stone Show", Rain announced her plans to release an extended play towards the middle of 2014. On March 30, 2014, Rain's management, All Star Music announced via social networking site Twitter that Rain would be touring later in the year also adding at the end of the tweet #RIOTLIVE. The official video for "Riot" was released onto Rain's Vevo account on August 6. Rain announced on her Twitter that she would be releasing her single "Dare to Love" with Kenton Duty onto iTunes on September 16.

=== 2015–present: Riot ===
Rain made her debut extended play, Riot, for pre ordering on January 7, 2015. The EP featured singles "Riot" and "Dare to Love" along with four other songs and an "introduction" to the extended play. Rain made second appearance on web talk show "Pop Trigger" in an episode dated January 30, 2015. Rain announced in late January that she was filming a new music video for "Just Want to Love You" from Riot. The video was intended to be released on Valentine's Day but was never released for unknown reasons. Another music video for the song "Back to Bad" was announced on April 11.

== Discography ==
=== Extended plays ===
List of extended plays
Title	Album details
Riot	Released January 27, 2015; Label: Mandyland, Empire; Format: CD, LP, digital download

=== Singles ===
Title	Year	Album
"Boogie"	2011	Non-album single
"Riot"	2014	Riot
"Dare To Love" (featuring Kenton Duty)	2014	Riot
"Back to Bad"	2015	Riot

==== As featured artist ====
Title	Year	Album
"Stop" (Alabama Capital featuring Mandy Rain)	2012	Non-album singles
"Think of You" (K19 featuring Mandy Rain)	2014	Non-album singles

==== Promotional singles ====
Title	Year	Album
"Riot" (Brooklyn Remix)	2014	TBA

=== Music videos ===
List of music videos, showing year released and director
Year	Title	Director(s)
2007	"Jump Rope" (Note: With Giggle Club)	—N/a
2010	"Something Like A Party (Film Version)" (Note: With School Gyrls)	Nick Cannon & Alfredo Flores
2010	"Something Like A Party"	Nick Cannon
2010	"Get Like Me"	—N/a
2012	"Stop"	Stephen Sargent
2012	"Boogie	Fernando Cordero
2014	"Riot"	TBA
2014	"Dare To Love"	TBA
2015		TBA
2015	"Back to Bad"	TBA

== Filmography ==
=== Film ===
Year	Film	Role	Notes
2006	Canvas	Girl at birthday party	Uncredited
2009	School Gyrls	Mandy Rain	TV movie
2010	A Very School Gyrls Holla-Day	Mandy Rain	TV movie

=== Television/Web ===
Year	Film	Role	Notes
2006	Dance Revolution	Herself	
2007	My Super Sweet 16	Herself	
2007	Star Camp	Herself	17 episodes
2009	Party Monsters: Cabo	Herself	
2010	The Nightlife	Herself	
