= Smoke, Drink, Break-Up =

Single by Mila J

from the album Made in L.A.
- Released: January 29, 2014
- Recorded: 2013
- Genre: R&B
- Length: 3:34
- Label: Universal Motown
- Songwriter: Jamila Chilombo
- Producer: Eric "Cire" Crawford

Mila J singles chronology
"Movin On" (2013)	"Smoke, Drink, Break-Up" (2014)	"My Main" (2014)

"Smoke, Drink, Break-Up" is a song by American recording artist Mila J. It was released on January 29, 2014, as the first single from her debut extended play, Made in L.A. (2014).

== Music video ==
The music video for the song, directed by Blue Gregory, premiered via Mila's Vevo channel on March 20, 2014. Singer Ty Dolla Sign appears in the video.

== Remixes ==
The first remix of "Smoke, Drink, Break-Up" featuring French Montana, was released on May 19, 2014. The official remix of the song features Ty Dolla Sign, Kirko Bangz, and Problem was released on May 23, 2014.

== Charts ==
Chart (2014)	Peak position
US R&B/Hip-Hop Airplay (Billboard)	33
