= Something Like a Party =

2010 single by School Gyrls

Single by School Gyrls

from the album School Gyrls
- Released: February 9, 2010
- Recorded: 2009
- Genre: Electropop, Dance-pop
- Length: 4:19
- Label: Island
- Songwriter: Rock City
- Producers: Jordan "Trackstorm" Houyez, Gibson Kagni

School Gyrls singles chronology
"Something Like a Party" (2010)	"I'm Not Just a Girl" (2010)

"Something Like a Party" is the debut single by pop girl group School Gyrls. Produced by Jordan "Trackstorm" Houyez and Gibson Kagni and written by Rock City, the song was released on February 9, 2010. It peaked at number five on the Billboard Hot Dance/Club Play chart.

== Music video ==
Two music videos were shot for the single, one using behind-the-scenes footage and clips from the film, and the other an original music video.

=== Film version ===
This version includes behind-the-scenes clips of the girls on set, and clips of parts of the film. This version premiered after the film premiered on TeenNick on March 19.

=== Music video version ===
This version shows the girls in front of a wall with their name on it, dancing. Other scenes include the girls in a car driving to the club, along with the girls dancing in the club. The theme is about the girls able to get into the club, even though they are underage. When Jacque drops her real I.D the security guard goes into the club trying to find her, but fails. This version premiered in April 2010.

== Chart performance ==
=== Weekly charts ===
Chart (2009)	Peak position
US Hot Dance Club Songs	5

== Track listing ==
Digital download

1. "Something Like a Party" - 4:21
2. "Something Like a Party" (Jump Smokers Extended) - 4:23
3. "Something Like a Party" (Chew Fu Too Cool For School Fix) - 5:00
4. "Something Like a Party" (Ralphi Rosario Club Mix 1) - 7:48
5. "Something Like a Party" (Ralphi Rosario Club Mix 2) - 8:24

== Release history ==
Release dates and formats for "Something Like a Party"
Region	Date	Format	Label(s)	Ref.
United States	March 23, 2010	Mainstream airplay	Island	

== Mandy Rain version ==
"Something Like a Party"

Song by Mandy Rain
- Released: November 8, 2014
- Recorded: 2014
- Genre: Pop, dance-pop
- Length: 3:43
- Songwriter: Rock City

In 2014, former School Gyrls member Mandy Rain released a solo version of her band's hit single, "Something Like A Party", onto her SoundCloud page as a free download. Rain's new solo version of the song featured a new instrumental and also had new background vocals.
