= What Dreams Are Made Of =

Studio album by R. City
- Released: October 9, 2015
- Genres: Dancehall; reggae fusion; hip hop; pop
- Length: 59:03
- Labels: Kemosabe; RCA
- Producers: Eric Frederic; Lukasz Gottwald; Salaam Remi; Theron Thomas; Timothy Thomas; Henry Walter

Singles from What Dreams Are Made Of
- 1. "Locked Away" Released: June 29, 2015; 2. "Make Up" Released: September 18, 2015

Professional ratings
Review scores
Source	Rating
AllMusic	4.5/5 stars
Renowned for Sound	3.5/5 stars

What Dreams Are Made Of is the only album by production duo R. City. It was released on October 9, 2015. The album includes "Locked Away", which features Maroon 5 lead vocalist Adam Levine. The single peaked at number one on the Billboard Mainstream Top 40 chart.

== Track listing ==
What Dreams Are Made Of
No.	Title	Writer(s)	Producer(s)	Length
1.	"Like This"	Theron Thomas; Timothy Thomas; Lukasz Gottwald; Henry Walter	Dr. Luke; Cirkut	2:50
2.	"Locked Away" (featuring Adam Levine)	Theron T.; Timothy T.; Gottwald; Walter; Toni Tennille	Dr. Luke; Cirkut	3:47
3.	"Checking for You"	Theron T.; Timothy T.; Gottwald; Walter; Salaam Remi	Dr. Luke; Cirkut	3:34
4.	"Take You Down"	Theron T.; Timothy T.; Gottwald; Walter; Eric Frederic	Dr. Luke; Cirkut	4:06
5.	"Broadway"	Theron T.; Timothy T.; Gottwald; Walter; Remi; Barrington Ainsworth Levy; Paul Donald Love	Remi; Dr. Luke; Cirkut	3:57
6.	"Over"	Theron T.; Timothy T.; Gottwald; Walter; Lenny Kravitz	Dr. Luke; Cirkut	3:32
7.	"Make Up" (featuring Chloe Angelides)	Theron T.; Timothy T.; Gottwald; Walter; Gamal Lewis	Dr. Luke; Cirkut	3:26
8.	"Again"	Theron T.; Timothy T.; Gottwald; Walter	Dr. Luke; Cirkut	3:54
9.	"Live By the Gun" (featuring Akon)	Theron T.; Timothy T.; Gottwald; Walter; Melvin Hough II; Rivelino Raoul Wouter	Dr. Luke; Cirkut; Mel & Mus	3:43
10.	"Slave to the Dollar"	Theron T.; Timothy T.; Gottwald; Cameron Wallace; Walter	Dr. Luke; Cirkut; Wallace	3:51
11.	"Save My Soul"	Theron T.; Timothy T.; Gottwald; Walter	Dr. Luke; Cirkut	4:01
12.	"Crazy Love" (featuring Tarrus Riley)	Theron T.; Timothy T.; Gottwald; Walter; Mitchum Chin; Dwayne Chin-Quee; Stephen Kozmeniuk	Dr. Luke; Cirkut; Chin-Quee; KOZ	3:33
13.	"Don't You Worry"	Theron T.; Timothy T.; Gottwald; Walter	Dr. Luke; Cirkut	3:54
14.	"Our Story"	Theron T.; Timothy T.; Gottwald; Walter; Jevon Hill	Dr. Luke; Cirkut; Hill	10:56
Total length:				59:03

Notes

- "Locked Away" borrows its hook from Captain & Tennille's 1979 single "Do That to Me One More Time", written by Toni Tennille.
- "Over" is built on heavy sampling from Lenny Kravitz's 1991 single "It Ain't Over 'til It's Over".
- "Make Up" was recorded with Christina Aguilera but this version was scrapped for unknown reasons. A short part of the song leaked online.

== Charts ==
Chart (2015)	Peak position
US Billboard 200	25
