= A Very School Gyrls Holla-Day =

Studio album by School Gyrls
- Released: December 3, 2010 on Nick and December 14, 2010 on TeenNick
- Recorded: 2010
- Genre: Christmas
- Length: 20:36
- Label: Island
- Producers: Kevin Milledge II; Kevin Writer

School Gyrls chronology
School Gyrls (2010)	A Very School Gyrls Holla-Day (2010)

Singles from A Very School Gyrls Holla-Day
- 1. "Going to the Mall" Released: December 2010

A Very School Gyrls Holla-Day is the second and final album by American girl group School Gyrls released in the U.S. on December 14, 2010. It was preceded by the single "Going to the Mall".

== Background ==
After their second television film, "A Very School Gyrls Holla-Day", was released, the girls released their second full-length studio album. Directed by Nick Cannon, the film follows the members of School Gyrls as they attempt to save their high school’s holiday showcase while navigating rivalries and musical challenges. The group promoted the album by performing the only single "Going to the Mall" at various locations. The album was only released in the United States, with no plans for the album to be released in any other territories. This is also the final album that features two out of three original members of the School Gyrls, Mandy Rain and Jacque Nimble.

== Commercial performance ==
Unlike their previous album, School Gyrls, the album failed to chart in any territories in the world.

== Track listing ==
1. "Going to the Mall" – 3:29
2. "We Wish You a Merry Christmas" – 3:02
3. "O Christmas Tree" – 2:37
4. "12 Days" – 3:30
5. "Party Bag" – 2:29
6. "Jingle Bells" (featuring Aaron Fresh) – 2:55
7. "Deck the Halls" – 2:34

== Release history ==
Region	Date	Format	Label
United States	December 14, 2010	Digital download	Island Records
