= Revolt (Wild Fire album) =

2017 studio album by Wild Fire

Studio album by Wild Fire
- Released: May 23, 2017
- Recorded: 2015–2017
- Studio: Madtown Mix Studio
- Genre: Hard rock
- Length: 48:35
- Producer: Matt LaPlant

Singles from Revolt
- 1. "Villain" Released: November 15, 2015

Revolt is the debut album of the American rock band Wild Fire. It was released on May 23, 2017 and was produced, mixed, and mastered by Matt LaPlant, who also sang backing vocals for some of the tracks and worked with the band on their previous works. The album consists of 15 tracks, including "Villain", which was the first single to be released from the album. In total, all the videos containing the song on YouTube have more than three million views. The single peaked at number 82 on the Media Base Rock Charts in the third quarter of 2017. The album's final track is a cover of "The Cover of Rolling Stone", which was written by Shel Silverstein.

Some of the songs on the album were written and recorded for previous albums but were included on the album anyway. During the Cathercist era of the band, they released an album called As Hope Expires on May 24, 2013. It consisted of eight tracks, four of which appear on Revolt.

== Songs ==
=== Villain ===
"Villain" is the first single and the most successful track on Revolt since its release on November 15, 2015 (later May 23, 2017 on the album), with over 600,000 streams on Spotify and three million views, in total, on every YouTube video that contains the song. The single also peaked at number 82 on the Media Base Rock Charts in the third quarter of 2017.

The song is written by lead vocalist and pianist Zack Sawyer, and former lead guitarist Taylor Roberts cites The Joker as an inspiration. Roberts said:

While I'm not the author of the lyrics for "Villain", the song is about, well, being the villain. We all have that side of us, deep down somewhere. That side of you is there whether you want to believe that or not and sometimes its just itching to break out and take control. Another aspect for inspiration, at least on my side of things, would definitely be the Joker. If you watch the lyric video, the main focus of the video is the Joker, the lyrics to me describe the insanity and utter villainy that the Joker exudes [...]

"Villain" is the fifth track on the album and it has its own lyric music video on YouTube. Part of the lyrics in the original single, which was removed in the album version, is sung growling and it became the inspiration to name the band Wild Fire: "I illuminate the night / I bring chaos to the empire / wildfire burning bright." The band chose to leave out the growling part in the album version and simply replace it with an instrumental break.

== Track listing ==
All track listings taken from the original album cover.

All music is composed by Wild Fire.

No.	Title	Length
1.	"The Resistance"	1:44
2.	"Revolt"	4:56
3.	"Hope In Darkness"	3:13
4.	"Not An Option"	4:23
5.	"Villain"	3:44
6.	"Nightmare"	3:17
7.	"Rage"	3:25
8.	"Everybody Knows" (Leonard Cohen)	4:12
9.	"In Memory Of"	0:49
10.	"Disconnected"	4:36
11.	"Fight or Flight"	3:16
12.	"I Need A Surgeon"	3:30
13.	"Bad Memory"	3:23
14.	"Envy"	3:42
15.	"The Cover of Rolling Stone" (Shel Silverstein)	3:05
Total length:		48:35

== Personnel ==
Band members

- Zack Sawyer – vocals, guitars, piano
- Taylor Roberts – guitars
- Tyler Voss – bass
- Cameron Alidor – drums

Others

- Matt LaPlant – backing vocals, producer, mixer and engineer
- Matt Marciana – drums
- George Mason – strings
- Matt Waddle
- Dustin Sisson
