= R. City =

American hip-hop duo

Rock City
- Also known as: 2Ekwip (2003–2004); Planet VI (2004–2008)
- Born: Theron Makiel Thomas; March 13, 1982 (age 44); Timothy Jahmali Thomas; January 17, 1984 (age 42)
- Origin: Saint Thomas, U.S. Virgin Islands
- Genres: Hip-hop; pop; R&B; calypso
- Occupations: Record producers; singers; songwriters; rappers
- Years active: 2003–present
- Labels: Rebelution; Kemosabe; RCA; Worldwide; Konvict; KonLive; Geffen; Interscope
- Members: Theron "Uptown AP" Thomas; Timothy "A.I." Thomas

R. City (short for Rock City; and formerly Planet VI and 2Ekwip) is a U.S. Virgin Islander hip-hop recording and production duo, formed in 2003 by the brothers Theron "Uptown AP" Thomas and Timothy "A.I." Thomas. Primarily known as a songwriting and record production team, the duo amassed numerous credits for prominent music industry acts prior to signing with Kemosabe Records, an imprint of RCA Records in 2014 as recording artists. The following year, their single "Locked Away" (featuring Adam Levine), peaked at number 6 on the Billboard Hot 100 and preceded the release of their debut album, What Dreams Are Made Of (2015).

Earlier, the duo signed in 2007 with Akon's Konvict Muzik and KonLive Distribution, imprints of Geffen Records and Interscope Records, having received their first commercial songwriting credit for Akon. They released the mixtape series PTFAO (Put the F*ckin' Album Out). Their 2008 debut single, "Losin' It", failed to chart. The duo parted ways with KonLive in 2011 and continued their songwriting work. Since signing to Kemosabe, they often collaborate with label boss Dr. Luke.

While releasing solo material, R. City also wrote and produced for other artists including Sean Kingston ("Take You There"), Miley Cyrus ("We Can't Stop"), Nicki Minaj ("Only") and Rihanna ("Pour It Up"). The duo contributed to two Grammy Award–winning albums: Rihanna's Unapologetic (Best Urban Contemporary Album) and Jennifer Hudson's album Jennifer Hudson (Best R&B Album). R. City helped with Ariana Grande's My Everything album which was nominated for Best Pop Vocal Album. Theron won the Songwriter of the Year, Non-Classical at the 66th Annual Grammy Awards for his credits throughout 2023.

== History ==
=== Early life and education ===
Theron and Timothy Thomas are natives of Saint Thomas in the United States Virgin Islands. As children, the brothers performed as dancers for a local all-girl rap group. They practiced a wide variety of music and received support from their parents. In 2000, the two left the Virgin Islands to pursue their music career in Miami. They initially performed under the name 2Ekwip. They had limited success on the Miami nightlife scene. During this time, Theron worked for Kroger and Timothy for Party City while in Atlanta. They moved back to St. Thomas in 2005.

=== Career beginnings and record deal (2006–09) ===
In 2006, the duo sold their first song, "The Rain," which appeared on American singer-songwriter Akon's triple Platinum–selling album Konvicted. By October 2007, R. City had written songs for performers including Chris Brown, Usher, Sean Kingston, Ashlee Simpson, Nicole Scherzinger, and Mary J. Blige. Early songs that saw chart success included "Take You There" by Sean Kingston (number 7 on the Billboard Hot 100), "When I Grow Up" by the Pussycat Dolls (number 9 on the Billboard Hot 100), and "Replay" by Iyaz (number 2 on the Billboard Hot 100). R. City signed a recording contract with Interscope Records, Geffen Records and Akon's Konvict Muzik and KonLive Distribution in 2007. During this time, Theron was known by the stage name "Da Spokesman" and Timothy was known as "Don't Talk Much." They were set to release their debut album, Wake the Neighbors, some time in 2008.

=== Label issues, Wake the Neighbors and Planet VI era (2008–13) ===
R. City created 15 self-released mixtapes between 2008 and 2012, many of which contained the acronym "PTFAO" (or Put the F*ckin' Album Out) in reference to the fact that the label had not given them a release date for their album. In 2011, the duo parted ways with KonLive and founded their own label imprint, Rebelution Records. They intended to release their debut album, Free At Last, on their own label, but the release date was later pushed back to 2009. Despite the tumult with their record labels, Rock City continued writing songs for other artists during this period. They penned Rihanna's "Man Down" and Justin Bieber's "Run Away Love." In 2013, the duo wrote numerous Billboard Hot 100 songs, including Miley Cyrus' "We Can't Stop", Rihanna's "Pour It Up", and Ciara's "I'm Out." "Pour It Up" appeared on Rihanna's album Unapologetic, which won Best Urban Contemporary Album at the 2014 Grammy Awards. The following year, Rock City contributed to three separate albums that received Grammy nominations — Miley Cyrus' Bangerz, Ariana Grande's My Everything (both were nominated in the Best Pop Vocal Album category) and Iggy Azalea's The New Classic (nominated for Best Rap Album).

=== What Dreams Are Made Of (2014–present) ===
In 2014, the duo signed with RCA Records and Dr. Luke's Kemosabe Records. Their debut studio album, What Dreams Are Made Of, contains themes of struggle relating to the brothers' often difficult upbringing in Saint Thomas. In 2015, they released singles titled "I'm That..." featuring 2 Chainz and "Locked Away" featuring Adam Levine.

Theron Thomas won the Grammy Award for Songwriter of the Year, Non-Classical at the 66th Annual Grammy Awards for his work on songs by Lil Durk, Tyla, Chloe Bailey, Ciara and Chris Brown, Cordae, Big Boss Vette, and Jungkook.

== Discography ==
The discography of R. City contains numerous singles, mixtapes, and one album. The group has released one compilation album exclusively in Japan (Songs That We Wrote) and has also released numerous mixtapes and singles.
