= My Main =

Single by Mila J featuring Ty Dolla Sign

from the album M.I.L.A.
- Released: August 27, 2014
- Recorded: 2014
- Length: 3:35
- Label: Motown
- Songwriters: Chilombo, Griffin
- Producer: DJ Mustard

Mila J singles chronology
"Smoke, Drink, Break-Up" (2014)	"My Main" (2014)	"Hot Box" (2014)

Ty Dolla Sign singles chronology
"You and Your Friends" (2014)	"My Main" (2014)	"Stand For" (2014)

"My Main" is a song by American singer Mila J featuring Ty Dolla $ign. It was released on August 27, 2014, as the second single from her debut EP M.I.L.A. (2014).

== Music video ==
A music video for the song was released on September 30, 2014.

== Charts ==
Chart (2014)	Peak position
US Bubbling Under R&B/Hip-Hop Singles (Billboard)	3
