= Revolutionary Anti-Racist Action =

Dutch terrorist group

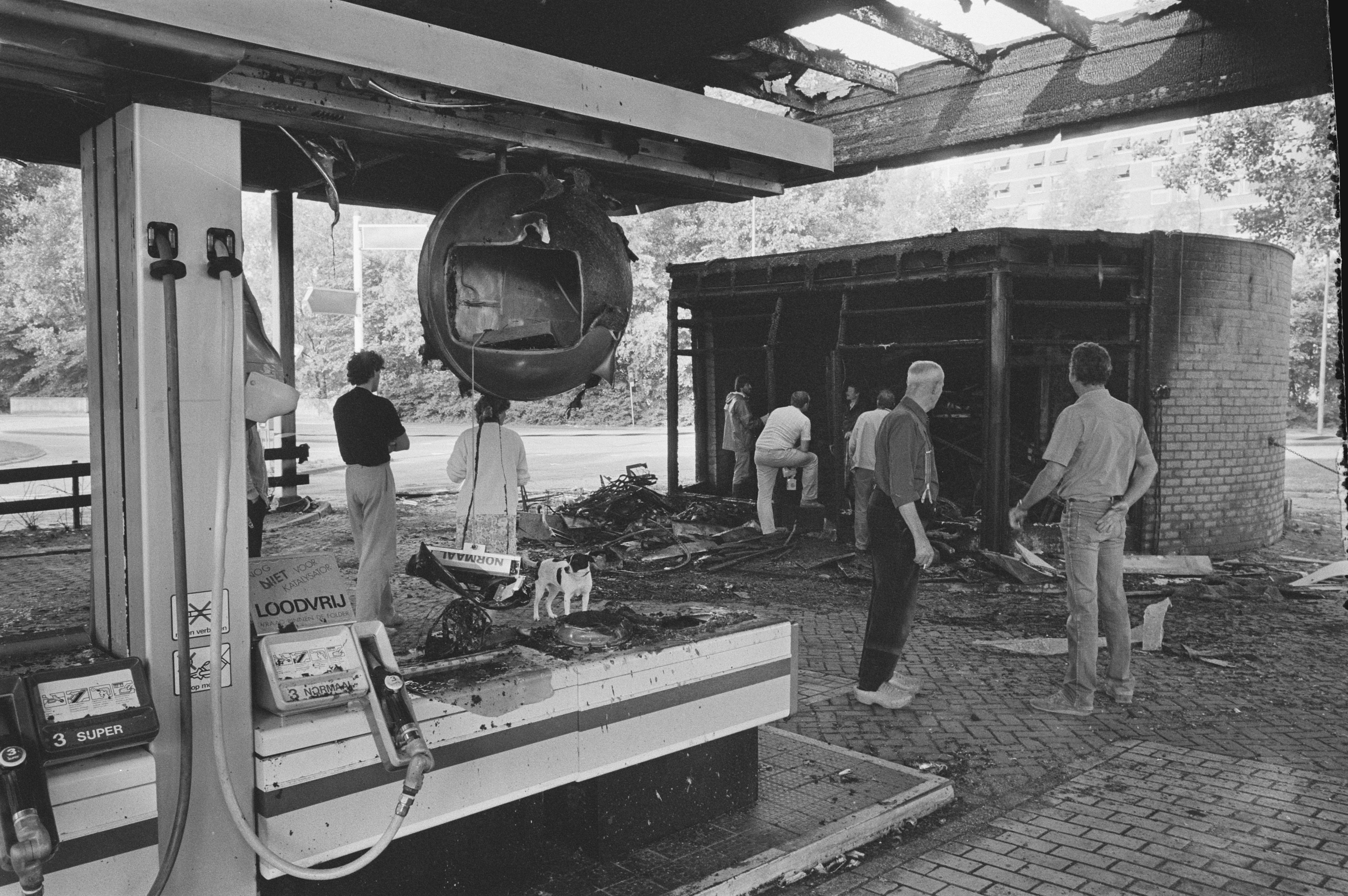
RaRa bombing of a Shell garage

Revolutionary Anti-Racist Action (Dutch: Revolutionaire Anti-Racistische Actie), often abbreviated RaRa, was a Dutch terrorist left-wing group. The name "RaRa" in Dutch means "Guess ..." (who we are) (from the Dutch word raden).

RaRa was active in the 1980s and 1990s within the Netherlands, bombing sites to express opposition to the apartheid policies of South Africa as well as to the Dutch asylum legislation. Their bombings caused a lot of material damage, but no deaths resulted.

== Makro and Van Leer attacks ==
In 1985 and 1986 RaRa fire bombed and destroyed divisions of Makro, a chain of wholesale traders. As a result, Makro ended all economic activity in South Africa. RaRa targeted Forbo, a Dutch maker of floor coverings, and Forbo also withdrew from South Africa. RaRa also bombed various facilities of the Shell oil company, because it expanded its business in South Africa. RaRa also set fire to the Amsterdam head office of the Royal Packing Industry Van Leer BV on 9 July 1986. The Dutch Interior Minister referred to RaRa as "terrorists" in connection with these arson attacks.

== SHV attacks ==
In January 1987 Steenkolen Handels Vereniging (SHV) pulled out of South Africa because of arson attacks by RaRa. The Dutch government had refused to insure SHV stores against arson attacks. Damages caused by RaRa arson attacks from September 1985 to January 1987 were estimated at $75 million.

One of the members of RaRa was quoted as saying, in connection with the SHV pull-out, "According to the rules of TV democracy, those with the most access to the media win."

== Arrests and conviction ==
On 11 April 1988 the police arrested 8 people they thought to be behind the RaRa bombings. Another person surrendered shortly thereafter, and a tenth suspect was arrested in May 1986. Only one of the suspects was prosecuted and tried, René Roemersma. He was convicted on four of seven charges, the most serious of which was arson, for his part in two 1986 attacks on Dutch wholesale traders, a January attack on a Dutch passport printer, and the sabotage of a Shell station in Nieuwegein. He was sentenced to 5 years imprisonment. A higher court subsequently changed the verdict to a sentence of 18 months imprisonment because some evidence was illegally obtained as the public persecutor during a search of seven properties had been temporarily absent. The others arrested at the same time as Roemersma were released for lack of evidence.

When Roemersma was sentenced, roughly 100 sympathizers protested outside the Amsterdam High Court, where they threw stones at the windows of the court.

== 1990s attacks ==
On 12 November 1991, RaRa bombed the private house of Aad Kosto, member of the Dutch government. In 1990 and 1991 RaRa also bombed the building of the Dutch Departments of Justice and of Internal Affairs. The Dutch intelligence service was surprised by the 1991 attacks.

After the 1991 attacks the RaRa claimed to "want to stop the asylum policy which abandons people, excludes them and dehumanizes them."

In 1993 RaRa bombed the building of the Department of Social Affairs.
