= School Gyrls (album) =

Studio album by School Gyrls
- Released: March 23, 2010
- Recorded: 2008–2010
- Genre: Pop, electronic, dance, pop rock
- Length: 31:53
- Label: Island
- Producer: Louis Biancaniello; Cutfather; Nick Cannon; Kevin Writer; Douglas James

School Gyrls chronology
School Gyrls (2010)	A Very School Gyrls Holla-Day (2010)

Singles from School Gyrls
- 1. "Something Like a Party" Released: February 9, 2010; 2. "I'm Not Just a Girl" Released: February 2010; 3. "Get Like Me" Released: 16 March 2010

School Gyrls is the debut album by American girl group School Gyrls, released in the United States on March 23, 2010. It peaked at No. 118 on the Billboard 200 and topped the Billboard Top Heatseekers chart. It was preceded by the singles "Something Like a Party", "I'm Not Just a Girl" and "Get Like Me".

== Background ==
After their own School Gyrls movie, the group released their debut album. Although no promotion was carried out and all of the singles failed to chart, the album was still released and charted on the Billboard 200. It was only released in the U.S. and has not been planned to be released elsewhere.

== Track listing ==
1. "Something Like a Party" – 4:21
2. "Detention" – 2:40
3. "What Goes Around" – 2:48
4. "Just a Kiss" – 2:54
5. "Something About Him" – 2:31
6. "I'm Not Just a Girl" – 3:22
7. "Extra Extra" – 3:15
8. "Get Like Me" (feat. Mariah Carey) – 3:15
9. "Uncool" – 3:03
10. "Cheater" – 3:48
11. "Operator" (US iTunes Store and international digital bonus track) – 3:22

== Charts ==
Chart (2010)	Peak position
US Billboard 200	118
US Top Heatseekers	1

== Release history ==
Region	Date	Format	Label
United States	March 23, 2010	CD, digital download	Island Records
