= Made in L.A. (EP) =

EP by Mila J
- Released: October 14, 2014
- Recorded: 2013–14
- Genres: R&B; hip hop
- Label: Motown
- Producers: DJ Mustard, K.E. on the Track, Eric Cire, Immanuel Jordan Rich

Mila J chronology
| Westside (2014) | Made in L.A. (2014) | The Waiting Game (2015) |

Singles from M.I.L.A.
- 1. "Smoke, Drink, Break-Up" Released: January 29, 2014; 2. "My Main" Released: September 30, 2014

Made in L.A. (M.I.L.A.) is the debut extended play (EP) by American R&B recording artist Mila J. It was released on October 14, 2014, by Motown Records. The EP features guest appearances by B.o.B, with the production, which was provided by DJ Mustard, among others. The EP was supported by two singles: "Smoke, Drink, Break-Up" and "My Main" featuring Ty Dolla Sign.

== Background ==
Billing herself as Mila J, she released her first single, called "Smoke, Drink, Break-Up" with the accompanied music video premiering on BET's 106 & Park. The song peaked at number 33 on the US Billboard's R&B/Hip-Hop Airplay. On May 28, 2014, she performed the song at BET's 106 & Park. After the lead single release, she was featured on Trey Songz's Trigga for their song, "Disrespectful" and several other projects. She is currently working on an album entitled M.I.L.A., which stands for Made in Los Angeles. She stated that the album will have a 1990s vibe to it and contains a lot of relationship-based songs such as "Pain in My Heart" and "Times Like These". B.o.B, Ty Dolla Sign, Problem are some of the features mentioned on this project. On August 27, she premiered the lyric video of her second single, "My Main" produced by DJ Mustard and features Ty Dolla $ign on her YouTube channel.

== Singles ==
The EP's first single, "Smoke, Drink, Break-Up" was released on January 29, 2014. The song was produced by Eric "Cire" Crawford.

The EP's second single, "My Main" featuring Ty Dolla Sign, was released on September 30, 2014, with the accompanied music video. Additionally, the production on the song was handled by DJ Mustard.

== Track listing ==
| No. | Title | Producer(s) | Length |
|---|---|---|---|
| 1. | "My Main" (featuring Ty Dolla Sign) | DJ Mustard | 3:32 |
| 2. | "Champion" (featuring B.o.B) | Immanuel Jordan Rich | 3:54 |
| 3. | "Times Like These" | Eric Cire | 3:38 |
| 4. | "Pain in my Heart" (featuring Problem) | K.E. on the Track | 3:58 |
| 5. | "Smoke, Drink, Break-Up" | Eric Cire | 3:32 |

== Charts ==
| Chart (2014) | Peak position |
|---|---|
| US Billboard 200 | 132 |
| US Top R&B/Hip-Hop Albums (Billboard) | 22 |
