= School Gyrls =

American girl group

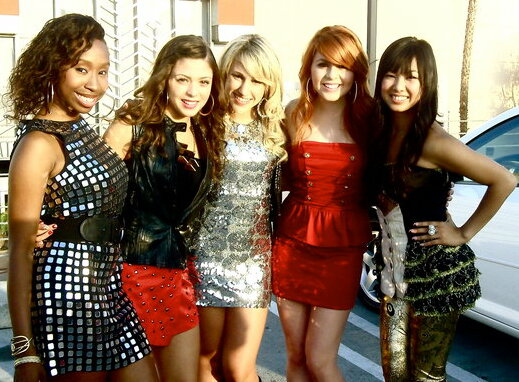
- School Gyrls in 2010. Left to right: Sade Austin, Jacque Pyles, Mandy Rain, Lauren Chavez and Monica Parales.

Background information
- Also known as: Forever (2012)
- Origin: Los Angeles, California, United States
- Genres: Pop; teen-pop
- Years active: 2009–2012
- Labels: Teen Island; N'Credible
- Past members: Mandy Rain; Monica Parales; Jacque Pyles; Sade Austin; Lauren Chavez; Natalie Aguero; Brittany Oaks; Rae Bello

The School Gyrls (briefly known as Forever) were an American girl group that debuted in 2009. They were signed to Nick Cannon's NCredible Entertainment. The group starred in an eponymous movie that premiered on Nickelodeon on February 21, 2010. The group's self-titled debut album was released on March 23, 2010. The album peaked at number 118 on the Billboard 200 albums chart, and was preceded by the singles "Something Like a Party" and "Get Like Me". Later that year, the group released another movie called "A Very School Gyrls Holla-Day", which coincided with the release of the album of the same name. Shortly after this, two of the group's original members Mandy Rain and Jacque Pyles, decided to leave to pursue solo careers. They were replaced by Brittany Oaks and Natalie Aguero.

After all the line up changes, the group decided to change their name to Forever (stylized in all uppercase) to reflect members' more mature appearance. Following the name change, remaining members Rae Bello, Sade Austin, and Monica Parales left as well, and the group disbanded.

== History ==
=== 2008–10: Formation and School Gyrls ===
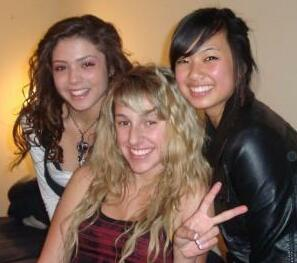
The original line up of the School Gyrls.

Nick Cannon was first introduced to Mandy Rain on the set of his reality show Star Camp, where she was the youngest member of the Star Camp group "The Giggle Club". After Star Camp wrapped, Cannon decided to use her as the nucleus of a girl group; he also formulated a movie concept about three private school girls who meet in detention. This was based on the song "Detention", a song Rain had already recorded which later appeared on their debut album.

Cannon brought in Monica Anne Parales, who had auditioned for "The Giggle Club", but she wound up working on the "Jam-X Kids" project instead. Jasmine Villegas was the original third member of the group, but left shortly after joining and was replaced by Jacque Rae Pyles. The School Gyrls made their television debut with Nick Cannon on the season finale of E! television series Party Monsters Cabo in January 2009.

In February 2010, the group starred in the Nickelodeon television film School Gyrls, which written and directed by Cannon. It centers around the three teen girls and their lives in high school, and features cameos from Reverend Run, Vanessa Simmons, Justin Bieber, Kristinia DeBarge, Soulja Boy, Mathias Anderle, Diggy Simmons, Angie Stone and others. The group's first self-titled album was released under the Island Def Jam imprint the following month. They opened for Korean-pop acts the Wonder Girls and 2PM at the House of Blues in West Hollywood, California, on June 11, 2010.

On December 4, 2010, the group's second television film A Very School Gyrls Holla-Day premiered on Nickelodeon. The film introduced two new members to the group, (then) 15-year-old Sade Austin, and 18-year-old Lauren Chavez. Their second studio album A Very School Gyrls Holla Day coincided with the release of the film.

=== 2011–12: Line-up and name changes, Wonder Girls movie, and disbandment ===
Shortly after the second movie release, Mandy Rain and Jacque Pyles decided to leave the School Gyrls to pursue solo careers. In 2011, Natalie Aguero and Brittany Oaks were added to the group to replace them. The group's first appearance with the two new members was at Kids Choice Awards 2011. Oaks left the group shortly after joining and was quickly replaced with Briana "Rae" Bello. The group introduced Rae on September 9, 2011, when the School Gyrls performed at Crenshaw Plaza.

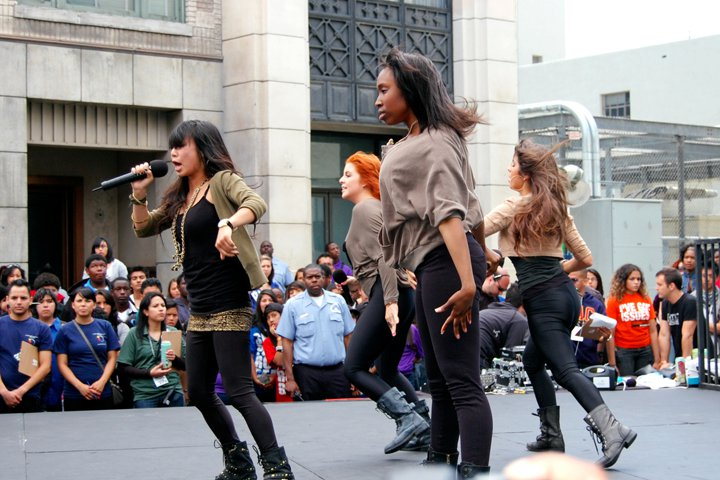
School Gyrls performing in 2011 at Paramount Studios.

In late 2011, the School Gyrls announced that they would be featured in the made-for-tv film The Wonder Girls starring the Korean pop girl group Wonder Girls. On February 2, 2012 the movie premiered on TeenNick. The School Gyrls songs "The Power Goes Out" and "We Just Got It All" were featured in the movie. The Wonder Girls released the tie-in single "The DJ is Mine" featuring the School Gyrls to promote the release. The song peaked at number 9 on the K-pop Hot 100. In late 2012, the group confirmed that their third album would be released sometime in late 2012 or 2013.

On July 20, 2012, after the group's performance at Knotts Berry Farm Amusement Park, the group's Twitter account announced that the group would be renamed Forever. Bello left the group for a solo career, leaving only four members.

On September 5, 2012, Austin announced that she too was departing from the group. Four days prior to her announcement, the group had shot their first music video as FOREVER for their single "Can't Stop This Night." Sade Austin thus appears in the song's video, which was credited as "Forever featuring Sade." On November 14, Parales announced her departure and the group disbanded permanently.

== Group members ==
=== Members ===
Final members

- Monica Parales (2009–12)
- Lauren Chavez (2010–12)
- Natalie Aguero (2011–12)

Former members

- Mandy Rain (2009–10)
- Jacque Pyles (2009–10)
- Sade Austin (2010–12)
- Rae Bello (2011–12)
- Brittany Oaks (2011)

=== Timeline ===
- Brittany Oaks is excluded from the timeline because she was only briefly part of the group.

== Discography ==
- School Gyrls (2010)
- A Very School Gyrls Holla-Day (2010)

== Filmography ==
- School Gyrls (2010)
- A Very School Gyrls Holla-Day (2010)
- The Wonder Girls (2012)
- School Gyrls Workout DVD (2012)
