= Black-ish season 3 =

Black-ish
- Season 3
- Promotional poster
- No. of episodes: 24

Release
- Original network: ABC
- Original release: September 21, 2016 – May 10, 2017

Season chronology
- ← Previous; Season 2 Next → Season 4

The third season of Black-ish aired from September 21, 2016, to May 10, 2017, on ABC in the United States. It is produced by Khalabo Ink Society, Cinema Gypsy Productions, Principato-Young Entertainment and ABC Studios, with creator Kenya Barris, who also served as executive producer alongside Anthony Anderson, Brian Dobbins, Jonathan Groff and Helen Sugland.

The series revolves around Dre, portrayed by Anthony Anderson, a family man who struggles with finding his cultural identity while raising his kids in a white neighborhood. He lives with his wife, Bow (Tracee Ellis Ross).

On May 11, 2017, ABC renewed the series for a fourth season.

This is also the last season to have Yara Shahidi as part of the main cast, due to her character departing to star in her own spin-off, Grown-ish.

== Cast ==
=== Main cast ===
- Anthony Anderson as Dre Johnson
- Tracee Ellis Ross as Bow Johnson
- Yara Shahidi as Zoey Johnson
- Marcus Scribner as Andre ("Junior") Johnson Jr.
- Miles Brown as Jack Johnson
- Marsai Martin as Diane Johnson
- Peter Mackenzie as Leslie Stevens
- Jenifer Lewis as Ruby Johnson

=== Recurring cast ===
- Laurence Fishburne as Earl "Pops" Johnson
- Jeff Meacham as Josh Oppenhol
- Deon Cole as Charlie Telphy
- Allen Maldonado as Curtis
- Nicole Sullivan as Janine
- Catherine Reitman as Lucy
- Wanda Sykes as Daphne Lido
- Daveed Diggs as Johan Johnson
- Nelson Franklin as Connor Stevens
- Lance Barber as Dr. Gabler
- Diane Farr as Rachel
- Annelise Grace as Megan

=== Guest cast ===
- Jim Rash as Cody
- Salome Azizi as Doctor Aziz
- Chris Hansen as himself
- Andrew Daly as Doctor Evan Windsor
- Kent Faulcon as Principal Green
- Lorraine Toussaint as Almaviligerais
- Beau Bridges as Paul Johnson
- Alec Mapa as Neil
- Tyra Banks as Gigi
- Mindy Sterling as Pam
- Mary Kay Place as Dr. Barris
- Gabrielle Elyse as Shelly
- Faizon Love as Sha
- Marla Gibbs as Mabel
- Ron Funches as Ledarius
- Affion Crockett as T Will
- Bill Fagerbakke as Tom Avery
- Casey Wilson as Patrice
- Regina Hall as Vivian
- Chris Brown as Richard Youngsta
- Raven-Symoné as Rhonda Johnson
- Rashida Jones as Santamonica
- Anna Deavere Smith as Alicia
- Trevor Jackson as Aaron
- Chris Parnell as Dean Parker
- Matt Walsh as President Schock
- Mallory Sparks as Miriam
- Biz Markie as himself

== Episodes ==
No. overall	No. in season	Title	Directed by	Written by	Original release date	Prod. code	U.S. viewers (millions)
49	1	"VIP"	Anton Cropper	Jonathan Groff	September 21, 2016	304	6.39
Dre takes the family to Walt Disney World and wants the kids to have the experience he never had, so he gets them a VIP tour. The kids get spoiled from bypassing lines all day and, when their VIP time is up, they get bratty when they now have to wait like everyone else. After calling them out on their ungrateful attitudes, Dre has an outburst and leaves them. Meanwhile, Bow ends up spending the day with Dre's parents since she can't ride most of the attractions due to her pregnancy.
50	2	"God"	Anton Cropper	Laura Gutin	September 28, 2016	302	5.58
Zoey questions the existence of God, so Dre and Ruby try to convince her that God is real. Bow's brother Johan (Daveed Diggs) visits. Jack and Diane aren't doing their chores and trick Bow and Junior into doing them for them.
51	3	"40 Acres and a Vote"	Ken Whittingham	Corey Nickerson	October 5, 2016	301	5.18
Junior runs for class president at his school and Dre acts as his campaign manager. Pops and Johan think that the election is rigged because their polling place location has changed and Bernie Sanders didn't win the Democratic nomination. Dre fears that people will forget Obama's achievements once he leaves office.
52	4	"Who's Afraid of the Big Black Man?"	Matt Sohn	Peter Saji	October 12, 2016	303	5.84
Bow wants to spend more time with the kids before the new baby arrives. Dre joins the Homeowner's Association as a step towards becoming more open-minded and being a part of his community.
53	5	"The Purge"	Matt Sohn	Lindsey Shockley	October 26, 2016	306	5.74
The Johnson family celebrates Halloween. When Janine suggests a neighborhood "mischief night" for the children, Ruby takes hold of the idea and begins a neighborhood-wide version of The Purge. After Junior embarrasses him, Dre sets out to teach him a lesson with a complicated prank.
54	6	"Jack of All Trades"	Linda Mendoza	Gail Lerner	November 9, 2016	305	5.27
The results of Jack's career test reveal that he may be looking at a blue-collar future. Ruby is led to believe that Diane is possessed.
55	7	"Auntsgiving"	Michael Schultz	Kenny Smith	November 16, 2016	307	5.56
Pop's sister makes a surprise stop for Thanksgiving. This angers Ruby since she hasn't liked her ever since their friendship fell apart. Dre and Bow go on a baby-moon before the baby arrives. Bow is sad that this is her last pregnancy.
56	8	"Being Bow-racial"	Kevin Bray	Jenifer Rice-Genzuk Henry	November 30, 2016	309	5.37
Bow deals with feelings about her own biracial identity when Junior brings home a white girlfriend. Dre counts on Charlie to teach him how to relate to the white point-woman for a big work presentation. Zoey wants to remodel Jack and Diane's room.
57	9	"Nothing but Nepotism"	Gail Mancuso	Yamara Taylor	December 7, 2016	310	4.22
Bow asks Dre to pull some strings to get Zoey an internship, but he doesn't want Zoey relying on nepotism. Junior secures a job at the local arcade pizza place, but gets it shut down by reporting unclean practices to corporate.
58	10	"Just Christmas, Baby"	John Fortenberry	Steven White	December 14, 2016	311	5.46
The Johnsons celebrate Christmas and get a visit from Dre's friend Gigi (Tyra Banks) and her baby. She and Bow compare their differences on raising a child. Gigi prefers to rely on technology and mommy blogs instead of motherly instincts like Bow does. Bow has to take care of the baby when Gigi and her husband are called away to perform at a charity concert, but it turns out they just went to a hotel to get some rest. Junior comes up with "Bear in the Chair" in an effort to police the twins' behavior. Ruby is shocked to discover that quite a few Christmas songs were written by Jewish songwriters. The Christmas tree catches on fire when some of the lights blow and ignite Zoey's paper childhood ornaments.
59	11	"Their Eyes Were Watching Screens"	Linda Mendoza	Gail Lerner	January 4, 2017	312	5.79
After having a conversation with some friends at school about sex, Diane is curious. She stumbles across an adult video, but Bow catches her as it begins. Dre and Bow sneak around to see what their kids' internet habits are. To keep their kids from being corrupted by the internet, they try to confiscate all their devices, even Ruby's. Eventually, the kids give their reasons on why the internet can be a good source of information. Dre and Bow give them back their devices, make dinner time a no-phone zone, and try to think of ways to use technology during family time.
60	12	"Lemons"	Kenya Barris	Kenya Barris	January 11, 2017	315	5.68
Two months after the 2016 presidential election, the Johnsons are still sad that Donald Trump won. No one at Dre's work is happy, either, and they have a fit when Lucy admits that she voted for Trump. After much discussion, Dre suggests that it's time for the entire nation to come together.
61	13	"Good Dre Hunting"	Millicent Shelton	Vijal Patel	January 18, 2017	308	4.60
Bow convinces a begrudging Dre to try therapy, and he learns how to cope with his anger issues. Meanwhile, Johan becomes a life coach to the kids.
62	14	"The Name Game"	Gail Lerner	Courtney Lilly	February 8, 2017	314	5.31
Dre and Bow have a gender reveal party, and Dre is thrilled because it's his turn to name the baby. He decides on a culturally significant name that Bow and Ruby aren't a fan of. Meanwhile, Zoey’s plan to have an anti-Valentine’s Day with her friend Shelly is thwarted when Junior asks Shelly out on a date, so Diane tries to fill in as Zoey’s BFF.
63	15	"I'm a Survivor"	Ken Whittingham	Hale Rothstein	February 15, 2017	313	5.27
When Dre goes back to Compton for a funeral, he is reunited with his old crew and struggles with survivor’s remorse for the friends he left behind. Meanwhile, Bow becomes self-conscious when Ruby criticizes her parenting style.
64	16	"One Angry Man"	John Fortenberry	Doug Hall	February 22, 2017	316	5.32
Dre is forced to participate in jury duty after Junior responds to the summons that was thrown away. The case is supposed to be open and shut, but when Dre sees that the defendant is a young African American, he feels a civic responsibility to give him a fair trial. Meanwhile, Bow decides to let the kids swear in the house since they are more open with her that way, but she and Ruby soon regret the decision.
65	17	"ToysRn’tUs"	Oz Scott	Jenifer Rice-Genzuk Henry	March 8, 2017	317	5.09
Janine gives Diane a white Girlstory doll for her birthday, and when Bow tries to return it for a black doll, she is shocked by the limited options offered. Dre blames the lack of representation of African Americans in the media, but when confronting this systematic problem, he realizes that he has prejudices of his own. Meanwhile, Ruby enlists the help of Junior to be her Spades partner.
66	18	"Manternity"	Michael Spiller	Emily Halpern & Sarah Haskins	March 15, 2017	318	4.88
Dre considers taking paternity leave after he realizes that Zoey is arguably the best child and their bond developed while he was unemployed when she was born. Meanwhile, Bow tries to hide her pregnancy in order to get a promotion, and Ruby convinces the kids that their nanny, Vivian, is stealing from them.
67	19	"Richard Youngsta"	Jude Weng	Peter Saji	March 29, 2017	319	4.93
Dre is excited about doing a campaign with a popular rap star, but becomes conflicted when Bow and Ruby provide feedback suggesting it plays on stereotypes. Meanwhile, Ruby judges Bow for letting the family eat so much take-out food but, when she tries to force the kids to eat one meal as she did as a child, her stubborn tactics come back to bite her.
68	20	"What Lies Beneath"	Beth McCarthy-Miller	Jessica Poter	April 5, 2017	321	4.58
Dre's sister Rhonda is in town and he feels a little jealous of her close relationship with Pops. Bow urges Zoey to take Junior with her to a party and things get out of hand. Meanwhile, the twins feel like they've been forgotten and decide to live life to the fullest.
69	21	"Sister, Sister"	Anya Adams	Yamara Taylor	April 26, 2017	324	4.42
Bow’s sister comes to town after filming a stint on a reality show and they couldn't have less in common. Meanwhile, Zoey suggests that Dre spend more time with Junior since she's leaving for college and Jack and Diane decide to rebrand themselves.
70	22	"All Groan Up"	Kenny Smith	Hale Rothstein	April 26, 2017	322	4.22
When Zoey gets into several colleges around the country, Dre and Bow begin to feel worried and sentimental. They reflect back on memories they've had with the family and wonder what life will be like without her around all the time. Pops tells the twins to try and sway Zoey into going to college in a city they want to visit.
71	23	"Liberal Arts"	James Griffiths	Kenya Barris & Larry Wilmore	May 3, 2017	323	4.17
Dre drops Zoey off at college for her two-day orientation, where she hits it off with a fellow freshman after they ditch the campus tour and meet a guy at the Black Student Union booth; Zoey finds out Dre never turned in her housing application, so she pays a visit to the president and dean to plead for mercy. Note: This episode served as a backdoor pilot for the first spinoff series Grown-ish. Absent: Marcus Scribner as Andre Johnson Jr., Miles Brown as Jack Johnson, Marsai Martin as Diane Johnson
72	24	"Sprinkles"	Eva Longoria	Laura Gurtin	May 10, 2017	320	4.75
In the Season 3 finale, Dre is prepping Bow's baby shower and wants it to be unforgettable, but his plans are put on hold when Bow stops by the OB/GYN due to a headache and discovers she is having complications.

== Reception ==
=== Ratings ===
Viewership and ratings per episode of Black-ish season 3
No.	Title	Air date	Rating/share (18–49)	Viewers (millions)	DVR (18–49)	DVR viewers (millions)	Total (18–49)	Total viewers (millions)
1	"VIP"	September 21, 2016	2.0/7	6.39	1.0	2.72	3.0	9.11
2	"God"	September 28, 2016	1.6/5	5.58	0.9	—N/a	2.5	—N/a
3	"40 Acres and a Vote"	October 5, 2016	1.5/5	5.18	0.9	—N/a	2.4	—N/a
4	"Who's Afraid of the Big Black Man?"	October 12, 2016	1.8/6	5.84	0.8	—N/a	2.6	—N/a
5	"The Purge"	October 26, 2016	1.7/5	5.74	0.9	—N/a	2.6	—N/a
6	"Jack of All Trades"	November 9, 2016	1.5/5	5.27	0.9	2.23	2.4	7.50
7	"Auntsgiving"	November 16, 2016	1.5/5	5.56	0.9	—N/a	2.4	—N/a
8	"Being Bow-racial"	November 30, 2016	1.7/6	5.37	0.9	2.26	2.6	7.63
9	"Nothing But Nepotism"	December 7, 2016	1.2/4	4.22	0.8	2.18	2.0	6.40
10	"Just Christmas, Baby"	December 14, 2016	1.6/5	5.46	0.8	2.29	2.4	7.76
11	"Their Eyes Were Watching Screens"	January 4, 2017	1.7/6	5.79	0.8	2.17	2.5	7.96
12	"Lemons"	January 11, 2017	1.7/6	5.68	1.2	2.84	2.9	8.52
13	"Good Dre Hunting"	January 18, 2017	1.4/5	4.60	1.0	2.35	2.4	6.96
14	"The Name Game"	February 8, 2017	1.5/5	5.31	TBD	TBD	TBD	TBD
15	"I'm a Survivor"	February 15, 2017	1.5/5	5.27	TBD	TBD	TBD	TBD
16	"One Angry Man"	February 22, 2017	1.6/6	5.32	TBD	TBD	TBD	TBD
17	"ToysRn’tUs"	March 8, 2017	1.4/5	5.09	TBD	TBD	TBD	TBD
18	"Manternity"	March 15, 2017	1.5/5	4.88	TBD	TBD	TBD	TBD
19	"Richard Youngsta"	March 29, 2017	1.5/6	4.93	TBD	TBD	TBD	TBD
20	"What Lies Beneath"	April 5, 2017	1.3/5	4.58	TBD	TBD	TBD	TBD
21	"Sister, Sister"	April 26, 2017	1.2/5	4.42	TBD	TBD	TBD	TBD
22	"All Groan Up"	April 26, 2017	1.3/5	4.22	TBD	TBD	TBD	TBD
23	"Liberal Arts"	May 3, 2017	1.2/4	4.17	TBD	TBD	TBD	TBD
24	"Sprinkles"	May 10, 2017	1.3/5	4.75	TBD	TBD	TBD	TBD
