= List of Black-ish episodes =

Black-ish is an American television sitcom broadcast on ABC created by Kenya Barris. The single-camera comedy centers on an upper-middle-class African-American family and premiered on September 24, 2014. On May 2, 2019, ABC renewed the series for a sixth season. On May 21, 2020, ABC renewed the series for a seventh season. On May 17, 2021, ABC renewed the series for an eighth and final season.During the course of the series, 176 episodes of Black-ish aired, concluding on April 19, 2022.

== Series overview ==
Series overview
Season	Episodes	Originally released	
Season	Episodes	First released	Last released
1	24	September 24, 2014	May 20, 2015
2	24	September 23, 2015	May 18, 2016
3	24	September 21, 2016	May 10, 2017
4	24 (Note: Twenty-four episodes were produced for season 4, but the thirteenth produced episode (titled "Please, Baby, Please") was shelved by ABC due to its controversial content, hence only 23 episodes were aired. "Please, Baby, Please" later debuted on Hulu on August 10, 2020.)	October 3, 2017	May 15, 2018
5	23	October 16, 2018	May 21, 2019
6	23	September 24, 2019	May 5, 2020
7 (Note: A total of 21 episodes were produced for the seventh season: a two-part special episode, which aired on October 4, 2020, before the season premiere, and another nineteen contributing towards the regular season, which officially premiered on October 21, 2020.)	Special	October 4, 2020	
7	19	October 21, 2020	May 18, 2021
8	13	January 4, 2022	April 19, 2022

== Episodes ==
=== Season 1 (2014–15) ===
No. overall	No. in season	Title	Directed by	Written by	Original release date	Prod. code	U.S. viewers (millions)
1	1	"Pilot"	James Griffiths	Kenya Barris	September 24, 2014	101	11.04
2	2	"The Talk"	Rebecca Asher	Vijal Patel	October 1, 2014	103	8.29
3	3	"The Nod"	James Griffiths	Kenya Barris	October 8, 2014	104	7.93
4	4	"Crazy Mom"	James Griffiths	Gail Lerner	October 15, 2014	102	6.93
5	5	"Crime and Punishment"	Claire Scanlon	Corey Nickerson	October 22, 2014	105	7.95
6	6	"The Prank King"	Matt Sohn	Lindsey Shockley	October 29, 2014	106	7.67
7	7	"The Gift of Hunger"	Victor Nelli, Jr.	Peter Saji	November 12, 2014	108	7.78
8	8	"Oedipal Triangle"	Rebecca Asher	Vijal Patel	November 19, 2014	109	7.82
9	9	"Colored Commentary"	Ken Whittingham	Yvette Lee Bowser	December 3, 2014	110	6.82
10	10	"Black Santa/White Christmas"	Elliot Hegarty	Gail Lerner	December 10, 2014	111	7.28
11	11	"Law of Attraction"	Michael Schultz	Corey Nickerson	January 7, 2015	113	6.23
12	12	"Martin Luther Skiing Day"	Stuart McDonald	Lindsey Shockley	January 14, 2015	114	6.51
13	13	"Big Night, Big Fight"	Rebecca Asher	Vijal Patel	February 11, 2015	115	6.83
14	14	"Andre From Marseille"	Phil Traill	David Hemingson	February 18, 2015	107	6.40
15	15	"The Dozens"	Millicent Shelton	Peter Saji	February 25, 2015	116	6.63
16	16	"Parental Guidance"	Michael Schultz	Corey Nickerson	March 4, 2015	118	6.72
17	17	"30 Something"	John Fortenberry	Courtney Lilly	March 25, 2015	112	6.34
18	18	"Sex, Lies and Vasectomies"	Matt Sohn	Gail Lerner	April 1, 2015	120	7.43
19	19	"The Real World"	Victor Nelli, Jr.	Scott Weinger	April 8, 2015	117	6.09
20	20	"Switch Hitting"	Ken Whittingham	Kenya Barris	April 22, 2015	119	6.57
21	21	"The Peer-ent Trap"	Ken Whittingham	Yvette Lee Bowser	April 29, 2015	121	5.94
22	22	"Please Don't Ask, Please Don't Tell"	Victor Nelli, Jr.	Peter Saji	May 6, 2015	122	6.89
23	23	"Elephant in the Room"	Anton Cropper	Courtney Lilly	May 13, 2015	123	6.14
24	24	"Pops' Pops' Pops"	Jonathan Groff	Vijal Patel	May 20, 2015	124	5.36

=== Season 2 (2015–16) ===
No. overall	No. in season	Title	Directed by	Written by	Original release date	Prod. code	U.S. viewers (millions)
25	1	"THE Word"	Matt Sohn	Kenya Barris	September 23, 2015	202	7.30
26	2	"Rock, Paper, Scissors, Gun"	Ken Whittingham	Peter Saji	September 30, 2015	201	5.94
27	3	"Dr. Hell No"	Millicent Shelton	Gail Lerner	October 7, 2015	203	5.86
28	4	"Daddy's Day"	Michael Schultz	Vijal Patel	October 14, 2015	204	5.66
29	5	"Churched"	Victor Nelli, Jr.	Corey Nickerson	October 21, 2015	205	5.79
30	6	"Jacked o' Lantern"	Christine Gernon	Jenifer Rice-Genzuk Henry	October 28, 2015	206	6.18
31	7	"Charlie in Charge"	Matt Sohn	Lindsey Shockley	November 11, 2015	207	5.97
32	8	"Chop Shop"	John Putch	Hale Rothstein	November 18, 2015	208	6.08
33	9	"Man at Work"	Kevin Bray	Vijal Patel	December 2, 2015	210	5.45
34	10	"Stuff"	Ken Whittingham	Corey Nickerson	December 9, 2015	211	5.97
35	11	"Plus Two Isn't a Thing"	Victor Nelli, Jr.	Njeri Brown & Lisa McQuillan	January 6, 2016	212	6.29
36	12	"Old Digger"	Linda Mendoza	Steven White	January 13, 2016	209	6.06
37	13	"Keeping Up With the Johnsons"	Millicent Shelton	Courtney Lilly	January 20, 2016	213	5.72
38	14	"Sink or Swim"	Michael Schultz	Gail Lerner	February 10, 2016	214	6.02
39	15	"Twindependence"	Michael Spiller	Peter Saji	February 17, 2016	216	5.74
40	16	"Hope"	Beth McCarthy-Miller	Kenya Barris	February 24, 2016	217	6.18
41	17	"Any Given Saturday"	Gail Mancuso	Yvette Lee Bowser	March 16, 2016	218	6.12
42	18	"Black Nanny"	Anton Cropper	Lindsey Shockley	March 23, 2016	215	5.98
43	19	"The Leftovers"	Linda Mendoza	Hale Rothstein	April 6, 2016	220	5.48
44	20	"Johnson & Johnson"	Rob Hardy	Courtney Lilly	April 13, 2016	219	5.67
45	21	"The Johnson Show"	Gail Lerner	Corey Nickerson	April 27, 2016	221	4.97
46	22	"Super Rich Kids"	Anton Cropper	Damilare Sonoiki	May 4, 2016	224	5.59
47	23	"Daddy Dre-Care"	Kenya Barris	Jonathan Groff	May 11, 2016	223	5.29
48	24	"Good-ish Times"	Anton Cropper	Jenifer Rice-Genzuk Henry	May 18, 2016	222	5.05

=== Season 3 (2016–17) ===
No. overall	No. in season	Title	Directed by	Written by	Original release date	Prod. code	U.S. viewers (millions)
49	1	"VIP"	Anton Cropper	Jonathan Groff	September 21, 2016	304	6.39
50	2	"God"	Anton Cropper	Laura Gutin	September 28, 2016	302	5.58
51	3	"40 Acres and a Vote"	Ken Whittingham	Corey Nickerson	October 5, 2016	301	5.18
52	4	"Who's Afraid of the Big Black Man?"	Matt Sohn	Peter Saji	October 12, 2016	303	5.84
53	5	"The Purge"	Matt Sohn	Lindsey Shockley	October 26, 2016	306	5.74
54	6	"Jack of All Trades"	Linda Mendoza	Gail Lerner	November 9, 2016	305	5.27
55	7	"Auntsgiving"	Michael Schultz	Kenny Smith	November 16, 2016	307	5.56
56	8	"Being Bow-racial"	Kevin Bray	Jenifer Rice-Genzuk Henry	November 30, 2016	309	5.37
57	9	"Nothing but Nepotism"	Gail Mancuso	Yamara Taylor	December 7, 2016	310	4.22
58	10	"Just Christmas, Baby"	John Fortenberry	Steven White	December 14, 2016	311	5.46
59	11	"Their Eyes Were Watching Screens"	Linda Mendoza	Gail Lerner	January 4, 2017	312	5.79
60	12	"Lemons"	Kenya Barris	Kenya Barris	January 11, 2017	315	5.68
61	13	"Good Dre Hunting"	Millicent Shelton	Vijal Patel	January 18, 2017	308	4.60
62	14	"The Name Game"	Gail Lerner	Courtney Lilly	February 8, 2017	314	5.31
63	15	"I'm a Survivor"	Ken Whittingham	Hale Rothstein	February 15, 2017	313	5.27
64	16	"One Angry Man"	John Fortenberry	Doug Hall	February 22, 2017	316	5.32
65	17	"ToysRn’tUs"	Oz Scott	Jenifer Rice-Genzuk Henry	March 8, 2017	317	5.09
66	18	"Manternity"	Michael Spiller	Emily Halpern & Sarah Haskins	March 15, 2017	318	4.88
67	19	"Richard Youngsta"	Jude Weng	Peter Saji	March 29, 2017	319	4.93
68	20	"What Lies Beneath"	Beth McCarthy-Miller	Jessica Poter	April 5, 2017	321	4.58
69	21	"Sister, Sister"	Anya Adams	Yamara Taylor	April 26, 2017	324	4.42
70	22	"All Groan Up"	Kenny Smith	Hale Rothstein	April 26, 2017	322	4.22
71	23	"Liberal Arts"	James Griffiths	Kenya Barris & Larry Wilmore	May 3, 2017	323	4.17
72	24	"Sprinkles"	Eva Longoria	Laura Gurtin	May 10, 2017	320	4.75

=== Season 4 (2017–18) ===
No. overall	No. in season	Title	Directed by	Written by	Original release date	Prod. code	U.S. viewers (millions)
73	1	"Juneteenth"	Anton Cropper	Peter Saji	October 3, 2017	401	4.71
74	2	"Mother Nature"	Ken Whittingham	Corey Nickerson	October 10, 2017	402	4.43
75	3	"Elder Scam"	Anton Cropper	Courtney Lilly	October 17, 2017	404	4.13
76	4	"Advance to Go (Collect $200)"	Anton Cropper	Gail Lerner	October 24, 2017	406	3.98
77	5	"Public Fool"	Kevin Bray	Kenya Barris	October 31, 2017	403	3.53
78	6	"First and Last"	Linda Mendoza	Laura Gutin Peterson	November 7, 2017	405	3.70
79	7	"Please Don't Feed the Animals"	Michael Schultz	Hale Rothstein	November 14, 2017	407	3.86
80	8	"Charity Case"	Claire Scanlon	Sam Laybourne	December 5, 2017	409	4.04
81	9	"Sugar Daddy"	John Fortenberry	Yamara Taylor	December 12, 2017	410	4.29
82	10	"Working Girl"	Michael Spiller	Lindsey Shockley	January 2, 2018	408	4.02
83	11	"Inheritance"	Millicent Shelton	Stacy Traub	January 9, 2018	411	3.75
84	12	"Bow Knows"	Rob Sweeney	Laura Gutin Peterson	January 16, 2018	414	3.76
85	13	"Unkept Woman"	Pete Chatmon	Christian Lander	February 6, 2018	412	3.72
86	14	"R-E-S-P-E-C-T"	Gail Lerner	Steven White	March 13, 2018	416	3.01
87	15	"White Breakfast"	Rob Cohen	Lindsey Shockley	March 13, 2018	415	2.86
88	16	"Things Were Different Then"	Todd Holland	Courtney Lilly	March 20, 2018	417	3.90
89	17	"North Star"	Eva Longoria	Laura Gutin Peterson	March 27, 2018	418	8.58
90	18	"Black Math"	Kevin Bray	Doug Hall	April 3, 2018	419	5.27
91	19	"Dog Eat Dog World"	Anton Cropper	Jenifer Rice-Genzuk Henry	April 10, 2018	420	4.90
92	20	"Fifty-Three Percent"	Tracee Ellis Ross	Gail Lerner	April 17, 2018	421	4.04
93	21	"Blue Valentine"	Jonathan Groff	Yamara Taylor	May 1, 2018	422	4.45
94	22	"Collateral Damage"	Gail Lerner	Owen H.M. Smith	May 8, 2018	423	4.32
95	23	"Dream Home"	E. Langston Craig	Graham Towers & Steve Vitolo	May 15, 2018	424	4.96
96	24	"Please, Baby, Please"	Kenya Barris	Kenya Barris & Peter Saji	August 10, 2020 (Hulu)	413	–

=== Season 5 (2018–19) ===
No. overall	No. in season	Title	Directed by	Written by	Original release date	Prod. code	U.S. viewers (millions)
97	1	"Gap Year"	Gail Lerner	Doug Hall	October 16, 2018	501	4.10
98	2	"Don't You Be My Neighbor"	Pete Chatmon	Kenny Smith	October 23, 2018	502	3.72
99	3	"Scarred for Life"	Linda Mendoza	Yamara Taylor	October 30, 2018	505	4.22
100	4	"Purple Rain"	Charles Stone III	Peter Saji	November 13, 2018	503	4.04
101	5	"Good Grief"	Todd Holland	Gail Lerner	November 20, 2018	504	3.48
102	6	"Stand Up, Fall Down"	Ryan Case	Laura Gutin Peterson	November 27, 2018	508	3.53
103	7	"Friends Without Benefits"	Ken Whittingham	Lindsey Shockley	December 4, 2018	506	3.54
104	8	"Christmas in Theater Eight"	Jude Weng	Courtney Lilly	December 11, 2018	507	3.60
105	9	"Wilds of Valley Glen"	Claire Scanlon	Christian Lander	January 8, 2019	509	3.43
106	10	"Black Like Us"	Salli Richardson-Whitfield	Peter Saji	January 15, 2019	511	3.32
107	11	"Waltz in A Minor"	Pete Chatmon	Teleplay by : Robb Chavis; Story by : Lisa Muse Bryant	January 22, 2019	510	3.36
108	12	"Dreamgirls and Boys"	John Fortenberry	Gail Lerner	February 12, 2019	512	3.11
109	13	"Son of a Pitch"	Eva Longoria	Steven White	February 19, 2019	513	2.88
110	14	"Black History Month"	Tracee Ellis Ross	Laura Gutin Peterson	February 26, 2019	517	3.10
111	15	"#JustakidfromCompton"	Millicent Shelton	Teleplay by : Lisa Muse Bryant; Story by : Robb Chavis	March 19, 2019	514	2.72
112	16	"Enough is Enough"	Michael Spiller	Doug Hall	March 26, 2019	515	2.75
113	17	"Each One, Teach One"	Gail Lerner	Melanie Boysaw	April 2, 2019	516	2.73
114	18	"Andre Johnson: Good Person"	Ken Whittingham	Esa Lewis	April 9, 2019	518	2.83
115	19	"Under the Influence"	Linda Mendoza	Christian Lander	April 16, 2019	519	3.49
116	20	"Good in the 'Hood"	Rob Sweeney	Courtney Lilly	April 23, 2019	520	3.17
117	21	"FriDre Night Lights"	Charles Stone III	Lindsey Shockley	April 30, 2019	522	2.84
118	22	"Is It Desert or Dessert?"	Kenny Smith	Kenny Smith	May 14, 2019	523	2.77
119	23	"Relatively Grown Man"	Anthony Anderson	Steven White	May 21, 2019	521	2.92

=== Season 6 (2019–20) ===
No. overall	No. in season	Title	Directed by	Written by	Original release date	Prod. code	U.S. viewers (millions)
120	1	"Pops the Question"	Kevin Bray	Steven White	September 26, 2019	601	3.49
121	2	"Every Day I'm Struggling"	Charles Stone III	Robb Chavis	October 3, 2019	604	3.13
122	3	"Feminisn't"	Eric Dean Seaton	Laura Gutin Peterson	October 10, 2019	603	3.05
123	4	"When I Grow Up (To Be a Man)"	Chioke Nassor	Christian Lander	October 17, 2019	605	2.56
124	5	"Mad and Boujee"	Michael Spiller	Lisa Muse Bryant	October 24, 2019	606	2.71
125	6	"Everybody Blames Raymond"	Kenny Smith	Kenny Smith	October 31, 2019	602	2.92
126	7	"Daughters for Dummies"	Charles Stone III	Melanie Boysaw	November 14, 2019	607	2.65
127	8	"O Mother Where Art Thou?"	Rob Sweeney	Nick Adams	November 19, 2019	608	2.38
128	9	"University of Dre"	Todd Biermann	Jak Knight	November 21, 2019	609	2.57
129	10	"Father Christmas"	Anthony Anderson	Mary Fitzgerald	December 12, 2019	610	3.00
130	11	"Hair Day"	Anya Adams	Marquita J. Robinson	January 9, 2020	611	3.17
131	12	"Boss Daddy"	Melissa Kosar	Isaiah Lester	January 16, 2020	612	2.43
132	13	"Kid Life Crisis"	Catherine Reitman	Steven White	January 23, 2020	613	2.22
133	14	"Adventure to Ventura"	Todd Biermann	Robb Chavis	January 30, 2020	614	2.14
134	15	"The Gauntlet"	Matthew A. Cherry	Graham Towers & Ben Deeb	February 6, 2020	615	2.37
135	16	"Friendgame"	Fred Savage	Laura Gutin Peterson	February 20, 2020	617	2.33
136	17	"You Don't Know Jack"	Kevin Bray	Lisa Muse Bryant	February 27, 2020	618	2.16
137	18	"Best Supporting Husband"	Eric Dean Seaton	Melanie Boysaw	March 19, 2020	619	2.67
138	19	"Dad Bod-y of Work"	Chris Robinson	Nick Adams	March 26, 2020	620	2.64
139	20	"A Game of Chicken"	Millicent Shelton	Mary Fitzgerald	April 9, 2020	622	2.69
140	21	"Earl, Interrupted"	Pete Chatmon	Christian Lander	April 16, 2020	616	2.23
141	22	"...Baby One More Time"	Gail Lerner	Lizzie Donaldson	April 30, 2020	623	2.53
142	23	"Love, Boat"	Todd Biermann	Marquita J. Robinson	May 7, 2020	621	2.53

=== Season 7 (2020–21) ===
No. overall	No. in season	Title	Directed by	Written by	Original release date	Prod. code	U.S. viewers (millions)
Special
143	–	"Election Special"	Matthew A. Cherry	Eric Horsted	October 4, 2020	701	2.17
144	–	"Election Special"	Matthew A. Cherry	Graham Towers & Ben Deeb	October 4, 2020	702	2.17
Season
145	1	"Hero Pizza"	Todd Biermann	Marquita J. Robinson	October 21, 2020	703	3.09
146	2	"Dre at Home Order"	Anton Cropper	Christian Lander	October 28, 2020	704	3.02
147	3	"Age Against the Machine"	Fred Savage	Esa Lewis	November 4, 2020	706	2.39
148	4	"Our Wedding Dre"	Eric Dean Seaton	Lisa Muse Bryant	November 18, 2020	705	2.39
149	5	"Babes in Boyland"	Fred Savage	Lizzie Donaldson	November 25, 2020	708	2.47
150	6	"Compton Around the Christmas Tree"	Eric Dean Seaton	Steven White	December 2, 2020	707	2.23
151	7	"Black-Out"	Gail Lerner	Robb Chavis	January 26, 2021	709	3.10
152	8	"What About Gary?"	Natalia Anderson	Edgar Momplaisir	February 2, 2021	710	2.66
153	9	"First Trap"	Chris Robinson	Melanie Boysaw	February 9, 2021	711	2.40
154	10	"High Water Mark"	Ryan Case	Keisha Ansley	February 16, 2021	713	2.69
155	11	"The Mother & Child De-Union"	Jude Weng	Eric Horsted	February 23, 2021	714	2.54
156	12	"Things Done Changed"	Kevin Bray	Isaiah Lester	March 2, 2021	712	2.23
157	13	"Jack's First Stand"	Pete Chatmon	Christian Lander	March 23, 2021	715	2.28
158	14	"100 Yards & Runnin'"	Rob Sweeney	Robb Chavis	March 30, 2021	716	2.45
159	15	"Move-In Ready"	Michael Spiller	Lisa Muse Bryant	April 6, 2021	717	1.66
160	16	"My Dinner with Andre Junior"	Princess Monique	Steven White	April 20, 2021	718	1.98
161	17	"Missions & Ambitions"	Courtney Lilly	Isaiah Lester & Melanie Boysaw	April 27, 2021	719	2.07
162	18	"Snitches Get Boundaries"	Natalia Anderson	Marquita J. Robinson	May 11, 2021	720	1.61
163	19	"Urban Legend"	Melissa Kosar	Graham Towers & Ben Deeb	May 18, 2021	721	1.70

=== Season 8 (2022) ===
No. overall	No. in season	Title	Directed by	Written by	Original release date	Prod. code	U.S. viewers (millions)
164	1	"That's What Friends Are For"	Jude Weng	Laura Gutin Peterson	January 4, 2022	811	2.75
165	2	"The Natural"	Linda Mendoza	Christian Lander	January 11, 2022	805	1.98
166	3	"Bow-Mo"	Natalia Anderson	Melanie Boysaw	January 18, 2022	802	2.05
167	4	"Hoop Dreams"	Todd Biermann	Lizzie Donaldson	January 25, 2022	809	2.14
168	5	"Ashy to Classy"	Kevin Bray	Edgar Momplaisir	February 1, 2022	801	1.97
169	6	"Mom Mentor"	Ryan Case	Esa Lewis	February 8, 2022	803	1.84
170	7	"Sneakers by the Dozen"	Toby Burge	Isaiah Lester	February 15, 2022	806	1.64
171	8	"My Work-Friend's Wedding"	Shiri Appleby	Julia Wiener	February 22, 2022	812	2.03
172	9	"And the Winner Is..."	Stacey Muhammad	Graham Towers & Ben Deeb	March 22, 2022	807	1.67
173	10	"Young, Gifted and Black"	Pete Chatmon	Keisha Ansley	March 29, 2022	804	1.82
174	11	"The (Almost) Last Dance"	Rob Sweeney	Story by : Courtney Lilly & Tracee Ellis Ross; Teleplay by : Courtney Lilly	April 5, 2022	808	1.88
175	12	"If a Black Man Cries in the Woods..."	Iona Morris	Robb Chavis	April 12, 2022	810	2.16
176	13	"Homegoing"	Anton L. Cropper	Steve White	April 19, 2022	813	2.52

== Blooper special ==
Title	Directed by	Written by	Original air date	U.S. viewers (millions)
"Bloop-ish"	Unknown	Unknown	March 11, 2015	4.59
Footage from behind the scenes include a tour of the set; previously unseen outtakes and interviews.

== Ratings ==
=== Seasons 1–4 ===
Black-ish : U.S. viewers per episode (millions)

Season	Episode number																							
Season	1	2	3	4	5	6	7	8	9	10	11	12	13	14	15	16	17	18	19	20	21	22	23	24
1	11.04	8.29	7.93	6.93	7.95	7.67	7.78	7.82	6.82	7.28	6.23	6.51	6.83	6.40	6.63	6.72	6.34	7.43	6.09	6.57	5.94	6.89	6.14	5.36
2	7.30	5.94	5.86	5.66	5.79	6.18	5.97	6.08	5.45	5.97	6.29	6.06	5.72	6.02	5.74	6.18	6.12	5.98	5.48	5.67	4.97	5.59	5.29	5.05
3	6.39	5.58	5.18	5.84	5.74	5.27	5.56	5.37	4.22	5.46	5.79	5.68	4.60	5.31	5.27	5.32	5.09	4.88	4.93	4.58	4.42	4.22	4.17	4.75
4	4.71	4.43	4.13	3.98	3.53	3.70	3.86	4.04	4.29	4.02	3.75	3.76	3.72	3.01	2.86	3.90	8.58	5.27	4.90	4.04	4.45	4.32	4.96	–

Audience measurement performed by Nielsen Media Research

=== Seasons 5–8 ===
Black-ish : U.S. viewers per episode (millions)

Season	Episode number																						
Season	1	2	3	4	5	6	7	8	9	10	11	12	13	14	15	16	17	18	19	20	21	22	23
5	4.10	3.72	4.22	4.04	3.48	3.53	3.54	3.60	3.43	3.32	3.36	3.11	2.88	3.10	2.72	2.75	2.73	2.83	3.49	3.17	2.84	2.77	2.92
6	3.49	3.13	3.05	2.56	2.71	2.92	2.65	2.38	2.57	3.00	3.17	2.43	2.22	2.14	2.37	2.33	2.16	2.67	2.64	2.69	2.23	2.53	2.53
7	2.17	2.17	3.09	3.02	2.39	2.39	2.47	2.23	3.10	2.66	2.40	2.69	2.54	2.23	2.28	2.45	1.66	1.98	2.07	1.61	1.70	–	
8	2.75	1.98	2.05	2.14	1.97	1.84	1.64	2.03	1.67	1.82	1.88	2.16	2.52	–									

Audience measurement performed by Nielsen Media Research

== See also ==
- List of Grown-ish episodes
- List of Mixed-ish episodes
