= Black-ish season 5 =

Black-ish
- Season 5
- Promotional poster
- No. of episodes: 23

Release
- Original network: ABC
- Original release: October 16, 2018 – May 21, 2019

Season chronology
- ← Previous; Season 4 Next → Season 6

The fifth season of Black-ish began airing on October 16, 2018, on ABC in the United States. It is produced by Khalabo Ink Society, Cinema Gypsy Productions, Artists First and ABC Studios, with creator Kenya Barris, who also serves as executive producer alongside Anthony Anderson, Brian Dobbins, Jonathan Groff and Helen Sugland.

The series revolves around Dre, portrayed by Anthony Anderson, a family man who struggles with finding his cultural identity while raising his kids in a white neighborhood with his wife, Bow (Tracee Ellis Ross).

== Cast ==
=== Main cast ===
- Anthony Anderson as Andre "Dre" Johnson
- Tracee Ellis Ross as Rainbow "Bow" Johnson
- Marcus Scribner as Andre ("Junior") Johnson Jr.
- Miles Brown as Jack Johnson
- Marsai Martin as Diane Johnson
- Peter Mackenzie as Leslie Stevens
- Deon Cole as Charlie Telphy
- Jenifer Lewis as Ruby Johnson

=== Recurring cast ===
- Laurence Fishburne as Earl "Pops" Johnson
- Yara Shahidi as Zoey Johnson
- Jeff Meacham as Josh Oppenhol
- Nicole Sullivan as Janine
- Wanda Sykes as Daphne Lido
- Nelson Franklin as Connor Stevens
- Allen Maldonado as Curtis
- Quvenzhané Wallis as Kyra
- Jennie Pierson as Ms. Davis
- Emerson Min as Mason
- Dara Reneé as Stunts

=== Guest cast ===
- Rob Huebel as Gary
- Anna Deavere Smith as Alicia
- Kellee Stewart as Angela Taylor
- Annelise Grace as Megan
- Kurt Fuller as Police Officer
- Andrew Daly as Dr. Evan Windsor
- Jet Jurgensmeyer as Caleb
- P.J. Byrne as Mr. Solomon
- Jessica Tuck as Dr. Cole
- Michael Strahan as June Bug
- Octavia Spencer as herself
- Brittany Daniel as Blair
- Nancy Lenehan as Barbara Piermont
- Katt Williams as Perry
- Raven-Symoné as Rhonda Johnson
- Laila Ali as herself
- Eric Nenninger as Ryan Simmons
- Michael Beasley as Al Kebble
- Quavo as himself
- Andy Richter as Hospital Patient
- Francia Raisa as Ana Torres

== Episodes ==
No. overall	No. in season	Title	Directed by	Written by	Original release date	Prod. code	U.S. viewers (millions)
97	1	"Gap Year"	Gail Lerner	Doug Hall	October 16, 2018	501	4.10
Junior realizes he can't manage all the pressures of college and decides to come home and take a gap year. Dre and Bow try to see if there's a way to get him back on track. Meanwhile Ruby thinks Diane and Jack should reconsider sharing a room.
98	2	"Don't You Be My Neighbor"	Pete Chatmon	Kenny Smith	October 23, 2018	502	3.72
When Dre's neighbors rent out their house to some unruly tenants, Dre debates whether to call the cops and risk being called a 'snitch' or just ignore the problem all together. Diane develops a new crush at school.
99	3	"Scarred for Life"	Linda Mendoza	Yamara Taylor	October 30, 2018	505	4.22
When Jack and Diane encounter problems at their middle school, Dre and Bow try to step in. Junior meets a girl at Ruby's church, but Ruby thinks he's getting too friendly for comfort.
100	4	"Purple Rain"	Charles Stone III	Peter Saji	November 13, 2018	503	4.04
Jack and Diane don't know Prince so the rest of the family come together to let the twins know what Prince meant to each of them.
101	5	"Good Grief"	Todd Holland	Gail Lerner	November 20, 2018	504	3.48
The birthday of Bow's deceased father brings grief to the Johnson household when Bow's mother Alicia pays a visit. Diane gets invited to an MMA match.
102	6	"Stand Up, Fall Down"	Ryan Case	Laura Gutin Peterson	November 27, 2018	508	3.53
Dre forces Junior to attend an internship at his job, Bow hires Ruby as Devonte's new nanny, and Jack cracks the parental controls on the TV.
103	7	"Friends Without Benefits"	Ken Whittingham	Lindsey Shockley	December 4, 2018	506	3.54
Bow makes a new friend at work. Jack and Junior start a fraternity.
104	8	"Christmas in Theater Eight"	Jude Weng	Courtney Lilly	December 11, 2018	507	3.60
The Johnson family decides to go to the movies for Christmas but is split between seeing the new super hero movie 'Commander Justice' or the Rosa Parks film 'Back of the Bus'. Junior runs into his ex-girlfriend at the movies which makes him reassess how he's spending his gap year.
105	9	"Wilds of Valley Glen"	Claire Scanlon	Christian Lander	January 8, 2019	509	3.43
Jack and Diane go camping with Dre for extra credit, but Dre has other plans for how they should spend the night. Bow gets a dubious comment from a coworker after receiving an award at work.
106	10	"Black Like Us"	Salli Richardson-Whitfield	Peter Saji	January 15, 2019	511	3.32
Jack and Diane's class photo puts Diane in bad lighting. Bow and Dre agree to confront the principal about the photo while opening deeper discussions about colorism within the household.
107	11	"Waltz in A Minor"	Pete Chatmon	Teleplay by : Robb Chavis; Story by : Lisa Muse Bryant	January 22, 2019	510	3.36
Dre's teenage cousin Kyra needs a place to stay. The Johnsons decide to take her in, but they have different approaches to helping her adjust to suburban life; Jack and Diane try to get Kyra on social media to get information about her.
108	12	"Dreamgirls and Boys"	John Fortenberry	Gail Lerner	February 12, 2019	512	3.11
Dre and Bow struggle with identity politics involving the kids; Diane's crush starts spending time with another girl; Junior's Valentine's Day date goes awry after Dre and Pops have a talk with him about chivalry.
109	13	"Son of a Pitch"	Eva Longoria	Steven White	February 19, 2019	513	2.88
Junior shakes things up at Stevens and Lido as an intern; Bow has a meeting with one of Kyra's teachers and learns that she has an aptitude for chemistry, but Kyra doesn't want to transfer to a magnet school.
110	14	"Black History Month"	Tracee Ellis Ross	Laura Gutin Peterson	February 26, 2019	517	3.10
Dre is upset that Jack and Diane are getting the same surface-level education about Black History Month that he got when he was growing up; he is asked to make a presentation at the school assembly and wants to bring black history to life.
111	15	"#JustakidfromCompton"	Millicent Shelton	Teleplay by : Lisa Muse Bryant; Story by : Robb Chavis	March 19, 2019	514	2.72
Dre and Bow want to send Kyra to Valley Glen Prep, but after the school treats them like a charity case, they are infuriated; Junior wants to get a job as Josh's assistant at Stevens and Lido.
112	16	"Enough is Enough"	Michael Spiller	Doug Hall	March 26, 2019	515	2.75
After Kyra's estranged father shows up and wants to bring Kyra home to Houston, Dre and Bow work to show him the amazing life they can provide for her; the kids go on a mission to get Kyra one last chili dog from Larry's.
113	17	"Each One, Teach One"	Gail Lerner	Melanie Boysaw	April 2, 2019	516	2.73
When Junior tells Dre that Josh is his mentor, Dre flips out. Jack and Diane show their friends a video of Bow dancing and she becomes the hot mom.
114	18	"Andre Johnson: Good Person"	Ken Whittingham	Esa Lewis	April 9, 2019	518	2.83
As they are planning Devante's birthday, Bow wants to be more mindful with all the new child-rearing rules these days, but Dre isn't having it; Jack and Diane try to change Ruby's bad habits.
115	19	"Under the Influence"	Linda Mendoza	Christian Lander	April 16, 2019	519	3.49
Jack keeps getting himself into trouble, so Dre chaperones the twins' school dance to keep an eye on him; Junior fights with his girlfriend after she thinks he spends too much time taking care of Devante.
116	20	"Good in the 'Hood"	Rob Sweeney	Courtney Lilly	April 23, 2019	520	3.17
Dre's sister Rhonda takes Jack and Diane to her part of town in a black neighborhood and claims the twins are scared of their own community; Bow becomes the "office mom" at work, and Junior tries to help her break the label.
117	21	"FriDre Night Lights"	Charles Stone III	Lindsey Shockley	April 30, 2019	522	2.84
Dre is thrilled when Jack makes the football team, but Bow is against the idea; Diane wants Junior to drive her to her first real date with Jalen, but Junior overstays his welcome.
118	22	"Is It Desert or Dessert?"	Kenny Smith	Kenny Smith	May 14, 2019	523	2.77
Dre has concerns about Jack and Diane spending the weekend with their friends' family in the desert; Pops is forced to come to terms with how he treats women after he helps set Junior up.
119	23	"Relatively Grown Man"	Anthony Anderson	Steven White	May 21, 2019	521	2.92
Junior gets an offer for his dream job working with Migos, but Dre and Bow are determined to convince him to return to college and get his degree.

On May 2, 2019, it was announced that the episode set to air May 7, 2019 titled "Becoming Bow" would be shelved until next season, given the series order of the second spin off, "Mixed-ish". The episode was to introduce a younger version of the character Bow living with her family.

== Reception ==
=== Ratings ===
Viewership and ratings per episode of Black-ish season 5
No.	Title	Air date	Rating/share (18–49)	Viewers (millions)	DVR (18–49)	DVR viewers (millions)	Total (18–49)	Total viewers (millions)
1	"Gap Year"	October 16, 2018	1.0/5	4.10	0.5	1.46	1.5	5.56
2	"Don't You Be My Neighbor"	October 23, 2018	0.9/4	3.72	0.5	1.38	1.4	5.10
3	"Scarred for Life"	October 30, 2018	1.1/5	4.22	0.5	1.37	1.6	5.59
4	"Purple Rain"	November 13, 2018	1.0/5	4.04	0.6	1.66	1.6	5.71
5	"Good Grief"	November 20, 2018	0.8/3	3.48	0.6	1.57	1.4	5.05
6	"Stand Up, Fall Down"	November 27, 2018	0.9/4	3.53	0.5	1.41	1.4	4.94
7	"Friends Without Benefits"	December 4, 2018	0.8/3	3.54	0.5	—N/a	1.3	—N/a
8	"Christmas in Theater Eight"	December 11, 2018	0.8/3	3.60	0.5	1.31	1.3	4.91
9	"Wilds of Valley Glen"	January 8, 2019	0.8/3	3.43	0.4	0.98	1.2	4.41
10	"Black Like Us"	January 15, 2019	0.8/4	3.32	0.5	1.47	1.3	4.79
11	"Waltz in A Minor"	January 22, 2019	0.8/4	3.36	0.4	—N/a	1.2	—N/a
12	"Dreamgirls and Boys"	February 12, 2019	0.8/3	3.11	0.5	—N/a	1.3	—N/a
13	"Son of a Pitch"	February 19, 2019	0.7/3	2.88	0.5	1.35	1.2	4.23
14	"Black History Month"	February 26, 2019	0.8/4	3.10	0.4	1.15	1.2	4.25
15	"#JustakidfromCompton"	March 19, 2019	0.6/3	2.72	0.4	1.10	1.0	3.82
16	"Enough is Enough"	March 26, 2019	0.6/3	2.75	0.4	1.07	1.0	3.82
17	"Each One, Teach One"	April 2, 2019	0.7/3	2.73	0.4	1.02	1.1	3.75
18	"Andre Johnson: Good Person"	April 9, 2019	0.7/3	2.83	0.3	1.04	1.0	3.87
19	"Under the Influence"	April 16, 2019	0.8/4	3.49	0.4	—N/a	1.2	—N/a
20	"Good in the ‘Hood"	April 23, 2019	0.7/3	3.17	0.3	0.94	1.0	4.11
21	"FriDre Night Lights"	April 30, 2019	0.7/3	2.84	TBD	TBD	TBD	TBD
22	"Is It Desert or Dessert"	May 14, 2019	0.6/3	2.77	0.4	1.10	1.0	3.87
23	"Relatively Grown Man"	May 21, 2019	0.7/3	2.92	0.5	1.18	1.2	4.10
