= Black-ish season 4 =

Black-ish
- Season 4
- Promotional poster
- No. of episodes: 24

Release
- Original network: ABC (episodes 1–23); Hulu (episode 24)
- Original release: October 3, 2017 – May 15, 2018

Season chronology
- ← Previous; Season 3 Next → Season 5

The fourth season of Black-ish aired from October 3, 2017, to May 15, 2018, on ABC in the United States. It is produced by Khalabo Ink Society, Cinema Gypsy Productions, Principato-Young Entertainment and ABC Studios, with creator Kenya Barris, who also serves as executive producer alongside Anthony Anderson, Brian Dobbins, Jonathan Groff and Helen Sugland.

The series revolves around Dre, portrayed by Anthony Anderson, a family man who struggles with finding his cultural identity while raising his kids in a white neighborhood. He lives with his wife, Bow (Tracee Ellis Ross).

From this season forward, Yara Shahidi is a recurring character, due to her character receiving her own spin-off show, Grown-ish.

== Cast ==
=== Main cast ===
- Anthony Anderson as Dre Johnson
- Tracee Ellis Ross as Bow Johnson
- Marcus Scribner as Andre ("Junior") Johnson Jr.
- Miles Brown as Jack Johnson
- Marsai Martin as Diane Johnson
- Peter Mackenzie as Leslie Stevens
- Deon Cole as Charlie Telphy
- Jenifer Lewis as Ruby Johnson

=== Recurring cast ===
- Laurence Fishburne as Earl "Pops" Johnson
- Yara Shahidi as Zoey Johnson
- Jeff Meacham as Josh Oppenhol
- Nicole Sullivan as Janine
- Wanda Sykes as Daphne Lido
- Nelson Franklin as Connor Stevens
- Allen Maldonado as Curtis
- Catherine Reitman as Lucy
- Jennie Pierson as Ms. Davis
- Emerson Min as Mason

=== Guest cast ===
- Aloe Blacc as himself
- Fonzworth Bentley as himself
- Trevor Jackson as Aaron
- Annelise Grace as Megan
- Anna Deavere Smith as Alicia
- Rick Fox as himself
- Paul F. Tompkins as Dr. Reagan
- Andrew Daly as Dr. Evan Windsor
- Rashida Jones as Santamonica
- Raven-Symoné as Rhonda Johnson
- Brittany Daniel as Blair
- Amy Hill as Nana Jean
- Amanda Seales as Barbara
- Cedric the Entertainer as Smokey
- Beau Bridges as Paul
- Marla Gibbs as Mabel
- Leslie Grossman as Gwen
- Rob Huebel as Gary
- Ted Allen as himself
- Daveed Diggs as Johan
- Dana Powell as Marla
- Suzy Nakamura as Dr. Ima

== Episodes ==
No. overall	No. in season	Title	Directed by	Written by	Original release date	Prod. code	U.S. viewers (millions)
73	1	"Juneteenth"	Anton Cropper	Peter Saji	October 3, 2017	401	4.71
The Johnsons go to Jack and Diane's school play about Columbus Day and Dre is dismayed by the historically inaccurate way that the holiday is portrayed. He feels like there aren't enough black holidays, so he enlists Aloe Blacc at work to help him create a catchy song to raise awareness for a holiday worth celebrating: Juneteenth.
74	2	"Mother Nature"	Ken Whittingham	Corey Nickerson	October 10, 2017	402	4.43
Bow feels overwhelmed after Devante's birth and learns that she is suffering from postpartum depression. Dre urges her to get help and stands by her side while she works through it. Meanwhile, the kids try to help their parents by baby-proofing the house.
75	3	"Elder Scam"	Anton Cropper	Courtney Lilly	October 17, 2017	404	4.13
When Ruby gets scammed, Dre suspects that she isn't as sharp as she used to be, particularly because she was the one who used to scam others. Elsewhere, Diane develops a crush on Zoey's friend Aaron.
76	4	"Advance to Go (Collect $200)"	Anton Cropper	Gail Lerner	October 24, 2017	406	3.98
Dre brings everyone together for a rowdy family game night and the competition is fierce. The game of choice is Monopoly, and as the night progresses, alliances are formed and some are pushed to their limits. Meanwhile, Bow makes clear how she feels about Junior's girlfriend.
77	5	"Public Fool"	Kevin Bray	Kenya Barris	October 31, 2017	403	3.53
An incident at school gets Junior expelled from his beloved Valley Glen Prep. Faced with sending their son to public school, Bow and Dre worry over how he will fare in his new environment.
78	6	"First and Last"	Linda Mendoza	Laura Gutin Peterson	November 7, 2017	405	3.70
Diane experiences a big life event; sensing his dominance on the court coming to an end, Dre conducts psychological warfare on Junior before challenging him to a game of basketball.
79	7	"Please Don't Feed the Animals"	Michael Schultz	Hale Rothstein	November 14, 2017	407	3.86
Dre's godbrother is released from prison, sparking a debate between Dre and Bow; the kids pressure Ruby to reveal secrets from her past.
80	8	"Charity Case"	Claire Scanlon	Sam Laybourne	December 5, 2017	409	4.04
Dre is chosen to lead Stevens and Lido's new charity campaign, which helps people give back to their community. When Bow advises Dre that there is more to giving back than cutting checks, he decides to donate some of his clothes to a man in need. The man's striking resemblance to Dre results in people thinking he has become homeless himself. Meanwhile, Junior fails his driving test, so Ruby offers to chaperone him and the twins on an informative outing.
81	9	"Sugar Daddy"	John Fortenberry	Yamara Taylor	December 12, 2017	410	4.29
Dre is diagnosed with Type 2 diabetes and resolves to cure himself; Jack is convinced that baby Devante hates him and enlists the help of Junior and Diane in his attempts to win him over.
82	10	"Working Girl"	Michael Spiller	Lindsey Shockley	January 2, 2018	408	4.02
Bow struggles to adjust when she returns to work after maternity leave; Ruby teaches the twins a way to manipulate teachers in order to get out of doing homework.
83	11	"Inheritance"	Millicent Shelton	Stacy Traub	January 9, 2018	411	3.75
Ruby has a talk with Dre and Rhonda (guest star Raven-Symoné) about their inheritance; Bow's sister hires Junior as her assistant.
84	12	"Bow Knows"	Rob Sweeney	Laura Gutin Peterson	January 16, 2018	414	3.76
Dre runs point on a campaign focusing on the talk black parents have with their children about racial bias; Bow finds an online support group for moms.
85	13	"Unkept Woman"	Pete Chatmon	Christian Lander	February 6, 2018	412	3.72
Dre and Bow's morning routine with the kids changes; Junior bonds with Diane over teasing Jack's friend Mason now that he is in charge of driving his siblings to school.
86	14	"R-E-S-P-E-C-T"	Gail Lerner	Steven White	March 13, 2018	416	3.01
Dre and Bow face their own gender biases upon learning that Junior and Zoey have both become sexually active. Ruby's feelings are hurt when she realizes Jack and Diane are spending time with a classmate's grandmother after school.
87	15	"White Breakfast"	Rob Cohen	Lindsey Shockley	March 13, 2018	415	2.86
Dre and Bow try to figure out the right balance of discipline and support when Jack and Diane get in trouble at school. Ruby believes Junior's Spanish teacher might be coming on to him.
88	16	"Things Were Different Then"	Todd Holland	Courtney Lilly	March 20, 2018	417	3.90
Dre sees his father's past in a new light when he and Junior plan Pops' 65th birthday party; Jack and Diane take advantage of Bow's decision to say yes to everything for a whole year.
89	17	"North Star"	Eva Longoria	Laura Gutin Peterson	March 27, 2018	418	8.58
Dre and Bow learn to love each other's cuisines when their families arrive for Easter; Jack and Diane pretend not to be interested in Junior's Easter egg hunt to impress their cool cousins.
90	18	"Black Math"	Kevin Bray	Doug Hall	April 3, 2018	419	5.27
When Junior is accepted into Stanford, Andre tries to convince him to attend Howard University instead. Jack develops a comedy style and Ruby decides to manage his career, forcing Diane to compete for her attention.
91	19	"Dog Eat Dog World"	Anton Cropper	Jenifer Rice-Genzuk Henry	April 10, 2018	420	4.90
The family is divided over the idea of getting a dog after Dre and Bow promise Jack he can get one if he gets straight A's -- and he does. Meanwhile, Bow's brother Johan (guest star Daveed Diggs) is in town and doesn't get the warm welcome he expects from Ruby.
92	20	"Fifty-Three Percent"	Tracee Ellis Ross	Gail Lerner	April 17, 2018	421	4.04
Fighting more than usual, Dre and Bow return to their therapist, who suggests they schedule a date night; when a bounce house gets left behind after Devante's first birthday party, Jack and Diane take advantage of it in different ways.
93	21	"Blue Valentine"	Jonathan Groff	Yamara Taylor	May 1, 2018	422	4.45
Tensions are high between Dre and Bow as their contractor arrives to remodel the kitchen; Dre reflects on the good times in his relationship with Bow.
94	22	"Collateral Damage"	Gail Lerner	Owen H.M. Smith	May 8, 2018	423	4.32
Feeling that their marriage is on the rocks, Dre and Bow separate. They maintain a civil relationship in front of the kids but, in private, their relationship remains strained. During a graduation party for Junior, Dre and Bow get into a heated argument without realizing their kids are watching, devastating the kids, who blame themselves for their parents' fighting, and diminishing their own hopes for reconciliation.
95	23	"Dream Home"	E. Langston Craig	Graham Towers & Steve Vitolo	May 15, 2018	424	4.96
Dre and Bow try to lead separate lives by splitting their time with the kids and adapting to their new realities: Dre leases his dream glass house in the Hollywood Hills, which proves to be a challenge with the kids, while Bow struggles to be the man of the house. However, a family tragedy prompts Dre and Bow to come together and reconsider their future.

=== Unaired episode ===
The would-be fourteenth episode of the season, titled "Please, Baby, Please", was shot in November 2017, and originally scheduled to air on February 27, 2018. However on February 22, 2018, ABC announced that the episode would be pulled from the schedule and that a repeat of a past episode would air instead. USA Today stated that the episode "was apparently too political for the network". An ABC spokesperson said that there "were creative differences we were unable to resolve". On March 10, 2018, it was officially announced that the network had no plans to air the episode. In the episode, Dre tries to read a bedtime story to Devante during a thunderstorm, but instead improvises a new story based on recent social and political issues in the United States. It was added to Hulu on August 10, 2020.

No. overall	No. in season	Title	Directed by	Written by	Original release date	Prod. code	U.S. viewers (millions)
96	24	"Please, Baby, Please"	Kenya Barris	Kenya Barris & Peter Saji	August 10, 2020 (Hulu)	413	–
Devante keeps everyone awake on a stormy night with his crying, so Dre is given the task of calming him down with a bedtime story, but when that doesn't work, he tells his own story about the current state of the country.

== Reception ==
=== Ratings ===
Viewership and ratings per episode of Black-ish season 4
No.	Title	Air date	Rating/share (18–49)	Viewers (millions)	DVR (18–49)	Total (18–49)
1	"Juneteenth"	October 3, 2017	1.5/5	4.71	0.7	2.2
2	"Mother Nature"	October 10, 2017	1.3/5	4.43	0.7	2.0
3	"Elder. Scam."	October 17, 2017	1.1/4	4.13	0.8	1.9
4	"Advance to Go (Collect $200)"	October 24, 2017	1.1/4	3.98	—N/a	—N/a
5	"Public Fool"	October 31, 2017	1.0/4	3.53	—N/a	—N/a
6	"First and Last"	November 7, 2017	1.1/4	3.70	0.7	1.8
7	"Please Don't Feed the Animals"	November 14, 2017	1.1/4	3.86	—N/a	—N/a
8	"Charity Case"	December 5, 2017	1.0/4	4.04	0.7	1.7
9	"Sugar Daddy"	December 12, 2017	1.2/5	4.29	—N/a	—N/a
10	"Working Girl"	January 2, 2018	1.1/4	4.02	—N/a	—N/a
11	"Inheritance"	January 9, 2018	1.0/4	3.75	—N/a	—N/a
12	"Bow Knows"	January 16, 2018	1.0/4	3.76	—N/a	—N/a
13	"Unkept Woman"	February 6, 2018	1.0/4	3.72	0.6	1.6
14	"R-E-S-P-E-C-T"	March 13, 2018	0.9/3	3.01	TBD	TBD
15	"White Breakfast"	March 13, 2018	0.9/3	2.86	TBD	TBD
16	"Things Were Different Then"	March 20, 2018	1.1/4	3.90	TBD	TBD
17	"North Star"	March 27, 2018	2.6/10	8.58	TBD	TBD
18	"Black Math"	April 3, 2018	1.5/6	5.27	TBD	TBD
19	"Dog Eat Dog World"	April 10, 2018	1.3/5	4.90	0.6	1.9
20	"Fifty-Three Percent"	April 17, 2018	1.1/4	4.04	TBD	TBD
21	"Blue Valentime"	May 1, 2018	1.2/5	4.45	TBD	TBD
22	"Collateral Damage"	May 8, 2018	1.2/5	4.32	TBD	TBD
23	"Dream Home"	May 15, 2018	1.2/5	4.96	TBD	TBD
