= Black-ish season 7 =

Season of television series

Black-ish
- Season 7
- No. of episodes: 21

Release
- Original network: ABC
- Original release: October 21, 2020 – May 18, 2021

Season chronology
- ← Previous; Season 6 Next → Season 8

The seventh season of Black-ish premiered on October 21, 2020 and concluded on May 18, 2021. It is produced by Khalabo Ink Society, Cinema Gypsy Productions, Artists First and ABC Signature, with creator Kenya Barris, who also serves as executive producer alongside Anthony Anderson, Brian Dobbins, Jonathan Groff and Helen Sugland.

The series revolves around Dre, portrayed by Anthony Anderson, a family man who struggles with finding his cultural identity while raising his kids in a white neighborhood with his wife, Bow (Tracee Ellis Ross).

== Cast ==
=== Main cast ===
- Anthony Anderson as Andre "Dre" Johnson
- Tracee Ellis Ross as Rainbow "Bow" Johnson
- Marcus Scribner as Andre ("Junior") Johnson Jr.
- Miles Brown as Jack Johnson
- Marsai Martin as Diane Johnson
- Peter Mackenzie as Leslie Stevens
- Deon Cole as Charlie Telphy
- Jenifer Lewis as Ruby Johnson
- Jeff Meacham as Josh Oppenhol
- Katlyn Nichol as Olivia Lockhart

=== Recurring cast ===
- Laurence Fishburne as Earl "Pops" Johnson
- Yara Shahidi as Zoey Johnson
- Nelson Franklin as Connor Stevens
- Nicole Sullivan as Janine
- Catherine Reitman as Lucy
- Emerson Min as Mason
- Liz Jenkins as Ms. Biggs

=== Guest cast ===
- Judy Reyes as Dr. Paul
- Parminder Nagra as Dr. Smith
- Danny Glover as Uncle Norman
- Christina Anthony as Denise
- Ron Funches as Ladarius
- Affion Crockett as T Will
- Chris Spencer as Ronnie
- Henry Dittman as Wayne
- Rob Huebel as Gary
- Andrew Daly as Dr. Evan Windsor
- Nathan Morris as himself
- Shawn Stockman as himself
- Wanya Morris as himself

== Episodes ==
No. overall	No. in season	Title	Directed by	Written by	Original release date	Prod. code	U.S. viewers (millions)
Special
143	–	"Election Special"	Matthew A. Cherry	Eric Horsted	October 4, 2020	701	2.17
144	–	"Election Special"	Matthew A. Cherry	Graham Towers & Ben Deeb	October 4, 2020	702	2.17
Season
145	1	"Hero Pizza"	Todd Biermann	Marquita J. Robinson	October 21, 2020	703	3.09
146	2	"Dre at Home Order"	Anton Cropper	Christian Lander	October 28, 2020	704	3.02
147	3	"Age Against the Machine"	Fred Savage	Esa Lewis	November 4, 2020	706	2.39
148	4	"Our Wedding Dre"	Eric Dean Seaton	Lisa Muse Bryant	November 18, 2020	705	2.39
149	5	"Babes in Boyland"	Fred Savage	Lizzie Donaldson	November 25, 2020	708	2.47
150	6	"Compton Around the Christmas Tree"	Eric Dean Seaton	Steven White	December 2, 2020	707	2.23
151	7	"Black-Out"	Gail Lerner	Robb Chavis	January 26, 2021	709	3.10
152	8	"What About Gary?"	Natalia Anderson	Edgar Momplaisir	February 2, 2021	710	2.66
153	9	"First Trap"	Chris Robinson	Melanie Boysaw	February 9, 2021	711	2.40
154	10	"High Water Mark"	Ryan Case	Keisha Ansley	February 16, 2021	713	2.69
155	11	"The Mother & Child De-Union"	Jude Weng	Eric Horsted	February 23, 2021	714	2.54
156	12	"Things Done Changed"	Kevin Bray	Isaiah Lester	March 2, 2021	712	2.23
157	13	"Jack's First Stand"	Pete Chatmon	Christian Lander	March 23, 2021	715	2.28
158	14	"100 Yards & Runnin'"	Rob Sweeney	Robb Chavis	March 30, 2021	716	2.45
159	15	"Move-In Ready"	Michael Spiller	Lisa Muse Bryant	April 6, 2021	717	1.66
160	16	"My Dinner with Andre Junior"	Princess Monique	Steven White	April 20, 2021	718	1.98
161	17	"Missions & Ambitions"	Courtney Lilly	Isaiah Lester & Melanie Boysaw	April 27, 2021	719	2.07
162	18	"Snitches Get Boundaries"	Natalia Anderson	Marquita J. Robinson	May 11, 2021	720	1.61
163	19	"Urban Legend"	Melissa Kosar	Graham Towers & Ben Deeb	May 18, 2021	721	1.70

== Ratings ==
Viewership and ratings per episode of Black-ish season 7
No.	Title	Air date	Rating/share (18–49)	Viewers (millions)	DVR (18–49)	DVR viewers (millions)	Total (18–49)	Total viewers (millions)
1	"Hero Pizza"	October 21, 2020	0.6	3.09	TBD	TBD	TBD	TBD
2	"Dre at Home Order"	October 28, 2020	0.6	3.02	TBD	TBD	TBD	TBD
3	"Age Against the Machine"	November 4, 2020	0.5	2.39	TBD	TBD	TBD	TBD
4	"Our Wedding Dre"	November 18, 2020	0.4	2.39	TBD	TBD	TBD	TBD
5	"Babes in Boyland"	November 25, 2020	0.5	3.48	TBD	TBD	TBD	TBD
6	"Compton Around the Christmas Tree"	December 2, 2020	0.4	2.23	TBD	TBD	TBD	TBD
7	"Black-out"	January 26, 2021	0.6	3.10	TBD	—N/a	TBD	—N/a
8	"What About Gary?"	February 2, 2021	0.5	2.66	TBD	TBD	TBD	TBD
9	"First Trap"	February 9, 2021	0.5	2.40	TBD	TBD	TBD	TBD
10	"High Water Mark"	February 16, 2021	0.6	2.69	TBD	TBD	TBD	TBD
11	"The Mother and Child De-Union"	February 23, 2021	0.5	2.54	TBD	TBD	TBD	TBD
12	"Things Done Changed"	March 2, 2021	0.4	2.23	TBD	TBD	TBD	TBD
13	"Jack's First Stand"	March 23, 2021	0.5	2.28	TBD	TBD	TBD	TBD
14	"100 Yards and Runnin'"	March 30, 2021	0.5	2.45	TBD	TBD	TBD	TBD
15	"Move-In Ready"	April 6, 2021	0.3	1.66	TBD	TBD	TBD	TBD
16	"My Dinner with Andre Junior"	April 20, 2021	0.4	1.98	TBD	TBD	TBD	TBD
17	"Missions & Ambitions"	April 27, 2021	0.4	2.07	TBD	TBD	TBD	TBD
18	"Snitches Get Boundaries"	May 11, 2021	0.3	1.61	0.2	0.65	0.5	2.26
19	"Urban Legend"	May 18, 2021	0.4	1.70	0.1	0.62	0.5	2.32
