= Black-ish season 6 =

Black-ish
- Season 6
- No. of episodes: 23

Release
- Original network: ABC
- Original release: September 24, 2019 – May 5, 2020

Season chronology
- ← Previous; Season 5 Next → Season 7

The sixth season of Black-ish premiered on September 24, 2019 and concluded on May 5, 2020 on ABC in the United States. It is produced by Khalabo Ink Society, Cinema Gypsy Productions, Artists First and ABC Studios, with creator Kenya Barris, who also serves as executive producer alongside Anthony Anderson, Brian Dobbins, Jonathan Groff and Helen Sugland.

The series revolves around Dre, portrayed by Anthony Anderson, a family man who struggles with finding his cultural identity while raising his kids in a white neighborhood with his wife, Bow (Tracee Ellis Ross).

== Cast ==
=== Main cast ===
- Anthony Anderson as Andre "Dre" Johnson
- Tracee Ellis Ross as Rainbow "Bow" Johnson
- Marcus Scribner as Andre ("Junior") Johnson Jr.
- Miles Brown as Jack Johnson
- Marsai Martin as Diane Johnson
- Peter Mackenzie as Leslie Stevens
- Deon Cole as Charlie Telphy
- Jenifer Lewis as Ruby Johnson
- Jeff Meacham as Josh Oppenhol

=== Recurring cast ===
- Laurence Fishburne as Earl "Pops" Johnson
- Yara Shahidi as Zoey Johnson
- Nelson Franklin as Connor Stevens
- Loretta Devine as Lynette
- Nicole Sullivan as Janine
- Wanda Sykes as Daphne Lido
- Catherine Reitman as Lucy
- Emerson Min as Mason
- Jennie Pierson as Ms. Davis
- Liz Jenkins as Ms. Biggs

=== Guest cast ===
- Baron Vaughn as Doug
- Golden Brooks as Malika
- Jill Marie Jones as Tina
- Persia White as Lila
- Reggie Hayes as Walter
- LaVar Ball as himself
- Bashir Salahuddin as Harold
- Diallo Riddle as Reggie
- Christine Horn as Shaline
- Raven-Symoné as Rhonda Johnson
- Steven Williams as Phillip
- Mercedez McDowell as Nicole
- Jill Scott as Yaya
- Anthony Alabi as Lewis
- Gillian Iliana Waters as Tanya
- Joel McHale as himself
- Eric Garcetti as Mayor Eric Garcetti
- Michael Jai White as Vincent
- Keith David as Loose Craig
- Glynn Turman as Billy Blade
- Matt Braunger as Jeremy
- Shondalia White as Erica
- Chloe Bailey as Jazz Forster
- Katlyn Nichol as Olivia Lockhart

== Episodes ==
No. overall	No. in season	Title	Directed by	Written by	Original release date	Prod. code	U.S. viewers (millions)
120	1	"Pops the Question"	Kevin Bray	Steven White	September 26, 2019	601	3.49
The twins are headed into eighth grade; Junior is out on his own managing social media for Migos; Pops reveals that he is getting married.
121	2	"Every Day I'm Struggling"	Charles Stone III	Robb Chavis	October 3, 2019	604	3.13
When Rainbow and Dre realize Junior's been taking them for granted, they decide it's time to band together and cut him off for good; Jack discovers he has a very lucrative talent, but Ruby wants to use it for all the wrong reasons.
122	3	"Feminisn't"	Eric Dean Seaton	Laura Gutin Peterson	October 10, 2019	603	3.05
When Bow learns that Diane and Ruby don't believe in feminism, she brings Diane to her feminist group; Junior and Jack help Dre after he realizes he is out of touch with modern-day feminism.
123	4	"When I Grow Up (To Be a Man)"	Chioke Nassor	Christian Lander	October 17, 2019	605	2.56
Jack gets cut from the basketball team and it leads to a family discussion about him being short for his age; Dre is worried for Jack's future, but Bow feels strongly that he will overcome his adversity and be stronger for it.
124	5	"Mad and Boujee"	Michael Spiller	Lisa Muse Bryant	October 24, 2019	606	2.71
When Dre is invited to join a private social club for the black upper class, Bow and the family jump at the opportunity to mingle with this new community; Junior helps Pops pick a wedding date.
125	6	"Everybody Blames Raymond"	Kenny Smith	Kenny Smith	October 31, 2019	602	2.92
Halloween is around the corner and the Johnsons are not seeing eye to eye on the family costume; the Johnsons agree that Jack's new friend Raymond has got to go; Junior wants Devante's first trick-or-treating experience to be perfect.
126	7	"Daughters for Dummies"	Charles Stone III	Melanie Boysaw	November 14, 2019	607	2.65
When Dre realizes that his relationship with Diane has been distant, he plans some daddy-daughter bonding sessions; Bow covers for Junior at his ChoreBoar gig.
127	8	"O Mother Where Art Thou?"	Rob Sweeney	Nick Adams	November 19, 2019	608	2.38
When Dre discovers that Lynette is an art aficionado like himself, the two quickly bond and become close; Junior introduces Bow to virtual reality.
128	9	"University of Dre"	Todd Biermann	Jak Knight	November 21, 2019	609	2.57
Dre and Bow are worried about Junior's future working odd jobs, especially after he tells them he wants to produce comedy shows for unknown comics; Rainbow encourages Diane to have a slumber party at their house.
129	10	"Father Christmas"	Anthony Anderson	Mary Fitzgerald	December 12, 2019	610	3.00
Dre is thrown off when Pops shows up to the house full of holiday cheer; the whole family gets into the holiday spirit until someone from Lynette's past shows up.
130	11	"Hair Day"	Anya Adams	Marquita J. Robinson	January 9, 2020	611	3.17
Bow takes Diane to a salon and wants to spend this time together as a bonding opportunity; Diane is conflicted about relaxing her hair again and embarks on a hair journey; Dre and Junior compete to have the best barbecue.
131	12	"Boss Daddy"	Melissa Kosar	Isaiah Lester	January 16, 2020	612	2.43
Dre struggles between helping Junior or letting him make his own mistakes; Jack tries to seem cool in front of his old basketball team and loses a friend.
132	13	"Kid Life Crisis"	Catherine Reitman	Steven White	January 23, 2020	613	2.22
The Johnson family goes on a vacation to Mexico. Junior is left parenting his siblings, while Rainbow and Dre try to have couple time.
133	14	"Adventure to Ventura"	Todd Biermann	Robb Chavis	January 30, 2020	614	2.14
Diane and Jack are encouraged to explore the world outside their home by themselves. Junior tries to get a good work review.
134	15	"The Gauntlet"	Matthew A. Cherry	Graham Towers & Ben Deeb	February 6, 2020	615	2.37
Dre and Rainbow try to get each other the best presents. Jack has girlfriend problems.
135	16	"Friendgame"	Fred Savage	Laura Gutin Peterson	February 20, 2020	617	2.33
Diane loses a best friend and Rainbow tries to help. Junior and Jack fix a wall by themselves like men.
136	17	"You Don't Know Jack"	Kevin Bray	Lisa Muse Bryant	February 27, 2020	618	2.16
Jack joins Robotics Club and Dre isn't happy. Diane writes about grandma Ruby's life for school.
137	18	"Best Supporting Husband"	Eric Dean Seaton	Melanie Boysaw	March 19, 2020	619	2.67
Dre is supportive when Rainbow is elected to the prestigious Medical Council, but doesn't like it when the invitation to the fund raiser is for Dr Rainbow Johnson plus one
138	19	"Dad Bod-y of Work"	Chris Robinson	Nick Adams	March 26, 2020	620	2.64
Dre feels he should be a better dad and ends up volunteering to the school Get Back Day. Rainbow tries to convince Junior to get a flu vaccine, but faces opposition from Ruby.
139	20	"A Game of Chicken"	Millicent Shelton	Mary Fitzgerald	April 9, 2020	622	2.69
Dre and Rainbow have to manage conflict over Devante's pre-school. Junior helps Jack and Diane with their 8th grade prank.
140	21	"Earl, Interrupted"	Pete Chatmon	Christian Lander	April 16, 2020	616	2.23
Dre intervenes when Pops starts gambling and partying; Bow tries to avoid an annoying parent at the school gate.
141	22	"...Baby One More Time"	Gail Lerner	Lizzie Donaldson	April 30, 2020	623	2.53
Dre's sister, Rhonda, has some big news, which Dre isn't happy about.
142	23	"Love, Boat"	Todd Biermann	Marquita J. Robinson	May 7, 2020	621	2.53
Dre discovers something shocking about Pops and Ruby; Junior tries to rekindle a past romance.

== Ratings ==
Viewership and ratings per episode of Black-ish season 6
No.	Title	Air date	Rating/share (18–49)	Viewers (millions)	DVR (18–49)	DVR viewers (millions)	Total (18–49)	Total viewers (millions)
1	"Pops the Question"	September 24, 2019	0.9/4	3.49	—N/a	—N/a	—N/a	—N/a
2	"Every Day I'm Struggling"	October 1, 2019	0.7/4	3.13	—N/a	—N/a	—N/a	—N/a
3	"Feminisn't"	October 8, 2019	0.7/3	3.05	—N/a	—N/a	—N/a	—N/a
4	"When I Grow Up (To Be a Man)"	October 15, 2019	0.6/3	2.56	—N/a	—N/a	—N/a	—N/a
5	"Mad and Boujee"	October 22, 2019	0.7/3	2.71	TBD	TBD	TBD	TBD
6	"Everybody Blames Raymond"	October 29, 2019	0.8/4	2.92	TBD	TBD	TBD	TBD
7	"Daughters for Dummies"	November 12, 2019	0.5/3	2.65	TBD	TBD	TBD	TBD
8	"O Mother Where Art Thou?"	November 19, 2019	0.6/3	2.38	TBD	TBD	TBD	TBD
9	"University of Dre"	November 26, 2019	0.5/3	2.57	TBD	TBD	TBD	TBD
10	"Father Christmas"	December 10, 2019	0.6/3	3.00	TBD	TBD	TBD	TBD
11	"Hair Day"	January 7, 2020	0.8/4	3.17	TBD	TBD	TBD	TBD
12	"Boss Daddy"	January 14, 2020	0.5/3	2.43	TBD	TBD	TBD	TBD
13	"Kid Life Crisis"	January 21, 2020	0.5/2	2.22	TBD	TBD	TBD	TBD
14	"Adventure to Ventura"	January 28, 2020	0.5/3	2.14	TBD	TBD	TBD	TBD
15	"The Gauntlet"	February 11, 2020	0.6/3	2.37	TBD	TBD	TBD	TBD
16	"Friendgame"	February 18, 2020	0.5/2	2.33	TBD	TBD	TBD	TBD
17	"You Don't Know Jack"	February 25, 2020	0.5/2	2.16	TBD	TBD	TBD	TBD
18	"Best Supporting Husband"	March 17, 2020	0.6/3	2.67	TBD	TBD	TBD	TBD
19	"Dad Bod-y of Work"	March 24, 2020	0.6/3	2.64	TBD	TBD	TBD	TBD
20	"A Game of Chicken"	April 7, 2020	0.6	2.69	TBD	TBD	TBD	TBD
21	"Earl, Interrupted"	April 14, 2020	0.5	2.23	TBD	TBD	TBD	TBD
22	"...Baby One More Time"	April 28, 2020	0.5	2.53	TBD	TBD	TBD	TBD
23	"Love, Boat"	May 5, 2020	0.4	2.53	TBD	TBD	TBD	TBD
