= The Jake Effect =

American sit-com

- Created by: Jonathan Groff
- Starring: Jason Bateman; Greg Grunberg; Leslie Grossman; Kyle Gass; Patricia Belcher; Nikki Cox; Will Schaub
- Composers: W.G. Snuffy Walden; Troy Hardy
- Country of origin: United States
- Original language: English
- No. of seasons: 1
- No. of episodes: 7 (1 unaired)

Production
- Camera setup: Single-camera
- Running time: 30 minutes
- Production companies: Red Pulley Productions; NBC Studios

Original release
- Network: Bravo

The Jake Effect is an American sitcom starring Jason Bateman, Nikki Cox, and Greg Grunberg. Seven episodes were produced, to premiere in midseason of 2002, but NBC cancelled the series before a single episode aired.

In 2006, Bravo started airing the series in the "Brilliant But Cancelled" block.

== Synopsis ==
Jake Galvin (Jason Bateman) is a successful lawyer who has grown disdainful of his job after his latest successful case allows a client to dump Paradichlorobenzene into the Wabash River. Jake then decides to quit his job and join a program where professionals from other fields become teachers.

== Cast ==
- Jason Bateman – Jake Galvin
- Greg Grunberg – Nick Case
- Leslie Grossman – Kimmy Ponder
- Kyle Gass – Mr. Seissner
- Patricia Belcher – Vice Principal M. Curtis
- Nikki Cox – Liza Wheeler

== Episodes ==
- Pilot
- Only Connect
- Flight School
- Parent Teacher Conference
- Don't Mess With Sloppy
- The Jerk Who Came
- The Intervention
