= Benched (TV series) =

American sitcom

- Genre: Comedy
- Created by: Michaela Watkins; Damon Jones
- Starring: Eliza Coupe; Jay Harrington; Carter MacIntyre; Oscar Nunez; Jolene Purdy
- Country of origin: United States
- Original language: English
- No. of seasons: 1
- No. of episodes: 12

Production
- Executive producers: Michaela Watkins; Damon Jones; John Enbom; Mark Gordon; Andrea Shay
- Camera setup: Single-camera
- Running time: 22 minutes
- Production companies: The Mark Gordon Company; ABC Signature

Original release
- Network: USA Network
- Release: October 28 – December 30, 2014

Benched is an American single-camera sitcom, created by Michaela Watkins and Damon Jones, about a high-powered corporate lawyer's fall from grace into the rough-and-tumble world of a public defender. The series stars Eliza Coupe and Jay Harrington in pivotal roles with Maria Bamford, Jolene Purdy, Carter MacIntyre and Oscar Nunez as the supporting cast. The show premiered on USA Network on October 28, 2014.

On January 14, 2015, USA Network cancelled Benched after one season because of low ratings. The series premiered to 870,000 viewers in October, and while it held steady for much of its 12-episode run, its showing remained modest. Despite cancellation, Benched received mostly positive reviews during its short run with the pairing of Coupe and Harrington being pointed as the highlight of the show.

== Cast ==
- Eliza Coupe as Nina Whitley, a career-driven corporate attorney who has a nervous breakdown and becomes a Los Angeles County Public Defender
- Jay Harrington as Phil Quinlan, Nina's colleague
- Oscar Nunez as Carlos, Nina's colleague
- Jolene Purdy as Micah, an intern in the Public Defender's Office
- Carter MacIntyre as Trent Barber, Nina's former fiancé and professional nemesis

=== Recurring ===
- Maria Bamford as Cheryl, one of Nina's colleagues, described by the USA Network website as "useless and empathetic" and the "comic relief" of the office
- Jack McGee as Burt, Nina's boss at the public defender's office
- Gary Anthony Williams as Geoffrey, the new boss who replaces Burt, who is on extended-leave after having surgery.
- Fred Melamed as Judge Don Nelson, the exasperated judge who usually has it out for Nina
- Cedric Yarbough as Morris, the transactional bailiff in Judge Nelson's courtroom
- Peter Spruyt as Larry, one of Nina's colleagues, who's referred to as "Boring Larry" by everyone in the office
- Catherine Reitman as Debbie, Nina's former colleague in her old lawfirm. She was also given the promotion at Nina's old lawfirm that she expected to get
- Albert Tsai as Walker, a 10-year-old boy that Trent sponsors and brings into the courtroom, where he meets Oscar and slowly get along with each other

== Development and production ==
On May 17, 2012, the American cable television network USA ordered a pilot presentation directed by Michael Fresco, from the script by Watkins and Jones. Eliza Coupe signed on to star in the lead role of the series, produced by John Enbom, Mark Gordon and Andrea Shay. On January 24, 2014, a 12-episode first season was ordered, with Jay Harrington joining the series.

Casting announcements on the remaining series regular roles began in the following February, with Oscar Nunez cast in the series regular role of Carlos, a public defender and new colleague of Nina's. Shortly afterwards, Jolene Purdy was cast in the series regular role of Micah, an intern in the Public Defender's Office. Carter MacIntyre was the last actor to join in the series regular role of Trent, Nina's former fiancée and professional nemesis.

== Episodes ==
| No. | Title | Directed by | Written by | Original release date | US viewers (millions) |
|---|---|---|---|---|---|
| 1 | "Pilot" | Michael Fresco | Michaela Watkins & Damon Jones | October 28, 2014 | 0.87 |
| 2 | "Downsizing" | Claire Scanlon | Andy Berman | November 4, 2014 | 0.98 |
| 3 | "Hooked & Booked" | Claire Scanlon | Lindsey Shockley | November 11, 2014 | 0.77 |
| 4 | "Sell It" | Victor Nelli, Jr. | Damon Jones & Michaela Watkins | November 18, 2014 | 0.75 |
| 5 | "Shark, Actually" | Tristram Shapeero | Joanna Calo | November 25, 2014 | 0.78 |
| 6 | "Rights & Wrongs" | Victor Nelli, Jr. | John Enbom | December 2, 2014 | 0.93 |
| 7 | "Curry Favor" | John Enbom | Michaela Watkins & Damon Jones | December 9, 2014 | 1.00 |
| 8 | "Diamond Is a Girl's Worst Friend" | Tristram Shapeero | Ben Smith | December 16, 2014 | 0.75 |
| 9 | "A New Development" | Michael McDonald | Jim Cashman | December 23, 2014 | 0.87 |
| 10 | "Solitary Refinement" | Michael McDonald | Jessica Conrad | December 23, 2014 | 0.64 |
| 11 | "Campaign Contributions" | Eric Appel | Ari Berkowitz & Scott Hanscom | December 30, 2014 | 0.85 |
| 12 | "Brief Encounters" | Eric Appel | Andy Berman & Lindsey Shockley | December 30, 2014 | 0.72 |

== Reception ==
Benched received positive reviews from television critics and holds a score of 63/100 on Metacritic. It also holds a 67% fresh ratings on review aggregator site Rotten Tomatoes with the site consensus stating, "Benched's talented ensemble raises the show above its trite writing, resulting in a nicely diverting half-hour of comedy." Alexa Planje of The A.V. Club gave the series the most praise saying, "From the writing, to the cast, to impactful details like the spot-on styling and sets, Benched exudes confidence and commitment." Melissa Maerz of Entertainment Weekly lauded the series and Eliza Coupe's performance and said, "Benched is more lightweight [than Enlightened], but it's encouragingly funny thanks to Coupe, whose attempts at anger management showcase impeccable comic timing." Maureen Ryan of The Huffington Post also gave a positive review writing, "It's rare to come across a comedy that displays such admirable focus and delivers such smartly packaged slices of diverting escapism. More, please." On the negative side, Mary McNamara of Los Angeles Times wrote, "Benched is nowhere near as funny as it thinks it is, mainly because Watkins and Jones seem to believe that the endless humiliations of a thin, attractive, previously well-compensated blond woman are all it takes to make people laugh."

== Groundlings ==
On 3 November 2014, Groundlings alumni Michaela Watkins and Damon Jones appeared with cast members, Groundlings alumni, and friends including Eliza Coupe, Oscar Nunez, Jim Rash, Gary Anthony Williams, Annie Sertich, Jeremy Rowley, Jim Cashman, Cedric Yarbrough and Maria Bamford to perform at The Groundlings Theatre, presented by USA Network
