= Owen H. M. Smith =

American actor

Owen Smith
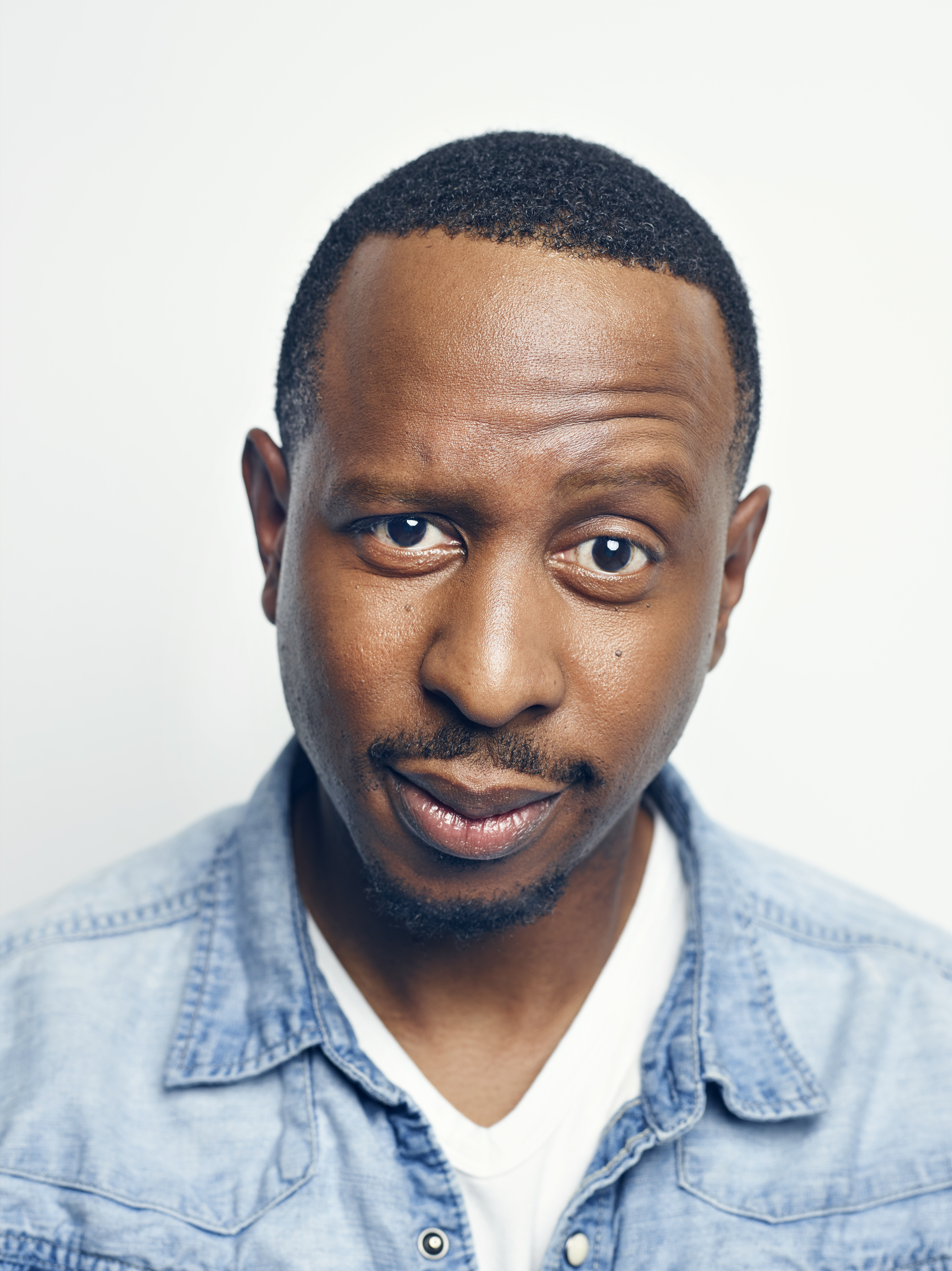
- Owen Smith in Los Angeles, CA
- Born: July 3, 1973 (age 53); Nassau, Bahamas
- Other name: Owen H. M. Smith
- Education: Notre Dame University
- Occupations: Television Producer, Writer, Actor, Comedian

Owen Smith is a Bahamian-born American television producer, writer, actor and comedian. He spent his formative years in P.G. County Maryland.

Smith has written for such television series as Black-ish, Survivor's Remorse, Run the World, The Arsenio Hall Show, The Nightly Show with Larry Wilmore and Whitney and acted on such series as Everybody Hates Chris.

Smith is the creator, showrunner and executive producer of Crutch Paramount Plus series that is a spinoff of CBS Network's The Neighborhood. He also served as the showrunner and executive producer on the fourth season of The Last O.G. starting Tracy Morgan.

As a comedian he has performed Stand-up on Conan and The Late Show with Stephen Colbert. He is a paid regular at the Comedy Store in Hollywood.

As a personality he has appeared multiple times on the Joe Rogan Experience. He co-hosted the podcast "Alias Smith and LeRoi" with comedian Ali LeRoi.
