= Lindsey Shockley =

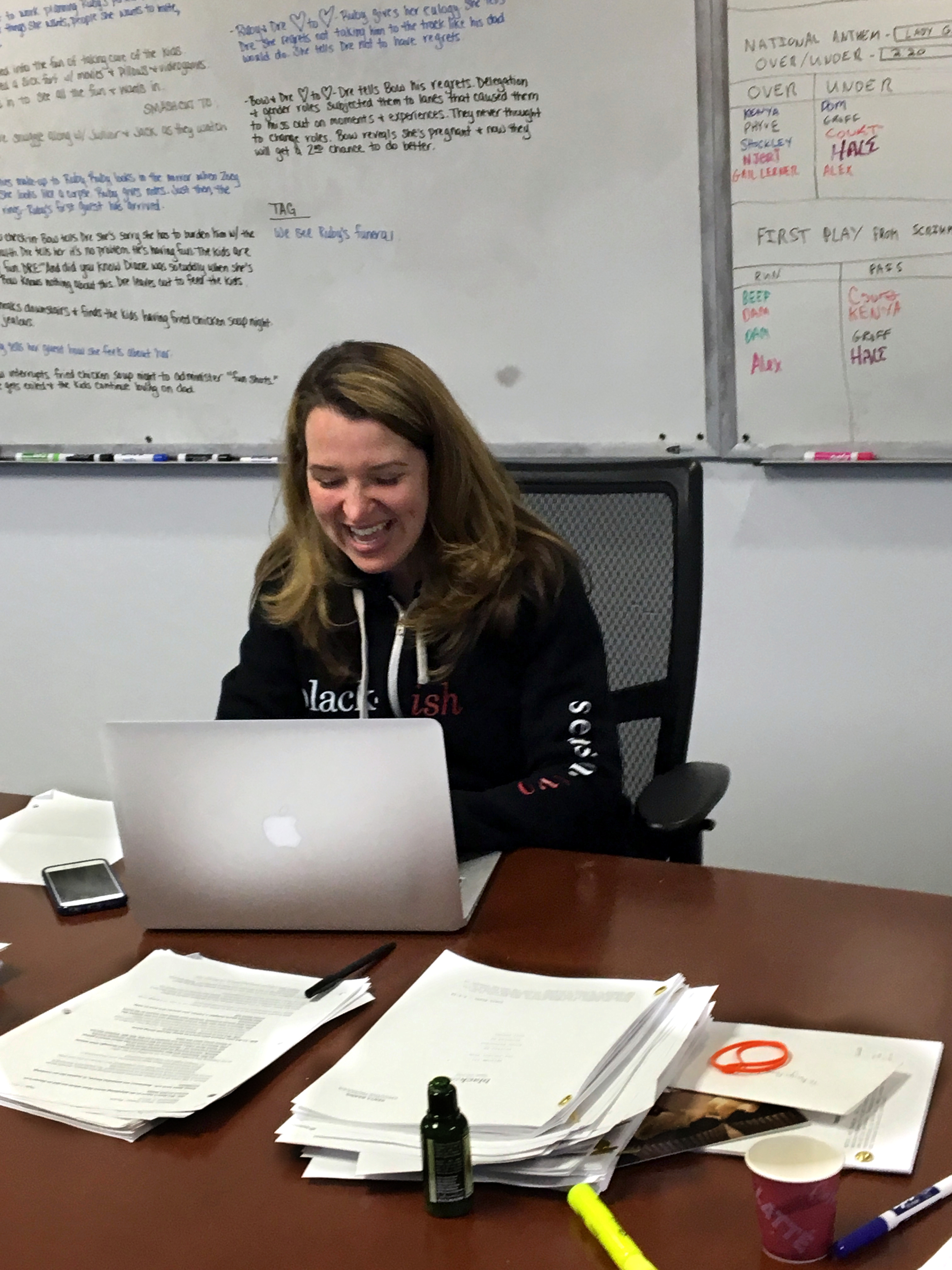
- Born: Cincinnati, Ohio
- Education: University of Pennsylvania
- Occupations: Television Writer, Producer
- Spouse: Steven Edell (m. 2012; 1 child)

Lindsey Shockley is an American comedy writer, producer and improviser best known for her work on HBO's Hello Ladies and ABC's Blackish. Shockley recently served as Executive Producer on Season 5 of ABC's Blackish.

== Early life ==
Shockley was born in Cincinnati, Ohio and grew up in Chapel Hill, North Carolina, the daughter of Linda and William Shockley. She helped found her high school's improv comedy team East Chapel Hill High's "Randomax".

In 2003, Shockley graduated summa cum laude from the University of Pennsylvania with a BA in Communications. In 2007, Shockley earned an MFA from University of Southern California's School of Cinematic Arts in Film Production. While at USC, her short film she wrote and directed, The Truth About Faces, garnered attention for being shot entirely in one continuous take. Once moving to Los Angeles, Shockley took classes and studied improv comedy at the Upright Citizens Brigade and performed at the Improv Comedy Lab with her improv team, "The Cabinet".

== Career ==
In 2010, Shockley began her TV writing career on NBC's Perfect Couples. She went on to write for ABC's Work It, Fox's Ben and Kate, HBO's Hello Ladies, ABC's Trophy Wife, and USA's Benched. In 2014, she began writing on ABC's Blackish where she currently serves as an Executive Producer on the show's sixth season. In 2014, Shockley signed her first overall deal with ABC Studios to develop new projects and serve as a writer/producer on Blackish. The deal stemmed from her work on ABC Studios' shows Hello Ladies, Trophy Wife, and Benched. In 2017, Shockley's original pilot idea Unit Zero was picked up by ABC Studios. Shockley wrote the script as well as executive produced the pilot alongside Kenya Barris.

== Personal life ==
In 2012, Shockley married drama writer Steven Edell. The two met while in graduate school at USC's School of Cinematic Arts. In 2014, they welcomed their first child.

== Filmography ==
Year	Title	Role	Episodes
2011	Perfect Couples	Staff Writer	1.10 "Perfect Exes"
2012	Work It	Staff Writer	1.07 "Girl Fight"
2012-2013	Ben and Kate	Story Editor	1.08 "Reunion," 1.16 "Ethics 101"
2013	Hello Ladies	Executive Story Editor	
2013–2014	Trophy Wife	Executive Story Editor, Co-Producer	1.04 "The Breakup," 1.10 "Twas The Night Before Christmas... Or Twas It?," 1.16 "The Wedding: Part One"
2014	Benched	Co-Producer	1.03 "Hooked and Booked," 1.12 "Brief Encounters"
2017	Unit Zero	Creator, Executive Producer	Pilot
2014–Present	Blackish	Executive Producer	1.06 "The Prank King," 1.12 "Martin Luther sKiing Day," 2.07 "Charlie in Charge," 2.18 "Black Nanny," 3.06 "The Purge," 4.10 "Working Girl," 4.15 "White Breakfast," 5.06 "Friends Without Benefits," 5.22 "FriDre Night Lights"

== Awards ==
Year	Award	Category	Nominated work	Result
2014	TV Guide Award	Favorite New Show	Blackish	Nominated
2015	Women's Image Network Award	Outstanding Comedy Series	Blackish	Nominated
2015	People's Choice Awards	Favorite New TV Comedy	Blackish	Nominated
2015	Teen Choice Awards	Choice TV: Breakout Show	Blackish	Nominated
2015	NAACP Image Awards	Outstanding Comedy Series	Blackish	Won
2015	African-American Film Critics Association	Best TV Comedy	Blackish	Won
2016	AFI Awards	TV Program of the Year	Blackish	Won
2016	Critics' Choice Television Awards	Best Comedy Series	Blackish	Nominated
2016	NAACP Image Awards	Outstanding Comedy Series	Blackish	Won
2016	Peabody Awards	2015 Peabody Award	Blackish	Won
2016	68th Primetime Emmy Awards	Outstanding Comedy Series	Blackish	Nominated
2017	74th Golden Globe Awards	Best Series: Musical or Comedy	Blackish	Nominated
2017	NAACP Image Awards	Outstanding Comedy Series	Blackish	Won
2017	MTV Awards	Best American Story	Blackish	Won
2017	69th Primetime Emmy Awards	Outstanding Comedy Series	Blackish	Nominated
2018	NAACP Image Awards	Outstanding Comedy Series	Blackish	Won
2018	70th Primetime Emmy Awards	Outstanding Comedy Series	Blackish	Nominated
