= Jude Weng =

American director

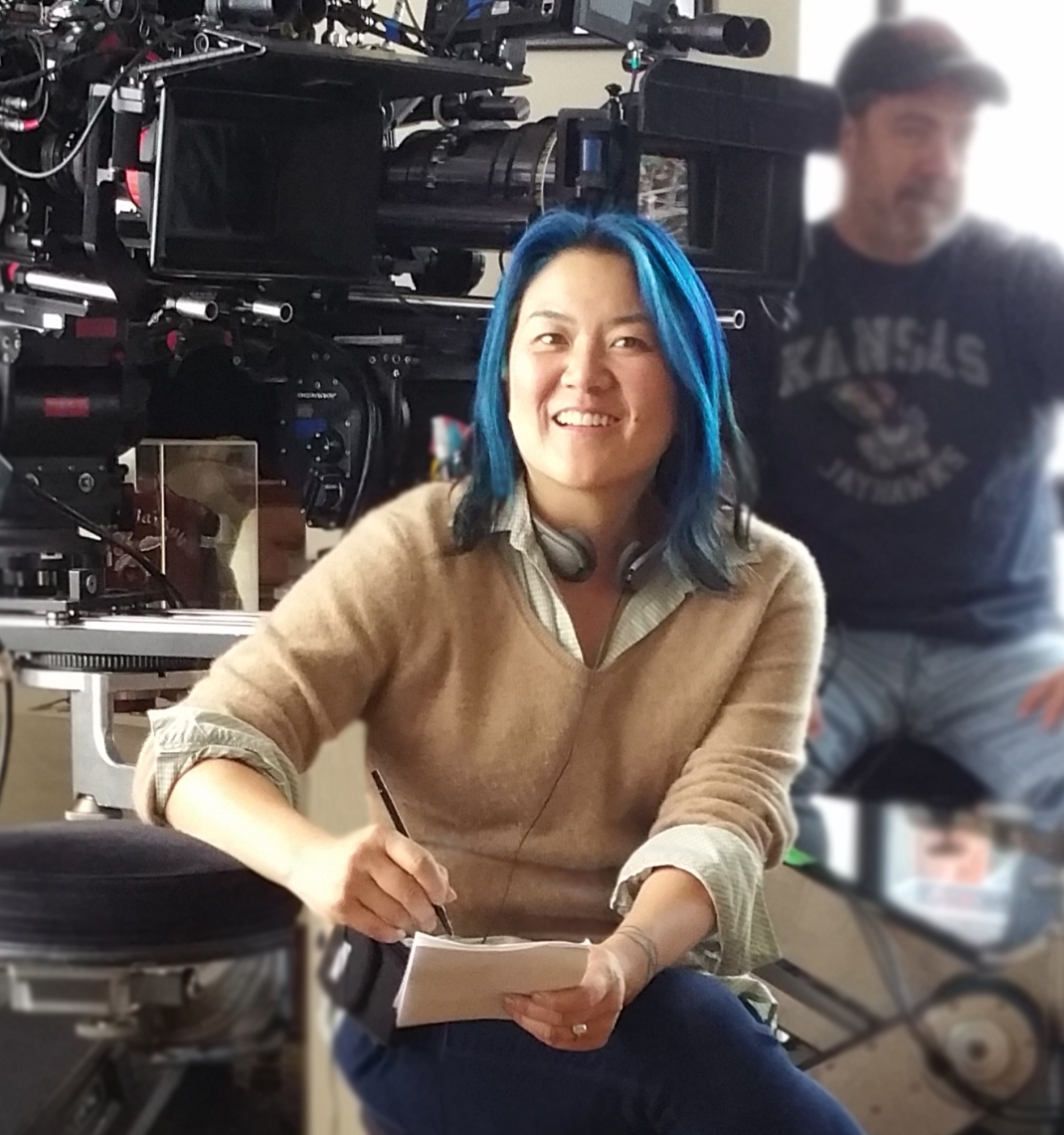
- Jude Weng on the set of Fresh Off the Boat, November 2016
- Occupation: Television director
- Writing career
- Notable work: Fresh Off the Boat

Jude Weng is a director of episodic TV and feature films. Her episode of Party Down, "First Annual P12A Symposium", was selected as a Perfect Episode by Vanity Fair, and Rolling Stone Magazine chose her episode of Lucky Hank, "The Clock", as a Top 10 Best Episode of Television in 2023.

== Career ==
Weng's episodic experience includes both multi- and single-camera half-hour comedies as well as one-hour dramas. Directing credits include Black-ish (ABC), The Good Place (NBC), iZombie(The CW), Crashing (HBO), Unbreakable Kimmy Schmidt (Netflix), and Only Murders in the Building (Hulu) as well as multiple episodes of Fresh Off the Boat (ABC), Crazy Ex-Girlfriend (The CW), Life in Pieces (CBS), Young Sheldon (CBS), Call Me Kat (FOX), cult-comedy "Party Down" revival (Starz), and "Camping" starring Jennifer Garner and David Tennant (HBO).

Most recently Weng has directed the post-apocalyptic vehicular-combat action comedy "Twisted Metal" starring Anthony Mackie, genre-bending "Quantum Leap", "Ghosts", "Frasier" (which sees the return of the beloved character Bebe Glazer), the Amazon Prime hit series "The Summer I Turned Pretty" based on the Jenny Han novels, and "Matlock" starring Kathy Bates.

Weng's film credits include directing the Netflix original Finding 'Ohana, a family action-adventure.

Weng's professional training includes the American Film Institute's Directing Workshop for Women. Disney's ABC Directing Program, Warner Bros. Television Directors' Workshop, and the HBOAccess Writing Fellowship.

In addition to her directing work, Weng is an instructor and mentor for the Paramount Directing Initiative which is training the next generation of television directors.
