= Courtney Lilly =

American television producer and showrunner

- Education: Columbia University (BA)
- Occupation(s): Television producer and writer
- Years active: 2002–present
- Known for: Showrunner of Black-ish
- Awards: Peabody Awards (2015)

Courtney Lilly is an American television producer. He is the showrunner of Black-ish, Mixed-ish, and Grown-ish.

== Biography ==
Lilly received his B.A. from Columbia University in 1997 and worked as a journalist at Providence Journal-Bulletin, before winning a Nickelodeon Writing Fellowship in 2000, kicking off his television writing career. He started his career as a writer for Arrested Development and has written for such shows as My Boys, The Cleveland Show and Undateable.

Lilly joined Black-ish as co-executive producer in season one before being promoted to executive producer and was named showrunner at the start of Season 6 in 2019. He was also named showrunner of Black-ish spinoff show Mixed-ish for Season 2.

In 2017, Lilly signed an overall deal with ABC Signature and renewed it in 2020.

In 2021, it was announced that Lilly will be writing and show-running an animated adaption of Baratunde Thurston's book How to Be Black.

He became a co-showrunner of Grown-ish in 2022.

== Awards and nominations ==
Lilly has been nominated for four Primetime Emmys for his work on Black-ish as co-executive producer and executive producer. He was also a two-time Writers Guild of America Awards nominee for his work on Everybody Hates Chris and Arrested Development.

He was also a co-recipient of a Peabody Award in 2015.

== Personal life ==
Lilly is married to Miranda Banks, a professor of film and television at Loyola Marymount University. The couple lives in Los Feliz, Los Angeles.
