= Black-ish =

American television sitcom (2014–2022)

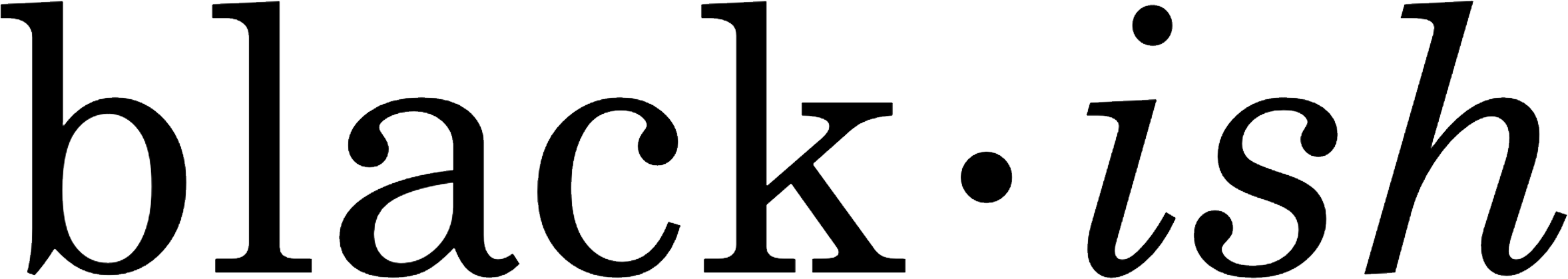
- Genre: Sitcom
- Created by: Kenya Barris
- Showrunners: Kenya Barris; Larry Wilmore; Kenny Smith; Jonathan Groff; Courtney Lilly
- Starring: Anthony Anderson; Tracee Ellis Ross; Yara Shahidi; Marcus Scribner; Miles Brown; Marsai Martin; Jeff Meacham; Jenifer Lewis; Laurence Fishburne; Peter Mackenzie; Deon Cole; August and Berlin Gross; Katlyn Nichol
- Narrated by: Anthony Anderson
- Theme music composer: Transcenders
- Country of origin: United States
- Original language: English
- No. of seasons: 8
- No. of episodes: 176 (list of episodes)

Production
- Executive producers: Anthony Anderson; Brian Dobbins; Helen Sugland; Jonathan Groff; Kenya Barris; Kenny Smith; Larry Wilmore; Paul Young; Laurence Fishburne; Peter Principato; Tom Russo; Gail Lerner; Courtney Lilly
- Camera setup: Single-camera
- Running time: 22 minutes
- Production companies: ABC Signature (Note: Credited as ABC Studios through season 6); Wilmore Films (pilot); Khalabo Ink Society; Cinema Gypsy Productions; Principato-Young Entertainment (2014–2018); Artists First (2018–2022)

Original release
- Network: ABC
- Release: September 24, 2014 – April 19, 2022

Related
- Grown-ish; Mixed-ish

Black-ish (stylized as black·ish) is an American sitcom television series created by Kenya Barris. It aired on ABC from September 24, 2014, to April 19, 2022, running for eight seasons with 175 episodes. Black-ish follows an upper class well-off Black family headed by Andre "Dre" Johnson, a successful advertising executive (Anthony Anderson), and his wife Rainbow "Bow", an anesthesiologist (Tracee Ellis Ross). The show revolves around the wealthy Johnson family as they juggle personal, familial and sociopolitical issues, particularly in trying to reconcile their desire to stay true to their Black identities with their choice to live in a wealthy, suburban white neighborhood.

The show also features confident oldest child Zoey (Yara Shahidi), nerdy elder son Andre Jr., aka Junior (Marcus Scribner), and twins Jack (Miles Brown) and Diane (Marsai Martin). In later seasons, additional characters including Dre's mother Ruby Johnson (Jenifer Lewis), his co-workers Josh Oppenhol (Jeff Meacham) and Charlie Telphy (Deon Cole), his boss Leslie Stevens (Peter Mackenzie), his and Bow's youngest child Devante Johnson (August and Berlin Gross), and Junior's girlfriend Olivia Lockhart (Katlyn Nichol) are promoted to series regulars, while Dre's father (and Ruby's ex-husband that she eventually remarried), Earl Johnson (Laurence Fishburne), is a recurring character throughout the series.

Throughout its run, Black-ish received positive reviews. The show received Emmy and Golden Globe nominations for Outstanding Comedy Series and a TCA Award for Outstanding Achievement in Comedy, while Ross received individual praise, winning the Golden Globe Award for Best Actress – Television Series Musical or Comedy for her role as Bow.

In May 2020, ABC renewed the series for a seventh season, which premiered on October 21, 2020. Ahead of its seventh season premiere, an hour-long Election-themed special was aired on October 4, 2020. In May 2021, ABC renewed the series for an eighth and final season, which premiered on January 4, 2022, and consists of 13 episodes. The series finale aired on April 19, 2022.

The show's success prompted a spin-off titled Grown-ish, which stars Shahidi, and subsequently Scribner, as their respective characters Zoey and Junior as they leave home to attend college. In May 2019, ABC ordered a short-lived prequel series, Mixed-ish, which centers on a young Bow and her biracial family in the 1980s.

== Cast and characters ==
=== Main cast ===
Actor	Character	Seasons							
Actor	Character	1	2	3	4	5	6	7	8
Anthony Anderson	Andre "Dre" Johnson Sr.	Main	Main	Main	Main	Main	Main	Main	Main
Tracee Ellis Ross	Dr. Rainbow "Bow" Johnson	Main	Main	Main	Main	Main	Main	Main	Main
Yara Shahidi	Zoey Johnson	Main	Main	Main	Recurring	Recurring	Recurring	Recurring	Recurring
Marcus Scribner	Andre "Junior" Johnson Jr.	Main	Main	Main	Main	Main	Main	Main	Main
Miles Brown	Jack Johnson	Main	Main	Main	Main	Main	Main	Main	Main
Marsai Martin	Diane Johnson	Main	Main	Main	Main	Main	Main	Main	Main
Jenifer Lewis	Ruby Johnson	Recurring	Main	Main	Main	Main	Main	Main	Main
Jeff Meacham	Josh Oppenhol	Recurring	Main	Recurring	Recurring	Recurring	Main	Main	Main
Peter Mackenzie	Leslie Stevens	Recurring	Recurring	Main	Main	Main	Main	Main	Main
Deon Cole	Charlie Telphy	Recurring	Recurring	Recurring	Main	Main	Main	Main	Main
August and Berlin Gross	DeVante Johnson			Guest	Main	Main	Main	Main	Main
Katlyn Nichol	Olivia Lockhart						Guest	Main	Main

- Anthony Anderson as Andre "Dre" Johnson: a wealthy advertising executive at Stevens & Lido, who wishes to ensure a balance of Black culture is intertwined with his family's upper middle class, ultra-suburban upbringing. He is Rainbow's husband. Dre cares about his reputation, his favorite child is Zoey, and he is infamous for his shopping problem, particularly with shoes. He has trouble bonding with Junior due to their differing personalites. He is often mocked for his race at work. Andre has a strong bond with his mother.
- Tracee Ellis Ross as Dr. Rainbow "Bow" Johnson: an anesthesiologist and Dre's wife, who wishes to retain a place in her children's lives. She comes from a biracial family where her father is white and her mother is Black. She typically has the strongest bond with Junior. She often finds Dre's ideas to be absurd, serving as the sensible one in their parenting pair. She is a feminist and wants her children to be modern working people and not conform to traditional gender roles. Laila Lockhart Kraner portrayed "Bow" in flashbacks seen in four episodes.
- Yara Shahidi as Zoey Johnson (starring seasons 1–3; recurring seasons 4–8): Dre and Rainbow's oldest child, as well as Dre's favorite child. She is a stereotypical teenage girl, caring mostly about looks and boys. However, she is also responsible and smart and cares for her younger siblings. Shahidi left the main cast at the end of season 3 to star in her own spin-off series Grown-ish.
- Marcus Scribner as Andre "Junior" Johnson Jr.: Dre and Rainbow's self-proclaimed "nerdy" second oldest child. He typically lacks teenage savvy, but is very smart and is taught these things, albeit with a hint of disdain, by his relatively shallow and self-aggrandizing father and siblings. He has a strong bond with his mother. He dates Megan from seasons 3–4 and Olivia from seasons 6–8. He stars in the last two seasons of Grown-ish following the conclusion of Black-ish.
- Marsai Martin as Diane Johnson: Dre and Rainbow's youngest daughter, third oldest child, and fraternal twin of Jack, who considers herself smarter and more mature than him. She is often considered evil by her family and friends, bullying everyone she knows, particularly Charlie. She shows a lack of empathy, care and consideration for other people, but loves her family. This is shown when the twins separate temporarily in season 2 and she misses it.
- Miles Brown as Jackson "Jack" Johnson: Dre and Rainbow's fourth oldest child and fraternal twin of Diane. He is 7 years old at the beginning of the show and typically aloof, but also idolizes his father, and is Diane's younger twin brother. He relies on his cuteness despite his lack of intelligence in the earlier seasons.
- Jenifer Lewis as Ruby Johnson (starring seasons 2–8; recurring season 1): Dre's mother, who does not get along with Rainbow. She is heavily religious and pro-Black on several issues. She shares many traits with Diane, and has a strong bond with Dre.
- Jeff Meacham as Josh Oppenhol (starring seasons 2 and 6–8; recurring seasons 1 & 3–5): Dre's co-worker, who is often disrespected and undervalued by his peers.
- Peter Mackenzie as Leslie Stevens (starring seasons 3–8; recurring seasons 1–2): Dre's boss and co-owner of Stevens & Lido, who engages in hipster racism and shows implicit bias in regards to social issues.
- Deon Cole as Charlie Telphy (starring seasons 4–8; recurring seasons 1–3): Dre's eccentric co-worker and adulthood best friend. Cole also features as part of the main cast of Grown-ish. Charlie is very mysterious, such as having two families, and his character has many inconsistencies. He often forgets about his son, Eustace. He is divorced.
- August and Berlin Gross as DeVante Johnson (starring seasons 4–6 and 8; guest season 3): Dre and Rainbow's youngest child who appears from season 3 onwards. Rainbow found out she was pregnant with him in "Daddy Dre-Care". He is born in the episode "Sprinkles".
- Katlyn Nichol as Olivia Lockhart (starring seasons 7–8; guest season 6): Junior's girlfriend. They had a serious relationship for about 2 years, until Olivia broke up with Junior after their attempt at a long-distance relationship didn't work out.

=== Recurring cast ===
- Laurence Fishburne as Earl "Pops" Johnson: Dre's father and Ruby's ex-husband (that she later remarried) who lives with the Johnsons. Credited as a special guest star.
- Anna Deavere Smith as Alicia Johnson: Rainbow, Santamonica, and Johan's widowed mother
- Nelson Franklin as Connor Stevens: Leslie Stevens' son who works at Stevens & Lido. He is constantly implied to have committed homicide.
- Beau Bridges as Paul Johnson: Rainbow, Santamonica, and Johan's late father
- Raven-Symoné as Rhonda Johnson: Dre's sister who's a lesbian
- Nicole Sullivan as Janine: The Johnsons' neighbor, who is unconsciously racially biased
- Wanda Sykes as Daphne Lido: The wife of Stevens & Lido's founding partner who takes over as co-owner
- Allen Maldonado as Curtis, Dre's assistant
- Catherine Reitman as Lucy, Dre's co-worker who often faces sexism in the office
- Daveed Diggs as Johan Johnson: Rainbow and Santamonica's brother
- Rashida Jones as Santamonica Johnson: Rainbow and Johan's sister
- Quvenzhané Wallis as Kyra
- Issac Ryan Brown as Young Dre
- Faizon Love as Sha: Dre's childhood best friend
- Jennie Pierson as Ms. Davis
- Emerson Min as Mason: Jack's best friend
- Liz Jenkins as Ms. Biggs: Principal of Valley Glen Prep

== Episodes ==
Series overview
Season	Episodes	Originally released	
Season	Episodes	First released	Last released
1	24	September 24, 2014	May 20, 2015
2	24	September 23, 2015	May 18, 2016
3	24	September 21, 2016	May 10, 2017
4	24 (Note: Twenty-four episodes were produced for season 4, but the thirteenth produced episode (titled "Please, Baby, Please") was shelved by ABC due to its controversial content, hence only 23 episodes were aired. "Please, Baby, Please" later debuted on Hulu on August 10, 2020.)	October 3, 2017	May 15, 2018
5	23	October 16, 2018	May 21, 2019
6	23	September 24, 2019	May 5, 2020
7 (Note: A total of 21 episodes were produced for the seventh season: a two-part special episode, which aired on October 4, 2020, before the season premiere, and another nineteen contributing towards the regular season, which officially premiered on October 21, 2020.)	Special	October 4, 2020	
7	19	October 21, 2020	May 18, 2021
8	13	January 4, 2022	April 19, 2022

== Production ==
=== Development and casting ===
Black-ish first appeared on the development slate at ABC in October 2013, when it was reported that the project, which would star Anthony Anderson, had received a script commitment. On January 16, 2014, ABC greenlit the pilot episode. Two weeks later, Larry Wilmore joined the show as showrunner. In mid-February, Laurence Fishburne was cast as the father of Anderson's character, and Tracee Ellis Ross signed on as the female lead.

=== Filming ===
On May 8, 2014, ABC picked up the pilot to the series for the 2014–15 television season. A few days later, Anderson announced that Larry Wilmore would be stepping down as showrunner early in the show's run due to his forthcoming late night show, The Nightly Show with Larry Wilmore.

On May 7, 2015, ABC renewed the series for a second season. On March 3, 2016, ABC renewed the series for a third season. On May 10, 2017, ABC renewed the series for a fourth season. On May 11, 2018, ABC renewed the series for a fifth season. On December 14, 2018, ABC picked up 2 additional episodes for the fifth season bringing the season total to 24 episodes. On May 2, 2019, ABC renewed the series for a sixth season. On May 21, 2020, ABC renewed the series for a seventh season. On October 23, 2020, ABC picked up 6 additional episodes for the seventh season bringing the season total to 21 episodes. On May 14, 2021, ABC renewed the series for an eighth and final season.

== Reception ==
=== Nielsen ratings ===
Season	Timeslot (ET)	# Ep.	Premiered			Ended			TV Season	Rank	Viewers (in millions)
Season	Timeslot (ET)	# Ep.	Date	Viewers (in millions)	18-49 rating/share	Date	Viewers (in millions)	18-49 rating/share	TV Season	Rank	Viewers (in millions)
1	Wednesday 9:30 p.m.	24	September 24, 2014	11.04	3.3/10	May 20, 2015	5.36	1.6/5	2014–2015	#54	8.49
2	Wednesday 9:30 p.m.	24	September 23, 2015	7.30	2.4/7	May 18, 2016	5.05	1.5/5	2015–2016	#60	7.22
3	Wednesday 9:30 p.m.	24	September 21, 2016	6.39	2.0/7	May 10, 2017	4.75	1.3/5	2016–2017	#59	6.61
4	Tuesday 9:00 p.m.	23	October 3, 2017	4.71	1.5/5	May 15, 2018	4.96	1.2/5	2017–2018	#84	5.47
5	Tuesday 9:00 p.m.	23	October 16, 2018	4.10	1.0/5	May 21, 2019	2.92	0.7/3	2018–2019	#107	4.32
6	Tuesday 9:30 p.m.	23	September 24, 2019	3.49	0.9/4	May 5, 2020	2.53	0.4/2	2019–2020	#90	3.72
7	Wednesday 9:30 p.m. (1–6); Tuesday 9:00 p.m. (7–21)	21	October 21, 2020	3.09	0.6/3	May 18, 2021	1.70	0.4/2	2020–2021	#99	3.11
8	Tuesday 9:30 p.m. (1–12); Tuesday 9:00 p.m. (13)	13	January 4, 2022	2.75	0.5/2	April 19, 2022	2.52	0.4/2	2021–2022	TBA	TBA

=== Season 1 (2014–2015) ===
Rotten Tomatoes gives Season 1 an approval rating of 87% based on 62 reviews, with an average rating of 7.4/10. The site's consensus states, "Although it seems uncertain of its target audience, black-ish ingratiates with a diverse cast and engaging cultural issues". Metacritic gave Season 1 a weighted average score of 77 out of 100, based on 34 critics, indicating "generally favorable reviews".

=== Season 2 (2015–2016) ===
Rotten Tomatoes gives the season an approval rating of 90% based on 17 reviews. Critics generally enjoyed the humor and exploration of familial bonds.

=== Season 3 (2016–2017) ===
Tracee Ellis Ross's performance in this season earned her the Golden Globe Award for Best Actress – Television Series Musical or Comedy in 2017, making her the first Black woman to win the award since 1983.

=== Season 5 (2018–2019) ===
Season 5 received a more mixed reception, with some critics feeling the show has become repetitive. Rotten Tomatoes gave it an approval rating of 80% based on only 5 reviews.

== Spin-offs ==
=== Grown-ish ===
The twenty-third episode of the third season, "Liberal Arts", functioned as a backdoor pilot for a proposed spin-off of the same title, starring Yara Shahidi as her character, Zoey Johnson, goes to college away from the family. Other cast members in the pilot and proposed series were Chris Parnell, Mallory Sparks, Matt Walsh, and Trevor Jackson.

In early May 2017, ABC passed on the pilot, but its sister channel Freeform commenced negotiations to move the project there. On May 19, 2017, Freeform officially ordered 13 episodes of the spin-off, now under the tentative title College-ish. In August 2017, the series changed its title to Grown-ish, and added Francia Raisa, Jordan Buhat and Chloe x Halle as cast members. The series's pilot premiered on January 3, 2018. Parnell and Jackson reprised their roles from the backdoor pilot, while Emily Arlook was also added as Nomi, replacing the character Miriam played by Mallory Sparks.

=== Mixed-ish ===
On May 2, 2019, it was announced that a second spin-off, now titled Mixed-ish had been ordered to series by ABC. In lieu of this, the May 7 episode of season five would be shelved until next season. The episode, titled "Becoming Bow", would follow a young Bow and her family. The series was renewed for a second season on May 21, 2020. In May 2021, the series was canceled after two seasons.

=== Old-ish ===
It was announced in September 2020 that a new spin-off starring Laurence Fishburne and Jenifer Lewis was in the works. However, in May 2021, ABC Entertainment president, Craig Erwich, stated there were no plans for the pilot.
