= Jonathan Groff (writer) =

American television producer

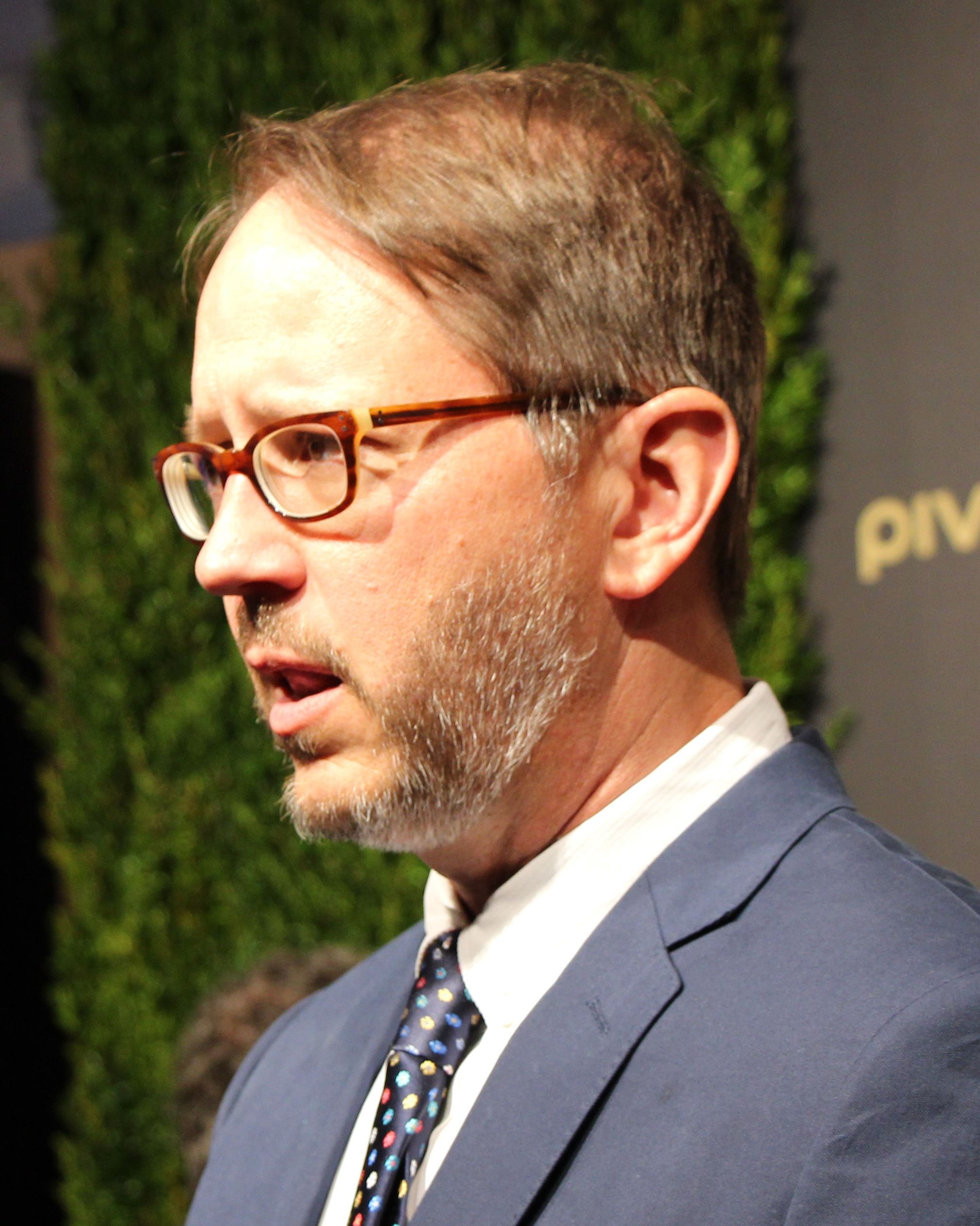
- Groff at the 75th Annual Peabody Awards in 2016
- Born: May 16, 1962 (age 64)
- Education: Brown University (BA)
- Occupations: Screenwriter, producer, actor
- Spouse: Martha Chowning (m. 1996)
- Children: 2
- Relatives: David Groff (brother)
- Writing career
- Years active: 1989–present
- Genre: Comedy

Jonathan Groff (born May 16, 1962) is an American actor, comedian, director, producer, and screenwriter. He is best known for his role as Jerome Sinfeld in the Netflix series blackAF, and as an executive producer of the ABC sitcom black-ish (2014–2022).

Groff graduated from Brown University in 1983 with a Bachelor of Arts in history, initially pursuing a career in stand-up comedy before transitioning to television writing. He wrote for The Jon Stewart Show and Short Attention Span Theater, hosted by Stewart and, later, Marc Maron. Groff was the head writer at Late Night with Conan O'Brien in the late 1990s. After leaving Late Night, Groff developed Father of the Pride with Jeffrey Katzenberg. Subsequently, he was the showrunner for Andy Barker, P.I., co-created with O'Brien. More recently, he has worked on Black-ish and as co-showrunner on Happy Endings.

In March 1995, he was a 5-time undefeated champion on Jeopardy!, winning $60,500, and a semifinalist in the 1995 Tournament of Champions in November. In 2005, he was invited to the Ultimate Tournament of Champions, where he won $34,001 in the first 2 rounds of the tournament before being eliminated.

== Filmography ==
=== Writer ===
Year	Title	Notes
2019	How to Train Your Dragon: Homecoming	
2016	black-ish	2 episodes
2012	Happy Endings	2 episodes
2010	Kung Fu Panda Holiday	
2009	Scrubs	1 episode
2007-2009	How I Met Your Mother	3 episodes
2007	Andy Barker, P.I.	1 episode
2006	The Jake Effect	2 episodes
2004-2005	Father of the Pride	7 episodes
2001	Ed	1 episode
1995-2000	Late Night with Conan O'Brien	464 episodes (431 as head writer)
1993	The Jon Stewart Show	
1989	Short Attention Span Theater	

=== Producer ===
Year	Title	Notes
2014–2022	black-ish	130 episodes (79 as EP, 30 consulting)
2019	mixed-ish	1 episode as EP
2011-2013	Happy Endings	57 episodes as EP
2009-2010	Scrubs	13 episodes (7 as EP, 6 consulting)
2007-2009	How I Met Your Mother	44 episodes as a consulting producer
2007	Andy Barker, P.I.	4 episodes as EP
2006	The Jake Effect	6 episodes as EP
2004-2005	Father of the Pride	7 episodes as EP
2001-2002	Ed	15 episodes as consulting producer

=== Actor ===
Year	Title	Role	Notes
2020	Who Wants to Be a Millionaire	Self	2 episodes
2020	blackAF	Jerome Sinfeld	3 episodes
2014	Maron	Self	1 episode
2010	Kung Fu Panda Holiday	Master Rhino	Voice
1999	Late Night with Conan O'Brien	Self	1 episode
1998	Late Night with Conan O'Brien	Sketch Player	1 episode
1996	The Daily Show	Self - Contributor	1 episode
1991	An Evening at the Improv	Self	1 episode

=== Creator ===
Year	Title
2007	Andy Barker, P.I.
2006	The Jake Effect

=== Director ===
Year	Title	Notes
2018	black-ish	1 episode (Blue Valentine)
2015	black-ish	1 episode (Pops' Pops' Pops)
