= Linda Mendoza =

American film and television director

- Born: Linda Mendoza Kahle; United States
- Occupations: Film director, television director
- Years active: 1985–present

Linda Mendoza Kahle is an American film and television director and stand-up comedian.

Mendoza's directorial career began in 1992, directing promotional segments for Fox and MTV. She then went on to direct/produce segments for Kidsongs and the Nickelodeon sketch comedy series' Roundhouse and All That. Her other television series credits include, The Chris Rock Show, The Brothers García, Unfabulous, Girlfriends, The Bernie Mac Show, Outsourced, MADtv, Scrubs, Gilmore Girls, 30 Rock, Unbreakable Kimmy Schmidt, Suburgatory, Crazy Ex-Girlfriend, and Brooklyn Nine-Nine among other series. She made her feature film directorial debut with the film Chasing Papi in 2003. She has also occasionally performed stand-up comedy, as well as directing specials for stand-up comedians such as Wanda Sykes, Sam Jay, Nikki Glaser, Katherine Ryan, and Tiffany Haddish.

In 2008, Mendoza won an ALMA Award for her direction of the Ugly Betty episode, "Betty's Baby Bump". She is of Mexican American descent.
