= Peter Mackenzie =

American actor (born 1961)

- Born: January 23, 1961 (age 65)
- Occupation: Actor
- Years active: 1987–present
- Height: 6 ft 2 in (188 cm)
- Relatives: Douglas S. Cook (brother)

Peter Mackenzie (born January 23, 1961) is an American actor.

== Career ==
He appeared in films Good Morning, Vietnam (1987), Torch Song Trilogy (1988), Lorenzo's Oil (1992), 42 (2013) and Trumbo (2015). He has had television roles on Herman's Head (1991–1994), ER (2002), Criminal Minds (2005), Gilmore Girls (2006), Grey's Anatomy (2009), How I Met Your Mother (2011) and Black-ish (2014–2022).

== Book exchange ==
In 2014, Mackenzie installed a small curbside book exchange on public land near his home which he called "The Tenn-Mann Library". Popular in the neighborhood, it was cited for a local ordinance violation after an anonymous complaint.

== Personal life ==
Mackenzie's brother, Douglas S. Cook, died in 2015.

== Filmography ==
=== Film ===
| Year | Title | Role | Notes |
|---|---|---|---|
| 1987 | Firehouse | Dickson Willoughby | |
| 1987 | Good Morning, Vietnam | Sergeant #2 at Jimmy Wah's | |
| 1988 | Off Limits | MP | |
| 1988 | Torch Song Trilogy | Young Man #1 | |
| 1992 | Lorenzo's Oil | Immunosuppression Doctor | |
| 1994 | Speechless | Andy | |
| 1995 | Nick of Time | JBN Reporter | |
| 1995 | Theodore Rex | Alex Summers | |
| 1995 | Tom and Huck | Mr. Sneed | |
| 1998 | Major League: Back to the Minors | Carlton 'Doc' Windgate | |
| 1999 | Chill Factor | Technician | |
| 2000 | The In Crowd | Bob Mead | |
| 2002 | One Hour Photo | Hotel Desk Manager | |
| 2004 | Off the Lip | Rick | |
| 2004 | A One Time Thing | Larry | |
| 2006 | Room 6 | Dr. Kent | |
| 2007 | Good Time Max | Anesthesiologist | |
| 2008 | Player 5150 | Mr. Barman | |
| 2009 | It's Complicated | Dr. Allen | |
| 2010 | Five Star Day | Mr. Peterson | |
| 2011 | The Chicago 8 | David Dellinger | |
| 2012 | Project X | Dad | |
| 2013 | 42 | Happy Chandler | |
| 2014 | Earth to Echo | James Hastings | |
| 2014 | Atlas Shrugged Part III: Who Is John Galt? | Head of State Thompson | |
| 2014 | The Hive | Man in Suit | |
| 2015 | Any Day | Dr. Cole | |
| 2015 | Trumbo | Robert Kenny | |
| 2016 | Love Meet Hope | Todd | |
| 2016 | Term Life | Counselor | |
| 2016 | Spaceman | Tim Manning | |
| 2016 | Rules Don't Apply | Gene Handsaker | |
| 2017 | Kings | Police Officer #3 | |
| 2018 | A Simple Wedding | Bill Talbot | |

=== Television ===
| Year | Title | Role | Notes |
|---|---|---|---|
| 1988 | Spenser: For Hire | Lt. Travis Williams | Episode: "McAllister" |
| 1988 | Crossbow | Captain of the Guard | Episode: "Exit the Dragon" |
| 1989 | The Equalizer | 1st Man | Episode: "Past Imperfect" |
| 1989 | Guiding Light | Bruce Daly | Recurring; July - September, 1989 |
| 1991–1994 | Herman's Head | Genius (Intellect) | 72 episodes |
| 1994 | The George Carlin Show | George Washington | Episode: "George Speaks His Mind" |
| 1994 | The Boys Are Back | John | Episode: "The Christmas Show" |
| 1996 | The Faculty | Clark Edwards | 13 episodes |
| 1996 | Night Stand with Dick Dietrick | Chick Hunter | Episode: "Gays in the Military" |
| 1996–1997 | Homeboys in Outer Space | Andrew Lloyd Wellington III | 7 episodes |
| 1998 | Caroline in the City | Lionel | Episode: "Caroline and the Secret Bullfighter: Part 1" |
| 1998, 2004 | The Drew Carey Show | Arbitrator / Mr. Firestein | 2 episodes |
| 1999 | Profiler | Mr. Wells | Episode: "Spree of Love" |
| 1999 | Inherit the Wind | Jesse Dunlap | Television film |
| 1999–2000 | The Parkers | Coach Patrick Melville | 2 episodes |
| 2000 | Malcolm in the Middle | Terry | Episode: "Smunday" |
| 2000 | Strong Medicine | Asher | Episode: "Misconceptions" |
| 2000 | Gideon's Crossing | David Porter | Episode: "The Mistake" |
| 2000 | American Tragedy | Bill Blasier | Television film |
| 2000 | Ally McBeal | Kendall Stevens | Episode: "Tis the Season" |
| 2001 | Dharma & Greg | Matthew | Episode: "Judy & Greg" |
| 2001 | Yes, Dear | Reverend Green | Episode: "The Daddies Group" |
| 2001 | Judging Amy | Howlett | Episode: "Redheaded Stepchild" |
| 2001 | So Little Time | Roger Slotnick | Episode: "Teacher's Pet" |
| 2001–2002 | Off Centre | Jay | 3 episodes |
| 2002 | The Tick | Male Nurse | Episode: "The Terror" |
| 2002 | Will & Grace | Mean Guy | Episode: "Went to a Garden Potty" |
| 2002 | ER | Mr. Pasbalas | Episode: "One Can Only Hope" |
| 2002 | The Practice | D.A. Brenner | Episode: "Small Sacrifices" |
| 2002 | In My Opinion | Tom | Television film |
| 2002, 2008 | CSI: Crime Scene Investigation | Dr. Eisling / Doctor | 2 episodes |
| 2003 | One on One | Blaine Lockraven | Episode: "One Hand Washington's the Other" |
| 2004 | Sweden, Ohio | Howard | Television film |
| 2005 | The West Wing | George Rohr | Episode: "Message of the Week" |
| 2005 | Still Standing | Mr. Kruger | Episode: "Still Beauty and the Greek" |
| 2005 | Twins | Don | Episode: "Model Student" |
| 2005–2021 | American Dad! | Various roles | 10 episodes |
| 2006 | Criminal Minds | Jack Foster | Episode: "Poison" |
| 2006 | Gilmore Girls | Dr. Schultz | 2 episodes |
| 2006 | Cold Case | Harvey James | Episode: "Saving Sammy" |
| 2006 | CSI: Miami | Russell Tanninger | Episode: "Backstabbers" |
| 2006 | Justice | Judge Ira Tasker | Episode: "Christmas Party" |
| 2007 | Big Day | Minister | Episode: "The Unstable Minister" |
| 2007 | Boston Legal | Reid Harrington | Episode: "Selling Sickness" |
| 2007 | Close to Home | Daryl Denham | Episode: "Hoosier Hold Em" |
| 2007 | Crossing Jordan | Frank Ripton | Episode: "Seven Feet Under" |
| 2007 | George Lopez | Dr. Loftusi | Episode: "George Gets Smoking Mad at Benny and Develops an Órale Fixation" |
| 2008 | Eli Stone | Dr. Stephen Goodman | Episode: "Help!" |
| 2009 | My Name Is Earl | Daniel | Episode: "Got the Babysitter Pregnant" |
| 2009 | Grey's Anatomy | Warren Kramer | Episode: "Beat Your Heart Out" |
| 2009 | The Mentalist | Holman Perry | Episode: "Carnelian, Inc." |
| 2009 | Jonas | Mr. Phelps | Episode: "That Ding You Do" |
| 2009 | Curb Your Enthusiasm | Man in Shorts | Episode: "The Hot Towel" |
| 2010 | Law & Order: LA | Attorney Simms | Episode: "Playa Vista" |
| 2011 | Big Love | Bishop | Episode: "Til Death Do Us Part" |
| 2011 | Better with You | Neil | Episode: "Better Without a Job" |
| 2011 | How I Met Your Mother | Mr. Horvath | Episode: "Landmarks" |
| 2011 | State of Georgia | Paul Leary | Episode: "Know When to Fold 'em" |
| 2011 | Circling the Drain | Chris Carroll | Television film |
| 2011–2012 | Harry's Law | Attorney Neville Johnson | 2 episodes |
| 2011–2015 | Hart of Dixie | Reverend Peter Mayfair | 12 episodes |
| 2012 | House of Lies | Brant Butterfield | Episode: "Utah" |
| 2012 | NCIS | Jack Murdoch | Episode: "Rekindled" |
| 2012 | Scandal | Brad Loeb | Episode: "Hunting Season" |
| 2012–2013 | Don't Trust the B— in Apartment 23 | Donald Colburn | 8 episodes |
| 2013 | The Secret Life of the American Teenager | Financial Aid Advisor | Episode: "Money for Nothin'" |
| 2013 | Mad Men | Cliff Perry | Episode: "For Immediate Release" |
| 2013 | Castle | Sgt. Roman | Episode: "Number One Fan" |
| 2013 | Raising Hope | Mr. Gunderson | Episode: "Bee Story" |
| 2013 | Jacked Up | Gordon | Television film |
| 2013, 2018 | It's Always Sunny in Philadelphia | Doctor | 2 episodes |
| 2014 | Bones | Congressman Efran Hadley | Episode: "The Recluse in the Recliner" |
| 2014 | Friends with Better Lives | Jim | Episode: "Something New" |
| 2014 | Franklin & Bash | Marcel Ziff | Episode: "The Curse of Hor-Aha" |
| 2014–2022 | Black-ish | Mr. Stevens / Doctor White / Kimble | 165 episodes Nominated – Screen Actors Guild Award for Outstanding Performance by an Ensemble in a Comedy Series |
| 2015 | 2 Broke Girls | Devon | Episode: "And the Great Unwashed" |
| 2015 | Murder in the First | Sherman Brown | Episode: "Blue on Blue" |
| 2015 | Masters of Sex | Leslie H. Farber | Episode: "Masters of Gravity" |
| 2015 | Supergirl | Dirk Armstrong | Episode: "Hostile Takeover" |
| 2015–2017 | Grace and Frankie | Peter Warren | 2 episodes |
| 2016 | The Fighter & the Kid 3D | Dr. Rouse | Episode: "Therapy" |
| 2016 | Aquarius | Sean Boyle | Episode: "Revolution 9" |
| 2018 | So Close | Dr. Salinger | Television film |
| 2021 | Your Honor | Calvin Bloom | Episode: "Part Seven" |
| 2021 | Them | Mr. Stoat | Episode: "Day 6" |
| 2021 | Nine Perfect Strangers | Marty | Episode: "Random Acts of Mayhem" |
