= Jeff Meacham =

American actor

- Born: April 4, 1979 (age 47); Manchester, Connecticut, U.S.
- Occupation: Actor
- Notable work: Black-ish; The Thundermans
- Spouse: Christy Meyers
- Children: 2

Jeff Meacham (born April 4, 1979) is an American actor best known for his roles in the television comedy series Black-ish and The Thundermans.

== Early life ==
Meacham attended Booker High School in Sarasota, Florida.

== Career ==
After graduating from Booker's performing arts school in 1997, Meacham played a variety of minor roles in productions including Guiding Light and Ugly Betty. In 2006, Meacham was featured in an internet-only ad campaign for a shaving system. After the commercial, in which he played the "Shave Everywhere Guy", went viral, Meacham began to receive interest from agents. Most notably, Meacham has been featured in the role of Josh Oppenhol in the comedy Black-ish, and a recurring role as Principal Tad Bradford in the Nickelodeon series The Thundermans In addition, Meacham has played the role of Fred Flaterman on Resident Advisors.

In 2018, Meacham was nominated for the Screen Actors Guild Award for Outstanding Performance by an Ensemble in a Comedy Series. Meacham graduated from Purchase College's Acting Conservatory in 2001.

Meacham advocates for paid family leave and affordable childcare through Make it Work.

Meachum would later reprise his role of Principal Bradford in The Thundermans Return and The Thundermans: Undercover.

== Personal life ==
Meacham is married to actress Christy Meyers.

== Filmography ==
=== Film ===
Year	Title	Role	Notes
2004	Greydog	Undercover Cop 1	
2012	Ready or Not	Clark	
2013	Bounty Killer	Greg Gunney	
2014	Love & Mercy	Tony Asher	
2015	It's Us	Agent	
2018	Public Disturbance	Mike Ryder	
2019	Malibu Rescue	Roger	
2020	I Will Make You Mine	Jeff	
2020	Malibu Rescue: The Next Wave	Roger Gossard	
2022	Gatlopp	80's Aerobic Announcer	
2024	The Thundermans Return	Principal Bradford	
TBA	Nutmeg & Mistletoe †	TBA	Post-production

=== Television ===
Year	Title	Role	Notes
2007	Ugly Betty	Kevin	Episode: "Punch Out"
2007	How I Met Your Mother	DJ	Episode: "Something Blue"
2007	It's Always Sunny in Philadelphia	Robert	Episode: "The Gang Dances Their Asses Off"
2010	Big Love	Larry Spady	Episode: "Sins of the Father"
2010	I'm in the Band	Larry	Episode: "Last Weasel Standing"
2011	Friends with Benefits	Dennis	Episode: "The Benefit of Avoiding the Mindbanger"
2013–2018	The Thundermans	Principal Tad Bradford	19 episodes
2014–2022	Black-ish	Josh Oppenhol / Klark	155 episodes
2015	Resident Advisors	Fred Fladerman	Episode: "The Fire"
2017	Successful People	Dr. Fitzgerald	Episode: "Successful People Keep Their Eyes on the Prize"
2017	Nickelodeon's Not So Valentine's Special	Saint Valentine	Television special
2018	Fuller House	Ron	Episode: "A Sense of Purpose"
2019	Teachers	Paul	Episode: "Relationslut"
2020	Malibu Rescue	Roger Gossard	Episode: "Every Rose Has Its Thornton"
2019	Dollface	Rodney	Episode: "F*** Buddy"
2019	These Streets Don't Love You Like I Do!	Travis Madison	12 episodes
2020	Team Kaylie	Felix	Episode: "Purr-fect Harmony"
2020	Grown-ish	Josh	Episode: "Real Life S**t"
2021	Acapulco	David	Episode: "Crazy Little Thing Called Love"
2021	American Auto	Brent	Episode: "White Van"
2024	The Thundermans Return	Principal Tad Bradford	Television film
2025	The Thundermans: Undercover	Principal Tad Bradford	Episode: "Prank You, Next"
2025–present	Vampirina: Teenage Vampire	Boris Hauntley	Recurring role
