= Jason Orley =

American filmmaker

Jason Orley is an American filmmaker. He has directed stand-up specials like 2024 Pete Davidson: Turbo Fonzarelli, 2022's Pete Davidson Presents: The Best Friends, series such as 2023's Bupkis, and films like 2022's I Want You Back, and 2019's Big Time Adolescence.

== Early life and education ==
Orley grew up in Michigan, the youngest of three boys. His grandfather was David Hermelin, former Ambassador to Norway and a Detroit philanthropist. He cites Lahser High School as where he got his film school education. He attended New York University's Summer High School Program and went to NYU for college.

== Career ==
Orley spent the earlier part of his career as an assistant in broadcasting, and worked on writing scripts in his spare time. In 2009, he was Nancy Meyers assistant when she was working on the film, It's Complicated. He also worked as an assisant to Jason Winer, the dirdctor of the series Modern Family. In 2014 Meyers cast her former assistant in The Intern.

Orley made his directorial debut with Big Time Adolescence. It premiered at Sundance Film Festival on January 28, 2019, had a limited theatre run, and then began streaming on Hulu on March 20, 2020. Orley wrote the script when he was 23 years old and it landed on the Blacklist 2014. He told The Hollywood Reporter that he “always wanted to tell a story like this about male friendship, about teenage boys and how they grow up and how they always tend to idolize the wrong people.” It starred Pete Davidson, Griffin Gluck, Emily Arlook, Colson Baker, Sydney Sweeney and Jon Cryer. He told Vanity Fair that he “wrote this script as a young, single guy living in a guest house, and now I'm married with a daughter.”

In 2021, it was reported that Davidson and Orley were adapting the memoir I Slept with Joey Ramone, by Mickey Leigh, into a biopic. Orley was slated to direct and Davidson was to portray Joey Ramone. In 2024, Variety reported that the film was on hold.

Orley directed I Want You Back and it was released on Amazon Prime Video on February 11, 2022. It stars Charlie Day, Jenny Slate, Gina Rodriguez, Scott Eastwood, Manny Jacinto, Clark Backo and Luke David Blumm. It was written by Isaac Aptaker and Elizabeth Berger.

Bupkis premiered on Peacock on May 4, 2023. It starred Pete Davidson, Edie Falco and Joe Pesci with guest stars Brad Garrett, John Mulaney, Sebastian Stan, Colson Baker, Steve Buscemi, Bobby Cannavale, Charlie Day, Al Gore, Paul Walter Hauser, Chase Sui Wonders, and Ray Romano.

Orley has directed several of Pete Davidson's stand-up specials: 2024's Pete Davidson: Turbo Fonzarelli, Pete Davidson Presents: The Best Friends in 2022, and Pete Davidson: Alive From New York in 2020. All three streamed on Netflix.
