= List of Fox Searchlight Pictures films (1995–1999) =

This is a list of films produced by the American film studio Fox Searchlight Pictures (now Searchlight Pictures) from 1995 to 1999.

Release date	Title	Notes
August 11, 1995	The Brothers McMullen	North American and select international distribution only Grand Jury Prize Dramatic (tied with The Young Poisoner's Handbook)
March 22, 1996	Girl 6	
June 14, 1996	Stealing Beauty	distribution in North America, the U.K., Ireland, Australia, New Zealand and South Africa only Nominated - Palme d'Or; Nominated - David di Donatello for Best Film
August 23, 1996	She's the One	
October 11, 1996	Looking for Richard	
November 8, 1996	The Secret Agent	limited release in New York City and Los Angeles distribution in North America, the U.K., Ireland, Australia, New Zealand and South Africa only
February 21, 1997	Blood and Wine	distribution in North America, the U.K., Ireland, Australia, New Zealand and South Africa only
February 28, 1997	Smilla's Sense of Snow	North American, U.K., Irish, Australian and New Zealand distribution only Nominated - Golden Bear
March 28, 1997	Love and Other Catastrophes	North American, U.K., Irish and French distribution only
April 11, 1997	Paradise Road	distribution outside Australia and New Zealand only
May 16, 1997	The Van	distribution outside U.K. television and continental Europe only Nominated - Palme d'Or
June 6, 1997	Intimate Relations	
July 25, 1997	Star Maps	distribution only
August 15, 1997	The Full Monty	co-production with Channel Four Films and Redwave Films; BAFTA Award for Best Film; Bodil Award for Best Non-American Film; European Film Award for Best Film; Nominated - Academy Award for Best Picture; Nominated - BAFTA Award for Outstanding British Film; Nominated - Critics' Choice Movie Award for Best Picture; Nominated - Golden Globe Award for Best Motion Picture - Musical or Comedy
October 10, 1997	Nil By Mouth	U.K. and Irish distribution only; produced by EuropaCorp and SE8 GROUP; BAFTA Award for Outstanding British Film; Nominated - Palme d'Or
October 31, 1997	The Ice Storm	North American distribution only Bodil Award for Best American Film; Nominated - Palme d'Or
December 31, 1997	Oscar and Lucinda	
April 24, 1998	Two Girls and a Guy	
May 1, 1998	Shooting Fish (Note: Currently owned by Westside Pictures, with Magnolia Pictures handling US distribution)	North American distribution only
June 12, 1998	Cousin Bette	
July 17, 1998	Polish Wedding	North American, U.K., Irish, Australian and New Zealand distribution only; produced by Lakeshore Entertainment
August 14, 1998	Slums of Beverly Hills	
October 2, 1998	The Impostors	
November 20, 1998	Waking Ned Devine	North and South American, U.K. and Irish distribution only Nominated - Satellite Award for Best Film - Musical or Comedy
February 26, 1999	20 Dates	distribution in North America, the U.K., Ireland, Australia, New Zealand and South Africa only
March 26, 1999	Among Giants	distribution in North America, the U.K., Ireland, Australia, New Zealand and South Africa only
April 30, 1999	A Midsummer Night's Dream	distribution in all media excluding international television outside Italy only; co-production with Regency Enterprises
September 10, 1999	Best Laid Plans	
September 10, 1999	Whiteboyz	distribution outside France and select Asian and Central European territories only
October 8, 1999	Boys Don't Cry	distribution only Inducted into the National Film Registry in 2019; GLAAD Media Award for Outstanding Film - Limited Release; Nominated - Satellite Award for Best Film - Drama
October 29, 1999	Dreaming of Joseph Lees	
December 24, 1999	Titus	North American distribution only
