= Happy Place (film) =

2020 Canadian drama film

- Directed by: Helen Shaver
- Written by: Pamela Mala Sinha
- Produced by: Elise Cousineau; Andrew Nicholas; McCann Smith; Jennifer Kawaja; Julia Sereny
- Starring: Clark Backo; Sheila McCarthy; Liisa Repo-Martell; Mary Walsh
- Cinematography: Jackson Parrell
- Edited by: Simone Smith; Tad Seaborn
- Music by: Justin Small; Ohad Benchetrit
- Production company: Sienna Films
- Distributed by: Pacific Northwest Pictures
- Release date: September 20, 2020 (Cinéfest)
- Running time: 87 minutes
- Country: Canada
- Language: English

Happy Place is a 2020 Canadian drama film, directed by Helen Shaver. An adaptation of the theatrical play by Pamela Mala Sinha, the film centres on a group of women residing at an inpatient mental health clinic after various personal crises.

The film's cast includes Sinha, Clark Backo, Marie-Eve Perron, Tara Rosling, Liisa Repo-Martell, Jennifer Wigmore, Sheila McCarthy and Mary Walsh. The film commenced production in September 2019 in the Parry Sound District, primarily at Lake Rosseau.

The film premiered on September 20, 2020 at the 2020 Cinéfest Sudbury International Film Festival, and subsequently screened at the 2020 Vancouver International Film Festival.

== Awards and nominations ==
Award	Date of ceremony	Category	Nominees	Result	Reference
Canadian Screen Awards	May 20, 2021	Best Supporting Actress	Mary Walsh	Won	
Canadian Screen Awards	May 20, 2021	Best Costume Design	Bernadette Croft	Nominated	
Canadian Screen Awards	May 20, 2021	Best Hair	Ashley Nay	Nominated	
