= Emily Arlook =

American actress (born 1990)

- Born: Emily Taryn Arlook; July 24, 1990 (age 35); Los Angeles, California, U.S.
- Occupation: Actress
- Years active: 1998–present
- Partner: Will McCormack (engaged)
- Children: 2
- Father: Richard Arlook

Emily Taryn Arlook (born July 24, 1990) is an American actress. She is best known for her role as Nomi Segal on the Freeform comedy drama Grown-ish (2018–2024), Kate Harris in Big Time Adolescence (2019), and Kim Glassman in You People (2023).

== Early life ==
Emily Taryn Arlook was born on July 24, 1990, in Los Angeles, California. She is the daughter of Deborah "Debe" Arlook, a photographer, and Richard Arlook, a talent manager and film producer. She is Jewish.

== Career ==
Arlook's debut acting role was in the 1998 mockumentary film 20 Dates, playing a fictional character of herself. Her sister Rachel Arlook, and her father Richard Arlook also star in the film as fictional character of themselves.

In 2018, Arlook joined the main cast of the Freeform teen comedy drama series, Grown-ish as Nomi Segal. The series is a spin-off of the ABC sitcom Black-ish, and Arlook starred in seasons 1–4, known as the "Zoey Johnson years", and guest starred in season 5–6. In 2019, Arlook starred as Kate Harris in the Hulu coming-of-age comedy film Big Time Adolescence, starring Pete Davidson, Colson Baker, Sydney Sweeney, and Jon Cryer.

In 2023, Arlook starred as Kim Glassman in the Netflix romantic comedy film You People, directed by Kenya Barris and written by Barris and Jonah Hill. In 2024, Arlook joined the romantic comedy series Nobody Wants This, as Rebecca, which premiered on Netflix in September 2024.

== Personal life ==
As of 2018, Arlook is engaged to actor and filmmaker Will McCormack. They have two children together. Arlook is a Jewish Buddhist.

== Filmography ==
=== Film ===
Year	Title	Role	Notes
1998	20 Dates	Emily	
2002	Wishcraft	Hannah Bumpers	
2008	Just Add Water	Candy	
2010	Valentine's Day	Skater Girl	Uncredited
2019	Big Time Adolescence	Kate Harris	
2023	You People	Kim Glassman	

=== Television ===
Year	Title	Role	Notes
2014	A to Z	Key	Episode: "G Is for Geronimo"
2015	The Grinder	Laura Springer	Episode: "Buckingham Malice"
2016	Mary + Jane	Auden	Episode: "Noachella"
2016	The Good Place	Dana	2 episodes
2016	Hand of God	Ariella Kretzmer	2 episodes
2018–2024	Grown-ish	Nomi Segal	Main role (seasons 1–4); guest role (seasons 5–6)
2022	Beavis and Butt-Head	Abby; Ava (voice)	2 episodes
2024–2025	Nobody Wants This	Rebecca	Recurring role
