= List of Grown-ish episodes =

Grown-ish is an American sitcom series and a spin-off of the ABC series Black-ish. The single-camera comedy follows the children of the Johnson family (from Black-ish) as they go to college and begin their journeys to adulthood, only to quickly discover that not everything goes their way once they leave the nest; the first four seasons follow eldest daughter Zoey (Yara Shahidi) as she attends college, while the fifth season onward follows eldest son, former college dropout and Zoey's younger brother Junior (Marcus Scribner) as he also attends college after Zoey's graduation. The series premiered on January 3, 2018, on Freeform.

In January 2020, the series was renewed for a fourth season, while the second half of the third season premiered on January 21, 2021. The fourth season premiered on July 8, 2021. The second half of the fourth season premiered on January 27, 2022. In March 2022, Freeform renewed the series for a fifth season which premiered on July 20, 2022. In January 2023, the series was renewed for a sixth season. In March 2023, it was reported that the sixth season is going to be its final season. The sixth and final season premiered on June 28, 2023.

During the course of the series, 105 episodes of Grown-ish aired over six seasons, between January 3, 2018, and May 22, 2024.

== Series overview ==
| Season | Episodes | | Originally released | | |
| Season | Episodes | | First released | Last released | Network |
|---|---|---|---|---|---|
| Backdoor pilot | | | May 3, 2017 | | ABC |
| 1 | 13 | | January 3, 2018 | March 28, 2018 | Freeform |
| 2 | 21 | 11 | January 2, 2019 | March 6, 2019 | Freeform |
| 2 | 21 | 10 | June 5, 2019 | August 7, 2019 | Freeform |
| 3 | 17 | 8 | January 16, 2020 | March 5, 2020 | Freeform |
| 3 | 17 | 9 | January 21, 2021 | March 18, 2021 | Freeform |
| 4 | 18 | 9 | July 8, 2021 | September 2, 2021 | Freeform |
| 4 | 18 | 9 | January 27, 2022 | March 24, 2022 | Freeform |
| 5 | 18 | 9 | July 20, 2022 | September 14, 2022 | Freeform |
| 5 | 18 | 9 | January 18, 2023 | March 15, 2023 | Freeform |
| 6 | 18 | 9 | June 28, 2023 | August 23, 2023 | Freeform |
| 6 | 18 | 9 | March 27, 2024 | May 22, 2024 | Freeform |

== Episodes ==
=== Backdoor pilot (2017) ===
| No. overall | No. in season | Title | Directed by | Written by | Original release date | Prod. code | U.S. viewers (millions) |
|---|---|---|---|---|---|---|---|
| 71 | 23 | "Liberal Arts" | James Griffiths | Kenya Barris & Larry Wilmore | May 3, 2017 | 323 | 4.17 |
Zoey arrives at Cal-U for a two-day orientation and quickly adjusts to college life, but her excitement is short-lived when she discovers that Dre never turned in her housing application and is forced to pay a visit to President Schock and Dean Parker to beg mercy in order to save her spot for next year.

=== Season 1 (2018) ===
| No. overall | No. in season | Title | Directed by | Written by | Original release date | U.S. viewers (millions) |
|---|---|---|---|---|---|---|
| 1 | 1 | "Late Registration" | Kevin Bray | Story by : Kenya Barris & Jenifer Rice-Genzuk Henry; Teleplay by : Jenifer Rice-Genzuk Henry | January 3, 2018 | 0.95 |
Thinking she will rule Cal-U like how she ruled high school, Zoey Johnson quickly learns she has a lot of growing up to do.
| 2 | 2 | "Bitch, Don't Kill My Vibe" | Stella Meghie | Jordan Reddout & Gus Hickey | January 3, 2018 | 0.92 |
Zoey begins to experience FOMO when she tries to juggle school work, clubs, and parties.
| 3 | 3 | "If You're Reading This, It's Too Late" | Steven Caple Jr. | Hale Rothstein | January 10, 2018 | 0.66 |
Zoey is elated when it seems her crush has feelings for her, but begins to worry he may see things differently when she receives a late night "U up?" text.
| 4 | 4 | "Starboy" | John Fortenberry | Elaine Welteroth & Chad Sanders | January 17, 2018 | 0.90 |
Zoey makes a deal with Dean Parker to tutor a star basketball player, hoping to get a letter of recommendation, but her friends believe the relationship is something more.
| 5 | 5 | "C.R.E.A.M. (Cash Rules Everything Around Me)" | Pete Chatmon | Craig Doyle | January 24, 2018 | 0.64 |
When Cash makes a serious mistake on social media, it falls back on Zoey and makes her change her image.
| 6 | 6 | "Cashin' Out" | Todd Biermann | Chris Spencer | January 31, 2018 | 0.61 |
Zoey faces a difficult decision that may change her future after she gets put on the spot on national television.
| 7 | 7 | "Un-Break My Heart" | Steven Tsuchida | Kara Brown | February 7, 2018 | 0.54 |
After going through a traumatic breakup, Zoey begins partying as a means of escape. A power outage on campus forces Zoey to stay in for the night and confront her true feelings to begin the healing process.
| 8 | 8 | "Erase Your Social" | Amy York Rubin | Vanessa McGee | February 14, 2018 | 0.48 |
Zoey manages to gain a coveted fellowship at Teen Vogue magazine. But she gives too much of her personal life away on social media, jeopardising her position.
| 9 | 9 | "Who Gon Stop Me" | Eric Dean Seaton | Melanie Kirschbaum & Alexandra Decas | February 28, 2018 | 0.52 |
After a local drug dealer gets shot on campus, Zoey begins worry about Vivek when he gets pulled into the intense underground world.
| 10 | 10 | "It's Hard Out Here for a Pimp" | Marta Cunningham | Hale Rothstein & Jenifer Rice-Genzuk Henry | March 7, 2018 | 0.44 |
Jazz and Sky struggle to hit a dating stride in a college landscape, and Zoey and Luca attempt to buckle down to complete a project.
| 11 | 11 | "Safe and Sound" | Silver Tree | Helen Krieger & Emily Miller | March 14, 2018 | 0.47 |
Zoey and her friends protest when Cal U wants to close down Hawkins Hall, as they see it as their `safe space'.
| 12 | 12 | "Crew Love" | Pete Chatmon | Hale Rothstein & Jenifer Rice-Genzuk Henry | March 21, 2018 | 0.43 |
When the freshman formal rolls around, Zoey, Aaron and confront their issues with modern-day relationships; Jazz revels in a new relationship; a game of "Never Have I Ever" makes Ana reach a sobering realization.
| 13 | 13 | "Back & Forth" | Steven Caple Jr. | Isaac Schamis & Danny Segal | March 28, 2018 | 0.40 |
When her freshman year comes to an end, Zoey faces an important decision about her love life and everyone appears to have an opinion about it, offering her their advice.

=== Season 2 (2019) ===
| No. overall | No. in season | Title | Directed by | Written by | Original release date | U.S. viewers (millions) |
|---|---|---|---|---|---|---|
Part 1
| 14 | 1 | "Better" | Pete Chatmon | Melanie Kirschbaum & Alexandra Decas | January 2, 2019 | 0.67 |
Zoey and the gang return to Cal-U for their Sophomore year and move into a less than stellar apartment and throw a party to coerce their friends to help clean it up.
| 15 | 2 | "Nothing Was The Same" | Pete Chatmon | Vanessa McGee | January 2, 2019 | 0.56 |
Zoey and Luca try to focus on their relationship issue. While Aaron and Ana grow closer as friends.
| 16 | 3 | "New Rules" | Sam Bailey | Lisa McQuillan | January 9, 2019 | 0.39 |
Zoey struggles to make amends after accidentally breaking one of the group's unspoken social rules and offending both Jazz and Luca. After Aaron and Vivek's kickback is shut down, they try to find another way to make sure they can still throw turned up parties.
| 17 | 4 | "In My Feelings" | Sam Bailey | Crystal Jenkins | January 16, 2019 | 0.64 |
While waiting for the mysterious drop of a modern-day musical genius, the gang debates what really makes a person "genius." When Nomi assigns Luca the label of "genius" Zoey takes it personally.
| 18 | 5 | "Girls Like You" | Todd Biermann | Hailey Chavez | January 23, 2019 | 0.47 |
When Nomi's endless string of one night stands starts to throw off the apartment dynamic, Zoey and Ana confront her. Aaron encourages Ana to let loose for a night and her friends all agreed to check off an item from their bucket list.
| 19 | 6 | "Love Galore" | Todd Biermann | Wade Allain-Marcus | January 30, 2019 | 0.60 |
When Luca faces an exciting, high-pressure assignment for his design class, Zoey starts to wonder if she made a mistake in dropping it. Jazz and Sky debate with Aaron and Vivek if good branding trumps ability.
| 20 | 7 | "Messy" | Linda Mendoza | Richard Brandon Manus | February 6, 2019 | 0.45 |
Following a series of miscommunications that result in Zoey's ex-boyfriend, Cash, being accused of sexual assault, Cal-U implements a new policy that divides the crew.
| 21 | 8 | "Workin' Me" | Linda Mendoza | Ritza Bloom | February 13, 2019 | 0.35 |
Zoey decides to give styling a try and offers to help the twins revamp their image. Knowing that sex sells, Jazz wants to play up her sexuality, sparking a conversation about image and empowerment.
| 22 | 9 | "Body Count" | Jude Weng | Melanie Kirschbaum & Alexandra Decas | February 20, 2019 | 0.42 |
The gang attends the Cal U Arts Fair and tests different boundaries in their relationships. Zoey sees Luca's exhibit and it sends her into a spiral of wanting to know more about his past. Nomi checks out the LGBTQIA+ tent.
| 23 | 10 | "Wild'n Cuz I'm Young" | Jude Weng | Vanessa McGee | February 27, 2019 | 0.31 |
After partying all night at the college's biggest end of semester party, Zoe commits a devastating act to help her in her midterms.
| 24 | 11 | "Face the World" | Eric Dean Seaton | Jenifer Rice-Genzuk Henry | March 6, 2019 | 0.49 |
After facing the consequences of academic dishonesty, Zoey tries to stop Dre and Pops from coming to the parents weekend.
Part 2
| 25 | 12 | "Fake Love" | Stella Meghie | Craig Doyle | June 5, 2019 | 0.55 |
Felt like she hit rock bottom after being cut financially by her dad, and getting caught cheating on her exams, Zoey learns another bombshell that causes a huge rift between her and a friend.
| 26 | 13 | "You Decide" | Pete Chatmon | Crystal Jenkins | June 12, 2019 | 0.51 |
To mask her true emotions, Zoey recruits her brother Junior to be her wingman at Titanium for a fun night out, ignoring the drama that is taking place around her; Nomi debates giving Paige another chance
| 27 | 14 | "Can't Knock the Hustle" | Pete Chatmon | Sara Lukasiewicz & Brady Morphy | June 19, 2019 | 0.57 |
After getting her car towed, Zoey's friends encourage her to get a job, but she struggles to find something that vibes with her career goals; Ana and Aaron consider attempting the "Shield Challenge".
| 28 | 15 | "Tweakin'" | Nick Wong | Wade Allain-Marcus | June 26, 2019 | 0.40 |
Ana and Aaron struggle to define what they each want out of their relationship; Doug and Vivek are convinced that Aaron is boo'd up; Zoey tries getting "Luca Jae Hall"-level high, but winds up overdoing it.
| 29 | 16 | "Self Care" | Amy Coughlin | Lisa McQuillan | July 3, 2019 | 0.47 |
For the holiday weekend, and knowing her family is going out of town, Zoey and her girls head to the Johnson family home in Sherman Oaks for a weekend of self-care and detoxing...but Zoey soon learns that her idea of relaxation may not align with what they all really need. Aaron reconnects with his passion for activism and hosts a fundraiser for his community.
| 30 | 17 | "Strictly 4 My..." | Amy Coughlin | Jenifer Rice-Genzuk Henry | July 10, 2019 | 0.43 |
Vivek gets a little too comfortable at Hawkins, sparking a heated debate over whether he has crossed the line into cultural appropriation; Zoey does a service project to style a high school student for her prom.
| 31 | 18 | "Nice for What" | Molly McGlynn | Emily G. Miller | July 17, 2019 | 0.39 |
Zoey, Ana and Nomi realize that they've been too nice to their significant others at their own expenses. They each take a small stand for their own happiness, resulting in some changes to their relationships.
| 32 | 19 | "Only Human" | Molly McGlynn | Richard Brandon Manus | July 24, 2019 | 0.43 |
When Aaron learns that one of his residents was possibly contemplating suicide, he decides to bring awareness to black mental health on campus; with "Fundie Run" on the horizon, Jazz and Sky let the competition get the best of them.
| 33 | 20 | "Mind Playing Tricks on Me" | Kabir Akhtar | Julie Bean | July 31, 2019 | 0.44 |
Aaron hosts an elegant fundraiser for his new "Black Minds Matter" cause, bringing everyone together for a night to remember. The gang is excited to meet the event's special guest, especially Luca, and Zoey makes sure to do everything to get him the face time he wants. Sky is feeling overwhelmed by Jazz and Doug's over-attentiveness.
| 34 | 21 | "Dreams and Nightmares" | Kabir Akhtar | Jenifer Rice-Genzuk Henry | August 7, 2019 | 0.42 |
With their Sophomore year coming to an end, bottled-up emotions start to unravel, causing rifts in friendships and relationships, and some interesting reconciliations.

=== Season 3 (2020–21) ===
The second half of this season was delayed by a year due to the COVID-19 pandemic

| No. overall | No. in season | Title | Directed by | Written by | Original release date | U.S. viewers (millions) |
|---|---|---|---|---|---|---|
Part 1
| 35 | 1 | "Crunch Time" | Todd Biermann | Melanie Kirschbaum & Alexandra Decas | January 16, 2020 | 0.48 |
Returning to Cal U for their junior year, the gang throws a homecoming party to kick off the new year; Zoey returns from her summer abroad and realizes that she has to quickly confront her feelings for Aaron and Luca.
| 36 | 2 | "Damn" | Todd Biermann | Crystal Jenkins | January 23, 2020 | 0.34 |
The crew tries to cope with a new development, but another bombshell sends Zoey into frenzy.
| 37 | 3 | "Close Friends" | Linda Mendoza | Lisa McQuillan | January 30, 2020 | 0.46 |
Nomi challenges Zoey to try to be friends with Luca after their breakup; Zoey is forced to consider if it's possible to be friends with an ex; Jazz and Doug help Vivek navigate the world of dating apps.
| 38 | 4 | "Thinkin Bout You" | Linda Mendoza | Wade Allain-Marcus | February 6, 2020 | 0.36 |
Luca sends off a confusing text to Zoey that has both of them spinning. Meanwhile, Ana leads the girls around campus on a "dorm storm" voter registration drive. Aaron reels after learning about his massive student loan debt.
| 39 | 5 | "Gut Feeling" | Natalia Anderson | Craig Doyle | February 13, 2020 | 0.32 |
Trying to get used to a pregnant girl in the house, the gang decide to throw Nomi a baby shower, which makes her come to a sobering realization.
| 40 | 6 | "Real Life S**t" | Chris Robinson | Des Moran | February 20, 2020 | 0.29 |
Arraon student loans come to a head.
| 41 | 7 | "Doin' The Most" | Chris Robinson | Nyesha Littlejohn & Molly A.H. Mitchell | February 27, 2020 | 0.25 |
Zoey struggles with school and her new job.
| 42 | 8 | "Age Ain't Nothing But a Number" | Sam Bailey | Jenifer Rice-Genzuk Henry | March 5, 2020 | 0.31 |
In the one hour Spring finale, Zoey makes a big decision on her 21st birthday.
Part 2
| 43 | 9 | "Public Service Announcement" | Sam Bailey | Crystal Jenkins | January 21, 2021 | 0.43 |
2 months have passed after dropping out of Cal-U, Zoey dives into her dream job, while also balancing the demands of a work life and personal life.
| 44 | 10 | "Hard Place" | Eric Dean Seaton | Jonathan Curtiss & Will A. Miles | January 28, 2021 | 0.34 |
Ana learns something about Javi that upends her entire worldview as her friendship with him intensifies. Aaron is prompted to rekindle his activism origins after learning about Cal U's engagement in private prisons.
| 45 | 11 | "Alright" | Eric Dean Seaton | Lisa McQuillan | February 4, 2021 | 0.24 |
Aaron is offered an opportunity to be featured in a nationally televised interview; he struggles to keep his message targeted; Zoey navigates her feelings for Aaron while helping him devise a new strategy.
| 46 | 12 | "Water on Water on Water" | Nick Wong | Wade Allain-Marcus | February 11, 2021 | 0.26 |
Ana gets baptized as she and Javi are tested for the first time in their relationship. Meanwhile, Zoey struggles at work under the mixed messages from her new client, Indigo.
| 47 | 13 | "No Halo" | Nick Wong | Craig Doyle | February 18, 2021 | 0.30 |
When Zoey returns home for a long weekend, she soon discovers that her friends are busy with Cal U's Field Day; meanwhile, Jazz and Doug's relationship gets complicated when Jazz returns from the NCAA track finals with very surprising news.
| 48 | 14 | "Know Yourself" | Jenifer Rice-Genzuk Henry | Jenifer Rice-Genzuk Henry & Des Moran | February 25, 2021 | 0.29 |
Vivek has a new experience with Heidi which causes Aaron and Doug to struggle with adjusting their views on sexuality and masculinity. Nomi and her new baby Luna return to Cal U. Junior shows up to fight for Sky.
| 49 | 15 | "Over My Head" | Nick Wong | Melanie Kirschbaum & Alexandra Decas | March 4, 2021 | 0.37 |
Zoey wonders if she's ready for the real world after she becomes the subject of a nasty rumor at work. Nomi debates whether to tell Phil about Luna. Doug plans a house party to cheer on Jazz and Sky in their Olympic-qualifying race.
| 50 | 16 | "All In Love Is Fair" | Amy Coughlin | Julie Bean | March 11, 2021 | 0.30 |
Zoey wrestles with the status of her new relationship with Aaron.
| 51 | 17 | "Who Do You Love?" | Amy Coughlin | Jenifer Rice-Genzuk Henry | March 18, 2021 | 0.32 |
Aaron uses his graduation ceremony to oppose the University's funding in private prisons, with the help of the senior class. Meanwhile, as Junior year comes to an end, Jazz and Doug make a decision with their relationship. Vivek's "business" suffers a major disaster that could ruin his future.

=== Season 4 (2021–22) ===
| No. overall | No. in season | Title | Directed by | Written by | Original release date | U.S. viewers (millions) |
|---|---|---|---|---|---|---|
Part 1
| 52 | 1 | "Ugh, those feels again" | Chris Robinson | Crystal Jenkins | July 8, 2021 | 0.26 |
Before starting their senior year, Zoey and her friends head down to Mexico for some summer fun, but discovered that there is still some unresolved drama that rises to the surface, and some new relationship hookups and even a surprise celebration.
| 53 | 2 | "Drunk in Love" | Chris Robinson | Lisa McQuillan | July 15, 2021 | 0.31 |
Still in Mexico, Aaron and Zoey have a serious heart to heart while in lock up. Doug and Luca continue their misadventure through Mexico with the two women. Ana decides if she still wants to have a relationship with Javi.
| 54 | 3 | "Demons" | Todd Biermann | Melanie Kirschbaum | July 22, 2021 | 0.27 |
5 months after Mexico, Zoey and her friends return to Cal-U for their last semester of senior year, Zoey must face an old enemy to secure an internship in order to graduate. Vivek learns his fate at Cal-U.
| 55 | 4 | "Daddy Lessons" | Todd Biermann | Alexandra Decas | July 29, 2021 | 0.27 |
After getting expelled, Vivek dreads to tell his parents. Meanwhile, after Dre finds out what happened in Mexico, he begins to question Zoey's identity.
| 56 | 5 | "A BOY IS A GUN*" | Jenifer Rice-Genzuk Henry | Des Moran | August 5, 2021 | 0.21 |
After a Black man is shot unarmed, it causes political tension to be spread all over Cal-U as the crew reacts differently to the news. Keila and Doug come at odds when she want to use party to raise awareness.
| 57 | 6 | "Put Your Hands Where My Eyes Could See" | Jenifer Rice-Genzuk Henry | Wade Allain-Marcus | August 12, 2021 | 0.24 |
Civil unrest has swept over Los Angeles in the form of violent protests as everyone strives for racial fairness and equality. Nomi confronts her White Fragility, as Ana and Javi's relationship reaches a breaking point.
| 58 | 7 | "A Peace Of Light" | Nick Wong | Henry "Hank" Jones | August 19, 2021 | 0.22 |
When Zoey's work is used by her boss, she contemplates staying silent or risking her internship. Jazz takes a medical leave from track. Aaron tries to make good impression.
| 59 | 8 | "Canceled" | Nick Wong | Sara Lukasiewicz & Brady Morphy | August 26, 2021 | 0.26 |
After being called out by Luca, Zoey tries to regain over cancel culture.
| 60 | 9 | "You Beat Me to the Punch" | Shiri Appleby | Jenifer Rice-Genzuk Henry | September 2, 2021 | 0.24 |
In the summer finale, Zoey accepts Luca's career advice, making Aaron uncomfortable. Doug and Kiela navigate a roadblock in their relationship, while Vivek tries to help Nomi and Ana take their minds off the LSATs.
Part 2
| 61 | 10 | "It Was Good Until It Wasn't" | Todd Biermann | Crystal Jenkins | January 27, 2022 | 0.15 |
The gang tries to recover following the fall out at the Laua party. As Aaron and Zoey's relationship is in limbo, Zoey begins to seek advice from someone close. Vivek and Ana decide to keep their night hidden. Doug and Kiela navigate their new relationship. Nomi struggles with a major dilemma that could upend her life.
| 62 | 11 | "Movin' Different" | Linda Mendoza | Lisa McQuillan | February 3, 2022 | 0.20 |
After surviving a almost fatal hit and run, Ana is faced with both a political and ethical dilemma, which forces her to seek advice from unlikely source. Doug and Kiela hit another obstacle in their relationship. After being hounded by a freshman student, Aaron decides to do something special for his midnight class.
| 63 | 12 | "Mr. Right Now" | Wade Allain-Marcus | Alexandra Decas | February 10, 2022 | 0.16 |
With her baby daddy back in her life, Nomi decides if she wants to include him in their daughter's life. Zoey tries to mend the friendship between Luca and Doug as an attempt to improve her internship experience.
| 64 | 13 | "OK Not To Be OK" | Todd Biermann | Melanie Kirschbaum | February 17, 2022 | 0.17 |
After a series of setbacks, Jazz resumes therapy. As Ana and Aaron reconnect as friends, it causes Zoey and Vivek spin out.
| 65 | 14 | "The Revolution Will Not Be Televised" | Shiri Appleby | Wade Allain-Marcus | February 24, 2022 | 0.12 |
Zoey and Luca are tense as they scramble to build a new line for Anti-Muse after a famous fashion collaborator wants to see it. Aaron is requested to give a presentation about his Afro Salon, but he is put in a difficult situation when Cal-U urges him to make changes. Ana and Nomi visit nearby law schools and run across an old friend.
| 66 | 15 | "Can't Let You Go" | Todd Biermann | Des Moran | March 3, 2022 | 0.16 |
Helping Jack and Diane for a school project, Zoey takes a lookback of her college memories, while also trying to figure out her working relationship with Luca. Tension between Kiela and Doug rise.
| 67 | 16 | "Live Your Life" | Linda Mendoza | Crystal Jenkins | March 10, 2022 | 0.13 |
When Vivek suffers a tragedy, it forces the crew to take a look at their own lives.
| 68 | 17 | "Laugh Now Cry Later" | Craig Doyle | Lisa McQuillan | March 17, 2022 | 0.16 |
Zoey and Aaron's new relationship in once again put to the test when she has to decide between a new job or following Aaron to Africa. Ana is usure what to do before starting law school. Doug begins to have feelings for Jazz again.
| 69 | 18 | "Empire State of Mind" | Todd Biermann | Jenifer Rice-Genzuk Henry | March 24, 2022 | 0.19 |
After 4 unforgettable years at Cal-U, Zoey and her friends celebrate their past 4 years together in a celebration filled with memories, love, hope and new beginnings before tossing the caps.

=== Season 5 (2022–23) ===
| No. overall | No. in season | Title | Directed by | Written by | Original release date | U.S. viewers (millions) |
|---|---|---|---|---|---|---|
Part 1
| 70 | 1 | "This Is What You Came For" | Todd Biermann | Zakiyyah Alexander | July 20, 2022 | 0.18 |
Zoey returns to CAL-U to help her young brother, Junior's first day, but soon realize that she may have missed her college days. After meeting his new classmates, Junior escape dorm life by attending Doug's white party.
| 71 | 2 | "High Society" | Shiri Appleby | Liz Elverenli | July 27, 2022 | 0.13 |
Tension begins to build between Junior and Annika when they join a secret society that's known to be controversial. Red flags begin to rise as Aaron begins to notice the school uses his pictures as a way to promote diversity.
| 72 | 3 | "No New Friends" | Linda Mendoza | Melanie Boysaw | August 3, 2022 | 0.10 |
Junior and his roommate, Zaara, butt heads, causing them to one-up each other in an attempt to prove who is the most chill; Annika surprises Aaron by turning in a TikTok instead of a paper.
| 73 | 4 | "Look What U Started" | Nick Wong | Taylor Blackburn | August 10, 2022 | 0.14 |
Eager to impress Gamma Psi Delta while pledging, Junior faces a moral dilemma when he books a controversial comic to perform at a fundraiser; Aaron struggles to fit in with his colleagues, and receives advice from Zoey about how to cope.
| 74 | 5 | "You Don't Know Me" | Talia Osteen | Jonathan Braylock | August 17, 2022 | 0.15 |
The girls enlist Junior's help to find their shady roommate, Lauryn, who has a habit of mysteriously disappearing; Junior wonders if Annika is starting to catch feelings for him; Aaron suspects that Doug isn't being honest with him.
| 75 | 6 | "Frat Rules" | Todd Biermann | Rochée Jeffrey | August 24, 2022 | 0.12 |
While pledging for Gamma Psi Delta, Junior and Zeke find their brotherhood put to the test when a night of challenges and a quest to prove their loyalty goes awry.
| 76 | 7 | "Love on the Brain" | Sean Frank | Esa Lewis | August 31, 2022 | 0.10 |
Doug throws a party at Bar None and invites the crew; Junior considers opening up to Annika; Kiela finds herself on RA duty; Zaara plays the field; Aaron tries to be a good wingman, putting his long-distance relationship to the test.
| 77 | 8 | "Certified Lover Boy" | Talia Osteen | Craig Doyle | September 7, 2022 | 0.13 |
Doug throws a party at Bar None and invites the crew; Junior considers opening up to Annika; Kiela finds herself on RA duty; Zaara plays the field; Aaron tries to be a good wingman, putting his long-distance relationship to the test.
| 78 | 9 | "It's A Vibe" | Gail Lerner | Chas Jackson | September 14, 2022 | 0.13 |
As his first semester comes to an end, Junior's fate as a Gamma is determined, as is his relationship status with Annika; Doug throws another big party, and some old friends drop in to help him celebrate.
Part 2
| 79 | 10 | "Fool's Paradise" | Craig Doyle | Zakiyyah Alexander | January 18, 2023 | 0.13 |
Mildred hired Susan as a child minder for her daughter. However, the minder will become so obsessed with her husband that she breaks the family
| 80 | 11 | "Money Trees" | Nick Wong | Melanie Boysaw | January 25, 2023 | 0.12 |
| 81 | 12 | "Big Drip" | E. Langston Craig | Rickey Larke | February 1, 2023 | 0.11 |
| 82 | 13 | "Addiction" | Toby Burge | Colleen Klinefelter | February 8, 2023 | 0.09 |
| 83 | 14 | "Happy Not Knowing" | Shiri Appleby | Joey Longstreet | February 15, 2023 | 0.09 |
| 84 | 15 | "The A Team" | Gail Lerner | Mariah Rochelle Smith | February 22, 2023 | 0.11 |
| 85 | 16 | "Mr. Morale" | Sean Frank | Zakiyyah Alexander | March 1, 2023 | 0.09 |
| 86 | 17 | "Cleaning Out My Closet" | Shiri Appleby | Lo Howard | March 8, 2023 | 0.10 |
| 87 | 18 | "Cash in Cash Out" | Todd Biermann | Liz Elverenli | March 15, 2023 | 0.12 |
When his freshman year comes to an end, Junior uses the Gammas' annual Last Chance Dance to tell Annika how he feels. Zoey suffers a major setback that threatens her entire career.

=== Season 6 (2023–24) ===
| No. overall | No. in season | Title | Directed by | Written by | Original release date | U.S. viewers (millions) |
|---|---|---|---|---|---|---|
Part 1
| 88 | 1 | "Shoot My Shot" | Molly McGlynn | Franklin Hardy | June 28, 2023 | 0.12 |
With freshmen year over, Andre and his friends decide to hit up a music festival before going home for the summer. While, at the festival, a series of events occur that forced the group to make serious changes before the new school year.
| 89 | 2 | "Reachin' 2 Much" | Shiri Appleby | Melanie Boysaw | July 5, 2023 | 0.05 |
Three months after the music festival, Sophomore year is in full swing as Andre and Annika finally reconnect after a long time away. Zoey stops into town.
| 90 | 3 | "Ain't Nothing Like the Real Thing" | Nick Wong | Steven White | July 12, 2023 | 0.12 |
| 91 | 4 | "Pretty Mess" | Shiri Appleby | Mariah Rochelle Smith | July 19, 2023 | 0.16 |
| 92 | 5 | "Right My Wrongs" | Eric Dean Seaton | Lo Howard | July 26, 2023 | 0.09 |
| 93 | 6 | "Savior Complex" | E. Langston Craig | Colleen Klinefelter | August 2, 2023 | 0.09 |
| 94 | 7 | "Toxic" | Linda Mendoza | Liz Elverenli | August 9, 2023 | 0.09 |
| 95 | 8 | "Family Feud" | Toby Burge | Rickey Larke | August 16, 2023 | 0.09 |
| 96 | 9 | "Let Go" | Linda Mendoza | Richard Brandon Manus | August 23, 2023 | 0.06 |
Part 2
| 97 | 10 | "Hussle & Motivate" | Shiri Appleby | Taylor Blackburn | March 27, 2024 | 0.05 |
| 98 | 11 | "Lost Ones" | Gail Lerner | Aman Adumer | April 3, 2024 | 0.10 |
| 99 | 12 | "Get Rich or Die Tryin'" | E. Langston Craig | Kyle Drew | April 10, 2024 | 0.10 |
| 100 | 13 | "California Love" | Craig Doyle | Marc Cunningham | April 17, 2024 | 0.12 |
| 101 | 14 | "3 Peat" | Ria Pavia | Esa Lewis | April 24, 2024 | 0.04 |
| 102 | 15 | "I Wish You Roses" | Lon Takiguchi | Melanie Boysaw | May 1, 2024 | 0.06 |
| 103 | 16 | "Hard Times" | Todd Biermann | Julia Wiener | May 8, 2024 | 0.05 |
| 104 | 17 | "What I Want" | Linda Mendoza | Liz Elverenli | May 15, 2024 | 0.08 |
| 105 | 18 | "Grown" | Todd Biermann | Esa Lewis | May 22, 2024 | 0.05 |

== Ratings ==
=== Season 1 ===
Viewership and ratings per episode of List of Grown-ish episodes
| No. | Title | Air date | Rating (18–49) | Viewers (millions) | DVR (18–49) | DVR viewers (millions) | Total (18–49) | Total viewers (millions) |
|---|---|---|---|---|---|---|---|---|
| 1 | "Late Registration" | January 3, 2018 | 0.4 | 0.95 | —N/a | —N/a | —N/a | —N/a |
| 2 | "Bitch, Don't Kill My Vibe" | January 3, 2018 | 0.4 | 0.92 | —N/a | —N/a | —N/a | —N/a |
| 3 | "If You're Reading This, It's Too Late" | January 10, 2018 | 0.3 | 0.66 | 0.4 | 0.66 | 0.7 | 1.33 |
| 4 | "Starboy" | January 17, 2018 | 0.4 | 0.90 | 0.3 | —N/a | 0.7 | —N/a |
| 5 | "C.R.E.A.M. (Cash Rules Everything Around Me)" | January 24, 2018 | 0.3 | 0.64 | 0.3 | 0.64 | 0.6 | 1.29 |
| 6 | "Cashin' Out" | January 31, 2018 | 0.3 | 0.61 | 0.3 | —N/a | 0.6 | —N/a |
| 7 | "Un-Break My Heart" | February 7, 2018 | 0.3 | 0.54 | 0.3 | 0.68 | 0.6 | 1.22 |
| 8 | "Erase Your Social" | February 14, 2018 | 0.2 | 0.48 | —N/a | —N/a | —N/a | —N/a |
| 9 | "Who Gon Stop Me" | February 28, 2018 | 0.2 | 0.52 | —N/a | —N/a | —N/a | —N/a |
| 10 | "It's Hard Out Here for a Pimp" | March 7, 2018 | 0.2 | 0.44 | 0.3 | 0.53 | 0.5 | 0.97 |
| 11 | "Safe and Sound" | March 14, 2018 | 0.2 | 0.47 | 0.3 | 0.55 | 0.5 | 1.02 |
| 12 | "Crew Love" | March 21, 2018 | 0.2 | 0.43 | —N/a | 0.53 | —N/a | 0.96 |
| 13 | "Back & Fourth" | March 28, 2018 | 0.2 | 0.40 | —N/a | 0.53 | —N/a | 0.93 |

=== Season 2 ===
Viewership and ratings per episode of List of Grown-ish episodes
| No. | Title | Air date | Rating (18–49) | Viewers (millions) | DVR (18–49) | DVR viewers (millions) | Total (18–49) | Total viewers (millions) |
|---|---|---|---|---|---|---|---|---|
| 1 | "Better" | January 2, 2019 | 0.3 | 0.67 | 0.2 | 0.45 | 0.5 | 1.12 |
| 2 | "Nothing Was The Same" | January 2, 2019 | 0.2 | 0.56 | 0.3 | 0.44 | 0.5 | 0.99 |
| 3 | "New Rules" | January 9, 2019 | 0.2 | 0.39 | 0.2 | 0.39 | 0.4 | 0.78 |
| 4 | "In My Feelings" | January 16, 2019 | 0.3 | 0.64 | 0.2 | 0.40 | 0.5 | 1.04 |
| 5 | "Girls Like You" | January 23, 2019 | 0.2 | 0.47 | 0.2 | 0.31 | 0.4 | 0.79 |
| 6 | "Love Galore" | January 30, 2019 | 0.3 | 0.60 | 0.1 | 0.22 | 0.4 | 0.84 |
| 7 | "Messy" | February 6, 2019 | 0.2 | 0.45 | 0.1 | 0.34 | 0.3 | 0.78 |
| 8 | "Workin' Me" | February 13, 2019 | 0.1 | 0.35 | 0.1 | 0.23 | 0.2 | 0.57 |
| 9 | "Body Count" | February 20, 2019 | 0.2 | 0.42 | 0.1 | 0.24 | 0.3 | 0.66 |
| 10 | "Wild'n Cuz I'm Young" | February 27, 2019 | 0.1 | 0.31 | 0.1 | 0.21 | 0.2 | 0.51 |
| 11 | "Face the World" | March 6, 2019 | 0.2 | 0.49 | 0.2 | 0.31 | 0.4 | 0.80 |
| 12 | "Fake Love" | June 5, 2019 | 0.2 | 0.55 | 0.2 | 0.35 | 0.4 | 0.90 |
| 13 | "You Decide" | June 12, 2019 | 0.2 | 0.51 | 0.1 | 0.27 | 0.3 | 0.78 |
| 14 | "Can't Knock the Hustle" | June 19, 2019 | 0.2 | 0.57 | 0.2 | 0.27 | 0.4 | 0.85 |
| 15 | "Tweakin'" | June 26, 2019 | 0.2 | 0.40 | —N/a | —N/a | —N/a | —N/a |
| 16 | "Self Care" | July 3, 2019 | 0.2 | 0.47 | 0.1 | 0.30 | 0.3 | 0.77 |
| 17 | "Strictly 4 My..." | July 10, 2019 | 0.2 | 0.43 | 0.1 | 0.27 | 0.3 | 0.70 |
| 18 | "Nice for What" | July 17, 2019 | 0.2 | 0.39 | 0.1 | 0.31 | 0.3 | 0.70 |
| 19 | "Only Human" | July 24, 2019 | 0.2 | 0.43 | 0.1 | 0.32 | 0.3 | 0.74 |
| 20 | "Mind Playing Tricks on Me" | July 31, 2019 | 0.2 | 0.44 | 0.1 | 0.25 | 0.3 | 0.69 |
| 21 | "Dreams and Nightmares" | August 7, 2019 | 0.2 | 0.42 | 0.1 | 0.18 | 0.3 | 0.60 |

=== Season 3 ===
Viewership and ratings per episode of List of Grown-ish episodes
| No. | Title | Air date | Rating (18–49) | Viewers (millions) | DVR (18–49) | DVR viewers (millions) | Total (18–49) | Total viewers (millions) |
|---|---|---|---|---|---|---|---|---|
| 1 | "Crunch Time" | January 16, 2020 | 0.2 | 0.48 | 0.1 | 0.27 | 0.3 | 0.75 |
| 2 | "Damn" | January 23, 2020 | 0.1 | 0.34 | 0.2 | 0.33 | 0.3 | 0.67 |
| 3 | "Close Friends" | January 30, 2020 | 0.2 | 0.46 | 0.1 | 0.25 | 0.3 | 0.71 |
| 4 | "Thinkin Bout You" | February 6, 2020 | 0.1 | 0.36 | 0.1 | 0.24 | 0.2 | 0.59 |
| 5 | "Gut Feeling" | February 13, 2020 | 0.1 | 0.32 | 0.2 | 0.26 | 0.3 | 0.58 |
| 6 | "Real Life S**t" | February 20, 2020 | 0.1 | 0.29 | 0.1 | 0.23 | 0.2 | 0.53 |
| 7 | "Doin' The Most" | February 27, 2020 | 0.1 | 0.25 | 0.2 | 0.32 | 0.3 | 0.57 |
| 8 | "Age Ain't Nothing But a Number" | March 5, 2020 | 0.1 | 0.31 | TBD | TBD | TBD | TBD |
| 9 | "Public Service Announcement" | January 21, 2021 | 0.2 | 0.43 | TBD | TBD | TBD | TBD |
| 10 | "Hard Place" | January 28, 2021 | 0.1 | 0.34 | TBD | TBD | TBD | TBD |
| 11 | "Alright" | February 4, 2021 | 0.1 | 0.24 | TBD | TBD | TBD | TBD |
| 12 | "Water on Water on Water" | February 11, 2021 | 0.1 | 0.26 | TBD | TBD | TBD | TBD |
| 13 | "No Halo" | February 18, 2021 | 0.1 | 0.30 | TBD | TBD | TBD | TBD |
| 14 | "Know Yourself" | February 25, 2021 | 0.1 | 0.29 | TBD | TBD | TBD | TBD |
| 15 | "Over My Head" | March 4, 2021 | 0.2 | 0.37 | TBD | TBD | TBD | TBD |
| 16 | "All In Love Is Fair" | March 11, 2021 | 0.1 | 0.30 | TBD | TBD | TBD | TBD |
| 17 | "Who Do You Love?" | March 18, 2021 | 0.1 | 0.32 | TBD | TBD | TBD | TBD |

=== Season 4 ===
Viewership and ratings per episode of List of Grown-ish episodes
| No. | Title | Air date | Rating (18–49) | Viewers (millions) | DVR (18–49) | DVR viewers (millions) | Total (18–49) | Total viewers (millions) |
|---|---|---|---|---|---|---|---|---|
| 1 | "Ugh, Those Feels Again" | July 8, 2021 | 0.1 | 0.26 | 0.1 | 0.18 | 0.2 | 0.44 |
| 2 | "Drunk in Love" | July 15, 2021 | 0.2 | 0.31 | 0.1 | 0.17 | 0.2 | 0.48 |
| 3 | "Demons" | July 22, 2021 | 0.1 | 0.27 | 0.1 | 0.16 | 0.2 | 0.43 |
| 4 | "Daddy Lessons" | July 29, 2021 | 0.1 | 0.27 | TBD | TBD | TBD | TBD |
| 5 | "A Boy is a Gun" | August 5, 2021 | 0.1 | 0.21 | TBD | TBD | TBD | TBD |
| 6 | "Put Your Hands Where My Eyes Could See" | August 12, 2021 | 0.1 | 0.24 | 0.1 | 0.16 | 0.2 | 0.40 |
| 7 | "A Piece of Light" | August 19, 2021 | 0.1 | 0.22 | 0.1 | 0.19 | 0.2 | 0.41 |
| 8 | "Canceled" | August 26, 2021 | 0.1 | 0.26 | TBD | TBD | TBD | TBD |
| 9 | "You Beat Me to the Punch" | September 2, 2021 | 0.1 | 0.24 | TBD | TBD | TBD | TBD |
| 10 | "It Was Good Until It Wasn't" | January 27, 2022 | 0.1 | 0.15 | TBD | TBD | TBD | TBD |
| 11 | "Movin' Different" | February 3, 2022 | 0.1 | 0.20 | TBD | TBD | TBD | TBD |
| 12 | "Mr. Right Now" | February 10, 2022 | 0.0 | 0.16 | TBD | TBD | TBD | TBD |
| 13 | "OK Not To Be OK" | February 17, 2022 | 0.1 | 0.17 | TBD | TBD | TBD | TBD |
| 14 | "The Revolution Will Not Be Televised" | February 24, 2022 | 0.0 | 0.12 | TBD | TBD | TBD | TBD |
| 15 | "Can't Let You Go" | March 3, 2022 | 0.1 | 0.16 | TBD | TBD | TBD | TBD |
| 16 | "Live Your Life" | March 10, 2022 | 0.0 | 0.13 | TBD | TBD | TBD | TBD |
| 17 | "Laugh Now Cry Later" | March 17, 2022 | 0.1 | 0.16 | TBD | TBD | TBD | TBD |
| 18 | "Empire State of Mind" | March 24, 2022 | 0.1 | 0.19 | TBD | TBD | TBD | TBD |

=== Season 5 ===
Viewership and ratings per episode of List of Grown-ish episodes
| No. | Title | Air date | Rating (18–49) | Viewers (millions) |
|---|---|---|---|---|
| 1 | "This Is What You Came For" | July 20, 2022 | 0.1 | 0.18 |
| 2 | "High Society" | July 27, 2022 | 0.1 | 0.13 |
| 3 | "No New Friends" | August 3, 2022 | 0.0 | 0.10 |
| 4 | "Look What U Started" | August 10, 2022 | 0.1 | 0.14 |
| 5 | "You Don't Know Me" | August 17, 2022 | 0.1 | 0.15 |
| 6 | "Frat Rules" | August 24, 2022 | 0.0 | 0.12 |
| 7 | "Love on the Brain" | August 31, 2022 | 0.0 | 0.10 |
| 8 | "Certified Lover Boy" | September 7, 2022 | 0.1 | 0.13 |
| 9 | "It's A Vibe" | September 14, 2022 | 0.1 | 0.13 |
| 10 | "Fool's Paradise" | January 18, 2023 | 0.1 | 0.13 |
| 11 | "Money Trees" | January 25, 2023 | 0.0 | 0.12 |
| 12 | "Big Drip" | February 1, 2023 | 0.0 | 0.11 |
| 13 | "Addiction" | February 8, 2023 | 0.1 | 0.09 |
| 14 | "Happy Not Knowing" | February 15, 2023 | 0.0 | 0.09 |
| 15 | "The A Team" | February 22, 2023 | 0.1 | 0.11 |
| 16 | "Mr. Morale" | March 1, 2023 | 0.0 | 0.09 |
| 17 | "Cleaning Out My Closet" | March 8, 2023 | 0.0 | 0.10 |
| 18 | "Cash in Cash Out" | March 15, 2023 | 0.1 | 0.12 |

=== Season 6 ===
Viewership and ratings per episode of List of Grown-ish episodes
| No. | Title | Air date | Rating (18–49) | Viewers (millions) |
|---|---|---|---|---|
| 1 | "Shoot My Shot" | June 28, 2023 | 0.1 | 0.12 |
| 2 | "Reachin' 2 Much" | July 5, 2023 | 0.0 | 0.05 |
| 3 | "Ain't Nothing Like the Real Thing" | July 12, 2023 | 0.1 | 0.12 |
| 4 | "Pretty Mess" | July 19, 2023 | 0.1 | 0.16 |
| 5 | "Right My Wrongs" | July 26, 2023 | 0.0 | 0.09 |
| 6 | "Savior Complex" | August 2, 2023 | 0.0 | 0.09 |
| 7 | "Toxic" | August 9, 2023 | 0.0 | 0.09 |
| 8 | "Family Feud" | August 16, 2023 | 0.0 | 0.09 |
| 9 | "Let Go" | August 23, 2023 | 0.0 | 0.06 |
| 10 | "Hussle & Motivate" | March 27, 2024 | 0.0 | 0.05 |
| 11 | "Lost Ones" | April 3, 2024 | 0.0 | 0.10 |
| 12 | "Get Rich or Die Tryin" | April 10, 2024 | 0.0 | 0.10 |
| 13 | "California Love" | April 17, 2024 | 0.0 | 0.12 |
| 14 | "3 Peat" | April 24, 2024 | 0.0 | 0.04 |
| 15 | "I Wish You Roses" | May 1, 2024 | 0.0 | 0.06 |
| 16 | "Hard Times" | May 8, 2024 | 0.0 | 0.05 |
| 17 | "What I Want" | May 15, 2024 | 0.0 | 0.08 |
| 18 | "Grown" | May 22, 2024 | 0.0 | 0.05 |
