= Along Came the Devil =

- Directed by: Jason DeVan
- Written by: Jason DeVan; Heather DeVan; Dylan Matlock
- Story by: Jason DeVan
- Produced by: Jason DeVan; Heather DeVan; Dylan Matlock
- Starring: Sydney Sweeney; Bruce Davison
- Cinematography: Justin Duval
- Edited by: Evan Ahlgren
- Music by: Kevin Coughlin; Chad Lanier
- Distributed by: Gravitas Ventures
- Release date: August 10, 2018
- Running time: 89 minutes
- Country: United States
- Language: English

Along Came the Devil is a 2018 American horror thriller drama film written by Jason DeVan, Heather DeVan and Dylan Matlock, directed by Jason DeVan and starring Sydney Sweeney and Bruce Davison.

== Plot ==
After a troubled childhood where her mother disappeared and she was abused by her father, Ashley returns to her hometown and moves in with her Aunt Tanya. Soon, Ashley begins experiencing strange paranormal occurrences and realizes she has been possessed by a demonic force. Ashley's childhood friend Hannah and a local pastor named John try to help her, but the demon proves powerful and difficult to exorcise. Reverend Michael, an expert in demonology, eventually gets involved in the fight to save Ashley's soul. However, the exorcism ritual is rushed and its ending is unclear - it's left ambiguous whether Ashley is ultimately delivered from the demon's grip or succumbs to it.

== Cast ==
- Sydney Sweeney as Ashley Winbourne
- Madison Lintz as Hannah
- Jessica Barth as Tanya Winbourne
- Bruce Davison as Reverend Michael
- Matt Dallas as Pastor John Douglas
- Heather DeVan as Sarah Winbourne
- Austin Filson as Shane Stevens
- Ahmed Lucan as Dr. Carraz
- PK DeVan as Dylan
- Kyla Deaver as Jordan
- Lia McHugh as Young Ashley
- Mark Ashworth as Dad
- Liz Godwin as Rosemary
- Patrick R. Walker as Bryce
- Donna Biscoe as Dr. Liles

== Release ==
The film was in theaters, On Demand and Digital HD on August 10, 2018.

== Reception ==
The film has a 38% rating on Rotten Tomatoes based on eight reviews. Adam Keller of Film Threat awarded the film five stars out of ten.

Dennis Harvey of Variety gave the film a negative review and wrote, "Either way, it creaks more than it creeps, to the extent that various scenes appear to be missing from director Jason DeVan’s disjointed debut."

Noel Murray of the Los Angeles Times gave the film a positive review and wrote, "But none of this really leads anywhere original. From the opening text to the closing credits, this movie keeps lurching impatiently ahead toward scenes that horror fans have seen before."
