= Dr. Squatch =

American personal care brand

- Dr. Squatch's current logo
- Industry: Personal care products
- Founded: 2013; 13 years ago in San Diego
- Headquarters: Los Angeles, United States
- Products: Bar soap; Deodorant; Perfume; Toothpaste
- Owner: Unilever
- Website: drsquatch.com

Dr. Squatch is an American personal care company selling products marketed towards men. The company was founded in 2013 in San Diego, and is now based in Los Angeles. Originally producing bar soap, the company has since added items like toothpaste, perfume and deodorant to its offerings.

Its products are marketed as "natural", and their branding relies on natural-sounding product names such as "Eucalyptus Greek Yogurt" and "Grapefruit IPA", based on an association with a natural ingredient. As of late 2021, its products were only sold online and by subscription, but sales have since been expanded to physical stores as well. The company is named after Sasquatch (Bigfoot), a mythical creature prevalent in popular culture.

== History ==
In 2016, Dr. Squatch used a Kickstarter campaign to generate funding. The company grew its visibility by targeting Generation Z on TikTok advertisements in 2021 before signing up for a Super Bowl commercial at that year's game. The advert featured "all white men" engaging in "manly things that men do", including a man opening a pickle jar and another having their hair braided by their daughter. Yardbarker criticized the advertisement as containing juvenile humor and "trying way too hard." As of 2021, the company's annual revenue was $100 million annually.

In 2023, Unilever cited Dr. Squatch among the companies that were a significant source of competition. Dr. Squatch and Unilever entered an intra-industry dispute resolution process initiated by the latter, triggered by the former's combative advertising practice of using the skull and crossbones symbol to accent the message that their products do not contain non-"natural" ingredients found in competitors' products. In late 2023, the National Advertising Division of the BBB National Programs made a determination that the practice should be discontinued, but that Dr. Squatch may keep labeling their products as having "no harmful ingredients".

The company received significant attention in late 2024 after an ad campaign featuring actress Sydney Sweeney as a "body wash genie." In June 2025, it was announced the company had been acquired by Unilever for $1.5 billion from Summit Partners. The deal remains subject to regulatory and shareholder approval. The transaction was completed on November 16, 2025, following the satisfaction of customary closing conditions.
