= The Immortals (1995 film) =

- Poster
- Directed by: Brian Grant
- Screenplay by: Kevin Bernhardt
- Story by: Elie Samaha
- Produced by: Elie Samaha
- Starring: Eric Roberts; Joe Pantoliano; Tia Carrere; Tony Curtis; Clarence Williams III; William Forsythe; Chris Rock
- Music by: Claude Gaudette
- Distributed by: Hallmark Home Entertainment
- Release date: September 6, 1995
- Running time: 98 minutes
- Country: United States
- Language: English

The Immortals is a 1995 action thriller film produced by Elie Samaha and directed by Brian Grant. Eric Roberts, Tia Carrere, Joe Pantoliano, Chris Rock, William Forsythe, Clarence Williams III and Tony Curtis feature in this film.

== Plot summary ==
A crafty nightclub owner (Jack) brings together a group of small-time hoods and teams them up in unusual pairs (black man and white racist, Ivy Leaguer and simpleton) for a set of multiple heists which turn out to be an elaborate double cross against a notorious gangster (Dominic). During an extended standoff in a nightclub between Jack and his band of thieves and Dominic's henchman, the hoods discover why Jack brought them all together for what amounts to a suicidal mission.
