= Big Time Adolescence =

- Official poster
- Directed by: Jason Orley
- Written by: Jason Orley
- Produced by: Mason Novick; Mickey Liddell; Pete Shilaimon; Will Phelps; Glen Trotiner; Jeremy Garelick
- Starring: Pete Davidson; Griffin Gluck; Emily Arlook; Colson Baker; Sydney Sweeney; Jon Cryer
- Cinematography: Andrew Huebscher
- Edited by: Waldemar Centeno
- Music by: Zachary Dawes; Nick Sena
- Production companies: American High; LD Entertainment; MXN Entertainment
- Distributed by: Hulu; Neon
- Release dates: January 28, 2019 (Sundance); March 13, 2020 (United States)
- Running time: 90 minutes
- Country: United States
- Language: English

Big Time Adolescence is a 2019 American coming-of-age comedy film written and directed by Jason Orley, in his directorial debut. It stars Pete Davidson, Griffin Gluck, Emily Arlook, Colson Baker, Sydney Sweeney and Jon Cryer.

The film had its world premiere at the Sundance Film Festival on January 28, 2019. It was released by Neon on March 13, 2020, to a limited number of theaters and then streaming on Hulu on March 20, 2020. It received positive reviews from critics.

== Plot ==
16-year-old Monroe "Mo" Harris is escorted out of class by a police officer.

When Mo was younger, his older sister Kate dated her classmate Isaac "Zeke" Presanti. Even after she broke up with him, Zeke and Mo remained close friends, despite their age difference. Mo's parents, Reuben and Sherri, allow Mo to continue hanging out with Zeke despite their concern about Zeke's influence. Zeke, now 23, works a dead-end job and spends most of his time smoking marijuana and drinking.

Mo spends his free time with Zeke, his friends, and Zeke's girlfriend Holly, rather than anyone his own age. Zeke helps Mo acquire drinks for a senior party after being invited by fellow sophomore Stacey, and gives Mo some weed to sell there. This earns Mo credibility among the seniors at the party. Seeing his classmate Sophie there, they exchange numbers after he strikes up a conversation with her.

Mo later takes Sophie out on a dinner date for sushi before taking her back to Zeke's place to hang out. They drink, and before Sophie leaves, she and Mo kiss. This earns him the nickname "Tongue Daddy" from his friends, which Zeke tattoos onto Mo's chest. The next night Mo comes home accidentally stoned after being in a hot boxed car with Zeke, right before a family dinner. His father realizes this and sees his tattoo, resulting in Mo being grounded and forbidden from hanging out with Zeke.

Mo continues to supply drugs and alcohol at the parties. Though he has doubts about his actions and their risks, Zeke encourages him to and continues to supply him, even quitting his job due to the amount of money Mo makes off of selling.

Mo begins to ignore Sophie, per Zeke's advice on how to get girls, which makes her mad. After realizing his mistake, he tries to explain himself but she refuses to listen and walks out on him. Mo gets a call from Holly and he goes over to her place. She tells him that she and Zeke have broken up because he was cheating, and she has sex with Mo. After the break-up, Zeke spends his night getting drunk and high, and sings in a karaoke bar.

Stacey is distracted while driving with a few seniors who are smoking and drinking after a party, resulting in him driving his mom's car into a ditch. Everyone else quickly gets out and leaves instead of helping, and he abandons the car. Coming back in the morning to the ditch, he realizes that the car is gone. The same day a police officer comes to school and interrogates him, telling him he won't get in trouble if he reveals who supplied the drugs they found in the car.

When the cops show up at a party, looking for Mo off of a tip from Stacey, Zeke manages to get him out of the house and brings Mo back to his place. Mo cries about how he has become a degenerate like Zeke, even though he never wanted to be. He also admits he had sex with Holly and that he wanted to tell him sooner, but Zeke forgives him and they reconcile. Zeke offers to take the fall for Mo supplying drugs at the party, but he declines his offer saying that he has done enough and he needs to handle this on his own.

The following day, Mo is escorted out of class (as shown at the beginning of the movie), gets expelled from school, and is sentenced to community service. Reuben drives to Zeke's house and orders him to stay away from Mo, and briefly assaults him when Zeke refuses to comply.

Three months later, Mo stops at a fast-food restaurant after doing his regular drug test and is surprised to see Zeke working at the drive-thru window. Mo sits with Zeke inside to catch up. Zeke asks him if he wants to hang out the next day and Mo says maybe. Mo drives away, and through the rear window Zeke is seen smoking a blunt before sitting down on the curb with his head in his hands.

== Cast ==
- Griffin Gluck as Monroe "Mo" Harris, Kate's brother and Reuben and Sherri's son
- Pete Davidson as Isaac "Zeke" Presanti
- Jon Cryer as Reuben Harris, Mo and Kate's father and Sherri's husband
- Oona Laurence as Sophie
- Sydney Sweeney as Holly, Zeke's girlfriend
- Thomas Barbusca as William (Stacey) Epstein
- Colson Baker as Nick
- Julia Murney as Sherri Harris, Mo and Kate's mother and Reuben's wife
- Emily Arlook as Kate Harris, Mo's sister and Reuben and Sherri's daughter
- Nick Ziobro as Chad
- Michael Devine as Officer Peters
- Andre Hyland as Tony

== Production ==
In June 2018, it was announced that Griffin Gluck, Pete Davidson, Sydney Sweeney, Machine Gun Kelly, Thomas Barbusca, Emily Arlook, and Oona Laurence had joined the cast of the film, with Jason Orley directing from a screenplay he wrote. Will Phelps, Glen Trotiner, Mason Novick, and Jeremy Garelick produced the film, under their American High and LD Entertainment banners, respectively. In July 2018, Jon Cryer joined the cast of the film.

=== Filming ===
Principal photography began in July 2018 in Syracuse, New York. Production also took place in Manlius, New York and Liverpool, New York.

== Release ==
The film had its world premiere at the Sundance Film Festival on January 28, 2019. At the Toronto International Film Festival in September 2019, Hulu acquired distribution rights to the film for $4 million, with Neon handling theatrical distribution. It was released on March 13, 2020, by Neon in a limited theatrical release, before digital streaming on March 20 by Hulu.

== Critical reception ==
Big Time Adolescence received positive reviews from film critics. On review aggregator Rotten Tomatoes, the film holds an approval rating of 85% based on 85 critics' reviews, with an average rating of 6.7/10. The website's critical consensus reads, "Funny, heartfelt, and brought to life by a smartly assembled ensemble, Big Time Adolescence finds fresh pleasures in the crowded coming-of-age genre." On Metacritic, the film holds a rating of 64 out of 100, based on 21 critics, indicating "generally favorable" reviews.

Brian Lowry of CNN criticized Davidson's performance, stating, "Pete Davidson doesn't exactly stretch much as a performer." In the same article, Lowry praised Gluck's performance.
