= Grown-ish =

American television sitcom (2018–2024)

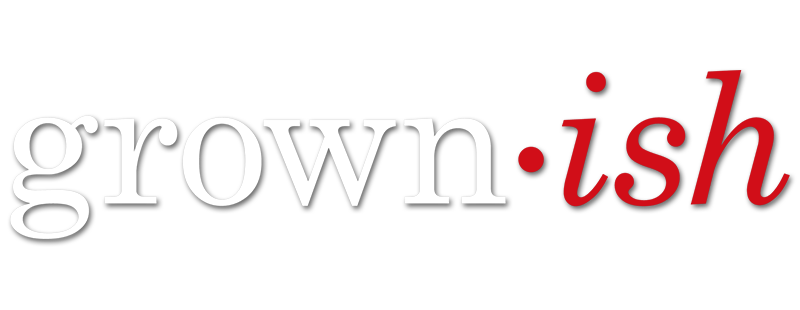
- Genre: Teen sitcom; Comedy-drama
- Created by: Kenya Barris; Larry Wilmore
- Based on: Black-ish by Kenya Barris
- Starring: Yara Shahidi; Deon Cole; Trevor Jackson; Francia Raisa; Emily Arlook; Jordan Buhat; Chris Parnell; Chloe Bailey; Halle Bailey; Luka Sabbat; Diggy Simmons; Marcus Scribner; Daniella Perkins; Justine Skye; Tara Raani
- Narrated by: Yara Shahidi; Marcus Scribner
- Theme music composer: Chloe x Halle
- Opening theme: "Grown" by Chloe x Halle
- Composer: Vincent Jones
- Country of origin: United States
- Original language: English
- No. of seasons: 6
- No. of episodes: 105 (list of episodes)

Production
- Executive producers: Anthony Anderson; Helen Sugland; Kenya Barris; Julie Bean; Paul Young; Laurence Fishburne; Peter Principato; E. Brian Dobbins; Jenifer Rice-Genzuk Henry; Craig Doyle; Courtney Lilly
- Producer: Yara Shahidi
- Cinematography: Paula Huidobro; Mark Doering-Powell
- Camera setup: Single-camera
- Running time: 20–23 minutes
- Production companies: Artists First; Khalabo Ink Society; Cinema Gypsy Productions; Principato-Young Entertainment; ABC Signature (Note: Credited as ABC Signature Studios through season 3)

Original release
- Network: Freeform
- Release: January 3, 2018 – May 22, 2024

Related
- Black-ish

Grown-ish (stylized as grown·ish) is an American teen comedy drama television series and a spin-off of the ABC series Black-ish. The single-camera comedy follows the Johnson family's children as they go to college and begin their journeys to adulthood, only to quickly discover that not everything goes their way once they leave the nest. The first four seasons follow eldest daughter Zoey (Yara Shahidi), with Deon Cole, Trevor Jackson, Francia Raisa, Emily Arlook, Jordan Buhat, Chloe Bailey, Halle Bailey, Luka Sabbat and Chris Parnell also starring, while the fifth season onward follows eldest son and Zoey's younger brother Andre Junior (Marcus Scribner) as he attends college after Zoey's graduation, with Diggy Simmons and Daniella Perkins also starring.

Created by Black-ish's Kenya Barris and Larry Wilmore, the series is produced by Khalabo Ink Society, Cinema Gypsy Productions and Principato-Young Entertainment, with Anthony Anderson, Brian Dobbins, and Helen Sugland acting as executive producers. Freeform officially ordered 13 episodes of the spin-off in May 2017, and it premiered on January 3, 2018. In January 2018, Freeform renewed the series for a second season of 21 episodes which premiered on January 2, 2019. In February 2019, Freeform renewed the series for a third season, which premiered on January 16, 2020. In January 2020, the series was renewed for a fourth season, while the second half of the third season premiered on January 21, 2021. The fourth season premiered on July 8, 2021. The second half of the fourth season premiered on January 27, 2022, with the majority of the original cast departing at the end of the season. In March 2022, the series was renewed for a forthcoming fifth season and Marcus Scribner and Daniella Perkins upped to series regulars, the former following the series finale of Black-ish, replacing Shahidi as lead character and narrator of the series. The first half of the fifth season premiered on July 20, 2022. In January 2023, the series was renewed for a sixth season. In March 2023, it was announced that the sixth season would be its final season. The sixth and final season premiered on June 28, 2023 and was split into two parts, with the second arriving March 27, 2024.

== Plot ==
The first four seasons follow the Johnson family's firstborn daughter Zoey leaving the family to go to college. As she attends the fictional California University of Liberal Arts (Cal U for short) while befriending some people, she discovers that her journey to adulthood and her departure from the family does not go the way she hoped. The fifth season onward follows the Johnson family's oldest son, Zoey's younger brother and former college dropout Junior as he attends Cal U following Zoey's graduation.

== Cast and characters ==
Actor	Character	Zoey Johnson years				Andre Johnson Jr. years	
Actor	Character	Season 1	Season 2	Season 3	Season 4	Season 5	Season 6
Yara Shahidi	Zoey Johnson	Main (Note: Shahidi retains top billing in season 5 but only makes limited appearances.)	Main	Main	Main	Main	Recurring
Deon Cole	Professor/Dean Charlie Telphy	Main	Main	Recurring	Recurring		
Trevor Jackson	Aaron Jackson	Main	Main	Main	Main	Main	Main
Francia Raisa	Analisa "Ana" Torres	Main	Main	Main	Main	Guest	Guest
Emily Arlook	Nomi Segal	Main	Main	Main	Main	Guest	Guest
Jordan Buhat	Vivek Shah	Main	Main	Main	Main	Guest	Guest
Chris Parnell	Dean Burt Parker	Main					
Chloe Bailey	Jazlyn "Jazz" Forster	Main (Note: Credited as recurring for the first three episodes of season one, and credited as a main cast member thereafter.)	Main	Main	Main	Guest	
Halle Bailey	Skyler "Sky" Forster	Main (Note: Credited as recurring for the first three episodes of season one, and credited as a main cast member thereafter.)	Main	Main	Recurring		
Luka Sabbat	Luca Hall	Main (Note: Credited as recurring for the first three episodes of season one, and credited as a main cast member thereafter.)	Main	Main	Main		Guest
Diggy Simmons	Douglas "Doug" Frederick Edwards	Recurring	Recurring	Main	Main	Main	Main
Marcus Scribner	Andre "Junior" Johnson		Recurring	Recurring	Guest	Main	Main
Daniella Perkins	Kiela Hall				Recurring	Main	Main
Justine Skye	Annika Longstreet					Recurring	Main
Tara Raani	Zaara Ali					Recurring	Main

=== Main ===
- Yara Shahidi as Zoey Johnson (seasons 1–5; recurring season 6), the narrator and main protagonist of the series who is shown in the break of a scene. She meets her six core friends in Professor Telphy's class. She originally intended to become a fashion designer but has since created her own major, "The Sociology of Fashion", and has turned her career goals toward fashion styling. She is a freshman in season 1, a sophomore in season 2, a junior in season 3, and a senior in season 4. She dated Luca until their breakup at the end of season 2. She began dating Aaron in the season 3 finale. As of the season 3 break, she dropped out of Cal U. to further her career as a designer after having accepted an opportunity with Luca's company, Anti Muse. However, she resigns from her job and returns to Cal U. to finish her junior year. In season 4, she takes internships with big-name companies as a way to advance her career, but she has troubles with Aaron. She is graduated from college at the end of season 4. In season 5, she is a successful designer living in New York, while bouncing back to Los Angeles to continue her now long-distance relationship with Aaron.
- Deon Cole as Professor Charlie Telphy (seasons 1–2; recurring seasons 3–4), a close friend of Zoey's family and an adjunct professor teaching evening classes at Cal U., including one called "Digital Marketing Strategies", which is all about drones. He becomes dean of students in season 2.
- Trevor Jackson as Aaron Jackson, a student at Cal U. He is "woke," as evidenced by his many buttons referencing various African American-centered causes and issues. In season 2, he takes a job as an RA for Hawkins Hall. He is a sophomore in season 1, a junior in season 2, and a senior in season 3. In the season 3 finale, he graduates. In season 4, he teaches night classes at Cal U.
- Francia Raisa as Analisa "Ana" Patricia Torres (seasons 1–4; guest seasons 5 and 6), a student at Cal U. She was born to Cuban immigrants, is a devout Catholic, and a Republican. She was Zoey's roommate in season 1. In season 2, she and Zoey move into an apartment with Nomi, and she develops a romantic interest in Aaron. Ana is a freshman in season 1, a sophomore in season 2, a junior in season 3, and a senior in season 4. In season 2, episode 19, her major is revealed as Political Science. Others observe her need to get the answers she wants, even where doing so necessitates spying and snooping.
- Emily Arlook as Nomi Segal (seasons 1–4; guest seasons 5 and 6), is Jewish American. She is bisexual, but she is not out to her family until season 2. She is a freshman in season 1, a sophomore in season 2, a junior in season 3, and a senior in season 4. At the start of the third season, she is revealed to be pregnant from a one-night stand. During the first half of season 3, she drops out of Cal U., returning to her parents' home while dealing with her pregnancy. In the second half of season 3, she returns to campus with her newborn daughter Luna. At the end of season 4, she moves to Connecticut to attend Yale Law School.
- Jordan Buhat as Vivek Shah (seasons 1–4; guest seasons 5 and 6), a first-generation Gujarati Indian American. His parents are devout Hindus. He deals drugs to support his clothing choices. He is an engineering major and has shown great intelligence throughout the series. He originally lived in the rich-kid Winthrop house but was kicked out in season 2 and has been crashing at Hawkins Hall with Aaron and Doug. He is a freshman in season 1, a sophomore in season 2, and a junior in season 3. He is best known for having a style that is highly influenced by black culture. In season 3, after a substantial raise in his drug-dealing income, he rents a house off campus for him and the girls to live for the remainder of their time in college. He also starts dating a girl named Heidi until the season finale. In season 4, Vivek gets expelled from Cal U, following his arrest last season, which leads to his father disowning him. They are on the verge of reconciling when his father dies of a heart ailment. At the end of the season, he re-enrolls in a new college to complete his engineering degree, and moves to Miami with Ana, who he is now dating.
- Chris Parnell as Dean Burt Parker (season 1), the dean of students. He is also Nomi's uncle. He leaves the university for unknown reasons before the events of season 2.
- Chloe Bailey as Jazlyn "Jazz" Forster (seasons 1–4; guest season 5), Sky's twin sister and a track athlete at Cal U. From South Los Angeles, she is intensely smart, sassy, but focused on the bigger picture. Her focus is lost after getting into a relationship with Doug, causing a rift to form between her and her sister. She is a freshman in season 1, a sophomore in season 2, a junior in season 3, and a senior in season 4. Her major is in Economics, as revealed in season 2.
- Halle Bailey as Skylar "Sky" Forster (seasons 1–3; recurring season 4), Jazz's twin sister and a track athlete at Cal U. From South Los Angeles, she is intensely smart, sassy, but focused on the bigger picture. She remains focused on her goals even while also partying and meeting guys, something her sister has trouble with which causes a rift between them. She is a freshman in season 1, a sophomore in season 2, and a junior in Season 3. Her major is in Early Childhood Education, as revealed in season 2. She leaves for Tokyo at the end of season 3 after gaining a spot on the Olympic Team.
- Luka Sabbat as Luca Hall (seasons 1–4; guest season 6), a fashion design major at Cal U., and a stoner. He is very independent and a trendsetter, as seen in his outlandish fashion choices and his relaxed attitude toward life. He works alongside Zoey at Teen Vogue, an internship he got by chance. Zoey and Luca become a couple starting season 2, but break up in the season 2 finale. He is a freshman in season 1, a sophomore in season 2, a junior in season 3, and a senior in season 4.
- Diggy Simmons as Douglas Frederick "Doug" Edwards (seasons 3–6; recurring seasons 1–2), Jazlyn's ex-boyfriend. He is best friends with Aaron and Vivek.
- Marcus Scribner as Andre "Junior" Johnson, Jr. (seasons 5–6; recurring seasons 2–3; guest season 4), Zoey's younger brother from Black-ish. He becomes Sky's romantic interest in season 2. Following Zoey's graduation at the end of season 4 and the series finale of black-ish, Junior replaces Zoey as the lead character and narrator of grown-ish, attending Cal U. in the fifth season. He is a freshman in season 5, then a sophomore in season 6.
- Daniella Perkins as Kiela Hall (seasons 5–6; recurring season 4), Luca's younger sister, and Doug's fling and love interest who just started at Cal U. In Season 5, she continues to go to Cal U. as a sophomore, alongside Junior. In season 6, she is a junior, and is now living in a sober building with Anika, Zaara and Lauren.
- Justine Skye as Annika Longstreet (season 6; recurring season 5), She is a freshman in season 5. She is a sophisticated, intelligent go-getter who hardly takes no for an answer and is determined to make it to the top. She also becomes Junior's main love interest.
- Tara Raani as Zaara Ali (season 6; recurring season 5), She is a freshman in season 5. She is a first-generation college student who is extremely focused and is on track to become a doctor. She is Junior's roommate and friend. She is a sophomore in season 6, and was in a new relationship with Drea.

=== Recurring ===
- Da'Vinchi as Cash Mooney (seasons 1–2), Zoey's first college boyfriend and star of the school's basketball team. Also, he's her first love and the first person she had sex with.
- Katherine Moennig as Professor Paige Hewson (season 2), the professor of Gender Studies class that Zoey and her friends are in who was also Nomi's love interest.
- Ryan Destiny as Jillian (season 3), a transfer student from Spelman College and Luca's new love interest.
- Henri Esteve as Javier / "Javi" (seasons 3–4), a gorgeous grad student whom Ana interns with at Cal U. Javier and Ana start dating in Season 3.
- Andrew Liner as Rodney (season 3), a soft-spoken, baby-faced babe with a killer smile who becomes Sky's new love interest.
- Raigan Harris as Rochelle (seasons 2–3; guest season 4), an opinionated, well-informed member of the Black Student Union who is always down to fight for a cause. Rochelle ends up dating Aaron most of Season 3. She and Zoey sparks a rivalry due to them both having feelings for Aaron. Before the Season 3 finale, Aaron breaks up with Rochelle after cheating on her with Zoey. In spite of helping Zoey obtain an internship in season 4, she is revealed to still be spiteful and angry towards her for the event.
- Slick Woods as Sharon "Slick" (season 5)
- Ceyair Wright as Zeke (season 5; guest season 6), He is a freshman in season 5. He is a handsome football player that is "just here for football and the ladies. He is one of Junior's new friends and also frat brother. At the start of season 6, he transfers to a different college.
- Amelie Zilber as Lauryn (seasons 5-6), She is a freshman when she is introduced in season 5. She is a singer and undecided major college student that may be a little shy but is always open to having a bit of fun. She is Zeke's girlfriend during season 5. Starting with season 6, she makes frequent appearances and moves in with Junior's friend group but is still credited as a recurring character.

=== Notable guests ===
- Anthony Anderson as Andre "Dre" Johnson Sr., Zoey's father
- Tracee Ellis Ross as Dr. Rainbow "Bow" Johnson, Zoey's mother
- Laurence Fishburne as Earl "Pops" Johnson, Zoey's grandfather
- Jenifer Lewis as Ruby Johnson, Zoey's grandmother
- Miles Brown as Jack Johnson, Zoey's younger brother and Diane's twin brother
- Marsai Martin as Diane Johnson, Zoey's younger sister and Jack's twin sister
- Joey Badass as himself
- Saweetie as Indigo
- Jordyn Woods as Dee
- D.C. Young Fly as Rafael
- Latto as Sloane
- Lil Yachty as Cole Hudson
- Kelly Rowland as Edie
- Druski as Brock
- Omarion as himself

== Episodes ==
Season	Episodes		Originally released		
Season	Episodes		First released	Last released	Network
Backdoor pilot			May 3, 2017		ABC
1	13		January 3, 2018	March 28, 2018	Freeform
2	21	11	January 2, 2019	March 6, 2019	Freeform
2	21	10	June 5, 2019	August 7, 2019	Freeform
3	17	8	January 16, 2020	March 5, 2020	Freeform
3	17	9	January 21, 2021	March 18, 2021	Freeform
4	18	9	July 8, 2021	September 2, 2021	Freeform
4	18	9	January 27, 2022	March 24, 2022	Freeform
5	18	9	July 20, 2022	September 14, 2022	Freeform
5	18	9	January 18, 2023	March 15, 2023	Freeform
6	18	9	June 28, 2023	August 23, 2023	Freeform
6	18	9	March 27, 2024	May 22, 2024	Freeform

== Production ==
"Liberal Arts", the 23rd episode of season 3 of Black-ish, functioned as a backdoor pilot for this spin-off, featuring Yara Shahidi's character, Zoey Johnson, as she goes to college. Shahidi stars in the series, with Chris Parnell, Mallory Sparks, Matt Walsh, and Trevor Jackson guest starring in the backdoor pilot. The series was later titled College-ish, with Parnell and Jackson reprising their roles from the backdoor pilot, and Emily Arlook replacing Mallory Sparks in the role of Miriam. In August 2017, Francia Raisa joined the cast as Ana along with Jordan Buhat as Vivek. Music duo Chloe and Halle would also star as twin sisters Sky and Jazz.

On May 19, 2017, Freeform (ABC's sister network) officially ordered 13 episodes of the spin-off under the final title, Grown-ish. On January 18, 2018, Freeform renewed the series for a second season. On February 5, 2019, the series was renewed for a third season. On November 7, 2019, it was announced that the third season would premiere on January 16, 2020. On January 17, 2020, Freeform renewed the series for a fourth season.

On May 19, 2020, Freeform announced that the remaining episodes from season three would premiere in 2021 due to the impact of COVID-19 pandemic in the television industry.

The fourth season premiered on July 8, 2021, with the majority of the original cast leaving at its conclusion.

On March 7, 2022, Freeform renewed the series for a fifth season with Marcus Scribner joining the cast, replacing Shahidi as lead character of the series, as Junior Johnson, Zoey's younger brother from black-ish, with Zakiyyah Alexander and Courtney Lilly showrunning the season, which follows Junior as he finally decides to attend college. On May 4, 2022, it was announced that the first half of the fifth season would premiere on July 20, 2022. On January 11, 2023, Freeform renewed the series for a sixth season. On March 29, 2023, it was reported that the sixth season would be its final season. The sixth and final season premiered on June 28, 2023.

== Release ==
The series premiered on January 3, 2018, on Freeform. Grown-ish aired in Canada on ABC Spark, simulcast with Freeform in the United States. Globally, the series is also available on Disney+.

== Reception ==
=== Critical response ===
On review aggregator Rotten Tomatoes, the first season has an approval rating of 95% based on 39 reviews, with an average rating of 7.90/10. The website's critical consensus reads, "grown-ish quickly works through its growing pains to establish itself as its own socially aware show with a fresh perspective on the college experience, driven by the charming and capable Yara Shahidi." Metacritic, which uses a weighted average, assigned a score of 71 out of 100, based on 15 critics, indicating "generally favorable reviews".

On review aggregator Rotten Tomatoes, the second season has an approval rating of 100% based on 5 reviews, with an average rating of 7.70/10.

=== Ratings ===
Viewership and ratings per season of Grown-ish
Season	Timeslot (ET)	Episodes	First aired		Last aired		TV season	Avg. viewers (millions)	18–49 rank	Avg. 18–49 rating
Season	Timeslot (ET)	Episodes	Date	Viewers (millions)	Date	Viewers (millions)	TV season	Avg. viewers (millions)	18–49 rank	Avg. 18–49 rating
1	Wednesday 8 p.m. (1, 3–13); Wednesday 8:31 p.m. (2)	13	January 3, 2018	0.95	March 28, 2018	0.40	2017–18	0.61	TBD	0.27
2	Wednesday 8 p.m. (1, 3–21); Wednesday 8:31 p.m. (2)	21	January 2, 2019	0.67	August 7, 2019	0.56	2018–19	0.47	TBD	0.20
3	Thursday 8 p.m.	17	January 16, 2020	0.48	March 18, 2021	0.37	2019–20	0.33	TBD	0.14
4	Thursday 8 p.m. (1–9); Thursday 10 p.m. (10–18)	18	July 8, 2021	0.26	March 24, 2022	0.19	2020–21	TBD	TBD	TBD
5	Wednesday 10 p.m.	18	July 20, 2022	0.18	March 15, 2023	0.12	2021–22	TBD	TBD	TBD
6	Wednesday 10 p.m.	18	June 28, 2023	0.12	May 22, 2024	0.05	2022–23	TBD	TBD	TBD

=== Accolades ===
Year	Award	Category	Nominee(s)	Result	Ref.
2018	MTV Movie & TV Awards	Best Show	Grown-ish	Nominated	
2018	Black Reel Awards	Outstanding Comedy Series	Grown-ish	Nominated	
2018	Black Reel Awards	Outstanding Actress in a Comedy Series	Yara Shahidi	Nominated	
2018	Teen Choice Awards	Choice Comedy TV Actress	Yara Shahidi	Nominated	
2018	Teen Choice Awards	Choice Breakout TV Star	Luka Sabbat	Nominated	
2018	Imagen Awards	Best Supporting Actress – Television	Francia Raisa	Nominated	
2019	NAACP Image Awards	Outstanding Comedy Series	Grown-ish	Nominated	
2019	NAACP Image Awards	Outstanding Actress in a Comedy Series	Yara Shahidi	Nominated	
2019	Black Reel Awards	Outstanding Comedy Series	Grown-ish	Nominated	
2019	Teen Choice Awards	Choice TV Comedy Actress	Yara Shahidi	Nominated	
2019	Teen Choice Awards	Choice Summer TV Actress	Yara Shahidi	Nominated	
2019	Teen Choice Awards	Choice Summer TV Actor	Luka Sabbat	Nominated	
2020	NAACP Image Awards	Outstanding Comedy Series	Grown-ish	Nominated	
2020	NAACP Image Awards	Outstanding Actress in a Comedy Series	Yara Shahidi	Nominated	
2020	NAACP Image Awards	Outstanding Supporting Actress in a Comedy Series	Halle Bailey	Nominated	
2021	ReFrame Stamp	IMDbPro Top 200 Scripted TV Recipients	Grown-ish	Won	
2021	Primetime Creative Arts Emmy Awards	Outstanding Cinematography for a Single-Camera Series (Half-Hour)	Mark Doering-Powell (for "Know Yourself")	Nominated	
2022	Clio Awards	Television/Series: Social Media	Grown-ish	Gold	
2022	Primetime Creative Arts Emmy Awards	Outstanding Cinematography for a Single-Camera Series (Half-Hour)	Mark Doering-Powell (for "Put Your Hands Where My Eyes Could See")	Nominated	
