= Dan Eldon =

British-born Kenyan photojournalist, artist and activist (1970–1993)

- Born: Daniel Robert Eldon; 18 September 1970; Hampstead, London, England, UK
- Died: 12 July 1993 (aged 22); Mogadishu, Somalia
- Cause of death: Beating
- Other name: Mayor of Mogadishu
- Occupations: Journalist, artist, activist

Daniel Robert Eldon (18 September 1970 – 12 July 1993) was a British-American photojournalist, artist and activist who was killed in Somalia whilst working as a Reuters photojournalist. His journals were published posthumously in four volumes by Chronicle Books, including The Journey Is the Destination, The Art of Life, and Safari as a Way of Life.

== Early life ==
Eldon was born in London on 18 September 1970, the son of Kathy and Mike Eldon. His father was an Israeli-born British citizen of Jewish descent, and his mother was an American Protestant of German and Irish descent. He had one younger sister, Amy. When Eldon was seven years old, his family moved to Nairobi, Kenya. His parents later divorced.

In Kenya, Eldon initially attended a British school, before transferring to the International School of Kenya. The family was living in Kenya in 1982, during an attempted coup in the country. 12-year-old Eldon arrived back in Kenya from a summer holiday several days after the coup and witnessed some of the aftermath. In his teens, Eldon began taking pictures which were featured in local newspapers and magazines.

At 14, with his sister and friends, Eldon raised $5,000 in a fundraising campaign for a young Kenyan girl, Atieno, to have heart surgery. At 15, Eldon sold handmade beaded jewelry made by a Maasai family to students and friends to support them. Around this time Eldon began creating personal journals filled with collages, photographs, and drawings, often using satire and cartoons as commentary.

In 1988, Eldon graduated from the International School of Kenya, winning the International Relations and Community Service awards. He was voted most outstanding student; he addressed his class on the importance of crossing cultural barriers and caring for others.

== Travel and studies ==
Eldon travelled extensively, visiting 46 countries, and studied seven languages.

In the autumn of 1988, Eldon left Kenya for a job at Mademoiselle magazine in New York before going to college.

In January 1989, Eldon enrolled in Pasadena City College in California. That summer he and a friend researched a journey from Nairobi to Malawi, driving a Land Rover across five countries. They often used local jails as accommodation while on the trip.

After this trip and having transferred to the University of California, Los Angeles, Eldon set up a charity named Student Transport Aid, which raised $25,000 for a trip from a Nairobi to a refugee camp in Malawi in three vehicles. There, they donated one of their vehicles to the Save the Children Fund, as well as money for three wells and blankets for a children's hospital. Team members included Christopher Nolan, Roko Belic, Elinor Tatum, Jeffrey Gettleman, and Eldon's sister Amy.

Eldon returned to UCLA in the autumn of 1990 and began to plan another venture, which required moving to London in January. While attending Richmond College, he purchased another Land Rover for a trip to Morocco that summer. He aimed to buy bracelets and belts to sell in America for Student Transport Aid. He was attacked by Moroccan thieves and delayed by Land Rover malfunctions. He spent the summer in Marrakesh, then came home to ship $5,000 worth of goods to America, which he sold on the beaches of Southern California.

In 1991, he returned to UCLA for one academic year, planning his next trip across the Sahara. Early in 1992, he moved to Mount Vernon, Iowa, to attend classes at Cornell College.

In April 1992, Eldon flew to Kenya, where he was a third assistant director on the film Lost in Africa.

== Work in Somalia and Bloody Monday ==
In the summer of 1992, during the famine in Somalia, Eldon flew to the Kenyan refugee camps. He began taking photographs for Reuters and was among the international photographers and journalists present at the US Marine landing in Mogadishu. Eldon stayed in Mogadishu through to the next spring, during which time his pictures were featured in newspapers and magazines around the world. On 12 June 1993, his photo was featured as a double page spread in Newsweek magazine.

Prior to collapsing the Central government, after the overthrow of the Siad regime and preceding the Somali famine throughout the covering of the famine and civil war, he became popular and Mogadishu's residents nicknamed him the "Mayor of Mogadishu."

=== Bloody Monday ===
On 12 July 1993, an event occurred known to the Somalis as Bloody Monday in which Eldon, German Associated Press photographer Hansi Krauss, Kenyan Reuters sound technician Anthony Macharia, and Kenyan Reuters photographer Hos Maina were murdered following a United States airstrike on a gathering of top clan leaders of the Habr Gidr.

Survivors of the raid went to the journalists' hotel requesting them to take pictures. In a convoy, under the protection of Somalis, Eldon and a group of colleagues went to the bombed area. Some witnesses and former US officials later stated that the raid accidentally hit a meeting of clan elders who were hoping to pressure Aidid into peace, a claim denied by the US Army.

As they began to take photographs, Eldon, Krauss, Macharia and Maina were attacked by a mob and stoned and beaten to death. One soldier who participated in the attack claimed the Army viewed Eldon and the other journalists as collateral damage, stating, "We were considering people that I previously considered not expendable, expendable."

== Film adaptation ==
It was announced in The New York Times on 28 December 2007 that Eldon would be the subject of a biographical film, The Journey Is the Destination, the title of which was taken from a page of his journals that was released under the same name by Chronicle Books. The film was directed by Bronwen Hughes and produced by Martin Katz, Kathy Eldon, Richard Arlook and Kweku Mandela, and was shot in South Africa from July to September 2014. The film, starring Ben Schnetzer, Kelly Macdonald, and Maria Bello, premiered at the 2016 Toronto International Film Festival and was released on Netflix in October 2017. His short life was written about in the book The Art of life by Jennifer New.

== Books ==
- Eldon, Dan (1997). Kathy Eldon (ed.). The Journey is the Destination. Chronicle Books. ISBN 0-8118-1586-2.
- New, Jennifer (2001). Dan Eldon: The Art of Life. Chronicle Books. ISBN 0-8118-2955-3.
- New, Jennifer (12 October 2011). Safari As A Way of Life. Chronicle Books. ISBN 978-1-4521-0207-8.
