= You People =

2023 film by Kenya Barris

- Release poster
- Directed by: Kenya Barris
- Written by: Kenya Barris; Jonah Hill
- Produced by: Kevin Misher; Jonah Hill; Kenya Barris
- Starring: Jonah Hill; Lauren London; David Duchovny; Nia Long; Julia Louis-Dreyfus; Eddie Murphy
- Cinematography: Mark Doering-Powell
- Edited by: Jamie Nelsen
- Music by: Bekon
- Production companies: Khalabo Ink Society; Strong Baby Productions; Misher Films
- Distributed by: Netflix
- Release dates: January 20, 2023 (United States); January 27, 2023 (Netflix)
- Running time: 118 minutes
- Country: United States
- Language: English

You People (Note: The phrase "you people" has casual connotations in modern English. It is used by the speaker to refer to a group considered separate, to which the person does not belong.) is a 2023 American romantic comedy film directed by Kenya Barris, which he co-wrote with Jonah Hill. The film features an ensemble cast that includes Hill, Lauren London, David Duchovny, Nia Long, Julia Louis-Dreyfus, and Eddie Murphy. Its plot focuses on an interracial and interreligious couple, namely a secular Jewish man from the liberal elite and a black nationalist Nation of Islam woman with antisemitic parents, and how their families reckon with modern love amid culture clashes, societal expectations, and generational differences. Set in the Los Angeles area, the two millennials meet by chance and go into uncharted waters in their dating lives.

Critics have analyzed the film as a modern-day retelling of Guess Who's Coming to Dinner (1967), but in which clashes over African American–Jewish relations are even more pointed.

You People was released in select theaters on January 20, 2023, before its Netflix streaming release on January 27. It was the first time Barris directed a feature film. The film received mixed reviews from critics.

== Plot ==
Ezra Cohen, a thirty-five-year-old finance broker and pop culture podcaster, falls into an unlikely relationship with stylist Amira Mohammed. The couple first meet in a meet cute when Amira, frustrated with her GPS navigation system, parks in front of Ezra's work building. He mistakenly believes Amira is his Uber driver, so climbs into the car, setting off an awkward dust-up.

Ezra makes amends by later taking her out to lunch, and they realize there is a mutual attraction despite their differences, as Ezra is Jewish, and Amira is black and the daughter of devout followers of the Nation of Islam.

Amira and Ezra eventually move in together, much to the chagrin of her father Akbar, who'd prefer his daughter were dating another Nation of Islam member. Six months into their relationship, Ezra takes her to meet his family. His rich, progressive Limousine liberal parents Shelley and Arnold patronizingly boast that they are accepting and supportive of everyone, mentioning Ezra's lesbian sister Liza. When Shelley begins to bring up the BLM movement, an embarrassed Ezra steers her out of the room. He confides to Shelley that he plans on proposing.

Before he can propose, Ezra is urged by his friend and fellow podcast host Mo to meet with Amira's parents. Ezra chooses a Roscoe’s Chicken ‘N Waffles restaurant to talk with Akbar and his wife, Fatima. The meeting does not go smoothly, as Akbar views Ezra with suspicion and shows resistance to his wish to marry Amira.

When Amira comes home, she tells Ezra that her mother let her know about their awkward meeting at Roscoe’s. However, when he begins to pull out a ring box, she urges him to go ahead with the proposal and happily accepts.

Ezra decides to quit his job at the brokerage firm to fully pursue his passion for podcasting. Later, the couple invite both sets of parents over for dinner and to discuss wedding plans. The dinner unsurprisingly goes awry, with the parents clashing over Farrakhan's antisemitic views, Fatima accusing all Jewish people of complicity in the Atlantic slave trade, and Shelley inadvertently setting Akbar’s kufi, which is a gift from Farrakhan, on fire.

Ezra and Amira arrange mutual one-on-one time with their future in-laws to help smooth over tensions. Ezra spends the day with Akbar, who constantly undermines Ezra’s self-confidence, from criticizing his career choices to taking him to a barbershop where he knows Ezra will fail to conform to the dress code. Akbar then takes Ezra to a basketball court in mostly Black Inglewood, and urges him to join a pickup game to further humiliate him. Akbar smugly films the game with his phone, but is stunned that Ezra plays very well. Meanwhile, Shelley takes Amira out for a spa day, but she continually shows her cluelessness and obliviousness to her many violations of unwritten social rules of black culture.

For his bachelor party, Ezra heads to Las Vegas with his friends, but Akbar unexpectedly joins the boys. Knowing he’s being watched, Ezra does not take part in the festivities. However, his friends loudly reminisce about the hedonistic acts Ezra committed on previous trips to Vegas. At her bachelorette party in Palm Springs, Amira and her friends are joined by Shelley and Liza. The night suffers from more embarrassments, with Shelley inadvertently making a racist remark during a party game and accidentally ripping off a guest’s wig.

At the rehearsal dinner, both Ezra and Amira speak privately to Akbar and Shelley, with Ezra calling out Akbar’s distrust of his genuine love for Amira, and Amira confronting Shelley about her tone-deaf virtue signalling and patronizing behavior. After their mutual talks, Ezra and Amira decide that their union has too many obstacles to overcome. They call off the wedding and break up.

Three months later, Ezra gives a heartbroken soliloquy over his podcast, saying that black and white people can never truly understand the other's culture or experiences, no matter how deeply they love each other or how hard they try. Both Shelley and Akbar are deeply moved to hear his speech. Akbar, who is particularly cut to the quick, is inspired to contact Shelley.

On the pretext of a shopping excursion, Shelley and Akbar take Ezra and Amira to a trendy boutique and both apologize for their actions. Akbar promises to accept Ezra into the family. Shelley promises to get to know Amira as a human being, rather than continuing to view her as a radical chic trophy to show off to other members of the liberal elite. Ezra and Amira accept their apologies and enter the retail store to find it set up for their wedding, with everyone including friends, family, and a rabbi and NOI minister assembled. Ezra and Amira marry and both families celebrate.

== Cast ==
- Jonah Hill as Ezra
- Lauren London as Amira
- David Duchovny as Arnold
- Nia Long as Fatima
- Julia Louis-Dreyfus as Shelley
- Eddie Murphy as Akbar
- Sam Jay as Mo
- Travis Bennett as Omar
- Molly Gordon as Liza
- Deon Cole as Demetrius
- Andrea Savage as Becca
- Elliott Gould as Mr. Greenbaum
- Rhea Perlman as Bubby
- Mike Epps as Uncle EJ
- La La Anthony as Shaela
- Yung Miami as Tiffany
- Khadijah Haqq as Renee
- Bryan Greenberg as Issac
- Jordan Firstman as Danny
- Andrew Schulz as Cousin Avi
- Matt Walsh as Don Wood
- Emily Arlook as Kim Glassman
- Hal Linden as Mr. Greenwald
- Winnie Holzman as Mrs. Greenwald
- Richard Benjamin as Dr. Green
- Doug Hall as Chris
- Anthony Anderson as Barber #1
- Nelson Franklin as Director
- Rob Huebel as Producer
- Kym Whitley as Aunt Nadine
- Kenya Barris as Airplane Passenger
- Felipe Esparza as Zminski

== Production ==
In June 2021, it was reported that Jonah Hill would star in a Netflix comedy film directed by Kenya Barris from a script written by Hill and Barris. In August 2021, it was announced that Eddie Murphy would star in the film. In September 2021, Julia Louis-Dreyfus, Lauren London, Sam Jay, and Molly Gordon joined the cast. In October 2021, more cast members joined the film, including David Duchovny, Nia Long, Travis Bennett, Andrea Savage, Rhea Perlman, La La Anthony, and Deon Cole. In November 2021, Emily Arlook, Bryan Greenberg, Andrew Schulz, and Jordan Firstman joined the cast.

Filming began in October 2021 in Los Angeles.

== Release ==
You People was released in select theaters on January 20, 2023. It was released on January 27, 2023, by Netflix.

In its first week, the film debuted at number one on the Netflix English-language Top 10 list, being streamed for 55.65 million hours. Between its release and June 2023 the film totaled 181.8 million hours watched (equal to 92.4 million views).

== Reception ==
On the review aggregator website Rotten Tomatoes, 39% of 130 critics' reviews are positive, with an average rating of 5.1/10. The website's consensus reads: "You People has an outstanding cast and plenty of comedic potential—both mostly wasted on a picture that dithers between social commentary and romantic comedy without fully committing to either." On Metacritic, the film has a weighted average score of 50 out of 100, based on 33 critics, indicating "mixed or average reviews".

Pete Hammond of Deadline called it "brilliantly hilarious, pertinent and wickedly smart." Christian Zilko of Indiewire graded the film a B+ and concluded that it "ends up being more of a feel-good rom-com and love letter to Los Angeles than a truly biting satire." Richard Roeper of the Chicago Sun-Times wrote that it "sinks under the weight of its obviousness and a consistently heavy-handed approach, despite the sometimes stylish and well-paced direction from Kenya Barris and an incredibly talented cast." Meanwhile Allisson Josephs of Jew in the City identified a number of traditional antisemitic tropes recycled by the film, going so far as to claim that "Kenya Barris is clearly a [Louis] Farrakhan fan." Mira Fox of The Forward also criticised the film for ignoring the concept of Jews as an ethnic minority in their own right, as well as openly furthering the antisemitic conspiracy theory that "Jews are so wealthy now...from controlling the slave trade. This is a conspiracy theory that's growing in strength, yet the movie does nothing to debunk it".
