= I Want You Back (film) =

2022 film by Jason Orley

- Release poster
- Directed by: Jason Orley
- Written by: Isaac Aptaker; Elizabeth Berger
- Produced by: Isaac Aptaker; Elizabeth Berger; Peter Safran; John Rickard
- Starring: Charlie Day; Jenny Slate; Scott Eastwood; Manny Jacinto; Clark Backo; Gina Rodriguez
- Cinematography: Brian Burgoyne
- Edited by: Jonathan Schwartz
- Music by: Siddhartha Khosla
- Production companies: The Safran Company; The Walk-Up Company
- Distributed by: Amazon Studios
- Release date: February 11, 2022
- Running time: 111 minutes
- Country: United States
- Language: English

I Want You Back is a 2022 American romantic comedy film directed by Jason Orley from a screenplay by Isaac Aptaker and Elizabeth Berger. It stars Charlie Day and Jenny Slate as two recently dumped strangers who team up to sabotage the new relationships of their exes (Gina Rodriguez and Scott Eastwood). Manny Jacinto, Clark Backo, and Mason Gooding also star.

The film was released on Amazon Prime Video on February 11, 2022, and received generally positive reviews.

== Plot ==
In Atlanta, thirty-somethings Peter and Emma are each dumped by their respective romantic partners: Peter's girlfriend Anne feels stifled by the complacency of their six-year relationship, and Emma's boyfriend Noah is discouraged by her lack of responsibility.

Peter and Emma are both heartbroken, but after a chance meeting they become friends and try to help one another navigate their breakups. She confides in him that she considered Noah her "airplane safety mask person": the person she loved so much that she'd put on his emergency airplane oxygen mask before her own, which Peter dismisses as a silly thing to ever do.

One desperate night, Emma and Peter devise a strategy to win back their exes by breaking up their new relationships: Emma will seduce Anne's new boyfriend Logan, and Peter plans to befriend Noah to convince him to break up with his new girlfriend Ginny. Peter gets Noah to be his personal trainer, while Emma volunteers for Logan's middle school production of Little Shop of Horrors.

Peter and Emma also grow closer; he reveals his dream of opening his own nursing home and she admits her lack of ambition is linked to her father's terminal illness. Peter and Noah bond, while Emma successfully impresses Logan by pretending to share his love of theatre, stunning him with a passionate performance of "Suddenly, Seymour". She also helps a troubled student, Trevor, by providing him with guidance for navigating his father's extramarital affair.

After visiting a nightclub together, Peter convinces Noah to go home and take MDMA with three girls, only to learn the girls are minors. After fleeing, Noah tells Peter he is going to propose to Ginny, to Peter's dismay. Peter breaks into Ginny and Noah's to plant fake evidence of Noah's infidelity but can't do it, and instead witnesses Noah's heartfelt proposal.

Meanwhile, Emma manages to talk an eager Logan and a hesitant Anne into attempting a threesome, but Anne ultimately expresses her discomfort and leaves, having decided she wants to get back with Peter. Reconvening, Peter tells Emma of Noah's engagement and, because he is resuming his relationship with Anne, remorsefully cuts contact with her, who is left heartbroken.

Unbeknownst to either of them, Peter and Emma are both invited to Noah's wedding in Savannah and they bring Anne and Logan as their dates. As Peter and Emma awkwardly touch base, she reveals that she has moved out and is studying to become a school counselor.

An embarrassing encounter ensues between all, and Peter realizes Anne never believed in him, while Emma did, leading him to confess his love for her in front of everyone. Emma reveals they conspired to break up each other's new partners, but says she does not reciprocate feelings for Peter (although her tears say otherwise). Anne and Logan break up with Peter and Emma, while Ginny demands they leave the wedding and Noah punches Peter.

The following morning, both Peter and Emma get closure with Anne and Noah. Peter and Emma are on the same flight home, when heavy turbulence causes the oxygen masks to fall, and he rushes out of his seat to help her put her mask on first before his. As the turbulence subsides, Emma and Peter's eyes connect and they smile at one another.

== Cast ==
- Charlie Day as Peter
- Jenny Slate as Emma
- Scott Eastwood as Noah
- Gina Rodriguez as Anne
- Manny Jacinto as Logan
- Clark Backo as Ginny
- Luke David Blumm as Trevor
- Giselle Torres as Chloe
- Isabel May as Leighton
- Quinn Cooke as Taylor
- Pete Davidson as Jase
- Jami Gertz as Rita
- Dylan Gelula as Lisa
- Mason Gooding as Paul
- Jordan Carlos as Mark
- Ben McKenzie as Leighton's dad

== Production ==
In February 2021, Amazon Studios announced that Jenny Slate and Charlie Day were confirmed for the lead roles; that Jason Orley would adapt a screenplay by Isaac Aptaker and Elizabeth Berger; and that Day, Adam Londy and Bart Lipton would executive-produce for The Safran Company and The Walk-Up Company. Principal photography began in March 2021 in Atlanta, Georgia. On April 16, 2021, the Savannah Regional Film Commission announced that extras were needed for four days of filming in Savannah from April 27–30. Other filming locations included the Publico restaurant and Plaza Theatre in Atlanta, and Decatur Square in Decatur.

== Critical response ==
On the review aggregator website Rotten Tomatoes, 87% of 128 critics' reviews are positive, with an average rating of 6.8/10. The website's consensus reads: "With a stellar cast playing well-rounded characters, I Want You Back is the rare rom-com that delivers its romance as capably as its comedy." On Metacritic, the film has a weighted average score of 62 out of 100 based on 23 critics, indicating "generally favorable" reviews.

Michael Phillips of Chicago Tribune gave the film 3 out of 4 stars and wrote, "I Want You Back reminds us of the value of rom-coms with actual com, not to mention performers on the order of Charlie Day and Jenny Slate."
