= Richard Arlook =

American talent manager and film producer

- Born: New York, New York, U.S.
- Education: Emerson College
- Occupations: Founder & President, The Arlook Group; Talent Manager; Film Producer
- Children: 5, including Emily

Richard Arlook is an American talent manager and film producer. Arlook was a senior partner and head of the Motion Picture Literary department at The Gersh Agency. In 2008, he formed The Arlook Group production company.

== Early life and education ==
Arlook was born in New York City, the son of Elinor (née Kreiger), a teacher, and Martin Arlook, an attorney and executive at the National Labor Relations Board and a colonel in the U.S. Army Reserve. Arlook's family moved to Puerto Rico when he was six. There, his father Martin was a senior U.S. government official. Richard graduated from the Antilles High School in Fort Buchanan; and afterward attended Emerson College.

After completing his major, Arlook interned for the "20/20" news magazine in Atlanta.

== Career ==
Following college, Arlook moved to Los Angeles to pursue a career in the film industry. His first job in the industry was as a contestant coordinator for the game show Tic-Tac-Dough. In the early and mid-80s, he worked at Barry & Enright Productions followed by Goldfarb Distributors where he was Director, theatrical services. Arlook then took a position as assistant to Scott Rudin, head of production at Twentieth Century Fox. In 1986, at the age of 24, Arlook founded High Bar Pictures and hired his first talent clients.

Arlook joined the Gersh Talent Agency as a literary agent in 1990, eventually becoming a partner and head of the Motion Picture Literary department.

Arlook appeared as himself in the film 20 Dates (1998), acting with his daughter, Emily.

In 2008 Arlook founded a talent management, production, and consulting company, and named it "The Arlook Group."

Arlook was the executive producer of the 2015 documentary Turn It Up! A Celebration of the Electric Guitar, narrated by Kevin Bacon and featuring Les Paul, B.B. King, Slash, among other guitarists.

In 2013, Arlook took interest in getting a script called Rodham by screenwriter Young Il Kim, whom he was managing, made for film. With Temple Hill Entertainment and his company, The Arlook Group, he became one of the producers. In 2015, A New York Times story announcing that a Scorsese Documentary on Bill Clinton had stalled, also commented on the similar status of Rodham with no comment from the Arlook Group and Temple Hill Entertainment.

In 2015, Arlook produced I Smile Back, starring Sarah Silverman in her first leading dramatic role that also led to her first SAG nomination. The film was released October 23, 2015, and was distributed by Broad Green Pictures. With his client, Morgan Spurlock, Arlook executive produced The HALO Effect on Nickelodeon. Arlook's film, Journey is the Destination, based on the life of photojournalist Dan Eldon, premiered at the 2016 Toronto International Film Festival. On October 21, 2016, It Had To Be You, produced by Arlook and starring Cristin Milioti, was released by Samuel Goldwyn Films.

It was announced in 2018 that Arlook is an executive producer of "A Letter From Rosemary Kennedy", based on letters she wrote to Dorothy Smyth, her companion while visiting Ireland in the 1930's, before she had a lobotomy.

== Personal life ==
Arlook has been married twice and has five children, including actress Emily. Arlook is among breakfast regulars at Nate ‘n Al’s.

== Filmography ==
Producer

- After Midnight (1989)
- Waiting for Forever (2010)
- It Had to Be You (2015)
- I Smile Back (2015)
- The Journey is the Destination (1991)

Executive producer

- Goats (2011)
- Turn It Up! A Celebration of the Electric Guitar (2015)
- The HALO Effect
- A Mouthful of Air (2021)
- Space Oddity (2022)

As an actor

Year	Film	Role	Notes
1998	20 Dates	Agent, self	

Other acknowledgement in credits

Year	Film	Role
2010	Father vs. Son	Thanks
2010	Do It Again	Thanks
2014	Honeymoon	Special thanks
2016	The Umbrella Man	Special thanks
2018	Ashes	Special thanks
2020	If Anything Happens I Love You	Special thanks
