= Clark Backo =

Canadian actress (born 1993)

- Backo at the 2026 Toronto International Film Festival
- Born: September 5, 1993 (age 33); Montreal, Quebec, Canada
- Occupation: Actress
- Years active: 2012–present

Clark Backo (born September 5, 1993) is a Canadian actress. She is most noted for her recurring role as Rosie, Wayne's love interest, in the television series Letterkenny, her starring role as Emma in the Apple TV+ television series The Changeling (2023), and her supporting roles in film as Ginny in I Want You Back (2022) and Dr. Sadie "Christmas" / Lasher in Venom: The Last Dance (2024).

She has also appeared in the television series Remedy, Shoot the Messenger, 21 Thunder, Designated Survivor, Wynonna Earp, Supernatural and The Handmaid's Tale, and in the film Happy Place. She was an ACTRA Award nominee for Outstanding Performance (Female) at the ACTRA Toronto awards in 2021 for Happy Place.

She is the daughter of musician Njacko Backo. In a 2020 interview she noted, "I am an all-around storyteller, originally inspired by my Cameroonian Pops’ persistent storytelling both through his music and the countless children’s tales he creates and acts out.

== Filmography ==
=== Film ===
Year	Title	Role	Notes
2016	Sadie's Last Days on Earth	Brennan	
2018	Seven in Heaven	Nell	
2019	Random Acts of Violence	Todd's Mother	
2020	Happy Place	Samira	
2021	Outsiders	Amira	
2022	I Want You Back	Ginny	
2024	Venom: The Last Dance	Dr. Sadie "Christmas" / Lasher	

=== Television ===
Year	Title	Role	Notes
2012	Beauty & the Beast	Decked Out Twenty-Something	1 episode
2015	Remedy	Rhianna	1 episode
2015	Hemlock Grove	Lydia Lourdes	1 episode
2016	Shoot the Messenger	Avril Trong	3 episodes
2016-2023	Letterkenny	Rosie	Recurring role, 34 episodes
2017	Wynonna Earp	Shae	2 episodes
2017	21 Thunder	Emma Lavigueur	Main role, 8 episodes
2017	The Girlfriend Experience	Guest	1 episode
2017	Designated Survivor	Ava	Recurring role, 8 episodes
2017-2018	Supernatural	Patience Turner	3 episodes
2018	The Handmaid's Tale	Genevieve	1 episode
2019	The Hot Zone	Liz Gellis	2 episodes
2021	Station Eleven	Charlie	Miniseries, 1 episode
2022	Mike	Monica Turner	Miniseries, 1 episode
2023	The Changeling	Emma "Emmy" Valentine	Main role, 7 episodes
2026	Yaga	Carson	Main Cast
