= 20 Dates =

1998 film

- DVD release cover
- Directed by: Myles Berkowitz
- Written by: Myles Berkowitz
- Produced by: Phoenician Films
- Starring: Myles Berkowitz; Elisabeth Wagner; Richard Arlook; Tia Carrere; Robert McKee; Elie Samaha
- Cinematography: Adam Biggs
- Edited by: Lisa Cheek; Michael Elliot
- Music by: Robert F. Mann; Steve Tyrell
- Distributed by: Fox Searchlight Pictures
- Release dates: January 1998 (Slamdance Film Festival); February 26, 1999 (USA)
- Running time: 87 minutes
- Country: United States
- Language: English
- Budget: $60,000 (est)
- Box office: $536,767 (domestic)

20 Dates is a 1998 American mockumentary film. Myles Berkowitz directs and stars as himself, a man who decides to combine "the two biggest failures in my life--professional and personal" by setting out on a filmed quest to have 20 dates and come out with both a movie career and a love interest. While most of his dates are disasters of varying stripes, Myles ultimately meets the lovely Elisabeth on his 17th date and they completely hit it off, leaving him with a new dilemma when he wants to finish the movie anyway and puts his new romance at risk. In real life, Elisabeth and Myles were married in 2000 and had a daughter but were divorced around 2015, with her meeting and marrying someone else. In addition, a 2014 article by Elisabeth about ending her marriage to Myles (who isn't named but is described in it) states that she and Berkowitz were together for "18 years" and married for 14; if this is accurate, then the film isn't even a partial documentary but 100% fiction and that all of the drama in it was fraudulent.

== Cast ==
- Myles Berkowitz as Myles
- Elisabeth Wagner as Elisabeth
- Richard Arlook as The Agent
- Tia Carrere as herself
- Robert McKee as himself
- Elie Samaha as The producer (voice)
- Emily Arlook as Emily

== Release and reception ==
After screening at the 1998 Sundance Film Festival, it was picked up by 20th Century Fox's indie division Fox Searchlight Pictures. An early version of the film had previously screened at the 1997 Slamdance Film Festival. It received mixed reviews from critics. On the review aggregator website Rotten Tomatoes, 35% of 34 critics' reviews are positive, with an average rating of 5.1/10. The website's consensus reads: "20 Dates explores relatable romantic and career frustrations -- unfortunately, it does so through the exploits of someone who's hard to watch and harder to root for." Metacritic, which uses a weighted average, assigned the film a score of 35 out of 100, based on 19 critics, indicating "generally unfavorable" reviews.

Film critic Christopher Null of Filmcritic.com awarded the film four and a half stars out of five and called the film "hysterical" while Leonard Clady of Variety called it "a mockumentary of inordinate skill", concluding that it's "a satisfying and entertaining movie." James Berardinelli of ReelViews.net called the film "inconsequential" but, at the same time, admitted that some parts of the film are "often hilarious."

On the other hand, film critic Roger Ebert of Chicago Sun-Times awarded the film a half star out of a possible four stars, opining that "the film has the obnoxious tone of a boring home movie narrated by a guy shouting in your ear" and concluding by calling the film "incompetent and annoying." Jeff Millar of the Houston Chronicle said the film is "a joke" and that "Berkowitz is a rather annoying person".

== See also ==
- Cinema of the United States
- List of American films of 1998
