= Sydney Sweeney =

American actress (born 1997)

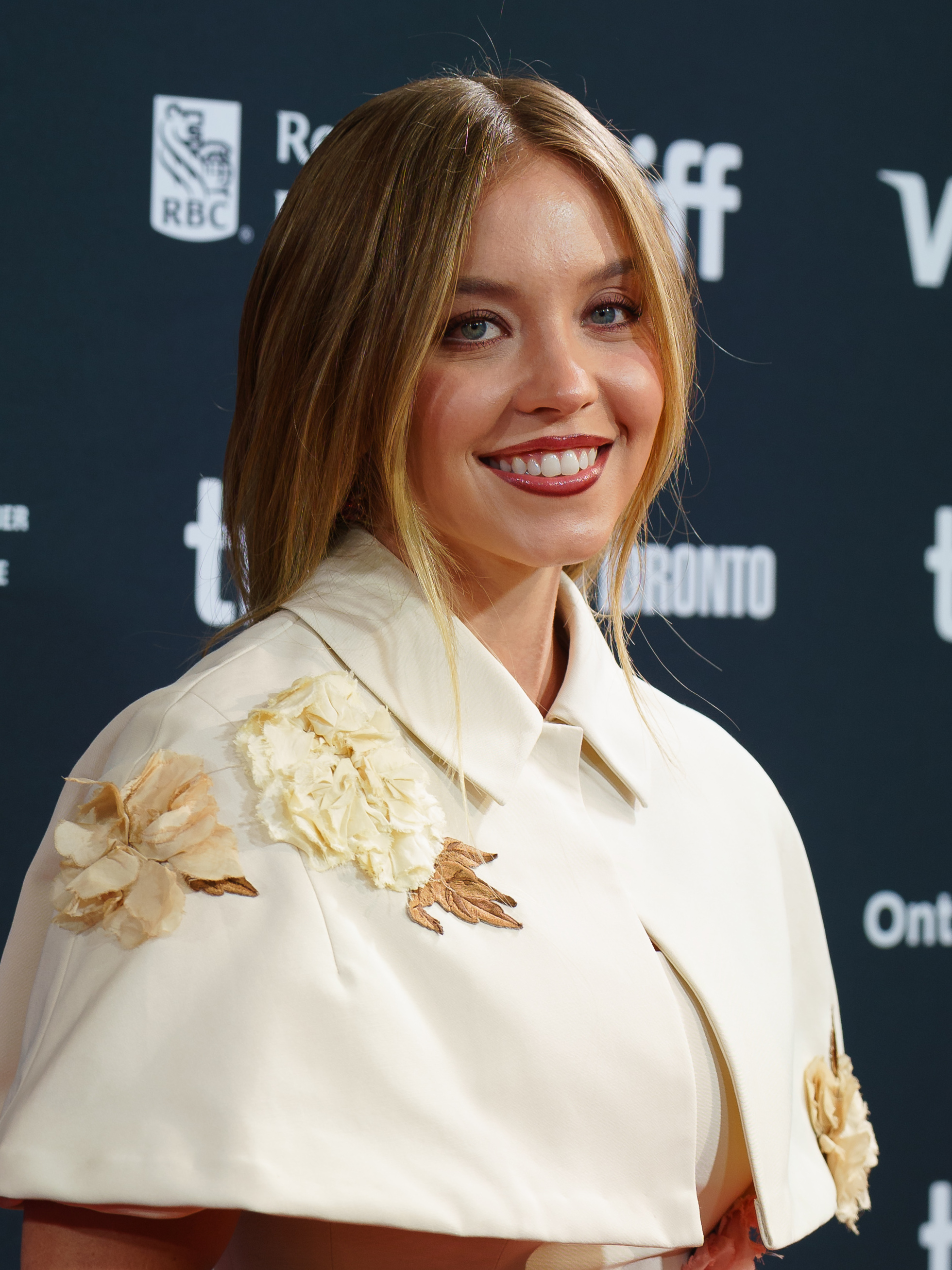
- Sweeney in 2024
- Born: Sydney Bernice Sweeney; September 12, 1997 (age 29); Spokane, Washington, U.S.
- Occupations: Actress; producer
- Years active: 2009–present

Sydney Bernice Sweeney (born September 12, 1997) is an American actress.

She gained early recognition for her roles in the series Everything Sucks!, The Handmaid's Tale, and Sharp Objects in 2018. She received wider acclaim for her performances in the drama series Euphoria (2019–2026) and the first season of the anthology series The White Lotus (2021), both of which earned her nominations for Primetime Emmy Awards. In film, Sweeney garnered critical acclaim for her performances in the drama film Reality (2023) and for her portrayal of professional boxer Christy Martin in the biopic Christy (2025), and has also appeared in the box office hits Anyone but You (2023) and The Housemaid (2025). Her other film credits include Once Upon a Time in Hollywood (2019), Madame Web (2024), and Immaculate (2024).

Sweeney has appeared in various advertising campaigns, some sparking controversy.

== Early life ==
Sydney Bernice Sweeney was born on September 12, 1997, in Spokane, Washington. Her mother is a former criminal defense lawyer and her father works in the hospitality industry. She has a brother, Trent, who joined the U.S. Air Force in 2020. Sweeney was raised in the Idaho panhandle along the Washington border at a rural lakeside home that her family has inhabited for five generations. She has said her family is religious. Sweeney attended school at Saint George's School in Spokane. She said that she was active in numerous sports, and had a wakeboarding accident as a child in which the board sliced the area next to her eye, requiring 19 stitches.

Sweeney became interested in acting after auditioning for a role as an extra in an independent film shooting in the Spokane area. To convince her parents to allow her to pursue acting, she presented them with a five-year business plan. Sweeney began to audition and book commercial acting jobs in Seattle and Portland, Oregon, where the family temporarily resided, until moving to Los Angeles at age 13. In grade school, roughly around the fourth grade, Sweeney, having developed a love of mathematics at a young age, was in a mathematics club called Math Is Cool, and the school's robotics team. She attended Brighton Hall School in Burbank, California, and was valedictorian of her graduating class. In 2016, Sweeney briefly worked at Universal Studios Hollywood, but left after she was hired for an acting job.

== Career ==
=== Early work (2009–2019) ===
As a child actress, Sweeney debuted on television in 2009 with a bit part in an episode of the series Heroes. Her first film role was in the 2010 horror comedy ZMD: Zombies of Mass Destruction. In 2011, Sweeney appeared in the short film Takeo, and the police drama series Chase, both roles earned her two nominations from the Young Artist Awards. Also in 2011, she acted in Michael Lembeck's made-for-television film The Bling Ring, based on the burglary group of the same name. Subsequently, she had supporting roles in television shows such as 90210, Criminal Minds, Grey's Anatomy and Pretty Little Liars.

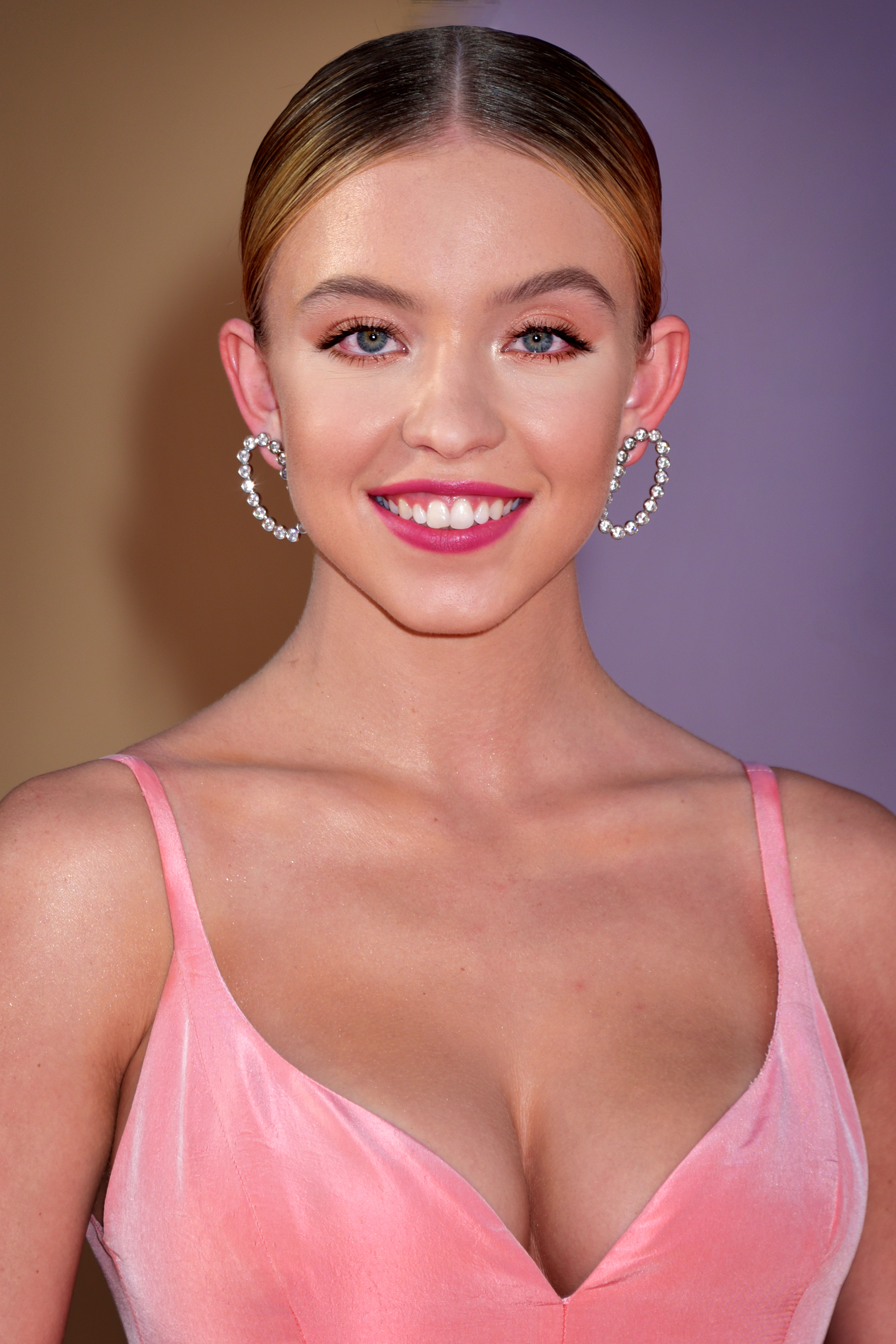
Sweeney in 2019 at the premiere of Once Upon a Time in Hollywood

In 2018, she starred as Emaline Addario in the Netflix series Everything Sucks!, which revolved around two groups of high school students in Oregon in 1996. She appeared in the HBO miniseries Sharp Objects, recurring as Alice, a roommate whom Amy Adams's character meets at a psychiatric facility. Her character originally had a smaller role, but the director kept bringing her in for more scenes. For the role, Sweeney studied stories of girls who experience mental illness and self-harming, and visited hospitals with patients who self-harmed. She filmed Everything Sucks! and Sharp Objects concurrently, the former during the week and the latter on weekends. Sweeney had a role in the 2018 film Under the Silver Lake. She had a recurring role in the second season of the dystopian drama series The Handmaid's Tale as Eden Spencer, a pious and obedient girl from the totalitarian and theocratic Republic of Gilead. She starred as the heroine of the horror film Along Came the Devil. In 2019, Sweeney appeared in the drama film Clementine, the coming-of-age film Big Time Adolescence, and Quentin Tarantino's Once Upon a Time in Hollywood.

=== Breakthrough (2019–2023) ===
In June 2019, Sweeney took the role of Cassie Howard, a teenager with a reputation for promiscuity, in the HBO drama series Euphoria. The show was a breakout hit, becoming the third most watched HBO series as of 2025. Her performance was praised, earning her a nomination for the Primetime Emmy Award for Outstanding Supporting Actress in a Drama Series in 2022. Variety wrote that her performance "proves that Sweeney's one hell of a shapeshifter between her deft turns in this, The Handmaid's Tale, Everything Sucks and Sharp Objects." Her many nude scenes in the series received significant attention, and generated discussions about nudity in film and the male gaze.

In 2020, Sweeney founded the production company Fifty-Fifty Films. The same year, she starred in the television film Nocturne and Webtoon's live-action advertisement for the online comic Lore Olympus, appearing as Persephone. In 2021, Sweeney appeared in the first season of Mike White's anthology series The White Lotus as a sardonic college sophomore. For that performance, she was nominated for the Primetime Emmy Award for Outstanding Supporting Actress in a Limited or Anthology Series or Movie in 2022. She appeared on the Time 100 Next list for 2022.

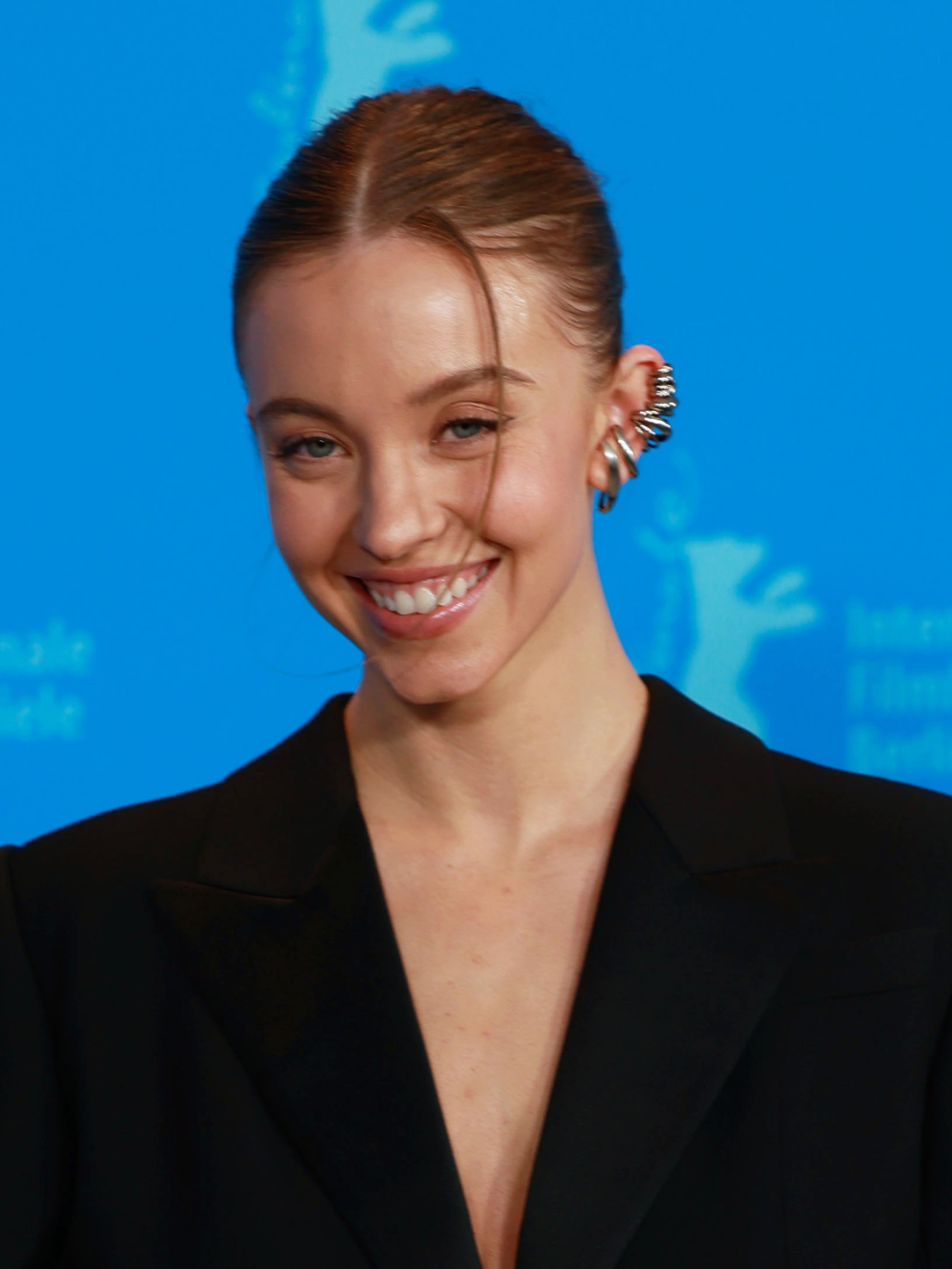
Sweeney at the 73rd Berlin International Film Festival in 2023

In 2023, Sweeney starred as U.S. Air Force veteran Reality Winner in Tina Satter's thriller drama Reality, which premiered in February at the 73rd Berlin Film Festival. Steph Green of IndieWire called the film "inventively mounted and extraordinarily tense" and Sweeney "the real deal". Jessica Kiang of Variety wrote that she played Winner "so convincingly that it's hard to remember her as the sardonic, pampered teen in The White Lotus, or the nice-girl-turned-nasty in Euphoria". Sweeney next had a role in the crime thriller Americana, which premiered at the South by Southwest Festival in March 2023.

Sweeney appeared in the video for the Rolling Stones' single "Angry", from their 2023 album Hackney Diamonds. In response to criticism that the video objectified her, she defended it as "empowerment through embracing my body". At age 25, Sweeney was selected as one of Forbes's 2023 30 Under 30 in the celebrity category. Later that year, she and Glen Powell starred in the romantic comedy Anyone but You, which premiered in December 2023. Sweeney was an executive producer for the film and was instrumental in hiring Powell and director Will Gluck. She also contributed to the script. The film became a sleeper hit, grossing over $220 million worldwide.

=== Established actress (2024–present) ===
In 2024, Sweeney had a supporting role in the superhero film Madame Web, set in Sony's Spider-Man Universe franchise. It was released in February and received negative reviews, bombing at the box office. Of the film's commercial and critical failure, Sweeney said, "I was just hired as an actress in it, so I was just along for the ride for whatever was going to happen." In March 2024, Sweeney hosted an episode of Saturday Night Live. After her appearance, the conservative Canadian newspaper National Post ran an article titled "Are Sydney Sweeney's breasts double-D harbingers of the death of woke?" and right-wing political scientist Richard Hanania tweeted "Wokeness is dead" alongside a clip of Sweeney centered on her bust. Sweeney called the obsession with her appearance "this weird relationship that people have with me that I have no control over". Sweeney then produced and starred in the psychological horror film Immaculate. She originally auditioned for the project in 2014. Years later, she purchased the rights to the screenplay and hired frequent collaborator Michael Mohan to direct. Sweeney has said that she considered producing a way to create opportunities for herself. Later in 2024, she co-starred in Eden, directed by Ron Howard. Reviewing the film for TheWrap, critic Chase Hutchinson wrote that Sweeney "runs away with the whole thing ... it's her subtle looks and a growing agency that turns Eden into something more ... every moment with her at the forefront is Eden at its best."

Sweeney at the 2025 BFI London Film Festival for the premiere of Christy

In June 2025, Sweeney starred alongside Julianne Moore in Echo Valley. She learned how to ride horses for the role. Americana was released in just over 1,000 theaters in August and was labeled a flop by the media, although Deadline predicted it would be profitable for an independent film. Christy, a biopic about boxer Christy Martin, had its world premiere at the 2025 Toronto International Film Festival. Sweeney starred as Martin and also produced the film. Commenting on the role, Sweeney said she was inspired by Martin's strength and perseverance. She said that playing a character "that has so many layers and depths, that's a dream as an actor ... I'm a very outdoorsy, athletic person, so to play a character that [required me] to transform myself was a dream". Critic Owen Gleiberman wrote that Sweeney gave a "potent, true-note, game-changing knockout of a performance ... She fully expresses the soul of a movie star, which is this: She completely becomes the character, and in doing so becomes us." Though the film was well received critically, it was a box-office disappointment. In the aftermath, Sweeney said: "I am so deeply proud of this movie ... We don't always just make art for numbers, we make it for impact. And Christy has been the most impactful project of my life."

In December 2025, Sweeney co-starred opposite Amanda Seyfried in The Housemaid, an adaptation of the bestselling novel of the same name. The film was successful at the box office, and a sequel is in development with Sweeney set to return in her role. In April 2026, she reprised her role of Cassie in the third season of HBO's psychological drama series Euphoria.

==== Upcoming projects ====
Sweeney will next appear in The Custom of the Country, written and directed by Josie Rourke. Sweeney will also star in Gundam, adapted from the Japanese science fiction anime of the same name, alongside Noah Centineo. Sweeney will also reprise her role as Millie in the Paul Feig-helmed sequel The Housemaid's Secret, with Kirsten Dunst co-starring.

Sweeney is also attached to play Kim Novak in Scandalous!, a romantic drama to be directed by Colman Domingo, and Hollow, a reimagining of the 1820 short story The Legend of Sleepy Hollow, directed by Lindsey Anderson Beer and also starring Belmont Cameli.

In June 2026, Sweeney and producer Kaylee McGregor launched Honey Trap, a film and television production company. The company signed a first-look deal with Sony Pictures, under which Sweeney is expected to develop and produce multiple projects.

=== Advertising partnerships ===
Sweeney in 2025

Sweeney has formed advertising partnerships with multiple brands, including Guess, Cotton On, Miu Miu, Kérastase, Baskin-Robbins, Ford, Samsung, Crocs, and Jimmy Choo. In August 2025, The New York Times called her an "inescapable" presence in advertising.

In January 2023, she became a brand ambassador for Armani Beauty and Laneige, becoming the latter brand's first-ever global endorser. In 2024, she appeared in a commercial for Dr. Squatch body wash; in May of the following year, she partnered again with the personal care brand to launch a limited-edition soap line containing her bathwater. The videos for her Dr. Squatch campaigns went viral both times.

In January 2026, Sweeney created her own lingerie brand, SYRN, which she promoted that month by draping dozens of bras over the Hollywood sign.

==== American Eagle ====
In July 2025, Sweeney appeared in an advertising campaign for American Eagle Outfitters called "Sydney Sweeney Has Great Jeans". The ad became a subject of controversy, which The Hollywood Reporter called a "media firestorm". Some social media users, and eventually some academics, claimed that the pun on "jeans" and "genes", associated with a blonde-haired, blue-eyed white woman, promoted eugenics and white supremacy. Supporters of the campaign decried wokeness and cancel culture. The Trump administration, and eventually Donald Trump himself, commented on the affair. The New York Times, The Independent and Deadline described the controversy as being largely manufactured by conservatives, while The Atlantic and the Los Angeles Times found the reactions from both sides exaggerated. In August 2025, media analysts interviewed by CNN said that Sweeney's public image had not suffered from the affair. American Eagle Outfitters later commended the results of the campaign. Sweeney initially said she was unaffected by the controversy and declined to comment further. In December 2025, she released a statement saying "Many have assigned motives and labels to me that just aren't true", and clarifying that she was "against hate and divisiveness".

Sweeney's second campaign for American Eagle Outfitters, called "Syd for Short", was unveiled in April 2026.

==== Novig ====
In September 2026, Sweeney appeared nude in an advertisement for the sports betting website Novig. The advertisement attracted criticism from several female athletes, including gymnast Gracie Kramer, sprinter Amy Hunt, and swimmer Ariarne Titmus, for objectifying and setting back women in sports. Others supported the ad as an example of body positivity, while some in marketing described the controversy as likely intentional. Commentators described the campaign and others like it resulting in Sweeney becoming "associated with causing buzz for a brand trying to raise its profile", while some supporters described the scrutiny as a result of Sweeney's "association with the political right".

== Personal life ==
Sweeney started dating businessman Jonathan Davino in 2018, and they became engaged in 2022. They produced films together (including Anyone but You and Immaculate), and Sweeney considered Davino her "producing partner". They separated in early 2025. By June 2025, Sweeney was in a relationship with record executive Scooter Braun.

Sweeney is a car enthusiast and has restored a 1969 Ford Bronco and a 1965 Ford Mustang. As part of her partnership with Ford, Sweeney designed a custom 2024 Mustang.

In 2021, Sweeney purchased a 3,200-square-foot (300 m^{2}) Tudor-style home in Los Angeles for $3 million. In 2023, she bought a $9.9 million "fixer-upper mansion" in Los Angeles's Bel Air neighborhood, and in 2024 she bought a $13.5 million home in the Florida Keys.

== Filmography ==
Key
†	Denotes films that have not yet been released

=== Film ===
Year	Title	Role	Notes	Ref.
2010	ZMD: Zombies of Mass Destruction	Lisa		
2010	The Ward	Young Alice		
2011	Takeo	Samantha Wright	Short film	
2013	Spiders 3D	Emily Cole		
2014	Angels in Stardust	Annie		
2015	Love Made Visible	Leah	Short film	
2015	The Martial Arts Kid	Julie	Straight-to-video film	
2015	Held	Lily Woods	Short film	
2017	Dead Ant	Samantha "Sam"		
2018	Under the Silver Lake	Shooting Star #2		
2018	Along Came the Devil	Ashley Winbourne		
2018	Relentless	Ally		
2019	Big Time Adolescence	Holly		
2019	Clementine	Lana		
2019	Once Upon a Time in Hollywood	Dianne "Snake" Lake		
2020	Nocturne	Juliet Lowe		
2021	The Voyeurs	Pippa Monroe		
2021	Night Teeth	Eva		
2023	Reality	Reality Winner		
2023	Americana	Penny Jo Poplin		
2023	Anyone but You	Beatrice "Bea" Messina	Also executive producer	
2024	Madame Web	Julia Cornwall		
2024	Immaculate	Sister Cecilia	Also producer	
2024	Eden	Margret Wittmer		
2025	Echo Valley	Claire Garrett		
2025	Christy	Christy Martin	Also producer	
2025	The Housemaid	Wilhelmina "Millie" Calloway	Also executive producer	
2026	The Devil Wears Prada 2	Herself	Deleted scenes	
2027	The Housemaid's Secret †	Wilhelmina "Millie" Calloway	Also executive producer	
2027	The Custom of the Country †	Undine Spragg	Post-production; also producer	
TBA	Gundam †	TBA	Filming; also producer	

=== Television ===
Year	Title	Role	Notes	Ref.
2009	Heroes	Little Girl	Episode: "Hysterical Blindness"	
2009	Criminal Minds	Dani Forester	Episode: "Outfoxed"	
2010	Chase	Kayla Edwards	Episode: "Pilot"	
2010	90210	Girl	Episode: "How Much Is That Liam in the Window"	
2011	Kickin' It	Kelsey Vargas	Episode: "Swords and Magic"	
2011	The Bling Ring	Izzy Fishman	Television film	
2014	Grey's Anatomy	Erin Weaver	Episode: "Don't Let's Start"	
2015	Stolen from Suburbia	Emma Hudson	Television film	
2017	The Middle	Female Student #1	Episode: "The Final Final"	
2017	Pretty Little Liars	Willa	Episode: "Till Death Do Us Part"	
2018	Everything Sucks!	Emaline Addario	Main role; 10 episodes	
2018	The Handmaid's Tale	Eden Spencer	Recurring role; 7 episodes (season 2)	
2018	Sharp Objects	Alice	Miniseries; 7 episodes	
2018	The Wrong Daughter	Samantha	Television film	
2019–2026	Euphoria	Cassie Howard	Main role; 24 episodes	
2021	The White Lotus	Olivia Mossbacher	Main role; 6 episodes (season 1)	
2021–2022	Robot Chicken	Barbie / Additional voices	Voice role; 4 episodes	
2024	Saturday Night Live	Herself (host)	Episode: "Sydney Sweeney/Kacey Musgraves"	
2026	Family Guy	Sydney	Voice role; Episode: "Tall Stewie"	

=== Podcasts ===
Year	Title	Role	Notes	Ref.
2021	Strawberry Spring	Anne Bray	8 episodes	

=== Web ===
Year	Title	Role	Notes	Ref.
2017	In the Vault	Haley Caren	7 episodes	
2020	Day by Day	Winnie Chapman (voice)	Episode: "Winnie, Betty and... "	
2021	Downfalls High	Scarlett	Tickets to My Downfall album film	

=== Music video appearances ===
Year	Title	Artist	Ref.
2019	"Graveyard"	Halsey	
2023	"Angry"	The Rolling Stones	

== Awards and nominations ==
Award	Year	Category	Work / Nominee	Result	Ref.
AACTA Awards	2024	Audience Choice Award for Favourite Actress	Sydney Sweeney	Nominated	
Astra Film Awards	2026	Best Actress in a Motion Picture – Drama	Christy	Nominated	
Astra TV Awards	2022	Best Supporting Actress in a Broadcast Network or Cable Series – Drama	Euphoria	Nominated	
Astra TV Awards	2022	Best Supporting Actress in a Broadcast Network or Cable Limited or Anthology Series	The White Lotus	Nominated	
Critics' Choice Television Awards	2024	Best Actress in a Limited Series or Movie Made for Television	Reality	Nominated	
Dorian Awards	2022	Best Supporting TV Performance	Euphoria	Nominated	
Dublin Film Critics' Circle Awards	2023	Best Actress	Reality	Nominated	
Fangoria Chainsaw Awards	2024	Best Lead Performance	Immaculate	Nominated	
Gracie Awards	2024	Best Actress in a Leading Role in a Movie Made for TV	Reality	Won	
MTV Movie & TV Awards	2022	Best Performance in a Show	Euphoria	Nominated	
MTV Movie & TV Awards	2022	Best Fight (shared with Alexa Demie)	Euphoria	Won	
People's Choice Awards	2022	Drama TV Star of the Year	Euphoria	Nominated	
People's Choice Awards	2024	Comedy Movie Star of the Year	Anyone but You	Nominated	
Primetime Emmy Awards	2022	Outstanding Supporting Actress in a Drama Series	Euphoria	Nominated	
Primetime Emmy Awards	2022	Outstanding Supporting Actress in a Limited or Anthology Series or Movie	The White Lotus	Nominated	
Screen Actors Guild Awards	2019	Outstanding Performance by an Ensemble in a Drama Series	The Handmaid's Tale	Nominated	
Santa Barbara International Film Festival	2026	Virtuoso Award	Christy	Won	
Sidewalk Film Festival	2019	Special Shout Jury Mention for Acting	Clementine	Won	
Young Artist Awards	2011	Best Performance in a Short Film – Young Actress	Takeo	Nominated	
Young Artist Awards	2011	Best Performance in a TV Series – Guest Starring Young Actress 11–15	Chase	Nominated	
Young Artist Awards	2019	Best Ensemble Performance in a Streaming Series or Film	Everything Sucks!	Nominated	
