= Aloe Blacc discography =

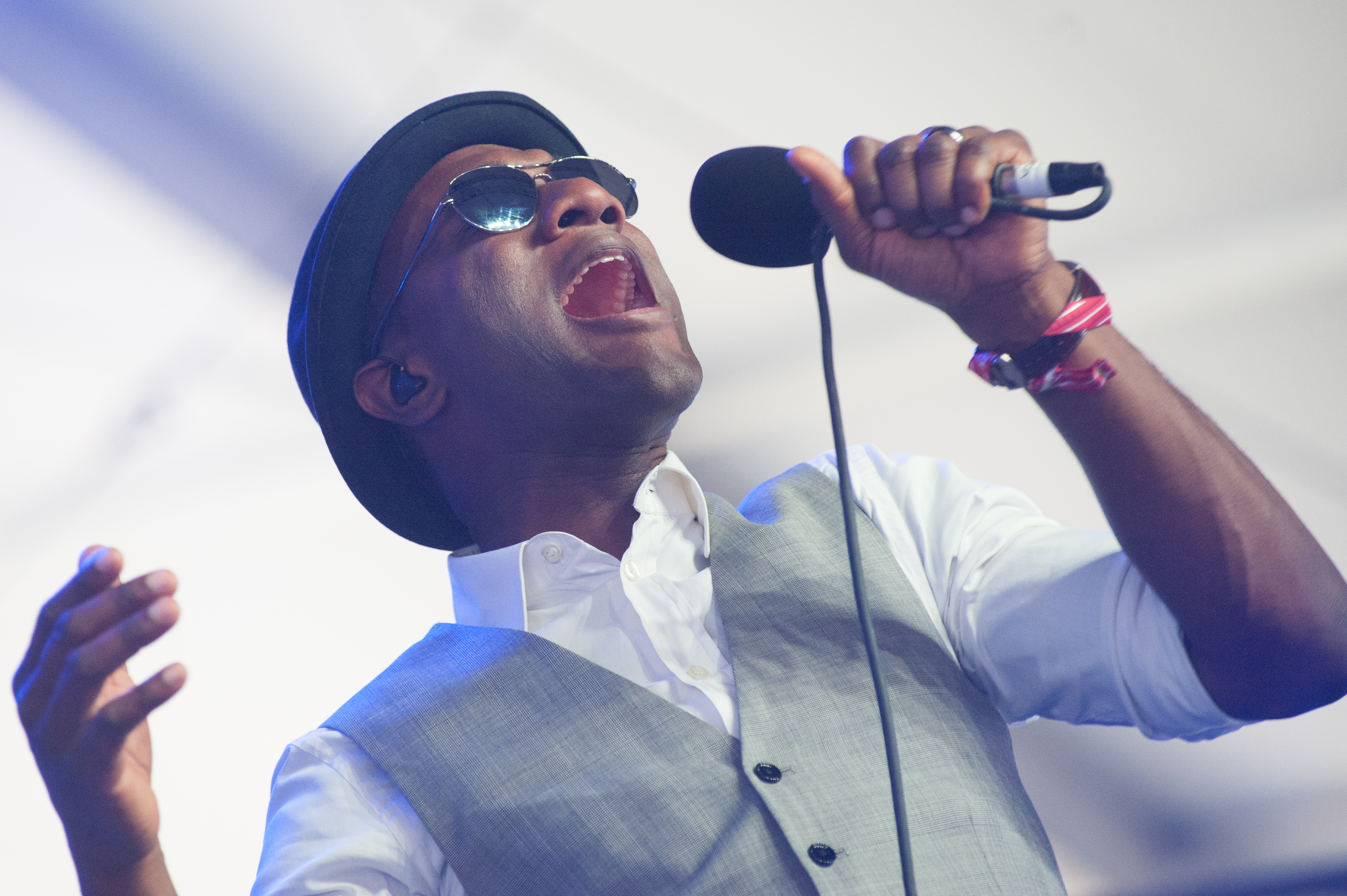
- Aloe Blacc performing at the 2014 Coachella Valley Music and Arts Festival
- Studio albums: 5
- EPs: 5
- Singles: 48

The discography of American singer Aloe Blacc consists of five studio albums, five extended plays and 47 singles. On July 11, 2006, he released his first LP album, Shine Through. He then toured across Europe and the US with Emanon, while working on his second solo album. In 2010, Blacc released his second album, Good Things, on Stones Throw records. The first single "I Need a Dollar", made major chart success in over 15 countries in Europe, peaking number 2 on the UK Singles Chart and also charting in the top 20 in Australia and New Zealand. He later released a second single from the album, "Loving You Is Killing Me" which also attained chart success in Austria, Germany and Switzerland. In 2013, Blacc collaborated with Swedish DJ/Producer Avicii on a song titled "Wake Me Up!" for the first single from Avicii's debut studio album True. Blacc partnered up with Coca-Cola in 2014 and released an exclusive charity single titled "Together (RED)". The money paid for the song was donated to AIDS research.

== Studio albums ==
List of studio albums, with selected chart positions and certifications
Title	Details	Peak chart positions										Certifications
Title	Details	US	US R&B	AUS	AUT	BEL (FL)	FRA	GER	NZ	SWI	UK	Certifications
Shine Through	Released: July 11, 2006; Label: Stones Throw; Formats: CD, LP, digital download	—	—	—	—	—	—	—	—	—	—	
Good Things	Released: September 28, 2010; Label: Stones Throw; Formats: CD, LP, digital download	—	41	22	36	5	19	29	21	31	8	BPI: Gold; IFPI AUT: Gold; BVMI: Gold
Lift Your Spirit	Released: October 25, 2013; Label: Interscope; Formats: CD, LP, digital download	4	2	19	43	33	12	16	10	22	5	
Christmas Funk	Released: November 9, 2018; Label: Independent; Formats: LP, CD, digital download	—	—	—	—	—	—	—	—	—	—	
All Love Everything	Released: October 2, 2020; Label: BMG; Formats: LP, CD, digital download	—	—	—	—	—	154	66	—	51	—	
Stand Together	Released: February 28, 2025; Label: Grand Scheme Recordings; Formats: LP, CD, digital download	—	—	—	—	—	—	—	—	—	—	
"—" denotes a recording that did not chart or was not released in that territory.

== EPs ==
List of extended plays, with selected chart positions
Title	Details	Peak chart positions
Title	Details	US
The Aloe Blacc EP	Released: 2003; Label: Ipo Wax; Formats: CD, 12"	—
The Aloe Blacc EP 2: Me and My Music	Released: September 28, 2004; Label: Ipo Wax; Formats: CD, 12"	—
Energy Live Session: Aloe Blacc & the Grand Scheme	Released: September 24, 2013; Label: Universal; Formats: Digital download	—
Wake Me Up	Released: September 24, 2013; Label: Interscope; Formats: CD, digital download	32
Christmas	Released: December 11, 2015; Label: Interscope; Formats: Digital download	—
Rock My Soul: Volume I	Released: June 7, 2024; Label: Grand Scheme Productions; Formats: Digital download	—
Rock My Soul: Volume II	Released: June 28, 2024; Label: Grand Scheme Productions; Formats: Digital download	—
Chasing Your Dream (Deluxe)	Released: October 4, 2024; Label: Self-released; Formats: Digital download	—
"—" denotes a recording that did not chart or was not released in that territory.

== Singles ==
=== As lead artist ===
List of singles as lead artist, with selected chart positions and certifications, showing year released and album name
Title	Year	Peak chart positions										Certifications	Album
Title	Year	US	US R&B	AUS	AUT	BEL	FRA	GER	NZ	SWI	UK	Certifications	Album
"Personal Business"	2003	—	—	—	—	—	—	—	—	—	—		The Aloe Blacc EP
"Want Me"	2005	—	—	—	—	—	—	—	—	—	—		Shine Through
"I'm Beautiful"	2006	—	—	—	—	—	—	—	—	—	—		Shine Through
"Dance for Life"	2006	—	—	—	—	—	—	—	—	—	—		Shine Through
"Get Down"	2006	—	—	—	—	—	—	—	—	—	—		Non-album single
"I Need a Dollar"	2010	—	— (Note: "I Need a Dollar" did not enter the Hot R&B/Hip-Hop Songs chart, but peaked at number three on the Bubbling Under R&B/Hip-Hop Singles chart, which acts as an extension to the R&B/Hip-Hop Songs chart.)	11	5	1	52	4	20	5	2	ARIA: 2× Platinum; BEA: Gold; BPI: Platinum; BVMI: 3× Gold; IFPI AUT: Gold; RMNZ: Gold	Good Things
"Femme Fatale"	2010	—	—	—	—	—	—	—	—	—	—		Good Things
"You Make Me Smile"	2010	—	—	—	—	—	—	—	—	—	—		Good Things
"Loving You Is Killing Me"	2011	—	—	—	8	62	—	12	—	26	—	BVMI: Gold; IFPI AUT: Gold	Good Things
"Green Lights"	2011	—	—	—	69	—	—	—	—	—	130		Good Things
"Wake Me Up"	2013	— (Note: "Wake Me Up" did not enter the Billboard Hot 100, but peaked at number 11 on the Bubbling Under Hot 100 chart, which acts as an extension to the Hot 100.)	—	—	71	30	20	42	—	23	69		Lift Your Spirit
"Ticking Bomb"	2013	—	—	—	—	—	—	—	—	—	—		Lift Your Spirit
"The Man"	2014	8	4	10	19	29	23	22	5	40	1	RIAA: Platinum; ARIA: Platinum; BPI: Gold; BVMI: Gold; RMNZ: Gold	Lift Your Spirit
"The World Is Ours" (with David Correy)	2014	—	—	—	—	92	—	—	—	—	—		One Love, One Rhythm
"Hello World"	2014	—	—	—	—	106	—	—	—	—	—		Lift Your Spirit (Deluxe)
"Here Today"	2014	—	—	—	—	—	—	—	—	—	—		Lift Your Spirit
"Together (RED)"	2014	—	—	—	—	—	—	—	—	—	—		Non-album singles
"Make Way"	2018	—	—	—	—	—	—	—	—	—	—		Non-album singles
"Brooklyn in the Summer"	2018	—	—	—	—	81	—	—	—	—	—		Non-album singles
"Hurt People" (with Gryffin)	2019	—	—	—	—	—	—	—	—	—	—		Gravity
"Getting Started" (from the Motion Picture Hobbs & Shaw) (featuring JID)	2019	—	—	—	—	—	—	—	—	—	—		Non-album singles
"Snitch" (with Netsky)	2019	—	—	—	—	—	—	—	— (Note: "Snitch" did not enter the NZ Top 40 Singles Chart, but peaked at number 31 on the NZ Hot Singles Chart.)	—	—		Non-album singles
"Greatest Show on Earth" (with Pegasus)	2019	—	—	—	—	—	—	—	—	54	—		Non-album singles
"I Do"	2020	—	—	—	—	—	—	—	—	—	—		All Love Everything
"My Way"	2020	—	—	—	—	—	—	—	—	—	—		All Love Everything
"Hold On Tight"	2020	—	—	—	—	—	—	—	—	—	—		All Love Everything
"My Way" (with Steve Aoki)	2020	—	—	—	—	—	—	—	—	—	—		Non-album single
"I Do" (with LeAnn Rimes)	2021	—	—	—	—	—	—	—	—	—	—		All Love Everything (Deluxe)
"Tin Cups" (with ZZ Ward)	2022	—	—	—	—	—	—	—	—	—	—		Dirty Shine
"Chasing Your Dream (Acoustic)" (with Chase Bell)	2023	—	—	—	—	—	—	—	—	—	—		Chasing Your Dream (Deluxe)
"Goodbye" (with Engelmorte)	2024	—	—	—	—	—	—	—	—	—	—		TBA
"Lonely Together" (with Vikkstar and Sickick)	2025	—	—	—	—	—	—	—	—	—	—		TBA
"In My World" (with Afrojack)	2025	—	—	—	—	38	—	—	—	—	—		TBA
"—" denotes a recording that did not chart or was not released in that territory.

=== As featured artist ===
List of singles as featured artist, with selected chart positions, showing year released and album name
Title	Year	Peak chart positions				Album
Title	Year	US	BEL	FRA	SWE	Album
"The Sag" (Dela featuring Aloe Blacc)	2008	—	—	—	—	Atmosphere Airlines, Vol.2
"Where I'm From" (MED featuring Aloe Blacc)	2010	—	—	—	—	Classic
"Days Chasing Days" (Blame One featuring Exile, Aloe Blacc and Beleaf)	2011	—	—	—	—	Days Chasing Days
"The Sound of Swing (Oh Na Na)" (The Kenneth Bager Experience featuring Aloe Blacc)	2011	—	—	—	—	Non-album single
"Where Does the Time Go?" (The Bamboos featuring Aloe Blacc)	2012	—	67	—	—	Medicine Man
"Time to Go" (Wax Tailor featuring Aloe Blacc)	2012	—	95	—	—	Dusty Rainbow from the Dark
"More Than Material" (Roseaux featuring Aloe Blacc)	2012	—	—	80	—	Roseaux
"Show Me the Way" (Dilated Peoples featuring Aloe Blacc)	2014	—	—	—	—	Directors of Photography
"Something to Believe In" (Fashawn featuring Nas and Aloe Blacc)	2015	—	—	—	—	The Ecology
"Verge" (Owl City featuring Aloe Blacc)	2015	—	—	—	—	Mobile Orchestra
"Candyman" (Zedd featuring Aloe Blacc)	2016	—	—	—	—	Non-album singles
"Smile" (Maya Jupiter featuring Aloe Blacc)	2016	—	—	—	—	Non-album singles
"Counting On Me" (Aeroplane and Purple Disco Machine featuring Aloe Blacc)	2016	—	—	—	—	Non-album singles
"S.O.S (Sound of Swing)" (Kenneth Bager vs. Yolanda Be Cool featuring Aloe Blacc)	2016	—	—	—	—	Non-album singles
"Imperfection" (Gentleman featuring Aloe Blacc)	2017	—	—	—	—	Non-album singles
"Secrets" (Engine-EarZ Experiment featuring Aloe Blacc and Ayanna Witter-Johnson)	2017	—	—	—	—	Symbol
"Carry You Home" (Tiësto featuring Stargate and Aloe Blacc)	2017	—	—	—	—	Club Life, Vol. 5 - China
"Milk & Honey" (Tropkillaz featuring Aloe Blacc)	2018	—	—	—	—	Non-album single
"SOS" (Avicii featuring Aloe Blacc)	2019	68	2	93	1	Tim
"Truth Never Lies" (Lost Frequencies featuring Aloe Blacc)	2019	—	—	—	—	Alive and Feeling Fine
"Never Be Alone" (David Guetta and Morten featuring Aloe Blacc)	2019	—	—	—	—	Non-album single
"Better Than Ever" (Flight Facilities featuring Aloe Blacc)	2019	—	—	—	—	Non-album single
"Better Day" (Young Bombs featuring Aloe Blacc)	2019	—	—	—	—	The Young Bombs Show
"Dont Worry" (Mesto featuring Aloe Blacc)	2019	—	—	—	—	Non-album singles
"I'm In Love" (Paul Oakenfold featuring Aloe Blacc)	2021	—	—	—	—	Non-album singles
"Set Me Free" (Dvbbs featuring Aloe Blacc)	2021	—	—	—	—	Sleep
"Can't Get Over You" (Gabry Ponte featuring Aloe Blacc)	2021	—	—	—	—	Non-album single
"—" denotes a recording that did not chart or was not released in that territory.

== Guest appearances ==
List of non-single guest appearances, with other performing artists, showing year released and album name
Title	Year	Other artist(s)	Album
"Live Your Life"	2006	Deep Rooted	The Second Coming
"Vida"	2012	Max Herre	Hallo Welt!
"So wundervoll"	2012	Max Herre	Hallo Welt!
"Strange Things"	2012	Roseaux	Roseaux
"If You Didn't Love Me (Don't Go Away)"	2012	Roseaux	Roseaux
"Walking on the Moon"	2012	Roseaux	Roseaux
"Girl You Rock My Soul"	2012	Roseaux	Roseaux
"We All Must Live Together"	2012	Roseaux	Roseaux
"Clarao Da Lua"	2012	Roseaux	Roseaux
"Indifference"	2012	Roseaux	Roseaux
"Try Me"	2012	Roseaux	Roseaux
"Missing You"	2012	Roseaux	Roseaux
"If You Didn't Love Me (Don't Go Away) [Winter Outro]"	2012	Roseaux	Roseaux
"Danger Zone"	2013	Marcelo D2	Nada Pode Me Parar
"That Spirit of Christmas"	2015	LeAnn Rimes	Today Is Christmas
"Wrote My Way Out"	2016	Nas, Dave East, Lin-Manuel Miranda	The Hamilton Mixtape
"Body Language"	2017	Tennyson	Uh Oh EP
"Things We Say"	2017	Blu & Exile	In the Beginning: Before the Heavens
"12 Days of Christmas"	2017	Colbie Caillat	A Bad Moms Christmas (Original Motion Picture Soundtrack)

Aloe Blacc released the song “Chasing Your Dream” (Acoustic) and subsequent Deluxe versions alongside Chase Bell in 2023 and performed this song at XPRIZE Envisioneering and Abundance 360 2023 and 2024 respectively. Xprize Foundation
