= Black-ish season 8 =

Black-ish
- Season 8
- Promotional poster
- Starring: Anthony Anderson; Tracee Ellis Ross; Marcus Scribner; Miles Brown; Marsai Martin; Peter Mackenzie; Deon Cole; Jeff Meacham; Katlyn Nichol; Jenifer Lewis
- No. of episodes: 13

Release
- Original network: ABC
- Original release: January 4 – April 19, 2022

Season chronology
- ← Previous; Season 7

The eighth and final season of the American sitcom Black-ish premiered on January 4, 2022, on ABC, for the 2021–22 television season and concluded on April 19, 2022.

Black-ish centers around the African-American Johnson family, led by Andre "Dre" Johnson, who struggles with finding his cultural identity while raising his kids in a white neighborhood with his wife, Bow. The series stars Anthony Anderson as Dre, alongside Tracee Ellis Ross, Marcus Scribner, Miles Brown, Marsai Martin, Peter Mackenzie, Deon Cole, Jeff Meacham, Katlyn Nichol, and Jenifer Lewis.

== Cast and characters ==
=== Main ===
- Anthony Anderson as Andre "Dre" Johnson
- Tracee Ellis Ross as Rainbow "Bow" Johnson
- Marcus Scribner as Andre ("Junior") Johnson Jr.
- Miles Brown as Jack Johnson
- Marsai Martin as Diane Johnson
- Peter Mackenzie as Leslie Stevens
- Deon Cole as Charlie Telphy
- Jeff Meacham as Josh Oppenhol
- Katlyn Nichol as Olivia Lockhart
- Jenifer Lewis as Ruby Johnson

=== Recurring cast ===
- Laurence Fishburne as Earl "Pops" Johnson
- Yara Shahidi as Zoey Johnson
- Nicole Sullivan as Janine
- Reid Scott as Griffin

=== Guest cast ===
- Michelle Obama as herself
- Stephen A. Smith as himself
- Dwight Howard as himself
- DeAndre Jordan as himself
- Magic Johnson as himself
- Montrezl Harrell as himself
- Vivica A. Fox as herself
- Daveed Diggs as Johan Johnson
- Babyface as himself
- Anna Deavere Smith as Alicia Johnson
- Simone Biles as herself

== Episodes ==
No. overall	No. in season	Title	Directed by	Written by	Original release date	Prod. code	U.S. viewers (millions)
164	1	"That's What Friends Are For"	Jude Weng	Laura Gutin Peterson	January 4, 2022	811	2.75
Michelle Obama meets the Johnsons.
165	2	"The Natural"	Linda Mendoza	Christian Lander	January 11, 2022	805	1.98
Dre wants to make anything in order to be promoted. Meanwhile, Diane gets a new friend.
166	3	"Bow-Mo"	Natalia Anderson	Melanie Boysaw	January 18, 2022	802	2.05
Dre humiliates himself in front of Diane, while calling a radio. Bow finds a cool clique.
167	4	"Hoop Dreams"	Todd Biermann	Lizzie Donaldson	January 25, 2022	809	2.14
Jack's new job quickly gets on his head. Meanwhile, Junior and Olivia help Pops and Ruby whose couple become too routine addicted.
168	5	"Ashy to Classy"	Kevin Bray	Edgar Momplaisir	February 1, 2022	801	1.97
Dre and Bow disagree about educating Devante. Meanwhile, Jr helps Jack with the picture of him for his class picture.
169	6	"Mom Mentor"	Ryan Case	Esa Lewis	February 8, 2022	803	1.84
Bow helps Junior to convince Olivia to go in the same university than him. Jack and Diane are outraged about how Dre inspires from familial stories in order to make his business.
170	7	"Sneakers by the Dozen"	Toby Burge	Isaiah Lester	February 15, 2022	806	1.64
Diane skips school while Dre discovers his colleague has more sneakers in his closet.
171	8	"My Work-Friend's Wedding"	Shiri Appleby	Julia Wiener	February 22, 2022	812	2.03
Charlie invites everybody to his wedding, except Diane.
172	9	"And the Winner Is..."	Stacey Muhammad	Graham Towers & Ben Deeb	March 22, 2022	807	1.67
Dre has a hard choice to make. Jr crosses roads with Olivia again.
173	10	"Young, Gifted and Black"	Pete Chatmon	Keisha Ansley	March 29, 2022	804	1.82
Dre and Bow discover that Devante could be gifted. Jr is devastated after his break-up from Olivia.
174	11	"The (Almost) Last Dance"	Rob Sweeney	Story by : Courtney Lilly & Tracee Ellis Ross; Teleplay by : Courtney Lilly	April 5, 2022	808	1.88
Pops and Ruby plan to move out. Bow has started menopause.
175	12	"If a Black Man Cries in the Woods..."	Iona Morris	Robb Chavis	April 12, 2022	810	2.16
As Dre, Jr and Pops go on their hunting trip, old injuries open up again. Jack and Diane have to choose a university to go to.
176	13	"Homegoing"	Anton L. Cropper	Steve White	April 19, 2022	813	2.52
In the series finale, after eight years of highs and lows, the Johnsons consider making some life changes as well as they move from Sherman Oaks to a big house in Baldwin Hills. In the final scene, a Hispanic couple moves in to the Johnson's former home and just like Dre and Bow are happily living the American Dream, but things get awkward after Janine welcomes the couple.

== Production ==
=== Development ===
On May 14, 2021, it was announced that ABC had renewed Black-ish for an eighth and final season. Production on the series had concluded by December 2021.

=== Casting ===
On October 28, 2021, it was announced that Michelle Obama would guest-star in an episode of the season as herself. Obama's appearance was later revealed to be in the season premiere, "That's What Friends Are For".

== Marketing and Release ==
When ABC announced their fall schedule for 2022, it was revealed that the series would be held for mid-season. On November 1, 2021, it was announced that would premiere on January 4, 2022. The season airs after first seasons of Judge Steve Harvey and Abbott Elementary, and lead into first season of Queens. A retro-style promo for the season was aired during the third installment of Live in Front of a Studio Audience, on December 7, 2021. The promotional poster for the season was released in November 2021.

== Ratings ==
Viewership and ratings per episode of Black-ish season 8
No.	Title	Air date	Rating/share (18–49)	Viewers (millions)	DVR (18–49)	DVR viewers (millions)	Total (18–49)	Total viewers (millions)
1	"That's What Friends Are For"	January 4, 2022	0.5	2.75	TBD	TBD	TBD	TBD
2	"The Natural"	January 11, 2022	0.4	1.98	TBD	TBD	TBD	TBD
3	"Bow-Mo"	January 18, 2022	0.4	2.05	TBD	TBD	TBD	TBD
4	"Hoop Dreams"	January 25, 2022	0.4	2.14	TBD	TBD	TBD	TBD
5	"Ashy to Classy"	February 1, 2022	0.4	1.97	TBD	TBD	TBD	TBD
6	"Mom Mentor"	February 8, 2022	0.4	1.84	TBD	TBD	TBD	TBD
7	"Sneakers by the Dozen"	February 15, 2022	0.3	1.64	TBD	TBD	TBD	TBD
8	"My Work-Friend's Wedding"	February 22, 2022	0.4	2.03	TBD	TBD	TBD	TBD
9	"And the Winner Is..."	March 22, 2022	0.3	1.67	TBD	TBD	TBD	TBD
10	"Young, Gifted and Black"	March 29, 2022	0.3	1.82	TBD	TBD	TBD	TBD
11	"The (Almost) Last Dance"	April 5, 2022	0.3	1.88	TBD	TBD	TBD	TBD
12	"If a Black Man Cries in the Woods..."	April 12, 2022	0.4	2.16	TBD	TBD	TBD	TBD
13	"Homegoing"	April 19, 2022	0.4	2.52	TBD	TBD	TBD	TBD
