= Black-ish season 1 =

Black-ish
- Season 1
- DVD cover
- No. of episodes: 24

Release
- Original network: ABC
- Original release: September 24, 2014 – May 20, 2015

Season chronology
- Next → Season 2

The first season of the television comedy series Black-ish aired between September 24, 2014, and May 20, 2015, on ABC in the United States. It was produced by Khalabo Ink Society, Wilmore Films, Cinema Gypsy Productions and Principato-Young Entertainment, with creator Kenya Barris, who also served as executive producer alongside Anthony Anderson, Brian Dobbins, Jonathan Groff and Helen Sugland.

The series revolves around Dre, portrayed by Anthony Anderson, a family man who struggles with finding his cultural identity while raising his kids in a white neighborhood. He lives with his wife, Bow (Tracee Ellis Ross) and his kids Zoey (Yara Shahidi), Andre Jr (Marcus Scribner), and twins Jack (Miles Brown) and Diane (Marsai Martin).

After only airing six episodes, ABC ordered a full season of 24 episodes. It was renewed for a second season on May 8, 2015.

The pilot episode premiered to a total of 11.04 million viewers, ranking number 1 in its time slot. It garnered 3.3/10 adults 18-49.

== Cast ==
=== Main cast ===
- Anthony Anderson as Andre 'Dre' Johnson
- Tracee Ellis Ross as Rainbow 'Bow' Johnson
- Yara Shahidi as Zoey Johnson
- Marcus Scribner as Andre 'Junior' Johnson Jr.
- Miles Brown as Jack Johnson
- Marsai Martin as Diane Johnson

=== Recurring cast ===
- Laurence Fishburne as Earl "Pops" Johnson
- Jenifer Lewis as Ruby Johnson
- Peter Mackenzie as Leslie Stevens
- Jeff Meacham as Josh Oppenhol
- Deon Cole as Charlie Telphy
- Edi Patterson as Laura
- Allen Maldonado as Curtis
- Nick Carson as Zach
- Jennie Pierson as Ms. Davis

=== Guest cast ===
- Nicole Sullivan as Janine
- Ken Jenkins as Bernie
- Ana Ortiz as Angelica
- Richard Riehle as Solomon
- Julian de la Celle as Andre from Marseille
- Mindy Sterling as Pamela
- Beau Bridges as Paul
- Anna Deavere Smith as Alicia Johnson
- Jermaine Dupri as himself
- Maury Povich as himself
- Jerry Minor as Lance
- Lindsay Price as Maisie
- Mara Marini as Shawn
- Michael Rapaport as Jay Simmons
- Raven-Symoné as Rhonda Johnson
- Elle Young as Sharon
- Bill Maher as himself
- Mary J. Blige as Mirabelle
- Sean "Diddy" Combs as Elroy Savoy

== Episodes ==
No. overall	No. in season	Title	Directed by	Written by	Original release date	Prod. code	U.S. viewers (millions)
1	1	"Pilot"	James Griffiths	Kenya Barris	September 24, 2014	101	11.04
Advertising exec Dre looks forward to a promotion that would make him the first African American senior vice president at his firm, but he worries that there is a price to pay for his success when his son Andre Jr. announces that for his 13th birthday he's converting to Judaism in order to have a Bar Mitzvah like all his friends.
2	2	"The Talk"	Rebecca Asher	Vijal Patel	October 1, 2014	103	8.29
Dre insists on giving Andre Jr. "the talk," a decision he soon comes to regret when he's inundated with nonstop questions about sex from his curious son.
3	3	"The Nod"	James Griffiths	Kenya Barris	October 8, 2014	104	7.93
Dre is on a mission to get Andre Jr. to become friends with more black kids after learning his son is clueless about "the nod." Meanwhile, Rainbow wants to inspire little Diane to become a doctor, and so she takes her to work at the hospital on what ends up being a really bad day.
4	4	"Crazy Mom"	James Griffiths	Gail Lerner	October 15, 2014	102	6.93
Dre takes over Rainbow's "mom" duties for a week and the overwhelming praise he receives from everyone at his kids' school ends up going to his head to the point where he finds himself going overboard not to be outdone by anyone, including the school's "crazy mom."
5	5	"Crime and Punishment"	Claire Scanlon	Corey Nickerson	October 22, 2014	105	7.95
The kids fear that an act of disobedience by Jack could lead to Dre and Rainbow going back on their word and reinstating spanking.
6	6	"The Prank King"	Matt Sohn	Lindsey Shockley	October 29, 2014	106	7.67
Dre worries that his older kids are going to ruin his Halloween fun by refusing to take part in the Johnson tradition of seeing who can pull the most outlandish pranks on each other.
7	7	"The Gift of Hunger"	Victor Nelli, Jr.	Peter Saji	November 12, 2014	108	7.78
It's reality check time for the Johnson kids courtesy of Dre, who decides that his children have become spoiled after they turn their noses up at his favorite cheap restaurant in his old hood. To remedy the situation, Andre Jr. and Zoey are forced to take jobs at his office, while Jack and Diane try to make money around the neighborhood, which, to Bow's embarrassment, leads to rumors about the family falling on hard times.
8	8	"Oedipal Triangle"	Rebecca Asher	Vijal Patel	November 19, 2014	109	7.82
Dre receives a lot of love from his mom when she pays the Johnsons a visit, and some grief from Bow, who doesn't get along with her mother-in-law, although Dre's determined to change that.
9	9	"Colored Commentary"	Ken Whittingham	Yvette Lee Bowser	December 3, 2014	110	6.82
Dre wants "Team Johnson" to feel more connected and have each other's backs, but ends up creating a problem for himself when he falls short of Bow's expectations. Meanwhile, Zoey and Andre Jr. are tasked with babysitting the twins, a job they would rather not do.
10	10	"Black Santa/White Christmas"	Elliot Hegarty	Gail Lerner	December 10, 2014	111	7.28
Certain that his annual office Christmas party needs a black Santa, Dre goes out of his way to fill the red suit, even though the head of HR already got the job. Meanwhile, Bow doesn't feel like competing with Ruby over who cooks the big holiday dinner.
11	11	"Law of Attraction"	Michael Schultz	Corey Nickerson	January 7, 2015	113	6.23
Dre worries that his machismo is being questioned by Rainbow after another man dismisses him in front of her. This leads to Pops helping his son save face and, in the process, opening the door to another chance with Ruby. Elsewhere, the school play takes a turn for the awkward when Jr. and Zoey are cast as the romantic leads in "Romeo and Juliet."
12	12	"Martin Luther Skiing Day"	Stuart McDonald	Lindsey Shockley	January 14, 2015	114	6.51
Dre decides to teach his kids the importance of Dr. Martin Luther King Jr. while on their annual MLK holiday ski trip; and for Junior, this means a unique lesson on intolerance in the real world—or in his case, the ski lodge.
13	13	"Big Night, Big Fight"	Rebecca Asher	Vijal Patel	February 11, 2015	115	6.83
Dre vows to make Valentine's Day a romantic success, even though most years he and Rainbow end up quarreling; and Diane comes to the conclusion that she is too critical and accepts help from her siblings learning how to give a compliment.
14	14	"Andre From Marseille"	Phil Traill	David Hemingson	February 18, 2015	107	6.40
Dre takes an instant dislike to Zoey's first serious boyfriend, a worldly teen from France.
15	15	"The Dozens"	Millicent Shelton	Peter Saji	February 25, 2015	116	6.63
Dre teaches Andre Jr. how to trash-talk a school bully; Diane is afraid of the dark. In the last trash-talk of the episode, Dre calls Junior "Raven Symone with a fade"; Raven-Symoné would go on to guest star as Dre's sister in episode 22.
16	16	"Parental Guidance"	Michael Schultz	Corey Nickerson	March 4, 2015	118	6.72
Dre, determined to make up for the no-frills, last-minute wedding he and Bow had, organizes an amazing vow renewal for their 15th anniversary. But when Bow’s hippie-dippy parents, Alicia and the very white Paul show up unannounced -- bombshells are dropped and old disagreements re-ignite between the two families, especially with Pops and Ruby.
17	17	"30 Something"	John Fortenberry	Courtney Lilly	March 25, 2015	112	6.34
When Dre is about to turn forty, he tries to prove he is still young at heart.
18	18	"Sex, Lies and Vasectomies"	Matt Sohn	Gail Lerner	April 1, 2015	120	7.43
Bow tricks Dre into thinking she's pregnant so he'll admit he didn't get his vasectomy. Meanwhile Jack and Diane try to be the babies while they can and Junior tries many attempts to get the baby to like him for him.
19	19	"The Real World"	Victor Nelli, Jr.	Scott Weinger	April 8, 2015	117	6.09
Bow invites her college friends to the house to impress them, including her ex-boyfriend. The kids try to shoot an episode of a reality show.
20	20	"Switch Hitting"	Ken Whittingham	Kenya Barris	April 22, 2015	119	6.57
A new executive questions Dre's blackness, which makes him do everything possible to prove him wrong.
21	21	"The Peer-ent Trap"	Ken Whittingham	Yvette Lee Bowser	April 29, 2015	121	5.94
Dre and Bow decide on their own how to handle Zoey after Dre sets new rules in the house rules (mostly for Zoey) and Jr. teaches Jack and Diane loopholes around the rules.
22	22	"Please Don't Ask, Please Don't Tell"	Victor Nelli, Jr.	Peter Saji	May 6, 2015	122	6.89
Dre's sister, guest starring Raven-Symoné, doesn't feel comfortable telling her parents she's a lesbian and Dre tries to help his own way.
23	23	"Elephant in the Room"	Anton Cropper	Courtney Lilly	May 13, 2015	123	6.14
Andre Jr. meets a girl in the Young Republicans club, which throws the liberal Dre and Bow for a loop. Diane gets jealous when Dre gives Zoey a cool nickname when she gets glasses.
24	24	"Pops' Pops' Pops"	Jonathan Groff	Vijal Patel	May 20, 2015	124	5.36
Jack and Diane find a scrapbook of Pops when he was a kid and he tells them a story about it from the 1920s.

== Reception ==
=== Ratings ===
Viewership and ratings per episode of Black-ish season 1
No.	Title	Air date	Rating/share (18–49)	Viewers (millions)	DVR (18–49)	DVR viewers (millions)	Total (18–49)	Total viewers (millions)
1	"Pilot"	September 24, 2014	3.3/10	11.04	1.5	3.70	4.8	14.55
2	"The Talk"	October 1, 2014	2.6/8	8.29	TBD	TBD	TBD	
3	"The Nod"	October 8, 2014	2.9/8	7.93	TBD	TBD	TBD	
4	"Crazy Mom"	October 15, 2014	2.5/7	6.93	TBD	TBD	TBD	
5	"Crime and Punishment"	October 22, 2014	2.4/7	7.95	TBD	TBD	TBD	
6	"The Prank King"	October 29, 2014	2.7/7	7.67	1.1	TBD	3.8	
7	"The Gift of Hunger"	November 12, 2014	2.5/7	7.78	1.4	3.11	3.9	10.89
8	"Oedipal Triangle"	November 19, 2014	2.6/8	7.82	1.0	TBD	3.6	
9	"Colored Commentary"	December 3, 2014	2.1/6	6.82	1.1	2.68	3.2	9.50
10	"Black Santa/White Christmas"	December 10, 2014	2.3/7	7.28	1.2	2.79	3.5	10.08
11	"Law of Attraction"	January 7, 2015	2.1/6	6.23	1.0	2.48	3.1	8.71
12	"Martin Luther Skiing Day"	January 14, 2015	1.9/6	6.51	1.0	2.46	2.9	8.97
13	"Big Night, Big Fight"	February 11, 2015	2.1/6	6.83	TBD	TBD	TBD	
14	"Andre From Marseille"	February 18, 2015	2.2/6	6.40	TBD	TBD	TBD	
15	"The Dozens"	February 25, 2015	2.2/6	6.63	TBD	TBD	TBD	
16	"Parental Guidance"	March 4, 2015	2.3/6	6.72	TBD	TBD	TBD	
17	"30 Something"	March 25, 2015	2.1/7	6.34	TBD	TBD	TBD	
18	"Sex, Lies and Vasectomies"	April 1, 2015	2.4/8	7.43	TBD	TBD	TBD	
19	"The Real World"	April 8, 2015	1.9/6	6.09	TBD	TBD	TBD	TBD
20	"Switch Hitting"	April 22, 2015	2.1/6	6.57	TBD	TBD	TBD	
21	"The Peer-ent Trap"	April 29, 2015	2.0/6	5.94	TBD	TBD	TBD	
22	"Please Don't Ask, Please Don't Tell"	May 6, 2015	2.2/7	6.89	TBD	TBD	TBD	
23	"Elephant in the Room"	May 13, 2015	2.0/6	6.14	TBD	TBD	TBD	
24	"Pops' Pops' Pops"	May 20, 2015	1.6/5	5.36	TBD	TBD	TBD	

=== Accolades ===
Year	Award	Category	Recipient(s)	Result	Ref.
2015	American Film Institute	Top 10 TV Shows	Black-ish	Won	
2015	People's Choice Awards	Favorite New TV Comedy	Black-ish	Nominated	
2015	NAACP Image Awards	Outstanding Comedy Series	Black-ish	Won	
2015	NAACP Image Awards	Outstanding Actor in a Comedy Series	Anthony Anderson	Won	
2015	NAACP Image Awards	Outstanding Actress in a Comedy Series	Tracee Ellis Ross	Won	
2015	NAACP Image Awards	Outstanding Supporting Actress in a Comedy Series	Yara Shahidi	Won	
2015	NAACP Image Awards	Outstanding Supporting Actor in a Comedy Series	Laurence Fishburne	Won	
2015	NAACP Image Awards	Outstanding Supporting Actor in a Comedy Series	Marcus Scribner	Nominated	
2015	Critics' Choice Television Awards	Best Actor in a Comedy Series	Anthony Anderson	Nominated	
2015	Teen Choice Awards	Choice TV Actor: Comedy	Anthony Anderson	Nominated	
2015	Teen Choice Awards	Choice TV: Breakout Star	Yara Shahidi	Nominated	
2015	Teen Choice Awards	Choice TV: Breakout Show	Black-ish	Nominated	
2015	Primetime Emmy Award	Outstanding Lead Actor in a Comedy Series	Anthony Anderson	Nominated	
