= Black-ish season 2 =

Black-ish
- Season 2
- Promotional poster
- No. of episodes: 24

Release
- Original network: ABC
- Original release: September 23, 2015 – May 18, 2016

Season chronology
- ← Previous; Season 1 Next → Season 3

The second season of Black-ish aired from September 23, 2015 to May 18, 2016, on ABC in the United States. It is produced by Khalabo Ink Society, Cinema Gypsy Productions, Principato-Young Entertainment and ABC Studios, with creator Kenya Barris, who also served as executive producer alongside Anthony Anderson, Brian Dobbins, Jonathan Groff and Helen Sugland.

The series revolves around Dre, portrayed by Anderson, a family man who struggles with finding his cultural identity while raising his kids in a white neighborhood. He lives with his wife, Bow (Tracee Ellis Ross).

On March 3, 2016, ABC renewed the series for a third season.

== Cast ==
=== Main cast ===
- Anthony Anderson as Dre Johnson
- Tracee Ellis Ross as Bow Johnson
- Yara Shahidi as Zoey Johnson
- Marcus Scribner as Andre ("Junior") Johnson Jr.
- Miles Brown as Jack Johnson
- Marsai Martin as Diane Johnson
- Jeff Meacham as Josh Oppenhol
- Jenifer Lewis as Ruby Johnson

=== Recurring cast ===
- Laurence Fishburne as Earl "Pops" Johnson
- Peter Mackenzie as Leslie Stevens
- Deon Cole as Charlie Telphy
- Allen Maldonado as Curtis
- Wanda Sykes as Daphne Lido
- Nicole Sullivan as Janine
- Catherine Reitman as Lucy

=== Guest cast ===
- Kent Faulcon as Principal Green
- Andrew Daly as Dr. Evan Windsor
- Zendaya as Resheida
- Marc Evan Jackson as David Cooper
- Beth Lacke as Andrea Cooper
- Michael Strahan as June Bug
- Amber Rose as Dominique
- Barry Shabaka Henley as T Jackson
- Keraun Harris as Smoke
- Faizon Love as Sha
- Tyra Banks as Gigi
- Mindy Sterling as Pam
- LaMonica Garrett as Davis
- John Witherspoon as James Brown
- Anna Deavere Smith as Alicia
- Toby Huss as Nelson
- Brittany Daniel as Blair
- Don Lemon as himself
- Bumper Robinson as Marcus Montgomery
- Sayeed Shahidi as Adonis Culpepper
- Regina Hall as Vivian
- Raven-Symoné as Rhonda Johnson
- Phil Morris as Frank Duckworth
- Valarie Pettiford as Donna Duckworth
- Nat Faxon as Joseph Everton

== Episodes ==
No. overall	No. in season	Title	Directed by	Written by	Original release date	Prod. code	U.S. viewers (millions)
25	1	"THE Word"	Matt Sohn	Kenya Barris	September 23, 2015	202	7.30
After Jack, performing Kanye West's "Gold Digger" at his school talent show, raps the N-word (from the line "Now I ain't saying she's a gold digger / but she ain't messing with no broke niggas"), he is threatened with expulsion from the school.
26	2	"Rock, Paper, Scissors, Gun"	Ken Whittingham	Peter Saji	September 30, 2015	201	5.94
After a neighbor's house is broken into, Dre considers getting a gun, and Bow tries to convince him not to buy one. Zoey asks Pops to teach her karate, but she ends up doing his chores, a la The Karate Kid.
27	3	"Dr. Hell No"	Millicent Shelton	Gail Lerner	October 7, 2015	203	5.86
Pops reveals he has not been to the doctor since 1985, which leads to him not knowing that he has a clogged artery. The kids wonder what would happen to Pops' stuff if he were to die.
28	4	"Daddy's Day"	Michael Schultz	Vijal Patel	October 14, 2015	204	5.66
After realizing the kids like Bow more than him, Dre decides to create a new holiday, "Daddy's Day." Dre decides to teach Zoey's friend, Rasheida (Zendaya) how to drive with disastrous results.
29	5	"Churched"	Victor Nelli, Jr.	Corey Nickerson	October 21, 2015	205	5.79
Determined to say "yes" to more invitations, Dre accidentally commits a reluctant Johnson family to church on Sunday. When Rainbow and Dre attempt to back out (for "cultural" reasons), things backfire horribly. Meanwhile, Ruby discovers that the twins were never baptized and seeks to remedy to the situation, much to Jack's relief and Diane's dislike.
30	6	"Jacked o' Lantern"	Christine Gernon	Jenifer Rice-Genzuk Henry	October 28, 2015	206	6.18
It is halloween at the Johnson's house, so Andre's cousin, June Bug (Michael Strahan), comes to continue the family tradition of beating up on Dre and his side of the family. The kids decide to fight back against Andre's nieces and nephews, learning a lesson in the process.
31	7	"Charlie in Charge"	Matt Sohn	Lindsey Shockley	November 11, 2015	207	5.97
In an effort to get Zoe interested in her alma mater, Rainbow flies her and a flight phobic Dre to Rhode Island. In the meantime, a phone call from a semi-sedated Dre accidentally leaves Charlie in charge of the remaining Johnson kids.
32	8	"Chop Shop"	John Putch	Hale Rothstein	November 18, 2015	208	6.08
A disastrous haircut leaves Dre questioning his life-long loyalty to his barber. Meanwhile, Ruby attempts to take over Rainbow's management of the Johnson family Christmas card.
33	9	"Man at Work"	Kevin Bray	Vijal Patel	December 2, 2015	210	5.45
Daphne Lido (Wanda Sykes), ex-wife of founding partner Phillip Lido, announces she got her husband's share of Stevens & Lido in the divorce. Upon assessing the staff, she deems Charlie to be dead weight and orders Dre to fire him. Meanwhile, Rainbow questions Dre's loyalty to his childhood friend Sha, who she says is taking advantage of his generosity. Note: On Hulu, there is also an extended version of the episode titled "Man at Work: Extended Cut", which contains an additional 9 minutes.
34	10	"Stuff"	Ken Whittingham	Corey Nickerson	December 9, 2015	211	5.97
Pops hints that the Johnson kids are spoiled and tells a story about him and his siblings getting only one present at Christmas. Dre shrugs it off until he hears his kids' ridiculous demands, so he announces they will all get one present only. The kids then resolve to be extra nice and helpful to get Dad to change his mind.
35	11	"Plus Two Isn't a Thing"	Victor Nelli, Jr.	Njeri Brown & Lisa McQuillan	January 6, 2016	212	6.29
Dre's strange relationship with his best friend from childhood, pop star Gigi (Tyra Banks), has Rainbow feeling left out until she tries to spend a few days of her own as Dre's best friend. Meanwhile, inspired by "Aunt" Gigi, the kids try to make a music video.
36	12	"Old Digger"	Linda Mendoza	Steven White	January 13, 2016	209	6.06
Dre is less than pleased when Ruby decides to get back in the dating game with a man half her age. Meanwhile Zoe, Dianne and Jack try to convince Junior that he is being catfished.
37	13	"Keeping Up With the Johnsons"	Millicent Shelton	Courtney Lilly	January 20, 2016	213	5.72
When an unwelcome credit card bill leaves Dre and Bow realizing that it is time to cut expenses, Junior and Jack decide to try a get-rich-quick scheme, using a reluctant Zoe as inspiration.
38	14	"Sink or Swim"	Michael Schultz	Gail Lerner	February 10, 2016	214	6.02
Dre thinks his neighbors are being racist by not inviting the Johnsons to their pool parties, even though he cannot swim. Meanwhile, both Bow and Ruby have some lessons for the kids.
39	15	"Twindependence"	Michael Spiller	Peter Saji	February 17, 2016	216	5.74
Diane is tired of being Jack's twin, so she tries to get rid of him. After discovering how much she likes him, she changes her mind. Dre buys Zoey a car, but then reconsiders after speaking to his colleagues.
40	16	"Hope"	Beth McCarthy-Miller	Kenya Barris	February 24, 2016	217	6.18
After watching breaking news coverage regarding the indictment of a police officer, Andre and Rainbow teach Jack and Diane the history of discriminatory brutality. Junior tries to sneak down to the protests, but Zoey convinces him to change his mind.
41	17	"Any Given Saturday"	Gail Mancuso	Yvette Lee Bowser	March 16, 2016	218	6.12
Jack is a star in recreational basketball, but when Dre and Bow learn about travel ball, a much more serious league where all the pros start out, they find a way to get Jack in. The kids are much more talented than Jack is used to, and to Dre and Bow's dismay, he becomes a bench warmer. Meanwhile, Junior becomes a referee and takes his new responsibilities a little too far, while Zoey meets a new love interest on the court.
42	18	"Black Nanny"	Anton Cropper	Lindsey Shockley	March 23, 2016	215	5.98
Dre and Bow start to slip on the chores and kids' activities around the house, so Bow persuades Dre to hire a nanny. After several bad interviews, they meet Vivian (Regina Hall), who impresses them with her desire to take care of the whole family including Dre and Bow. Dre struggles with the idea of hiring a black nanny, but decides to give her a try. Meanwhile, Diane decides to run for class president against the smart and bubbly Susie Kwest becomes her competition, so Zoey helps Diane create a smear campaign to win her sister the vote.
43	19	"The Leftovers"	Linda Mendoza	Hale Rothstein	April 6, 2016	220	5.48
Dre and Bow look for a legal guardian for their kids; Junior reveals to Jack some family white lies that he had always naïvely accepted.
44	20	"Johnson & Johnson"	Rob Hardy	Courtney Lilly	April 13, 2016	219	5.67
Dre's sister's upcoming wedding leads to a conversation on tradition, especially after Dre learns that Rainbow never formally took his last name after their marriage. Elsewhere, Jack and Diane are afraid that they are too old to be the ring bearer and flower girl, while Junior and Zoey prep Ruby on how to embrace her daughter's lesbian relationship.
45	21	"The Johnson Show"	Gail Lerner	Corey Nickerson	April 27, 2016	221	4.97
Dre is fearful of losing his job and tarnishing his family's reputation when Stevens & Lido announces company layoffs; Bow wants to show she can do it all on her own when she's put in charge of a school auction.
46	22	"Super Rich Kids"	Anton Cropper	Damilare Sonoiki	May 4, 2016	224	5.59
Junior makes some rich friends, but his father is scared that he will lose his view on the world, and tries to stop him.
47	23	"Daddy Dre-Care"	Kenya Barris	Jonathan Groff	May 11, 2016	223	5.29
All four kids have flu, including Bow and Ruby, and Dre has to take care of all of them. Though it turns out that Bow never had the flu, she is actually pregnant.
48	24	"Good-ish Times"	Anton Cropper	Jenifer Rice-Genzuk Henry	May 18, 2016	222	5.05
Dre imagines what his family would be like in the 1970s.

== Reception ==
=== Ratings ===
Viewership and ratings per episode of Black-ish season 2
No.	Title	Air date	Rating/share (18–49)	Viewers (millions)	DVR (18–49)	DVR viewers (millions)	Total (18–49)	Total viewers (millions)
1	"The Word"	September 23, 2015	2.4/7	7.30	1.4	3.29	3.8	10.59
2	"Rock, Paper, Scissors, Gun"	September 30, 2015	1.8/6	5.94	1.2	2.63	3.0	8.58
3	"Dr. Hell No"	October 7, 2015	1.9/6	5.86	1.1	2.58	3.0	8.44
4	"Daddy's Day"	October 14, 2015	1.8/6	5.66	1.0	—N/a	2.8	—N/a
5	"Churched"	October 21, 2015	1.8/5	5.79	1.0	—N/a	2.8	—N/a
6	"Jacked o' Lantern"	October 28, 2015	1.9	6.18	1.1	2.55	3.0	8.73
7	"Charlie in Charge"	November 11, 2015	1.8/6	5.97	1.2	—N/a	3.0	—N/a
8	"Chop Shop"	November 18, 2015	1.9/6	6.08	1.2	—N/a	3.1	—N/a
9	"Man at Work"	December 2, 2015	1.6/5	5.45	1.1	2.45	2.7	7.89
10	"Stuff"	December 9, 2015	1.7/5	5.97	1.0	2.21	2.7	8.18
11	"Plus Two Isn't a Thing"	January 6, 2016	2.1/6	6.29	1.1	2.59	3.2	8.88
12	"Old Digger"	January 13, 2016	1.9/6	6.06	1.1	2.45	3.0	8.52
13	"Keeping Up With the Johnsons"	January 20, 2016	1.7/5	5.72	1.1	2.54	2.8	8.26
14	"Sink or Swim"	February 10, 2016	1.8/6	6.02	1.1	—N/a	2.9	—N/a
15	"Twindependence"	February 17, 2016	1.8/6	5.74	1.0	2.24	2.8	7.99
16	"Hope"	February 24, 2016	1.9/6	6.18	1.2	2.79	3.1	8.97
17	"Any Given Saturday"	March 16, 2016	1.9/6	6.12	1.0	2.39	2.9	8.51
18	"Black Nanny"	March 23, 2016	1.9/6	5.98	1.0	2.47	2.9	8.47
19	"The Leftovers"	April 6, 2016	1.6/5	5.48	1.0	2.41	2.6	7.87
20	"Johnson & Johnson"	April 13, 2016	1.5/5	5.67	1.0	2.24	2.5	7.91
21	"The Johnson Show"	April 27, 2016	1.5/5	4.97	0.8	2.20	2.3	7.17
22	"Super Rich Kids"	May 4, 2016	1.6/5	5.59	0.8	—N/a	2.4	—N/a
23	"Daddy Dre-Care"	May 11, 2016	1.5/5	5.29	1.0	2.40	2.5	7.69
24	"Good-ish Times"	May 18, 2016	1.5/5	5.05	0.9	2.41	2.4	7.46

=== Accolades ===
Year	Award	Category	Recipient(s)	Result	Ref.
2016	NAACP Image Award	Outstanding Comedy Series	Black-ish	Won	
2016	NAACP Image Award	Outstanding Actor in a Comedy Series	Anthony Anderson	Won	
2016	NAACP Image Award	Outstanding Actress in a Comedy Series	Tracee Ellis Ross	Won	
2016	NAACP Image Award	Outstanding Supporting Actress in a Comedy Series	Marsai Martin	Won	
2016	NAACP Image Award	Outstanding Supporting Actor in a Comedy Series	Miles Brown	Nominated	
2016	NAACP Image Award	Outstanding Supporting Actor in a Comedy Series	Laurence Fishburne	Nominated	
2016	NAACP Image Award	Outstanding Performance by a Youth	Marcus Scribner	Won	
2016	NAACP Image Award	Outstanding Performance by a Youth	Miles Brown	Nominated	
2016	NAACP Image Award	Outstanding Performance by a Youth	Marsai Martin	Nominated	
2016	NAACP Image Award	Outstanding Writing in a Comedy Series	Kenya Barris for "The Word"	Won	
2016	Critics' Choice Television Awards	Best Comedy Series	Black-ish	Nominated	
2016	Critics' Choice Television Awards	Best Actor in a Comedy Series	Anthony Anderson	Nominated	
2016	Critics' Choice Television Awards	Best Actress in a Comedy Series	Tracee Ellis Ross	Nominated	
2016	Critics' Choice Television Awards	Best Guest Performer in a Comedy Series	Jenifer Lewis	Nominated	
2016	Peabody Award		Black-ish	Won	
2016	Nickelodeon Kids Choice Awards	Favorite TV Actor - Family Show	Anthony Anderson	Nominated	
2016	TCA Awards	Outstanding Achievement in Comedy	Black-ish	Won	
2016	Primetime Emmy Award	Outstanding Comedy Series	Black-ish	Nominated	
2016	Primetime Emmy Award	Outstanding Lead Actor in a Comedy Series	Anthony Anderson	Nominated	
2016	Primetime Emmy Award	Outstanding Lead Actress in a Comedy Series	Tracee Ellis Ross	Nominated	
