= BET YoungStars Award =

American Black media award

The BET YoungStars Award honors young African-American people who have made an impact in the world of television, film, music, or sports. It has been presented at the annual BET Awards since 2010.

Marsai Martin has won the award five times. The youngest winner is Willow Smith (10) and the youngest nominee is Van Van (5).

== Winners and nominees ==
Winners are listed first and highlighted in bold. Age listed is at the date of the awards show.

=== 2010s ===
Year	Star	Occupation	Age	Ref
2010
2010	**Keke Palmer**	Actress	16	
2010	Selena Gomez	Actress	17	
2010	Lil' JJ	Actor	19	
2010	Willow Smith	Singer	9	
2010	Tyler James Williams	Actor	17	
2011
2011	**Jaden Smith**	Actor	12	
2011	**Willow Smith**	Singer	10	
2011	Shenell Edmonds	Actress	17	
2011	Keke Palmer	Actress	17	
2011	Diggy Simmons	Rapper	16	
2012
2012	**Diggy Simmons**	Rapper	17	
2012	Astro	Rapper	15	
2012	Jacob Latimore	Singer	15	
2012	Keke Palmer	Actress	18	
2012	Willow Smith	Singer	11	
2013
2013	**Gabrielle Douglas**	Athlete	17	
2013	Jacob Latimore	Singer	16	
2013	Keke Palmer	Actress	19	
2013	Jaden Smith	Actor	14	
2013	Quvenzhané Wallis	Actress	9	
2014
2014	**Keke Palmer**	Actress	20	
2014	Gabrielle Douglas	Athlete	18	
2014	Jacob Latimore	Singer	17	
2014	Jaden Smith	Actor	15	
2014	Zendaya	Actress	17	
2015
2015	**Mo'ne Davis**	Athlete	14	
2015	Jacob Latimore	Singer	18	
2015	Jaden Smith	Actor	16	
2015	Quvenzhané Wallis	Actress	11	
2015	Zendaya	Actress	18	
2016
2016	**Amandla Stenberg**	Actress	17	
2016	Quvenzhané Wallis	Actress	12	
2016	Silentó	Singer	18	
2016	Willow Smith	Singer	15	
2016	Yara Shahidi	Actress	16	
2017
2017	**Yara Shahidi**	Actress	17	
2017	Ace Hunter	Actor	10	
2017	Caleb McLaughlin	Actor	15	
2017	Jaden Smith	Actor	18	
2017	Marsai Martin	Actress	12	
2018
2018	**Yara Shahidi**	Actress	18	
2018	Caleb McLaughlin	Actor	16	
2018	Lonnie Chavis	Actor	7	
2018	Miles Brown	Actor	13	
2018	Ashton Tyler	Actor	12	
2019
2019	**Marsai Martin**	Actress	14	
2019	Caleb McLaughlin	Actor	17	
2019	Lyric Ross	Actress	15	
2019	Michael Rainey Jr.	Actor	18	
2019	Miles Brown	Actor	14	

=== 2020s ===
Year	Star	Occupation	Age	Ref
2020
2020	**Marsai Martin**	Actress	15	
2020	Alex Hibbert	Actor	15	
2020	Asante Blackk	Actor	18	
2020	Jahi Di'Allo Winston	Actor	16	
2020	Miles Brown	Actor	15	
2020	Storm Reid	Actress	16	
2021
2021	**Marsai Martin**	Actress	16	
2021	Alex R. Hibbert	Actor	16	
2021	Ethan Hutchison	Actor	10	
2021	Lonnie Chavis	Actor	13	
2021	Michael Epps	Actor	15	
2021	Storm Reid	Actress	17	
2022
2022	**Marsai Martin**	Actress	17	
2022	Akira Akbar	Actress	15	
2022	Demi Singleton	Actress	15	
2022	Miles Brown	Actor	17	
2022	Saniyya Sidney	Actress	15	
2022	Storm Reid	Actress	18	
2023
2023	**Marsai Martin**	Actress	18	
2023	Akira Akbar	Actress	16	
2023	Alaya High	Actress	16	
2023	Demi Singleton	Actress	16	
2023	Genesis Denise	Actress	18	
2023	Thaddeus J. Mixson	Actor	15	
2023	Young Dylan	Actor	14	
2024
2024	**Blue Ivy Carter**	Singer	12	
2024	Akira Akbar	Actress	17	
2024	Demi Singleton	Actress	17	
2024	Heiress Diana Harris	Singer	8	
2024	Jabria McCullum	Actress	8	
2024	Jalyn Hall	Actor	17	
2024	Leah Jeffries	Actress	14	
2024	Van Van	Rapper	5	

== Multiple wins and nominations ==
=== Multiple wins ===
2 wins

- Yara Shahidi
- Keke Palmer
- Blue Ivy Carter

5 wins

- Marsai Martin

=== Multiple nominations ===
2 nominations

- Diggy Simmons
- Blue Ivy Carter
- Gabrielle Douglas
- Zendaya

3 nominations

- Akira Akbar
- Caleb McLaughlin
- Storm Reid
- Yara Shahidi
- Demi Singleton
- Quvenzhané Wallis

4 nominations

- Miles Brown
- Willow Smith
- Jacob Latimore

5 nominations

- Keke Palmer
- Jaden Smith

6 nominations

- Marsai Martin
