= Loving You Is Killing Me =

Single by Aloe Blacc

from the album Good Things
- Released: March 7, 2011
- Recorded: 2010
- Genre: R&B, soul
- Length: 3:24
- Label: Stones Throw
- Songwriters: Jeffrey Scott Silverman, Leon Marcus Michels, Nicholas Anthony Movshon, E. Nathaniel Dawkins
- Producers: Leon Michels, Jeff Dynamite

Aloe Blacc singles chronology
"I Need a Dollar" (2010)	"Loving You Is Killing Me" (2011)	"Green Lights" (2011)

"Loving You Is Killing Me" is a song by American singer Aloe Blacc, with music and lyrics by Jeffrey Scott Silverman, Leon Marcus Michels, Nicholas Anthony Movshon and E. Nathaniel Dawkins and produced by Leon Michels and Jeff Dynamite.

== Music video ==
The music video for the song was uploaded to YouTube on March 15, 2011. It features actor Miles Brown.

== Credits and personnel ==
- Lead vocals – Aloe Blacc
- Producers – Leon Michels, Jeff Dynamite
- Lyrics – Jeffrey Scott Silverman, Leon Marcus Michels, Nicholas Anthony Movshon, E. Nathaniel Dawkins
- Label: Stones Throw Records

== Live performances ==
Aloe Blacc performed the song on Later... with Jools Holland in 2010.

== Track listings ==
Promo CD single No. 1

1. "Loving You Is Killing Me" – 3:24

Promo CD single No. 2

1. "Loving You Is Killing Me" (Bonnie & Clyde Radio Mix Edit) – 3:13
2. "Loving You Is Killing Me" (Bonnie & Clyde Radio Mix Edit Instrumental) – 3:14

Digital download

1. "Loving You Is Killing Me" (Numarek Single Mix) – 3:17
2. "Loving You Is Killing Me" – 3:25
3. "Loving You Is Killing Me" (Mano Le Tough Remix) – 7:29
4. "Loving You Is Killing Me" (Music video) – 3:12

== Chart performance ==
=== Weekly charts ===
Chart (2011)	Peak position
Austria (Ö3 Austria Top 40)	8
Belgium (Ultratip Bubbling Under Flanders)	12
Germany (GfK)	12
Switzerland (Schweizer Hitparade)	26

=== Year-end charts ===
Chart (2011)	Position
German Singles Chart	79
Austrian Singles Chart	65

== Certifications ==
Region	Certification	Certified units/sales
Austria (IFPI Austria)	Gold	15,000^{*}
Germany (BVMI)	Gold	150,000^{^}
^{*} Sales figures based on certification alone.^{^} Shipments figures based on certification alone.

== Release history ==
Country	Date	Format	Label
Austria	4 March 2011	Digital download	Stones Throw Records
