= Carnival Cravings =

- Also known as: Carnival Cravings with Anthony Anderson
- Genre: Cooking
- Written by: Sara Scala
- Presented by: Anthony Anderson
- Country of origin: United States
- Original language: English
- No. of seasons: 2

Production
- Executive producers: Patrick Beedle; John Kitchener; Anthony Anderson; Anna Campbell; Brian Robel
- Producer: Robin Humbert
- Cinematography: Ian Ievasseur
- Editor: Philip Perrault
- Running time: 30 minutes
- Production company: Magnetic Productions

Original release
- Network: Food Network
- Release: August 12, 2015 – present

Related
- Carnival Eats

Carnival Cravings (also known as Carnival Cravings with Anthony Anderson) is an American television series on Food Network about unique food found at American carnivals. The series features actor/host Anthony Anderson as he samples culinary creations only available at carnivals, fairs and festivals around the country. The show premiered on August 12, 2015, and airs on Wednesdays at 10:00 p.m. EDT.

== Premise ==
Opening Introduction: (narrated by Anthony Anderson)

I'm on the hunt for the craziest carnival food I can find. I'm taking about all things bacon-wrapped, deep-fried, sugar-dusted, dipped in chocolate, smothered with cheese...sometimes all at once. And I might just have a little carnival fun while I'm at it. So throw your diets out the window, people, because this is Carnival Cravings.

== Episodes ==
No.	Title	Original release date
1	"Sweet Carolina Cravings"	August 12, 2015
Anthony Anderson visits the Got To Be NC Festival in Raleigh, North Carolina to try "Redneck Eggs Rolls", stuffed with pulled pork and collard greens at the Backyard Bistro, "United Nations", chipotle chicken sausage and chimichurri inside a baguette at Baguetteaboutit, "Gator MacAttack", ribbon fries topped with macaroni & cheese and alligator chili at Chester's Gators & Taters, Fried chicken gizzards and okra at Angela's Seafood Hut, "Froggenstein", "sweet swamp" batter fried fog legs with "ribbit sauce" (pickle juice) and Lemonade Cotton Candy at the Great Carolina Food Bizarre tent, "Pig Wings" at Granny's Country Kitchen, and the "Belt Buster", caramel cookie bar stuffed in a bacon-wrapped deep-fried Twinkie on a stick at Tropical Island Concessions. Also, he tries out ax throwing in the Lumberjack competition and bets the farm at the pig races.
2	"Ooey-Gooey Golden State"	August 19, 2015
Anthony travels to Sacramento, California for the Sacramento County Fair, where he samples "Squeeze w/ Cheese", a burger with the legendary "cheese skirt" from the Squeeze Inn; "Dirty Fries", topped with three cheeses, pulled pork, pastrami and chili at Grinders; "Greek Nachos", a deconstructed gyro with deep-fried pita bread, at The Sleek Greek; a cereal-coated chicken sandwich with sriracha mayo at Munch-A-Bunch; a deep-fired peanut butter & jelly cheesecake with bubblegum ball frosting at Sweet Cheeks; "Cinnamon Roll Sundae" topped with ice cream, whipped cream, walnuts and bacon at Country Fair Cinnamon Rolls; world's largest waffle cone with 1/2 gallon of gelato at Colossal Gelato; jalapeno & cheese pretzel with cream cheese/Red Hots dip. Also, he goes inside a Zoom ball, watches a rodeo and drives in the demolition derby.
3	"Deep-Fried Rockies"	August 26, 2015
Anthony visits Parker Days Festival in Parker, Colorado to try "Brisket & Waffle", beef brisket on a sweet potato waffle at Sweet Lorraine's; "Dino Rib", massive oak-smoked beef ribs glazed with hoisin sauce at Parker Garage; "The Carnivore", 3 sandwiches in 1: an "All-American Burger" topped with a "cowboy bacon buffalo burger" and BBQ brisket at Colorado Buffalo Grill; rabbit tamales with prickly pear chili at Rory's Rollin' Diner; a "Fried TV Dinner", mash potatoes, corn, cheddar cheese and ranch dressing wrapped into a chicken breast at Lazy H Grill and also tries their bacon-wrapped sriracha onion rings with habanero pineapple salsa; and a deep-fried root beer float with fried root beer balls and fried ice cream at Blue Sky Concessions. Later, he checks out the Strongman Competition and gets into a sumo wrestling battle.
4	"Bacon-Wrapped Heartland"	September 2, 2015
Anthony visits Prairie Fest in Oswego, Illinois to try a "Xango", deep-fried cheesecake rolled in a cinnamon/sugar tortilla with caramel/raspberry sauce & whipped cream at Red Chili Pepper Mexican Cafe; Grecian-style Grilled Kefalotyri Cheese on pita bread at Greek Delights; Bacon-Wrapped Roasted Corn; "Apple Pie Fries" at Marian's Sweets; Italian Beef Sandwich, root beer braised skirt steak, Gouda cheese and sarsaparilla au jus at Tap House Grill; Sweet Potato Poutine with fried cheese curds at Real Wisconsin Cheese; "Pop Cone", popcorn ball topped with chocolate in a cone at Page's Popcorn & Treats; and a Chicago Crab Dog, topped with corn salsa, coleslaw, dill pickle, chipotle mayo, peppers and celery salt at Cape May Crab Cake Factory. Later, he plays "bubble soccer" and runs into his aunt searching for her own carnival cravings.
5	"San Diego on a Stick"	September 9, 2015
Anthony visits the San Diego County Fair in San Diego, California to sample "Chile Relleno Pretzel Cheeseburger", beef/chorizo patties, fried chile relleno, avocado, chipotle mayo, pretzel bun at Grant's Tasti Burgers; "Betty White Naked Dog" with pastrami, chili, cheese, onions at Pink's Hot Dogs; "Deep-Fried Philly Cheesesteak Chimichanga" at Austiano's Grill; Thai Chicken Indian Fry Bread with cabbage & sweet chili sauce at B&J Concessions; "Spaghetti & Meatball Sandwich" at Pignotti's Gourmet Italian Food; "Seven Layer S'more Sundae" with chocolate chip cookie dough, graham crackers, marshmallow cream, Hershey bars, ice cream at Gingerbread Shop; $125 "Deep-Fried Caviar Twinkie" at Chicken Charlie's, a "Beef Sundae", layers of brisket, baked beans, slaw, potatoes at Chuckwagon. Later, he judges a kid's bubble gum-blowing contest.
6	"Lobster Dogs and So-Cal Sundaes"	September 16, 2015
Anthony visits the Alameda County Fair in Pleasanton, California to taste Crawfish Étouffée at Southern Comfort Kitchen; "Mac & Cheese Stuffed Bacon Burger" & "Peanut Butter & Jelly Fries" at Stuffie's Char-Broiler, "Double-Stuffed Garlic Sausage" at Garlicky's; "Meats in Paradise", deep-fried corn-dog battered bacon-wrapped pork belly at Light Bulb Grill; "Lobster Corn Dog" w/ lemon aioli at Sharky's Fish Fry; "Spaghetti Ice Cream", spaghetti-shaped vanilla topped with strawberry "marinara" sauce, white chocolate "Parmesan", chocolate-covered "meatball" brownies at Cardinali Family Ice Cream; "Red Velvet Funnel Cake" with cream cheese icing at Iron Skillet Funnel Cakes; and "Red, White & Blue Potato", with Greek yogurt sriracha chicken, blue cheese crumbles & truffle Alfredo at Spud Ranch. Later, he partakes in a "Yoke-on-You" contest.
