= Green Lights =

Single by Aloe Blacc

from the album Good Things
- Released: September 9, 2011
- Recorded: 2000–11
- Genre: R&B, soul
- Length: 2:56
- Label: Stones Throw
- Songwriters: Jeffrey Scott Silverman, Leon Marcus Michels, Nicholas Anthony Movshon, E. Nathaniel Dawkins
- Producers: Leon Michels, Jeff Dynamite

Aloe Blacc singles chronology
"Loving You Is Killing Me" (2011)	"Green Lights" (2011)	"Wake Me Up!" (2013)

"Green Lights" is a song by American artist Aloe Blacc, with music and lyrics by Jeffrey Scott Silverman, Leon Marcus Michels, Nicholas Anthony Movshon, E. Nathaniel Dawkins and produced by Leon Michels and Jeff Dynamite. It was released on 9 September 2011 as a Digital download in the United Kingdom. It has peaked to number 130 on the UK Singles Chart.

== Music video ==
A music video to accompany the release of "Green Lights" was first released onto YouTube on 12 August 2011 at a total length of three minutes and twelve seconds.

== Credits and personnel ==
- Lead vocals – Aloe Blacc
- Producers – Leon Michels, Jeff Dynamite
- Lyrics – Jeffrey Scott Silverman, Leon Marcus Michels, Nicholas Anthony Movshon, E. Nathaniel Dawkins
- Label: Stones Throw Records

== Track listings ==
Promo CD single

1. "Green Lights" – 2:54

Digital download

1. "Green Lights" – 2:56
2. "Green Lights" (Future Fitz Radio Mix) – 3:11
3. "Green Lights" (Grand Scheme Mix) – 2:55
4. "Green Lights" (Jack Beats Remix) – 4:11
5. "Green Lights" (Wideboys Remix) – 6:37

== Chart performance ==
Chart (2011)	Peak position
Austria (Ö3 Austria Top 40)	69
UK Singles (The Official Charts Company)	130

== Release history ==
Country	Date	Format	Label
United Kingdom, United States	9 September 2011	Digital download	Stones Throw Records
