= I Need a Dollar =

2010 single by Aloe Blacc

Single by Aloe Blacc

from the album Good Things
- Released: March 16, 2010
- Recorded: 2010
- Genre: Soul
- Length: 4:04
- Label: Stones Throw; Sony Music UK
- Songwriters: Leon Michels; E. Nathaniel Dawkins; Nick Movshon; Jeff Dynamite
- Producers: Leon Michels; Jeff Dynamite

Aloe Blacc singles chronology
"Get Down" (2006)	"I Need a Dollar" (2010)	"Loving You Is Killing Me" (2011)

Music video
- "I Need A Dollar" on YouTube "I Need A Dollar" Alternative version on YouTube

"I Need a Dollar" is a song performed by American singer Aloe Blacc, written by Blacc, Leon Michels, Nick Movshon and Jeff Dynamite.

It is the intro song for the HBO show How to Make It in America, and was featured as the iTunes Single of the Week. It also featured in the game Fight Night Champion (2011). Blacc has performed the song live on Later... with Jools Holland, The Graham Norton Show, Late Night with Jimmy Fallon, and Conan. In April 2011, it was featured in a commercial for Boost Mobile wireless services.

== Music video ==
The standard version of the song has two music videos. The first, released in 2010, was filmed in New York, and features the screen being split in half. The right side shows Blacc singing inside an apartment while the left side shows a man walking through the streets of New York. Once Aloe enters the left side after the line "Maybe it's inside the bottle" and performs at a bar, the song changes to "Life So Hard".

The second, released in 2011, was filmed in and around Las Vegas and was directed by Derek Pike. The video shows Blacc walking alone along a highway in Nevada, and then hitching a ride to Las Vegas, where he finds a dollar coin on the casino floor, uses it to play a slot machine, and wins.

== Formats and track listings ==
UK digital single

1. "I Need a Dollar" – 4:05
2. "I Need a Dollar" (Radio Mix) – 3:22
3. "I Need a Dollar" (Zinc Remix) – 5:48
4. "I Need a Dollar" (Blue Fear Trance Remix) – 10:49

German digital single

1. "I Need a Dollar" – 4:02
2. "I Need a Dollar" (Tensnake Remix) – 6:45
3. "I Need a Dollar" (M.Arfmann & Chassy Wezar RMX) – 3:27

== Charts ==
=== Weekly charts ===
Chart	Peak position
Australia (ARIA)	11
Austria (Ö3 Austria Top 40)	5
Belgium (Ultratop 50 Flanders)	1
Belgium (Ultratop 50 Wallonia)	4
Czech Republic Airplay (ČNS IFPI)	8
Denmark (Tracklisten)	35
Europe (Hot 100)	16
France (SNEP)	52
Germany (GfK)	4
Hungary (Rádiós Top 40)	18
Ireland (IRMA)	2
Israel International Airplay (Media Forest)	1
Italy (FIMI)	16
New Zealand (Recorded Music NZ)	20
Netherlands (Single Top 100)	53
Scottish Singles Sales (Official Charts)	2
Switzerland (Schweizer Hitparade)	5
UK Singles (Official Charts)	2
UK Hip Hop/R&B (Official Charts)	1

=== Year-end charts ===
Chart (2010)	Position
Austrian Singles Chart	57
Belgian Singles Chart (Flanders)	18
Belgian Singles Chart (Wallonia)	55
French Singles Chart	86
Germany Singles Chart	86
Swiss Singles Chart	55
Chart (2011)	Position
Australian Singles Chart	64
Irish Singles Chart	20
Italy (Musica e dischi)	68
Swiss Singles Chart	61
UK Singles Chart	18

== Certifications ==
Region	Certification	Certified units/sales
Australia (ARIA)	2× Platinum	140,000^{^}
Austria (IFPI Austria)	Gold	15,000^{*}
Belgium (BRMA)	Gold	15,000^{*}
Canada (Music Canada)	Gold	40,000^{‡}
Denmark (IFPI Danmark)	Platinum	90,000^{‡}
Germany (BVMI)	3× Gold	450,000^{‡}
Italy (FIMI)	Platinum	50,000^{‡}
New Zealand (RMNZ)	Gold	7,500^{*}
Switzerland (IFPI Switzerland)	Platinum	30,000^{^}
United Kingdom (BPI)	Platinum	695,210
Streaming
Denmark (IFPI Danmark)	Gold	900,000^{†}
^{*} Sales figures based on certification alone.^{^} Shipments figures based on certification alone.^{‡} Sales+streaming figures based on certification alone.^{†} Streaming-only figures based on certification alone.

== Samples and covers ==
Various hip-hop artists have sampled "I Need a Dollar" or freestyled over the instrumental, including Yelawolf, T.I., Wax, Dumbfoundead, Chris Webby, MGK, and Mac Miller, and Sammy Adams.

Australian artist Xavier Rudd covered "I Need a Dollar" on 'Like a Version', a segment on the Australian radio station 'Triple J'

British artists Ed Solo and Deekline together remixed "I Need A Dollar" and released it as a single with the same name.
