= Shine Through =

Studio album by Aloe Blacc
- Released: July 11, 2006
- Recorded: 2002 ("Long Time Coming"); 2003-2006
- Genre: Hip-hop; soul; R&B; reggae
- Length: 60:25
- Label: Stones Throw
- Producer: Aloe Blacc, Madlib, Oh No

Aloe Blacc chronology
The Aloe Blacc EP 2: Me and My Music (2004)	Shine Through (2006)	Good Things (2010)

Professional ratings
Review scores
Source	Rating
AllMusic	3.5/5 stars
Pitchfork Media	7.7/10

Shine Through is the debut album by American musician Aloe Blacc. The album, released on Stones Throw, is mostly produced by Aloe himself, but also features production from Oh No and Madlib. The instrumental version of the album was released on vinyl and made available for MP3 download purchase on the Stones Throw website.

== Track listing ==
#	Title	Composer(s)	Performer(s)	Producer(s)	Length
1	"Whole World"	E. Dawkins III	Aloe Blacc	Aloe Blacc	3:57
2	"Long Time Coming"	S. Cooke	Aloe Blacc	Oh No	4:13
3	"Are You Ready"	E. Dawkins III	Aloe Blacc	Aloe Blacc	3:21
4	"Busking"	E. Dawkins III	Aloe Blacc	Aloe Blacc	2:17
5	"Bailar - Scene I"	E. Dawkins III; F. Nascimento; M. Bergen	Aloe Blacc	Aloe Blacc; J. Rawls; Fabiano Nascimento (guitar); Michael Bergen (keyboards)	4:14
6	"Nascimento (Birth) - Scene II"	E. Dawkins III; F. Nascimento	Aloe Blacc	Aloe Blacc; Fabiano Nascimento (guitar)	4:31
7	"Dance for Life"	E. Dawkins III; H. Greif	Aloe Blacc	Aloe Blacc; Henry Greif (bass)	3:41
8	"Patria Mia"	E. Dawkins III	Aloe Blacc	Aloe Blacc	4:28
9	"Shine Through"	E. Dawkins III; B. Goldhorn	Aloe Blacc	Aloe Blacc; Brad Goldhorn (guitar)	1:04
10	"Caged Birdsong"	E. Dawkins III; D. Rozelle	Aloe Blacc; Danica Rozelle	Aloe Blacc	3:47
11	"Arrive"	E. Dawkins III	Aloe Blacc	Aloe Blacc	3:11
12	"Want Me"	E. Dawkins III	Aloe Blacc	Aloe Blacc	3:31
13	"One Inna"	E. Dawkins III; O. Jackson Jr.	Aloe Blacc	Madlib	3:48
14	"I'm Beautiful"	E. Dawkins III	Aloe Blacc	Aloe Blacc	3:50
15	"Gente Ordinária" (CD-only bonus track)	E. Dawkins III	Aloe Blacc	Aloe Blacc	5:22
16	"Severa" (CD-only bonus track)	E. Dawkins III	Aloe Blacc	Aloe Blacc	5:10

== Personnel ==
Contributors
Producers
Producer(s)	Aloe Blacc, Oh No, Madlib
Executive producer(s)	Peanut Butter Wolf
Performers
Lead vocals and rapping	Aloe Blacc
Additional and background vocals	Danica Rozelle
Instruments	Aloe Blacc (bass guitar, percussion, horns), Fabiano Nascimento (guitar), Michael Bergen (keyboards), Henry Greif (bass), Brad Goldhorn (guitar)
Technicians
Mixing	Aloe Blacc
Engineering	Aloe Blacc
Mastering	Kelly Hibbert
Photography	B+
Design	Ben Loiz
