= Miles Brown (actor) =

American actor (born 2004)

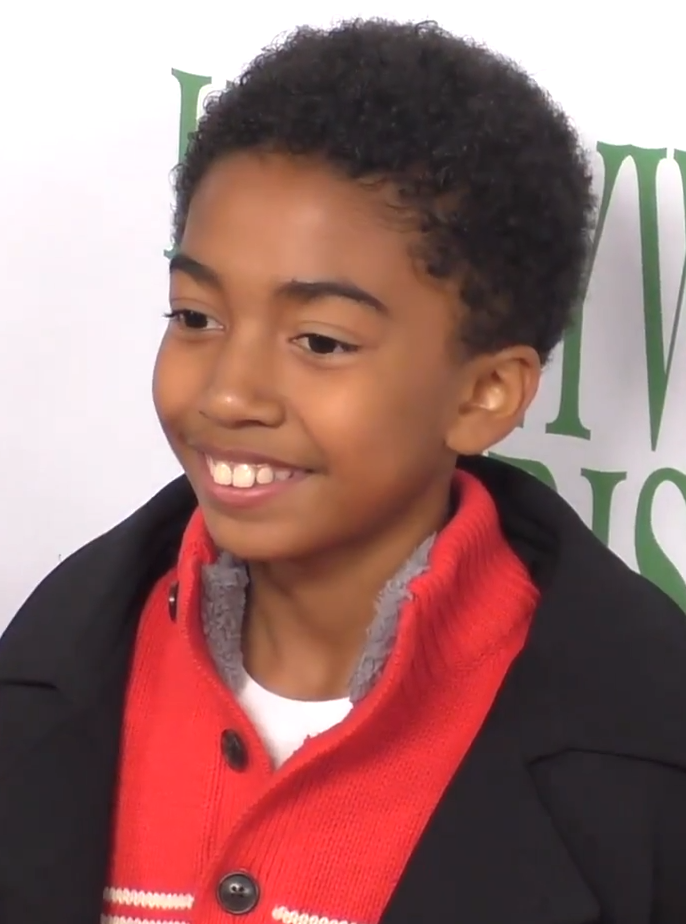
- Brown in 2016
- Born: December 28, 2004 (age 21); Oxnard, California, U.S.
- Occupations: Actor; dancer; rapper
- Years active: 2010–present
- Parent(s): Jack "Wildchild" Brown; Cyndee Brown

Miles Brown (born December 28, 2004), also known by his stage name Baby Boogaloo, is an American actor, dancer, and rapper. He is best known for his role as Jack Johnson in the ABC comedy series Black-ish.

== Life and career ==
Brown was born on December 28, 2004, in Oxnard, California. He is the son of rapper Wildchild (Jack Brown) and Cyndee Brown. He has an older sister. Brown's father is African-American, while his mother is of Filipino and Mexican descent.

As a young child, he danced in music videos—including "Yeah 3x" and "Loving You Is Killing Me"—and on the children's show Yo Gabba Gabba!. At the age of 5, he was a guest on The Ellen DeGeneres Show and a contestant on the fifth season of America's Got Talent as part of the dance duo Future Funk. His first role in a feature film was as part of the Little Rascals Intro Battle Crew in the dance-drama movie Battlefield America. Brown was also in a dance group called Alias Dance Company from 2010 to 2014.

In 2014, Brown was cast opposite Anthony Anderson and Tracee Ellis Ross in the ABC comedy series Black-ish created by Kenya Barris. For his role as Jack Johnson on the show, he has been nominated for four NAACP Image Awards, two Screen Actors Guild Awards, and the BET YoungStars Award. He won a Young Artist Award for Best Performance in a TV Series - Supporting Young Actor.

Between 2014 and 2016, Brown appeared in several short films. He and Marsai Martin, who plays his twin sister on Black-ish, voice the recurring characters of siblings Jack and Jill on Goldie & Bear. Brown danced in Cirque du Soleil's annual benefit show, One Night for One Drop.

In 2018, Brown was cast in the main role of the indie film Boy Genius alongside Rita Wilson. Later that year, he released his first single, "NBA," and competed on the first season of Dancing with the Stars: Juniors. He was named one of Hollywood's top 30 stars under 18 by The Hollywood Reporter. In October 2020, Brown released his debut album We the Future, with production from Madlib, Mic Checkmate and Deliv; as well as features from Jidenna, Slick Rick, Siedah Garrett, Dame D.O.L.L.A. and his father Wildchild.

Brown is the youngest member of the Jr. NBA Leadership Council.

== Filmography ==
=== Film ===
Year	Title	Role	Notes
2012	Battlefield America	Little Rascals Intro Battle Crew	
2015	Two Bellmen	Ice Cream Kid	Short film
2015	Queens & Kings Shopping Cart Race	Mini Basketball Bomber	Short film
2016	How to Catch a Ghost	Andrew	Short film
2019	Boy Genius	Emmett	
2021	Free Guy	Baby	

=== Music Videos ===
Year	Title	Artist	Notes
2011	Loving You Is Killing Me	Aloe Blacc	
2015	Queens & Kings	MALAKAI	

=== Television ===
Year	Title	Role	Notes
2010	America's Got Talent	Contestant	Eliminated in the semifinals.
2012	Raising Hope	Trick-or-Treater	Episode: "Don't Ask, Don't Tell Me What to Do"
2013	Shameless	Ashish	Episode: "The Helpful Gallaghers"
2014–2022	Black-ish	Jack Johnson	Series regular
2015	The Thundermans	Little Boy	Episode: "Mall Time Crooks"
2015–2018	Drunk History	Theodore Livingston / Louis Armstrong	2 episodes
2015–2016	Goldie & Bear	Jack (voice)	3 Episodes
2017	Rad Lands	Fresh Song New Kid	Episode: "Logan"
2018	Dancing with the Stars: Juniors	Contestant	Runner-up
2019	Mixed-ish	Jack Johnson	Episode: "Becoming Bow"
2020	Ridiculousness	Himself	Episode: "Miles Brown"
2020	Wild 'n Out	Himself	Episode: Miles Brown/Marsai Martin/Saint Jhn/EPMD
2020	The Not-Too-Late Show with Elmo	Himself	Episode: "Miles Brown / Joyous String Quartet"
2020	Group Chat	Himself	Episode: "Group Chat Unleashed - Party Pooper Prank"
2021	Arcane	Young Ekko	3 Episodes
2021	Nickelodeon's Unfiltered	Himself	Episode: "Kickin' Carrots & Bubbly Tea!"
2021	Grown-ish	Jack Johnson	3 episodes
2023	Monster High	Gillington Webber	Episode: "Monster Movie"

== Discography ==
- We the Future (2020)

== Awards and nominations ==
Year	Association	Category	Nominated work	Result
2015	Young Artist Award	Best Performance in a TV Series - Supporting Young Actor	Black-ish	Nominated
2016	Young Artist Award	Best Performance in a TV Series - Supporting Young Actor	Black-ish	Won
2016	Young Artist Award	Outstanding Young Ensemble Cast in a Television Series	Black-ish	Nominated
2016	NAACP Image Award	Outstanding Performance by a Youth (Series, Special, Television Movie or Limited Series)	Black-ish	Nominated
2016	NAACP Image Award	Outstanding Supporting Actor in a Comedy Series	Black-ish	Nominated
2017	NAACP Image Award	Outstanding Performance by a Youth (Series, Special, Television Movie or Limited Series)	Black-ish	Nominated
2017	NAACP Image Award	Outstanding Supporting Actor in a Comedy Series	Black-ish	Nominated
2017	Screen Actors Guild Awards	Outstanding Performance by an Ensemble in a Comedy Series	Black-ish	Nominated
2018	Screen Actors Guild Awards	Outstanding Performance by an Ensemble in a Comedy Series	Black-ish	Nominated
2018	BET Awards	YoungStars Award	Black-ish	Nominated
2019	BET Awards	YoungStars Award	Black-ish	Nominated
2019	NAACP Image Award	Outstanding Performance by a Youth (Series, Special, Television Movie or Limited Series)	Black-ish	Nominated
