= Roseaux (band) =

French musical project

- Origin: France
- Years active: 2012–present
- Labels: Fanon / Tôt ou Tard
- Members: Emile Omar; Alex Finkin; Clement Petit

Roseaux (French pronunciation: [ʁozo]) is a French musical project created by Emile Omar in 2012 that also includes Alex Finkin and Clement Petit. The band released its self-titled debut album in 2012, through Fanon / Tôt ou Tard. All eleven tracks feature the vocals of Aloe Blacc. The record charted on SNEP, the official French singles and albums chart.

In September 2019, they issued their second album, Roseaux II.

== Discography ==
=== Albums ===
Year	Album	Peak positions
Year	Album	FR
2012	Roseaux	92
2019	Roseaux II	–
2025	Roseaux III	–

=== Singles ===
Year	Single	Peak positions	Album
Year	Single	FR	Album
2012	"More Than Material" (Roseaux feat. Aloe Blacc)	80	Roseaux
2019	"I Am Going Home" (Roseaux feat. Ben l'Oncle Soul)	–	Roseaux II
2023	"Loving You is All I Want to Do" (Roseaux feat. Aloe Blacc)	–	–
