= Good Things (Aloe Blacc album) =

Studio album by Aloe Blacc
- Released: September 28, 2010
- Recorded: 2009–2010
- Genre: Soul
- Length: 47:33
- Label: Stones Throw, Vertigo
- Producer: Truth & Soul

Aloe Blacc chronology
Shine Through (2006)	Good Things (2010)	Energy Live Session: Aloe Blacc & the Grand Scheme (2013)

Singles from Aloe Blacc
- 1. "I Need a Dollar" Released: 16 March 2010; 2. "Loving You Is Killing Me" Released: 7 March 2011; 3. "Green Lights" Released: 9 September 2011

Professional ratings
Aggregate scores
Source	Rating
AnyDecentMusic?	7.4/10
Metacritic	82/100
Review scores
Source	Rating
AllMusic	4/5 stars
The A.V. Club	A−
The Guardian	4/5 stars
The Independent	4/5 stars
Mojo	4/5 stars
NME	8/10
Pitchfork	6.7/10
Q	4/5 stars
Spin	8/10
URB	4/5 stars

Good Things is the second studio album by American musician Aloe Blacc. The album was released on September 28, 2010, in the US and 26 November 2010 in the UK by Stones Throw Records.

== Singles ==
The first single from the album, "I Need a Dollar" (produced by Truth & Soul), was released on March 16, 2010. It peaked No. 2 in the UK and Ireland. In Switzerland and Austria it peaked at No. 5, No. 1 in Belgium (Flanders). An edited version of the song serves as the theme song for the HBO series How to Make It in America.

The second single, "Loving You Is Killing Me", was released on March 7, 2011. It peaked No. 8 in Austria, No. 12 in Austria and Belgium (Flanders) and No. 26 in Switzerland.

"Green Lights" was released as the second single in UK (third overall) on September 9, 2011.

== Track listing ==
No.	Title	Length
1.	"I Need a Dollar"	4:06
2.	"Green Lights"	2:58
3.	"Hey Brother"	2:40
4.	"Miss Fortune"	4:22
5.	"Life So Hard"	4:13
6.	"Take Me Back"	3:47
7.	"Femme Fatale" (The Velvet Underground cover)	3:56
8.	"Loving You Is Killing Me"	3:27
9.	"Good Things"	4:04
10.	"You Make Me Smile"	3:27
11.	"If I"	4:08
12.	"Mama Hold My Hand"	5:10
13.	"Politician (Reprise)"	1:39

== Charts ==
=== Weekly charts ===
Chart (2010–11)	Peak position
Australian Albums (ARIA)	22
Austrian Albums (Ö3 Austria)	36
Belgian Albums (Ultratop Flanders)	5
Belgian Alternative Albums (Ultratop Flanders)	2
Belgian Albums (Ultratop Wallonia)	30
Dutch Albums (Album Top 100)	39
Dutch Alternative Albums (MegaCharts)	2
French Albums (SNEP)	19
German Albums (Offizielle Top 100)	29
Irish Albums (IRMA)	21
New Zealand Albums (RMNZ)	21
Scottish Albums (OCC)	9
Swiss Albums (Schweizer Hitparade)	31
UK Albums (OCC)	8
UK R&B Albums (OCC)	10
US Heatseekers Albums (Billboard)	10
US Top R&B/Hip-Hop Albums (Billboard)	41

=== Year-end charts ===
Chart (2010)	Rank
French Albums (SNEP)	112
Chart (2011)	Rank
Australian Urban Albums (ARIA)	26
UK Albums (OCC)	84
UK R&B Albums (OCC)	14
