= Anthony Anderson =

American actor and comedian (born 1970)

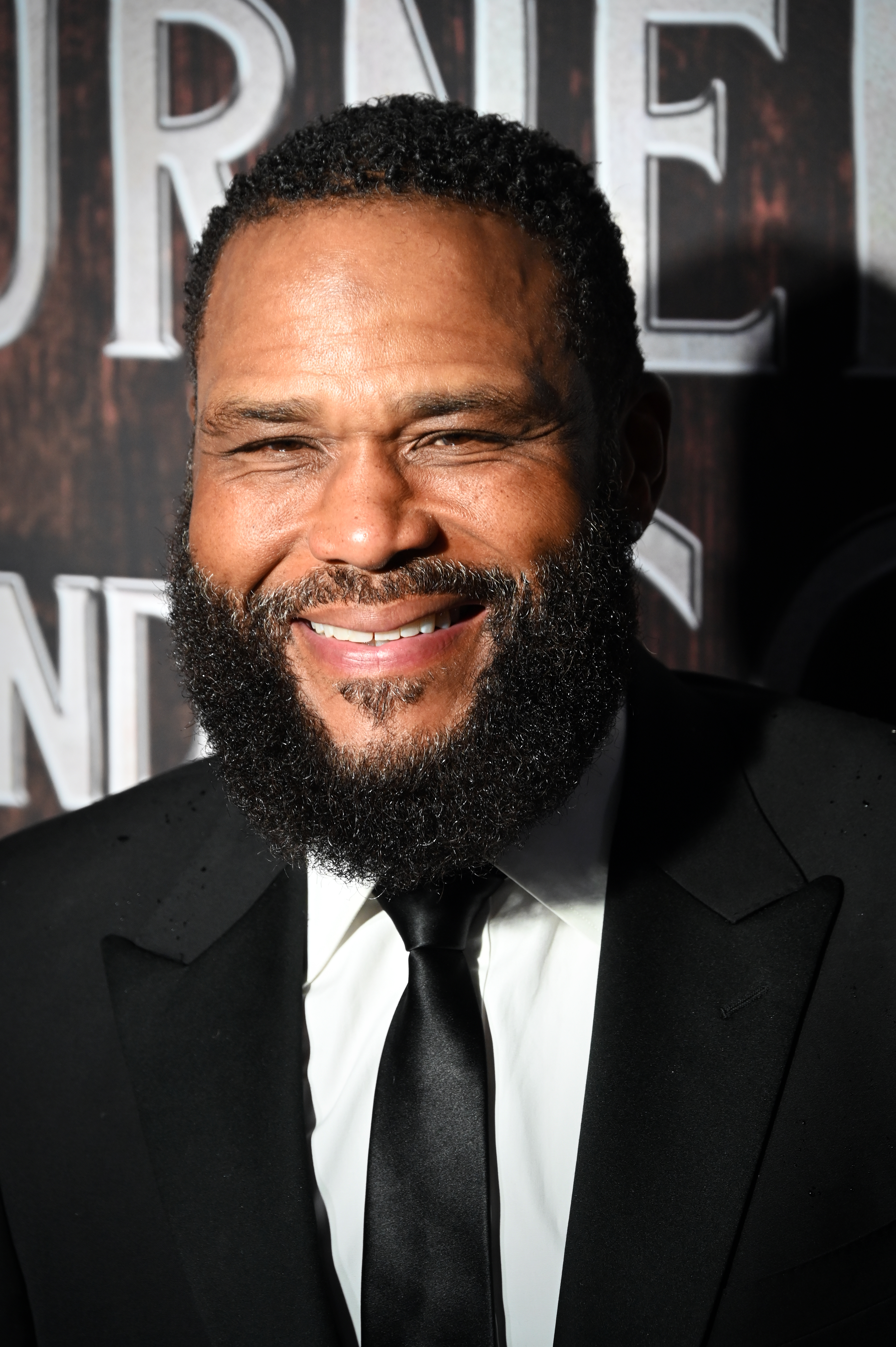
- Anderson in 2026
- Born: August 15, 1970 (age 56); Compton, California, U.S.
- Education: Howard University (BFA)
- Occupations: Actor; comedian; host
- Years active: 1995–present
- Spouse: Alvina Stewart (m. 1999; div. 2023)
- Children: 2

Anthony Anderson (born August 15, 1970) is an American actor, comedian, and television host. He is known for his leading roles in television shows such as Andre "Dre" Johnson on the ABC sitcom Black-ish (2014–2022) and NYPD Detective Kevin Bernard on the NBC crime drama Law & Order (2008–2010, 2022). He has also acted in films such as Big Momma's House (2000), Barbershop (2002), Kangaroo Jack (2003), Agent Cody Banks 2 (2004), Hustle & Flow (2005), The Departed (2006), Transformers (2007), and Scream 4 (2011).

Anderson starred in the short-lived sitcoms All About the Andersons (2003–2004) and Guys with Kids (2012–2013). Anderson has also hosted or been a guest panelist on a variety of game shows. Anderson served as host of the ABC version of the game show To Tell the Truth (2016–2022) and he is the host of the Fox game show We Are Family (2024–). He hosted the 75th Primetime Emmy Awards in 2024. In 2025, he was named host of Netflix’s reboot of the talent competition series Star Search to debut the following year.

== Early life ==
Anderson was born in Compton, California. His mother, Doris Bowman (née Hancox), was a telephone operator and actress. His stepfather, Sterling Bowman, was a native of Little Rock, Arkansas, who moved to Los Angeles to work in the steel mill industry before opening a chain of three clothing stores. Sterling died in 2022. Anderson has a younger half-brother, Derrick Bowman, who works as an ICU nurse. Growing up, Anderson's nickname was "Tugga" because he could not pronounce the word "sugar". According to a DNA analysis, Anderson descends from the Bubi people of Bioko Island (Equatorial Guinea), and from the Tikar, Hausa, and Fulani people of Cameroon.

Anderson has stated that his first attempt at stand-up comedy was a failure. Although this experience was a blow to his ego, he met his future friend and fellow comedic actor Guy Torry there, who consoled him after the show and encouraged him to keep getting up on stage. He and Torry later acted together in the 1999 film Life, alongside Eddie Murphy and Martin Lawrence.

Anderson is an alumnus of the Hollywood High School Performing Arts Magnet's Class of 1988. He initially enrolled at Howard University as a theater major but faced financial difficulties, leading him to leave after his junior year. Nearly three decades later, inspired by his son Nathan's acceptance to the university, he returned to Howard to complete his Bachelor of Fine Arts degree at the Chadwick A. Boseman College of Fine Arts in 2022.

== Career ==
=== 1995–2004: Early roles and sitcom ===
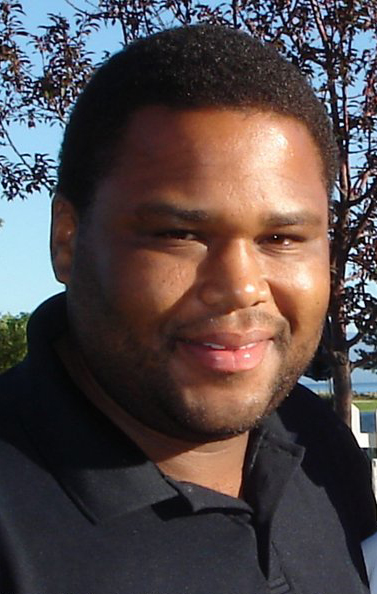
Anderson in 2006

Anderson's early television work includes a lead role as Teddy Broadis in the teen series Hang Time, and many one-off guest appearances on shows such as NYPD Blue, Malcolm & Eddie, In the House, and Ally McBeal, as well as recurring roles on series like 'Til Death and The Bernie Mac Show. Anderson has worked as an actor, often in comedic roles, since his film debut in Liberty Heights (1999). In 2002, he voiced the character Ray Ray in an episode of the Disney Channel animated series The Proud Family. He later reprised this role in a second-season episode of its revival series The Proud Family: Louder and Prouder, which aired in 2023.

From 2003 to 2004, he was the central character in the short-lived series All About the Andersons, which lasted for one season on The WB. He also had leading film roles in the comedy films Kangaroo Jack (2003), My Baby's Daddy (2004), and King's Ransom (2005), with a supporting role in the family adventure film Agent Cody Banks 2: Destination London (2004).

=== 2005–2014: Film and television roles ===
Anderson took supporting roles in the drama Hustle & Flow (2005), and Martin Scorsese's crime film The Departed (2006). Additionally, Anderson had a supporting role in Scary Movie 3 (2003) and Scary Movie 4 (2006). He was originally set to return in Scary Movie 5 (2013) with Regina Hall and Kevin Hart. Anderson joined the cast of the long-running NBC crime drama television series, Law & Order in 2008. After three seasons (18, 19, and 20) as Kevin Bernard, he reprised the role upon the series' revival in 2022, concurrent with the final episodes of Black-ish.

In 2009, Anderson directed a one-minute short film featuring his Law & Order co-star Jeremy Sisto. The short was made for the Responsibility Project, a joint initiative of NBC and Liberty Mutual Group. The short aired during the In The House episode "Reality Bites" in October 2009. In June 2010, he was cast in a minor role in Scream 4.

Before his work in Law & Order, Anderson starred in two other crime series, Fox's K-Ville (as one of the lead characters) and FX's The Shield. He also starred in the sitcom Guys with Kids, which lasted a single season. In 2013, Anderson signed on to host the celebrity-driven, family game show called Wall of Fame, which was produced by Endemol USA for NBC. Eight one-hour episodes were taped at the time, but never aired. Anderson's series Eating America with Anthony Anderson was a summer show in 2014. He visited different towns in America that host "food festivals" highlighting a specific type of food. He was a frequent judge on Iron Chef America, and was one of the few judges to taste dishes from all the Iron Chefs on the show. In the Ultimate Bar Food battle, he served as bartender/sous-chef for Iron Chef Bobby Flay opposite Masaharu Morimoto and fellow judge Simon Majumdar.

=== 2014–2022: Black-ish and involvement in game shows ===
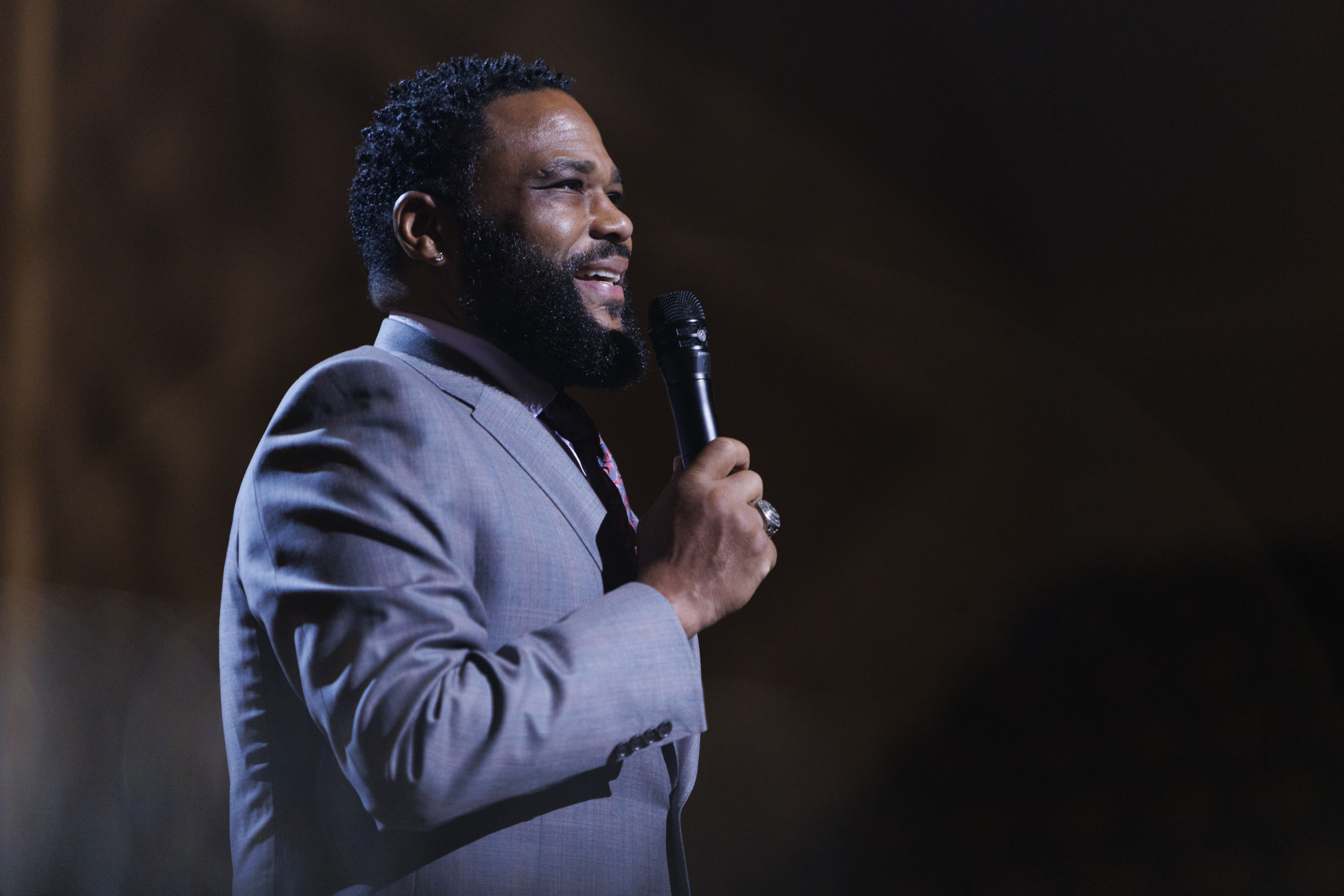
Anderson hosts the Gershwin Prize for Popular Song concert honoring Lionel Richie in 2022

In 2014, Anderson began starring as Andre "Dre" Johnson on the ABC sitcom Black-ish, which completed its eight-season run in 2022. During its run, Anderson received 11 Primetime Emmy Award nominations and three Golden Globe Award nominations. In 2022, Anderson was not nominated as a producer or actor for its final season. He reacted to the news while guest hosting Jimmy Kimmel Live! joking, "Can you believe that shit? Now I'm not saying the voters were stupid for not nominating me or Black-ish or Tracee, I'm just saying they're racist."

He serves as executive producer on its spinoffs Grown-ish, which premiered on Freeform in 2018, and Mixed-ish, which ran on ABC for two seasons from 2019 to 2021. He guest starred as Dre in episodes on both series. From 2016 to 2022, he was the host of To Tell the Truth, which also aired on ABC.

In 2019, Anderson was a guest panelist in season two of The Masked Singer. He later competed in season ten as "Rubber Ducky" and was eliminated in the first episode when competing in Group A. In October 2022, Anderson and his mother Doris began filming Anthony Anderson and Mom: European Vacation to be aired on the E! network.

=== 2023–present: We Are Family and controversy ===
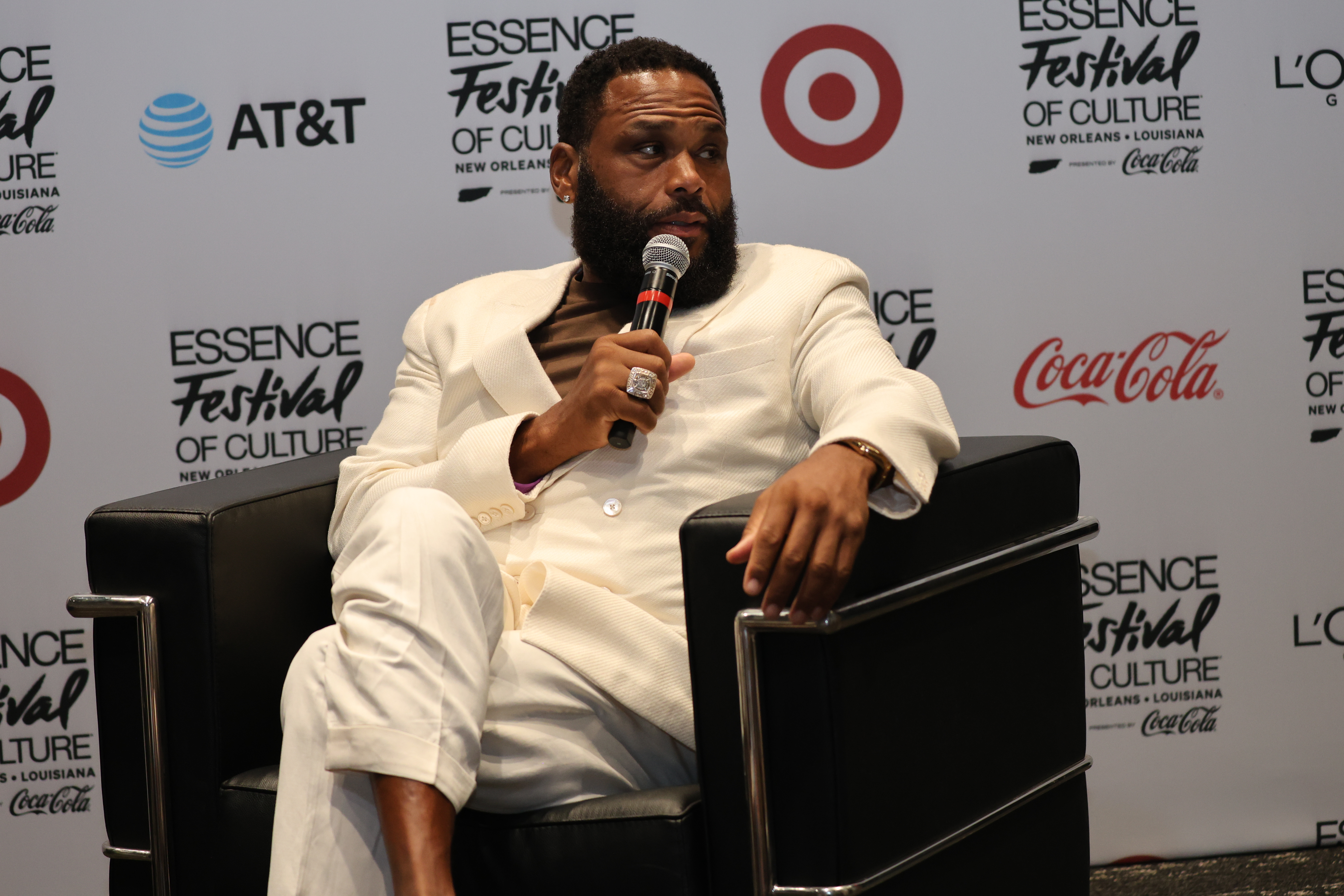
Anderson in 2025

In November 2023, it was announced that Anderson and his mother Doris would host the Fox game show We Are Family, replacing Jamie Foxx and his daughter, Corinne, who were originally set to host the show. It premiered on January 3, 2024.

In December 2023, Anderson was named as the host of the 75th Primetime Emmy Awards. The decision for Anderson to host was met with controversy due to his multiple allegations of rape and sexual assault. The Sexual Violence Prevention Association (SVPA) urged the Emmys and Fox, the network set to air the 2024 ceremony, to reconsider Anderson as host writing, "The entertainment industry has the power and responsibility to protect individuals from sexual violence...the Emmys and Fox to not only remove Anderson as host, but to also conduct their due diligence going forward when selecting hosts."

The telecast was met with mixed reviews and some criticism, in particular, regarding a recurring bit in which Anderson's mother interrupted acceptance speeches that went on too long. Some on social media cited the moment when Anderson's mother interrupted a speech given by Jennifer Coolidge, who won for The White Lotus, as being "rude" and "disrespectful".

== Personal life ==
Anderson was married to Alvina Stewart from September 1999 to September 2023. They have two children. Their son Nathan appeared as Tahj in the Netflix sitcom Richie Rich and guest starred in Black-ish. Stewart initially filed for divorce in September 2015 citing irreconcilable differences, after having been separated since April 2014. They reconciled in January 2017 and she withdrew her petition. On March 25, 2022, she filed for divorce again, and it was granted by a judge in September 2023.

Anderson has type 2 diabetes and has been active in diabetes awareness.

Playing for the Alzheimer's Association, in 2011, Anderson won $250,000 on Who Wants to Be a Millionaire.

Anderson is an honorary member of Omega Psi Phi fraternity. He was inducted in July 2020. In 2019, a star was named after Anderson in the International Star Registry.

Anderson owns a restaurant with friend and comedian Cedric the Entertainer.

Anderson, who graduated from Howard University’s Chadwick A. Boseman College of Fine Arts in 2022, announced on TV One’s Uncensored he will be returning to his alma mater to teach a masterclass in acting.

=== Rape and sexual assault allegations ===
Anderson was accused of raping a 25-year-old extra in a trailer on the film set of Hustle & Flow on July 27, 2004. The alleged victim accused Anderson and assistant director Wayne Witherspoon of forcibly removing her clothing, photographing her naked body, and sexually assaulting her. A witness claimed to have heard the alleged victim's screams and to have seen her run naked from the trailer, and she was treated at St. Francis Hospital. The charges were dropped on October 6, 2004, because the judge ruled that there was no probable cause to try the case. Anderson was sued for sexual assault in September 2004 by another woman who claimed that Anderson made sexually suggestive remarks and then assaulted her in his dressing room on the set of All About the Andersons.

On July 20, 2018, it was revealed that he was being investigated by the Los Angeles Police Department for another sexual assault allegation. On September 4, the Los Angeles District Attorney's Office declined to press charges, citing lack of evidence after the alleged victim declined to be interviewed by the investigating officer.

== Filmography ==
=== Film ===
Year	Title	Role	Notes
1996	Alien Avengers	Alley Hood #2	TV movie
1999	The Breaks	Inmate #1	
1999	Life	"Cookie"	
1999	Trippin'	"Z-Boy"	
1999	Liberty Heights	"Scribbles"	
2000	3 Strikes	Guard	
2000	Romeo Must Die	Maurice	
2000	Big Momma's House	Nolan	
2000	Me, Myself & Irene	Jamaal Baileygates	
2000	Urban Legends: Final Cut	Stan Washington	
2001	Kingdom Come	Junior Slocumb	
2001	See Spot Run	Benny	
2001	Exit Wounds	T.K. Johnson	
2001	Two Can Play That Game	Tony	
2002	Barbershop	J.D.	
2003	Kangaroo Jack	Louis Booker	
2003	Cradle 2 the Grave	Tommy	
2003	Malibu's Most Wanted	P.J. "Tree"	
2003	Scary Movie 3	Mahalik Phifer	
2004	My Baby's Daddy	"G"	
2004	Agent Cody Banks 2: Destination London	Derek Bowman	
2004	Harold & Kumar Go to White Castle	Burger Shack Employee	
2005	Hustle & Flow	Key	
2005	King's Ransom	Malcolm King	
2005	Hoodwinked!	Bill Stork (voice)	
2006	Scary Movie 4	Mahalik Phifer	
2006	The Last Stand	Jay	
2006	The Departed	Trooper Brown	
2006	Arthur & the Invisibles	Koolomassai (voice)	
2007	Transformers	Glen Whitmann	
2009	Steppin: The Movie	Uncle Trevor	
2009	Matumbo Goldberg	Matumbo Goldberg	Short
2010	The Back-Up Plan	Playground dad	
2010	A Turtle's Tale: Sammy's Adventures	Ray (voice)	
2011	Scream 4	Deputy Perkins	
2011	The Big Year	Bill Clemens	
2012	Goats	Coach	
2013	Pororo, The Racing Adventure	Fufu (voice)	
2013	The Power of Few	"Junkshow"	
2013	Grudge Match	Mr. Sandpaper Hands	
2014	The Town That Dreaded Sundown	Ranger "Lone Wolf" Morales	
2016	Hot Bot	Agent Frazier	
2016	Barbershop: The Next Cut	J.D.	
2016	Slope of the Curve	Himself (voice)	Short
2017	Small Town Crime	Mr. Banks	
2017	The Star	Zach (voice)	
2017	Ferdinand	Bones (voice)	
2019	Beats	Romelo Reese	
2023	You People	Barber #1	
2025	G20	Derek Sutton	
2026	Scary Movie	Himself	
2026	Misty Green	Officer Wood	

=== Television ===
Year	Title	Role	Notes
1995–1996	In the House	Eddie; "Snacks"	Episodes: "Nanna Don't Play"; "Close Encounters of the Worst Kind"
1996	Night Stand with Dick Dietrick	Mickey	Episode: "Salute to Getting Off Easy"
1996–1998	Hang Time	Teddy Brodis	39 episodes
1998	NYPD Blue	Vondell	Episode: "Weaver of Hate"
2000	Ally McBeal	Matthew Vault	Episodes: "Prime Suspect" and "The Oddball Parade"
2001	My Wife and Kids	Dr. Buchay	2 episodes
2001	The Weakest Link	Himself / Celebrity Guest	1 episode
2002	The Proud Family	Ray Ray (voice)	Episode: "Behind Family Lines"
2003–2004	All About the Andersons	Anthony Anderson	16 episodes
2004–2005	The Shield	Antwon Mitchell	15 episodes
2005	The Bernie Mac Show	Bryan Brown	4 episodes (season 5)
2005	Veronica Mars	Percy "Bone" Hamilton	Episode: "Lord of the Bling"
2005	Entourage	Himself	Episode: "Neighbors"
2005	Chappelle's Show	Shirtless Man	Episode 2.9; "Don't Pitch Me" sketch
2006	Law & Order: Special Victims Unit	Lucius Blaine	Episode: "Fat"
2006–2007	'Til Death	Cofeld	6 episodes
2007	K-Ville	Marlin Boulet	11 episodes
2008–2010, 2022	Law & Order	Detective Kevin Bernard	Series regular (seasons 18–21)
2008	Samantha Who?	Rafael Grace	Episode: "Out of Africa"
2010	Golf in America	Host	10 episodes
2010–2013	Treme	Derek Watson	4 episodes
2011	Shameless	Marty Fisher	Episode: "Three Boys"
2011	Family BrainSurge	Himself	
2011	Who Wants to Be a Millionaire	Himself	Contestant
2012	Psych	Chef Thane Woodson	Episode: "True Grits"
2012	Raising Hope	Neighbor	Episode: "Inside Probe (Part 1)"
2012	The Soul Man	"Sweet Brown" Taylor	Episode: "Revelations"
2012–2013	Guys with Kids	Gary	18 episodes
2013	Hell's Kitchen	Himself	Episode: "Winner Chosen" (Note: Appeared alongside his son as chef's table guests in Ja'Nel Witt's kitchen)
2013	Real Husbands of Hollywood	Himself	Episode: "Rock, Paper, Stealers"
2013	Chopped	Himself	Episode: "Celebrity Holiday Bash"
2013–2014	Hollywood Game Night	Himself	2 episodes
2014	Rake	Reggie Jarvis	Episode: "Three Strikes"
2014	Celebrities Undercover	Himself	
2014	Eating America with Anthony Anderson	Himself / Host	Food Network show; also executive producer (8 episodes)
2014–2022	Black-ish	Andre "Dre" Johnson Sr./Narrator	Lead role; also executive producer
2015, 2019	Celebrity Family Feud	Himself	Episodes: "Anderson vs. Braxton", "Black-ish vs. The Goldbergs"
2015	Carnival Cravings with Anthony Anderson	Himself / Host	Food Network show; also executive producer (6 episodes)
2015–2018	Blaze and the Monster Machines	Pirate Pegwheel (voice)	3 episodes
2016	Lip Sync Battle	Himself	Episode: "Tracee Ellis Ross vs. Anthony Anderson"
2016	Richie Rich	Bulldozah	Episode: "Rapper'$ Delight"
2016	The $100,000 Pyramid	Himself / Celebrity Guest	Episode: "Anthony Anderson vs. Sherri Shepherd"
2016	Doc McStuffins	Stanley (voice)	Episode: "Welcome to McStuffinsville"
2016–2022	To Tell the Truth	Himself / Host	
2017–2022	Jimmy Kimmel Live!	Himself / Guest Host	3 episodes; fill-in for Jimmy Kimmel (Note: his mother Doris accompanies Guillermo as sidekick)
2017	The Gong Show	Himself / Judge	Episode: "Dana Carvey/Tracee Ellis Ross/Anthony Anderson"
2017	Drop the Mic	Himself	Episode: "Halle Berry vs. James Corden / Anthony Anderson vs. Usher"
2017	Animal Nation with Anthony Anderson	Himself / Host	10 episodes
2017	Funny You Should Ask	Himself	2 episodes
2018–2023	Grown-ish	Andre "Dre" Johnson Sr.	8 episodes; also, executive producer
2019	Mixed-ish	Andre "Dre" Johnson Sr.	Episode: "Becoming Bow"; also executive producer
2019	Live in Front of a Studio Audience	Uncle Henry Jefferson; Himself	Episode: "Norman Lear's All in the Family and The Jeffersons" "All in the Family and Good Times"
2019	The Late Late Show with James Corden	Himself / Guest Host	December 11, 2019
2020	Extreme Makeover: Home Edition	Himself	Guest
2020	#KidsTogether: The Nickelodeon Town Hall	Himself	Television special
2020	Who Wants to Be a Millionaire	Himself	Contestant
2020	Mo Willems: Don't Let the Pigeon Do Storytime!	Himself / Guest Host	September 17, 2020
2022	Norman Lear: 100 Years of Music & Laughter	Himself	Television special
2022	Harry & Meghan	Himself	Cameo
2022	The Drew Barrymore Show	Himself	Guest
2023	The Proud Family: Louder and Prouder	Ray Ray (voice)	Episode: "The Soul Vibrations"
2023	Hot Wheels: Ultimate Challenge	Himself / Celebrity Guest	Episode: "Monster Bug vs. Buckaroo"
2023	The Masked Singer	Rubber Ducky	Season 10 contestant; Eliminated in first episode
2024	We Are Family	Himself / Host	
2024	75th Primetime Emmy Awards	Himself / Host	Television special
2024	Lopez vs Lopez	Todd Cheeks	Episode: "Lopez vs Wedding"
2026	The Neighborhood	Clancy Pridgeon	Episode: "Welcome to the Things We Do for Love"

=== Video games ===
Year	Title	Voice role	Notes
2006	Scarface: The World Is Yours	Drug Dealer Brenton	
2007	Def Jam: Icon	Troy "Dollar"	Voice and likeness
2012	Diablo III	Monster voice effects	
2014	Diablo III: Reaper of Souls	Monster voice effects	

=== Music videos ===
Year	Title	Artist	Notes
2000	Breakout	Foo Fighters	promoting Me, Myself & Irene because the song's featured on the film's soundtrack

== Awards and nominations ==
Organizations	Year	Category	Work	Result	Ref.
Black Reel Awards	2002	Best Supporting Actor	Two Can Play That Game	Nominated	
Black Reel Awards	2006	Best Supporting Actor	Hustle & Flow	Nominated	
Critics' Choice Television Awards	2015	Best Actor in a Comedy Series	Black-ish (season 1)	Nominated	
Critics' Choice Television Awards	2016	Best Actor in a Comedy Series	Black-ish (season 2)	Nominated	
Critics' Choice Television Awards	2017	Best Actor in a Comedy Series	Black-ish (season 3)	Nominated	
Critics' Choice Television Awards	2018	Best Actor in a Comedy Series	Black-ish (season 4)	Nominated	
Golden Globe Awards	2016	Best Actor in a Comedy Series	Black-ish (season 2)	Nominated	
Golden Globe Awards	2017	Best Actor in a Comedy Series	Black-ish (season 3)	Nominated	
NAACP Image Awards	2002	Outstanding Supporting Actor in a Motion Picture	Two Can Play That Game	Nominated	
NAACP Image Awards	2003	Outstanding Supporting Actor in a Motion Picture	Barbershop	Nominated	
NAACP Image Awards	2006	Outstanding Actor in a Drama Series	K-Ville	Nominated	
NAACP Image Awards	2009	Outstanding Actor in a Drama Series	Law & Order	Nominated	
NAACP Image Awards	2010	Outstanding Actor in a Drama Series	Law & Order	Nominated	
NAACP Image Awards	2011	Outstanding Actor in a Drama Series	Law & Order	Nominated	
NAACP Image Awards	2013	Outstanding Actor in a Comedy Series	Guys with Kids	Nominated	
NAACP Image Awards	2015	Outstanding Actor in a Comedy Series	Black-ish	Won	
NAACP Image Awards	2016	Outstanding Actor in a Comedy Series	Black-ish	Won	
NAACP Image Awards	2017	Outstanding Actor in a Comedy Series	Black-ish	Won	
NAACP Image Awards	2017	Outstanding Host - Variety (Series or Special)	BET Awards 2016 (as host)	Nominated	
NAACP Image Awards	2018	Outstanding Actor in a Comedy Series	Black-ish	Won	
NAACP Image Awards	2019	Outstanding Actor in a Comedy Series	Black-ish	Won	
NAACP Image Awards	2020	Outstanding Actor in a Comedy Series	Black-ish	Won	
NAACP Image Awards	2021	Outstanding Actor in a Comedy Series	Black-ish	Won	
NAACP Image Awards	2022	Outstanding Actor in a Comedy Series	Black-ish	Won	
Primetime Emmy Awards	2015	Outstanding Lead Actor in a Comedy Series	Black-ish (episode: "Sex, Lies, and Vasectomies")	Nominated	
Primetime Emmy Awards	2016	Outstanding Comedy Series (as a producer)	Black-ish (season 2)	Nominated	
Primetime Emmy Awards	2016	Outstanding Lead Actor in a Comedy Series	Black-ish (episode: "Hope")	Nominated	
Primetime Emmy Awards	2017	Outstanding Comedy Series (as a producer)	Black-ish (season 3)	Nominated	
Primetime Emmy Awards	2017	Outstanding Lead Actor in a Comedy Series	Black-ish (episode: "Lemons")	Nominated	
Primetime Emmy Awards	2018	Outstanding Comedy Series (as producer)	Black-ish (season 4)	Nominated	
Primetime Emmy Awards	2018	Outstanding Lead Actor in a Comedy Series	Black-ish (episode: "Advance to Go (Collect $200)")	Nominated	
Primetime Emmy Awards	2019	Outstanding Lead Actor in a Comedy Series	Black-ish (episode: "Purple Rain")	Nominated	
Primetime Emmy Awards	2020	Outstanding Lead Actor in a Comedy Series	Black-ish (episode: "Love, Boat")	Nominated	
Primetime Emmy Awards	2021	Outstanding Comedy Series (as a producer)	Black-ish (season 7)	Nominated	
Primetime Emmy Awards	2021	Outstanding Lead Actor in a Comedy Series	Black-ish (episode: "What About Gary?")	Nominated	
Screen Actors Guild Awards	2005	Outstanding Cast in a Motion Picture	Hustle & Flow	Nominated	
Screen Actors Guild Awards	2006	Outstanding Cast in a Motion Picture	The Departed	Nominated	
Screen Actors Guild Awards	2016	Outstanding Actor in a Comedy Series	Black-ish (season 2)	Nominated	
Screen Actors Guild Awards	2016	Outstanding Ensemble in a Comedy Series	Black-ish (season 2)	Nominated	
Screen Actors Guild Awards	2017	Outstanding Actor in a Comedy Series	Black-ish (season 3)	Nominated	
Screen Actors Guild Awards	2017	Outstanding Ensemble in a Comedy Series	Black-ish (season 3)	Nominated	
Teen Choice Awards	2004	Choice TV Actor – Comedy	All About the Andersons	Nominated	
Teen Choice Awards	2015	Choice TV Actor – Comedy	Black-ish	Nominated	
Teen Choice Awards	2017	Choice TV Actor – Comedy	Black-ish	Nominated	
Teen Choice Awards	2019	Choice TV Actor – Comedy	Black-ish	Nominated	
