= Aloe Blacc =

American singer (born 1979)

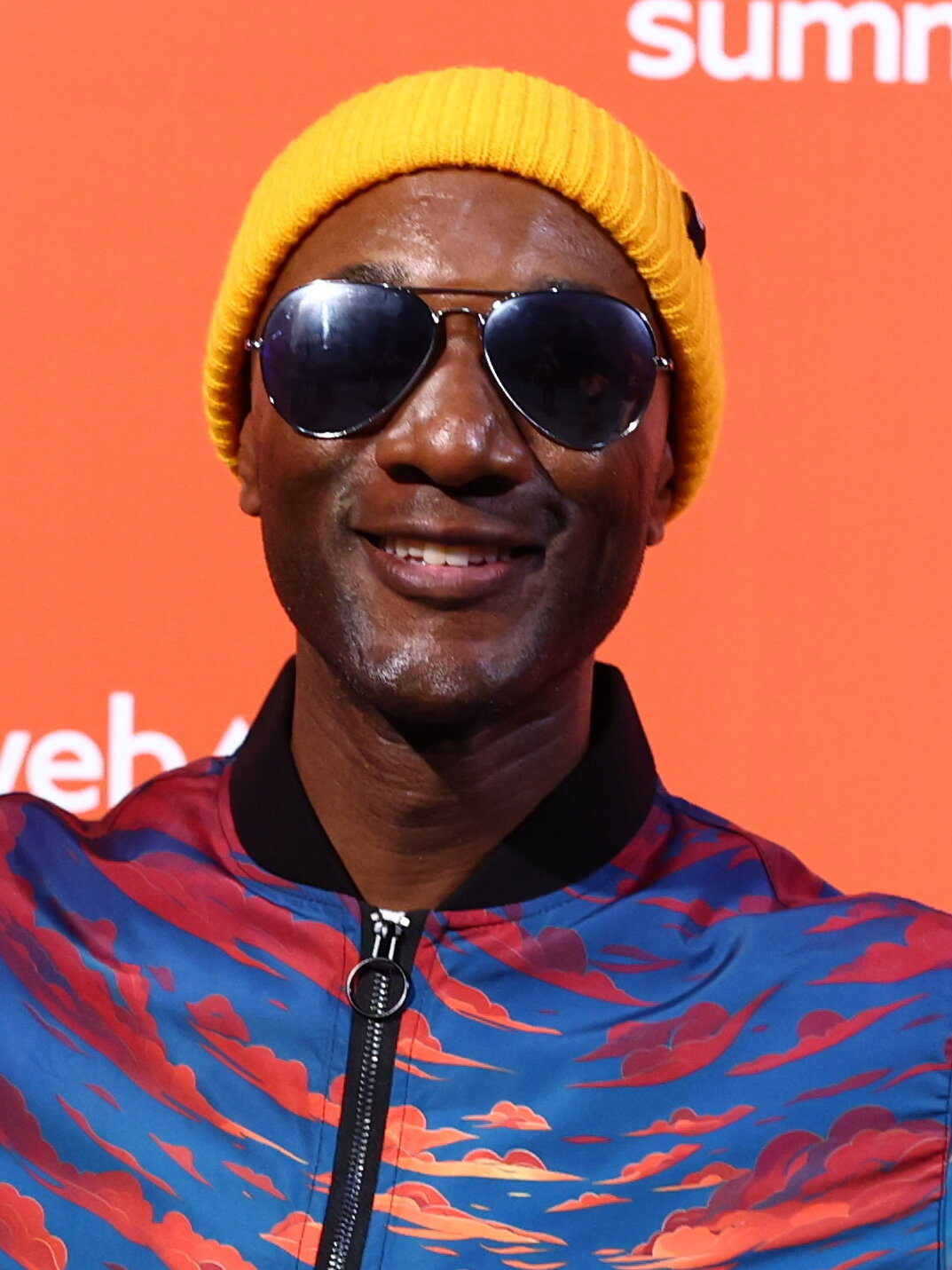
- Aloe Blacc in 2025

Background information
- Born: Egbert Nathaniel Dawkins III; January 7, 1979 (age 47); Laguna Hills, California, U.S.
- Genres: R&B; soul; hip-hop; pop
- Occupations: Singer; songwriter; rapper; record producer
- Instrument: Vocals
- Works: Discography
- Years active: 1995–present
- Labels: Stones Throw; Goontrax; XIX Recordings; Interscope; Dirty Science; Shaman Work
- Member of: Emanon
- Spouse: Maya Jupiter (m. 2010)
- Children: 2
- Website: www.aloeblacc.com

Egbert Nathaniel Dawkins III (born January 7, 1979), known professionally as Aloe Blacc (/ˈæloʊ ˈblæk/), is an American singer, songwriter, rapper, and record producer. He is known for his guest performance on Avicii's 2013 single "Wake Me Up", which topped the charts in 22 countries, including in Australia and the UK. As a lead artist, he is known for his singles "I Need a Dollar" and "The Man", the latter of which reached number one on the UK singles chart. Aside from his solo career, Aloe Blacc is also a member of the hip-hop duo Emanon, alongside American record producer Exile.

== Early life ==
Egbert Nathaniel Dawkins III was born on January 7, 1979, in Orange County, California, to Panamanian parents. Growing up in Laguna Hills, he began playing a rented trumpet in third grade. When it made more sense to buy the instrument, Dawkins had what he later described as a "very specific moment" in his evolution as a musician: "It forced me to be serious about it. I couldn't just do it to get out of the classroom", he said in a 2010 interview. His exposure to LL Cool J in fourth grade was equally significant. "It wasn't too far off from the trumpet moment...I had a hip hop moment and a musician moment".

A Renaissance Scholar at the University of Southern California, Dawkins majored in linguistics and psychology and graduated in 2001. He worked briefly in the corporate sector for Ernst & Young.

== Career ==
=== 1995–2002: Early career ===
In 1995, Aloe Blacc teamed with hip hop producer Exile and formed Emanon—"no name" backwards—which was inspired by the title of the Dizzy Gillespie song "Emanon". With breakbeat loops and jazz samples, Emanon became a mainstay of the indie rap underground and released their first mixtape in 1996, followed by the EP Acid 9 in 1999. They subsequently published six projects: the demo album Imaginary Friends (1996), a compilation called Steps Through Time (2001), the albums The Waiting Room (2005) and Dystopia (2016), and the EPs Acid 9 (1998) and Anon & On (2002). A fourth album, Bird's Eye View, was recorded but shelved. While Emanon was Aloe Blacc's primary project during this period, he additionally toured and recorded with the members of the collective Lootpack and worked with the French jazz group Jazz Liberatorz.

Emanon appeared as contestants on a 1998 episode of MTV's The Cut.

=== 2003–2009: Shine Through ===
Aloe Blacc launched his career as a solo artist in 2003, releasing two EPs and signing to Stones Throw Records in 2006, after label head Chris Manak heard him sing and immediately offered him a contract for the 2006 full-length Shine Through. By then, Aloe Blacc had become more focused on songwriting, a change inspired in part by his social consciousness: "I was uncomfortable with the state of hip hop being largely about the expression of ego. I wondered how I could be more crafty at writing songs in the form of a rap that actually expressed more than ego, style and finesse," he stated. "I figured I would educate myself to learn more about songwriting and apply that later to hip hop."

Shine Through was Aloe Blacc's first full-length album and was released in 2006. It received significant media attention in the U.S. and abroad. Pitchfork wrote that Shine Through had "flashes of keen musical interpolation" and signaled "some sort of greatness", NPR named the track "Nascimento" as song of the day, and Absolute Punk noted that Shine Through flows beautifully from one track to the next, infusing old-school funk and soul with a modern essence that makes it incredibly unique.

Also in 2009, while working on his second album, Aloe Blacc toured Europe and the United States with Emanon and collaborated with the Japanese hip hop producer Cradle on a project called Bee.

In 2006, Aloe Blacc attended Melbourne's Red Bull Music Academy.

=== 2010–2011: Good Things ===
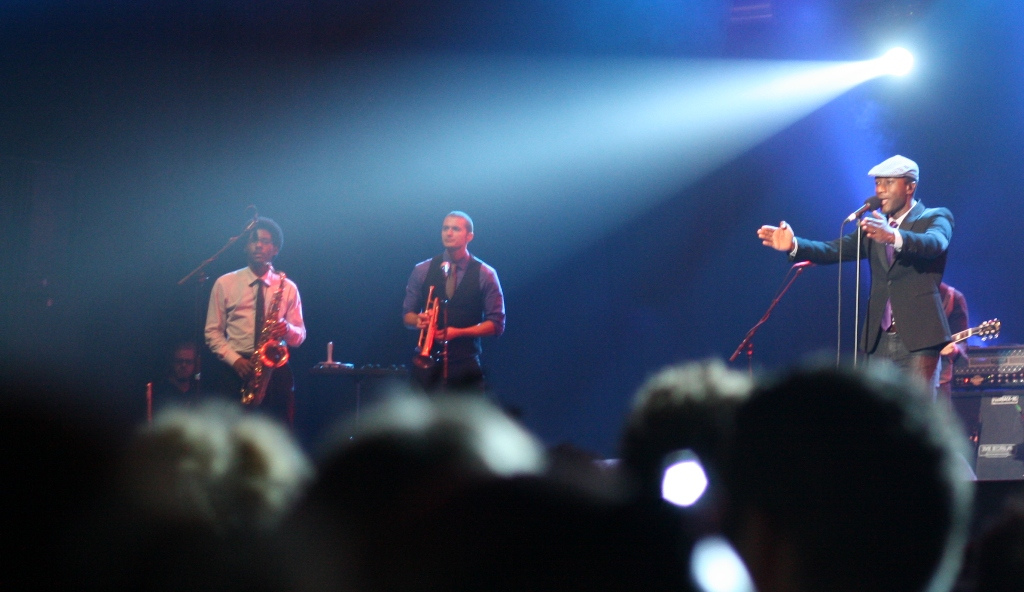
Aloe Blacc with Randal Fisher (saxophone) and Chris Bautista (trumpet) live at the NSJ Festival, Rotterdam, July 8, 2012.

In 2010, Aloe Blacc released Good Things on Stones Throw Records. A commercial success, the album was certified gold in the UK, France, Germany, and Australia, among other countries, and ultimately hit double platinum sales. The single "I Need A Dollar", which was used as the theme song to the HBO series How to Make It in America, reached one million in sales in 2013. Two additional singles, "Loving You Is Killing Me" and "Green Lights", became European hits as well. Good Things was praised by the media, receiving positive reviews in the Los Angeles Times, The New York Times, Spin, NME, and Entertainment Weekly, among others. Shortly after the release of the record, Aloe Blacc signed with Simon Fuller's XIX Management.

In 2011, Aloe Blacc contributed a track to the album Red Hot + Rio 2, a follow-up to the 1996 Red Hot + Rio, with all proceeds donated to raise money and awareness to fight AIDS/HIV and related health and social issues. That year, he performed on the main stages at major festivals such as Glastonbury and Falls Festival in Australia with his primary touring band, the Grand Scheme. In 2012, he appeared at the North Sea Jazz festival in Rotterdam, Lollapalooza in Chicago, and Osheaga in Montreal.

=== 2012–present: Major label debut Lift Your Spirit ===
In 2012, Aloe Blacc contributed vocals to the debut album by the French music project Roseaux, established by Emile Omar.

Aloe Blacc was introduced to Swedish DJ Avicii by Linkin Park's co-vocalist Mike Shinoda. As a result, in 2013, Aloe Blacc co-wrote the song "Wake Me Up" with Avicii. With Aloe Blacc on vocals, the song reached number one in 103 countries and became the fastest-selling single in the UK, with 267,000 copies sold in its first week. He also collaborated with Avicii on a track called "Liar Liar" that featured Blondfire. In September of that year, Aloe Blacc signed with Interscope Records and released an EP, titled Wake Me Up. The five-track album included the songs "Love Is the Answer", "Can You Do This", and "Ticking Bomb", as well as an acoustic version of "Wake Me Up". "Ticking Bomb" was used as the background music in a Battlefield 4 TV ad, and "The Man" appeared in Beats by Dr. Dre commercials featuring Kevin Garnett, Colin Kaepernick, Richard Sherman, and Cesc Fàbregas.

In October 2013, Aloe Blacc released a music video for the track "Wake Me Up", in collaboration with the immigrant rights group National Day Laborer Organizing Network and the ABC* Foundation's Healing Power of Music Initiative. The director was Alex Rivera, and the cast consisted of immigrant activists.

Aloe Blacc's Interscope/XIX debut, Lift Your Spirit, was released in November 2013 and featured production by Pharrell, DJ Khalil, and songwriter Harold Lilly, among others. In the UK, he helped promote his album by performing tracks from it on Later... with Jools Holland.

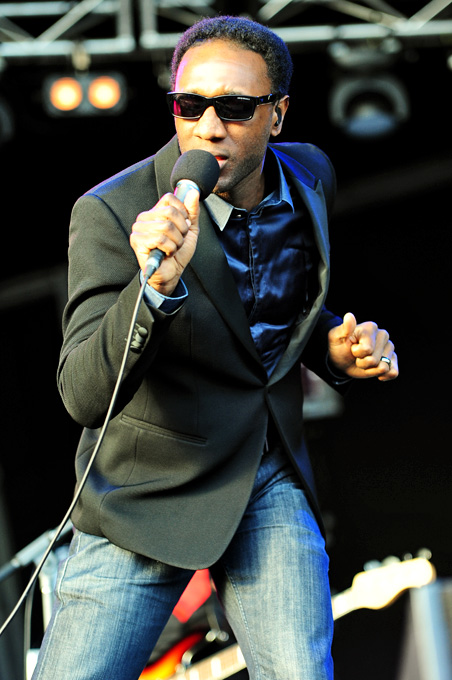
Aloe Blacc in 2012

Aloe Blacc features on the song "The World Is Ours", from One Love, One Rhythm, a compilation album released for the 2014 FIFA World Cup, held in Brazil in June and July 2014.

Also in 2014, it was announced that Aloe Blacc would be the guest advisor for Adam Levine's team on season 6 of The Voice.

On May 5, 2015, a sneak peek of Owl City's single "Verge", featuring Aloe Blacc, aired on ESPN's Draft Academy. The song was released on May 14.

In February 2016, Aloe Blacc announced his contribution to the film Race, a song called "Let the Games Begin".

In 2016, Exile and Aloe Blacc released their first album as Emanon since 2005, titled Dystopia, which features guest rappers Blu and Cashus King.

In 2017, Aloe Blacc provided vocals for the Tiësto song "Carry You Home".

On May 20, 2018, he performed "Wake Me Up" with Tiësto as part of a tribute to Avicii at Electric Daisy Carnival.

A posthumous song with Avicii, titled "SOS", was released on April 10, 2019. The following month, on May 16, Aloe Blacc was featured on a song with Gryffin, titled "Hurt People".

In 2020, he competed in season four of The Masked Singer as "Mushroom" and finished in second place, behind LeAnn Rimes as the "Sun".

In March 2024, Aloe Blacc featured on an Afro tech remix of Ben E. King's 1961 single "Stand By Me", titled "Darling", by South African DJ and record producer Shimza. In May 2024, he announced that he would release a two-part series of EPs, titled Rock My Soul, consisting of soul covers of rock songs. The first volume was released on June 7 and the second on June 28.

== Philanthropy ==
Aloe Blacc is actively involved in Malaria No More, a charity whose mission is to end malaria deaths through "engaging leaders, rallying the public, and delivering life-saving tools and education to families across Africa".

== Personal life ==
Aloe Blacc is married to Mexican-Australian rapper Maya Jupiter. In 2013, they had their first child, a daughter. In January 2016, they had a son.

== Awards ==
=== Brit Award ===
Year	Nominee / work	Award	Result
2012	Aloe Blacc	Best International Breakthrough Act	Nominated
2012	Aloe Blacc	Best International Male Solo Artist	Nominated

- 2011 Soul Train Awards – Centric Award (nomination)
- 2011 Worker's Voice Award
- 2014 BET Awards – Centric Award (nominated)

=== Grammy Award ===
Year	Nominee / work	Award	Result
2015	Lift Your Spirit	Best R&B Album	Nominated

== Selected screen appearances ==
- 2013 – Dancing with the Stars – season 17, episode 5
- 2014 – Dancing with the Stars – season 19, episode 2
- 2014 – Get On Up as Nafloyd Scott
- 2016 – Beat Bugs as Boris the Frog, singing "Rain"
- 2017 – Black-ish
- 2019 – Songland – season 1, episode 6
- 2019 – Godfather of Harlem
- 2020 – The Masked Singer as "Mushroom" (runner-up) – season 4
- 2021 – The Bachelor – season 25, episode 7
- 2022 – The Wonder Years – season 1, episode 20
- 2022 – Harriet the Spy – season 1, episode 6
- 2024 – Kindergarten: The Musical as Papi

== Discography ==
Studio albums

- Shine Through (2006)
- Good Things (2010)
- Lift Your Spirit (2013)
- Christmas Funk (2018)
- All Love Everything (2020)
- Stand Together (2025)
