= Scarlet Spencer =

American actress

- Born: February 28, 2007 (age 19)
- Occupation: Actress
- Years active: 2014–present

Scarlet Spencer (born February 28, 2007) is an American teen actress. She played Ivy in the Nickelodeon sitcom series Cousins for Life and Izzy in the Netflix series BlackAF.

== Career ==
Spencer started her career by going to numerous film schools and participating in theatre productions. She was featured in several commercials and modelling shoots. In 2018, she was cast for a role in the Nickelodeon series Cousins for Life as Ivy. In 2019 it was announced that Spencer had landed the role of Izzy in Netflix series BlackAF alongside Kenya Barris, Rashida Jones, Iman Benson and others. BlackAF was released in 2020. She was also featured in the Netflix film Bright as Sofia Ward alongside Will Smith, Joel Edgerton and Noomi Rapace, among others.

== Filmography ==
=== Film ===
Year	Title	Role	Notes
2014	Double-Cross	Tabitha	Short film
2014	The story of Ag-Gag	Movie star kid	A short movie which she played the role of a movie star kid
2015	Gray	Co-Star	Short film
2017	Bright	Sophia Ward	
2018	Hint	Phantom 1	Short film
2017	Thirty-one and done	Amelia	Short film
2020	Promising Young Woman	Gabby	

=== Television ===
Year	Title	Role	Notes
2015	Awkward	Cute girl	
2016	Teachers	Amelia	
2016	Colony	Becca	
2017	Black-ish	Young Santamonica	
2018	Shameless	Xan	
2019	Cousins for Life	Ivy	
2020	Mildred & Maggie	Penny	TV mini series
2020	BlackAF	Izzy	
