= Dallas Dupree Young =

American actor (born 2006)

- Born: October 25, 2006 (age 19); Cypress, Texas, U.S.
- Occupation: Actor
- Years active: 2016–present
- Father: Eric Young Sr.
- Relatives: Eric Young Jr. (half-brother)

Dallas Dupree Young (born October 25, 2006) is an American actor best known for his recurring role in The Fosters, and his starring role in the Nickelodeon sitcom Cousins for Life. In 2021, he joined the cast of the Netflix series Cobra Kai, a sequel to The Karate Kid films.

== Early life ==
Young was born and raised in Houston, Texas. He is the son of Major League Baseball player Eric Young Sr. and his wife Beyonka Jackson. His older brother, Eric Young Jr., is also a professional baseball player. Young dreamed of becoming a professional athlete like his father and brother. He had aspirations of playing for the Colorado Rockies like they did. In addition to baseball, Young also loves basketball and football. Between the ages of 5 and 6, Young studied karate. He would later take kickboxing lessons as well.

Though he was sure he would become a baseball player, plans changed when a neighbor encouraged Young to go into acting. Young credited shows he grew up watching such as, Family Matters, Hannah Montana and Jessie, with helping him discover his passion for acting. He later met with talent scout Diana Horner. Young was invited to attend an acting showcase in Los Angeles where he met his manager. His manager then introduced him to an agent and Young began booking jobs immediately. He credits Denzel Washington as his biggest influence.

== Career ==
Young began acting at age 9 when he appeared in a short film. He later made his television debut in Investigation Discovery's documentary television series, Murder Among Friends. He filmed his audition on his on his manager's front lawn and he booked the gig the very next day. He would go on to appear in episodes of Shameless, The Mayor, The Good Place and The Fosters. He also landed a small role in the 2018 sci-fi film Ready Player One. In 2018, Young landed his first leading role when he was cast as Stuart in the Nickelodeon sitcom Cousins for Life, created by Kevin Kopelow and Heath Seifert. In 2019, he appeared in two episodes of ABC's Mixed-ish. Young was later cast in the Willie Aikens biopic The Royal.

In 2020, Young appeared in an episode of the Fox drama 9-1-1. That year, he would also book a recurring role on another Netflix series, The Big Show Show where he played a character named after singer Taylor Swift. In 2021, Young was cast in the recurring role of Kenny Payne in Netflix's critically acclaimed original series Cobra Kai. At age 15, Young was the youngest member of the cast. Young auditioned for the role in 2020 and the process took approximately three weeks. While he grew up on the original films, Young waited until he booked the role to binge the television series which only added to his excitement. To prepare for the role, he studied martial arts and also researched Bruce Lee and Wesley Snipes to develop his technique for the fight scenes. Young is set to appear in The Royal and has starred in 1-800-Hot-Nite, which released on Paramount+ with Showtime in 2022.

== Filmography ==
Year	Title	Role	Notes
2016	Murder Among Friends	Kevin	Episode: "The Rabbit Hole"
2017	The Good Place	Young Uzo	Episode: "Chidi's Choice"
2017	The Mayor	Elijah	2 episodes
2017	Shameless	De'Andre	Episode: "Fuck Paying It Forward"
2017	Vampirina	Student / Classmates	Voice (4 episodes)
2018	Ready Player One	Elementary Kid	
2018	The Fosters	Corey	3 episodes
2018–2019	Cousins for Life	Stuart	Series regular
2019	Mixed-ish	Rodney	2 episodes
2019	Where's Waldo	Mateo	Voice; episode: "Bahama Drama"
2020	Glitch Techs	Young Casino	Voice; episode: "Smashozaurs"
2020	The Big Show Show	Taylor	Recurring role (5 episodes)
2020	The Main Event	Mason	Netflix original film
2020	9-1-1	Bryce	Episode: "The One That Got Away"
2021–2025	Cobra Kai	Kenny Payne	32 episodes Recurring role (season 4) Main role (seasons 5–6)
2021	Good Trouble	Corey	Episode: "Klompendansen"
2021	Sydney to the Max	Benny	Episode: "Tearin' Up My Room"
2021	The Royal	Young Willie Aikens	
2022	1-800-Hot Nite	Tommy	
2023	Urkel Saves Santa: the Movie	Jordon	Direct-to-Video
