= Black Reel Award for Outstanding Directing, Comedy Series =

Annual US television award

- Awarded for: Outstanding Directing, Comedy Series
- Country: United States
- Presented by: Black Reel Awards for Television
- First award: 2017
- Currently held by: Maurice Marable Woke (2021)
- Website: blackreelawards.com

The Black Reel Award for Television for Outstanding Directing, Comedy Series is an annual award presented to the best directing of a television comedy series for a particular episode.

== 2010s ==
Year	Program	Episode	Nominee	Network
2017; 1st
2017; 1st	Insecure	"Guilty as Fuck"	Debbie Allen	HBO
2017; 1st	Master of None	"Thanksgiving"	Melina Matsoukas	Netflix
2017; 1st	black-ish	"Lemons"	Kenya Barris	ABC
2017; 1st	black-ish	"40 Acres and a Vote"	Ken Whittingham	ABC
2017; 1st	Atlanta	"B.A.N."	Donald Glover	FX
2018 (2nd)
2018 (2nd)	black-ish	"Juneteenth"	Anton Cropper	ABC
2018 (2nd)	Atlanta	"Barbershop"	Donald Glover	FX
2018 (2nd)	Atlanta	"F.U.B.U."	Donald Glover	FX
2018 (2nd)	Insecure	"Hella Perspective"	Melina Matsoukas	HBO
2018 (2nd)	Shameless	"Fuck Paying It Forward"	Regina King	Showtime
2019; 3rd
2019; 3rd	black-ish	"Black Like Us"	Salli Richardson	ABC
2019; 3rd	black-ish	"Black History Month"	Tracee Ellis Ross	ABC
2019; 3rd	black-ish	"Purple Rain"	Charles Stone III	ABC
2019; 3rd	Insecure	"Ghost-Like"	Regina King	HBO
2019; 3rd	Insecure	"High-Like"	Millicent Shelton	HBO

== 2020s ==
Year	Program	Episode	Nominee	Network
2020; 4th
2020; 4th	Dear White People	"Chapter V"	Cheryl Dunye	Netflix
2020; 4th	BlackAF	"still...because of slavery"	Rashida Jones	Netflix
2020; 4th	BlackAF	"yo, between you and me...this is because of slavery"	Kenya Barris	Netflix
2020; 4th	black-ish	"Hair Day"	Anya Adams	ABC
2020; 4th	Insecure	"Lowkey Movin' On"	Stella Meghie	HBO
2021; 5th
2021; 5th	Woke	"Black People for Rent"	Maurice Marable	HBO
2021; 5th	Girls5Eva	"Separ8 Ways"	Chioke Nassor	Peacock
2021; 5th	black-ish	"My Dinner with Andre Junior"	Princess Monique Filmz	ABC
2021; 5th	black-ish	"Our Wedding Dre"	Eric Dean Seaton	ABC
2021; 5th	A Black Lady Sketch Show	"But the Tilapias Are Fine Though, Right?"	Brittany Scott Smith & Lacey Duke	HBO

== Programs with multiple awards ==
2 awards

- black-ish (consecutive)

== Programs with multiple nominations ==
9 nominations

- black-ish

5 nominations

- Insecure

3 nominations

- Atlanta

2 nominations

- BlackAF

== Total awards by network ==
- ABC – 2
- HBO - 1
- HULU - 1
- Netflix - 1

== Individuals with multiple nominations ==
3 nominations

- Donald Glover

2 nominations

- Kenya Barris
- Regina King
- Melina Matsoukas
