= Stripperella =

American animated television series (2003–2004)

- DVD cover R1
- Genre: Superhero; Science fiction
- Created by: Stan Lee
- Based on: Characters created by Stan Lee
- Developed by: Stan Lee; Kevin Kopelow; Heath Seifert
- Starring: Pamela Anderson; Joey Lauren Adams; Mark Hamill; Thomas F. Wilson; Dee Bradley Baker; Jon Cryer; Sirena Irwin; Tom Kenny; Kid Rock; Maurice LaMarche; Vince McMahon; Jill Talley
- Theme music composer: Kid Rock
- Composer: Amotz Plessner
- Country of origin: United States
- Original language: English
- No. of seasons: 1
- No. of episodes: 13

Production
- Executive producers: Stan Lee; Gill Champion; Kevin Kopelow; Heath Seifert; Albie Hecht; Kevin Kay
- Producer: Gerry Anderson
- Running time: 30 minutes
- Production companies: The Firm, Inc.; Network Enterprises; The New TNN Originals (2003) (season 1); Spike TV (2003–2004) (season 1); Nick Digital

Original release
- Network: Spike TV (Note: Episodes 1 and 3-6 aired during the TNN era)
- Release: June 26, 2003 – April 1, 2004

Stripperella (also referred to as Stan Lee's Stripperella) is an American adult animated superhero comedy television series created by Stan Lee for Spike TV. The lead character is a stripper named Erotica Jones who is secretly the superhero/secret agent Stripperella, voiced by Pamela Anderson. The series was produced by The Firm and Spike Animation, with CGI animation provided by Nickelodeon Digital. It is rated TV-MA in the United States.

Stripperella debuted on Spike TV in summer 2003 and lasted one season with 13 episodes. Anderson described it as not being a raunchy show, despite obvious double entendres and topless nudity (which was blurred out when shown on Spike TV).

In Australia, Stripperella began airing uncensored on SBS TV, starting Monday March 13, 2006, at 21:00 local time (9:00PM), after having previously been restricted to early-morning airings on the Nine Network. In the United Kingdom, Stripperella is aired uncensored as part of the UK incarnation of the Cartoon Network's Adult Swim programming block. In Germany, the show aired uncensored on Comedy Central Germany available for all audiences. In Italy, it is aired on Fox Italia, uncensored and unrated; in Latin America is transmitted by MTV Latin America; and in Brazil was transmitted by Multishow. In Singapore, it was broadcast on Arts Central in 2005 at 11:00 pm with a parental guidance rating.

== Production ==
The project was one of the first projects created by Stan Lee's new production company POW! Entertainment, and was originally announced to be running on TNN (later renamed Spike) in January 2003, with Pamela Anderson voicing the lead. Lee, who would only provide the pitch and character outlines before handing the show to other writers, noted it would be a prime-time cartoon and stated "It won't be dirty, but it will be funny." The series planned to use motion capture technology to faithfully show Anderson's anatomy.

It was later delayed to become part of TNN's new adult animation block, alongside The Ren & Stimpy Show and Gary the Rat. Anderson claimed that she and Lee were fans of each other's work, and that she would give notes on the series' scripts.

== Characters ==
=== Stripperella ===
Erotica Jones AKA Stripperella is an extremely attractive dancer. Many people are jealous of Erotica's bust size, especially her coworkers, and she enjoys her extremely revealing outfits because she enjoys showing off her irresistible "assets". She has a brother named Chipperella (Jon Cryer), who also happened to be a stripper living a double life as a superhero and secret agent.

==== Powers ====
- Combat Expertise: "Sexy" martial arts and "Killer" moves.
- Superhuman Enhancements: Enhanced reflexes, senses, super strength, flexibility, intellect, and gravity-defying jumps.
- Extreme Hotness: Stripperella is hot enough to make a man catch fire when near her.
- Powerful Lungs: Stripperella's breathing is strong enough to administer mouth-to-mouth resuscitation on any victim who is either morbidly obese or abnormally gigantic, she can even blow a monkey out of a Tank gun through the barrel.
- Skin Immunity: Stripperella is impervious to temperature and weather conditions, allowing her to wear a bikini in the snow.
- Breast Expansion: Instantly expanding her big bust. She holds her breath and they inflate to increase a few bra-sizes.
- Lie-Detecting Cleave-Conspirators: When someone speaks while holding her breasts, she can determine whether that person is lying.
- Hairachute: Stripperella's hair is so thick, luxuriant, and extravagant that it can be used as an effective parachute.
- Limitless Cleavage: An extreme Victoria's Secret Compartment that allows Stripperella to pull various objects out of her cleavage.

=== Recurring characters ===
- Erotica's workplace TenderLoins features the wishy-washy owner Kevin (voiced by Tom Kenny), swishy bartender Leonard (voiced by Maurice LaMarche), and dancers Persephone (voiced by Sirena Irwin) who is promiscuous and switches accents, and naive and good-natured country girl Giselle (voiced by Jill Talley). The newest member, the antagonistic Catt (voiced by Joey Lauren Adams), gets hired in TenderLoins under false pretenses of being an Amish virgin.
- The main competition of TenderLoins is SiliCones, a strip club owned by Dirk McMahon (voiced by Vince McMahon) who openly admits his obsession for Erotica to work at his club.
- Stripperella works for the agency FUGG under Chief Stroganoff (voiced by Maurice LaMarche). Other recurring FUGG members include technicians Hal and Bernard (voiced by Tom Kenny and Greg Proops), and Special Agent 14 (voiced by Tom Kenny).
- There are two recurring villains: Cheapo (voiced by Maurice LaMarche), the world's cheapest bad guy, and Queen Clitorus (voiced by Sirena Irwin), a woman who lashes out on society for her facial appearance.
- Reporters Skip Withers (voiced by Tom Kenny) and Margo Van Winkle (voiced by Jill Talley) appearing when TV news coverage is needed.

== Episodes ==
Note: what follows is the chronology according to the DVD release. Spike TV aired the episodes out of order. The air dates have not been changed.

No.	Title	Directed by	Written by	Original release date
1	"Beauty and the Obese (Part 1)"	Kevin Altieri	Kevin Kopelow & Heath Seifert	June 26, 2003
In the premiere episode, Stripperella must face-off against her first threat, Dr. Cesarean, a plastic surgeon who's injecting beautiful models with deadly implants that make them gain weight and become obese.
2	"Beauty and the Obese (Part 2)"	Kevin Altieri	Kevin Kopelow & Heath Seifert	October 2, 2003
After discovering the villain responsible for turning several supermodels hideously fat, Stripperella learns that one of them has been "booby-trapped" with a bomb disguised as a breast implant.
3	"Crime Doesn't Pay...Seriously, It Really Doesn't"	Troy Adomitis	Kevin Kopelow & Heath Seifert	July 3, 2003
Stripperella goes up against that low-rate villain, Cheapo, a criminal whose idea of a prime robbery would be knocking over an 89 cent store.
4	"Everybody Loves Pushy"	Troy Adomitis	Kevin Kopelow & Heath Seifert	July 10, 2003
Stripperella discovers the truth behind the success of Pushy Galore's home shopping networks, which is that Pushy's products have been the product of forced slave labor, genetic manipulation of animals, and the flesh of her husbands.
5	"The Wrath of Klinko"	Kevin Altieri	Kevin Kopelow & Heath Seifert	July 17, 2003
Klinko, a copy store master, uses his copy machines to brainwash customers into criminals and carry out his multiple dirty deeds.
6	"You Only Lick Twice"	Kevin Altieri	Kevin Kopelow & Heath Seifert	July 24, 2003
We're introduced to the evil Queen Clitorus who, from her hidden island hide-out, uses her computer to hold the world hostage as she made various demands, one of which is the sexy Armando. However, it would turn out to be part of her scheme to launch a nuclear winter with her and Armando as the last two people on Earth.
7	"The Bridesmaid"	Mario Piluso	Steve Holland	February 12, 2004
After being the bridesmaid and never the bride 226 times, Molly Lumpkin goes on a citywide rampage. Kidnapping grooms from weddings, Lumpkin plans to choose one to marry and kill the rest with a laser engagement ring. Stripperella must stage a fake wedding and risk her very own "Mr. Right". This is the first episode for which the animation style is altered.
8	"Evil Things Come in Small Packages"	Mario Piluso	Steve Holland	February 19, 2004
Small Fry wants to shrink everything down so he can be big and tall. Stripperella runs to ruin his plans but she gets shrunk. The Chief talks to Stripperella and convinces her that being small doesn't matter. So Stripperella goes and wins. Meanwhile, Cat, fellow stripper, learns about Erotica's secret double life. The problem is, she keeps getting hit in the head and forgetting it...then learning it again...then getting hit in the head again. Finally, Stripperella returns to normal size, but her breasts are much larger than normal size. Stripperella wants her breasts reduced to normal, and by the next scene, they are, if not a little smaller.
9	"Eruption Junction, What's Your Function"	Mario Piluso	Steve Freeman	February 26, 2004
Someone is kidnapping all the smart kids at high school and it's up to Stripperella (disguised as student "Kathy Teria") to stop the kidnapper. This episode also has a brief musical number, performed by several young men chasing Stripperella.
10	"The Evil Magicians"	Mario Piluso	Kevin Kopelow & Heath Seifert	March 4, 2004
Erotica is up for the Stripper of the Year Award in fabulous Las Vegas, but Stripperella has to stop a pair of robbing masked evil magicians. Can Erotica get the award? Will Stripperella foil the crooks in time? And will Kevin ever get his money back?
11	"Cheapo by the Dozen"	Mario Piluso	Kevin Kopelow & Heath Seifert	March 11, 2004
Cheapo's back and ready to steal several bars of copper worth at least $16, with the help of Erotica going under the alias Robin Stuff. Meanwhile, Kevin gets into trouble over a misunderstanding in a casino, lands in jail, and wins a Hawaiian vacation.
12	"The Return of the Queen"	Mario Piluso	Kevin Kopelow & Heath Seifert	March 18, 2004
Queen Clitorus comes again, and this time she wants Stripperella dead! So Clitoris hatches a fiendish plot and lures Stripperella into her lair on a secluded island. Can Stripperella get off the island in time to save her own life?
13	"The Curse of the Werebeaver"	Mario Piluso	Steve Holland	April 1, 2004
An asthmatic motorist runs off the road to avoid hitting an animal and slams into a tree. He is bitten by the animal—a glowing werebeaver—and he turns into a giant glowing werebeaver that runs amok, chewing through anything made of wood and terrorizing the population. Stripperella must stop this rampaging werebeaver without violating her ethics on harming cute furry animals.

== Critical reception ==
Rob Owen of the Pittsburgh Post-Gazette gave the show a positive review, saying that it was "unexpectedly clever, albeit sometimes crude", and that its "tongue in cheek" humor was reminiscent of the 1960s Batman series.

== Home media ==
The Complete DVD boxed set released on February 22, 2005, contains uncensored versions with a new opening theme replacing the original Kid Rock song. Recently, Paramount and Viacom have allowed Mill Creek Entertainment to acquire the distribution rights to any future DVD reissues.

== Comic books ==
Originally there was to have been a promotional Stripperella comic written by Lee and published by Humanoids Publishing (publishers of Métal Hurlant magazine) alongside the animated series, but it was not published.

== Legal controversy ==
In 2003, ex-stripper Janet Clover, a.k.a. "Jazz", a.k.a. "Stripperella", filed a lawsuit in the Daytona Beach, Florida circuit court against Viacom, Stan Lee, and Pamela Anderson, claiming she is Stripperella's true creator and Stan Lee stole her idea when she discussed it during a "private dance session".
