= The K Chronicles =

Autobiographical weekly comic strip by the Keith Knight

- Author(s): Keith Knight
- Website: www.kchronicles.com
- Current status/schedule: Current weekly strip
- Launch date: early 1990s
- Syndicate(s): Self-syndicated
- Publisher(s): Manic D Press; Top Shelf Productions; Dark Horse Comics; Keith Knight Press
- Genre(s): Humor, Satire, Autobiographical

The K Chronicles is an autobiographical weekly comic strip by the independent cartoonist Keith Knight that has been produced since the early 1990s. Knight is an African-American artist whose comics often explore themes relevant to his racial heritage, as well as current events, both personal to Knight and general to the world.

== Publication history ==
Until February 2010 The K Chronicles was updated every Wednesday at Salon.com. The strip previously appeared in the San Francisco Examiner.

== Story and characters ==
Keith "Keef" Knight — The cartoonist and protagonist. The strip centers mainly around his life.

Kerstin Konietzka-Knight — Keith's German-born wife.

George W. Bush — Keith mercilessly lampooned the 43rd President of the United States and his administration. In many strips, Bush is shown as a child, or having the mind of one, as shown by his tiny size and frequent childish giggling.

Dick Cheney — In contrast to Bush, Vice President Cheney appears in the strip as a sort of evil mastermind (for example, after the real-life shooting of Harry Whittington, Cheney appears and after hearing a witness say that what he did was illegal, boasts that he has already done so many illegal things, such as fixing the 2000 election, without being punished, that he is confident that he will escape penalty again). He also makes an appearance in an installment entitled "People Who Can't Be Trusted", where he is placed on the list along with people who put cats on leashes, people who have never seen The Simpsons, and others.

God — Depicted in The K Chronicles as a hamster. In one K Chronicles Collection, "The Passion of the Keef", God appears to deliver the introduction, in which he reveals that The K Chronicles are among his favorite reading material. He also shows up at other times in the strip, such as to visit and hang out with Keith.

Evil Twin — Keith's twin sister.

Gunther — Ex-roommate and drinking buddy.

=== Special features ===
Life's Little Victories — A frequently occurring feature of The K Chronicles in which Knight lists the small victories of everyday life, such as "Running into a movie theater and making sitting down just as the lights are fading", or "Having just enough ingredients to make a fresh bowl of guacamole!" Sometimes the feature has a special theme, such as the "foreign version" which takes place when Keith is visiting his in-laws in Germany, and the "on crutches" version, taking place when Keith was on crutches for two months after tearing his Achilles tendon.

== In other media ==
In November 2018 it was announced that Hulu would be producing a half-hour sitcom, titled Woke, based on The K Chronicles and events from Knight's life. The show will be co-written by Knight; actor Lamorne Morris will be playing Knight.

== Awards ==
In 2007, The K Chronicles won the Harvey Kurtzman Award for Best Syndicated Comic Strip. The other nominees were Antiques: The Comic Strip, Doonesbury, Maakies and Mutts.

The K Chronicles has won "Best Comic Strip" three times in the Glyph Comics Awards, in 2006, 2007 and 2008.

== Collections ==
- Dances with Sheep: A K Chronicles Compendium (1997, Manic D Press). ISBN 0-916397-50-5
- Fear of a Black Marker: Another K Chronicles Compendium (2000, Manic D Press). ISBN 0-916397-63-7
- The 'K' Chronicles: What a Long Strange Strip It's Been (2002, Top Shelf Productions). ISBN 1-891830-30-9
- The Passion of the Keef: The Fourth K Chronicles Compendium (2005, Manic D Press). ISBN 0-916397-67-X
- The Complete K Chronicles — compilation of the first four K Chronicles books (2008, Dark Horse Comics). ISBN 978-1-59307-943-7
- The 5th K Chronicles Compendium: I Left My Arse in San Francisco (2008, Keith Knight Press)
- The K Chronicles: The Incredible Cuteness of Being (2012, Keith Knight Press). ISBN 978-1-4675-3661-5
- Go East, Young Fam!: K Chronicles #7 (2016, Keith Knight Press). ISBN 978-0-9788053-3-3
