= Figure It Out =

American children's panel game show

- Genre: Panel game show
- Created by: Kevin Kay; Magda Liolis
- Presented by: Summer Sanders; Jeff Sutphen
- Narrated by: Jeffery "J" Dumas; Elle Young
- Music by: Roy Harter
- Country of origin: United States
- No. of seasons: 6
- No. of episodes: 233

Production
- Production locations: Nickelodeon Studios, Universal Studios; Orlando, Florida (1997–1999); Paramount Studios; Los Angeles, California (2012–13)
- Running time: 24 minutes
- Production company: Nickelodeon Productions

Original release
- Network: Nickelodeon
- Release: July 7, 1997 – December 12, 1999
- Release: June 11, 2012 – July 16, 2013

Figure It Out is an American children's panel game show that aired on Nickelodeon. The original series, hosted by Summer Sanders, ran for four seasons from July 7, 1997, to December 12, 1999. The show was revived in 2012, with Jeff Sutphen as host, with the revival airing from June 11, 2012, to July 16, 2013. The series was originally recorded at Nickelodeon Studios at Universal Studios in Orlando, Florida. The revival episodes were filmed on stage 19 at Paramount Studios in Los Angeles.

Children with special skills or unique achievements compete as contestants on the show while a panel of four Nickelodeon celebrities try to guess the predetermined phrase that describes the contestant's talent. The series is a loose adaptation of What's My Line? and I've Got a Secret, both established panel shows created by Mark Goodson and Bill Todman.

Shortly after the series aired its last first-run episode, Figure It Out began airing repeats on Nick GAS until the network ceased at the end of 2007 (2009 on Dish Network). Several episodes of the Sanders-hosted series also aired in 2012 as part of The '90s Are All That, a 1990s-oriented rerun block that aired on TeenNick.

== Gameplay ==
Each episode has two sets of three timed rounds (originally all 60 seconds in length, for the revival series, rounds two and three were played for 45 seconds), in which the panel takes turns asking yes-or-no questions to try to guess the contestant's talent. For every "yes" answer, the panelist's turn continues. Once a panelist asks a question with a "no" answer, their turn ends and the next panelist's turn starts. If at any time a panelist cannot think of a question on their turn, they may pass their turn to the next panelist. Each time a panelist mentions a word that is part of the phrase that describes the secret talent, the word is turned over on a game board displaying the puzzle. This game board was referred to as Billy the Answer Head during the original series run and is known simply as the "It" Board in the show's later adaptation.

This game board shows which words of the phrase are guessed, along with blanks denoting words that the panel did not solve. Prepositions and articles, such as "of" and "an," are provided automatically. During the very early episodes of the show, synonyms of words that were on the board were accepted by the judges (e.g.: A panelist revealing the word "song" by saying the word "carol" and another episode featured a panelist revealing the word "tossing" by saying the word "throw"). This was later changed to a panelist having to say the exact word in a contestant's talent in order for that word to be revealed on the board.

The contestant wins a prize after each round that their talent remains unguessed. The prize for winning the third round is a trip. In Season 1, prizes consisted mainly of leftover props from then-defunct Nickelodeon shows such as Double Dare, Legends of the Hidden Temple and Global Guts. Merchandise prizes (such as a Nintendo 64) and gift cards for stores including Kids Foot Locker, Toys "R" Us, and Loew's began to appear as prizes during later seasons. If Round 3 ends with at least one word left unrevealed, each panelist takes one final guess as to what the contestant's talent is (any correct words given during the final guess are revealed, as during the game). The game ends when a panelist either guesses the secret talent or if no panelist guesses the secret talent correctly after the "last guess" stage.

During each Round, the panelists receive one clue as a hint to one of the words of the secret phrase. The clue usually takes the form of physical objects - such as dates to indicate a clue about calendars - sounds (rarely used), the clue-cano (seasons 4-6), featured messy clues erupting out of the clue boxes all over the panel, making them just as messy as a sliming, especially in the Sutphen era which made the panel cautious when opening the clue boxes or pantomime (the "Charade Brigade" (Season 1-4), "Clue Force 3" (Seasons 5-6), usually two or three cast members that act out a word from the phrase during Round 3) with "Clue Force 3" pictionary was sometimes used instead of pantomime. At the start of the second and third rounds, a recap of two or three clues are shown on the monitor next to the contestant and host.

At the end of the game, after the secret talent is revealed, the contestant demonstrates or displays their skill and discusses it with the host and panel.

=== Secret Slime Action ===
In each game, from the start of round 2, a randomly selected member of the studio audience plays for a prize (a merchandise prize, such as a Nintendo 64 or a mountain bike in season 1 or a Figure It Out-branded article of clothing in seasons 2-6). If at least one or more panelists perform the Secret Slime Action, those panelists will be slimed by the end of round 3 especially when one of the panelists tries to break the rules and get a second chance (during season 1, the secret slime action could be triggered anytime after the end of round 1, including between rounds and when the contestant is performing their secret) and the audience member wins that prize. "J", the regular announcer for the original show, would disclose what the Secret Slime Action was for each episode in which he appeared.

The action designated as the Secret Slime Action is typically simple and almost guaranteed: touching a clue, looking to the left, which was reflexive, as clues were commonly wheeled out on a small track from a tunnel to the panel's left; using the phrase "Are you..." or "Is it...", looking to the audience behind the panel, who was sometimes used for clues, saying "I don't know," which panelist Danny Tamberelli was notable for saying out loud whenever he got confused, having a certain name, and even being a panelist. For example, Steve Burns (from Blue's Clues) was slimed because the Secret Slime Action was "having a blue dog," Alex Heartman (from Power Rangers Samurai) was slimed because the Secret Slime Action was "wearing a red unitard to work", Jade Ramsey (from House of Anubis) was slimed because the Secret Slime Action was "having an identical twin sister", Ryan Potter (from Supah Ninjas) was slimed because the Secret Slime Action was "being a supah ninja", and in the second game of the first episode of the 2012 Revival, the entire panel was slimed because the Secret Slime Action was "wearing underwear".

Some Actions are logically not able to be forced, such as "thinking about coconuts" or "thinking about mushroom soup." Especially in the latter seasons, a successful Action has mostly been a foregone conclusion - the variables have only been when it will be triggered, and by whom (not necessarily a panelist).

When the Secret Slime Action is triggered, all play stops (including the clock) while the panelist is slimed, the action is revealed, and a replay of the sliming is shown, after which gameplay resumes. The host knows of the action and sometimes tricks the panelists into performing it by making them say or touch something (in one episode, the action was "touching your head." Sanders touched her head and said, "Have you done something with your hair?," which caused the panel to touch their heads in reaction).

==== Word of Honor ====
In the 2012 revival, prior to each game, one word of either the first or second contestant's secrets may be designated as the "Word of Honor." Should the panel guess this word, the contestant is slimed. As the contestant is slimed, gameplay and the clock are paused. Once the Word of Honor was revealed, either by a panel guess or the contestant filling in unguessed words, it would be out of play for the rest of the show.

== Panelists ==
Either three or all four panelists are taken from Nickelodeon shows airing at the time. Regular panelists during the original run included All That cast members Amanda Bynes, Lori Beth Denberg, Kevin Kopelow and Danny Tamberelli (who also starred in the Nickelodeon program The Adventures of Pete & Pete). Bynes (occasionally), Kopelow and Tamberelli were notorious for frequently asking silly questions and acting goofy, while Denberg was the serious panelist, who asked well-thought out questions, and frequently was the one to guess the secret phrase, during the final guesses. The only four panelists who appeared in every season of the original run of the show were Kopelow, Bynes, Tamberelli, and Irene Ng (from The Mystery Files of Shelby Woo).

The first seat on the panel was usually reserved for an adult panelist, either an adult actor from a Nickelodeon program (usually Kopelow) or a non-Nickelodeon celebrity (such as Taran Noah Smith of Home Improvement). In several episodes, CatDog, rendered in CGI, and Cousin Skeeter, a puppet character, were semi-regular panelists. In Seasons 5 and 6, the first seat was not reserved for an adult, but Matt Bennett from Victorious and Ciara Bravo from Big Time Rush regularly appeared in the first position. Other guest panelists included Coolio, Colin Mochrie (regular on Whose Line Is It Anyway?), and professional wrestlers Chris Jericho, The Giant and "Hacksaw" Jim Duggan.

In one episode of the second season, for the first half, Lori Beth Denberg hosted the show and Summer Sanders was in her place as a panelist.

Name	Seasons					
Name	1 (1997)	2 (1998)	3 (1998)	4 (1999)	5 (2012)	6 (2013)
Danny Tamberelli	Main					
Kevin Kopelow	Main					
Amanda Bynes	Main					
Lori Beth Denberg	Main					
Ciara Bravo					Main	
Matt Bennett					Main	

== Production ==
Production on the original version of Figure It Out started on March 24, 1997, and ended a month later, at Nickelodeon Studios in Orlando, Florida, with a planned 40-episode order.

In 2013, Sutphen confirmed via Twitter that no new episodes of the revival of Figure It Out would be produced.

== Format changes ==
1997–1999 logo.

- Season 3 (fall 1998) — The series became Figure It Out: Family Style, featuring two or three contestants who were related, typically parent-child or siblings. Sometimes on the 2nd half, the panel can have a family member of the contestant. Sometimes, the Charade Brigade can have family members of the panelists and the host. Figure It Out: Family Style also features Little Billy. If the panelists figured out the contestants' secret, then Little Billy (a miniature version of Billy the Answer Head with hair and on wheels) would come out. Summer reads a question about the family's talent and then each panelist will try to guess one (impossible) answer. If they cannot figure it out (no panel ever did since they simply treated it as a free-for-all most times by guessing answers intended for comedic response), then the answer in Little Billy would reveal and which gives the family another chance to win a prize (usually the Figure It Out apparel used for the Secret Slime Action Rounds). For certain episodes, J's mother, Joanne Dumas filled in as the show's announcer.
- Season 4 (fall 1999) — The show was re-titled Figure It Out: Wild Style and focused solely on talents involving animals; in addition, Billy the Answer Head was reshaped into various animals. During these episodes, the panelists went wild with hair, wigs and make-up, sporting a different, distinctive look. Sometimes, instead of J himself doing the narration work, some episodes would instead be narrated by J's dog (voiced by J). This is the only original Figure It Out season that does not include Lori Beth Denberg, as she had moved on to work on The Steve Harvey Show. During these episodes, seven different panelists such as Steve Burns, Shane Sweet, Erin J. Dean, Christy Knowings, Irene Ng, Kevin Kopelow and Kareem Blackwell permanently replaced Denberg in the chair she always sat in. This season also featured recurring panelist appearances from legendary animal expert and TV personality, "Jungle" Jack Hanna, who would be holding an animal in the first half, before having the animal taken backstage so he had a chance to be slimed with the rest of the panelists.
- Season 5 (summer 2012) — The show reverted to its original title and Jeff Sutphen took over as host. Elle Young took over as the announcer. The set, host, panelists, theme music and logo were all modified to serve Nickelodeon's contemporary audience. Gameplay was also slightly modified to include the Word of Honor component and to shorten the lengths of rounds two and three (originally, all rounds were 60 seconds; in the newer version, rounds two and three are 45 seconds). Also, Billy the Answer Head was changed to the "It Board," the Clue Express was renamed the "Clue Coaster" and the Charade Brigade was changed to "Clue Force III" featuring Lorenz Arnell, Gevorg Manoukian and Julia Srednicki.
- Season 6 (fall 2012 and summer 2013) — The show was brought back after the long gap in the summer. The style of the show stays the same, but with some changes, such as a fifth seat and slime spewer added to the panel desk for the child panelist who won a summer contest to appear for one entire episode (the fifth panel desk was gone before and after the winning child's episode).

== Famous contestants ==
On April 7, 1998, future country music singer/songwriter Hunter Hayes was a contestant on Figure It Out when he was six years old. His talent was playing the accordion and singing.

Sam Roberts, Podcaster, WWE Personality, and host of Jim Norton & Sam Roberts on SiriusXM, appeared on an episode in Season 2. His talent was flipping quarters off his ankle.

Marcus Stroman of the New York Yankees was a prize winner in episode 13 of Season 1.

Gentry Haukebo, Albuquerque rap artist better known as 1oK, was a contestant and prize winner in an episode during the show's fifth season. Her talent was being a shovel racing champion.

Julia Srednicki, character designer for OK K.O.! Let's Be Heroes, was a member of the "Clue Force 3" during the final two seasons hosted by Jeff Sutphen.
