= FUBAR (TV series) =

American action-comedy television series

- Genre: Action comedy; Comedy-drama
- Created by: Nick Santora
- Starring: Arnold Schwarzenegger; Monica Barbaro; Milan Carter; Gabriel Luna; Fortune Feimster; Travis Van Winkle; Fabiana Udenio; Jay Baruchel; Barbara Eve Harris; Aparna Brielle; Andy Buckley; Guy Burnet; Carrie-Anne Moss
- Music by: Tony Morales
- Country of origin: United States
- Original language: English
- No. of seasons: 2
- No. of episodes: 16

Production
- Executive producers: Nick Santora; David Ellison; Dana Goldberg; Bill Bost; Adam Higgs; Scott Sullivan; Holly Dale; Phil Abraham; Arnold Schwarzenegger; Matt Thunell; Amy Pocha; Seth Cohen
- Producer: Agatha Barnes
- Cinematography: Craig Wrobleski; Colin Hoult; Michael McMurray; Jimmy Lindsey
- Editors: J.J. Geiger; Eric Seaburn; Anthony Miller; Sang Han; Christopher Petrus; Ryan J. Knight
- Running time: 42–59 minutes
- Production companies: Blackjack Films; Skydance Television

Original release
- Network: Netflix
- Release: May 25, 2023 – June 12, 2025

FUBAR is an American action comedy television series created by Nick Santora for Netflix. It stars Arnold Schwarzenegger in his first leading role in a scripted live-action television series, and it is produced by Skydance Television and Blackjack Films. The series premiered on May 25, 2023. In June 2023, the series was renewed for a second season, which premiered on June 12, 2025. In August 2025, the series was canceled after two seasons.

== Premise ==
Luke Brunner and his daughter Emma have lied to each other for years, with neither of them knowing that the other is a CIA operative. Once they both learn the truth, they realize that they do not actually know anything about each other. They are required by their superiors to work together on dangerous operations, leading to challenges when Luke treats Emma as a child and when he becomes overly concerned for her safety and relationship conflicts.

== Cast ==
=== Main ===
- Arnold Schwarzenegger as Luke Brunner
- Monica Barbaro as Emma Brunner
- Milan Carter as Barry, the CIA technical operations officer of Luke's team
- Gabriel Luna as Boro Polonia (season 1), a powerful arms dealer
- Fortune Feimster as Roo, a CIA operative on Luke's team
- Travis Van Winkle as Aldon, a CIA operative on Luke's team
- Fabiana Udenio as Tally Brunner, Luke's ex-wife and Emma's mother
- Jay Baruchel as Carter, Emma's boyfriend who is a kindergarten teacher
- Barbara Eve Harris as Dot (season 1; guest season 2), a regional CIA director who tasked Luke and Emma to work together as a team
- Aparna Brielle as Tina, the NSA data analyst brought in to support Luke's team
- Andy Buckley as Donnie, Tally's boyfriend
- Guy Burnet as Theodore "Theo" Chips (season 2), a former MI6 agent who works with Greta and is interested in Emma romantically
- Carrie-Anne Moss as Greta Nelso (season 2), a former East German spy who had a romantic past with Luke

=== Recurring ===
- Devon Bostick as Oscar, Luke and Tally's son and Emma's brother
- David Chinchilla as Cain Khan (season 1), Boro's right-hand man
- Stephanie Sy as Sandy, Oscar's wife
- Scott Thompson as Dr. Pfeffer, the operational psychologist that Dot brought in to conduct Luke and Emma's mandatory joint therapy sessions
- Adam Pally as The Great Dane
- Enrico Colantoni as Reed (season 2), the interim regional CIA director replacing Dot

=== Notable guest stars ===
- Tom Arnold as Norm Carlson, a CIA torturer
- Kevin McDonald as Todd Demps, an activist scientist
- Old 97's, performing one of their own songs, portrays the house band in Tallinn when Emma and Chips dance

== Episodes ==
=== Series overview ===
| Season | Episodes | Originally released |
|---|---|---|
| 1 | 8 | May 25, 2023 |
| 2 | 8 | June 12, 2025 |

=== Season 1 (2023) ===
| No. overall | No. in season | Title | Directed by | Written by | Original release date |
|---|---|---|---|---|---|
| 1 | 1 | "Take Your Daughter to Work Day" | Phil Abraham | Nick Santora | May 25, 2023 |
Luke Brunner, a CIA officer, successfully completes his last mission, and can now retire. Luke returns home to Armonk, New York, hoping to rekindle a full relationship with his divorced wife, Tally, and daughter Emma, who are unaware of Luke's true occupation. During his retirement party, Luke's friend and fellow CIA operative, Barry, reveals that a secret CIA operative codenamed Panda is in danger in Guyana, monitoring arms dealer Boro Polonia. Luke secretly killed Boro's father years ago, and has become "Uncle Finn" to him. Luke goes to Guyana to help Panda with the mission – and is shocked to find that Emma is Panda. Luke and Emma eliminate Troy, an associate of Boro, to protect Panda's identity. Boro's henchmen find the bodies, leading to suspicions. Luke and Emma hide in the jungle and encounter a British family seeking escape, but they are ultimately cornered by Boro's men and held at gunpoint.
| 2 | 2 | "Stole Train" | Holly Dale | Scott Sullivan | May 25, 2023 |
Emma and Luke manage to shoot their way out of trouble with a little help. Their boss forces them to work together to track down Boro. They discover Boro will try to hijack nuclear waste from a high-speed maglev train in Kazakhstan and are successful in stopping the theft but overspeed the train risking a crash at the terminal.
| 3 | 3 | "Honeyplot" | Holly Dale | Adam Higgs | May 25, 2023 |
Emma and Luke manage to slow the train by working together. Boro becomes obsessed in finding Emma and Luke. He is also trying to make a weapon out of the small amount of radioactive waste that he was able to obtain. The team all work together to obtain a secure scientific paper that explains exactly how to do that
| 4 | 4 | "Armed & Dane-gerous" | Steven A. Adelson | Penny Cox | May 25, 2023 |
Carter proposes to Emma and she accepts. Emma and Luke continue to go to counseling, as ordered, even engaging in other person role-playing. The team has to extract the "Great Dane" from a Turkish prison as he is essential to their plan.
| 5 | 5 | "Here Today, Gone To-Marrow" | Steven A. Adelson | Cait Duffy | May 25, 2023 |
The team captures Boro while exchanging the miniature nuclear reactor (MNR). As Luke's granddaughter and Emma's niece, Romi, needs a bone marrow transplant, the team forces Romi's biological father to be the donor. Boro masterminds his own escape and recovery of the MNR.
| 6 | 6 | "Royally Flushed" | Phil Abraham | Scott Sullivan & Lillian Wang | May 25, 2023 |
Barry and Tina get into a high stakes poker game to get data from Cain's phone. The rest of the team get trapped in a vault in the excluded poker players' old home. Luke and Tally renew their relationship.
| 7 | 7 | "Urine Luck" | Stephen Surjik | Adam Higgs & Michael J. Gutierrez | May 25, 2023 |
Barry and Tina start to date. Carter calls off the engagement after learning Emma had kissed Aldon, and as she complains to Luke about him having revealed that and ruining her relationship, he in turn calls Tally saying they are better off separated, leading Tally to ask boyfriend Donnie to marry her. While the team intercepts Boro in an abandoned nuclear plant to prevent him from developing dirty bombs with the nuclear material, Aldon is shot, forcing Roo to take care of him as Emma and Luke go after Boro. After deactivating the material and preventing an accidental explosion, the Brunners leave Boro behind in the plant.
| 8 | 8 | "That's It And That's All" | Stephen Surjik | Nick Santora | May 25, 2023 |
Learning Tina is about to be recalled by the NSA, Barry asks many favors around the agency to keep her around. On the day of Tally and Donnie's wedding, Emma tells Luke to be honest with her mother. He reveals his life as a CIA agent, giving her his National Intelligence Distinguished Service Medal, and asks if she wants to call off the wedding and run away with him. The ceremony is then invaded by Boro, who after being rescued by his men used all the data he accrued on the Brunners to discover their location, and proceeds to render Tally hostage while asking Luke and Emma to shoot each other dead. Once Tally stabs Boro with Luke's medal, she breaks from his grip, and Luke and Emma kill him. As the Brunners are told their identities have been leaked by a mole, they gather the group and run away alongside Tally, Donnie, and Carter, knowing many former enemies will be out to get them.

=== Season 2 (2025) ===
| No. overall | No. in season | Title | Directed by | Written by | Original release date |
|---|---|---|---|---|---|
| 9 | 1 | "Fullest House" | Phil Abraham | Nick Santora | June 12, 2025 |
Luke's team and Luke's family is under witness protection until the CIA confirms that no one is coming after the team. Luke meets Dot and Dot explains about a terrorist known by the name, Dante Cress. Dot gives Luke a cryptex to decode Dante's encrypted messages. Group of armed men attack Dot and Luke. Emma, Aldon and Roo save Luke but Dot is killed. Volek asks Tina to gather information. Barry decrypts Dante's encrypted message which states that Dante gave money to Theodore Chips to destroy an entire power grid. The team arrives at the power grid and stops the EMP attack by Chips. CIA finds that the EMP was made by Bashir from Kolkata, India and Chips is in Prague. Tina gives information to Barry about the CIA's accountant, Farkas who might be working for Dante. In Prague, Luke and Emma meet Greta while looking for Chips.
| 10 | 2 | "Highly Re-Greta-Ble" | Phil Abraham | Adam Higgs | June 12, 2025 |
Greta was Luke's ex girlfriend and Greta was believed to have died in a car crash. Greta is working for Dante Cress. Greta and Theodore Chips escape. Tina and Aldon find Bashir but Bashir is shot dead during an attack by armed men. The team looks for Todd Demps and Tina looks into Dante's frozen accounts. The team finds Demps hideout but armed men led by Chips attack. The team kills the armed men and captures Chips but Demps dies.
| 11 | 3 | "Tango and Smash" | Phil Abraham | Scott Sullivan | June 12, 2025 |
Greta kidnaps Luke. Tina continues to give information to Volek. Based on Tina's findings on Dante Cress's frozen accounts, Farkas is arrested for money laundering. Emma agrees to go on a date with Theodore Chips in exchange for the location of Greta's safehouse in Tallinn. Armed men attack Greta's safehouse. Luke and Greta kill the armed men but Greta escapes.
| 12 | 4 | "Astro-Not" | Jeff T. Thomas | Seth Cohen & Amy Pocha | June 12, 2025 |
The team understands that Greta used truth serum on Luke to extract information. Dante Cress kills Felipe for Greta's failures. Theodore Chips gives information on Greta's next possible target in exchange for safety. Farkas testifies that the stolen funds from criminal accounts were actually brought back into CIA's funds and Farkas is released. Luke and Tally argue. The team finds out about Greta's next target which involves crashing a military satellite into a powergrid. The team steals a military drone to stop the satellite crash.
| 13 | 5 | "Trippin' the Abyss" | Jeff T. Thomas | Penny Cox | June 12, 2025 |
The team prevents the satellite crash with additional help from Tina but Greta disguised as a military officer destroys the power grid. With Farkas's help, the team understands that Tina is a double agent. Barry leaves the safehouse to meet Tina. Emma captures Tina. Barry is interrogated due to Barry's relationship with Tina. Emma and Luke visit Dane and finds out about Greta's next target. Tally leaves the safehouse to celebrate Romi's birthday in a pizza place. Aldon, Theodore Chips and Carter leave the safehouse to find Tally.
| 14 | 6 | "Penny Possum's Pizzapocalypse" | Jeff T. Thomas | Cait Duffy | June 12, 2025 |
Armed men from Swedish Mafia attack Penny Possums Pizza place. Aldon and Theodore Chips kill the armed men. Greta outsmarts the team and another powergrid is shut down. Dane is kidnapped by unknown men. Greta surrounds the safehouse with armed men. Luke reveals the location of the safehouse to the Swedish Mafia. Greta's men and Swedish Mafia fight while Luke's team and Luke's family escape from the safehouse. The team captures one of Greta's men, Dieter. Luke and Emma interrogate Dieter and find out about Greta's next target. Emma and Roo arrive at a DARPA facility in Ulysses, Kansas to find out which weapon Greta stole. Carter and Donnie are captured by drug dealers while searching for Hamsteak. Luke and Chips kill Greta's men at another powergrid.
| 15 | 7 | "Dam It" | MJ Bassett | Lillian Wang & Michael J. Gutierrez | June 12, 2025 |
The team tries to prevent the powergrid from shutting down. Carter and Donnie escape from the drug dealers. Armed men ambush Aldon while meeting an informant named Nonna. Carter and Donnie resist arrest by a police officer and steal a police car. Aldon kills the armed men. Donnie accidentally shots himself and Carter takes Donnie to a hospital. Aldon pretends to be dead to save Nonna from Dante Cress. Luke devises a plan to locate Dante. Luke's plan works and Farkas and Barry locate Dante.
| 16 | 8 | "Let's Twist Again" | Phil Abraham | Adam Higgs & Scott Sullivan | June 12, 2025 |
The team realizes that Dante Cress' true target is not the national power grid; he wants an apocalyptic nuclear war to wipe out most of the human population. With Tina's help, Barry confirms the location of Volek's hideout. Volek reveals that he is not Dante Cress. Barry kills Volek with a self-driving car, allowing Aldon to unjam communications with Russia. Luke uses a backdoor password at a silo to stop the nuclear strike. Theodore Chips reveals himself as the real Dante Cress, and, rather than let him kill his enlisted airman hostage while they save billions of people, Luke's team surrenders their weapons – and Chips still shoots an airman. Chips launches a nuclear missile manually. Luke and Greta manage to disarm the warhead. Russia threatens nuclear war if the missile leaves US airspace. Greta seemingly sacrifices herself to sabotage the booster rocket. Chips is incinerated during the missile launch. In the aftermath, Luke and Emma reconcile and allow Greta – who survived – to escape; as thanks, Greta hires hitmen to kill everyone who purchased the team's private information from Boro. Series denouement: Luke and Tally's breakup turns out to have been a deception and they get engaged. Luke retires while Emma turns down a position with the CIA's elite Unit 9, to stay with the team. Roo becomes the CIA regional director. Donnie and Carter are forced to go into witness protection for four years after a million dollar bounty is put on their heads for killing one of the drug dealers. Emma and Aldon admit to each other that they want to date. The Great Dane is revealed to have been kidnapped by Russians; Aldon and Barry swap Tina for the Dane. The season (and cancelled series) ends on a cliffhanger when the Dane reveals that Tina had been feeding Russia false information all along, putting her life in danger; the team intends to go to Russia without executive permission.

== Production ==
Skydance Television first announced that it was developing an untitled spy television series for Arnold Schwarzenegger to star in and make his scripted live-action television debut in August 2020. Shortly afterward, Monica Barbaro was cast as the lead opposite Schwarzenegger in the series where a father and daughter are both CIA officers, unbeknownst to the other. Netflix won the rights for the project that November and had ordered eight episodes of the series by May 2021. The cast was expanded in April 2022, announcing several regular and recurring roles. Phil Abraham was announced as director and executive producer of the pilot episode in May, and a July casting announcement added Adam Pally. While in production, the series used the working titles Utap and FUBAR.

Filming for the first season began in April 2022 in Antwerp, Belgium around Grote Markt. Additional filming took place in Toronto, where Schwarzenegger was seen re-teaming with former True Lies co-star Tom Arnold. In September 2022, filming wrapped up with the series now titled FUBAR.

On June 17, 2023, Netflix renewed the series for a second season. On May 13, 2024, Carrie-Anne Moss was cast to star opposite of Schwarzenegger for the second season. Filming for the second season began on April 29, 2024, and concluded on August 30, 2024, in Toronto. On August 1, 2025, Netflix canceled the series after two seasons due to a steep decline in viewership for the second season.

== Release ==
FUBAR was released to stream on Netflix on May 25, 2023. The second season was released on June 12, 2025.

== Reception ==
For the first season, the review aggregator website Rotten Tomatoes reported a 51% approval rating with an average rating of 5.4/10, based on 57 critic reviews. The website's critics consensus reads, "With jokes that fall flat and a story that borrows liberally from star Arnold Schwarzenegger's earlier career triumphs, FUBAR is just OK." Metacritic, which uses a weighted average, assigned a score of 48 out of 100 based on 25 critics, indicating "mixed or average". The series was the overall most streamed television series for the week of its release, May 22–28, 2023, according to the Nielsen streaming rankings.

The second season has a 46% approval rating on Rotten Tomatoes based on 13 critic reviews. The website's critics consensus states, "FUBAR doesn't mess with its formula beyond recognition in a second season that's not without its charms but still hampered by clunky scripting." On Metacritic, it has a weighted average score of 59 out of 100 based on 6 critics, indicating "mixed or average".
