= Maurice Marable =

American director and producer

- Other name: Mo Marable
- Occupations: Director, producer
- Years active: 1994–present
- Awards: Black Reel Award for Outstanding Directing, Comedy Series for Woke (2021)

Maurice "Mo" Marable is an American director and producer. He was the executive producer for the Hulu comedy Woke, and has directed episodes of Killing It, Grand Crew, It’s Always Sunny in Philadelphia, Veep, Last Week Tonight with John Oliver, and seasons two through four of Brockmire.

== Career ==
Marable started his work in entertainment as an undergraduate at Georgia State University's film school, when he took an internship for Spike Lee's in-production film Drop Squad. He dropped out of school and began working as a production supervisor on music videos for artists including Michael Jackson. Prior to film school he served in the Air Force for three years.

Marable next worked as a freelance production manager for HBO, and after about two years he began directing television promos for the network. He was eventually promoted to creative director. His directing work includes the title sequence for Big Love and the season four promo for Six Feet Under. Next, he went to BET Studios and worked as the vice president of creative services. He was the creative director for the BET Awards in 2010, 2011, and 2012. He also directed the promo for Being Mary Jane. In 2012 Marable co-founded the creative studio Brim + Brew with Gary Romano.

He gained wider prominence in 2014 for directing a short film starring Julia Louis-Dreyfus and then-vice president Joe Biden for the White House Correspondents Dinner. Marable went on to direct for Insecure, Anthony Bourdain: Parts Unknown, Preachers of L.A., Being Mary Jane, Lodge 49, The Last O.G., and The Newsroom. He directed three seasons of Brockmire. He signed with the talent agency UTA in 2020, the same year as the premiere of Hulu series Woke starring Lamorne Morris, which Marable executive produced. He also directed the pilot episode of Killing It on Peacock.

In 2021 it was announced that Marable will direct the upcoming Disney+ remake of Three Men and a Baby starring Zac Efron. In 2023 Marable was announced as the director of upcoming sci-fi feature film The Fall for Amblin Entertainment.

== Personal life ==
Marable resides in Atlanta with his wife and children.

== Accolades ==
- 2006 – Nominee, Primetime Emmy Award for Outstanding Main Title Design (for Big Love)
- 2021 – Winner, Black Reel Award for Outstanding Directing, Comedy Series (for Woke)
