= Keith Knight (cartoonist) =

American cartoonist and musician (born 1966)

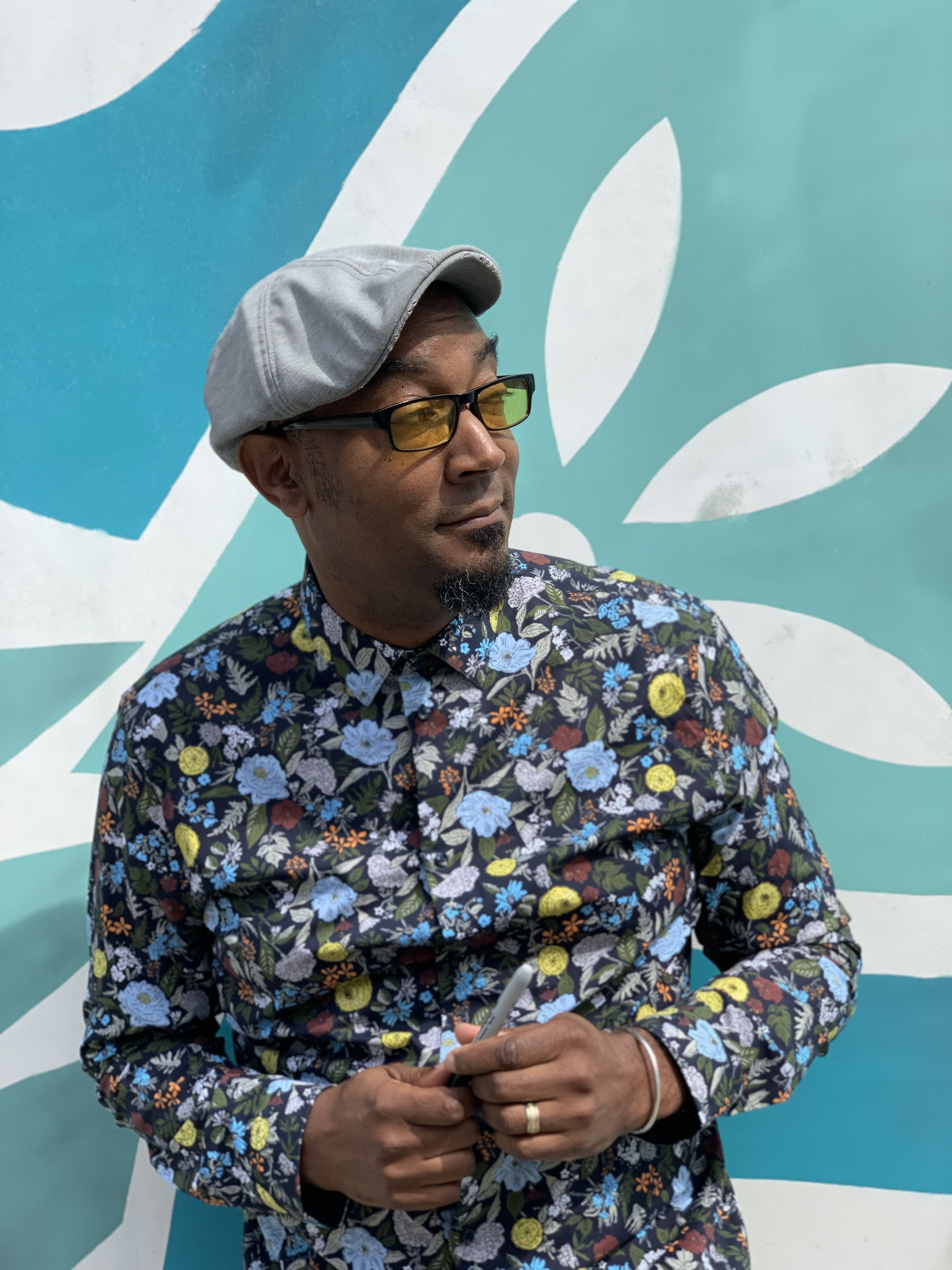
- Knight in 2019
- Born: Keith Edgar Knight Jr. August 24, 1966 (age 60) Malden, Massachusetts, U.S.
- Area: Cartoonist
- Pseudonyms: K-Squared; Keef
- Notable works: The K Chronicles (Th)ink; The Knight Life; Woke
- Awards: Glyph Comics Awards (2006, 2007, 2008, 2010, 2011); Harvey Award (2007); Inkpot Award (2010)
- Spouse: Kerstin Konietzka-Knight

Keith Edgar Knight Jr. (born August 24, 1966) is an American cartoonist and musician known for his accessible yet subversive satirical comic strips The K Chronicles, (Th)ink, and The Knight Life. While his work is humorous and universal in appeal, he also often deals with political, social, and racial issues. Woke, a television series based on his work, debuted in 2020.

== Biography and personal life ==
Knight was born in Malden, Massachusetts, and raised in the Boston area. Previously a resident of San Francisco, in 2007 he moved to Los Angeles. He is now based in the Research Triangle area of North Carolina.

He is married to German-born illustrator Kerstin Konietzka-Knight, and they have two children; they appear as characters in The K Chronicles and The Knight Life. (The timeline of The Knight Life is about two years behind The K Chronicles.) Knight often pokes gentle fun at his wife's mangling of English idioms. Their first son is not referred to by name, but is sometimes referred to as "The Unbearable Cuteness of Being."

== Career ==
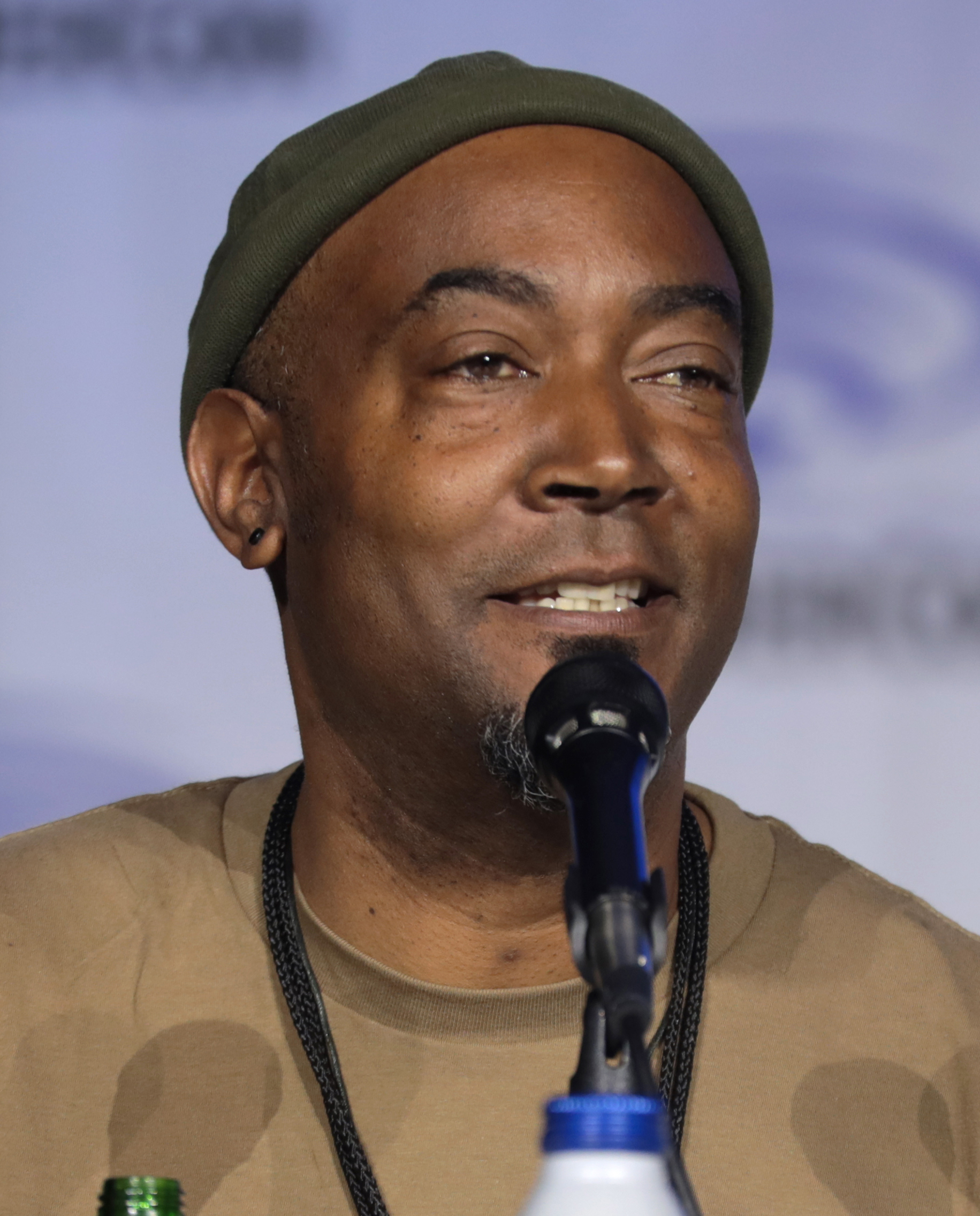
Knight at the 2022 WonderCon to promote Woke

Knight's regular feature The K Chronicles, launched in the early 1990s, appears in various outlets, including Daily Kos, and previously appeared in the San Francisco Examiner, while (th)ink is published on several newspapers and websites, especially African-American sites. A syndicated daily strip, The Knight Life, was launched in 2008. Knight is also the artist for two strips appearing in Mad: Father O'Flannity's Hot Tub Confessions and Bully Baby.

In the March 14, 2012, strip of The K Chronicles, Knight announced he was working on a graphic novel about his brief (1984–1985) career as a professional Michael Jackson impersonator. The book will be entitled I Was a Teenage Michael Jackson Impersonator. The book is scheduled to premiere at San Diego Comic-Con in July 2023.

Knight also appeared in The Marginal Prophets, a hip-hop band.

Knight has become a public speaker, with comic strip slideshows addressing racial illiteracy, police brutality and the role it has played since the early years of the United States.

In November 2018 it was announced that Hulu would be producing a half-hour sitcom, titled Woke, based on The K Chronicles and events from Knight's life. The show is co-written by Knight; actor Lamorne Morris plays Knight. Woke debuted on September 9, 2020. On November 17, 2020, Hulu renewed the series for a second season.

== Awards ==
In 2007, The K Chronicles won the Harvey Kurtzman Award for Best Syndicated Comic Strip. The other nominees were Antiques: The Comic Strip, Doonesbury, Maakies, and Mutts.

The K Chronicles has won the Glyph Awards Best Comic Strip multiple times, including 2006, 2007, 2009, and 2010.

In 2010, Knight was presented with an Inkpot Award for career achievement at San Diego Comic-Con.

In 2015, Knight was recognized by the NAACP as a History Maker, saying Knight's "ability to inspire conversation and action through his comic strips is a testament to the power art can have on a movement, and a shining example for all those looking for their unique way to make change in the world."

- 2015 Belle Foundation grant recipient

== Bibliography ==
- Dances with Sheep (1997, Manic D Press). ISBN 0-916397-50-5
- Fear of a Black Marker (2000, Manic D Press). ISBN 0-916397-63-7
- What a Long Strange Strip It's Been (2002, Top Shelf Productions). ISBN 1-891830-30-9
- Red, White, Black & Blue: a (th)ink anthology (2004, Manic D Press). ISBN 0-916397-88-2
- — (10 February 2005). The Passion of the Keef: The Fourth K Chronicles Compendium. Foreword by Aaron McGruder (First ed.). Manic D Press, Inc. ISBN 978-0916397678. OCLC 861830439. OL 8337655M.
- Are We Feeling Safer Yet? A (th)ink Anthology (2007, Top Shelf Productions). ISBN 978-0-9788053-0-2
- The Complete K Chronicles, a compilation of the first four K Chronicles books (2008, Dark Horse Comics). ISBN 978-1-59307-943-7
- Beginner's Guide to Community-Based Arts (2005, New Village Press). ISBN 978-0-9766054-3-0
- I Left my Arse in San Francisco (2008, Keith Knight Press)
- Too Small To Fail: A (th)ink Anthology (2009, Keith Knight Press)
- The Knight Life: "Chivalry Ain't Dead" (2010, Grand Central Publishing). ISBN 978-0-446-54866-3
- The Incredible Cuteness of Being (2012, Keith Knight Press). ISBN 978-1-4675-3661-5
- 25 Steps to a Better Kickstarter Campaign (2013, Keith Knight Press)
- Knight Takes Queen: The 2nd Knight Life Collection (2015, Keith Knight Press). ISBN 978-0-990-52080-1
- They Shoot Black People, Don't They? (2015, Keith Knight Press)
- Go East, Young Fam! (2016, Keith Knight Press). ISBN 978-0-9788053-3-3
- Make America Hate Again: A (th)ink Anthology (2016, Keith Knight Press)
- Jake the Fake Keeps It Real (2017 Crown Books)
- Tribespotting: Undercover Cult(ure) Stories, by Harmon Leon, cartoonist, (2019, 39 West Press). ISBN 978-1-946358-19-6
- I Was a Teenage Michael Jackson Impersonator (2023, Keith Knight Press) ISBN 978-0-978805-36-4

== Discography (with Marginal Prophets) ==
- Twist the Nob (1997)
- dead hippie bootleg : the Marginal Prophets live!! (2002)
- Bohemian Rap CD (2004)

== Filmography ==
- Revengeance, voice actor (2017)
- Drawn Together, featured subject (2017)
- Woke, co-creator (2020–2021)
