= Milan Carter =

American actor (born 1987)

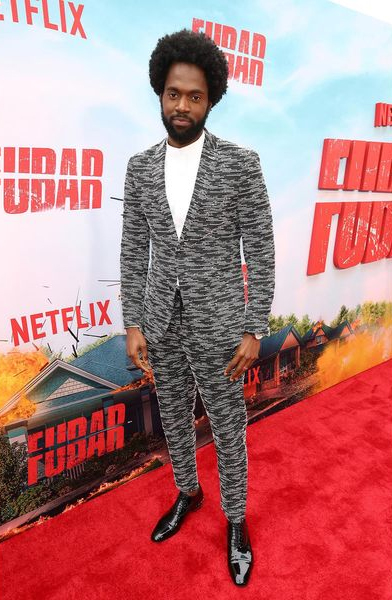
- Born: September 29, 1987 (age 38); West Philadelphia, Pennsylvania, U.S.
- Education: Overbrook High School
- Alma mater: Lincoln University
- Occupation: Actor
- Years active: 2017–present

Milan Carter (born September 29, 1987) is an American actor. Starting with minor roles in film and on television in 2017, he came to attention as a part of the main cast of the series Netflix series FUBAR, which aired from 2023 to 2025.

== Early life ==
Carter was born on September 29, 1987, in West Philadelphia, Philadelphia. He grew up in Lancaster Ave Philadelphia, where he graduated from Overbook High School in 2005. He has a bachelor's degree in Mass Communication from Lincoln University. In November 2019 he married his girlfriend Ashley Carter.

== Career ==
After started in show business working behind the camera for Entertainment Tonight, HipHollywood, and Kevin Frazier. He started onscreen by hostingshows like TRL and Movies with Milan for Vibe Magazine.

In 2017 he started working on his acting career, with guest roles in episodes of Runaways, and The Neighborhood. His first film role was in the 2019 film Dolemite Is My Name. In 2020, he was cast in Wilde Things, an unaired pilot for a sitcom that had been under consideration at CBS. His first major television role was portraying the character of Wilson, the owner of the eponymous comic book store in the short-lived series Warped! (2022).

Since 2023, Carter has appeared in his breakthrough role as Barry, the CIA coworker and close friend of the character played by Arnold Schwarzenegger.

== Filmography ==
=== Television ===
| Year | Title | Role | Ref |
|---|---|---|---|
| 2017 | Marvel's Runaways | Worker 1 | 1 episode |
| 2018 | The Neighborhood | Wyatt | 1 episode |
| 2019 | Dolemite Is My Name | Larry Munn | |
| 2020 | Warped! | Wislon | Recurring role |
| 2023-2025 | FUBAR | Barry | Main cast |
| 2026 | Ted Lasso | Charles | 1 episode |
