= Cousins for Life =

American comedy television series

- Genre: Comedy
- Created by: Kevin Kopelow & Heath Seifert
- Starring: Scarlet Spencer; Dallas Dupree Young; Micah Abbey; Ron G; Ishmel Sahid
- Theme music composer: Rick Butler & Fred Rapoport
- Composers: Rick Butler & Fred Rapoport
- Country of origin: United States
- Original language: English
- No. of seasons: 1
- No. of episodes: 20

Production
- Executive producers: Kevin Kopelow & Heath Seifert; Jeny Quine
- Producers: Vincent Brown; Wayne Conley; Craig Wyrick-Solari
- Cinematography: Bryan Hays; Joseph W. Calloway
- Camera setup: Multi-camera
- Running time: 22 minutes
- Production companies: Kevin & Heath Productions; Nickelodeon Productions

Original release
- Network: Nickelodeon
- Release: November 24, 2018 – June 8, 2019

Cousins for Life is an American comedy television series created by Kevin Kopelow and Heath Seifert that aired on Nickelodeon from November 24, 2018 to June 8, 2019. The series stars Scarlet Spencer, Dallas Dupree Young, Micah Abbey, Ron G, and Ishmel Sahid.

== Premise ==
When his wife is deployed on a mission across the sea, Clark takes his son Stuart where they move to Portland to live with Clark's uptight brother Lewis and his children Ivy and Leaf. Since moving in together, Stuart and Ivy partake in different activities together while having different misadventures along the way.

== Cast ==
=== Main ===
- Scarlet Spencer as Ivy
- Dallas Dupree Young as Stuart
- Micah Abbey as Leaf
- Ron G as Lewis
- Ishmel Sahid as Clark

=== Recurring ===
- Jolie Hoang-Rappaport as Gemma

=== Notable guest stars ===
- Lizzy Greene as Natalie
- Roman Reigns as Rodney
- Annie LeBlanc as herself
- Savannah May as Marigold
- Daniella Monet as Denise

== Production ==
The series was green-lit with a 20-episode order on March 8, 2018, and premiered in November 2018. Production began in Los Angeles in summer 2018. Kevin Kopelow and Heath Seifert serve as executive producers. On October 29, 2018, it was announced that a sneak peek of the series would air on November 24, 2018. New episodes of the series resumed on January 5, 2019.

== Episodes ==
No.	Title	Directed by	Written by	Original release date	Prod. code	U.S. viewers (millions)
1	"Movin' In"	Jonathan Judge	Heath Seifert & Kevin Kopelow	November 24, 2018	101	0.62
Guest star: Emma Shannon
2	"Space Invader"	Jonathan Judge	Heath Seifert & Kevin Kopelow	January 5, 2019	102	0.68
Guest star: Jolie Hoang-Rappaport
3	"Scammer Time"	Katy Garretson	Rachel McNevin	January 12, 2019	104	0.86
Special guest star: Lizzy Greene Guest star: Jolie Hoang-Rappaport
4	"Hot Dog Day Afternoon"	Katy Garretson	Jim Hope & Loni Steele Sosthand	January 19, 2019	105	0.69
Guest stars: Stephanie Lemelin, Tyler Chase, Jasmine T.R. Gatewood
5	"This Little Piggy Went to Market"	Eric Dean Seaton	Wayne Conley	January 26, 2019	108	0.85
Guest star: Cate Scott Campbell
6	"The Fearsome Foursome"	Robbie Countryman	Jeny Quine	February 2, 2019	112	1.12
Guest stars: Jolie Hoang-Rappaport, Tait Blum
7	"Super Ivy"	Jody Margolin Hahn	Rachel McNevin	February 16, 2019	111	0.83
Guest stars: Preston Jones, Carsyn Rose
8	"Art-Thur"	Trevor Kirschner	Heath Seifert & Kevin Kopelow	February 23, 2019	113	0.80
Guest stars: Kendall Rae, Emma Shannon, Jolie Hoang-Rappaport, Tait Blum
9	"A Farewell to Arthur?"	Brian Stepanek	Shawnté McCall	March 2, 2019	115	0.77
Special guest star: Roman Reigns Guest star: Emma Shannon
10	"Clothes Call"	Robbie Countryman	Vincent Brown	March 9, 2019	106	0.85
Ivy and Stuart create biodegradable clothes using food around the house, though they both do so for different reasons. Ivy wants to support the environment and have Lady Elle recognize her work, while Stuart wants to use it to become rich and famous. However, in all of the excitement, Stuart reveals that he promised Lady Elle that he and Ivy would have all the clothes done in a day, which leads to bugs not being worked out. When Lady Elle stops by to evaluate the clothes, they begin falling apart due to their being biodegradable. Meanwhile, Leaf and Clark are enjoying a television show called "Judge Jerky", but Lewis walks in and cannot understand why they like the show so much, as he has to get to an actual court trial. Leaf wants to see his father in action and asks if he can go court with him, to which agrees, and Clark tags along as well. However, things later fall apart when a biodegradable suit he got from Ivy and Stuart starts falling apart on him, leaving him in his underwear in the courtroom, despite Ivy and Stuart's efforts to save him after racing over there. Stuart ultimately decides not to discipline Ivy and Stuart after they apologize to him and instead engages in a pillow fight with them. Guest stars: Jolie Hoang-Rappaport, Judy Kain, Violet Lux
11	"Those Medal-ing Kids!"	Jonathan Judge	Kuamel Stewart	March 16, 2019	118	0.78
Special guest star: Annie LeBlanc Guest star: Kheris Rogers
12	"Green Girl Returns"	Trevor Kirschner	Loni Steele Sosthand & Jim Hope	March 30, 2019	114	0.55
Guest stars: Savannah May, Carsyn Rose, Carlton Byrd
13	"Cousins Day"	Jody Margolin Hahn	Kuamel Stewart	April 6, 2019	116	0.75
Special guest star: Daniella Monet Guest stars: Jolie Hoang-Rappaport, Tait Blum
14	"Eyes on the Prize"	Robbie Countryman	Jeny Quine	April 13, 2019	107	0.62
Guest stars: O'Neill Monahan, Frank Cappello
15	"Operation: Mom"	Jonathan Judge	Kevin Kopelow & Heath Seifert	April 20, 2019	117	0.68
Guest stars: Stephanie Lemelin, Jasmine T.R. Gatewood
16	"Trapped for Life"	Robbie Countryman	Rachel McNevin	April 27, 2019	120	0.55
Guest star: Brendan Hunt
17	"IvyScares"	Jonathan Judge	Steve Freeman	May 4, 2019	103	0.60
Guest stars: John Paul Green, Emma Shannon
18	"Service for the Service"	Adam Weissman	Kevin Kopelow & Heath Seifert	May 11, 2019	109	0.63
Guest stars: Tyler Chase, Jasmine T.R. Gatewood (V.O.)
19	"Blending a Hand"	Robbie Countryman	Steve Freeman	June 1, 2019	119	0.57
Special guest star: Daniella Monet Guest star: Tait Blum
20	"Stain-cation"	Jody Margolin Hahn	Steve Freeman	June 8, 2019	110	0.47
Guest star: Stephanie Lemelin

== Ratings ==
Viewership and ratings per season of Cousins for Life
Season	Episodes	First aired		Last aired		Avg. viewers (millions)
Season	Episodes	Date	Viewers (millions)	Date	Viewers (millions)	Avg. viewers (millions)
1	20	November 24, 2018	0.62	June 8, 2019	0.47	0.71
