= Warped! =

American comedy television series

- Genre: Buddy comedy
- Created by: Kevin Kopelow & Heath Seifert
- Starring: Kate Godfrey; Anton Starkman; Ariana Molkara; Christopher Martinez
- Composers: Fred Rapoport; Rick Butler
- Country of origin: United States
- Original language: English
- No. of seasons: 1
- No. of episodes: 13

Production
- Executive producers: Kevin Kay; Kevin Kopelow; Heath Seifert; Jonathan Judge; Jeny Quine
- Producer: Craig Wyrick-Solari
- Cinematography: John Simmons
- Camera setup: Multi-camera
- Running time: 23 minutes
- Production companies: Kevin & Heath Productions; DJKay Entertainment; Nickelodeon Productions

Original release
- Network: Nickelodeon
- Release: January 16 – March 31, 2022

Warped! is an American buddy comedy television series created by Kevin Kopelow and Heath Seifert that aired on Nickelodeon from January 16 to March 31, 2022. The series stars Kate Godfrey, Anton Starkman, Ariana Molkara, and Christopher Martinez.

== Premise ==
Warped! follows Milo, the beloved head geek and manager at a popular comic book store, Warped!, whose microcosm is disrupted when his boss hires the loud and excitable Ruby.

== Cast ==
=== Main ===
- Kate Godfrey as Ruby, an eccentric and impulsive teen girl who starts working at the comic book store Warped! after moving to the city. Besides being an expert in comics like Milo, she is a good artist and helps him with his graphic novel by designing the characters.
- Anton Starkman as Milo, the manager of the comic book store Warped!, and a comic book expert. He often acts as the most responsible for the complicated situations that he and his friends experience. He dreams of writing a graphic novel.
- Ariana Molkara as Darby, a friend of Milo and Ruby, who likes to dress up as different fictional characters
- Christopher Martinez as Hurley, a friend of Milo and Ruby, who works at the pizzeria above the comic book store in the mall, though he often neglects his job

=== Recurring ===
- Makenzie Lee-Foster as Ren, a little girl who is often at the comic book store reading comics for a more mature audience
- Milan Carter as Wilson, the owner of Warped!, and Milo and Ruby's boss

== Production ==
On October 23, 2020, it was announced that Nickelodeon ordered a pilot for Warped! a comic bookstore comedy television series created by Kevin Kopelow and Heath Seifert. Kevin Kopelow, Heath Seifert, and Kevin Kay serve as executive producers. On March 18, 2021, it was announced that Nickelodeon officially green-lit Warped! as a buddy comedy television series. The series' cast includes Kate Godfrey as Ruby, Anton Starkman as Milo, Ariana Molkara as Darby, and Christopher Martinez as Hurley. The pilot episode was directed by Jonathan Judge. On December 20, 2021, it was announced that the series would premiere on January 20, 2022; however, the series began airing on January 16, 2022, branded as a sneak peek. The series ended after its only season on March 31 of that same year.

== Episodes ==
No.	Title	Directed by	Written by	Original release date	Prod. code	U.S. viewers (millions)
1	"Pilot!"	Jonathan Judge	Kevin Kopelow & Heath Seifert	January 16, 2022 (sneak peek); January 20, 2022 (official)	101	0.15
Guest stars: Kelly Vrooman, James III
2	"Challenged!"	Jonathan Judge	Kevin Kopelow & Heath Seifert	January 20, 2022	102	0.24
Guest stars: Makenzie Lee-Foster, Parker Pannell
3	"Duped!"	Trevor Kirschner	Heath Seifert & Kevin Kopelow	January 27, 2022	105	0.31
Guest stars: Makenzie Lee-Foster, Matt Bush
4	"Space-Conflicted!"	Leonard R. Garner, Jr.	Jeny Quine	February 3, 2022	107	0.25
Guest stars: Josh Server, Zehra Fazal
5	"Sandwiched!"	Jonathan Judge	Joey Manderino	February 10, 2022	103	0.23
6	"Plagiarized!"	Wendy Faraone	Tim Barnes	February 17, 2022	109	0.32
Special guest star: Kevin Smith Guest star: Makenzie Lee-Foster
7	"Creeped!"	Trevor Kirschner	Liz Magee	February 24, 2022	104	0.21
Guest star: Makenzie Lee-Foster
8	"Recorded!"	Leonard R. Garner, Jr.	Heath Seifert & Kevin Kopelow	March 3, 2022	108	0.21
Guest stars: Makenzie Lee-Foster, Emma Nasfell
9	"Limited!"	Wendy Faraone	Philippe Iujvidin	March 10, 2022	106	0.30
Guest stars: Makenzie Lee-Foster, Parker Pannell, Josh Reiter, Peng Peng, Justin James Farley
10	"Raccooned!"	Trevor Kirschner	Tim Barnes	March 17, 2022	112	0.36
Guest stars: Makenzie Lee-Foster, Parker Pannell, Emma Nasfell, Josh Reiter
11	"Hired!"	Morenike Joela Evans	Liz Magee	March 24, 2022	110	0.43
Guest stars: Makenzie Lee-Foster, Emma Nasfell, Rebecca Galarza
12	"Talented!"	Jonathan Judge	Jeny Quine	March 31, 2022	113	0.18
Guest stars: Makenzie Lee-Foster, Parker Pannell, Emma Nasfell, Josh Reiter
13	"Finished!"	Morenike Joela Evans	Joey Manderino	March 31, 2022	111	0.13
Guest stars: Makenzie Lee-Foster, Adam Kulbersh

== Ratings ==
Viewership and ratings per season of Warped!
Season	Episodes	First aired		Last aired		Avg. viewers (millions)
Season	Episodes	Date	Viewers (millions)	Date	Viewers (millions)	Avg. viewers (millions)
1	13	January 16, 2022	0.15	March 31, 2022	0.13	0.26
