= The Midnight Club =

American television series

- Genre: Horror; Mystery-thriller
- Created by: Mike Flanagan; Leah Fong
- Based on: The Midnight Club and other works of Christopher Pike
- Starring: Iman Benson; Igby Rigney; Ruth Codd; Annarah Cymone; Chris Sumpter; Adia; Aya Furukawa; Sauriyan Sapkota; Matt Biedel; Samantha Sloyan; Zach Gilford; Heather Langenkamp
- Composer: The Newton Brothers
- Country of origin: United States
- Original language: English
- No. of seasons: 1
- No. of episodes: 10

Production
- Executive producers: Mike Flanagan; Leah Fong; Trevor Macy; Julia Bicknell; Christopher Pike
- Running time: 49–58 minutes
- Production company: Intrepid Pictures

Original release
- Network: Netflix
- Release: October 7, 2022

The Midnight Club is an American horror mystery-thriller television series created by Mike Flanagan and Leah Fong, with Flanagan serving as showrunner, lead writer and executive producer. The series is set in a hospice and follows eight terminally ill young adults who form "the Midnight Club", meeting up each night to tell each other scary tales; it features an overarching story while also frequently depicting those tales on-screen. Although mostly based on the 1994 novel The Midnight Club by Christopher Pike, the series also adapts short stories from 27 other Pike books featured in the "Midnight Club" tales themselves.

The series stars Iman Benson, Adia, Igby Rigney, Ruth Codd, Aya Furukawa, Annarah Shephard, William Chris Sumpter, and Sauriyan Sapkota as the eight Midnight Club members, alongside Heather Langenkamp, Zach Gilford, Matt Biedel, and Samantha Sloyan as older adults working at or living near the hospice; in addition to their main characters, cast members also portray the ones featured in the "Midnight Club" tales.

The Midnight Club premiered on Netflix on October 7, 2022. Unlike all three of Flanagan's previous series, it is not a miniseries, and was intended as a limited-run series meant to run for two seasons. However, in December 2022, the series was canceled after one season.

== Overview ==
A group of eight close terminally ill young adults resides in the Brightcliffe Home hospice outside of Seattle run by an enigmatic doctor. They meet at midnight every night to tell each other scary stories. They have a pact that the first one to succumb to their disease is responsible for communicating with the others from beyond the grave.

== Cast ==
=== Main ===
- Iman Benson as Ilonka, a teenager with thyroid cancer who enrolls at Brightcliffe Hospice in the hopes of finding an unconventional cure
- Igby Rigney as Kevin, a member of the Midnight Club who has terminal leukemia
- Ruth Codd as Anya, Ilonka's roommate with an Irish accent and member of the Midnight Club. She has a right lower leg amputation as a result of bone cancer and uses a wheelchair for mobility.
- Annarah Cymone as Sandra, a member of the Midnight Club who has terminal lymphoma and is a devoted Christian
- Chris Sumpter as Spencer, a member of the Midnight Club who has AIDS
- Adia as Cheri, a member of the Midnight Club who has wealthy parents and is a pathological liar
- Aya Furukawa as Natsuki, a member of the Midnight Club who has depression and terminal ovarian cancer
- Sauriyan Sapkota as Amesh, a member of the Midnight Club who has glioblastoma and is the second newest arrival at Brightcliffe
- Matt Biedel as Tim, Ilonka's foster father
- Samantha Sloyan as Shasta, a woman who lives in a commune close to Brightcliffe Hospice
- Zach Gilford as Mark, a nurse practitioner at Brightcliffe Hospice
- Heather Langenkamp as Dr. Georgina Stanton, the enigmatic doctor who runs Brightcliffe Hospice

=== Recurring ===
- Emilija Baranac as Katherine, Kevin's girlfriend
- Daniel Diemer as Rhett, Anya's former friend
- Katie Parker as Aceso, founder of Paragon
- Larsen Thompson as Julia Jayne, a former patient at Brightcliffe Hospice
- Robert Longstreet as janitor at Brightcliffe Hospice
- William B. Davis as Mirror Man, a ghostly figure in Ilonka's visions
- Patricia Drake as a ghostly figure in Ilonka's visions
- Crystal Balint as Maggie, Ilonka's late foster mother
- Jenaya Ross as Tristan, bedridden Brightcliffe Hospice resident
- Henry Thomas as Freedom Jack, a character in Natsuki's Midnight Club story
- Alex Essoe as Poppy Corn, a character in Natsuki's Midnight Club story
- Rahul Kohli as Vincent, a character in Amesh's Midnight Club story
- Michael Trucco as Frederick, a character in Amesh's Midnight Club story

== Episodes ==
No.	Title	Directed by	Written by	Original release date
1	"The Final Chapter"	Mike Flanagan	Mike Flanagan and Leah Fong	October 7, 2022
In 1994, teenager Ilonka has terminal thyroid cancer, angering her as she had a good chance at college and was salutatorian. Following visions she's been having, Ilonka decides to go to Brightcliffe Hospice Care for Teenagers, where decades prior a teenager named Julia Jayne was supposedly cured of thyroid cancer. At Brightcliffe, Ilonka gets to know the teenagers already there; she bonds with Kevin, who has leukemia, but has trouble with her roommate, Anya. On the first night close to midnight, Ilonka follows Anya to the library, where the teens have gathered for a secret meeting of "the Midnight Club". In this club, they share scary stories and agree to a pact that whoever dies first, will try to come back to tell the others if there is an afterlife. As part of her initiation to the club, Ilonka tells a semi-fictionalized story about Julia Jayne.
2	"The Two Danas"	Mike Flanagan	Leah Fong & Julia Bicknell and Mike Flanagan	October 7, 2022
Ilonka tries to investigate Julia and Brightcliffe's past as the headquarters of a cult named "Paragon", but Dr. Stanton, who runs Brightcliffe, claims ignorance of both topics. Ilonka explores the woods around Brightcliffe and meets Shasta, a woman who lives nearby and believes in the land's healing properties. Anya sees a shadow with red eyes watching her. For Midnight Club, Anya tells a story about a ballerina who made a deal with the devil. Ilonka breaks into Dr. Stanton's office with Kevin's help and steals Julia's case file. Afterward, Ilonka has a vivid vision where she sees Brightcliffe as it was in the past and a ghostly old woman.
3	"The Wicked Heart"	Michael Fimognari	Elan Gale and Mike Flanagan	October 7, 2022
Ilonka reads Julia's case file and finds drawings with a symbol and the number "292.13". Ilonka tells Kevin about the visions and whispering voices she's heard her entire life that are now telling her to look into Julia, but he doesn't take her seriously, since all of them have medication-induced hallucinations. Tristan, one of the Brightcliffe patients, dies. Afterward, Natsuki thinks she sees Tristan in her room and tells the other Midnight Club members, but they decide it's not enough to be evidence of the fulfillment of their pact. Kevin tells the club a story about a teenage boy who is a serial killer. The story triggers Ilonka's memory, and she and Kevin follow Julia's symbol to a secret floor beneath the basement, where Ilonka sees a ghostly figure.
4	"Gimme a Kiss"	Michael Fimognari	Jamie Flanagan and Mike Flanagan	October 7, 2022
Ilonka and Kevin bring the rest of the Midnight Club to the secret floor. They find records of the original Midnight Club, which was founded by Julia in 1969, as well as evidence of cultists. Ilonka meets Shasta again. Sandra, who is religious, and Spencer, who has AIDS, get into an argument but reconcile after Sandra apologizes through a detective noir story she tells at Midnight Club. Spencer hears a voice calling to him through the intercom at Tristan's old room. Kevin goes to his girlfriend Katherine's senior prom. Ilonka realizes that "292.13" refers to the Dewey Decimal System, and uses it to search the Brightcliffe library for a book with the symbol on it. Anya sees the shadow again and collapses.
5	"See You Later"	Emmanuel Osei-Kuffour Jr.	Julia Bicknell and Mike Flanagan	October 7, 2022
Ilonka gives Anya CPR, reviving her. Ilonka reads the book, which is a diary written by Athena, a survivor of Paragon. Paragon, a health cult founded by Athena's mother Aceso in 1931, practiced five-goddess worship and blood sacrifice, and culminated in a group murder-suicide orchestrated to extend Aceso's lifespan. Ilonka thinks that Julia read Athena's diary and found a way to cure her cancer. Ilonka has another vision of old Brightcliffe and follows the old woman through the halls into the library, where she bumps into Kevin. At Midnight Club, Spencer tells everyone about the intercom voice, and Amesh tells a story about a gamer who's invited to play a seemingly unwinnable war game. Anya confesses to Ilonka that she's scared of the shadow, which makes Ilonka more determined to find a cure.
6	"Witch"	Axelle Carolyn	Chinaka Hodge and Mike Flanagan	October 7, 2022
At Midnight Club, Kevin continues his story about the teenage serial killer, and Ilonka tells a story about a modern-day witch who tries to use magic to help her friends. Anya collapses again, but Ilonka refuses to accept her fate peacefully. Ilonka meets Shasta in the woods; Shasta reveals that she knows about the five-goddess worship and that the religion is much older than Paragon. Ilonka asks the Midnight Club to do a ritual following Shasta's instructions, and all of them participate.
7	"Anya"	Axelle Carolyn	Jamie Flanagan	October 7, 2022
Dr. Stanton catches the club. The ritual was completed but Anya is in a coma, where she dreams that she healed and returned to society, but her life is empty and she outlived her friends. She realizes she's dreaming when she recognizes the dream as an amalgamation of the Midnight Club's stories. Anya can hear her friends' voices, and they tell her a story where all of them got better and lived out long lives together. Anya dies in her sleep. Shasta tells Ilonka that the ritual doesn't work every time. Dr. Stanton burns Athena's journal and debates whether to shut down the Midnight Club, which she has known about all along. Ilonka hears Dr. Stanton tell someone on the phone that one of her patients might not be terminal. Ilonka sees a ghostly old woman and man in her room, and the woman declares that she's "hungry".
8	"Road to Nowhere"	Viet Nguyen	Julia Bicknell and Mike Flanagan	October 7, 2022
Ilonka confronts Dr. Stanton about what she overheard. Dr. Stanton swears her to secrecy, but Ilonka tells Kevin. Ilonka believes she's the one who's been cured by the ritual and tells Shasta, who invites her to join her commune. Spencer visits his mother to get closure on her disowning him for his sexuality. Midnight Club is canceled because Dr. Stanton locked the library. Natsuki, who is dating Amesh, tells him her planned Midnight Club story about a girl who gives a ride to a pair of hitchhikers. Ilonka goes to the building's secret floor where she sees the old woman; when Ilonka touches the old woman, the vision transforms into Kevin.
9	"The Eternal Enemy"	Viet Nguyen	Elan Gale and Mike Flanagan	October 7, 2022
Sandra is the one whose cancer has regressed, and Dr. Stanton tells her that her terminal diagnosis was an error. Kevin tells Ilonka that he's been sleepwalking to the secret floor ever since they found it and that he's been seeing the same visions and figures as her. They tell the other Midnight Club members but are met with skepticism, especially when Sandra confesses that she was the one who spoke to Spencer through Tristan's intercom. Disillusioned, Ilonka goes to Shasta, who reveals that she is Julia Jayne. At Midnight Club, Spencer tells a story about a college student whose VCR records news from the future. Ilonka sneaks Shasta and other female commune members into the building to do the ritual to heal Ilonka, but Ilonka is suspicious when the ritual is different from the one Shasta taught her. Dr. Stanton interrupts the ritual before it can be completed.
10	"Midnight"	Morgan Beggs	Mike Flanagan and Leah Fong	October 7, 2022
Dr. Stanton interrupts the ritual, saving Ilonka and the other women's lives, but Shasta escapes. Shasta tried to use Ilonka for a murder-suicide ritual that would have theoretically extended Shasta's own lifespan. In the past, Shasta/Julia's cancer regressed, but Shasta attributed it to magic instead of luck and is trying to do the ritual again because cancer returned. Sandra goes home after goodbyes to her friends. Amesh starts seeing the shadow following him. Spencer's mother visits him on Family Day. Kevin breaks up with his girlfriend to pursue a relationship with Ilonka. Ilonka discovers that Anya's broken ballerina statue became whole again; she reports this to the Midnight Club, who take this as a sign from Anya. Kevin finishes his story about the teenage serial killer, and Ilonka finishes her story about the witch, with the rest of the Club helping her tell the ending. The old man and woman Ilonka and Kevin have been seeing turn out to be the original founders of the Brightcliffe building, and Stanton has a tattoo of the five-goddess cult.

== Production ==
=== Development ===
In May 2020, it was announced an adaptation of Christopher Pike's young adult novel The Midnight Club would be created for Netflix by Mike Flanagan and Leah Fong. In an interview for IGN, Flanagan revealed that he was profoundly inspired by Nickelodeon's horror anthology series Are You Afraid of the Dark? On the series' release in October 2022, Flanagan confirmed that the series would also adapt all "28 books" of Pike's, having pitched the series as "'The Midnight Club' — but the stories the kids tell [each other] will be other Christopher Pike books", planning for multiple seasons. On December 1, 2022, Netflix canceled the series after one season. Following its cancellation, Flanagan revealed what was planned for later seasons on his Tumblr, including the ultimate fates of the various characters and answers to the show's lingering mysteries.

=== Writing ===
Mike Flanagan's sibling Jamie, who worked on The Midnight Club as a writer and co-producer, stated that the club subplot was not part of the writers' original vision, and came to be because of Netflix executives, who wanted a supernatural element to the main plot: "For a while, after Stranger Things, everyone wanted teenage protagonists with some kind of magical powers, and [executives were] like, God, no, this is about children dying in a hospice, they don't have magical powers!"

=== Casting ===
Flanagan confirmed the cast in a series of tweets on Twitter: Adia, Igby Rigney, Ruth Codd, Aya Furukawa, Annarah Shephard, William Chris Sumpter, Sauriyan Sapkota as the titular cast, and Heather Langenkamp as the doctor presiding over the hospice of the terminally ill. Zach Gilford and Matt Biedel, and recurring Flanagan collaborators Samantha Sloyan and Robert Longstreet appear in recurring roles. In April 2021, Iman Benson, Larsen Thompson, William B. Davis, Crystal Balint, and Patricia Drake joined the cast.

=== Filming ===
The project began production on March 15, 2021, in Burnaby, British Columbia, and was planned to conclude on September 8, 2021, but actually finished production on September 10. The first two episodes of the series are directed by Flanagan, and other episodes in the season were helmed by directors Axelle Carolyn, Emmanuel Osei-Kuffour, Michael Fimognari, Morgan Beggs, and Viet Nguyen.

== Release ==
The Midnight Club was released on Netflix on October 7, 2022.

== Reception ==
The review aggregator website Rotten Tomatoes reported an 85% approval rating with an average rating of 7.4/10, based on 59 critic reviews. The website's critics' consensus reads, "Mike Flanagan's hot streak of heartfelt horror stories continues strong in The Midnight Club, a tale of terminal teenagers told with jolts and joie de vivre." Metacritic, which uses a weighted average, assigned a score of 65 out of 100 based on 21 critics, indicating "generally favorable reviews".

The first episode of the series broke the Guinness World Record for the most scripted jump-scares in a single episode of television at 21 jump-scares.

Between October 2 and October 23, 2022, The Midnight Club recorded 90.31 million hours viewed in the Netflix top 10s.
