= Woke (TV series) =

2020s American TV series

- Genre: Comedy
- Created by: Keith Knight; Marshall Todd
- Starring: Lamorne Morris; Blake Anderson; T. Murph; Rose McIver; Sasheer Zamata
- Country of origin: United States
- Original language: English
- No. of seasons: 2
- No. of episodes: 16

Production
- Executive producers: Keith Knight; Marshall Todd; Jay Dyer; Maurice Marable; Will Gluck; Richard Schwartz; Eric Christian Olsen; Kate Schumaecker; Anthony King
- Running time: 22–34 minutes
- Production companies: Cloud Nine Productions; Olive Bridge Entertainment; Young Monk Productions; ABC Signature (Note: Credited as ABC Studios); Sony Pictures Television Studios

Original release
- Network: Hulu
- Release: September 9, 2020 – April 8, 2022

Woke is an American comedy television series co-created by Keith Knight and Marshall Todd and starring Lamorne Morris. The series premiered on Hulu on September 9, 2020. On November 17, 2020, Hulu renewed the series for a second season, which premiered on April 8, 2022. In June 2022, Hulu cancelled the series after two seasons.

== Plot ==
Keef Knight, creator of Toast & Butter, is a black cartoonist on the verge of mainstream success. He prides himself on 'keeping it light' and shies away from taking controversial stances. After being racially profiled by overly aggressive policemen, the traumatized Keef finds that he's able to see and hear inanimate objects talking to him. Keef must figure out how to maintain his relationships and a career as a "woke" black man.

The show is live action with animated elements.

== Cast ==
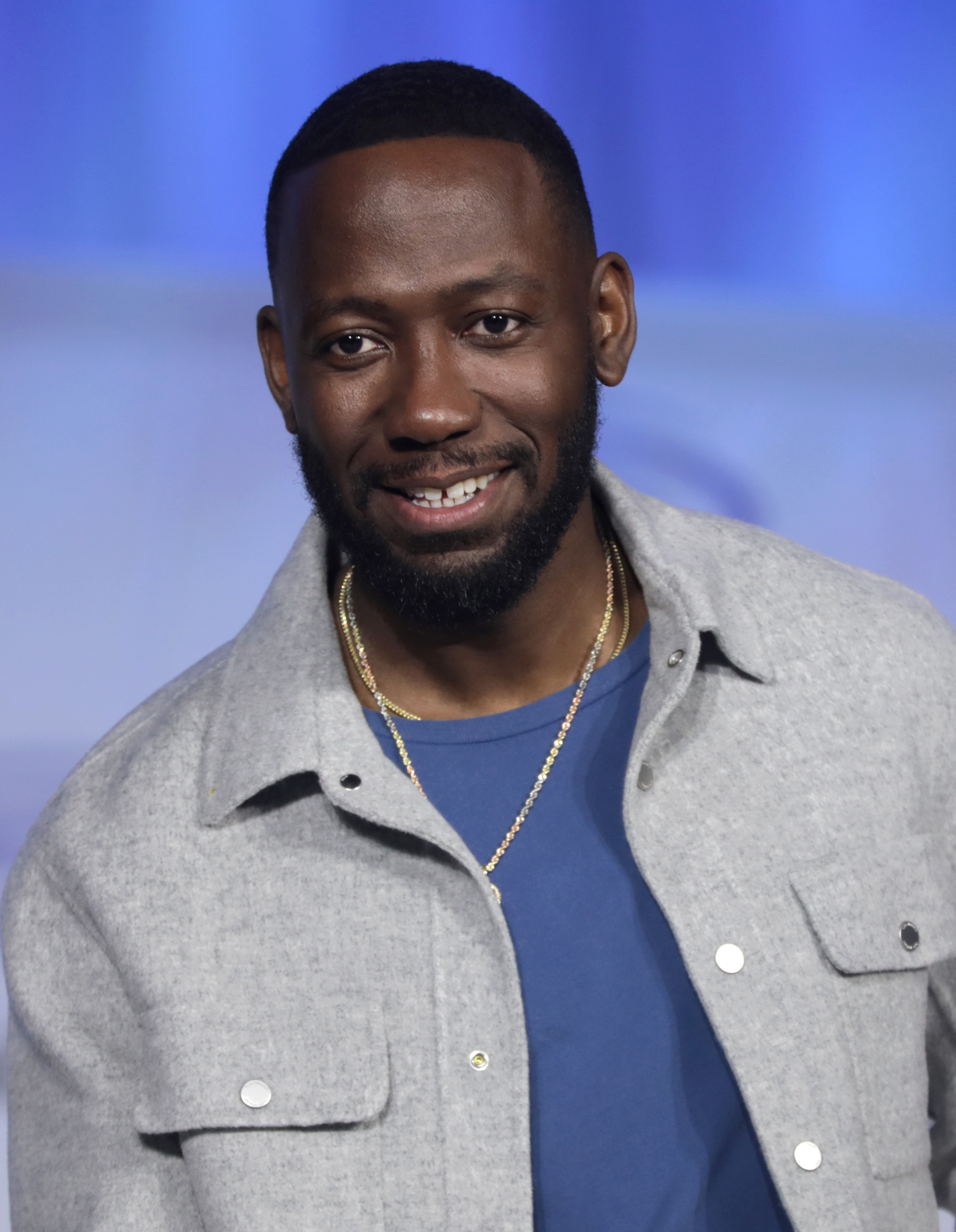
Lamorne Morris plays Keef

- Lamorne Morris as Keef, a cartoonist based on cartoonist and co-creator Keith Knight
- Blake Anderson as Gunther, one of Keef's roommates
- T. Murph as Clovis, Keef's best friend and roommate
- Rose McIver as Adrienne, an artist and Keef's girlfriend (season 1)
- Sasheer Zamata as Ayana, a reporter for The Bay Arean who calls Keef out
- Aimee Garcia as Laura Salgado (season 2)

Voice only

- J.B. Smoove as Marker
- Nicole Byer and Eddie Griffin as 40 oz Bottles
- Cree Summer as Paper Bag
- Tony Hale as Butter
- Sam Richardson as Toast
- Jack McBrayer as Sad face
- Cedric the Entertainer as Trashcan
- Keith David as Bible

== Episodes ==
=== Series overview ===
Season	Episodes	Originally released
1	8	September 9, 2020
2	8	April 8, 2022

=== Season 1 (2020) ===
No. overall	No. in season	Title	Directed by	Written by	Original release date
1	1	"Rhymes with Broke"	Maurice "Mo" Marable	Keith Knight & Marshall Todd	September 9, 2020
Keef is having a really good day. After a photo shoot at his publisher's in the run up to his appearance at Golden Con, he goes to meet his girlfriend Trina to talk about moving in together. The next day, while hanging flyers for his Golden Con appearance, Keef is thrown to the ground and handcuffed because he supposedly resembles a mugger loose in the area. On his way home after being traumatized, he imagines inanimate objects-- two bottles of malt liquor, a trashcan, his Sharpie, an antique object on a TV program he's watching-- talking to him, telling him that the world is racist and it's time for him to stand up for himself. His best friend Clovis pretends to be a professional athlete to get a woman. His friend and roommate Gunther pitches a new powdered energy drink that is basically cocaine.
2	2	"What Prequels?"	Maurice "Mo" Marable	Conor Galvin	September 9, 2020
Keef goes to Bloom & Hill to smooth things and finds out that his meltdown has gone viral. He goes to the offices of the Bay Arean to ask them to take the video down, but Ayana refuses and suggest he embrace what's coming. Trina checks in with Keef but he ignores her text. Keef goes to the comic shop to give an art class and tries to write another Toast & Butter comic but the Marker refuses to let him and the result is shaky. He goes back to Bloom & Hill but he's denied entry. He goes home where Trina is waiting for him, upset that he's not talked to her in two days. His roommates attempt to console him but Keef goes to his room to draw.
3	3	"Gig E. Smalls"	Maurice "Mo" Marable	Keith Knight	September 9, 2020
Keef runs into Ayana at a sneaker release and shows her his latest, more edgy, cartoon. Bloom & Hill serves Keef with a C&D threatening to sue if he posts any more Toast & Butter comics online, and demanding he repay his advance. Keef gets a job with a rideshare to recoup the money and meets a woman who wants to pay him to attend a party where he is the only Black person. He meets Adrienne and feels inspired to draw again. Clovis stalks Ayana on social media. In his capacity as temporary landlord, Gunther runs afoul of a tenant who refuses to pay his rent with a check.
4	4	"Black People for Rent"	Maurice "Mo" Marable	Rochee Jeffrey	September 9, 2020
Keef and Adrienne hook up. Keef's Black People for Rent posters blow up on social media, and get actual responses, which Ayana thinks would make a good story. Clovis capitalizes on the idea by creating merch. Gunter is shaken by the overt racism of some of the responders.
5	5	"Oaktown Get-Down"	Chioke Nassor	Marshall Todd	September 9, 2020
Adrienne tries to get Keef's mind off of the Black People for Rent backlash. Keef gets psyched up to present his new work at an artists' salon Ayana is hosting. He balks when Clovis and Gunther insist on tagging along, and Adrienne shows up. Ayana sees a new side of Clovis. Gunther makes some new friends. Guest: Nathan Lee Graham as Darque Noir
6	6	"Dap, Peace, Fuck You"	Chioke Nassor	Brittany A. Miller	September 9, 2020
The after party. Adrienne and Keef talk about his portrayal of her and what it means for their new relationship. Clovis sees a new side of Ayana. Gunther finds himself in a threesome.
7	7	"Prayers for Kubby"	Maurice "Mo" Marable	Jay Dyer	September 9, 2020
Another artist has taken over Toast & Butter. Keef takes a bus to meet a lawyer across town, with Clovis and Gunther in tow. Kubby the koala escapes from the zoo, slowing traffic and causing Keef to miss his appointment. He lashes out at the crowd at a rally for Kubby and realizes he needs help dealing with his trauma.
8	8	"Blue Lies Matter"	Maurice "Mo" Marable	Conor Galvin & Brittany A. Miller	September 9, 2020
After two months of therapy, Keef is finally able to turn his pain into art. But then the officer who assaulted Keef sues him for portraying the officer negatively in his work. The SFPD agrees to make the case go away if Keef sits down with the officer for a beer. Clovis, Gunther, and Ayana all have differing opinions on how he should handle the situation. Should he use the opportunity to take a stand or just swallow his pride?

=== Season 2 (2022) ===
No. overall	No. in season	Title	Directed by	Written by	Original release date
9	1	"A Knight in the Park"	Maurice "Mo" Marable	Anthony King	April 8, 2022
Keef has increasingly become a prominent civil activist. He is tasked to speak at a local rally for racial equality, but is annoyed when he sees that other protesters are using it to further their independent causes. He plans to repeat an old speech, but finds that a video of it was uploading, making it obvious if he were to give it again. With the advice of Clovis, he changes his speech to have a generic, uplifting message, and the speech is later retweeted by rapper Common, giving Keef newfound fame on social media.
10	2	"Free At Last"	Chris Robinson	Crystal Jenkins	April 8, 2022
While out at a bar, Keef sees an advertisement for free Wi-Fi that references Martin Luther King Jr.'s I Have a Dream. Annoyed that a civil rights speech has been co-opted, Keef publicly denounces the advertising agency, Sifar. The advertisers reach out to Keef an attempt to get his feedback for more appropriate advertisements, but he chastises them for not consulting with people of color before creating ads. Sifar later creates a press release that falsely claims endorsement from Keef; Sifar's majority shareholder, Laura, fires the advertiser and agrees to sponsor Keef.
11	3	"Papa's Got a Brand New Boil"	Maurice "Mo" Marable	Shaun Diston	April 8, 2022
Keef is meeting with Laura to discuss his plans to use her sponsorship money, and states that he wants to directly provide help to those in need. He receives a call from Clovis, who needs help as his father, Mr. Jackson, is in town. Keef rushes to help Clovis meet with Mr. Jackson, who refuses to accept modern technology and medical care, despite developing a massive boil on his foot. Mr. Jackson, a former Black Panther Party member, criticizes Keef's activism, which he believes to be ineffective. Clovis responds by accusing Mr. Jackson that he used activism as a means to avoid being a father. After a brief fight, Mr. Jackson's boil is lanced and healed, and he is gifted a pair of shoes from Clovis. In turn, Mr. Jackson donates his shoes to a homeless man, which inspires Keef to use his funding to gift shoes to those who need them.
12	4	"Sole Train"	Chris Robinson	Asmita Paranjape	April 8, 2022
Keef releases a line of thick-soled shoes to donate to homeless people in San Francisco, but is dismayed when he sees that his shoes are not being worn and instead are being thrown out. Ayana is critical of Keef and his relationship with Laura, as he believes they are attempting to only use money to fix a problem without understanding it properly. Laura attempts to prove to Ayana and Keef that her wealth is the reason she is able to help people, and that money is a central requirement for activism.
13	5	"Who's Your Kin"	Maurice "Mo" Marable	Kyra Jones	April 8, 2022
14	6	"Black Exceptionalism"	Katrelle Kindred	Marshall Todd & Crystal Jenkins	April 8, 2022
15	7	"Black Trauma V"	Katrelle Kindred	Brittany Miller	April 8, 2022
16	8	"Kill Keef Knight"	Maurice "Mo" Marable	Keith Knight	April 8, 2022

== Production ==
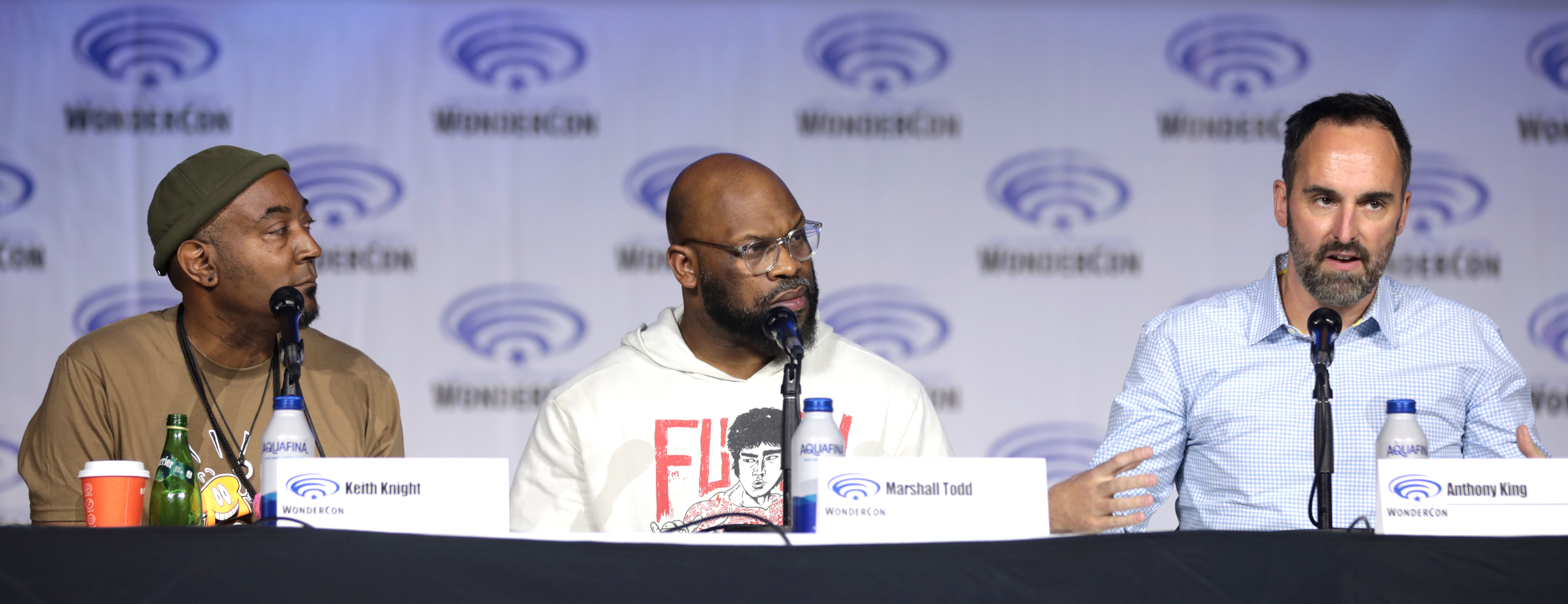
Co-creators Keith Knight and Marshall Todd as well as writer Anthony King at WonderCon 2022

Keith Knight serves as the inspiration of the show.

Jay Dyer served as the showrunner for the first season. Anthony King was the showrunner for Season 2.

== Release ==
Woke was released on Hulu on September 9, 2020. The first trailer was released on August 8, 2020.

== Reception ==
=== Critical response ===
Review aggregator Rotten Tomatoes reported an approval rating of 74% based on 42 reviews, with an average rating of 5.8/10 for the show's first season. The website's critics consensus reads, "Though Woke's first season doesn't quite know what it wants to say about racism in America, its solid ensemble—led by a well-cast Lamorne Morris—and some surreal silliness make it a messy conversation worth watching." Metacritic gave the series a weighted average score of 61 out of 100 based on 19 reviews, indicating "generally favorable reviews".

=== Accolades ===
Year	Award	Category	Nominee(s)	Result	Ref.
2021	Location Managers Guild International Awards	Outstanding Locations in a Contemporary Television Series	Kent Sponagle, John K. Alexander	Nominated	
2021	Black Reel Awards	Outstanding Directing, Comedy Series	Maurice Marable	Won	
2021	Black Reel Awards	Outstanding Writing, Comedy Series	Rochee Jeffrey	Won	
2021	Black Reel Awards	Outstanding Actor, Comedy Series	Lamorne Morris	Nominated	
2021	Leo Awards	Best Guest Performance by a Male in a Dramatic Series	Link Baker	Won	
2022	Black Reel Awards	Outstanding Actor, Comedy Series	Lamorne Morris	Nominated	

== See also ==
- Wonderfalls
- Dear White People
- Woke culture
