= Murder Among Friends (TV series) =

2016 American documentary TV series

- Genre: Documentary true crime
- Narrated by: Matt Riedy
- Country of origin: United States
- Original language: English
- No. of seasons: 2
- No. of episodes: 20

Production
- Executive producers: Brian Puterman; David Cargill; Mike Mathis; Joe Peicott; Tim Baney
- Running time: 42 minutes
- Production company: Mike Mathis Productions

Original release
- Network: Investigation Discovery
- Release: April 19, 2016 – August 17, 2017

Murder Among Friends is an American documentary television series on Investigation Discovery that debuted on April 19, 2016. The series examines murders in which a group of friends decide to kill one of their own. Murder Among Friends aired for two seasons, ending in 2017.

== Episodes ==
=== Series overview ===
Season	Episodes	Originally released	
Season	Episodes	First released	Last released
1	10	April 19, 2016	June 28, 2016
2	10	June 15, 2017	August 17, 2017

=== Season 1 (2016) ===
No. overall	No. in season	Title	Featured victim	Original release date
1	1	"Murder Circle"	Matthew Silliman in Apex, North Carolina	April 19, 2016
2	2	"Murder Pact"	Bobby Kent in Hollywood, Florida	April 26, 2016
3	3	"Dead Lift"	Jared Whaley in Las Vegas	May 3, 2016
4	4	"Dear Friend, Dead Friend"	Bill Teck in Manor, Pennsylvania	May 10, 2016
5	5	"Friend Fatale"	Jason Sweeney on the outskirts of Philadelphia	May 17, 2016
6	6	"Friends in Low Places"	Scott Catenacci in Bellevue, Nebraska	May 24, 2016
7	7	"The Rabbit Hole"	Sarah Starling in Bellevue, Washington	May 31, 2016
8	8	"Dungeons and Dying"	Brittany Killgore in Fallbrook, California	June 7, 2016
9	9	"Best Friends For-never"	Chester Poage in Spearfish, South Dakota	June 14, 2016
10	10	"Unholy Friends"	Jacob Hendershot in Parker, Florida	June 28, 2016

=== Season 2 (2017) ===
No. overall	No. in season	Title	Featured victim	Original release date
11	1	"Date with Dystiny"	Dystiny Myers in Santa Maria, California	June 15, 2017
12	2	"The Girls of Belmont Ave."	Stacey Hanna in Richmond, Virginia	June 22, 2017
13	3	"Puzzle in Pieces"	John Morgan in Johnstown, New York	June 29, 2017
14	4	"Murder Party"	Gwen Araujo in Newark, California	July 6, 2017
15	5	"Hell Storm"	Matthew Stegman in Des Moines, Iowa	July 13, 2017
16	6	"Stick to the Plan"	Cassie Jo Stoddart in Pocatello, Idaho	July 20, 2017
17	7	"Band of Brothers"	Dutcher Family Murders in Guffey, Colorado	July 27, 2017
18	8	"The Lord Taketh"	Antoinetta McKoy in Durham, North Carolina	August 3, 2017
19	9	"Muscle Bound"	Melissa James in Las Vegas	August 10, 2017
20	10	"Law of the Wild"	Lora Sinner in Redding, California	August 17, 2017
