= Kenya Barris =

American television writer and producer (born 1974)

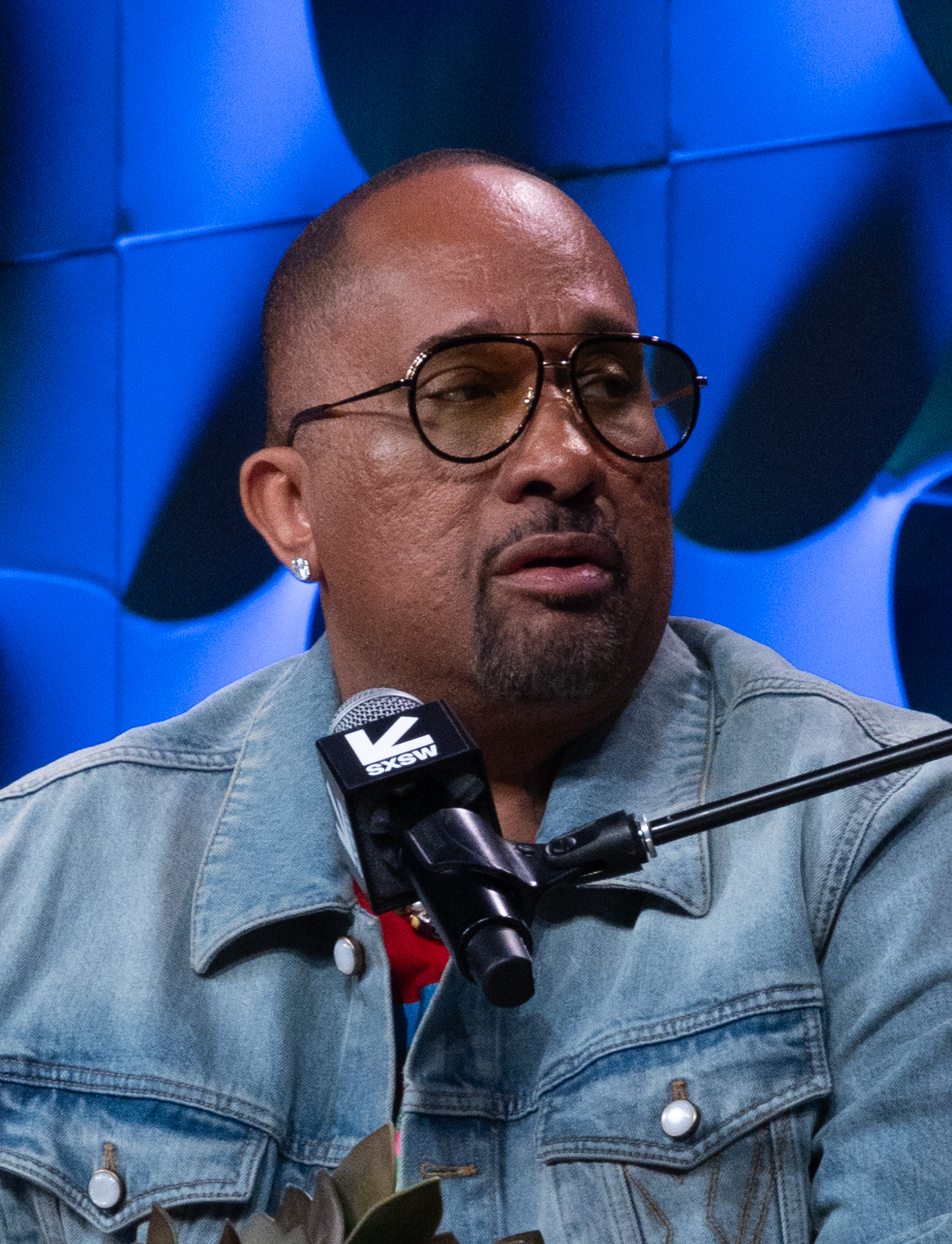
- Barris at SXSW 2025
- Born: August 9, 1974 (age 52); Inglewood, California, U.S.
- Other name: Kenya 'Yee' Harris
- Education: Clark Atlanta University
- Occupations: Film and television writer; producer; director; actor
- Years active: 1997–present
- Spouse: Rainbow Edwards Barris (m. 1999; sep. 2022)
- Children: 6

Kenya Barris (born August 9, 1974) is an American film and television writer, producer, director, and actor. He is best known as the creator of the ABC sitcom Black-ish (2014–2022).

== Early life and education ==
Barris, the second-youngest among four siblings, was born to Tina, who worked as a real estate agent, and her former husband Patrick, who was a factory worker at General Motors. Barris grew up in Inglewood, California and later moved with his family to the Valley, settling in Pacoima, Los Angeles. He was named after the country of Kenya, which his father had visited. His parents divorced when he was a child.

He is an alumnus of Clark Atlanta University.

== Career ==
Barris has created numerous television shows, including the critically acclaimed Black-ish. The award-winning series also has two spin-offs, Grown-ish and Mixed-ish, and a third potential spin-off Old-ish. He was a writer for The Game, Girlfriends, and Soul Food. Barris co-created and produced America's Next Top Model with Tyra Banks. He penned the film Girls Trip. He co-produced the 2019 film Little and co-wrote the screenplay for the 2019 theatrical release Shaft.

In 2020, Barris made his acting debut in #BlackAF, a series he developed for Netflix, co-starring Rashida Jones and Iman Benson. In October 2020, Barris announced that he would write, produce, and direct a biopic on comedian Richard Pryor for MGM.

Also in 2020, it was reported his production company, Khalabo Ink Society, was considering a deal with ViacomCBS. His company entered a multi-project development deal with Audible in 2021.

In 2021, it was reported that Barris was developing a potential television series, Brown-ish, with Eva Longoria.

In August 2022, it was announced that Barris would write and direct a modern remake of The Wizard of Oz. In January 2024, he confirmed that he finished penning the script for the film and announced that he is also in development on a modern remake of It's a Wonderful Life, with the intention to cast a person of color in the lead role of George Bailey.

In August 2025, Barris faced controversy over a planned CBS sitcom set in post-wildfire Altadena, California. Local residents and commentators argued that the premise risked trivializing the devastation of the Eaton Canyon Fire, which killed dozens and displaced thousands. Some community members described the project as being in "poor taste," while others suggested it could bring attention to Altadena’s recovery if handled sensitively. The debate highlighted broader concerns about how mainstream entertainment portrays communities affected by disaster.

== Personal life ==
Barris married anesthesiologist Dr. Rania "Rainbow" Edwards Barris in 2000. They have six children. His wife filed for divorce in 2014, and Barris filed for divorce in 2019: the couple reconciled and withdrew their divorce petitions both times. Barris filed for divorce a second time in 2022.

== Filmography ==
=== Films ===
Title	Year	Credited as				Studio	Notes
Title	Year	Writer	Director	Producer	Other	Studio	Notes
Barbershop: The Next Cut	2016	Yes	No	Yes	No	Metro-Goldwyn-Mayer / Warner Bros. Pictures	Co-producer; Co-written with Tracy Oliver
Girls Trip	2017	Yes	No	No	No	Universal Pictures	Co-written with Tracy Oliver and Erica Rivinoja
Little	2019	No	No	Yes	No	Universal Pictures	
Shaft	2019	Yes	No	Executive	No	Warner Bros. Pictures / Netflix	Co-written with Alex Barnow
The Witches	2020	Yes	No	No	No	Warner Bros. Pictures	Co-written with Robert Zemeckis and Guillermo del Toro
Soul	2020	No	No	No	Yes	Pixar Animation Studios	Special thanks
Coming 2 America	2021	Yes	No	Executive	No	Amazon Studios / Paramount Pictures	Co-written with Barry W. Blaustein and David Sheffield
Cheaper by the Dozen	2022	Yes	No	Yes	No	Disney+ / Walt Disney Pictures / 20th Century Studios	Co-written with Jenifer Rice-Genzuk Henry and Craig Titley
You People	2023	Yes	Yes	Yes	No	Netflix	Directing debut Co-written with Jonah Hill
White Men Can't Jump	2023	Yes	No	No	No	Hulu / 20th Century Studios	Co-written with Doug Hall
The Underdoggs	2024	No	No	Yes	No	Metro-Goldwyn-Mayer	
Michael	2026	No	No	No	Yes	Lionsgate / GK Films	Additional off-screen literary material

=== Television series ===
Title	Year	Credited as					Network	Notes
Title	Year	Actor	Creator	Director	Writer	Executive producer	Network	Notes
Girlfriends	2000–2008	No	No	No	Yes	No	UPN/The CW	
America's Next Top Model	2003–2018	No	Yes	No	No	No	UPN/The CW/VH1	
Soul Food	2002–2004	No	No	No	Yes	No	Showtime	
Like Family	2004	No	No	No	Yes	No	The WB	
Listen Up	2004–2005	No	No	No	Yes	No	CBS	
The Game	2006–2014	No	No	No	Yes	No	The CW/BET	
Are We There Yet?	2011–2012	No	No	No	Yes	No	TBS	
I Hate My Teenage Daughter	2012–2013	No	No	No	Yes	No	Fox	
Black-ish	2014–2022	No	Yes	Yes	Yes	Yes	ABC	
Grown-ish	2018–2024	No	Yes	No	Yes	Yes	Freeform	
Mixed-ish	2019–2021	No	Yes	No	Yes	Yes	ABC	
Astronomy Club: The Sketch Show	2019	No	No	No	No	Yes	Netflix	
BlackAF	2020	Yes	Yes	Yes	Yes	Yes	Netflix	Character: Kenya Barris
We the People	2021	No	No	No	No	Yes	Netflix	
Entergalactic	2022	No	Yes	No	No	Yes	Netflix	Television special
The Vince Staples Show	2024–2025	No	No	No	No	Yes	Netflix	
Diarra from Detroit	2024–present	No	No	No	No	Yes	BET+	

== Awards ==
In 2019, Black-ish won several NAACP Image Awards. It was named best comedy series and Tracee Ellis Ross and Anthony Anderson took acting honors. Black-ish was the winner of the Entertainment and Children's Peabody Award in 2016. Barris and Black-ish also won the 2017 NAACP Image Award for Outstanding Writing in a Comedy Series. Barris was nominated for the same award in 2018. He was also nominated for a Primetime Emmy Award for Outstanding Comedy Series in 2016, 2017, 2018, and 2021, and a PGA Award for Outstanding Producer of Episodic Television, Comedy for Black-ish in 2014. In 2016, Barris won the Rod Serling Award for Advancing Social Justice Through Popular Media.

In 2018, he donated $1 million to Clark Atlanta University, and was granted an honorary doctorate in humane letters.
