= BlackAF =

American sitcom

#blackAF
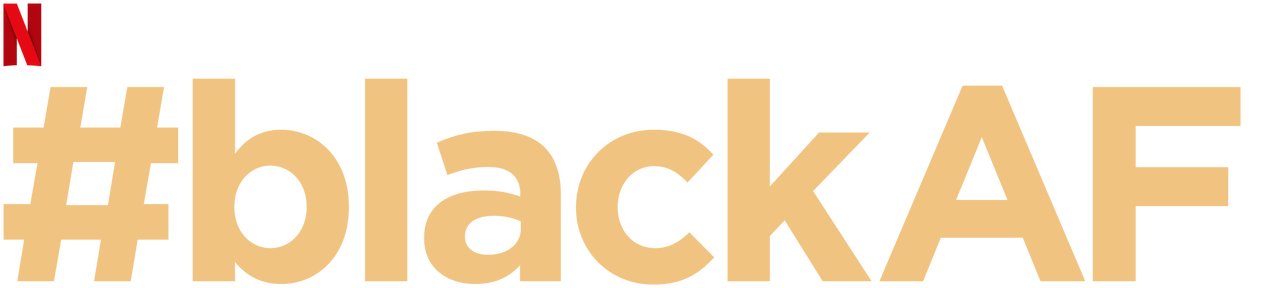
- Genre: Mockumentary
- Created by: Kenya Barris
- Starring: Rashida Jones; Kenya Barris; Iman Benson; Genneya Walton; Scarlet Spencer; Justin Claiborne; Ravi Cabot-Conyers
- Music by: Vincent Jones
- Opening theme: "Win" by Jay Rock
- Country of origin: United States
- Original language: English
- No. of seasons: 1
- No. of episodes: 8

Production
- Executive producers: Kenya Barris; Rashida Jones; Hale Rothstein
- Producers: Bryan J. Raber; Yassir Lester; Doug Hall; Danny Segal; Isaac Schamis; Mychelle Deschamps
- Production location: Los Angeles
- Cinematography: Adam Bricker
- Editors: Steven Rasch; Christine Armstrong
- Camera setup: Single-camera
- Running time: 32-48 minutes
- Production companies: Khalabo Ink Society; Le Train Train

Original release
- Network: Netflix
- Release: April 17, 2020

#blackAF is an American sitcom created by Kenya Barris. It premiered on Netflix on April 17, 2020. The title derives from AAVE Internet slang, where "AF" is a term of emphasis, meaning "as fuck". In June 2020, the series was renewed for a second season. A year later, the renewal decision was reversed and the series was canceled after one season.

== Premise ==
The series stars Barris as a fictionalized version of himself. The official synopsis reads: "#blackAF uncovers the messy, unfiltered, and often hilarious world of what it means to be a 'new money' black family trying to 'get it right' in a modern world where 'right' is no longer a fixed concept."

== Cast ==
=== Main ===
- Rashida Jones as Joya Barris
- Kenya Barris as Kenya Barris
- Iman Benson as Drea Barris
- Genneya Walton as Chloe Barris
- Scarlet Spencer as Izzy Barris
- Justin Claiborne as Pops Barris
- Ravi Cabot-Conyers as Kam Barris

=== Recurring ===
- Richard Gardenhire Jr. as Brooklyn Barris
- Gil Ozeri as Danny
- Bumper Robinson as Broadway
- Nia Long as Lavette
- Angela Kinsey as Leeza
- Doug Hall as Marquise

Ava DuVernay, Will Packer, Tyler Perry, Issa Rae, Tim Story, Scooter Braun, Lena Waithe, Jay Rock and Steven Levitan made appearances as themselves in the series.

== Episodes ==
No.	Title	Directed by	Written by	Original release date
1	"because of slavery"	Ken Kwapis	Kenya Barris	April 17, 2020
Drea, Kenya's second eldest daughter, is making a documentary about her family as part of her application for NYU a film school.Kenya's family have a Sunday brunch to celebrate Kenya's new deal with Netflix.The deal is shown to be #blackAF. While leaving Kenya encounters Steve Levitan whose comments offend Barris. Barris back at his house starts to rant about how slavery made black people feel that they have to wear fashionable clothing to be accepted. He says that he wears track suits and gold chains because of the 'white gaze'.
2	"because of slavery too"	Ken Kwapis	Kenya Barris	April 17, 2020
Kenya and Joya have a short fight in front of the children at breakfast. They decide to go to the Lunar Butterfly Festival as a way of working on their marriage. When the assistant jokingly says that they have to do Molly at the festival, Kenya and Joya share a memory of the last time they took Molly; when Chloe was young. Kenya, Joya and Danny go to an Armenian dealer to get Molly. While preparing to leave for the festival Kenya sees Chloe's Instagram post of her at their pool in a bikini. He is angered by this and confronts Joya about but she pretends to know little about the matter. At the festival Kenya bumps into Chloe and is initially repulsed by her presence. They later apologize to each other for their initial reaction and admit to both being high. The episode ends during Pops' birthday party as Joya and Kenya talk about white gaze'.
3	"still...because of slavery"	Rashida Jones	Esa Lewis & Helen Krieger	April 17, 2020
4	"yup, you guessed it. again, this is because of slavery"	Ken Kwapis	Doug Hall	April 17, 2020
5	"yo, between you and me... this is because of slavery"	Kenya Barris	Hale Rothstein	April 17, 2020
6	"hard to believe, but still because of slavery"	Kenya Barris	Alison McDonald	April 17, 2020
7	"i know this is going to sound crazy... but this, too, is because of slavery"	Brennan Schroff	Hunter Covington	April 17, 2020
8	"i know you may not get this, but the reason we deserve a vacation is... because of slavery"	Brennan Schroff	Danny Segal & Isaac Schamis	April 17, 2020

== Production ==
=== Development ===
Netflix ordered #blackAF (originally titled Black Excellence) as the first series under Barris' deal with them. Announcing the production of the show, Netflix said, "Inspired by Barris' irreverent, highly flawed, unbelievably honest approach to parenting, relationships, race, and culture, Black Excellence looks to pull the curtain back and reboot the 'family sitcom' in a way we've never seen before." On June 23, 2020, Netflix renewed the series for a second season. A year later, on June 23, 2021, the renewal decision was reversed and the series was canceled after one season, but may return as a standalone film franchise.

=== Casting ===
On May 10, 2019, Kenya Barris and Rashida Jones were cast in starring roles. On December 20, 2019, Genneya Walton, Iman Benson, Scarlet Spencer, Justin Claiborn, Ravi Cabot-Conyers, and Richard Gardenhire Jr. were announced as additional cast members.

== Reception ==
On Rotten Tomatoes, the series has an approval rating of 46% based on 24 reviews, with an average rating of 6.97/10. The website's critical consensus states: "Solid one-liners and some sharp social critiques can't save #blackaf from feeling more like a stale retread than a fresh step forward for creator Kenya Barris." On Metacritic, it has a weighted average score of 61 out of 100, based on 18 critics, indicating "generally favorable reviews".
