= Kevin Kopelow and Heath Seifert =

American television producers and writers duo

- Born: Kevin Kopelow: June 28, 1963 (age 63); Los Angeles, California, U.S. Heath Seifert: 1968 (age 55–56); Los Angeles, California, U.S.
- Occupations: Kevin Kopelow: Actor, screenwriter, television producer Heath Seifert: Screenwriter, television producer

Kevin M. Kopelow (born June 28, 1963 in Los Angeles, California) and Heath Seifert (born 1968 in Los Angeles, California) are an American television writing and producing team. They have written and produced All That, Kenan & Kel, and Cousins for Life for Nickelodeon and Austin & Ally for Disney Channel, among other series. They also created the latter two.

As an actor, Kopelow is best known for appearing as Kevin, the stage manager on All That, as well as appearing as a panelist on the game show Figure It Out.

== Filmography ==
=== Writers ===
- Good Burger 2 (2023)
- Warped! (2021, also creators)
- Cousins for Life (2018–2019, also creators)
- Nickelodeon's Ho Ho Holiday Special (2015)
- Austin & Ally (2011–2016, also creators)
- Star and Stella Save the World (2007)
- All That 10th Anniversary Reunion Special (2005)
- Stripperella (2003–2004) (also creators)
- 100 Deeds for Eddie McDowd (2002)
- KaBlam! (1996–1998)
- Kenan & Kel (1996–2000)
- All That (1994–2000, 2019–2020)
- Two Heads Are Better Than None (2000)
- 1999 Kids' Choice Awards (1999)
- Good Burger (1997)
- Space Cases (1996)
- Singled Out (1995)

=== Producers ===
- Good Burger 2 (2023)
- Warped! (2021)
- Cousins for Life (2018–2019, also writers)
- Austin & Ally (2011–2016, also writers)
- Jonas (2009)
- Sonny with a Chance (2009)
- Campus Ladies (2006–2007)
- Star and Stella Save the World (2007)
- Hi-Jinks (2005–2006)
- Stripperella (2003)
- Kenan & Kel (1996–2000)
- All That (1994–2005, 2019–2020)
- Cousin Skeeter (1998–2001)
- Good Burger (1997)

=== Kopelow as an actor ===
- All That (1994–2005, 2019–2020) - Kevin the Stage Manager (Seasons 1-6, 1995-2000)
- Kenan & Kel (1996–2000) - Paramedic #2, Party Decorator
- Good Burger (1997) - Sad Clown
- Figure It Out (1997–1999) - Himself/panelist
