= Iman Benson =

American actress

- Occupation: Actress
- Years active: 2016–present

Iman Benson is an American actress best known for her roles in Uncle Buck, Alexa & Katie, BlackAF, and The Midnight Club.

== Career ==
Benson's career began in 2016, where she starred in the Mike Epps-led ABC sitcom Uncle Buck. From 2018 to 2020, she had a recurring role in the Netflix teen sitcom Alexa & Katie.

In 2020, Benson starred in the Netflix sitcom BlackAF. She signed with United Talent Agency that same year. She appeared in the Shudder horror anthology series Creepshow in 2021. She had the lead role in The Midnight Club, a Netflix horror series created by Mike Flanagan. In 2025, she starred in the sci-fi film War of the Worlds, based on the 1898 novel by H. G. Wells.

== Filmography ==
=== Film ===
Year	Name	Role	Notes
2023	Candy Cane Lane	Selah	
2025	War of the Worlds	Faith Radford	
2025	Swiped	Elena	

=== Television ===
Year	Name	Role	Notes
2016	Uncle Buck	Tia Russell	8 episodes
2018	Station 19	Dallas	Episode: "Contain the Flame"
2018–2019	Suits	Joy Williams	Episodes: "Good Mudding" and "Windmills"
2018–2020	Alexa & Katie	Reagan	Recurring role, 22 episodes
2020	BlackAF	Drea Barris	Main role
2021	Creepshow	Morgue	Episode: "Dead & Breakfast / Pesticide"
2022	The Midnight Club	Ilonka	Main role
2026	Sweet Magnolias	Jessica Whitley	Recurring Role, 7 episodes
