= Kevin Kay =

American television executive

Kevin Kay is an American television executive. A native of New Jersey, he began his career at NBC's Rockefeller Center studios in New York City working on Jeopardy! and The Tonight Show before joining Saturday Night Live and ultimately Late Night with David Letterman. After stints with WOR-TV and HBO Downtown Productions, he joined MTV Networks where he initially oversaw Nickelodeon, Nick at Nite and TV Land. He then moved over to TNN, which he became president of after it was renamed Spike TV. Kay is responsible for launching The Ultimate Fighter on Spike TV, SpongeBob SquarePants on Nickelodeon, and Lip Sync Battle, Ink Master, Bar Rescue and Bellator MMA on Spike as well as developing, greenlighting and launching Yellowstone on Paramount Network. He also served as president of TV Land and CMT and is currently President of DJKay Entertainment which most recently produced 33 episodes of All That and 13 episodes of the sitcom Warped for Nickelodeon.

== Sources ==
- TV Week: Kay Promoted
- Variety: Kay
- Earth Times: King of All Men
