= Greatest Hits (Hi-Five album) =

Hi-Five's Greatest Hits

Compilation album by Hi-Five
- Released: October 11, 1994
- Recorded: 1989–1994
- Genre: R&B; new jack swing; hip hop soul
- Length: 56:45
- Label: Jive

Hi-Five chronology
Faithful (1993)	Hi-Five's Greatest Hits (1994)	The Return (2005)

Hi-Five's Greatest Hits is the first greatest hits album by American group Hi-Five. It was released October 11, 1994 on Jive Records, shortly after the group's disbandment. It consists of hit singles from their first three albums released from 1990 to 1994.

== Track listing ==
No.	Title	Writer(s)	Original album	Length
1.	"I Like the Way (The Kissing Game)"	Teddy Riley; Bernard Belle; Dave Way	Hi-Five (1990)	5:49
2.	"She's Playing Hard to Get"	William Walton; Timmy Allen	Keep It Goin' On (1992)	4:35
3.	"I Can't Wait Another Minute"	Eric Foster White	Hi-Five	5:01
4.	"I Just Can't Handle It"	Teddy Riley; Bernard Belle	Hi-Five	4:28
5.	"Quality Time"	Robert Sylvester Kelly	Keep It Goin On	4:42
6.	"Never Should've Let You Go"	Eric Foster White	Faithful (1993) & Sister Act 2: Back in the Habit Soundtrack (1993)	4:42
7.	"What Can I Say To You (To Justify My Love)" (featuring Nuttin' Nyce)	Tiwando Lovelace; LaTeece Wallace; Larry Campbell	Faithful	4:27
8.	"Unconditional Love"	Larry Campbell	Faithful & Menace II Society Soundtrack (1993)	5:02
9.	"Birthday Girl"	Larry Campbell	A Low Down Dirty Shame Soundtrack (1994)	3:37
10.	"What Are You Doin' Tonight"	Eric Foster White	New song	4:16
11.	"That Was Then, This Is Now"	Larry Campbell	New song	5:07
12.	"She Said"	Timmy Allen; Damon Miley; Sonia Allen	Keep It Goin' On	4:59
Total length:				56:45
