= Sexsational (Tony Thompson album) =

Studio album by Tony Thompson
- Released: June 23, 1995
- Studio: Various: Axis Recording Studios; Battery Studios; Electric Lady Studios; The Hit Factory; Unique Recording Studios (New York); Future Recording Studios (Virginia Beach, Virginia); The Tracken Place (Los Angeles, California)
- Genre: R&B
- Length: 50:23
- Label: Giant
- Producer: Babyface; Jeffrey Bowens (exec.); Sean "Puffy" Combs; Charles Farrar; Reggie Griffin; Dave Hollister; Jon-John; Jerome Jefferson; Jonathan C. Kinloch (exec.); Maurice Pearl; Darryl Pearson; Teddy Riley; Al B. Sure; DeVante Swing; The Characters; Joe Thomas; Tony Thompson (also exec.)

Tony Thompson chronology
Hi-Five's Greatest Hits (1994)	Sexsational (1995)

Singles from Sexsational
- 1. "I Wanna Love Like That" Released: March 28, 1995; 2. "Handle Our Business" Released: May 23, 1995; 3. "Dance With Me" Released: 1995

Sexsational is the only solo album by American R&B singer Tony Thompson of the group Hi-Five. It was released June 23, 1995, on Giant Records. The album spawned two singles, one of which, the top 20 R&B hit "I Wanna Love Like That", became his highest-charting sole appearance on the US Billboard Hot 100 chart, peaking inside the top sixty, where it reached #59 on that chart.

== Critical reception ==
Professional ratings
Review scores
Source	Rating
AllMusic	3/5 stars

Sexsational received positive reviews, particularly praise for Thompson's vocals, but was criticized for the album's weak material, with Stephen Thomas Erlewine of AllMusic, writing, "when given the right material, Thompson is convincing, but he isn't powerful enough to rescue weak songs." and awarded the album three out of five stars.

== Chart performance ==
The album charted within the top 100 of the US Billboard 200, peaking at number ninety-nine. It fared better on the US Top R&B/Hip-Hop Albums chart, where it peaked inside the top twenty of that chart, peaking number seventeen.

== Track listing ==
No.	Title	Writer(s)	Producer(s)	Length
1.	"I Know"	Mary J. Blige; Tony Dofat; Faith Evans	Sean "Puffy" Combs	4:43
2.	"What's Goin' On"	Evans	Combs	4:17
3.	"I Wanna Love Like That"	Babyface Teddy Riley	Jon-John; Reggie Griffin; Teddy Riley	5:07
4.	"Sweat"	Albert Joseph Brown III; Maurice Pearl	Al B. Sure!; Maurice Pearl	4:06
5.	"Handle Our Business"	Dave Hollister; Chris "Lil' Chris" Smith	Hollister; Smith^{[a]}; Jerome Jefferson^{[a]}	4:28
6.	"My Cherie Amour"	Henry Cosby; Sylvia Moy; Stevie Wonder	The Characters	3:45
7.	"Come Over"	Charles Farrar; Troy Taylor; Carl Thomas; Debbie Thomas	The Characters	5:08
8.	"Dance With Me"	Babyface	Jon-John; Griffin	4:51
9.	"Goodbye Eyes"	Farrar; Taylor	The Characters	4:39
10.	"Slave"	Melissa Elliott; Darryl Pearson; DeVante Swing	Pearson; Swing	4:59
11.	"Break It Down"	Joe Thomas; Michelle Williams	Joe	4:20

European and Japanese edition bonus track
No.	Title	Writer(s)	Producer(s)	Length
12.	"Touch Me"	Big Bub & Tom Jefferson	Jerome "Rome" Jefferson	4:08

Notes

- ^{^a} denotes co-producer

== Personnel ==
- Tony Thompson: Vocals, Background Vocals, Primary Artist
- Al B. Sure!: Composer, Engineer, Producer
- Babyface: Composer
- Dave Hollister: Producer, Composer, Background Vocalist
- Teddy Riley: Keyboards, Guest Artist, Composer, Programming
- DeVante Swing: Composer, Producer, Background Vocalist
- Missy Elliott: Background Vocalist
- Mary J. Blige: Background Vocals
- Faith Evans: Guest Artist, Background Vocals
- Joe: Composer, Producer, Background Vocals

== Charts ==
Chart (1995)	Peak position
US Billboard 200	99
US Top R&B/Hip-Hop Albums (Billboard)	17
