= 3rd Avenue (American band) =

American contemporary R&B group

- 3rd Avenue Album Photoshoot

Background information
- Also known as: 3rd Ave
- Origin: Baton Rouge, Louisiana, United States
- Genres: R&B, quiet storm, new jack swing, soul
- Years active: 1990–1993
- Labels: SOLAR Records; Epic Records (Former)
- Past members: Maurice "Moe-P" Pearl (deceased); Eric Jason Robinson; Brad Nelson

3rd Avenue, composed of Maurice "Moe-P" Pearl, Eric Jason Robinson, and Brad Nelson, were an American trio of R&B vocalists signed to SOLAR Records (Sound of Los Angeles Records), a Los Angeles-based label built from the existing roster of the former Soul Train Records founded by Don Cornelius.

== History ==
=== Beginnings and initial group success ===
3rd Avenue, originally from Baton Rouge, Louisiana, gained recognition when Pabst Brewing Company contracted the group to perform commercial jingles for Olde English 800, a brand of malted liquor marketed towards the "urban contemporary market". The resulting exposure from the commercials led to the group signing a recording contract with SOLAR, who had recently signed a distribution agreement with Epic Records as their previous distribution deal lapsed in 1989. "The Minute You Fall In Love", a record from their upcoming debut album, was placed onto the Billboard R&B Albums Chart Top 10-peaking Deep Cover Soundtrack, distributed by SOLAR/Epic and released in early 1992. The group's label debut was deemed a "priority project" by SOLAR executives in a June 1992 Billboard article alongside the launch of Times 3, a female R&B trio, and 3rd Avenue members Pearl and Robinson co-wrote portions of the project alongside producer Dennis "Den Den" Nelson. Their debut album Let's Talk About Love was released in June 1992. The parent album underperformed as it did not chart at a time in which the new jack swing genre was at its creative peak, but the singles fared better and received national R&B airplay without the aid of music videos, peaking at #66 and #58 respectively. Lead single "I’ve Gotta Have It" remained on the Billboard Hot R&B Songs chart for 7 weeks, and the second single, a remixed version of the title track, lasted 6 weeks.

=== SOLAR decline and group dissolution ===
In 1993, the members of 3rd Avenue co-wrote and/or produced "Baby, I'm Hooked on You", "My Love for You Will Last Forever", and "Are You Ready To Be Loved?" for SOLAR labelmate and Cincinnati-based R&B Group The Deele's final 1993 album An Invitation To Love. Robinson also co-wrote album track "Feel It" alongside Vincent Herbert and SOLAR writer Tania Carmenatti. An Invitation To Love, a foray into a more hip-hop-influenced, new jack swing style without original members Kevin Roberson, Kenneth Edmonds and Antonio Reid, was a commercial disappointment. As a result, Epic did not renew their SOLAR distribution deal, causing the label to cease operations in early 1994. 3rd Avenue disbanded soon after.

Over the next two decades, the SOLAR catalog was purchased and sold by various companies (including label The Right Stuff Records in 1996), with Canadian independent record label Unidisc gaining control in 2009. Fragments of "Freak Me" and "Wiggle It", the two tracks that did not make 3rd Avenue's debut album, were leaked onto YouTube in 2018. 3rd Avenue's debut album, along with the catalogs of many of their SOLAR labelmates, was re-released to various music streaming channels in January 2019 as a condition of a new shared global ownership agreement with BMG Rights Management. This resulted in the issuance of a deluxe version of Let's Talk About Love, attaching all of the various mixes from both singles to the parent project for the first time.

== Solo Careers ==
Pearl continued writing and producing for other artists, including "Don't Let It Slip Away" for R&B group Groove U's 1994 album Tender Love, "Sweat" for Hi-Five member Tony Thompson's 1995 solo album Sexsational, lead single "I Do!" for Dean Phil's shelved 1997 album Personal, and "What's Really Going On (Strange Fruit)" for Tony! Toni! Toné! member D'wayne Wiggins' 2000 solo album Eyes Never Lie. He has also written or produced for Johnny Gill, Harold Travis, Big Cee, and Smoothe Sylk. In 2002, Pearl released Lost Inside, a solo R&B/Hip-Hop album under the name Moe-P on MoSound Records, and the project was finally released to streaming platforms in March 2025 after he signed a deal with Bungalo / Universal Music Group under his Pearl Sounds Music Group imprint. In 2009, Pearl co-wrote "Only You!" and produced "Lady in My Life" from Al B. Sure!'s 2009 album Honey I'm Home. He died in Baton Rouge on September 14, 2025, the day of his 55th birthday.

== Discography ==
=== Albums ===
Let's Talk About Love (1992)

=== Singles ===
List of singles, as a lead artist, with selected chart positions, showing year released and album name
Title	Year	Peak chart positions	Ref	Certifications	Album
Title	Year	US R&B	Ref	Certifications	Album
"I've Gotta Have It"	1992	66			Let's Talk About Love
"Let's Talk About Love (Remix)"	1992	58			Let's Talk About Love

=== Guest appearances ===
List of guest appearances, showing year released and album name
Title	Year	Album
"The Minute You Fall In Love"	1992	Deep Cover soundtrack
