= Unconditional love (disambiguation) =

Unconditional love is a concept relating to love.

Unconditional love may also refer to:

== Film and television ==
- Unconditional Love (2002 film), an American comedy film directed by P.J. Hogan
- Unconditional Love (2003 film), a British television drama film that aired on ITV

== Albums ==
- Unconditional Love (Glen Campbell album), 1991
- Unconditional Love (Peabo Bryson album), 1999
- Unconditional Love (Lemonescent album), 2003
- Unconditional Love (Mai Kuraki album), 2021
- Unconditional Love, a 2014 album by Ruben Studdard

== Songs ==
- "Unconditional Love" (Hi-Five song), a 1993 song by Hi-Five
- "Unconditional Love", a 1989 song by Cyndi Lauper from the album A Night to Remember
- "Unconditional Love" (Donna Summer song), a 1983 song by Donna Summer
- "Unconditional Love" (Tupac Shakur song), a 1998 song by Tupac Shakur and M.C. Hammer
- "Unconditional Love" (Against Me! song), a 2014 song by Against Me!
- "Big Mama (Unconditional Love)", a song by LL Cool J from 10
