= Keep It Goin' On =

Studio album by Hi-Five
- Released: August 11, 1992
- Recorded: October 1991–April 1992
- Genre: R&B, new jack swing, soul
- Length: 42:13
- Label: Jive
- Producer: Timmy Allen, R. Kelly, Vincent Herbert, Kiyamma Griffin, Eric Foster White, Carl Bourelly

Hi-Five chronology
Hi-Five (1990)	Keep It Goin' On (1992)	Faithful (1993)

Singles from Keep It Goin' On
- 1. "She's Playing Hard to Get" Released: July 15, 1992; 2. "Quality Time" Released: November 6, 1992; 3. "Mary, Mary" Released: 1993

Keep It Goin' On is the second studio album by the American band Hi-Five. It was released on August 11, 1992, by Jive Records. The lead single "She's Playing Hard to Get" peaked at number five on the Billboard Hot 100 and number two on the R&B singles chart. It is the second studio album featuring the teen frontman lead singer Tony Thompson who propelled this album into platinum status. It also features the first appearance of the Bronx, New York native, Treston Irby. These singles from their previous album, featuring Irby include: "I Can't Wait Another Minute", "I Like the Way (The Kissing Game)", and the remix version of "Just Another Girlfriend". Keep It Goin' On is the final album to include the original members Roderick "Pooh" Clark (who was paralyzed from the chest down due to an accidental highway car crash shortly after the second album's release) and Russell Neal (who shortly left the group due to financial conflicts).

== Background ==
"She's Playing Hard to Get" is the first single from this album. The single peaked at number five on the Billboard Hot 100 and number two on the R&B singles chart. The album is notable for featuring the first recorded appearance of singer Faith Evans, who made her debut as a background singer on the song "She Said".

== Track listing ==
No.	Title	Writer(s)	Length
1.	"She's Playing Hard to Get"	Timmy Allen, William Walton	4:35
2.	"Quality Time"	R. Kelly	4:42
3.	"She Said"	Daymin Miley, Sonia Allen, Timmy Allen	4:58
4.	"Fly Away"	Vincent Herbert, Kiyamma Griffin	5:39
5.	"A Little Bit Older Now"	R. Kelly	4:45
6.	"Mary, Mary"	Eric Foster White	4:17
7.	"Let's Get It Started (Keep It Goin' On)"	R. Kelly	4:32
8.	"Video Girl"	R. Kelly	4:12
9.	"Whenever You Say"	Carl Bourelly, William Walton	5:01

== Personnel ==
Hi-Five

- Tony Thompson – lead vocals, harmony, and backing vocals
- Roderick Clark – harmony and backing vocals
- Marcus Sanders – harmony and backing vocals
- Treston Irby – harmony and backing vocals
- Russell Neal – harmony and backing vocals

Additional singers

- R. Kelly – programming, background vocals, producer
- Jose Fernandez – programming
- Ike Lee – programming
- Timmy Allen – instruments, producer
- Joshua Grau – guitar
- Eric Foster White – drum programming, bass, keyboards, recording engineer
- Kevin Johnson – drums
- D-Nice – additional drum programming
- Carl Bourelly – keyboards, producer
- Jean-Paul Bourelly – guitar
- Faith Evans – background vocals
- Roz Davis – background vocals
- Schon-Jomel Crawford – background vocals
- Ed Calle – trumpet
- Brett Murphey – saxophone
- Lee Levin – drums
- Little Anthony Carr – background vocals
- Tony Thompson – background vocals
- Thoudia Bickham – background vocals
- Dawn Green – background vocals
- Daymin Miley – background vocals, songwriter
- Peter Mokran – mixing
- Chris Trevett – mixing
- Anthony Saunders – recording engineer
- Pete Christensen – recording engineer
- Ben Garrison – recording engineer, mixing
- Jim Munn – recording engineer
- Kerry Craston – recording engineer
- Tim Latham – recording engineer
- Will Tartak – recording engineer
- Tom Vercillo – recording engineer
- Tom Coyne – mastering
- June Ambrose – styling
- Hula – additional production, remix
- K. Fingers – additional production, remix
- Gary Spector – photography
- ZombArt JK – design

== Charts ==
=== Weekly charts ===
Chart (1992)	Peak position
US Billboard 200	82
US Top R&B/Hip-Hop Albums (Billboard)	9

=== Year-end charts ===
Chart (1992)	Position
US Top R&B/Hip-Hop Albums (Billboard)	68

== Release history ==
- Keep It Goin' On (Jive)
- Greatest Hits (Jive)
- Club Mix '98, Vol. 2 (Cold Front Records / K-Tel Distribution)
- Kool Hits of 80's (Avex Trax)
- Let It Rock 1993 (Direct Source)
- Body and Soul: Smooth Jams (Time/Life Music)
- I Like the Way (The Kissing Game) (Sony CMG)
- Pop Hits of the 90s (BMG Special Products)
- Pop Hits of the 90s [#2] (BMG Special Products)
- Pure Swing [Universal 2013] (Universal Music)
