= Sarah Cassidy =

Sarah Cassidy may refer to:

- Sarah Cassidy, character in Panic (2000 film)
- Sarah Cassidy, character in House at the End of the Street
- Sarah Cassidy, member of Lemonescent band
