= Marcus Nispel =

German film director (born 1963)

- Born: 26 May 1963 (age 63); Frankfurt, West Germany
- Occupations: Film director, producer
- Years active: 1990–2021

Marcus Nispel (born 26 May 1963) is a German retired film director and producer, best known for several high-profile American horror remakes, including The Texas Chainsaw Massacre (2003) and Friday the 13th (2009). He also directed various television commercials and music videos, including C+C Music Factory's "Gonna Make You Sweat (Everybody Dance Now)" and "Things That Make You Go Hmmm...", Janet Jackson's "Runaway", Fugees' "Ready or Not", and the Spice Girls' "Spice Up Your Life".

== Early life and career ==
Nispel was born on 26 May 1963 in Frankfurt. He grew up near McNair Barracks and was able to learn English from hanging out with children of soldiers. At the age of 15, he got a job at a boutique called Hessler and Kehrer. When he had his first interview at an American ad agency, he was asked what do Oreos mean, and he realized the importance of understanding American culture, and how working in advertising helped him understand that. He received a Fulbright Scholarship at the age of 20 and attended Brooklyn College and New York Institute of Technology. He was also an art director for Young & Rubicam. He started a production company, Portfolio Artists Network which later merged with RSA (Ridley Scott Associates) Black Dog Films to form Portfolio/Black Dog. He worked at RSA as a commercial director for several years, resigning in 2000.

== Feature career ==
Nispel was set to make his feature directorial debut with End of Days, but stepped down before shooting due to issues with the budget. In 2002, Nispel signed on to direct The Texas Chainsaw Massacre. He was initially opposed to remaking the film, but Daniel Pearl, the cinematographer for the original film and regular collaborator with Nispel, convinced him to direct. The film was released on October 17, 2003 to negative reviews but was financially successful, grossing $107 million worldwide.

Throughout the 2000s and into the 2010s, Nispel would direct several more remakes and reboots of prominent genre films, such as Friday the 13th (reuniting him with Platinum Dunes, who made Texas Chainsaw) and Conan the Barbarian. In 2015, Nispel directed the ghost exorcism film Exeter, formerly titled Backmask.

== Unrealized projects ==
- The 59-Story Crisis, a film about the Citicorp Center engineering crisis for Interscope Communications.
- S.W.A.T.
- Full Contact, a remake of the Hong Kong film for New Line Cinema.
- End of Days
- The Expendables, an action film written by Scott Marshall Smith and Scott Rosenberg for Warner Bros. Pictures.
- Need, a psychological thriller starring Diane Lane for Paramount Pictures and Escape Artists. He picked the film as he wanted something 'diametrically opposed to TCM'.
- Alice, a film adaptation of American McGee's Alice for Universal Pictures.
- The Last Voyage of the Demeter
- Hack/Slash, a film adaptation of the horror-action comic book for Relativity Media.
- Stowaway, a seafaring horror-thriller based on a story by Nispel.

== Personal life ==
He is married to singer/songwriter/commercial and music video editor Dyan Humes-Nispel who has written songs for various artists including Whitney Houston. They have two children.

== Filmography ==
Film

Year	Title	Director	Producer	Notes
2003	The Texas Chainsaw Massacre	Yes	No	
2004	Frankenstein	Yes	Yes	TV movie
2007	Pathfinder	Yes	Yes	
2009	Friday the 13th	Yes	No	
2011	Conan the Barbarian	Yes	No	
2015	Exeter	Yes	Yes	Also story writer

Trailer

- "Regenerate", a teaser trailer for Resident Evil: Apocalypse (2004).

Documentary appearances

- His Name Was Jason: 30 Years of Friday the 13th (2009)
- Crystal Lake Memories: The Complete History of Friday the 13th (2013)

== Videography ==
1990

- Al B. Sure! – "Had Enuf"
- Curtis Mayfield featuring Ice-T – "Superfly 1990"
- Olé Olé – "Love Crusaders"
- Olé Olé – "How Can I Believe You"

1991

- C+C Music Factory – "Gonna Make You Sweat (Everybody Dance Now)"
- C+C Music Factory – "Things That Make You Go Hmmm..."
- C+C Music Factory – "Here We Go (Let's Rock & Roll)"
- Divinyls – "Love School"
- Inner City – "Till We Meet Again"
- Joe Jackson – "Obvious Song"
- Lisa Lisa and Cult Jam – "Let the Beat Hit 'Em"
- LL Cool J – "6 Minutes of Pleasure"
- Mantronix – "Don't Go Messin' with My Heart"
- Mariah Carey – "Make It Happen"
- Nia Peeples – "Street of Dreams"

1992

- Faith No More – "A Small Victory"
- Lisa Stansfield – "Someday (I'm Coming Back)"
- Martha Wash – "Give It to You"
- Trey Lorenz – "Photograph of Mary"
- Clivillés & Cole – "Pride (In The Name Of Love)"

1993

- George Michael – "Killer" / "Papa Was a Rollin' Stone"
- The B-52's – "Good Stuff"
- Billy Joel – "Lullabye (Goodnight, My Angel)"
- Eternal – "Stay"
- Hi-Five – "Unconditional Love"
- Pauline Henry – "Feel Like Makin' Love"
- Hi-Five – "Never Should've Let You Go"
- Go West – "Tracks of My Tears"
- OMD – "Stand Above Me"

1994

- All-4-One – "I Swear"
- Crystal Waters – "100% Pure Love"
- Fu-Schnickens – "Breakdown"
- Gloria Estefan – "Turn the Beat Around"
- Amy Grant – "House of Love"
- Jade – "Every Day of the Week"
- Tevin Campbell – "I'm Ready"
- Wet Wet Wet – "Love Is All Around"

1995

- Jimmy Somerville – "Heartbeat"
- Bette Midler – "To Deserve You"
- Janet Jackson – "Runaway"
- Mylène Farmer – "XXL"
- Mylène Farmer – "L'Instant X"
- Elton John – "Believe"
- No Doubt – "Spiderwebs"
- Reacharound — "Big Chair"

1996

- Scorpions – "You and I"
- Fugees – "Ready or Not"
- Lil' Kim featuring Puff Daddy – "No Time"
- Mylène Farmer – "Comme j'ai mal"
- Luis Miguel – "Dame"
- Herbert Grönemeyer – "Bochum" (live)

1997

- Elton John – "Recover Your Soul"
- Spice Girls – "Spice Up Your Life"
- Bush – "Greedy Fly"

1998

- Puff Daddy & the Family featuring the Notorious B.I.G. and Busta Rhymes – "Victory"
- Sunz of Man featuring Ol' Dirty Bastard and Earth, Wind & Fire – "Shining Star"
- Bryan Adams featuring Melanie C – "When You're Gone"

1999

- Terror Squad – "Whatcha Gon' Do"
- Mylène Farmer – "Souviens-toi du jour"
- Bryan Adams – "Cloud Number Nine"
- Nobody's Angel – "If You Wanna Dance"
- Paradise Lost – "So Much Is Lost"

2000

- The Mighty Mighty Bosstones – "So Sad to Say"
- Ronan Keating – "Life Is a Rollercoaster"

2001

- The Charlatans – "Love Is the Key"

2006

- Kyosuke Himuro – "Sweet Revolution"
