= Let's Talk About Love (3rd Avenue album) =

Studio album by 3rd Avenue
- Released: June 9, 1992
- Recorded: 1991–1992
- Studio: Axis Studio (New York, New York); Studio Masters (Los Angeles, California); Westlake, Cherokee, Galaxy Sound and M'Bila Studios, (Hollywood, California)
- Genre: R&B; new jack swing; soul
- Length: 53:12
- Label: SOLAR; Epic Records; Sony
- Producer: The Characters; Dennis "Den Den" Nelson; Rickey "Freeze" Smith; Maurice Pearl

Singles from Let's Talk About Love
- 1. "I've Gotta Have It" Released: May 1992; 2. "Let's Talk About Love (Remix)" Released: June 1992

Let's Talk About Love is 3rd Avenue's debut album released by SOLAR/Epic Records, and remains their sole album as a group. Primarily new jack swing with subtle elements of synth and funk, the album was released in the twilight years of the label, and was one of the last SOLAR albums to receive a full release. Lead single "I've Gotta Have It" remained on the Billboard Hot R&B Singles chart for seven weeks, peaking at No. 66, and the second single, a remixed version of the title track, lasted six weeks, peaking at No. 58.

== Background ==
In June 1992, the group's label debut was deemed a "priority project" by SOLAR executives in a Billboard article, and 3rd Avenue members Maurice Pearl and Eric Robinson were given the opportunity to co-write portions of the project alongside producer Dennis "Den Den" Nelson.

Other than two contributions from notable Boyz II Men and SWV production team The Characters, most work on the album was completed in-house at SOLAR, with frequent SOLAR writers Tania Carmenatti, Dennis "Den Den" Nelson, Dynasty member William Shelby, The Time member Ricky Darnell "Freeze" Smith, and Johnny Thomas Jr. (among others) providing songwriting and production alongside group members Pearl and Robinson.

=== Promotional activities ===
"The Minute You Fall in Love", a record from their upcoming debut album, was placed onto the Billboard R&B Albums Chart top 10-peaking Deep Cover Soundtrack, distributed by SOLAR/Epic and released in April 1992.

== Track listing ==
The track listing, writing credits and other album information are courtesy of the album packaging and Billboard.

Additionally, Robinson, Pearl, and Dennis Nelson co-wrote two outtakes from the album that appeared on an initial Wilder Brothers Recording Studio cassette pressing: "Freak Me" and "Wiggle It".

Standard edition
No.	Title	Writer(s)	Producer(s)	Length
1.	"I've Gotta Have It"	Troy Taylor	The Characters	4:47
2.	"The Minute You Fall in Love"	Taylor; Tony Cardoza	The Characters	5:29
3.	"Another Lover"	Dennis Nelson; Ken Williams; Rio Lawrence; Tania Carmenatti	Dennis "Den Den" Nelson	4:01
4.	"Sneakin' in the Alley with Sally"	Nelson; Eric Robinson; Maurice Pearl	Dennis "Den-Den" Nelson	4:45
5.	"Annie's Apple Pie"	Johnny Thomas Jr.; Paul Laster; Ricardo "T.R.A.C.E." Luis Viera; Carmenatti	Dennis "Den-Den" Nelson	4:25
6.	"Let's Take Our Time"	Nelson; Robinson; Jeff Mays; Pearl	Dennis "Den-Den" Nelson	5:03
7.	"Let's Talk About Love" (remix)	Undrea Carlett Martin; Nelson; Robinson; Pearl	Dennis "Den-Den" Nelson	4:25
8.	"Playing the Fool"	Karin Patterson; Ricky Darnell Smith; Will Shelby	Rickey "Freeze" Smith	5:41
9.	"Show Me"	Pearl; Roderick Smith; Carmenatti	Dennis "Den-Den" Nelson	4:34
10.	"Love Me Just a Little Bit More"	Nelson; Pearl; Carmenatti	Dennis "Den-Den" Nelson	4:22
11.	"One Kiss"	Nelson; Robinson; Pearl	Dennis "Den-Den" Nelson; Pearl	5:20
Total length:				53:12

2019 Unidisc deluxe edition
No.	Title	Writer(s)	Producer(s)	Length
12.	"I've Gotta Have It" (12" Remix)	Taylor	The Characters	5:37
13.	"I've Gotta Have It" (Smooth Characters Mix)	Taylor	The Characters	4:53
14.	"I've Gotta Have It" (Go for Your Mix)	Taylor	The Characters	3:40
15.	"I've Gotta Have It" (Bonus Beats)	Taylor	The Characters	2:21
16.	"Let's Talk About Love" (Original Mix)	Martin; Nelson; Robinson; Pearl	The Characters	4:21
17.	"Let's Talk About Love" (Instrumental)	Martin; Nelson; Robinson; Pearl	Dennis "Den-Den" Nelson	4:25
Total length:				78:29

Unreleased tracks (appeared on a 1992 demo cassette pressing, and later leaked to YouTube)
No.	Title	Writer(s)	Producer(s)	Length
4.	"Freak Me"	Nelson; Robinson; Pearl	Dennis "Den-Den" Nelson
6.	"Wiggle It"	Nelson; Robinson; Pearl	Dennis "Den-Den" Nelson

=== Singles ===
List of singles, as a lead artist, with selected chart positions, showing year released and album name
Title	Year	Peak chart positions	Ref	Certifications
Title	Year	US R&B	Ref	Certifications
"I've Gotta Have It"	1992	66		
"Let's Talk About Love (Remix)"	1992	58		

== Legacy ==
The album underperformed amongst a wave of successful new jack swing albums, as the label was in obvious decline and unable to provide promotional opportunities, with SOLAR losing distribution and becoming insolvent in 1994. Over the next two decades, the SOLAR catalog was purchased and sold by various companies (including label The Right Stuff Records in 1996), with Canadian independent record label Unidisc gaining control in 2009. 3rd Avenue's debut album, along with the catalogs of many of their SOLAR labelmates, was re-released to various music streaming channels in January 2019 as a condition of a new shared global ownership agreement with BMG Rights Management. A deluxe version of Let's Talk About Love was issued, attaching all of the various mixes from both singles to the parent project for the first time.

Acquiring firm Unidisc noted on their 2019 album re-release inscription that the utilization of "soft electronic samples [hearkening back to SOLAR's disco roots] is what set this album apart from other R&B projects at the time."
