= Hi-Five (album) =

Studio album by Hi-Five
- Released: September 25, 1990
- Recorded: November 1989–May 1990
- Genres: Teen pop, new jack swing, hip hop, R&B
- Length: 51:39
- Label: Jive
- Producers: Teddy Riley, Bernard Belle, Eric Foster White, Dave Way, Alvin Moody, Vincent Bell, Carl Bourelly, Kevin Johnson, Frankie Smith, William Walton

Hi-Five chronology
Hi-Five (1990)	Keep It Goin' On (1992)

Singles from Hi-Five
- 1. "I Just Can't Handle It" Released: November 7, 1990; 2. "I Like the Way (The Kissing Game)" Released: January 2, 1991; 3. "I Can't Wait Another Minute" Released: June 1, 1991; 4. "Just Another Girlfriend" Released: July 16, 1991; 5. "Just Another Girlfriend (Remix)" Released: October 1991

Professional ratings
Review scores
Source	Rating
AllMusic	2/5 stars

Hi-Five is the debut album by the American vocal group Hi-Five. Released on September 25, 1990, the album peaked at number 38 on the Billboard 200 albums chart. Driven by the hit singles "I Just Can't Handle It" (R&B number 10), "I Like the Way (The Kissing Game)" (R&B/pop number one), "I Can't Wait Another Minute" (R&B number one, pop number eight), and "Just Another Girlfriend" (R&B number 41), the album received an RIAA gold certification. Also, Hi-Five is the only album to feature original Hi-Five member Toriano Easley, who was arrested for first-degree murder and manslaughter after the album was recorded, but just before it was released. Easley is heard sharing lead vocals on "The Way You Said Goodbye", "Rag Doll", "I Can't Wait Another Minute", and "I Know Love". In the video for "I Can't Wait Another Minute", Easley's replacement Treston Irby lip-syncs Easley's part.

== Background ==
"Too Young" (in a single edit version) appeared on the soundtrack to the 1991 John Singleton film Boyz n the Hood. It is the first recorded appearance of Mobb Deep rapper Prodigy, who was 15 when this song was released, which he revealed in his book My Infamous Life: The Autobiography of Mobb Deep's Prodigy.

With the exception of the fourth single, "Just Another Girlfriend", all of the music videos for the singles from the album were directed by Antoine Fuqua.

== Track listing ==
No.	Title	Writer(s)	Producer(s)	Length
1.	"I Just Can't Handle It"	Bernard Belle, Teddy Riley	Belle, Riley	4:32
2.	"Just Another Girlfriend"	Eric Foster White	White	4:01
3.	"I Like the Way (The Kissing Game)"	Riley, Belle, Dave Way	Riley, Belle, Way	5:49
4.	"Rag Doll"	Alvin Moody	Moody	4:39
5.	"I Can't Wait Another Minute"	White	White	5:03
6.	"Too Young"	Carl & Jean-Paul Bourelly, Roz Davis	Carl & Jean-Paul Bourelly	5:13
7.	"Merry-Go-Round"	Carl Bourelly, Kevin Johnson, Sean Richards	C. Bourelly, Kevin Johnson	5:11
8.	"The Way You Said Goodbye"	White	White	4:41
9.	"Sweetheart"	Bourelly, Bourelly, Richards, Davis,	C. Bourelly	4:09
10.	"I Know Love"	William Walton	Watson, Frankie Smith	3:54
11.	"Just Another Girlfriend (Remix)"	White	White	4:07

- Note: "Just Another Girlfriend (Remix)" was added to later pressings.

== Personnel ==
Hi-Five

- Tony Thompson – lead vocals, harmony and backing vocals
- Roderick Clark – harmony and backing vocals
- Marcus Sanders – harmony and backing vocals
- Toriano Easley – lead vocals, harmony and backing vocals
- Russell Neal – harmony and backing vocals

Additional singers

- Bernard Bell – backing vocals
- Tim Cashion – backing vocals
- Roiz Davis – backing vocals
- Gordon Dukes – backing vocals
- LaGaylia Frazier – backing vocals
- Frederick Gordon – backing vocals
- Dave Hollister – backing vocals
- John James – backing vocals
- Alvin Moody – backing vocals
- Teddy Riley – backing vocals
- Sean LaBreeze – backing vocals

Musicians

- Carl Bourelly – keyboards, drum programming
- William Walton – keyboards, drum programming
- Jean-Paul Bourelly – guitars, keyboards
- Fritz Cadet – guitar
- Josh Grau – guitar
- Frankie Smith – guitar
- Patricia Halligan - guitar
- Vincent Henry – harmonica, saxophone
- Kevin Johnson – keyboards, drums, percussion
- Sean Richards – drum programming
- Eric Foster White – keyboards, drum programming, trombone
- DeVante Swing – mixing

== Charts ==
Chart (1990–1991)	Peak position
Australian Albums (ARIA)	102
United States (Billboard 200)	30
