= Streiht Up Menace =

Single by MC Eiht

from the album Menace II Society (The Original Motion Picture Soundtrack)
- Released: May 31, 1993
- Studio: Trax Recording Studio (Hollywood, California)
- Genre: West Coast hip-hop; gangsta rap
- Length: 4:36
- Label: Jive
- Songwriters: Aaron Tyler; Terry Allen
- Producers: DJ Slip; MC Eiht

MC Eiht singles chronology
"Streiht Up Menace" (1993)	"The Murda Show" (1993)

Menace II Society singles chronology
"Trigga Gots No Heart" (1993)	"Streiht Up Menace" (1993)	"Unconditional Love" (1993)

Music video
- "Streiht Up Menace" on YouTube

"Streiht Up Menace" is a song and the debut solo single by American rapper MC Eiht. It was released on May 31, 1993, through Jive Records as the second single off the soundtrack of 1993 film Menace II Society. Written and produced by Eiht himself together with fellow Compton's Most Wanted groupmate DJ Slip, it peaked at number 72 on the US Billboard Hot 100 and number 46 on the Hot R&B Singles. A remix to the song was also heard in the film, but was not included in the soundtrack album.

The track was later released on the 2001 Compton's Most Wanted compilation album When We Wuz Bangin' 1989–1999: The Hitz and on the 2010 MC Eiht compilation album The Best of MC Eiht. The song is featured in the in-game radio station West Coast Classics in the 2013 video game Grand Theft Auto V.

== Concept ==
The lyrics of the song focuses on the life of the main character in the film, Kaydee "Caine" Lawson (played by Tyrin Turner), acting as a sort of plot summary for the film. Compton's Most Wanted previously used the same concept for the song "Growin' Up in the Hood" from the Boyz n the Hood soundtrack.

The music video depicts MC Eiht alone in a slightly foggy bedroom and also features clips from the movie.

== Legacy ==
Montell Jordan's "Falling" from his 1996 album More... sampled "Streiht Up Menace" as did Kool Savas in his 2009 song "Rapfilm". In 2010, Bruno Mars did a wedding remix of MC Eiht's "Streiht Up Menace" on his debut album Doo-Wops & Hooligans.

There are direct references to this track on the song "M.A.A.D City" by Kendrick Lamar from his album Good Kid, M.A.A.D City which features Eiht himself.

== Track listing ==
No.	Title	Length
1.	"Streiht Up Menace" (street LP version)	4:35
2.	"Streiht Up Menace" (radio LP version)	4:35
3.	"Streiht Up Menace" (LP instrumental)	4:35
4.	"Streiht Up Menace" (street remix)	4:37
5.	"Streiht Up Menace" (radio remix)	4:37
6.	"Streiht Up Menace" (instrumental remix)	4:37

== Personnel ==
- Aaron "MC Eiht" Tyler – songwriter, vocals, producer
- Terry "DJ Slip" Allen – songwriter, producer
- William "Willie Z" Zimmerman – keyboards, saxophone (tracks: 4–6)
- Aaron Connor – recording (tracks: 1–3)
- Mitch Zelezny – recording (tracks: 4–6), mixing
- Tom Coyne – mastering
- Michael Miller – photography

== Charts ==
Chart (1993)	Peak position
US Billboard Hot 100	72
US Hot R&B Singles (Billboard)	46
