= Conrad W. Hall =

American cinematographer

Conrad W. Hall is an American cinematographer and son of the late Oscar-winner Conrad Hall.

== Career ==
He started his career working with his father on several productions throughout the 1990s, including A Civil Action (1998) and American Beauty (1999) as camera operator and director of photography (second unit).

Hall's career as a cinematographer began with the 2002 movie Panic Room, replacing Darius Khondji mid-production.

== Filmography ==
Short film

Year	Title	Director	Notes
1997	The Last Mistress	Salim Nayar	
2005	The Truth	Fred Durst	Documentary short
2019	It Lives Below	Emerson Moore	

Feature film

Year	Title	Director	Notes
2002	Panic Room	David Fincher	Shared credit with Darius Khondji
2002	A Gentleman's Game	J. Mills Goodloe	
2004	The Punisher	Jonathan Hensleigh	
2005	Two for the Money	D. J. Caruso	
2007	Elvis and Anabelle	Will Geiger	
2008	The Longshots	Fred Durst	
2011	Oka!	Lavinia Currier	
2013	Olympus Has Fallen	Antoine Fuqua	
2018	Out of Blue	Carol Morley	
2019	The Fanatic	Fred Durst	
2020	The Sleepover	Trish Sie	
2022	The King's Daughter	Sean McNamara	
TBA	ALEXANDER the GREAT (and Axel Too!)	Constantine Paraskevopoulos	
TBA	Selfie	Constantine Paraskevopoulos	

Television

Year	Title	Director	Notes
2007	The Man	Simon West	TV movie
2013	2013 MTV Movie Awards	Evan Silver	TV special
2018	American Dream/American Knightmare	Antoine Fuqua	Documentary film
2022–2023	Echo 3	Mark Boal; Jeffrey Nachmanoff	4 episodes
