= Never Should've Let You Go =

Single by Hi-Five

from the album Faithful and Sister Act 2: Back in the Habit
- B-side: "Whenever You Say"; "She's Playing Hard to Get"
- Released: September 27, 1993
- Genre: R&B; new jack swing
- Length: 4:41
- Label: Jive
- Songwriter: Eric Foster White
- Producers: Joe Thomas; Keith Miller

Hi-Five singles chronology
"Unconditional Love" (1993)	"Never Should've Let You Go" (1993)	"Faithful" (1994)

Music video
- "Never Should've Let You Go" on YouTube

"Never Should've Let You Go" is a song performed by American contemporary R&B group Hi-Five. It initially appeared on the soundtrack to the 1993 film Sister Act 2: Back in the Habit, starring Whoopi Goldberg, and was later included as the opening track on the group's third studio album, Faithful (1993). The song peaked at numbers 29 and 30 on the US Cash Box Top 100 and Billboard Hot 100 charts. The official music video for "Never Should've Let You Go" was directed by German director Marcus Nispel.

== Charts ==
Chart (1993)	Peak position
US Billboard Hot 100	30
US Hot R&B/Hip-Hop Singles & Tracks (Billboard)	10
US Top 40 Mainstream (Billboard)	37
US Rhythmic Top 40 (Billboard)	15
US Cash Box Top 100	29
