= Iris Stevenson =

American educator and music director

Iris Stevenson-McCullough is an American academic, public school teacher, and choir director. The 1993 American musical comedy film Sister Act 2: Back in the Habit is loosely based on her time as a choir director at Crenshaw High School.

== Biography ==
Stevenson grew up in a public housing neighborhood in Buffalo, New York. Her father was a blue-collar worker and part-time musician. Her mother was a domestic worker. Stevenson began composing at the age of three, and performing at the age of seven. She attended the Villa Maria Institute, an 18-student program for young artists that was part of the Villa Maria College. When she was fifteen years old she was awarded a four-year scholarship to attend the Oberlin Conservatory of Music in Ohio. After graduating, she taught at Canisius College and obtained her masters in fine arts degree in music pedagogy from the State University of New York at Buffalo.

In 1985, she moved to Los Angeles to work as a music teacher in the Los Angeles Unified School District. She teaches piano, choir, music theory, and practical application of music, at Crenshaw High School, a predominantly African-American public high school in Los Angeles. She has taken the school's choir to perform on multiple national television specials. In 1992 and 1993, brought the choir to perform in the Worldwide Music Festival in Nice, France. She also led the choir to win four years in a row at the Jamaica Jazz and Blues Festival. She now works as the Chair of the Musical Department at Crenshaw.

Stevenson is also the director of music ministries at Angeles Mesa Presbyterian Church.

In May 1991 Stevenson was one of hundreds of Los Angeles public school teachers who were at risk of losing their jobs during a mass lay-off. She fired back publicly against the school board, which caught the attention of film producer Dawn Steel, who turned her story into the musical comedy film Sister Act 2: Back in the Habit.

In 2014, after taking the Crenshaw Choir to perform at the White House for President Barack H. Obama and First Lady Michelle Obama, Stevenson was prevented from teaching for 120 days by the school board. Her suspension led to protests outside of the high school. She also participated in American Hustle Life where she taught Suga, V and Jungkook of the South Korean boy band BTS the important bases of hip hop.
