= Deep Cover (song) =

1992 single by Dr. Dre and Snoop Doggy Dogg

Single by Dr. Dre and Snoop Doggy Dogg

from the album Deep Cover (soundtrack)
- B-side: "Party Groove"; "Back to Life"
- Released: April 9, 1992
- Recorded: 1991
- Studio: GF Studios (Hollywood, Los Angeles)
- Genre: G-funk; gangsta rap; hardcore hip-hop
- Length: 4:17
- Label: SOLAR; Epic
- Songwriters: Andre Young; Calvin Broadus; Tracy Curry; Colin Wolfe
- Producers: Dr. Dre; Colin Wolfe

Dr. Dre singles chronology
"Funky Flute" (1991)	"Deep Cover" (1992)	"Nuthin' but a 'G' Thang" (1993)

Snoop Doggy Dogg singles chronology
"Deep Cover" (1992)	"Nuthin' but a 'G' Thang" (1993)

Audio sample
- "Deep Cover": file; help

Music video
- "Deep Cover" on YouTube

"Deep Cover" is the debut solo single by American rapper and producer Dr. Dre and his first track released after the breakup of N.W.A. The track was recorded for the soundtrack of the film Deep Cover by SOLAR Records and distributed by Epic Records. The song features fellow American rapper Snoop Doggy Dogg in his first appearance on a record release. Shortly after the song's release Dr. Dre and Snoop Dogg remade the song and released it as "One Eight Seven" under Death Row Records. In 1994 "One Eight Seven" was remixed for the reissue of the Deep Cover soundtrack and retitled "187um".

== History ==
The album peaked on the Billboard 200 albums chart at #166 on July 25, 1992. Apart from the soundtrack compilation, it also appeared as a single and on Dr. Dre's First Round Knock Out, which spent two weeks on the Billboard 200 starting at #52 and later on several greatest hits albums, including: Doggy Stuff and Doggy Style Hits. Like the artist indication on the original 12" vinyl says, "Dr. Dre introducing Snoop Doggy Dogg", it is the first time Snoop Dogg was featured on a record. As a single it had no major breakthrough regarding sales, but it launched Snoop Dogg's career. It samples a number of 1960s, 1970s, and 1980s funk acts, such as Undisputed Truth's "(I Know) I'm Losing You", the song "Bad Times" by Tavares, and Sly & the Family Stone's "Sing a Simple Song", which provided the drumbeat. The bassline is similar to part of the bassline found in the jazz composition "Zoltan," written by Woody Shaw and performed by Shaw, organist Larry Young, and Joe Henderson and Elvin Jones, on Larry Young's album Unity.

The single was set to be released on The Chronic, but fallout from Body Count's banned song, "Cop Killer", prevented it since this song is also about killing police officers. Despite being praised by critics, the film itself did not have much commercial success, and it only received two nominations on the Independent Spirits Awards in 1993; however, the song was well received. During the 2007 VH1 Hip Hop Honors show, T.I. and B.G. performed this song during Snoop's honor ceremony.

== Music video ==
The plot of the video resembles that of the same-titled movie starring Laurence Fishburne and Jeff Goldblum. An undercover cop goes deep in the hierarchic pyramid of the underground mafia to get the bosses locked up, and "goes deep" also by getting addicted to drugs while trying to not reveal himself. The video begins in the first scene with Snoop, marking Snoop's first appearance in a music video, Dre and a black kingpin in a smoky office in the middle of an initiation where Snoop has to decide between the pipe and being caught up. After that introduction the music starts but the rest of the video is rather cut-to-cut and is a mixture of some five seconds long takes in black and white and some pictures from the motion picture. The scenes take place in a filthy concrete bungalow with several crack addicts and a projector flashing the movie itself on the wall, in addition to a rooftop of a building with the skyline of Downtown Los Angeles directly behind. The house is later raided by the drug squad. There's also a scene with Snoop and Dre wearing business suits in a car, but it has no additional meaning to the plot.

== Other versions ==
=== "One Eight Seven" and "187um" ===
A second version of this song, released by Death Row Records and titled "One Eight Seven", was released as a B-side track on the 1992 Dre Day single. It features the same chorus as the soundtrack version but with entirely new verses and a slightly modified beat.

A third version, titled "187um" was released on the reissue of the Deep Cover soundtrack in 1994 and on the hip-hop compilation album One Million Strong in 1995. It has the same alternate verses as "One Eight Seven", with further differences in the beat and a more explicit chorus, replacing "undercover cop" with "motherfuckin' cop".

The titles of these versions, like the choruses, refer to the paragraph number of the California Penal Code that defines murder.

=== "Twinz (Deep Cover '98)" ===
New York rappers Big Pun and Fat Joe collaborated to make a remix of the song titled "Twinz (Deep Cover '98)", for Pun's debut studio album Capital Punishment, released in 1998. The idea for the song was suggested to Pun by Joe, who liked the original song, and wanted to use the instrumental as something to appeal to listeners of both East Coast and West Coast hip hop alike. The song was released as a single in 1998. Snoop Dogg also made a brief appearance in its music video.

== Credits ==
- Dr. Dre: voice, producer
- Snoop Dogg: voice, songwriter
- Colin Wolfe: bass
- Eric Borders: guitar

== Track listing ==
- CD promo
1. "Deep Cover" (radio version) – 3:48
2. "Deep Cover" (u-n-c-e-n-s-o-r-e-d) – 4:27
- 12" vinyl
1. "Deep Cover" (radio version) – 3:48
2. "Deep Cover" (u-n-c-e-n-s-o-r-e-d) – 4:27
3. "Deep Cover" (instrumental) – 3:54
- 12" vinyl – Soul 2 Soul
1. "Deep Cover" (vocal mix) – 4:27
2. "Deep Cover" (instrumental dub) – 3:54
3. "Party Groove" – 4:22
4. "Back to Life" – 3:20

== Charts ==
=== Weekly charts ===
Chart (1992)	Peak position
US Hot R&B/Hip-Hop Songs (Billboard)	46
US Hot Rap Songs (Billboard)	4
