= Menace II Society (soundtrack) =

Menace II Society (The Original Motion Picture Soundtrack)

Soundtrack album by Various artists
- Released: May 26, 1993
- Recorded: 1992–1993
- Studios: Dangerous Studios (New York, NY); The Edge Recording Studio (Inglewood, CA); Soundcastle (Los Angeles, CA); Battery Studios (New York, NY); D&D Studios (New York, NY); Pimp C Family Productions; Dallas Sound Lab (Dallas, TX); Big Ole Bud; Skip Saylor Recording
- Genres: Hip hop; R&B
- Length: 1:06:28
- Label: Jive
- Producers: Hughes brothers (exec.); Toby Emmerich (co-exec.); Ant Banks; Art & Rhythm; Brand Nubian; Chris Stokes; CMT; Cold 187um; DJ Premier; DJ Quik; DJ Slip; D'wayne Wiggins; E-A-Ski; Guru; MC Eiht; Pete Rock; Pimp C; The Cutthroats; The Dangerous Crew; QDIII; Robert "Fonksta" Bacon (co.)

Singles from Menace II Society
- 1. "Trigga Gots No Heart" Released: April 12, 1993; 2. "Streiht Up Menace" Released: May 31, 1993; 3. "Unconditional Love" Released: June 1, 1993

Menace II Society (The Original Motion Picture Soundtrack) is the soundtrack for Albert and Allen Hughes' 1993 teen hood drama film Menace II Society. It was released on May 26, 1993 via Jive Records, and consists primarily of hip hop music. The album is composed of sixteen songs and features performances by Boogie Down Productions, Brand Nubian, Da Lench Mob, DJ Quik, Hi-Five, Juanita Stokes, Kenya Gruv, MC Eiht of Compton's Most Wanted, Mz Kilo, Pete Rock & CL Smooth, The Cutthroats, The Dangerous Crew, UGK and YG'z.

Along with singles, music videos were produced for the songs: "Trigga Gots No Heart" by Spice 1, "Streiht Up Menace" by MC Eiht, and "Unconditional Love" by Hi-Five.

Several songs heard in the movie and the closing credits were not included on the soundtrack album. These include "Honey Love", "Slow Dance (Hey Mr. DJ)" and "Dedicated" by R. Kelly and Public Announcement, "Fly Away" by Hi-Five, "Love and Happiness" by Al Green, "Dopeman (Remix)" by N.W.A, "Atomic Dog" by George Clinton, "For the Love of You (Part 1)" by The Isley Brothers, "Computer Love" by Zapp, "Stay Strapped in South Central" and "Hot Wire Oldie" by Quincy Jones III, "Got to Give It Up" by Marvin Gaye, "Only the Strong Survive" by Jerry Butler, "Ghetto Bird" by Ice Cube and a remix to "Streiht Up Menace" by MC Eiht.

== Critical and commercial performance ==
Professional ratings
Review scores
Source	Rating
AllMusic	3.5/5 stars
Entertainment Weekly	N/A
The Source	3.5/5 stars

The soundtrack peaked at number 11 on the Billboard 200 and at number 1 on the Top R&B/Hip-Hop Albums chart in the United States. It was certified gold by the Recording Industry Association of America on July 27, 1993 and has been certified platinum since October 11, 1994.

Its lead single, "Trigga Gots No Heart", made it to number 71 on the Hot R&B/Hip-Hop Songs and number 9 on the Hot Rap Songs. The second single, "Streiht Up Menace", peaked at number 72 on the Billboard Hot 100 and at number 46 on the Hot R&B/Hip-Hop Songs. Its third and final single, "Unconditional Love", reached number 92 on the Billboard Hot 100 and number 21 on the Hot R&B/Hip-Hop Songs.

Complex placed the album at number 9 on their 25 Best Hip-Hop Movie Soundtracks Of All Time.

== Track listing ==
No.	Title	Writer(s)	Producer(s)	Length
1.	"Nigga Gots No Heart" (performed by Spice 1)	R. Green Jr.; S. Adams; M. Ogleton	E-A-Ski; CMT	3:07
2.	"Streiht Up Menace" (performed by MC Eiht)	A. Tyler; T. Allen	DJ Slip; MC Eiht	4:36
3.	"Packin' a Gun" (performed by Ant Banks)	A. Banks; S. Jordan; R. Gooden; A. Young; E. Wright; L. Patterson	Ant Banks	4:01
4.	"Top of the World" (performed by Kenya Gruv)	D. Wiggins; E. Baker; F. Busby	D'wayne Wiggins	4:04
5.	"Only the Strong Survive" (performed by Too $hort)	T. Shaw; A. Banks; R. Gooden; S. Jordan; M. Hampton	The Dangerous Crew	5:06
6.	"All Over a Hoe" (performed by Mz. Kilo)	R. Thomas; G. Hutchison; J. Long Jr.	Cold 187um	5:58
7.	"Guerillas Ain't Gangstas" (performed by Da Lench Mob)	D. Cooper; J. Washington; T. Gray; Q. Jones III	QDIII	4:09
8.	"You Been Played" (performed by Smooth)	J. Stokes; C. Strokes; R. Hebb	Chris Stokes	4:20
9.	"Lick Dem Muthaphuckas" (performed by Brand Nubian)	L. DeChalus; D. Murphy; T. Perry	Brand Nubian	3:20
10.	"Death Becomes You" (performed by Pete Rock, CL Smooth & YG'z)	P. Phillips; C. Penn; T. Guest; K. Guest	Pete Rock	4:12
11.	"Unconditional Love" (performed by Hi-Five)	L. Campbell	Art & Rhythm	5:04
12.	""P" Is Still Free" (performed by Boogie Down Productions)	L. Parker	DJ Premier	4:57
13.	"Stop Lookin' at Me" (performed by The Cutthroats)	A. Sealy; J. Edwards; Q. Dillon; K. Elam	GuRu; The Cutthroats	3:57
14.	"Pocket Full of Stones (Port Arthur Remix)" (performed by UGK)	B. Freeman; C. Butler	Pimp C	6:13
15.	"Can't Fuck Wit a Nigga" (performed by DJ Quik, J.F.N. & KK)	D. Blake; R. Bacon; J. Najar; K. McDonald	DJ Quik; Robert "Fonksta" Bacon (co.)	3:23
16.	"Trigga Gots No Heart (Bonus Track)" (performed by Spice 1)	M. Ogleton; R. Green Jr.; S. Adams	CMT; E-A-Ski	3:08
Total length:				1:06:28

Sample credits

- Track 3 contains elements from "Eazy-Duz-It" by Eazy-E
- Track 8 contains elements from "Sunny" by Wes Montgomery

== See also ==
- List of number-one R&B albums of 1993 (U.S.)

== Charts ==
=== Weekly charts ===
Chart (1993)	Peak position
US Billboard 200	11
US Top R&B/Hip-Hop Albums (Billboard)	1

=== Year-end charts ===
Chart (1993)	Position
US Billboard 200	86
US Top R&B/Hip-Hop Albums (Billboard)	11

== Certifications ==
Region	Certification	Certified units/sales
United States (RIAA)	Platinum	1,000,000^{^}
^{^} Shipments figures based on certification alone.
