= Marc J. Gregson =

American novelist (born 1985)

- Born: September 27, 1985 (age 41); Salt Lake City, Utah, U.S.
- Education: University of Utah (BA)
- Occupation: Novelist
- Children: 3
- Writing career
- Language: English
- Years active: 2024–present
- Genres: Fantasy, Young Adult, Dystopian Fiction
- Notable work: Above the Black trilogy
- Website: marcjgregson.com

Marc J. Gregson is an American novelist of fantasy and young adult fiction. His 2024 debut novel Sky's End, the first of his Above the Black fantasy trilogy, became a New York Times bestseller.

== Early life and career ==
Gregson was born in Salt Lake City, Utah in the United States. He gained inspiration for writing fiction while at junior high after being assigned a Halloween project. He states that "something about creative writing left [him] squirming with excitement." Gregson attended the University of Utah, where he received his Bachelor of Arts in English teaching. Gregson initially planned on obtaining a career in video game design.

Before becoming a published novelist, Gregson worked as a middle school English teacher at Eastmont Middle School in the Canyons School District. However, in 2026, Gregson announced his retirement from teaching to focus on his author career full-time. He reportedly spent years writing during his time teaching, developing five books, all of which were rejected.

=== Above the Black trilogy ===
Gregson first gained the idea of the Above the Black universe in 2015. Eventually, Gregson achieved publication success with his debut novel Sky's End, the first of the Above the Black series. The novel received widespread interest and popularity after Gregson went viral on platforms such as YouTube, Instagram, and TikTok after posting videos of his reaction to the cover art for Sky's End. It soon became a New York Times bestseller. The novel blends fantasy and dystopian elements and is aimed primarily at young adult audiences, taking inspiration from the Hunger Games series, Red Rising, and Attack on Titan. The novel received acclaim from critics, who praised its action, plot, themes, and character development.

The novel takes place in the Skylands, which consists of thousands of islands in the air that float above an endless sea of toxic black clouds. The people of the islands occasionally encounter Gorgantauns, which are long snake-like dragons made of nearly impenetrable steel. The story follows 16-year-old Conrad of Urwin, who must retrieve his sister after being separated from her six years prior when Conrad's father was killed by Ulrich, Conrad's murderous uncle. After Conrad's mother dies in a Gorgantaun attack, Conrad must try to save his sister while avoiding the many obstacles that Ulrich lies before him.

=== Other works ===
In addition to YA fantasy, Gregson will expand into adult science fiction with Behind the Glass, his debut in that genre, set for release on November 10, 2026.

On May 28, 2026, Gregson announced an upcoming prequel trilogy to the Above the Black series, titled the Below the Black trilogy. The first book, Bright Sky, is set for release in fall 2027.

== Other activities ==
=== Sky's End film adaptation ===
In July 2023, Bob Higgins, a film producer from Trustbridge Entertainment, expressed interest in a film adaptation of Sky's End, nearly one year before the book was released to the public. Gregson's publisher, Peachtree Teen, informed him of the news. In October 2023, Higgins purchased rights to the book and began the process of attaching a filmmaker to the project.

On May 6, 2024, Antoine Fuqua, the director of commercially successful films such as Training Day, The Magnificent Seven, and The Equalizer, became officially attached to the project as a producer alongside his production company, Hill District Media. On the same day, Gregson posted clips of himself revealing the announcement personally to his middle school students, which once again went viral and amassed over 50 million views and 3 million likes total over Instagram, YouTube, and TikTok.

In early 2025, a yet-to-be-disclosed screenwriter was hired for the film. Gregson read an early draft of the screenplay in December 2025 and expressed favorable reviews of it, lauding the screenwriter's faithfulness to the novel.

== Personal life ==
Gregson and his wife reside in Salt Lake City with their three children.

== Works ==
=== Above the Black trilogy ===
- Sky's End (January 2, 2024)
- Among Serpents (January 7, 2025)
- Downfall (January 13, 2026)

=== Other titles ===
- Behind the Glass (November 10, 2026)
