= American Dream/American Knightmare =

- Poster
- Genre: Documentary
- Directed by: Antoine Fuqua
- Music by: Aaron Zigman
- Country of origin: United States
- Original language: English

Production
- Producers: Bradley J. Fischer; Antoine Fuqua; Eva Gunz; Laeta Kalogridis; Anne-Marie Mackay; Edward McGurn; James Vanderbilt
- Cinematography: Conrad W. Hall
- Editors: Jeff Cowan; Adam H. Miller
- Running time: 85 minutes
- Production company: Mythology Entertainment

Original release
- Network: Showtime
- Release: December 21, 2018

American Dream/American Knightmare is a 2018 Showtime television documentary film about Suge Knight directed by Antoine Fuqua.

== Plot ==
American Dream/American Knightmare is a documentary about the life and career of gangsta rap producer and Death Row Records co-founder Suge Knight. The film includes interviews conducted by Fuqua with Knight between December 2011 and November 2012 in which Knight details how it all came about as well as how it all fell apart.

== Cast ==
- Marion "Suge" Knight Jr.
- Marion "Suge" Knight Sr., Suge's father
- Maxine Knight, Suge's mother
- Costello Knight, Suge's uncle
- Thomas Knight, Suge's uncle

== Broadcast ==
The film aired on Showtime at 8:30 p.m. on December 21, 2018, just months after Knight pleaded no contest to voluntary manslaughter in a 2015 hit-and-run case and was sentenced to 28 years in prison. It was given a rating of TV-MA.

== Reception ==
In his review of the film, Brian Lowry of CNN wrote, "Although Knight isn't always the most reliable narrator, the filmmaker gives him the latitude to tell his tale, describing a world of money, power and violence, while alternating between explaining and lamenting those dynamics." He later summarized, "Fuqua's approach isn't necessarily journalistic, but rather seems designed to let the mogul relate his own story as he experienced it."

In a review for Vulture.com, Paul Thompson wrote, "None of these conversations are particularly revelatory. Knight is given to aphorism and, obviously, to anything that will burnish his own myth." He adds that the film "is not quite hagiography, but it allows its subject the final say (and often the only say) on virtually all the key moments in his personal and professional lives."
