= Above the Black =

Young adult fantasy trilogy by Marc J. Gregson

- Sky's End (2024); Among Serpents (2025); Downfall (2026)
- Author: Marc J. Gregson
- Illustrator: Amir Zand (cover art)
- Country: United States
- Language: English
- Genre: Fantasy; Young Adult; Dystopian; Adventure; Drama; Action
- Publisher: Peachtree Teen
- Published: 2024–2026
- Media type: Print (hardcover and paperback); Audiobook; E-book
- No. of books: 3
- Website: marcjgregson.com/above-the-black-trilogy

Above the Black is a trilogy of young adult fantasy novels written by American novelist Marc J. Gregson. The trilogy follows teenage protagonist Conrad of Urwin, set in the Skylands, a collection of thousands of floating islands hovering above an endless sea of toxic black clouds. The islands are split into highs, middles, and lows, and are governed by meritocracy, with each level representing social status and condition. After his father's murder, Conrad and his mother are exiled to the lows by Conrad's uncle Ulrich. Conrad must save his sister before Ulrich corrupts her, all while avoiding dangerous sky serpents called gorgatauns that commonly attack the islands.

The novels in the trilogy are titled Sky's End (2024), Among Serpents (2025), and Downfall (2026). The first book was a New York Times best seller, with the complete trilogy receiving generally favorable reviews from critics. A film adaptation of Sky's End is in the early screenwriting stage of development.

== Background and composition ==
Marc J. Gregson had first envisioned the "floating island" setting of Sky's End in 2015, though the story and characters were never thought out at the time. Gregson partially took inspiration of himself for the main protagonist Conrad after receiving his fifth rejection from a literary agent regarding previous attempts to publish earlier books, in which he "sat down and started writing a character who was frustrated and would never give up." Gregson also claims to have taken inspiration from the Hunger Games series, Red Rising, and Attack on Titan for his novel.

Gregson states to have drawn inspiration from Count of Monte Cristo and Treasure Island for the revenge and adventure aspects of the plot in Among Serpents.

== Plot ==
=== Sky's End ===
The novel is set on Holmstead, one of the Skylands, a civilization of floating islands suspended above a seemingly endless layer of black clouds that dissolve anything they touch. Governed by a rigid meritocracy, Skyland society is divided into the highs, middles, and lows and is under constant threat from gorgantauns, giant steel-scaled flying serpents.

Sixteen-year-old Conrad, formerly a member of the highs, has been exiled to the lows with his terminally ill mother, Elise, after his uncle Ulrich murdered Conrad’s father and seized control of Holmstead, retaining custody of Conrad’s younger sister, Ella. Hoping to rescue Ella and avenge his father, Conrad sets out to confront Ulrich, but a gorgantaun attack devastates Holmstead and kills Elise. After the attack, Ulrich offers Conrad a deal: if he joins the Selection of the Twelve Trades, Ella will be returned to him. Ulrich manipulates the selection to place Conrad in the hunter trade, where he reunites with Bryce, a mysterious girl who saved his life during the attack.

Conrad is assigned to the hunter ship Gladian alongside Bryce, Pound, Roderick, Keeton, Sebastian, Eldon, and Samantha. Under the guidance of Koko, the head of the hunter trade, the trainees compete in the Gauntlet, a series of trials designed to determine their standing within the Order. Pound initially becomes captain after sabotaging Conrad during the selection duels, but his reckless leadership prompts a mutiny. Sebastian succeeds him but proves equally authoritarian before disappearing during a battle with a gorgantaun. Conrad kills the creature and earns the crew’s trust, leading to his election as captain.

As Conrad leads the Gladian to the top of the Gauntlet standings, he develops close relationships with his crewmates. The competition is interrupted after intelligence suggests that spies from the Below — a civilization beneath the black clouds believed to have been destroyed centuries earlier — have infiltrated the Order. Conrad discovers Bryce is one of the infiltrators, but she escapes before he can expose her. After the Gladian wins the Gauntlet, Conrad learns that Ulrich has become king after killing the previous ruler in a duel. Sebastian is also revealed to have survived and now harbors a deep resentment toward Conrad.

Ordered to interrogate the captured Bryce, Conrad instead learns from her that Admiral Goerner, commander of the king’s military, is another spy. Goerner kidnaps Conrad and Bryce before they are rescued by the Gladian crew. The confrontation escalates into a battle between the Skylands and the forces of the Below. During the conflict, Goerner releases the gigataun, a colossal serpent that overwhelms the Skylands’ defenses and destroys Ironside, the kingdom’s capital island.

Following the battle, Bryce defects from the Below and reconciles with Conrad. Ulrich names Conrad his heir and reveals Ella’s whereabouts, allowing the Gladian to reunite with her. Bryce rejoins the crew, while Eldon transfers to another hunter ship. Although Ulrich offers Conrad command of a larger vessel, he declines, choosing to remain aboard the Gladian with his friends. As the Skylands formally declare war on the Below, Conrad and his crew prepare for the coming conflict.

=== Among Serpents ===
Three months after the Battle of Ironside, Conrad struggles to help Ella adjust to life aboard the Gladian. Following an attack by a torton that severely damages the ship, Conrad and his crew travel to the island of Venator, headquarters of the hunter trade, where they discover the city has been infiltrated by Lantian spies from the Below. During the ensuing conflict, the Gladian is captured by Goerner’s forces, but Ella frees the crew, allowing them to reclaim the ship and escape after the Skylanders secure victory at Venator.

Bryce reveals that the Lantians possess biomechanical symbions implanted into their necks, enabling them to detect nearby Lantians and creatures while also sharing memories through physical contact. Realizing the implant allows the enemy to track Bryce, Conrad helps her remove it before reporting its existence to Ulrich. After returning to Holmstead, Ulrich pressures Conrad to abandon the Gladian and join the royal military, but Conrad refuses. Conrad and Bryce also begin a romantic relationship despite the objections of both Ulrich and Ella.

When Goerner launches an assault on Holmstead, he unleashes the gigataun, which destroys much of Ulrich’s fleet and causes the island to fall into the black clouds. In response, Ulrich dispatches the Gladian on an expedition beyond Sky’s Edge, a wall of vicious clouds, to recover the Collapser, an ancient weapon believed capable of killing the gigataun. Joined by new crewmates as well as a team of explorers, the crew crosses the storm barrier and discovers stowaways Ella and Sebastian aboard the ship.

After reaching the island of Celentus, the expedition retrieves the key needed to obtain the Collapser, though several members of the party are killed by the inhabitant creatures. Sebastian warns Conrad that a Lantian spy has infiltrated the expedition, but Conrad dismisses the claim. While traveling to the island of Perditio to retrieve the weapon itself, the Gladian is ambushed after the spy reveals their location. Conrad surrenders to ensure Bryce and Ella escape with the Collapser and is taken prisoner by Goerner and the now traitorous Sebastian. Through Goerner’s symbion, Conrad learns that he and Ella are descended in part from the Lantians. A month later, Pound and his family attack Perditio, enabling Conrad to escape and reunite with his crew, although Roderick has been taken captive into the Below.

The Gladian rejoins the Atwood armada and confronts the gigataun during its assault on the Island of Dandun. Using the Collapser, Conrad’s forces kill the creature, and Goerner is captured by Ulrich.

Two months later, Ulrich disowns Conrad and Ella after learning of their Lantian ancestry and names his newborn son, Thaddeus, as his new heir. He consolidates his rule by executing the masters of every trade, including Koko, and replacing them with loyal supporters. Declaring that the Below must be eradicated despite its defeat, Ulrich seizes the Collapser and orders Conrad to lead an invasion beneath the black clouds. Enraged by Ulrich’s actions and tyranny, Conrad resolves to assassinate him before the campaign can begin.

=== Downfall ===
Weeks after Ulrich announces his plan to invade the Below, Conrad secretly trains to challenge him. Following the execution of innocent Lantians, Bryce ends their relationship over Conrad’s growing obsession with revenge. Hoping to rescue the imprisoned Roderick, Conrad interrogates the captive Goerner, who transfers his remaining memories to Conrad through his symbion before dying. The exchange reveals Roderick’s location in the Below and leaves Goerner’s pet cobron, Angh, attached to Conrad. Assuming his friends’ lives to be in danger, Conrad persuades Ella to flee aboard one of Keeton’s ships.

When the Below offers to surrender, Ulrich refuses to negotiate and instead fires the Collapser into the civilization beneath the black clouds, killing thousands of Lantians, including Bryce’s family. Declaring Conrad and his allies traitors, he banishes them to the Below in escape pods. Using Goerner’s memories, Conrad guides the surviving prisoners through the hostile underground wilderness until they reunite with Bryce, Arika, and members of the Lantian resistance. There, Conrad meets Cole, a member of the Lantian Council who hopes to negotiate a new peace treaty with the Skylands.

Conrad and his companions are captured by Lantian soldiers and imprisoned in Zone 6, where Sebastian has aligned himself with the Below. After enduring weeks of imprisonment, Conrad escapes with Cole’s assistance and is brought before the Lantian Council. Goerner’s father, Armin, agrees to negotiate a second peace treaty after Angh defeats his cobron in a ceremonial duel. When Ulrich arrives to discuss the agreement, he rejects the treaty and orders an attack on the Lantians, killing Cole, Angh, and mortally wounding Conrad before retreating to the Skylands.

Conrad survives and later escapes Sebastian’s custody after learning that the Skylands believe him to be dead. Leaving Sebastian stranded on an isolated island, he secretly travels to the island of Renascent under the alias “Red.” There, he earns recognition as a skilled duelist, starts a blacksmith business, and is trained by a duchess named Cassandra, to challenge her corrupt brother, Sander. Although Conrad defeats Sander and inherits his estate, Cassandra withdraws contact after Conrad reveals his true identity.

As opposition to Ulrich spreads across the Skylands, Conrad builds his own army and reunites with Ella, Bryce, Roderick, and the surviving members of the Gladian. He reconciles with Bryce, while Samantha exacts revenge on Sebastian for paralyzing her in the gauntlet by defeating and killing him in a duel. Conrad also allies himself with Pound, whose family has assumed control of the Sky Pirates, allowing Conrad to secure the pirates’ loyalty.

After Ulrich learns Conrad is alive, the royal fleet launches an offensive against the growing rebellion. Despite early victories, Conrad’s forces suffer heavy losses before regrouping for a final assault on the island of Frozenvale, where Ulrich has established his stronghold. Supported by allied fleets led by Eldon and Cassandra, Conrad infiltrates Ulrich’s defenses by traveling through the digestive system of the king’s personal gigataun while concealed inside an indestructible container. While Madeline falsely announces Conrad’s death to facilitate the operation, Conrad reaches Ulrich’s manor and publicly challenges him to a duel to the death. Ulrich reluctantly accepts and unsuccessfully attempts to have Conrad assassinated before the match.

The following day, Conrad defeats and kills Ulrich after a prolonged duel, ending his reign. He is immediately crowned king of the Skylands.

In the aftermath, Conrad assumes guardianship of Thaddeus and reorganizes the kingdom. He establishes the Miners, a new trade dedicated to rebuilding the Below following the Collapser’s destruction, formally ratifies a third peace treaty with the Lantians, and begins restoring relations between the two civilizations. The novel concludes with Conrad and Ella honoring their parents in a private memorial as the Gladian reunites at Frozenvale.

== Reception ==
Immediately after release, Sky's End made it on the 2024 New York Times bestseller list. Kirkus Reviews called Sky's End book "a thrilling and brilliantly realized series opener," praising Gregson's prose, stating that he provides "a skillful blend of action, suspense, and comic relief". Tami Orendain of BookPage Magazine gave the book a starred review, describing it as "action-packed, mysterious and satisfying" and that it's "a great read for anyone who loves fantasy and dystopian fiction." Heather Cashman from Publishers Weekly praised the characters and action, though she criticized the story for its melodramatic nature, stating that Gregson "plunges headlong into a first-person-present adventure that alternates high-stakes action with nuanced interpersonal drama." In 2025, Sky's End was nominated by the American Library Association on the list of Best Fiction for Young Adults, with reviewer Cathy DeCampli praising the book's fast pacing and political drama. Common Sense Media gave the novel five out of five stars, praising the character development, drama, and world-building, concluding that the novel "build[s] a solid foundation for a stellar debut fantasy series."

Reviewing Among Serpents, Kirkus Reviews praised the quick pacing and world-building, though they criticized the book's length and repetitiveness, overall calling it a "middle volume that will leave fans eager for the series closer". Common Sense Media once again praised the second novel's character development, though felt that it "delivers plenty more flying metal monster battles, but much less heart." They gave the novel three out of five stars.

As of July 2026, Downfall is the only novel in the trilogy to receive generally mixed reviews from critics, most notably for its excessive violence. Kirkus Reviews called the book "a fittingly epic but overstuffed finale weighed down by repetition". Common Sense Media felt that the "disturbing violence overshadows [the] high-octane fantasy finale," though they praised the satisfying conclusion, once again giving the novel three out of five stars.

== Film adaptation ==
In July 2023, Bob Higgins, a film producer from Trustbridge Entertainment, expressed interest in a film adaptation of Sky's End, nearly one year before the book was released to the public. In October 2023, Higgins purchased rights to the book and began the process of attaching a filmmaker to the project.

On May 6, 2024, Antoine Fuqua, became officially attached to the project as a producer alongside his production company, Hill District Media. On the same day, Gregson posted clips of himself revealing the announcement personally to his middle school students, which went viral and amassed over 50 million views and 3 million likes total over Instagram, YouTube, and TikTok.

In early 2025, a yet-to-be-disclosed screenwriter was hired for the film. Gregson read an early draft of the screenplay in December 2025 and expressed favorable reviews of it, lauding the screenwriter's faithfulness to the novel.
