= Gordon Strachan (rugby union) =

Scotland international rugby union player

- Born: Gordon Matthew Strachan; 16 November 1947 Littlemill, East Ayrshire, Scotland
- Died: 3 May 2016 (aged 68)
- School: Ayr Academy

Rugby union career
- Position: Number 8
Amateur team(s)
Years	Team	Apps	(Points)
- Ayr
–	Jordanhill		
Provincial / State sides
Years	Team	Apps	(Points)
- Glasgow District
International career
Years	Team	Apps	(Points)
1971–1973	Scotland	5	

Gordon Matthew Strachan (16 November 1947 – 3 May 2016) was a Scottish rugby union player who was capped five times by his country.

== Rugby Union career ==
=== Amateur career ===
Strachan was born in 1947 in Littlemill, Ayrshire. After leaving Ayr Academy, he played rugby for Ayr RFC and then Jordanhill College.

=== Provincial career ===
He played for Glasgow District.

=== International career ===
While a Jordanhill player, he played five times for Scotland at number 8, his first appearance being in the match against England in March 1971. He received his final cap against Presidents XV in 1973. He returned to Ayr in the late 1970s, when he captained the team, and after retiring from playing, coached Ayr, taking them from the third division to the first. He later worked as a P.E. teacher at Kyle Academy in Ayr.

== Family ==
His youngest daughter Shonagh was a member of girl band Lemonescent in the 2000s. Middle daughter Lorna was a successful fashion designer in the US before creating the flower pressing brand Pressed Petals UK in the 2020s.

== Death ==
He died on 3 May 2016, aged 68, after suffering from cardiac amyloidosis.
