= Deep Cover (soundtrack) =

Soundtrack album by various artists
- Released: April 14, 1992
- Recorded: June 1991–February 1992
- Studio: GF Studios (Hollywood, Los Angeles)
- Genres: Hip hop; R&B; new jack swing; reggae
- Length: 59:03
- Labels: SOLAR; Epic
- Producers: Dick Griffey (exec.); Hank Caldwell (exec.); Calloway; Dr. Dre; Bilal Bashir; Chris "The Glove" Taylor; Christopher Troy; Clifton Dillon; Cold 187um; Colin Wolfe; Dee Bristol; Eric "The Drunk" Borders; Mark Taylor; Michel Colombier; Mikey Bennett; The Characters; The Unknown DJ; Zack Harmon

Singles from Deep Cover
- 1. "Deep Cover" Released: April 9, 1992; 2. "Mr. Loverman" Released: 1992

Deep Cover (Music from the Original Motion Picture Soundtrack) is the soundtrack to Bill Duke's 1992 film Deep Cover. It was released on April 14, 1992 through SOLAR Records and consisted of hip hop, reggae and R&B music. The soundtrack peaked at 166 on the Billboard 200 and 9 on the Top R&B/Hip-Hop Albums and featured the popular single "Deep Cover" by Dr. Dre and Snoop Doggy Dogg in his first official appearance on a song.

== Track listing ==
No.	Title	Writer(s)	Producer(s)	Length
1.	"Deep Cover" (performed by Dr. Dre and Snoop Doggy Dogg)	C. Wolfe; A. Young; C. Broadus	Dr. Dre	4:16
2.	"Love or Lust" (performed by Jewell)	C. Wolfe; A. Young; E. Borders	Dr. Dre	3:34
3.	"Down With My Nigga" (performed by Paradise)	D. Weldon; The Unknown DJ; A. Manuel; C. Broadus; C. Barriere	Rhythm D; The Unknown DJ	4:12
4.	"The Sex Is On" (performed by Po', Broke & Lonely)	C. Taylor; M. Lynn; R. Monge	Chris "The Glove" Taylor	4:28
5.	"The Way (Is In the House)" (performed by Calloway)	K. Robertson; R. Calloway; V. Calloway; S. Beckham	Reggie Calloway; Cino Calloway	4:25
6.	"The Minute You Fall In Love" (performed by 3rd Avenue)	T. Cardoza; T. Taylor	The Characters	5:29
7.	"John and Betty's Theme" (performed by Michel Colombier)	M. Colombier	Michel Colombier	2:31
8.	"Mr. Loverman" (performed by Shabba Ranks and Chevelle Franklyn)	R. Gordon; H. Lindo; M. Bennett	Clifton Dillon; Mike Bennett	3:37
9.	"I See Ya Jay" (performed by Ragtime)	B. Bashir; J. Scott; T. Browne; T. Smith	Bilal Bashir	4:36
10.	"Nickel Slick Nigga" (performed by Kokane)	J. Long; E. Birdsong; R. Ayers	Cold 187um	4:56
11.	"Typical Relationship" (performed by Times 3)	C. Troy; V. Davis; Z. Harmon	Christopher Troy; Zack Harmon	4:12
12.	"Digits" (performed by The Deele)	M. Taylor	Dee Bristol; Mark Taylor	4:59
13.	"The Sound of One Hand Clapping" (performed by Calloway)	D. Smith; V. Calloway	Reggie Calloway; Cino Calloway	3:08
14.	"Why You Frontin' on Me" (performed by EMmage)	C. Wolfe; E. Borders	Colin Wolfe; Eric "The Drunk" Borders	4:52
Total length:				59:03

Notes

- The song "It's On", performed by The Lady of Rage, Snoop Doggy Dogg and produced by Dr. Dre, remains unreleased and was listed on the original track listing; however, the song did not make the final cut. There is a rare and low-quality version that leaked on the internet.

== Charts ==
=== Weekly charts ===
Chart (1992)	Peak position
US Billboard 200	166
US Top R&B/Hip-Hop Albums (Billboard)	9

=== Year-end charts ===
Chart (1992)	Position
US Top R&B/Hip-Hop Albums (Billboard)	46
