= Lemonescent =

Scottish girl group

- Origin: Scotland
- Genres: Pop, dance-pop, R&B
- Years active: 2002–2005
- Label: Supertone/Universal
- Past members: Nikki MacLachlan; Sarah Cassidy; Shonagh Strachan; Lisa Rose Harrison; Emma Cassidy; Leona Skimming

Lemonescent were a Scottish girl group formed in 2002. The band achieved success in their native Scotland, scoring five top twenty hits on the Scottish Singles Chart (two of which reached the top five) and also scored three top forty singles on the UK Singles Chart between 2002 and 2005.

Despite some commercial success the group was subject to controversy in 2003, when one of their singles became ineligible to chart due to apparent bulk buying in an attempt to manipulate the charts. Their debut album also failed to chart in either the Scottish or UK Album charts and the group lineup changed several times before the band eventually disbanded in 2005.

The band members consisted of Lisa Rose (2002–2003), Nikki MacLachlan (2002–2004), Sarah Cassidy (2002–2004), Shonagh Strachan (2002–2004), Leona Skimming (2003–2004) and Emma Cassidy (2003–2004).

== History ==
Lemonescent came together through auditions for singers held by former Johnny Hates Jazz songwriter/member Iain MacDonald; He had chosen eight girls and then cut down to four with singer and dance champion Lisa Rose Harrison, former waitress Nikki Maclachlan, singer and dancer Sarah Cassidy, and Shonagh Strachan. They were signed to Supertone Records, distributed by Universal Music and came up with the name Lemonescent.

They released their first single "Beautiful" on 17 June 2002 (originally recorded and released by Iain's band Purely Physical in 1991, and originally featured TV presenter Jenny Powell on vocals). The video was filmed at Culzean Castle by Brighter Pictures, Directed by Gavin Hay. It reached No.70 in the UK Singles Chart. They performed at the Irn Bru Live + Loud festival in 2002.

They released their second single "Swing My Hips (Sex Dance)" on 29 October 2002 accompanied by a raunchy video showing them in tight denim shorts washing a car (inspired by cult film Cool Hand Luke). This performed slightly better peaking at No.48 in the UK charts, and topped DJ magazine's Beat charts. In March 2003, they released 3rd single "Help Me Mama", which charted at No.36, landing them their first UK top 40 hit, but shortly after it hit the chart, Harrison left the group. Harrison left the band due to disagreements with their manager over their sound. Their manager made several negative remarks about Lisa after she had left the band. After Harrison's departure, the remaining members auditioned for a replacement, eventually taking on two new members, Emma Cassidy (Sarah's cousin) and Leona Skimming.

Their fourth single (and their first to include new members Emma and Leona), "Cinderella" was released in June 2003, and entered the UK charts at No.31, their highest-charting hit of their career. In between releases the band would perform at roadshows up and down the UK, toured with boy band Triple 8, and performed at the Scotland v. Lithuania football match at Hampden Park in October 2003.

Their fifth single "Unconditional Love", released September 2003, was on course to give them their biggest hit, appearing at No.20 in the midweeks, but was removed from the chart due to suspicions of chart-rigging by bulksale-buying. It was confirmed by the Official Charts Company that hundreds of copies of the single were being bought in bulk in and around Glasgow.

The band released their debut album, Unconditional Love in October 2003. The album sold poorly and failed to chart. They supported Atomic Kitten on their UK tour in 2004, and in the same year performed at the D-Code 2004 event, aimed at warning teenagers of the dangers of drink, drugs and smoking. Other charity work included involvement in the "Go Yellow" walk in Glasgow, for which they performed a fundraising concert. Their final single was a cover version of Free's "All Right Now", with a promotional video filmed in Egypt. It sparked interest from television networks, with appearances on BBC's Top of the Pops Saturday, Top of the Pops 2, and The Saturday Show, ITV's The Chart Show, and others, but only peaked at number 37 in the UK Singles Chart. During promotion for this single, the band's manager got into several arguments with radio station executives, some of which refused to play the single in response, as well as arguments with band members and fans, which may have contributed to the single's low charting position.

Skimming left shortly after in 2004, citing 'musical differences', leaving the group back as a four-piece. The group continued to perform at roadshows, showcasing two new songs ("Model Life" and "Make My Fantasy Come True") but were never released, and the planned 2nd album was scrapped. Strachan left shortly after, leaving the group down to a trio.

Lemonescent split up in early 2005, with Sarah Cassidy explaining "it couldn't really go any further, so we decided to call it a day".

== Band members ==
- Sarah Cassidy – From Glasgow, she was a former tanning salon attendant, and represented Scotland at disco dancing. Pursued a career in theatre after the group split up, auditioning for the part of Dorothy in The Wizard of Oz in 2008. She was a contestant on the 2nd season of the UK version of The Voice. Sarah made it to the Live Shows but was knocked out in the quarter finals.
- Lisa Harrison – From Balloch, she previously worked as a bank clerk for Bank of Scotland. She reached the final sixty contestants on the television talent show Popstars. Left the band in March 2003 due to 'artistic differences', going on to pursue a solo career.
- Nikki MacLachlan – From Ardrossan, she was previously a waitress. She also reached the final sixty contestants on the television talent show Popstars, and worked in her local fish and chip shop for seven years before joining the group, despite having an allergy to fish.
- Shonagh Strachan – From Prestwick, she is the daughter of Scottish rugby union international Gordon Strachan. Joined the group after leaving school.
- Emma Cassidy – From Fife, joined the group in 2003. She is the cousin of Sarah Cassidy, and was previously a sales assistant in a clothes shop.
- Leona Skimming – Born in Cumbernauld, and raised in Edinburgh, a former Miss Scotland finalist in 2000. Performed in the stage musical Mamma Mia! before joining the group in 2003, and returned to the show in 2004 after leaving the group due to 'musical differences'. Performed the lead role in the stage musical Dick Whittington and His Wonderful Cat in 2008. She was also half of the duo Scarlet Pearl, along with her cousin Nicky Moore, and has acted and performed under the name Leona Marie. Appeared as an extra in episodes of River City and briefly appeared in the Still Game episode "A Fresh Lick". She also appeared on an episode of Come Dine with Me, in 2016, and came in 2nd place. She served as a judge on BBC talent show All Together Now.

== Discography ==
=== Albums ===
- Unconditional Love (2003)

=== Singles ===
- "Beautiful" (2002) – UK No. 70, Scottish Chart No.18
- "Swing My Hips (Sex Dance)" (2002) – UK No. 48, Scottish Chart No.12
- "Help Me Mama" (2003) – UK No. 36, Scottish Chart No.5
- "Cinderella" (2003) – UK No. 31, Scottish Chart No.3
- "Unconditional Love" (2003) (disqualified from charts)
- "All Right Now" (2004) – UK No. 37, Scottish Chart No.7
