= The Return (Hi-Five album) =

Studio album by Hi-Five
- Released: October 11, 2005
- Recorded: 2005
- Genre: R&B
- Length: 64:31
- Label: N'Depth Entertainment

Hi-Five chronology
Faithful (1993)	The Return (2005)	Legacy (2017)

The Return is the fourth studio album from American R&B group Hi-Five. It was released on October 11, 2005 on their own independent label, N'Depth Entertainment. It is the group's first studio album in twelve years as it also marks the final album ever to feature lead singer, Tony Thompson.

== Track listing ==
1. "Intro"
2. "Shake It Off"
3. "Ten Toes Up"
4. "Marinate"
5. "Girlfriend"
6. "After The Club"
7. "Anything"
8. "What U Need"
9. "Interlude: Poem "The Return""
10. "Feelin' U" (ft. Mike Jones & Paul Wall)
11. "Blend"
12. "Rock Ya Body" (ft. Bun B.)
13. "Run Da Club" (ft. Bizzy Bone & Paul Wall)
14. "Girlfriend" (Tristan Trotter Remix) (ft. DJ Whoadie)
15. "Rock Ya Body" (Remix) (ft. Bun B.)
16. "For All We Know"
