= Faithful (Hi-Five album) =

Studio album by Hi-Five
- Released: October 26, 1993
- Recorded: 1992–1993
- Genre: R&B; new jack swing
- Length: 38:19
- Label: Jive
- Producer: Joe, Keith Miller, Dallas Austin, Carl Bourelly, D-Nice, Arnold Hennings, Art & Rhythm, Timmy Allen

Hi-Five chronology
Keep It Goin' On (1992)	Faithful (1993)	The Return (2005)

Singles from Faithful
- 1. "Unconditional Love" Released: June 1, 1993; 2. "Never Should've Let You Go" Released: September 27, 1993; 3. "Faithful" Released: 1994; 4. "What Can I Say to You (To Justify My Love)" Released: June 20, 1994

Faithful is the third studio album from American contemporary R&B group Hi-Five, released October 26, 1993 via Jive Records. The album peaked at No. 105 on the Billboard 200 and at No. 23 on the Billboard R&B chart.

Four singles were released from the album: "Unconditional Love", "Never Should've Let You Go", "Faithful" and "What Can I Say to You (To Justify My Love)". "Never Should've Let You Go" was the most successful single from the album, peaking at No. 30 on the Billboard Hot 100 in 1994.

Faithful is the final album that was released by Jive and is the only album to feature two newcomers Shannon Gill and Terrence Murphy.

== Track listing ==
No.	Title	Writer(s)	Length
1.	"Never Should've Let You Go"	Eric Foster White	4:42
2.	"Miss U Girl" ( (Note: "Miss U Girl" contains a sample of "Blind Man Can See It" as performed by James Brown.))	James Brown; Charles Bobbit; Fred Wesley; Dallas Austin	4:27
3.	"I'm in Need"	Carl Bourelly; Derrick Jones; Roz Davis	4:47
4.	"Faithful"	Arnold Hennings	5:09
5.	"What Can I Say to You (To Justify My Love)" (featuring Nuttin' Nyce)	LaTeece Wallace; Larry "Rock" Campbell; Tiwanda Lovelace	4:30
6.	"Ready 4 U 2 Love" (featuring D-Nice)	Larry "Rock" Campbell	5:03
7.	"As One"	Anthony Beard; Timmy Allen	4:43
8.	"Unconditional Love"	Larry "Rock" Campbell	5:07

== Chart positions ==
Chart (1993)	Peak position
US Billboard 200	105
US R&B Albums (Billboard)	23
