= Sister Act 2: Back in the Habit =

1993 film by Bill Duke

- Theatrical release poster
- Directed by: Bill Duke
- Written by: James Orr; Jim Cruickshank; Judi Ann Mason
- Based on: Characters by Joseph Howard
- Produced by: Scott Rudin; Dawn Steel
- Starring: Whoopi Goldberg; Kathy Najimy; James Coburn; Maggie Smith
- Cinematography: Oliver Wood
- Edited by: John Carter; Pem Herring
- Music by: Marc Shaiman; Miles Goodman
- Production company: Touchstone Pictures
- Distributed by: Buena Vista Pictures Distribution
- Release date: December 10, 1993
- Running time: 107 minutes
- Country: United States
- Language: English
- Budget: $38 million
- Box office: $125 million

Sister Act 2: Back in the Habit is a 1993 American jukebox musical comedy film, directed by Bill Duke, and released by Touchstone Pictures. A sequel to the 1992 film Sister Act, it is loosely based on the life of Crenshaw High School choir instructor Iris Stevenson. The film follows Whoopi Goldberg reprising her role as Deloris Van Cartier, who returns to assist her nun friends in saving their struggling school. Maggie Smith, Kathy Najimy, Wendy Makkena, and Mary Wickes reprise their roles from the original film.

While Sister Act 2 was a box office success, it was initially not as well received by critics compared to its predecessor. However, the film has gained a devoted following over time, particularly for its energetic musical performances and uplifting themes. It starred Lauryn Hill in her breakout role, alongside Sheryl Lee Ralph, Alanna Ubach, and Jennifer Love Hewitt. Notable members of the film's choir include R&B singer Ryan Toby of City High and The War and Treaty singer Tanya Trotter. Gospel singer Erica Campbell of Mary Mary also appeared in the film as a member of the opposing choir.

== Plot ==
One year after the first film Deloris Van Cartier, now a headliner of her own show in Las Vegas, Nevada based on her experience hiding from the mob in a convent, is visited by Sisters Mary Robert, Mary Patrick, and Mary Lazarus. They explain that they've been working in the same high school Deloris attended when she was a young child, St. Francis High School in San Francisco, California as teachers, and convince her to return with them. Upon arrival, the Reverend Mother asks for her help turning the school around. She asks Deloris to resume her identity as Sister Mary Clarence and become the school's music teacher. She reluctantly agrees.

The sisters introduce Deloris to the other school staff, including the humble school principal Father Maurice, the eccentric and lively mathematics teacher Father Ignatius, the peevish Latin teacher Father Thomas, the school's cook Father Wolfgang, who is known to only cook Bratwurst, and school administrator Mr. Crisp, who is eager to close the school which has suffered from broader financial troubles and a lack of funding, so he can be rewarded with early retirement. In her first class (initially taught by Mary Lazarus), Deloris finds that the students don't take the class seriously and expect an easy "A" grade. After falling victim to the students' prank, she soon declares it to be "a brand new day" and orders them to be more disciplined. One student, Rita Louise Watson, walks out of class, but her fellow students refuse to join her, determined to earn their grades. When Deloris discovers the students are actually talented singers, she organizes them into a choir.

Sister Mary Robert discovers Rita is an especially talented singer and encourages Deloris to get her back in class. She succeeds by giving her Letters to a Young Poet and advising her to follow her passion for singing. The students and staff renovate the school's old music room and begin practicing in earnest. They gain confidence by performing a rousing rendition of "Oh Happy Day" at a school assembly. While cleaning the music room one day, Sisters Mary Robert, Mary Patrick, and Mary Lazarus discover old trophies that indicate the school was once renowned for its choir. They guess that the archdiocese might keep the school open if the choir wins this year's competition, so they enter the school into the All-State Music Competition that is taking place in six weeks in Hollywood, California. Father Maurice initially objects to the plan, but changes his mind after Deloris agrees to raise the money herself and get parental permission for each student to go. The nuns host a concert for the local community in order to raise the money required.

When Rita's mother, Florence, finds out she is in the choir, she forces her to quit because Rita's deceased father failed to make it as a singer. Rita unhappily complies, but, on the eve of the competition, forges her mother's signature on her consent form so she can go. Meanwhile, Mr. Crisp discovers Deloris's true identity and travels with the Fathers to pull the choir from the competition.

At the competition, the students are intimidated by the talented choirs upon seeing them perform and contemplate quitting. After Deloris lectures them about letting fear run their lives, they agree to stay. Upon arriving Father Maurice prepares to announce to the choir that they are being pulled out of the competition but relents when he sees their excitement, whilst the other Fathers lock Mr. Crisp in a store cupboard to prevent him from interfering. Rita takes to the stage and briefly experiences stage fright upon unexpectedly spotting Florence in the audience but then proceeds to give an impressive solo before the rest of the choir joins her to perform an urban contemporary gospel rendition of "Joyful, Joyful" with hip-hop choreography.

St. Francis win the competition and the archdiocese agrees to keep the school open. When Mr. Crisp finds them, Reverend Mother stops him from outing Deloris by saying that entering the competition was his idea. The archdiocese officials agree to keep him working much to his displeasure.

Rita is confronted by Florence and begins to apologize for her defiance, but Florence praises her daughter, never having heard her sing before. She then tells Rita she is proud of her, leading to a happy embrace between them. The choir reveal their suspicions that Deloris is not who she pretends to be, even mentioning a rumor that she is a Vegas showgirl. She corrects them, proudly stating "I am a headliner."

The movie ends with Deloris, no longer in a nun's habit, singing "Ain't No Mountain High Enough" with the students and teaching staff of St. Francis.

== Cast ==
Actor	Role
Whoopi Goldberg	Deloris Wilson-Van Cartier / Sister Mary Clarence
Kathy Najimy	Sister Mary Patrick
Barnard Hughes	Father Maurice
Mary Wickes	Sister Mary Lazarus
James Coburn	Mr. Crisp
Michael Jeter	Father Ignatius
Wendy Makkena	Sister Mary Robert
Sheryl Lee Ralph	Florence Watson
Robert Pastorelli	Joey Bustamente
Thomas Gottschalk	Father Wolfgang
Maggie Smith	Reverend Mother
Lauryn Hill	Rita Louise Watson
Brad Sullivan	Father Thomas
Alanna Ubach	Maria
Ryan Toby	Wesley Glen "Ahmal M'jomo Jamaael" James
Ron Johnson	Richard "Sketch" Pincham
Jennifer Love Hewitt	Margaret
Devin Kamin	Frankie “Frank-K”
Christian Fitzharris	Tyler Chase
Tanya Blount	Tanya
Mehran Marcos Sedghi	Marcos
Erica Atkins	Competing Choir
Deondray Gossett	Classroom Kid
Monica Calhoun	Classroom Kid
Deedee Magno Hall	Classroom Kid
David Kater	Classroom Kid
Valeria Andrews	Classroom Kid
Riley Weston	Classroom Kid
Pat Crawford Brown	Choir Nun
Alexandrea Martin	Classroom Kid

== Reception ==
=== Box office ===
The film was not as successful as Sister Act. It grossed $57.3 million in the United States and Canada and $67.3 million internationally for a worldwide total of $124.6 million, against a $38 million budget.

=== Critical response ===
On Rotten Tomatoes, the film has an 19% approval rating based on 36 reviews, with an average rating of 3.6/10. The consensus states: "Sister Act is off-key in this reprise, fatally shifting the spotlight from Whoopi Goldberg to a less compelling ensemble of pupils and trading its predecessor's sharp comedy for unconvincing sentiment." On Metacritic it has a score of 38% based on reviews from 23 critics, indicating "generally unfavorable reviews". Audiences polled by CinemaScore gave the film an average grade of "A−" on an A+ to F scale.

Roger Ebert of the Chicago Sun-Times rated it 2 out of 4 and wrote "What's strange about Sister Act 2: Back in the Habit is that it abandons most of what people liked about the first movie and replaces it with a formula as old as the hills." Brian Lowry of Variety wrote that it "Lacks the charm and buoyancy that made the first "Act" a mass-appeal hit." Rita Kempley of The Washington Post called it "Shamelessly contrived pap."

Ty Burr of Entertainment Weekly criticized the lack of originality but says "The recycling’s so cheerily blatant it almost short- circuits criticism" and "What saves the movie is a young cast with astonishing talent and energy: You respond to their high spirits more than to the hackneyed characters they play." He gave the film a B− grade.

The film gained a strong following since its release and became a cult classic among fans. Director Bill Duke said about the reception: "The reviewers at that time could not really be linked to our communities or the message. As you know, the faces of the reviewers were very different than the viewers. So I was surprised, but not shocked, because they didn't get us at the time. They didn't get the message and did not relate on an emotional level." Later he said: “I think a Black director doing something of this magnitude was not necessarily acceptable in those days... In those days, I was never going to get the same respect the original got.”

== Accolades ==
In a readers' poll conducted in 2014, the film ranked amongst the 25 Greatest Movie Sequels by Rolling Stone. In 2023, the movie was named one of best musical movies of all time by Marie Claire.

Award	Category	Nominee(s)	Result
American Comedy Awards	Funniest Supporting Actress in a Motion Picture	Kathy Najimy	Nominated
Kids' Choice Awards	Favorite Movie Actress	Whoopi Goldberg	Won
MTV Movie Awards	Best Comedic Performance	Whoopi Goldberg	Nominated
Young Artist Awards	Best Family Motion Picture - Comedy or Musical		Nominated

== Legacy ==
At the time of its release, Sister Act 2: Back in the Habit was panned by film critics. However, the film began to resurface in syndication, as its stars Lauryn Hill and Jennifer Love Hewitt became cultural phenomenons in the 1990s, ultimately leading the film to become a cult classic. Ryan Toby alluded to the film's cult status, stating "Contrary to popular belief, Sister Act II was considered a box office flop compared to the first one. The difference is, Sister Act II gained a cult following as it started playing on TV." It has since been reassessed over the years by modern journalists and is considered a standard in black cinema. David Dennis Jr. of Andscape, proclaimed "the cultural impact of Sister Act 2 is felt across movies, music and even your Sunday church services."

Rotten Tomatoes referred to the film as a landmark release for diversity in cinema, and a showcase of "representation in mainstream American film". Furthermore, the film has received praise by Vice as "a work of art whose ambition and execution redefined what sequels could do".

Lauryn Hill's performance has received acclaim from fans, critics and musicians alike. According to music executive Jerry L. Greenberg, Hill's role led her to receive a solo record deal offer from Michael Jackson, which she turned down due to being a member of The Fugees. Over the years, countless musicians have cited Hill's performance as an inspiration for them to pursue music careers, including Lianne La Havas, Colbie Caillat, August Alsina, Hillary Scott of Lady A, and Lecrae. Singer-Actress Janelle Monáe cited Hill's performance as a source of inspiration for her acting career. Pop star Katy Perry stated that the only secular music she was allowed to listen to growing up was the film's accompanying soundtrack. Perry also told Rolling Stone that she was raised on Hill and Tanya Trotter's version of "His Eye Is on the Sparrow". Billboard ranked Hill's performance at number 38 on their list of 'The 100 Best Acting Performances by Musicians in Movies' in 2018.

Additionally, English singer Harry Styles has cited Ryan Toby's singing in the film as the primary source of inspiration for him to pursue a music career. EGOT-winner Jennifer Hudson dressed up as Sister Mary Clarence (Whoopi Goldberg) during a Halloween episode of her daytime talk show The Jennifer Hudson Show. Hudson also name the film along with Goldberg as inspirations for her to pursue a career in music.

Sister Act 2: Back in the Habit along with gospel musician Kirk Franklin, has been credited with helping to usher in a new era of gospel music that made the genre more palatable to a wider audience by incorporating elements of hip-hop and modern rhythm and blues. Singer Syleena Johnson stated that "Sister Act 2 was part of the movement to bring all of that mainstream". The film's popularity seemingly led to a spike in interest for "glee clubs and choirs"; becoming a precursor to similar productions such as Glee (2009–2015), Joyful Noise (2012), and Praise This (2023). In Japan, the film inspired the creation of nearly thirty choirs in the country. Entertainer Ken Taylor stated "what happened was the businesses in Japan, who are quick to adopt these fads, started offering Gospel choir lessons. It was not the churches, but the community centers that had these choirs"; further adding "So here were non-Christians in Japan saying that they wanted to sing just like the nuns in the movie."

The music video for "Shake It Off" by Taylor Swift references the film during the end credits. Lizzo paid tribute to the film during her performance of "Juice" at the 2019 MTV Movie & TV Awards. The film's "Joyful, Joyful" scene was reenacted in the 'Game Over' episode, during season 3 of the American comedy series Broad City by Ilana Glazer and Abbi Jacobson, and featured Goldberg reprising her role.

=== Cast and crew’s response ===
Whoopi Goldberg was not particularly happy making the first movie and only made this sequel after Disney agreed to finance her dream project, Sarafina: "For me, I thought the first movie was just stupid and this one wasn't much better. When they asked me to do this one, I laughed. But when they agreed to fund Sarafina, I thought 'what the hell, I'll make some more money off 'em'. But I think it's fun, I think people like one and two, because they're kind of the same film but very different.“ Same with Jennifer Love Hewitt: “We all had a blast doing SISTER ACT. I have a lot of fun memories.“

== Soundtrack ==
The soundtrack album was released on November 23, 1993, by Hollywood Records, it reached #74 on the Billboard Top 200 Albums Chart and #40 on the Billboard Top R&B/Hip-Hop Albums charts and received a Gold certification from the RIAA for shipment of 500,000 copies on March 26, 1994.

1. Greatest Medley Ever Told – Whoopi Goldberg & The Ronelles
2. Never Should've Let You Go – Hi-Five
3. Get Up Offa That Thing/Dancing in the Street – Whoopi Goldberg
4. Oh Happy Day – St. Francis Choir featuring Ryan Toby
5. Ball of Confusion (That's What the World Is Today) – Whoopi Goldberg & the Sisters
6. His Eye Is on the Sparrow – Tanya Blount & Lauryn Hill
7. A Deeper Love – Aretha Franklin & Lisa Fischer
8. Wandering Eyes – Nuttin' Nyce
9. Pay Attention – Valeria Andrews & Ryan Toby
10. Ode to Joy – Chapman College Choir
11. Joyful, Joyful – St. Francis Choir featuring Lauryn Hill
12. Ain't No Mountain High Enough – Whoopi Goldberg & Cast

The finale performance of "Joyful Joyful" was produced and arranged by Mervyn Warren, noted jazz and gospel musician who is best known as an original member of a cappella vocal group Take 6. The arrangement also includes rap lyrics written by Ryan Toby, and a bridge adapted from the chorus of Janet Jackson's 1986 single, What Have You Done for Me Lately.

=== Certifications ===
Region	Certification	Certified units/sales
Germany	—	250,000
United States (RIAA)	Gold	500,000^{^}
^{^} Shipments figures based on certification alone.

== Home media ==
The film was released on VHS for rental in the United States on July 13, 1994. The all-region Blu-ray, including both Sister Act and Sister Act 2: Back in the Habit, was released on June 19, 2012, with both films presented in 1080p. The 3-disc set also includes both films on DVD with the same bonus features as previous releases.

== Future ==
When asked in 2013 about acting in a sequel, Whoopi Goldberg initially refused, but by 2015 changed her stance to a maybe. After a Broad City cameo, in 2016 Goldberg expressed doubts about a sequel based on missing cast members, but said she thought it would be fun and likeable. In May 2017, she affirmed her desire for the third film to happen, adding in July that she would like to direct it and had confidence it would be made. On December 7, 2018, it was confirmed that Regina Y. Hicks and Karin Gist were hired to write the script to Sister Act 3 for a release on Disney+. In December 2020, it was announced that Goldberg would be reprising the role of Deloris and serve as a producer alongside Tyler Perry.

On the October 6, 2022 episode of The View, actress Kathy Najimy stated that she had not heard anything formal about Sister Act 3; but that she had "heard rumblings about it." When she asked Whoopi Goldberg if Sister Act 3 was actually happening, Goldberg replied: "It's happening"; but did not publicly include or invite Najimy to be a part of it as she had with Jenifer Lewis and Tyler Perry live on the show days earlier. Goldberg did imply that Hocus Pocus 2 did help in getting Sister Act 3 the greenlight.

In October 2023, Goldberg traveled to Rome to meet Pope Francis at St. Peter's Square in Vatican City in preparation for the film. On February 7, 2024, Sheryl Lee Ralph, who played Florence Watson in the second film, confirmed that she would be reprising her role in the third film. Later that same month, Tyler Perry confirmed that the script was still being worked on. However, following Maggie Smith's, who played the Mother Superior in the films, passing on September 27, 2024, Whoopi Goldberg confirmed in November 2024 during an appearance on The Tonight Show with Jimmy Fallon that the script was being readjusted to accommodate story changes. In March 2025, Goldberg confirmed that the script for the film is completed and that they're waiting for Disney to give the film the greenlight.
