= Unconditional Love (Lemonescent album) =

Studio album by Lemonescent
- Released: 13 October 2003
- Genre: Pop

Unconditional Love is the debut and only album by Scottish girl group Lemonescent.

== Background ==
The original working title of the album was "Manipulated" in early 2003 and a portion of the tracks had originally been recorded with original member Lisa Rose Harrison. The original versions appeared as sound clips on Lemonescent's website, but were taken down after Harrison's departure. The tracks were re-recorded with replacement members Leona Skimming and Emma Cassidy's vocals added, with the exception of "Swing My Hips (Sex Dance)", where the Terminalhead remix that appeared on the cd single in 2002 was used. The original Terminalhead remix of "Beautiful" from 2002 was also used on the album.

Manager, producer, writer and instrumentalist Iain Macdonald had written the majority of the songs on the album, except for Unconditional Love, Cinderella and Help Me Mama, which were co-written with Audrey and Wendy Paterson. As well as Don't Be Afraid, which was co-written with member Sarah Cassidy, You Have Stolen My Heart, which was co-written with Cassidy and members Nikki Maclachlan and Shonagh Strachan, and The Love We Had Before, which was written by Cassidy.

== Release ==
The first single from Lemonescent and from the album was "Beautiful" which the group promoted across Scottish radio stations and filmed a video for at Culzean Castle in Ayrshire. Other promotional activities include a photo-shoot with Glasgow Rugby. Lemonescent undertook a signing campaign in HMV and Virgin stores in Scotland and England in the week of the album's release, but despite this campaign, the album sold poorly and failed to chart in the top 200 UK Album Chart. The album also failed to chart in the group's native Scotland, despite the group achieving five top twenty singles in the Scottish Singles Chart. After the stand-alone single, "All Right Now", a cover of the Free song, failed to chart high in 2004, the group later split in 2005.

As of 2024, the album remains long out of print.

== Track listing ==
1. . "Lemonescent Land" 3.15
2. . "Beautiful [Album Version]" 3.10
3. . "Unconditional Love" 3.23
4. . "Cinderella" 4.00
5. . "Give Me The Beat" 4.39
6. . "Help Me Mama [Album Version]" 3.07
7. . "When I Love You" 4.02
8. . "Feels Like Summertime" 3.34
9. . "Swing My Hips (Sex Dance)" 5.34
10. . "Don't Be Afraid" 3.39
11. . "The Love We Had Before" 3.05
12. . "You Have Stolen My Heart" 2.56
13. . "Ain't Got No Money" 3.57
14. . "Beautiful (Terminalhead Remix)" 5.37
