= I Can't Wait Another Minute =

1991 single by Hi-Five

Single by Hi-Five

from the album Hi-Five
- Released: June 1, 1991
- Genre: R&B
- Length: 5:03
- Label: Jive
- Songwriter: Eric Foster White
- Producer: Eric Foster White

Hi-Five singles chronology
"I Like the Way (The Kissing Game)" (1991)	"I Can't Wait Another Minute" (1991)	"Just Another Girlfriend" (1991)

"I Can't Wait Another Minute" is a song by American R&B quintet Hi-Five, and written and produced by songwriter Eric Foster White. It was released in June 1991 by Jive Records as the third single from their debut album, Hi-Five (1990), and spent one week at number one on the US Billboard Hot R&B Singles chart. The song also peaked at numbers eight and 16 on the Billboard Hot 100 and Cash Box Top 100 charts. The official music video was directed by Antoine Fuqua.

== Charts ==
=== Weekly charts ===
Chart (1991)	Peak position
US Billboard Hot 100	8
US Hot R&B Singles (Billboard)	1
US Cash Box Top 100	16

=== Year-end charts ===
Chart (1991)	Position
US Billboard Hot 100	60

== See also ==
- List of Hot R&B Singles number ones of 1991
