= Antoine Fuqua =

American director and producer (born 1965)

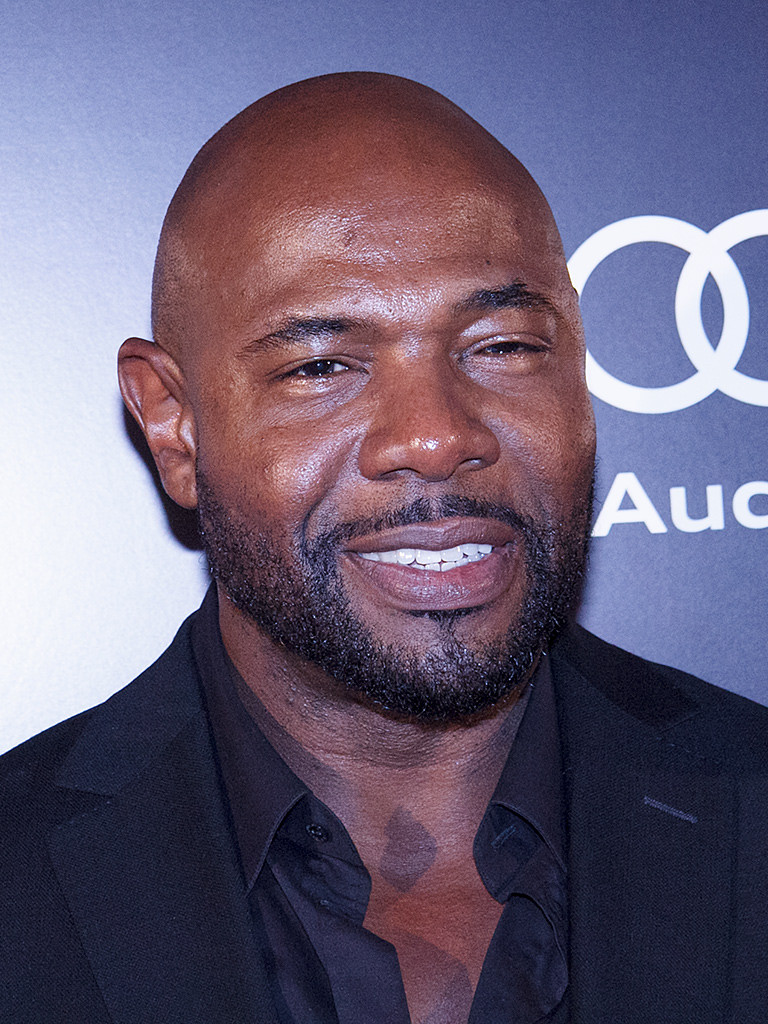
- Fuqua in 2016
- Born: May 30, 1965 (age 61); Pittsburgh, Pennsylvania, U.S.
- Occupations: Film director; producer
- Years active: 1990–present
- Spouse: Lela Rochon (m. 1999)
- Children: 3
- Family: Harvey Fuqua (uncle)

Antoine Fuqua (Note: Pronunciation: /ˈæntwɒn ˈfjuːkwə/, ANT-won FEW-kwə) (born May 30, 1965) is an American director and producer. Known for his work on film, television, and music videos, and for his work in the action and thriller genres, he was originally known as a director of music videos, and made his film debut in 1998 with The Replacement Killers. His critical breakthrough was the 2001 crime thriller Training Day, winning the Black Reel Award for Outstanding Director.

His subsequent films include Tears of the Sun (2003), King Arthur (2004), Shooter (2007), Brooklyn's Finest (2009), Olympus Has Fallen (2013), Southpaw (2015), The Magnificent Seven (2016) and The Equalizer trilogy (2014–2023), earning with the first one the NAACP Image Award for Outstanding Directing in a Motion Picture. He also directed the Michael Jackson biopic Michael (2026), making his highest-grossing film to date.

He also directed the critically acclaimed documentaries American Dream/American Knightmare (2018), What's My Name: Muhammad Ali (2019), and the 2022 Hulu documentary series Legacy: The True Story of the LA Lakers, for which he won the Sports Emmy Awards for Outstanding Documentary Series.

== Early life and education ==
Fuqua was born in Pittsburgh to Carlos and Mary Fuqua. He graduated from Taylor Allderdice High School in 1983. Before turning to filmmaking and music videos, Fuqua studied electrical engineering, with the hope of going on to fly jets in the military. He earned a basketball scholarship to West Virginia State, before transferring to West Virginia University.

Fuqua pays tribute to screenwriter Shinobu Hashimoto, a frequent collaborator of Akira Kurosawa's, saying his writing "affected a boy from Pittsburgh living in the ghetto."

[Shinobu Hashimoto's writing] was so beautiful and poetic and powerful and heartbreaking. It was all about justice, it was all about sacrifice, and it made me want to be one of those guys. I came from a rough area, and I had my own version of watching poor people getting pushed down – whoever the person was who had the power, they would come in and take from other people.

Fuqua later said that his experience of violence shaped his adolescence, and played a role in his eventual choice of career.

My first big break was when I got shot when I was fifteen. It changed my life and it made me not hang out in the streets as much, and go to the movies more. Those sort of things are wake up calls to have a better appreciation for life, and a better appreciation for the people around you. From that moment in my life I put all my energy into what I believed in, and at that time it was playing basketball and sports. That led me to a scholarship ... after that a professor said that I should take an art class ... I fell in love with an artist by the name of Caravaggio.

== Career ==
Fuqua began his career directing music videos for popular artists such as Toni Braxton, Stevie Wonder, and Prince. He directed Michelle Pfeiffer in the video Gangsta's Paradise by Coolio which was used to promote Jerry Bruckheimer's successful film Dangerous Minds.

The movie became a big hit and Jerry Bruckheimer was kind enough to give me a lot of credit for it because they used my music video ... the irony was people thought I was the new French film director. No one had any idea I was this guy from Pittsburgh, Pennsylvania. So I used to walk in the room and people would literally ask me to get coffee. And I would say, "No, no, I'm the director", and I loved watching their faces. That was fun.

From 1998 onwards, Fuqua began working primarily as a feature film director. In a tribute article for Time magazine, Fuqua expressed his early respect for Kurosawa as a filmmaker and how Kurosawa influenced his own perspective on filmmaking stating: "[screen writer Hashimoto's] ... working with Akira Kurosawa and Hideo Oguni, was so beautiful and poetic and powerful and heartbreaking. It was all about justice, it was all about sacrifice, and it made me want to be one of those guys".

His first feature films were the John Woo-produced action film The Replacement Killers (1998), starring Chow Yun Fat and the action comedy Bait (2000) starring Jamie Foxx. He then directed the crime thriller Training Day (2001), for which star Denzel Washington won an Academy Award for Best Actor. His next films were the action war drama Tears of the Sun (2003), the Arthurian legend film King Arthur (2004), the conspiracy action thriller Shooter (2007), the crime film Brooklyn's Finest (2009), and the action thrillers Olympus Has Fallen (2013) and The Equalizer (2014), the latter of which again pairs Fuqua with Denzel Washington. In 2011, he directed CIA procedural Fox pilot Exit Strategy starring Ethan Hawke.

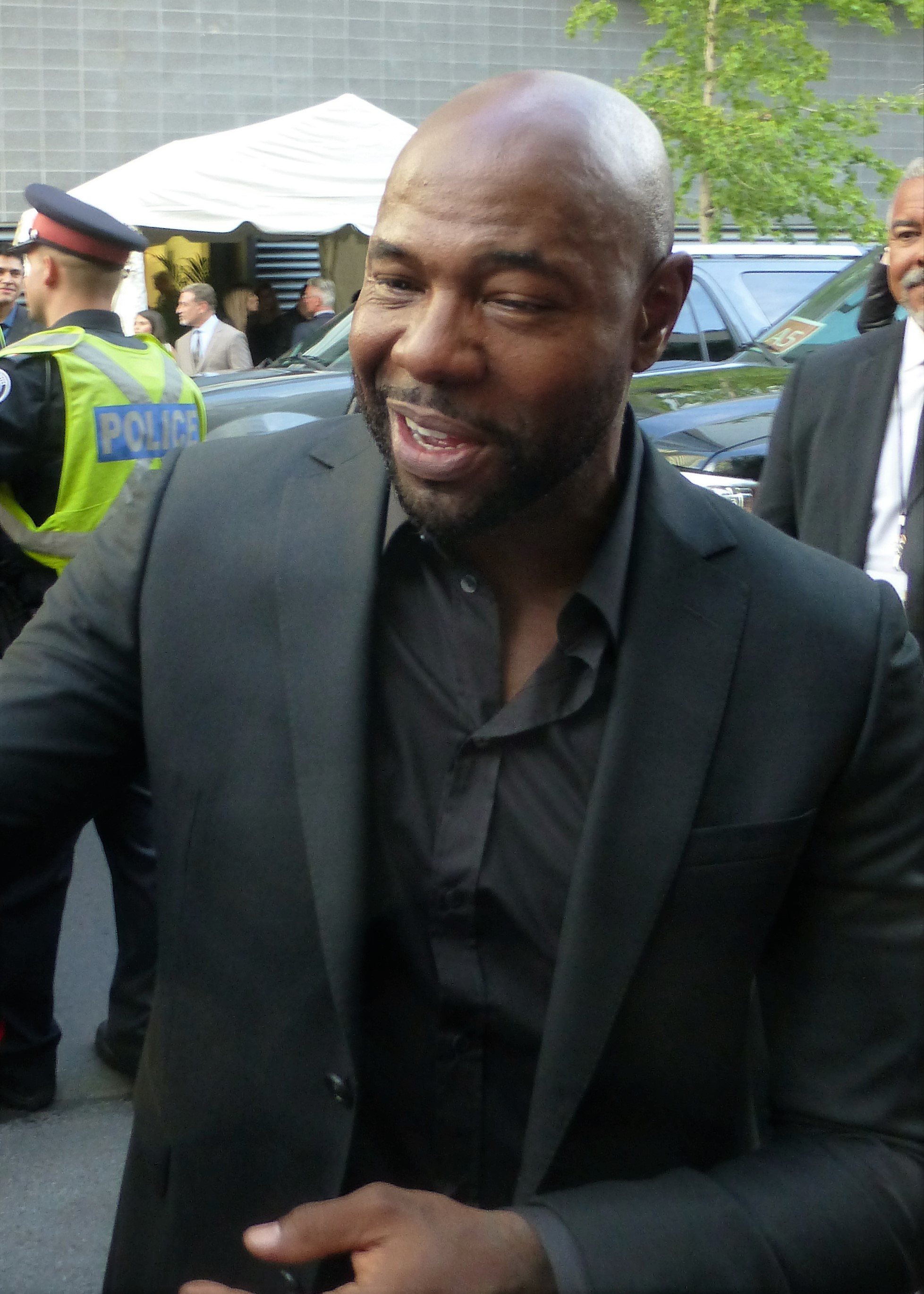
Fuqua at the 2016 Toronto International Film Festival

He co-created the comic-book miniseries After Dark with Wesley Snipes, which was written by Peter Milligan and illustrated by Jeff Nentrup. He was slated to direct Tupac Shakur's official biopic but the project was postponed to allow Fuqua to direct rapper Eminem's second feature film, Southpaw (2015). Eminem later left Southpaw to focus on his music, and was replaced with Jake Gyllenhaal.

Fuqua's 2016 film, The Magnificent Seven, was a remake of the classic 1960 Western of the same name which itself was an American remake of Kurosawa's 1954 film, Seven Samurai. Denzel Washington plays the lead role of Sam Chisolm.

In early 2018, Fuqua worked as one of the executive producers on the Fox medical drama series The Resident. In the summer of 2018, his thriller sequel The Equalizer 2 (2018) was released with Denzel Washington returning in the main role. In June 2021, Fuqua's sci-fi film Infinite, starring Mark Wahlberg and Chiwetel Ejiofor was released.

In 2021, Fuqua and actor Will Smith announced that their upcoming film, Emancipation, would not be filmed in Georgia because of the recent passage of Georgia's new voting law. Smith and Fuqua released a joint statement: "We cannot in good conscience provide economic support to a government that enacts regressive voting laws that are designed to restrict voter access". Emancipation was released in theatres on December 2, 2022, followed by a streaming release on Apple TV+ on December 9.

On December 3, 2021, he signed a first look deal with Netflix and renamed his production company from Fuqua Films to Hill District Media. He later signed an overall television deal with Paramount Television Studios and MTV Entertainment Studios.

In 2023, it was announced that Fuqua would be producing a television miniseries based on the life of Shaka.

In January 2023, Fuqua announced his next film project would be Michael, a biographical film about Michael Jackson, starring Jackson's nephew Jaafar Jackson and being produced by Graham King. The film was released in theatres on April 10, 2026.

In November 2023, it was announced Fuqua would reunite with Denzel Washington on a film about Hannibal for Netflix, with John Logan writing the screenplay. However, in June 2026, it was reported that pre-production of the film had been halted.

On May 6, 2024, Hill District Media became officially attached to develop the film adaptation of Sky's End, a YA dystopian fantasy novel written by Marc J. Gregson, with Fuqua serving as a producer.

== Personal life ==
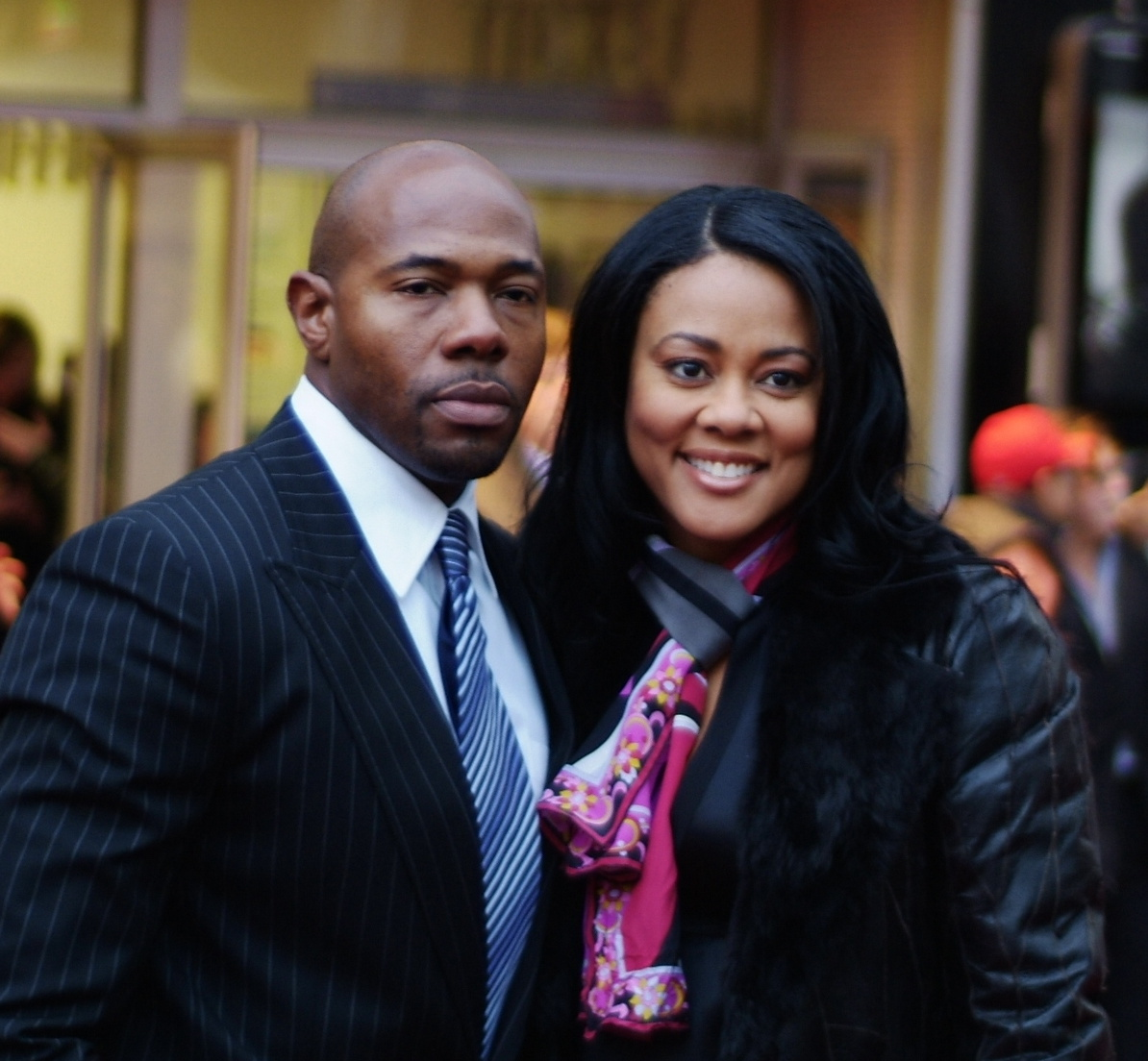
Fuqua with his wife Lela Rochon in 2007

Fuqua and actress Lela Rochon became engaged in 1998 and married on April 9, 1999. They have a daughter and a son. Fuqua also has a son from a previous relationship. He has two granddaughters.

When asked by the BBC in September 2014 whether he believes in God, Fuqua said: "Absolutely."

=== Political activities ===
On October 16, 2023, following the October 7 attacks, Antoine Fuqua, along with other 700 Hollywood figures, signed an open letter in support of Israel.

== Filmography ==
=== Film ===
Year	Title	Director	Producer
1998	The Replacement Killers	Yes	No
2000	Bait	Yes	No
2001	Training Day	Yes	No
2003	Tears of the Sun	Yes	No
2004	King Arthur	Yes	No
2007	Shooter	Yes	No
2009	Brooklyn's Finest	Yes	Executive
2013	Olympus Has Fallen	Yes	Yes
2014	The Equalizer	Yes	No
2015	Southpaw	Yes	Yes
2016	The Magnificent Seven	Yes	Executive
2018	The Equalizer 2	Yes	Yes
2021	Infinite	Yes	Executive
2021	The Guilty	Yes	Yes
2022	Emancipation	Yes	Executive
2022	Bullet Train	No	Yes
2023	The Equalizer 3	Yes	Yes
2024	Rob Peace	No	Yes
2026	Michael	Yes	Executive

=== Television ===
Year	Title			
Year	Title	Director	Executive producer	Notes
2016–17	Ice	Yes	Yes	Episode "Hyenas"
2022	The Terminal List	Yes	Yes	Episode "The Engram"

Executive producer only

- Shooter (2016–2018)
- Training Day (2017)
- The Resident (2018–23)
- FreeRayshawn (2020)
- Mayor of Kingstown (2021–present)
- The Terminal List: Dark Wolf (2025)

=== Documentary works ===
Year	Title			
Year	Title	Director	Producer	Notes
2004	Lightning in a Bottle	Yes	No	
2018	American Dream/American Knightmare	Yes	Yes	TV movie
2019	What's My Name: Muhammad Ali	Yes	Yes	
2021	The Day Sports Stood Still	Yes	Yes	
2022	Legacy: The True Story of the LA Lakers	Yes	Executive	Docuseries
2026	Troublemaker: The Story Behind the Mandela Tapes	Yes	Yes	

Producer only

- Bastards of the Party (2005)
- Forever Brothers: The '71 Pittsburgh Pirates Story (2016)
- Stans (2025)

Directed Academy Award performances
Under Fuqua's direction, these actors have received Academy Award nominations (and one win) for their performances in their respective roles.

Year	Performer	Film	Result
Academy Award for Best Actor
2001	Denzel Washington	Training Day	Won
Academy Award for Best Supporting Actor
2001	Ethan Hawke	Training Day	Nominated

== Music videography ==
Year	Title	Artist(s)	Ref(s)
1990	"I Like the Girls"	Mr. Lee	
1990	"I'll Do 4 U"	Father MC	
1990	"I Just Can't Handle It"	Hi-Five	
1991	"I Like the Way (The Kissing Game)"	Hi-Five	
1991	"I Can't Wait Another Minute"	Hi-Five	
1992	"Love's Taken Over"	Chanté Moore	
1992	"It's Alright"	Chanté Moore	
1992	"You Know What I Like"	El DeBarge	
1992	"All I See"	Christopher Williams	
1992	"Saving Forever for You"	Shanice	
1992	"Goodbye My Love"	Brian McKnight	
1992	"I Can't Go for That"	Brian McKnight	
1992	"Let's Get Smooth"	Calloway	
1992	"Who's the Man?"	Heavy D & the Boyz	
1992	"Oh My Gosh"	Don-E	
1993	"Another Sad Love Song" (Black and White Version, International Version)	Toni Braxton	
1993	"The Morning After"	Maze featuring Frankie Beverly	
1993	"Natalie"	Al B. Sure!	
1993	"Still in Love"	Go West	
1993	"Nobody Does It Betta"	Mint Condition	
1993	"Try My Love"	Jeremy Jordan	
1993	"Get A Little Freaky with Me"	Aaron Hall	
1993	"In Our Love"	Caron Wheeler	
1993	"Angel"	Company	
1994	"Ain't Nobody"	Jaki Graham	
1994	"Somewhere"	Shanice	
1994	"I'm in the Mood"	CeCe Peniston	
1994	"Deep Down"	Ladae	
1994	"The Most Beautiful Girl in the World"	Prince	
1994	"Sending My Love"	Zhané	
1994	"United Front"	Arrested Development	
1995	"For Your Love"	Stevie Wonder	
1995	"Freedom"	Various Artists	
1995	"Gangsta's Paradise"	Coolio	
1996	"Someday"	All-4-One	
1998	"Bedtime (Version 2)"	Usher Raymond	
1999	"Blue Angels"	Pras	
2007	"Citizen/Soldier"	3 Doors Down	
2011	"Mirror"	Lil Wayne	

== Other works ==
=== Commercials ===
- Pirelli – "The Call" (2006), featuring Naomi Campbell and John Malkovich
