= She's Playing Hard to Get =

1992 single by Hi-Five

Single by Hi-Five

from the album Keep It Goin' On
- B-side: "Whenever You Say"
- Released: July 8, 1992
- Genre: New jack swing; funk
- Length: 4:35
- Label: Jive
- Songwriters: Timmy Allen; William Walton
- Producer: Timmy Allen

Hi-Five singles chronology
"Just Another Girlfriend" (1991)	"She's Playing Hard to Get" (1992)	"Quality Time" (1992)

Music video
- "She's Playing Hard to Get" on YouTube

"She's Playing Hard to Get" is a song performed by American contemporary R&B group Hi-Five, released in July 1992 by Jive Records as the lead single from their second album, Keep It Goin' On (1992). The song is written by Timmy Allen and William Walton, and produced by Allen. It peaked at number five on both the US Billboard Hot 100 and Cash Box Top 100 charts. The accompanying music video was directed by Lionel C. Martin. Russell Neal does not appear in the video, as he left the group before the video was filmed.

== Charts ==
Weekly chart performance for "She's Playing Hard to Get"
Chart (1992)	Peak position
Australia (ARIA)	46
Canada Top Singles (RPM)	25
Europe (European Dance Radio)	18
Netherlands (Single Top 100)	76
New Zealand (Recorded Music NZ)	14
UK Singles (Official Charts)	55
UK Dance (Music Week)	14
UK Club Chart (Music Week)	37
US Billboard Hot 100	5
US Hot Dance Music/Maxi-Singles Sales (Billboard)	35
US Hot R&B/Hip-Hop Singles & Tracks (Billboard)	2
US Rhythmic Top 40 (Billboard)	7
US Top 40 Mainstream (Billboard)	10
US Cash Box Top 100	5
