= Unconditional Love (Hi-Five song) =

Single by Hi-Five

from the album Faithful and Menace II Society
- B-side: "Mary, Mary"
- Released: June 1, 1993
- Recorded: 1993
- Genre: R&B; new jack swing
- Length: 5:02 (album version); 4:06 (single edit)
- Label: Jive Records
- Songwriter(s): Larry Campbell
- Producer(s): Art & Rhythm

Hi-Five singles chronology
"Mary, Mary" (1993)	"Unconditional Love" (1993)	"Never Should've Let You Go" (1993)

Music video
- "Unconditional Love" on YouTube

"Unconditional Love" is a song performed by American contemporary R&B group Hi-Five. It initially appeared on the soundtrack to the film Menace II Society and was later included as the closing track on the group's third studio album Faithful. The song peaked at #92 on the Billboard Hot 100 in 1993.

== Music video ==
The official music video for the song was directed by Marcus Nispel.

== Chart positions ==
Chart (1993)	Peak position
US Billboard Hot 100	92
US Hot R&B/Hip-Hop Singles & Tracks (Billboard)	21
