= I Like the Way (The Kissing Game) =

1991 single by Hi-Five

- Standard artwork (vinyl edition pictured)

Single by Hi-Five

from the album Hi-Five
- B-side: "Sweetheart"
- Released: January 2, 1991
- Recorded: January 1990
- Genre: New jack swing; R&B; teen pop
- Length: 5:49 (album version); 3:56 (radio version)
- Label: Jive
- Songwriters: Teddy Riley; Bernard Belle; Dave Way
- Producer: Teddy Riley

Hi-Five singles chronology
"Just Can't Handle It" (1990)	"I Like the Way (The Kissing Game)" (1991)	"I Can't Wait Another Minute" (1991)

Music video
- "I Like the Way (The Kissing Game)" on YouTube

"I Like the Way (The Kissing Game)" is a song recorded by American R&B group Hi-Five on their debut album, Hi-Five (1990). The song was written by Teddy Riley, Bernard Belle and Dave Way, and released as the album's second single on January 2, 1991, by the Jive label. It became a number one Billboard Hot 100 pop song as well as a top-10 hit on the Cash Box Top 100, and was certified Gold by the Recording Industry Association of America (RIAA) on May 10, 1991.

== Chart performance ==
In the United States, "I Like the Way" spent two weeks at number one on the Hot R&B/Hip-Hop Songs chart; and one week at number one on the Billboard Hot 100 chart.

== Music video ==
The official music video for "I Like the Way" was directed by Antoine Fuqua, and the first music video appearance of Toriano Easley’s replacement, Treston Irby.

== Credits and personnel ==
- Written by Teddy Riley, Bernard Belle, Timmy Gatling & Dave Way
- Produced and mixed by Teddy Riley
- Co-produced by Bernard Belle
- Engineered by David Way
- 1. Remixed by Ralph Rolle & Tom Vercillo at Battery Studios
- 3 & 4. Remixed by Gerard Harmon, Armando Colon, & Ralph Rolle at Battery Studios for Phat Kat Productions
- Guitar: Patricia Halligan
- Drums: Ralph Rolle
- Keyboards: Armando Colon
- Little Girl's Voice: India

== Charts ==
=== Weekly charts ===
Chart (1991–1992)	Peak position
Australia (ARIA)	47
Canada Top Singles (RPM)	16
Canada Dance/Urban (RPM)	8
Germany (GfK)	41
Netherlands (Dutch Top 40 Tipparade)	5
Netherlands (Single Top 100)	47
New Zealand (Recorded Music NZ)	43
UK Singles (OCC)	43
UK Dance (Music Week)	44
US Billboard Hot 100	1
US Adult Contemporary (Billboard)	42
US Hot R&B/Hip-Hop Songs (Billboard)	1
US Dance/Electronic Singles Sales (Billboard)	33
US Cash Box Top 100	8

=== Year-end charts ===
Chart (1991)	Position
US Billboard Hot 100	8
US Hot R&B Singles (Billboard)	4

=== All-time charts ===
Chart (1958-2018)	Position
US Billboard Hot 100	317

== See also ==
- List of Billboard Hot 100 number-one singles of the 1990s
- List of number-one R&B singles of 1991 (U.S.)
