= Eric Foster White =

American songwriter, record producer and musician

Eric Foster White (born 1962) is a Grammy-nominated American songwriter, record producer, and musician who has written songs for pop acts such as Whitney Houston, Britney Spears, and the Backstreet Boys. Through his work with artists, White is credited with 70 million album sales worldwide and many hit singles.

== Career ==
White graduated from the University of Miami in 1983 with a bachelor's degree. In the 1980s and early 1990s, White toured as a trombone player with Frank Sinatra, Tony Bennett, and Gloria Estefan. He worked at Sony Music before moving on to Jive Records. He also started two music production-publishing companies. In 2006, White formed Mina Latina Records with DJ Thomas Acosta. Recently, White got into the mobile entertainment industry by creating Showmobile which Hitstreak airs on. Showmobile was signed by Radio Disney via an online carriage agreements in 2014.

== Select discography ==
1. 1991 – "My Name Is Not Susan" (Whitney Houston)
2. 1991 – "I Can't Wait Another Minute" (Hi-Five)
3. 1996 – "Every Time I Close My Eyes" (Backstreet Boys)
4. 1999 – "Soda Pop" (Britney Spears) (song also appeared in Pokémon: The First Movie)
5. 1999 – "From the Bottom of My Broken Heart" (Britney Spears)
6. 1999 – "I Will Still Love You" (duet with Don Philip) (Britney Spears)
7. 1999 – "Thinkin' About You" (Britney Spears)
8. 1999 – "E-Mail My Heart" (Britney Spears)
9. 1999 – "Autumn Goodbye" (Britney Spears)
10. 1999 – "Final Heartbreak" (Jessica Simpson) (song also appeared in Rugrats in Paris)
