= Hi-Five =

American contemporary R&B group

- Origin: Waco, Texas, U.S.
- Genres: R&B; soul; pop; new jack swing
- Years active: 1989–1994; 2005–2007; 2012–present
- Labels: Jive; Giant; N-Depth; Bronx Most Wanted
- Members: Marcus Sanders; Shannon Gill; Treston Irby; Terrence Murphy; Tyron Turner
- Past members: Tony Thompson (deceased); Russell Neal; Roderick Clark (deceased); Toriano Easley; Ricky Smith; Andre Ramseur (aka Dre Wonda); Billy Covington; Faruq Evans

Hi-Five is an American R&B quintet from Waco, Texas. Hi-Five had a No. 1 hit on Billboard's Hot 100 in 1991 with "I Like the Way (The Kissing Game)".

The band was originally formed in 1989 as a trio: childhood friends Tony Thompson, Russell Neal, and Oklahoma native, Toriano Easley. Jive Records suggested adding childhood friends, Roderick "Pooh" Clark and Marcus Sanders, to the ensemble and later signed these founding members as Hi-Five.

During the release of their debut album, Toriano Easley was charged with a crime, which involved a dispute with his neighborhood friends, rendering him unable to continue with the group. The record label recruited New York native Treston Irby, as a replacement member. After the release of their second album, Russell Neal left the group after financial conflicts with the label. While the remaining four members of the group were continuing to tour, Roderick "Pooh" Clark was injured in a vehicle collision, leaving him paralyzed from the neck down, resulting in his departure from the group. The label added Shannon Gill and Terrence Murphy as replacement members.

When the group decided to accept an offer from Giant Records to change labels, while their Jive contract was still pending, Giant Records, instead decided to focus their attention on lead singer Tony Thompson, neglecting the projects related to the group. Because of this discrepancy, the group disbanded. Tony Thompson was later signed to Bad Boy Records. In 2005, without consulting the initial members of Hi-Five, Tony Thompson put together several new vocalists to form a new incarnation of the band, under the Hi-Five name. This later resulted in a legal battle, between Thompson and former Hi-Five members. In 2007, Thompson died from drug-related circumstances. In 2012, as a result of Thompson's passing, former members of Hi-Five decided to reunite in Thompson's honor.

== Early career ==
Hi-Five was originally signed to Jive Records in late 1989 and released their eponymous debut album in 1990. The album was produced by Teddy Riley and went platinum. It included singles "I Just Can't Handle It" (R&B No. 10), "I Can't Wait Another Minute" (Pop No. 8, R&B No.1) and "I Like the Way (The Kissing Game)", which went to number one on the U.S. Billboard Hot 100 and the U.S. Hot R&B/Hip-Hop Songs chart (making it their biggest hit to date).

The group's second LP, Keep It Goin' On, was released in 1992. Though not as successful as their debut effort, several tracks from this album, including "She's Playing Hard to Get" (Pop No. 5, R&B No. 2) and the R. Kelly-penned "Quality Time" (Pop No. 38, R&B No. 3) got major airplay in East Coast (US) urban markets. Shortly after this album was released, the group was involved in a vehicular accident, which left Roderick "Pooh" Clark paralyzed from the chest down.

In 1993, Hi-Five emerged with a third album, Faithful, which featured the songs "Unconditional Love" (Pop No. 92, R&B No. 21) and "Never Should've Let You Go" (Pop No. 30, R&B No. 10). "Unconditional Love" was also featured in the multi-platinum Menace II Society soundtrack, and received extensive airplay on urban contemporary stations throughout the summer of 1993 as the movie increased in popularity. "Never Should've Let You Go" was featured on the Sister Act 2 soundtrack.

== Later career ==
On June 1, 2007, Tony Thompson's body was discovered by security officers at around 10 p.m. near an air-conditioning unit outside of an apartment complex in his native Waco, Texas. An autopsy later determined that he had died from "toxic effects of chlorodifluoromethane", or inhaling a toxic amount of freon. He is buried at Doris Miller Memorial Park in Waco.

In 2011, Treston Irby released his debut solo single "Everything" under the mantle Tru$ on his independent label, Bronx Most Wanted Ent.

In 2012, Irby, Shannon Gill and Marcus Sanders reformed Hi-Five with two new members, Andre Ramseur (aka Dre Wonda) and Faruq Evans. They released a single called "Favorite Girl" also on the BMW label. Ramseur later left the group and was replaced by Billy Covington.

On July 2, 2014, former Hi-Five member Russell Neal was charged with murder, over the fatal stabbing of his wife, model Catherine Martinez, in Houston.

Hi-Five was featured on the TVOne music documentary series Unsung on August 6, 2014, chronicling the quintet's upbringing in Waco, their rise to superstardom, tragedies among group members, and their comeback.

Former member Roderick “Pooh” Clark died on April 17, 2022, at the age of 49.

== Discography ==
=== Studio albums ===
Year	Album details	Peak chart positions			Certifications
Year	Album details	US	US R&B	AUS	Certifications
1990	Hi-Five: Release date: September 25, 1990; Label: Jive	38	1	102	US: Platinum
1992	Keep It Goin' On: Release date: August 11, 1992; Label: Jive	82	9	—	US: Gold
1993	Faithful: Release date: October 15, 1993; Label: Jive	105	23	—	
2005	The Return: Release date: October 11, 2005; Label: N' Depth Entertainment	—	—	—	
2017	Legacy: Release date: January 6, 2017; Label: Bronx Most Wanted Entertainment	—	—	—	
"—" denotes a recording that did not chart or was not released in that territory.

=== EP ===
Year	Title
2014	The EP: Release date: August 5, 2014; Label: Bronx Most Wanted Entertainment

=== Compilation albums ===
Year	Album details
1994	Greatest Hits: Released: October 11, 1994; Label: Jive

=== Singles ===
Year	Single	Peak chart positions								Certifications	Album
Year	Single	US	US R&B	US A/C	AUS	GER	NLD	NZ	UK	Certifications	Album
1990	"I Just Can't Handle It"	—	3	—	—	—	—	20	—		Hi-Five
1991	"I Like the Way (The Kissing Game)"	1	1	42	47	41	47	43	43	US: Gold	Hi-Five
1991	"I Can't Wait Another Minute"	8	1	30	112	—	—	—	—		Hi-Five
1991	"Just Another Girlfriend"	88	41	—	107	—	—	—	—		Hi-Five
1992	"She's Playing Hard to Get"	5	2	—	46	—	76	14	55		Keep It Goin' On
1992	"Quality Time"	38	3	—	114	—	—	36	—		Keep It Goin' On
1993	"Mary, Mary"	—	50	—	—	—	—	—	—		Keep It Goin' On
1993	"Unconditional Love"	92	21	—	—	—	—	—	—		Faithful
1993	"Never Should've Let You Go"	30	10	—	—	—	—	38	—		Faithful
1994	"Faithful"	—	52	—	—	—	—	—	—		Faithful
1994	"What Can I Say to You (To Justify My Love)" (with Nuttin' Nyce)	—	13	—	—	—	—	—	—		Faithful
2012	"Favorite Girl"	—	—	36	—	—	—	—	—		Legacy
2013	"You Never Know"	—	—	—	—	—	—	—	—		Legacy
2014	"It's Nothing"	—	—	—	—	—	—	—	—		Legacy
2015	"Different Kiss"	—	—	—	—	—	—	—	—		Legacy
2015	"Sunshine"	—	—	—	—	—	—	—	—		Legacy
2015	"Hi-Five Christmas"	—	—	—	—	—	—	—	—		Legacy
2016	"Kit Kat"	—	—	—	—	—	—	—	—		Legacy
2024	"Slow Grind" (with H-Town)	—	—	—	—	—	—	—	—		
"—" denotes a recording that did not chart or was not released in that territory.

== Music videos ==
Year	Video	Director
1990	"I Just Can't Handle It"	Antoine Fuqua
1991	"I Like the Way (The Kissing Game)"	Antoine Fuqua
1991	"I Can't Wait Another Minute"	
1991	"Just Another Girlfriend"	
1992	"She's Playing Hard to Get"	Lionel C. Martin
1992	"Quality Time"	
1993	"Unconditional Love"	Marcus Nispel
1993	"Never Should've Let You Go"	Marcus Nispel
1994	"Faithful"	
1994	"What Can I Say to You (To Justify My Love)" (w/ Nuttin Nyce)	
2012	"Favorite Girl"	Treston Irby
2013	"You Never Know"	Christian Marcus & Treston Irby
2015	"Different Kiss"	Colin Keith & Treston Irby
2015	"Sunshine"	Mark Geohagen & Treston Irby
2015	"Christmas"	Mark Geohagen & Hi-Five
2016	"Kit Kat"	
