= 702 discography =

- Studio albums: 3
- Singles: 14

American R&B girl group 702 has released three studio albums, and fourteen singles, including two as featured artists.

702 first charted in August 1996, and released their debut album No Doubt in the United States in October 1996 and it peaked at number 82 on the Billboard 200. It earned a gold certification in the United States by the Recording Industry Association of America (RIAA). The album's lead single, "Steelo", reached number thirty-two on the Billboard Hot 100 and was certified gold by the RIAA, selling 514,000 copies. The album's second single "Get It Together" reached number ten on Billboard Hot 100. The single sold 813,000 copies and was also certified gold by the RIAA. The group's second album, 702, was released in June 1999, and was their breakthrough release peaking at number 34 on the Billboard 200. The album's lead single "Where My Girls At?" peaked in the top-five on the US Billboard Hot 100. The album eventually sold over a million copies in the United States, gaining platinum certification by the RIAA.

The group's third and final album, Star, was released in the spring of 2003 and reached number forty-five on Billboard 200. The album sold 21,000 copies in its first week. To date, 702 has sold over 4 million records worldwide.

== Studio albums ==
List of albums, with selected chart positions, sales figures and certifications
Title	Details	Peak chart positions					Sales	Certifications
Title	Details	US	US R&B	GER	NL	UK	Sales	Certifications
No Doubt	Released: October 8, 1996; Formats: CD, cassette, digital download	82	24	—	—	—	US: 376,000	RIAA: Gold
702	Released: June 15, 1999; Formats: CD, digital download	34	7	80	90	112	US: 1,050,000	RIAA: Platinum; MC: Gold
Star	Released: March 25, 2003; Formats: CD, digital download	45	22	—	—	—	US: 21,000	
"—" denotes a recording that did not chart or was not released in that territory.

== Singles ==
=== As lead artist ===
List of singles, with selected chart positions and certifications, showing year released and album name
Title	Year	Peak chart positions							Certifications	Album
Title	Year	US	US R&B	AUS	GER	NL	NZ	UK	Certifications	Album
"Steelo" (featuring Missy Elliott)	1996	32	12	—	—	—	23	41	RIAA: Gold	No Doubt
"Get It Together"	1997	10	3	—	—	—	8	—	RIAA: Gold	No Doubt
"All I Want"	1997	35	33	—	—	—	—	—		No Doubt
"No Doubt"	1997	—	—	—	—	—	35	59		No Doubt
"Where My Girls At?"	1999	4	3	65	21	17	22	22	RIAA: Gold; RMNZ: Gold	702
"You Don't Know"	1999	—	50	—	90	60	—	36		702
"Gotta Leave"	2000	—	58	—	—	—	—	—		702
"Pootie Tangin'"	2001	—	—	—	—	—	—	—		Pootie Tang
"Star" (featuring Clipse)	2002	—	98	—	—	—	—	—		Star
"I Still Love You" (featuring Pharrell)	2003	—	49	—	—	—	—	—		Star
"Blah Blah Blah Blah"	2003	—	—	—	—	—	—	—		Star
"Trouble"	2003	—	—	—	—	—	—	—		Star
"—" denotes a recording that did not chart or was not released in that territory.

=== As featured artist ===
List of singles, with selected chart positions and certifications, showing year released and album name
Title	Year	Peak chart positions				Certifications	Album
Title	Year	US	US R&B	NZ	UK	Certifications	Album
"This Lil' Game We Play" (Subway featuring 702)	1994	15	4	—	—	RIAA: Gold	Good Times
"Beep Me 911" (Missy Elliott featuring 702 and Magoo)	1998	—	—	13	14		Supa Dupa Fly
"—" denotes a recording that did not chart or was not released in that territory.

== Soundtrack appearances ==
Title	Year	Album	Record label
"All I Want"	1997	Good Burger	Capitol
"Finding My Way"	1999	Our Friend, Martin	Motown
"He Rules"	1999	Stuart Little	Motown
"Pootie Tangin'"	2001	Pootie Tang	Hollywood
"I Still Love You"	2002	Empire	Hollywood
"Blah Blah Blah Blah"	2003	Malibu's Most Wanted	Universal

== Album appearances ==
Title	Year	Album
"The Lil' Game We Play" (Subway featuring 702)	1995	Good Times
"Don't Front/Let's Chill" (Shyheim featuring 702)	1996	The Lost Generation
"Beep Me 911" (Missy Elliott featuring 702 and Magoo)	1997	Supa Dupa Fly
"Gamble It" (Sirena featuring 702)	2003	Emotions
"Up in the Club" (Excell featuring Spice1 and 702, produced by Dj)	2006	E Sharp Presents

=== Kameelah Williams (backing vocals) ===
Title	Year	Album
"Take Away" (with Missy Elliott, Ginuwine and Tweet)	2001	Miss E ...So Addictive
"You Gets No Love" (with Faith Evans, Loon and P. Diddy)	2001	Faithfully
"Burnin' Up" (with Faith Evans and Loon)	2001	Faithfully
"Don't Cry" (with Faith Evans)	2001	Faithfully
"I Should Let You Go" (produced by Stevie J)	2014	Non-album singles
"Give It to You" (featuring Musiq Soulchild)	2015	Non-album singles
"Stupid in Love"	2016	Non-album singles
"Now You're Mad"	2018	Non-album singles
"Desert Love"	2018	Non-album singles

=== LeMisha Grinstead as "LeMisha 702" (lead and backing vocals) ===
Title	Year	Album
"What I Got" (produced by E Sharp)	2007	E Sharp Presents vol. II
