= Hi-Hat (choreographer) =

American choreographer

Nadine "Hi-Hat" Ruffin is a choreographer of hip-hop dance from New York City. She has worked with Montell Jordan, Big Time Rush, Teddy Riley, P-Diddy, Wyclef, Shakira, Rihanna, Mary J. Blige, Eve, and Jay-Z. Ruffin's work is featured in many Missy Elliott music videos, such as "All n My Grill", "She's a Bitch", "Hit Em wit da Hee", "Sock It To Me", "Beep Me 911", "Get Ur Freak On", and "One Minute Man". Ruffin has served as a guest judge on the American dance competition reality TV series So You Think You Can Dance.

== Filmography ==
Ruffin has choreographed the following television shows and movies:

- Bring It On
- Step Up 3-D
- Step Up 2
- The Ellen DeGeneres Show
- Late Night with Jimmy Fallon
- Lopez Tonight
- 2009 American Music Awards
- Late Show with David Letterman
- Saturday Night Live
- Jimmy Kimmel Live!
- MTV Video Music Awards
- America's Got Talent
- The Oprah Winfrey Show
- The 51st Annual Grammy Awards
- Kung Fu Panda
- 4th Annual VH1 Hip Hop Honors
- I Now Pronounce You Chuck & Larry
- How She Move
- Stick It
- Chicken Little
- The 2nd Annual Vibe Awards
- Shark Tale
- The Girl Next Door
- The Nick at Nite Holiday Special
- The Hot Chick
- Clockstoppers
- Charlie's Angels
- The Rugrats Movie
