= Good Burger 2 =

2023 film by Phil Traill

- Release poster
- Directed by: Phil Traill
- Written by: Kevin Kopelow; Heath Seifert
- Based on: Characters created by: Dan Schneider; Kevin Kopelow; Heath Seifert
- Produced by: Kenan Thompson; Kel Mitchell
- Starring: Kenan Thompson; Kel Mitchell
- Cinematography: Jay Hunter
- Edited by: Christian Hoffman
- Music by: Oak Felder
- Production companies: Nickelodeon Movies; Artists for Artists
- Distributed by: Paramount+
- Release date: November 22, 2023
- Running time: 90 minutes
- Country: United States
- Language: English

Good Burger 2 is a 2023 American comedy film directed by Phil Traill, written by the writing team of Kevin Kopelow and Heath Seifert, and produced by and starring Kenan Thompson and Kel Mitchell. It serves as a sequel to Good Burger (1997), which was based on a comedy sketch featured on the Nickelodeon series All That. The story follows Dexter Reed reuniting with Ed at his old workplace Good Burger, where the pair unveils a secret involving a successor to their old rival restaurant.

Talks of a sequel for Good Burger occurred in 2018 through the interest of both Thompson and Mitchell, three years after the pair were reunited in a sketch on The Tonight Show Starring Jimmy Fallon in 2015. The sequel was officially announced in March 2023. Kopelow and Seifert, the co-creators of the original sketch and co-writers of the first film, were hired to write the screenplay, and Traill was confirmed to be directing. Thompson and Mitchell were also confirmed to be returning as Dexter Reed and Ed, respectively. The film was produced by Nickelodeon Movies and Artists for Artists, and was filmed from May to June of that same year, mirroring the same production window as the original. Record producer Oak Felder was hired to compose the film's score.

Good Burger 2 was released on November 22, 2023, on the streaming service Paramount+, and received mixed reviews.

== Plot ==
26 years after the events of the first film, Dexter Reed has quit Good Burger in the hopes of becoming a successful entrepreneur, but his ideas turn out to be failures. His latest invention, a spray that can make any material flame-retardant, backfires as he attempts to showcase the material on his own house in a demonstration for investors, including Mark Cuban, that ends up burning it down. Left without a home and business, Dexter looks to move in with his sister Charlotte, but she refuses as she is one of his investors. He then calls Ed, who still works at Good Burger and agrees to let him stay at his home.

Dexter visits Good Burger to find numerous new employees: twins Cindy and Mindy; the elderly Ruth; Ed's son Ed 2, who looks and acts exactly like Ed; and Dexter's niece Mia, Charlotte's daughter who wants nothing to do with Dexter. The restaurant has a new manager named Mr. Jensen. In addition to working as the cashier, Ed is now the owner due to his love of the restaurant. The only familiar employee is Fizz, whom Ed had accidentally left in the freezer for 22 years and is thawed out. At Ed's home, Dexter meets Ed's family: his wife Edie and their numerous other children who look like Ed and are named after condiments. Dexter is shocked to find that Roxanne, who previously tried to seduce Ed for the recipe for his sauce for Mondo Burger, now works as their nanny.

Dexter decides to work at Good Burger again while considering his next entrepreneurial venture. When he pitches his permanent ice idea to Mia, she laughs it off. Meanwhile, Ed has been hounded by Cecil McNevin, a lawyer for the conglomerate MegaCorp, to turn Good Burger into a global franchise, but Ed is uncertain. MegaCorp sends a pair of goons to force Ed into signing the agreement, but Ed's natural clumsiness gets them hurt. Cecil tries to appeal to Dexter, explaining their intent is to expand Good Burger but not to take it away from Ed and are planning to give the employees big raises. Dexter considers it based on the financial benefit and then brings Ed to lunch with Cecil to explain the deal and they both agree to sign.

At the franchise launch party, Cecil reveals that the flagship store is being shut down with their employees being fired as mandated by the contract, which Dexter and Ed had failed to read before signing. With everyone turning against Dexter, he takes Ed to MegaCorp headquarters to demand they reinstate the flagship restaurant and rehire the employees. They meet with the CEO Katt Bozwell, the sister of former Mondo Burger owner Kurt Bozwell who wants revenge on Good Burger after sending Kurt away to prison. She is planning to rebrand the restaurant Mega Good Burger and has plans to replace all employees with robot versions of Ed. After destroying the Good Burger car, MegaCorp sends them home in a self-driving delivery car which Katt sends out of control to get rid of them. Dexter forces the car to drive in a circle until it runs out of power.

Lamenting his failures, Dexter gets Ed to rally the Good Burger employees to stop the launch of Mega Good Burger. They plan to infiltrate MegaCorp headquarters so Mia, a computer expert, can shut down the machines before the launch. While Dexter, Ed, and Mia infiltrate the building, the other employees create a distraction, but their ruse is discovered. Dexter and Ed get separated from Mia and find the control room while Mia is trapped on a conveyor belt. Dexter goes off to find Mia, leaving Ed to shut down the restaurants. Dexter saves Mia, but they are captured and taken to the control room where Ed is also taken. As Katt gives the first demonstration on national television, the robotic Ed throws food at her, followed by the other machines shooting food at everyone at every location around the world, due to Ed reprogramming the machines to go haywire.

In the aftermath, MegaCorp is shut down and Ed is given back ownership of the original Good Burger. Charlotte comes to visit Dexter and Mia and Dexter is allowed to apologize to her. Ed and Ed 2 reveal to Dexter that they figured out how to make permanent ice and Good Burger successfully sells it to Mark Cuban, making $10,000,000.00.

== Cast ==
- Kel Mitchell as Ed, the current owner of Good Burger and Dexter's best friend
- Kenan Thompson as Dexter Reed, a former Good Burger employee who rejoined the workplace
- Kamaia Fairburn as Mia, Dexter's niece
- Alex R. Hibbert as Ed 2, Ed's son
- Fabrizio Guido as Mr. Jensen, the current manager of Good Burger
- Emily Hinkler as Cindy and Lindy, workers at Good Burger
- Elizabeth Hinkler as Mindy, the twin sister of Cindy who works at Good Burger
- Anabel Graetz as Ruth, an elderly worker at Good Burger
- Leslie Jones as Charlotte, Dexter's sister and Mia's mother
- Liza Koshy as Wilma, a technician at MegaCorp
- Rob Gronkowski as an inconvenienced customer
- Kai Cenat as a disgruntled customer
- Marsai Martin as a friendly customer
- Pete Davidson as an angry customer
- Ego Nwodim as Edie, Ed's wife
- Nicole Byer as Luna Foxx, Mia’s idol and an aspiring rapper
- Lil Rel Howery as Cecil McNevin, a lawyer for the corporation MegaCorp
- Jillian Bell as Katt Bozwell, the CEO of MegaCorp and the younger sister of Kurt Bozwell
- Lori Beth Denberg as Connie Muldoon, a patron of Good Burger
- Carmen Electra as Roxanne, Kurt Bozwell's former henchwoman who now works as a nanny for Ed's children
- Josh Server as Fizz, the former drive-thru employee of Good Burger who was frozen for twenty-two years
- Adrian M. Mompoint as a tough MegaCorp goon
- Ricky Velez as a scrawny MegaCorp goon
- Ron Funches as Jimathy
- Molly Kearney as Alex, a security guard at MegaCorp
- Michael Longfellow as Oscar, a technician at MegaCorp
- Sofia Black-D'Elia as Maria
- Matt Friend as a serious waiter
- Flula Borg as Food Dude, a German social media influencer
- Phil Traill as Mark Machray

=== Cameos ===
- Mark Cuban
- Yung Gravy
- Nicole Richie
- Zoe Saldaña
- Andy Samberg
- Maya Rudolph
- Bowen Yang
- Chrissy Teigen
- Darryl 'DMC' McDaniels
- Shar Jackson
- Shaun White
- Mikey Day
- Danny Tamberelli
- George Clinton
- Al Roker
- Kai Cenat

=== Voices ===
- Sinbad as Dexter's business manager; he previously portrayed Mr. Wheat in the first film
- Alexa Kahn as Burgers, Beverages, & Sauces
- James III as Burger
- David Chen as French Fries and Sauces

Additionally, Abe Vigoda, Ron Lester, Ginny Schreiber and Jan Schweiterman appear as Otis, Spatch, Deedee and Kurt Bozwell respectively in photos from the first Good Burger film. Shar Jackson, who cameos as herself, also appears in the photos as her character Monique.

== Production ==
=== Development ===
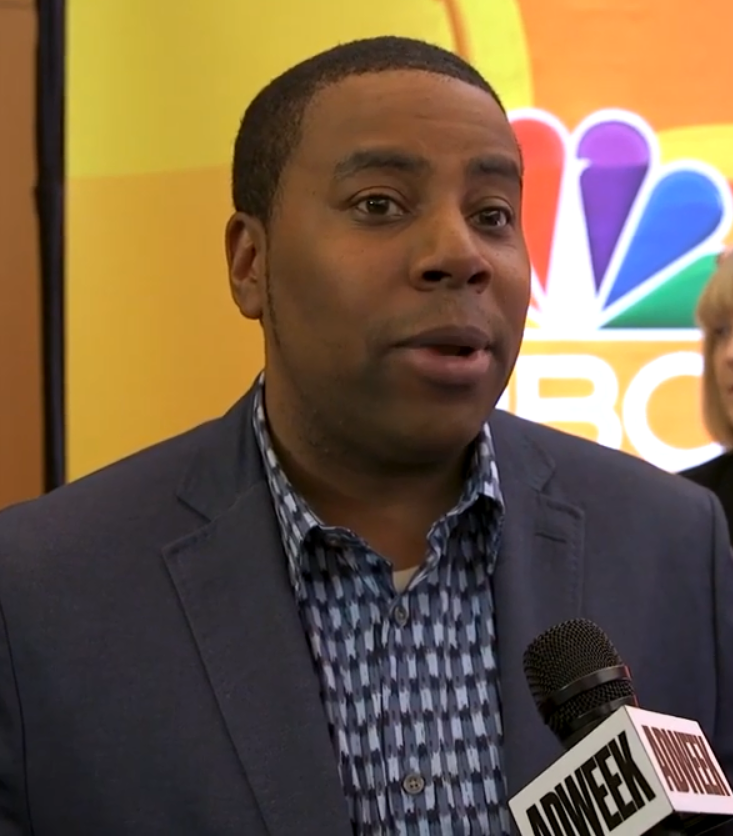
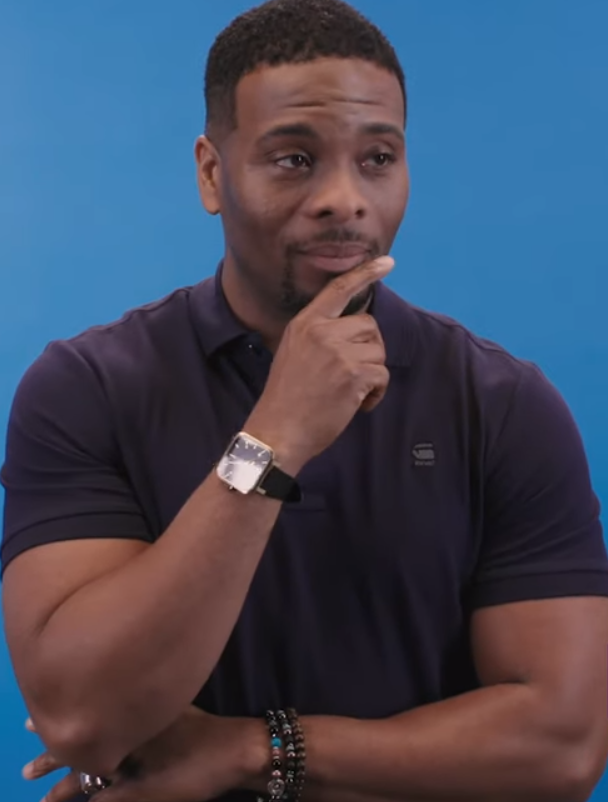
Two of the original film's stars, Kenan Thompson and Kel Mitchell, reprised their roles as Dexter Reed and Ed for the first time after their 2015 reunion together.

In 1998, Aladdin Paperbacks published a children's novel, Good Burger 2 Go, that served as a sequel to the original film. The book, written by Steve Holland, featured Ed following a short-changed customer around the globe. On September 23, 2015, both Kenan Thompson and Kel Mitchell made a "Good Burger" sketch for a reunion on The Tonight Show Starring Jimmy Fallon. In March 2018, Mitchell said there were talks on a Good Burger 2, and in December, he and Thompson said they are open for a potential sequel or reboot.

In December 2021, the director of the original film and then-CEO of Paramount Pictures, Brian Robbins, revealed he wanted to create an animated series based on Good Burger for the Paramount+ streaming service, and hoped to have Thompson and Mitchell involved in some capacity. Mitchell expressed an interest in reviving Good Burger, due to his youngest son being a fan of the film. In August 2022, shortly after receiving his star on the Hollywood Walk of Fame, Thompson confirmed that he and Mitchell were working on the sequel. During the 74th Primetime Emmy Awards where Thompson served as host, the duo once again hinted the sequel after performing a skit with Kumail Nanjiani. In October 2022, Thompson confirmed that the screenplay was finished, with him and Mitchell teasing the script in a joint Instagram post. In March 2023, both Thompson and Mitchell officially announced the sequel's title as Good Burger 2, in addition to both actors reprising their roles as Dexter Reed and Ed.

The film was dedicated to two of the original Good Burger cast members, Abe Vigoda and Ron Lester, who both died in 2016, as well as rapper Coolio (performer of the original theme song for the sitcom Kenan & Kel) and singer Irish Grinstead from 702 (performers of the promotional single from the Good Burger soundtrack), who died in 2022 and 2023 respectively.

=== Filming ===
Principal photography took place from May 18, 2023, to late June in North Providence, Rhode Island. A former Friendly's restaurant was used to stand in for Good Burger.

== Release ==
Good Burger 2 released on Paramount+ on November 22, 2023, in the United States and Canada. It was released on November 23, 2023, in the United Kingdom and Australia.

=== Home media ===
The film was released on DVD and Blu-ray by Paramount Home Entertainment on March 26, 2024.

=== Soundtrack ===
The soundtrack was released on November 22, 2023. It featured Vic Mensa, Maeta, Wiz Khalifa, Yung Gravy, Teezo Touchdown, Paul Russell, Wé Ani, Trey Makai, Jutes, NoiseOfCory and Kel Mitchell.

== Reception ==
On the review aggregator website Rotten Tomatoes, 59% of 17 critics' reviews are positive, with an average rating of 5.7/10. Metacritic, which uses a weighted average, assigned the film a score of 48 out of 100, based on 6 critics, indicating "mixed or average" reviews.

Murtada Elfadl of Variety criticized the lack of use of Thompson in the film, saying: "The sequel denies him a showcase for his obvious comedic talent. Forced into playing the straight man to Mitchell's more flashy character, Thompson ends up explaining the wacky shenanigans happening instead of doing anything comedic. Almost every nonsensical line Mitchell utters is followed by a sober explanation from Thompson, suggesting the writers don't trust the audience to get the obvious jokes". He also took issue with the underused cameos of other SNL cast, labeling them "wasted one-scene characters". He ended his review saying, "When a fast food sequel takes this long to make, it ought to come out tasting a lot better than Good Burger 2".

Jennifer Green reviewing for Common Sense Media gave the film a score of three out of five and wrote "Mitchell, Thompson, Howery, and Bell are all comical in their over-the-top roles, though Mitchell's Ed is funnier if viewed as single-minded rather than just simple (or even intellectually challenged)".

=== Audience viewership ===
Good Burger 2 debuted at number one as the most-watched domestic launch in its first three days for an original film in Paramount+ history, as of December 2023. Viewership for the film was up 50% compared to the previous record holder, Pet Sematary: Bloodlines.

== Potential future ==
Director Phil Traill told the Radio Times in November 2023, that there were plans for a third film and other sequels:

The character of Ed has not changed [...] he now has a family, he's got a bunch of kids and a wife, but he is still the same old Ed. As that doesn't change, we can just do it again and again and put them in crazier and crazier situations. There's plans afoot for various things. I don't think it has to be limited to a trilogy, it can go on.
