= Kel Mitchell =

American actor and comedian (born 1978)

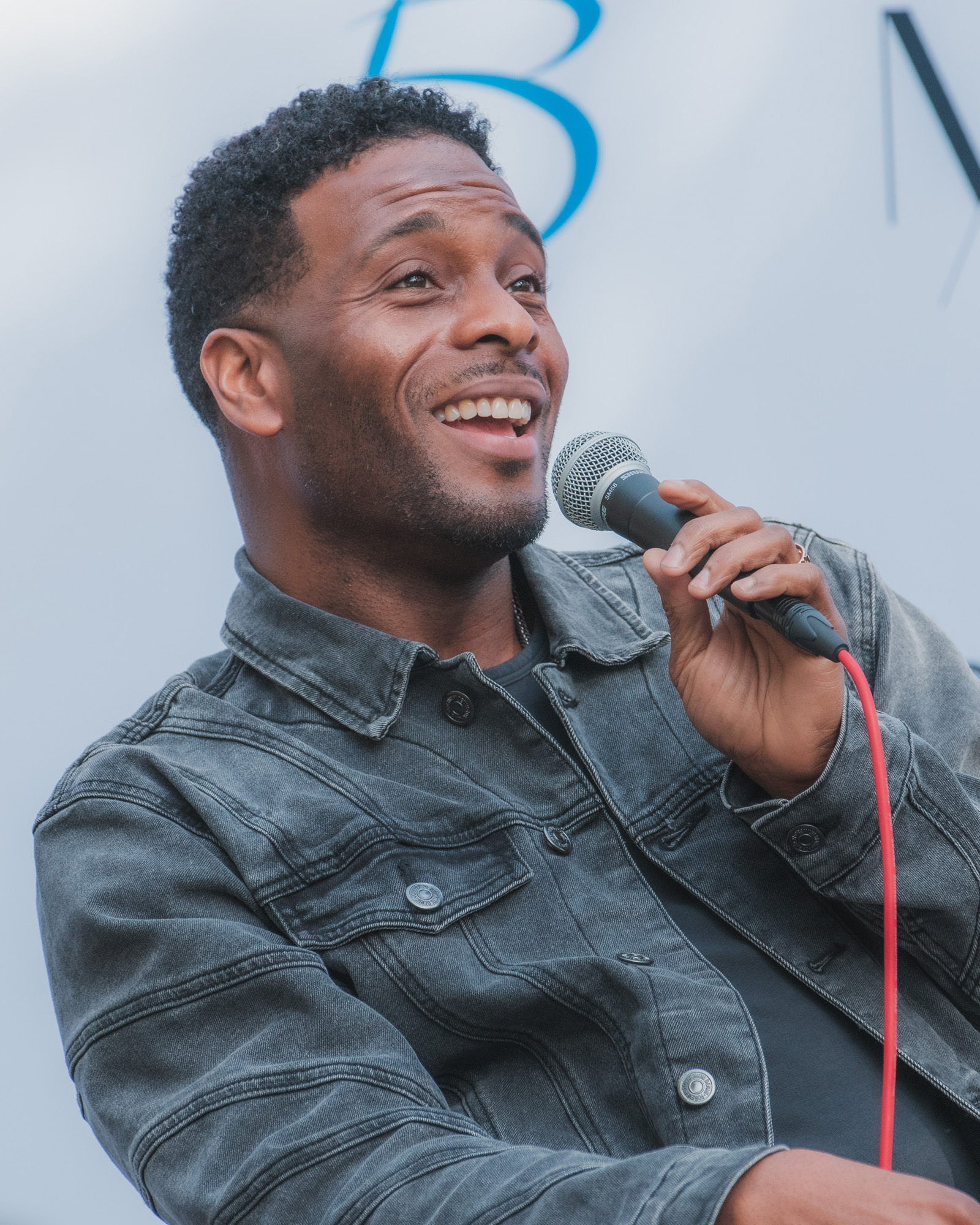
- Mitchell in 2025
- Born: Kel Johari Rice Mitchell; August 25, 1978 (age 48); Chicago, Illinois, U.S.
- Occupations: Actor; comedian; rapper; singer; television personality
- Years active: 1994–present
- Known for: Ed in Good Burger & Good Burger 2 Kel Kimble in Kenan & Kel; Peezy B in Sam and Cat; Double G in Game Shakers
- Spouses: Tyisha Mitchell (m. 1999; div. 2005); Asia Lee (m. 2012)
- Children: 4
- Website: kelmitchell.com

Kel Johari Rice Mitchell (born August 25, 1978) is an American actor, comedian, rapper, singer, and TV host. He was an original cast member of the Nickelodeon sketch comedy series All That for its first five seasons (1994–1999), where he was often paired with Kenan Thompson. He co-starred with Thompson on the Nickelodeon sitcom Kenan & Kel from 1996 to 2000. From 2015 to 2019, he starred as Double G on the Nickelodeon sitcom Game Shakers.

== Early life ==
Mitchell was born August 25, 1978, in Chicago, Illinois, and is from the South Side. He attended Chicago Vocational High School and took drama classes at the ETA Creative Arts Foundation. He has two sisters, Kenyatta and Kyra.

== Career ==
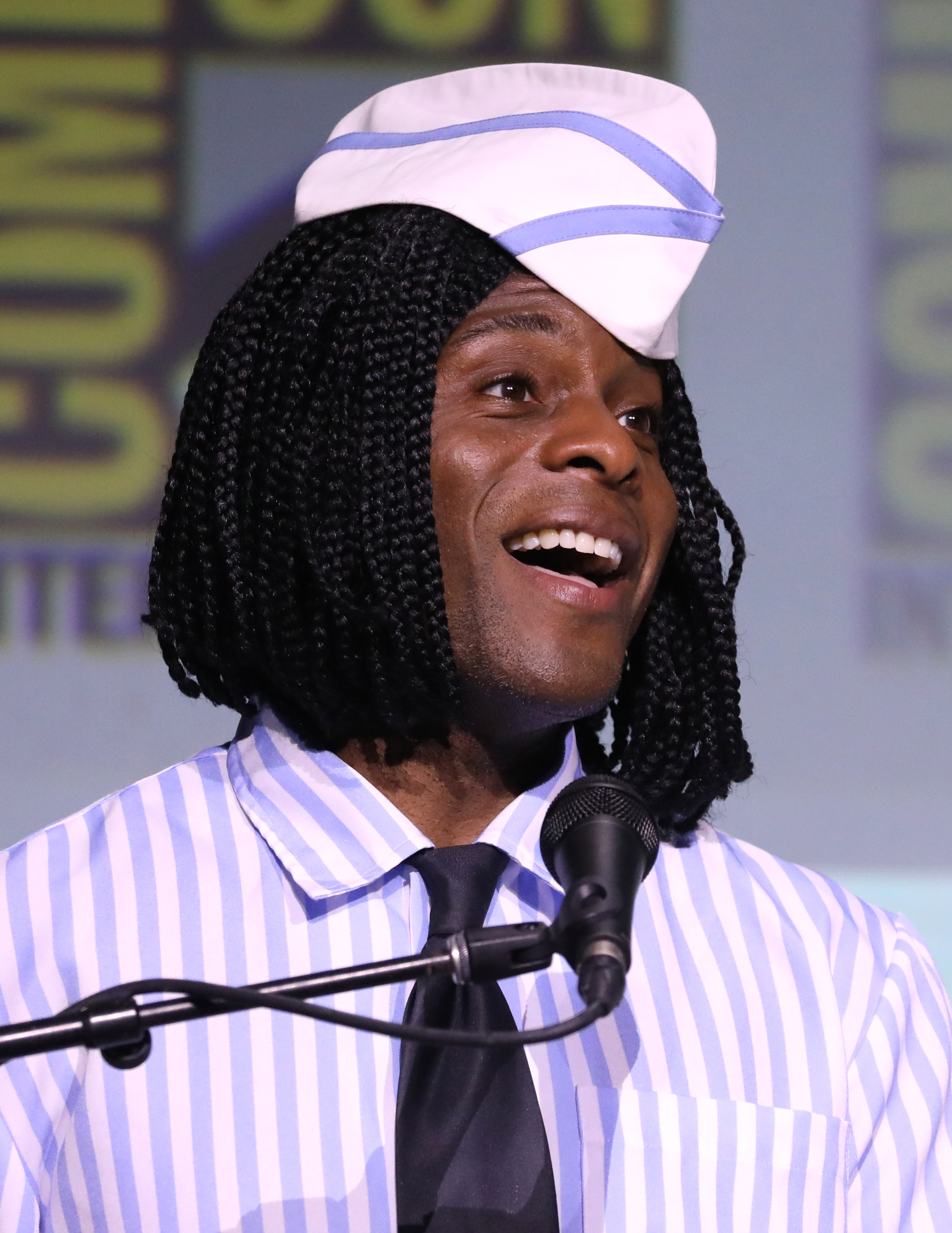
Mitchell dressed as Ed from Good Burger at the 2024 San Diego Comic-Con

Mitchell started his acting career alongside Kenan Thompson at the age of 15, in the Nickelodeon comedy sketch series All That, from 1994 to 1999. He and Thompson worked on the series Kenan & Kel from 1996 to 2000. They starred in the 1997 film Good Burger, which grew out of one of Mitchell's sketches from All That. The duo appeared together in an episode of Sister, Sister with Tia and Tamera Mowry, four episodes of The Steve Harvey Show, and in a special two-part episode of Cousin Skeeter. They were also featured in an episode of Sabrina, the Teenage Witch.

Outside of his ventures with Kenan Thompson, Mitchell provided the voice of a mild-mannered and playful dog named T-Bone in the children's cartoon series Clifford the Big Red Dog, alongside John Ritter, from 2000 to 2003. Additionally, he made an appearance in the 2004 Kanye West music video "All Falls Down" as a valet. Mitchell co-hosted Dance 360 with Fredro Starr; the show lasted for only one season. From 2005 until 2006, Mitchell portrayed Manny Sellers in the sitcom One on One, and in 2007 Mitchell starred in BET's Take the Cake. Some of his other credits include Honeydripper and Mystery Men. In 2003, both Mitchell and his Kenan & Kel co-star Kenan Thompson auditioned for Saturday Night Live, but only Thompson made the cut. In 2006, Mitchell was the subject of a death hoax, when a rumor was spread around Myspace.

In March 2008, he filmed his writing and producing debut, Dance Fu, in which he also starred as the lead role. Also in 2008, Mitchell appeared in two Detroit-based stage productions, Affairs and Laundromat, the latter written by Carlos Faison and also starred comedian Buddy Lewis, Leanne "Lelee" Lyons of R&B group SWV, celebrity impersonator/stage actor Matt Macis, and vocalist and performer Lauren "Lexxi" Alexis. Mitchell was a part of G4's Attack of the Show!, playing various characters. He also has a recurring role on the PBS Kids show Curious George.

Mitchell appeared at the 2011 Comikaze Expo with several of his All That cast members, and has appeared in numerous panels of the same kind since, including at New York Comic Con in 2015, and filmed segments with them for the show's 22nd anniversary celebration on The Splat in April 2016. Mitchell guest starred on Sam & Cat as rapper Peezy B, in the episode "#PeezyB".

Mitchell was a cast member on Dan Schneider's sitcom Game Shakers, which premiered on Nickelodeon on September 12, 2015. Mitchell played the role of Double G, a rap superstar and business partner of the Game Shakers company. Around the same time, Mitchell also guest starred in an episode of the Adult Swim show Loiter Squad, and in an episode of TV One's Love That Girl!. He also wrote and directed the inspirational film She Is Not My Sister, and produced several music videos.

On September 23, 2015, Mitchell appeared on The Tonight Show Starring Jimmy Fallon in a skit featuring his iconic role as Ed from Good Burger. Mitchell was also reunited with his former Kenan & Kel co-star Kenan Thompson, who reprised his role as "Lester Oakes, Construction Worker". They later competed against one another in an episode of the revived Nickelodeon game show Double Dare that aired in November 2018. They also teamed as executive producers for the reboot of All That which premiered in June 2019 and ran until 2020. Mitchell also returned as a recurring cast member.

Mitchell hosted the TV series Tails of Valor, which focused on true stories of service animals whose work has changed people's lives. Also in 2019, Mitchell competed as a celebrity contestant on the 28th season of Dancing with the Stars, with his partner Witney Carson and finished in second place. Starting in December 2020, Mitchell appeared as a panelists for MTV's Ridiculousness spin-off, Deliciousness.

In 2022, Mitchell released a book entitled Blessed Mode: 90 Days to Level Up Your Faith, available physically, digitally, and as an audiobook. A song titled "Blessed Mode" was later released to streaming services like Spotify and iTunes. He and wife Asia also competed in an episode of Guy's Grocery Games against Ross Mathews. Later that year he released the children's book, Prank Day.

The same year, Mitchell would team up with Thompson once more on Saturday Night Live for the "Kenan and Kelly" sketch in the December 3, 2022, episode hosted by Keke Palmer. He also starred in the VH1 television movie All I Didn't Want For Christmas with Gabourey Sidibe, which premiered on December 7.

In April 2025, he starred as Moonface Martin in OFC Creations Theatre Center's production of Anything Goes in Rochester, New York.

In November 2025, Mitchell was a Judge on the Netflix TV show Is It Cake?

== Personal life ==
Mitchell was married to Tyisha Hampton from 1999 until their divorce in 2005. They have two children together, a son and a daughter. Tyisha Mitchell helped create Kel Videos Live (KVL), and Ganked, which she wrote and produced.

Mitchell married rapper Asia Lee on February 25, 2012. They have two children together, a daughter born in July 2017 and a son born in October 2020.

Mitchell and Lee received an award from the Carson Black Chamber in 2016 for their show The Back House Party. He is the spokesperson for Black College Expo.

He is a convert to Christianity. In December 2019, he became a youth pastor at Spirit Food Christian Center in Winnetka, Los Angeles.

== Filmography ==
=== Film ===
Year	Title	Role	Notes
1997	Good Burger	Ed	
1997	Peoria Babylon	Beave	
1999	Mystery Men	Invisible Boy	
2000	The Adventures of Rocky and Bullwinkle	Martin	
2004	Clifford's Really Big Movie	T-Bone (voice)	
2005	Ganked	Ricky Barry	Video
2006	Like Mike 2: Streetball	Ray	Video
2007	Honeydripper	Junebug	
2007	X's & O's	Covonne	
2008	Don't Touch If You Ain't Prayed 2	Curtis	Video
2009	See Dick Run	Rich Jones	
2009	N.C.B.S.	Brannen	Short
2010	Freaknik: The Musical	Fruit Bowl Boys Frontman/Bill Cosby (voice)	TV movie
2011	Battle of Los Angeles	Lt. Tyler Laughlin	Video
2011	B-Rock	B-Rock	Short
2011	Dance Fu	Chicago Pulaski Jones/Pretty Eyed Willy	
2012	She Is Not My Sister	Mr. Right	
2013	Caught on Tape	Marlon	
2014	First Impression	James Mason	
2014	Who Can I Run To	Javon	
2015	Ridin' with Burgess	Lamar	Short
2015	Jingle Hit Factory: Detention	Detention Monitor Mark	Short
2017	Thirst	Grace	Short
2020	Freeze	Chris	Short
2021	Adventures in Christmasing	Darren	
2022	All I Didn't Want for Christmas	Wolf	TV movie
2023	Good Burger 2	Ed	
2024	All I Stole for Christmas	-	Short
2026	Livestream from Hell	Kel Mitchell	

=== Television ===
Year	Title	Role	Notes
1994–99	All That	Himself/Cast Member	Main Cast: Season 1–5
1996–98	The Steve Harvey Show	Vincent	Recurring Cast: Season 1, Guest: Season 2–3
1996–2000	Kenan & Kel	Kel Kimble	Main Cast
1997	Sister, Sister	Todd	Episode: "Inherit the Twin"
1998	Sabrina, the Teenage Witch	Kel Kimble	Episode: "Sabrina's Choice"
1998–99	Figure It Out	Himself/Panelist	Recurring Panelist: Season 2, Guest Panelist: Season 3
1999	WWE Raw	Himself	Episode: "The End of an Era"
1999	The Amanda Show	Himself	Episode: "Episode 1"
1999	Cousin Skeeter	Kel Kimble	Episode: "Hoo, I'm Wild Wild West Part: 1 & 2"
2000	Nash Bridges	Stephen Dick Clark	Episode: "Hit and Run"
2000–01	City Guys	Malcolm	Guest Cast: Season 4–5
2000–03	Clifford the Big Red Dog	T-Bone	Main Cast
2001	The Proud Family	Carlos (voice)	Episode: "Forbidden Date"
2002	The Nick Cannon Show	Himself	Episode: "Nick Takes Over Style"
2003	The Parkers	Freddy Fabulous	Recurring Cast: Season 4, Guest: Season 5
2004	Dance 360	Himself/Co-Host	Main Co-Host
2004	Clifford's Puppy Days	Bill Mazer (voice)	Episode: "Promise Is a Promise, A/Share and Share Alike"
2004	Half & Half	Marlon	Episode: "The Big Not So Loyal Family Episode"
2005	My Coolest Years	Himself	Episode: "The Rich Kids"
2005	The Drop	Himself	Episode: "Episode #2.17"
2005	Complete Savages	Sid	Episode: "The Complete Savages in... 'Hot Water'"
2005–06	One on One	Manny Sellers	Recurring Cast: Season 5
2008	Attack of the Show!	Wayne-Bo	Episode: "Episode #1.767"
2009	Nite Tales: The Series	Marty Mac	Episode: "Ima Star"
2010	Pink Panther and Pals	Ant (voice)	Main cast
2011	Good Luck Charlie	M.C.	Episode: "Battle of the Bands"
2012	The Game	Diesel	Episode: "The Black People Episode"
2012	The First Family	Shady/Swash	Recurring Cast: Season 1
2012	Motorcity	Dutch Gordy (voice)	Main Cast
2012–15	Wild Grinders	Jay Jay (voice)	Main Cast
2013	Sam & Cat	Peezy B	Episode: "#PeezyB"
2014	Love That Girl!	Armondo	Episode: "You Don't Have to Go Home, But..."
2014	The Thundermans	Sensai Kenny	Episode: "Have An Ice Birthday"
2014	Nickelodeon Kids' Choice Awards	Himself	
2014	Liv & Maddie	Q-Pop	Episode: "Howl-A-Rooney"
2014	Friends of the People	Kel	Episode: "Hustle Gods"
2014	Loiter Squad	Himself	Episode: "Razor's Edge"
2015	Laff Mobb's We Got Next	Himself	Episode: "Motivation"
2015	VeggieTales in the House	Various Roles (voice)	Episode: "Cool as a Cucumber/The Rich Young Comic Ruler"
2015	The Tonight Show Starring Jimmy Fallon	Ed	Episode: "James Spader/Andrew Rannells/Brian Regan"
2015–16	Da Jammies	Mike Fresh (voice)	Recurring Cast
2015–19	Game Shakers	Double G	Main Cast
2016	Nickelodeon Kids' Choice Awards	Himself	
2016	Slime Cup	Himself/Presenter	Main Presenter: Season 1
2016	Robot Chicken	Various Roles (voice)	Episode: "Fridge Smell"
2017	WOTN Cleveland	Himself	Episode: "Seventeen The Cincinnati Comic Expo"
2017	90's House	Himself	Episode: "The One With the Sitcom"
2017	Henry Danger	Double G	Episode: "Danger Games"
2018	Wild 'n Out	Himself	Episode: "All That Takeover"
2018	Nickelodeon Kids' Choice Awards	Himself/Live Vote Host	Main Live Vote Host
2018	Double Dare	Himself/Contestant	Episode: "Team Kel vs. Team Kenan"
2018	Laugh at LA	Various Roles	Recurring Cast
2019	Tails of Valor/Best Friends Furever	Himself/Host	Main Host
2019	Camp Nick	Himself	Episode: "Camp Nick Summer Fun"
2019	Dancing with the Stars	Himself/Contestant	Contestant: Season 28
2019	Tails of Valor	Himself	Main Cast
2019	SpongeBob SquarePants	Beans McBeans	Episode: "SpongeBob's Big Birthday Blowout"
2019	South Side	Himself	Episode: "Mild Sauce Meatballs"
2019–20	All That	Various	Recurring Cast: Season 11
2020	The Funny Dance Show	Himself	Episode: "Just Dance, or at Least Try"
2020	The Substitute	Himself	Episode: "Kel Mitchell"
2020	Chasing the Crown: Dreamers to Streamers	Himself	Episode: "201 & 205"
2020	Unfiltered	Himself	Episode: "This Planet is Cuckoo!"
2020–21	Deliciousness	Himself/Panelist	Main Panelist: Season 1–2
2021	PsBattles Live	Himself	Episode: "PsBattles Live: Michael Ian Black and Kel Mitchel"
2022	Black Love	Himself	Episode: "There Isn't One Way: Part 1"
2022	Saturday Night Live	Himself	Episode: "Keke Palmer/SZA"
2022–23	A Black Lady Sketch Show	Mr. Matthews/Gaspar	Guest Cast: Season 3–4
2023	Celebrity Wheel of Fortune	Himself/Celebrity Contestant	Episode: "Kel Mitchell, Kim Fields and Penn Jillette"
2023	Celebrity Squares	Himself	Episode: "Can't Have No Cold Hot Sauce"
2023	Hell's Kitchen	Himself	Episode: "The Pastabilities Are Endless"
2023–24	Pictionary	Himself/Team Captain	Guest: Season 1, Recurring Team Captain: Season 2
2024	After Midnight	Himself	Episode: "Episode #1.11" & "#1.79"
2024	Who Wants to Be a Millionaire	Himself/Contestant	Episode: "Episode #3.1"
2024	Nickelodeon Kids' Choice Awards	Himself	
2025	Nickelodeon Kids' Choice Awards	Himself	

=== Theatre ===
Year	Title	Role	Notes
2025	Anything Goes	Moonface Martin	OFC Creations Theatre Center; Dir. Eric Vaughn Johnson

=== Music videos ===
Year	Title	Artist	Role
1996	"Watch Me Do My Thing"	Immature feat. Smooth	Himself
1997	"All I Want"	702	Ed
1999	"All Star"	Smash Mouth	Invisible Boy
2004	"All Falls Down"	Kanye West feat. Syleena Johnson	Valet
2012	"Living Water"	Travis Greene	Business Man
2017	"Young Dumb & Broke"	Khalid	School Cook
2019	“Hot Shower”	Chance the Rapper feat. MadeinTYO & DaBaby	Line Cook

=== Video games ===
Year	Title	Role
2000	Clifford the Big Red Dog: Learning Activities	T-Bone (voice)
2002	Clifford the Big Red Dog: Musical Memory Games	T-Bone (voice)
2003	Clifford the Big Red Dog: Phonics	T-Bone (voice)
2026	Orange Pop!	Himself (voice)

=== Web ===
Year	Title	Role	Notes
2014	Hotness or Hot Mess	Host; Himself	12 episodes on the MadameNoire website and YouTube
2023	Burger Tales	Host; Himself	on YouTube

== Accolades ==
Year	Awards	Category	Recipient	Outcome
2001	Daytime Emmy Award	Daytime Emmy Award for Outstanding Performer in an Animated Program	Clifford the Big Red Dog	Nominated
2002	Daytime Emmy Award	Daytime Emmy Award for Outstanding Performer in an Animated Program	Clifford the Big Red Dog	Nominated

== Discography ==
=== Singles ===
- 1995: "Chillin" (by Aftermath feat. Kel Mitchell) from All That live performance on April 1, 1995
- 1996: "Watch Me Do My Thing" (by Immature featuring Smooth and Kel Mitchell) from All That: The Album
- 1997: "We're All Dudes" (by Less Than Jake and Kel Mitchell) from the Good Burger soundtrack
- 1999: "Who Are Those Mystery Men" (by Kel Mitchell and the M.A.F.T. Emcees featuring Romaine Jones and Simbi Khali) from the Mystery Men soundtrack
- 1999: "Pedal to the Steel" (by Youngstown featuring Kel Mitchell) from Youngstown's Let's Roll
- 2015: "Kel Mitchell" (by Spec featuring Asia Lee and Kel Mitchell) from Spec Vacancy
- 2022: "Blessed Mode" (by Kel Mitchell featuring nobigdyl and Scootie Wop)
- 2023: "Go Time" (by Kel Mitchell)
- 2023: "All Dudes Remix" from Good Burger 2
- 2024: "Won’t Get Blocked" (collaboration with Rising Lab)
