= Good Burger (soundtrack) =

Good Burger: Music From the Original Paramount Motion Picture

Soundtrack album by Various artists
- Released: July 15, 1997
- Recorded: 1996–1997
- Genre: Pop; rock; hip hop; R&B
- Length: 46:31
- Label: Capitol
- Producer: Karyn Rachtman (exec.); Brian Robbins (exec.); Mike Tollin (exec.); Charles Farrar; Chris Ballew; Chris Park; Dave Dederer; George Clinton; Jason Finn; John Norwood Fisher; Less Than Jake; Louis White; Michael Rosen; Mickey Petralia; Mike Clark; Mint Condition; Nesah-Safu; Rhett Lawrence; The Characters; Troy Taylor; Warren G

Singles from Good Burger: Music From the Original Paramount Motion Picture
- 1. "All I Want" Released: July 29, 1997

Professional ratings
Review scores
| Source | Rating |
|---|---|
| AllMusic | 2.5/5 stars |

Good Burger: Music From the Original Paramount Motion Picture is the soundtrack to Nickelodeon's 1997 comedy film of the same name. It was released on July 15, 1997, through Capitol Records and composes of a blend of hip hop, R&B and rock music. The soundtrack was a minor success, making it to #101 on the Billboard 200 chart and #65 on the Top R&B/Hip-Hop Albums chart.

== Track listing ==
| No. | Title | Length |
|---|---|---|
| 1. | "All I Want" (performed by 702) | 4:00 |
| 2. | "That's the Way (It's Goin' Down)" (performed by Mint Condition) | 4:06 |
| 3. | "I'll Be There for You" (performed by Tracie Spencer) | 5:22 |
| 4. | "Keep On" (performed by The Pharcyde) | 4:12 |
| 5. | "Friends" (performed by Warren G) | 4:04 |
| 6. | "We're All Dudes" (performed by Less Than Jake and Kel Mitchell) | 2:34 |
| 7. | "Man" (performed by The Presidents of the United States of America) | 3:19 |
| 8. | "So-Cal V8" (performed by Redd Kross) | 2:35 |
| 9. | "Do Fries Go with That Shake?" (performed by Trulio Disgracias and De La Soul) | 4:12 |
| 10. | "(Not The) Greatest Rapper" (performed by 1000 Clowns) | 3:53 |
| 11. | "Roxanne" (performed by Spearhead) | 3:51 |
| 12. | "Knee Deep (The Deeper Mix)" (performed by George Clinton and Digital Underground) | 4:24 |
| Total length: | | 46:31 |

== Charts ==
| Chart (1997) | Peak position |
|---|---|
| US Billboard 200 | 101 |
| US Top R&B/Hip-Hop Albums (Billboard) | 65 |
