= No Doubt (song) =

1997 single by 702

Single by 702

from the album No Doubt
- Released: November 17, 1997
- Length: 4:20
- Label: Biv 10; Motown
- Songwriters: Charles Farrar; Troy Taylor
- Producer: The Characters CO/Producer Starrstrukk

702 singles chronology
"All I Want" (1997)	"No Doubt" (1997)	"Beep Me 911" (1998)

"No Doubt" is a song by American girl group 702. It was written and produced by Charles Farrar and Troy Taylor CO/Producer Starrstrukk under their production moniker The Characters. The song was released as the fourth single from the trio's debut studio album No Doubt (1996). It was released in the United Kingdom on November 17, 1997.

== Composition ==
The song runs at 4 minutes and 20 seconds and was described as having a "hip-hop-spiked groove" with a "fun, sing-along" chorus.

== Music video ==
A music video for "No Doubt" was released in spring 1997. The video premiered on BET on the week ending April 13, 1997.

The video starts with the group on a school field trip to a museum, where they sneak away from the class to sing and dance. LeMisha begins the song wearing all blue with backup dancers wearing artifacts from the museum, marching behind her. Irish follows, wearing a green-accented outfit walking down some stairs with the artifact-decorated dancers. Kameelah is seen being carried by the same dancers, wearing a dark purple leather jacket, before being joined by the rest of the group in the middle of the museum, where they all perform choreography.

== Track listing ==
US Promo

1. "No Doubt" (Radio Edit) – 4:10
2. "No Doubt" (LP Version) – 4:21
3. "No Doubt" (Instrumental) – 4:18
4. "No Doubt" (Acappella) – 4:18

UK 12" vinyl

1. "No Doubt" (Radio Edit) – 4:10
2. "No Doubt" (LP Version) – 4:21
3. "Get It Together" (Bass Mix Extended) – 7:01
4. "No Doubt" (Instrumental) – 4:18

UK CD

1. "No Doubt" (Radio Edit) – 4:10
2. "No Doubt" (LP Version) – 4:21
3. "Get It Together" (Bass Mix Extended) – 7:01
4. "No Doubt" (Instrumental) – 4:18

== Charts ==
Weekly chart performance for "No Doubt"
Chart (1997)	Peak position
New Zealand (Recorded Music NZ)	35
UK Singles (Official Charts)	59
UK Hip Hop/R&B (Official Charts)	14
