= Steelo =

Single by 702 featuring Missy Elliott

from the album No Doubt
- Released: August 27, 1996
- Recorded: May 1996
- Studio: The Record Plant (Los Angeles)
- Genre: Pop; soul
- Length: 4:17
- Label: Biv 10
- Songwriters: Melissa Elliott; Chad Elliott; George Pearson; Gordon Sumner
- Producers: Dr. Ceuss; George Pearson

702 singles chronology
"This Lil' Game We Play" (1994)	"Steelo" (1996)	"Get It Together" (1997)

Missy Elliott singles chronology
"The Things That You Do" (1996)	"Steelo" (1996)	"Do Thangz" (1996)

"Steelo" is a song by American group 702 from their first studio album, No Doubt (1996). It was written and produced Chad Elliott, Missy Elliott, and George Pearson, with production overseen by Chad Elliott and Pearson. The song contains a prominent sample from The Police's song "Voices Inside My Head", for which English musician Sting is also given songwriter credits for the use of the sample.

Released as the first single from No Doubt on August 27, 1996, by Biv 10 Records, "Steelo" became a commercial success. It reached number 32 on the US Billboard Hot 100 and peaked within the top 20 on both Billboard's Hot R&B/Hip-Hop Songs chart and Dance Singles Sales chart. A remix of the song was used as the theme song of American children's sitcom Cousin Skeeter.

== Writing and production ==
"Steelo" was written by Chad Elliott, Missy Elliott, and George Pearson, while its procution was overseen by Chad Elliott and Pearson. Recording took place at The Record Plant, in Los Angeles. The song contains a sample from The Police's song "Voices Inside My Head" (1980). English musician Sting, who wrote "Voices Inside My Head", was also credited as a songwriter for "Steelo."

The term "steelo" was defined as "a person's style." Although the term "steelo" had already been used by hip hop duo Mobb Deep in their song "Hit It from the Back" (1993), the popularity of "Steelo" caused the slang word to become widespread, being added to various online dictionaries under the definition "[a person's] unique style". Group member Meelah Williams admitted during 702's Unsung episode that she didn't understand the meaning of the word and that she would often forward people to Missy Elliott for the definition of "steelo".

== Critical reception ==
Larry Flick from Billboard magazine praised the song's production, calling it "infectious." He also felt that lead singer "Kameelah Williams shows signs of becoming a major diva over time." Ultimately, he noted that R&B programmers "are already nibbling on this potential smash" and that it will likely draw the attention of "top 40 tastemakers within moments."

== Commercial performance ==
"Steelo" peaked at thirty-two on the US Billboard Hot 100 and reached the twelfth spot on the Hot R&B/Hip-Hop singles chart. The song sold over 614,000 copies in the United States, earning a Gold certification from the Recording Industry Association of America (RIAA).

== Music video ==
A music video for "Steelo" was directed by Brian Luvar. Set in Boston, MA, it features choreography heavy group dance scenes, interspersed with community basketball games. Missy Elliott is featured on the song as well as in the video. Former 702 member Tiffany Villarreal, who sings background vocals on the song, also made a cameo appearance in video. The visuals were serviced to music television networks BET and MTV on the week ending September 15, 1996.

== Live performances ==
702 performed "Steelo" on American sketch comedy show All That in 1996. In the same year, the group closed out a Showtime at the Apollo show with the song. The group also performed the song on American talk show Teen Summit, which aired on Black Entertainment Television (BET) in October 1996, and again in 1999.

== Track listing ==
CD Single

1. "Steelo" (Remix) – 3:33
2. "Steelo" (LP Version) – 4:17

CD Maxi-Single

1. "Steelo" (Radio Edit) – 3:59
2. "Steelo" (Remix) – 3:33
3. "Steelo" (LP Version) – 4:17
4. "Steelo" (Instrumental) – 4:17
5. "Steelo" (A Cappella) – 3:52

7", 12"

1. "Steelo" (Radio Edit) – 3:49
2. "Steelo" (LP Version) – 4:17

7", 12"

1. "Steelo" (LP Version) – 4:17
2. "Steelo" (Radio Edit) – 3:49
3. "Steelo" (Instrumental) – 4:17
4. "Steelo" (A Cappella) – 3:52

== Credits and personnel ==
Credits lifted from the liner notes of 702.

- Chad "Dr. Ceuss" Elliott – producer, writer
- Missy Elliott – guest vocalist, writer
- George Pearson – producer, writer
- Rashad Smith – producer, remixing
- Gordon "Sting" Sumners – writer

== Charts ==
=== Weekly charts ===
Weekly chart performance for "Steelo"
Chart (1996–1997)	Peak position
New Zealand (Recorded Music NZ)	23
UK Singles (Official Charts)	41
UK Hip Hop/R&B (Official Charts)	9
US Billboard Hot 100 (Billboard)	32
US Dance Singles Sales (Billboard)	16
US Hot R&B/Hip-Hop Songs (Billboard)	12

=== Year-end charts ===
1996 year-end chart performance for "Steelo"
Chart (1996)	Position
US Hot R&B/Hip-Hop Songs (Billboard)	76

1996 year-end chart performance for "Steelo"
Chart (1997)	Position
US Hot R&B/Hip-Hop Songs (Billboard)	67

== Certifications ==
Certifications for "Steelo"
Region	Certification	Certified units/sales
United States (RIAA)	Gold	500,000^{^}
^{^} Shipments figures based on certification alone.

== Release history ==
"Steelo" released history
Region	Date	Format(s)	Label(s)	Ref(s).
United States	August 20, 1996	Rhythmic contemporary radio	Motown	
United States	August 27, 1996	CD	Motown	
United Kingdom	November 25, 1996	12-inch vinyl; CD; cassette	Motown	
