= Doubt (disambiguation) =

Doubt is a mental state.

Doubt may also refer to:

== Music ==
- Doubt (album), released in 1991 by British rock band Jesus Jones
- "Doubt" (Mary J. Blige song), 2014
- "Doubt" (Delphic song), 2010
- "Doubt" (Twenty One Pilots song), 2014
- "Doubt", a song by hide from 50% & 50%

== Film ==
- Doubtful (film), a 2017 Israeli film
- Doubt (2009 film), a 2009 Iranian film
- Doubt (2008 film), a 2008 American film starring Meryl Streep and Philip Seymour Hoffman, adapted from the Shanley play
- Doubt (2003 film) (Duda), a 2003 Philippine film released in the Tagalog language
- Doubt (1951 film), a 1951 Spanish drama film

== Television ==
- Doubt (American TV series), starring Katherine Heigl and Laverne Cox
- Doubt (Arabic TV series), starring Fatima Al-Banawi, Kosai Khauli, Razane Jammal, Nadia Malaika, and Baraa Alem
- Doubt (South Korean TV series), starring Han Suk-kyu, Chae Won-bin, Han Ye-ri, and Oh Yeon-soo

== Other ==
- Doubt (play), by John Patrick Shanley
- Doubt (opera), a 2013 American opera
- Doubt!!, a 2000 manga series published by Kaneyoshi Izumi
- Doubt (manga), published by Yoshiki Tonogai
- Doubt (magazine), published by the Fortean Society

== See also ==
- No Doubt (disambiguation)
- Question mark
