= No Doubt (disambiguation) =

No Doubt is an American rock band.

No Doubt may also refer to:

- No Doubt (702 album), 1996
  - No Doubt (song)
- No Doubt (No Doubt album), 1992
- No Doubt (Petra album), 1995, or the title song
- "No Doubt", a song by Camila Cabello from Familia, 2022
