= The Rain (Supa Dupa Fly) =

1997 single by Missy Elliott

Single by Missy Elliott

from the album Supa Dupa Fly
- Released: May 20, 1997
- Recorded: 1996–1997
- Studio: Master Sound (Virginia Beach, Virginia)
- Length: 4:10 (album version); 3:59 (radio edit)
- Label: Goldmind; Elektra
- Songwriters: Melissa Elliott; Timothy Mosley; Ann Peebles; Don Bryant; Bernard Miller
- Producer: Timbaland

Missy Elliott singles chronology
"Can We" (1997)	"The Rain (Supa Dupa Fly)" (1997)	"Not Tonight" (Ladies Night remix) (1997)

Music video
- "The Rain (Supa Dupa Fly)" on YouTube

"The Rain (Supa Dupa Fly)" is the debut solo single by American rapper Missy "Misdemeanor" Elliott. It was written and composed by Don Bryant, Bernard "Bernie" Miller, Elliott, and producer Timbaland for her debut album, Supa Dupa Fly (1997), and contains a sample of Ann Peebles' 1973 single "I Can't Stand the Rain", whose lyrics serve as the chorus.

The song was released to US radio stations on May 20, 1997, and the Hype Williams-directed video was released to video shows starting June 3, 1997. The song entered the US Billboard Hot R&B Airplay chart in mid-June, and peaked at number six the week of August 9, 1997. It also peaked at number 51 on the Billboard Hot 100 Airplay chart the following week. Internationally, it reached the top 20 in the United Kingdom and New Zealand. The song's moans are used as a sample in Method Man & Redman's "The ?"

== Background ==
"The Rain" was written and produced by Elliott and longtime collaborator Timbaland for Elliott's debut album Supa Dupa Fly (1997). Elliott later commented on the song: "Of course, those were my smoke days, you can tell by the first line. I just went in and I just said whatever I felt. Back then, there was no expectation, so it wasn't like I had to really think and say, ’OK, I have to make something better than what I did the last time. This was my first time going in, so it was like, whatever the music made me feel, I said it."

== Critical reception ==
Larry Flick from Billboard magazine wrote, "Elliott commits more than a misdemeanor with her first solo single, 'The Rain'. Having scored a handful of hits writing and producing for such acts as Aaliyah, 702, SWV and Ginuwine, Elliott attempts to hide the fact that she was lazy with her own lyrics and depended on a Timbaland beat to save her. The result is a little of her infamous wordplay atop an ineffectual bass, snare, and drum beat. One can only hope that she puts more time and effort into her upcoming album, Hit 'Em with the Heat, as we don't want to see such a rising star burn out so fast." VH1 ranked the song 99th on VH1's 100 Greatest Songs of the '90s. In 2010 Pitchfork Media included the song at number 33 on their Top 200 Tracks of the 90s. In 2000, "The Rain (Supa Dupa Fly)" was named the fourth-best single of 1997 by The Village Voice's annual-year end Pazz & Jop critics' poll. Stereogum and Paste ranked the song number three and number four, respectively, on their lists of the 10 greatest Missy Elliott Songs. In 2021, it was listed at No. 453 on Rolling Stone's 500 Greatest Songs of All Time.

== Music video ==
The breakout music video for the song was the first of Missy's career directed by American director Hype Williams. The video was designed by Ron Norsworthy. The most notable aspect of the video is the patent leather blow up suit, which resembles an inflated trash bag that Missy wears during a fisheye lens shot. Timbaland, Tamara Johnson-George of SWV, Yo-Yo, Lil' Kim, Total, 702, Da Brat, Lil' Cease, and Sean Combs all make cameos. The video was nominated for Best Rap Video at the 1997 MTV Video Music Awards but lost to The Notorious B.I.G.'s "Hypnotize". In 2023, Rolling Stone placed the video at number one on their list of 150 Best Rap Music Videos of All Time.

== Legacy ==
The song was used in a 2016 Coca-Cola commercial featuring professional golfer Jordan Spieth. At the 2019 MTV Video Music Awards, Elliot performed a medley of her songs, including "The Rain (Supa Dupa Fly)".

In 2024, the song was beamed to the planet Venus by NASA's Deep Space Network, making it the first hip-hop song to ever be transmitted into space. Elliot chose Venus specifically because “it symbolizes strength, beauty, and empowerment.”

== Formats and track listings ==
1. "The Rain (Supa Dupa Fly)" (Radio Edit) - 4:05
2. "The Rain (Supa Dupa Fly)" (Desert Eagles Discs Remix - Radio Edit Master) - 3:57
3. "The Rain (Supa Dupa Fly)" (Instrumental) - 4:09

German 12" Remixes

Side A

1. "The Rain (Supa Dupa Fly)" (Club 100 Version) - 5:10
2. "The Rain (Supa Dupa Fly)" (Radio Edit) - 3:46

Side B

1. "The Rain (Supa Dupa Fly)" (House Version) - 7:25

German CD Maxi-Single

1. "The Rain (Supa Dupa Fly)" (Radio Edit) - 3:59
2. "The Rain (Supa Dupa Fly)" (Desert Eagle Discs Remix - Radio Edit Master) - 3:53
3. "The Rain (Supa Dupa Fly)" (Desert Eagle Discs Remix - Master) - 4:32
4. "The Rain (Supa Dupa Fly)" (Desert Eagle Discs Remix - Beat & All Vocals) - 4:20
5. "The Rain (Supa Dupa Fly)" (Desert Eagle Discs Remix - A cappella) - 4:04
6. "The Rain (Supa Dupa Fly)" (Instrumental Version) - 4:11
7. "The Rain (Supa Dupa Fly)" (A cappella version) - 4:08

U.S. 12-inch Promo

Side A

1. "Supa Dupa Fly (The Rain)" (Album Version) - 4:11
2. "Supa Dupa Fly (The Rain)" (Instrumental) - 4:11

Side B

1. "Supa Dupa Fly (The Rain)" (Radio Edit) - 3:59
2. "Supa Dupa Fly (The Rain)" (A cappella) - 4:11

U.S. 12-inch Single

Side A

1. "The Rain (Supa Dupa Fly)" (Radio Edit) - 3:59
2. "The Rain (Supa Dupa Fly)" (Instrumental Version) - 4:11
3. "The Rain (Supa Dupa Fly)" (A cappella version) - 4:08

Side B

1. "The Rain (Supa Dupa Fly)" (Desert Eagles Discs Remix - Master) - 4:32
2. "The Rain (Supa Dupa Fly)" (Desert Eagles Discs Remix - A cappella) - 4:04
3. "The Rain (Supa Dupa Fly)" (Desert Eagles Discs Remix - Beat & All Vocals) - 4:20

U.S. CD Maxi-Single

1. "The Rain (Supa Dupa Fly)" (Radio Edit) - 4:05
2. "The Rain (Supa Dupa Fly)" (Desert Eagles Discs Remix - Radio Edit Master) - 3:57
3. "The Rain (Supa Dupa Fly)" (Instrumental) - 4:09

== Charts ==
Chart performance for "The Rain (Supa Dupa Fly)"
Chart (1997)	Peak position
Netherlands (Dutch Top 40)	27
Netherlands (Single Top 100)	44
New Zealand (Recorded Music NZ)	10
Scottish Singles Sales (Official Charts)	64
UK Singles (Official Charts)	16
UK Dance (Official Charts)	8
UK Hip Hop/R&B (Official Charts)	8
US Dance Singles Sales (Billboard) with "Sock It 2 Me"	3
US Hot R&B/Hip-Hop Songs (Billboard) with "Sock It 2 Me"	4
US Radio Songs (Billboard)	51
US Rhythmic Airplay (Billboard)	18
