= Hit Em wit da Hee =

Single by Missy Elliott featuring Lil' Kim and Mocha

from the album Supa Dupa Fly and Can't Hardly Wait: Music From The Motion Picture
- Released: April 3, 1998
- Recorded: 1997
- Studio: Master Sound Studios (Virginia Beach, Virginia)
- Genre: Hip-hop; R&B
- Length: 4:20 (album version); 4:49 (remix)
- Label: Goldmind; Elektra
- Songwriters: Melissa Elliott; Kimberly Jones; Aleesha Richards; Timothy Mosley
- Producer: Timbaland

Missy Elliott singles chronology
"Beep Me 911" (1998)	"Hit Em wit da Hee" (1998)	"Make It Hot" (1998)

Lil' Kim singles chronology
"Not Tonight" (1997)	"Hit Em wit da Hee" (1998)	"No Matter What They Say" (2000)

Mocha singles chronology
"Hit Em wit da Hee" (1998)	"Make It Hot" (1998)

Music video
- "Hit Em wit da Hee" on YouTube

"Hit Em wit da Hee" is a song by American rapper Missy "Misdemeanor" Elliott. The track is found on her 1997 debut album, Supa Dupa Fly. The single was not eligible to chart in the US (because it was not commercially released there), and it was a success overseas, reaching No. 25 in the UK, her fourth consecutive top 40 hit. The music video edit of the song contains sampled strings from the Björk song "Jóga". In the US the album version was released to radio and it received minor mainstream urban radio airplay and peaked at No. 61 on the US Billboard Hot R&B/Hip-Hop Airplay chart. Released from Supa Dupa Fly, it was the final single from the album during summer 1998.

== Music video ==
The music video for this song takes place in a dark castle on a hill and it was shot on March 31, 1998. Elliott is seen in a suit dancing with other dancers. When the song changes to the "Jóga" instrumental, she is seen walking with a magic chalice and three objects floating beside her; specifically a teapot, a metal egg holder and a metal gauntlet. Cameo appearances are made by Magoo, Keli Nicole Price, Nicole Wray, Ginuwine, Playa, Mocha, and Timbaland. The song ends with the metal horse moving rapidly almost as if Elliott had something to do with it. The remix of the song was used for the video. Instead of featuring Lil' Kim, the remix features Keli Nicole Price, Mocha and Timbaland.

== Track listings ==
=== US Single ===
12" Promo

Side A

1. "Hit 'Em Wit Da Hee" (Remix Extended Version) (featuring Lil' Kim & Mocha)
2. "Hit 'Em Wit Da Hee" (LP Version Clean) (featuring Lil' Kim & Mocha)

Side B

1. "Hit 'Em Wit Da Hee" (Remix Instrumental)
2. "Hit 'Em Wit Da Hee" (Remix Acapella) (featuring Lil' Kim & Mocha)

12" Single

Side A

1. "Hit 'Em Wit Da Hee" (Remix Extended Version) (featuring Lil' Kim & Mocha) - 4:57

Side B

1. "Beep Me 911" (Remix) (featuring 702 & Magoo) - 4:20
2. "Sock It 2 Me" (Funky DL Remix) (featuring Da Brat) - 4:30

=== UK Single ===
CD Maxi-Single

1. "Hit 'Em Wit Da Hee" (LP Version) (featuring Lil' Kim & Mocha) - 4:53
2. "Hit 'Em Wit Da Hee" (Ganja Kru Remix) (featuring Lil' Kim & Mocha) - 6:42
3. "Sock It 2 Me" (Funky DL Remix) (featuring Da Brat) - 4:30

=== Europe Single ===
12" Single

Side A

1. "Hit 'Em Wit Da Hee" (LP Version Dirty) (featuring Lil' Kim & Mocha) - 4:20

Side B

1. "Hit 'Em Wit Da Hee" (Remix Instrumental) - 4:53
2. "Hit 'Em Wit Da Hee" (Ganja Kru Remix) (featuring Lil' Kim & Mocha) - 6:42

== Charts ==
Chart (1998)	Peak position
Germany (GfK)	63
New Zealand (Recorded Music NZ)	27
Scottish Singles Sales (Official Charts)	72
UK Singles (Official Charts)	25
UK Dance (Official Charts)	7
UK Hip Hop/R&B (Official Charts)	9
US R&B/Hip-Hop Airplay (Billboard)	61
