= Get It Together (702 song) =

Single by 702

from the album No Doubt
- Released: January 28, 1997
- Recorded: 1996
- Studio: Axis Studios (New York City)
- Genre: R&B
- Length: 4:51
- Label: Motown
- Songwriter(s): Donell Jones
- Producer(s): Donell Jones

702 singles chronology
"Steelo" (1996)	"Get It Together" (1997)	"All I Want" (1997)

"Get It Together" is a song recorded by American girl group 702 for their first studio album No Doubt (1996). It was written and produced by American singer Donell Jones. It was released as the second single from No Doubt on January 28, 1997, by Biv 10 Records.

"Get It Together" was a commercial success, becoming the group's first single to reach the US Billboard Hot 100 chart. It was eventually certified gold by the Recording Industry Association of America (RIAA). The single sold over 814,000 copies, becoming one of the highest-selling singles of 1997. An accompanying music video for the song was directed by DK Puriefoy.

== Background and composition ==
"Get It Together" is a contemporary R&B ballad, written by American singer Donell Jones. The song was recorded at Axis Studios in New York City in 1996. During the recording of the song, Jones made 702 record the song several times, insisting on perfection.

== Commercial performance ==
In the United States, "Get It Together" debuted at number thirty-seven Billboard Hot 100 chart and climbed to number ten after six weeks. The song fell to number eleven on the next week. The song fell to number fifty-seven in its final week before falling off the charts after a total of twenty weeks on the chart. On the Hot R&B/Hip-Hop Songs chart, the song peaked at number three. The song became one of the highest-selling singles of 1997.

== Music video ==
An accompanying music video was directed by DK Puriefoy, and produced by Rae Permann. The video features 702 performing the song while standing near a window pane on a stormy night. Other scenes include the members sitting in individual chairs or a bathtub while contemplating where their boyfriend is.

The music video debuted on music video stations for BET. The music video became one of the most played music videos on the network in early 1997.

== Impact and legacy ==
The song experienced renewed popularity in 2019 and 2020 when it was sampled by several prominent artists. In 2019, the song's chorus was sampled for the intro of Mustard's song, "Ballin'". Also in 2019, the song was sampled throughout Summer Walker's song "Body".

Walker was later featured on dvsn’s 2020 song "'Flawless' Do It Well Pt. 3" which also heavily samples "Get It Together."

== Track listing ==
7", 12", 33 1/3 RPM, Vinyl

1. "Get It Together" (LP Version) - 4:50
2. "Get It Together" (Radio Edit) - 4:01
3. "Get It Together" (Instrumental) - 4:56
4. "Get It Together" (A Capella) - 4:21

== Credits and personnel ==
Credits adapted from album booklet liner notes.

Studios

- Recorded at Axis Studios (New York City)

Personnel

- Meelah Williams - vocals
- LeMisha Grinstead - background vocals
- Irish Grinstead - background vocals
- Mary Brown - background vocals
- Donell Jones - writing, production

== Charts ==
=== Weekly charts ===
Chart (1997)	Peak position
New Zealand (Recorded Music NZ)	8
US Billboard Hot 100 (Billboard)	10
US Hot R&B/Hip-Hop Songs (Billboard)	3
US Rhythmic (Billboard)	7

=== Year-end charts ===
Chart (1997)	Position
US Billboard Hot 100	48
US Hot R&B/Hip-Hop Songs (Billboard)	10
