= The Other Woman (Miss Jones album) =

Studio album by Miss Jones
- Released: June 16, 1998
- Length: 61:11
- Label: Motown
- Producers: Big Mike; The Characters; Ray Chew; Chad "Dr. Ceuss" Elliott; Bernard Grobman; Robert Jerald; Ricky Jones; Chris "C.L." Liggio; Nate Love; Rashad "Ringo" Smith; Al West; Chill Will; Lesette Wilson; Mario Winans

The Other Woman is the first and only album released by American singer Miss Jones. It was released on June 16, 1998 through Motown Records.

== Background ==
Jones had previously signed a deal with Tommy Boy Records and released the minor hits "Where I Wanna Be Boy" and "Don't Front", but left the label to take a job as a radio DJ for Hot 97. Eventually she returned to performing and signed with Motown and began to record her debut album. The project featured production from the likes of Mario Winans and Rashad Smith and guest appearances from Doug E. Fresh, Mobb Deep and Craig Mack.

== Promotion ==
The album's lead single was "2 Way Street", which managed to make it to the Billboard Hot 100, peaking at 62. The Other Woman, however, did not perform well and only made it to 51 on the Top R&B/Hip-Hop Albums. Jones was soon released from Motown and eventually left her music career behind in 2001.

== Critical reception ==
Professional ratings
Review scores
Source	Rating
AllMusic	3/5 stars

AllMusic editor Stephen Thomas Erlewine found that The Other Woman "may run a little too long, but it demonstrates that Miss Jones is an ambitious performer, blending hip-hop and urban R&B in intriguing ways. She doesn't quite break from formula, choosing to build on Mary J. Blige's groundbreaking sound instead of creating her own, but the end results are often sexy, melodic and danceable – which is enough to make it a fine debut."

== Track listing ==
The Other Woman track listing
No.	Title	Writer(s)	Length
1.	"The Other Woman"	Avon Marshall; Tarsha Jones	0:40
2.	"Dance Wit Me" (featuring Doug E. Fresh)	Charles Farrar; Herman Kelly; Mary Brown; Troy Taylor	4:00
3.	"You and Me" (Intro)	Chad Elliott; Jones	1:03
4.	"You and Me"	Al West; Elliott; Charmelle Cofield; Jones	3:29
5.	"Baby Maybe" (featuring Mobb Deep)	Albert Johnson; Hal David; Burt Bacharach; Chris Liggio; Felicia Adams; Kejuan Muchita	4:00
6.	"Need Somebody"	West; Carlos Wilson; Elliott; Cofield; Louis Wilson; Ric Wilson; Rufus Blaq	3:17
7.	"Won't Stop" (featuring Craig Mack)	Armando Colon; Edward Moore; Howard King; Rashad Smith; Renée Neufville	3:29
8.	"I Care" (Interlude)	Elliott; Jones	1:31
9.	"So Amazing"	Kenny Hickson; Mario Winans; Jones	3:59
10.	"Me and Miss Jones" (featuring Jazz)	Carey Gilbert; Kenny Gamble; Leon Huff	2:43
11.	"Love Under New Management"	Annette Hardeman; Gabriel Hardeman	5:51
12.	"Smooth"	Farrar; Taral Hicks; Taylor	4:44
13.	"2 Way Street"	Hickson; Mario Winans; Jones	3:55
14.	"My First Love"	Melissa Ritter; Ricky Jones; Robert Jerald	4:45
15.	"Raindown"	West; Elliott; Cofield; Doug Watts	4:13
16.	"Pushing Me Away"	Janice Dempsey; Mike Clemons; Nate Clemons; Phil Weatherspoon; Jones	4:47
17.	"Lies"	Bernard Grobman; Neufville; Jones	4:45
Total length:			61:11

== Charts ==
Weekly chart performance for The Other Woman
Chart (1998)	Peak position
US Heatseekers Albums (Billboard)	40
US Top R&B/Hip-Hop Albums (Billboard)	51
