= Good Times (Subway album) =

Studio album by Subway
- Released: January 24, 1995
- Recorded: 1994
- Genres: R&B, hip hop
- Length: 36:54
- Labels: Biv 10, Motown
- Producers: Dinky Bingham, Gerald Levert, Edwin "Tony" Nicholas, Chad "Dr. Ceuss" Elliott

Good Times is the only studio album by Subway, released on January 24, 1995 through a joint venture of Motown and Michael Bivins' Biv 10 Records.

The album is best known for its lead single "This Lil' Game We Play", a duet with labelmates, 702. The song became a top 20 hit for the group and was certified gold during the summer of 1995. Despite the success of the single, however, the album was unable to achieve the same amount of success, only reaching number 101 on the Billboard 200.

== Track listing ==
1. "Chi-Town Ride" – 4:01 (featuring Easy and Tung Twista)
2. "The Better the Love" – 3:42
3. "Fire" – 4:01
4. "This Lil' Game We Play" – 4:52 (featuring 702)
5. "Get da Money" – 3:10
6. "This Is Not a Goodbye" – 4:27
7. "Sticky Situation" – 4:56
8. "Get da Money" (Remix) – 3:04
9. "Goodtimes" – 4:41

== Chart history ==
Chart (1995)	Peak position
Billboard 200	101
Billboard Top R&B/Hip-Hop Albums	23
Billboard Top Heatseekers	1
