= All I Want (702 song) =

Single by 702

from the album No Doubt and Good Burger: Music From the Original Motion Picture
- B-side: "Get It Together"
- Released: July 8, 1997
- Recorded: 1996
- Genre: R&B; bubblegum
- Length: 3:59
- Label: Biv 10; Motown; Capitol
- Songwriter(s): Charles Farrar; Berry Gordy; Alphonso Mizell; Freddie Perren; Deke Richards; Troy Taylor
- Producer(s): The Characters

702 singles chronology
"Get It Together" (1997)	"All I Want" (1997)	"Beep Me 911" (1998)

"All I Want" is a song by American R&B group 702 recorded for the group's debut album No Doubt (1996). The song was released as the third single for the album and as a promotional single for the soundtrack to the 1997 film Good Burger on July 8, 1997.

The song peaked at number thirty-five on the Billboard Hot 100 chart.

== Background ==
The song contains a sample of The Jackson 5's "It's Great to Be Here", from their 1971 album Maybe Tomorrow.

== Release and reception ==
The song peaked at thirty-five on the U.S. Billboard Hot 100 and reached the thirty-third spot on the Hot R&B/Hip-Hop singles chart.

== Music video ==
An accompanying music video was released featuring Kenan Thompson and Kel Mitchell as Ed and Dexter Reed from the Good Burger movie as well as clips from the movie being shown. The video starts with the members of 702 pulling up to the Good Burger restaurant where they see a "Help Wanted" sign, and applying for a job by saying the restaurant's slogan. The group is seen sitting in a diner booth, dancing alongside Ed and Dexter, posing inside telephone booths, and later singing in the kitchen with vintage microphones.

The music video was serviced to BET and The Box on the week ending July 13, 1997.

== Track listing ==
CD

1. "All I Want" (LP Version) - 3:59
2. "Get It Together" (Bass Mix Extended) - 7:01
  (feat. Doug Lazy)
3. "All I Want" (Bink)

== Chart performance ==
Chart (1997)	Peak position
US Billboard Hot 100 (Billboard)	35
US Dance Singles Sales (Billboard)	22
US Hot R&B/Hip-Hop Songs (Billboard)	33
US Rhythmic (Billboard)	31

== Personnel ==
Credits adapted from album booklet liner notes.

- Instruments (background) – Charles Farrar, Troy Taylor
- Production – Charles Farrar, Troy Taylor
- Writing – Charles Farrar, Berry Gordy, Alphonso Mizell, Freddie Perren, Deke Richards, Troy Taylor

== Release history ==
Region	Date	Format(s)	Label(s)	Ref(s).
United States	July 8, 1997	Rhythmic contemporary radio	Motown	
United States	July 29, 1997	CD	Motown	
United States	August 19, 1997	12-inch vinyl	Motown	
