= Supa Dupa Fly =

Studio album by Missy "Misdemeanor" Elliott
- Released: July 15, 1997
- Recorded: 1996–1997
- Studio: Master Sound Studios (Virginia)
- Genres: Hip hop; avant-funk; R&B
- Length: 60:06
- Labels: Goldmind; East West; Elektra
- Producers: Missy "Misdemeanor" Elliott; Timbaland

Missy "Misdemeanor" Elliott chronology
Supa Dupa Fly (1997)	Da Real World (1999)

Singles from Supa Dupa Fly
- 1. "The Rain (Supa Dupa Fly)" Released: July 2, 1997; 2. "Sock It 2 Me" Released: September 21, 1997; 3. "Beep Me 911" Released: March 23, 1998; 4. "Hit Em wit da Hee" Released: April 3, 1998

Supa Dupa Fly is the debut studio album by American rapper Missy "Misdemeanor" Elliott, released on July 15, 1997, by The Goldmind, East West, and Elektra Entertainment Group. The album was recorded and produced solely by Timbaland in October 1996, and features the singles "The Rain (Supa Dupa Fly)", "Sock It 2 Me", "Hit Em wit da Hee" and "Beep Me 911". Guest appearances on the album include Busta Rhymes, Ginuwine, 702, Magoo, Da Brat, Lil' Kim, and Aaliyah. The album was recorded in just two weeks.

The album received acclaim from critics, who praised Timbaland's futuristic production style and Elliott's performances and persona. It debuted at number three on the US Billboard 200 and topped the US Top R&B/Hip-Hop Albums chart. The album was certified platinum by the Recording Industry Association of America (RIAA) and has sold 1.2 million copies in the United States.

In 2020, the album was ranked 93 on Rolling Stone's "500 Greatest Albums of All Time" and, in 2022, 53 on their "100 Best Debut Albums of All Time". In 2024, Apple Music placed the album at number 75 on their 100 Best Albums list.

== Background and recording ==
While in high school, Elliott formed a group called Fayze—later to be renamed Sista—with three of her friends. The group attracted the attention of record producer DeVante Swing, who was part of the R&B group Jodeci. After being signed to the Swing Mob record label, Sista recorded an album in New York, but the album was never released. This led to subsequent termination of Sista's recording contract. Elliott returned to Portsmouth, Virginia, where she and record producer Timbaland began writing songs and contributed to singer Aaliyah's album One in a Million.

In 1996, Elliott was signed to East West Records, which at that time was a division of Elektra Entertainment Group, and was given her own record label, The Goldmind Inc. Sylvia Rhone, then the chairman and chief executive officer (CEO) of Elektra, encouraged Elliott to embark upon a solo career. Recording sessions of Supa Dupa Fly took place at the Master Sound Studios in Virginia Beach, Virginia; the recording process took place over slightly more than a week. The album was produced solely by Timbaland.

The first single released from the album was "The Rain (Supa Dupa Fly)". As part of the promotional drive for her album, Elliott took part in the 1998 Lilith Fair tour; she became the first female rapper to perform at the event. She also joined rapper Jay-Z's Rock the Mic tour.

== Music and lyrics ==
Supa Dupa Fly brings together elements of hip hop, dance, R&B, electronic music, and soul. Music critic Garry Mulholland described Timbaland's production as "eschewing samples for a bump 'n' grind electronica, strongly influenced by the digital rhythms of dancehall reggae, but rounder, fuller, fatter". AllMusic described it as consisting of "lean, digital grooves [...] packed with unpredictable arrangements and stuttering rhythms that often resemble slowed-down drum'n'bass breakbeats." A retrospective review from The New Yorker emphasizes the usage of "extra-musical noises" as "instruments in and of themselves" on the album, and describes the result as "a futuristic sound in which the organic and the synthetic were complementary".

Elliott's raps were described as "full of hilariously surreal free associations that fit the off-kilter sensibility of the music to a tee". According to author Mickey Hess, the album's lyrical content "reveals Elliott's complex, creative, and challenging discussion about womanhood; her demand for respect, respect for her personal voice and her desire for fulfilling intimacy with lovers and friends". Elliott has also been recognized for her diverse cadences and deliveries on the album, a versatility that has been described as her "oily ability to slip from singing to rapping to elliptical riffing".

The album's opening track, "Busta's Intro", features rapper Busta Rhymes as a town crier warning of a "historical event about to unfold". "The Rain (Supa Dupa Fly)" contains a sample of Ann Peebles' 1973 song "I Can't Stand the Rain". "Pass da Blunt" is partly based on the song "Pass the Dutchie" by Musical Youth. The track "Bite Our Style (Interlude)" samples the song "Morning Glory" by Jamiroquai.

== Reception ==
Professional ratings
Review scores
Source	Rating
AllMusic	5/5 stars
Chicago Tribune	3/4 stars
Entertainment Weekly	A−
The Guardian	4/5 stars
Los Angeles Times	3.5/4 stars
Pitchfork	9.0/10
Rolling Stone	3.5/5 stars
The Rolling Stone Album Guide	5/5 stars
The Village Voice	A−

Upon its release, Supa Dupa Fly received acclaim among music critics. Elliott's rapping, singing and songwriting received much acclaim, while Timbaland's production was hailed as unique and revolutionary. AllMusic called the album a "boundary-shattering postmodern masterpiece" whose "futuristic, nearly experimental style became the de facto sound of urban radio at the close of the millennium".

Spin magazine ranked the album at number nine on its Top 20 Albums of the Year. In 1998, four out of five music critics from The New York Times ranked the album as one of their top ten favorite albums of 1997. The album earned Elliott two Grammy Award nominations: Best Rap Album and Best Rap Solo Performance for "The Rain (Supa Dupa Fly)".

Supa Dupa Fly debuted at number three on the US Billboard 200 with 129,000 copies sold in the first week released, becoming the highest debut for a female rapper at the time. The album remained on the chart for 37 weeks. On September 19, 1997, the album was certified platinum by the Recording Industry Association of America (RIAA) for sales of over a million copies. As of June 2008, it has sold 1.2 million copies in the United States.

== Legacy ==
Retrospective ratings
Review scores
Source	Rating
The Rolling Stone Album Guide	5/5 stars

With the release of Supa Dupa Fly, Elliott became one of the most prominent female rappers. Her persona on the album established a niche separate from the archetypes of "hypersexualized vixens or rugged hip hop purists", leading it to be argued that Supa Dupa Fly "caused a shift in how women in rap were perceived". The album is credited for redefining hip hop and R&B; in particular, Elliott's combination of rapped and sung vocals has been described as "pioneering". Its production has been described as "visionary" for its usage of sampling, in which samples are not used straightforwardly and instead undergo "bending... to fit the album's unconventional tempos". Its sound is frequently described as "futuristic" and "ahead of its time", with retrospective reviews often stating that the album retains that feel even decades after its release. Steve Huey of AllMusic felt that the album was "arguably the most influential album ever released by a female hip-hop artist".

The 2004 edition of The Rolling Stone Album Guide rated the album five out of five stars, noting that the avant-garde sound of the album "made Elliott and Timbaland the hottest writer/producer team around". Mulholland called the album a "key prophecy of the dominant 21st century black pop", noting Elliott's ability to "avoid the whole east vs. west, playas vs. gangstas mess." He described Elliott's style as "everything the hip hop doctor ordered; a woman who could flip between aggression and romance, sex and nonsense, materialism and imagination, without batting one outrageously spidery eyelash".

The music videos from Supa Dupa Fly have been recognized as influential for their Afrofuturist style, with Elliott's leather "trash bag suit" in the "I Can't Stand the Rain (Supa Dupa Fly)" video being hailed as especially iconic.

== Track listing ==
All tracks produced by Timbaland.

No.	Title	Writer(s)	Length
1.	"Busta's Intro" (performed by Busta Rhymes)	Trevor Smith	1:53
2.	"Hit Em wit da Hee" (featuring Lil' Kim)	Elliott; Timothy Mosley; Kimberly Jones; Alicia Richards	4:19
3.	"Sock It 2 Me" (featuring Da Brat)	Elliott; Mosley; William Hart; Thom Bell; Shawntae Harris	4:17
4.	"The Rain (Supa Dupa Fly)"	Elliott; Mosley; Ann Peebles; Bernard Miller; Don Bryant	4:11
5.	"Beep Me 911" (featuring 702 & Magoo)	Elliott; Mosley; Melvin Barcliff	4:57
6.	"They Don't Wanna Fuck wit Me" (featuring Timbaland)	Elliott; Mosley	3:18
7.	"Pass da Blunt" (featuring Timbaland)	Elliott; Mosley; Jackie Mittoo; Lloyd Ferguson; Felix Headley Bennett; Huford Brown; Robbie Lyn; Leroy Sibbles; Fitzroy Simpson	3:17
8.	"Bite Our Style (Interlude)"	Elliott; Mosley	0:43
9.	"Friendly Skies" (featuring Ginuwine)	Elliott; Mosley	4:59
10.	"Best Friends" (featuring Aaliyah)	Elliott; Mosley	4:07
11.	"Don't Be Commin' (In My Face)"	Elliott; Mosley	4:11
12.	"Izzy Izzy Ahh"	Elliott; Mosley	3:54
13.	"Why You Hurt Me"	Elliott; Mosley; Eddie Floyd	4:31
14.	"I'm Talkin'"	Elliott; Mosley	5:02
15.	"Gettaway" (featuring Space and Nicole^{[a]})	Elliott; Mosley; Tracey Selden; Lashone Siplin	4:25
16.	"Busta's Outro" (performed by Busta Rhymes)	Smith; Mosley	1:38
17.	"Missy's Finale"	Elliott	0:24

=== Notes ===
- ^{^[a]} Credited as Nicole, the featured artist often gets mistaken to be Nicole Wray, even though the featured artist is Virginia "Nikki" Slim. Missy reportedly talked about the falsely given credit in an interview.

== Personnel ==
Credits for Supa Dupa Fly adapted from AllMusic.

- 702 – vocals, performer
- Aaliyah – vocals, performer
- Kwaku Alston – photography
- Starr Foundation/Romon Yang – Art Direction
- Gregory Burke – design
- Busta Rhymes – vocals, rap, performer
- Richard Clark – assistant engineer
- Nicole – vocals, performer
- Drew Coleman – assistant engineer
- Da Brat – vocals, performer
- Jimmy Douglas – engineer, audio mixing
- Missy "Misdemeanor" Elliott – vocals, rap, executive producer
- Ginuwine – vocals, performer
- Lil' Kim – performer
- Magoo – rap
- Bill Pettaway – bass, guitar
- Herb Powers – mastering
- Timbaland – vocals, producer, performer, executive producer, mixing

== Charts ==
Chart (1997)	Peak position
Canada Top Albums/CDs (RPM)	43
Dutch Albums (Album Top 100)	69
New Zealand Albums (RMNZ)	49
UK Albums (Official Charts)	124
UK R&B Albums (Official Charts)	16
US Billboard 200	3
US Top R&B/Hip-Hop Albums (Billboard)	1

== Certifications ==
Region	Certification	Certified units/sales
United Kingdom (BPI)	Silver	60,000^{^}
United States (RIAA)	Platinum	1,200,000
^{^} Shipments figures based on certification alone.

== See also ==
- List of number-one R&B albums of 1997 (U.S.)
