= This Lil' Game We Play =

Single by Subway featuring 702

from the album Good Times
- Released: November 1, 1994
- Recorded: 1994
- Genre: R&B
- Length: 4:52
- Label: Motown
- Songwriter(s): Edwin "Tony" Nicholas, Gerald Levert
- Producer(s): Edwin "Tony" Nicholas, Gerald Levert

Subway singles chronology
"This Lil' Game We Play" (1994)	"Fire" (1995)

702 singles chronology
"This Lil' Game We Play" (1994)	"Steelo" (1996)

"This Lil' Game We Play" is the lead single released from Subway's only album, Good Times. The song featured the female R&B group 702 and was produced and written by Gerald Levert and Edwin "Tony" Nicholas.

Released late in 1994, by early 1995 "This Lil' Game We Play" became a major hit for the groups, spending 20 weeks on the Billboard Hot 100, reaching a peak of 15 during the week of April 15, 1995. By June 15, 1995, the single achieved a gold certification from the RIAA for sales of 500,000 copies. Despite the single's success, neither Subway's album Good Times nor any of their follow-up singles were able to achieve much success. The group disbanded in 1996 without releasing another top-40 hit. 702 had a successful career in music, releasing three albums and obtaining several top-40 hits from 1996 to 2003.

== Single track listing ==
1. "This Lil' Game We Play" (Pop Edit) - 4:00
2. "This Lil' Game We Play" (LP Version) - 4:53
3. "This Lil' Game We Play" (Instrumental) - 5:00
4. "This Lil' Game We Play" (Acapella) - 5:08

== Weekly charts ==
Chart (1995)	Peak position
US Billboard Hot 100 (Billboard)	15
US Hot R&B/Hip-Hop Songs (Billboard)	4
US Rhythmic (Billboard)	4

=== Year-end charts ===
Chart (1995)	Position
U.S. Billboard Hot 100	68
