= Tiffany Villarreal =

American contemporary R&B singer

- Born: Tiffany Villarreal
- Origin: San Antonio, Texas, U.S.
- Genres: R&B
- Occupations: Singer; songwriter; record producer
- Years active: 1996–present
- Labels: Motown; Rae; Virgin

Tiffany Villarreal is an American R&B singer from San Antonio, Texas. Initially a member of the girl group 702, she provided backing vocals on Baby Bash's 2004 single "Shorty DooWop". She did so on Raekwon's 2004 single "The Hood" as a credited performer, as well as Flo Rida's 2007 single "In the Ayer".

She signed with Universal Records to release her self-titled debut studio album (2004), which only saw a Japanese release. The album features guest appearances from Raekwon and Sheek Louch.

== Career ==
In 1996, she briefly joined R&B girl group 702 along with Kameelah Williams as replacements for original members Orish Grinstead and Amelia Cruz, Tiffany later departed the group for a solo career and signed to RCA Records. Missy Elliott was enlisted as the executive producer for her debut. However, due to the folding of RCA, Villarreal's debut album was shelved. Following her leave from RCA, Villarreal signed to Pharrell Williams' Star Trak Entertainment as one-third member of the Latina group Affair with Natasha Ramos and Vanessa Marquez. She had also signed to Dr. Dre's Aftermath Entertainment imprint. However, she later left to sign with Motown Records. Again, she moved, this time for a deal with Raekwon's Rae Records and Virgin Records.

== Discography ==
Studio albums

- Tiffany Villarreal (2004)

Other appearances

- Back To Me – Fantasia – "Trust Him" (writing credits)
- Until the End of Time – Tupac Shakur – "Fuck Friendz" (featured artist)
- Mail On Sunday – Flo Rida – "In The Ayer" (background vocals)
- The Lex Diamond Story – Raekwon – "The Hood" (featured artist)
- Tha Smokin' Nephew – Baby Bash – "Shorty Doowop" (featured artist)

== Tiffany Villarreal (2004) ==
Tiffany Villarreal

Studio album by Tiffany Villarreal
- Released: July 4, 2004
- Genres: R&B, hip hop
- Label: Universal
- Producers: Tse Williams; Sean Young; Troy Johnson; Tiffany Villarreal (exec's.); Chris Gehringer (Album Mastered)

=== Track listing ===
1. "The Real Intro"
2. "Fire"
3. "Rewind the Time" (feat. Raekwon)
4. "You, Yourself & You"
5. "Erotic Interlude"
6. "Erotic"
7. "Go to Work"
8. "Holla at Me "
9. "For My Girls"
10. "Better Woman"
11. "Us"
12. "Set You Free"
13. "Silent Gun" (feat. Sheek Louch) *
14. "Nine Months" *

* – Indicates Japanese version only bonus tracks
