= Charles Farrar =

American songwriter, composer, producer

- Born: New Jersey, United States
- Education: Morehouse College
- Musical career
- Genres: R&B; soul; hip-hop
- Occupations: Songwriter; composer; producer
- Formerly of: The Characters

Charles Farrar is an American songwriter, composer, and producer, best known for his songwriting work with vocal groups SWV, 702, Today, and Shades. In the late 1990s/early 2000s, Farrar, alongside Troy Taylor, was a member of "The Characters": a production duo that worked on Boyz II Men's Cooleyhighharmony, as well as with Kenny Lattimore and numerous other artists.

In 2001, Farrar was nominated to serve on the board of directors for the American Society of Composers, Authors and Publishers (ASCAP). He was also a part owner in New York City-area recording studio The Weight Room.

== The Characters ==
The Characters
- Genres: R&B; soul; new jack swing; pop; hip-hop
- Years active: 1990–2003
- Label: Character Music Corporation / DreamWorks Records / Chrysalis Music
- Members: Troy Taylor; Charles Farrar

The Characters were a Grammy Award-winning American songwriting and production duo best known for their work with 1990s R&B vocal groups such as Boyz II Men, Destiny's Child, and Riff. The pairing was formed when Troy Taylor, signed in early 1990 to a solo record deal with Motown, decided to instead explore songwriting and production for other artists with fellow songwriter and producer Farrar. After commencing work with Farrar, two of the songs originally created for Taylor's debut album were repurposed and placed onto Boyz II Men's acclaimed debut project Cooleyhighharmony. They would reunite with the group to create "Jezzebel" for 1994's Grammy-winning II album.

Several years later, solo R&B artist Johntá Austin, working with the duo at the time to create his own debut project at the age of 13, was experiencing instability at RCA Records as a result of internal label politics. Austin was added to the writing team as an occasional member when he was subsequently dropped and his project was shelved, and their first writing collaborations as a trio resulted in "Realize" for Jason Weaver, "Here For You" for SWV's 1997 album Release Some Tension and hit single "Sweet Lady" for Tyrese Gibson.

Taylor and Farrar also diversified into forming and signing girl groups throughout the 1990s, such as OSCAR (a multi-racial New jack swing/R&B quartet who released 1992 album Spotlight) under their production company Character Music Corporation.

== Songwriting and production credits ==
Credits are courtesy of Discogs, Spotify, and AllMusic.

Title	Year	Artist	Album
"Happiness"	1989	Nyki Nicole	Non-album single
"Every Little Thing About You"	1990	Today	The New Formula
"Self Centered"	1990	Today	The New Formula
"Gonna Make You Mine"	1990	Today	The New Formula
"Little Things"	1991	Boyz II Men	Cooleyhighharmony
"Your Love"	1991	Boyz II Men	Cooleyhighharmony
"Just A Cover Up"	1991	Boyz II Men	Cooleyhighharmony (2009 Expanded Edition)
"Can't Be Liked"	1991	Boyz II Men	Cooleyhighharmony (2009 Expanded Edition)
"Chivalry" (The Characters Remix)	1991	Babyface	A Closer Look
"I'll Be There For You"	1991	Lateasha	Lateasha
"Mature Love"	1991	Keisha Jackson	Keisha
"All Night Lovin'"	1991	Keisha Jackson	Keisha
"All Night Lovin' Interlude"	1991	Keisha Jackson	Keisha
"Step by Step (Gonna Make You Mine)"	1992	Wendy Moten	Wendy Moten
"Take Me Back to Love Again"	1992	Kathy Sledge	Heart
"I've Gotta Have It"	1992	3rd Avenue	Let's Talk About Love
"The Minute You Fall In Love"	1992	3rd Avenue	Let's Talk About Love
"I'm Calling You (Do-Po-Liddle-Lo-Le-Yeah)"	1992	OSCAR	Spotlight
"Just For You"	1992	OSCAR	Spotlight
"Let Me Make It Better"	1992	OSCAR	Spotlight
"I'll Be There For You"	1992	OSCAR	Spotlight
"Spotlight"	1992	OSCAR	Spotlight
"Keep Touching Me"	1992	OSCAR	Spotlight
"How I Spend My Time"	1992	OSCAR	Spotlight
"Give Me A Reason"	1992	OSCAR	Spotlight
"Just Being With You"	1992	Countess Vaughn	Countess
"Once More"	1992	Countess Vaughn	Countess
"Skyy's The Limit"	1992	Skyy	Nearer To You
"Work It Out"	1993	Perfect Gentlemen	The Perfect Gentlemen
"Don't Go Nowhere"	1993	Riff	To Whom It May Concern
"(Seek And You'll Find) The Kinda Right Baby"	1994	Groove U	Tender Love
"Old Becomes New"	1994	Groove U	Tender Love
"Call And I'll Answer"	1994	Groove U	Tender Love
"Pass It Over"	1994	Fourmula	Non-album single
"Floating	1994	Debelah Morgan	Debelah
"Win You Over" (With Troy Taylor)	1994	Debelah Morgan	Debelah
"Jezzebel"	1994	Boyz II Men	II
"I Can't Tell You Why"	1995	Brownstone	From the Bottom Up
"Best Friend" (Character R&B Mix featuring Channel Live)	1995	Brandy	Brandy
"I'm Sorry"	1995	Solo	Solo
"My Cherie Amour"	1995	Tony Thompson	Sexsational
"Come Over"	1995	Tony Thompson	Sexsational
"Goodbye Eyes"	1995	Tony Thompson	Sexsational
"Love Today"	1995	Vertical Hold	Head First
"Love In An Elevator"	1996	Johnny Gill	Let's Get the Mood Right
"Simply Say I Love U" (Featuring Stevie Wonder)	1996	Johnny Gill	Let's Get the Mood Right
"So Gentle" (Featuring Ronnie DeVoe)	1996	Johnny Gill	Let's Get the Mood Right
"Get Down Like Dat"	1996	702	No Doubt
"No Doubt"	1996	702	No Doubt
"Show You My Love"	1996	702	No Doubt
"All I Want"	1996	702	No Doubt
"Just Let Me Know"	1996	Horace Brown	Horace Brown
"Realize"	1996	Jason Weaver	Stay With Me (Shelved)
"Your Body's Callin'"	1996	Norman Brown	Better Days Ahead
"Facts of Love"	1996	Norman Brown	Better Days Ahead
"Love Like This" (Featuring Lil' Cease)	1997	SWV	Release Some Tension
"Lose Myself"	1997	SWV	Release Some Tension
"Here For You"	1997	SWV	Release Some Tension
"Who Are You"	1997	Shades	Shades
"Tell Me (I'll Be Around)"	1997	Shades	Shades
"I Believe"	1997	Shades	Shades
"How Deep Is Your Love"	1997	Shades	Shades
"Time Will Reveal"	1997	Shades	Shades
"All He's Supposed to Be"	1997	Johnny Gill	The 6th Man (soundtrack)
"Jam Knock"	1997	Brian McKnight	Anytime
"Dance Wit Me" (Featuring Doug E. Fresh)	1998	Miss Jones	The Other Woman
"Smooth"	1998	Miss Jones	The Other Woman
"In And Out Of My Life"	1998	Ali	Crucial / Bitter Honey
"Once A Fool"	1998	Destiny's Child & William Floyd	eMusic Presents NFL Jams
"Work It Out"	1998	Boyz II Men & Garrison Hearst	eMusic Presents NFL Jams
"Let's Get It Started"	1998	Johnny Gill & Corey Harris	eMusic Presents NFL Jams
"Sweet Lady"	1999	Tyrese	Tyrese
"What'cha Gonna Do"	1999	Eternal	Eternal
"Treat Me Like a Lady"	1999	Eternal	Eternal
"Absent From You"	1999	Eternal	Eternal
"He Is"	1999	Eternal	Eternal
"Never Let You Go Away"	1999	Rome	Thank You (Shelved)
"I Really Do Love You"	1999	Beverly	Heart and Soul (Shelved)
"Do It Like Us"	1999	Rudy	Non-album single
"Come Correct"	2000	Before Dark	Daydreamin'
"Can We Make Love"	2000	Profyle	Nothin' but Drama
"Candles"	2000	Pru	Pru
"Got Me High"	2000	Pru	Pru
"Can't Compare Your Love"	2000	Pru	Pru
"Sketches of Pain"	2000	Pru	Pru
"Hold On"	2000	L.V.	How Long
"Just Because"	2000	F.A.T.E	For All That's Endured
"Weekend"	2001	Kenny Lattimore	Weekend
"Baby You're the One"	2001	Kenny Lattimore	Weekend
"Can You Feel Me" (Featuring Shanice)	2001	Kenny Lattimore	Weekend
"If Love Is What You Want"	2001	Kenny Lattimore	Weekend
"Right Down to It"	2001	Kenny Lattimore	Weekend
"Better Than"	2001	Damage	Since You've Been Gone
"Money"	2001	Smash Task	Selections From "The Dirty D.I.S.T.R.I.C.T."
"I Want You For Myself"	2001	V.A.	One By One
"Nobody Else"	2001	V.A.	One By One
"Don't Ya Hate It"	2001	V.A.	One By One
"I'm The Man"	2001	V.A.	One By One
"Next To Me"	2001	V.A.	One By One
"Breathe"	2001	V.A.	One By One
"It Don't Make No Sense"	2001	V.A.	One By One
"Swole"	2001	V.A.	One By One
"You Could've Called"	2001	V.A.	One By One
"It's Cool"	2001	V.A.	One By One
"We Make Love"	2001	V.A.	One By One
"Pretty Girl"	2001	V.A.	One By One
"I'm Done"	2001	V.A.	One By One
"I Want You For Myself (Acoustic)"	2001	V.A.	One By One
"Crave"	2001	4Shades	4Shades
"Why I Love You"	2002	B2K	Pandemonium!
"Understanding"	2002	B2K	B2K
"Baby Girl"	2002	B2K	B2K
"Baby Girl (Terri's Theme)"	2002	B2K	Barbershop (soundtrack)
"I'm Wit It"	2002	702	Star
"You"	2002	Ruff Endz	Someone to Love You
"Sexy Lover"	2002	Darius Rucker	Back to Then
"When's the Last Time"	2002	Darius Rucker	Back to Then
"Him"	2004	Frankee	The Good, the Bad, the Ugly
"Love Is Free" (featuring Maluca)	2015	Robyn & La Bagatelle Magique	Love Is Free (EP)
"Give It 2 U"	2020	J. Brown	Forever Yours
"Sunrise Sunset"	2020	J. Brown	Forever Yours

== Awards and nominations ==
Year	Awarding Body	Award	Result	Ref
1995	37th Annual Grammy Awards	Grammy Award for Best R&B Album (II)	Won	
2000	ASCAP Pop Awards	Award-Winning Song ("Sweet Lady")	Won	
2000	ASCAP Rhythm & Soul Awards	Award-Winning Song ("Sweet Lady")	Won	
