= Pootie Tang (soundtrack) =

2001 soundtrack album by various artists

Soundtrack album by Various artists
- Released: June 26, 2001
- Genre: Hip hop; urban; dance
- Length: 54:38
- Label: Hollywood

Professional ratings
Review scores
Source	Rating
AllMusic	2.5/5 stars

Music from and Inspired By the Motion Picture Pootie Tang is the soundtrack to Louis C.K.'s 2001 comedy film Pootie Tang. It was released on June 26, 2001 through Hollywood Records and consisted of R&B and hip hop music. The album peaked at #51 on the Top R&B/Hip-Hop Albums and #22 on the Top Soundtracks and featured one charting single "Southern Gul" by Erykah Badu & Rahzel, which made it to #24 on the Hot R&B/Hip-Hop Singles & Tracks.

== Track listing ==
No.	Title	Length
1.	"Pootie Tangin" (performed by 702)	3:53
2.	"Dirty Dee" (performed by Magic & Master P)	3:09
3.	"Comin' Up on Somp'n" (performed by E-40 & Suga-T)	3:34
4.	"Poison" (performed by Bell Biv DeVoe)	4:22
5.	"Make Em Say Uhh #2" (performed by Master P, Fiend, Mia X, Silkk the Shocker, Snoop Doggy Dogg & Mystikal)	3:57
6.	"Southern Girl" (performed by Erykah Badu & Rahzel)	3:10
7.	"I Should've Told You" (performed by Ideal)	4:29
8.	"I Want to Be Your Man" (performed by Zapp)	4:09
9.	"A Woman Needs to Be Loved" (performed by K.K.)	2:45
10.	"You Know How We Do" (performed by Shaquille O'Neal)	4:17
11.	"You Know What?" (performed by Lil' J)	4:02
12.	"Yesterday" (performed by Roscoe & Nate Dogg)	3:54
13.	"Why Pootie Why?" (performed by Karl Clanton)	4:22
14.	"Ode to Pootie" (performed by Tara Jeffers, Qiana Drew & Lorria Richards)	4:35
Total length:		54:38
