= Sock It 2 Me =

Single by Missy Elliott featuring Da Brat

from the album Supa Dupa Fly
- B-side: "Pass da Blunt"; "Release the Tension"
- Released: September 21, 1997
- Recorded: 1996
- Studio: Master Sound Studios (Virginia Beach, Virginia)
- Genre: Hip hop; R&B
- Length: 4:21 (radio version); 4:17 (album version)
- Label: Goldmind; Elektra
- Songwriters: Melissa Elliott; Shawntae Harris; William Hart; Thom Bell; Timothy Mosley
- Producer: Timbaland

Missy Elliott singles chronology
"What About Us" (1997)	"Sock It 2 Me" (1997)	"Beep Me 911" (1998)

Da Brat singles chronology
"Not Tonight" (Ladies Night remix) (1997)	"Sock It 2 Me" (1997)	"The Party Continues" (1998)

Music video
- "Sock It 2 Me" on YouTube

"Sock It 2 Me" is a song recorded by American rapper Missy "Misdemeanor" Elliott featuring American rapper Da Brat. It was written by Shawntae Harris, William Hart, Thom Bell and producer Timothy "Timbaland" Mosley for her debut album Supa Dupa Fly (1997) and released as the album's second single in a slightly re-recorded form. The song is based on a sample from the 1968 single "Ready or Not Here I Come (Can't Hide from Love)" by the Delfonics.

The track peaked at number 12 on the U.S. Billboard Hot 100, and reached the top ten on the Hot R&B/Hip-Hop Singles & Tracks, the Rhythmic Top 40, and on the Hot Dance Music/Maxi-Singles Sales charts.

A B-side, "Release the Tension", was later re-recorded by SWV as "Release Some Tension" from their album of the same name.

== Music video ==
Directed by Hype Williams, the music video takes place on a remote planet where robot monsters are chasing Missy Elliott & Lil' Kim, who are wearing red and white space suits. Towards the end of the video, Da Brat rescues the pair, before rapping her verse in a black and yellow space suit. One notable moment in the video is when Elliott and other dancers perform Michael Jackson's "Smooth Criminal" dance aboard a space ship. Their overall costumes are also inspired by characters from the Mega Man series.

== Formats and track listings ==
These are the formats and track listings of major single-releases of "Sock It 2 Me."

US 12" single

Side A

1. "Sock It 2 Me" (Radio Version) (featuring Da Brat)
2. "Sock It 2 Me" (LP Version - Dirty) (featuring Da Brat)

Side B

1. "Pass Da Blunt" (LP Version - Dirty) (featuring Timbaland)
2. "Sock It 2 Me" (Instrumental)
3. "Sock It 2 Me" (A cappella) (featuring Da Brat)

International 12" single

Side A

1. "Sock It 2 Me" (LP Version) (featuring Da Brat) - 4:22
2. "Sock It 2 Me" (Radio Version) (featuring Da Brat) - 4:21
3. "Sock It 2 Me" (Instrumental) - 4:46
4. "Sock It 2 Me" (A cappella) (featuring Da Brat) - 4:33

Side B

1. "The Rain (Supa Dupa Fly)" (LP Version Dirty) - 4:11
2. "The Rain (Supa Dupa Fly)" (Instrumental) - 4:10
3. "The Rain (Supa Dupa Fly)" (Acapella) - 4:10
4. "Release The Tension" - 4:11

12" single

Side A

1. "Sock It 2 Me" (Radio Version) (featuring Da Brat) - 4:21
2. "Sock It 2 Me" (Instrumental) - 4:46

Side B

1. "Sock It 2 Me" (Acapella) (featuring Da Brat) - 4:33
2. "Release the Tension" - 4:11

German CD Maxi-single

1. "Sock It 2 Me" (Radio Version) (featuring Da Brat) - 4:21
2. "Sock It 2 Me" (Instrumental) - 4:46
3. "Sock It 2 Me" (A cappella) (featuring Da Brat) - 4:33
4. "Release The Tension" - 4:11

== Charts and certifications ==
=== Weekly charts ===
Chart (1997–1998)	Peak position
Germany (GfK)	41
Netherlands (Dutch Top 40 Tipparade)	5
Netherlands (Single Top 100)	56
New Zealand (Recorded Music NZ)	5
Scottish Singles Sales (Official Charts)	70
Sweden (Sverigetopplistan)	59
UK Singles (Official Charts)	33
UK Dance (Official Charts)	7
UK Hip Hop/R&B (Official Charts)	7
US Billboard Hot 100	12
US Dance Singles Sales (Billboard) With "The Rain (Supa Dupa Fly)"	3
US Hot R&B/Hip-Hop Songs (Billboard) With "The Rain (Supa Dupa Fly)"	4
US Rhythmic Airplay (Billboard)	6

=== Year-end charts ===
Chart (1997)	Position
UK Urban (Music Week)	40

Chart (1998)	Position
New Zealand (Recorded Music NZ)	43
U.S. Billboard Hot 100	93

=== Certifications ===
Region	Certification	Certified units/sales
United States (RIAA)	Gold	600,000
