= Subway (group) =

American contemporary R&B group

- Origin: Chicago, Illinois, U.S.
- Genres: R&B
- Years active: 1992–1998
- Labels: Motown, Biv 10
- Past members: Keith Thomas; Trerail Puckett; Eric McNeal; Roy Jones

Subway was an American contemporary R&B group, which featured Keith Thomas and his brother Trerail Puckett, and their close friends, Eric McNeal and Roy Jones. The group was signed by Michael Bivins (of New Edition and Bell Biv DeVoe) to his Motown-distributed label Biv 10. They debuted in 1995 with the hit single "This Lil' Game We Play" featuring labelmates 702 that reached #15 on the Billboard charts. The song was produced and written by Gerald Levert and Edwin Nicholas and was billed as "Subway featuring 702". The single set the group off to a good start, going gold and selling nearly a million copies.

Their debut album was titled Good Times and was released later that year.

Following his work with Subway, Eric McNeal continued his career as a recording artist and songwriter. In 2007, McNeal released a solo EP produced by Ricky Jacox, marking a new chapter in his musical career and expanding his work beyond the group that first introduced him to a national audience.

== Chart positions ==
=== Albums ===
| Year | Album | Peak Position | | |
| Year | Album | Billboard Hot 200 | Billboard Top R&B/Hip-Hop Albums | Billboard Top Heatseekers |
| 1995 | Good Times | 101 | 23 | 1 |

=== Singles ===
| Year | Song | Peak Position | | |
| Year | Song | Billboard Hot 100 | Billboard Hot R&B/Hip-Hop Singles & Tracks | Billboard Rhythmic Top 40 |
| 1994 | "This Lil' Game We Play" (featuring 702) (Certified Gold) | 15 | 4 | 4 |
| 1995 | "Fire" | 91 | 34 | - |
| 1995 | "This Is Not a Goodbye" | - | 85 | - |
| 1996 | "I'll Make Your Dreams Come True (from "Kazaam")" | - | 64 | - |
