= Slime Cup =

Children's television team competition show by Nickelodeon

Slime Cup is a children's television show broadcast by Nickelodeon in which sixteen teams of players compete in a series of slime-filled challenges. As of 2019, four seasons have been aired.

The series was first broadcast in the US and will be adapted for Australian television on July 1, 2016, with Kristy Best as the host.

The sixteen teams consist of: Slime Brothers, Waddling Ducks, Slime Sisters, Bubbly Banana Girls, Double Threat, Kooky Cousins, Regular Bros, Dynamite Divas, Team Tissue Box, Soccer Skilled Slimers, Slime Patrol, Daring Divas, Cuckoo Coconuts, Boss Besties, Besties in Braids, and Mini Blacks.

== Slime Cup Celebrity Golf Tournament ==
In February 2022, Nickelodeon announced its one-hour episode of Slime Cup Celebrity Tournament. It will feature four teams each with three members, including a professional golfer, a celebrity, and a Nickelodeon star, on a golf course created by the channel itself.

=== Participants ===
==== Professional golfers ====
- Jon Rahm
- Collin Morikawa
- Justin Thomas
- Lexi Thompson

==== NFL players ====
- Saquon Barkley
- Isaiah Crews
- Terry Crews
- Justin Herbert

==== Nickelodeon actors ====
- Kate Godfrey
- Jaidyn Triplett
- Tyler Wladis
- Gabrielle Nevaeh Green
