= Good Burger =

1997 film by Brian Robbins

- Theatrical release poster
- Directed by: Brian Robbins
- Written by: Dan Schneider; Kevin Kopelow Heath Seifert
- Based on: All That by: Michael Tollin; Brian Robbins; Characters created by: Dan Schneider; Kevin Kopelow; Heath Seifert
- Produced by: Michael Tollin; Brian Robbins
- Starring: Kenan Thompson; Kel Mitchell; Abe Vigoda
- Cinematography: Mac Ahlberg
- Edited by: Anita Brandt-Burgoyne
- Music by: Stewart Copeland
- Production companies: Paramount Pictures; Nickelodeon Movies; Tollin/Robbins Productions
- Distributed by: Paramount Pictures
- Release dates: July 19, 1997 (Paramount Pictures Studios); July 25, 1997 (United States)
- Running time: 95 minutes
- Country: United States
- Language: English
- Budget: $8.5 million
- Box office: $23.7 million

Good Burger is a 1997 American teen comedy film starring Kenan Thompson and Kel Mitchell. It was directed by Brian Robbins, and written by Dan Schneider with Kevin Kopelow and Heath Seifert. The film is a spin-off of the "Good Burger" comedy sketch from the Nickelodeon variety series All That, with Mitchell reprising his role as Ed. The story follows Dexter Reed, a high school student who, to pay off the damages he made to his teacher's car, takes a summer job at the titular fast-food restaurant, where he and Ed, his dimwitted co-worker, stumble upon an evil plot by a rival fast-food restaurant.

The film was produced by Nickelodeon Movies and Tollin/Robbins Productions. It premiered on July 19, 1997, and was released worldwide on July 25 of the same year by Paramount Pictures. The film received mixed reviews from critics and grossed $23.7 million. In the years after its release, the film received a cult following.

A sequel titled Good Burger 2 was released on November 22, 2023, on Paramount+.

== Plot ==
On the first day of summer, slacker high school student Dexter Reed takes his mother's car on a joyride while she is away on a business trip but is indirectly involved in a car crash with his school teacher, Mr. Wheat. With no driver's license or car insurance, Dexter is in danger of going to jail, but Mr. Wheat agrees to let him pay for the damage in exchange for not calling the police on him. With the damage estimated at $1,900 (which later becomes $2,500), plus $800 to fix his mother's car, Dexter decides to take a summer job to pay for the expenses.

After his dismissal from the new and soon-to-open Mondo Burger restaurant for clashing with the owner and manager Kurt Bozwell, he ends up working for Good Burger instead, mainly as the delivery boy. There, he meets and reluctantly befriends the dimwitted but well-meaning cashier Ed alongside its other employees. While both are working together, Dexter soon recognizes Ed who caused his car crash, but eventually forgives him.

After its grand opening, Mondo Burger becomes an immediate success with its large burgers, hurting Good Burger's business. As Good Burger was days away from closing down, Dexter discovers that Ed made a tasty sauce for his lunch and suggests adding it to the burgers, which saves Good Burger and vastly increases its sales. Dexter exploits Ed's gullibility to extort money from him so that he can pay off his debt sooner, having him sign a contract that gives Dexter 80% of the bonus he receives for his sauce while warning Ed to never reveal the recipe to anyone. After failing to entice Ed with a higher hourly wage at Mondo Burger, Kurt, who wants the secret sauce for his restaurant and Good Burger shut down, sends an employee named Roxanne to seduce him into revealing the recipe. However, while on a double date with Dexter and co-worker Monique, Ed accidentally and clumsily injures her repeatedly, and she quits her job.

The next day, Monique finds Dexter's contract and scolds him for taking advantage of Ed, causing Dexter to feel remorseful. Dexter tries to apologize to Ed, but before he can do so, he and Ed discover a stray dog rejecting a discarded Mondo Burger for a Good Burger. Suspicious, the two infiltrate Mondo Burger's kitchen in disguise and discover that their burgers are artificially enhanced with an illegal food chemical known as Triampathol. Kurt discovers them and has them committed to the Demented Hills Asylum to prevent them from sharing their discovery. Afterward, Kurt and his henchmen break into Good Burger and taint Ed's secret sauce with a synthetic toxin called shark poison. Otis, an elderly employee who was sleeping on the premises, catches them and attempts to call the police, but Kurt sends him to Demented Hills as well. After Otis informs Ed and Dexter about Kurt's scheme, they escape from Demented Hills and commandeer an ice cream truck to head back to Good Burger. Two Demented Hills employees chase after them in a truck, but Ed pelts their windshield with ice cream, eventually obstructing their view and causing them to crash. Ed arrives at Good Burger just in time to prevent an elderly woman from eating the poisoned sauce.

Ed and Dexter return to Mondo Burger to expose their crimes to the police. While Dexter creates a distraction, Ed takes multiple cans of Triampathol and pours them into the meat grinder. As Kurt corners Dexter on the roof, Ed suddenly arrives with an empty can just before Mondo Burger collapses, as the burgers start exploding due to the excessive Triampathol. Afterwards, Mondo Burger is shut down and Kurt is arrested for poisoning Good Burger's sauce and using illegal Triampathol on his meat. After giving Mr. Wheat a down payment, Dexter apologizes to Ed for taking advantage of him and tears up the contract, telling him that he gets to keep all the profits. Ed and Dexter return to Good Burger, where their co-workers hail them as heroes.

== Cast ==
- Kenan Thompson as Dexter Reed, a 16-year-old high school student who gets a summer job at Good Burger following an accidental car crash with his school teacher Mr. Wheat's car
- Kel Mitchell as Ed, the dimwitted 15-year-old cashier of Good Burger
- Abe Vigoda as Otis, an elderly Good Burger employee who works the deep-fryers
- Dan Schneider as Mr. Baily, the owner and manager of Good Burger and Dexter and Ed's boss
- Shar Jackson as Monique, a Good Burger employee and Dexter's love interest
- Jan Schweiterman as Kurt Bozwell, the owner of rival fast food place Mondo Burger
- Linda Cardellini as Heather, a Demented Hills patient who has a crush on Ed
- Sinbad as Mr. Wheat, Dexter's accident-prone teacher
- Ron Lester as Spatch, the head fry cook of Good Burger
- Josh Server as Fizz, the drive-thru employee of Good Burger
- Ginny Schreiber as Deedee, a female employee at Good Burger and a vegetarian
- Shaquille O'Neal as himself
- George Clinton as Dancing Crazy, a Demented Hills patient
- Robert Wuhl as an angry customer
- Marques Houston as Jake, Dexter's schoolmate
- J. August Richards as Griffin, one of Kurt's henchmen
- Hamilton Von Watts as Troy, one of Kurt's henchmen
- Carmen Electra as Roxanne, a spy for Mondo Burger who attempted to get the recipe for Ed's sauce (uncredited)
- Floyd Levine as the Ice Cream Man
- Lori Beth Denberg as Connie Muldoon, a motormouthed customer
- Carmit Bachar as a Demented Hills dancer
- Kelly Devine as a Demented Hills dancer
- Matt Gallant as a reporter
- Brian Peck as an upset customer

== Production ==
Filming for Good Burger took place over six weeks from March 9 to April 21, 1997. Most of its scenes were recorded along Glendora Avenue in West Covina, California, including at a restaurant currently known as Peter's El Loco. The role of Kurt Bozwell went to Jan Schweiterman, who died on February 28, 2025.

== Release and reception ==
=== Box office ===
Good Burger was released on July 25, 1997, by Paramount Pictures. Theatrical screenings were preceded by an episode of Nickelodeon's series Action League Now! titled "Rock-a-Big Baby". In its opening weekend, the film grossed $7.1 million, finishing #5 at the US box office. It went on to gross $23.7 million worldwide. It was released in the United Kingdom on February 13, 1998, where it reached #14.

=== Critical response ===
Rotten Tomatoes gives the film an approval rating of 33% based on 45 reviews and an average rating of 4.3/10. The consensus reads, "Good Burger might please hardcore fans of the 1990s Nickelodeon TV series that launched leads Kenan and Kel to stardom, but for all others, it will likely prove a comedy that is neither satisfyingly rare nor well done." On Metacritic the film has a score of 41 out of 100 based on 17 critics, indicating "mixed or average" reviews.

Lisa Alspector of Chicago Reader wrote, "The perceived notion that kids want their movies fast and furious is barely in evidenced in this 1997 comedy, a laboriously slow suburban adventure in which a teenager's summer of leisure slips through his fingers when he has to get a job—an experience that proves almost life-threatening because of the cutthroat competition between two burger joints." Andy Seiler of USA Today gave the film two stars out of four, saying that, "Good Burger is not very well done, but it does have energy."

Leonard Klady of Variety wrote, "The meat of the piece is definitely FDA cinematically approved, and perfect if you like this brand of entertainment with the works." Siskel and Ebert gave it two thumbs down on the July 26, 1997 episode of their program. Gene Siskel disliked the film more than Roger Ebert did, calling it a "stupid kids comedy". In his other review for the Chicago Sun-Times, Ebert gave the film two stars out of four, writing "It didn't do much for me, but I am prepared to predict that its target audience will have a good time."

Retrospective reviews well after the initial release have described its continued popularity; Nathan Rabin said that the film "obviously connected with a lot of children at the time of the film's release and holds up surprisingly well 18 years later." Courtney Eckerle said, "The 90s generation will never forget [this deliciously terrible movie]" and Tara Aquino of Mental Floss called it "a silly cult hit that's indelibly a part of Generation Y."

== Other media ==
=== Home media ===
Paramount Home Video released the film on VHS on February 17, 1998, with the cassettes specially made of orange plastic, and on DVD on May 27, 2003, with a lack of bonus features.

The film was released on Blu-ray on February 16, 2021. On July 19, 2022, a limited edition Blu-ray steelbook of the film was released to commemorate its 25th anniversary. Like the original DVD and first edition Blu-ray, the 25th anniversary lacks any special features except for the original "Good Burger" sketch from All That.

=== Publications ===
- 1997: Joseph Locke: Good Burger: A Novelization, Pocket Books, ISBN 978-0671016920
- 1998: Steve Holland: Good Burger 2 Go, Aladdin, ISBN 978-0671023997

=== Soundtrack ===
A soundtrack containing hip-hop, R&B, funk and punk rock was released on July 15, 1997, by Capitol Records. It peaked at 101 on the Billboard 200 and 65 on the Top R&B/Hip-Hop Albums. It features the single "All I Want" by 702, which reached number thirty-five on the Billboard Hot 100 chart.

== Sequel ==
After twenty-six years since the original film's release, a direct sequel was released on November 22, 2023, through Paramount+. Both Thompson and Mitchell returned to reprise their roles as Dexter Reed and Ed respectively. Additional cast members of Good Burger who appeared in Good Burger 2 included Shar Jackson, Josh Server, Carmen Electra, Lori Beth Denberg, George Clinton, and Sinbad.
