= No Doubt (702 album) =

Studio album by 702
- Released: October 8, 1996
- Length: 43:47
- Labels: Biv 10; Motown
- Producers: The Characters; Armando Colon; Chad "Dr. Seuss" Elliott; Donell Jones; Majesty; George R. Pearson; Starrstrukk.; Malik Pendleton; Rashad Smith; Terry "T-Rock" Williams

702 chronology
No Doubt (1996)	702 (1999)

Singles from No Doubt
- 1. "Steelo" Released: August 20, 1996; 2. "Get It Together" Released: January 28, 1997; 3. "All I Want" Released: July 8, 1997; 4. "No Doubt" Released: November 17, 1997

No Doubt is the debut studio album from American R&B group 702. It was released by Biv 10 Records on October 8, 1996, while distribution was helmed by Motown. The album peaked at number 82 on the US Billboard 200. By November 1997, it was certified Gold in sales by the Recording Industry Association of America (RIAA), after sales reached 700,000 copies in the United States.

== Critical reception ==
Professional ratings
Review scores
Source	Rating
Allmusic	2.5/5 stars

Stephen Thomas Erlewine of Allmusic gave No Doubt a mixed review, remarking that it "has a couple of fine moments," but that the group's "fusion of street-oriented rap and urban soul doesn't quite gel over the course of the album."

== Chart performance ==
The album peaked at eighty-two on the US Billboard 200 and reached the twenty-fourth spot on the Top R&B/Hip-Hop Albums chart. The album was certified gold in November 1997.

== Track listing ==
No.	Title	Writer(s)	Producer(s)	Length
1.	"Get Down Like Dat"	Missy Elliott; Charles Farrar; Kevin McKenzie; Jean-Claude Olivier; Rashad Smith; Troy Taylor	The Characters; Smith; McKenzie^{[a]}; Poke^{[b]}	4:11
2.	"Steelo" (featuring Missy Elliott)	M. Elliott; Chad Elliott; George R. Pearson; Gordon Sumner	C. Elliott; Pearson	4:17
3.	"No Doubt"	Farrar; Taylor	The Characters Co/Produced by StarrStrukk ^b	4:20
4.	"Show You My Love"	Farrar; Taylor; Johntá Austin	The Characters	4:19
5.	"Not Gonna"	M. Elliott; C. Elliott; Majesty	C. Elliott; Majesty	4:13
6.	"All I Want"	Farrar; Berry Gordy; Alphonso Mizell; Freddie Perren; Deke Richards; Taylor	The Characters	3:59
7.	"Round & Round"	Al'Terik Wardrick; Chris Martin; Christopher Wallace; Dupré Kelly; Keith Elam; Kevin Hansford; Marlon Williams; M. Elliott; Osten Harvey	Terry "T-Rock" Williams	4:21
8.	"Word Iz Bond" (featuring Shyheim)	Malik Pendleton; Matthew Wilder; Greg Prestopino	Malik "Zavy Kid" Pendleton	4:19
9.	"Get It Together"	Donell Jones	Jones	4:51
10.	"Finding My Way"	Nicole Johnson; Pendleton	Pendleton	5:01

International bonus track
No.	Title	Writer(s)	Producer(s)	Length
11.	"Steelo (Remix)" (featuring Missy Elliott)	M. Elliott; R. Smith; John Vastano	R. Smith; Armando Colon^{[a]}	3:33

Notes

- ^{^a} denotes co-producer
- ^{^b} denotes additional producer

== Personnel ==
Information taken from Allmusic.

- a&r – Lisa Smith Craig
- administration – Steve Cook
- assistant engineering – Dave Hancock
- cover photo – Daniela Federici
- design – David Harley
- drum programming – Chad "Dr. Seuss" Elliott, Charles Farrar, Rashad Smith, Terry Williams
- engineering – Brandon Abeln, T-Bone Demmar, Donell Jones, Moise Laporte, Kevin McKenzie, Appolon "Chap" Noel, Eliud "Lou" Ortiz, Mario Rodriquez, Kevin Thomas
- executive chief – André Harrell
- executive producer – Todd Russaw
- hair stylist – Rowan Eugene
- keyboard programming – Terry Williams
- keyboards – Chad "Dr. Seuss" Elliott, Troy Taylor
- make-up – Nzínga
- mastering – Chris Gehringer
- mix engineering – Ben Garrison, Eliud "Lou" Ortiz, Mario Rodriquez, Kevin Thomas
- mixing – Charles "Prince Charles" Alexander, David Dachinger, T-Bone Demmar, Chad "Dr. Seuss" Elliott, Ben Garrison, Eliud "Lou" Ortiz, Malik Pendleton, Mario Rodriquez, Todd Russaw, Rashad Smith, Kevin Thomas, Terry Williams
- photography – Daniela Federici, Michael Lavine
- production – Chad "Dr. Seuss" Elliott, Charles Farrar, Donell Jones, Kevin McKenzie, George R. "Golden Fingers" Pearson, Malik Pendleton, Poke, Rashad Smith, Troy Taylor, StarrStrukk, Terry Williams
- programming – Kevin McKenzie
- project manager – Daryle Lockhart
- rapping – Shyheim
- stylist – Takisha Olugbolagun, Takisha Oluhnolshun
- tray photo – Michael Lavine
- vocal arranging – Missy Elliott, Nicole Johnson, Malik Pendleton, Rashad Smith, Troy Taylor
- vocals (background) – Mary Brown, Orish Grinstead

== Charts ==
Chart (1996)	Peak position
UK R&B Albums (Official Charts)	35
US Billboard 200 (Billboard)	82
US Heatseekers Albums (Billboard)	1
US Top R&B/Hip-Hop Albums (Billboard)	24

== Certifications ==
Region	Certification	Certified units/sales
United States (RIAA)	Gold	500,000^{^}
^{^} Shipments figures based on certification alone.
