= Beep Me 911 =

Single by Missy Elliott featuring 702 and Magoo

from the album Supa Dupa Fly
- Released: March 23, 1998
- Recorded: 1997
- Studio: Master Sound Studios (Virginia Beach, Virginia)
- Genre: Hip hop; R&B
- Length: 4:57
- Label: Goldmind; Elektra
- Songwriters: Melissa Elliott; Timothy Mosley; Melvin Barcliff
- Producer: Timbaland

Missy Elliott singles chronology
"Sock It 2 Me" (1997)	"Beep Me 911" (1998)	"Hit Em wit da Hee" (1998)

702 singles chronology
"No Doubt" (1997)	"Beep Me 911" (1998)	"Where My Girls At?" (1999)

Magoo singles chronology
"What About Us (Swing Mob)" (1994)	"Beep Me 911" (1998)	"Here We Come" (1998)

Music video
- "Beep Me 911" on YouTube

"Beep Me 911" is a song recorded by American rapper and singer Missy "Misdemeanor" Elliott, featuring vocals by R&B trio 702 and rapper Magoo. It was written and composed by Elliott, Melvin Barcliff and Tim "Timbaland" Mosley for her debut album Supa Dupa Fly (1997) and released as the album's third single in 1998.

The lyrics describe Elliott insisting that, if her lover intends to leave her, he should tell her so before going, by any means necessary.

== Music video ==
The video premiered in February 1998 and starts at a pink dollhouse where Elliott is wearing a yellow sparking dress dancing, along with the girls of 702 in the background while singing their verses. In another scene, other dolls are in a big cage dancing with Elliott. A yellow luxury sports car pulls up near the dollhouse and two male dolls wearing tuxedos and pompadours entered. They are seduced and enticed by the girls. However once Elliott appears and the male dolls realize that it's a set-up, the male dolls make an escape out, and sped away but only to be crushed by a giant foot in high heel stilettoes (played by costume designer June Ambrose). The video ends with Elliot seductively blowing a kiss.

== Live performances ==
Elliott performed the song with Magoo and Timbaland during Saturday Night Live on February 14, 1998 (season 23, episode 13).

== Formats and track listings ==
These are the formats and track listings of major single-releases of "Beep Me 911."

U.S. 12" promo single

Side A

1. "Beep Me 911" (Album Version) - 4:58
2. "Beep Me 911" (Instrumental) - 4:57

Side B

1. "Beep Me 911" (Ganja Kru Remix) - 6:27
2. "Beep Me 911" (Acapella) - 4:16

U.S. promo single

Side A

1. "Beep Me 911" (Radio Version)
2. "Beep Me 911" (LP Version Dirty)

Side B

1. "Beep Me 911" (Instrumental)
2. "Beep Me 911" (Acapella)

12" remix promo

Side A

1. "Beep Me 911" (Remix) (Main Version) - 4:20
2. "Beep Me 911" (Remix) (Radio Version) - 4:05

Side B

1. "Beep Me 911" (Remix) (Instrumental) - 4:17
2. "Beep Me 911" (Remix) (Acapella) - 3:51

12" single

Side A

1. "Beep Me 911" (Jason Nevins Beeps Missy Elliott 911 - 12" Version) - 6:03
2. "Beep Me 911" (Radio Version) - 4:24

Side B

1. "Beep Me 911" (Remix - Main Version) - 4:20
2. "Beep Me 911" (Ganja Kru Remix) - 6:27

UK CD Maxi-single

1. "Beep Me 911" (Radio Version) - 4:24
2. "Beep Me 911" (Jason Nevins Beeps Missy Elliott 911 Radio Remix) - 3:55
3. "Beep Me 911" (Jason Nevins Beeps Missy Elliott 911 Extended Remix) - 5:02
4. "Beep Me 911" (Ganja Kru Remix) - 6:27

German 12" Promo

Side A

1. "Beep Me 911" (Jason Nevins Beeps Missy Elliott 911 12" Club Version) - 6:03

Side B

1. "Beep Me 911" (Jason Nevins Beeps Missy Elliott 911 12" Radio Version) - 6:03
2. "Beep Me 911" (US Radio Version) - 4:24

== Charts ==
Chart (1998)	Peak position
New Zealand (Recorded Music NZ)	13
Scottish Singles Sales (Official Charts)	45
UK Singles (Official Charts)	14
UK Dance (Official Charts)	5
UK Hip Hop/R&B (Official Charts)	3
US R&B/Hip-Hop Airplay (Billboard)	13
