= Biv 10 Records =

US record label

- Founded: 1992
- Founder: Michael Bivins

Biv 10 Records was founded by Michael Bivins in 1992, through a joint venture with Motown Records.

== History ==
In the early 1990s, Bivins’ Biv Entertainment management firm scored multiple successes with developing new acts (Boyz II Men, ABC, BBD: the East Coast Family) in conjunction with Motown Records. As a result, Motown bankrolled Bivins his own imprint, Biv 10 Records. The company's logo featured an outline of a hand holding a basketball with the name ‘BIV 10’ printed on the hand above the wrist.

While the label went on to score minor success with teen R&B groups Subway and 702, significant success largely evaded the company. The more prominent acts that Bivins had cultivated, like Boyz II Men, were established before the commencement of the Biv 10 label, and were instead signed to Motown directly—where they remained after the launch.

In 2000, distribution of Biv 10 switched from Motown to Universal Records, with the release of BBD, the studio album from Bell Biv Devoe. In 2002, the label was dismantled & folded into Motown.

This is a list of artists who recorded for Biv 10 Records.
Listed in parentheses are names of affiliated labels for which the artist recorded for Biv 10 in conjunction with.

== Artists ==
- Bell Biv DeVoe
- Boyz II Men
- 702
- Another Bad Creation
- Yvette Nicole Brown (Formerly: Yvette)
- Val Young (Formerly: Lady V)
- MC Brains
- Subway
- The Transitions
- Hayden
- Fruit Punch
- Mag 7
- Rico Anderson
- Big Ant
- 10/10
- TomBoyy
- Whytgize (Formerly: Sudden Impact)
- Cale’
- Khalil
- Mark Finesse
- Tam Rock & E.Q.
- Antuan & Ray (of Mag 7, Antuan now known as Robert Curry, 1/4 member of R&B group Day26)
- P-Nutt
- Shortee Red
- Lil' Nique & DJ Jus
- Tay Boogie
- Mark Wilson (Producer)

== Discography ==
=== Another Bad Creation ===
- 1991: Coolin' at the Playground Ya Know!
- 1993: It Ain't What U Wear, It's How U Play It

=== Val Young ===
- 1985: Seduction
- 1987: Private Conversations

=== Subway ===
- 1995: Good Times

=== MC Brains ===
- 1992: Lovers Lane

=== 702 ===
- 1996: No Doubt

=== Outsiderz 4 Life ===
- 1992: Untitled Album (unreleased) (As Sudden Inpact) (Biv 10 Records/Motown)
- 1997: Untitled Album (unreleased) (As Whytgize) (Stonecreek Records/Capitol)
- 2000: www.outsiderz4life.com (Shelved) (Virgin/Blackground Entertainment)
- 2007: Outsiderz 4 Life (VSD Entertainment)
- 2015: Sudden Impact - WhytGize - Outsiderz Compilation 1 (TAVA Entertainment)

=== The Transitions ===
- 2001: Back in da Days

=== Hayden ===
- 1995: Untitled Album (unreleased)

=== Mag 7 ===
- 1997: The Street

=== East Coast Family ===
- 1992: East Coast Family Volume One

=== Biv 10 Pee Wee All-Stars ===
- 1999: The Adventures Of The Biv 10 Pee Wee All-Stars

== See also ==
- List of record labels
