= 702 (group) =

American girl group

- 702 in a promotional photo from 1999; (from left to right): Orish Grinstead, Meelah Williams, and Irish Grinstead

Background information
- Also known as: Sweeter than Sugar
- Origin: Las Vegas, Nevada, U.S.
- Genres: R&B; hip pop; pop
- Years active: 1993–2006; 2017–present
- Labels: Biv 10; Motown
- Members: LeMisha Grinstead; Meelah Williams
- Past members: Irish Grinstead; Orish Grinstead; Amelia Cruz; Tiffany Villarreal; Cree Lemore

702 (pronounced "seven-oh-two") is an American musical girl group whose most notable line-up consisted of LeMisha Grinstead, Irish Grinstead, and Meelah Williams. The group began their musical career as Sweeter than Sugar, formed in 1993 in Las Vegas. After years of limited success, the original quartet comprising LeMisha Grinstead, Irish Grinstead, Orish Grinstead, and Amelia Cruz were signed in 1995 to Biv 10 Records as 702.

The group first saw mainstream success from featuring on Subway's 1995 single "This Lil' Game We Play", which peaked at number 15 on the Billboard Hot 100. Despite commercial success, the group experienced lineup changes with Orish and Cruz being replaced by Meelah Williams and Tiffany Villarreal, respectively. Following Villarreal's departure, they continued their success with the release of their 1996 single "Get It Together". Spawning from their debut studio album No Doubt (1996), the song peaked within the top ten of the Billboard Hot 100, while the album received gold certification by the Recording Industry Association of America (RIAA). Their self-titled second album (1999) became their best-selling release, and contained the top-five single "Where My Girls At?".

In 2001, Cree Lemore replaced Williams after her departure from the group. This lineup released a single "Pootie Tangin'" before Lemore left and Williams re-joined the group. The group released their final album Star in 2003 and disbanded in 2006. The group reunited at 2017 Soul Train Music Awards. 702 has sold over 4 million records as of 2006.

== History ==
=== 1993–1996: Early beginnings and Sweeter than Sugar ===
LeMisha Grinstead wanted to pursue a music career and with the support of her parents, she began performing in local competitions and churches. After performing in the lobby of Caesars Palace, she attracted the attention of actor/comedian Sinbad. Sinbad approached her parents with an opportunity in music, and they encouraged their twin daughters Irish and Orish to perform alongside their sister LeMisha as a trio. Sinbad entered the group into a music competition in Atlanta under the group name Sweeter than Sugar. Although they finished second in the competition, Michael Bivins agreed to work with the group. They also added singer Amelia Cruz to the lineup. After signing the group to his record label Biv 10 Records, Bivins renamed the group "702", after the area code for Las Vegas.

In November 1994, 702 debuted on Subway's first single "This Lil' Game We Play". The single peaked at number 15 on the Billboard Hot 100 and number 4 on the Hot R&B/Hip-Hop Songs chart. It eventually became certified gold, selling over 500,000 copies in the United States. LeMisha, who sang lead vocals on the song, was the only one to go on tour with Subway in 1995. In 1995, 702 began recording their first album. During the recording of the album, Bivins dismissed Orish Grinstead and Amelia Cruz from the group because of his lack of support in their vocal abilities. They were replaced by classmates Meelah Williams (born Kameelah Williams) and Tiffany Villarreal. Six months after joining the group, Villarreal left the group during the recording of the first album, leaving 702 to continue as a trio.

=== 1996–1998: Rise to fame ===
702 released their first album No Doubt in October 1996, which peaked at number eighty-two on the Billboard 200 and number twenty-four on the Billboard Top R&B/Hip-Hop Albums chart. It managed to sell over half of a million copies in the United States, earning a gold certification by the Recording Industry Association of America (RIAA). The album's singles "Steelo" and "Get It Together" reached the top twenty on the Billboard Hot R&B/Hip-Hop Singles & Tracks chart, and both singles were certified gold by the RIAA. In 1997, 702 became the opening act for New Edition's Home Again Tour. In the same year, No Doubt won a Lady of Soul Award for "Best R&B/Soul Album, Group, Band, or Duo" in 1997. "Get It Together" was nominated for "Best R&B/Soul Single, Solo" and "Best R&B/Soul Song of the Year", while the group was nominated for "Best R&B/Soul or Rap New Artist".

A remix of "Steelo" became the theme song to the Nickelodeon television show Cousin Skeeter in 1998. In the same year, 702 made cameo appearances in the sitcoms Sister, Sister and Moesha. In March 1998, Missy Elliott released a single "Beep Me 911" which featured 702. The song charted in the top twenty on the UK Singles chart.

=== 1999–2002: Breakthrough and lineup changes ===
In early 1999, the group performed the national anthem for the Women's National Basketball Association. In June 1999, they released their self-titled second album, which peaked in the top forty on the Billboard charts and became certified platinum. The album's first single "Where My Girls At?" charted in the top-five on the Billboard Hot 100 and became certified gold. In mid-1999, 702 toured as the opening act of Brandy's Never Say Never World Tour. During the tour, LeMisha went on a two-month maternity leave and later gave birth to her son Tony Fields II on June 18, 1999. During her hiatus, Orish briefly re-joined the group. They also made a cameo in the 1999 ABC-TV movie Double Platinum. 702 also signed a deal with Wilhelmina Models. In 2000, 702 toured as the opening act for Brian McKnight's Back at One Tour.

In 2001, Williams departed from the group and signed a management deal with Todd Russaw's Pedigree MGI Management. During that time, she sang backup and wrote three songs for Faith Evans' album Faithfully. She also sang backup for Missy Elliott's song "Take Away", the third single from her 2001 album Miss E...So Addictive. Cree Lemore replaced Williams in the group. 702 released the single "Pootie Tangin" from the soundtrack of the comedy film Pootie Tang. The single received a Soul Train Lady of Soul nomination for "Best R&B/Soul Single, Group, Band or Duo" in 2002. Shortly after the release of the single, Lemore departed from the group and Williams rejoined the group.

=== 2003–2004: Star, disbandment, and aftermath ===
In March 2003, 702 released their third album Star. The album peaked within the top 50 on the Billboard 200. The lead single "Star" peaked at number ninety-eight on the R&B chart. Their follow-up single "I Still Love You" peaked at number 49 on the R&B chart. Also in 2003, 702 shared lead vocals on the track "Gamble It" from the album Emotions by Sirena. Irish Grinstead appeared in The Brewster Project in 2004.

In 2005, the group officially disbanded to pursue solo careers. Williams continued a career in the music industry as a background vocalist for Faith Evans and Macy Gray. LeMisha began a career as a wedding chapel manager at Treasure Island Hotel and Casino in Las Vegas. Irish also pursued a career in accounting. In 2006, the original lineup of 702 (LeMisha, Irish, and Orish Grinstead) appeared on E Sharp's album E Sharp presents Vol. I. In 2007, LeMisha released a song titled "What I Got" on the E Sharp's second album E Sharp Presents Vol. II. On April 20, 2008, original member Orish Grinstead died from autoimmune hepatitis.

In 2014, Williams joined the season three cast of reality television show R&B Divas: Atlanta to bring awareness to children born with autism.

=== 2017–present: Reunion ===
In November 2017, the group reformed and attended the 2017 Soul Train Music Awards. In 2018, the group appeared in the music documentary program Unsung. Also in 2018, the group began touring together for the first time in fifteen years. In 2019, the group performed a tribute medley to Xscape at the Black Music Honors. In May 2021, Irish and LeMisha Grinstead were among the lineup of cast members for the BET Network reality television show BET Presents: The Encore. On December 15, 2022, it was announced on the group's Instagram page that Irish Grinstead would be taking a medical leave from the group to address serious health concerns. In May 2023, the group performed "Where My Girls At?" in tribute to Missy Elliott at the Black Music Honors. On September 16, 2023, Irish Grinstead died after a long battle with an undisclosed illness.

In 2024, 702 appeared as a special guest on The Queens of R&B Tour.

== Artistry ==
702 recorded R&B songs with styles that encompass rap, soul, contemporary, gospel, and jazz. In the group's original lineup, LeMisha was the lead vocalist, Irish was on alto, Orish and Amelia were on soprano. After the lineup change, LeMisha later alternated as second soprano and alternate lead vocalist in the group's trio lineup as Meelah often sang lead for the majority of their songs. In their first album No Doubt (1996), each member sings lead in the majority of the songs. Williams, however, completely led songs like "Steelo" and "Get It Together". The group explored themes of women's empowerment in songs such as "Where My Girls At?" and "Better Day (Ghetto Girl)".

== Legacy ==
702 have been recognized as one of the most influential female R&B groups of the 1990s. 702's final lineup as a trio has been widely noted as the group's most recognizable and successful lineup, having sold over 4 million records worldwide.

The group's single "Where My Girls At?" (1999) was ranked number 46 on Billboard's list of "100 Greatest Girl Group Songs of All Time", ranked number 72 on their "The 99 Greatest Songs of 1999" list, and was listed on their "Greatest of All Time Top Songs of the 90s" list. The term "Steelo" became popularized by 702's single of the same name as a slang word for "style". The group has also been credited as a musical influence or inspiration to several artists including Solange Knowles, and FLO.

== Members timeline ==
=== Current members ===
- LeMisha Grinstead (1993–2006), (2017–present)
- Meelah Williams (1995–2001), (2002–2005), (2017–present)

=== Former members ===
- Irish Grinstead (1993–2006), (2017–2022; died 2023)
- Orish Grinstead (1993–1995), (1999), (2006; died 2008)
- Amelia Cruz (1993–1995)
- Tiffany Villarreal (1995–1996)
- Cree Lemore (2001)

== Discography ==
Studio albums

- No Doubt (1996)
- 702 (1999)
- Star (2003)

== Awards and nominations ==
American Music Awards

Year	Result	Category
2000	Nominated	Favorite Soul/R&B New Artist; For: "702"

BET Awards

Year	Result	Category
2001	Nominated	Best Female Group; For: "702"

Soul Train Lady of Soul Awards

Year	Result	Category
1997	Won	Best R&B/Soul Album of the Year – Group, Band or Duo; For: "No Doubt"
1999	Nominated	Best R&B/Soul Single – Group, Band or Duo; For: "Where My Girls At?"
2000	Nominated	Best R&B/Soul Album of the Year – Group, Band or Duo; For: "702"
2002	Nominated	Best R&B/Soul Single – Group, Band or Duo; For: "Pootie Tangin"
2003	Nominated	Best R&B/Soul Album of the Year – Group, Band or Duo; For: "Star"
2003	Nominated	Best R&B/Soul Single – Group, Band or Duo; For: "I Still Love You"
