= Keybeats =

American songwriter, producer, multi-instrumentalist duo

Eric Seats & Rapture Stewart
- Also known as: KeyBeats, Key Beats Inc.
- Genres: R&B; soul; hip-hop
- Occupations: Songwriters; producers; multi-instrumentalists
- Years active: 1997–2001

Keybeats, composed of drummer Eric Seats and producer Rapture Stewart, were an American songwriting, production, and instrumentalist duo formed in 1997, moving from California to New York to work with Timbaland's production outfit (in collaboration with Blackground Records) in the late 1990s. The duo is best known for co-writing and producing group 702's hit single "Where My Girls At?", as well as Aaliyah's "Rock the Boat", resulting in eight written and produced tracks on her eponymous 2001 album. Keybeats has also worked with Destiny's Child, Tank, and 702, and placed records onto several movie soundtracks. Their contributions to "Rock The Boat" were utilized on Kanye West's "Fade" and The Weeknd's "What You Need" from his early House of Balloons project. It was reported on a now-defunct Prince website that he was also inspired by their Aaliyah productions (namely "Rock The Boat") to record minor R&B hit "1000's of X's & O's" off of 2015 album Hit n Run Phase One.

Seats is currently a member of Stellar Award-winning gospel group The Soul Seekers, signed to GospoCentric / RCA Inspiration.

== Songwriting and production credits ==
Credits are courtesy of Discogs, Tidal, Apple Music, and AllMusic.

| Title | Year | Artist | Album |
|---|---|---|---|
| "Where My Girls At?" (#4 US, #3 R&B, #22 UK, #65 AUS, #21 GER, #83 FR, #5 CAN) | 1999 | 702 | 702 |
| "Gotta Leave" (#58 R&B) | 1999 | 702 | 702 |
| "Bedroom" (Interlude) ‹› | 1999 | Shae Jones | Talk Show |
| "I Want to Stay"‹› | 1999 | Shae Jones | Talk Show |
| "Pump the Brakes" | 2000 | Dave Hollister | Romeo Must Die (soundtrack) |
| "This Is a Test" | 2000 | Chanté Moore | Romeo Must Die (soundtrack) |
| "Perfect Man" | 2000 | Destiny's Child | Romeo Must Die (soundtrack) |
| "Now I Got a Girl" | 2000 | Torrey Carter | The Life I Live (Shelved) |
| "Rock the Boat" (#14 US, #2 R&B, #12 UK, #49 AUS, #70 GER, #63 CAN, #9 NLD) | 2001 | Aaliyah | Aaliyah |
| "Extra Smooth" | 2001 | Aaliyah | Aaliyah |
| "U Got Nerve" | 2001 | Aaliyah | Aaliyah |
| "It's Whatever" | 2001 | Aaliyah | Aaliyah |
| "Those Were the Days" | 2001 | Aaliyah | Aaliyah |
| "Messed Up" | 2001 | Aaliyah | Aaliyah |
| "Erica Kane" | 2001 | Aaliyah | Aaliyah |
| "Independent Women Part II" | 2001 | Destiny's Child | Survivor |
| "Perfect Man" | 2001 | Destiny's Child | Survivor |
| "Can't Get Down" | 2001 | Tank | Force of Nature |
| "Kill 4 You" | 2001 | Tank | Force of Nature |
| "It's on Me" | 2001 | Ideal | Exit Wounds (soundtrack) |
| "Get Krunked" | 2002 | Kimberly Scott | Y'all Ain't Ready |
| "Make Me a Song" (#99 US, #54 R&B) | 2003 | Kiley Dean | Simple Girl (Shelved) |
| "What You Need" | 2011 | The Weeknd | House of Balloons |
| "Fade" (#47 US, #12 R&B, #50 UK, #69 AUS, #37 CAN, #40 FR) | 2016 | Kanye West | The Life of Pablo |
| "Dope" (Featuring Marsha Ambrosius) (#121 US, #46 R&B) | 2017 | T.I. | Non-album single |

‹› Eric Seats Co-writes/Productions

«» Rapture Stewart Co-writes/Productions

== Awards and nominations ==
| Year | Awarding Body | Award | Result | Ref |
|---|---|---|---|---|
| 2000 | ASCAP Rhythm & Soul Awards | Award-Winning R&B/Hip-Hop Songs (Where My Girls At?) | Won | |
| 2001 | ASCAP Pop Awards | Award-Winning Pop Songs (Where My Girls At?) | Won | |
| 2003 | ASCAP Rhythm & Soul Awards | Award-Winning R&B/Hip-Hop Songs (Rock the Boat) | Won | |
