= Gotta Leave =

Single by 702

from the album 702
- Released: February 7, 2000
- Length: 5:08 (album version); 3:45 (radio edit)
- Label: Motown
- Songwriter(s): Melissa Elliott; Eric Seats; Rapture Stewart
- Producer(s): Missy Elliott; Eric Seats; Rapture Stewart

702 singles chronology
"You Don't Know" (1999)	"Gotta Leave" (2000)	"Pootie Tangin" (2001)

"Gotta Leave" is a song by American R&B group 702. It was written and produced by Missy Elliott, Eric Seats, and Rapture Stewart and recorded for the group's self-titled second album (1999). "Gotta Leave", an R&B groove containing electronic sounds, was released as the album's third and final single. The second Elliott-produced single to be lifed from the album after "Where My Girls At?," it peaked at number 58 on the US Hot R&B/Hip-Hop Songs chart.

== Background ==
"Gotta Leave" was written and produced by Missy Elliott, Eric Seats, and Rapture Stewart and recorded for the group's self-titled second album (1999). After the song was selected as the album's third single, it was reported that 702 had gone back in the studio with Elliott to record a remix version of the song which would serve as the single version for the song.

== Music video ==
The music video for "Gotta Leave" was shot in Los Angeles California in February 2000 and it was directed by Darren Grant. The video premiered on BET the week ending March 19, 2000. The concept of the video is about the girls of 702 being fed up with the lying, cheating men in their lives. The video begins with the girls in a house doing various activities while wearing all black outfits. Irish is looking for items in the closet, Meelah is in the bathroom combing her hair in the mirror and Lemisha is shown walking towards the garage. The next scene show the girls wearing white outfits singing. The next various scenes show the girls sitting around the table talking and playing Dominoes and individually lounging around the house alone. Dressed in all black the women eventually leave the house and drive off. After a while the women are shown singing as they are driving in the middle of nowhere until they reach their destination. Once they reach their destination they get out of the car and open up the trunk of the car. After they open up the trunk it is revealed that they have kidnapped a guy who is possibly dating one of the girls. As they are singing the chorus of the song the women taunt the frightened man. They close the trunk of the car and drive off and the final scene of the video reverts to the previous scene showing the girls sitting around the table playing dominoes.

== Track listings ==
All tracks written and produced by Melissa Elliott, Eric Seats and Rapture Stewart.

CD single
No.	Title	Length
1.	"Gotta Leave" (LP Radio Edit)	3:45
2.	"Gotta Leave" (Remix Radio Edit)	3:45

== Credits and personnel ==
Credits lifted from the liner notes of 702.

- Melissa Elliott – producer, writer
- Paul Falcone – engineer
- Jonas Grabarnick – engineering assistant
- Irish Grinstead – vocalist
- Misha Grinstead – vocalist
- Dante Nolen – bass
- Eric Seats – instruments, producer, writer
- Rapture Stewart – instruments, producer, writer
- Meelah Williams – vocalist

== Charts ==
Weekly chart performance for "Gotta Leave"
Chart (1999–2000)	Peak position
US Hot R&B/Hip-Hop Songs (Billboard)	58
US Rhythmic (Billboard)	35
