= The MDNA Tour =

2012 concert tour by Madonna

- World tour by Madonna
- Promotional poster for the tour
- Location: Asia; Europe; North America; South America
- Associated album: MDNA
- Start date: May 31, 2012
- End date: December 22, 2012
- Legs: 4
- No. of shows: 88
- Attendance: 2.2 million
- Box office: US$305.2 million (Note: US$428.01 million in 2025 dollars.)

Madonna concert chronology
- Sticky & Sweet Tour (2008–2009); The MDNA Tour (2012); Rebel Heart Tour (2015–2016)

The MDNA Tour was the ninth concert tour by American singer Madonna, launched in support of her twelfth studio album, MDNA (2012). It was her fifth major collaboration with Live Nation and comprised 88 shows across Eurasia and the Americas. Following early rumors in 2011, the tour was officially announced after Madonna's performance at the Super Bowl XLVI halftime show in February 2012. The tour began on May 31, 2012, at Ramat Gan Stadium in Tel Aviv, and concluded on December 22 at Estadio Mario Alberto Kempes in Córdoba, Argentina. It marked her first performances in Scotland, Ukraine, Colombia, and the United Arab Emirates, as well as her first show in Turkey since the Girlie Show (1993). An Australian leg was planned for early 2013 but ultimately cancelled.

The show was divided into four thematic segments —Transgression, Prophecy, Masculine/Feminine, and Redemption— and described by Madonna as "the journey of a soul from darkness to light". Designed with contributions from Arianne Phillips and Jean Paul Gaultier, the production received generally positive reviews, with praise directed at its visual staging and choreography. However, critics noted the relative absence of Madonna's earlier hits in favor of MDNA material. The tour sparked several controversies, including the use of firearms and violent imagery, partial nudity, and political statements. A video interlude comparing French politician Marine Le Pen to Adolf Hitler led to a legal threat, while her support for Pussy Riot and LGBTQ+ rights during shows in Russia drew criticism from conservative groups. Additionally, an intimate concert at Paris's Olympia was widely panned by fans for its short length.

Commercially, MDNA was a major success. It grossed $305.2 million ($428.01 million in 2025 dollars) from 88 sold-out shows, becoming the highest-grossing tour of 2012 and, at the time, the tenth highest-grossing tour ever. Madonna received the Top Touring Artist award at the 2013 Billboard Music Awards. The concerts at Miami's American Airlines Arena were filmed and broadcast as Madonna: The MDNA Tour through EPIX. A live album and concert film titled MDNA World Tour was released on September 10, 2013, in multiple formats, including double CD, DVD, and Blu-ray.

== Background ==
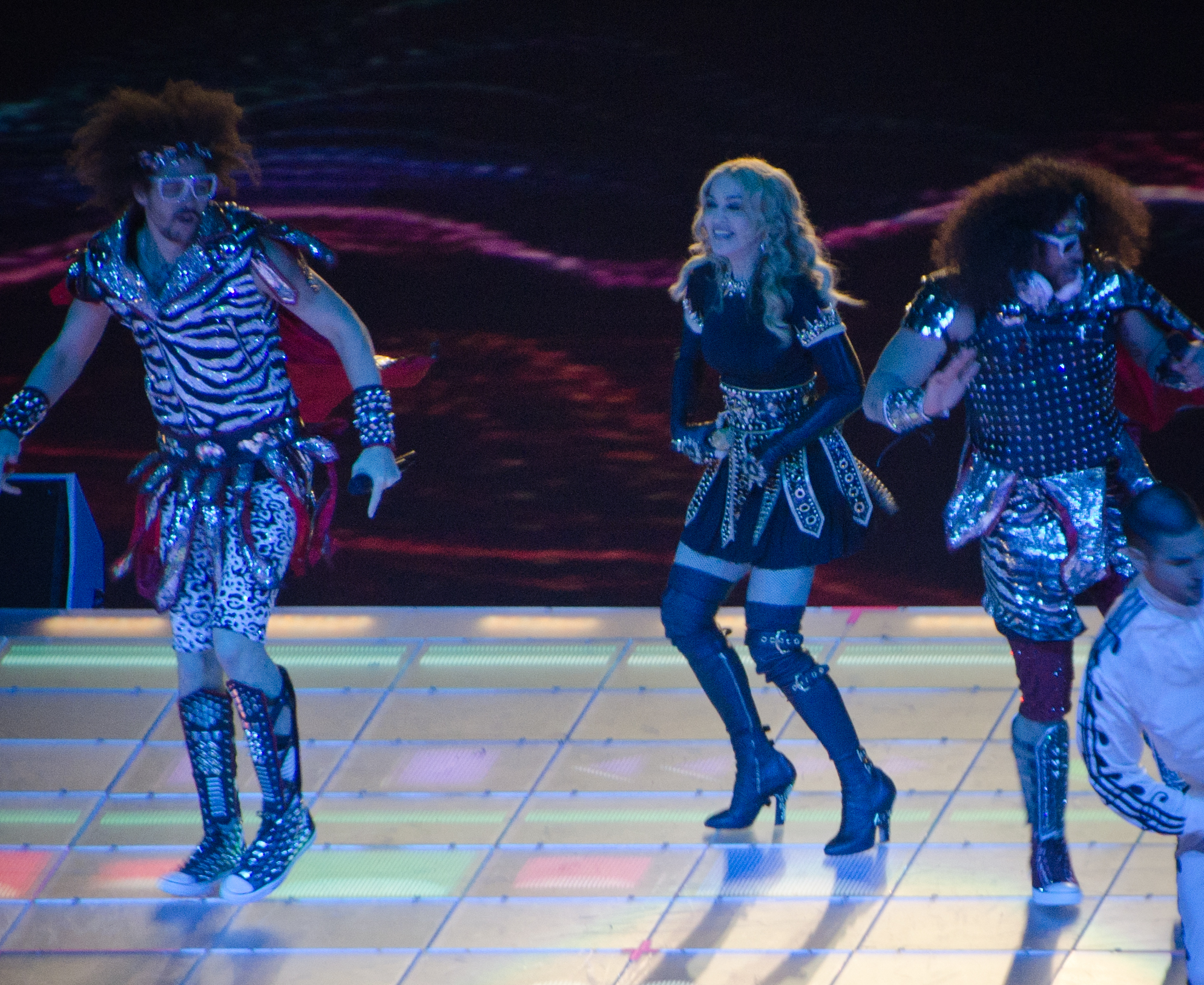
Madonna and LMFAO performing during the Super Bowl XLVI halftime show, months before the MDNA Tour began.

In early 2011, MTV News reported that Madonna would tour with the cast of American television series Glee, but her team denied the claim. Later that year, fansite DrownedMadonna published a purported 2012 tour itinerary from Live Nation listing stops in Auckland, Singapore, Thailand, The Philippines, China, South Korea, Japan, Abu Dhabi and Tel Aviv; this too was confirmed false by her publicist Liz Rosenberg. However, Madonna did partner with Smirnoff to launch the "Nightlife Exchange Project", a global dance contest judged by her, her choreographers, and manager Guy Oseary. The winner, Charles "Lil Buck" Riley, was selected at the final event in New York and invited to join her next tour.

On February 5, 2012, Madonna performed at the Super Bowl XLVI halftime show at Lucas Oil Stadium in Indianapolis. The following day, she officially announced the 2012 World Tour, later titled the MDNA Tour. Live Nation executive Arthur Fogel described it as her most extensive tour to date, covering 26 European cities before expanding to North and South America, with an anticipated stop in Australia —her first since the Girlie Show in 1993. Venues included stadiums, arenas, and "unique outdoor sites" such as Québec City's Plains of Abraham. Madonna's twelfth studio album, MDNA, was released on March 26, and fans who purchased tickets in the US received a free digital or physical copy. Up to 250,000 copies of the album were reportedly distributed this way.

In July, the Australian leg was officially cancelled, with a spokesperson stating the tour would end in South America as planned. The announcement prompted backlash from Australian fans, who expressed their disappointment online. In response, Madonna posted an audio message on YouTube apologizing for the cancellation and explaining that her children were her top priority. She promised that when she eventually toured Australia, it would be worth the wait, adding, "I will put on the greatest show on Earth. I haven't forgotten about you".

== Development ==
=== Conception and rehearsals ===
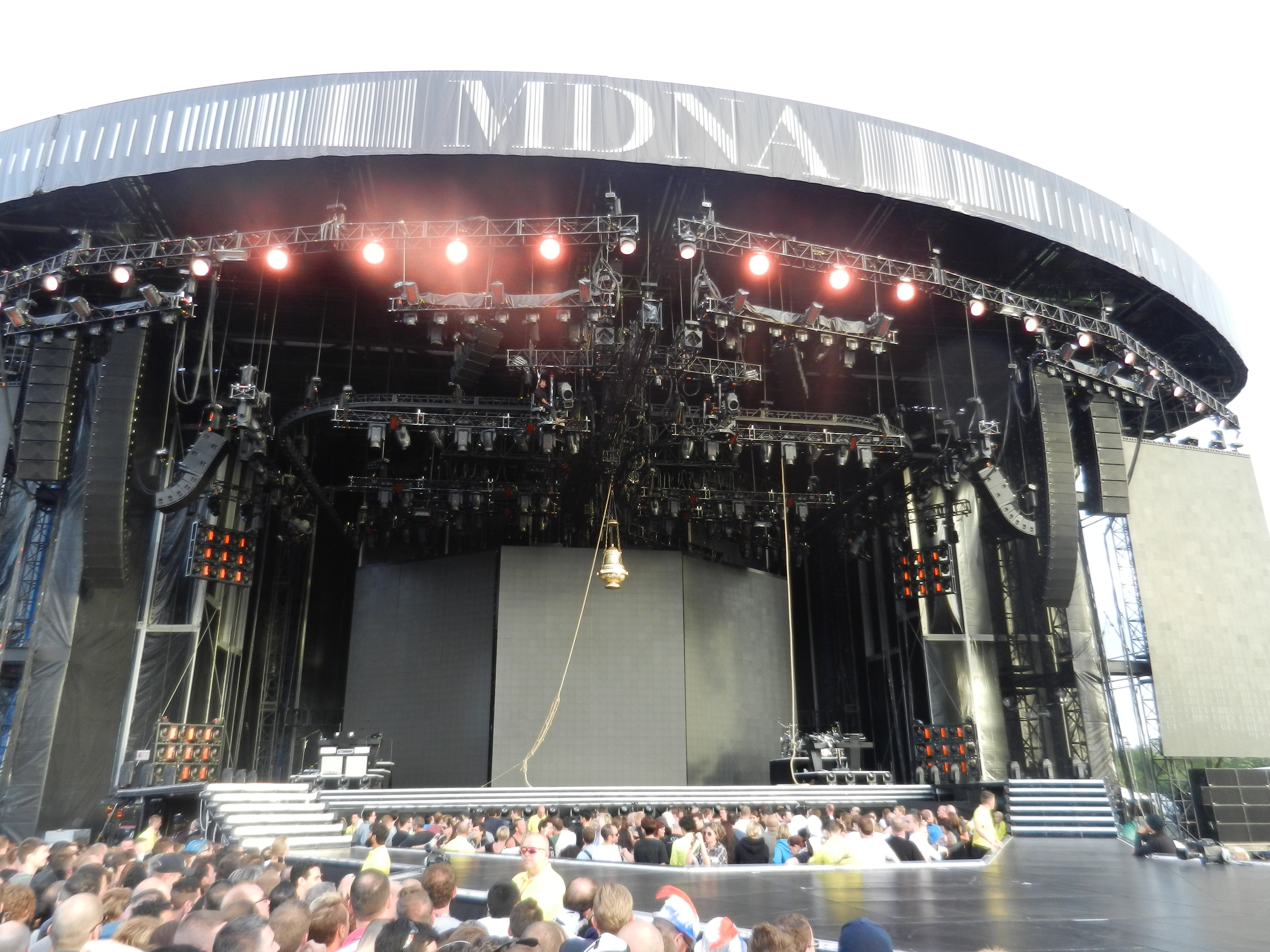
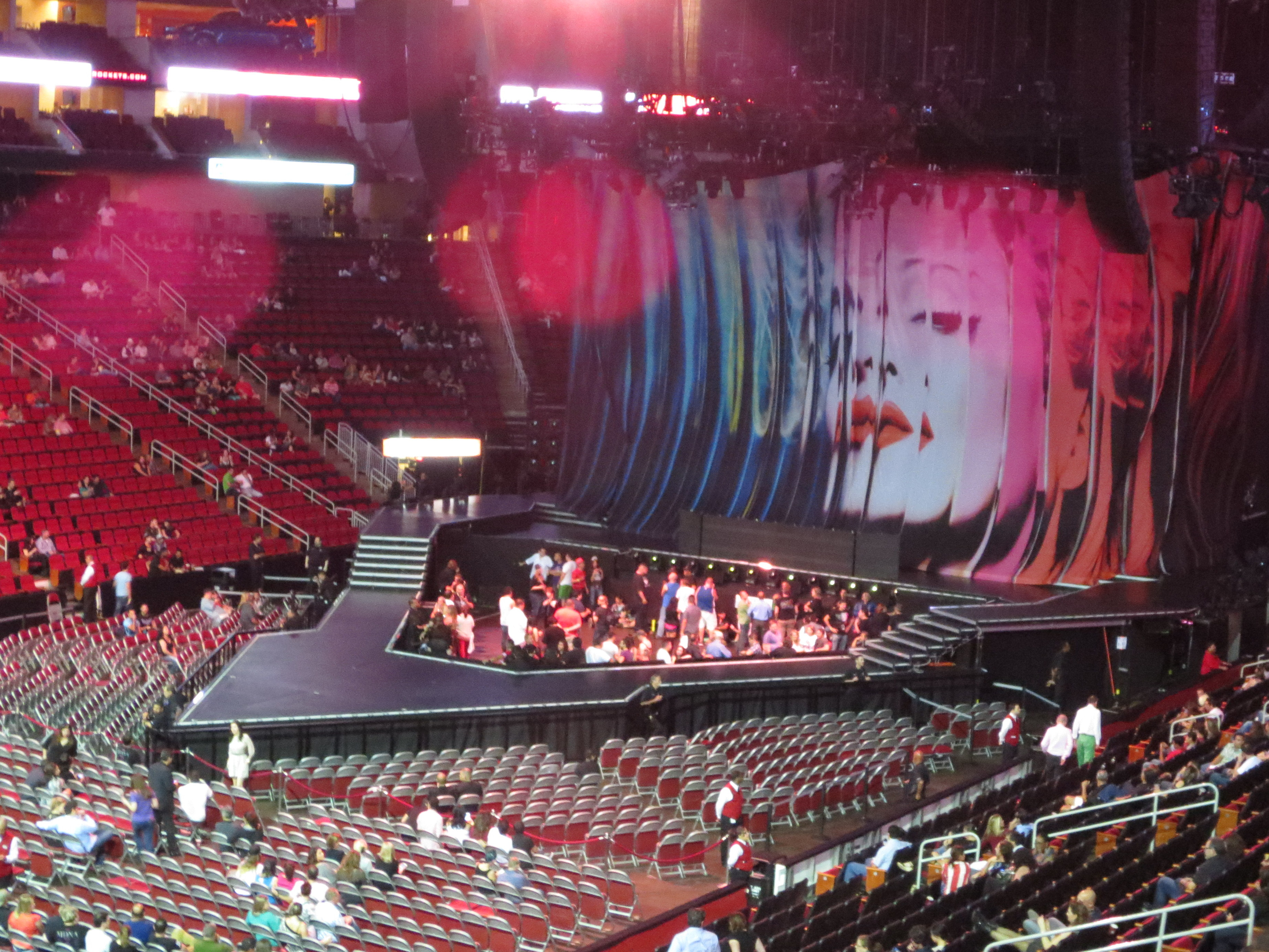
Views of the stage in both an outdoor (top) and indoor (bottom) venue, showing the inflatable roof, backdrop screens, catwalk and pit enclosing the audience.

The MDNA Tour marked Madonna's fifth collaboration with Live Nation and began taking shape in mid-2010, following early discussions between architect Mark Fisher, manager Guy Oseary, and promoter Arthur Fogel. Production veteran Jake Berry, known for his work on U2's 360° Tour (2009–2011), soon joined the team, and the tour's financial and logistical framework was finalized by the end of the year. Fogel described Madonna's tours as "cultural touch points" and "unique animals" in their ability to generate both fan excitement and global media attention. In a Facebook chat with Jimmy Fallon, Madonna revealed that the tour would not replicate her Super Bowl performance and would instead serve as "the journey of a soul from darkness to light", blending cinematic theater, spectacle, and intimate performance art. She confirmed the inclusion of violent imagery and outlined four thematic acts: Transgression, Prophecy, Masculine/Feminine, and Redemption.

Rehearsals began in a converted warehouse in Manhattan, later moving to the Nassau Veterans Memorial Coliseum in Uniondale for full production run-throughs. Madonna described the process as "brutal" and shared images of bruises sustained during rehearsals. Final rehearsals were held at Ramat Gan Stadium in Tel Aviv District, where the tour officially launched on May 31, 2012. The performance ensemble included creative director Jamie King, longtime guitarist Monte Pittman, backing vocalists Kiley Dean and Nicki Richards, and over 15 dancers, including Smirnoff competition winner Lil Buck. Madonna also hired Basque trio Kalakan, whom she discovered in Guéthary, to perform a reworked version of "Open Your Heart" (1986). Slackliner Andy Lewis was invited to join the tour but declined.

During rehearsals, footage of performances such as "Celebration" (2009) and a mashup of "Express Yourself" (1989) and Lady Gaga's "Born This Way" (2011) surfaced online, sparking media interest. Numerous fake set lists circulated before MTV revealed the official lineup on May 14. The tour concluded on December 22, 2012, in Córdoba, Argentina. Madonna explained her decision to begin in Israel as symbolic, stating: "The Middle East and all the conflicts that have been occurring here for thousands of years—they have to stop".

=== Stage and costume design ===
Stageco developed, manufactured and supplied the stage for the MDNA Tour. Shaped like a triangle, the stage included a catwalk that wrapped around a VIP area and extended over the audience, descending from 8 feet (2.4 m) to 5 feet (1.5 m) in height. Multiple lifts allowed for dynamic entrances and prop reveals, while overhead tracks enabled the movement of performers and scenery. The stage stood six stories tall to ensure visibility for distant audience members. For outdoor shows, a custom inflatable roof —covering over 1,100 m² and consisting of 11 air-filled cushions— was provided by Buitink Technology in collaboration with European Future Structures NV, offering protection from weather and simplifying installation.

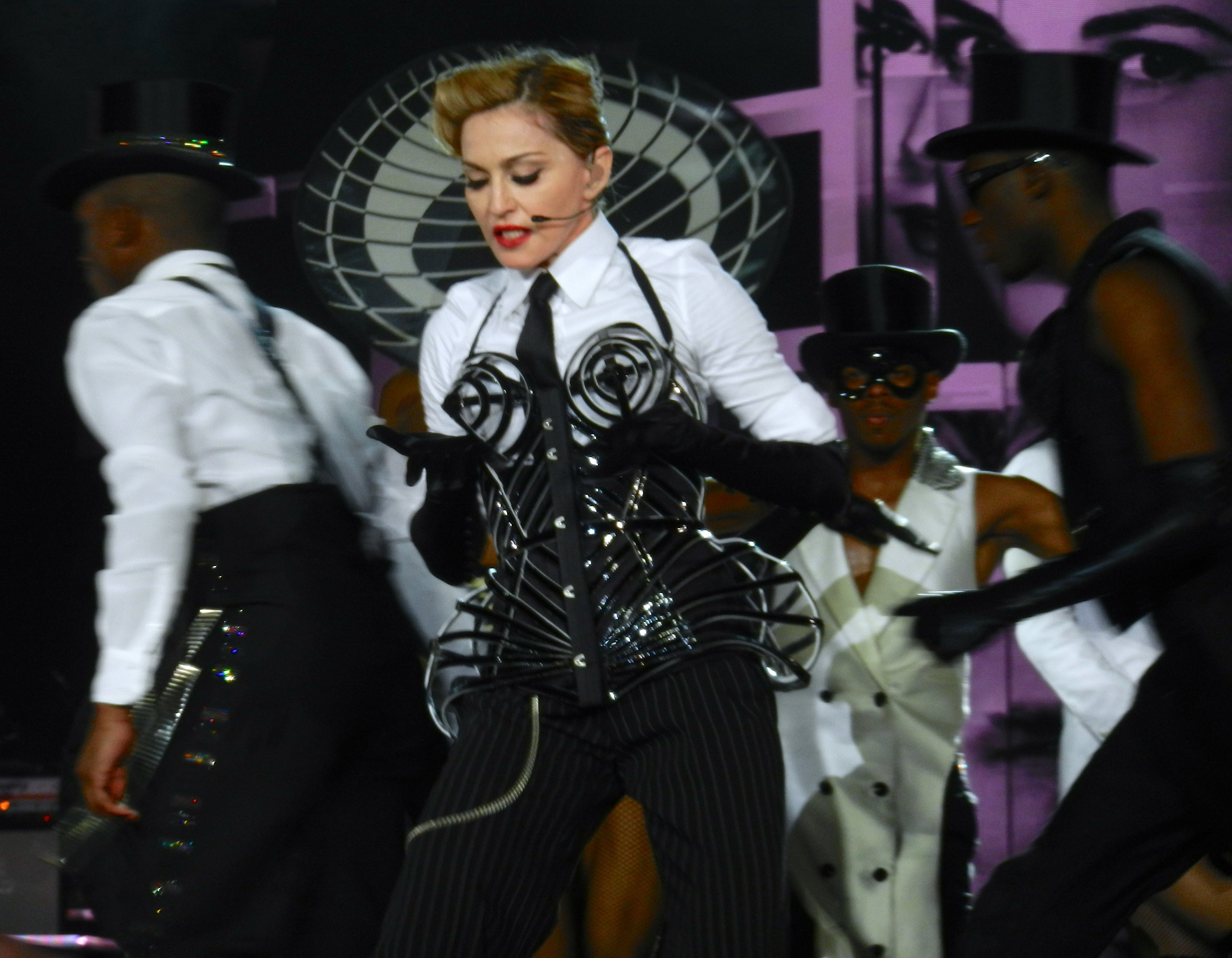
For "Vogue", Madonna donned a re-worked version of the Jean Paul Gaultier-designed conical corset.

A standout element was the massive video backdrop composed of eight tracking and rotating screens, considered the largest ever built for a concert at the time. An additional feature was the LED floor system created by Tait Tower, placed at the center of the stage. It consisted of 36 cube-shaped lifts clad in LED video. Each cube measured 1 by 1 metre (3.3 ft × 3.3 ft), could rise at a speed of 67 centimetres (26 in) per second, and reached a maximum height of 4.78 metres (15.7 ft). When fully retracted, the cubes aligned flush with the floor, creating a seamless performance surface. Props used throughout the show included a giant confessional, fake firearms, a motel set, chandeliers, kinetic mirrors, a swinging thurible, and a layered riser for guest musicians Kalakan. Transporting the tour required four planes.

Costume design was led by Arianne Phillips, with contributions from Jean Paul Gaultier, Jeremy Scott, Alexander Wang, and others. For the performance of "Vogue" (1990), Gaultier created a look that included a white shirt, black tie, opera-length gloves, and a rigid, cone-shaped corset —referencing his original design from 1990's Blond Ambition World Tour but reinterpreted in 3D, using patent leather on the exterior and metallic leather inside. Phillips also designed a Joan of Arc–inspired outfit made of metal mesh and Swarovski crystals, and a 1940s-style majorette uniform. Dolce & Gabbana designed outfits for the band and backup vocalists, while Prada, Miu Miu, and Madonna's Truth or Dare brand provided over 700 pairs of shoes. Additional wardrobe pieces featured lingerie, harnesses, bandolier vests, ram’s head masks, and custom jeans. Madonna made eight costume changes throughout the show.

=== Multimedia and video ===
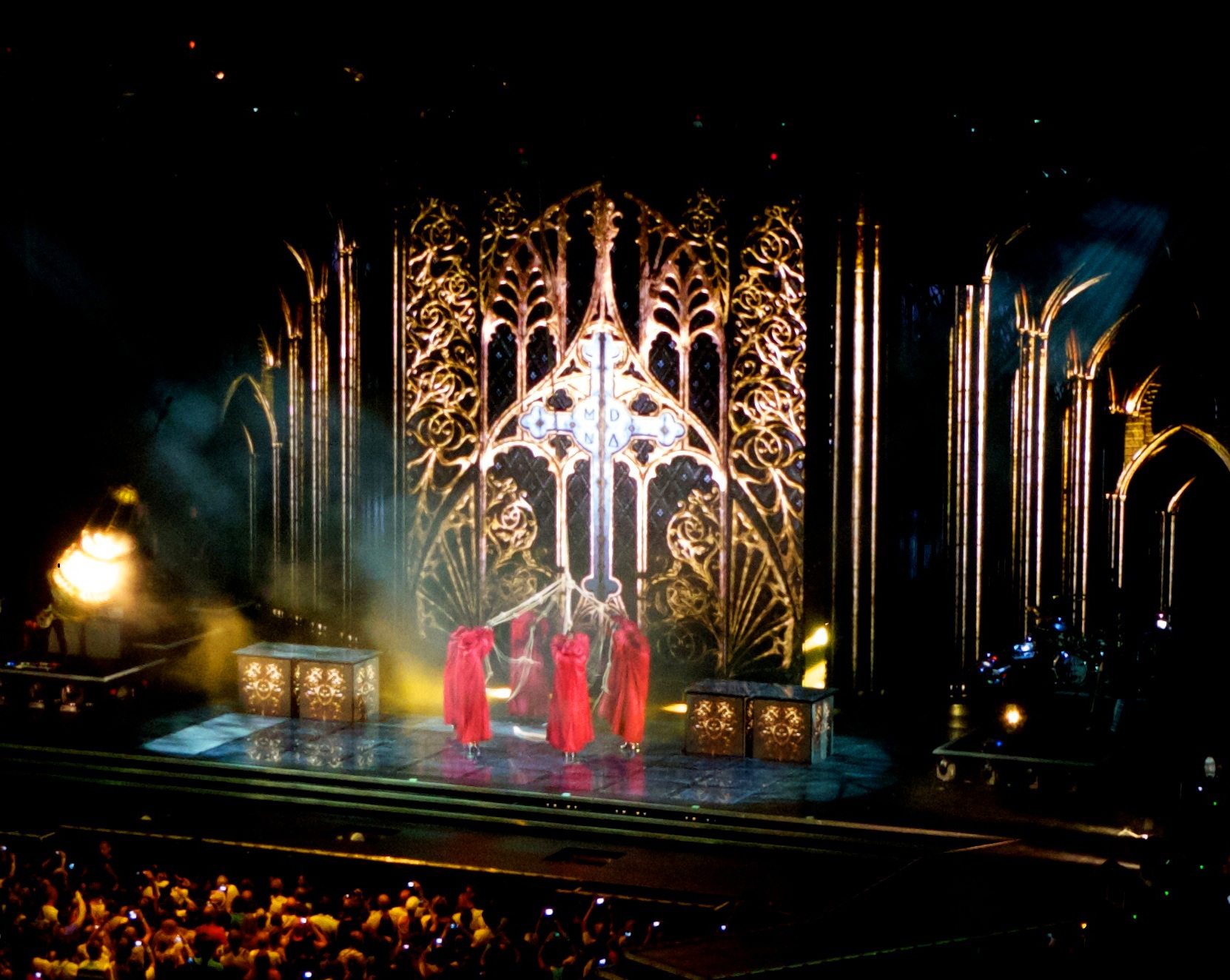
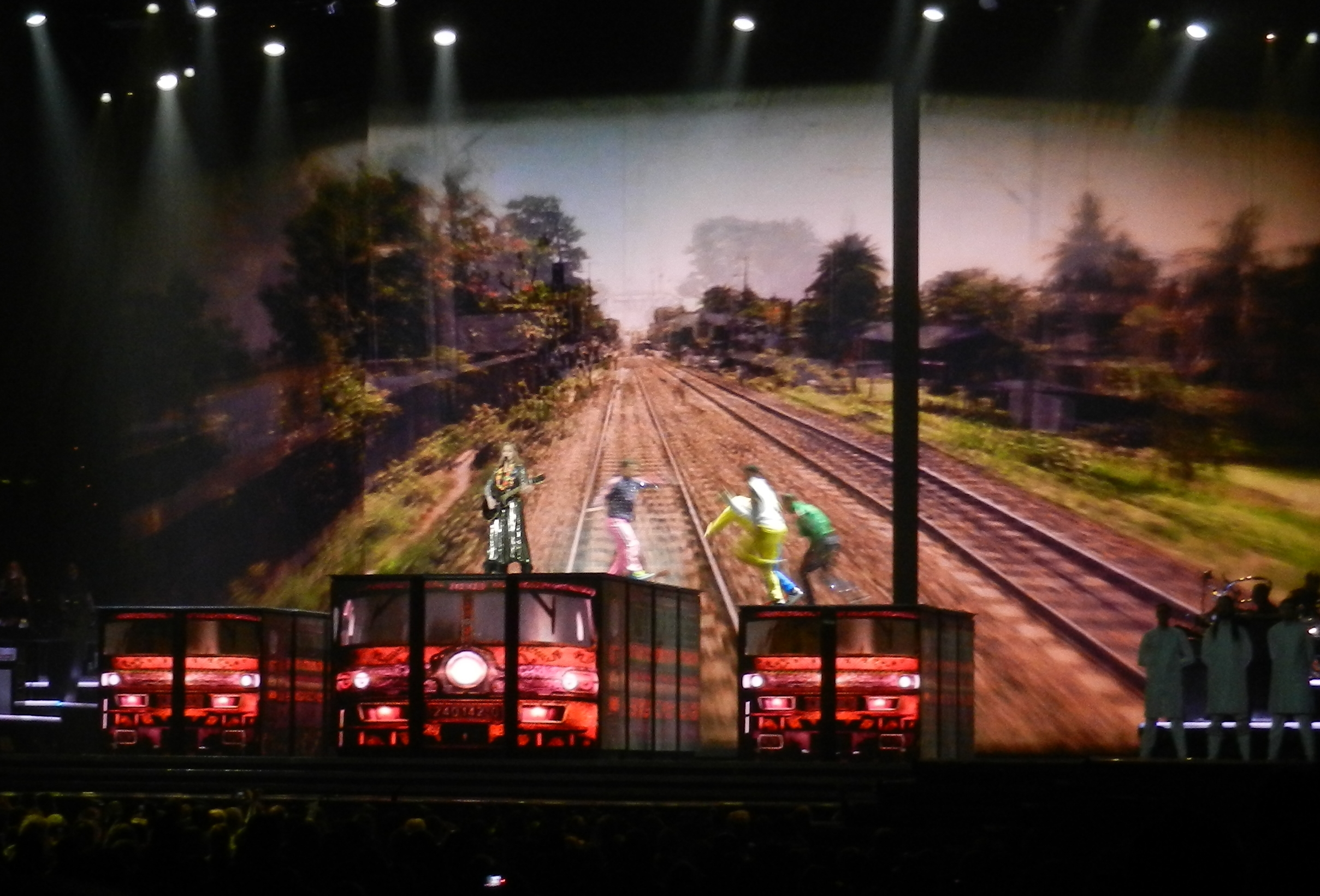
The opening video depicted a "realistic" gothic cathedral (left), while "I'm a Sinner" (right) had Madonna standing on the cube-shaped lifts and the backdrops screens showing a train traveling through India.

Madonna enlisted Canadian multimedia company Moment Factory to design the tour's visual content, marking their second collaboration following the Super Bowl XLVI halftime show. The team had four months to conceptualize and produce multimedia for 12 songs, including "Papa Don't Preach" (1986), "Express Yourself", "Vogue", "I'm a Sinner", "Like a Prayer" (1989), and "Celebration". The process involved full 2D and 3D animation, with video shoots conducted in India, New York, and Montreal. According to Moment Factory content creator Johanna Marsal, ideas were developed collaboratively with show director Michael Laprise, video director Stefaan Desmedt, and choreographers Rich + Tone. Concepts were shaped by stage costumes and audience perspective, and had to be approved by Madonna. Marsal noted that the team had creative freedom and worked closely with lighting and set designers to ensure cohesion.

The visuals ranged from photorealistic to surreal. "Girl Gone Wild" opened in a digitally rendered cathedral, while "Gang Bang" featured blood-splatter effects filmed over three days in Montreal. For "I'm a Sinner", Moment Factory captured psychedelic footage from the back of a moving train in India. The finale, "Celebration", was described as a riot of color and movement. Other collaborators included Tom Munro and Johan Söderberg, who created a video for "Nobody Knows Me" (2003) that morphed Madonna's face with global figures like Sarah Palin, Hu Jintao, and Pope Benedict XVI, exploring themes of intolerance and judgment. Munro also directed a noir-inspired video of Madonna being stalked by masked clowns for "Justify My Love" (1990). The mashup of "Express Yourself" and "Born This Way" incorporated Roy Lichtenstein-style visuals and animated "monsters" devouring imagery from Madonna's past tours, and a lightning bolt referencing David Bowie's Aladdin Sane persona. Slant Magazine's Sal Cinquemani described the sequence as a deliberate jab at Gaga, given the use of "monsters" —a term Gaga uses for her fanbase. During the performance of "Vogue", the logo of magazine of the same name was prominently displayed onscreen. Additional video cameos featured Lil Wayne, Nicki Minaj, and M.I.A. on "Revolver", "I Don't Give A", and "Give Me All Your Luvin'", respectively.

One of the most complex technical challenges was mapping visuals onto the moving cube lifts at the center of the stage. According to Desmedt, a custom-configured DR controller developed by UVA was used to achieve the precise projections. He noted that working on Madonna’s show differed from typical concerts due to its highly theatrical nature: "Whereas usually you'd be cutting to the music, here you're cutting to very tiny details. It's less flexible".

== Concert synopsis ==
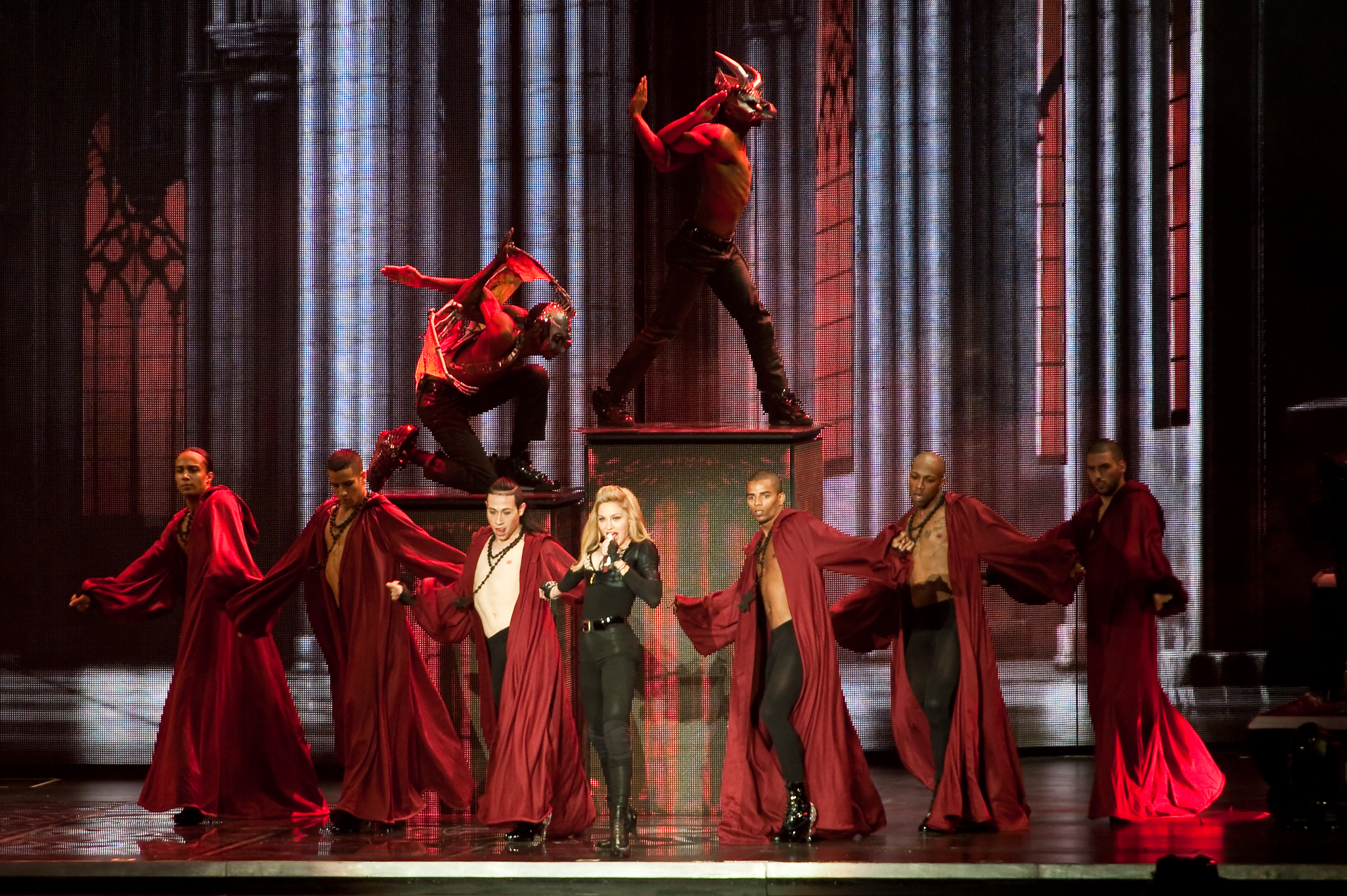
Madonna and her dancers opening the concert with "Girl Gone Wild"

The concert opened with Gregorian chants by Kalakan, pushing a thurible across the stage in a gothic cathedral setting. As the chants shifted to Madonna's name, the backdrop split open to reveal a confessional booth with the singer inside. She appeared to smash through its window with a rifle as "Girl Gone Wild" began, joined by shirtless dancers in high heels. "Revolver" followed, featuring automatic rifles and visuals of Lil Wayne. For "Gang Bang", Madonna performed inside a rotating motel room, firing shots at dancers suspended above as blood splattered across the screens. A shortened "Papa Don't Preach" was sung at the tip of the triangle-shaped stage. In "Hung Up", dancers in army pants and animal masks tied her up, while she slacklined as others slid beneath her. The act ended with "I Don't Give A", performed on electric guitar with Nicki Minaj onscreen seated on a throne. A graveyard-themed video interlude followed, combining MDNA track "Best Friend" and "Heartbeat" from Hard Candy (2008), with contortionists in gas masks.

The Prophecy segment began with a majorette-themed "Express Yourself", complete with baton twirling. Midway through, Madonna incorporated Lady Gaga's "Born This Way" and her own "She’s Not Me". "Give Me All Your Luvin'" followed, featuring a mid-air drumline and screen cameos by Minaj and M.I.A. The "Turning Up the Hits" video interlude played excerpts of "Holiday" (1983), "Into the Groove" (1985), "Lucky Star" (1983), "Like a Virgin" (1984), "4 Minutes" (2008), "Ray of Light" (1998) and "Music", segueing into "Turn Up the Radio", with Madonna in a leather dress playing guitar. A reworked "Open Your Heart" was performed with Kalakan, blending into their Basque song "Sagarra Jo!", while "Masterpiece" closed the act with scenes from W.E. projected on the screens.

A black-and-white interlude of "Justify My Love" opened the Masculine/Feminine act, showing Madonna pursued by masked dancers through a hotel corridor. She returned to the stage in the reimagined Gaultier conical corset for "Vogue", with dancers in monochrome avant-garde outfits. The corset was removed for a mashup of "Candy Shop" and "Erotica", performed in a French cabaret setting. In "Human Nature", she disrobed while mirrors floated around the stage. The act ended with a slow, piano-backed "Like a Virgin", performed with a shirtless dancer who laced her into a corset as "Evgeni's Waltz" from W.E. played.

The Redemption segment began with the "Nobody Knows Me" interlude, which morphed Madonna's face with controversial world figures. A Shaolin-themed "I'm Addicted" followed, featuring martial-arts–inspired visuals and Madonna in the Joan of Arc–inspired Phillips outfit. In "I'm a Sinner", she wore a lei and played guitar as video footage showed a train journey through India, incorporating elements of the unreleased 2000 song "Cyber-Raga". The show concluded with "Like a Prayer", performed with choir-like dancers in robes against religious iconography, and "Celebration", a high-energy closer with neon 3D cubes, laser lights, and dancers mimicking DJs while wearing Beats by Dre headphones.

== Critical reception ==
=== Asia and Europe ===
The opening night drew strong reactions from critics. Niv Elis of The Jerusalem Post called it an "assault on the senses", while The National's Saeed Saeed praised it as "visually dazzling" though he noted it was "at times brutally dark and suffocating, as much an emotional exorcism as a performance". His colleague Marie Louise-Olson commended the singer's energy and physical condition, while Peter E. Müller of Berliner Morgenpost described the show as an "elaborate stage spectacle of enigmatic force", declaring Madonna "still magical and unmatched". WDR 2's Ingo Schmidt praised the provocative nature of the concert, Neil McCormick of The Daily Telegraph deemed it "sensationalist and schizophrenic", and the Birmingham Mail's Kat Keogh applauded its theatricality. El País's Luis Hidalgo found it "danceable and spectacular", showcasing Madonna's "intelligence, femininity, and elegance". Beverley Lyons from the Daily Record called it a "remarkable" concert that revealed "a softer side" of the singer and proved she was "still in Vogue with fans".

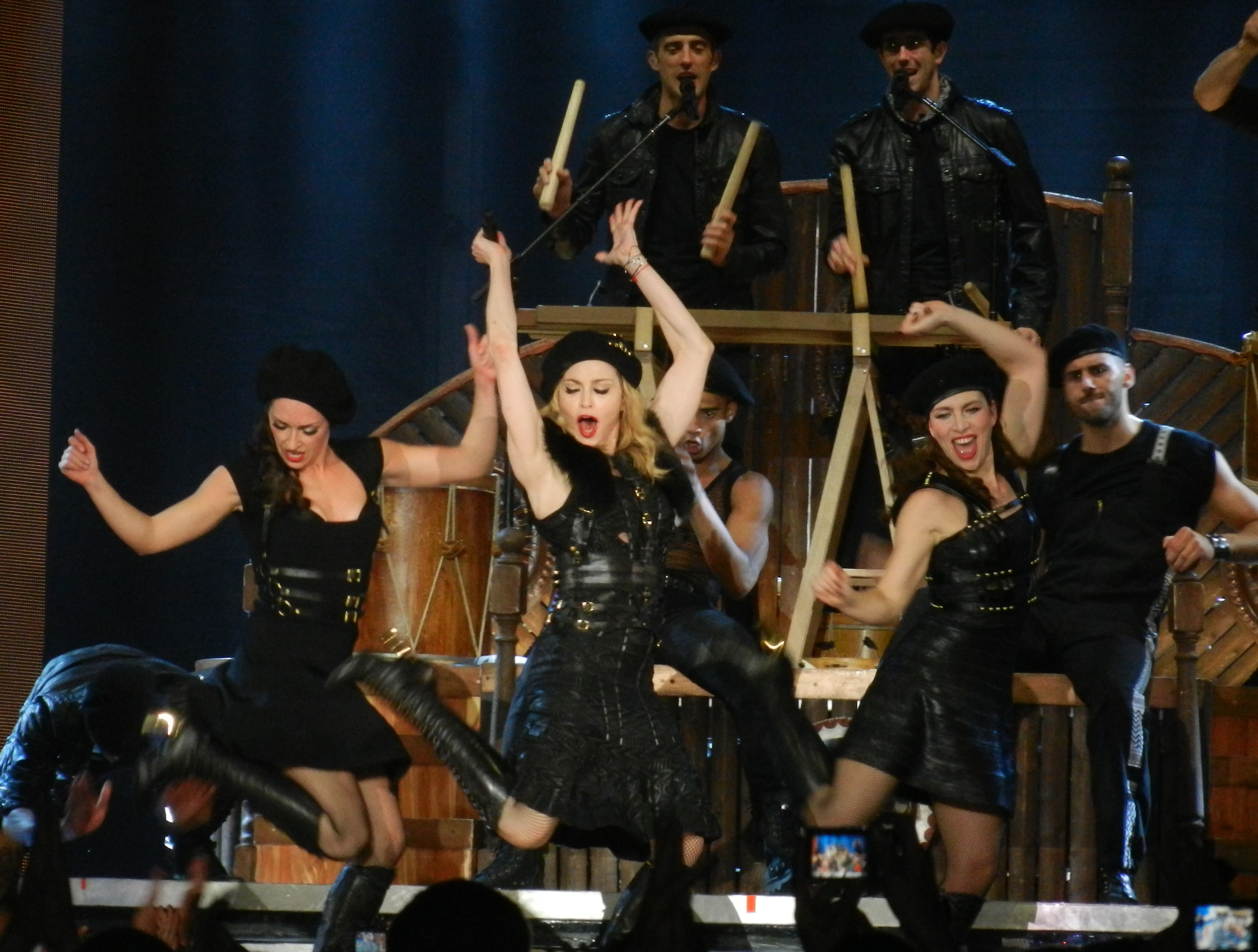
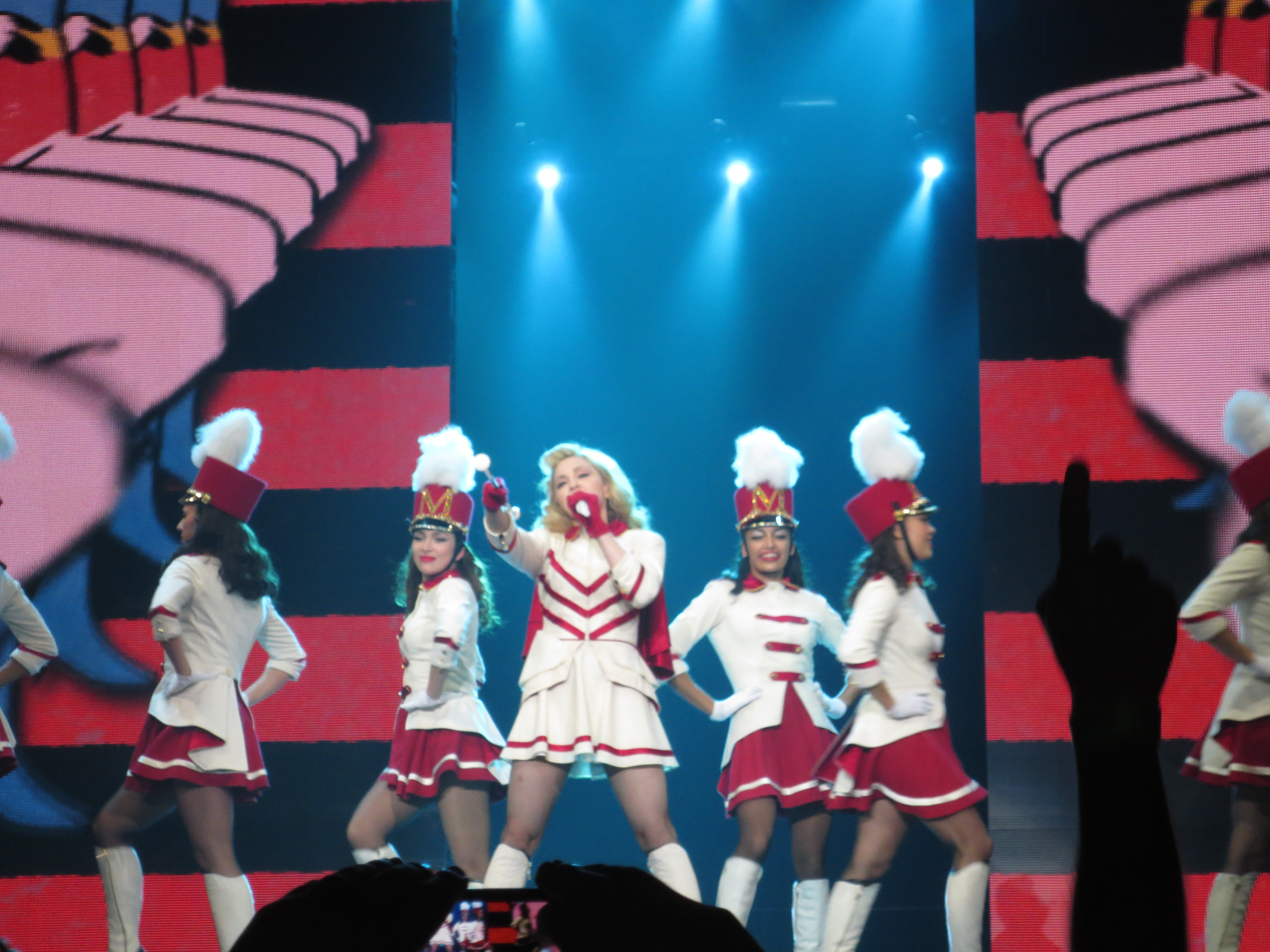
Performances such as "Open Your Heart" (left) and "Express Yourself" (right) were singled out for praise by critics.

Several critics highlighted standout numbers: Schmidt praised the finale pairing of "Like a Prayer" and "Celebration", while The Scotsman's Gary Flockhart cited "Express Yourself" for lightening the mood after the opening act, along with "Open Your Heart", "Vogue", and "Like a Prayer". Hidalgo also praised "Open Your Heart", which featured the Kalakan trio, along with "Masterpiece". Elis described the mashup of "Candy Shop" and "Erotica" as a visual highlight, and surprisingly praised "Give Me All Your Luvin'", despite calling it a "lukewarm single". Opinions on "Like a Virgin" were split —Schmidt found it nearly unrecognizable, while McCormick called it the show's true highlight.

Not all feedback was positive. Blick noted the concert was "rehearsed down to the last detail with little spontaneity". The Evening Standard's John Aizlewood criticized Madonna's reluctance to embrace her back catalog, writing that she dipped into it "occasionally and begrudgingly". Vogue Italia's Giulia Blasi cited poor sound and "suspiciously pristine vocals" during choreography-heavy numbers. For The Independent's Simon Price, the show "goes off with a whimper, not a bang". While Natalie Shaw from The Arts Desk argued the tour "sapped the joy" from Madonna's biggest hits, musicOMH's Michael Hubbard criticized the heavily processed vocals and lack of momentum, calling the show "a gig that lacked oomph throughout". Scholars Imelda Whelehan and Joel Gwynne later noted that the MDNA Tour attracted unusually extensive global coverage, including in British press for shows staged elsewhere.

=== America ===
Rolling Stone's Colleen Nika called the show "ambitious" and praised Madonna's ability to deliver provocative pop better than anyone. Jon Pareles of The New York Times described it as a "display of energy and nutty inventiveness", while Newday' Glenn Gamboa saw it as one of her most revealing reinventions. The Seattle Times critics Sharon Pian Chan and Andrew Matson commended its spectacle and choreography, and Le Journal de Montréal's Marc-André Lemieux praised its emotional range. Others, like Creative Loafing's Mark Segal Kemp, described the tour as more of a theatrical experience than a traditional concert, while the San Francisco Chronicle's Aidin Vaziri called it "masterfully produced". In Colombia, local press hailed her Medellín shows as "historic" and "unprecedented".

Las Vegas Review-Journal's Jason Bracelin emphasized the show’s emotional tone and Madonna's ability to reinvent older hits. The incorporation of "Born This Way" during "Express Yourself" was seen by The New York Times as a standout moment of artistic rivalry. Critics were divided on the set list: some, like Ross Raihala of the St. Paul Pioneer Press and Vaziri, felt the MDNA cuts were weak and the arrangements of older songs inconsistent. Others, including Segal Kemp and Lemieux, defended the non-hit material as bold and innovative, highlighting performances like "I Don't Give A" and "Turn Up the Radio". The renditions of "Express Yourself", "Open Your Heart", "Vogue", and "Like a Virgin" were singled out for their style and energy by several critics, including the Sun-Sentinel's Ben Crandell.

Despite the praise, the show also received criticism. Sal Cinquemani called the Masculine/Feminine segment the creative peak but criticized truncated numbers like "Papa Don't Preach" and "Hung Up". Spin's Carolyn Ganz considered MDNA to be Madonna's "least coherent" concert since 2001's Drowned World Tour, while Vaziri and Bracelin felt the spectacle sometimes overwhelmed the substance. The Mercury News' Jim Harrington gave a notably negative review; "the set list was weak. The new songs were forgettable. The old favorites were dressed up in different arrangements, most of which were awful. And the theatrics — such a big part of a Madonna concert — ranged from dreadful to dull". In retrospect, The Advocate and VH1 both ranked MDNA as Madonna's seventh-best tour, with Christopher Rosa noting that after the initial shock faded, it proved a "very solid concert". In 2024, Cinquemani, writing for Billboard, upgraded its standing, naming it her fourth-best concert tour and calling it one of her most "ambitious and intense" productions.

== Commercial reception ==
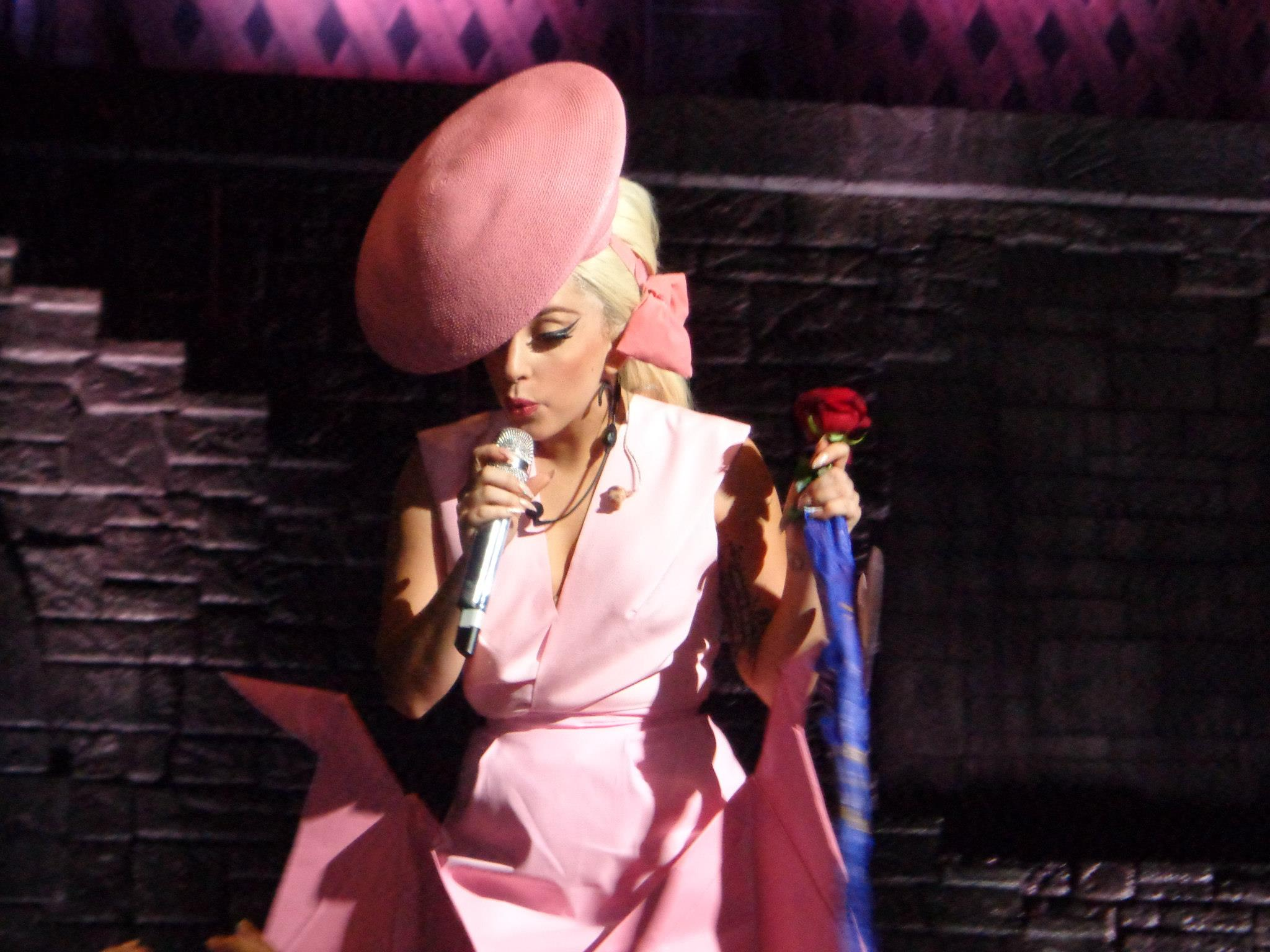
Lady Gaga performing on the Born This Way Ball tour, which the MDNA Tour surpassed in South American ticket sales.

Tickets went on sale immediately after Madonna's Super Bowl performance, with members of her official fan club receiving early access to tickets, VIP packages, and exclusive merchandise. US prices ranged from $45 to over $350, with premium options near $600 —a point of criticism that Madonna dismissed by saying, "People spend $300 on crazy things all the time [...] I'm worth it". According to Billboard, more than 1.4 million tickets had sold by April 2012, grossing $214 million; Fogel said the tour was "completely on track to end up in the top 10 tours of all time". Demand was intense worldwide: shows in Istanbul, Montreal, Los Angeles, and other major cities sold out within minutes, Berlin and Amsterdam sold out in hours, and 50,000 tickets in Istanbul were gone in four days. Madonna's first ever show in Abu Dhabi had fans lined up in front of the Virgin Megastore since 7 a.m. (GST), according to The National; all 22,000 tickets sold out in hours, prompting the addition of a second date.

In North and Latin America, sales were equally strong. The first 60,000 tickets for New York's Yankee Stadium sold out in 20 minutes, Ottawa broke a venue record with 15,000 tickets sold in 21 minutes, and Quebec City moved 65,000 tickets in an hour. In Mexico City, thousands of the most expensive tickets sold out within minutes of pre-sale, Medellín sold 38,000 pre-sale tickets in record time, and Brazil sold over 100,000 in just two days. Digital Spy then reported that MDNA had outsold Lady Gaga's Born This Way Ball in South America despite ticket prices being up to three times higher.

By the end of its 88 sold-out shows, MDNA grossed $305.2 million ($428.01 million in 2025 dollars), becoming the tenth highest-grossing tour of the time and the second highest for a female artist, behind Madonna's own Sticky & Sweet Tour. Billboard named it the most lucrative tour of 2012, making it Madonna's third time closing a year at the top of the box office heap, the others being 2009 and 2004. The artist also joined the Rolling Stones, the Grateful Dead and Bon Jovi as the only acts to be Billboard's highest-grossing tour twice in a three-year span. Madonna was awarded Top Touring Artist at the 2013 Billboard Music Awards.

== Controversies ==
=== Politics ===
The "Nobody Knows Me" video interlude drew sharp criticism from France's far-right after depicting politician Marine Le Pen with a swastika on her forehead before morphing into Adolf Hitler. Le Pen responded by accusing Madonna of stealing —and later buying— her adopted African children, claiming the singer was seeking publicity because "her songs don't work anymore", and threatened legal action if the video remained unchanged for the Paris and Nice shows. When the Paris performance went ahead unaltered on July 14, the National Front sued for "public insult", with party officials accusing Madonna of using the controversy to sell tickets. Former party leader Jean-Marie Le Pen suggested his daughter demand $1 million in damages from Madonna and her tour organizers. Socialist politician Najat Vallaud-Belkacem called the incident "regrettable", but anti-racism group SOS Racisme defended the video as "anti-racist and feminist". The singer herself said her aim was to "promote tolerance", but The Hollywood Reporter claimed the dispute hurt ticket sales in France, with 4,400 Nice tickets given away. At the Nice concert, the swastika was replaced with a question mark, which National Front representatives hailed as a victory.

Political statements on other cities also sparked reactions. In Washington, D.C., Madonna endorsed then-president Barack Obama, referring to him as a "black Muslim" — later clarifying it was ironic and meant to challenge prejudice. In Louisiana, her pro-Obama remarks drew both cheers and boos, prompting her to stress that audience members should value their right to vote regardless of political affiliation. At her Los Angeles show, Madonna dedicated "Human Nature" (1995) to Malala Yousafzai, the 14-year-old Pakistani activist shot by the Taliban for advocating girls' education. Condemning the attack as "sickness and absurdity", she urged support for women's rights and revealed "Malala" painted on her back. The gesture received mixed responses in Pakistan, with some criticizing her via social media.

=== Firearms and nudity ===
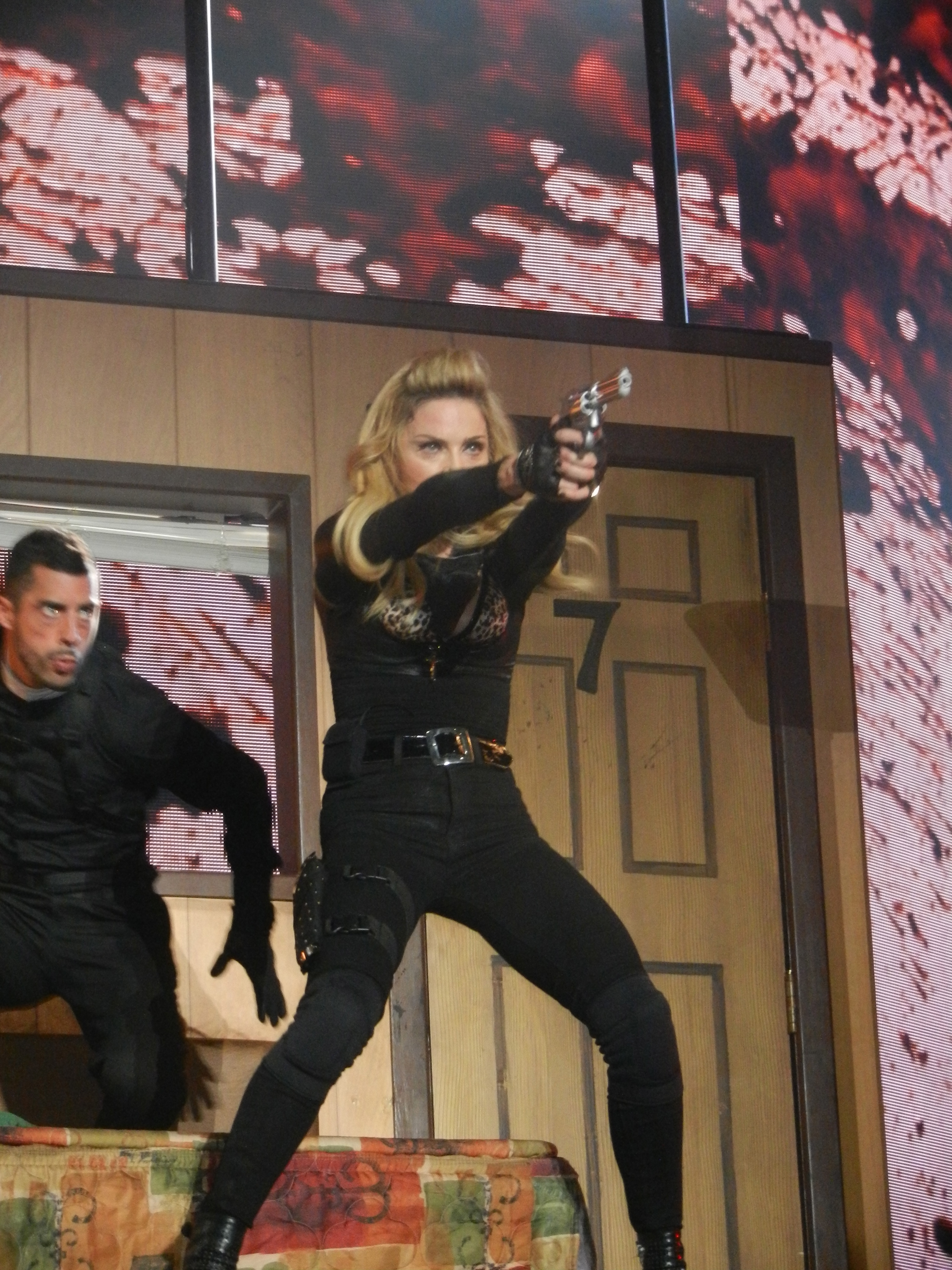
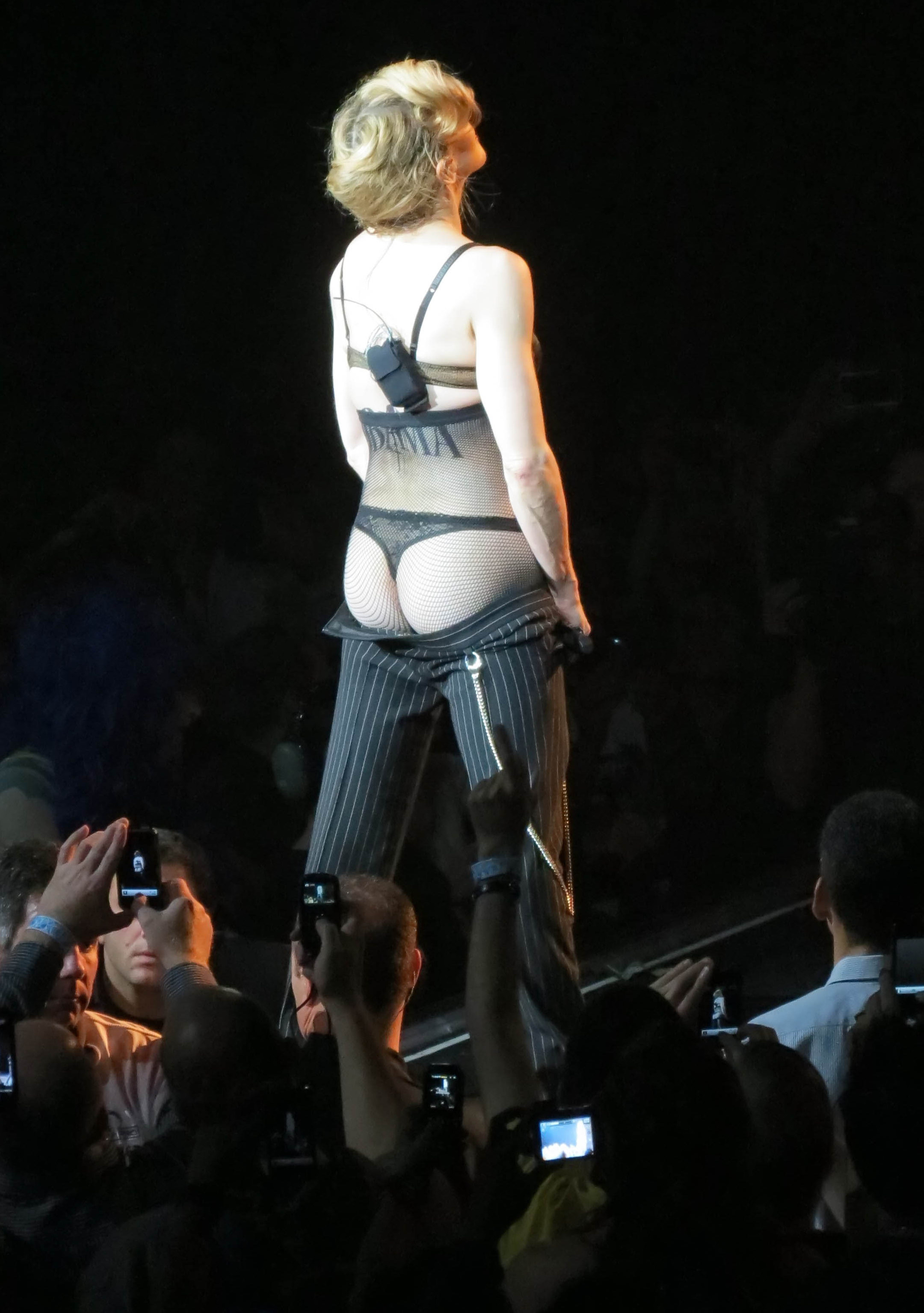
Numbers such as "Gang Bang" (left) and "Human Nature" (right) were met with backlash due to the involvement of firearms and nudity, respectively.

The use of firearms during "Revolver" and "Gang Bang" drew backlash, particularly after Madonna defied a local ban on fake guns in Scotland just 36 hours after the Colorado theater shooting. Joking onstage, she told the crowd, "Due to your laws here they might pull the plug on me, so if they cut us off suddenly, write to your local MP". A spokesman for Mothers Against Guns called the scenes "in bad taste" given the recent tragedy, and in Denver, several audience members reportedly left during the segment. Liz Rosenberg defended Madonna, saying she would "rather cancel her show than censor her art". Speaking to Good Morning America, the singer refused to alter the performance: "That would be like asking people to not have guns in action movies... guns don't kill people, people kill people. That whole first section of the show is like an action movie, and I was playing a super-vixen who wanted revenge". In a letter to Billboard, she added:

"I do not condone violence or the use of guns [...] they are symbols of wanting to appear strong and wanting to find a way to stop feelings that I find hurtful or damaging. In my case I want to stop the lies and hypocrisy of the church, the intolerance of many narrow minded cultures and societies I have experienced throughout my life and in some cases the pain I have felt from having my heart broken".

Critical reception to the segment was mixed. Neil McCormick called it "quite unpleasantly aggressive" but admitted aggression suited Madonna, while Gary Flockhart deemed it "exhilarating if in bad taste". Others, like Andrew Matson and Mark Segal Kemp, noted it prompted walkouts and cast a shadow over the first half, though Marc-André Lemieux praised Madonna's "invested, passionate, and even possessed" delivery.

The "Human Nature" performance also caused controversy for onstage nudity. In Turkey, Madonna briefly exposed a nipple; in Rome, she mooned the audience. Some, like India Today Deepti Jakhar, felt the stunts seemed "desperate" to recapture past shock value, while Entertainment Weekly's Annie Barrett called them inauthentic. BuzzFeed's Amy Odell defended the singer in an article titled "Leave Madonna's 53-year-old breast alone"; "apparently now when that inevitable thing called aging happens, [women] have to worry about covering up enough so that we don't look 'desperate' [...] Heavens! Women who are 53 still have breasts and... sex drives!", Odell wrote.

=== Paris's Olympia concert ===
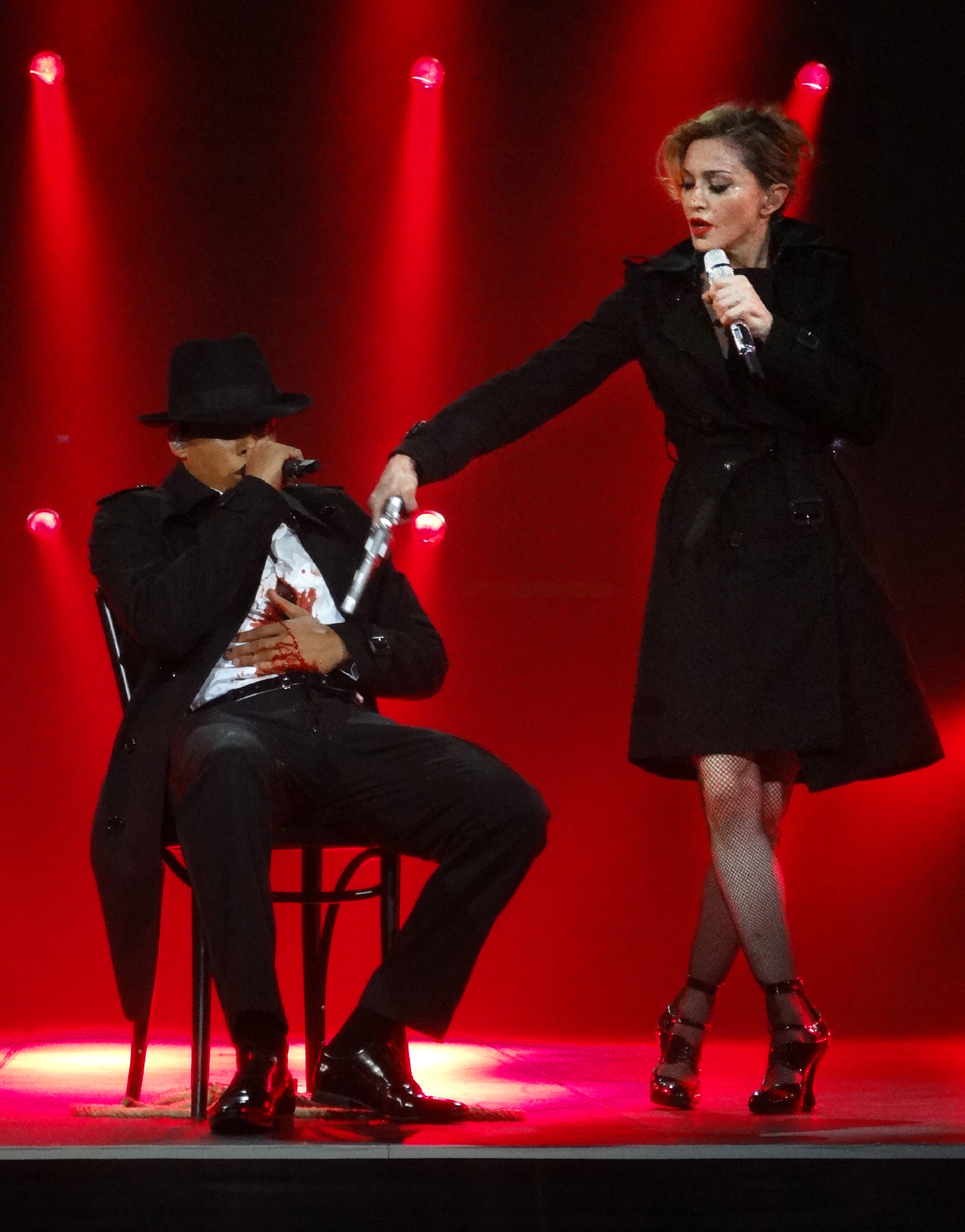
Madonna performing a mashup of "Die Another Day" (2002) and "Beautiful Killer" at Paris's Olympia on July 17; the show drew widespread criticism from fans for its brief 45-minute runtime.

On July 17, it was announced that Madonna would give an "intimate one night only performance" at Paris's Olympia hall on July 26, described as a tribute to her love for French art, cinema, and the country's history of inspiring artists. Tickets, which went on sale first to members of her fan club, before being released to the public with a two-per-person limit, generated "overwhelming" demand. Songs performed on this date included a mashup of Madonna's 2002 single "Die Another Day" and MDNA album track "Beautiful Killer", as well as a cover of Serge Gainsbourg's "Je t'aime... moi non plus" (1969).

The show was met with heavy criticism from fans, many of whom had paid over €280 or queued overnight, as it lasted only 45 minutes. Attendees booed and shouted insults, while crowds gathered outside demanding refunds. Social media backlash followed, with the YouTube video of the performance receiving over 12,000 dislikes within a day. Some also objected to the political remarks the singer made during the set. Rosenberg stressed the event was never billed as the full MDNA concert, noting it cost close to $1 million to stage and was in line with Madonna's past club dates, which were also under an hour. Madonna herself addressed the controversy:

"Playing the Olympia was a magical moment for me and it was real treat to do this special show for my fans and be so close to them. Unfortunately at the end of the show – after I left the stage – a few thugs who were not my fans rushed the stage and started throwing plastic bottles pretending to be angry fans. The press reports have focused on this and not the joyous aspect of the evening. But nothing can take away or ruin this very special evening for me and my fans. When I looked out in the audience, everyone I saw had a smile on their face. I look forward to having this wonderful experience again".

=== Pussy Riot and LGBT rights in Russia ===
"I know there are many sides to every story, and I mean no disrespect to the church or the government. But I think that these three girls — Masha, Katya, Nadya — I think that they have done something courageous. I think they have paid the price for this act. And I pray for their freedom".

— Madonna's speech in Moscow regarding the arrest of Pussy Riot.

Madonna's Russian concerts sparked major controversy. Ahead of the shows, she voiced support for the jailed feminist punk band Pussy Riot, calling their treatment "unfair" and defending freedom of speech as central to her career. In Moscow, she wore the group's signature balaclava and revealed their name written across her back, prompting a public thank-you from the band but sharp criticism from Russian officials, including Deputy Prime Minister Dmitry Rogozin. After the members were sentenced to two years in prison, Madonna issued a statement condemning the verdict and urging artists worldwide to protest; "I call on all those who love freedom to condemn this unjust punishment. I urge artists around the world to speak up in protest against this travesty. [...] I call on ALL of Russia to let Pussy Riot go free".

Her second stop, in Saint Petersburg, drew terrorist threats and a warning from the US Embassy. The singer used the concert to oppose Russia's so-called anti-gay law, handing out pink wristbands, waving rainbow flags, and delivering a speech comparing LGBT struggles to Martin Luther King Jr.'s fight for equality. In response, ten activists sued her for $10.4 million, claiming she had promoted "homosexual propaganda" and "insulted their feelings". The case was dismissed in November 2012, but in 2020 Madonna revealed she had been fined $1 million by the Russian government —a penalty she never paid. In 2015, it was reported that Madonna had told Entertainment Weekly that she would most likely never visit Russia again because of its stands on gay rights.

== Broadcast and recording ==
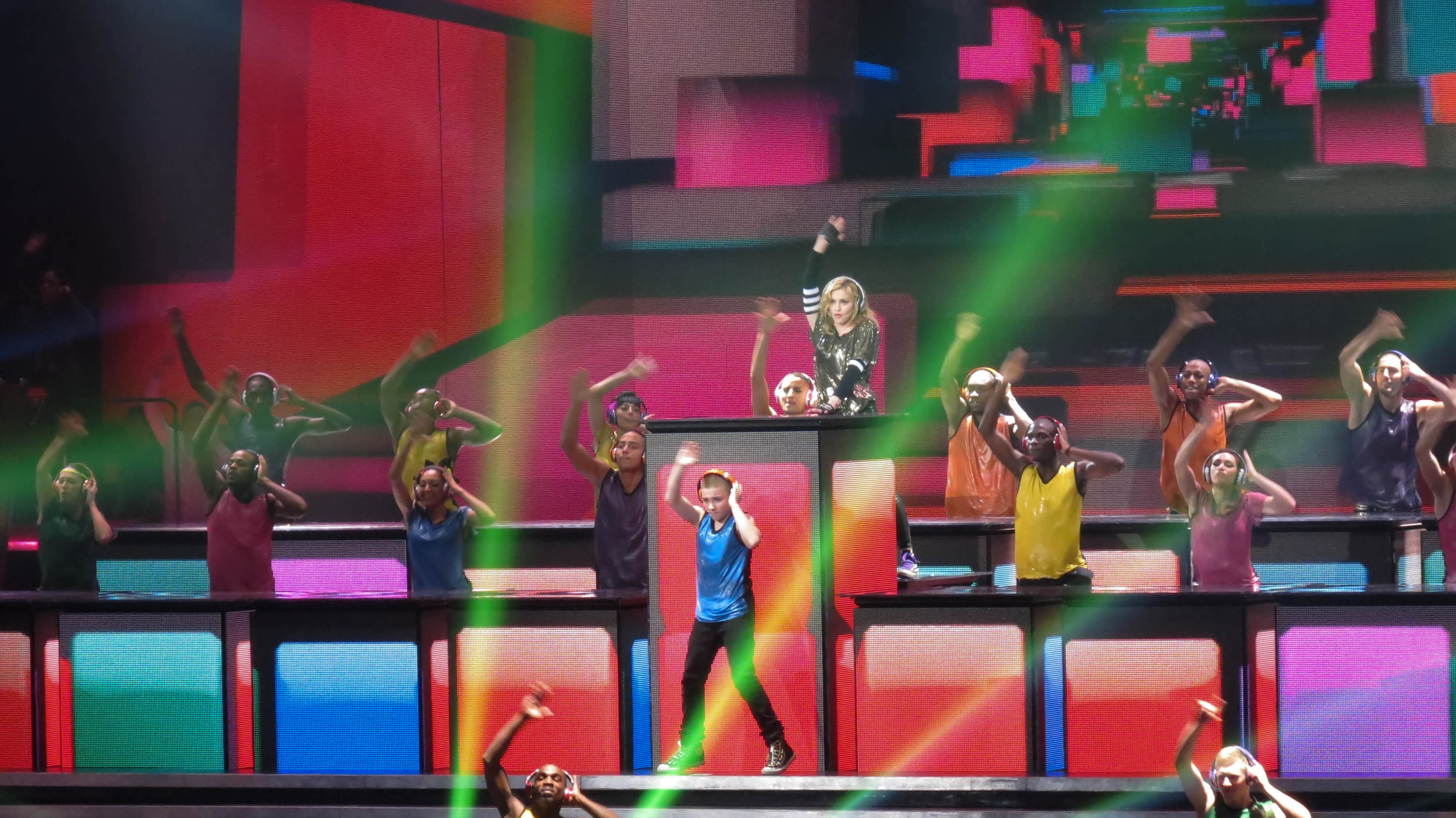
The final performance of the night, "Celebration", with the singer and dancers mimicking DJ moves

In May 2012, the Algemeiner Journal reported that Conan O'Brien would travel to Israel to film a special episode of his late-night talk show around the tour's opening night. The broadcast included a segment with comedian Billy Eichner interviewing people in New York and Israel about topics ranging from Iran's nuclear crisis to whether they were attending Madonna's concert. Later in October, Eichner met the singer backstage while she rehearsed for her Yankee Stadium show. Shot in Rome, Inside The DNA of MDNA was a 7-minute behind the scenes video posted on Madonna's official YouTube channel on July 9. The Olympia concert was streamed live via LoveLive's YouTube channel; creative director Toby L said the event "typifies what we’re doing with the LoveLive music series, which will continue to feature the world's most recognizable music artists".

On November 9, Madonna confirmed the tour's official DVD would be filmed at her November 19–20 shows at Miami's American Airlines Arena, after initial plans to record in Colombia fell through due to scheduling conflicts with the directors. Directed by Danny B. Tull and Stephane Sennour, Madonna: The MDNA Tour premiered on June 18, 2013, at New York's Paris Theater with the singer in attendance, and aired four days later on EPIX. Released on September 10 in DVD, Blu-ray, and double-disc live album formats under the title MDNA World Tour, it drew mixed reviews —praised for technical precision and visuals but criticized for omitting several major hits— yet became Madonna's sixth consecutive and tenth overall video to top Billboard's Top Music Videos chart.

== Set list ==
Set list, samples and notes adapted per Madonna's official website, the notes and track listing of MDNA World Tour, and additional sources.

Act 1: Transgression

1. "Virgin Mary" (Introduction; contains elements of "Psalm 91" and "Birjina Gaztetto Bat Zegoen")
2. "Girl Gone Wild" (Contains elements of "Material Girl" and "Give It 2 Me")
3. "Revolver"
4. "Gang Bang"
5. "Papa Don't Preach"
6. "Hung Up" (Contains elements of "Girl Gone Wild" and "Sorry")
7. "I Don't Give A"
8. "Best Friend" / "Heartbeat" (Video interlude)

Act 2: Prophecy

9. "Express Yourself" (Contains excerpts from "Born This Way" and "She's Not Me")
10. "Give Me All Your Luvin'" (Just Blaze remix)
11. "Turning Up the Hits" (Video interlude; contains elements of "Holiday", "Into the Groove", "Lucky Star", "Like a Virgin", "4 Minutes", "Ray of Light", and "Music")
12. "Turn Up the Radio"
13. "Open Your Heart" / "Sagarra Jo!"
14. "Masterpiece"

Act 3: Masculine/Feminine

15. "Justify My Love" (William Orbit remix; video interlude)
16. "Vogue"
17. "Candy Shop" (Contains elements of "Ashamed of Myself" and excerpts from "Erotica")
18. "Human Nature"
19. "Like a Virgin" (Contains elements of "Evgeni's Waltz")

Act 4: Redemption

20. "Nobody Knows Me" (Remix; video interlude)
21. "I'm Addicted"
22. "I'm a Sinner" (Contains elements from "Cyber-Raga")
23. "Like a Prayer" (Contains elements of "De Treville-n Azken Hitzak")
24. "Celebration" (Contains elements of "Girl Gone Wild" and "Give It 2 Me")

Notes

- "Holiday" and "Love Spent" were sung in select concerts in the Americas.
- During the first San Jose concert, Madonna sang "Everybody" to commemorate its 30th anniversary.
- On the second Madison Square Garden show, Psy joined Madonna onstage for a mashup performance of "Gangnam Style", "Give It 2 Me" and "Music".
- During the second concert in Mexico City, Madonna sang "Spanish Lesson".
- "Don't Cry for Me Argentina" was sung during the first Buenos Aires concert.
- In Santiago, due to technical issues caused by heavy rain, the entire first act was cut and the concert began with "Express Yourself".
- Halfway through the final concert in Córdoba, a broken generator caused a 40-minute power outage. "Masterpiece" and "Justify My Love" were not performed; Madonna instead did an impromptu rendition of "Holiday" with a megaphone.

== Shows ==
List of concerts
Date (2012)	City	Country	Venue	Opening act	Attendance (Tickets sold / available)	Revenue
May 31 (Note: This concert was declared by Madonna as a "Concert for Peace", inviting several peace organizations to honor and acknowledge people seeking peace in the Middle East. The concert was merged with the one set to take place two days earlier, on May 29, due to production delays, and tickets dated May 29 were honored at the rescheduled May 31 event.)	Ramat Gan (Note: Labeled as Tel Aviv in promotional material.)	Israel	Ramat Gan Stadium	Martin Solveig	33,457 / 33,457	$4,339,876
June 3	Abu Dhabi	United Arab Emirates	du Arena	Benny Benassi	45,722 / 45,722	$8,053,500
June 4	Abu Dhabi	United Arab Emirates	du Arena	Benny Benassi	45,722 / 45,722	$8,053,500
June 7	Istanbul	Turkey	Türk Telekom Arena	Offer Nissim	47,789 / 47,789	$6,219,598
June 12	Rome	Italy	Stadio Olimpico	Martin Solveig	36,658 / 36,658	$2,835,542
June 14	Milan	Italy	Stadio San Siro	Martin Solveig	53,244 / 53,244	$5,624,570
June 16	Florence	Italy	Stadio Artemio Franchi	Martin Solveig	42,434 / 42,434	$4,252,680
June 20	Barcelona	Spain	Palau Sant Jordi	Martin Solveig	33,178 / 33,178	$3,893,274
June 21	Barcelona	Spain	Palau Sant Jordi	Martin Solveig	33,178 / 33,178	$3,893,274
June 24	Coimbra	Portugal	Estádio Cidade de Coimbra	Martin Solveig	33,597 / 33,597	$3,156,022
June 28	Berlin	Germany	O_{2} World	Martin Solveig	25,481 / 25,481	$3,679,378
June 30	Berlin	Germany	O_{2} World	Martin Solveig	25,481 / 25,481	$3,679,378
July 2	Copenhagen	Denmark	Parken Stadium	Martin Solveig	29,416 / 29,416	$2,980,465
July 4	Gothenburg	Sweden	Ullevi Stadium	Martin Solveig	36,472 / 36,472	$4,510,807
July 7	Amsterdam	Netherlands	Ziggo Dome	Martin Solveig	29,172 / 29,172	$3,777,245
July 8	Amsterdam	Netherlands	Ziggo Dome	Martin Solveig	29,172 / 29,172	$3,777,245
July 10	Cologne	Germany	Lanxess Arena	Martin Solveig	14,489 / 14,489	$1,775,841
July 12	Brussels	Belgium	King Baudouin Stadium	Martin Solveig	36,778 / 36,778	$3,676,447
July 14	Paris	France	Stade de France	Martin Solveig	62,195 / 62,195	$7,195,799
July 17	London	England	Hyde Park	LMFAO	54,140 / 54,140	$6,714,027
July 19	Birmingham	England	National Indoor Arena	Alesso	11,684 / 11,684	$1,998,196
July 21	Edinburgh	Scotland	Murrayfield Stadium	Alesso	52,160 / 52,160	$4,974,731
July 24	Dublin	Ireland	Aviva Stadium	Alesso	33,953 / 33,953	$3,175,497
July 26	Paris	France	L'Olympia	—N/a	2,576 / 2,576	$346,653
July 29	Vienna	Austria	Ernst-Happel-Stadion	Martin Solveig	33,250 / 33,250	$1,953,791
August 1	Warsaw	Poland	Stadion Narodowy	Paul Oakenfold	38,699 / 38,699	$2,933,410
August 4	Kyiv	Ukraine	Olympic Stadium	Sebastian Ingrosso	31,022 / 31,022	$4,893,317
August 7	Moscow	Russia	Olimpiyskiy	Alesso	19,842 / 19,842	$4,074,400
August 9	Saint Petersburg	Russia	SKK Peterburgsky	Alesso	19,079 / 19,079	$2,683,569
August 12	Helsinki	Finland	Helsinki Olympic Stadium	Martin Solveig	42,760 / 42,760	$5,589,900
August 15	Oslo	Norway	Telenor Arena	CLMD	18,631 / 18,631	$3,017,871
August 18	Zürich	Switzerland	Letzigrund	Martin Solveig	37,792 / 37,792	$4,989,192
August 21	Nice	France	Stade Charles-Ehrmann	LMFAO	29,670 / 29,670	$2,386,311
August 28	Philadelphia	United States	Wells Fargo Center	Laidback Luke	15,741 / 15,741	$2,651,855
August 30	Montreal	Canada	Bell Centre	Martin Solveig	16,918 / 16,918	$3,457,482
September 1	Quebec City	Canada	Plains of Abraham	Paul Oakenfold	70,569 / 70,569	$8,098,292
September 4	Boston	United States	TD Garden	—N/a	13,995 / 13,995	$2,450,720
September 6	New York City	United States	Yankee Stadium	Avicii	79,775 / 79,775	$12,599,540
September 8	New York City	United States	Yankee Stadium	Avicii	79,775 / 79,775	$12,599,540
September 10	Ottawa	Canada	Scotiabank Place	Paul Oakenfold	14,422 / 14,422	$2,371,994
September 12	Toronto	Canada	Air Canada Centre	Paul Oakenfold	32,557 / 32,557	$7,458,188
September 13	Toronto	Canada	Air Canada Centre	Paul Oakenfold	32,557 / 32,557	$7,458,188
September 15	Atlantic City	United States	Boardwalk Hall	Paul Oakenfold	12,207 / 12,207	$2,891,340
September 19	Chicago	United States	United Center	Paul Oakenfold	28,143 / 28,143	$5,102,880
September 20	Chicago	United States	United Center	Paul Oakenfold	28,143 / 28,143	$5,102,880
September 23	Washington, D.C.	United States	Verizon Center	Benny Benassi	27,944 / 27,944	$4,860,428
September 24	Washington, D.C.	United States	Verizon Center	Benny Benassi	27,944 / 27,944	$4,860,428
September 29	Vancouver	Canada	Rogers Arena	Martin Solveig	28,500 / 28,500	$4,758,994
September 30	Vancouver	Canada	Rogers Arena	Martin Solveig	28,500 / 28,500	$4,758,994
October 2	Seattle	United States	KeyArena	Martin Solveig	23,651 / 23,651	$3,723,405
October 3	Seattle	United States	KeyArena	Martin Solveig	23,651 / 23,651	$3,723,405
October 6	San Jose	United States	HP Pavilion	Martin Solveig; MiSha Skye	25,907 / 25,907	$4,791,285
October 7	San Jose	United States	HP Pavilion	Martin Solveig; MiSha Skye	25,907 / 25,907	$4,791,285
October 10	Los Angeles	United States	Staples Center	Martin Solveig	29,015 / 29,015	$6,162,835
October 11	Los Angeles	United States	Staples Center	Martin Solveig	29,015 / 29,015	$6,162,835
October 13	Las Vegas	United States	MGM Grand Garden Arena	Martin Solveig	24,991 / 24,991	$7,188,879
October 14	Las Vegas	United States	MGM Grand Garden Arena	Martin Solveig	24,991 / 24,991	$7,188,879
October 16	Phoenix	United States	US Airways Center	MiSha Skye	13,239 / 13,239	$2,389,060
October 18	Denver	United States	Pepsi Center	MiSha Skye	13,280 / 13,280	$2,135,835
October 21	Dallas	United States	American Airlines Center	Benny Benassi	14,360 / 14,360	$2,329,690
October 24	Houston	United States	Toyota Center	Martin Solveig	24,797 / 24,797	$4,390,355
October 25	Houston	United States	Toyota Center	Martin Solveig	24,797 / 24,797	$4,390,355
October 27	New Orleans	United States	New Orleans Arena	Paul Oakenfold	14,498 / 14,498	$2,261,515
October 30	Kansas City	United States	Sprint Center	Paul Oakenfold	14,108 / 14,108	$2,366,220
November 1	St. Louis	United States	Scottrade Center	Paul Oakenfold	16,022 / 16,022	$2,449,110
November 3	Saint Paul	United States	Xcel Energy Center	Paul Oakenfold	26,084 / 26,084	$4,229,005
November 4	Saint Paul	United States	Xcel Energy Center	Paul Oakenfold	26,084 / 26,084	$4,229,005
November 6	Pittsburgh	United States	Consol Energy Center	Paul Oakenfold	14,120 / 14,120	$2,358,670
November 8	Detroit	United States	Joe Louis Arena	Paul Oakenfold	13,716 / 13,716	$1,833,154
November 10	Cleveland	United States	Quicken Loans Arena	Paul Oakenfold	16,487 / 16,487	$2,546,780
November 12	New York City	United States	Madison Square Garden	Martin Solveig	24,790 / 24,790	$4,846,665
November 13	New York City	United States	Madison Square Garden	Martin Solveig	24,790 / 24,790	$4,846,665
November 15	Charlotte	United States	Time Warner Cable Arena	Martin Solveig	13,817 / 13,817	$2,208,180
November 17	Atlanta	United States	Philips Arena	Paul Oakenfold	13,504 / 13,504	$2,379,792
November 19	Miami	United States	American Airlines Arena	Paul Oakenfold	27,976 / 27,976	$5,241,125
November 20	Miami	United States	American Airlines Arena	Paul Oakenfold	27,976 / 27,976	$5,241,125
November 24	Mexico City	Mexico	Foro Sol	Paul Oakenfold	84,382 / 84,382	$11,586,745
November 25	Mexico City	Mexico	Foro Sol	Paul Oakenfold	84,382 / 84,382	$11,586,745
November 28	Medellín	Colombia	Estadio Atanasio Girardot	Paul Oakenfold	90,018 / 90,018	$14,741,104
November 29	Medellín	Colombia	Estadio Atanasio Girardot	Paul Oakenfold	90,018 / 90,018	$14,741,104
December 2 (Note: This concert was set to take place one day earlier, on December 1, but was rescheduled due to scheduling conflicts.)	Rio de Janeiro	Brazil	Parque dos Atletas	Felguk	34,709 / 34,709	$4,332,428
December 4	São Paulo	Brazil	Estádio do Morumbi	Gui Boratto	85,255 / 85,255	$8,430,677
December 5	São Paulo	Brazil	Estádio do Morumbi	Gui Boratto	85,255 / 85,255	$8,430,677
December 9	Porto Alegre	Brazil	Estádio Olímpico Monumental	Fabrício Peçanha	42,524 / 42,524	$7,578,191
December 13	Buenos Aires	Argentina	River Plate Stadium	Laidback Luke	89,226 / 89,226	$10,820,041
December 15	Buenos Aires	Argentina	River Plate Stadium	Laidback Luke	89,226 / 89,226	$10,820,041
December 19	Santiago	Chile	Estadio Nacional	Laidback Luke	47,625 / 47,625	$3,867,601
December 22	Córdoba	Argentina	Estadio Mario Alberto Kempes	Laidback Luke	48,133 / 48,133	$5,566,393
Total					2,212,345 / 2,212,345 (100%)	$305,158,362

=== Cancelled dates ===
List of cancelled concerts
Date (2012)	City	Country	Venue	Reason
June 11	Zagreb	Croatia	Stadion Maksimir	Scheduling conflicts
October 20	Dallas	United States	American Airlines Center	Laryngitis

== Personnel ==
Adapted from The MDNA Tour program.

=== Band ===
- Madonna – creator, vocals, guitar
- Kiley Dean – vocals
- Nicki Richards – vocals
- Kevin Antunes – musical director, keyboards, programmer
- Brian Frasier-Moore – drums
- Ric'key Pageot – piano, keyboards
- Monte Pittman – guitar
- Jason Yang – violin
- Sean Spuehler – vocal mixing engineer

=== Dancers ===
- Adrien Galo – dancer
- Ali "Lilou" Ramdani – dancer
- Brahim Zaibat – dancer
- Chaz Buzan – dancer
- Derrell Bullock – dancer
- Drew Dollaz – dancer
- Emilie Capel – dancer
- Emilie Schram – dancer
- Habby "Hobgoblin" Jacques – dancer
- Kupono Aweau – dancer
- Charles "Lil Buck" Riley – dancer
- Loic "Speedylegz" Mabanza – dancer
- Lourdes Leon – dancer
- Marion Molin – dancer
- Marvin Gofin – dancer
- Rocco Ritchie – dancer
- Sasha Mallery – dancer
- Sheik Mondesir – dancer
- Stephanie Nguyen – dancer
- Valeree Pohl – dancer
- Vibez Henderson – dancer
- Yaman "Yamsonite" Okur – dancer
- Hayden Nickell – slackliner
- Jaan Roose – slackliner

=== Choreographers ===
- Alison Faulk – supervising choreographer
- Jason Young – supervising choreographer
- Megan Lawson – choreographer
- Derrell Bullock – choreographer
- Marvin & Marion – choreographers
- Swoop & Goofy – choreographers
- Ali "Lilou" Ramdani – choreographer
- Kalakan Trio – choreographers
- Leesa Csolak – baton coach
- Damon Grant – drum coach
- Josh Greenwood – slackline coach, Shaolin master

=== Wardrobe ===
- Arianne Phillips – designer
- Jean Paul Gaultier – designer
- Alexander Wang – designer
- Jeremy Scott – designer
- Linda Matthews – costume supervisor
- Laura Morgan – assistant costume designer
- Terry Anderson – assistant costume designer
- Molly Rebuschatis – assistant to Arianne Phillips
- Phil Boutte – illustrator
- Natasha Paczkowski – cutter fitter
- Crystal Thompson – cutter fitter
- Graeme Kalbe – shopper
- Kareem James – shopper
- Jocelyn Goldstein – shopper
- Nicki Moody – shopper
- Marley Glassroth – shopper
- Seana Gordon – shopper
- Brianna Patterson – costume coordinator
- Willie Leon – costume production assistant
- Alexis Hilferte Forte – costume production assistant

=== Participating designers ===
- Truth or Dare Intimates & Footwear
- Miu Miu
- Prada
- Brooks Brothers
- Adidas
- Y-3
- Dolce & Gabbana
- Dsquared2

=== Show ===
- Jamie King – creative director
- Tiffany Olson – creative director assistant
- Michel Laprise – show director
- Richmond Talauega – co-director
- Anthony Talauega – co-director
- Mark Fisher – show architect

=== Crew ===
- Tony Villaneuva – Madonna's dresser
- Lana Czajka – head wardrobe
- Lisa Nishimura – wardrobe
- Renee Sola – wardrobe
- Julie Sola – wardrobe
- Pam Lewis – wardrobe
- Krystie Rodriguez – wardrobe
- Deb Cooper – wardrobe

=== Staff ===
- Tres Thomas – tour director
- Frankie Enfield – artist tour manager
- Jason Milner – tour manager
- Cynthia Oknaian – ticketing manager
- Jill McCutchan – assistant tour manager
- Gingi Levin – assistant artist tour manager
- Rafael Pagan – tour management assistant
- Robert “Bongo” Longo - Head Backline : Kevin Antunes Tech
- Andy LeCompte – key hair stylist for Madonna
- Gina Brooke – key make-up artist for Madonna
- Jean-Michel Ete – kinesitherapeute
- Courtney Rousso – hotel advance
- Jerry Meltzer – security
- Didier Meert – security
- Huge Rodriguez – family security
- Marco Pernini – artist chef
- Mayumi Niimi – artist chef
- Michelle Peck – aesthetician, masseuse
- Nicole Winhoffer – personal trainer
- Suzanne Lynch – physical therapist
- Abel Meza – artist driver

== See also ==
- List of most-attended concert tours
- List of highest-grossing concert tours by women
- List of highest-grossing concert tours
