= 702 (album) =

Studio album by 702
- Released: June 15, 1999
- Genres: R&B; hip pop
- Length: 49:05
- Label: Motown
- Producers: Bruce Carbone; Kedar Massenburg; Bag; Warryn "Smiley" Campbell; Greg Charley; Dutch; Jany; Marc Kinchen; Missy Elliott; PI & Jam; Rapture Stewart; Eric Seats; Soulshock & Karlin; Maurice Wilcher

702 chronology
No Doubt (1996)	702 (1999)	Star (2003)

Singles from 702
- 1. "Where My Girls At?" Released: April 5, 1999; 2. "You Don't Know" Released: August 3, 1999; 3. "Gotta Leave" Released: February 7, 2000

702 is the second studio album by American R&B group 702. It was released on June 15, 1999, by Motown. The album peaked at number thirty-four on the Billboard 200 chart. By November 2002, it was certified platinum in sales by the RIAA, after shipments exceeding 1,000,000 copies in the United States while Nielsen SoundScan sales topped 590,000 copies.

== Critical reception ==
Professional ratings
Review scores
Source	Rating
AllMusic	3/5 stars
Entertainment Weekly	C+

Vibe editor Larry Flick found that "this fine, self-titled project wisely reconnects [702] with red-hot Missy Elliott [...] Although they hold their own with other high-profile producers, it's with La Eliott that their growth is mast evident and their chemistry most potent. Lotsa girl groups out there are racing to be a new-generation En Vogue, and 702 could be the first to cross the finish line. Paul Verna from Billboard praised the albums material and thought the group did a good job delivering an album "full of satisfying, hip-shaking tracks, not just a few radio-friendly singles".

Stephen Thomas Erlewine at AllMusic was critical of the album's running time and felt it was padded with some filler songs; however, he did call the work "a true step forward for 702." Beth Johnson from Entertainment Weekly was mixed in her review although she thought the album was "cannily polished" due to its writers and producers, she declared it's "hard to distinguish" 702 "from the swelling tsunami of R&B girl groups."

== Commercial performance ==
The album peaked at thirty-four on the U.S. Billboard 200 and reached the seventh spot on the R&B Albums chart. The album was certified gold in September 1999, and reached platinum status in November 2002.

== Track listing ==
702 track listing
No.	Title	Lyrics	Music	Length
1.	""7" Interlude"	Marc Kinchen; Irish Grinstead	Kinchen	0:38
2.	"Where My Girls At?"	Missy Elliott; Eric Seats; Rapture Stewart	Elliott; Stewart; Seats	2:46
3.	"You Don't Know"	Channette Higgens; Channoah Higgens; Carsten Schack; Kenneth Karlin	Soulshock & Karlin	4:08
4.	"Make Time"	Greg Charley; Robbie Nevil	Charley	4:24
5.	""0" Interlude"	Kinchen; Misha Grinstead	Kinchen	0:40
6.	"You'll Just Never Know"	Everett Benton; LaMenga Kafi; Pi Gadget	PI & Jam	5:00
7.	"Finally"	Charley	Charley	4:30
8.	"Tell Your Girl"	Eric Jackson; Cynthia Loving; Rick Cousin	Dutch	3:48
9.	"Gotta Leave"	Elliott; Stewart; Seats	Elliott; Stewart; Seats	5:08
10.	"Don't Go Breaking My Heart"	Anders Bagge	Bagge; Jany	3:59
11.	""2" Interlude"	Kinchen; Kameelah Williams	Kinchen	0:44
12.	"What More Can He Do"	Erica Atkins; Trecina Atkins; Warryn Campbell; John Smith	Campbell	3:49
13.	"Seven"	Antoinette Roberson; Kamall Machicote; Maurice Wilcher	Wilcher	4:44
14.	"Will You Be OK"	Angela Slates; Kinchen; Trina Powell; Tamara Powell	Kinchen	4:23
Total length:				49:05

== Credits and personnel ==
- bass – Everett "Jam" Benton, Jay Rakes, Romeo Williams
- drums – Everett "Jam" Benton
- executive production – Bruce Carbone, Billy Gray, Kedar Massenburg
- guitar – Mats Berntoft, Eric Jackson, Joshua Thompson
- keyboards – Everett "Jam" Johnson
- mixing – Mick Guzauski, Manny Marroquin, Dave Pensado
- production – Bag, Warryn "Smiley" Campbell, Greg Charley, Dutch, Jany, Marc Kinchen, Missy Elliott, PI & Jam, Rapture Stewart, Eric Seats, Soulshock & Karlin, Maurice Wilcher
- recording – Anders Bagge, Jan Fairchild, Fredrick Sarhagen
- synthesizer – Everett "Jam" Benton
- vocals (background) – 702

== Charts ==
=== Weekly charts ===
Weekly chart performance for 702
Chart (1999)	Peak position
Canada Top Albums/CDs (RPM)	31
Dutch Albums (Album Top 100)	90
German Albums (Offizielle Top 100)	80
UK Albums (Official Charts)	112
UK R&B Albums (Official Charts)	18
US Billboard 200 (Billboard)	34
US Top R&B/Hip-Hop Albums (Billboard)	7

=== Year-end charts ===
Year-end chart performance for 702
Chart (1999)	Position
US Billboard 200	187
US Top R&B/Hip-Hop Albums (Billboard)	81

== Certifications ==
Certifications for 702
Region	Certification	Certified units/sales
Canada (Music Canada)	Gold	50,000^{^}
United States (RIAA)	Platinum	1,000,000^{^}
^{^} Shipments figures based on certification alone.
