= You Don't Know (702 song) =

Single by 702

from the album 702
- Released: August 3, 1999
- Genre: Funk
- Length: 4:08 (album version); 3:25 (radio edit)
- Label: Motown
- Songwriters: Channette Higgens; Channoah Higgens; Carsten Schack; Kenneth Karlin
- Producer: Soulshock and Karlin

702 singles chronology
"Where My Girls At?" (1999)	"You Don't Know" (1999)	"Gotta Leave" (2000)

"You Don't Know" is a song recorded by American R&B group 702. It written by Channette Higgens and Channoah Higgens from songwriting duo Anthem along with Soulshock and Karlin. Production of the song was overseen by Shack and Karlon under their moniker Soulshock and Karlin. The song was released by Motown as the second single from their self-titled second album (1999). A moderate commercial hit, it reached the top of the UK Hip Hop/R&B chart, but peaked at number 50 on the US Hot R&B/Hip-Hop Songs chart.

== Background ==
"You Don't Know" was written by Channette Higgens and Channoah Higgens from songwriting duo Anthem along with the song's record production team Soulshock and Karlin. During the recording of their sophomore album 702, the members 702 aimed to select songs that genuinely resonated with them. Upon listening to the demo tape of "You Don't Know," however, they found that the track did not appeal to them. Misha Grinstead commented in an interview with The Las Vegas Sun: "Honestly, to tell you the truth, when we heard the demo, we didn't like the song, but at the urging of Motown president Kedar Massenburg, it made the cut." She continued saying, "We had a really bad vibe about the song [...] and Kedar [...] was like, 'Well, you guys are doing the song.' And that's when we had to trust people who know more (about the music industry) than us and who we're trying to learn from."

== Music and lyrics ==
Described as being a "futuristic track" by Billboard, "You Don't Know" is a song about a girl liking a boy too much explained by 702 group member Irish. According to Irish Grinstead, "It's just one of those kinda songs [which says] 'I think I'm going crazy. I like you too much'."

== Chart performance ==
Less successful than previous single "Where My Girls At?", "You Don't Know" peaked number 50 on the US Hot R&B/Hip-Hop Songs chart in the week of August 28, 1999. The song also peaked within the top 40 of the UK Singles Chart, reaching number 36 in November 1999, while also peaking at number seven on the UK Hip Hop/R&B chart. "You Don't Know" also charted in other countries in Europe such as Germany and the Netherlands where it charted at numbers 90 and 60, respectively.

== Music video ==
A music video for "You Don't Know" was directed by Bille Woodruff and made its premiere on video station BET in the week ending August 15, 1999. It later premiered on The Box on the week ending August 22, 1999. The visuals were ranked 5th on Bustle's "22 Weird 90's Music Videos That You Somehow Managed to Forget About" list.

It features the members in a futuristic setting throughout the video. The video starts with the girls dressed as robots. While they are moving robotically, various clips from the music video are shown on medium TV screens. On one TV screen, Meelah is wearing a white dress; as she sings, white doves fly above her. The clip then reverts to the scene of the girls dressed as robots. During the chorus, Irish and Lemisha are shown in similar rooms as Meelah, with Irish wearing a blue outfit and Lemisha wearing a black outfit. The robotic scenes are shown simultaneously in between each girl's solo room scenes. The following video scene shows the three girls walking in the woods. While wandering the woods, they come across a cave and go in. After looking around the cave, they sing the song's chorus while standing around. While the girls are in the cave, three men walk around the woods with a tracking device, looking for the girls. They find their location and go inside the cave, but the members are not there anymore. In between the scene, a new clip emerges with the girls wearing white jumpsuits. The video ends with them walking underwater.

== Track listings ==
All tracks written by Channette Higgens, Channoah Higgens, Carsten Schack, and Kenneth Karlin.

CD single
No.	Title	Producer(s)	Length
1.	"You Don't Know" (Radio Edit)	Soulshock & Karlin	3:25
2.	"You Don't Know" (Ignorants Remix)	Soulshock & Karlin; Ignorants^{[a]}	4:41
3.	"You Don't Know" (Marvel & Eliy Remix)	Soulshock & Karlin; Marvel & Eliy^{[a]}	6:19
4.	"You Don't Know" (Ignorants Remix Instrumental)	Soulshock & Karlin; Ignorants^{[a]}	5:16

Notes

- ^{^[a]} denotes additional producer(s)

== Credits and personnel ==
Credits lifted from the liner notes of 702.

- Craig B. – guitar
- Irish Grinstead – vocalist
- Misha Grinstead – vocalist
- Channette Higgens – writer
- Channoah Higgens – writer
- Kenneth Karlin – instruments, producer, writer
- Manny Marroquin – mixing engineer
- Bill Molina – recording engineer
- Carsten Schack – instruments, producer, writer
- Meelah Williams – vocalist

== Charts ==
Weekly chart performance for "You Don't Know"
Chart (1999)	Peak position
Germany (GfK)	90
Netherlands (Dutch Top 40 Tipparade)	20
Netherlands (Single Top 100)	60
UK Singles (OCC)	36
UK Dance (OCC)	3
UK Hip Hop/R&B (OCC)	7
US Hot R&B/Hip-Hop Songs (Billboard)	50

== Release history ==
"You Don't Know" released history
Region	Date	Format(s)	Label(s)	Ref(s).
United States	August 3, 1999	Urban contemporary radio	Motown	
United Kingdom	November 15, 1999	12-inch vinyl; CD; cassette	Motown	
