= Make Me a Song =

Single by Kiley Dean
- Released: May 6, 2003
- Recorded: Westlake Studios
- Length: 3:16
- Label: Beatclub; Interscope
- Songwriter(s): Candice Nelson; Eric Seats; Kiley Dean; Rapture Stewart; Stephen Garrett; Tim Mosley; Walter Millsap III
- Producer(s): Timbaland

Kiley Dean singles chronology
"Make Me a Song" (2003)	"Who Will I Run To?" (2003)

"Make Me a Song" is a song by American singer Kiley Dean. It was written by Candice Nelson, Walter "Lil Walt" Millsap and Timbaland for her unreleased debut album Simple Girl, while production was helmed by the latter, with additional production by Scott Storch. A rhythmic and lyrical push and pull in which Dean describes her journey to the studio to find the perfect melody and beat, the song references "Rock the Boat" (2001) by American R&B singer Aaliyah. Released as Dean's debut single, "Make Me a Song" peaked at number 99 on the US Billboard Hot 100.

== Background ==
"Make Me a Song" was written by Candice Nelson, Walter "Lil Walt" Millsap and Timbaland for Kiley Dean's unreleased debut album Simple Girl. Production was overseen by the latter, while additional production was provided by Scott Storch. The song contains a sample from singer Aaliyah's 2001 song "Rock the Boat." Due to the inclusion of the sample, Stephen "Static Major" Garrett, Eric Seats, and Rapture Stewart are also credited as songwriters. It also references to Aaliyah's "Young Nation", Missy Elliott's "Get Ur Freak On", Tweet's "Call Me" and Bubba Sparxxx's "Hootnanny".

== Music video ==
In the music video for "Make Me a Song," Dean goes throughout her day in the studio. Two versions of the video were released: a TV version and an internet version. American photographer Matthew Rolston directed one version. Timbaland, Missy Elliott, Bubba Sparxxx and Brandy make cameo appearances in the video.

== Track listing ==
CD single
No.	Title	Length
1.	"Make Me a Song" (radio edit)	3:16
2.	"Make Me a Song" (instrumental)	4:06

== Credits and personnel ==
- Kiley Dean – backing vocals, lead vocals, writer
- Jimmy Douglass – recording engineer
- Aaron Fessel – recording engineer
- Brian "Big Bass" Gardner – mastering
- Stephen Garrett – writer
- Tim "Timbaland" Mosley – backing vocals, producer, writer
- Candice Nelson – writer
- Eric Seats – writer
- Rapture Stewart – writer
- Scott Storch – co-producer
- Anthony Zeller – recording engineer assistant

== Charts ==
Weekly chart performance for "Make Me a Song"
Chart (2003)	Peak position
US Billboard Hot 100	99
US Hot R&B/Hip-Hop Songs (Billboard)	54

== Release history ==
Release dates and formats for "Make Me a Song"
Region	Date	Format(s)	Label(s)	Ref.
United States	May 6, 2003	CD single	Beatclub; Interscope	
