= Where My Girls At? =

1999 single by 702

Single by 702

from the album 702
- B-side: "Make Time"; "Tell Your Girl"; "Gotta Leave"; "You'll Just Never Know"
- Released: April 5, 1999
- Genre: R&B; dance
- Length: 2:47
- Label: Motown
- Songwriters: Melissa Elliott; Eric Seats; Rapture Stewart
- Producers: Missy "Misdemeanor" Elliott; Eric Seats; Rapture Stewart

702 singles chronology
"Beep Me 911" (1998)	"Where My Girls At?" (1999)	"You Don't Know" (1999)

"Where My Girls At?" is a song by American R&B/pop group 702, released by Motown as the first single from their self-titled second album, on April 5, 1999, in the United States, followed by a United Kingdom release on July 26, 1999.

Often considered the group's signature song, "Where My Girls At?" was an international hit, peaking within the top 30 on the charts in many countries. The song spent thirty weeks in the top 20 on the Billboard Hot 100, giving the group their second top 10 US song; it was the No. 11 song of the year on the Billboard 1999 year-end chart. "Where My Girls At?" earned a Lady of Soul Award nomination for "Best R&B/Soul Single – Group, Band or Duo" in 1999.

The song was written as a female anthem. Elliott, who co-wrote the song, noted that "Where My Girls At?" was a song that she wanted female listeners to hear and relate to.

== Background ==
"Where My Girls At?" is an R&B and dance song, written by Missy Elliott, Eric Seats, and Rapture Stewart. Elliott initially offered the song to R&B group TLC during the recording of their third studio album, FanMail (1999). While Lisa Lopes of TLC voted to record the song, her groupmates rejected the song. In a Billboard interview, Elliott recalled "Lisa ("Left Eye" Lopes) really wanted it, she really wanted that record, but I guess, if it's two against one (what can you do?)". Lopes then tried to secure the song for Blaque, a female group signed to Lopes' Left Eye Productions. The song was eventually recorded by 702 with Meelah Williams performing the lead vocals.

The song became a female anthem due to its lyrics and celebration of women. Elliott recounted "It's almost like church — when you go to church, pastor is saying something (and you're) like, 'I swear up and down that message is for me.' I wanted to create something women could feel like, 'I could relate to this record.'" Group member Meelah Williams addressed critics that questioned if the song was really a female anthem or not. Williams stated, "You really have to listen. What it is, we're asking, 'Where are my true girlfriends that wouldn't do that to me, that would have my back and wouldn't stab me in the back?' So that's basically the purpose of the song, to let girls know that we're down for each other and we're all one."

== Music video ==
The music video for "Where My Girls At?" was directed by Bille Woodruff. The video starts outside an apartment complex, zooming in to a window where the members of 702 are walking down a brutalist-styled corridor wearing all-black leather attire. Behind them is a group of men wearing the same color, later standing against the wall while the ladies walk past them during the chorus. After the first chorus, the group members are all in different Y2K styled settings. Kameelah is seen in a chrome, light blue room wearing a dark grey blazer with digital signs reading the song's title behind her. LeMisha is seen wearing all black and donning a white tiger-printed cowboy hat in a red and orange colored room with a pyrotechnic behind her. Irish is in a blue cafe area decorated with futuristic furniture and textures wearing an all silver gown with fur accents. Following the bridge, the ladies are now in a big brutalist-styled room, each standing on top of platforms. They are all wearing black and silver polka-dotted outfits as background dancers surround them donning red from head to toe.

The video first premiered on BET on the week ending March 21, 1999. It later began airing on The Box and MTV on the weeks ending March 28, 1999, and April 18, 1999, respectively.

== Live performances ==
The song was performed during several televised shows including Showtime at the Apollo and Soul Train. In June 1999, 702 performed the song on the British TV chart show Top of the Pops, which aired on BBC One in the United Kingdom.

In May 2023, 702 performed "Where My Girls At?" in tribute to Missy Elliott at the Black Music Honors. The performance was their first televised performance as duo, without member Irish Grinstead who was on medical leave.

== Legacy ==
"Where My Girls At?" (1999) was ranked number 46 on Billboard's list of "100 Greatest Girl Group Songs of All Time", ranked number 72 on their "The 99 Greatest Songs of 1999" list, and was also included on their "Greatest of All Time Top Songs of the 90s" list at number 70.

=== Accolades ===
Year	Publisher	Country	Accolade	Rank
2017	Billboard	United States	"100 Greatest Girl Group Songs of All Time"	46
2019	Billboard	United States	"Billboard's Greatest of All Time Top Songs of the 90s"	70
2020	Billboard	United States	"The 99 Greatest Songs of 1999"	72
2021	BuzzFeed	United States	"The 50 Best '90s Songs of Summer"	37

== Track listings ==
US CD

1. "Where My Girls At?" (radio edit) – 2:47
2. "Where My Girls At?" (instrumental) – 4:02
3. "Make Time" (snippet) – 1:06
4. "Tell Your Girl" (snippet) – 1:03
5. "Gotta Leave" (snippet) – 1:13
6. "You'll Just Never Know" (snippet) – 1:11

US 12-inch vinyl

A1. "Where My Girls At?" (radio edit) – 2:47
A2. "Where My Girls At?" (instrumental) – 4:02
B1. "Where My Girls At?" (radio edit) – 2:47
B2. "Where My Girls At?" (TV track) – 4:02

UK 12-inch vinyl

A1. "Where My Girls At?" (album version) – 2:47
A2. "Where My Girls At?" (Allstar remix) – 3:40
B1. "Where My Girls At?" (Fanatic remix) – 3:44
B2. "Where My Girls At?" (Fanatic Rock mix) – 3:45

European CD

1. "Where My Girls At?" (Allstar remix) – 3:40
2. "Where My Girls At?" (Fanatic remix) – 3:44

== Chart performance ==
"Where My Girls At?" peaked at No. 4 on the Billboard Hot 100 on June 19, 1999. It peaked at No. 3 on the Hot R&B/Hip-Hop Songs charts and at No. 1 on the Rhythmic Top 40 chart. The single remained in the Top 20 on the Billboard Hot 100 chart for more than 30 weeks.

=== Weekly charts ===
Chart (1999–2000)	Peak position
Australia (ARIA)	65
Belgium (Ultratip Bubbling Under Flanders)	4
Canada (Nielsen SoundScan)	5
Canada CHR (Nielsen BDS)	11
Canada Dance/Urban (RPM)	27
Europe (European Hot 100 Singles)	55
France (SNEP)	83
Germany (GfK)	21
Netherlands (Dutch Top 40)	14
Netherlands (Single Top 100)	17
New Zealand (Recorded Music NZ)	22
Scottish Singles Sales (Official Charts)	66
Sweden (Sverigetopplistan)	43
Switzerland (Schweizer Hitparade)	25
UK Singles (Official Charts)	22
UK Dance (Official Charts)	11
UK Hip Hop/R&B (Official Charts)	2
US Billboard Hot 100 (Billboard)	4
US Hot R&B Singles & Tracks (Billboard)	3
US Mainstream Top 40 (Billboard)	10
US Rhythmic Top 40 (Billboard)	1

=== Year-end charts ===
Chart (1999)	Position
Netherlands (Dutch Top 40)	85
UK Urban (Music Week)	6
US Billboard Hot 100	11
US Hot R&B/Hip-Hop Singles & Tracks (Billboard)	6
US Mainstream Top 40 (Billboard)	40
US Rhythmic Top 40 (Billboard)	2

Chart (2000)	Position
US Mainstream Top 40 (Billboard)	87
US Rhythmic Top 40 (Billboard)	63

== Certifications ==
Region	Certification	Certified units/sales
New Zealand (RMNZ)	Gold	15,000^{‡}
United States (RIAA)	Gold	600,000
^{‡} Sales+streaming figures based on certification alone.

== Release history ==
Region	Date	Format(s)	Label(s)	Ref(s).
United States	April 5, 1999	Rhythmic contemporary radio; urban contemporary radio	Motown	
United States	April 27, 1999	12-inch vinyl; CD	Motown	
Canada	May 18, 1999	CD	Motown	
United Kingdom	July 26, 1999	12-inch vinyl; CD; cassette	Motown	
