= Kiley Dean =

American contemporary R&B singer

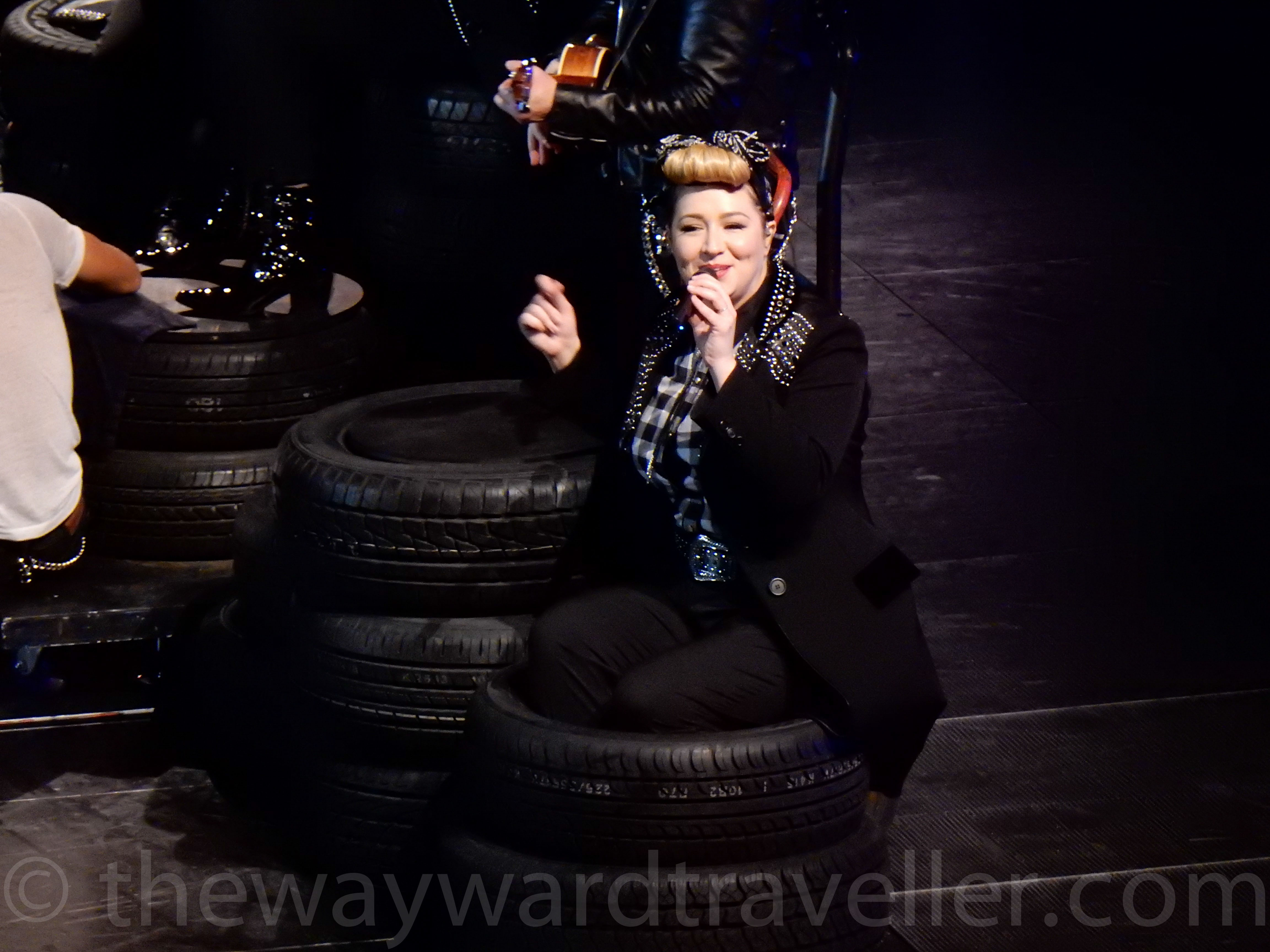
- Dean as performing on Madonna's Rebel Heart Tour in 2015

Background information
- Born: Kiley Dean Bowlin; April 12, 1982 (age 44); Alma, Arkansas, U.S.
- Origin: Orlando, Florida, U.S.
- Occupation: Singer-songwriter
- Years active: 2000–present
- Labels: Music World; Interscope; Beat Club
- Website: kileydean.net

Kiley Dean Bowlin (born April 12, 1982) is an American singer. Born and raised in Alma, Arkansas, she moved to Orlando, Florida with her parents at the age of seven. She grew up singing in school and church, which led her to singing back-up for Britney Spears' tours, "...Baby One More Time" and "Oops!... I Did It Again" as well as Madonna's tours, "Sticky & Sweet", "MDNA" and "Rebel Heart."

She signed to record producer Timbaland's Beat Club Records, an imprint of Interscope Records in 2002, and released her debut single, "Make Me a Song" the following year. The song, produced by Timbaland, underperformed at number 99 on the Billboard Hot 100, and Bowlin briefly signed with Mathew Knowles' Music World Entertainment in 2007 before becoming an independent artist.

== Career ==
In 2002, she was signed to Timbaland's short-lived Beat Club Records, releasing two singles before her Timbaland-produced debut, Simple Girl, planned to be released on July 15, 2003, was shelved. In 2005, she set work on her second album under the name 'Blue Eyes' and released a single "Lookin' For Love" to radio. Her second studio album Changes was set to be released in 2006, preceded by the single "Who I Am," which was sent out to radio.

The following year, she signed with Mathew Knowles' Music World Entertainment label in 2007. She was set to release her album "Changes" on the label, but left soon after six months.

In 2008, she joined pop singer Madonna on her Sticky & Sweet Tour as a backup vocalist, replacing Madonna's long-time backing singer Donna De Lory, who was pregnant at the time and unable to tour. In 2010, she released her album "Changes" digitally on the ReverbNation store for a limited time. Later that year, she recorded a couple of remixes that was made available on YouTube and her SoundCloud accounts.

She joined the New Kids On The Block and Matthew Morrison tours in 2011, singing backup for them. In 2022, she sang backup for Madonna. She performed on her MDNA Tour and Rebel Heart Tour runs.

In 2015, she launched a Kickstarter campaign to fund her Scream EP, which successfully met its goal in February. In July, she premiered the EP's first single and music video "Lockdown" to her backers, with the digital release (and YouTube/VEVO) in August. On September 21, the EP was made available to her backers, with a digital release set in the next following weeks.

== Personal life ==
She married musician Mason McSpadden on October 26, 2015.

In a blog post in March 2018, she announced she & her husband welcomed their first child Sullivan Sue McSpadden in May 2017.

== Discography ==
=== Extended plays ===
List of extended plays
Title	Album details
Sream	Released: April 12, 2015; Label: Kiley Dean Music; Formats: Digital download
Overcome	Released: July 23, 2021; Label: Kiley Dean Music; Formats: Digital download
Overcome Live	Released: April 12, 2022; Label: Kiley Dean Music; Formats: Digital download

=== Singles ===
List of singles as lead artist, with selected chart positions, showing year released and album
Title	Year	Peak chart positions				Albums
Title	Year	US	US R&B	US Sales	US R&B Sales	Albums
"Make Me a Song"	2003	99	54	—	—	Non-album single
"Who Will I Run to?"	2003	—	—	64	73	Non-album single
"Who I Am"	2007	—	—	—	—	Non-album single
"Lockdown"	2015	—	—	—	—	Scream
"Scream"	2015	—	—	—	—	Scream
"Backseat"	2015	—	—	—	—	Scream
"A Million Miles"	2016	—	—	—	—	Scream
"Cleaning Out My Closet"	2020	—	—	—	—	Non-album single
"Congratulations"	2020	—	—	—	—	Non-album single
"Rain"	2020	—	—	—	—	Non-album single
"—" denotes the single failed to chart or was not released

=== Guest appearances ===
- DJ Enuff & Timbaland Present Bubba Sparxxx & The Muddkatz — New South: The Album B4 the Album (2003)

17. "Gun Line" featuring Petey Pablo & Kiley Dean
19. "Country Till I Die" featuring Kiley Dean

- Bubba Sparxxx — Deliverance (2003)

05. "Nowhere" featuring Kiley Dean

- Timbaland — The World Is Ours (2004)

00. "The World Is Ours" featuring Missy Elliott, Justin Timberlake, Bubba Sparxxx & Kiley Dean

- Shelby Norman

"After All"
"I Will"

- Unity: The Official Athens 2004 Olympic Games Album (2004)

03. "By Your Side" - Timbaland, Kiley Dean & Hikaru Utada

- Luis Oliart — Luis Oliart EP (2007)

03. "Jesus Comin' Down The Road" featuring Kiley Dean

- Randy Jackson — Randy Jackson's Music Club: Volume One (2008)

03. "What Am I So Afraid Of" with Trisha Covington, Keke Wyatt & Kiley Dean

- Flo Rida — Mail On Sunday (2008)

03. "Elevator" featuring Timbaland

- Luis Oliart & John Carta (2010)

"How Do I Know" featuring Kiley Dean

- Fabian Buch — Hello Hello (2010)

11. "Runaway"

=== Albums ===
- 2003: Simple Girl (Unreleased)

01. "Blessed (Intro)"
02. "Cross The Line"
03. "Make Me A Song"
04. "No"
05. "Just Like That"
06. "Kiss Me Like That"
07. "Keep It Movin'"
08. "America"
09. "War Song"
10. "Simple Girl"
11. "As Days Gone By"
12. "Better Than The Day"
13. "Stay Away From My Boyfriend"
14. "Busy"
15. "Confused"
16. "I Know (Outro)"
17. "Lovin' Me"
18. "Should I"

- 2006: Changes (Unreleased)
- 2006: Who I Am [EP] (Digital)

01. "Who I Am"
02. "Who I Am (Instrumental)"
03. "Who I Am (Broken English Remix)"
04. "Who I Am (MK Remix)"
05. "Crazy On You"

- 2010: Changes (Digital)

01. "Dangerous"
02. "Be Alone"
03. "Changes"
04. "Just Like That"
05. "Escape"
06. "Tug Of War"
07. "Who I Am"
08. "Stay Away From My Boyfriend"
09. "Over"
10. "Escape (Acoustic)"

- 2010: Remixes. (Digital)

01. "Say Something"
02. "Headcase (Ayo Technology)"
03. "I Wanna Rock"
04. "OMG"
05. "My Chick Bad"
06. "Lil Freak"
07. "Nothing On You"
08. "Money To Blow"
09. "Set Me Free"
10. "Go Back"

=== Unreleased/Leaked ===
- Simple Girl era

"By Your Side" (solo version)
"My Own"
"Simple Girl" (w/o intro)
"Who Will I Run To" (extended version)

- Changes era

"Are You Feeling Me?"
"Changes"
"Convince Me"
"Goodbye"
"Gotta Clue"
"Just A Little"
"Let You Know"
"Never Felt So Good"
"Oh No"
"On This Day"
"Rain"
"So Caught Up"
"Sometimes It Hurts"
"This Heart Is Yours"
"We All Need Love"
