= Sharon Chan (journalist) =

American journalist and news executive

Sharon Pian Chan is an American journalist and news executive serving as vice president of philanthropy at The New York Times. She was president of the Asian American Journalists Association from 2009 to 2010. From 2017 to 2019, at The Seattle Times she was Vice President of Innovation, Product and Development.
