= Wendy Moten discography =

- Studio albums: 6
- Extended plays: 1
- Singles: 11

The discography of Wendy Moten, an American singer, consists of six studio albums (including one holiday album), an extended play, and eleven singles.

== Studio albums ==
List of studio albums, with selected chart positions
Title	Album details	Peak chart positions	
Title	Album details	JPN	UK
Wendy Moten	Released: 1992; Label: EMI; Formats: CD	—	42
Time for Change	Released: 1995; Label: EMI; Formats: CD	18	―
Life's What You Make It	Released: 1996; Label: I.R.S.; Formats: CD	67	—
Tis the Season	Released: September 29, 2009; Label: I.L.S.; Formats: Digital release	—	—
Timeless – Wendy Moten sings Richard Whiting	Released: May 27, 2014; Label: Woodward Avenue; Formats: CD, digital release	—	—
I've Got You Covered	Released: February 12, 2020; Label: Radio Eye Music; Formats: CD, digital release	—	—
"—" denotes releases that did not chart

== Extended play ==
Title	EP details
Christmas Time	Released: 1995; Label: Toshibi-EMI; Formats: CD

== Singles ==
=== As main artist ===
List of singles, with selected chart positions, showing year released and album name
Title	Year	Peak chart positions						Album
Title	Year	US	US R&B	US AC	AUS	UK	JPN	Album
"Step by Step"	1992	—	66	—	—	—	—	Wendy Moten
"Come In Out of the Rain"	1992	55	67	5	52	8	1	Wendy Moten
"So Close to Love"	1994	—	—	—	—	35	—	Wendy Moten
"Your Love Is All I Know"	1994	—	—	—	—	—	2	Time for Change
"Change of Heart"	1995	—	—	—	—	—	1	Time for Change
"Life's What You Make It"	1996	—	—	—	—	—	1	Life's What You Make It
"Can't We Get Along"	2020	—	—	—	—	—	—	Non-album single
"Love Is a Painful Thing"	2022	—	—	—	—	—	—	Non-album single
"As"	2022	—	—	—	—	—	—	Non-album single

=== Promotional singles ===
List of promotional singles, showing year released and album name
Title	Year	Album
"Make This Love Last"	1992	Wendy Moten
"Whatever You Imagine"	1994	The Pagemaster OST
"Christmas Time"	1995	Christmas Time
"When The World Is Running Down"	1996	Life's What You Make It
"Feel the World Dancing"	2000	Sounds of a Better World – Small Voices Calling…

== Other appearances ==
Title	Year	Album	Artist(s)	Note(s)
"Let Me Make Love to You"	1993	You Make It Easy	Keith Washington; Letitia Body	Moten participated in this song as a background vocalist.
"Woman to Woman"	1994	Duets	Kiyomi Suzuki	
"Could It Be I'm Falling in Love"	1995	Reachin' Back	Regina Belle	Moten participated in these songs as a background vocalist.
"You Make Me Feel Brand New"	1995	Reachin' Back	Regina Belle	Moten participated in these songs as a background vocalist.
"I'll Be Around"	1995	Reachin' Back	Regina Belle	Moten participated in these songs as a background vocalist.
"Why Goodbye"	1995	graffiti	Keizo Nakanishi	
"All I Do"	1998	For You	Kirk Whalum	
"My Gift Is You (Original Mix)"	1999	My Gift Is You (CD Single)	Peabo Bryson	
"My Gift Is You (T.V. Track with Wendy)"	1999	My Gift Is You (CD Single)	Peabo Bryson	
"Real Love"	2000	Unconditional	Kirk Whalum	
"No Love to Be Found"	2000	Blue Obsession	Michael McDonald	
"Far Away"	2001	Reach For The Sky	Alexander Zonjic	
"That's Why I Love You So"	2001	Along For The Ride	John Mayall	
"Testify"	2001	Along For The Ride	John Mayall	
"I Still Believe"	2001	Deep Into It	Larry Carlton	
"I Loved You In Memphis"	2003	Into My Soul	Kirk Whalum	
"Don't Go"	2004	Stay With Me	Michael Lington	
"Side Steppin'"	2005	The City	Paul Brown	
"Away in a Manger"	2012	A Time For Hope	Roger Ryan	Featuring Wendy Moten
"Simply Beautiful"	2014	Simply Beautiful (Single)	Kevin Whalum	
"Love N Trust"	2014	Truth B Told	Paul Brown	
"The Head That Wears the Crown"	2014	Good Road to Follow	John Oates	Featuring Jerry Douglas and Wendy Moten
"Who Will the Next Fool Be"	2014	The Memphis Project	Dual Drive	
"Remember"	2014	Remember (Single)	Unite Against Bullying	Featuring Kris Thomas, Karina Iglesias, Wendy Moten, Shayne Leighton, Nick Murphy, Linzy Rose, Justin Merrick, Sarah Simmons and Kojo Hayes
"Southern Boyz & Girlz Be Rockn"	2015	Southern Boyz & Girlz Be Rockn (Single)	Country Soul	Featuring Clyde Avant, Frank Smith and Wendy Moten
"Don't Let Go"	2015	Celebrate Your Life	Joey Melotti	Featuring Tony Davich and Wendy Moten
"Doin’ What You Do"	2017	Prick of the Litter	Delbert McClinton	Moten participated in this song as a background vocalist.
"Rain"	2017	Rain (Single)	Martin Verdi	Featuring Wendy Moten and Mark Dearing
"We Can Work It Out"	2017	Compassion 3-1-1	Monument of Love Baptist Church	Featuring Wendy Moten
"Never Give Up"	2017	Compassion 3-1-1	Monument of Love Baptist Church	Featuring Wendy Moten
"Are You Lonely for Me Baby?"	2018	Silver & Stone	Mike Farris	Moten participated in this song as a background vocalist.
"Can I Get a Witness?"	2018	Silver & Stone	Mike Farris	Moten participated in this song as a background vocalist.
"Golden Wings"	2018	Silver & Stone	Mike Farris	Moten participated in this song as a background vocalist.
"Let Me Love You Baby"	2018	Silver & Stone	Mike Farris	Moten participated in this song as a background vocalist.
"Hope She'll Be Happier"	2018	Silver & Stone	Mike Farris	Moten participated in this song as a background vocalist.
"Snap Your Fingers"	2018	Silver & Stone	Mike Farris	Moten participated in this song as a background vocalist.
"Breathless"	2018	Silver & Stone	Mike Farris	Moten participated in this song as a background vocalist.
"Miss Somebody"	2018	Silver & Stone	Mike Farris	Moten participated in this song as a background vocalist.
"When Mavis Sings"	2018	Silver & Stone	Mike Farris	Moten participated in this song as a background vocalist.
"Movin' Me"	2018	Silver & Stone	Mike Farris	Moten participated in this song as a background vocalist.
"Torn Down"	2021	Traveler’s Blues	Blues Traveler	Featuring Wendy Moten
"Say It for You"	2022	Jacob	Ty Herndon	Featuring Wendy Moten
"You Can't Always Get What You Want"	2022	Let It Bleed Revisited - An Ovation from Nashville	The Rock House All Stars	Featuring Wendy Moten and SaRachel

== Other recorded songs ==
Title	Year	Album	Note(s)
"All I Want to Be Is Understood"	1993	March On	
"The Way That You Love Me"	1994	One Life To Live (The Best of Love): Original Songs From The Daytime Drama	
"Whatever You Imagine"	1994	The Pagemaster: Original Motion Picture Soundtrack	Also released in the European edition of Moten's album "Time for Change"
"Santa Claus Is Coming to Town"	1995	The Sounds of Starry Nights	
"Still It's You"	1996	Songbook	A duet with Phil Perry and the theme song for the movie Mr. Wonderful. It was first released in Carole Bayer Sager's album.
"Feel The World Dancing"	1999	Sounds of A Better World - Small Voices Calling…	
"This Feeling I Have Is Love"	2003	Take My Hand: Music For Weddings	
"Tired (As Heard On The Simpsons)"	2008	Big Networks, Big Music, Vol. 4	
"The River (As Heard On Medium)"	2008	Big Networks, Big Music, Vol. 9	A duet with Scat Springs.
"In My Eyes"	2010	—	Sheila Houston featuring Wendy Moten
"Without You"	2012	—	Michael J. Thomas featuring Wendy Moten
"True Love"	2018	Muscle Shoals: Small Town, Big Sound	A duet with Vince Gill.
"We Can Work It Out"			This song is a demo.
"Someday"			A duet with J.L. Jones.

== Music videos ==
Year	Song title	Director(s)
1992	"Step by Step"	―
1994	"Come In Out of the Rain"	―
1994	"So Close to Love"	―
