= TIS =

TIS, Tis or 'Tis may refer to:

== Companies/Organisations ==
- TIS Productions, a Colombian television production company commonly called TIS and previously known as Fox TeleColombia and TeleColombia
- Taporoporo'anga Ipukarea Society, an environmental NGO based in the Cook Islands
- Transparency International Slovakia, an anti-corruption non-governmental organization
- Trusted Information Systems, a former computer security research and development company
- The International School of Macao, a Canadian international school in Macao

== Places ==
- Tis (Havlíčkův Brod District), a municipality and village in the Czech Republic
- Tis u Blatna, a municipality and village in the Czech Republic
- Tis, a village and part of Janov (Rychnov nad Kněžnou District) in the Czech Republic
- Tis, Iran, a village

== Other uses ==
- Polikarpov TIS, Soviet prototype heavy fighter
- Tin Shui Wai station (MTR station code TIS), Hong Kong
- Travelers' information station, providing information by radio to motorists
- Truth in sentencing, policies on criminal sentencing
- 'Tis, a 1999 memoir by Frank McCourt
- Tis, In molecular biology and genetics translation initiation site
- Triisopropylsilane, or TIS, a hydrosilane
- Technological innovation system
- Tensilica Instruction Extension, a proprietary language for customizing Tensilica's Xtensa processors

== See also ==
- 'Tis the Season (disambiguation)
