= Sheryn Regis =

Filipino singer (born 1980)

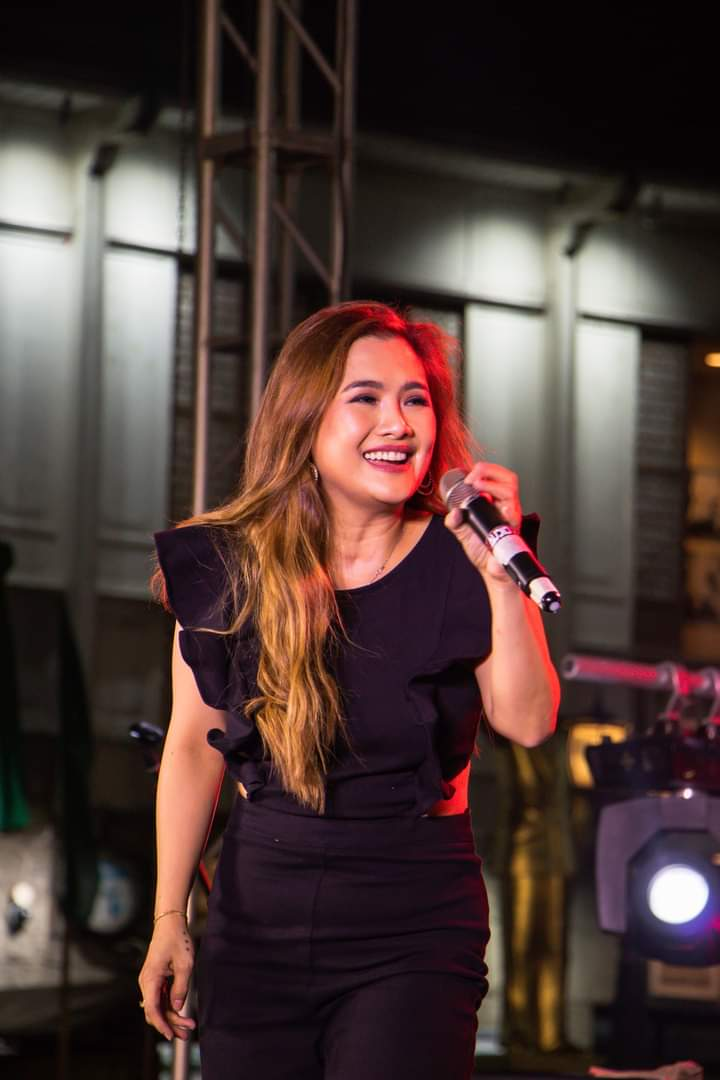
- Regis in 2023
- Born: Sheryn Mae Poncardas Regis; November 26, 1980 (age 45); Carcar, Cebu, Philippines
- Occupations: Singer; songwriter; host; actress
- Children: 1
- Musical career
- Genres: P-pop; OPM
- Years active: 2003–present
- Label: Star Records (2003–present)

Sheryn Mae Poncardas Regis (Tagalog: [ˈrɛhis]; born November 26, 1980) is a Filipino singer and songwriter. She rose to fame after finishing as first runner-up of the television talent show Star in a Million in 2003. Dubbed as the "Crystal Voice of Asia," she is best known for singing the theme songs for several hit television series on ABS-CBN, including Marina (2004), Krystala (2005) and Kampanerang Kuba (2005).

Regis is popularly known as a 'power belter,' noted for her belting range and technical ability. With a career spanning 20 years in entertainment, she has since earned four multi-platinum albums and five gold records to her credit. In 2004, she placed second in one of Asia's most renowned music festivals since 1990, Voice of Asia. Among her many accolades include the Asian Star Entertainment Award for "Asian Best Female Performing Artist" and an Awit Award for "Favorite Female Recording Artist."

== Early life ==
Sheryn Mae Poncardas Regis was born in Carcar, Cebu, to Bernardo and Daisy Regis. She is the eldest of three children, with brothers Elton and Joseph. Sheryn's mother guided her in singing, and at the age of two, she was able to hum and sing simple tunes. Her first and favorite contest piece was Kuh Ledesma's "Dito Ba?" ("Is it Here?") which she learned at age 5. At seven, Regis started joining amateur singing contests. Her winnings were used to buy Shirley Bassey's cassette tapes for her next contest piece. She won her first grand prize at age 8 after singing Tillie Moreno's "Saan Ako Nagkamali" ("Where Did I Go Wrong").

Aside from singing in contests, Regis earned income by offering voice lessons to children while in high school. She finished her B.S. Secondary Education degree with a major in English at Cebu Normal University. It was during her college years that she was exposed to theater acting and chorale singing which eventually gave her the chance to travel and perform for Filipino communities in Canada and in the USA. Veteran actors Leo Martinez and Gina Alajar served as her workshop mentors. In 1999, she was awarded "Best Interpreter" at the Cebu Metro Pop Music Festival (a songwriting festival), when she sang "Among Gabayan" (Our Guide), a Cebuano tribute song to Cebu's patron Sto. Niño written by Fr. Jed Ponce Billones. Their entry was also hailed as the Grand Prize winner.

Regis worked as a lounge singer at the Cebu Plaza Hotel where she met Earl Echiverri. They married in 2002 and had their daughter Lourdes the following year.

Regis came out as a lesbian in 2021, revealing on social media that she is in a relationship with her partner Mel De Guia . She had earlier come out to her husband Earl Echiverri and their daughter, who both accepted and supported her. Though separated, they remain married at the request of their daughter and are on good terms.

== Career ==
=== Early career and Star in a Million ===
Regis first appeared in the "Sing-Eat" segment of Eat Bulaga! in 2002 where she became a grand finalist.

In 2003, Regis secured a place as grand finalist in ABS-CBN's television reality singing competition Star in a Million after advancing from the elimination rounds with Teresa Garcia. Dubbed as the "Power Belter" because of her effortless high notes, Regis was a judge favorite and was the only finalist to never place in the bottom two during the entire season. She placed consistently in the top performances every week, eventually reaching the Grand Champion Night on January 3, 2004, with Marinel Santos and Erik Santos. Regis won the Texter's Choice Award but placed only as a runner-up after singing Wendy Moten's Come in Out of the Rain. Disheartened by not winning the 1-million peso and house and lot prizes, Regis returned to Cebu thinking she would have to start over again, but was instead offered a recording contract with Star Records and released a recording of Come in Out of the Rain, which became an instant hit and Regis' signature song.

Episode	Song	Artist	Score	Rank/Status
GRAND FINALS	"Come In Out of the Rain"	Wendy Moten	9.50	1st Runner-up
Top 4	"Let's Get Loud"	Jennifer Lopez	9.60	1st Place
Top 4	"Run To You"	Whitney Houston	9.73	1st Place
Top 5	"It's Christmas (All Over The World)"	Sheena Easton	9.50	1st Place
Top 6	"Go the Distance"	Michael Bolton	9.60	1st Place
Top 7	"I Have Nothing"	Whitney Houston	9.60	1st Place
Top 8	"On The Wings Of Love"	Jeffrey Osborne	9.33	1st Place
Top 9	"Bituing Walang Ningning"	Sharon Cuneta	9.00	1st Place
Top 10	"Through the Fire"	Chaka Khan	9.43	1st Place

=== 2003–2004: Come in Out of the Rain, rise to prominence ===
After losing to Erik Santos, the management of ABS-CBN and Star Music offer her a recording contract. Even before its album's release, "Come In Out of the Rain" became a radio hit in the Philippines. It stayed for 12 consecutive weeks as number one on Myx OPM Countdown and ranked no. 4 in 2004 MYX HIT CHART YEAR-END TOP 20 SONGS. Regis also released other singles like Maybe (cover version of Peabo Bryson and Regina Belle) and Kailan Kaya, written by Raul Mitra and Cacai Velasquez which served as theme song of ABS-CBN's primetime fantaserye Marina.

Regis was chosen by songwriter Vehnee Saturno to represent the Philippines in Voice of Asia in Kazakhstan where she sang "Isang Lahi", "Sana'y 'Di Pangarap", "Now More Than Ever" and Saturno's original song "Follow your Dream". She became the third Filipino to win the 2 Prize Silver Trophy after Jed Madela and Arnee Hidalgo. Upon returning, Regis was given a title, Crystal Voice of Asia by the local media, a common tradition among Filipino singers. She hosted in noontime show Masayang Tanghali Bayan/MTB Ang Saya Saya and mainstay of ASAP which created a hit segment ASAP Champions together with Sarah Geronimo, Erik Santos, Mark Bautista.

In May 2004, Regis officially launched her debut album under Star Records entitled Come In Out of the Rain, produced by Jonathan Manalo. The album included her previous pieces Follow Your Dream and Among Gabayan. The album received Platinum Record Award by PARI having sold over 40,000 copies.

She had her first concert, "Higher Note," at the Music Museum, followed by several concerts in the Philippines and abroad.

=== 2005: What I Do Best, continuing success ===
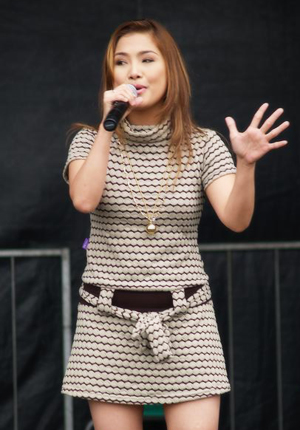
Regis performing in the UK in 2007

She hosted in daily show M.R.S. (Most Requested Show) with Amy Perez, Roderick Paulate and Toni Gonzaga.Regis was awarded by the 21st Year-Ender Excellence Awards as Top Entertainer International Achievement Awardee and Best Female Performer in Asia Pacific and highly nominated in the 18th Awit Awards. She was also nominated in four other categories for her debut album, Best Inspirational Song ("Follow Your Dream"), Best Regional Recording ("Among Gabayan"), Best Song Written for Movie/TV/Stage Play ("Kailan Kaya") and Best Concert Performer in an Intimate Venue Female.

In July 2005, Sheryn launched her second album, "What I Do Best".

She also sang Sabihin Mo Sa Akin, the theme from Kampanerang Kuba.

After the success of her carrier single, she launched her second single by late 2005, Hindi Ko Kayang Iwan Ka. It was chosen as the 'love theme song' of ABS-CBN's television series, Gulong ng Palad. Aside from this, her love song, Sa Piling Mo was aired as a wedding song on the same show.

By April 2006, she released the last single from her second album, Dahil Nagmamahal and was chosen as a theme song of Bernadette Sembrano's Nagmamahal, Kapamilya.

Two songs from this album received recognition. The carrier single, What I do Best, won as Best Song Performed by a Female Artist given by iFM Pinoy Music Awards. Hindi Ko Kayang Iwan Ka, which is actually the most popular song from this album received a prestigious award. It was named by S Magazine as song of the year. At that time, she was dubbed the Crystal Voice of Asia, a title contested by the camp of another Filipino singer Mari Nallos, who held the title much earlier when she was under contract with Star Records.

What I do Best received Gold Record Award by PARI sold over 25,000 copies.

=== The Modern Jukebox Collection ===
In October 2006, Sheryn began recording for her third album under Star Records. The album was set to release on November 20, 2006. Her first single off the album was a cover of a Leah Navarro original, Ang Pag-Ibig Kong Ito.

Sheryn's remake of Joey Albert's I Remember the Boy was chosen as Jasmine's Theme Song for ABS-CBN's teleserye featuring Kim Chiu and Gerald Anderson, Sana Maulit Muli. She also sang the theme song of the primetime teleserye, Maria Flordeluna topbilled by Eliza Pineda. She also revived the popular Kuh Ledesma hit Dito Ba from the Hit Afternoon Drama Prinsesa ng Banyera which served as the theme song.

She later launched her second official single from the album, a song penned by Ricky Sanchez, Ang Lahat Para Sa 'Yo (later used as a theme song for El Cuerpo), while her self-composition, Pusong Lito, enjoyed frequent airplay in provincial radio stations and was able to reach the Number 1 spot in the MOR Top Hits of MOR Cebu 97.1 Lupig Sila. It was chosen as the theme song of ABS-CBN TV-3 Cebu's Visayan drama series Summer Sunshine, aired during summer season.

Early 2008, Sheryn released her third and final single from the album, Sayang na Sayang, a cover of the Manilyn Reynes original. By end of February, the music video for the single was shot with her Love Spell costar and Be Bench finalist, John James Uy, as the leading man.

=== Starting Over Again ===
During the release of her third single from her jukebox album, Sheryn started hinting the public of an upcoming fourth album with a tentative June release. It was also during the planning stages of her fourth album that Sheryn became part of Star Magic, the talent management arm of her mother station, ABS-CBN.

The album, aptly titled Starting Over Again, released its first single bearing the same title, which is based on the Natalie Cole version (the song was originally sung by Dionne Warwick with different lyrics), during the final week of May. The album contains seven revivals and three originals. Sheryn, along with her husband, penned an English original, My Heart Beats for You. Anabelle Regalado, managing director of Star Records, also contributed a Tagalog original, Sana Nandito Ka. Vehnee Saturno, who is also one of the composers on the album with his song Patunayan Mo, was also its producer. This is the first time that one of Sheryn's albums was produced by somebody other than producer Jonathan Manalo.

The carrier of her fourth album was chosen as an official theme song of Korean drama, Three Dads with One Mommy.

=== 2020s ===
In 2020, Sheryn took on a new challenge by collaborating with the rock band Hey Moonshine. They recorded and released a single entitled "Ilang Beses" under Viva Records. This was the first time Sheryn recorded a song in this genre.

== Artistry ==
=== Voice and timbre ===
Regis is a soprano and is often praised for her range and technical ability. She possesses a four-octave vocal range, noted for her "distinctive tone and timbre" and "florid blend of breathy riffing and resonant belting."

=== Musical influences ===
Sheryn has cited Whitney Houston as her major influence and she grew up singing Houston Hits. She also cited Regine Velasquez and Lea Salonga as her musical influence in the Philippines. Some of her musical influence are Mariah Carey, Michael Jackson, Celine Dion, Aretha Franklin, Beyoncé, Kuh Ledesma, Lani Misalucha, and Jaya.

== Discography ==
=== Studio albums ===
Album	Detail	Songs
Come In Out of the Rain	May 2004 Star Records; Platinum Award (40,000 copies sold)	1. Come in Out of the Rain; 2. Sana'y Ingatan Mo; 3. We Could Be in Love; 4. Kailan Kaya; 5. Sana’y Di Pangarap; 6. Maybe; 7. Now More Than Ever; 8. Shoobee Doo Wop; 9. Follow Your Dream; 10. Among Gabayan
What I Do Best	July 2005 Star Records; Gold Award (15,000 copies sold)	1. What I Do Best; 2. Sa Piling Mo; 3. I Don't Want You to Go; 4. Now That I Have You; 5. Hindi Ko Kayang Iwan Ka; 6. Sabihin Mo Sa Akin; 7. When You Tell Me That You Love Me; 8. Dahil Nagmamahal; 9. If Ever I See You Again; 10. (Try It) On My Own
The Modern Jukebox Collection	November 2006 Star Records	1. Ang Pag-ibig Kong Ito; 2. Alam Mo Ba?; 3. Sayang na Sayang; 4. Bago Magbukas; 5. After All; 6. Bakit Iniwan Mo; 7. Ang Lahat Para Sa'yo; 8. 'Di Na Ba Babalik Pa?; 9. I Remember the Boy; 10. Pusong Lito; 11. Bonus Track: Maria Flordeluna; Minus One: Ang Pag-ibig Kong Ito; Alam Mo Ba?; After All; I Remember the Boy; Pusong Lito; Sayang na Sayang
Starting Over Again	May 2008 Star Records	1. If I'm Not in Love; 2. Where Do Broken Hearts Go; 3. Always; 4. Starting Over Again; 5. Save the Best for Last; 6. For Your Eyes Only; 7. Patunayan Mo; 8. It Must Have Been Love; 9. Sana Nandito Ka; 10. My Heart Beats for You
She	September 2022 Star Records	1. Gusto Ko Nang Bumitaw; 2. Kung Pwede Lang; 3. Sabi Mo; 4. Simula ng Dulo; 5. Tulad ng Dati; 6. Posporo

=== Collaborations albums ===
Title	Artist/s	Sales Status
Star in a Million (Compilation)	Star in a Million Finalists	3xPlatinum (100,000 Copies)
Now That I Have You (OST)	Various Artists	Gold (15,000 Copies)
Krystala (OST)	Various Artists	
Nagmamahal Kapamilya (Compilation)	Various Artists	6xPlatimun (200,000 Copies)
Hotsilog: Hotdog Song's (Compilation)	ASAP Artists	2xPlatimun (60,000 Copies)
Maging Sino Ka Man (Compilation)	Various Artists	
Gary V 25 (Compilation)	Various Artists	Gold (15,000 Copies)

=== Theme songs ===
Sheryn is also prominently known for singing a lot of themesongs for ABS-CBN teleseryes.

- Now that I Have You – Now that I Have You Theme Song (with Erik Santos)
- Silver Swan – Silver Swan commercial
- Sabay Tayo Pilipinas – Station ID of ABS-CBN Regional Group
- Star Circle Quest – Star Circle Quest Theme Song (with Marinel Santos)
- Nginiiig! – Nginiiig! Theme Song (with Gloc 9)
- Kailan Kaya – Marina Theme Song
- Among Gabayan – Sinulog Festival
- Sabihin Mo Sa Akin – Kampanerang Kuba Theme Song
- Hindi Ko Kayang Iwan Ka – Gulong ng Palad Love Theme Song
- Sa Piling Mo – Gulong ng Palad Wedding Theme Song
- Dahil Nagmamahal – Nagmamahal, Kapamilya Theme Song
- Ang Pag-ibig Kong Ito – Your Song (Zanjoe Marudo and Nikki Gil) later Temptation of Wife Theme Song
- I Remember The Boy – Sana Maulit Muli (Jasmine and Travis) Theme Song
- Maria Flordeluna – Maria Flordeluna Theme Song
- Krystala – Krystala Theme Song
- Shoo Bee Doo Wop – Krystala Love Theme Song
- Pusong Lito – Summer Sunshine Theme Song
- Kailangan Ko’y Ikaw – Maging Sino Ka Man: Ang Pagbabalik Soundtrack
- Dito Ba – Prinsesa ng Banyera Theme Song
- Ang Lahat Para Sa ‘Yo – El Cuerpo del Deseo
- Sayang Na Sayang – Your Song (Matt Evans and Melissa Ricks) Theme Song
- Starting Over Again – Three Dads with One Mommy Theme Song
- Always – Nasaan Ka Maruja? Soundtrack
- Eden Cheese Jingle – Eden Cheese commercial
- Pangako Sa’yo - Paano ang Pangako? Soundtrack

== Philanthropy and other ventures ==
=== The Little Voice Foundation ===
Regis launched The Little Voice Foundation during Sheryn's birthday concert on November 26, 2005, at the SM Megamall Cinema 10. It aims is to provide education to poor children between 5–12.She also engaged in clothing line business which located in different malls in the Philippines. Some of earnings were put on her business.

=== Media appearances ===
Regis has become part of different variety shows, Most Requested Show and ASAP.

Regis hosted the now-defunct Search for the Star in a Million Season 2 with fellow champs Erik, Rachelle Ann, and Mark. She is also the host of Little Big Star Cebu, which was reportedly ranked as the fourth top-rating show in Nationwide Charts.

In October 2007, Regis was given her first major dual acting role as a fairy godmother and an evil witch who are twin sisters in Love Spell's Cindyrella, starring Kim Chiu and Gerald Anderson. Sheryn expressed her excitement as she is given the opportunity to dabble into acting and use her past experience in theater. The series ran through early January 2008.

In early 2008, Regis was chosen to be part of the cast of Utoy with Dolphy and Makisig Morales as main stars. However, the teleserye was not aired due to unknown reason.

In June of the same year, she was reported to be part of the final cast of I Love Betty La Fea, ABS-CBN's remake of Betty La Fea, which stars Bea Alonzo on the lead role. She played the role of Kylie in the series.

When she came back in the Philippines in January 2013, she appeared in Bandila under the segment Ikaw Na! of Boy Abunda. Further, she became a consistent guest singer in the TV5 variety show, Wowowillie. It was also in 2013 when Sheryn released a digital single entitled "Sinungaling Mong Puso" which was composed by Mr. Vehnee Saturno.

In January 2014, she again visited the Philippines. Regis was invited as guest to several TV shows like Sunday All Stars, Unang Hirit and Banana Nite and as a guest judge in It's Showtime. In her interview in Umagang Kay Ganda, she mentioned that she will only stay up to May.

== Filmography ==
=== Television ===
Year	Title	Role
2002	Eat Bulaga! "Sing-Eat"	Herself/Contestant
2003–2004	Star in a Million	Herself/Contestant
2004–2010; 2014–present	ASAP	Herself/Host/Performer
2004-2005	Masayang Tanghali Bayan	Herself/Host/Performer
2005	Most Requested Show	Herself/Host/Performer
2005	Search for the Star in a Million	Herself/Host
2005	Boy and Kris	Herself/Guest
2005	Wowowee	Herself/Guest/Performer
2006	Little Big Star Cebu	Herself/Host
2007	Love Spell	Fairy godmother Season 5, Episode "Cindy-rella"
2008	I Love Betty La Fea	Kylie
2010	It's Showtime	Herself/Judge
2013	Bandila	Herself/Guest
2013	Wowowillie	Herself/Guest/Performer
2014	Sunday All Stars	Herself/Guest/Performer
2014	Unang Hirit	Herself/Guest
2014	Banana Nite	Herself/Guest
2014	It's Showtime	Herself/Judge
2014	Umagang Kay Ganda	Herself/Guest
2020	Wowowin	Herself/Guest with Nina and Katrina Velarde (Instajam)
2022	Magandang Buhay	Herself/Guest
2022	Eat Bulaga!	Herself/Guest/Performer
2022	All Out Sunday	Herself/Guest/Performer
2022	ASAP	Herself/Guest/Performer
2023	Magandang Buhay	Herself/Guest
2023	Eat Bulaga!	Herself/Guest/Performer
2023	Family Feud	Herself/Guest Player
2023	ASAP	Herself/Guest/Performer
2023	It's Showtime	Herself/Guest/Performer
2023	Everybody, Sing!	Herself/Guest/Performer
2023	E.A.T.	Herself/Guest/Performer
2024	ASAP	Herself/Guest/Performer
2024	Fast Talk with Boy Abunda	Herself/Guest

=== Film ===
Year	Title	Role
2023	Becky & Badette	Contestant

== Live performances ==
In November 2004, Regis became part of Viva Concerts' Pinoy Idols: Battle of the Popstars which was held at the Araneta Coliseum. Along with her was Raymond Manalo, Christian Bautista, Mark Bautista, Rachelle Ann Go, Frenchie Dy and Sarah Geronimo. In her solo performance, she performed a medley of her hits, Kailan Kaya, Maybe and Come In Out of the Rain. It was said that the concert was sold out.

In May 2008, she was part of Erik Santos' US Tour. John Prats, Liza Manalo, Denise Laurel, and Pooh were also guests in the concert.

Regis, as well as Pinoy Dream Academy Season 2 winner Laarni Lozada became part of Ronnie Liang's concert, My Ballad, My Music where it was reported that Ronnie's talent fee will proceed to the Aeta people in Angeles City. It was held November 2009 the Metro Bar.

Regis was also invited as a guest performer in Rachelle Ann Go's send-off concert in February 2014. Rachelle together with Sheryn and Jimmy Marquez sang Lady Marmalade. Other guests include Mark Bautista, Christian Bautista, Erik Santos and Regine Velasquez.

In celebration of Solaire Resort & Casino's first anniversary, A Celebration with the Champions was held in March 2014. Regis was part of the concert together with Mark Bautista, fellow Star in a Million contestants Erik Santos and Christian Bautista, The Voice of the Philippines finalists Morissette and Klarisse de Guzman, and finally American Idol (season 11) finalists Jessica Sanchez and Hollie Cavanagh. Sheryn sang a medley of her hits during her solo performance. Moreover, she was part of a trio performance along with Klarisse and Morissette.

In April 2014, she had a concert in Al Nasr Leisureland, Dubai with the Star Power grand champion, Angeline Quinto. The concert is named as "A Night with the Ultimate Divas" which was produced by Prolife Events: Concert Producers & Promoters and was presented by Power Horse Energy Drink.

In celebration of Mother's Day, Regis as well as Jon "Prince of Broadway" Joven had a concert entitled "A Mother's Day to Remember: Concert of World Class Performers" at the Pacific Star Resort & Spa, May 9, 2014.

In June 2014, PLDT US Mobility sponsored a concert for Filipinos in California entitled Freedom Concert Tour as part of the 116th Philippine Independence Day. Part of the concert was Sheryn as well as other Filipino artists and celebrities namely Marian Rivera, Ogie Alcasid, Regine Velasquez, Alden Richards, Jonalyn Viray, Sheryn Regis, Allan K., Giselle Sanchez and Jannelle So. Part of the proceeds were donated for the relief and rehabilitation efforts of the Philippine Disaster Recovery Foundation.

== Awards and nominations ==
List of Awards of Sheryn Regis

Year	Award	Category	Result
1999	Cebu Pop Music Festival	Best Interpreter ("Among Gabayan")	Won
1999	Cebu Pop Music Festival	Cebu Pop Music Festival Champion ("Sheryn Regis")	Won
2000	Cebu Normal University	University Songbird of the Year ("Sheryn Regis")	Won
2002	Eat Bulaga! Birit Baby	Eat Bulaga Birit Baby Champion ("Sheryn Regis")	Won
2004	Star in a Million	1st Runner up ("Sheryn Regis")	Won
2004	Star in a Million	Texter's Choice Awardee ("Sheryn Regis")	Won
2004	Voice of Asia	1st Runner up ("Sheryn Regis")	Won
2004	Philippine Association of the Record Industry (2004)	Triple Platinum Awardee ("Star in a Million Album")	Won
2004	Philippine Association of the Record Industry (2004)	Platinum Awardee ("Come in on Out of the Rain")	Won
2004	Provincial Government of Cebu	Garbo sa Sugbo Awardee	Awarded
2005	21st Year-Ender Excellence Awards	Top Entertainer International Achievement Awardee ("Sheryn Regis")	Won
2005	21st Year-Ender Excellence Awards	Best Female Performer in Asia Pacific ("Sheryn Regis")	Won
2005	Yes Magazine	Best Female Performer-People's Choice Awardee ("Sheryn Regis")	Won
2005	Philippine Association of the Record Industry (2005)	Gold Record Awardee ("What I Do Best")	Won
2005	18th Awit Awards	Best International Awardee("Voice of Asia")	Won
2005	18th Awit Awards	Best Inspirational Song ("Follow Your Dream")	Nominated
2005	18th Awit Awards	Best Regional Recording ("Among Gabayan")	Nominated
2005	18th Awit Awards	Best Song Written for Movie/TV/Stage Play ("Kailan Kaya")	Nominated
2005	18th Aliw Awards	Best Concert Performer in an Intimate Venue Female ("Sheryn Regis")	Nominated
2006	iFM Pinoy Music Awards	Best Song by a Female Performer ("What I Do Best")	Won
2006	iFM Pinoy Music Awards	Texter's Choice Awardee ("Sheryn Regis")	Won
2006	S-Magazine's Readers' Choice Awards	Song of the Year ("Hindi Ko Kayang Iwan Ka")	Won
2007	1st OPM Songhits Awards	Best Female Recording Artist ("Sheryn Regis")	Won
2007	1st OPM Songhits Awards	Texter's Choice Awards ("Sheryn Regis")	Won
2007	3rd ASAP Platinum Circle Awards	Compilation Awardee ("Nagmamahal Kapamilya Album")	Won
2007	3rd ASAP Platinum Circle Awards	Compilation Awardee ("Hotsilog")	Won
2007	Philippine Association of the Record Industry (2007)	Sextuple Platinum Awardee ("Nagmamahal Kapamilya Album")	Won
2007	Philippine Association of the Record Industry (2007)	Platinum Awardee ("Hotsilog")	Won
2007	S-Magazine's Peoples' Choice Awards	Brightest Female Popstar ("Sheryn Regis")	Nominated
2007	20th Awit Awards	Best Dance Song ("Bongga Ka Day")	Nominated
2007	20th Awit Awards	Best Song Written for Movie/TV/Stage Play ("Maria Flordeluna")	Nominated
2008	Asian Star Entertainment Awards	Best Female Performing Artist ("Sheryn Regis")	Won
2008	Asian Golden Elephant Awards in Bangkok Thailand	Best Promising Female Entertainer ("Sheryn Regis")	Won
2009	Asia Pacific Excellence Awards	Outstanding Female Recording Artist ("Sheryn Regis")	Won
2009	1st Sharon Videoke	Sharon Videoke Champion ("Sheryn Regis")	Won
2009	Shall We Dance?	Sayawoke Winner ("Sheryn Regis")	Won
2009	22nd Awit Awards	Best Christmas Song Award ("Pasko Na Sinta Ko")	Nominated
2010	22nd Philippine Awit Awards	People's Choice Favorite Female Recording Artist ("Sheryn Regis")	Won
2011	100th Years of Cebu Normal University	Service and honor Award ("Sheryn Regis")	Won
2011	Hawaii State Recognition	Hawaii State Recognition Awardee("Sheryn Regis")	Won
2017	Asia Pacific Awards Council	37th People's Choice Awardee as "Asia's Performing Diva" ("Sheryn Regis")	Won
2022	YouTube	Silver Play Button Award (100,000 subscriber) ("Sheryn Regis")	Won
2022	35th Awit Award	People's Voice Category-Favorite Song(Gusto Ko Nang Bimitaw)	Nominated
2023	6th Philippine Empowered Men and Women 2023	Philippine Empowered Men and Women 2023 Awardees ("Sheryn Regis")	Won
2023	National Customers's Choice Achievement Awards 2023	Asia's Outstanding Phenomenal Diva ("Sheryn Regis")	Won
2023	Brand Asia Awards 2023	Top Performing Singing Artist of the Year ("Sheryn Regis")	Won
2023	7th Outstanding Men & Women of the Philippines 2023	Outstanding LGBTQIA+ ("Sheryn Regis")	Won
2023	36th Aliw Awards	Best Female Performance in Concert	Won
2024	14th Star Awards for Music	Revival Recording of the Year ("Sheryn Regis")	Nominated
2024	14th Star Awards for Music	Concert Performer of the Year ("Love United")	Nominated
2024	14th Star Awards for Music	Female Concert Performer of the Year ("Love United")	Nominated
2024	9th Asia Pacific Luminare Awards	International Vocal Iconic Sensation of the Year	Won
2024	Asia's Golden Icon Awards	Asia's Exceptional Singer for Outstanding Artistry	Won
2024	37th Awit Awards	Best Global Colloaboration Recording	Won
2026	Asia's Golden Icon Awards	Asia’s Icon of Excellence in Music and Entertainment Awardee	Won

== Songwritings ==
Year	Song	Artist
2006	My Heart Beats for You	Herself
2006	Sana'y Ingatan Mo	Herself
2010	Pusong Lito	Her Self
2023	Gusto Ko Nang Bumitaw	Herself

== See also ==
- Anggun ("Voice of Asia")
