= Come In Out of the Rain =

Come in Out of the Rain

Studio album by Sheryn Regis
- Released: May 2004 (Philippines)
- Recorded: 2004
- Genre: P-pop
- Length: 41:13
- Label: Star Records
- Producer: Jonathan Manalo

Sheryn Regis chronology
Come in Out of the Rain (2004)	What I Do Best (2005)

Come In Out of the Rain is the debut studio album by Filipina singer Sheryn Regis, released under Star Records, in May 2004 in the Philippines. It is her best selling album to date, selling over 40,000 copies and certified as platinum by Philippine Association of the Record Industry (PARI).

The album was made available on digital download.

== Album information ==
Right after Regis' 1st runner-up finish in Star in a Million, she recorded the album under Star Records. The carrier single, Come In Out of the Rain, is a revival of a Wendy Moten original in 1992 was a hit where it charted in many station and top the Myx Music Chart at no. 1 for 12 consecutive weeks. The other remakes in the album include a duet between Lea Salonga and Brad Kane entitled We Could Be in Love, and a duet between Peabo Bryson and Roberta Flack entitled Maybe.

Maybe her second single being released chart in the top chart.

Kailan Kaya, composed by Cacai Velasquez and Raul Mitra, is the theme song of the ABS-CBN primetime fantaserye, Marina. The said single also charted in different radio stations. The song was nominated in 18th Awit Award for Best Song Written for Movie/TV/Stage Play.

During Sheryn Regis' stint in the Voice of Asia Song festival held in Kazakhstan, she sang Sana'y Di Pangarap, Now More Than Ever, and Follow Your Dream.

Her song in Voice of Asia (where she placed as 1st runner-up) was nominated in the 18th Awit Award for Best Inspirational Song.

Among Gabayan is the only song in the album written in Sheryn's native Cebuano language dedicated to Santo Niño, the patron saint of her hometown Cebu. The song was nominated in Best Regional Recording category in 18th Awit Award.

== Track listing ==
1. "Come In Out of the Rain" - (04:13)
2. "Sana'y Ingatan Mo" - (03:53)
3. "We Could Be in Love" - (04:30)
4. "Kailan Kaya" - (04:24)
5. "Sana'y Di Pangarap" - (04:02)
6. "Maybe" - (03:36)
7. "Now More Than Ever" - (04:01)
8. "Shoobee Doo Wop" - (04:03)
9. "Follow Your Dream" - (04:24)
10. "Among Gabayan" - (04:07)

== Certifications ==
Country	Provider	Certification	Sales
Philippines	PARI	Platinum	40,000

== Awards and nominations ==
Year	Award giving body	Category	Result
2005	18th Awit Awards	Best International Awardee("Voice of Asia")	Won
2005	18th Awit Awards	Best Inspirational Song ("Follow Your Dream")	Nominated
2005	18th Awit Awards	Best Regional Recording ("Among Gabayan")	Nominated
2005	18th Awit Awards	Best Song Written for Movie/TV/Stage Play ("Kailan Kaya")	Nominated
