= Life's What You Make It (album) =

Studio album by Wendy Moten
- Released: July 1996
- Studios: Pearl Sound Studios (Canton, Michigan); Studio A (Dearborn Heights, Michigan); House of Blues (Memphis, Tennessee); The Loft (Nashville, Tennessee); Chung King Studios and Pilot Recording Studios (New York City, New York)
- Genre: R&B/Soul
- Length: 43:17
- Label: I.R.S.
- Producers: Curtis Mathewson; Wendy Moten; Dick Williams

Wendy Moten chronology
Christmas Time (1995)	Life's What You Make It (1996)	Tis the Season (2009)

Professional ratings
Review scores
Source	Rating
AllMusic	2.5/5 stars

Life's What You Make It is the third album by American R&B singer Wendy Moten.

== Overview ==
Following her success with the album Time for Change, released the previous year, Moten returned to the studio to record her third album. She co-wrote two of the tracks as well as featuring on the production, in addition to her usual vocal duties. The album failed to have any success in her native US but its title track was another smash hit when released as a single in Japan, reaching number 1.

== Reception ==
AllMusic's Alex Henderson gave the album 2 stars out of 5, and called the album "a generally respectable, if slightly uneven, sophomore outing for the Memphis singer".

== Track listing ==
Standard edition
No.	Title	Writer(s)	Length
1.	"Life's What You Make It"	Tim Friese-Greene, Mark Hollis	4:37
2.	"Subways Are for Sleeping"	Anders Bagge, Lou Christie, Pat MacDonald	4:16
3.	"If You Don't Love Me"	Michael Garvin, Randy Jacobs, Winston Sela, Dick Williams	3:55
4.	"People Got to Be Free"	Felix Cavaliere, Eddie Brigati	3:54
5.	"Stone Jumping"	Anabella Levin, Stephen Lironi	4:38
6.	"When the World Is Running Down"	Sting	4:33
7.	"Don't Turn Away"	Jostyn	4:36
8.	"Another Nothing Song"	MacDonald, Moten	4:06
9.	"Believe in Love"	Curtis Mathewson, Moten	3:31
10.	"It's Over Now"	Imogen Heap	5:11
Total length:			43:17

Japanese edition
No.	Title	Writer(s)	Length
1.	"Life's What You Make It"	Friese-Greene, Hollis	4:37
2.	"When the World Is Running Down"	Sting	4:33
3.	"Subways Are for Sleeping"	Bagge, Christie, MacDonald	4:16
4.	"If You Don't Love Me"	Garvin, Jacobs, Sela, Williams	3:55
5.	"People Got to Be Free"	Cavaliere, Brigati	3:54
6.	"Stone Jumping"	Levin, Lironi	4:38
7.	"Don't Turn Away"	Jostyn	4:36
8.	"Another Nothing Song"	MacDonald, Moten	4:06
9.	"Believe in Love"	Curtis Mathewson, Moten	3:31
10.	"It's Over Now"	Heap	5:11
Total length:			43:17

== Production ==
- Wendy Moten – producer (1, 4, 8)
- Dick Williams – producer (1–3, 5–7, 10), management
- Mindy Jostyn – additional vocal production (7)
- Alfredo Scotti – additional vocal production (7)
- Curtis Mathewson – producer (9)
- Emilie Burnham – art direction
- John Eder – photography
- Steve Moir – management

Technical credits

- Bob Ludwig – mastering at Gateway Mastering (Portland, Maine)
- Grant Mohrman – recording, mixing
- Dick Williams – mixing (1–7, 10)
- Malcolm Springer – recording (2)
- Curtis Mathewson – recording (9), mixing (9)
- Steve Capp – recording (10)
- Gary Harwood – additional recording (7), assistant engineer (10)
- Will Schillinger – additional recording (7)
- Robert Tassi – additional recording (8)
- Anthony Gallagher – assistant engineer (1)
- Michael Tuller – assistant engineer (3–6, 8, 10)
- Brian Miller – assistant engineer (4, 10)
- David Sealy – assistant engineer (5, 6)
- Tim Roberts – assistant engineer (8)
- Todd Fairall – assistant engineer (10)

== Personnel ==
- Wendy Moten – lead vocals, backing vocals
- Luis Resto – keyboards (1, 2, 6–8), programming (1, 2, 7, 8), acoustic piano (3), keyboard programming (10)
- Dick Williams – grand piano (10), keyboard programming (10)
- Randy Jacobs – guitars (1, 2, 5, 6, 8), electric guitar (3)
- Mitch Stokes – guitars (2)
- Donnie Lyle – acoustic guitar (3)
- Dominic Miller – acoustic guitar (4)
- Grant Mohrman – sitar (5)
- Anita Cochran – guitars (7)
- Curtis Mathewson – guitars (8, 9), programming (9)
- Al Turner – bass (2)
- Ray Burton – bass (3–6, 10)
- David Santos – bass (8)
- Ron Otis – drums (2)
- Arthur "Buster" Marbury – drums (4–6), percussion (10)
- Steve Potts – drums (7)
- Bobby Myers – drums (8)
- Chip Moreland – drums (9)
- Mario Resto – drums (10)
- Larry Fratangelo – percussion (4–6)
- Mark Kieme – saxophones (6)
- Edward Gooch – trombone (6)
- Mike Pashenee – trombone (6)
- Walter White – trumpet (2, 6), horn arrangements (6)
- Marcy Chanteaux – cello (4)
- The Ridgeway Sisters – backing vocals (4)

The Memphis Symphony Orchestra on "Don't Turn Away"

- Luis Resto – string arrangements
- Peter Spurbeck – cello
- Gaylon Patterson – violin
- Kathleen Powell – violin
- Laurie Pyatt – violin

Detroit Symphony Orchestra on "It's Over Now"

- Paul Riser – string arrangements
- Marcy Chanteaux – cello
- Hart Hollman – viola
- Linda Snedden Smith – violin
- Adam Stepniewski – violin
