= Otakar Hromádko =

Czechoslovak journalist and army officer

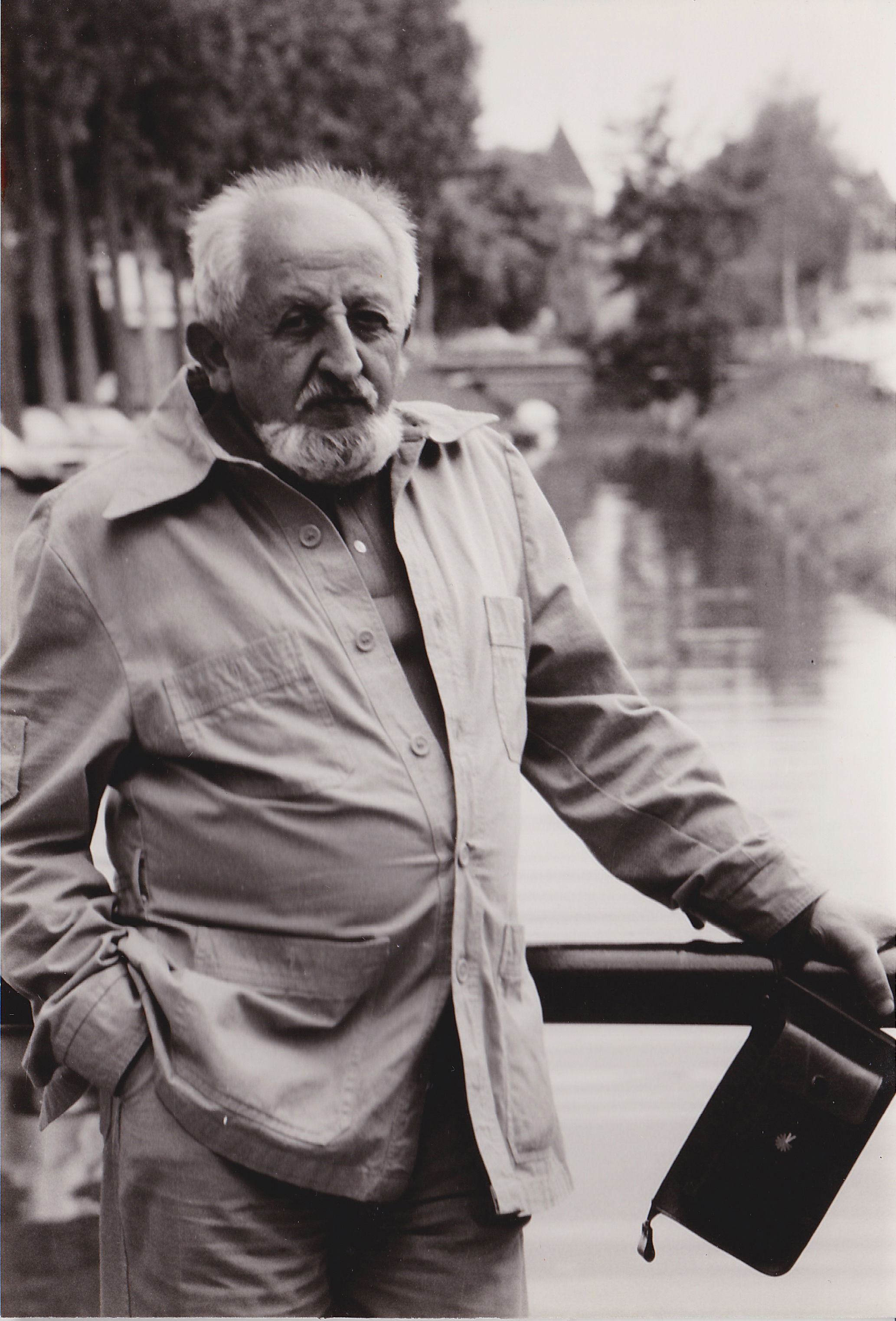
- Otakar Hromádko in Yverdon in 1982
- Born: August 30, 1909; Kněž, Bohemia, Austria-Hungary
- Died: April 14, 1983 (aged 73); Yverdon, Switzerland
- Occupations: Journalist, army officer
- Spouse: Věra Waldes

Otakar Hromádko (30 August 1909 – 14 April 1983) was a Czechoslovak journalist and army officer. Although he spent first half of his life fighting for communist ideals later became a victim of communist purges and a political émigré.

Although he grew up a strong anti-militarist, he ended up having a significant military career and was awarded military decorations by four countries: France (Croix de Guerre), Poland (War Order of Virtuti Militari), Yugoslavia (Order of National Merit) and Czechoslovakia (several decorations including the Czechoslovak War Cross and highest order of Czechoslovakia, Order of the White Lion). He fought as a volunteer in International Brigades in Spanish Civil War and French anti-Nazi resistance during World War II. After World War II he returned to Czechoslovakia and took part in strengthening the dominance of the Communist Party of Czechoslovakia in the years leading to, and immediately following, the 1948 Czechoslovak coup d'état. His military career culminated in the late 1940s when he became the general secretary of all communist organizations in the Czechoslovak Army. In the early 1950s he fell victim to communist purges and was sentenced to 12 years of prison. Served over five years in prisons and labor camps in uranium mines. In 1956, he was released and later fully rehabilitated. After the Warsaw Pact invasion of Czechoslovakia in 1968 he emigrated to Switzerland. He died in Yverdon-les-Bains in 1983.

Hromádko spent almost 10 years of his life in prisons, labour camps and detention camps under different regimes and in different countries. Later, in 1982, he published a book of memoirs focused mostly on his prison experience and disillusionment from revolutions.

== Early life ==
Hromádko was born 30 August 1909 in Kněž, Bohemia, to forester Otto Hromádko and his wife Marie Hromádková. When his father died in 1914 in World War I, the family (mother, grandparents and Otakar with 3 siblings) moved to town Německý Brod. In 1928 he started studying law in Brno and entered Young Communist League of Czechoslovakia (Komsomol). In 1930 he was arrested and imprisoned as a leader of a group of students that painted anti-war slogans (his anti-militarism can be traced back to loss of his father and to the influence of his mother and grandfather Kadleček) on a church in Německý Brod. He was subsequently excluded from the university in Brno. In the following years, he focused fully on communist activity. He was the Regional Secretary of Komsomol and Regional Secretary of the Communist Party of Czechoslovakia in electoral regions Pardubice, Prague-venkov and České Budějovice. He was also the editor of Rudé právo, the official newspaper of the Communist Party of Czechoslovakia, and of journal Jednota.

He spent long periods of the 1930s in hiding, as he was wanted by Czechoslovak police and courts for numerous crimes, mostly involving illegal distribution of communist press. Between 1930 and 1936, he was imprisoned or detained ten times in eight different prisons in Czechoslovakia and once in Dresden, Germany.

== Spanish Civil War and World War II ==
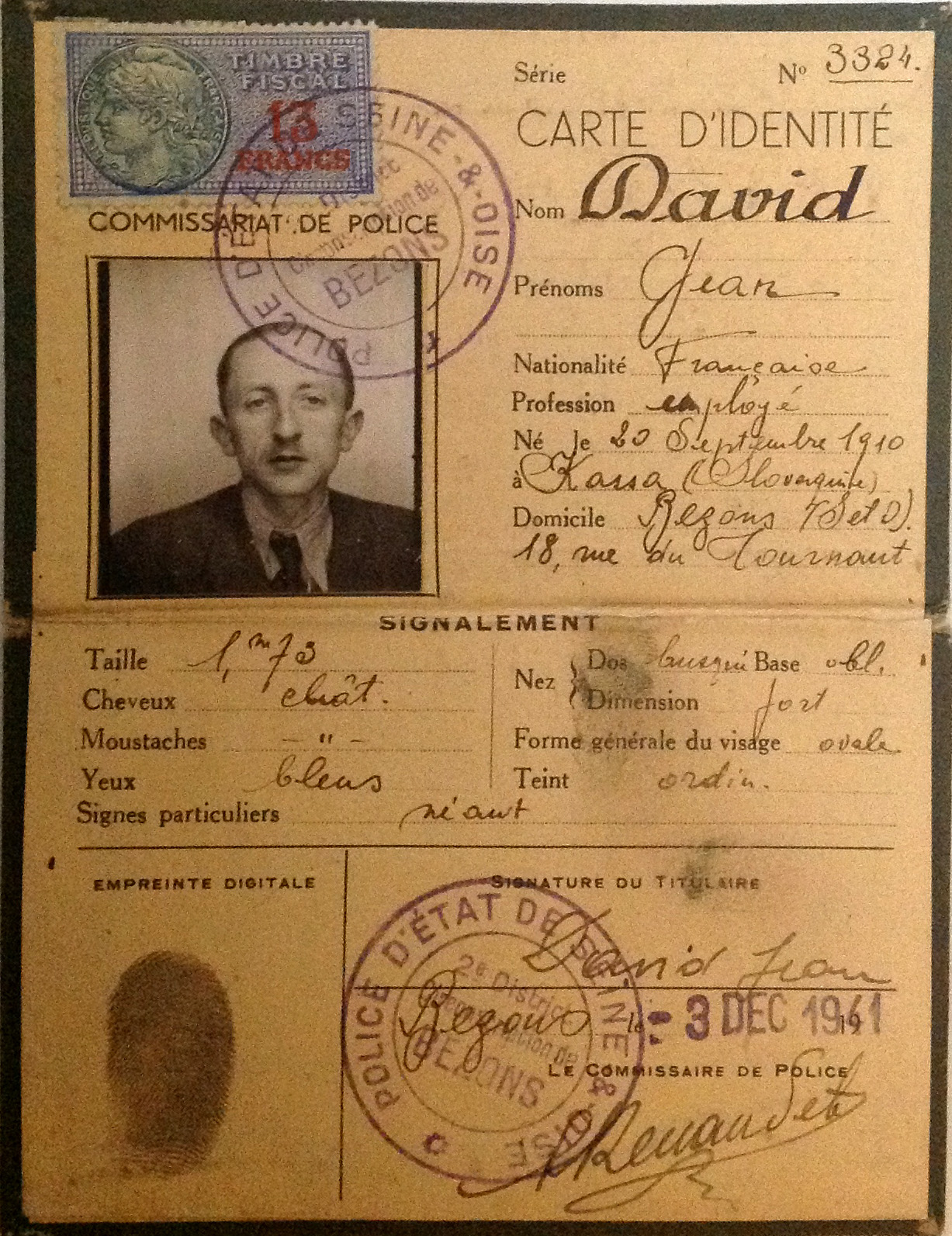
Hromadko's false ID during World War II in France

After the outbreak of the Spanish Civil War, he volunteered to fight in the International Brigades. He served as a political commisaire in the 129th International Brigade, battalion Masaryk, between 1937 and 1939. He fought at the fronts in Extramadura, Aragon, Levante and as the rear-guard during the retreat from Catalonia to France. After crossing the Pyrénées, he was interned in French internment camps in St. Cyprien and Gurs. In both camps he was the head of illegal organization of Czechoslovak communists. In October 1939 he was transported together with other „Komintern agents“ to the concentration camp Vernet.

On June 2, 1941, he managed to escape from Nazi transport to Germany. He immediately joined the French resistance in Paris. Since 1941 was a member of Czechoslovak Central National Committee in France (Československý ústřední národní výbor pro Francii), from 1943 military officer in the same organization. Since 1943 he was one of four staff officers who coordinated military activities of international groups in non-occupied France that were incorporated into the French Forces of the Interior (FFI). Gaining a rank of Captain of FFI, he was in command of 1,200-strong group of non-French militias in Paris region. During his stay in Paris, Hromádko fell in love with Věra Waldes, a daughter of wealthy Czech industrial family. They narrowly escaped detention multiple times. In 1945 Hromádko worked for Czech broadcasting of French national radio in Paris. At the end of the war, Ota and Věra married in Paris under fake documents – even their witnesses‘ documents were fake. In summer 1945, the husbands were awarded military awards for their role in the resistance.

== Return to Czechoslovakia ==
In July 1945, Otakar and Věra moved to Czechoslovakia. They had two children, both born in Prague: Jiřina (born 31 December 1945) and Hana (21 February 1947 – 7 March 2007).

After the return, Hromádko joined the International and Organizational Departments of the Secretariat of the Central Committee of the Communist Party of Czechoslovakia (ÚV KSČ), where he utilized his management skills and experience in building conspiracy networks. Since October 1947, he was responsible for maintaining cooperation with communist infiltrators to the National Socialist party. In December 1947, Hromádko became the head of a newly created secret department, officially called Department of National Front (Odbor Národní fronty). This department was responsible for gathering intelligence about non-communist parties (especially the National Socialist party and Social Democratic party) and creating "left" fractions within them that would weaken them or break them apart. Department of National Front was officially part of Information bureau (Informační oddělení – headed by Bedřich Geminder, with Hromádko as his deputy), but in reality it was managed directly by the General Secretary Rudolf Slánský.

Hromádko was also an editor, and briefly editor-in-chief of Funkcionář, a journal for Communist party members dedicated to strengthening organizational and ideological capacity of communist cadres. Between October 1945 and the 1948 Czechoslovak coup d'état, he has written instructional articles on topics such as: how to build and manage local party organizations; how to gain support on the countryside and among youth; how to lead pre-election campaign and how to understand planned agricultural reform. After February 1948 he advised on screening party members and "cleaning" the party from reactionary elements and warned against radical "bolshevization" of the party.

In 1949 he was mobilized into Czechoslovak army and became the general secretary of all communist organizations in the army.

== The trial with "group of army generals" and jail ==
In February 1951, Hromádko was arrested and tried in a secret constructed trial of army officers together with Antonín Svoboda and Bedřich Kopold. He was accused of treason, espionage and sabotage. For three years between arrest and trial, he was held in Koloděje and Ruzyně prisons. In April 1954 he was convicted to 12 years of prison. He spent the term in the Pankrác Prison, Leopoldov Prison and labour camp "Rovnost" by Jáchymov uranium mines.

Despite three years of harsh interrogations, Hromádko never admitted his guilt over the crimes that he has been accused of. This has brought him complications form the interrogation teams and prison supervisors who interpreted it as “bad behavior.“ As a result of destalinization in Czechoslovakia, Hromádko was released 30 April 1956 and later fully rehabilitated.

== Works ==
- Hromádko, Ota. "La révolution mange ses enfants. Soit! Mais common et pourquoi? (Manuscript, 1972)". Zurich, Schweizerisches Sozialarchiv, 335/350a-2.
- Hromádko, Ota (1982). Jak se kalila voda: výbor z kriminálních příběhů a úvah. Koln: Index.
- Hromádko, Ota. "K historii československých dobrovolníků ve Španělsku" Příspěvky k dějinám KSČ, 3/1966, pp. 376–389.
- Hromádko, Ota. "Ještě poznámky k historii čs. dobrovolníků ve Španělsku" Příspěvky k dějinám KSČ, 6/1967, pp. 917–921.
- Hromádko, Ota. "Čechoslováci v bojích o Španělsko" Tvorba, 10 April 1946, p. 231.
