= Nagmamahal, Kapamilya =

- Genre: Drama; Public Broadcasting
- Created by: ABS-CBN News and Current Affairs
- Presented by: Bernadette Sembrano
- Opening theme: "Dahil Nagmamahal" by Sheryn Regis
- Country of origin: Philippines
- Original language: Filipino
- No. of episodes: 66

Production
- Running time: 30-60 minutes

Original release
- Network: ABS-CBN
- Release: April 18, 2006 – October 13, 2007

Nagmamahal, Kapamilya was a Philippine television public service drama anthology series broadcast by ABS-CBN. Hosted by Bernadette Sembrano, it premiered on April 18, 2006, and was originally aired on Tuesday nights before being moved to the network's Saturday afternoon lineup from July 8, 2006 to October 13, 2007. The theme song, "Dahil Nagmamahal", was performed by Sheryn Regis from her second album, What I Do Best.

During its initial five months, Nagmamahal, Kapamilya showcased the lives of overseas Filipinos through dramatized storytelling. In November 2006, approximately four months after transitioning to a Saturday timeslot, the program underwent a format change. It shifted to a documentary style, incorporating real footage to depict the emotional reunions of Filipino families and featuring interviews with notable Filipino personalities who had gained recognition abroad.

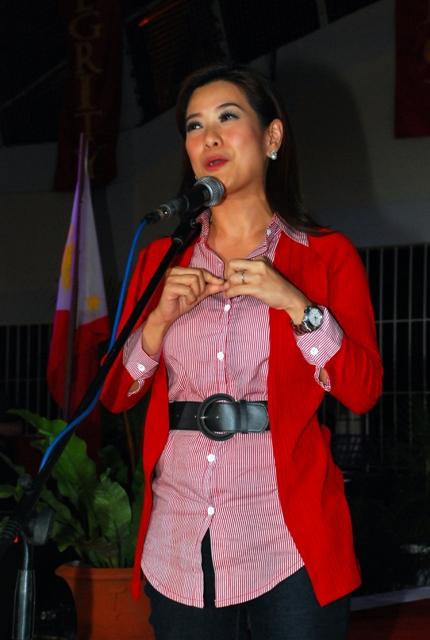
Bernadette Sembrano serves as a host.

== Notable episodes ==
=== Paz Pejoro Story (July 8, 2006) ===
Paz Pejoro's has raised 14 children, half her life on her own after her husband Gorio died. The children are now successful in their own way, most of them living in America. In 1997, Malacañang awarded Paz Pejoro as an Ulirang Ina in recognition of her accomplishment. Now she is alone, languishing in a convalescent home in San Francisco, longing for the company of her children. Nagmamahal, Kapamilya mounts a family reunion for Paz, even for just a brief moment, to be in the company of her children.

- Writer: Genesis Rodriguez
- Director: Rechie A. del Carmen
- Cast: Coney Reyes, Dimples Romana, Kristopher Peralta and Kathryn Luna

=== Monica Bauer and Yolly Montoya Story (July 29, 2006) ===
Monica and Yolly have been friends for more than a decade. A friendship that goes beyond the color of skin, culture, language and location. Monica is a big, blond, transsexual nurse who works at Mt Sinai Hospital in New York and Yolly is a typical promdi from Calasiao, Pangasinan.

Monica visited the Philippines years ago and met Yolly who was then pregnant. Yolly named the baby after Monica and made her the Ninang. This integrated Monica to Yolly's family in Calasiao and, save for documents and legalities, the baby became Monica's adopted daughter. Shuttling back and forth from New York to Calasiao, Monica has visited baby Nikka every six months for the last ten years, sent her money for schooling, and thereby became a part of Yolly's big family. Monica, who was adopted as a child and lived with several foster families, has found herself a family to love, to care and to share her dreams with, halfway across the globe. "It is a family built not by blood, but by relationships," she said.

- Writer: Dindo Perez
- Director: Don M. Cuaresma
- Cast: Candy Pangilinan as Yolly and Marco Alcaraz as Monica

=== Rene and Luisa (August 5, 2006) ===
Rene and Luisa are childhood sweethearts. Luisa is an ambitious girl who chose to leave her family in the Philippines and her boyfriend, Rene, to be an entertainer in Japan and eventually in Turkey. Luisa is forced to marry, Osman, a Turkish national to avoid being sent to Iraq. Luisa and Rene part ways. Luisa stopped writing letters to Rene, who, devastated by the news of Luisa's marriage and to get back at Luisa, marries a woman 14 years older. Luisa separates from her husband and goes home with her child. She decides to contact Rene after more than 20 years. First love is rekindled and Rene tells Luisa that he is separated. They decide to spend the rest of their lives together.

- Writer: Francis Xavier E. Pasion
- Director: Jerome C. Pobocan
- Cast: Eula Valdez as Luisa and Tonton Gutierrez as Rene

=== Edna Sakine (replay with update) (September 30, 2006) ===
The story of a mother's web of lies and broken promises to her children so she could go to Japan and give them better lives. While she thought what she was doing for the best, her children feel a growing resentment and hatred for her. After two failed relationships and three children from different fathers, how can she make them accept and understand? And how can she give them now a better life with pending deportation? Nagmamahal set up a reunion for Edna and her three children in Japan.

- Writer: Obet Villela
- Director: Rosanna Roces, Marla Boyd, Dexter Doria, Kathryn Bernardo, KC Hollmann, Marvin Uchida (Japanese)

=== Ellen of Oh Tokyo! (October 7, 2006) ===
This is a success story of Ellen, who from birth often made mistakes in life but eventually became victorious because of her pure heart and her clumsiness. Showcasing the inspiring events that led to her becoming an international reporter and having the most unexpected success of all, the love of her life, this story says that character cannot be developed in ease and quiet and that only through experience of trial and suffering can the soul be strengthened, vision cleared, ambition inspired and success achieved.

- Writer: John Roque
- Director: Aloy Adlawan
- Cast: Toni Gonzaga (as Ellen), Zanjoe Marudo (as Ellen's husband), Susan Africa (Ellen's mother), Nonie Buencamino (Ellen's father)

=== Hong Kong Village (October 14, 2006) ===
A tale of three sisters and how they struggled and eventually triumphed in Hong Kong. Marife is the eldest of the Luzon family and she was the first Filipina in her village in Calapan to go abroad. She has inspired the other Pinays in the neighborhood to go to Hong Kong. Thus, her village became known as the Hong Kong Village. Her two younger sisters followed suit, Olympia and Mylene. Tragedy struck Mylene as she was diagnosed to have SARS. She is the first Filipina to be afflicted with it. Marife and Olympia remained strong for Mylene. When Mylene came back to their Hong Kong Village, the village that once expressed gratitude to their family, now condemns and outcasts them.

- Writer: Arah Badaios
- Director: Gilbert G. Perez
- Cast: Aiza Marquez, Jodi Sta. Maria, Desiree del Valle

=== Sikat Pinoy Part 3 (October 21, 2006) ===
A documentary magazine special on popular and intriguing Pinoys:

- American half-Pinoy, half-Greek wrestling superstar Dave Bautista is coming back this October but instead of what has been featured about him before, this time, we find out about his relatives and his Filipina wife.
- Experiential journey with good looking Fil-Am, David Poarch who chose to leave his luxurious life in the U.S. to experience being Filipino in Subic.
- Kathleen de Leon, the Filipino member of Hi-5 in Nickelodeon
- Melchirsel Bakery, a Filipino family who introduced pandesal and pan de coco to Australia.
