= 'Tis the Season =

'Tis the Season may refer to:

== Music ==
- "'Tis the season", lyrics from the 1862 Christmas carol "Deck the Halls"
- 'Tis the SeaSon, a 2016 album by Jimmy Buffett
- 'Tis the Season (Vince Gill and Olivia Newton-John album) (2000)
- Tis the Season (Wendy Moten album) (2009)
- 'Tis the Season (Jordan Smith album) (2016)

== Other uses ==
- 'Tis the Season (novel), a 2007 children's novel from the Main Street series by Ann M. Martin

== See also ==
- Christmas and holiday season
- "'Tis the Damn Season", a 2020 song by Taylor Swift from Evermore
- 'Tis the Season for Los Straitjackets!, a 2002 album by Los Straitjackets
- 'Tis the Season to Be Fearless, a 2010 compilation album by Fearless Records
- "'Tis the Season to Be Smurfy", a 1987 episode of The Smurfs
