= Marina (2004 TV series) =

- Title card
- Genre: Fantasy; Drama; Romance
- Created by: ABS-CBN Studios
- Written by: Keiko Aquino; Agnes Gagilonia-Uligan
- Directed by: Wenn V. Deramas; Andoy Ranay; Erick C. Salud
- Starring: Claudine Barretto
- Theme music composer: Raul Mitra; Cacai Velasquez-Mitra
- Ending theme: "Kailan Kaya" by Sheryn Regis
- Country of origin: Philippines
- Original language: Filipino
- No. of seasons: 2
- No. of episodes: 188

Production
- Executive producers: Carlo Katigbak; Cory Vidanes; Laurenti Dyogi; Cathy Ochoa-Perez; Malou Santos
- Producers: Desirey Fernandez; Nini S. Matilac
- Running time: 16-37 minutes
- Production company: Star Creatives

Original release
- Network: ABS-CBN
- Release: February 23 – November 12, 2004

Related
- Dyosa (2008); Mutya (2011); Aryana (2012); Dyesebel (2014)

Marina is a Philippine television drama fantasy series broadcast by ABS-CBN. Starring Claudine Barretto in the title role. It aired on the network's Primetime Bida line up from February 23 to November 12, 2004.

== Premise ==
Elias, a fisherman, falls in love with and marries Esther; spurning the love of Victoria, a witch. Heartbroken, the vengeful Victoria places a curse on Esther and Elias's unborn child. In the hopes that Victoria will lift the curse on his child, Elias abandons Esther for Victoria and they have a child of their own, Luna. Meanwhile, Esther raises her and Elias's daughter, Cristina, on her own. On Cristina's seventh birthday, Victoria's curse comes to fruition and Cristina is transformed into a mermaid. Elias assaults Victoria in retaliation and cripples her. He is then attacked by Dugong, a sea-witch and Victoria's cousin, and loses his sanity. To save Cristina from the superstitious fishermen, who believe mermaids to be unlucky, Esther is forced to release her daughter into the sea. There, she is taken in by the other mermaids and adopted by their queen Istah, and renamed "Marina."

Though happy among the mermaids, Marina dreams of being able to walk again and reclaiming her human life. Istah gives Marina her precious necklace as payment for Dugong, who is able to restore Marina's legs.

Marina becomes human again and returns to the land to reclaim everything. However, she soon discovers that she becomes a mermaid again during the full moon, only true love's first kiss can break the curse. Dugong, on the other hand, learned that the powerful necklace of Istah was a trap. Donning the necklace, she discovered that she cannot remove it, and worse, suffers the same injuries Marina does.

Meanwhile, Dugong's mother and Victoria's aunt, Tandang Ella, pays a visit to Victoria. She trades the power of the Aram for a chance to see her daughter again. Dugong, having been separated from her mother since she was an egg, harbored ill feelings but, upon learning that her mother is alive and is looking for her, could not help looking forward to meeting her mother. Victoria, however, tricks the old woman and kills her the moment she met her daughter, believing Dugong hated her mother anyway. She kept the power of the Aram for herself.

On the eve of Marina's 21st birthday, Victoria and her daughter Luna pay a surprise visit to give her stepdaughter her "gift". Using the powers of the Aram, she turns Marina back into a mermaid. Victoria then went to a circus where she made the poor mermaid the star attraction. When the circus master wanted more oddities to star in the circus, Victoria also used the powers of the Aram to capture Dugong and her slave, Pearly.

Rodge attempted to rescue her love but Luna had placed him under a curse, turning him into a cat, while Victoria used the powers of the aram to turn Marina into a fish. Eventually, with the help of her newfound friends, Marina was able to get away from Victoria's clutches and eventually found her way into another fishing town, to a family of fairies.

The King of the Seas ordered to have Victoria and Luna arrested and placed inside a force field prison to prevent them from escaping. Marina, on the other hand was now able to live her life as a human when she married Rodge and was now pregnant.

All things seem well except for Victoria. She wants to get revenge on the people who foiled her evil plans. She had heard of a meteorite stone that, once in the hands of its owner, can give out an enormous power. She escaped from her prison and got her hands on one of the stones that fell that night. By using its power, the evil witch had Luna and Marina switch places, with the latter's unborn child now in Luna's womb.

One day, Marina woke up, found herself inside a prison and the shokoy guards calling her "Luna". She eventually came to the conclusion that Victoria will not rest unless she gets her way. Asking help from Dugong's sister, Ignarva. Marina turned into a mermaid again as an exchange of Ignarva's assistance, hoping to claim everything Luna took away from her. With the help of many of her friends who see her as Marina beyond what they physically see, they were able to break Victoria's spell, although Marina's child was still inside Luna's womb (in a later episode, Luna gave birth to Marina and Rodge's baby girl who was later named Mariluna and seems to be inheriting Marina's curse).

Victoria still won't give up, that's why she had Marina killed but at the cost of her life. Marina's mother Esther began having dreams in which Marina is talking to her to get the Leafar, a magical liquid that can resurrect the dead. But Victoria was able to get into the gate connecting the world of the afterlife and the world of the living, with Marina standing in-between. Esther was surprised to see that whom she had resurrected was not her daughter but the ever-evil witch.

Marina, lost in-between the two worlds, gets help from her father, who is now a spirit. The only way to revive herself again to finally defeat Victoria is to return herself into a mermaid once more.

Eventually, she is able to defeat Victoria but at the cost of it, her last chance of being human forever. She gave her child under the care of Luna and told her to take care of her child as well as her husband, Rodge. Marina, now a mermaid for eternity, bid goodbye to Rodge and their child and returned once more into the ocean.

== Character and cast guides ==
=== Human characters ===
- Esther Sto. Domingo is the loving mother of Marina and dedicated wife of Elias. She is Victoria's ultimate rival in her quest to win Elias' heart. Though she finds it very painful, she opted to send her mermaid daughter to the sea to protect her from the townspeople. Played by Snooky Serna
- Elias Sto. Domingo is a kind-hearted fisherman who commits love to Victoria until he meets the woman of his dreams in the person of Esther. Victoria made him regret marrying Esther for the rest of his life. And to save his daughter Marina from the evil powers of her ex-love, Elias chose to live in the arms of the cruel sea deity. Played by Joel Torre
- Pilar is Esther's loyal assistant who would really give up her life for her employer. A caring mother to Isabel and Mario, Pilar single-handedly raises her two children through Esther's support. Played by Debraliz Valasote
- Raphael Sandico - Esther's psychiatrist who fell in love with Shiela. Raphael is Quintin's older brother. Played by Bobby Andrews
- Isabel - Daughter of Pilar who idolizes Marina. Her father was taken by a mermaid and because of that, Isabel learns to despise all of them. Her fondness for Marina turns into hatred when she discovers that the young, successful woman is no human. Played by Pauleen Luna.
- Carlitos - He is Isabel's best friend who is secretly in love with the pretty, young lady. Knowing that he can't compete with Leon, he chose to be Isabel's shoulder to cry on. Played by Gabb Drilon.
- Rodge - He first saw Marina as a young mermaid when he was a little boy. This fateful encounter leaves him with a fixation on mermaids until he grows up to be a man. In his quest to find his precious mermaid once again, he was deemed by Victoria to be Marina's true love and therefore must be stopped from breaking the curse. Amidst all of Rodge's good qualities lie a tragic flaw—he is also the man in Luna's heart. Played by Rafael Rosell
- Randolph Rivera - A good-looking scuba diver who goes to the fishing village and meets Luna. They got along well but the young lady misconstrues their rapport as something more than friendship. He is mesmerized by Marina's beauty and decides to court her. But the moment Luna finds out about this, she starts to seek her mother's powers to win back her loved man. Played by Alvin Fortuna.
- Quintin Sandico - a happy-go-lucky marine biologist who is commitment-phobic. Quintin is Raphael's younger brother who also develops a special feeling for Marina. He finds the young resort executive so appealing that he pursues her even if it leads to a conflict between him and his older brother. Played by Luke Jickain.
- Leon del Rosario - Nephew of Esther who comes from Manila. Trendy and down-to-earth, he becomes Isabel's highest crush. Although he likes her very much, he tries to hide his affection due to the sad truth that he shall die soon. Played by John Barretto.
- Ronald Martinez - A scuba diver who devotes much of his time with his best friend Randolph. Their strong friendship belies the fact but Ronald begins to see Randolph as more than just a friend. Played by Robin Tolentino.
- Mario Ballestros - Yaya Pilar's responsible son and Isable's protective brother acted as the father figure in their family since the day his father was taken by a mermaid. Played by Dustin Reyes.

=== Mermaids ===
- Marina Aguas/Kristina Sto. Domingo - The main protagonist of the story. A kind hearted, beautiful daughter to Esther and Elias. She was cursed to become a mermaid by Victoria. Out of love and protection, Esther sends her to the sea where she lives a different life under the loving care of Istah and the mermaids. Played by Claudine Barretto. Also Jane Oineza plays the young Kristina/Marina.
- Nanay Istah - The Queen of the mermaids who took good care of Marina when she turned into a mermaid and was sent to Dagat Landia. Istah regards Marina as her own daughter and vows to do everything to make her adoptive child happy... even if it means sacrificing her own life. Played by Sunshine Cruz. Lilia Cuntapay plays the old Istah, while Jane Oineza plays young Istah.
- Quiana - One of the mermaids Marina meets and befriends. Quiana has experienced living a normal life but opts to go back to the sea to become a mermaid again. She also killed Isabel's father because of her deal with Dugong. Played by Maoui David.
- Vexia - Is one of Marina's loyal mermaid friends who would stop at nothing just to protect her. Reliable and supportive, she is Marina's constant companion in her new world under the sea. Played by Jenny Miller.
- Miria - This one is a new mermaid, also the friend of Marina. But she had only a short part in all episodes. Played by Its Saludo.
- Isabel - She was a mermaid at Season 1. Played by Pauleen Luna.
- Sheila - Dugong's daughter, best friend of Marina. She's extremely protective of Marina. Her witch ancestry gives her the power to have supernatural abilities like laser from her eyes, host a spirit to possess her body. Played by Agot Isidro.
- Lorelei - Once a beautiful and intelligent mermaid who wished from Dugong to exchange her beauty and wisdom for human legs to be with the man she loves. Not being able to recognize her, the man rejected her. Played by Eugene Domingo.
- Lirio - The prince of the Sea, Lirio has the power to transform from a merman to a real human... but he has no power to change Marina's heart. In spite of their brief acquaintance, Lirio falls in love with Marina and proves himself integral in her mission to defeat Victoria. Played by Diether Ocampo.

=== Other creatures ===
- Ignarva - A crab-like sea witch and Dugong's half sister who obtained the other half of "bituing kasan-alam". Played by Frances Makil-Ignacio
- Neptuna - Queen of the sea. Played by Patricia Lopez.
- Ninja - A turtle-like creature and a friend of Marina and Dugong. Marina and him became friends when they've met in the circus. Played by Mura.
- Pearly - A gay shokoy and a loyal servant to Dugong as well as her best friend. He was captured by Dugong when she was looking for a man to victimize. Played by Chokoleit.
- Utoy - A fisherman kidnapped by Dugong and enslaved by her. He was tasked by Dugong to catch mermaids, and when he failed, he was transformed into a mermaid and was presented to Victoria as Marina. Played by Ariel Lacson.
- Tandang Ella - A powerful witch and the mother of Dugong. She hates her sister Juliana (the mother of Victoria). She has extensive knowledge in the use of magic, witchcraft and sorcery. She also knows about numerous sea creatures and how to defeat them. Played by Luz Fernandez.
- Pinggoy - The son of the kind couple that adopted Marina. They are actually a family of fairies forced to disguise themselves as humans to evade an evil fairy, Tutubina, and her accomplices. Pinggoy fell for the charms of Marina and this posed an added threat to his and his family's safety because Tutubina is in love with Pinggoy. Played by Onemig Bondoc.

=== Villains ===
- Victoria Raymundo - A vindictive witch whose sole purpose is to make Marina's life miserable. She was heartbroken when she finds out that her great love Elias marries Esther. Played by Cherie Gil.
- Luna - The love child of Elias and Victoria is a reluctant heiress to her mother's evil powers. Simple and good-natured, she falls in love with Rodge. Upon knowing that Rodge's heart belonged to Marina, she willingly accepted her mother's powers. Played by Meryll Soriano. Also Kristel Fulgar plays the young Luna.
- Dugong - A fearsome sea witch who gave Victoria the powers she needed to curse Marina. Jealous of Marina and the mermaids for their beauty but eventually becomes good friends with them and often comes to their aid. Played by Malou de Guzman.
- Gurruto - The king of the underworld who falls in love with Esther and offers to marry her. Played by Cholo Escano.
- Tutubina - A fairy who's jealous of Pinggoy's love for Marina.

== Magical objects ==
- Aram is a sentient stone with an orange glow kept in a small chest, which originally belonged to Tandang Ella. It was given to Victoria in exchange for helping the old witch find her daughter Dugong. It is capable of tapping into the power of the Earth or sealing other people within itself, among other things. It was eventually obliterated by Tandang Ella, who destroyed it from the inside when Victoria sealed her and Dugong within.
- Latigo ni Luna is a whip bestowed by the Aram to Luna, it contained part of the Aram's power.
- Leafar - a liquid that can resurrect the dead.
- Batong Bignoy - a greenish crystal ball that shows events, very much like a television, only, it is soundless. It had been used by Istah and, later on, Dugong.
- Batong Malo - Initially implanted in the eyes of Shiela, this gives its host the ability to fire beams of white light through their eyes, though these beams are fatal only to Dugong. It is also capable of increasing the amount of Samared stones a person may have.
- Kwintas ni Istah - A necklace that originally belonged to Istah. When it was worn by Dugong, it also served as a bond to Marina; whatever injury Marina suffers is also reflected in Dugong. It is a collection of stones, each with a peculiar power. The stones below were originally part of the necklace.
  - Batong Malahi - A stone similar to Malo of Shiela that can kill Dugong and that she gave to Marina, in addition to her wish to be human to protect the mermaids from Dugong.
  - Batong Samared - marble-sized stones that emit a green glow and were originally parts of Ista's necklace. They could grant wishes, allow its wielder to access the power of the seas and were capable of erecting domelike shields. They were the only stones that could stand up to the power of the Aram.
  - Batong Okiek - it has the power to turn a person into a mermaid.
- Rodenit a very powerful, large forklike object owned by King Poseidon of the dagat ng post.
- Bituing Kasang-alam - a fragment of a falling star, it has the power to grant almost all of its owner's wishes unlimitedly. After the Aram was destroyed, Victoria got one half of it, which can only be used for evil while Marina got the other half from Ignarva, Dugong's long lost sister: the half was meant to be used only for good. Like the Aram, it was also sentient.
- Mutya Ng Sena - a very powerful stone that had the power to annihilate the whole clan of Dugong. It was the stone that killed Victoria.
- Sabaw Ng Okob - a magical liquid that can also resurrect the dead. It was once owned by a prince, he was supposed to use it to bring back his dead wife to life but was not able to. Esther used it to bring Marina back to life, but Victoria intercepted it to resurrect herself after she died from the Mutya Ng Sena.
- Tenadote - a magical liquid that Luna used to break the mermaid curse from baby Mariluna.

== Production ==
Three mermaid tails were made for Claudine Barretto to play her character, Marina: two for the water and one for land. The ones for the water were heavy for the actress to wear, and sometimes required four to six people to carry her. The one tail made for land was not as difficult for the actress: she was able to move, and could take it off if she needed to.

Sheryn Regis was chosen to sing the theme song of the series, a song composed by Raul Mitra and Cacai Velasquez-Mitra entitled "Kailan Kaya", which later became a big hit as part of Sheryn's debut album under Star Music entitled Come In Out of the Rain.

== Reception ==
This show started the fantaserye (fantasy series) mania in the Philippines. According to AGB Neilsen, Marina recorded a staggering 50.8% ratings nationwide, becoming the 26th highest rated Philippine television series in history.

== Trivia about this fantaserye ==
- Marina is considered to be the very first fantaserye ever produced drama serials in the Philippines. Also one of the highest rated teleserye of ABS-CBN.
- This is the comeback of Claudine Barretto after she have a break on making weeknights teleserye with the same production staff since Mula sa Puso and after Sa Dulo ng Walang Hanggan in 2003.
- The role of Meryll Soriano, Luna was supposed to be Rica Peralejo but she refused the role.

== Accolades ==
- 2004 PMPC Star Awards for TV "Best Primetime-Drama Series"
- 2004 PMPC Star Awards for TV "Best Female New TV Personality" (Pauleen Luna)
- 2004 Catholic Mass Media Awards for "Outstanding Drama Series"
