= What I Do Best =

Studio album by Sheryn Regis
- Released: July 2005 (Philippines)
- Recorded: 2005
- Genre: P-pop
- Length: 41:55
- Label: Star Records
- Producer: Jonathan Manalo

Sheryn Regis chronology
Come In Out of the Rain (2004)	What I Do Best (2005)	The Modern Jukebox Collection (2006)

Professional ratings
Review scores
Source	Rating
TitikPilipino	4/5 stars

What I Do Best is Sheryn Regis' second studio album under Star Records, released in July 2005 in the Philippines.It was her 2nd best selling album up to date which it sold over 15,000 copies and certified as gold by Philippine Association of the Record Industry.The album produce chart topping singles. It was 7th best selling album for 2005

The album was made available on digital download thru iTunes, Amazon and Mymusicstore.

== Album information ==
The album's carrier single bears the same title as the album itself and is a cover of a Robin S. original. Other cover songs on the album include Lani Hall's "I Don't Want You to Go", Diana Ross' "When You Tell Me That You Love Me", Roberta Flack's "If Ever I See You Again", and Whitney Houston's "Try It on My Own".

Four of the ten tracks in the album have been selected as theme songs for television shows and a movie. The duet with Erik Santos entitled Now That I Have You became the theme song of the movie bearing the same title starring love tandem John Lloyd Cruz and Bea Alonzo. Hindi Ko Kayang Iwan Ka was chosen as the love theme song of Kristine Hermosa and TJ Trinidad's remake of Gulong ng Palad which won most popular song from this album and awarded by S Magazine as Song of the Year along with "Sa Piling Mo" as the wedding song. Sabihin Mo Sa Akin was the theme song of Anne Curtis' Kampanerang Kuba, and finally, Dahil Nagmamahal became the theme song of ABS-CBN afternoon program for Filipino workers abroad entitled Nagmamahal, Kapamilya hosted by Bernadette Sembrano.And. her carrier single, What I do Best won as Best Song Performed by a Female Artist given by iFM Pinoy Music Awards.

== Track listing ==
1. What I Do Best - (04:16)
2. Sa Piling Mo - (04:23)
3. I Don't Want You to Go - (04:04)
4. Now That I Have You (Duet with Erik Santos) - (04:25)
5. Hindi Ko Kayang Iwan Ka - (04:18)
6. Sabihin Mo Sa Akin - (04:10)
7. When You Tell Me That You Love Me - (04:07)
8. Dahil Nagmamahal - (03:40)
9. If Ever I See You Again - (03:54)
10. Try It on My Own - (04:38)

=== Singles chart positions ===
Year	Single	Peak chart positions		
Year	Single	Myx Music Count Down	WRR 101.9	MOR Top Hits
2005	"What I Do Best	1	1	1
2005	"Hindi Ko Kayang Iwan Ka"	1	1	1
2005	"Sa Piling Mo	3	2	1
2005	"Nagmamahal Kapamilya"	5	1	1
2005	"Sabihin Mo Sa Akin"	5	1	1

== Certifications ==
Region	Certification	Certified units/sales
Philippines (PARI)	Gold	15,000^{*}
^{*} Sales figures based on certification alone.

== Awards and nominations ==
Year	Award giving body	Category	Result
2006	iFM Pinoy Music Awards	Best Song by a Female Performer ("What I Do Best")	Won
2006	iFM Pinoy Music Awards	Texter's Choice Awardee ("Sheryn Regis")	Won
2006	S-Magazine's Readers' Choice Awards	Song of the Year ("Hindi Ko Kayang Iwan Ka")	Won
