= Věra Waldes =

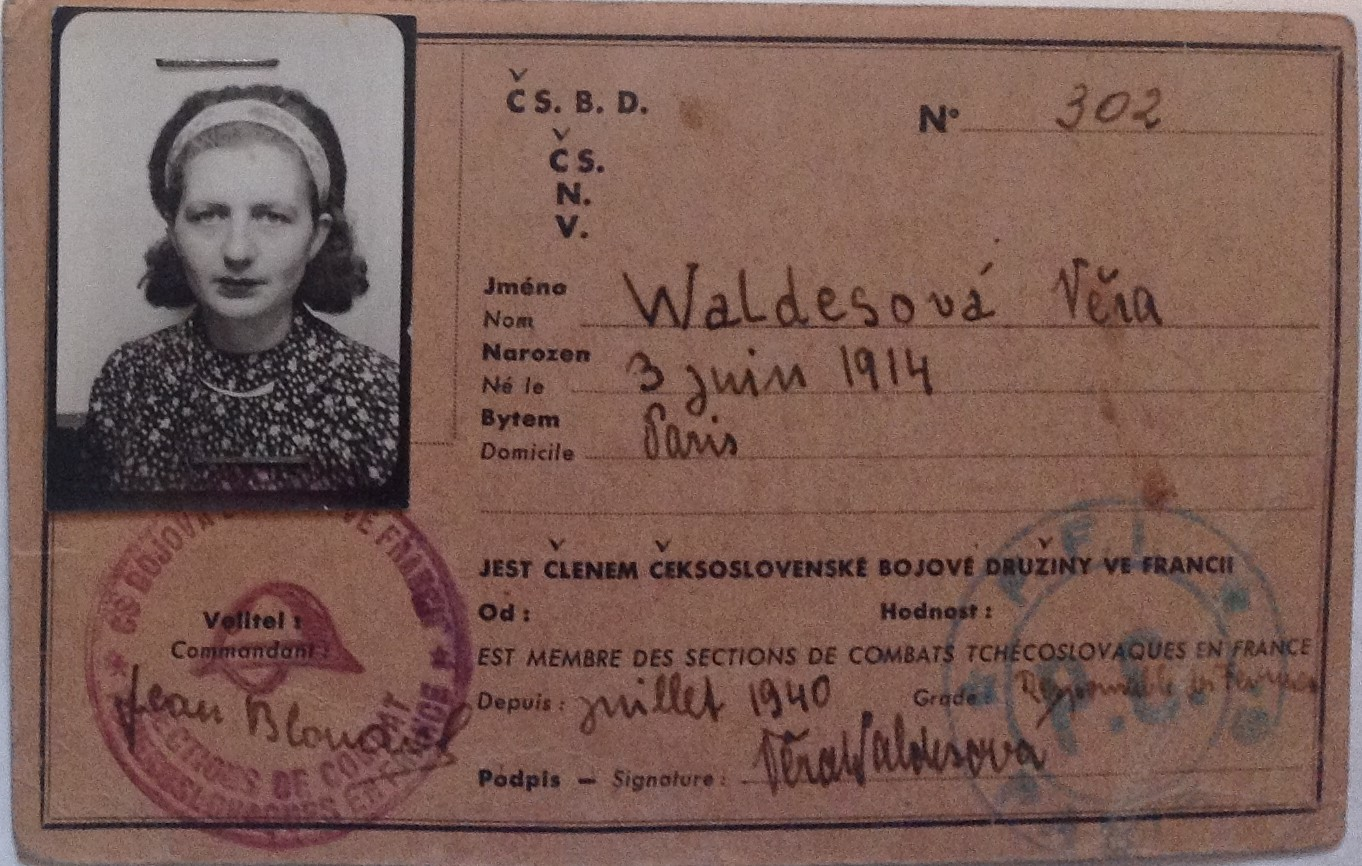
Hromadkova's resistance ID during World War II in France

Věra Waldes - Hromádková (3 June 1914 – 24 November 1995) was a prominent fighter in communist anti-nazi resistance in Paris during World War II.

== Biography ==
She was born in Dresden to Zikmund Waldes, who was a wealthy Czech entrepreneur and brother of Jindřich Waldes. She refused to emigrate to the United States with her family and instead joined anti-nazi resistance in France. In Paris she met and married one of the leaders of Czech resistance in Paris region, Otakar Hromádko. Between 1945 and 1968 she lived in Czechoslovakia and after the Warsaw Pact invasion of Czechoslovakia in 1968 she emigrated to Switzerland.

After the Velvet Revolution in 1989, she attempted to regain a part of her family property in the Czech Republic. In 2009 courts found in favor of the Waldes' restitution claim concerning the Koh-i-noor snap button factory in Prague, which was seized, along with twenty paintings, in 1939 during the Nazi occupation; however in 2010 the Constitution Court overturned the ruling.
