= The Modern Jukebox Collection =

Studio album by Sheryn Regis
- Released: November 2006 (Philippines)
- Recorded: 2006
- Genre: P-pop
- Length: 42:43
- Label: Star Records
- Producer: Jonathan Manalo

Sheryn Regis chronology
What I Do Best (2005)	The Modern Jukebox Collection (2006)	Starting Over Again (2008)

Professional ratings
Review scores
Source	Rating
TitikPilipino	2.5/5 stars
OPMusikahan	4/5 stars

The Modern Jukebox Collection is Sheryn Regis' third studio album under Star Records, released in November 2006.

== Album information ==
The album contains a combination of remakes of classic Filipino hits and originals. Among the album's remakes are Leah Navarro's Ang Pag-ibig Kong Ito (which is the album's carrier single), Vina Morales' Alam Mo Ba, Manilyn Reynes' Sayang na Sayang, Linda Eder's After All, and Joey Albert's I Remember the Boy.

Maria Flordeluna is the theme song of ABS-CBN bearing the same title starring Eliza Pineda. I Remember the Boy was chosen as the love theme song of the character Jasmine (played by Kim Chiu) in Sana Maulit Muli, together with Travis (played by Gerald Anderson).

Pusong Lito is written and composed by Sheryn Regis and is her very first self-composition from any of her studio albums. It is used for ABS-CBN Cebu's "Summer Sunshine" during summer season.

The album also contains minus one tracks of Ang Pag-ibig Kong Ito, Alam Mo Ba, Sayang na Sayang, After All, I Remember the Boy, and Pusong Lito.

Sheryl sang "Ang Lahat Para Sa'Yo" as the theme song for El Cuerpo in 2008.

== Track listing ==
1. Ang Pag-ibig Kong Ito - (03:53)
2. Alam Mo Ba - (03:27)
3. Sayang na Sayang - (03:52)
4. Bago Magbukas - (03:54)
5. After All - (04:36)
6. Bakit Iniwan Mo? - (04:07)
7. Ang Lahat Para Sa'Yo - (04:02)
8. 'Di Na Ba Babalik Pa? - (03:48)
9. I Remember the Boy - (03:57)
10. Pusong Lito - (03:21)
11. [Bonus Track] Maria Flordeluna - (03:46)

Minus One:

1. Ang Pag-ibig Kong Ito
2. Alam Mo Ba
3. Sayang na Sayang
4. After All
5. I Remember the Boy
6. Pusong Lito
