= Starting Over Again (album) =

Studio album by Sheryn Regis
- Released: June 2008 (Philippines)
- Recorded: 2008
- Genre: P-pop
- Length: 41:56
- Label: Star Records
- Producer: Vehnee Saturno; Sky Gonda

Sheryn Regis chronology
The Modern Jukebox Collection (2006)	Starting Over Again (2008)

Starting Over Again is Sheryn Regis' fourth studio album under Star Records, released in June 2008.

== Album information ==
The album contains seven revivals and three originals. The covers in the album include the carrier single, entitled Starting Over Again, which was based on the Dionne Warwick version, If I'm Not in Love by Now We're Starting Over Again, Where Do Broken Hearts Go by Whitney Houston, Always by Bon Jovi, Save the Best for Last by Vanessa Williams, For Your Eyes Only by Sheena Easton, and It Must Have Been Love by Roxette.

The originals include Vehnee Saturno's Patunayan Mo, Star Records managing director Anabelle Regalado's Sana Nandito Ka, and Sheryn's very own composition with her husband entitled My Heart Beats for You.

Starting Over Again was used as the theme song of Three Dads with One Mommy.

== Track listing ==
1. If I'm Not in Love - (03:48)
2. Where Do Broken Hearts Go - (04:07)
3. Always - (04:37)
4. Starting Over Again - (04:05)
5. Save the Best for Last - (04:10)
6. For Your Eyes Only - (04:26)
7. Patunayan Mo - (03:50)
8. It Must Have Been Love - (03:59)
9. Sana Nandito Ka - (04:20)
10. My Heart Beats for You - (04:34)
