= Christmas Time (Wendy Moten album) =

EP by Wendy Moten
- Released: October 25, 1995
- Genres: R&B, pop
- Label: Toshiba

Wendy Moten chronology
Time for Change (1995)	Christmas Time (1995)	Life's What You Make It (1996)

Christmas Time is a holiday EP by the American vocalist Wendy Moten and was released on October 25, 1995; the EP included 3 new songs.

== Track listing ==
Standard edition
No.	Title	Writer(s)	Producer(s)	Length
1.	"Christmas Time"			3:42
2.	"The Christmas Song"	Mel Tormé, Robert Wells		2:40
3.	"It's Christmas"			3:57
4.	"Change of Heart"	Cliff Downs, Randy Goodrum	Downs, Goodrum, Ben Brosse, Dick Williams	4:47
5.	"So Close to Love"	Curtiss Boone		4:43
6.	"Come In Out of the Rain"	Boone, Nikos Lyras, Ernest Williamson		4:18
7.	"Forever Yours"	Boone	Dan Shea, Carole Bayer Sager, James Ingram	4:44
