= Tis (Havlíčkův Brod District) =

- Municipality
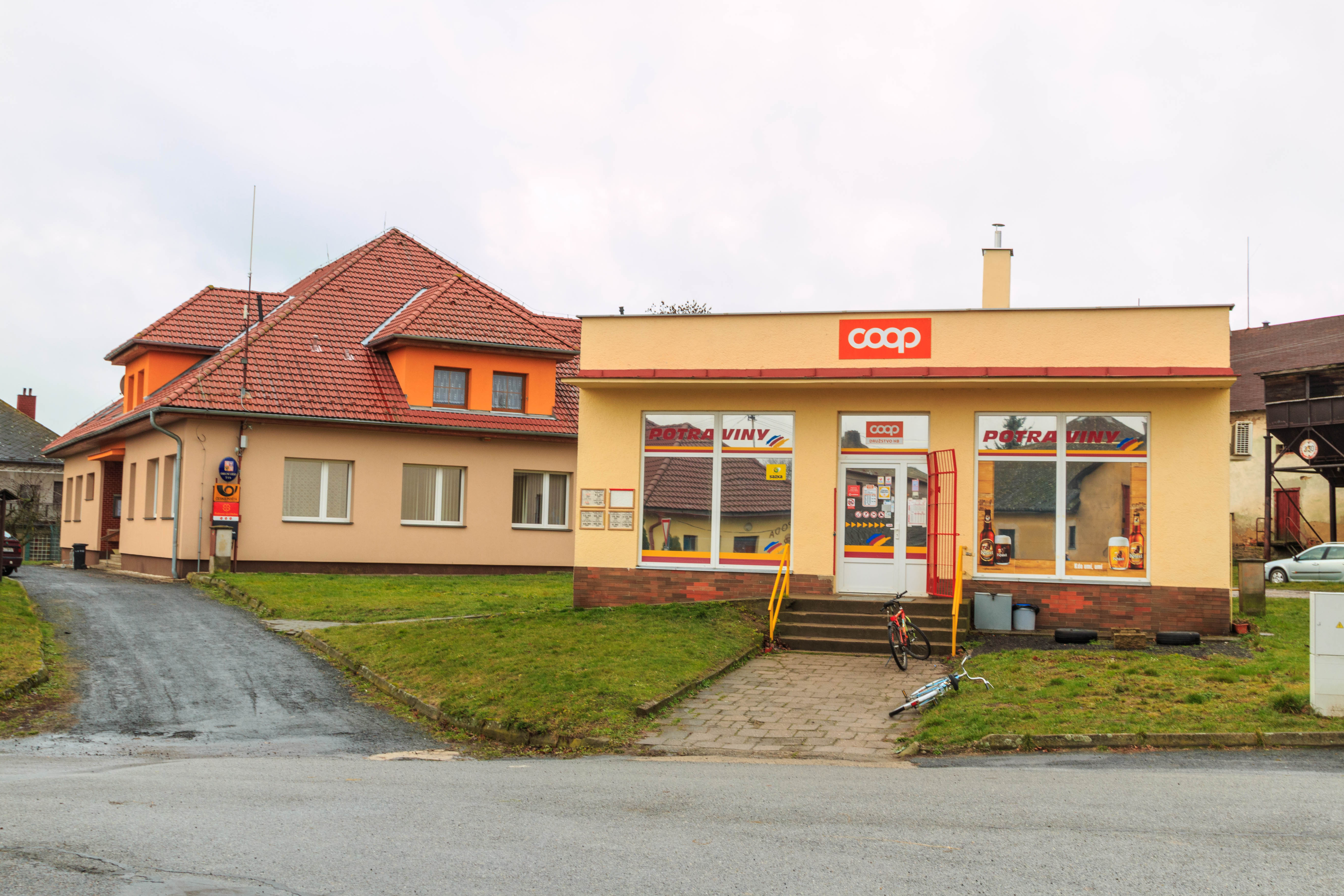
- Municipal office and grocery store

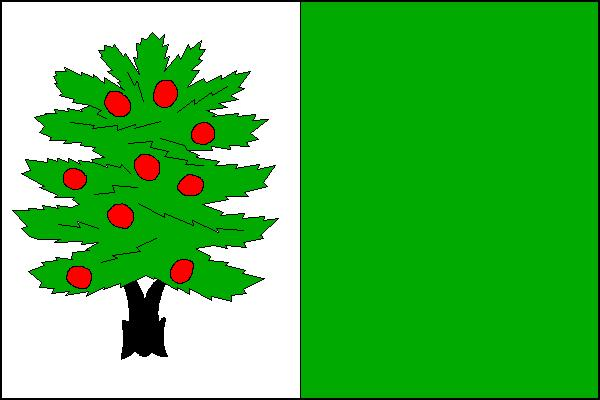
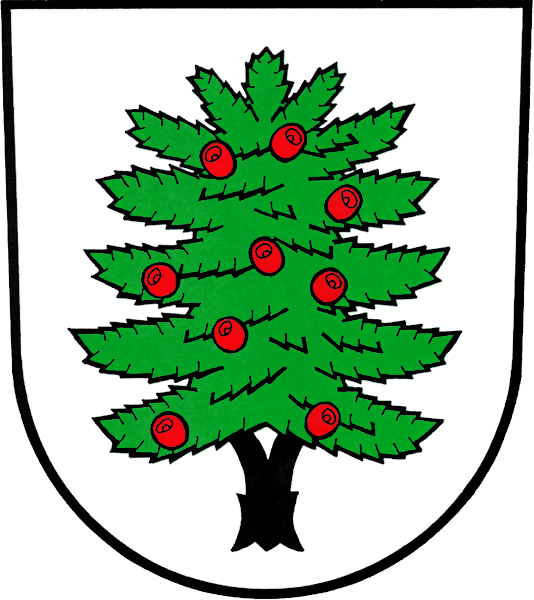
- Flag Coat of arms

- Location in the Czech Republic
- Coordinates: 49°42′18″N 15°29′36″E
- Country: Czech Republic
- Region: Vysočina
- District: Havlíčkův Brod
- First mentioned: 1426

Area
  - Total: 14.10 km^{2} (5.44 sq mi)
- Elevation: 545 m (1,788 ft)

Population (2026-01-01)
  - Total: 396
  - Density: 28.1/km^{2} (72.7/sq mi)
- Time zone: UTC+1 (CET)
  - Summer (DST): UTC+2 (CEST)
- Postal codes: 582 43, 582 91
- Website: www.obectis.cz

Tis is a municipality and village in Havlíčkův Brod District in the Vysočina Region of the Czech Republic. It has about 400 inhabitants.

Tis lies approximately 13 kilometres (8 mi) north-west of Havlíčkův Brod, 35 km (22 mi) north of Jihlava, and 88 km (55 mi) south-east of Prague.

== Administrative division ==
Tis consists of two municipal parts (in brackets population according to the 2021 census):

- Tis (292)
- Kněž (76)

== Demographics ==
Historical population
Year	Pop.	±%
1869	749	—
1880	793	+5.9%
1890	738	−6.9%
1900	776	+5.1%
1910	843	+8.6%
1921	813	−3.6%
1930	737	−9.3%
1950	590	−19.9%
1961	581	−1.5%
1970	520	−10.5%
1980	478	−8.1%
1991	401	−16.1%
2001	362	−9.7%
2011	358	−1.1%
2021	368	+2.8%
Source: Censuses

== Notable people ==
- Otakar Hromádko (1909–1983), journalist and army officer
