= Wendy Moten (album) =

Studio album by Wendy Moten
- Released: 1992
- Genre: R&B
- Length: 43:58
- Label: EMI
- Producers: Charles Farrar; Ben Grosse; Niko Lyras; Troy Taylor

Wendy Moten chronology
Wendy Moten (1992)	Time for Change (1995)

Singles from Wendy Moten
- 1. "Come In Out of the Rain" Released: 1992; 2. "So Close to Love" Released: 1993

Wendy Moten is the debut album by the American R&B singer Wendy Moten, released in 1992. It features the single "Come In Out of the Rain", which, although a minor hit on the US Billboard Hot 100, was an Adult Contemporary smash, peaking at number 5. It had similar success in the UK Singles Chart, where it peaked at number 8 when released two years after the US release. A second single from the album, "So Close to Love" also charted in the UK in 1994, peaking at number 35.

== Critical reception ==
Professional ratings
Review scores
Source	Rating
AllMusic	3/5 stars
Music Week	3/5 stars

In a review for AllMusic, Steve Huey gave the album three out of five stars, saying that the album "displays a confident vocalist with a theatrical flair" and that "Moten is equally comfortable with urban R&B and smooth adult contemporary balladry, although her true affinity seems to be for the latter."

== Track listing ==
No.	Title	Writer(s)	Producer(s)	Length
1.	"A Matter of Fact"	Robbie Nevil, Steve Dubin	Homemade Productions and Nikos Lyras	3:29
2.	"Nobody But You"	Nikos Lyras, Dick Williams, Ernest Williamson	Nikos Lyras	3:41
3.	"So Close to Love"	Curtiss Boone	Nikos Lyras	4:43
4.	"Step by Step (Gonna Make You Mine)"	Troy Taylor, Charles Farrar	The Characters; Ben Grosse	3:29
5.	"Forever Yours"	Boone	Nikos Lyras	3:42
6.	"Whatever It Takes" (Duet with Michael Webb)	Lyras, Williamson, Wendy Moten	Nikos Lyras	4:36
7.	"Come In Out of the Rain"	Boone, Lyras, Williamson	Nikos Lyras	4:18
8.	"Make This Love Last"	Boone	Nikos Lyras	3:50
9.	"Magic Touch"	Boone	Nikos Lyras	4:14
10.	"Wonderin'"	Vini Poncia, Alfredo Scotti	Nikos Lyras	3:49
11.	"Once Upon a Time"	Boone	Nikos Lyras	4:24

Japanese bonus tracks
No.	Title	Writer(s)	Length
12.	"Aretha Franklin Medley (Live)"
13.	"Still It's You (Live)"	Michael Gore, Carole Bayer Sager
14.	"Come In Out of the Rain (Live)"	Boone, Lyras, Williamson

== Personnel and production ==
As adapted from the album's liner notes:

- Track 1 – produced by Homemade Productions, with additional vocal production by Nikos Lyras. Recording Engineers: Barry Rudolph, Walter Balfour and Matt King. Mixed by Ben Grosse. Steve Dubin: drums, percussion; Tim Heintz: keyboards; Puff Johnson: background vocals
- Tracks 2, 3 and 5-11 – arranged, produced and recorded by Nikos Lyras for Thunderbird Records; with recording assistance on track 6 by Doug Night Wine, Ben Grosse on tracks 4, 7 and 11, Matt King on tracks 8 and 10 and Walter Balfour on tracks 10 and 11. Tracks 2, 3, 5, 6, 7, 9 and 11 mixed by Ben Grosse. Tracks 8 and 10 mixed by Ben Grosse and Nikos Lyras. Nikos Lyras: guitars, keyboards, keyboard and rhythm programming; Ernest Williamson: keyboards and rhythm programming; Slice Tee: DJ/scratching; Dave Smith: bass; Steve Potts: drums, percussion; Pat Register, Najee: saxophone; background vocals and vocal arrangements: The Ridgeway Sisters
- Track 4 – arranged and produced by The Characters (Troy Taylor and Charles Farrar), with additional production by Ben Grosse. Recorded and mixed by Ben Grosse. Curtis Matthewson: guitars; Luis Resto: keyboards; Troy Taylor: drums, percussion, background vocals; Couture & The Flow: background vocals

== Charts ==
=== Weekly charts ===
Chart (1994)	Peak position
UK Albums Chart	42
