= Time for Change (album) =

Time For Change

Studio album by Wendy Moten
- Released: February 22, 1995
- Recorded: 1993–1994
- Studios: The Village Recorder, Brooklyn Studios and Record Plant (Los Angeles, California); Conway Studios (Hollywood, California); The Plant Studios (Sausalito, California); Chartmaker Studios (Malibu, California); Milagro Studios (Houston, Texas); Vanguard Studios (Detroit, Michigan); Pearl Sound Studios (Canton, Michigan); North Beach Studios and The Bennett House (Franklin, Tennessee); Classic Recordings Ltd and Emerald Sound Studios (Nashville, Tennessee); Marcus Recording Studios (London, UK)
- Genre: R&B
- Length: 52:44
- Labels: Toshiba; EMI
- Producers: Cliff Downs; David Foster; James Ingram; Nigel Lowis; Michael J. Powell; Carole Bayer-Sager; Bruce Roberts; Dan Shea; Keith Thomas; Aaron Zigman

Wendy Moten chronology
Wendy Moten (1992)	Time For Change (1995)	Christmas Time (1995)

Time For Change is the second album by American R&B singer Wendy Moten, released on February 22, 1995.

== Overview ==
Although none of the album's singles charted in Moten's native United States or the United Kingdom where she had a Top 10 hit with "Come In Out of the Rain" the year before, the album did prove successful in Japan, where she scored two smash hits; "Change of Heart", which reached number 1, and "Your Love Is All I Know", which peaked at number 2.

== Track listing ==
Standard edition
No.	Title	Writer(s)	Producer(s)	Length
1.	"Your Love Is All I Know"	Jud Friedman, Allan Rich, Chris Walker	David Foster	4:45
2.	"Forever Yours"	Carole Bayer Sager, James Ingram, Bruce Roberts	Dan Shea, Sager, Ingram, Roberts	4:44
3.	"Change of Heart"	Cliff Downs, Randy Goodrum	Downs, Goodrum, Ben Brosse, Dick Williams	4:47
4.	"Hear the Angels Cry"	Barry Mann, Cynthia Weil	Shea	5:35
5.	"Comin' Back" (Duet with Keith John)	Les Pierce, Rashaan Patterson	Michael J. Powell	4:48
6.	"Time for Change"	Aaron Zigman, Brock Walsh	Zigman	3:59
7.	"Consider This Love"	Downs, Cheryl Rodgers	Downs, Brosse, Williams	4:59
8.	"This Will Never End"	Anne Preven, Jeff Hull	Nigel Lowis	4:45
9.	"When You Love Someone"	Boone, Powell	Powell	4:41
10.	"Sharin' My Love"	Boone	Powell	4:48
11.	"All That My Heart Can Hold"	Foster, Linda Thompson, Richard Marx, Jeremy Lubbock	Foster	4:50
Total length:				52:41

European edition
No.	Title	Writer(s)	Producer(s)	Length
1.	"Your Love Is All I Know"	Friedman, Rich, Walker	Foster	4:45
2.	"Forever Yours"	Sager, Ingram, Roberts	Shea, Sager, Ingram, Roberts	4:44
3.	"Whatever You Imagine"	Mann, James Horner, Weil	Keith Thomas	3:28
4.	"Hear the Angels Cry"	Mann, Weil	Shea	5:35
5.	"Comin' Back" (Duet with Keith John)	Pierce, Patterson	Powell	4:48
6.	"Time for Change"	Zigman, Walsh	Zigman	3:59
7.	"Consider This Love"	Downs, Rodgers	Downs, Brosse, Williams	4:59
8.	"This Will Never End"	Preven, Hull	Lowis	4:45
9.	"When You Love Someone"	Boone, Powell	Powell	4:41
10.	"Sharin' My Love"	Boone	Powell	4:48
11.	"All That My Heart Can Hold"	Foster, Thompson, Marx, Lubbock	Foster	4:50
Total length:				51:22

== Personnel ==
- Wendy Moten – lead vocals, backing vocals
- David Foster – keyboards (1, 11), bass (1, 11), arrangements (1, 11)
- Simon Franglen – Synclavier Programming (1), drums (1)
- Dan Shea – keyboards (2, 4), Moog bass (2, 4), Macintosh programming (2, 4), drum programming (2, 4), rhythm programming (2, 4), arrangements (2, 4), additional percussion (4)
- Gary Cirimelli – Macintosh programming (2, 4), Synclavier programming (2, 4)
- Ren Klyce – Roland Juno-106 (2, 4), Akai AX60 programming (2, 4), Synclavier programming (2, 4)
- Robbie Buchanan – keyboards (3), synthesizers (3)
- Randy Goodrum – acoustic piano (3)
- Cliff Downs – keyboard programming (3, 7), percussion programming (3, 7)
- Jerome Howard – keyboards (5, 10), acoustic piano (9)
- Michael J. Powell – keyboard programming (5, 8–10), guitars (5, 8–10), keyboards (8–10), percussion (9, 10)
- Paul D. Allen – keyboard programming (5, 9, 10), drum programming (5, 8, 10)
- Aaron Zigman – acoustic piano (6), string arrangements (6)
- Cheryl Rogers – acoustic piano (7), keyboard programming (7), percussion programming (7)
- Eddie Howard – keyboards (8), bass (8)
- Vernon D. Fails – keyboards (9), acoustic piano (9)
- Curtiss Boone – keyboards (10), keyboard programming (10), bass (10)
- Claude Gaudette – Fairlight synthesizer programming (11)
- Tony Smith – Kurzweil programming (11), Synclavier programming (11)
- Michael Thompson – guitars (1, 2, 11)
- Donnie Lyle – guitars (3, 5, 7, 8)
- Dann Huff – acoustic guitar (4)
- Jackie Street – bass (3, 7)
- Ray Burton – bass (5)
- Al Turner – bass (9)
- Arthur "Buster" Marbury – drums (3, 5, 7, 9, 10)
- Vinnie Colaiuta – drums (11)
- Michael Fisher – percussion (6)
- Kirk Whalum – tenor saxophone (2)
- Mark Douthit – saxophone (7)
- Benjamin "Skip" Pruitt – saxophone (9)
- Gary Grant – flugelhorn (6)
- Jerry Hey – flugelhorn (6), flugelhorn and string arrangements (6), string conductor (6)
- Katie Kirkpatrick – harp (6)
- Jeremy Lubbock – string arrangements and conductor (11)
- Daryl Gardine – backing vocals (5)
- Deron Irons – backing vocals (5)
- Keith John – vocals (5), backing vocals (5)
- Gerald Kinchelow – backing vocals (5)
- Esther Ridgeway – backing vocals (9)
- Gloria Ridgeway – backing vocals (9)
- Gracie Ridgeway – backing vocals (9)

Musicians on "Whatever You Imagine"

- Keith Thomas – acoustic piano, electric piano, synthesizers, bass programming, string arrangements
- Dann Huff – guitars
- Mark Hammond – drum programming
- The Nashville String Machine – strings
- Ronn Huff – string arrangements and conductor
- Pamela Sixfin – string contractor
- Barry Mann – arrangements
- Guy Moon – arrangements

== Production ==
- Jay Landers – executive producer (1–4, 11)
- Walter Afanasieff – executive producer (2, 4)
- Jeff Aldrich – executive producer (2)
- Dick Williams – executive producer (2, 5–7, 9, 10), management
- Marsha Burns – production coordinator (2)
- Todd Moore – production coordinator ("Whatever You Imagine")
- Nancy Roof – A&R coordinator
- Henry Marquez – art direction
- Lu Ann Graffeo – design
- Wayne Kruse – design
- Paul Cox – photography
- Steve Moir – management

Technical credits

- Vlado Meller – mastering at Sony Music Studios (New York, NY)
- Mark Pastoria – digital editing (9, 10)
- David Reitzas – engineer (1), recording (2, 4)
- Mick Guzauski – mixing (1)
- Paul Brown – recording (2)
- Dana Jon Chappelle – recording (2, 4), mixing (2, 4)
- David Gleeson – recording (2, 4)
- Bill Bingham – recording (3, 7)
- Cliff Downs – recording (3, 7)
- Ben Grosse – recording (3, 7), mixing (3, 7)
- David Dillbeck – recording (3, 7)
- Dave Skryznski – recording (3, 7)
- Paul D. Allen – recording (5, 8–10)
- Michael J. Powell – recording (5, 8–10), mixing (5, 8, 10)
- Gerard Smerek – mixing (5, 8, 10), recording (9, 10)
- Daren Klein – recording (6)
- Humberto Gatica – mixing (6, 11), recording (11)
- Bill Whittington – recording and mixing ("Whatever You Imagine")
- Van Coppock – assistant engineer (1)
- Gil Morales – mix assistant (1)
- Marnie Riley – second engineer (2)
- Ronnie Rivera – second engineer (2, 4)
- Clell Moore – second engineer (5, 8)
- Bruce Woods – second engineer (5)
- Dwayne Jones – assistant engineer (8)
- Brandon Harris – assistant engineer (11)
- Tim Mariner – assistant engineer (11)
- Matt Stephens – assistant engineer (11)
- Alejandro Rodriguez – mix assistant (11)
- Felipe Elgueta – additional engineer (11)
- Grant Greene – assistant engineer ("Whatever You Imagine")
- Greg Parker – assistant engineer ("Whatever You Imagine")
- Tim Waters – assistant engineer ("Whatever You Imagine")

== Charts ==
Chart performance for Time for Change
Chart (1995)	Peak position
Japan (Oricon)	18
