= Wendy Moten =

American musician

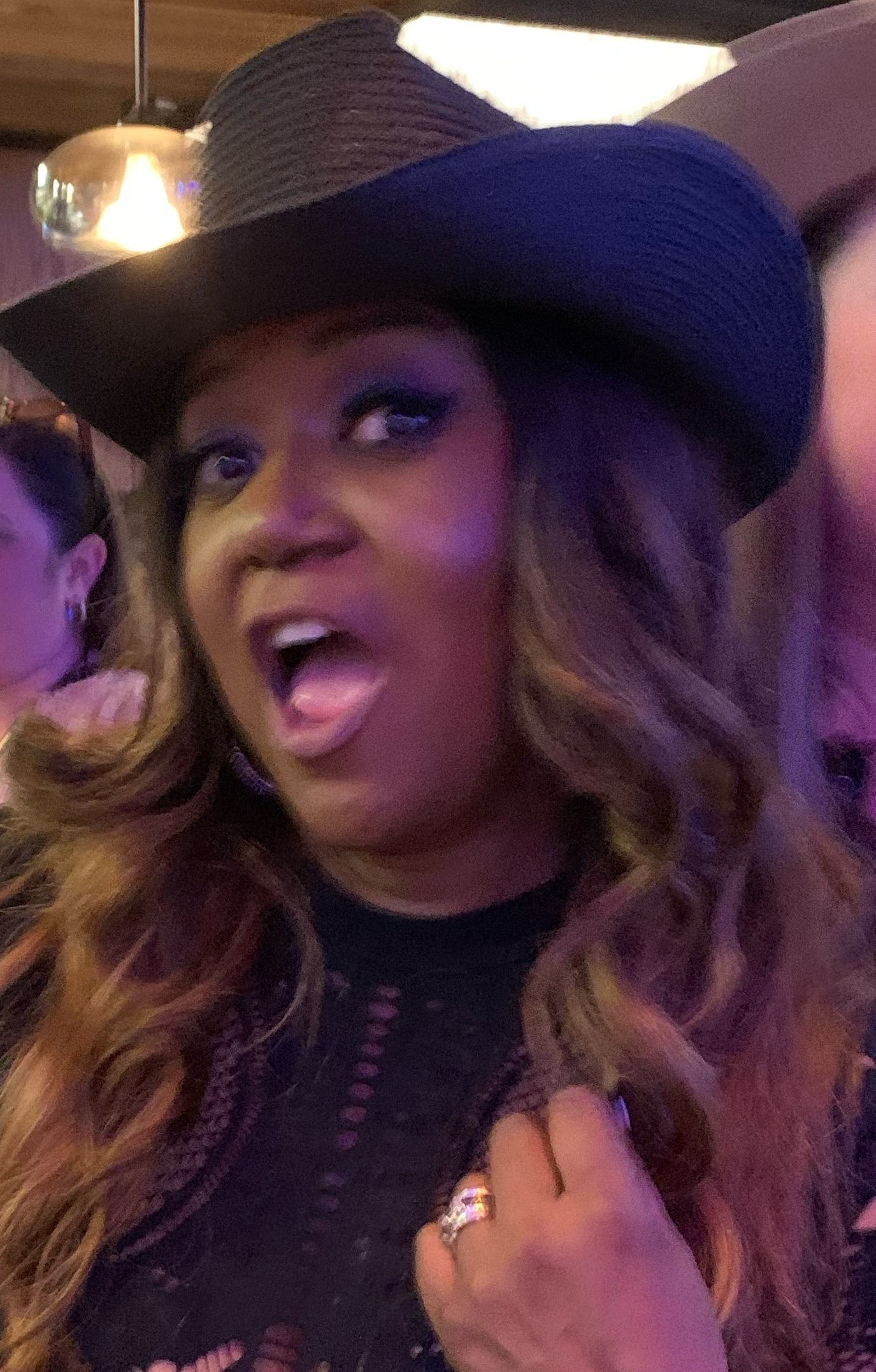
- Wendy Moten at Wildhorse Saloon, June 2023.

Background information
- Born: November 22, 1964 (age 61); Memphis, Tennessee, US
- Genres: R&B; soul; rock; jazz; country soul
- Occupations: Solo artist, vocalist, performer
- Years active: 1992–present
- Labels: EMI, Vital, IRS
- Website: wendymoten.com

Wendy Moten (born November 22, 1964) is an American singer. Born in Memphis and based in Nashville, Moten has had a successful career in music, including several major-label solo records, some international hit songs, and a second career as a touring musician.

At age 56, she entered the American national talent competition The Voice. She finished as the runner-up on the show, but her career was buoyed by the national exposure. Moten is best known for the single "Come In Out of the Rain", which was a No. 8 hit in the UK in February 1994.

== Early life and career ==
The daughter of a pastor, Moten, who is of African American heritage, began singing in a church choir as a child. She attended Overton High School in Memphis and sang in the Overton Choir under the direction of the late Lulah M. Hedgeman. She won a Mid-South Fair singing competition at age 16, and got a job singing at a theme park. She attended Memphis State University (now the University of Memphis) as a music business major at the Rudi E. Scheidt School of Music. She was discovered by promo man Dick Williams who heard her as she was singing on a jingle in a Memphis studio. She got her first break singing with Michael Bolton at a benefit concert; after signing with EMI, in 1992 she released her self-titled debut album and opened for Bolton on tour. Moten's biggest hit single was "Come In Out of the Rain", which, although only peaking at #55 in 1993 on the Billboard Hot 100, was a No. 5 adult contemporary hit, and also reached the Top 10 in the UK Singles Chart, where it peaked at No. 8 in 1994. A follow-up single, "So Close to Love" did not chart in the U.S. but reached No. 35 in the UK Top 40. She had a starring role in an off-Broadway production, "Mama I Want to Sing". Moten also landed a feature song "Whatever You Imagine" in children's movie The Pagemaster starring Macaulay Culkin in 1994. In the late 1990s, with her personal career at a crossroads, she accepted an offer to tour with Julio Iglesias, a working relationship that continued for the next 15 years. She said, "I toured the whole world with him, singing in four languages . . . flying around in private jets and singing in front of massive audiencies."

In 2006, Moten sang back-up vocals on the Soul2Soul II Tour with Tim McGraw and Faith Hill. She continued touring with McGraw and Hill from 2005-2018. She contributed backing vocals to Bonnie Tyler's 2013 album Rocks and Honey. She also toured with Martina McBride from 2014-2016 providing background vocals. Moten was a harmony singer for Vince Gill and was a member of Time Jumpers for several years, but in 2020, Gill took her on tour as a featured vocalist.

== The Voice ==
Moten said that in 2020, when the COVID-19 pandemic shut down the touring business and live music venues, she found her career to be at a critical juncture. She was not sure that her lucrative work as a backup singer on high-profile tours would be still be in existence. When the chance for The Voice came, Moten said, "Deciding to do The Voice was hard. Because I've been on a certain level for like 30-plus years... and to be in a situation where you are trying to get people to love you and vote for you...it's tough. But decided to take a risk". Moten competed in the 21st season of The Voice and finished as the runner-up of the season. While working on the show, Moten fell over a monitor, fracturing her elbow. She was told at a Burbank hospital that it would require surgery, but she was determined to remain on the show for 3 more episodes and then had surgery to repair the fracture with titanium plates. As of 2022, Moten is assembling a professional team to help re-launch her solo career following the surge in her media exposure on the show.

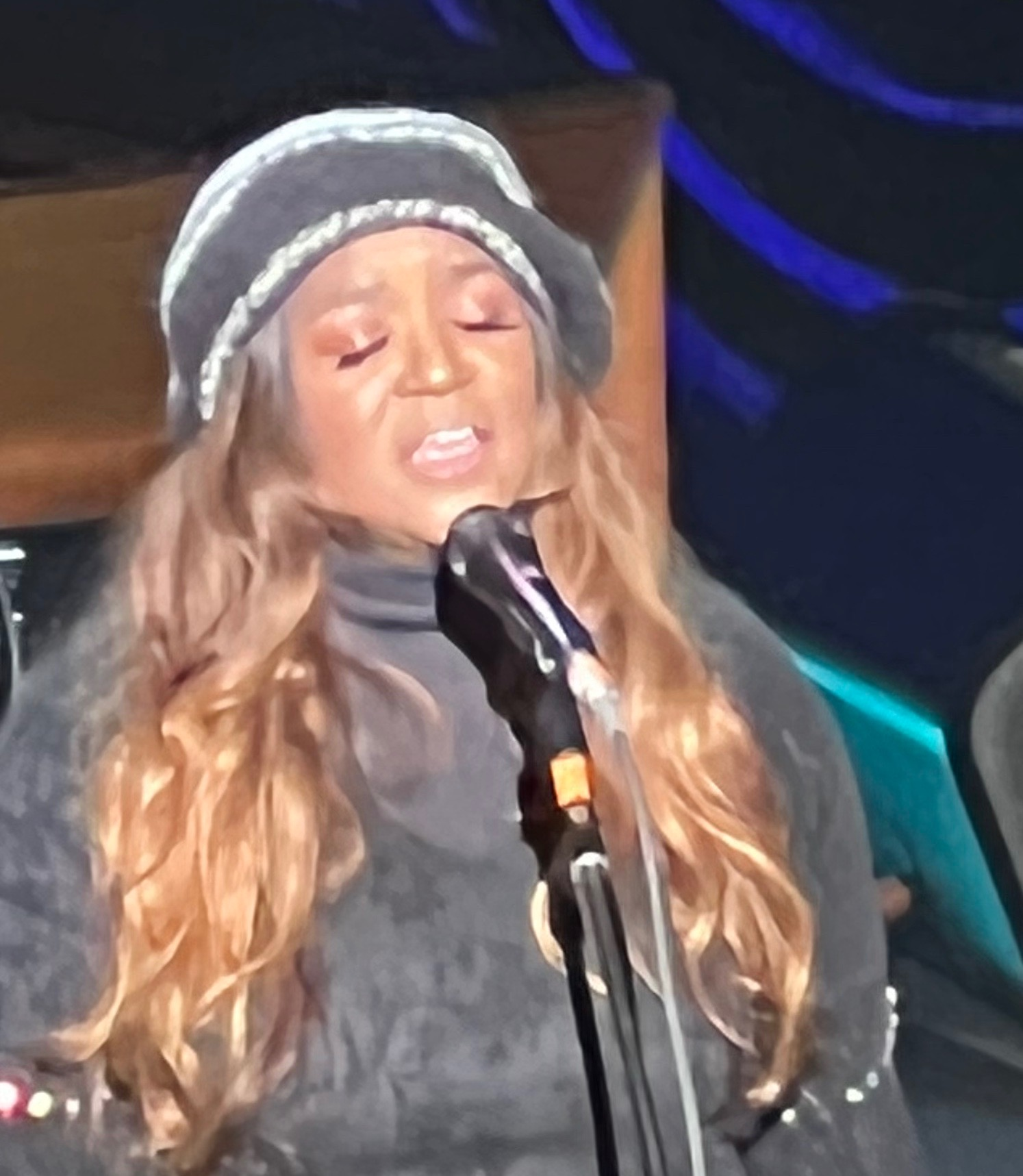
Wendy Moten at Ryman Auditorium, Nashville, August 4, 2022

Performances on The Voice season 21
Round	Theme	Song	Original Artist	Order	Original Air Date	Result
Blind Auditions	—N/a	"We Can Work It Out"	The Beatles	1.11	September 20, 2021	All four chairs turned; John Legend blocked; joined Team Blake
Battles (Top 48)	—N/a	"If I Ever Lose My Faith in You" (vs. Manny Keith)	Sting	9.9	October 18, 2021	Saved by coach
Knockouts (Top 32)	—N/a	"Ain't No Way" (vs. Jonathan Mouton)	Aretha Franklin	11.1	October 25, 2021	Saved by coach
Live Playoffs (Top 20)	—N/a	"I Will Always Love You"	Dolly Parton (Whitney Houston cover)	15.20	November 8, 2021	Saved by public's vote
Live Top 13	"Dedications"	"Blue Bayou"	Linda Ronstadt	17.1	November 15, 2021	Saved by public's vote
Live Top 11	"Fan Week"	"Freeway of Love"	Aretha Franklin	19.1	November 22, 2021	Saved by public's vote
Live Top 10	"Challenge Week"	"Jolene"	Dolly Parton	21.2	November 29, 2021	Saved by public's vote
Live Top 8 (Semifinals)	"'90s Duet with a fellow artist"	"Change the World" (with Paris Winningham)	Eric Clapton	23.3	December 6, 2021	Saved by public's vote
Live Top 8 (Semifinals)	—N/a	"You're All I Need to Get By"	Marvin Gaye & Tammi Terrell	23.9	December 6, 2021	Saved by public's vote
Live Finale (Final 5)	"Up-tempo Song"	"How Will I Know"	Whitney Houston	25.5	December 13, 2021	Runner-Up
Live Finale (Final 5)	"Ballad"	"Over the Rainbow"	Judy Garland (Patti LaBelle cover)	25.10	December 13, 2021	Runner-Up
Live Finale (Final 5)	"Duet with Coach"	"Just a Fool" (with Blake Shelton)	Christina Aguilera & Blake Shelton	26.15	December 14, 2021	Runner-Up

== Discography ==
- Wendy Moten (1992)
- Time for Change (1995)
- Christmas Time (1995 EP)
- Life's What You Make It (1996)
- Tis the Season (2009)
- Timeless - Wendy Moten Sings Richard Whiting (2014)
- I've Got You Covered (2020)
