= Come In Out of the Rain (song) =

1992 single by Wendy Moten

Single by Wendy Moten

from the album Wendy Moten
- B-side: "Magic Touch"; "Step by Step"
- Released: 1992
- Genre: R&B; soul
- Length: 4:15
- Label: Capitol (EMI)
- Songwriters: Nikos Lyras; Ernest Williamson; Curtiss Boone
- Producer: Nikos Lyras

Wendy Moten singles chronology
| "Step by Step" (1992) | "Come In Out of the Rain" (1992) | "So Close to Love" (1994) |

Music video
- "Come In Out of the Rain" on YouTube

"Come In Out of the Rain" is a song by American R&B singer Wendy Moten, written by Ernest Williamson, Curtiss Boone, and Nikos Lyras, who also produced the song. The song was released as the second single from Moten's self-titled debut album in 1993. One of the tracks on the British and Australian CD singles, "Step by Step", was released as Moten's debut single.

A soul ballad, "Come In Out of the Rain" received positive reviews from music critics and became Moten's most successful hit, peaking at number 55 on the US Billboard Hot 100 and number 46 on the Canadian RPM 100 Hit Tracks chart. In 1994, the song was released in Europe and Australia, reaching the top 10 in Iceland and the United Kingdom. Despite the song's success, Moten would release only one more album before being dropped by Capitol Records.

== Critical reception ==
Alan Jones from Music Week gave the song a score of three out of five, writing, "A big ballad spells a big hit for this newcomer from Memphis. Already picking up an impressive level of support from the ILR network, it's an emotional tour de force of the kind Whitney Houston favours." Tony Cross from Smash Hits commented, "Wendy is from Memphis, Tennessee, began singing in a church choir and this is her very first single. It's a Dina Carroll style Valentine's Day bid that ends up like a smoochie massacre. An assault of painfully swooning lyrics and unabashed snogging sentimentality should shove this song firmly into the 'erection section' of clubs for that final dance." Another Smash Hits editor, Leesa Daniels, praised it as "wonderful". Chris Rizik from Soultracks was also positive, calling it "beautiful" and comparing it to ballads by Houston.

== Track listings ==
- US cassette single
- UK 7-inch and cassette single
- Japanese mini-CD single
1. "Come In Out of the Rain" – 4:04 (4:15 in UK)
2. "Magic Touch" – 4:12
- UK and Australian CD single
1. "Come In Out of the Rain" – 4:15
2. "Magic Touch" – 4:12
3. "Step by Step" – 3:25

== Charts ==
=== Weekly charts ===
| Chart (1993–1994) | Peak position |
|---|---|
| Australia (ARIA) | 52 |
| Canada Top Singles (RPM) | 46 |
| Canada Adult Contemporary (RPM) | 13 |
| Europe (Eurochart Hot 100) | 29 |
| Iceland (Íslenski Listinn Topp 40) | 10 |
| Ireland (IRMA) | 22 |
| Israel (Israeli Singles Chart) | 17 |
| Netherlands (Dutch Top 40 Tipparade) | 4 |
| Netherlands (Single Top 100) | 48 |
| Scottish Singles Sales (Official Charts) | 32 |
| UK Singles (Official Charts) | 8 |
| UK Airplay (Music Week) | 4 |
| US Billboard Hot 100 | 55 |
| US Adult Contemporary (Billboard) | 5 |
| US Hot R&B Singles (Billboard) | 67 |
| US Top 40/Rhythm-Crossover (Billboard) | 38 |

=== Year-end charts ===
| Chart (1993) | Position |
|---|---|
| US Adult Contemporary (Billboard) | 31 |

| Chart (1994) | Position |
|---|---|
| UK Singles (OCC) | 90 |
| UK Airplay (Music Week) | 41 |

== Release history ==
| Region | Date | Format(s) | Label(s) | Ref. |
|---|---|---|---|---|
| United States | 1992 | Cassette | EMI | |
| Japan | April 7, 1993 | Mini-CD | EMI | |
| United Kingdom | January 24, 1994 | 7-inch vinyl; CD; cassette | EMI | |
| Australia | June 20, 1994 | CD | EMI | |
