= All That (disambiguation) =

All That is an American comedy television series.

All That may also refer to:

== Episodes ==
- List of All That episodes, an episode list
  - All That season 1, the first season
  - All That season 2, the second season
  - All That season 3, the third season
  - All That season 4, the fourth season
  - All That season 5, the fifth season
  - All That season 6, the sixth season
  - All That season 7, the seventh season
  - All That season 8, the eighth season
  - All That season 9, the ninth season
  - All That season 10, the tenth season
  - All That season 11, the eleventh season

== Music ==
- All That: The Album, the soundtrack
- All That (album), an album by LeAnn Rimes
- "All That" (song), a song by Carly Rae Jepsen from her 2015 album Emotion
- "All That (Lady)", a song by The Game
- "All That", a song by Ab-Soul from the album Soul Burger
- "All That", a song by Dillon Francis from the album Money Sucks, Friends Rule
- "All That", a song by Jake Bugg from the album On My One
- "All That", a song by Zayn from the album Icarus Falls

== Other uses ==
- All That: Fresh out the Box, a book about the TV show
- All That Skate, a figure skating show
