= All That season 11 =

All That
- Season 11
- Starring: Ryan Alessi; Aria Brooks; Reece Caddell; Kate Godfrey; Gabrielle Nevaeh Green; Nathan Janak; Lex Lumpkin; Chinguun Sergelen
- No. of episodes: 35

Release
- Original network: Nickelodeon
- Original release: June 15, 2019 – December 17, 2020

Season chronology
- ← Previous; Season 10

The eleventh and final season of the Nickelodeon sketch-comedy series All That aired from June 15, 2019, to December 17, 2020. This season marked the first time that the show, created by Brian Robbins and Mike Tollin, had aired new episodes since 2005.

Kevin Kay, Rebecca Drysdale, Jermaine Fowler, series co-creator Mike Tollin, and former cast members Kenan Thompson and Kel Mitchell all returned for the revival as executive producers, while the duo of Kevin Kopelow and Heath Seifert, who previously served as executive producers and wrote many recurring sketches during the original run, served as consulting producers and returned as writers. In addition to Kopelow and Seifert, the writing staff for the revival also consisted of Tim Barnes, Joey Manderino, Steven Borzachillo, Liz Magee, and the duo of Monica Sherer and Madeline Whitby. The directing staff consisted of Jonathan Judge, Trevor Kirschner, Phill Lewis, Eric Dean Seaton, Robbie Countryman, Sandra Restrepo, and Lynda Tarryk. Like the first 10 seasons, this season was shot before a live audience.

The revival featured an entirely new cast, consisting of Nathan Janak, Kate Godfrey, Lex Lumpkin, Chinguun Sergelen, Reece Caddell, Ryan Alessi, Gabrielle Nevaeh Green, and Aria Brooks. Brooks joined midway through the season, making her debut in the season's 15th episode on January 18, 2020. This run also featured the involvement of former cast members appearing regularly with the new cast in sketches. Numerous classic characters and sketches, such as Good Burger, the "Loud Librarian", and "Detective Dan", were revived for the new season. In addition to Mitchell and Thompson, Lori Beth Denberg, Josh Server, Alisa Reyes, Mark Saul, Jamie Lynn Spears, and Lisa Foiles also returned.

== Cast ==
Starring

- Ryan Alessi
- Reece Caddell (Note: Vital Information anchor)
- Kate Godfrey
- Gabrielle Nevaeh Green
- Nathan Janak
- Lex Lumpkin
- Chinguun Sergelen

Notes

Featuring

- Aria Brooks (first episode: January 18, 2020)

== Production ==
In the fall of 2018, Brian Robbins, co-creator of the series, was formally announced as the new president of Nickelodeon. Now in charge of the company's programming unit, he expressed interest in a revival of the show. By November 2018, Robbins met with original cast member Kenan Thompson in New York where he performs in the cast of Saturday Night Live.

The show's second revival was announced as part of Nickelodeon's 2019 content slate on February 14, 2019.

On May 14, 2019, it was announced that the show would premiere on June 15, 2019. The new cast was officially revealed on Today with Hoda & Jenna on May 29, 2019.

On October 16, 2019, it was announced that Nickelodeon had ordered 13 additional episodes for the season, bringing the total to 26 episodes. It was also announced that Aria Brooks would be joining the cast for the new episodes.

On November 21, 2019, it was revealed that Jamie Lynn Spears and the cast of Zoey 101 would be reuniting in a Thelma Stump sketch, in an episode aired on July 11, 2020.

On February 19, 2020, it was announced that Nickelodeon had ordered an additional 10 episodes for the season. However, on March 16, 2020, Nickelodeon postponed all live-action productions due to the COVID-19 pandemic. Only eight of those episodes were completed, and production did not resume. However, on October 20, 2020, it was revealed that the twelfth season was originally filmed according to cast member Chinguun Sergelen during a interview, but was scrapped.

On March 19, 2024, cast member Gabrielle Nevaeh Green would confirm on her Instagram post that the show was indeed cancelled by ViacomCBS in 2021, around the time that she was set to begin work as a co-star on the Nickelodeon show, That Girl Lay Lay, although no specific reason was given for the cancellation.

== Episodes ==
No. overall	No. in season	Title	Musical guest(s)	Original release date	Prod. code	U.S. viewers (millions)
176	1	"Episode 1101"	The Jonas Brothers	June 15, 2019	1101	0.70
Green Room - The new cast is nervous for the first show and they get advice from Lori Beth Denberg (her first appearance on the show since the Live Show in 1999), Josh Server, and Kel Mitchell (their first appearance on the show since the Reunion Show in 2005). Kevin Kopelow cameos as Kevin the Stage Manager (his first appearance on the show since end of the original era in 2000).; Masked Video Game Dancer Celebrity Edition - In a parody of reality singing competition series The Masked Singer, Nick Cannon (Lex) hosts a show with celebrities disguised doing dances. Judges include Beyoncé (Gabrielle), Ariana Grande (Nathan), and Dwayne Johnson (Chinguun) and celebrity dancers include Adam Sandler (Ryan), Billy Ray Cyrus (Reece) and one mystery dancer.; Vital Information - Lori Beth Denberg decides that it is time for her to "return to her home planet" and must select a new host for Vital Information. An attempt to order one online goes wrong when she receives Instant Toast instead of an Instant Host, but Reece Caddell's comments about the situation make her realize that the perfect candidate is already present. After delivering one last piece of vital information for everyday life, Lori Beth warps away and Reece takes over the desk.; Marie Kiddo - Marie (Kate) helps Danielle (Gabrielle) decide what to get rid of. However, she causes massive destruction.; Good Burger - The Jonas Brothers go to Good Burger to get something to eat, and Ed (Kel Mitchell) gives them inspiration for a new single.; Cancelled with Nathan - Saying K instead of OK.; The Jonas Brothers perform "Sucker"
177	2	"Episode 1102"	Daddy Yankee	June 22, 2019	1102	0.67
Green Room - Missing Honey - The cast can't find the honey for the honey sketch.; Super Villains - The other supervillains (Kate, Gabrielle, and Chinguun) are not impressed with the main supervillain's (Lex) ability to make his super long coat longer.; Bed Bath & Beyoncé - First parody ad.; Loud Librarian - Mrs. Hushbaum (Lori Beth Denberg) returns with her hypocritical hijinks.; Trampolini's - An Olive Garden parody ad where the owner (Ryan) shows his restaurant where customers can enjoy homestyle Italian cooking while jumping on trampolines.; Babies Who Brunch - Nathan, Reece, and Chinguun portray millennial babies.; Vital Information; Bed, Bath & Beyoncé - Second parody ad.; Daddy Yankee performs "Con Calma"
178	3	"Episode 1103"	Kane Brown	June 29, 2019	1103	0.60
Green Room - The Button - The cast find a large button that says, "Do not push".; Simplicity - Two contestants Larry Van Halen and Linda Shnutzenberger (Chinguun and Reece) compete on a game show. The show's host Del Devine (Ryan) fails to explain any of the rules, and while Linda is able to answer the bizarre questions with ease, Larry can't make sense of anything and keeps getting penalized. He eventually loses, while Linda receives the prize of "a lifetime supply of anything she wants".; Positive Poppi - Poppi (Kate) tells the audience that life is a gift before being crushed by a giant present.; Positive Poppi #2 - Poppi (now with injuries) tells the audience to turn their can'ts into cans before she gets tumbled by a pyramid of cans and falls off a stair-like stool.; Dullmont Junior High - Coach Kreeton (Kel) returns to Dullmont Junior High to give a pep talk to the basketball team. Special appearance by Josh Server as the current coach.; The Silent Place #2 - Flatulence-themed movie trailer parody of A Quiet Place.; Literally Liza - A superheroine (Gabrielle) attempts to save the world from abuse of the word "Literally"; a cross-parody based on Amelia Bedelia and "Captain Literally" from Studio C.; Positive Poppi #3 - Poppi (now with more injuries) tells the audience that they miss 100% of the shots they don't take before she throws a basketball and ends up getting hit in the head with it.; Kane Brown performs "Lose It".
179	4	"Episode 1104"	Ally Brooke	July 13, 2019	1104	0.72
Coffee, Coffee, Coffee, Coffee, Coffee, Coffee - Customers have trouble dealing with Alicia (Gabrielle), a hyper barista, at a coffee shop.; Good Burger - Ed (Kel Mitchell) helps a new trainee named Benji (Ryan), learn how to deal with customers losing their phones.; Mattress Hat - Parody ad for a hat that can be used to sleep during school.; Shark Cave - Caveman entrepreneurs attempt to convince wealthy cave people (Reece, Gabrielle, and Lex) to invest in their new inventions.; Bed Bath and Beyoncé; The Pranklers - Two pranksters (Ryan and Lex) do mediocre pranks in the cafeteria that only they think are funny.; Cancelled with Nathan - Shoes with Wheels; Ally Brooke performs "Lips Don't Lie".
180	5	"Episode 1105"	Ella Mai	July 27, 2019	1105	0.83
Green Room - The All That cast and Henry Danger cast are supposed to meet, but each believes they're supposed to go to the other show's set.; Brie (Kate) gives beauty tips after going to the dentist.; Cancelled with Nathan - Noise-Cancelling Headphones: Nathan announces that he's cancelling this hardware, as wearing a pair ended up making him miss out on tickets to an Ariana Grande concert.; Boo'd Up - Ella Mai tries to find a ghost to haunt her house.; Crack Your Phone - Parody ad for people who want their phone to be cracked.; Vital Information; Ella Mai performs "Shot Clock"
181	6	"Episode 1106"	JoJo Siwa	August 3, 2019	1106	0.66
Green Room - Kenan Thompson (his first appearance on the show since the Reunion Show in 2005) comes to visit the cast but no one knows or recognizes him, not even Kevin, Josh, or Kel.; Marie Kiddo - Marie helps a high school principal (Lex) clear his office.; A music video explains how to make a sick day "sick".; Cancelled with Nathan - Text messages; A school dance leads to unexpected drama.; Bed Bath and Beyoncé; JoJo Siwa performs "BOP!"
182	7	"Episode 1107"	Ciara	September 21, 2019	1107	0.85
"Simplicity" returns, with host Del Divine (Ryan) still giving returning loser Larry (Chinguun) a hard time; "Story Time with Ariana Grande": the singer/actress (Nathan) puts a spin on "Three Little Pigs".; Beyoncé visits detention students.; Detective Dan (Josh Server) and his daughter Detective Ann (Kate) crash a birthday party after the magician (Ryan) makes Ann's dollar bill disappear as part of a trick.; Bed Bath & Beyoncé; "Jay-Z Penny": Rapper Jay-Z (Lex) has a new department store (a parody of J. C. Penney) where anything and everything is available. Customers can even buy Peyton Manning (who appears as himself) and receive all of his Super Bowl rings for free (although Manning protests that he did not agree to that deal).; "I Wear Everything": a music video featuring Nathan and Ryan rapping about wearing everything to school.; Ciara performs "Set"
183	8	"Episode 1108"	H.E.R.	September 28, 2019	1108	0.92
"Cancelled With Nathan": Nathan is fed up with how a friend told him about how her Summer vacation was.; A "Tickle Monster" is among the "Usual Suspects"; "Babies Who Gossip": the babies are gossiping in a playroom.; "Good Burger": Ed meets H.E.R. and it leads to confusion with the singer's name.; "We Have Everything": a shop that sells everything from Swedish meatballs to a golf bag filled with egg salad.; "Flipped the Script": Chinguun is unaware that they altered a sketch he was scheduled to do and goes along with it.; H.E.R performs "Hard Place"
184	9	"Episode 1111"	Bryce Vine	October 5, 2019	1111	0.64
"Good Burger": Ed is confused over giving a customer (Reece) a gluten-free burger.; "Brie's Beauty Basics": Brie (Kate), still not listening to her dentist (after having teeth pulled), offers yet another disastrous makeup livestream broadcast; "Park Ranger Peggy & Ranger Rob": A pair of camp rangers (Gabrielle and Lex) teach campers safety tips that doesn't go too well.; Gabrielle, Reece, and Kate in a juiced-up parody of Lizzo's "Juice"; A Dullmont Junior High School play is interrupted by "Cheerleader Darcy" (Kate).; Bryce Vine performs "La La Land"
185	10	"Episode 1110"	CNCO	October 12, 2019	1110	0.59
Marie Kiddo (Kate) destroys Chad's (Ryan) and Randy's (Lex) boys-only treehouse; Count Dracula (Ryan) talks about the iPhone with the Invisible Man (voiced by Nathan); Bed Bath and Beyoncé; Jay-Z Penny; "We Need a Dog" Music Video: A music video where two siblings (Lex and Gabrielle) explain to their parents (Glozell and Jenina Fredrique Aponte) about why they need a dog. Young Dylan cameos as their younger brother who wants a dragon.; Cancelled with Nathan: Trick or Treating; Girl Scouts are out to collect badges, with Alisa Reyes (her first appearance on the show since the Reunion Show in 2005) as their leader; "Vital Information" with Reece; CNCO performs "Pretend"
186	11	"Episode 1109"	The Jonas Brothers	November 2, 2019	1109	0.70
"Pranklers" returns to prank Dullmont Junior High students in a locker room; Green Room - The cast meet Darci Lynne Farmer, who hosts "All That's Got Talent," and the auditions from the cast aren't winning over Darci or her puppet Petunia.; "Cancelled With Nathan": Nathan has a pet peeve about reboots and revivals, only have it "uncancelled" when Lex reminded him that All That is among the television series that falls in that category. This leads to him cancelling the cancellation of reboots and revivals.; Chinguun meet Darci and Petunia backstage during the wraparounds, hoping to find out if Petunia is actually a talking rabbit.; A dog's owner (Lex) takes his pet to see an analyst (Ryan) to have his thoughts read to find out if he likes his owner.; "Storytime With Ariana": the singer/actress' (Nathan) interpretation on "Cinderella".; Chinguun still trying to find out if Darci's puppet Petunia was a real rabbit.; "Vital Information" with Reece.; The Jonas Brothers perform "Cool".
187	12	"Episode 1112"	Ty Dolla $ign	November 9, 2019	1112	0.64
Beyoncé's (Gabrielle) commercial session is interrupted by Coach Kreeton (Kel). Karl-Anthony Towns makes a cameo.; "Cancelled with Nathan": Bounce houses.; A genie who lives in a toilet (Chinguun) grants two people (Reece and Nathan) wishes that don't come true, since he's upset over living in a toilet.; "Star Wars" parody, with Reece as "Brey" and Ryan as "Brylo".; "Storytime with Ariana Grande": a new take on "Hansel & Gretel"; Detective Dan (Josh), Detective Ann (Kate), along with "Detective Stan" (their pet dog), try to solve a couple's "missing" dinner, which was being placed in a to go bag by the waitress (Reece) for the couple (Chinguun and Gabrielle).; Ty Dolla Sign performs "Purple Emoji"
188	13	"All That Music Special"	N/A	November 16, 2019	999	0.41
A parody on music award shows hosted by Beyoncé (Gabrielle) and Jay-Z (Lex), sponsored by "Mattress Hat" and "Trampolini's". Among the "best of" videos featured include "Sicko School Day Mode" by Scott Travis (Lex), "We Need a Dog" by the Siblingz (Lex and Gabrielle featuring Young Dylan), "Juice" by Miss Monica's Kindergarten Class (Gabrielle, Reece, and Kate), and "I Wear Everything" by Cooper & his Best Friend [Kyle] (Nathan and Ryan). Adam Sandler (Ryan) performs "Sticky Song".
189	14	"Episode 1113"	Tyga	November 30, 2019	1113	0.53
"Coffee, Coffee, Coffee, Coffee, Coffee, Coffee": Alisha makes coffees for Tyga and his entourage while frustrating the roadie (Nathan) who was sent to pick up the drinks.; Bed Bath & Beyoncé: two holiday promos; "Loud Librarian" (Lori Beth) returns for more mayhem, and brings along a barber shop act.; A science project contest featuring a student (Lex) who claims to have time traveled, leaving his fellow students (Kate and Chinguun) and his teacher (Josh) skeptical.; "Cancelled with Nathan": emojis featuring tongues and one eye closed; "So You Can Think You Can Dance While Performing Surgery": Cat Litter (Gabrielle) and her judges (Nathan, Lex, and Kate) have the final say on a contestant's (Reece) performance and surgery on a patient (Chinguun).; "Storytime With Ariana": Rapunzel gets a "Grande" treatment.; Tyga performs "Made Me"
190	15	"Episode 1114"	AJ Mitchell	January 18, 2020	1114	0.78
A hip-hop themed gift wrapping battle; Green Room - The cast uses a 3D printer to create new cast member Aria Brooks.; "Stay Off Your Phone": Contestants (Kate, Ryan, and Aria) are being challenged by the host (Gabrielle) to avoid using their device in order to win a prize.; First time Dullmont Cinema employee Tammy (Kate) is giving out too much information about her eclectic life and annoying her manager (Nathan) while he trains her.; Bed Bath & Beyoncé; A Barney-like Tyrannosaurus Rex (performed by Anthony LeBlanc) is bought to life by scientists, giving the owner of a Dinosaur Park (Lex) displeasure.; AJ Mitchell performs "Slow Dance"
191	16	"Episode 1116"	The Melisizwe Brothers	January 25, 2020	1116	0.63
Witney Carson visits "Good Burger" and dances with Ed (Kel) in a dream sequence in a parody of their stint on Dancing with the Stars.; "Life Hacks with Billie and Millie" (Lex and Gabrielle) gets a visit from Thomas Edison (J. P. Manoux); "Hit 'em with Spanish": As the title implies, a guest (Ryan) learns how to speak Spanish from its host (Noah Rico) and gets physically attacked at the same time.; A Taylor Swift fan, Trisha Smith (Kate), test out songs that has her friends (Gabrielle, Reece, Ryan, and Lex) freaking out because she is singing about them.; Green Room - Kate and Ryan rescue Reece from a claw machine.; "Cancelled with Nathan": A pet peeve about gum, which gets the attention of Ryan after Nathan sees him chewing one.; The Melisizwe Brothers (the winners of America's Most Musical Family) are challenged by the cast for musical talent; The Melisizwe Brothers performs "Stadium"
192	17	"Episode 1115"	PUBLIC	February 1, 2020	1115	0.59
The Loud Librarian--Happy Birthday!": It is Ms. Hushbaum's birthday, but the students have a hard time celebrating, as her demands for well wishes and songs are paired with her usual shrieks for quiet. Things only get worse when she receives her present: a new electric guitar, which helps her lead her incredibly loud band, "Hushbaum and the Hardcovers". (Ironically, this episode aired a day before Lori Beth Denberg's actual birthday, which is February 2).; Green Room - Lex and Gabrielle have a text-off (Wild West style); Star Trek spoof, in which a calculation officer named Smart (Nathan) is not all that smart, no pun intended.; Dance teacher Leslie Van Pruitt (Ryan) teaches bad dancing to a group of awful dance students.; "Predictions with Eureka, the slightly-off psychic" (Aria) tells a person that he will eat a sandwich, except it is the other way around.; "Babies Who Gossip": the babies take their eight-month photo shoot.; PUBLIC performs "Make You Mine"
193	18	"Episode 1117"	Asher Angel	February 8, 2020	1117	0.66
"Cake Clash": contestants compete for the best cakes, but one clumsy contestant named Kevin (Chinguun) makes up by substituting his damaged one with his shoe; Positive Poppi (Kate) reminded people to take a thousand steps, but falls into a manhole after she takes one.; T@$#!eigh (Ryan) meets another guy named Tevin (Kate) at a theater; A couple (Lex and Gabrielle) are about to propose at the "Extreme Weather Restaurant"; "Cancelled with Nathan": Heart shaped boxes of chocolates because Nathan can't find one with Caramel (which Aria successfully picked out), and candy hearts (too chalky). Because of the latter, Nathan spares the chocolates in the heart-shaped box and cancels the candy hearts.; Green Room: T@$#!eigh and Reece meet Asher Angel; Asher Angel performs "One Thought Away"
194	19	"Episode 1118"	Young Dylan	February 15, 2020	1118	0.53
Music Video: A parody of Billie Eilish's "Bad Guy" as performed by the Wicked Witch of the West (Aria), Rylo Ken (Ryan), Lord Voldemort (Chinguun), and Joker (Kate) during their card game.; "Bed, Bath & Beyoncé"; A commercial for the "Fart Fixer"; After 25 years, the "Island Girls" (Alisa and Lori Beth, reprising their roles as Kiki and Fran) celebrate their anniversary, but when a delivery guy named Walter (Nathan) and DJ Wyatt (Chinguun) arrived, the girls escaped with their jet skis, leaving the guys stranded, thus the beginning of "The Island Boys".; "Cancelled With Nathan": Escape rooms where somebody emitted flatulence in it.; Green Room: Lori Beth rekindles a romance with the Big Ear of Corn. Alisa even quoted "I knew it!"; Green Room: Ryan and Kate must choose between a pair of Dylans, Old (Lex) and Young Dylan. Young wins.; Young Dylan performs "1234"
195	20	"Episode 1119"	Bad Bunny	February 22, 2020	1119	0.65
"Simplicity" returns, and yet once again Del (Ryan) is making Larry (Chinguun) a loser (for the 27th time). While he did manage to win by grabbing the golden bear trap, he now must defend his title.; "Life Hacks with Billie & Millie"... & Millie... & Millie... & Millie... & Millie! (Lex and five "cloned" Gabrielles); Leslie Von Pruitt (Ryan) brings his dancers to Liza Koshy's music video; A commercial for "Food Catapult"; "Positive Poppi" (Kate) reminds everyone that one door closes, another opens (and it slams into her face); New student Lucy Banner (Reece) morphs into anything that makes her frustrating, prompting her teacher (Alisa) to try to calm her down.; Green Room: Nathan is informed by Reece that the pet bunny he is introducing isn't Bad Bunny; Bad Bunny performs "Vete"
196	21	"Episode 1121"	Lauren Alaina	February 29, 2020	1121	0.44
The staff (Ryan, Nathan, Reece, and Chinguun) of Vermin Village Pizza (a parody of Chuck E. Cheese) are getting grilled by its owner, Denzel (Lex), on how to set up a birthday party for his niece (Aria); Green Room: Chinguun tries to get a birthday piñata open with help from Reece's friend Justin Turner; "Hit 'em with Spanish": Host Alex teaches Spanish to Zack (Nathan); Lucy (Reece) feels frustrated while participating in Miss Sage's (Aria) yoga class; "Vital Information"; Bed Bath & Beyoncé; Lucy transforms into Lauren Alaina, who performs "Getting Good"
197	22	"Episode 1120"	Why Don't We	March 21, 2020	1120	0.61
Coach Kreeton (Kel) teaches wrestling class, but did not count on one of the students (Aria) to call out her uncles, The New Day, after belittling her.; Green room: Ryan has hiccups and Aria, Lex, and Chinguun are there to help.; "Stay Off Your Phone": a mother and daughter are among the contestants, with Ariana Grande (Nathan) making a guest appearance.; A mannequin named "Barbara" is invited to a girls' (Reece, Gabrielle, and Aria) sleepover.; "Bed, Bath, & Beyoncé"; Gabrielle and Aria introduce Why Don't We, who performs "What Am I"
198	23	"Episode 1122"	SuperM	April 4, 2020	1122	0.49
SimonSlayz (played by PrestonPlayz) is paired up with Tammy (Kate) during a video game championship.; Green room: Lex and Kate bumps heads and switched voices.; "Unboxing With Benny" (Chinguun) attempts to open a "Funtendo 64 Game System", and its making him "Freak"; The Loud Librarian (Lori Beth) is suffering from allergies, experiencing toothaches, and creating Frankenstein's monster.; A superhero named "Supreme Girl" (Gabrielle) takes a side job at a restaurant.; Reece, who is chosen All That's Star of the Week introduces her favorite group SuperM, who performs "Jopping"
199	24	"Episode 1123"	Queen Naija	April 11, 2020	1123	0.44
"Good Burger": Pete Wentz attempts to order 5,000 burgers from Ed; Green Room: Nathan hits the high notes, but Gabrielle counters with her voice, and both accidentally shatter Chinguun.; Marie Kiddo (Kate) destroys the lair of the evil Professor Doom (Ryan), and along with it his evil plans.; Trisha Smith (Kate) auditions for a talent show, which annoys the judges (Nathan, Gabrielle, and Chinguun) by singing about them.; "Life Hacks with Billy & Millie": Millie (Gabrielle) turns a battery into a jet pack, but Billy (Lex) fails with a pair of leaf blowers.; Aria and Gabrielle "properly" introduces Queen Naija, who performs "Good Morning Text"
200	25	"Episode 1124"	Echosmith	April 18, 2020	1124	0.59
"Klumsy Kevin" (Chinguun) returns, breaks a valuable vase and tries to come up with exaggerated explanations; Green Room: Nathan traps Reece, Chinguun, and Gabrielle in his "Escape Room of Doom".; "Park Ranger Peggy & Ranger Rob" meets the stars of Danger Force and give them tips with disastrous results.; "Island Boys": Walter (Nathan) and Wyatt (Chinguun) befriends a pig.; "Cuddly Wuddly Creatures": Allison (Reece) tries to get Brooke (Aria) to pet a rabbit that Brooke is afraid to touch during a livestream; Tammy (Kate) and Aria introduces Echosmith, who performs "Diamonds"
201	26	"Episode 1125"	blackbear	April 25, 2020	1125	0.53
"The DJ Salad Story" talks about DJ Salad (Chinguun) which features interviews with Ariana Grande (Nathan), Rihanna (Aria), Scooter Byrd (Ryan), Bad Bunny, Pete Davidson, and Travis Scott (Lex).; Green Room: Kate, Nathan, and Gabrielle enjoy watching a larger than life flat-screen TV.; "The DJ Salad Story, Part 2": a battle heats up between Salad and Cardi Beef (Gabrielle).; Detective Dan (Josh) and Detective Ann (Kate) help Ruth (Reece) find her cat, but when a person (Ryan) finds the feline, he is mistaken as the suspect and even the cat is arrested.; "Vital Information"; "The DJ Salad Story, Part 3": the rivalry is quashed, as Salad, Beef, and Toast Malone (Nathan) collaborates on a new single called "Steak Salad".; A bear (depicted as a man in a bear suit) helps Aria and Chinguun introduce blackbear, who performs "Me and Your Ghost".
202	27	"Episode 1126"	Lauv	May 16, 2020	1126	0.53
Coach Kreeton (Kel) returns to teach Dullmont Junior High students how to play ping-pong; "Green Room": Kevin saves Nathan, Reece, and Aria from a trapped TikTok challenge (save for Ryan, though); A commercial for the "Human Car Wash"; "An All That Music Video": Kate spoofs Justin Bieber's "Yummy", set in a school cafeteria; "Life Hacks with Billy & Millie": Millie creates a non-reversible shrink ray, and it shrunk Billy by accident; Tammy (Kate) is a witness to a vandalized statue, but TV reporter Ava Allswell (Gabrielle) is not getting nowhere and getting too much information from Tammy even when she admits that she has a short memory on who the culprit is.; Chinguun and Reece meet four different versions of Lauv, but only one goes out to perform "El Tejano" with special surprise guest Sofia Reyes; Closing scene has Kevin still dancing and the janitor from the "Yummy" spoof watching him while cleaning.
203	28	"Episode 1131"	Trevor Daniel	May 23, 2020	1131	0.42
T@$#!eigh (Ryan) and her friends (guest stars Annie LeBlanc and Jayden Bartels) welcome the new girl (Chinguun) to the clique; Tammy (Kate) and her mother, also named Tammy, are called in to the office of her principal (Mark Saul) over the younger Tammy's TMI behavior only to find that the older Tammy is similar to her daughter.; Lil Nas X (Lex) promotes a new album; Green Room: Annie and Jayden annoys Reece with a song about the cast; "Island Boys": Walter (Nathan) is annoyed and fed up with Wyatt (Chinguun) and his jokes; Nathan and Lex decides over who gets to introduce Trevor Daniel over chicken wings; Trevor Daniel performs "Falling"
204	29	"Episode 1130"	New Hope Club	July 11, 2020	1130	0.33
"Hit 'em with Spanish": Alex once again makes another clueless guest (Reece) a victim of a Spanish lesson; Green Room: Kate shows Gabrielle how to score in basketball; Penny (Aria) tries to design an avatar (Chinguun) for her video game; A horse and a "moosalope" is chosen as the finalists for the local school mascot.; For the first time since 2005, Jamie Lynn Spears returns to All That as both herself and Thelma Stump, and is reunited with the cast of Zoey 101.; Ryan practices Shakespeare with Gabrielle as they introduce New Hope Club, who performs "Let Me Down Slow".
205	30	"Episode 1127"	Darci Lynne Farmer	July 18, 2020	1127	0.36
"The Pranklers" (Ryan and Lex) try to wreak havoc at a farm fair.; Darci Lynne Farmer and Petunia play cops interrogating a student (Kate) accused of starting a food fight.; "Cancelled With Nathan": "LOLs"; "Unboxing With Benny": Benny (Chinguun) "freaks" over trying to get a console open.; "Mermaid Haul": a pair of mermaids (Gabrielle and Nathan) displays lost items from the ocean.; "Vital Information" with Reece; Nathan (as a puppet) and Gabrielle introduce Darci Lynne and Oscar, who performs "Something's Got a Hold on Me".
206	31	"Episode 1128"	HRVY	July 25, 2020	1128	0.32
"Stay Off Your Phone" returns with new contestants; Nathan, Noah, and an elderly woman named Lorraine (Aria); Green Room: Reece explains to Aria and Kate how her joke is funny.; Denzel (Lex) has a better idea for a surprise party.; Tammy (Kate) appears in a debate for school president, annoying her opponent (Lex) and the principal (Reece).; Bed Bath and Beyoncé; Nathan and Gabrielle introduces HRVY, who performs "Me Because of You"
207	32	"Episode 1129"	Monsta X	August 1, 2020	1129	0.41
"Life Hacks with Billy & Millie": Millie (Gabrielle) creates a curtain that can transport, but when Billy (Lex) tries it he's transported to Antarctica.; T@$#!eigh (Ryan) meets Toshua (also Ryan in a dual role) at a basketball game; A commercial for the "Lasagna Cooler" which a family (Nathan, Reece, and Lisa Foiles) gets a product to cool their hot lasagna, but the person (Mark Saul) featured in the ad is cooling the food with his breath instead of the actual product. When the real product is shown during a dinner party with other people, the man turns out to be Stuart who departs in the usual manner.; "Positive Poppi" (Kate) reminds everyone that there's a light at the end of the tunnel by going through a pipe, but as she sees a lamp at the end, she is electrocuted by it.; "Coffee, Coffee, Coffee, Coffee, Coffee, Coffee": Alisha (Gabrielle) serves up a "Frankie Grande" to an elderly woman (Aria).; Green Room: Aria takes up art and shows off her talents to Ryan and Lex; The Bros (Kate and Gabrielle) and Chiguun introduce Monsta X, who performs "Middle of the Night"
208	33	"Episode 1132"	Johnny Orlando	August 8, 2020	1132	0.26
"Cancelled with Nathan": Virtual Reality games because of his bad experience with one at Caden's house.; A commercial for a dating app for monsters only; Klumsy Kevin (Chiguun) partakes in the Dullmont Dog Show. When his dog Phoenix runs off, he is resorted to using a water bottle as a substitute.; "Positive Poppi" (Kate) uses a bicycle to remind everyone "Life is like riding a bicycle. To keep your balance you must keep moving." Unfortunately, the bicycle that was put in place comes loose and injures Poppi!; Green Room: Gabrielle learns that Kate has been stuck in a box for two weeks in order to hide from Reece; Kate had a robot lookalike take her place while having to cover up the fact that she is meeting with other robots later to discuss how to take over the world.; "Island Boys": Walter (Nathan) attempts to build a signal, and discovered Wyatt (Chinguun) had cookies after he breaks the device.; Eureka (Aria) makes a prediction that a woman will be a victim of a bank robbery, but is slightly off when a pig robs Eureka’s money from her safe.; "Vital Information" with Reece; Ryan, Lex, and Nathan assemble musical guest Johnny Orlando, who performs "Waste My Time".
209	34	"Episode 1133"	Ceraadi	August 15, 2020	1133	0.32
"Backstage": The cast show off their handshakes and moves.; In a spoof of the Stranger Things series, a young girl (Aria) is worried about staying at Camp Hawkins for all the strangest reasons which she brings up to her mom (Lisa Foiles).; "Babies Who Gossip": The babies help celebrate another's (Aria) one-year birthday party.; "Cancelled With Nathan": Nathan mentions his pet peeve about soup where a friend of his brought it for her lunch and was slurping it. To make things worse when he addresses her, she accidentally spills her soup on Nathan's BLT sandwich which his mother made him.; "Coffee, Coffee, Coffee, Coffee, Coffee, Coffee": Alisha (Gabrielle) meets T@$#!eigh (Ryan), who's trying to access WiFi, and is decaffeinated while attending to a customer's (Reece) mobile order.; "Positive Poppi" (Kate) reminds everyone that "If you think small, your world will be small. If you think big, your world will be big." Poppi is then flattened by a giant globe.; Kate asks Coach Kreeton (Kel) to help introduce Ceraadi, who performs "Dumbstruck".
210	35	"Episode 1134"	Pentatonix	December 17, 2020	1134	0.21
"Hit 'Em with Spanish": Alex (Noah) teaches Spanish to Greg (Chinguun).; A commercial for the "Galactic Force Extended Universe" action figures.; A holiday ad for "Bed Bath and Beyoncé".; Department store employees (Nathan, Chinguun, Reece, and Aria) get interrogated by Denzel (Lex) about spreading holiday joy.; "The Remote": A horror film trailer parody about a family (Nathan, Kate, Mark Saul, and Lisa Foiles) that loses their TV remote.; "Cancelled with Nathan": Candy canes, only to have them "uncancelled" when the announcer (Jermaine Fowler) suggests putting them in hot chocolate.; "Green Room": Ryan and Nathan talk about Christmas, but Nathan confuses it for other holidays.; Pentatonix performs "Rockin' Around the Christmas Tree".
