= All That season 5 =

All That
- Season 5
- Starring: Amanda Bynes; Leon Frierson; Christy Knowings; Kel Mitchell; Josh Server; Danny Tamberelli; Kenan Thompson
- No. of episodes: 24

Release
- Original network: Nickelodeon
- Original release: December 19, 1998 – January 8, 2000

Season chronology
- ← Previous; Season 4 Next → Season 6

All That's fifth season ran from December 19, 1998, to January 8, 2000. The season contained 24 episodes, alongside a backstage special, with a 100th episode at the tail-end of the season - however, "All That Live!" was created to celebrate the series' 100th show.

Lori Beth Denberg left the series at the end of the previous season. Danny Tamberelli succeeded her in the Vital Information sketch, and Tamberelli was given a new set and a new desk unlike that of Denberg's Vital Information.

Featured cast members Victor Cohn-Lopez and Zach Mclemore were both dropped from the show; producers then hired Nick Cannon and Mark Saul. This would be the final season for Kel Mitchell and Kenan Thompson.

== Cast ==
=== Repertory players ===
- Amanda Bynes
- Leon Frierson
- Christy Knowings
- Kel Mitchell (final episode: November 13, 1999)
- Josh Server
- Danny Tamberelli (Note: Vital Information anchor)
- Kenan Thompson

=== Featured players ===
- Nick Cannon
- Mark Saul (first episode: January 9, 1999)

== Episodes ==
- (HH) denotes the amount of households an episode was viewed in on premiere.

No. overall	No. in season	Title	Original release date	Prod. code	Viewers (millions)
78	1	"Blackstreet & Mýa"	December 19, 1998	580	N/A
Green Room -Mail Order Cast Member: Amanda has mail-ordered a new cast member; Nick Cannon.; Miss Piddlin: Miss Piddlin participates in the Dullmont Cook-Off; Vital Information with Danny Tamberelli; The Dullmont Stakeout: Principal Pimpell and Janitor Gaseous try to figure out who has been putting gum on the water fountain. A student (Mark) licks it; a sick girl sneezes on it; a jogger (Josh) washes off some armpit fungus; a girl (Amanda) washes her skunk, Seymour; two surgeons wash a heart to save its life; a girl (Christy) pours expired milk on it; and a guy (Nick) dumps monkey juice on it. Afterwards, they find the student (Leon) who is responsible for the gum.; Ask Ashley; Principal Pimpell Introduces Musical Guests: Blackstreet & Mýa ("Take Me There "); (First episode to feature Nick Cannon) (First episode to feature Danny Tamberelli as a Vital Information anchor)
79	2	"Tatyana Ali"	January 9, 1999	581	N/A
Green Room – Hole To China: Amanda and Leon dig a hole to China and Mark Saul appears out and asks if he can join the cast and he does by doing his first assignment by getting rid of Kevin to China.; Channel 6½ News: Forecast from the Arctic; Vital Information w/ Danny Tamberelli; Everyday French w/ Pierre Escargot; Stuart-Hall Monitor: Stuart (Mark) is the "new" hall monitor at Dullmont Junior High School and does crazy thing such as: making Megan Marples late, eating someone's (Josh) hall pass, beating himself up in front of bullies (Danny and Leon) and laying an egg and throwing it to Ms. Klump (Christy). Eventually, Principal Pimpell and Coach Kreeton find the real hall monitor (Nick) tied up and locked in a closet.; Don't Do This at Home; Channel 6½ Sports: The Prom; Pierre Escargot introduces Musical Guest: Tatyana Ali ("Daydreamin'"); (First episode to feature Mark Saul)
80	3	"Shaquille O'Neal"	January 16, 1999	582	N/A
Green Room-Who Stole Leon?: Leon is missing! Amanda, Christy, Kel, Josh and Nick try to solve the mystery of who stole him.; The Spice Boys: Former Spice Boys member Burt Spice (Kenan) returns as Spice Cube.; Vital information; What-Everrr: Gina and Jessica hold a contest for the Cutest Boy.; Overzealous Waiter; Spice Cube introduces Musical Guest: Shaquille O'Neal ("Heat It Up")
81	4	"Faith Evans"	January 23, 1999	583	N/A
Green Room – Black & White: Kenan, Kel and Danny walk into the Green Room to discover that everything is in black and white! They, along with Amanda and Leon, try to solve the problem. A helpful rocket scientist appears and figures out the issue-the "Color Switch" is off!; You Can't Win. Jerry Fytootal has three new challengers: Arnie Fishback (Mark), Lester Oaks, and Helga Schlumpkenfist (Danny). Lester Oaks quits the game after realizing Jerry isn't letting them win. Helga loses because she accidentally exceeds the number of meatballs she must eat; she eats 403 meatballs as opposed to the 400 she has to. She then proceeds to viciously assault Jerry, and declare herself the winner.; Vital Information; Ask Ashley; Dullmont Music Class: The funding for Dullmont's Music Class is cut short--on the same day that Principal Pimpell becomes mysteriously rich. He takes all of the kids' instruments, e.g. Max's (Leon) flügelhorn, but the music teacher (Danny) tells the students that they do not need real instruments to make music. Examples include Rupert playing Emma's (Christy) head, Betsy (Amanda) playing her tongue, Gingo (Nick) playing two chalkboard erasers, Queequeg (Josh) playing his bologna sandwich, Max playing a straw, and Seth (Mark) playing a pile of mud to perform the 1812 Overture!; Leroy & Fuzz-Brushing Your Teeth: Fuzz tries to tell Leroy that tooth brushing can be fun...until Leroy demonstrates a new toothbrush-a high-powered sander!; Pierre Introduces Musical Guest: Faith Evans ("Love Like This")
82	5	"Monica"	February 6, 1999	584	N/A
Green Room-Misfortune Cookies: Kenan, Mark, Amanda and Danny eat some fortune cookies. All of the fortunes describe extremely lucky things that will happen, except Danny's that involve Danny getting covered in fish, hit with a pie and penguin, and a tree falling on him.; The Spice Boys: Recording session; Vital information; Stuart: Yearbook Photographer-Stuart continues making the students complain on their yearbook photos. He shaved some of Bingo's (Nick) afro, took a picture of Amanda with an iguana, freaked Danny out when he fell in love with the camera, and also ate the camera. The students get Ms. Klump because Stuart ruined picture day, and they found the real yearbook photographer (Josh) who found out he made students complain on picture day. When Stuart leaves, the real yearbook photographer decides to reschedule picture day at Dullmont because he had to pay for the camera that Stuart ate.; What-Everrr: Gina and Jessica hold The Leo Party, a party themed after Leonardo DiCaprio. Activities include "Bobbing for Leo's" (in a pool decorated with Titanic merch) and a piñata shaped like Kate Winslet; favors include coupons from the place where Leo gets his bagels (or, filtered through Jessica's thick Valley girl accent, "bigalls") and pull-string dolls of Leo that can only say "I love you, Gina and Jessica!"; Hairy Spice and Sweaty Spice vs. Repairman introduce Musical Guest: Monica ("Angel of Mine")
83	6	"Mýa"	February 13, 1999	585	N/A
Green Room-Giant Carrot: A new giant vegetable challenges The Big Ear of Corn's supremacy. It turns out that the Giant Carrot is actually Kevin in disguise.; Miss Piddlin Camping: While camping Miss Piddlin makes kids (Amanda, Leon, and Danny) go crazy when she uses peas for everything! She even ends up having to put up with fending off a grizzly bear.; Vital Information; Channel 6½ News: Forecast from Death Valley; Best Friends Forever Show: A show where you win prizes if you let the host (Kenan) do something horrible to your best friend which involved either being tickled, having some of your teeth ripped out, having honey put on your face where a polar bear licks it, and even be shot into space.; Ask Ashley Introduces Musical Guest: Mýa ("Movin' On")
84	7	"98 Degrees"	February 20, 1999	586	2.37 (HH)
Green Room – Attack Turtle: Amanda has an attack turtle to protect the Green Room, but soon it attacks Kevin when he walks in!; Jimmy Bond Agent 1/7: Jimmy Bond is called in to deal with the indecisive villain Dr. Maybe (Mark).; Vital Information; Have a Nice Day with Leroy & Fuzz: Leroy talks about why sharing irritates him.; Seymour Reacts to Bad Tennis; Miss Klump's Career Day: Skye (Amanda), Lester Oaks; Construction Worker, a stay-at-home dad (Josh), a prisoner (Danny), and a locksmith tells the kids what they do for a living.; Don't Do This at Home; Leroy & Fuzz introduce Musical Guest: 98 Degrees ("Because of You")
85	8	"All That Live!"	March 6, 1999	588 906	3.12 (HH)
Mýa Introduction: Mýa welcomes the audience to the show, and Kevin loses his pants. Various stars are shown walking the red carpet, even the Big Ear of corn.; Where's Danny?: Danny is late for the live show.; Green Room: Everyone is nervous about the live show, including Kevin. But Danny is nowhere to be found!; Good Burger: Ed keeps punching a customer (Josh) in the face when he keeps ordering a Good Punch. Meanwhile, Ed messes up Melissa Joan Hart's order and drives another customer (Mark) crazy.; What-Everrrr meets Repairman: It's Jessica's (Christy) birthday today, so Gina (Amanda) plans her surprise party on What-Everrrr! Gina receives Robert Ri'chard from Cousin Skeeter as a present (who ends up getting away). Jessica then breaks her nail, causing Repairman (Kel) to fall into What-Everrrr. Repairman ends up breaking everything, including the camera, which rolls the clip of Reinhardt the Dancing Monkey Boy.; Mavis & Clavis introduce Musical Guest: Lauryn Hill – "Doo Wop (That Thing)"; Backstage Tour: Kenan and Josh give the audience and the viewers at home a backstage tour of the All That studio. They show the dressing rooms, the joke room, the prop room, and the All That Wall of Gifts. The dancing monkey boy clip is shown again.; Vital Information: Danny still hasn't made it to the show yet, so Kevin asks the audience if any of them has experience in reading Vitals. Fortunately, Lori Beth Denberg was in the audience, but she refuses to do Vitals. This is the last time Lori Beth Denberg does the Vital Information sketch. Features Larisa Oleynik.; Where's Danny?: Danny's whereabouts, continued.; Fax Ashley: Since it is a live show, Ashley has a fax machine so she can receive live letters from viewers, but it turns out that all the letters from these people either have no exact idea of a live show.; Inconvenience Store: Latanya (Nick) and Lanisha (Kenan) criticize a customer's (Mark) bad breath when buying breathmints, and start hitting on a cute guy (Kel), which brings them to a fight. (This skit was written by Kenan Thompson and Nick Cannon); Danny is supposed to introduce the musical guest, but instead Josh introduces.; Musical Guest: Busta Rhymes – "Put Your Hands Where My Eyes Can See"; Danny finally arrives at the end of the show, and goes on to find out he's missed out on the whole event.
86	9	"112"	March 13, 1999	587	N/A
Green Room-Simon Sez: Kenan, Mark, Amanda, and Danny play an extremely odd game of Simon Says. Simon has the cast break Danny's CD player, hit him with rocks, and makes him hold his breath. It's only when Simon asks for money do they question his identity and discover his name is Ralph. They inform Danny he doesn't have to hold his breath anymore but when he says "you have to say Simon Says" they decide to go do the show and leave him with his blue face.; Inconvenience Store; Vital information; Science Class Projects: Tilly (Amanda) is eager to show off her science project. Unfortunately, Miss Klump calls not on her, but on people who didn't do their science projects until Tilly jumps out the window.; Pierre Escargot; Ask Ashley; Seymour reacts to Musical Guest: 112; Musical Guest: 112 ("Love Me")
87	10	"Deborah Cox"	March 20, 1999	589	N/A
Green Room – Danny's Mom: Danny's mom, Kellylyn Tamberelli, embarrasses him in front of Amanda, Christy, Kel, and Mark. She starts by showing them some pictures of Danny.; However, when she is about to tell the kids about the ways they're hurting Kevin, she means they're hurting him in the wrong way...: Superdude vs. Dairy Godfather: The Dairy Godfather (Josh) has his henchmen (Mark and Leon) kidnap Penny Lane (Christy). Superdude tries to rescue her but, he gets drenched by milk and tied onto a milk machine. Penny unplugs the machine allowing Superdude to escape and defeat the Dairy Godfather and his henchmen, who were too scared to fight.; Vital information; Stuart: Stuart continues making customers complain at the post office. He destroyed Danny's fragile stuff from a package, read Josh's love letter, sent Leon's cat to Japan and destroyed Amanda's letter. He also tied up the real postman in the closet. After Stuart leaves, the real postman decides to send Leon's cat back to him.; First Aid Class: Miss Klump teaches First Aid by harming the students.; Lester Oaks introduces Musical Guest: Deborah Cox ("Nobody's Supposed To Be Here")
88	11	"Outkast"	March 27, 1999	590	4.23 2.61 (HH)
Green Room-Time Capsule; The Spice Boys; Vital Information with Danny Tamberelli; Have A Nice Day With Leroy & Fuzz: Leroy talks about why going to the doctor irritates him.; Los Angeles Mayor Richard Riordan interrupts a sketch to help All That celebrate its 1 millionth use of the word "Cheese". Shortly after that interruption another interruption occurs so that the show can celebrate its 1 millionth use of the word "Pants".; Channel 6½ News: Planet Mars; Latanya and Laneesha introduce Musical Guest Outkast ("Rosa Parks")
89	12	"Divine"	April 10, 1999	591	2.08 (HH)
Green Room – Green Guardian: A mystical ancient spirit that protects the Green Room arises to help the kids.; At Home with Detective Dan: Detective Dan's intelligent daughter (Amanda) tries to get her father to realize that burglars are robbing their house.; Vital information; The Date Game: A girl (Christy) must choose whether she should go out with Antoine, Lump Maroon, or Francis the Caveman (Danny).; Class Juice: A boy (Mark) brings a juicer to Show and Tell that can juice anything, including a chicken, a math book, a shoe, a folder and even Ms. Klump (with a hint of orange).; Skye Introduces Musical Guest: Divine – ("Lately")
90	13	"5 Young Men"	April 17, 1999	592	N/A
Green Room – The Alien: An alien comes down to Earth-and chooses to visit the All That set!; Inconvenience Store; Vital information; Channel 6½ Sports; Have a Nice Day with Leroy & Fuzz: Leroy talks about how haircuts irritates him.; Stuart is not the "real" Musical Guest: 5 Young Men ("One More Chance")
91	14	"Joey McIntyre"	May 8, 1999	594	1.94 (HH)
Green Room – Amanda's Lost Voice: Amanda loses her voice, so Kel, Mark, and Christy search for it. They eventually find it in a jar...but when Amanda drinks the jar's contents, she prepares to rush out and conquer the world. It was EVIL Amanda's voice!; Miss Piddlin: Some kids (Danny, Mark, and Leon) trip to the beach is ruined by the arrival of Miss Piddlin, who tries to force everyone to eat peas. She builds a "Pea Castle" as opposed to a sand castle, rubs peas all over everyone for sunscreen, and even saves a life of a swimmer (Nick) with a "Life Pea-server" and "C-Pea-R"!; Vital information; Seymour Reacts to Stuff: Why Did the Chicken Cross the Road; Coach Kreeton vs. Science Projects: Coach Kreeton is a substitute teacher on the day of the Science Fair. Every project-including a set of motion-transfer orbs and a volcano ends up hurting the Coach in surprising and painful ways. One student (Mark) zaps him with a high powered laser beam.; Pierre Escargot; Ask Ashley; Don't Do This at School; Francis the Caveman tells caveman jokes on the All That stage and introduces Musical Guest: Joey McIntyre; Musical Guest: Joey McIntyre ("Stay the Same")
92	15	"Backstreet Boys"	May 15, 1999	593	N/A
Green Room – Swordfish in the Stone: Merlin the Wizard appears in the Green Room, along with a huge swordfish in a large stone. Merlin promises that whoever pulls the swordfish out will be rewarded with a "ton of gold." Kenan, Kel, and Nick all try it, but fail. Danny appears and easily pulls the swordfish out of the stone...and a literal ton of gold falls from the ceiling and buries him!; Judge Stuart: Stuart becomes a judge, and starts annoying convicts and the bailiff (Kenan) until it is discovered that he had replaced the real judge (Christy).; Vital information; Barber Shop: A barber (Leon) leaves his son (Kel) in charge of his barber shop, features the return of Earboy.; Pierre Escargot; Detective Dan: A bank is attacked by a robber (Christy) ...but it's Detective Dan to the rescue! Unfortunately, he accuses everyone but the bank robber (who is dressed in a ski mask and carrying money) of committing the crime. Dan eventually decides that HE is the real robber and so he tells the officers (Leon and Amanda) accompanying him to throw him out of the window!; Don't Do This at School; Mavis & Clavis introduce Musical Guest: Backstreet Boys ("I Want It That Way")
93	16	"The Best of Kenan Thompson"	May 22, 1999	900	N/A
Featured skits with Kenan including: Ishboo, Randy who is chocolate chef, Superdude, Miss Piddlin, Baggin Saggin Barry, Bill Cosby, Principal William Baines Pimpell, Piere Escargot and others.
94	17	"The Best of Amanda Bynes"	May 22, 1999	901	N/A
A collection of skits featuring Amanda Bynes from Seasons 3-4. Among the sketches are her first appearance, Ask Ashley, What-everrr, and more.
95	18	"3rd Storee"	October 16, 1999	597	N/A
Green Room – He Said, She Said, Kevin Said: Some news is passed along the kids and Kevin. Soon, the message gets completely changed which ends with Abraham Lincoln falling on top of Kevin.; Substitute Sketch: An audience member claims he doesn't like the sketch, after various changes he still says he doesn't like it. Kenan and Amanda offer to let him be in the sketch and throw him out a window.; Vital Information; Pet Rock Star: A boy (Leon) wants to have a rock star (Josh) as a pet. But, his mom (Christy) wants him to have an accountant like his brother (Kenan).; Seymour Reacts to Stuff; Spice Boys: While in their hotel suite, the Spice Boys have to sign autographs despite the disruption of the fans outside. They end up performing one of their songs to the hotel manager (Mark).; Vital Introduction Introduces Musical Guest; Musical Guest: 3rd Storee ("If Ever")
96	19	"The Best of Kel Mitchell"	October 23, 1999	902	N/A
A showcase of sketches featuring Kel Mitchell including: Repairman; Coach Kreeton; Okrah; Mavis and Clavis; Ed the cashier at Good Burger; and others.
97	20	"New Radicals"	November 6, 1999	596	N/A
Green Room – Treasure Map: Mark finds an old treasure map, which promises that a great treasure is hidden somewhere in the Green Room. He, Kenan, Kel, and Danny follow the map's instructions...only to find a pair of pants hidden beneath a couch cushion. The map was actually a "trouser" map!; Art Class: A substitute art teacher (Josh) causes trouble at Dullmont. He won't stop moving around, changing clothes, and even transforming into totally different people! He fails the kids because they "failed to paint him." In retaliation, all of the students literally pour paint on him!; Vital information; Seymour Reacts to Stuff: Seymour watches a marching band march by...right off a cliff!; What-Everrr – Mister Whatever: The girls host the first ever "Mister Whatever" contest. The contestants are Francis the Caveman, Principal Pimpell, and Bernie Kibbitz. Principal Pimpell wins, but the girls decide that their cardboard cutout of Leonardo DiCaprio is the best choice. Outraged, Pimpell beats the cutout with Francis's club.; Don't Do This at School; Pierre Escargot; Coach Kreeton introduces Musical Guest: New Radicals ("You Get What You Give)
98	21	"THE MAFT"	November 13, 1999	595	N/A
Green Room – Luigi's Bakery: Luigi the Baker is a huge fan of the show, and sends over 5,000 cream pies to the kids in thanks. Kevin appears as the kids discuss what to do with all of the pies. He thinks they are going to throw them at him, but they laugh-they would never do that. Amanda then reveals that Luigi sent a cake to throw at Kevin!; Dullmont Workout: A fitness instructor (Mark) shows up to get Coach Kreeton, Principal Pimpell, Janitor Gaseous, and Tandy Spork in shape. As they try to exercise, the Coach keeps getting hurt, while Gaseous's body odor and Pimpell's lack of physical fitness cause problems.; Vital information; Channel 6½ Sports: The anchors of Channel 6½ Sports (Josh and Kenan) comment as a student (Leon) takes a test in Ms. Klump's (Christy) class. Trick plays are involved-but the test is passed when the student sends in Megan Marples (Amanda), the smartest kid in school, to replace him!; Pierre Escargot; Have a Nice Day with Leroy & Fuzz: Leroy hates doing chores, so Fuzz tries to inspire him to like them. In the end, Leroy finds one chore he enjoys...torturing Fuzz!; Christy and Nick hear messages from Kel's characters, Ed, Coach Kreeton, Lump Maroon & Repairman on the answering machine.; Musical Guest: The MAFT featuring Kel Mitchell ("We Gets Down"); (Last Episode To Feature Kel Mitchell, although he would still appear in the opening sequence)
99	22	"Shanice"	November 20, 1999	598	N/A
Green Room-Elephant Tug-o-War: Who will win in a battle of Tug-O-War: Amanda and Leon, or a herd of elephants?; Inconvenience Store Trainee: Latanya and Laneesha train a new employee Heather (Amanda); Vital Information; Seymour Reacts to Stuff; Channel 6½ News: Montana Hurricane; Pierre Escargot; Class Vampire: A vampire named Vlad (Mark) comes to Ms. Klump's class as a new student. He sucks kids' blood (Megan Marples (Amanda) and another little girl) and turns into a bat during class. Ms. Klump gives him garlic popcorn and a girl (Leon) opens a window and Vlad is destroyed.; Don't Do This at School; Vital Introduction Introduces Musical Guest; Musical Guest: Shanice ("When I Close My Eyes"); (Last Episode to Feature Kenan Thompson)
100	23	"The Best of Josh Server"	December 18, 1999	903	N/A
A collection of skits featuring Josh Server from Seasons 1-4. Among these skits are... Peter & Flem, Milkman, Earboy, Detective Dan, and much more.
101	24	"The Best of Lori Beth Denberg"	January 8, 2000	904	N/A
A collection of skits featuring Lori Beth Denberg from Seasons 1-4. Among the skits featured are... Loud Librarian, Ms Fingerly, Complaint Department, Vital Information, and much more.

=== Special (1999) ===
Title	Original release date	Viewers (millions)
"Music and More Backstage Pass"	July 10, 1999	N/A
A backstage look into All That's Music & More Festival, featuring interviews, performances, and highlights.
