= All That: Fresh out the Box =

Short collecters book published about the Nickelodeon show All That

- The book cover.
- Author: Steve Holland
- Language: English
- Genre: Variety
- Publisher: Aladdin
- Publication date: October 1, 1998
- Publication place: United States
- Media type: Paperback
- Pages: 112
- ISBN: 0-671-01958-9
- OCLC: 44132063

All That: Fresh out the Box is a 112-page All That collectors book that was released on October 1, 1998, and is distributed by Nickelodeon, Tollin/Robbins Productions, and Pocket Books. Released before the fifth season, the book only includes information on the first four seasons of the show.

== Cast featured ==
- Angelique Bates (Season 1 – Season 2)
- Amanda Bynes (Season 3 – Season 6)
- Lori Beth Denberg (Season 1 – Season 4)
- Leon Frierson (Season 4 — Season 6)
- Christy Knowings (Season 4 — Season 6)
- Kel Mitchell (Season 1 – Season 5)
- Alisa Reyes (Season 1 – Season 3)
- Josh Server (Season 1 – Season 6)
- Danny Tamberelli (Season 4 — Season 6)
- Kenan Thompson (Season 1 – Season 5)

== Other features ==
- The Characters – The cast members sketch characters; this also includes the info of each character
- The Episodes – Seasons 1-4, 77 episodes detailed total
- The Special Guest – Includes Musical and Special guest combined
- The Trivia Contest – A personality test of how smart someone knows All That well
- Behind the Scenes – This includes The Cast, The Crew, and Directors/Writers around the set
