= List of All That episodes =

The following is an episode list for All That, a sketch comedy, variety series that premiered on April 16, 1994 on Nickelodeon and was broadcast as part of their SNICK (1994–2004) and TEENick (2001–2005) program blocks. The series was created by Brian Robbins and Mike Tollin.

Nickelodeon's All That 10th Anniversary Reunion Special was a 10-year anniversary reunion that aired on April 23, 2005. It featured crossover sketches, numerous guest celebrities, the cast members from the past and present, and was hosted by Frankie Muniz.

During the course of the series, 210 episodes of All That aired over eleven seasons.

== Series overview ==
Season	Episodes	Originally released	
Season	Episodes	First released	Last released
1	15	April 16, 1994	April 29, 1995
2	21	October 7, 1995	October 26, 1996
3	20	November 16, 1996	November 8, 1997
4	21	November 15, 1997	December 5, 1998
5	24	December 19, 1998	January 8, 2000
6	19	January 15, 2000	February 24, 2001
7	13	January 19, 2002	May 4, 2002
8	14	September 21, 2002	July 26, 2003
9	16	October 11, 2003	February 21, 2004
10	13	April 23, 2005	October 22, 2005
11	35	June 15, 2019	December 17, 2020

== Episodes ==
=== Season 1 (1994–95) ===
No. overall	No. in season	Title	Original release date	Prod. code
1	1	"Phil Moore/TLC"	April 16, 1994	PILOT
2	2	"Da Brat"	January 21, 1995	101
3	3	"TLC"	January 28, 1995	102
4	4	"Immature"	February 4, 1995	103
5	5	"Craig Mack"	February 11, 1995	104
6	6	"Malcolm-Jamal Warner/Brandy"	February 18, 1995	105
7	7	"Aaliyah"	February 25, 1995	106
8	8	"Coolio"	March 4, 1995	107
9	9	"Soul 4 Real"	March 11, 1995	108
10	10	"Changing Faces"	March 18, 1995	109
11	11	"Blackstreet"	April 1, 1995	110
12	12	"Zhané"	April 8, 1995	111
13	13	"Usher"	April 15, 1995	112
14	14	"A Few Good Men"	April 22, 1995	113
15	15	"Aftermath featuring Kel Mitchell"	April 29, 1995	114

=== Season 2 (1995–96) ===
No. overall	No. in season	Title	Original release date	Prod. code	U.S. households (in millions)
16	1	"Naughty by Nature"	October 7, 1995	216	N/A
17	2	"Monica"	October 7, 1995	217	N/A
18	3	"Larisa Oleynik/Da Brat"	October 14, 1995	218	1.99
19	4	"Malcolm-Jamal Warner/Mokenstef"	October 21, 1995	219	N/A
20	5	"Jon B."	November 4, 1995	220	N/A
21	6	"The Twinz"	November 11, 1995	221	N/A
22	7	"Monteco"	November 18, 1995	222	N/A
23	8	"Soul 4 Real"	December 2, 1995	223	2.18
24	9	"Subway"	December 9, 1995	224	N/A
25	10	"Run DMC"	December 23, 1995	225	2.31
26	11	"Xscape"	January 6, 1996	226	N/A
27	12	"Diana King"	January 13, 1996	227	2.32
28	13	"Sinbad/Coolio"	January 20, 1996	228	N/A
29	14	"Mark Curry/Deborah Cox"	April 6, 1996	229	N/A
30	15	"Immature"	April 13, 1996	230	2.25
31	16	"Silk"	April 20, 1996	233	2.18
32	17	"Terry Ellis"	September 28, 1996	231	1.77
33	18	"Faith Evans"	October 5, 1996	232	N/A
34	19	"Shai"	October 12, 1996	234	2.00
35	20	"IV Xample"	October 19, 1996	235	N/A
36	21	"Monifah"	October 26, 1996	237	N/A

=== Special (1996) ===
Title	Original release date	Prod. code	Viewers (millions)
"Good Burger Special"	March 23, 1996	236	N/A

=== Season 3 (1996–97) ===
No. overall	No. in season	Title	Original release date	Prod. code	U.S. households (in millions)
37	1	"Tia & Tamera Mowry/LL Cool J"	November 16, 1996	338	2.27
38	2	"Montell Jordan"	November 23, 1996	339	N/A
39	3	"Oliver Muirhead/Immature ft Smooth and Kel Mitchell"	November 30, 1996	340	1.89
40	4	"Dru Hill"	December 7, 1996	341	2.22
41	5	"Tyra Banks/Blackstreet"	December 21, 1996	342	N/A
42	6	"A Tribe Called Quest"	December 28, 1996	343	N/A
43	7	"702"	January 11, 1997	344	2.09
44	8	"Tony! Toni! Toné!"	January 18, 1997	345	2.34
45	9	"Chris Farley/Mint Condition"	January 25, 1997	346	2.65
46	10	"112"	February 1, 1997	347	2.07
47	11	"Sherman Hemsley/Nas"	February 8, 1997	348	2.39
48	12	"John Leguizamo/Mona Lisa"	February 15, 1997	349	2.58
49	13	"Ray J"	February 22, 1997	350	2.13
50	14	"Dr. Joyce Brothers & Sherman Hemsley/Heavy D"	September 6, 1997	356	2.30
51	15	"Monica"	September 13, 1997	354	2.39
52	16	"Aaliyah"	September 20, 1997	351	2.48
53	17	"For Real"	September 27, 1997	353	2.75
54	18	"MC Lyte"	October 4, 1997	355	2.17
55	19	"Erykah Badu"	October 25, 1997	357	1.96
56	20	"Az Yet"	November 8, 1997	352	2.63

=== Special (1997) ===
Title	Original release date	Prod. code	U.S. households (in millions)
"Music Special"	December 21, 1997	358	N/A

=== Season 4 (1997–98) ===
No. overall	No. in season	Title	Original release date	Prod. code	U.S. households (in millions)
57	1	"Mase"	November 15, 1997	459	N/A
58	2	"Busta Rhymes"	November 22, 1997	460	2.74
59	3	"Tommy Davidson/Robyn"	December 6, 1997	461	2.45
60	4	"Alisa Reyes & Tricia Dickson/Wyclef Jean"	December 20, 1997	462	N/A
61	5	"Dru Hill"	December 27, 1997	463	N/A
62	6	"Mary J. Blige"	January 3, 1998	465	N/A
63	7	"Immature"	January 10, 1998	464	N/A
64	8	"Spice Girls"	January 17, 1998	466	N/A
65	9	"Missy Elliott"	January 24, 1998	467	N/A
66	10	"Usher"	January 31, 1998	468	2.57
67	11	"Kirk Franklin & God's Property"	February 7, 1998	469	N/A
68	12	"Backstreet Boys"	February 21, 1998	470	2.48
69	13	"Boyz II Men"	March 7, 1998	471	N/A
70	14	"Destiny's Child"	October 10, 1998	474	2.15
71	15	"LL Cool J"	October 17, 1998	475	N/A
72	16	"Jermaine Dupri/Da Brat"	October 24, 1998	477	N/A
73	17	"Salt-N-Pepa"	November 7, 1998	473	N/A
74	18	"K-Ci & JoJo"	November 14, 1998	476	N/A
75	19	"Kobe Bryant/Ice Cube"	November 21, 1998	472	N/A
76	20	"The Lox"	November 28, 1998	478	N/A
77	21	"Sugar Ray"	December 5, 1998	479	N/A

=== Season 5 (1998–2000) ===
- (HH) denotes the amount of households an episode was viewed in on premiere.

No. overall	No. in season	Title	Original release date	Prod. code	Viewers (millions)
78	1	"Blackstreet & Mýa"	December 19, 1998	580	N/A
79	2	"Tatyana Ali"	January 9, 1999	581	N/A
80	3	"Shaquille O'Neal"	January 16, 1999	582	N/A
81	4	"Faith Evans"	January 23, 1999	583	N/A
82	5	"Monica"	February 6, 1999	584	N/A
83	6	"Mýa"	February 13, 1999	585	N/A
84	7	"98 Degrees"	February 20, 1999	586	2.37 (HH)
85	8	"All That Live!"	March 6, 1999	588 906	3.12 (HH)
86	9	"112"	March 13, 1999	587	N/A
87	10	"Deborah Cox"	March 20, 1999	589	N/A
88	11	"Outkast"	March 27, 1999	590	4.23 2.61 (HH)
89	12	"Divine"	April 10, 1999	591	2.08 (HH)
90	13	"5 Young Men"	April 17, 1999	592	N/A
91	14	"Joey McIntyre"	May 8, 1999	594	1.94 (HH)
92	15	"Backstreet Boys"	May 15, 1999	593	N/A
93	16	"The Best of Kenan Thompson"	May 22, 1999	900	N/A
94	17	"The Best of Amanda Bynes"	May 22, 1999	901	N/A
95	18	"3rd Storee"	October 16, 1999	597	N/A
96	19	"The Best of Kel Mitchell"	October 23, 1999	902	N/A
97	20	"New Radicals"	November 6, 1999	596	N/A
98	21	"THE MAFT"	November 13, 1999	595	N/A
99	22	"Shanice"	November 20, 1999	598	N/A
100	23	"The Best of Josh Server"	December 18, 1999	903	N/A
101	24	"The Best of Lori Beth Denberg"	January 8, 2000	904	N/A

=== Special (1999) ===
Title	Original release date	Viewers (millions)
"Music and More Backstage Pass"	July 10, 1999	N/A

=== Season 6 (2000–01) ===
No. overall	No. in season	Title	Original release date	Prod. code
102	1	"B*Witched"	January 15, 2000	699
103	2	"The cast from Snow Day/Hoku"	January 29, 2000	600
104	3	"Mandy Moore"	February 5, 2000	601
105	4	"Blaque"	February 12, 2000	602
106	5	"LFO"	February 26, 2000	603
107	6	"M2M"	March 4, 2000	604
108	7	"Sammie"	March 18, 2000	605
109	8	"*NSYNC"	March 25, 2000	606
110	9	"Sheryl Swoopes & No Authority"	April 1, 2000	607
111	10	"Britney Spears"	May 20, 2000	608
112	11	"The Best of Music"	July 29, 2000	999
113	12	"Ideal"	October 14, 2000	609
114	13	"Tracie Spencer"	October 21, 2000	610
115	14	"IMx"	November 4, 2000	611
116	15	"The Best of Tunes into TV"	November 18, 2000	905
117	16	"Dates, Goats, and Romance"	February 10, 2001	908
118	17	"Peas, Cheese and a Bag of Chips"	February 17, 2001	907
119	18	"The Best of Danny Tamberelli"	February 24, 2001	909

=== Special (2000) ===
Title	Original release date
"Music and More Backstage Pass 2"	July 8, 2000

=== Season 7 (2002) ===
No. overall	No. in season	Title	Original release date	Prod. code
120	1	"Frankie Muniz/Aaron Carter"	January 19, 2002	712
121	2	"Melissa Joan Hart/Usher"	January 26, 2002	713
122	3	"P. Diddy"	February 2, 2002	714
123	4	"Britney Spears"	February 9, 2002	717
124	5	"Tony Hawk/Barenaked Ladies"	February 23, 2002	715
125	6	"David Arquette/Mandy Moore"	March 2, 2002	719
126	7	"Kenan Thompson/LFO"	March 9, 2002	722
127	8	"Barry Watson/Christina Millian"	March 16, 2002	723
128	9	"Ray Romano/Lisa Leslie/Willa Ford"	March 23, 2002	721
129	10	"Amanda Bynes/City High"	April 6, 2002	724
130	11	"Aaron Carter/Samantha Mumba"	April 13, 2002	718
131	12	"Will Friedle/Nelly Furtado"	April 27, 2002	716
132	13	"Christina Vidal/Tyrese"	May 4, 2002	720

=== Season 8 (2002–03) ===
No. overall	No. in season	Title	Original release date	Prod. code
133	1	"B2K"	September 21, 2002	825
134	2	"Buddy Hackett/Phyllis Diller/Daryl Sabara & Alexa Vega / Play featuring Chris Trousdale"	September 28, 2002	826
135	3	"Yasmeen"	October 5, 2002	827
136	4	"Jeffrey Licon / Jennifer Love Hewitt"	October 12, 2002	828
137	5	"Steve Bridges / Tom Green / Avril Lavigne"	October 26, 2002	830
138	6	"3LW"	November 2, 2002	829
139	7	"Nick Carter/BBMak"	November 9, 2002	831
140	8	"Harry Bladder Special"	November 16, 2002	910
141	9	"Justin Timberlake / Aaron Carter"	November 23, 2002	832
142	10	"Britney Spears / Justincase"	January 18, 2003	833
143	11	"Nick Cannon & Orlando Jones / Monica"	January 25, 2003	835
144	12	"Steve Bridges as George W. Bush/Avril Lavigne"	February 1, 2003	834
145	13	"Matthew Lillard/O-Town"	February 15, 2003	836
146	14	"Tom Green/No Secrets"	February 22, 2003	837

=== Season 9 (2003–04) ===
No. overall	No. in season	Title	Original release date	Prod. code	Viewers (millions)
147	1	"Lillix"	October 11, 2003	938	N/A
148	2	"Nodesha"	October 18, 2003	939	N/A
149	3	"Drake Bell/Nikki Cleary"	October 25, 2003	940	N/A
150	4	"Third Eye Blind"	November 1, 2003	941	2.05 (Note: This figure represents the amount of viewers the episodes got with kids aged 2-11. This episode also received 1.14 million viewers with kids aged 9-14.)
151	5	"Da Razkalz Cru"	November 15, 2003	942	N/A
152	6	"Fefe Dobson"	November 22, 2003	943	N/A
153	7	"JC Chasez/Drake Bell"	January 10, 2004	945	N/A
154	8	"OK Go"	January 17, 2004	944	N/A
155	9	"Britney Spears/Nick Cannon"	January 24, 2004	946	N/A
156	10	"Brittany Snow/Wakefield"	January 31, 2004	947	0.91 (Note: With kids aged 9-14.)
157	11	"Boomkat"	February 7, 2004	948	N/A
158	12	"Drake Bell/Nick Lachey"	February 14, 2004	949	N/A
159	13	"Drake Bell"	February 21, 2004	950	N/A
160	14	"Avril Lavigne"	Unknown	913	N/A
161	15	"Substitute Jack"	Unknown	914	N/A
162	16	"Aaron Carter"	Unknown	915	N/A

=== Season 10 (2005) ===
No. overall	No. in season	Title	Original release date	Prod. code	K9−14 viewers (in millions)
163	1	"Mario"	April 30, 2005	1001	1.22
164	2	"Fantasia Barrino"	May 7, 2005	1002	N/A
165	3	"Jesse McCartney"	May 14, 2005	1003	N/A
166	4	"JoJo"	June 4, 2005	1004	1.08
167	5	"Tyler Hilton"	June 11, 2005	1005	0.93
168	6	"Bow Wow"	June 12, 2005 (Australia)	1007	N/A
169	7	"Drake Bell"	June 18, 2005	1006	N/A
170	8	"Morgan Smith"	October 1, 2005	1009	N/A
171	9	"Brooke Valentine"	October 8, 2005	1010	N/A
172	10	"American Hi-Fi"	October 15, 2005	1011	0.98
173	11	"Brie Larson"	October 16, 2005 (Australia)	1012	N/A
174	12	"Lalaine"	October 22, 2005	1013	N/A
175	13	"Avril Lavigne"	October 29, 2005 (Australia)	1008	N/A

=== Special ===
Title	Original release date	Prod. code	U.S. viewers (millions)
"Nickelodeon's All That 10th Year Anniversary Reunion Special"	April 23, 2005	998	3.3

=== Season 11 (2019–20) ===
No. overall	No. in season	Title	Musical guest(s)	Original release date	Prod. code	U.S. viewers (millions)
176	1	"Episode 1101"	The Jonas Brothers	June 15, 2019	1101	0.70
177	2	"Episode 1102"	Daddy Yankee	June 22, 2019	1102	0.67
178	3	"Episode 1103"	Kane Brown	June 29, 2019	1103	0.60
179	4	"Episode 1104"	Ally Brooke	July 13, 2019	1104	0.72
180	5	"Episode 1105"	Ella Mai	July 27, 2019	1105	0.83
181	6	"Episode 1106"	JoJo Siwa	August 3, 2019	1106	0.66
182	7	"Episode 1107"	Ciara	September 21, 2019	1107	0.85
183	8	"Episode 1108"	H.E.R.	September 28, 2019	1108	0.92
184	9	"Episode 1111"	Bryce Vine	October 5, 2019	1111	0.64
185	10	"Episode 1110"	CNCO	October 12, 2019	1110	0.59
186	11	"Episode 1109"	The Jonas Brothers	November 2, 2019	1109	0.70
187	12	"Episode 1112"	Ty Dolla $ign	November 9, 2019	1112	0.64
188	13	"All That Music Special"	N/A	November 16, 2019	999	0.41
189	14	"Episode 1113"	Tyga	November 30, 2019	1113	0.53
190	15	"Episode 1114"	AJ Mitchell	January 18, 2020	1114	0.78
191	16	"Episode 1116"	The Melisizwe Brothers	January 25, 2020	1116	0.63
192	17	"Episode 1115"	PUBLIC	February 1, 2020	1115	0.59
193	18	"Episode 1117"	Asher Angel	February 8, 2020	1117	0.66
194	19	"Episode 1118"	Young Dylan	February 15, 2020	1118	0.53
195	20	"Episode 1119"	Bad Bunny	February 22, 2020	1119	0.65
196	21	"Episode 1121"	Lauren Alaina	February 29, 2020	1121	0.44
197	22	"Episode 1120"	Why Don't We	March 21, 2020	1120	0.61
198	23	"Episode 1122"	SuperM	April 4, 2020	1122	0.49
199	24	"Episode 1123"	Queen Naija	April 11, 2020	1123	0.44
200	25	"Episode 1124"	Echosmith	April 18, 2020	1124	0.59
201	26	"Episode 1125"	blackbear	April 25, 2020	1125	0.53
202	27	"Episode 1126"	Lauv	May 16, 2020	1126	0.53
203	28	"Episode 1131"	Trevor Daniel	May 23, 2020	1131	0.42
204	29	"Episode 1130"	New Hope Club	July 11, 2020	1130	0.33
205	30	"Episode 1127"	Darci Lynne Farmer	July 18, 2020	1127	0.36
206	31	"Episode 1128"	HRVY	July 25, 2020	1128	0.32
207	32	"Episode 1129"	Monsta X	August 1, 2020	1129	0.41
208	33	"Episode 1132"	Johnny Orlando	August 8, 2020	1132	0.26
209	34	"Episode 1133"	Ceraadi	August 15, 2020	1133	0.32
210	35	"Episode 1134"	Pentatonix	December 17, 2020	1134	0.21
