= All That season 6 =

All That
- Season 6
- Starring: Amanda Bynes; Nick Cannon; Leon Frierson; Gabriel Iglesias; Christy Knowings; Mark Saul; Josh Server; Danny Tamberelli
- No. of episodes: 18

Release
- Original network: Nickelodeon
- Original release: January 15, 2000 – February 24, 2001

Season chronology
- ← Previous; Season 5 Next → Season 7

The sixth season of All That ran from January 15, 2000 to February 24, 2001. This season contained 18 episodes, as well as a backstage special episode.

Many changes occurred before the start of this season. Kel Mitchell and Kenan Thompson both left the show toward the end of the fifth season. Mitchell and Thompson would both go on to film the final season of Kenan & Kel and then leave Nickelodeon altogether. Producers hired then unknown comic Gabriel Iglesias to replace them.

Producers also upgraded Nick Cannon and Mark Saul to repertory status. They were the first cast members in the show's history to survive featured status, unlike that of Tricia Dickson, Victor Cohn-Lopez and Zach McLemore in past seasons.

After 13 episodes, the show was put on hiatus. To keep the show running, the producers compiled a series called Best of All That, featuring the season four cast members: Amanda Bynes, Lori Beth Denberg, Kel Mitchell, Josh Server, Danny Tamberelli, and Kenan Thompson. After those six episodes were four episodes called "Tunes into TV" (that had skits saluting comedy series), "Peas, Cheese, Bag of Chips" (that had skits featuring food), "Music" (featuring musical guests from past episodes), and "Dates, Goats, and Romance" (which shows clips from skits that had goats, dates, love or even all three elements). Leon Frierson and Christy Knowings did not have Best Of specials.

Eventually, Nickelodeon canceled All That, due to crew disputes and a general desire to move on. However, All That still had a strong following and was one of the most popular shows on the network. Nickelodeon planned to relaunch the show, starting from scratch.

Season 6 is the only season to feature Gabriel Iglesias and the final season for Amanda Bynes, Nick Cannon, Leon Frierson, Christy Knowings, Mark Saul, Josh Server, Danny Tamberelli and The Big Ear of Corn. After the season ended, Amanda Bynes went on to have a successful film and television career. Nick Cannon got his own show on Nickelodeon called The Nick Cannon Show. After the show ended, he went on to have a successful film and TV career and continued to have strong ties with Nickelodeon. He was proclaimed "Chairman" of TeenNick, on September 28, 2009. Cannon later got another show, Nick Cannon Presents: Wild 'n Out, which premiered in 2005 on fellow ViacomCBS network MTV. Gabriel Iglesias went on to become a very successful stand-up comedian. Christy Knowings left show business on her own terms. Leon Frierson left show business to have a normal life. Danny Tamberelli and Mark Saul left show business to focus on school. Josh Server also left on his own terms but kept strong ties with Nickelodeon and has made guest appearances on current Nickelodeon shows.

== Cast ==
Repertory players

- Amanda Bynes
- Nick Cannon
- Leon Frierson
- Gabriel Iglesias
- Christy Knowings
- Mark Saul
- Josh Server
- Danny Tamberelli (Note: Vital Information anchor)

== Episodes ==
No. overall	No. in season	Title	Original release date	Prod. code
102	1	"B*Witched"	January 15, 2000	699
Green Room-The Prize in the Box: Amanda buys a sweet new cereal called "All That in a Box" with a unique prize-a cast member is in every box! Sure enough, newbie Gabriel comes out of the box, covered in cereal.; Cheeseburger Doyle, Private Eye; Vital Information; Turbulent Airlines Flight; Ask Ashley; Pizza Guy; Baby Chat: Two babies (Christy and Gabriel) try to talk frankly about things they have no knowledge of.; Vital Introduction; Musical Guest: B*Witched ("Jesse Hold On"); (First Episode to Feature Gabriel Iglesias)
103	2	"The cast from Snow Day/Hoku"	January 29, 2000	600
Green Room-Snowman Kevin: It's a snowy day, and Amanda, Nick, Gabriel and Josh decide to build a snowman. But where did Kevin go--and why is that snowman saying "Five minutes?"; Cockroaches in your Pants: Jerry Futile hosts a new show where he stuffs cockroaches down peoples' pants.; Vital Information; Francis the Caveman - Snow Day; Have a Nice Day with Leroy & Fuzz: Leroy talks about why laundry irritates him; Boring Man vs. Hypnopants: Superhero Boring Man (Danny), whose superpower is boring people with long stories, meets Hypnopants (Mark), who hypnotizes people with his pants. Boring Man's stories end up tiring Hypnopants so much that he wins.; Cast Of Snow Day and Nick Introduce Musical Guest; Musical Guest: Hoku ("Another Dumb Blonde")
104	3	"Mandy Moore"	February 5, 2000	601
Green Room- Bowling: Amanda and Mark are bowling. But, when Danny loses the ball, they decide to play with his head.; Stuart- The store's new yet incompetent cashier, Stuart, acts like an octopus in front of Nick and tells him to pay $527, and then "corrects" it to $900 billion trillion quadrillion gazillion [including the tip] for the bananas, he sprayed his mouth with shaving cream and sprays it on Leon's face, took a bite of Amanda's tortillas, and tied up the real check-out guy [Danny]); Vital Information; Whateverr!!: The girls are introduced to Ricky Martin's less-famous, less-attractive brother, Benji Martin (Gabriel).; Baby Chat: The babies talk about politics, something they clearly know nothing about.; Everything for Free Store: Everything in the store, including a TV, a diamond necklace, bars of gold, and a watch, costs nothing (except scanning).; Stinke-E-Cheeses: A couple (Josh and Gabriel) take their kids (Amanda and Mark) to a restaurant where everything stinks.; Baby Chat Introduces Musical Guest; Musical Guest: Mandy Moore ("Candy")
105	4	"Blaque"	February 12, 2000	602
Green Room- Detective Dan: Detective Dan comes in. The cast explains Josh is playing around, until Josh appears himself.; Jimmy Bond vs Mr. Nice Guy; Vital Information; Turblent Airlines Flight; Latanya At Dudco - Latanya tries to get with a guy (Josh), who just so happens to already be her boss (Christy)'s boyfriend.; Jiffy Springs Introduces Musical Guest; Musical Guest: Blaque ("Bring It All To Me")
106	5	"LFO"	February 26, 2000	603
Green Room-The Musical: The entire cast sings a song before the show starts.; Channel 6½ News: Brenda sends Ray to a zoo where he is inside the cage of a gorilla.; Vital Information; Cheeseburger Doyle, Private Eye: A woman (Christy) asks Cheeseburger Doyle (Danny) to find out why her husband (Mark) keeps coming home late.; Baby Chat; Toby Braun: Toby (Josh) shows his new product, the Trophy-Maker 2000.; Dr. Debbie (Amanda) introduces the musical guest.; Musical Guest: LFO ("Girl on TV")
107	6	"M2M"	March 4, 2000	604
Green Room-Half-Rat: Leon is acting extremely odd-he sniffs out garbage and is obsessed with cheese. The kids soon discover that he has become a half-rat, half-boy!; Jiffy Springs (Amanda), Benji Martin and The Spice Boys perform together.; Vital Information; Pizza Guy in Ms. Klump's Class; Babychat; Danny and Josh in a "slow-food" restaurant sketch, with several interruptions.; Channel 6½ Breaking News: Brenda's coffee spilled!; Latanya introduces Musical Guest; Musical Guest: M2M ("Mirror Mirror")
108	7	"Sammie"	March 18, 2000	605
Green Room-Portal: Leon, Gabriel, and Mark are stuck in the Green Room, until they find a mysterious portal to another dimension open!; Latanya at Dudco. Latanya tries to show Ricardo (Mark) that she is the boss of Dudco.; Vital Information; An Important Message From Sweaty Spice (Nick); Francis the Caveman Show: Francis interviews Bill Clinton (Gabriel) and Jiffy Springs.; Channel 6½ News: Breaking News. The state map is now different that what it used to be, with Colorado and Texas switched, and more.; Ask Ashley/Stuart: Stuart takes over Ask Ashley (tied up the real Ashley under a cameralady).; Bernnie Kibbitz (Josh) introduces Musical Guest; Musical Guest: Sammie ("I Like It")
109	8	"*NSYNC"	March 25, 2000	606
Green Room-Exercise Bike: After Danny uses the new exercise bike, Amanda reveals that Danny set the machine to "Magnetize", causing him to become magnetic. He attracts, a wrench, spoons, a tuba, metal armor, and even the wreck balling for the building next door!; Detective Dan: Detective Dan crashes a wedding; Vital Information; Baby Chat; Channel 6½ News: World's Tallest Building; Al and Nigel, Animal Wranglers; Whateverrr!: The girls demonstrate a workout program that's mostly only helpful to them.; Amanda turns a grapefruit into *NSYNC; Musical Guest: *NSYNC ("Bye, Bye, Bye")
110	9	"Sheryl Swoopes & No Authority"	April 1, 2000	607
Green Room-Hide and Seek: It's an extreme game of hide-and-seek, with Leon hiding in the water cooler, Christy hiding on the TV, and Danny in Amanda's mouth!; Cheesburger Doyle, Private Eye; Vital Information; Bill Clinton - Three Shortage: President Bill Clinton (Gabriel) announces that America is facing a shortage of the number three. To replace it, he develops a new word--"chippermonkey."; Al and Nigel, Animal Wranglers; Channel 6½ News Break: Dr. Debbie, the cheerleading doctor, examines Bernie Kibbitz, Billy Fuco, and a mailman (Nick) who got hit by a rock (featuring Sheryl Swoopes).; Hypno-Pants (Mark) tells people that "you WILL give a round o' sound for No Authority".; Musical Guest: No Authority ("What I Wanna Do")
111	10	"Britney Spears"	May 20, 2000	608
Green Room-Leon for President: It's a presidential election, and the kids nominate...Leon!; Agent Jimmy Bond vs. Mr. Big; Vital Information; Superhero Auditions; Channel 6½ Breaking News: Brenda breaks flower pot; Toby Braun; Murray's supposed to introduce the musical guest, but after he pops his balloon, Leon introduces the musical guest; Musical Guest: Britney Spears ("Oops!, I Did It Again")
112	11	"The Best of Music"	July 29, 2000	999
Musical guests from seasons one through six.
113	12	"Ideal"	October 14, 2000	609
Green Room-Leon Deflates: After, Gabriel pops him by accident, Leon deflates, and is blown up by a helium pump.; Turblent Airlines; Vital Information; An Important Message From Jiffy Springs: Jiffy tells us about late limousines and how they can be a frequent source of frustration from pop stars like her. In the end, the limo that's supposed to pick her up from filming this PSA just so happens to be late.; Happy Homestuff with Gloria Bankhead: Gloria (Christy) shows us how to make interesting crafts, such as a computer and a dog ("His name's Gloria Bankhead Jr.!").; Baby Chat; Alien in the Classroom: An alien masquerading as a fireman comes to Miss Klump's class.; Channel 6½ Breaking News: Jimmy Bond & Agent Z introduce the musical guest.; Musical Guest: Ideal - "All About You"
114	13	"Tracie Spencer"	October 21, 2000	610
Green Room-Bionic Danny: Danny is rebuilt with some cool robotic features-they prove to be very cool. After testing out his arms he decides to test out his legs, and flies through the roof and into an airplane!; Cheesburger Doyle, Private Eye: A woman (Christy) asks Cheeseburger Doyle to find out if her husband (Josh) showers after playing baseball.; Vital Information; Channel 6½ News Breaking News: Vegetable Hunting: A hunter (Josh) shows someone (Nick) how to hunt vegetables.; Baby Chat; Boring Man: Boring Man deals with the return of Hypnopants; Channel 6½ News Intro to the Musical Guest; Musical Guest: Tracie Spencer ("Still In My Heart")
115	14	"IMx"	November 4, 2000	611
Green Room-Danny's Bad Hair Day: Danny has a hair day so bad that he repulses everyone who comes near! Eventually, Christy decides to let Danny borrow her hair.; Channel 6½ News: Dumpster; Vital Information: Danny is hit with stuff while trying to get some info out.; Happy Homestuff With Gloria Bankhead: Gloria has Bill Clinton (Gabriel) as a guest on the show.; An Important Message From Mumbly Spice: Mumbly Spice films a PSA to talk frankly about... something.; Stuart: Substitute Teacher (having tied up the real teacher [Gabriel] in the phone booth, Stuart splats an egg on Nick, scratches the board in front of everyone, throws Danny out of the window twice, and tapes Billy Fuco to the wall).; Ask Ashley; Turblent Airline Intro To Musical Guest; Musical Guest: IMx ("In & Out of Love"); (Final Episode of the show's 1st run) (Also the final episode to feature Josh Server, Amanda Bynes, Danny Tamberelli, Leon Frierson, Christy Knowings, Nick Cannon, Mark Saul, and Gabriel Iglesias)
116	15	"The Best of Tunes into TV"	November 18, 2000	905
A collection of skits saluting classic comedy series. Among the skits included are...Urkel's Holiday Hits, I Luv Lucy, and much more.
117	16	"Dates, Goats, and Romance"	February 10, 2001	908
Clips that feature mainly dates. Oh yeah, and a goat.
118	17	"Peas, Cheese and a Bag of Chips"	February 17, 2001	907
A collection of skits centered around food. Among the skits featured are Cheese Police, Miss Piddlin's "Give Peas a Chance", and more.
119	18	"The Best of Danny Tamberelli"	February 24, 2001	909
A collection of skits featuring Danny Tamberelli from Seasons 4-6. Among the skits featured are Vital Information, Jack Campbell--Fat Cop, and much more.

=== Special (2000) ===
Title	Original release date
"Music and More Backstage Pass 2"	July 8, 2000
A backstage look into All That's Music & More Festival, featuring interviews, performances, and highlights.
