= Ceraadi =

American dark techno duo from 2010 to 2021

- Origin: Cedar Rapids, Iowa, U.S.
- Genres: R&B; Soul; hip hop; pop
- Years active: 2010–2021
- Label: Roc Nation
- Past members: Emaza Gibson; Saiyr Gibson; Znuie Gibson
- Website: ceraadi.com

Ceraadi were an American R&B-hip hop duo based in Los Angeles. Their debut EP, Ceraadi's Playlist, was released in 2019.

== History ==
The group consisted of sisters Emaza Gibson, Saiyr Gibson, and Znuie Gibson, who are originally from Cedar Rapids, Iowa. They are of Filipino, Irish, and African American descent.

They were signed to Jay-Z's Roc Nation label in 2019. Their five-track EP Ceraadi's Playlist was released on August 9, 2019. The lead single off of the EP "Loyal" was released on May 16, 2019. In September 2019, they released the music video for the EPs second single, "Dumbstruck."

On social media, the sisters vlog about fashion, beauty, music and relationship advice, gaining a following of over 1.9 million Instagram followers and 1.3 million YouTube subscribers as of March 2020. Their music and fashion style has been described as having elements of early 1990s R&B and hip-hop, with influences including TLC, Janet Jackson, and Salt-N-Pepa.

== Members ==
=== Former ===
- Emaza Gibson
- Saiyr Gibson
- Znuie Gibson

== Discography ==
=== EPs ===
Title	Release details
Ceraadi's Playlist	Released: August 9, 2019; Label: Roc Nation; Formats: Digital download, streaming

=== Singles ===
- "What Ever" (2015)
- "That's Bae" (2016)
- "We In Here" (2017)
- "Kung Pao" (2018)
- "Active" (2018)
- "Loyal" (2019)
- "Dumbstruck" (2019)
- "That's What She'd Say" (2019)
- "Christmas With You" (2019)
- "Secure The Bag" (2020)
- "BFF" (2020)
