= Christy Knowings =

American actress and comedian (1980–2026)

- Born: February 25, 1980; New York City, U.S.
- Died: August 11, 2026 (aged 46); Los Angeles, California, U.S.
- Occupations: Actress, comedienne
- Years active: 1997–2024
- Relatives: Chris Knowings (twin brother)
- Website: christyknowings.com

Christy Knowings (February 25, 1980 – August 11, 2026) was an American actress who was best known for performing on three seasons on the Nickelodeon sketch-comedy series All That (1997-2000).

== Career ==
Knowings performed on And Now This, a Rosie O'Donnell sketch-comedy television special produced by Nickelodeon. She subsequently joined the cast of All That in 1997 and remained on the series until the end of its sixth season in 2000. Her characters included Penny Lane, the dental assistant for Dr. Bynes, Lieutenant Fondue, Jessica from Whateverrr!!!, Yoko from CJ and the Cloudy Knights, Brenda Stone from Channel 6 1/2 News, and Winter Wonders from What Do You Do?. She made a small cameo appearance in the green room for the show's 10th anniversary special.

Knowings was a panelist on Figure It Out for several episodes. From 2008 to 2011, she made three appearances on episodes of Sesame Street, alongside her twin brother Chris Knowings, who portrayed recurring character Chris Robinson. In 2020, she released the folk single "To the World".

== Death ==
On August 7, 2026, Knowings suffered an asthma attack that left her with permanent brain damage. She was placed on life support and died at the age of 46 on August 11 at a Los Angeles–area hospital. Her All That castmates Kenan Thompson, Kel Mitchell, Josh Server, Lisa Foiles, Angelique Bates and the Sesame Street social media accounts paid tribute to her.
