= All That =

American sketch comedy television series

- Logo for the 2019 revival
- Genre: Sketch comedy
- Created by: Mike Tollin; Brian Robbins
- Narrated by: Soup; Dan Schneider; Kevin Kopelow; Brian Peck; Kenan Thompson; Jermaine Fowler; Burton Richardson; Angela Whittaker; James III
- Theme music composer: TLC; Arnold Hennings; RCA (seasons 7–10; remixed version of theme song)
- Opening theme: "All That", performed by TLC
- Composers: Richard Tuttobene (seasons 1–6); Scott Clausen (seasons 7–10); Niv Toar (season 11)
- Country of origin: United States
- Original language: English
- No. of seasons: 11
- No. of episodes: 210 (list of episodes)

Production
- Executive producers: Brian Robbins; Mike Tollin; Dan Schneider; Joe Davola; Kevin Kopelow; Heath Seifert; Rebecca Drysdale; Kenan Thompson; Kel Mitchell; Kevin Kay; Jermaine Fowler
- Producers: Dan Schneider; Kevin Kopelow; Heath Seifert; Virgil L. Fabian; Joe Catania; Keiren Fisher; Andrew Hill Newman; Steven Molaro; Ken Pisani; Chris Arrington; Shari Tavey
- Camera setup: Multi-camera
- Production companies: Nickelodeon Productions; Tollin/Robbins Productions; Schneider's Bakery; DJKay Entertainment; Kevin & Heath Productions

Original release
- Network: Nickelodeon
- Release: April 16, 1994 – October 22, 2005
- Release: June 15, 2019 – December 17, 2020

All That is an American sketch comedy children's television series created by Brian Robbins and Mike Tollin. The series originally aired on Nickelodeon from April 16, 1994, to October 22, 2005, lasting ten seasons, and was produced by Tollin/Robbins Productions and by Schneider's Bakery in season ten. The pilot episode was originally shown as a special "sneak peek" on April 16, 1994, with the show officially debuting as a regular series on January 21, 1995.

The series features original short comedic sketches and weekly musical guests aimed toward a young audience. Its sketches parody popular culture and are performed by a large and varying cast of child and teen actors. Early episodes were taped at Nickelodeon Studios at Universal Orlando Resort and then moved to Hollywood at the Nickelodeon on Sunset theatre, where other Nickelodeon shows such as The Amanda Show, Kenan & Kel, and Drake & Josh were taped.

All That went on to become a fixture on Nickelodeon for over a decade and has received acclaim for its diverse cast and impact on children's television. The series has spun off several members of the cast in their own Nickelodeon television series with varying levels of success. It has been marketed in several ways, including an audio recording, books, a feature film (with a sequel), festival tour, and numerous reunions and specials celebrating the legacy of All That.

In 2019, Robbins, then-president of Nickelodeon and co-creator of the original series, announced a revival of the series with original cast member Kenan Thompson serving as executive producer, with Kel Mitchell later confirmed in the same role. The eleventh season premiered on June 15, 2019, with musical guests The Jonas Brothers. Original cast members Lori Beth Denberg and Josh Server each appeared, and made sporadic appearances throughout the season. The last episode of the series aired on December 17, 2020, after production was permanently suspended due to the COVID-19 pandemic.

== History ==
=== Development ===
Brian Robbins and Michael Tollin created the show, and the head writer was Dan Schneider who also became the showrunner of the series in the third season. All That marked the beginning of Schneider's prolific career in creating and writing hit television series for young audiences. The New York Times, in separate articles, referred to Schneider as "the Norman Lear of children's television" and "the master of a television genre".

In 1986, Robbins and Schneider met when they were cast in the ABC sitcom Head of the Class, where they co-starred as Eric Mardian and Dennis Blunden, members of an honors program for gifted high school students. Becoming close friends, the two performers both shared a mutual interest in writing, eventually coming together to write and then pitch an episode to the show's producers just to see if they could do it. To their amazement, the producers liked their idea and bought it. Their episode ("Will the Real Arvid Engen Please Stand Up") later aired during the show's second season in 1988.

Following the success of Head of the Class, Robbins and Schneider were asked to co-host the second annual Kids Choice Awards in 1988 alongside Tony Danza and Debbie Gibson. Although they were unaware of the fledgling Nickelodeon cable channel, the two agreed to participate. The award ceremony that year was produced by Albie Hecht, with whom Robbins and Schneider quickly struck up a friendship. Their friendship continued after the awards, and Hecht suggested they develop something for Nickelodeon. Robbins and Schneider declined his offer, as they were still under contract with ABC.

By 1991, after Head of the Class ended its five-season run, Robbins started a production company with producer friend Mike Tollin, aptly named Tollin/Robbins Productions. The company originally produced several small-budget sports documentaries.

Hecht, now Head of Development for Nickelodeon, contacted them and asked them to tape a project for the network. The half-hour documentary they made featured two of the network's game show hosts, Phil Moore (Nick Arcade) and Mike O'Malley (Get the Picture and Nickelodeon GUTS), as co-hosts of a comedy tour as they drove around to different cities to perform. Since their schedule only permitted for two days of taping, Tollin/Robbins had to make the entire show appear as if they had toured around the country.

Impressed with the final product, Hecht later met with Robbins to discuss developing something, asking Robbins if there was any type of show that he would be interested in making. Robbins pitched an idea of creating a kid-friendly version of Saturday Night Live, which cast member Kenan Thompson would later join in 2003. He brought Tollin and Schneider (as head writer) along to help develop the show. The three were influenced by classic sketch shows such as The Carol Burnett Show, You Can't Do That on Television and Laugh In, and began to flesh out a rough idea of the show's format. Schneider decided against writing the pilot episode and instead chose to compile the cast first. Usually, in television, the pilot is written first and the cast is assembled later. However, the three believed it was crucial to find the right actors first and then tailor to their strengths. A nationwide talent search for child and teen actors was launched that would last for several months. Eventually, Angelique Bates, Lori Beth Denberg, Katrina Johnson, Kel Mitchell, Alisa Reyes, Josh Server, and Thompson were hired.

=== Original series (1994–2000) ===
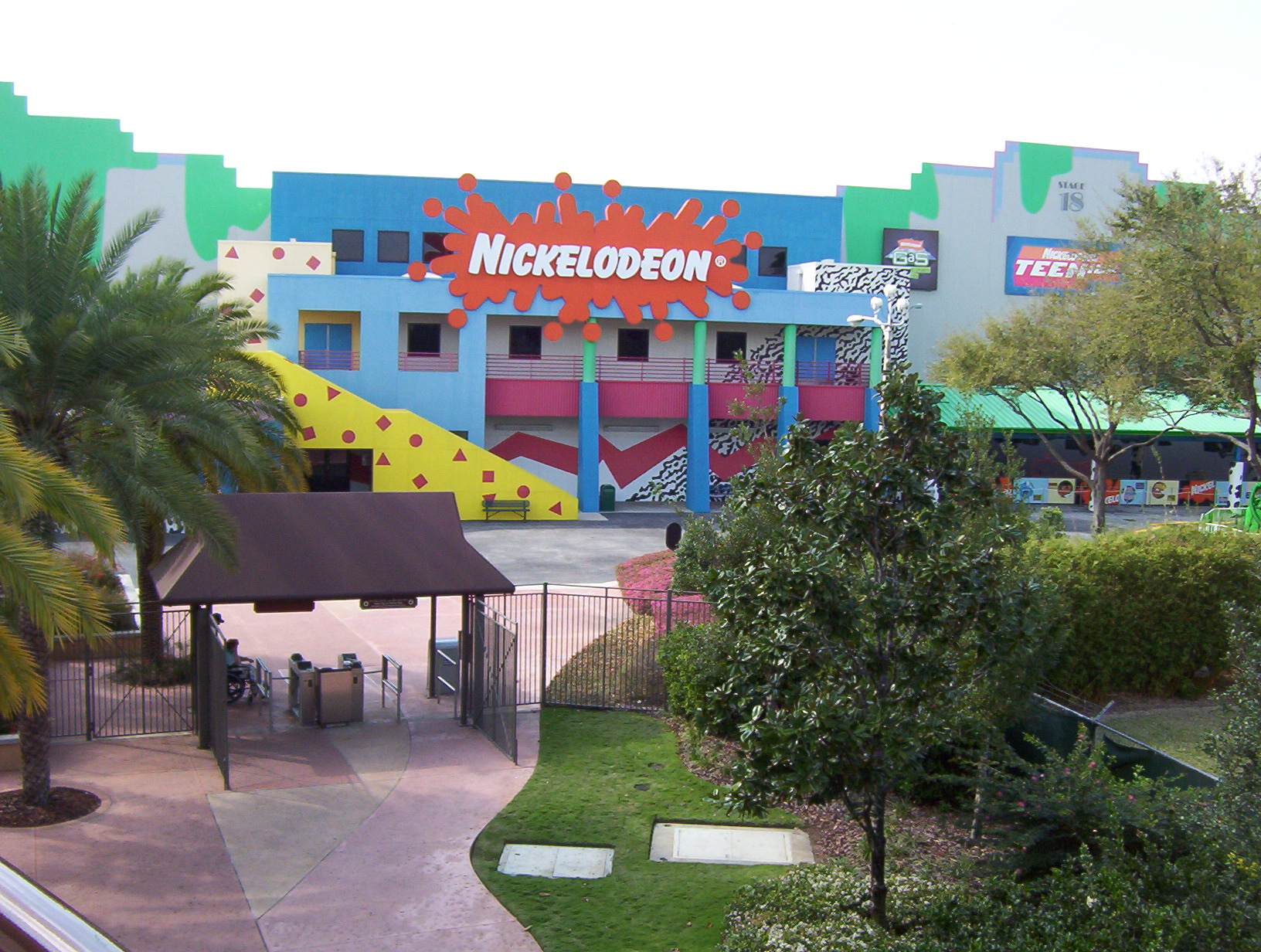
Exterior of the former Nickelodeon Studios where All That was taped for its first two seasons

The basic concept for the series was a half-hour show that featured a cold open (which featured the cast participating in varying juvenile acts in a green room or around the studio before the show starts), several different sketches; including "runners" (short-length sketches), and then a musical performance to close out the episode. The main staple was the Vital Information sketch, which would go on to be featured in every show through the end of the sixth season (some people compared it to the long-running SNL segment Weekend Update). Cast and crew flew out to Nickelodeon Studios at Universal Studios Florida in Orlando to shoot the pilot in front of a studio audience on January 17, 1994. After taping was completed, the pilot was shelved as screenings did not test well with the focus groups, consisting of children, both boys and girls in different age groups, that Nickelodeon used. The scores showed that "kids probably wouldn't like this new sketch comedy show for kids". Regardless of the negative response, Geraldine Laybourne (then President of Nickelodeon) decided to pick the series up.

During the first season, writing partners Kevin Kopelow and Heath Seifert were brought on as producers and continued working in that capacity through the third season. They continued their relationship with Thompson and Mitchell by co-executive producing and head-writing the spin-off series Kenan & Kel and eventually writing the feature film Good Burger (1997) with Schneider.

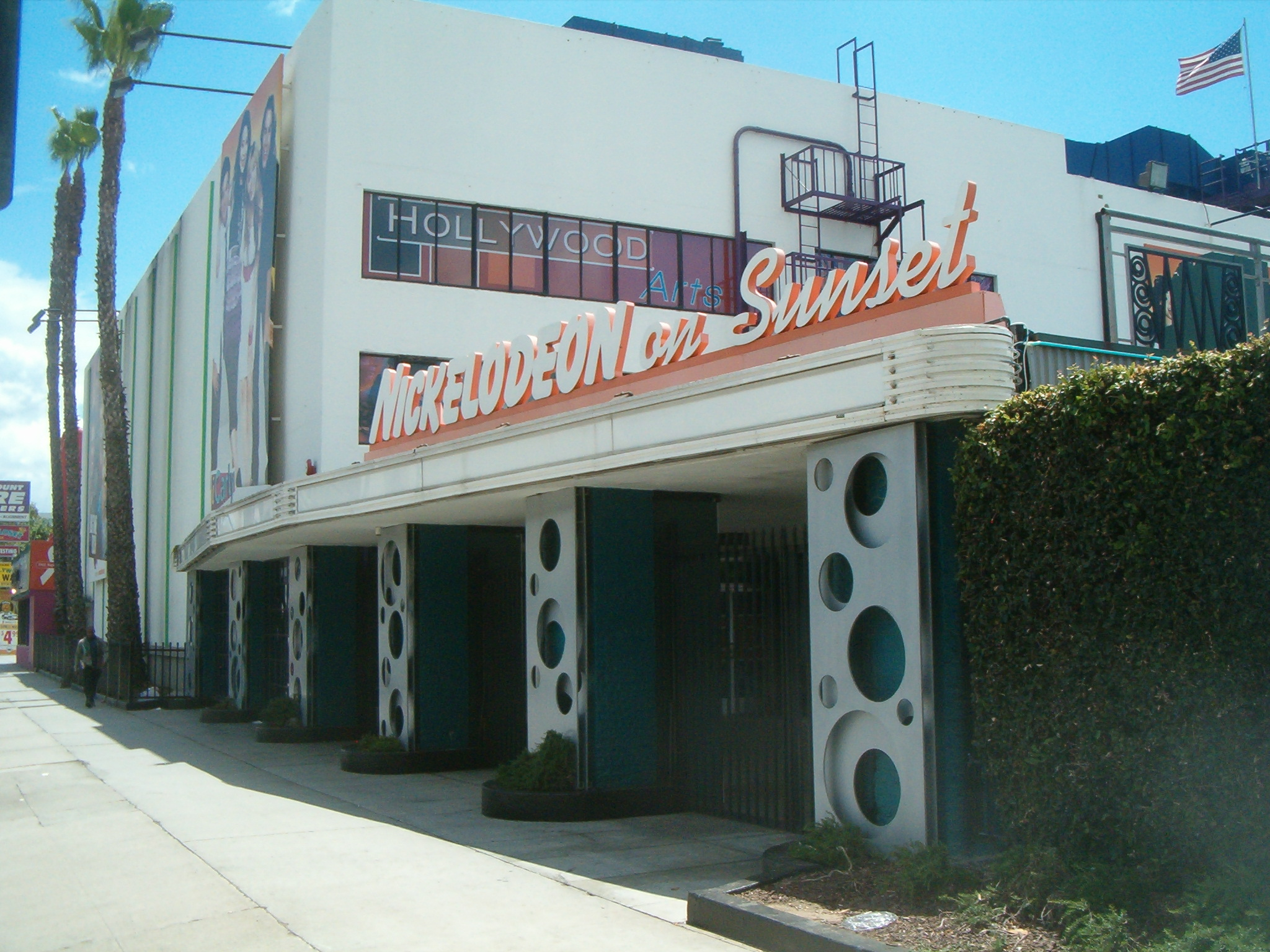
Nickelodeon on Sunset, at 6230 Sunset Boulevard, as seen in May 2011. All That was taped here until its cancellation in 2005.

After production on the second season wrapped in 1996, the show moved out of the old Nickelodeon Studios at Universal Orlando Resort in Florida. The network, interested in moving production of their live-action series to the West Coast, began scouting soundstages in California. Production for the third season was completed at the Paramount Pictures studio lot before Nickelodeon obtained a lease for the 6230 Sunset Boulevard facility. During this period, Bates left the show and was replaced by Amanda Bynes. A Nickelodeon producer discovered Bynes while she attended a children's comedy camp at L.A.'s Laugh Factory. At the end of the third season, Johnson and Reyes left the show.

In 1997, Nickelodeon purchased the Sunset Boulevard property (formerly The Earl Carrol Theater) and rechristened it as Nickelodeon on Sunset. Production for the series would remain there until the end of the tenth season in 2005. The fourth season began with the additions of Leon Frierson, Christy Knowings, and Danny Tamberelli to the cast. Knowings and Tamberelli were known to Nickelodeon producers having both participated in other projects for the network; Knowings was discovered while taping a pilot for a show called And Now This; Tamberelli was the star of The Adventures of Pete & Pete, and guest starred on the Nickelodeon game show Figure It Out where he befriended fellow guest star Kopelow. At the end of the fourth season, Denberg and Schneider left the show. Schneider initially left the series to create the short-lived UPN sitcom Guys Like Us, and later took over a fledgling pilot for Bynes that would become The Amanda Show.

For the fifth season, Kopelow and Seifert took over Schneider's responsibilities as head writers and co-executive producers; Tamberelli succeeded Denberg as the new Vital Information anchor; added to the cast were Nick Cannon and Mark Saul. Although a teenager at the time, Cannon previously worked as the audience warm up and writer for the show before joining the cast.

On March 13, 1999, Nickelodeon celebrated the series in an hour-long special episode dubbed All That Live, in honor of the show's "100th episode" (although it was chronologically the 85th episode to be aired on the network). The episode was the first, and only occurrence in the show's history done entirely live in front of a studio audience. The 100th episode featured several celebrity guests: Melissa Joan Hart (Sabrina the Teenage Witch and Nickelodeon's Clarissa Explains It All), Larisa Oleynik (Nickelodeon's The Secret World of Alex Mack), Robert Ri'chard (Nickelodeon's Cousin Skeeter), and Britney Spears (in a taped video appearance; Spears was originally supposed to perform in person but had to back out due to a knee injury and Lauryn Hill took her place) all made appearances; with Bates, Denberg, Johnson and Reyes appearing as well.

After the 100th episode, the show won the Kids' Choice Award for Favorite TV Show on May 1, 1999. The fifth season ended with the departures of Mitchell and Thompson. Stand-up comedian Gabriel Iglesias (who, at 24, was much older than the otherwise preteen-to-late-teenage cast) was hired to replace the two for the following season. The abbreviated sixth season was followed by a nationwide summer tour, the All That Music and More Festival, hosted by the cast and headlined by featured musical guests. Kopelow, Seifert and the entire cast left the series soon after. In their absence, Schneider returned as showrunner.

=== Relaunch series (2002–2005) ===
In 2000, All That was put on hiatus to be relaunched with a new cast. During the hiatus, Nickelodeon ran a series of specials. Production for the seventh season started back up a year later after an extensive nationwide talent search for child and teen actors. Ultimately hired were Chelsea Brummet, Jack DeSena, Lisa Foiles, Bryan Hearne, Shane Lyons, Giovonnie Samuels, and Kyle Sullivan. The format of the series remained roughly the same as the original seasons, but episodes now featured a weekly guest host who would appear alongside the cast in sketches, just as Saturday Night Live had incorporated since its 1975 premiere (the weekly host was gradually phased out of the show later on). Vital Information was also dropped and replaced with a new regular segment titled Know Your Stars. The first episode of the "new" All That featured special guests Frankie Muniz and Aaron Carter and debuted on January 19, 2002.

The eighth season opened with the addition of Britney Spears' younger sister, Jamie Lynn Spears, to the cast. In addition, All That cast members were also included in a new wraparound segment during the SNICK lineup, the SNICK On-Air Dare, in which they attempted various dares (such as a now-infamous segment, later recalled in the 2024 Investigation Discovery documentary Quiet on Set: The Dark Side of Kids TV, in which Hearne was painted with peanut butter that would be licked off him by a pack of dogs); occasionally, On-Air Dares featured special guests from other Nickelodeon shows. Hearne left the series just as Nickelodeon was promoting a new competition series, R U All That?: Nickelodeon's Search for the Funniest Kid in America, in which the grand prize winner would be given an opportunity to become a cast member on All That. After this contest ended in 2003, the finals aired on the network on July 26, 2003. The contest picked five finalists, all of whom would perform a sketch with the current cast. The winner of R U All That? was Christina Kirkman, who would officially join the cast in ninth season; the competition's runner-up, Ryan Coleman, would join the cast later that year. At the end of the ninth season, Lyons, Samuels and Spears departed the series. Spears left to focus on a new Nickelodeon sitcom that Schneider had created, Zoey 101.

In 2005, the tenth season began with a celebration of the show's tenth anniversary. As part of the event, Nickelodeon aired episodes from the first six seasons of All That in the week leading up to a "reunion special" on April 23, 2005, hosted by Muniz and featuring Ashanti and Bow Wow as the musical guests. The special featured cast members from both the original and relaunch series performing in sketches together. And, after a hiatus, the Vital Information sketch was brought back with Lil' JJ, winner of sister channel BET's Coming to the Stage competition, as the anchor. The special also introduced Kianna Underwood and Denzel Whitaker as new cast members. Approximately 6.2 million total viewers watched the special on both its April 23 and 24 airings, making it the top cable or broadcast program for the 2–11, 6–11, and 9–14 age demographics, and TV.com gave it a rating of 8.7/10.

Chronologically, the anniversary special and season were taped in the fall of 2004, before being aired on Nickelodeon the following year. After the anniversary, the new season began airing a week later. The tenth season would mark the end of the relaunch era of the show as Foiles announced the show's cancellation on her Yahoo! Movies account, stating:

I know there's been a lot of speculating on the subject of All That being canceled, and I thought I'd be the one to tell you that it's true. All That has finally come to an end. I found out a few weeks ago, but didn't know if I should tell anyone. I guess if ten years is long enough for Friends, and it's long enough for us, too! I probably would have moved on anyway, even if it didn't get canceled. I was getting a little too old for the show and I believe that it should always have a cast of younger kids, no older than 18. Where I will go from here, I'm not sure, but I have a few things in the works. All I ask is that you guys keep me and the other cast members in your prayers, that we can step into bigger and better things!:)
So, I guess that's....All That!!!

— Luv Alwayz – Lisa

=== Revival series (2019–2020) ===
In the fall of 2018, Brian Robbins, co-creator of the series, was formally announced as the new president of Nickelodeon. Now in charge of the company's programming unit, Robbins expressed interest in a revival of the show, saying, in an interview with The Hollywood Reporter, that:

I would've never, ever, ever canceled the show. It should've been [Nickelodeon's] Saturday Night Live. All That was a very sophisticated show. Young humor, but the level of comedy on that show was sophisticated.

— Robbins

The show's revival was announced as part of Nickelodeon's 2019 content slate on February 14, 2019. On May 14, 2019, it was announced that the show would premiere on June 15, 2019, with Kenan Thompson and Kel Mitchell serving as executive producers; Kevin Kopelow and Heath Seifert returning as consulting producers; and the involvement of former cast members in sketches. However, Dan Schneider, former executive producer of the series, would not be involved with the second relaunch as Nickelodeon had cut ties with Schneider in 2018.

By 2017, Nickelodeon had ceased all operations at the Nickelodeon on Sunset lot and the property was later sold. Production for the revival series was done at The Burbank Studios (formerly known as NBC Studios) in Burbank, California. The new cast was officially revealed on Today with Hoda & Jenna on May 29, 2019. The cast included Ryan Alessi, Reece Caddell, Kate Godfrey, Gabrielle Green, Nathan Janak, Lex Lumpkin, and Chinguun Sergelen. An expanded episode order, adding 13 episodes to the initial 13, was announced in October 2019, along with Aria Brooks being added to the cast starting with episode 14. An additional ten episodes were ordered in February 2020, with eight of them being completed before production was suspended due to the COVID-19 pandemic in March 2020. However, despite the postponement, the twelfth season was originally planned during a interview with Sergelen in October 2020, but was scrapped; Green would confirm in 2024 on an Instagram post that All That was indeed cancelled by ViacomCBS in 2021, around the time that she was set to begin work as a co-star on the Nickelodeon show, That Girl Lay Lay, without having a reason for the cancellation.

The format of the series remained roughly the same as the original era and the relaunch era. Minor changes to the format included the traditional cold open (which featured the cast in a green room or around the studio before the show started) occasionally appearing later in an episode rather than at the beginning; Vital Information, now sporadically appearing, was kept on with Caddell as anchor; and Know Your Stars was dropped for the revival.

The revival series featured the involvement of former cast members appearing regularly with the new cast in sketches. Numerous classic characters from the previous eras were revived as well. Besides Mitchell and Thompson; Lori Beth Denberg, Lisa Foiles, Alisa Reyes, Mark Saul, Josh Server, and Jamie Lynn Spears all returned to cameo.

In celebration of the show's return to Nickelodeon, a Good Burger pop-up location opened to fans in Santa Monica, California. With the purchase of a ticket, guests have access to a menu inspired by the sketch and film, a small arcade, and memorabilia and set pieces.

== Cast ==
The sketches of All That are performed by a large and varying cast of child, teen, and young adult actors.

== Musical guests ==
Each episode of All That features a musical guest that closes out the show. Later seasons featured a weekly host who would appear alongside the cast in sketches (the weekly host was gradually phased out of the show later on).

== Episodes ==
Season	Episodes	Originally released	
Season	Episodes	First released	Last released
1	15	April 16, 1994	April 29, 1995
2	21	October 7, 1995	October 26, 1996
3	20	November 16, 1996	November 8, 1997
4	21	November 15, 1997	December 5, 1998
5	24	December 19, 1998	January 8, 2000
6	19	January 15, 2000	February 24, 2001
7	13	January 19, 2002	May 4, 2002
8	14	September 21, 2002	July 26, 2003
9	16	October 11, 2003	February 21, 2004
10	13	April 23, 2005	October 22, 2005
11	35	June 15, 2019	December 17, 2020

== Sketches ==
All That features original short comedic sketches that parody popular culture. Although the show had a team of writers, the cast was encouraged to help contribute their own ideas for characters and other segments. Improv and ad-libbing were used to help the cast and writers find the right tone for a certain skit. The following is a short list of some sketches that aired during the show's tenure.

Sketch Name	Major Players	Description
"Ask Ashley"	Amanda Bynes	A little girl named Ashley, who offers advice from her bedroom on a TV series. She was sweet and friendly until she reads letters sent in by clueless viewers. After reading a letter, Ashley would go on a tirade against the letter's author.
"Detective Dan"	Josh Server	A hopelessly incompetent police detective who frequently stumbled into a crime scene to make matters worse. In the revival series, Kate Godfrey came into the sketch as Dan's daughter "Detective Ann".
"Shark Cave"	Reece Caddell, Gabrielle Green, Lex Lumpkin	Cave people judges decide on items its creators hope will be a success in the future. This is a mash-up parody of Shark Tank and the Stone Age culture.
"Everyday French with Pierre Escargot"	Kenan Thompson	Pierre sits in a bathtub filled with suds, wearing a raincoat and matching hat and swim fins on his feet. In the sketch, he would say silly phrases in poorly-pronounced French and translate them into English.
"Know Your Stars"	various	A random voice (performed by Brian Peck from seasons 7–8 and Dan Schneider from seasons 9–10) that made an impersonation of an individual with embarrassing, wacky, funny and untrue facts and info about a cast member or special guest.
"Good Burger"	Kel Mitchell (seasons 1–5, 11), Ryan Coleman (season 9)	Ed, the cashier at a fast-food restaurant, is a clueless teenager who always found a way to mess things up. Good Burger was later made into a feature film.
"The Loud Librarian"	Lori Beth Denberg	A librarian who frequently engaged in extremely noisy and distracting activities. When students complained or made noise themselves, she would shout "QUIET! THIS IS A LIBRARY!" along with a variety of noisemakers, failing to notice the hypocrisy.
"Cancelled with Nathan"	Nathan Janak	Nathan (as himself) is in a hot tub on a tropical island and rants about things that bother him and should be cancelled.
"Sugar and Coffee"	Lisa Foiles, Kyle Sullivan	Extremely hyperactive hosts of their own talk show, the pair would eat pure sugar and drink massive amounts of coffee and then force their guests to do the same thing from giant orbs attached to the ceiling, which usually led to overactivity in the worst way.
"Thelma Stump"	Jamie Lynn Spears	An elderly woman who serves as a bodyguard and security guard for the backstage of All That.
"Vital Information"	Lori Beth Denberg (seasons 1–4), Danny Tamberelli (seasons 5 and 6), Lil' JJ (season 10), Reece Caddell (season 11)	The host deadpans one-liners, usually three in a row to the audience. This recurring sketch was the centerpiece of the show before the relaunch.
"Miss Piddlin"	Kenan Thompson	Miss Piddlin, the lunch lady at Dullmont Jr. High School, has a terrifying fixation on peas and tries to force every child to eat them. Anyone who dislikes peas or offends her becomes the target of her "beast-like strength." The sketch features pea-based parodies of popular songs such as "Eat a Pea" and "Peas Are a Few of My Favorite Things".
"Getting Rid of Your Stuff"	Kate Godfrey	Host Marie Kiddo (a parody of Marie Kondo) visits other guests' houses and schools and goes through various things that they own. She asks the guests if the item brings them joy; if it does, the item is kept, but if it doesn't bring them joy (even if it belongs to a family member or friend), she violently destroys the item and screams "DESTROY!"
"Life with Peter and Flem"	Kel Mitchell as Peter, Josh Server as Flem, Dan Schneider as Narrator	Loosely based on Goofus and Gallant, the boys shows an over the top dos and don'ts in proper etiquette. Peter shows the right way to do things, while Flem shows the wrong way to do things by using his own methods.

== Impact and legacy ==
All That is highly regarded for its large diverse cast both in terms of ethnicity and gender. The show was praised in The Atlantic for breaking the classical norms set in children's TV with its cast, irreverent and unapologetic humor, and kid characters played by actual kids.

When All That debuted in 1994, television was still primarily segregated by race as shown by popular sitcoms like Seinfeld (where the cast is completely white) or Martin (where the cast is entirely black); even Saturday Night Live was dominated by white male comedians. Robbins, Schneider and Tollin wanted the show to reflect its audience and also sought out varying musical acts (alternative, hip hop and R&B among others) to embrace the diversity.

I was the first black female they had on that show...there weren't that many black shows on or black actors. When I left, it opened it up more for black female comedians. I've had people come back and tell me it felt like I passed the torch because they were all on TV watching like, "I want to do that, I want to do that," but then when they saw me, they thought, "Oh, I can actually do that." Black girls were coming up to me, parents are just like, "Thank you so much for what you've done." I was like wow. It feels surreal.

— Angelique Bates

I thought it was awesome because none of us look like each other. We were like a total melting pot of diversity...You have African-American, you have me [Hispanic], you have Caucasian. ... So there are kids that were able to sit home and go, I look like her, I look like him, I can relate. That was really important for me to be a part of a cast that was filled of diversity 'cause there's nothing more boring than a Brady Bunch concept. So at the end of the day, I was able to have the fans verbally tell me how they felt that All That impacted their lives and it made them come home and look forward to coming home and watching the show after school when they work on their homework, and how they loved to be able to have a little bit of music maybe their mom didn't let them necessarily listen to some of the music or whatever the case may be.

— Alisa Reyes

=== Awards and nominations ===
Ceremony	Award	Outcome	Note
1997 Kids' Choice Awards	Favorite TV Show	Nominated	
1998 Kids' Choice Awards	Favorite TV Actor	Nominated	Kenan Thompson & Kel Mitchell – All That / Kenan & Kel
1999 Kids' Choice Awards	Favorite TV Show	Won	
2000 Kids' Choice Awards	Favorite TV Show	Won	
2000 Kids' Choice Awards	Favorite TV Actor	Won	Kenan Thompson
2000 Kids' Choice Awards	Favorite TV Actress	Won	Amanda Bynes – All That / The Amanda Show
2001 Kids' Choice Awards	Favorite TV Actor	Nominated	Nick Cannon
2002 Kids' Choice Awards	Favorite TV Show	Nominated	
2003 Kids' Choice Awards	Favorite TV Show	Nominated	
2003 Kids' Choice Awards	Favorite TV Actress	Won	Amanda Bynes – All That / The Amanda Show
2004 Kids' Choice Awards	Favorite TV Show	Won	
2019 Teen Choice Awards	Choice Throwback TV Show	Nominated	
2020 Kids' Choice Awards	Favorite Kids' TV Show	Nominated	

== Reunion events ==
In 2011, Lisa Foiles joined forces with Comikaze Expo, planning the first ever All That reunion with Comikaze Expo CEO Regina Carpinelli. The reunion featured a roundtable discussion, where the cast reflected on their tenure on the show and received questions from the audience. Angelique Bates, Lori Beth Denberg, Lisa Foiles, Leon Frierson, Katrina Johnson, Kevin Kopelow, Kel Mitchell, Alisa Reyes, Giovonnie Samuels, Mark Saul, Josh Server all participated in the event.

Also in 2011, Bates, Johnson, and Reyes appeared together at Zooey Magazine's One Year Anniversary Special Event held in Hollywood. The anniversary launched the Love Is Louder campaign which speaks out against bullying and hate messages.

In the 2011 special "iParty with Victorious" (a crossover between iCarly and Victorious), when Carly Shay (portrayed by Miranda Cosgrove) asks Kenan Thompson for a favor, he jokingly complains that everyone wants to borrow money from him, including Andy Samberg (Thompson's Saturday Night Live co-star) and half of the original cast of All That.

In 2015, Mitchell and Thompson reunited on The Tonight Show Starring Jimmy Fallon where they performed a special Good Burger sketch. Dan Schneider returned to write the sketch for the show.

In 2015, Comikaze Expo held the second All That reunion. Angelique Bates, Chelsea Brummet, Ryan Coleman, Lori Beth Denberg, Jack DeSena, Lisa Foiles, Bryan Hearne, Katrina Johnson, Christina Kirkman, Christy Knowings, Kel Mitchell, Alisa Reyes, Giovonnie Samuels, Mark Saul, Josh Server, and Danny Tamberelli all participated in the event.

From April 16–17, 2016, to celebrate the show's 22nd anniversary, TeenNick (as part of its The Splat programming block) aired a reunion special consisting of new 3–4 minute shorts with most of the original cast, including Thompson and Mitchell.

In 2018, Lori Beth Denberg, Kel Mitchell, Josh Server, and Kenan Thompson appeared together on an episode of Nick Cannon's MTV series Wild 'n Out.

== Spin-offs ==
=== Kenan & Kel ===
Kenan & Kel is an American teen comedy sitcom created by Kim Bass for Nickelodeon. It starred then-All That cast members Kenan Thompson and Kel Mitchell. Sixty-five episodes and a made-for-TV movie Two Heads Are Better Than None were produced over four seasons. The first two seasons were taped at Nickelodeon Studios in Orlando, Florida, and the remaining two were taped at the Nick on Sunset theater in Hollywood.

=== The Amanda Show ===
The Amanda Show is an American live action sketch comedy and variety show that aired on Nickelodeon from October 16, 1999, to September 21, 2002. It starred Amanda Bynes, Drake Bell, and Nancy Sullivan, along with several performing artists who came and left at different points.

=== The Nick Cannon Show ===
The premise of the semi-scripted show was that its star, Nick Cannon, a former cast member on All That, would come across a situation he thought needed changing and then "take over" to make things better, or at least funnier.

== Films ==
All That made one effort in developing a popular sketch into a feature-length film with Good Burger. Co-creator Mike Tollin said:

You get something like Good Burger and you just ride it, and all of a sudden there's something called Nickelodeon Movies, put under the banner of Paramount. It was a big synergy. We just took a shot. ... There was an unforgettable day when we went to Paramount with a script. The Paramount execs were interested enough to come to a table read. I don't believe any money had been spent. We realized this was a huge opportunity. Kenan and Kel came and we filled in with other actors. ... It was late January 1997, and he (John Goldwyn a senior executive at Paramount [came back and said], "The good news is we're going to make this movie; the bad news is it needs to be in theaters in July." The typical gestation period for movies is five to seven years. Brian signed up to direct and we shot the film locally, built Good Burger, brought in Sinbad, brought in Jenny, brought in the whole cast of characters. Twenty years later I got a call from my niece from Chicago who said, "I just watched the best movie." That thing worked.

The movie was released in theaters on July 25, 1997, with a budget of roughly $10 million. The film holds a score of 33% on Rotten Tomatoes based on 45 reviews. Most praise came to Kel Mitchell and Kenan Thompson's performances. Although the film received mixed to negative reviews from critics, it received positive reviews from fans and it was a financial success. A sequel, Good Burger 2, was released in 2023.

== In other media ==
=== All That: The Album ===
On November 26, 1996, Nickelodeon released an All That CD titled All That: The Album. It contains All That dialogues from the show, and songs sung by musical guests (i.e. Faith Evans, Coolio, Brandy, Naughty By Nature, etc.). All That's theme opening by TLC and outro theme were released on this CD. Music from the CD is mainly inspired by the show.

=== All That: Fresh out the Box ===
On October 1, 1998, Nickelodeon released a 112-page book of All That called All That: Fresh out the Box by Steve Holland. The book contains information of the show's sketches, cast members and points of the show. It also contains different character information as well.

=== Live tour ===
On June 30, 2000, Nickelodeon gave All That a promotional summer tour titled All That! Music and More Festival, which traveled all over the United States and was hosted by the cast of All That. The tour began after Season 6 and lasted until September 3, 2000. The tour mainly featured the cast members of All That and a musical guest. Many of the musical guests joined and performed during the tour. Also while the tour went on, the cast members did numerous live sketches. There was also a ticket contest the year before the festival began. On July 29, 2000, Nickelodeon broadcast the highlights and events that happened during the entire festival.

=== iTunes ===
On August 15, 2011, the iTunes Store released All That: Volume 1 with the first seven episodes from season two. On November 29, 2011, the iTunes Store released All That: Volume 2 with seven more episodes from season two. All That: Volume 3 was released in 2012 with seven episodes from season two. Just like The '90s Are All That (later re-titled NickRewind) programming block airings on TeenNick, the musical guest performances are omitted and the end credits are re-done as generic white text on black. All That Volume 4, with episodes from the start of season 3, was released on iTunes August 13, 2012; however, episodes 40 and 43 are excluded for unknown reasons with episodes 45 and 46 included instead.

On June 24, 2013, the iTunes Store released All That: Retro Essentials with four episodes from season two. The episodes are 217, 220, 228, 237. Episodes 217, 220 and 228 were re-released with the musical guest performances. Episode 237 has the musical guest edited out.

== Reruns/syndication ==
All That ran on Nickelodeon from 1994 until 2005. All That aired on Nick at Nite on Mondays to Thursdays at 8:00 pm from June 25, 2012, until July 12, 2012, alongside Kenan & Kel at 8:30 p.m. EST. The Nick at Nite airings, had the musical performances edited out. All That ran in reruns on The N (during its daytime block of TEENick shows) from March 12, 2008, to September 15, 2008.

On July 25, 2011, TeenNick debuted a block named after the show, The '90s Are All That. All That aired as part of the block from its launch until December 27, 2012. The '90s Are All That airings, however, also have the musical guest performances edited out, along with their introduction sketches (presumably for time and the high cost of obtaining music distribution rights). It initially only aired episodes from seasons 2 and 3, later adding seasons 4 and 5 into the rotation. However, the reruns on The N in 2008 aired seasons 3 and 5 uncut and retained the musical guest performances (with the exception of the K-Ci & JoJo episode). The final rotation of these reruns included seasons 6 and 7.

=== Streaming ===
Seasons four and five are available to stream on Paramount+. On May 24, 2022, Netflix announced that select seasons of All That, Kenan & Kel, and Ned's Declassified School Survival Guide would be available to stream starting June 21.
