= Leon Frierson =

American actor

- Born: Leon Curtis Frierson; July 6, 1986 (age 40); Ontario, California, U.S.
- Other name: Leeboy
- Occupations: Actor, rapper, songwriter, comedian
- Years active: 1997–present
- Children: 2

Leon Curtis Frierson (born July 6, 1986) is an American actor, rapper, songwriter, and comedian, best known for his work on the Nickelodeon comedy show All That.

== Early life ==
Frierson was born in Anaheim but moved around as a kid including San Diego, L.A., Ontario and landing in Pomona, California.

== All That ==
In 1997, Frierson, Christy Knowings, and Danny Tamberelli joined the cast of All That to replace the departing Katrina Johnson and Alisa Reyes. Frierson's agent had called him about the job, and he auditioned at the Nickelodeon/MTV building in Los Angeles. He did impressions of "an old man, nerds, Jim Carrey and Mike Tyson."

Leon's recurring sketches and/or characters include Have a Nice Day with Leroy & Fuzz, CJ and the Cloudy Nights, Repairboy (with Kel Mitchell as Repairman), and Billy Fuco. He stayed on the show until the end of Season 6 in 2000. He also appeared, during his run on All That, as a panelist on the network's game show Figure It Out.

In the Investigation Discovery docuseries Quiet on Set: The Dark Side of Kids TV, Frierson recalled being uncomfortable when forced to wear leotards or costumes he felt were suggestive. Frierson said he believed his inability to maintain the success he had as a child actor after leaving the entertainment business directly led to his alcoholism later in life. On the That's F***ed Up Podcast, Frierson also revealed that he was paid about 1/10 as much as cast members from other networks.

== Later career ==
When Frierson ended his run on All That, he had appeared in the movies Bulworth and Snow Day. He also appeared in a December 12, 2003 episode of Boston Public as Brady Bennett.

== Filmography ==
=== Film ===
Year	Title	Role
1998	Bulworth	Osgood
2000	Snow Day	Odd Ball Kid
2009	Absolute Evil	Dillon
2011	Road 2 Damascus	Dancer

=== Television ===
Year	Title	Role	Notes
1995	There Goes a...	Leon	1 episode, Rockin Real Wheels: Santa Songs
1997–2000	All That	Various	Castmember
2002	The Bernie Mac Show		1 episode, Bernie Mac, Ladies Man
2003	Boston Public	Brady Bennett	1 episode, Chapter Seventy-Five
2007	Cavemen	Lyle	1 episode, The Mascot
2024	Quiet on Set: The Dark Side of Kids TV	Himself	2 episodes
