= Mark Saul =

American actor

- Born: Mark Adam Saul; June 20, 1985 (age 41); Los Angeles, California, U.S.
- Occupations: Actor, musician
- Years active: 1998–present
- Spouse: Ilana Berger (m. 2012)
- Children: 3
- Website: www.markadamsaul.com

Mark Adam Saul (born June 20, 1985) is an American actor who is best known for appearing on the popular Nickelodeon show All That in the final two seasons of the show's first era. His other notable credits include The Social Network, Parks and Recreation, Rules of Engagement, Bones, Desperate Housewives, and Body of Proof. He also portrayed Dr. Steve “Two” Mostow in Grey's Anatomy from seasons 4 to 8.

== Early life ==
Saul was born in Los Angeles, California on June 20, 1985. He was born into a family of Eastern European descent. He has an older sister, Deanna, who is a costume designer. Saul was raised in the West Hills section of Los Angeles, where he attended Pomelo Drive Elementary School, George Ellery Hale Middle School, and El Camino Real High School. At the age of 10, Saul won first place in a writing contest sponsored by the California Writers' Club San Fernando Valley Branch. He got his start singing, dancing, and acting in a musical theater. He won first place at a Shakespeare Festival Competition.

Saul has also appeared in numerous national commercials. He got his first break in starring in Nickelodeon's All That. It was his first TV series.

== All That ==
After the departure of Lori Beth Denberg, Saul joined the cast of All That as a featured player in 1998, with Nick Cannon. Saul's most famous sketch was Stuart, a guy who would pretend to be something. His catchphrase was, "Well, if I was _________, I'd be the greatest _______ in all the land, and people will gather 'round and say, "Oh Stuart, you're the greatest _________ EVER!. Now there's only one thing left to do. Let me hop on my _____, and fly away." During the All That auditions, he did a male version of the Ask Ashley segment. Ironically, in one of the show's episodes, his character "Stuart" ends up taking over Ask Ashley where he is dressed in female's clothing. Saul and Cannon were promoted to contract status in the sixth season, becoming the first featured players to be promoted in the show's history, and lasted until the end of the first era in 2000. He appeared in the 10th Anniversary Reunion Special, despite not having any lines.

Like many other Nickelodeon stars at the time, he was also a contestant on the show Figure It Out, mostly appearing in the final season, Figure It Out: Wild Style. He was known as one of the guys to ask the stupid yet funny questions on the show.

== Post- All That ==
After leaving the show, he continued on his education at El Camino Real High School in the San Fernando Valley, where he participated in the Thespians Club and Drama class. He was also president of his high school club Comedy Sportz League. He had starred in a lead role in his high school film project, "Passing Moments". The film was released on May 24, 2003, in the Los Angeles area only. He had recently graduated from California State University, Northridge with a Bachelor's Art in Screenwriting.

Saul had a band called Another Man's Trash, and their video, "Such a Fantasy" aired on VH1.

In 2012, Saul starred in a commercial for popular California chain restaurant, Jack in the Box, as a young man getting ready to marry a bacon burger.

He starred on Grey's Anatomy as Steve Mostow, an intern in Seattle Grace Hospital. When he's not on set, Saul is creating art for his Etsy shop, Novel Brand, writing and performing with his sketch comedy group, Rat Pageant, and playing in the folk/rock band, The Flashcards.

He made a guest appearance on Lab Rats: Bionic Island as Dr. Ryan.

== Personal life ==
Saul married Ilana Berger, his high school girlfriend on June 2, 2012. The couple lives in the Silver Lake enclave of Los Angeles with their two cats and their three children, Eden, Arlo, and Story.

== Filmography ==
=== Film ===
Year	Title	Role	Notes
2002	The Banger Sisters	Additional Voice	
2003	Passing Moments	Mark	Short film
2010	The Social Network	Bob	
2012	To Write Love on Her Arms	Dylan	
2012	Freaky Deaky	Kenny	
2013	Red Line	Boyd	
2013	Speed Queen	Bob	Short film
2014	Distance	Wiley Rupp	Short film
2016	First Date from Hell	Paul	Short film

=== Television ===
Year	Title	Role	Notes
1998–2000	All That	Various	29 episodes
1999	Zenon: Girl of the 21st Century	Additional Voice	Television film Uncredited
2000	Nickelodeon Kids' Choice Awards 2000	Himself	Television special
2000	Geppetto		Television film
2003	The Nick Cannon Show	Ricardo	Episode: "Latanya"
2005	All That 10th Anniversary Reunion Special	Himself	Television special
2006	Campus Ladies	Mark	Episode: "The Blind Leading the Blonde"
2007–2012	Grey's Anatomy	Dr. Steve Mostow	37 episodes Also production staff on 7 episodes (2007–2008)
2007	The Winner	Clerk	Episode: "Pilot"
2009–2010	Seattle Grace: On Call	Dr. Steve Mostow	6 episodes Web series
2010	NCIS: Los Angeles	Ethan	Episode: "Hunted"
2011	Rules of Engagement	Barry	2 episodes
2011	Parks and Recreation	Ted	Episode: "Soulmates"
2011	Desperate Housewives	Kevin	Episode: "Making the Connection"
2012	Bones	Chad Fergus	Episode: "The Bump in the Road"
2013	Body of Proof	Bodie Batts	Episode: "Daddy Issues"
2014	The Mentalist	Sergei Sokolov	Episode: "The Golden Hammer"
2014	Franklin & Bash	A.D.A. Darcell	Episode: "Good Cop/Bad Cop"
2014	Parenthood	Doctor	Episode: "Vegas"
2014–2015	Mom	Cooper	2 episodes
2015	Comedy Bang! Bang!	Egghead Writer	Episode: "Karen Gillan Wears A Black and White Striped Pullover and Coral Skirt"
2015	Lab Rats	Dr. Ryan	Episode: "Space Elevator"
2015	Agent X	Jerold Harrow	2 episodes
2016	Maron	Glenn	Episode: "Shrink and Kink"
2016	This Isn't Working	Dr. Sheldon	Episode: "Virgin-Margaritaville"
2016–2017	The Great Indoors	Zeb	4 episodes
2017	Grace and Frankie	Tim	Episode: "The Incubator"
2020	Modern Family	Martel	Episode: "The Prescott"
