= Lori Beth Denberg =

American actress and comedian (born 1976)

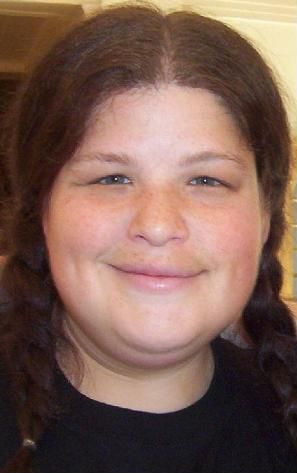
- Denberg in 2006
- Born: February 2, 1976 (age 50); Los Angeles, California, U.S.
- Occupations: Actress; comedian
- Years active: 1994–present

Lori Beth Denberg (born February 2, 1976) is an American actress and comedian. She is best known for her work as an original cast member of the Nickelodeon sketch comedy series All That and for her role as Lydia Liza Gutman on The WB sitcom The Steve Harvey Show.

== Early life ==
Denberg was born February 2, 1976, in Northridge, a sub-section of Los Angeles, California. She was raised in a Jewish family.

== Career ==
She began her career appearing on Nickelodeon's sketch comedy series All That (from 1994 to 1998), after graduating from high school. At 18, she was the oldest cast member. In 1997, she appeared in the film Good Burger with fellow All That castmates Josh Server, Kenan Thompson, and Kel Mitchell. She appeared in the first three seasons of the Nickelodeon game show Figure It Out as a regular panelist (from 1997 to 1998). In April 1998, Denberg was promoted as a special guest for a Nickelodeon showcase at the third Big Stinkin' International Improv & Sketch Comedy Festival in Austin. She then appeared on The WB's The Steve Harvey Show (from 1998 to 2002).

She had a minor role in the film Dodgeball: A True Underdog Story in 2004, playing cheerleader Martha Johnstone. Denberg reunited with her All That cast members for the 2011 Comikaze Expo. She joked at the expo that she was now "living out her old age." She made a brief cameo in a 2012 episode of Workaholics as herself.

In 2014, Denberg appeared as Goody Schmidt, a recently blinded widow, in the comedy television pilot Goody Goody, which was filmed in Pennsylvania and scheduled for a public screening at Civic Theatre in Allentown.

In February 2018, she joined fellow All That castmates for a semi-reunion on the MTV show Wild 'n Out, which aired the following month. She also appeared in an episode of Double Dare that pitted Thompson against Mitchell to assist in the demonstration of physical challenges.

In December 2018, Denberg appeared in "Discontinued", a special hosted by YouTube star Andre Meadows. The special looks at the rise and fall of the world's most famous discontinued foods, toys, customs, and businesses.

Denberg returned as a recurring guest star in the 2019 revival of All That, reprising her Loud Librarian role and "passing the torch" as the host of Vital Information to new cast member Reece Caddell. She also made a cameo appearance playing Uno in the independent film Ham on Rye in 2019.

She competed on the twenty-fourth season of Worst Cooks in America, the show's seventh celebrity edition titled That's So '90s, which aired in 2022.

In 2024, Denberg gave an interview to Business Insider in which she accused Dan Schneider, the creator of All That and several other Nickelodeon shows, of touching her inappropriately, showing her pornography, and attempting to initiate phone sex with her when she was 19. Denberg also accused Schneider of having her banned from the set of The Amanda Show in 1999 after she voiced concern for the well-being of the show's star, her friend and former All That costar Amanda Bynes. Schneider denied much of the allegations, calling them "wildly exaggerated".

== Personal life ==
She is an ordained minister.

== Filmography ==
=== Film ===
Year	Title	Role	Notes
1997	Good Burger	Connie Muldoon	
2004	Dodgeball: A True Underdog Story	Martha Johnstone	Credited as LB Denberg
2006	18 Fingers of Death!	Shirley House	
2019	Ham on Rye	Smoker playing Uno	
2019	Lost Treasure of the Valley	Molly	Short film; also served as executive producer
2023	Good Burger 2	Connie Muldoon	

=== Television ===
Year	Title	Role	Notes
1994–1998; 2019–2020	All That	Various roles	Main role (seasons 1–4); recurring (season 11)
1997–1998	Figure It Out	Herself/panelist	Season 1-3
1998–2002	The Steve Harvey Show	Lydia Liza Gutman	Recurring season 3, series regular seasons 4-6
1998	The Mystery Files of Shelby Woo	Trish	Episode: "The UFO Mystery"
2004	Malcolm in the Middle	Ronnie	Episode: "Dirty Magazine"
2012	Workaholics	Herself	Episode: "True Dromance"
2016	Double Dare Anniversary Special	Herself	Contestant in first game filmed at San Diego Comic-Con
2017	Hollywood Darlings	Herself	Episode: "She's Not All That"
2017	90's House	Herself	Episode: "The One With the Sitcom"
2018	Wild 'n Out	Herself	Episode: "All That Takeover"
2018	Double Dare	Herself	"Team Kel vs. Team Kenan" (Season 1, Episode 33)
2022	Worst Cooks in America	Herself	Contestant (season 24)
