= Josh Server =

American actor (born 1979)

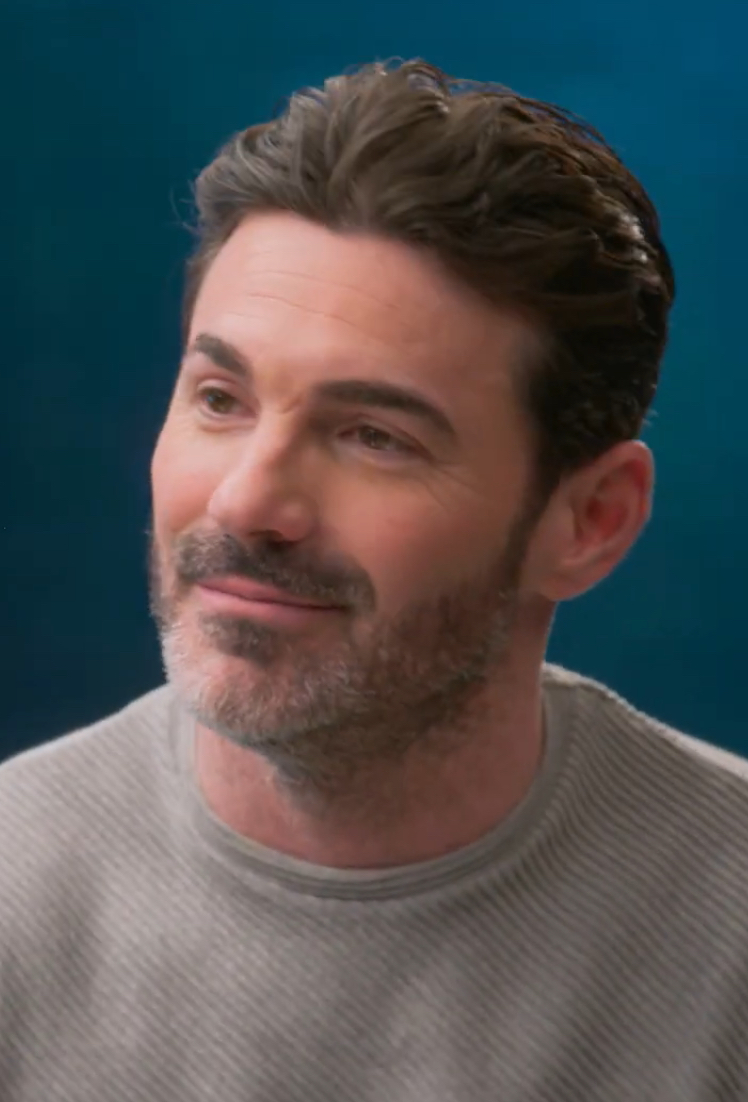
- Server in 2019
- Born: Joshua Aaron Server; April 11, 1979 (age 47); Highland Park, Illinois, U.S.
- Occupation: Actor
- Years active: 1994–present

Joshua Aaron Server (born April 11, 1979) is an American actor best known for being the only All That cast member to remain through all six original seasons.

== Acting career ==
Server began on All That at age 14 to tape the pilot for the show. His characters include Detective Dan, Earboy, Jimmy Bond Agent 1/7, and Bernie Kibbitz. In 1997, he and a few cast members starred in the 1997 feature film Good Burger (based on the All That sketch of the same name).

While he was on All That, Server made guest appearances on other Nickelodeon shows. He appeared in a Season 3 episode of The Secret World of Alex Mack in 1996. Starting in 1997, he and other All That alumni were panelists on the Nickelodeon game show, Figure It Out where he appeared until 1998. In 1999, he then appeared in the Season 3 finale of Kenan & Kel, and the pilot for The Amanda Show, along with All That fellow alumnus, Kenan Thompson.

=== After All That ===
After he and the last cast members of the original All That had left, Server moved on to host Oh Yeah! Cartoons for Season 3 in 2000–2001. Afterwards, he made another guest appearance in a Season 3 episode of 100 Deeds for Eddie McDowd in 2002.

Server returned to All That for its 10th-anniversary special which aired in 2005, reprising a few of his characters. In 2006, he made a guest appearance in a third-season episode of Drake & Josh.

In 2006, Server began starring in the web series Laugh Out Loud with Kenan Thompson. In early 2007, he appeared in a season 3 episode of Ned's Declassified School Survival Guide and an episode of Sam & Cat in 2014.

He's made several All That reunion-type appearances, such as 2015 New York Comic Con and a 2018 episode of Wild 'n Out, culminating in recurring in the 2019 revival of All That, along with Denberg, and Mitchell, starting with the season premiere.

== Personal life ==
Server was born in Highland Park, Illinois. He has a younger sister who was born in 1982. He is good friends with all of his castmates on All That, including Kenan Thompson and Kel Mitchell. He is also good friends with Nickelodeon series stars Drake Bell, Josh Peck, and Miranda Cosgrove. Server stated in the 1998 collector's guide, All That: Fresh out the Box, that his hobbies include going to the movies, rollerblading, the beach, and working out. Server is Jewish.

== Filmography ==
=== Television ===
Year	Title	Role	Notes
1994–2000, 2005, 2019–2020	All That	Himself, various	Series regular (seasons 1–6); recurring (season 11)
1996	The Secret World of Alex Mack	Louis Spivey	Episode: "Spivey"
1997–1998	Figure It Out	Himself	Panelist
1997	Sports Theater with Shaquille O'Neal	Griffin	Episode: "Broken Record"
1999	Kenan & Kel	Phillip	Episode: "Poem Sweet Poem"
1999	The Amanda Show	Himself	Episode 1
2000–2001	Oh Yeah! Cartoons	Host	Season 3
2002	Late Night with Conan O' Brien		1 episode
2002	100 Deeds for Eddie McDowd	Charlie	Episode: "Slap Shot"
2002	For Your Love	Arnold	Episode "The Blast from the Past"
2006	Drake & Josh	Jeff Carlson	Episode: "Theater Thug"
2007	Ned's Declassified School Survival Guide	Speedy Dot Delivery Guy	Episode: "Guide to Extra Credit"
2014	Sam & Cat	Agent Partridge	Episode: "#FirstClassProblems"
2016	Good Girls Revolt	Ralph	Recurring role
2018	Wild 'N Out	Himself	Episode: "All That Takeover"
2018	Double Dare	Himself	Contestant
2019	Game Shakers	Mr. McConnor	Episode: "Hot Bananas"
2020	Await The Dawn		
2022	Warped!	Chet Donovan	Episode: "Space-Conflicted!"
2025	Criminal Minds	Delaware State Trooper Chakoian	Episode: "Swimmer's Calculus"
2025	The Neighborhood	Dan	Episode: "Welcome to the e-Neighborhood"
2025	Bel-Air	Mr. Calloway	Episode: "The Maybes"

=== Film ===
Year	Title	Role	Notes
1997	Good Burger	Fizz	
2023	Good Burger 2	Fizz	

=== Other ===
Year	Title	Role	Notes
2006–2007	Laugh Out Loud	himself	main, web series

== Awards and nominations ==
- 1997 Kids' Choice Awards
  - Nominated: All That (Favorite TV Show)
- 1999 Kids' Choice Awards
  - Won: All That (Favorite TV Show)
- 2000 Kids' Choice Awards
  - Won: All That (Favorite TV Show)
