= For Real discography =

- Studio albums: 2
- Singles: 7
- Music videos: 7

This is the discography of the American band For Real.

== Albums ==
=== Studio albums ===
Year	Album	Chart positions			Album sales
Year	Album	U.S.	R&B	Top Heatseekers	Album sales
1994	It's a Natural Thang	-	80	-	
1996	Free	-	100	-	

== Singles ==
Year	Single	Peak positions				
Year	Single	Billboard Hot 100	Hot R&B/Hip-Hop Singles & Tracks	Hot Dance Music/Maxi-Singles Sales	Hot Dance Music Club Play	UK Top 75
1994	"You Don't Wanna Miss"	101	28	-	32	-
1994	"Easy to Love"	-	65	-	-	-
1994	"You Don't Know Nothin'"	88	80	-	-	54
1995	"Freedom"	45	18	-	-	-
1996	"Like I Do"	72	48	10	30	45
1997	"The Saddest Song I Ever Heard"	-	65	-	-	-
1997	"Hold Me"	-	-	-	-	-
"—" denotes a release that did not chart.
