= List of All That cast members =

The following is a list of all the All That cast members and performers. The show ran from 1994–2005 originally and returned in 2019, with three series runs total. The first run ran for six seasons, from 1994 to 2000. However, the show was put on a hiatus for a TV season after the sixth season. While the show was on a break, Nickelodeon aired a "Best Of" season to fill in time, featuring the Season 4 cast. A year later, the show was relaunched for a second run and ran for four seasons, from 2002 to 2005. Thirteen years later, the show was revived again, from 2019 to 2020.

== List of cast members ==
Performer	Years active	Repertory player	Featured player	Vital Information anchor	Hosted
Ryan Alessi	2019–2020	✓			
Angelique Bates	1994–1996	✓			
Aria Brooks	2020		✓		
Chelsea Brummet	2002–2005	✓			
Amanda Bynes	1996–2000	✓			✓
Reece Caddell	2019–2020	✓		✓	
Nick Cannon	1998–2000	✓	✓		✓
Ryan Coleman	2004–2005	✓			
Lori Beth Denberg	1994–1998	✓		✓	
Jack DeSena	2002–2005	✓			
Tricia Dickson	1997		✓		
Lisa Foiles	2002–2005	✓			
Leon Frierson	1997–2000	✓			
Kate Godfrey	2019–2020	✓			
Gabrielle Nevaeh Green	2019–2020	✓			
Bryan Hearne	2002–2003	✓			
Gabriel Iglesias	2000	✓			
Nathan Janak	2019–2020	✓			
Katrina Johnson	1994–1997	✓			
Christina Kirkman	2003–2005	✓			
Christy Knowings	1997–2000	✓			
Lex Lumpkin	2019–2020	✓			
Shane Lyons	2002–2004	✓			
Kel Mitchell	1994–1999	✓			
Alisa Reyes	1994–1997	✓			
Giovonnie Samuels	2002–2004	✓			
Mark Saul	1998–2000	✓	✓		
Chinguun Sergelen	2019–2020	✓			
Josh Server	1994–2000	✓			
Jamie Lynn Spears	2002–2004	✓			
Kyle Sullivan	2002–2005	✓			
Danny Tamberelli	1997–2000	✓		✓	
Kenan Thompson	1994–1999	✓			✓
Kianna Underwood	2005	✓			
Denzel Whitaker	2005	✓			

== Cast timeline ==
Performer	Seasons										
Performer	1	2	3	4	5	6	7	8	9	10	11
Angelique Bates	Main	Main			Guest					Guest	
Lori Beth Denberg	Main	Main	Main	Main	Guest						Guest
Katrina Johnson	Main	Main	Main		Guest					Guest	
Kel Mitchell	Main	Main	Main	Main	Main					Guest	Guest
Alisa Reyes	Main	Main	Main	Guest	Guest					Guest	Guest
Josh Server	Main	Main	Main	Main	Main	Main				Guest	Guest
Kenan Thompson	Main	Main	Main	Main	Main		Guest			Guest	Guest
Amanda Bynes			Main	Main	Main	Main	Guest	Guest			
Tricia Dickson			Featured	Guest							
Leon Frierson				Main	Main	Main				Guest	
Christy Knowings				Main	Main	Main				Guest	
Danny Tamberelli				Main	Main	Main				Guest	
Zach McLemore				Featured							
Victor Cohn-Lopez				Featured							
Nick Cannon					Featured	Main		Guest	Guest	Guest	
Mark Saul					Featured	Main				Guest	Guest
Gabriel Iglesias						Main					
Chelsea Brummet							Main	Main	Main	Main	
Jack DeSena							Main	Main	Main	Main	
Lisa Foiles							Main	Main	Main	Main	Guest
Bryan Hearne							Main	Main			
Shane Lyons							Main	Main	Main		
Giovonnie Samuels							Main	Main	Main		
Kyle Sullivan							Main	Main	Main	Main	
Jamie Lynn Spears								Main	Main	Guest	Guest
Ryan Coleman									Main	Main	
Christina Kirkman									Main	Main	
Kianna Underwood										Main	
Denzel Whitaker										Main	
Lil' JJ										Featured	
Ryan Alessi											Main
Reece Caddell											Main
Kate Godfrey											Main
Gabrielle Nevaeh Green											Main
Nathan Janak											Main
Lex Lumpkin											Main
Chinguun Sergelen											Main
Aria Brooks											Featured
