= All That season 10 =

All That
- Season 10
- Starring: Chelsea Brummet; Ryan Coleman; Jack DeSena; Lisa Foiles; Christina Kirkman; Kyle Sullivan; Kianna Underwood; Denzel Whitaker
- No. of episodes: 13

Release
- Original network: Nickelodeon, TEENick
- Original release: April 23 – October 22, 2005

Season chronology
- ← Previous; Season 9 Next → Season 11

The tenth season of All That aired throughout the spring and fall of 2005, being the fourth and final season of the first relaunch era. The season aired 13 episodes, beginning with a special to celebrate the tenth anniversary of the series. Approximately 6.2 million total viewers watched the special on both its April 23 and April 24 airings, making it the top cable or broadcast program for the 2–11, 6–11, and 9-14 age demographics.

The cast members are made changes this season:

- Lisa’s hair is blonde, although that changed to red later after.
- Jack’s hair is a bigger afro
- Kyle doesn’t wear glasses.
- All of the cast members are grown up.

The intro was similar to Seasons 4 and 5, featuring the cast on a red carpet as they come out of a limo and greet their fans.

The show saw many changes before the start of the season. Shane Lyons left the show after producers opted not to renew his contract, while Giovonnie Samuels left because she was getting too old for the cast, so she left to make room for new cast members. Jamie Lynn Spears got her own show on Nickelodeon and left the show. Producers hired Kianna Underwood and Denzel Whitaker to replace them.

After a five-year absence, the art of the featured player segment was brought back to the show, with Lil' JJ being brought on as the featured player. Akin to the last season, producers brought back Vital Information and got Lil' JJ to anchor the sketch. However, he would only appear for these two sketches and not take part in any other part of the show.

The show was cancelled in September 2005, and aired its final episode on October 22. Season 10 was the final season of the show for over a decade until it was announced in 2019 that the show would be coming back for an eleventh season.

== Cast ==
Repertory players

- Chelsea Brummet
- Ryan Coleman
- Jack DeSena
- Lisa Foiles
- Christina Kirkman
- Kyle Sullivan
- Kianna Underwood
- Denzel Whitaker

Featuring

- Lil' JJ (Note: Vital Information anchor)

== 10th anniversary special ==
The Nickelodeon's All That 10th Anniversary Reunion Special was a television special aired by Nickelodeon to celebrate the 10th anniversary of the sketch comedy series All That. The special was broadcast on April 23 and April 24, 2005, and featured the cast members of All That from both eras, and featuring the "auditions" of two new cast members, and new cast member Lil' JJ's first Vital Information, although some cast members didn't attend. The special was also watched by 6.2 million viewers.

The Reunion Special was a one-hour event hosted by Frankie Muniz on April 23. Ashanti and Bow Wow were the musical guests. The special had many guest stars and crossover sketches with characters from Seasons 1–6 to Seasons 7–9. Characters from the original era include Principle Pimpell, Coach Kreeton, Detective Dan, Fat Cop, and Good Burger. From the relaunch include Sugar and Coffee, Randy Quench, and Trash 'n Fashion. Bow Wow sings the All That theme song featuring Lisa Foiles, Chelsea Brummet, and Kianna Underwood, which becomes the final segment during the Reunion.

The last segment of the special paid tribute to the ending soundclip of the original seasons. As the room for the anniversary party was empty, Kenan and Kel stood sleeping in the costumes of their roles as Mavis and Clavis. Kenan woke up and says "Hey, Clavis!, wake up, the show's over," and Kel responds with his signature, "Oh yeah, kick it". They then turn and slowly walk away as the screen fades to black in a dramatic yet subtle ending to the 10 year tribute.

Chronologically, the anniversary special and season 10 of All That were filmed in from October 2004 to February 2005, then Nickelodeon came to air them the following year. After the anniversary ended, season 10 began airing a week later, on April 30, 2005.

=== Cast ===
- Angelique Bates
- Chelsea Brummet
- Nick Cannon (was via satellite)
- Ryan Coleman
- Jack DeSena
- Lisa Foiles
- Leon Frierson
- Giovonnie Samuels
- Lil' JJ
- Christina Kirkman
- Christy Knowings
- Kel Mitchell
- Alisa Reyes
- Mark Saul
- Josh Server
- Jamie Lynn Spears
- Kyle Sullivan
- Danny Tamberelli
- Kenan Thompson
- Kianna Underwood
- Denzel Whitaker

== Episodes ==
No. overall	No. in season	Title	Original release date	Prod. code	K9−14 viewers (in millions)
163	1	"Mario"	April 30, 2005	1001	1.22
Green Room - Action Figures: Kyle brings in a big box filled with All That action figures that say quotes the cast members have never said. It is eventually revealed to the audience, but not to the cast members, that the action figures are the work of the "Know Your Stars" announcer.; Zortogs; Vital Information; Randy Quench Volunteer Fireman: Barbeque; A Poem By Claudia; Know Your Stars - The announcer gleefully annoys Denzel Whitaker by purposely mispronouncing his name as "Denzel Vinegar", "Darnell Spit-Licker", "Doorknob Fiffiffer", and "Doombar Fig-Popper".; Vital Information introduces "Mario"; Musical Guest: Mario performs Let Me Love You; Kianna Underwood & Denzel Whitaker's first episode as cast members and Lil' JJ's first episode as a Vital Information anchor.
164	2	"Fantasia Barrino"	May 7, 2005	1002	N/A
Green Room - Jack's Stunt Double: Jack has hired a stunt double, but he goes off duty when confronted by a big biker. Jack must try to fight the biker... Either that or Kyle's mother will take care of it.; L.A.M.O.S.: The so-called "League of Amazing Magnificent Outstanding Superheroes", who consist of: •Dr. Laser (Kyle), a dermatologist who can shoot lasers (only for pointing purposes) from his fingers •The Barber (Denzel), who can alter the styles and colors of people's hair by waving his hands •The Sprinkler (Ryan), whose right hand performs the same function as his namesake gardening device •Mega Butt (Chelsea), who can inflate her buttocks and hit people with them •Old Man, who is "very, very old" •The Toddler, "a 2-year-old who toddles": Vital Information w/ Lil' JJ; Jim Tasty; Know Your Stars - The announcer purposely stalls in doing the skit, making Kianna Underwood decide to mention her own facts about herself. When the announcer finally speaks, he teases and annoys Kianna by making claims that she loves to talk about herself and always gets upset when people aren't talking about her.; Kianna is supposed to introduce the musical guest, but she’s too busy listening to her Fantasia CD, so Jack, Christina, and Ryan introduce "Fantasia"; Fantasia ("Truth Is")
165	3	"Jesse McCartney"	May 14, 2005	1003	N/A
Green Room - Dance-Off: In order to see who wins grape soda, Denzel and Kianna have a dance-off and Ryan and Kianna later dance at a speeding pace and they explode. Denzel then gets the soda.; The Filthy Chef (Kyle); Vital Information; Arts & Crafts with Percy and Poncy (Jack and Christina): A birdhouse; The Rougenecks; Know Your Stars - The announcer accuses Chelsea Brummett of having an orange duck in her pants, a claim Chelsea attempts to prove wrong, only to find that there actually is an orange duck in her pants.; The Filthy Chef introduces "Jessie McCartney"; Musical Guest: Jesse McCartney ("Beautiful Soul")
166	4	"JoJo"	June 4, 2005	1004	1.08
Green Room: Denzel's Blood Test; Sugar & Coffee in the Chemistry Class; A Poem by Claudia; Arts and Crafts with Percy and Poncy: Knitting; Vital Information; Kareena Jones (Kianna); Know Your Stars - The announcer talks about Christina Kirkman's several scars on her body, but then claims that Christina has a scar on her head from when she got hit by a big rock, a "fact" the announcer actually tries to make true by gleefully throwing several rocks at Christina.; 2Gether 4Ever introduces "JoJo"; Musical Guest: JoJo (Baby It’s You)
167	5	"Tyler Hilton"	June 11, 2005	1005	0.93
Green Room - Lisa’s Defective Clone; Zortogs; Vital Information; Escaped criminal Roxy McDougal in Ms. Bubell's class; Know Your Stars - The announcer successfully performs a hypnotism trick on Kyle Sullivan, and forces him to perform a series of wacky and embarrassing actions.; The Rougenecks introduce "Tyler Hilton"; Musical Guest: Tyler Hilton
168	6	"Bow Wow"	June 12, 2005 (Australia)	1007	N/A
Green Room - Truth or Bear?; The L.A.M.O.S.: Fashion Show; Vital Information; A Poem by Claudia; The Rougenecks; Know Your Stars - The announcer tricks Kianna Underwood into revealing her favorite hamburger toppings by claiming her favorite topping is baby snot, and acts as a fast food owner, asking her to pay for the "hamburger meal" she "ordered". When Kianna refuses, the announcer causes her to be arrested by a cop for attempting to "steal" the "hamburger meal".; Denzel, Kianna, and Christina introduce "Bow Bow"; Musical Guest: Bow Wow
169	7	"Drake Bell"	June 18, 2005	1006	N/A
Green Room - Kyle's new elderly girlfriend: It seems that Kyle's new girlfriend, Maude, is old, so Jack talks to him and it was only so HE can have her.; 2Gether 4Ever; Vital Information; Kareena Jones Public Service Announcement: Stay in School; Jeff Bester (Denzel): Safety Tester; Know Your Stars - The announcer has brought his five-year-old son in for training to become a "Know Your Stars" announcer, but the son spends his training time by making fun of Ryan Coleman, calling him icky and dumb, much to the announcer's gleeful approval, and to Ryan's annoyance.; Kareena Jones introduces "Drake Bell"; Musical Guest: Drake Bell ("Circles")
170	8	"Morgan Smith"	October 1, 2005	1009	N/A
Green Room: All That Yard Sale Denzel Sells everyone for a dollar; The Filthy Chef: Fried Chicken w/ Macaroni and Cheese; Kareena Jones Public Service Announcement: Recycle; Vital Information; 2Gether 4Ever featuring Chelsea and Kyle; Know Your Stars - The announcer attempts to perform "Know Your Stars" with Ryan Coleman, but is continually distracted by a party he is apparently holding with the other cast members, a party which Ryan apparently wasn't invited to. Kyle Sullivan soon comes in, and Ryan asks him about the party, but Kyle reveals there isn't a party, and the announcer reveals it was all a trick to annoy Ryan further. After an angry Ryan storms off, Kyle sits on the "Know Your Stars" chair, only for the announcer to simply tell Kyle to get out.; Zortogs introduce "Morgan Smith"; Musical Guest: Morgan Smith
171	9	"Brooke Valentine"	October 8, 2005	1010	N/A
Green Room - Christina loses her arm; A Poem by Claudia; Vital Information; Kareena Jones; Know Your Stars - The announcer makes the claim that Jack DeSena is a very tough guy. As the two of them debate over the claim, a large thug comes into the set, and the announcer claims to him that Jack thinks he can beat the thug up. The thug becomes enraged at that claim and viciously beats Jack up, much to the announcer's glee.; Musical Guest: Brooke Valentine
172	10	"American Hi-Fi"	October 15, 2005	1011	0.98
Green Room: Kyle & The Chicken; The Filthy Chef: Clam Chowder; A Poem by Claudia; Vital Information; The Rougenecks; Jeff Bester: Safety Tester; Know Your Stars - The announcer challenges Lisa Foiles to sing, and Lisa does by singing the All That theme song, but the announcer purposely throws Lisa off her singing by making wacky noises, and then mocks Lisa for not being a great singer, much to her annoyance.; Percy and Poncy introduce "American Hi-Fi"; Musical Guest: American Hi-Fi
173	11	"Brie Larson"	October 16, 2005 (Australia)	1012	N/A
Green Room - The cast is beaten by bullies.; Vital Information w/ Lil' JJ; Know Your Stars: Denzel Whitaker; Musical Guest: Brie Larson
174	12	"Lalaine"	October 22, 2005	1013	N/A
Green Room - All That President Election: Kyle wants the rest of the cast to vote for him, while they want to vote for Chelsea's cat. In the end: clowns appear and beat up Kyle because their show was canceled due to the show's huge popularity.; Randy Quench - Awards Ceremony with host Rex Firestone (Ryan); Vital Information w/ Lil' JJ; Trapped in an Elevator - Abby Rhodes, Percy Flavin, Claudia, and Claude Grimes are trapped inside an elevator.; Know Your Stars: Christina Kirkman; Christina is supposed to introduce Lalaine, who is the musical guest, but Denzel does this after he gives Christina a sandwich with too much pepper.; Musical Guest: Lalaine ("I'm Not Your Girl"); (Final episode of the show's second run) (Also final episode to feature Chelsea Brummett, Jack DeSena, Lisa Foiles, Kyle Sullivan, Christina Kirkman, Ryan Coleman, Kiana Underwood, Denzel Whitaker, and Lil' JJ)
175	13	"Avril Lavigne"	October 29, 2005 (Australia)	1008	N/A

=== Special ===
Title	Original release date	Prod. code	U.S. viewers (millions)
"Nickelodeon's All That 10th Year Anniversary Reunion Special"	April 23, 2005	998	3.3
Stage Room/Backstage – The current cast introduces host Frankie Muniz, but he is held up by Thelma Stump (Jamie Lynn Spears). After he gets her some bacon, he comes and hosts.: Good Burger: Ed (Kel Mitchell), is celebrating Good Burger's 10th anniversary by wreaking havoc on Lester Oaks, Construction Worker (Kenan Thompson), Bernie and Bernice Kibbitz (Josh Server and Christina Kirkman), Venice Hyatt (Lisa Foiles), who is a parody of Paris Hilton, and other Good Burger workers and customers. When fireworks are delivered to the restaurant, Ed places them on the grill, which causes them to set off and cause chaos in Good Burger.; Mavis & Clavis: They want a date with Chelsea and start fighting over her. While they're busy fighting, Chelsea leaves, and an old woman takes her place. When Mavis and Clavis realize the old woman's presence, they run away, frightened.; Frankie, Kenan, and Kel reminisce on their years on All That and show a montage of clips of their hilarious sketches.; Green Room: Past and present cast members, and other Nickelodeon stars from Zoey 101 and Drake & Josh enjoy the 10th anniversary party until Carlee (Jamie Lynn Spears) and Marlee (Lisa Foiles) comment badly on almost everyone's clothes. Well, almost everybody.; Bloopers from Pierre Escargot, Amanda's first sketch, Tilt-a-Hurl w/ Aaron Carter, Brittney, Sugar & Coffee, Bridgett's Slumber Party, Sunshine Sally, and 2-Gether-4-Ever.; Josh introduces musical guest: Jack and Christina hang out with Josh as Jack is about to introduce musical guest. Jack offers Josh to introduce but he turns it down. But, Josh pushes Jack off, and tells everyone to give a round-o-sound for Ashanti!; Musical guest: Ashanti ("Only U"). After Ashanti's done, she wishes All That a happy 10th anniversary.; Happy 10th Anniversary: Television personalities and music artists such as Randy Jackson, Simon Cowell, Paula Abdul, Jesse McCartney, Simple Plan, and Raven-Symoné wish All That a happy 10th anniversary.; Frankie interviews Josh and Danny on their auditions to get on All That.; New Cast Auditions: Auditions are being held backstage. Kianna Underwood knocks Kyle out and becomes a new cast member.; Coach Kreeton (Kel Mitchell) and Abigail "Abby" Rhodes (Chelsea Brummet) are dating and plans to propose to her one night. However, just before he can propose, Principal William Baines Pimpell (Kenan Thompson) comes in and wants Kreeton to return to his teaching position at Dullmont Jr. High, which he blatantly refuses to do. Kreeton then tries to explain to Principal Pimpell the situations of his proposal, but before he can finish, a burglar steals the ring. Kreeton then calls the police, and an officer immediately responds: Jack Campbell, Fat Cop (Danny Tamberelli). At this point, Kreeton sends Abby away to get some coffee and sugar so that she doesn't find out about Kreeton's proposal. As usual, Campbell is only interested in searching the house's refrigerator, and when he doesn't find the ring there, he darts upstairs to check the refrigerator there. When Kreeton shouts that "What we need is a detective!", Detective Dan (Josh Server) comes flying through the window. Like normal, Dan immediately concludes that the victim, in this case Coach Kreeton, is the perpetrator of the crime, and promptly electrocutes him with a Taser, though Kreeton is once again quickly back on his feet. Abby now returns with the items he asked for earlier: "Sugar & Coffee"'s Buzz (Kyle Sullivan) and Kaffy (Lisa Foiles). Summoning arms from above the stage, the two douse Kreeton with coffee and sugar. When Kreeton complains that his tongue is on fire, Randy Quench (Jack DeSena) chops through the wall, and proceeds to chase everyone out of the house by blasting them with water.; More cast auditions: This time Denzel Whitaker knocks Kyle out and becomes the 2nd new cast member of All That's 10th season.; Nick Cannon comes to the All That stage live via satellite and wishes All That a Happy 10th Anniversary. He also talks to Kenan and the season 10 cast, giving Kianna and Denzel advice on being a cast member of All That. The cast had a hard time connecting to Nick and the microphone breaks. Repairman (Kel Mitchell) then drops from the ceiling to "fix" the microphone, but in typical Repairman manner, uses it to knock out Kyle. Lisa then calls security. Repairman then ends up destroying the plasma TV, and the security guards come and drag Repairman away.; Kyle, Josh, and Danny introduce a live semi-educational moment. Everyday French with Pierre Escargot (Kenan Thompson).; All That Classic Clip: Ask Ashley (Amanda Bynes) The girl who doesn't know how to turn her peanut butter and jelly sandwich over.; Best All That Scene Ever: The Unreal World! Gabe (Kyle Sullivan) refuses to share his hot tub with anybody. But Pharrah (Giovonnie Samuels) summons Zoey (Jamie Lynn Spears) out from underwater in the hot tub. She loses her foot. Frankie (Shane Lyons) has to pee. So he decides to do it in the hot tub. Gabe finally realizes that he should share his hot tub and jumps out of it at the last second.; All That returns Vital Information back to the show.; Vital Information For Your Everyday Life with Lil' JJ. After that, he wishes All That a Happy 10th Anniversary and will see everybody on All That.; Jack, Ryan, Christina, and Kyle give the audience a round-o-sound for Bow Wow.; Musical Guest: Bow Wow ("All That Theme Song" featuring Chelsea, Lisa, and Kianna); Final Remarks: Everybody wishes All That a Happy 10th Anniversary altogether from the bottom of their hearts and for watching All That for the past 10 years. Every cast member of All That from the past and present come onto the stage surrounding Bow Wow.; After the Closing Credits: After the special is over, Mavis (Kenan Thompson) and Clavis (Kel Mitchell) stand sleeping on the stage. Mavis wakes up and, in an homage to the ending sound clip from seasons 1-5 as well as their signature catchphrase, Mavis says "Hey Clavis! Wake up, the show is over," and Clavis responds with "Oh yeah, kick it!" They both leave, ending the special.
