= All That season 7 =

All That
- Season 7
- Starring: Chelsea Brummet; Jack DeSena; Lisa Foiles; Bryan Hearne; Shane Lyons; Giovonnie Samuels; Kyle Sullivan
- No. of episodes: 13

Release
- Original network: Nickelodeon (SNICK)
- Original release: January 19 – May 4, 2002

Season chronology
- ← Previous; Season 6 Next → Season 8

The first episode of the seventh season on All That featured special guests Frankie Muniz and Aaron Carter, premiering on January 19, 2002 and concluding on May 4, 2002, with 13 episodes aired, the fewest out of all the other seasons.

Many changes happened to the show before the start of this season. The entire cast of the previous season left the show. Nickelodeon replaced them with new cast members, who would bring in fresh material. The new cast included Chelsea Brummet, Jack DeSena, Lisa Foiles, Bryan Hearne, Shane Lyons, Giovonnie Samuels, and Kyle Sullivan. Of the seven cast members, Brummet, DeSena, Foiles, and Sullivan would remain on the show for the entire reboot period from 2002 to 2005, similar to original cast member Josh Server remaining present for the entire original period from 1994 to 2000.

Other changes occurred before the start of the season as well. Several sketches from the original run were removed, including Vital Information, which had been featured in every show since the second episode of the first season, but resumed in season 10 with Lil' JJ as host. It was replaced with a new sketch called Know Your Stars, which was featured in almost every episode of this season and onward. Also, in this season, instead of having the traditional green room, where the cast would hang out, the cast would be featured walking around the studio instead of being in one area. Another change was the absence of Kevin Kopelow, the stage manager who was usually hurt in some way. He was replaced with Pickle Boy (played by Brian Peck), a random person who would usually be seen offering people pickles.

In conjunction with the seventh season, All That brought in weekly special guest stars who helped open the show and participated in some of the sketches. Some included: Melissa Joan Hart, Frankie Muniz, Tony Hawk, David Arquette, Britney Spears, Aaron Carter, Will Friedle, Christina Vidal, Matthew Lillard, Ray Romano, Alexa Vega and Daryl Sabara (Spy Kids), Nick Carter, Justin Timberlake, Buddy Hackett, Barry Watson, Jennifer Love Hewitt, Tom Green, and former Guiding Light star Brittany Snow. Former cast members Kenan Thompson and Amanda Bynes also guest starred and reprised some of their characters. Also, during this season, there was supposed to be a scheduled performance by singer Aaliyah, but due to her death, she was replaced by a different musical artist.

The new cast also debuted with a new intro. Unlike the first six seasons, the audience wasn't featured in a camera shot before the intro. The intro did, however, include the "Oh" sign, as in previous seasons. The intro featured the cast dancing in front of a large lighted All That logo. They are all wearing white. Their names appear on the bottom of the screen and are in bright red lettering. After Sullivan is shown, the intro cuts to the cast dancing again before showing the special guest star and the musical guest. The intro ends with the cast walking into camera shot, while all the lights go off.

== Cast ==
Repertory players

- Chelsea Brummet
- Jack DeSena
- Lisa Foiles
- Bryan Hearne
- Shane Lyons
- Giovonnie Samuels
- Kyle Sullivan

== Episodes ==
No. overall	No. in season	Title	Original release date	Prod. code
120	1	"Frankie Muniz/Aaron Carter"	January 19, 2002	712
Green Room - The New Cast: It's time for the new season of All That to start...but no one has hired a cast! Frankie Muniz dashes into the street and pulls various kids from off the street to join the show: Lisa pulled over in a car, Jack sleeping in garbage, Bryan posing as a Girl Scout, Chelsea and Giovonnie jogging, Kyle in the men's bathroom, and Shane in the women's bathroom. Innately, they decline, but agree after being offered never having to go to school again, and all the pickles they can eat they agree.; Cherries, Worms and Mustard Comin' At Ya!; Sugar and Coffee: Buzz (Kyle) and Kaffy (Lisa) host their own talk show, where people eat and drink tons of sugar and coffee. On today's episode, Frankie Muniz guest stars and gets hooked on the sweets.; Brittney: Live from in the Toilet (Chelsea); Connect the Zits: A Person; Toy ER; Rate the Pain: Beehive; Know Your Stars: An announcer reveals three "facts" about an All That cast member or guest star as they sit down on a chair in the show's empty stage and listen. The three "facts" about Chelsea Brummet are that she's in the third grade, her favorite food is liver, and her nickname is Nakka-Nakka-Nakka-Nakka-Nakka-Poo.; Vocabulary with Lisa and her little friend Oswald: "Bacon" and "Nuts".; Bloopers: Kyle's thinking he was supposed to kiss Frankie Muniz in the Sugar and Coffee sketch. Lisa sneezes and covers Frankie with snot.; Chunky Blue Cheese, Cat Litter and Raw Bacon Comin' At Ya!; Crazy Taxi Driver (Bryan) introduces "Aaron Carter"; Musical Guest: Aaron Carter ("Not Too Young, Not Too Old"); Guest Star: Frankie Muniz; (First episode of the second run) (Also first episode to feature Chelsea Brummet, Jack DeSena, Lisa Foiles, Bryan Hearne, Shane Lyons, Giovonnie Samuels and Kyle Sullivan)
121	2	"Melissa Joan Hart/Usher"	January 26, 2002	713
Green Room - Melissa or Sabrina?: Kyle meets Melissa Joan Hart and asks her to perform magic, like Sabrina, the Teenage Witch. Melissa tries to explain that she has no magic powers. Kyle is disappointed, but asks for a kiss instead. Melissa agrees...after she uses her powers to turn Kyle into a male model!; Raw Oysters, Dandruff and Cole Slaw Comin' At Ya!; The Crazy Taxi Driver; The Difference Between Girls and Guys: Burping; Harry Bladder and the Chafed Professor: Professor Chafes tells the students to create a magic lotion to cure his chafed thighs. Once he leaves, Sacko (Shane) attempts to throw a magic lotion on Harry (Kyle), which misses, hitting Herhiney (Lisa), enlarging her rear end. Harry tries a counter lotion, which gives Sacko large breasts. Sacko again tries to hit Harry with a lotion, he ducks and it hits Reron (Bryan), enlarging his hair. Harry's next lotion misses Sacko and hits Chafes just as he walks in. It cures his chafed thighs, but only temporarily as it turns him into a bra moments later, which Sacko takes.; Wake Up Scene: Giant Bunny; Know Your Stars: The three "facts" about Jack DeSena are that his first word was "macaroni", his bike still has training wheels, and he likes to collect diapers.; Bloopers: Bryan somehow gets pulled over by a cop. Jack finds a duck in his pants.; Dog Food, Tomatoes and Mucus Comin' At Ya!; Kyle Introduces "Usher"; Musical Guest: Usher ("I Don't Know"); Guest Star: Melissa Joan Hart
122	3	"P. Diddy"	February 2, 2002	714
Green Room - Wake Up Shane: Jack and Bryan need to wake up Shane before the show starts. While he's asleep, they can't get him up for the show. They go to guest star P. Diddy for help.; Tunafish, Nail Polish and Lima Beans Comin' At Ya!; Bridgett's Slumber Party: Bridgett (Chelsea), Gale (Giovonnie), and Claudia (Lisa) have a slumber party, but Elliot (Kyle) always ruins it. The girls talk about guys, sniff Bridgett's new scratch-and-sniff hot guy trading cards (which Claudia eats), play truth or dare, Gale dares Claudia to do a silly dance to a song (she throws the radio out of the window), Gale asks which boys Bridgett has kissed (everyone) and Bridgett asks Gale what's the worst thing she's ever done (stay up fifteen minutes past her bedtime to read a book), then Bridgett dares Gale to kiss a hot guy, which she has an abundance of in her closet.; Songs from the Dentist Chair; TR Yell w/ host Carson Daly (Jack): P. Diddy joins and introduces his new act, Lil' Fetus (Bryan), who raps from inside his mother's uterus.; Vocabulary with Lisa and her little friend Oswald: "Watermelon" and "Face"; Wake Up Scene: Giant P. Diddy; Know Your Stars: The three "facts" about Shane Lyons are that his favorite sport is girls' soccer, he loves to play with the lint from his own belly button, and he was arrested three times.; Kid at the Principal's Office: A kid (Kyle) won't stop laughing at the principal's office.; Fudge, ToothPaste and Eggs Comin' At Ya!; Brittney in the toilet introduces "P. Diddy"; Musical Guest: P. Diddy ("Diddy")
123	4	"Britney Spears"	February 9, 2002	717
Green Room - Video Phone: Lisa introduces the cast to the new technology of the Video Phone and they make several calls of randomly call people, even Britney Spears, who agrees to be a guest on the show.; Salsa, Mud and Hamster Tongues Comin' At Ya!; Bridgett's Slumber Party: The girls are telling each other ghost stories. Then they fight over the correct lyric to the Britney Spears song "Oops I Did It Again." Bridgett thinks it's "Oops, I Kissed Him Again.", Gale thinks it's "Oops You're My Best Friend", and Claudia insists it's "Oops I Just Ate Your Brain." To settle the argument, Claudia uses her powers to summon Britney Spears, who visits the girls and surprisingly tells them Claudia was right about the lyric. Elliot comes in that he gets excited and tries to get Bridgett in trouble for having Britney Spears in her room.; Rate the Pain: Porcupine; Oven Lovin' w/ Buford (Shane) and Percy (Jack); Wake Up Scene: Man Shaving; Know Your Stars: The three "facts" about Britney Spears are that she likes her peanut butter chunky, she's half-girl, half-robot, half-ravioli, and she hasn't brushed her teeth in six months.; Vocabulary with Lisa and her little friend Oswald: "Truck" and "Garbage"; Bloopers: Kyle gets so excited about meeting Britney Spears that he knocks over Giovonnie, Chelsea and Lisa and he jumps on top of her and they both fall out a window.; Buzz and Kaffy introduces "Britney Spears"; Musical Guest: Britney Spears ("I'm Not a Girl, Not Yet a Woman")
124	5	"Tony Hawk/Barenaked Ladies"	February 23, 2002	715
Green Room - Tony Hawk: Jack, Bryan, Chelsea, and Kyle meet Tony Hawk, and they want him to teach them and beg him to do some of his skateboard moves. Kyle falls and Chelsea takes him off set, saying "You poor baby, Chelsea's gonna make it all better." This causes a jealous Jack to break down crying in Tony Hawk's arms.; Olive Oil, Dirt and Eyeballs Comin' At Ya!; Sugar and Coffee; Catapult- Kyle, Bryan, and Lisa launch Shane on a catapult through Hollywood, into a pool.; Rate the Pain- Potato Masher; Chit Chat- Stacy Chit (Giovonnie) introduces guest Tony Hawk, but he wants to talk about knitting.; Wake Up Scene: Giant Belly; Know Your Stars: The three "facts" about Bryan Hearne are that he was born in Japan, loves to drink hamster juice, and likes to kiss himself in the mirror.; Bloopers: Tony Hawk gives Giovonnie a bunch of balloons and she floats into the air.; Chili, Hair and Yogurt Comin' At Ya!; Texas Girls introduce "Barenaked Ladies"; Musical Guest: Barenaked Ladies ("Falling for the First Time"); Guest Star: Tony Hawk
125	6	"David Arquette/Mandy Moore"	March 2, 2002	719
Green Room - Prank from David: David Arquette puts on a scream mask to try and scare the cast. Thinking he is a killer, the cast beat him up. Chelsea however, who was in on it, tells them that it's David. Just then David comes in on the elevator, arrives to the studio, causing the kids to conclude the other person really is a killer, and they beat him again, and he tells Chelsea that he want to do a prank first, on the cast, until he can no longer stand. They pull off the mask to reveal Jack underneath.; Raw Oysters, Dandruff and Cole Slaw Comin' At Ya!; Harry Bladder in "Foodius Fightium", Harry gets a delivery of trading cards, which Sacko tries to steal, eventually resulting in a food fight.; Connect the Zits: Abe Lincoln; The Crazy Taxi Driver; Rate the Pain: Drum; Know Your Stars: The three "facts" about Chelsea Brummet are that she likes country music, loves to play in garbage, and married a kangaroo.; Bloopers: Bryan and David are interrupted by Bryan's mom and takes over the wheel.; Britney in the toilet introduces "Mandy Moore"; Musical Guest: Mandy Moore ("Crush"); Guest Star: David Arquette
126	7	"Kenan Thompson/LFO"	March 9, 2002	722
Green Room - OG Cast Member: Former cast member Kenan Thompson visits the new cast, but no one but the garbage man seems to know who he is.; Melon Balls, Shampoo and Oatmeal Comin' At Ya! w' Kenan; Harry Bladder in "Lord Moldy Shorts", Principal Pimpell (Kenan) teaches Harry's class that his pimple turns out to be the head of Lord Moldyshorts.; Songs from the Dentist Chair; Sugar and Coffee: Miss Piddlin (Kenan) visits Buzz and Kaffy.; Know Your Stars: The three "facts" about Giovonnie Samuels are that her middle name is Loofa, she still needs help tying her shoes, and washes her hair with ketchup.; Soupdude & Superdude: Soupdude (Shane) and Superdude (Kenan) stop robbers.; Harry and friends introduce "LFO"; Musical Guest: LFO ("Every Other Time"); Guest Star: Kenan Thompson
127	8	"Barry Watson/Christina Millian"	March 16, 2002	723
Green Room - Trick or Treat: Kids come and get candy for Halloween, while the cast play stacked drumsticks. Soon, it's not Halloween but children keep trick or treating at the green room door. First two girls dressed as pirates, then two boys dressed as princess's and finally Barry Watson arrives, but Jack believes it's another kid. Instead of candy they make Bryan give them his watch and Kyle his cellphone.; Clam Chowder, Grape Jelly and Guacamole Comin' At Ya!; Chit-Chat: Senator Bill Paxton; Kyle plays the piano; The Difference Between Girls and Guys: Talking on the Phone; The Crazy Taxi Driver: Driver's boss (Barry Watson) gets in the cab.; Wake Up Scene: Guy Eating an Orange; Rate the Pain: A Electric Eel; Know Your Stars: The three "facts" about Lisa Foiles are that she loves to play hopscotch, thinks Abraham Lincoln was hot, and thinks the producers of All That are idiots.; Bloopers: Crazy Taxi Driver apparently calls a thug a name.; Vocabulary w/ Lisa and her little friend Oswald: "Beef" and "Friends". Oswald introduces "Christina Millain"; Musical Guest: Christina Millian ("AM to PM"); Guest Star: Barry Watson
128	9	"Ray Romano/Lisa Leslie/Willa Ford"	March 23, 2002	721
Green Room - Ray Romano: Kyle, Lisa, and Chelsea are excited to find out that Ray Romano is going to be on the show. Unfortunately he gets locked in a men's room, so Jack, Shane, and Giovonnie get Lisa Leslie who was in Jack's Chicken Pot Pie as an alternative.; Chili, Hair and Yogurt Comin' At Ya!; Bridgett's Slumber Party: Bridgett wants to turn a nerd named Andy (Jack) into a hottie, so she and Gale attempt to give him a makeover. Elliot comes in and says that he wants to be a hottie, too. Claudia makes him over into a goth like her, and he runs screaming from the room after looking in the mirror. At the end, Bridgett concludes that "Either you're a hottie, or you're nottie!"; Connect the Zits: Chicken Nugget; Toy ER: Lisa Leslie's son ate her puzzle piece and a girl's doll's nose is full of mucus.; Kyle and Lisa hear Ray who is still locked in the men's room, and Lisa uses a sledgehammer to get him out, but it fails to work before Chelsea arrives and says that they have a show to do.; Know Your Stars: The four "facts" about Pickle Boy (Brian Peck) are that he hates pickles, his pickles taste bad, he likes to hurt and tease pickles, and he's the best pickle boy in the world.; Kyle, Lisa, and Chelsea hear Ray inside the men's room, and he says he's the same as always before the manager arrives and announces that Willa Ford is about to perform.; Jack, Kyle, and Bryan introduce a cute monkey, and introduce the musical guest, "Willa Ford".; Musical Guest: Willa Ford ("Did Ya' Understand That"); Pickle Boy hears Ray inside the men's room saying he's hungry, so he gives him a pickle to eat.
129	10	"Amanda Bynes/City High"	April 6, 2002	724
Green Room - Amanda Please?: The cast is excited to meet Amanda Bynes, but Penelope Taynt: Amanda's number one fan (The Amanda Show), breaks in the greenroom to meet Amanda, so Nickelodeon agents hire Barney the Security Guard to capture her.; Fudge, ToothPaste and Eggs Comin' At Ya!; Sugar and Coffee: Amanda Bynes is introduced, and is asked for Sugar and Coffee, but before they could, they get interrupted by the Nickelodeon agents and Barney because of Penelope.; Connect the Zits: A Slice of Pizza; Shady Airlines: A couple wants to go to Hawaii, but gets scammed by the airline who merely use a fog machine outside the window of the plane, and then dress themselves and the airport to look like Hawaii. The couple is not convinced so they are locked in a dungeon labeled "complaints office."; Vocabulary w/ Lisa and her little friend Oswald: "Cardboard" & "Enjoy".; Know Your Guest Stars: The three "facts" about Amanda Bynes are that her favorite subject is math, she's just plain dumb, and keeps her underwear in the freezer.; Jack tries to hit on Amanda and Chelsea.; Amanda shows the cast a flashback of a late '90s Ask Ashley sketch where a robber appears.; Chit-Chat introduces "City High"; Musical Guest: City High ("Caramel"); Guest Star: Amanda Bynes; (This episode is a crossover between All That (OG and Relaunch) and The Amanda Show)
130	11	"Aaron Carter/Samantha Mumba"	April 13, 2002	718
Green Room - Realistic Video Games: Jack, Bryan and Chelsea vs Aaron Carter in realistic video games.; Raisins, Ointment and Egg Salad Comin' At Ya!; Tilt-A-Hurl: At an amusement park, a young boy named Ernie (Kyle) has his first day taking a job as a vendor for the park's biggest roller coaster, the Tilt-A-Hurl. The gravely-voiced owner guides him through the day, only for Ernie to learn that the coaster always makes the guests riding on it, who have recently ate a ton of food, vomit profusely whenever it reaches the loop-de-loop, while the vomit rains down on Ernie and the owner. Due to the owner enjoying getting puked on, Ernie is unable to avoid himself from getting puked on by the countless guests that come to ride on the Tilt-A-Hurl, including Aaron Carter.; Live from the Dumpster: Brittney; Vocabulary with Lisa and Her Little Friend Oswald: "Skunk" and "Gorilla"; Toy ER; Wake Up Scene: Foot Being Washed with Eggs; Know Your Stars: The three "facts" about Shane Lyons are that his favorite dessert is fish cream, he's a collector of old scabs, and his father is a chipmunk.; Bloopers: Chelsea punches Aaron Carter after thinking he's bothering Kyle.; Songs from the Dentist Chair: Jack introduces "Samantha Mumba"; Musical Guest: Samantha Mumba ("Don't Need You To (Tell Me I'm Pretty)"); Guest Star: Aaron Carter; (Aaron Carter's first time as a special guest instead of a musical guest.)
131	12	"Will Friedle/Nelly Furtado"	April 27, 2002	716
Green Room - Will Friedle: Dan Schneider calls the cast while they play fish throw, and tells them to bring Will Friedle an iced tea but, they thought he said to kick him in the knees. So, they each kick Will in his knees.; Ketchup, Cockroaches and Cottage Cheese Comin' at Ya!; Harry Bladder and the Magic Dance: Bogshwartz has a dance, but it isn't very fun. Harry proposes a dance contest, but is caught "magic dancing", which is against the rules. Sacko gets turned into an angry chimpanzee.; Kids vs. Adults w/ host (Chelsea).; Scuba News with Jack DeSena; Know Your Stars: The three "facts" about Lisa Foiles are that she was born in Nebraska, has furry feet, and her favorite dessert is squirrel pies.; Connect the Zits: The Letter F; Wake Up Scene: Giant Nelly Furtado; Jack, Chelsea, and Giovonnie introduce "Nelly Furtado"; Musical Guest: Nelly Furtado ("Turn off the Light"); Guest Star: Will Friedle
132	13	"Christina Vidal/Tyrese"	May 4, 2002	720
Green Room - Christina Helps: The cast meets Christina Vidal, and ask for her autograph and take pictures, she also helps everyone with their odd needs.; Cherries, Worms and Mustard Comin' At Ya!; Tilt-A-Hurl: On Ernie's second day at the job of serving as a vendor of the Tilt-A-Hurl, he wants to quit, but he is instead left in charge while the owner leaves, and thus, Ernie is forced to operate the Tilt-A-Hurl on his own as multiple guests continue to ride it, and vomit on a helpless Ernie during the ride. Ernie's family comes to visit, but ground him when they are puked on, and two girls fight over Ernie, one nice (Christina) and one abusive (Lisa), only to angrily dump him when they get puked on.; Songs from the Dentist Chair; Oven Lovin' w/ Burford and Percy; The Difference Between Girls and Guys: "Romantic Movies"; Know Your Stars: The three "facts" about Bryan Hearne are that he has a cat named Fudge-Face, likes to wear perfume, and once swallowed a lawnmower.; Bloopers: Sound Mic hits Christina's hair and lifts her up in the air during a Tilt-A-Hurl sketch; Lisa accidentally bites Christina's finger off.; Bryan, Lisa, and Kyle introduce "Tyrese"; Musical Guest: Tyrese ("I Like Them Girls"); Guest Star: Christina Vidal
