= All That season 9 =

All That
- Season 9
- Starring: Chelsea Brummet; Ryan Coleman; Jack DeSena; Lisa Foiles; Christina Kirkman; Shane Lyons; Giovonnie Samuels; Jamie Lynn Spears; Kyle Sullivan
- No. of episodes: 16

Release
- Original network: Nickelodeon, TEENick
- Original release: October 11, 2003 – February 21, 2004

Season chronology
- ← Previous; Season 8 Next → Season 10

During the off-season, Nickelodeon advertised and broadcast a competition called "R U All That?: Nickelodeon's Search for the Funniest Kid in America," a nationwide search to find the series a new cast member. The judges happened to be former cast members Amanda Bynes and Nick Cannon; Josh Peck was also a judge. After it ended in early 2003, said competition was broadcast on TV in a four-week special, with the finals airing on July 26, 2003. The contest picked five finalists, and all of them performed a sketch with some of the cast members. The winner was Christina Kirkman, who joined the show in the season opener and replaced Bryan Hearne. Ryan Coleman, the runner up in the contest, joined mid-season.

Ratings-wise, the show was not doing well. In order to raise ratings, the producers brought back old fan favorite sketches, like mous character Ed, as well as putting in Coleman in a test skit. They thought the fit would work, resulting in the revision of the skit.

This would be the final season for Shane Lyons, Giovonnie Samuels, and Jamie Lynn Spears. Shane Lyons revealed in episode 5 of Quiet on Set: The Dark Side of Kids TV that he was let go from the series after producers opted not to renew his contract. Giovonnie Samuels left because she felt was too old to be on All That, similar to original cast member Lori Beth Denberg exiting after Season 4. Jamie Lynn Spears left to star in her own Nickelodeon show Zoey 101, a show also created by Dan Schneider.

The cast of Season 9 continued to do On-Air Dares, akin to the last season. The intro was changed for this season, with the cast being set in the same place and are dancing in a dark room with the All That logo lit up in the back. The cast, however, is now wearing red, unlike the white that was used in Seasons 7 and 8. The "Oh" sign was brought back, and Brummet and Kirkman both held up the sign in the intro, similar to the previous two seasons. The intro was changed to accommodate Coleman's entry onto the show.

This is the first season since Season 3 to have more female cast members than male.

Following this season's conclusion, All That won Favorite TV Show at the 2004 Kids' Choice Awards for the first time in 4 years.

== Cast ==
Repertory players

- Chelsea Brummet
- Ryan Coleman (first episode: January 10, 2004)
- Jack DeSena
- Lisa Foiles
- Christina Kirkman
- Shane Lyons
- Giovonnie Samuels
- Jamie Lynn Spears
- Kyle Sullivan

== Episodes ==
No. overall	No. in season	Title	Original release date	Prod. code	Viewers (millions)
147	1	"Lillix"	October 11, 2003	938	N/A
Green Room - Christina Kirkman - The other cast members welcome Christina to the cast, but when the Know Your Stars guy makes fun of her (first saying she was voted the smelliest kid in America), Christina makes fun of him, claiming that the Know Your Stars guy has no friends and likes to drink pimple juice, and that his mother is in prison. Her "facts" impress the cast and even the Know Your Stars guy, who offers to work together with Christina to "insult the world", but Christina beats him up instead.; American Idiot; The Punchies; Tilt-A-Hurl: A new employee named Pat (Shane) is hired to operate the Tilt-A-Hurl, and Ernie eagerly shows him the ropes, believing he'll be the one that'll get puked on by the guests while he is safe. However, despite his eagerness and a few attempts, Ernie still ends up constantly getting puked on by the guests, while Pat always remains untouched, much to Ernie's frustration.; Christina, Shane, and Lisa introduce "Lillix"; Musical Guest: Lillix ("What I Like About You"); Christina Kirkman's first episode as a cast member.
148	2	"Nodesha"	October 18, 2003	939	N/A
Green Room - Jamie's Weather Machine: Jamie invents a machine that makes it rain down different objects.; Randy Quench Volunteer Fireman: Movie Theater; Vocabulary with Lisa: "Delight" and "Family"; Rowdy Fans: Jamie Spears; Ms. Fishtale's Driving School: Abby Rhodes; Know Your Stars: The announcer claims that Christina Kirkman is from Japan, that her favorite snack is dirt while also claiming that her lifelong dream is to know the taste of dirt, that she loves to pick her brother's nose (in reality, she's an only child), and that she has no money, while revealing that he actually stole Christina's purse, much to her anger.; Giovonnie, Shane, Jamie, and Kyle introduce "Nodesha"; Musical Guest: Nodesha ("Get It While It's Hot")
149	3	"Drake Bell/Nikki Cleary"	October 25, 2003	940	N/A
Green Room - The cast meets Kyle Rostensen, aka Totally Kyle (Drake Bell); American Idiot w/the Rougenecks in a parking lot; Advice From The Old Lady in Shane's Mouth; T R Yell: Lil' Embryo; Know Your Stars: The announcer attempts to insult Totally Kyle, but he agrees with every "fact" the announcer says, from having three heads to having his pants filled with spaghetti. The tables are quickly turned as Kyle unknowingly leaves the announcer being annoyed instead.; Buzz and Kaffy introduce "Nikki Cleary"; Musical Guest: Nikki Cleary ("1-2-3"); Guest Star: Drake Bell (as Totally Kyle)
150	4	"Third Eye Blind"	November 1, 2003	941	2.05 (Note: This figure represents the amount of viewers the episodes got with kids aged 2-11. This episode also received 1.14 million viewers with kids aged 9-14.)
Green Room - Horror Movie with a Surprise: The cast sits down to watch a movie until the monsters show up and touch the back of the girls' heads.; Thelma Stump: Christina Kirkman; The Unreal World; Know Your Stars: The announcer claims that Lisa Foiles is not as sweet as she looks and that she stole his wristwatch. When Lisa tries to deny that "fact", she discovers that she actually has the announcer's wristwatch, and despite Lisa saying the announcer set her up, the announcer declares that Lisa is about to be arrested, forcing her to flee as the police arrive.; Spella introduces "Third Eye Blind"; Musical Guests: Third Eye Blind ("Crystal Baller")
151	5	"Da Razkalz Cru"	November 15, 2003	942	N/A
Green Room - Who's The Real Jack?: Jack gets a guy to play him in the show, because Jack is going to get butt implants. But when Jack's surgery gets postponed, the fake Jack doesn't want to leave. Kyle knocks out the real Jack when he doesn't know Lisa's middle name (she actually doesn't have one) and they start the show with the conscious Jack (the fake Jack) with Chelsea, Kyle, Lisa, and Jamie.; Trashin Fashion at Porsha's (Chelsea) Sweet Sixteen Party; The Rougenecks: Education; 2Gether 4Ever; Know Your Stars - The announcer declares that Giovonnie Samuels loves cheese, is actually a 37-year-old man named Henry, and enjoys drinking out of toilets.; Trashin Fashion introduce "Da Razkalz Cru"; Musical Guests: Da Razkalz Cru ("I'm So Fly")
152	6	"Fefe Dobson"	November 22, 2003	943	N/A
Green Room - Fortune Machine: The cast finds a fortune machine that grants them three wishes.; Sugar and Coffee: Buzz's dad and Kaffy's mom show up with Dr. Floosh; Rowdy Fans in the audience; Ms. Fishtale's Driving School: Percy Flavin; Know Your Stars - Jamie Spears: The announcer declares that Jamie Spears is the president of Mexico despite her not ever being there, and makes fun of her for supposedly "loving" the announcer after she sarcastically calls him cute (after he mocks her with a Britney song).; The Old Lady In Shane's Mouth introduces "Fefe Dobson"; Musical Guest: Fefe Dobson ("Take Me Away")
153	7	"JC Chasez/Drake Bell"	January 10, 2004	945	N/A
Green Room - Jamie Builds Ryan: Jamie reassembles Ryan Coleman (who's formally introduced in this Green Room Scene) and so does the cast help her. After that, the cast welcomes Ryan to the show, and Jack receives one package filled with explosives from his dad.; American Idiot; Thelma Stump: Package Deliverer; Know Your Stars: The announcer claims that Ryan Coleman's favorite food is spaghetti and cornballs and that he has a huge crush on Jamie Spears. When Ryan tries to deny the latter fact, Jamie Spears comes in at that moment, and the announcer makes Ryan look bad by claiming that he said that she's dumb and smelly. Angered, Jamie storms off with the plate of cornballs that she'd made for him, confusing and annoying Ryan even more.; Jamie and Chelsea introduce a first look at Drake & Josh followed by Josh Peck introducing Drake Bell.; Musical Guest: Drake Bell ("I Found a Way"); Guest Star: JC Chasez; Ryan Coleman's first episode as a cast member.
154	8	"OK Go"	January 17, 2004	944	N/A
Green Room - Jack's Big Butt: Jack dreams about himself getting butt implants.; The Unreal World; The Rougenecks: Environment; Bridgett's Slumber Party - Switch Bodies: Gail and Claudia switch bodies.; Know Your Stars: The announcer claims that Shane Lyons loves to go roller skating every weekend, butters his pants before he gets dressed (which Shane admits he did so at one point due to being late for school), stuffs 17 oranges up his nose at one time, and secretly tattles on other kids at school.; Lil' Embryo introduces "OK Go"; Musical Guests: OK GO ("Don't Ask Me"); Absent: Ryan Coleman
155	9	"Britney Spears/Nick Cannon"	January 24, 2004	946	N/A
Green Room - Weird Camera: The cast finds this weird camera and whenever they take a picture of someone with the camera, it shows them something bad is about to happen to that person.; Sugar & Coffee: Wilma Jumpawitz/Ivanna Latte; Shane Vs. Things: The Audience; Britney Spears comes to Good Burger; Know Your Stars: The announcer successfully pushes Jack DeSena's buttons by referring to him as his only son or daughter, and treating him as such.; Jack, Jamie, Christina and Totally Kyle introduce "Nick Cannon". Special Guest: Drake Bell; Musical Guest: Nick Cannon ("My Mic"); Guest Star: Britney Spears; Note: This marks the first episode to feature the "Good Burger" sketch since Season 5.
156	10	"Brittany Snow/Wakefield"	January 31, 2004	947	0.91 (Note: With kids aged 9-14.)
Green Room - Ryan's Lucky Finger: Ryan loses his lucky finger, so Jack, Giovonnie, Shane and Christina help him find it when his bad luck starts to happen like getting hit with a golf putter and getting robbed until Chelsea found his lucky finger in the elevator and she accepts a bag filled of $1 million that she won.; The Unreal World; Mrs. Bloaf Grief Counselor: When a boy named Jerry (Kyle) learns that he has to repeat the seventh grade, his parents (Shane and guest star Brittany Snow) hire Mrs. Bloaf (Stephanie Matto from "R U All That"), a cynical grief counselor, to help make Jerry feel better about his situation, only for Mrs. Bloaf to cause more grief to Jerry to make him forget about his problem.; Know Your Stars: The announcer claims that Jamie Spears is the national spokesperson of asparagus, and then states other "facts" that are related to asparagus, much to Jamie's annoyance, as she dislikes asparagus.; While Shane and Ryan are fighting over who will introduce the musical guest, Brittany Snow introduces "Wakefield"; Musical Guest: Wakefield ("Say You Will"); Guest Star: Brittany Snow
157	11	"Boomkat"	February 7, 2004	948	N/A
Green Room - Jamie's Screaming Juice: The cast receives some peanut butter from a fan and eat it, getting the mouths stuck. They drink something to clear it up, but instead they drink Jamie's screaming juice.; American Idiot; The Rougenecks: Politics; 2Gether 4Ever; Know Your Stars - While giving out the usual style of "facts" to Chelsea Brummett, from her loving to go hiking in the middle of the night to her having a big booger, the announcer and Chelsea argue over the "fact" that she has no tongue.; Christina, Shane, and Lisa introduce "Boomkat"; Musical Guest: Boomkat ("What U Do 2 Me")
158	12	"Drake Bell/Nick Lachey"	February 14, 2004	949	N/A
Green Room - Better Go Catch It: The cast keeps getting prank phone calls from a guy who's telling them that their refrigerator is running, they don't believe it at first until the refrigerator comes to life and runs away.; Tilt-A-Hurl: As Ernie continues his job of operating the Tilt-A-Hurl, having grown used to being puked on by the guests riding the coaster, three Beauty Pageant Contestants get puked on despite Ernie's warnings, and Totally Kyle (Drake Bell) rides the coaster.; Thelma Stump: Ryan Coleman and Giovonnie Samuels; Sunshine Sally: A life-sized talking doll (Christina) drives a girl (Lisa) insane at her parents' (Chelsea and Jack) request.; Know Your Stars: After revealing one "fact" about Ryan Coleman that his friends call him Waffles, the announcer immediately switches to making a phone call ordering some food at a Chinese takeaway store (and charging the money to Ryan). Ryan tries to make the announcer stop talking to the phone and do "Know Your Stars", only for the announcer to brush him off. Upon finally finishing the call, the announcer immediately ends the segment, much to Ryan's annoyance.; Ryan, Chelsea, Jack, and Shane introduce "Nick Lachey"; Musical Guest: Nick Lachey ("This I Swear"); Guest Star: Drake Bell (as Totally Kyle)
159	13	"Drake Bell"	February 21, 2004	950	N/A
Green Room - The Pirate and The Princess Sketch: Jack and Kyle fight over who gets to play the pirate in a sketch, in order to kiss Chelsea, who will be playing the princess. But the whole thing backfires when they realize that Shane is playing the princess.; Bridgett's Slumber Party: Love Potion; Thelma Stump: Escaped Prisoners and Kyle Sullivan (partly); Good Burger: Five Dime (Kendré Berry from "R U All That") and his crew try to order drinks from Ed.; Know Your Stars: The announcer claims that Kyle Sullivan's eyes are purple, tricks him into flapping his arms after claiming that he could fly by flapping his arms, and calls him a liar for claiming he could fly.; Jamie, Christina, Jack, and Totally Kyle introduce "Drake Bell"; Musical Guest: Drake Bell ("Everything's Gonna Be OK"); (Final Episode to feature Shane Lyons, Giovonnie Samuels, and Jamie Lynn Spears)
160	14	"Avril Lavigne"	Unknown	913	N/A
161	15	"Substitute Jack"	Unknown	914	N/A
162	16	"Aaron Carter"	Unknown	915	N/A
