= Foiles =

Foiles is a surname. Notable people with the surname include:

- Hank Foiles (1929–2024), American baseball player
- Lisa Foiles (born 1986), American actress, presenter, video game journalist, model, and author
