= Cherry (band) =

Australian pop music group

- Origin: Sydney, New South Wales, Australia
- Genre: Pop
- Years active: 1998–1999
- Label: Sony
- Past members: Amy Canto; Empress Camielle; Gerri Mackay; Hayley Toomey; Zoe Trilsbach

Cherry were an Australian pop music group from the late 1990s. The five founding vocalists were Amy Canto, Empress Camielle, Hayley Toomey, Gerri Mackay and Zoe Trilsbach. Two of their singles reached the ARIA Singles Chart top 60, "S.O.S." (September 1998) and "Saddest Song" (July 1999). Amy and Zoe left the group, which continued as a trio but disbanded soon after in 1999.

== History ==
Cherry were a short-lived pop group with five vocalists, Amy Canto, Empress Camielle, Hayley Toomey, Gerri Mackay and Zoe Trilsbach, which formed in Sydney in 1998. At that time they were all in their late teens. Their debut single, "S.O.S." (September 1998), produced by Michael Szumowski (former keyboardist with Indecent Obsession), was released on Columbia Records and Sony Music Entertainment. It is co-written by Dane DeViller, Sean Hosein and Steve Kipner. It reached the ARIA Singles Chart top 60.

The label reworked the band's image with a more edgy approach, resulting in the group recording a cover version of Transvision Vamp's, "I Want Your Love". One of its B-sides, "The Way You Do", is co-written by Szumowski and Toni Pearen. "I Want Your Love" reached the top 70, and the label spent time on promotion in teen magazines and local appearances. The group went on a club tour around Australia, mostly at gay venues.

The group released their third single, "Saddest Song", written by Diane Warren, a ballad originally recorded by American R&B group For Real as "The Saddest Song I Ever Heard". The CD single featured a dance remix and R&B versions. It reached No. 46 on the ARIA charts in July 1999. At this time Zoe and Amy left the group, and Camielle, Gerri and Hayley continued as a three-piece. They re-recorded all the tracks that had been finished for their proposed debut album, Sacred Kiss, and re-recorded "Saddest Song" as a three piece. A new music video was made for the song for potential use on music TV shows, but the single and album were cancelled by the record label.

With no further official releases, the group disbanded by the end of 1999. Their album, Sacred Kiss, featuring a title track also penned by Warren, was not released. Camielle had a short solo career in 2002, issuing a single, "Yada Yada Yada". Szumowski later worked with reality TV pop contestants Bardot, Guy Sebastian and Shannon Noll.

== Discography ==
=== Singles ===
List of singles, with selected chart positions
Title	Year	Peak chart positions
Title	Year	AUS
"S.O.S."	1998	54
"I Want Your Love"	1999	65
"Saddest Song"	1999	46
