= All That season 3 =

All That
- Season 3
- Starring: Amanda Bynes; Lori Beth Denberg; Katrina Johnson; Kel Mitchell; Alisa Reyes; Josh Server; Kenan Thompson
- No. of episodes: 20

Release
- Original network: Nickelodeon
- Original release: November 16, 1996 – November 8, 1997

Season chronology
- ← Previous; Season 2 Next → Season 4

The third season of All That ran from November 16, 1996, to November 8, 1997, and contained 20 episodes, as well as a music special episode.

Many changes to the show happened before the start of the season started. This was the only season recorded at Paramount Pictures after moving from Nickelodeon Studios, but before moving to Nickelodeon on Sunset. Original cast member Angelique Bates did not return to the show after her contract had expired. The producers hired Amanda Bynes to fill the void in the cast. This would also be the final season for Katrina Johnson and Alisa Reyes, with Johnson leaving midway through this season. The producers hired Tricia Dickson as a cast member for the later half of the season. However she was put into featured status and mostly played supporting roles during her short time on the show.

During the summer, the film Good Burger was released. It was All That's only feature film to be made based on the sketch of the same name. The movie grossed more than $20 million, but received generally negative reviews from critics. Mitchell and Thompson were the main stars of the film, while Denberg and Server had supporting roles in the film. Mitchell, Denberg, and Server reprised their roles from the Good Burger sketch in the film.

The intro remains the same as the first two seasons. However, all of the Bates parts are edited out and are replaced with Bynes. New group shots of the entire cast were taped as well.

This was the first season to air on The N back in 2008, and it was the second season to air on The '90s Are All That on August 22, 2011.

This season was taped from July 1996 to February 1997.

== Cast ==
Repertory players

- Amanda Bynes
- Lori Beth Denberg (Note: Vital Information anchor)
- Katrina Johnson (final episode: February 22, 1997)
- Kel Mitchell
- Alisa Reyes
- Josh Server
- Kenan Thompson

Notes

Featured players

- Tricia Dickson (first episode: September 27, 1997)

== Episodes ==
No. overall	No. in season	Title	Original release date	Prod. code	U.S. households (in millions)
37	1	"Tia & Tamera Mowry/LL Cool J"	November 16, 1996	338	2.27
Green Room-Meet Amanda: A new cast member, Amanda Bynes, comes to town. She is annoyingly sweet and perky, offering cookies to the boys and stuffed animals (bear, tiger, and bunny) to the girls. The other cast members despise her, but Kevin loves her - especially when Amanda gives him a fancy recliner. But when a button on the recliner sends Kevin flying into space, the cast members change their minds and welcome Amanda.; Cooking with Randy: Mandy (Angelique) was locked up in a chocolate rehabilitation center after going insane during a chocolatey wild weekend, so Randy interviews some prospective new co-hosts like Sandy (Alisa). He then interviews Tandy Spork (Josh), the home economics teacher of Dullmont.; Vital Information w/ Lori Beth Denberg; Good Burger: Ed spits out food onto a customer (Katrina), messes up a soda ordered by another customer (Josh), and meets twins (guest stars Tia Mowry and Tamera Mowry).; Everyday French with Pierre Escargot; The Gifted Class: Principal Pimpell teaches a "special" class of dimwits on numbers with students like Lump Maroon, and students who are amazed by the light switch, except the new student, Trudy, the smartest in the class (Amanda).; Superdude introduces Musical Guest: LL Cool J – "Loungin (Who Do Ya Luv)"; (First episode to feature Amanda Bynes)
38	2	"Montell Jordan"	November 23, 1996	339	N/A
Green Room-Kevin Gets Fired: It starts out with Kenan throwing darts at a picture of Kevin. Kevin is fired-and they have a new stage manager named Ronald. Surprisingly, the kids find themselves missing him! They decide to find him and get him his job back after Kevin got a new job as a bathroom manager.; Superdude vs. Bullies and Yogurl: Mark Cant and Penny Lane (Alisa) are at the supermarket when some bullies begin to make fun of them. They torment Mark by throwing him in a display of tomatoes, who runs into a women's bathroom...and a few seconds later, Superdude appears! He easily dispatches the bullies. Once they are gone, a delivery man appears with a giant tub of yogurt-which contains Yogurl (Kel), the dairy vixen! Superdude is knocked out for a while, but the Explaining Girl (Katrina) appears from inside the dairy display and cleans him up with a moist towelette. Superdude then uses his "cold breath" to transform Yogurl into a frozen treat, which all of the supermarket patrons eat!; Vital Information w/ Lori Beth Denberg; Repairman In Space: When Captain Snivel (Kenan) of the Space Shuttle Inferior is trapped outside, the other members of the crew (Josh and Katrina) try to repair the door. Repairman (Kel) falls from the ceiling and takes a stick of dynamite to the hatch, blowing half the spaceship up! He then "repairs" the captain's jet pack, which sends him flying into space without a helmet! The other astronauts escape just as Repairman begins to use a saw to destroy everything.; Everyday French with Pierre Escargot; Show & Tell: A student, Robert (Josh), shows his chicken pox and gives his classmates the disease. Others include Sheryl's (Amanda) penny collection (totaling $1,627.23) to make the students asleep and Sarah Hoopshire's (Katrina) lead pipe to hurt the class; Vital Introduction Musical Guest: Montell Jordan – "I Like"
39	3	"Oliver Muirhead/Immature ft Smooth and Kel Mitchell"	November 30, 1996	340	1.89
Green Room-Amanda's Gotta Dance: Let's Cha-Cha! Amanda's gone dance crazy! The other kids try to get her to stop, but she says she's "just gotta dance". To make matters worse, everyone that tries to stop her starts dancing, too-even Kevin! They finally all conga out of the Green Room.; Good Burger: Ed stuffs the health inspector (guest star Oliver Muirhead) into the milkshake machine.; Vital Information w/ Lori Beth Denberg; Cooking with Randy and Andy: Randy interviews a new possible co-host, Andy (Amanda), who is a chocolate lover like himself. However, the interview quickly devolves into a debate over which one of them loves chocolate more.; Everyday French with Pierre Escargot; The BIG Note: Miss Fingerly catches a student, Raymond (Josh), passing a HUGE note (seemingly about a thousand pages long) about chicken noodle soup to another student, Beverly (Alisa). She decides to make him read it out loud. Given the speed at which Raymond appears to be reading--he begins reading at 11:00 AM and by 9:00 PM appears to have finished about 1/5 of it--this presumably takes three days and two nights altogether. While he is reading, another student, Greg (Kenan), has a dream that it takes 60 years. In the dream, Raymond is played in middle age by guest star Jack Kenny, and in old age by guest star Donald Cropper (1932-1999).; Vital Information w/ Lori Beth Denberg; Miss Fingerly's Class introduces Musical Guest: Immature (they fist-bump Greg; this is taking place in his dream, in which, after Raymond has been reading his chicken noodle soup note to Beverly, the students are now in their mid-70s [and one of them, Jennifer, is deceased], and the note still has about 10 pages to go) feat. Smooth and Kel Mitchell- "Watch Me Do My Thing"
40	4	"Dru Hill"	December 7, 1996	341	2.22
Green Room-The Cake Surprise: The girls bake a cake and find Josh's underwear from the freezer in it and Kevin ate a piece of cake that had Josh's underwear on it.; Ishboo receives a house call from the doctor and thinks that he's sick (brief appearance of Ren and Stimpy); Vital Information w/ Lori Beth Denberg; Island Girls are "visited" by Kiki's equally crazy sister, Didi (Katrina), who came by swimming (600 miles, according to Fran), brings them a seashell, and just leaves them stranded on the island. She has accidentally dropped her walkie-talkie, which Fran starts to use to call for help, but Kiki notices that it's Didi's, and throws it back to her.; Mavis & Clavis: Substitute Teachers in Shop Class. They build a red Pontiac GTO convertible, in which they offer to take the other students for a ride.; Pierre Escargot introduces Musical Guest: Dru Hill – "Tell Me"
41	5	"Tyra Banks/Blackstreet"	December 21, 1996	342	N/A
Green Room-Kevin's Prank: Kevin tries to pull a prank on the cast. As one might expect, it backfires. He gets revenge on the kids.; Good Burger: Fantasy Ed and dreams about his marriage.; Special Guest: Tyra Banks: Vital Information w/ Lori Beth Denberg; Ask Ashley: The adorable Ashley (Amanda) reads letters and gives advice to their writers. Unfortunately, everyone asking for advice is completely stupid. One writer, Tracy Sullivan, doesn't even know how to turn over her peanut butter and jelly sandwich! Ashley goes on violent rants against everyone that sends her a letter.; Class Cowboy: Howdy! A new student, Dusty Pants (Josh), from the Wild, Wild West joins Ms. Fingerly's class.; Peter & Flem: Peter treats his wounds with fresh bandages while Flem uses his as chip dip. Also, Peter find something special: a shiny penny. Flem also finds something special: a hobo (writer Heath Seifert)!; Pierre Escargot Introduces Musical Guest: Blackstreet – "No Diggity"
42	6	"A Tribe Called Quest"	December 28, 1996	343	N/A
Green Room-Sumo Kel: Kel decides to leave and become a sumo wrestler.; Ishboo visits the Psychiatrist.; Vital Information w/ Lori Beth Denberg; Island Girls vs. Natives; Lemonade Scammer & Co: The scammer (Katrina) finds and hires another lemonade scammer (Amanda) just like her. They make $678--$528 off of a golfer (Kenan), and the other $150 off of Connie Muldoon (Lori Beth).; Island Girls Intro Musical Guest: A Tribe Called Quest – "Stressed Out"; This episode aired on TeenNick's The '90s Are All That on December 4, 2011, and was also skipped during re-runs on The-N in 2008.
43	7	"702"	January 11, 1997	344	2.09
Green Room-Lord Swaynesboro: Josh gets hit on the head and thinks he's "Lord Swaynseboro of Fontcastle." The kids are annoyed, and must get him back to normal. They soon find that the only way to do this is to hit Josh on the head again!; Meet the Maroons: We meet Lump Maroon (Kel) and the rest of his family; his parents Grover (Tim Goodwin) and Fern (Lori Beth), and his brother and sister, Emily (Josh) and Chuck (Alisa).; Vital Information w/ Lori Beth Denberg; Good Burger: Ed messes up the birthday party of a girl named Peggy (Amanda).; Bradley The Big Ol' Baby: The big ol' baby is in Miss Fingerly's class.; Peter & Flem Intro Musical Guest: 702 – "Steelo"
44	8	"Tony! Toni! Toné!"	January 18, 1997	345	2.34
Green Room-Josh Has Hiccups: Josh Gets Hiccups. The cast members demonstrate some of their unique Hiccup Cures. Kenan gets the hiccups and the girls get insane by curing his hiccups.; The Okrah Show: Today's Topic: Self Defense; Vital Information w/ Lori Beth Denberg; The Geek Club: A cool kid (Kel) tries to join a club only for geeks and nerds (Katrina, Alisa, Josh, Amanda, and Kenan).; Everyday French with Pierre Escargot; Ask Ashley; Peter & Flem; Ask Ashley Intro Musical Guest: Tony! Toni! Toné! feat. DJ Quik – "Let's Get Down"
45	9	"Chris Farley/Mint Condition"	January 25, 1997	346	2.65
Green Room-Katrina's Time Machine: Katrina builds a time machine that turns the cast members 10 years younger. When the cast turned back to the right ages of the present, they turned Kevin into a kid; Cooking with Randy & Farley: Randy is joined by a special guest, Chef Farley (Chris Farley) and his Ketchup Boy (Drew Carey). Farley has the same feelings for ketchup that Randy does for chocolate. The two soon begin to battle over which treat tastes better.; Special Guest: Chris Farley: Vital Information w/ Lori Beth Denberg; Coach Kreeton's Date; Squash-Hick: Squash-Hick and Squash-Girl talk about what they love the most and wait for Squash-Boy to come out but the costume isn't ready yet so Josh and Katrina have to stall.; Vital Introduction Musical Guest: Mint Condition – "What Kind of Man Would I Be?"
46	10	"112"	February 1, 1997	347	2.07
Green Room-Eatin' the Corn: Lori Beth has a nightmare that the other kids are eating the Big Ear of Corn. When she wakes up she finds out they're eating Kevin.; Earboy Bullies: Earboy and Pizzaface have problems with bullies so, they go to Ross Perot for help.; Vital Information w/ Lori Beth Denberg; Super Okrah (Superdude Vs Milkman on The Okrah Show)-Okrah interviews superheroes like U Go Girl (Alisa) and Superdude. The Explaining Girl cleaned Superdude up with a squegie after being defeated by Milk Man.; Haunted Hand; Miss Fingerly's Class intro musical guest 112.; Musical Guest: 112 – "Only You"
47	11	"Sherman Hemsley/Nas"	February 8, 1997	348	2.39
Green Room-Kenan's Feeling Weird: Kenan doesn't feel well-and his symptoms are extremely odd!; Special Guest: Sherman Hemsley: Good Burger: Ed shows off Good Burger's new burger with 4 meat patties.; Vital Information w/ Lori Beth Denberg; Island Girls Independence Day; Everyday French with Pierre Escargot; Ask Ashley; Loud Librarian Introduces Musical Guest: Nas – "Street Dreams"
48	12	"John Leguizamo/Mona Lisa"	February 15, 1997	349	2.58
Green Room-Trapped!: The cast members are trapped in the Green Room, but they use Amanda's head to open the doors.; USS Spaceship: Is invaded by a weird mocking alien (guest star John Leguizamo).; Special Guest: John Leguizamo: Vital Information w/ Lori Beth Denberg; Earboy: Walter & Pizzaface start a band called "The Mutations." But whom can they get as a guitar player? Of course--Ross Perot! And a bass player? Perot's hobo (writer Heath Seifert), whom he's kept in a trunk for two years!; Everyday French with Pierre Escargot; Dr. Bynes sketch is interrupted when the audience start playing beach ball and then "Kevin Ball"; Ask Ashley intro musical guest Mona Lisa; Musical Guest: Mona Lisa – "Just Wanna Please U"
49	13	"Ray J"	February 22, 1997	350	2.13
Green Room-Kel's Birthday: It's Kel's birthday, and the kids celebrate in some very strange ways.; Repairman comes to repair a pizza parlor and broken relationship (Alisa & Josh).; Vital Information w/ Lori Beth Denberg; Loud Librarian: Ms. Hushbaum's ultra-quiet library is running business as usual, as well as Ms. Hushbaum's usual activities like playing with a Jack-in-the-Box, playing on a pinball machine, lifting a weight, doing the "Macarena", and engaging in a bullfight.; Pierre Escargot; Everything Sticky: A store where everything is slimy and sticky owned by Kenan.; Lori Beth meets Ray-J in the green room and gives him her demo.; Repairman Intro Musical Guest: Ray J – "Let It Go"; (Last episode to feature Katrina Johnson but, she was still seen and credited in the seasons 1-3 (1994-1997) opening credit sequence until the end of season 3)
50	14	"Dr. Joyce Brothers & Sherman Hemsley/Heavy D"	September 6, 1997	356	2.30
Green Room-Get in the Box: A big cardboard box arrives in the green room. The cast enters (Kel), one after another (Alisa and Tricia, then Kenan, then Josh, then Lori Beth), and hops into the box. When asked what they are doing, the response is always the same: "Having fun. Get in the box!" Amanda was the only one to not be in the box; Good Burger: Food Critic; Special Guest: Sherman Hemsley: Vital Information w/ Lori Beth Denberg; Bradley's Big Ol' Date: Bradley's date (Tricia); Ask Ashley: Ashley is once again infuriated by a foolish letter. But after her tirade, none other than famed anger management psychiatrist Dr. Joyce Brothers appears! She teaches Ashley some anger management techniques, and tries to read a letter herself. Unfortunately, it is about a boy who doesn't know how to turn the lights on in his house, and Dr. Joyce goes on a tirade of her own.; Special Guest: Dr. Joyce Brothers: Vital Introduction; Musical Guest: Heavy D. – "Big Daddy"
51	15	"Monica"	September 13, 1997	354	2.39
Green Room-The Fight: Lori Beth has a fight with The Big Ear of Corn. Luckily Amanda makes Lori Beth want to make up with him.; Okrah: Secret Crushes; Vital Information w/ Lori Beth Denberg; USS Spaceship VS. The Pigginoids: While flying through space, the U.S.S. Spaceship crew, which consists of Captain Tantrum (Amanda), Officer Canker (Josh), Officer Ulcer (Kenan), Sosumi (Alisa), and Singo (Kel), encounters the ultra-greedy Pigginoids, who are led by Swinestein (Tricia). They want to "hog" up the whole universe, despite Captain Tantrum's protest- "space is very...spacious!" The crew manages to turn the Pigginoids greed against them, though, when Ulcer sends over a giant missile with a bow on it. The Pigginoids accept the gift, which the U.S.S. Spaceship crew energizes, sending bacon flying everywhere.; Ask Ashley; Miss Fingerly intro Musical Guest: Monica – "For You I Will"
52	16	"Aaliyah"	September 20, 1997	351	2.48
Green Room-Kenan's New Hairdo: Kenan has a new hairstyle-and it's very tall and blue. The kids won't share their opinions of it. Kevin also got the same hairstyle.; Good Burger: Scratch & Win; Vital Information w/ Lori Beth Denberg; Complaint Department; Coach Kreeton: Kreeton is the new Hall Monitor (Featuring: Former Cast Member Katrina Johnson); Peter & Flem; Thumbtax Introduces Aaliyah; Musical Guest: Aaliyah – "One In a Million"
53	17	"For Real"	September 27, 1997	353	2.75
Green Room-Tricia's Test: The cast members make Tricia do weird things to get on the show. She must box Kevin, and lift Josh up in the air using only her brain. She passes every test!; Detective Dan: Mistakenly goes to a family's house and accuse them of robbing their own house!; Vital Information w/ Lori Beth Denberg; Miss Piddlin: The New Lunch Lady (Kenan) who will hurt anybody who won't eat her peas.; Everyday French with Pierre Escargot; Really Loud Librarian: Studying is always a joy in Ms. Hushbaum's library. She'll go ballistic if anyone makes a single sound, so the place should be quiet, while Ms. Hushbaum engages in several other activities like installing a bell on a door, labeling the books, playing a piano, performing a rock tune, and going on a fox hunt.; Vital Introduction Musical Guest: For Real – "The Saddest Song I Ever Heard"
54	18	"MC Lyte"	October 4, 1997	355	2.17
Green Room-The Wrong Dinner: The cast members receive the wrong dinner orders, including a roast beef sandwich, spaghetti with golf balls, a fire hose, a wad of fried hair, and a foot! They throw their food at Kenan, who puts the foot in his cheeseburger with lettuce, tomatoes, onions, mayonnaise, and brown mustard (he wanted plain yellow mustard).; You Can't Win: The game show where no one can win, hosted by Jerry Fytootal (Josh). The contestants are Megan (Amanda); Shelley (Alisa); and Antoine (Kenan). Near the end of the sketch, Antoine gets "an entire ten seconds" to consume a big bowl of vanilla pudding; with 1 1/2 seconds left, though, he dumps it on top of Jerry's head and bolts, laughing and smiling.; Vital Information w/ Lori Beth Denberg; Class Disruptions; Mavis & Clavis in Shout!: Mavis & Clavis accidentally get Amanda & Josh arrested while doing a sketch. So they perform The Isley Brothers' hit "Shout" in the audience; Antoine Introduces Musical Guest: MC Lyte – "Cold Rock a Party"
55	19	"Erykah Badu"	October 25, 1997	357	1.96
Green Room-The Lifeguard: A lifeguard named Kevin guards the green room and saves Tricia, Alisa and Kel.; Miss Piddlin; Vital Information with Lori Beth Denberg; USS Spaceship: This sketch details how Captain Tantrum became the captain of the USS Spaceship after Officer Ulcer accidentally vaporized the previous captain named Captain Peril.; Everyday French with Pierre Escargot; Squash Hick: The squash boy costume for Kenan isn't ready so Josh and Amanda go audience fishing.; Peter & Flem; Good Burger intro musical guest Erykah Badu – "On and On"; (Last episode to feature Alisa Reyes and Tricia Dickson)
56	20	"Az Yet"	November 8, 1997	352	2.63
Green Room-Too Much Popcorn: Amanda cooks too much popcorn, and it fills the entire Green Room! Then a popcorn shark arrives; Superdude's Evil Twin: The civilians can't tell the difference between Superdude and his evil "twin" (Amanda) who is trying to rob a bank. Testing superpowers doesn't work-both Superdudes are super-strong (although Amanda only tears a piece of paper in half, with difficulty). The Sweaty Woman's pitcher of milk is tossed on the two, and only the real Superdude is knocked out. Evil Superdude tries to finish robbing the bank, and stops to collect her free toaster (comes with opening an account). Thankfully, the Sweaty Woman has a blow dryer, and the civilians dry off Superdude, who uses his magnetic butt to attract the toaster and catch the fake.; Vital Information w/ Lori Beth Denberg; Family vs. Family (The Kopelows vs. the Maroons): The Maroons go against the Kopelows in this game show. The Kopelows are named after the stage manager Kevin Kopelow.; Everyday French with Pierre Escargot; Miss Fingerly: The students can't understand Miss Fingerly when she gets a tooth pulled.; USS Spaceship intro Musical Guest: Az Yet – "Hard To Say I'm Sorry"

=== Special (1997) ===
Title	Original release date	Prod. code	U.S. households (in millions)
"Music Special"	December 21, 1997	358	N/A
Mavis and Clavis sneak past the guards of All That and try to convince the cast to let them start the show. The cast shows Mavis and Clavis the kind of music that is on All That by showing some of the best musical guests on All That (from the first two seasons only) like Coolio, Da Brat, TLC, Faith Evans, and Naughty by Nature. The cast falls asleep so Mavis and Clavis go to perform, but the show is already over. Meanwhile, Ed is cleaning up Good Burger when he falls into a portal and does a music video with Immature called "Watch Me Do My Thing".
