= You Don't Know Nothin' =

Single by For Real

from the album It's a Natural Thang
- Released: August 23, 1994
- Recorded: 1994
- Genre: R&B
- Label: A&M
- Songwriters: Mervyn Warren & Hallerin Hill
- Producer: Mervyn Warren

For Real singles chronology
| "Easy to Love" (1994) | "You Don't Know Nothin'" (1994) | "Like I Do" (1996) |

"You Don't Know Nothin'" is a song by American R&B and soul quartet For Real, released in August 1994 by A&M Records as the final single from their debut album, It's a Natural Thang (1994). It became the biggest single in the UK from the album. In the US, the song peaked at numbers 60 and 88 on the Cash Box Top 100 and Billboard Hot 100 charts.

== Tracklisting ==
You Don't Know Nothin' / Easy To Love

1.) You Don't Know Nothin' (Edit) [3:20]
2.) You Don't Know Nothin' (E-Smoove's Fever CD Edit) [5:29]
3.) Easy To Love (Ballad Version) [4:14]
4.) Easy To Love (In Da Soul Old Skool 12") [4:24]

== Charts ==
| Chart (1994) | Peak position |
|---|---|
| US Billboard Hot 100 | 88 |
| US Hot R&B Singles (Billboard) | 80 |
| US UK Top 75 (Billboard) | 54 |
| US Cash Box Top 100 | 60 |
