= Like I Do (For Real song) =

1996 single by For Real

Single by For Real

from the album Free
- B-side: "Free"
- Released: August 16, 1996
- Recorded: 1995–1996
- Genre: R&B
- Length: 4:06
- Label: Rowdy
- Songwriters: Dallas Austin, Holland–Dozier–Holland
- Producer: Dallas Austin

For Real singles chronology
"You Don't Know Nothin'" (1995)	"Like I Do" (1996)	"The Saddest Song I Ever Heard" (1997)

"Like I Do" is a song by American contemporary R&B group For Real, issued as the lead single from their second album, Free (1996). The remix of the song samples "No One's Gonna Love You" by The S.O.S. Band, and it was the group's highest chart appearance on the US Billboard Hot 100, peaking at number 72 as well as number 75 on the US Cash Box Top 100. The official music video was directed by Kevin Bray.

== Track listing ==
On the European CD single:-

- 1. "Like I Do" (Original Mix) 4:08
- 2. "Like I Do" (No One's Gonna Love You - Full Crew Old Skool Mix) 4:14
- 3. "Like I Do" (No One's Gonna Love You - Wop Dem Dancehall Mix Mix) 5:55
- 4. "Like I Do" (Junior's Full Vocal Mix) 8:47
- 5. "Like I Do" (Junior's Club Dub) 8:31
- 6. "Like I Do" (No One's Gonna Love You - Dallas Austin Remix) 4.15

== Weekly charts ==
Chart (1996–1997)	Peak position
New Zealand (Recorded Music NZ)	49
UK Singles (Official Charts)	45
UK Dance (Official Charts)	11
UK Hip Hop/R&B (Official Charts)	8
US Billboard Hot 100	72
US Dance Club Songs (Billboard)	30
US Hot R&B/Hip-Hop Songs (Billboard)	48
US Cash Box Top 100	75

=== Year-end charts ===
Chart (1997)	Position
UK Urban (Music Week)	20
