= Pool Party Massacre =

- Poster
- Directed by: Drew Marvick
- Written by: Drew Marvick
- Produced by: Drew Marvick; Brian Mills
- Starring: LeeAnna Vamp; Mark Justice; Alexis Adams
- Cinematography: Brian Mills
- Edited by: Brian Mills
- Music by: Mike Conway
- Release date: October 2016
- Running time: 81 minutes
- Country: United States
- Language: English

Pool Party Massacre is a 2016 American comedy horror film written, directed, and produced by Drew Marvick.

== Plot ==
What started as a relaxing summer day by the pool for a group of high-maintenance young socialites quickly becomes a nightmare when an unknown killer begins stalking and murdering them one by one.

== Cast ==
- LeeAnna Vamp as Mrs. Stevens
- Mark Justice as Troy
- Alexis Adams as Tiffany
- John Molinaro as Mr. Winthorpe
- Destiny Faith Nelson as Jasmine
- Drew Marvick as Blaine Winthorpe
- Jenifer Marvick as Kelly
- Paul Card as Ralph
- Kristin Noel McKusick as Blair Winthorpe
- Nick Byer as Clay
- Sally Burnswello as Mrs. Winthorpe
- Trevor Layne as Chet
- Crystal Stoney as Britney
- Dora Deceuninck as Dora
- Jimmy Grosse as Danny

== Production ==
Marvick intended the film to be a throwback to 80s slasher films. He enlisted the film's shooting director prior to writing the script. The film had a shooting budget of $6,000. Marc Schoenbach was brought on to create the film poster, which Marvick wanted to have the feel of an 80s horror film.

== Release ==
Pool Party Massacre had its world premiere at FearNYC on October 22, 2016, the festival's inaugural year. This was followed by a release on April 20, 2017.

== Reception ==
Critical reception has been favorable from horror and pop culture outlets. Rue Morgue wrote a favorable review, praising the practical effects while stating that the movie had issues with its pacing. PopHorror was similarly favorable, as they felt that it was a "fairly standard campy slasher film, but don’t take that to mean that it’s predictable. There are some nice twists and turns along the way, some of which I was able to figure out and some that caught me off guard." A reviewer for the Library Journal was also favorable, writing that "It brought me back to the horror films of the 80's, which was Marvick's intention. Massacre was silly, bloody, and fun—just the way I like it. Stick it next to Friday the 13th and Sleepaway Camp on your shelf immediately. "

Scream magazine was more critical, stating that "Singularly dedicated to delivering a slasher flick in the form of its base elements, Pool Party Massacre is admirable in its commitment to its own simplicity, even if that means it has to bulk up its run-time with excruciatingly tedious characters spewing excruciatingly tedious dialogue."

== Sequel ==
In 2019 Marvick launched a crowdfunding campaign on IndieGoGo to fund a sequel. He had not initially planned to create a sequel for Pool Party Massacre, "mostly because I never really thought anyone would watch the movie", but began writing one after being approached by fans. The campaign was successfully funded within ten days and Marvick has stated that the film's script has been inspired by sequels such as Slumber Party Massacre II, Return of the Living Dead Part II, and The Texas Chainsaw Massacre 2. The film was shot in 2023 and stars Lisa Foiles. As of 2025, the film is still in post-production.
