= You Don't Wanna Miss =

Single by For Real

from the album It's a Natural Thang
- Released: January 29, 1994
- Recorded: 1993
- Genre: R&B
- Label: A&M
- Songwriters: Sherree Ford-Payne; Wendell Wellman

For Real singles chronology
"You Don't Wanna Miss" (1994)	"Easy to Love" (1994)

Music video
- "You Don't Wanna Miss" on YouTube

"You Don't Wanna Miss" is the title of a R&B single by For Real. It was the first single from their debut album It's a Natural Thang. Masters at Work remixes appeared on the Billboard dance chart in January 1995.

== Tracklisting ==
Maxi-Promo CD

1.) You Don't Wanna Miss (Indasoul 7" w/ Acapella Intro) [3:56]
2.) You Don't Wanna Miss (Indasoul 7") [3:55]
3.) You Don't Wanna Miss (Silkadelic Radio 7") [4:19]
4.) You Don't Wanna Miss (LP Edit) [3:20]
5.) You Don't Wanna Miss (Real Raw Radio Edit) [4:05]
6.) You Don't Wanna Miss (Hip Hop For Real Mix) [3:52]
7.) You Don't Wanna Miss (Silkadelic 12") [4:56]

== Chart positions ==
Chart (1994)	Peak position
U.S. Billboard Hot R&B/Hip-Hop Songs	28
U.S. Billboard Hot Dance Break Outs	5
U.S. Billboard Hot Dance Club Songs	32
U.S. Billboard Hot 100	101
