= Easy to Love (For Real song) =

Single by For Real

from the album It's a Natural Thang
- Released: 1994
- Recorded: 1993
- Genre: R&B
- Label: A&M
- Songwriters: Necia Bray, Jason Hess

For Real singles chronology
"You Don't Wanna Miss" (1994)	"Easy to Love" (1994)	"You Don't Know Nothin'" (1994)

Music video
- "Easy to Love" on YouTube

"Easy to Love" is the title of a R&B single by For Real, it was the second single from their debut album It's a Natural Thang. Billboard magazine noted "super-tight harmonies that are prominent, but not overshadowing; instantly memorable melody stands as the cut's focal point.

== Tracklisting ==
Maxi-Promo CD & 12" Vinyl

1.) Easy To Love (LP Edit) [4:11]
2.) Easy To Love (Silky Soul 7") [4:18]
3.) Easy To Love (Da Eazy Urban Remix Radio) [3:56]
4.) Easy To Love (Jason Remix) [4:21]
5.) Easy To Love (In Da Soul Old Skool Radio) [3:58]

== Chart positions ==
Chart (1994)	Peak position
U.S. Billboard Hot R&B Singles	65
U.S. Billboard Hot Dance Break Outs	4
