= Free (For Real album) =

Studio album by For Real
- Released: September 17, 1996
- Recorded: December 1995–July 1996
- Studios: D.A.R.P. Studios (Atlanta, GA); Riversound Studios (Lithonia, GA); The Record Plant (Los Angeles, CA); Soulpower Studio (Los Angeles, CA); Silent Studios (Atlanta, GA); Saturn Sound (Los Angeles, CA)
- Genre: R&B
- Length: 54:06
- Label: Rowdy
- Producers: Babyface; Craig B; Dallas Austin; Daryl Simmons; Mario Winans; Soulshock; Stephen Bray; Tony Shepperd

For Real chronology
It's a Natural Thang (1994)	Free (1996)

Singles from Free
- 1. "Like I Do" Released: August 16, 1996; 2. "The Saddest Song I Ever Heard" Released: February 22, 1997

Professional ratings
Review scores
Source	Rating
AllMusic	4/5 stars

Free is the second studio album by American R&B group For Real. It was released on September 17, 1996, via Rowdy Records. Recording sessions took place at D.A.R.P. Studios and Silent Studios in Atlanta, at Riversound Studios in Lithonia, at the Record Plant, SoulPower Studio and Saturn Sound in Los Angeles. Production was handled by Dallas Austin, Soulshock, Babyface, Craig B, Daryl Simmons, Mario Winans, Stephen Bray and Tony Shepperd. In the United States, the album debuted at number 100 on the Top R&B Albums chart. Its lead single, "Like I Do", peaked at number 72 on the US Billboard Hot 100, number 45 on the UK singles chart and number 49 in New Zealand. The follow-up single, "The Saddest Song I Ever Heard", only made it to number 65 on the US Hot R&B/Hip-Hop Songs. The song "Love Will Be Waiting at Home" previously appeared in Waiting to Exhale: Original Soundtrack Album.

== Track listing ==
No.	Title	Writer(s)	Producer(s)	Length
1.	"Intro"	Dallas L. Austin	Dallas Austin	0:55
2.	"Like I Do"	Austin; Holland–Dozier–Holland	Dallas Austin	4:06
3.	"Good Morning Sunshine"	Austin; Eugene Record; William Nelson Sanders	Dallas Austin	4:13
4.	"Hold Me"	Austin	Dallas Austin	3:56
5.	"So in Love"	Necia Bray	Dallas Austin	4:20
6.	"Remember"	Carsten Schack; Kenneth Karlin	Soulshock	4:23
7.	"Will You Love Me"	N. Bray; Josina Elder; Latanyia Baldwin; Wendi Williams; Mario Winans; Kenneth Hickson	Mario Winans	4:20
8.	"The Saddest Song I Ever Heard"	Diane Warren	Daryl Simmons	4:39
9.	"Nothing Without You"	Schack; Karlin; Glen Stuart	Soulshock	4:45
10.	"How Can I Get Close to You"	Austin	Dallas Austin	4:08
11.	"Love Will Be Waiting at Home"	Kenneth Brian Edmonds	Babyface	5:16
12.	"For All of My Life"	Stephen Bray; Reginald Hamilton; Susan Carr; L. Davis	Stephen Bray; Tony Shepperd	3:56
13.	"Free"	N. Bray; Schack; Craig Bartock; Karlin	Soulshock; Craig B; Kenneth Karlin (add. voc.)	5:09
Total length:				54:06

Sample credits

- Track 3 contains portions of "Soulful Strut" performed by Young-Holt Unlimited.

== Personnel ==
- Necia Bray – vocals
- Josina Elder – vocals
- Latanyia Baldwin – vocals
- Wendi Williams – vocals
- Craig B – bass (tracks: 6, 9), guitar (track 9), producer (track 13)
- Daryl Simmons – keyboards & producer (track 8)
- Vance Taylor – piano (track 8)
- Ronnie Garrett – bass (track 8)
- Tomi Martin – guitar (track 10)
- Kenneth "Babyface" Edmonds – keyboards & producer (track 11)
- Alex Alessandroni – acoustic piano (track 11)
- Michael Thompson – bass (track 11)
- Paulinho da Costa – percussion (track 11)
- Trevor Veitch – guitar (track 12)
- Reggie Hamilton – bass (track 12)
- James Raymond – keyboards (track 12)
- Stephen Bray – percussion & producer (track 12)
- Curt Bisquera – percussion & drum programming (track 12)
- Abe Laboriel Jr. – percussion (track 12)
- Bill Meyers – strings conductor (track 12)
- Suzie Katayama – cello (track 12)
- Henry Ferber – violin (track 12)
- Ruth Johnson – violin (track 12)
- Karie Prescott – viola (track 12)
- Rick Sheppard – programming (tracks: 2–5, 10)
- Dallas Austin – producer (tracks: 1–5, 10), executive producer
- Carsten "Soulshock" Schack – producer & mixing (tracks: 6, 9, 13)
- Mario Winans – producer (track 7)
- Tony Shepperd – producer & engineering (track 12)
- Kenneth Karlin – additional vocal producer (track 13), mixing (tracks: 6, 9)
- Leslie Brathwaite – recording (tracks: 1–5, 10), mixing (tracks: 1–5)
- Manolo "Manny Marroquin" Marroquín – recording & mixing (tracks: 6, 9, 13)
- Brian Smith – recording & mixing (track 7)
- Thom Kidd – recording (track 8)
- Brad Gilderman – recording (track 11)
- Jon Gass – mixing (tracks: 8, 11)
- Neal H Pogue – mixing (track 10)
- Carlton Lynn – engineering assistant (tracks: 1–5, 10)
- Paul Thompson – engineering assistant (track 4)
- Kenny Hickson – engineering assistant (track 7)
- Alex Lowe – engineering assistant (track 8)
- Kevin Lively – engineering assistant (track 8)
- Mike Alvord – engineering assistant (track 8)
- Ricciano "Ricco" Lumpkins – engineering assistant (track 10)
- Herb Powers Jr. – mastering
- Sandy Lawrence – design
- RJ Muna – cover photo
- Arnold Turner – photography
- David Gates – A&R
- Kim Lumpkin – coordinator

== Charts ==
Chart (1996)	Peak position
US Top R&B/Hip-Hop Albums (Billboard)	100
