= It's a Natural Thang =

Studio album by For Real
- Released: March 22, 1994
- Recorded: 1993–1994
- Genre: R&B
- Length: 58:44
- Label: A&M
- Producers: Necia Bray, Fil Brown, Ray Cham, For Real, Jason Hess, John Howcott, Brian McKnight, Marc Nelson, Emanuel Officer, Donald Parks, Tony Robinson, Annie Roboff, Sol Survivor, Stoker, Mervyn Warren, Wendell Wellman

For Real chronology
It's a Natural Thang (1994)	Free (1996)

Singles from It's a Natural Thing
- 1. "You Don't Wanna Miss" Released: January 29, 1994; 2. "Easy to Love" Released: June 21, 1994; 3. "You Don't Know Nothin'" Released: August 23, 1994; 4. "D'yer Mak'er (Please Don't Go)" Released: September 28, 1994

It's a Natural Thang is the first album by R&B group For Real, released on March 22, 1994 (see 1994 in music).

== Track listing ==
1. "Easy to Love" (Necia Bray, John Hess) – 4:35
2. "Where Did Your Love Go?" (Bray, Hess, Huey Jackson) – 4:42
3. "You Don't Wanna Miss" (Sherree Ford-Payne, Wendell Wellman) – 3:48
4. "Just a Matter of Time" (Ray Cham, For Real) – 6:26
5. "Li'l Bit" (Cham, For Real) – 5:10
6. "Don't Wanna Love You Now" (Bray) – 5:03
7. "You Don't Know Nothin'" (Hallerin Hilton Hill, Mervyn Warren) – 3:57
8. "With This Ring (Say Yes)" (For Real, John Howcott, Emanuel Officer, Donald Parks) – 5:18
9. "D'yer Mak'er" (John Bonham, John Paul Jones, Jimmy Page, Robert Plant) – 5:15
10. "The Harder I Try" (Bray) – 4:21
11. "I Like" (Fil Brown, N'Dea Davenport, Tony Robinson) – 4:43
12. "Thinking of You" (For Real, Annie Roboff) – 4:56
13. "The Prayer" – 0:30

== Personnel ==
- Alex Al – bass guitar
- Gerald Albright – bass guitar, saxophone
- Marc Antoine – guitar
- George Archie – drums
- Francis Bacon – bass guitar
- Buddy Black – guitar
- Fil Brown – guitar, drums, keyboard
- Jonathan Buck – piano
- Ray Cham – piano, keyboard, multiple instruments
- Paulinho Da Costa – percussion
- Derrick Edmondson – saxophone
- David Ervin – keyboards, synthesizer programming
- For Real – background vocals
- Dave Foreman – guitar
- Jason Hess – multiple instruments
- John Howcott – keyboard
- Tim May – guitar
- Brian McKnight – strings, keyboard
- Donald Parks – keyboard
- Tony Robinson – keyboard
- Annie Roboff – multiple instruments
- Tory Ruffin – guitar
- Sol Survivor – keyboard, multiple instruments
- Art Zamora – guitar

Production

- Producers: Necia Bray, Fil Brown, Ray Cham, For Real, Jason Hess, John Howcott, Brian McKnight, Marc Nelson, Emanuel Officer, Donald Parks, Tony Robinson, Annie Roboff, Sol Survivor, Stoker, Mervyn Warren, Wendell Wellman
- Executive producers: Herb Jordan, Mark Mazzetti
- Engineers: Paul Arnold, Fil Brown, Milton Chan, Kenny Jackson, Rob Russell, Tony Shepperd, Stoker, Louie Teran
- Assistant engineers: Baraka, Tom Mahn, Brian Pollack, Dominique Schafer, Raymond Silva, Brian Young
- Mixing: Ray Cham, Barney Perkins, Tony Shepperd, Stoker, Mervyn Warren, Dave Way
- Mixing assistants: Milton Chan, Marc Frigo
- Mastering: Dave Collins
- Digital editing: Dave Collins
- Programming: Jason Hess
- Vocal arrangement: Necia Bray, Ray Cham, For Real, Sherree Ford-Payne, Jason Hess, Brian McKnight, Emanuel Officer, Annie Roboff
- Art direction: Sandy Brummels, Richard Frankel
- Photography: Victoria Pearson
- Make-up: Kim Davis
- Clothing/wardrobe: Debrae Little
