= The Saddest Song I Ever Heard =

Single by For Real

from the album Free
- B-side: "Free"
- Released: February 22, 1997
- Recorded: 1996
- Genre: R&B
- Label: Arista
- Songwriter(s): Diane Warren
- Producer(s): Daryl Simmons

For Real singles chronology
"Like I Do" (1996)	"The Saddest Song I Ever Heard" (1997)	"Hold Me" (1997)

Music video
- "The Saddest Song I Ever Heard" on YouTube

"The Saddest Song I Ever Heard" is the title of a R&B single by For Real. Written by Diane Warren. "The Saddest Song I Ever Heard" spent eight weeks on the US singles chart. The song would be covered two years later by Australian girl group Cherry. Their version, released with the shortened title "Saddest Song", peaked at #46 in Australia.

Sony BMG released the video to YouTube in 2007, since the video has received nearly 350,000 views as of October 2009.

== Personnel ==
Information taken from Discogs.

- Latanyia Baldwin, Necia Bray, Josina Elder, Wendi Williams : lead and background vocals
- Diane Warren : writer
- Daryl Simmons : producer, keyboards and programming
- Vance Taylor : piano
- Ronnie Garrett : bass
- Thom "TK" Kidd : recording engineer
- Jon Gass : mixing engineer
- Mike Alvord, Kevin Lively, Alex Lowe : assistant engineers

== Chart positions ==
Chart (1997)	Peak position
U.S. Billboard Hot R&B/Hip-Hop Songs	65
