= All That season 4 =

All That
- Season 4
- Starring: Amanda Bynes; Lori Beth Denberg; Leon Frierson; Christy Knowings; Kel Mitchell; Josh Server; Danny Tamberelli; Kenan Thompson
- No. of episodes: 21

Release
- Original network: Nickelodeon
- Original release: November 15, 1997 – December 5, 1998

Season chronology
- ← Previous; Season 3 Next → Season 5

All That's fourth season ran from November 15, 1997, to December 5, 1998. 21 episodes aired.

The show saw many changes before the start of the season. Original/former cast members Katrina Johnson and Alisa Reyes both had left the show, and former new cast member Tricia Dickson was fired to make room for new cast members. The producers hired Danny Tamberelli, Christy Knowings and Leon Frierson. This would be the final season for Lori Beth Denberg; in a live chat on Nick.com, she reasoned that she left All That, because she "was getting older." Denberg was the last original female cast member on the show before her departure.

As the season progressed, Zach McLemore and Victor Cohn-Lopez began appearing in sketches, and were listed in the credits as featured players. Unlike other cast members, neither were given a proper green room introduction; however, both would appear alongside the rest of the cast during the goodnights. This was their only season on the show.

The intro for this season features the cast on a red carpet premiere in old Hollywood. The cast exit separately out of a limo and walk down the carpet, where they are greeted by fans who are throwing roses and taking pictures. The musical guest is shown followed by the entire cast standing on the stairs as people take their pictures.

This is the first season to have more male cast members than female.

== Cast ==
=== Repertory players ===
- Amanda Bynes
- Lori Beth Denberg
- Leon Frierson
- Christy Knowings
- Kel Mitchell
- Josh Server
- Danny Tamberelli
- Kenan Thompson

=== Featured players ===
- Victor Cohn-Lopez (first episode: February 21, 1998)
- Zach McLemore (first episode: December 6, 1997)

== Episodes ==
No. overall	No. in season	Title	Original release date	Prod. code	U.S. households (in millions)
57	1	"Mase"	November 15, 1997	459	N/A
Green Room-New Cast Members: While the remaining cast members are reading new fan mail, they get a letter from Danny Tamberelli explaining how much he loves the show and dreams of joining the cast. So, the cast travels all the way to his house and decides to let him join the show, and while there, they meet his friend, Christy and invite her to join too. When they get back to the studio, they meet young Leon in the audience, and generously allow him to join the cast.; The Tooth Fairy (Kenan) tries to get a tooth from a little boy (Leon); Vital Information; Bacteria's Auditions: Rash (previously played by Alisa Reyes) quit the band so the guys need a new bass player.; Ask Ashley; Bacteria intro Mase; *Musical Guest: Mase "Feel So Good" (First episode to feature Leon Frierson, Christy Knowings, and Danny Tamberelli)
58	2	"Busta Rhymes"	November 22, 1997	460	2.74
Green Room-Kenan's Teeth: Kenan can't find his toothbrush and won't start the show until his teeth are clean.; Repairman: "Repairs" the Girls' Bathroom.; Vital Information; What Do You Do?: The Game show where panelists must guess what the contestant's weird hobby is. The host Is Winter Wonders (Christy). The panelists are Principal Pimpell, Miss Fingerly, Coach Kreeton, and Kevin (who isn't wearing any pants), where they have to guess the hobbies of two different contestants (Amanda and Leon).; Jack Campbell: Fat Cop (Danny) comes to the rescue when a pair of kids' stuff is stolen. But can he stop asking questions about their lunches and eating all the food in their fridge long enough to find the crooks? Of course not!; Antoine Intro Musical Guest: Busta Rhymes "Dangerous"
59	3	"Tommy Davidson/Robyn"	December 6, 1997	461	2.45
Green Room-Josh in Sleep Mode: Josh is fast asleep! Amanda, Leon, Christy and Kel try many ways to wake him up. Throwing water on him, hitting him over the head with various blunt objects, but nothing works...then they realize he wasn't plugged in!; Cooking with Randy & Grandy: Randy's Grandfather visits him on his show and forbids Randy from ever eating chocolate again. Special Guest: Tommy Davidson; Vital Information; Have a Nice Day: Leroy (Leon) & Fuzz on Homework; Everyday French with Pierre Escargot; We Got Pants: A new clothing store is the hottest place to visit. Its name says that it has pants--and it does. Unfortunately for all of the customers, it only has one pair!; Coach Kreeton intro Musical Guest: Robyn "Show Me Love"
60	4	"Alisa Reyes & Tricia Dickson/Wyclef Jean"	December 20, 1997	462	N/A
Green Room-Cast in the Cage: The cast members are "trapped" in a giant cage, thanks to the new studio security guard who doesn't believe them when they tell him they're the stars of the show; Good Burger Mismanagement: When Mr. Bailey (the manager of Good Burger) needs to get a haircut, he chooses Ed (Kel) to be the replacement manager since he has worked at the restaurant longest. While there, he annoys customers, including one little girl (Amanda). She decides to get her father to handle the problem. He turns out to be a large, scary biker! Thankfully, the Mr. Bailey comes back just as the biker asks where the manager is. Ed points out the real one, who suffers a painful beating! Featuring: Former Cast Members Alisa Reyes and Tricia Dickson; Vital Information (from season 3); Have a Nice Day w/ Leroy & Fuzz: Leroy talks about why vegetables irritates him.; C. J. & the Cloudy Knights must get prepared for their performance (featuring Zachary McLemore); Cloudy Knights introduce Musical Guest: Wyclef Jean "We Trying to Stay Alive", "Gone Till November – Remix"; Absent: Danny Tamberelli
61	5	"Dru Hill"	December 27, 1997	463	N/A
Green Room-The Voice Switch: Lori Beth and Kenan's voices get switched! Luckily, Josh thinks of a way to get their own voices back and it's painful.; Miss Piddlin: The people that were supposed to cater the parents of a little girl (Amanda) canceled when the family of her father's boss comes in. so she gets her lunch lady, Miss Piddlin to cater her peas.; Vital Information; Ask Ashley; Miss Fingerly Meets Simon the Sleepwalker: It's time for Miss Fingerly's class, but Simon (Kel) is still sleeping! She tries to ignore him, but he goes about his morning routine, which includes eating breakfast on a student (Christy) and firing arrows into his teacher's stomach.; Ashley reads note from Musical Guest: Dru Hill "5 Steps"
62	6	"Mary J. Blige"	January 3, 1998	465	N/A
Green Room-The Staring Contest: Amanda beats Leon and Kel in a staring contest. When she goes against The Big Ear of Corn, she thinks she's met her match....until she pops him!; Cooking w/ Randy & Campbell: When Randy's fork is stolen, Jack Campbell, Fat Cop arrives to "help". He takes advantage of all of Randy's chocolaty dishes.; Vital Information; What-Everrr: Gina (Amanda) and Jessica (Christy) give Miss Fingerly a makeover.; Toby Braun (Josh) advertises The Board; Pierre Escargot Introduces Musical Guest: Mary J. Blige "Everything"
63	7	"Immature"	January 10, 1998	464	N/A
Green Room-The Meteor: A meteor is headed straight for the Green Room, and the Cast is scared for their lives! The meteor ends up landing on Kevin.; Coach Kreeton is a Substitute and has to deal with a Coach Kreeton voo-doo doll brought in by a student (Leon).; Vital Information; Tater & Family: Tater (Josh) & Family (Lori Beth, Danny, and Amanda) Get Cable installed. Lump Maroon appears as a cousin of the Tater Family.; Everyday French w/ Pierre Escargot; Ask Ashley has one of her letter-writers, Robert Freeman (Danny), actually arrive in her bedroom to deliver his letter, asking her advice on how to get a letter to her more easily.; Pierre Introduces Musical Guest: Immature "Give Up The Ghost"
64	8	"Spice Girls"	January 17, 1998	466	N/A
Green Room-Magic Tricks: Amanda shows off some unique magic tricks, such as turning Kel's $100 bill into an artichoke, making Lori Beth bald, and turning Kevin into a chimpanzee.; Good Burger: Good Shrimp; Vital Information; Jimmy Bond Agent 1/7 meets Hot Toe (Christy) a villain with a molten big toe. Coldfinger returns where he collaborates with Hot Toe, and the two plan to conquer the planet by touching their elemental extremities together. However, the day is saved when their plot simply results in transforming Jimmy into a pig.; Ask Who?: The Cast can't find Amanda when it times for "Ask Ashley" and discover she's sitting in the audience watching the show, or is she?; Show & Tell: Kel brings in The Spice Girls to show and tell.; 'Miss Fingerly's Class intro Musical Guest: Spice Girls "Spice Up Your Life"
65	9	"Missy Elliott"	January 24, 1998	467	N/A
Green Room-The Stuck Treadmill: Josh is trapped on the treadmill. The kids save him by throwing Kevin onto it.; The Wild West Adventures of Superdude: Marc Cant and Penny Lane (now played by Christy) travel to the Old West for a day at the saloon, where some nasty outlaws (Josh and Danny) make trouble. Mark changes into Superdude and sends the jerks packing, but even greater problems arise when Cow Boy (Kel), a half-human, half-bovine criminal, shows up and douses the hero with his milk-filled udders. With the assistance of the Explaining Girl (now played by Amanda, who appears from inside an old barrel) and the Sweaty Woman (who provides a rope), Superdude is able to overcome his weakness and tie Cow Boy's udders together, backing up his milk flow and blowing up the villain in a shower of dairy.; Vital Information; Ask Ashley; Pierre Escargot; Show & Tell: A Monster-ous presentation occurs when a student (Danny) brings in a monster that he found under his bed which attacks the class.; Good Burger Introduces Musical Guest: Missy Elliott "The Rain (Supa Dupa Fly)"
66	10	"Usher"	January 31, 1998	468	2.57
Green Room-Fishin' For Pork: The cast go fishing for some pork.; When a couple (Kenan and Christy) plan to head out for the evening, the husband calls his father to babysit--and the man in question is none other than Coach Kreeton. While attempting to care for his grandson (Leon), the coach's horrible luck continues as he's attacked by a vicious hamster and falls out a window.; Vital Information; Lester Oaks meets Dr. Bynes (the worst Dentist in the World); Bully Academy: Two adult bullies (Danny And Lori Beth) send their sweet & perky little daughter, Jessica (Amanda), to Bully School.; Loud Librarian Introduces Musical Guest: Usher "You Make Me Wanna..."
67	11	"Kirk Franklin & God's Property"	February 7, 1998	469	N/A
Green Room: Danny's got a sore throat. But don't worry-it's Amanda to the rescue! She pulls out his heart and lungs with her bare hands as she searches for his tonsils.; Mavis & Clavis: The old codgers attend their 100th Year Class Reunion and reminisce about a time in their senior year when they fought over a girl (Christy) and do the same thing 100 years later at the reunion! Miss Fingerly, and Bernie Kibbitz also attend; Vital Information; What-Everrr: Gina & Jessica introduce a new segment on the show; Loser of the Week; Detective Dan at the Station: The sketch shows how Detective Dan operates at the police station.; CJ of the Cloudy Knights intro Musical Guest: Kirk Franklin & God's Property "Stomp"
68	12	"Backstreet Boys"	February 21, 1998	470	2.48
Green Room-Christy's Outta Juice: Christy starts falling asleep at extremely inconvenient times so the others have to recharge her.; USS Spaceship: Space Cadets vs. Crouton (Danny); Vital Information; I Luv Lucy: In an I Love Lucy parody, Amanda is Lucy, Victor Cohn-Lopez is Ricky, Kenan is Fred, and Lori Beth is Ethel. In this episode, Lucy buys a new hat, but Ricky says they cannot afford it-so Lucy sticks a trophy on her head instead. While she and Ethel go to get it off, Ricky and Fred intercept a phone call from "Big Hollywood Movie Producer", who wants to make a movie with Ricky! The men go off to prepare and the producer comes in, making himself comfortable. Unfortunately, Lucy and Ethel think he's a burglar, and attack him with fists of fury and kitchen utensils.; Pierre Escargot; Have a Nice Day with Leroy & Fuzz: Leroy talks about why he doesn't like to take baths.; Peter & Flem; Detective Dan and Lump Maroon introduce the Musical Guest: Backstreet Boys "As Long as You Love Me"
69	13	"Boyz II Men"	March 7, 1998	471	N/A
Green Room-Danny's Foot Odor: Danny's foot odor is so bad, anyone who gets near him passes out.; Good Burger: After drinking a giant Good Soda, Ed's gotta go...if you know what that means.; Vital Information; Extremely Loud Librarian: Ms. Hushbaum is being as noisy as ever, all the while demanding that students remain completely silent in the library. The students all vainly attempt to do so as Ms. Hushbaum cooks some bacon, tends to some sheep, engages in a fight with a martial artist, and starts a New Year's Eve party.; What Do You Do?: The panelists to guess the talent of Megan Marples (Amanda) are Connie Muldoon, Detective Dan, Lump Maroon, and Lester Oaks; Construction Worker. Zuzu the Infected Elf reappears, this time played by Leon.; Ms. Fingerly and Her Class (actually Kenan & Kel) Introduce Musical Guest: Boyz II Men "Can't Let Her Go"
70	14	"Destiny's Child"	October 10, 1998	474	2.15
Green Room-Dart Throwing: Lori Beth, Leon, Christy, and Josh have a dart-throwing contest.; Miss Piddlin & Competition: A new lunch lady named Miss Toodles (Christy) comes to Miss Piddlin's lunchroom. Miss Toodles believes in giving children carrots. Soon, Miss Piddlin and Miss Toodles start competing to give the kids their favorite vegetables, and begin beating each other up. Two students (Amanda and Leon) try to teach them that it's possible to eat both vegetables, and while Miss Toodles is receptive to the idea, Miss Piddlin prefers the "diplomacy" of knocking her rival out with a tray of peas.; Vital Information; Principal Pimpell is taking a week off to get his pimple surgically removed, and calls a faculty meeting to decide who the new temporary principal will be. The candidates' attempts to get the position go horribly wrong: Mr. Treble (Zack McLemore) falls out a window; Janitor Gaseous refuses the job because of his hatred of everyone; and Miss Fingerly's song about her fitness for the role is interrupted by Coach Kreeton hitting her with her own guitar. Principal Pimpell decides to have the coach and Tandy Spork engage in an all-out brawl to decide who gets the job, but when both fall out the window, Janitor Gaseous wins by default.; Loud Librarian: Ms. Hushbaum once more continues to run her library while demanding everyone be quiet, while she shaves her face, engages in a phone chat with Miss Fingerly, tests her strength on a carnival device, and fires up a leafblower.; Peter & Flem Introduce Musical Guest: Destiny's Child "No, No, No (Pt. 2)"
71	15	"LL Cool J"	October 17, 1998	475	N/A
Green Room-Everyone's Kevin: Danny has a nightmare that everyone looks and acts like Kevin!; Repairman and Repairboy (Leon); Vital Information; Complaint Department; Pierre Escargot; Miss Fingerly vs. Class Prankster; Vital Introduction Musical Guest: LL Cool J "Father"
72	16	"Jermaine Dupri/Da Brat"	October 24, 1998	477	N/A
Green Room-Habla Espanol: For some reason, everyone is speaking Spanish!; Miss Piddlin on Halloween: Miss Piddlin only serves peas to trick-or-treaters, one of whom (Amanda) is dressed as a giant pea!; Vital Information; Mavis & Clavis: A woman (Lori Beth) is stranded in a lifeboat with Mavis and Clavis as the two old men see this as a problem where they are going to miss The Rosie O'Donnell Show.; Ask Ashley; Squash-Hicks: An acting coach (Oliver Muirhead) continuously interrupts the sketch to improve Josh's and Amanda's acting.; What-Everrr Intro Musical Guests: Jermaine Dupri and Da Brat "The Party Continues"
73	17	"Salt-N-Pepa"	November 7, 1998	473	N/A
Green Room-The Spaceship: Amanda & Leon build a spaceship to go to Jupiter. The older kids laugh at them...until it works!; Coach Kreeton in Home Eccch!: Kreeton is the substitute for home economics after Miss Spork swallows an entire ham in one sitting. The coach's attempts to teach the kids how to make breakfast go horribly wrong when he gets his hand crushed in a waffle iron, falls out a window, and ends up drinking a gallon of hot pepper juice.; Vital Information; Dusty Pants and Nasty Nancy: Dusty Pants and Nasty Nancy's latest feud is interrupted by the Slappy Brothers (Kel and Leon).; Ask Ashley; Miss Piddlin Introduces Musical Guest: Salt-N-Pepa "R U Ready"
74	18	"K-Ci & JoJo"	November 14, 1998	476	N/A
Green Room-Robo Danny: The Cast build a Robo-Danny to replace the real one and he can do everyone's sketches better than them.; What-Everr: The girls have a Hanson Look-alike contest; they meet Lump Maroon and Lester Oaks, Construction Worker. At the end, Hanson cameos as themselves, prompting the girls to chase after them.; Vital Information; Coach Kreeton's Birthday: It's Coach Kreeton's birthday, and the rest of the Dullmont Faculty decide to throw him a surprise party, which gets off to a bad start when the coach immediately falls out a window before the festivities. Things continue to go wrong when Tandy Spork shoves his face into his own cake, and Miss Fingerly's attempts to sing a song ends when Kreeton destroys her guitar. However, the coach is genuinely thrilled to see his present--a functioning antique cannon!...that is, until he sticks his body inside and (literally) loses his head.; Peter and Flem; Have a Nice Day with Leroy & Fuzz: Leroy talks about how babysitters irritate him until his latest babysitter is a cute-looking girl.; Musical guest: K-Ci & JoJo "All My Life"; Note: In reruns, this episode's musical performance was replaced with an extra "Vital Information" sketch, although K-Ci & JoJo remain in the opening credits.
75	19	"Kobe Bryant/Ice Cube"	November 21, 1998	472	N/A
Green Room-Where's Amanda?: The kids search high and low for Amanda. Eventually, they find her in Josh's mouth.; USS Spaceship: The crew faces off against Velcro; Vital Information; What-Everrr: Gina and Jessica meet special guest Kobe Bryant. It's eventually revealed that the girls have a not-so-secret crush on him.; Everyday French with Pierre Escargot; Have a Nice Day with Leroy & Fuzz: Leroy talks about how bedtime irritates him.; Peter & Flem; Principal Pimpell Introduces Musical Guest: Ice Cube "We Be Clubbin'"
76	20	"The Lox"	November 28, 1998	478	N/A
Green Room-Bullies: Some bullies show up in the Green Room and terrorize The Big Ear of Corn. The cast tricks Danny into making fun of the bullies so they'll beat up on him instead.; Detective Dan: Detective Dan crashes Principal Pimpell's class; Vital Information; Cheese Police: Officer Colby appears in Miss Fingerly's class to talk about the horrors of cheese; Pierre Escargot; Toby Braun advertises The Brute; Life with Peter & Flem; Vital Introduction Musical Guest: The Lox "If You Think I'm Jiggy"
77	21	"Sugar Ray"	December 5, 1998	479	N/A
Green Room-The Scarecrow: A very odd scarecrow is in the Green Room to protect the Big Ear of Corn. Amanda, Josh, and Danny tell Lori Beth that there are no crows in the Green Room so she blows it up. Then, Kenan reveals the scarecrow was supposed to protect The Big Ear of Corn from Elvis and professional wrestlers.; I Luv Repairman: Repairman comes to Repair during "I Luv Lucy"; Vital Information; Misfortune Teller: A phony fortune teller (Christy) meets some clients (Josh, Kenan And Amanda) and offers them some fake predictions to scam them.; Miss Fingerly's Birthday: It's Miss Fingerly's birthday! The students prepare to celebrate...but one boy without a head (Danny) scares everyone away!; Ms. Fingerly Knows Best: Miss Fingerly's students act out of control in her classroom. She tries to scare them with old wives' tales, but they do not listen...until all of her threats start coming true! It soon comes to Miss Fingerly committing a show-exclusive old wives' tale in which if you kiss a stuffed monkey, you'll end up attacked by Elvis and professional wrestlers.; Vital Introduction Musical Guest: Sugar Ray "Fly"; (Last episode to feature Lori Beth Denberg) (Last episode to feature Lori Beth Denberg as a Vital Information anchor)
