= Lil' JJ =

American actor and comedian (born 1990)

- Born: James Charles Lewis III; October 31, 1990 (age 35); Little Rock, Arkansas, U.S.
- Education: Arkansas Baptist College
- Occupations: Actor; comedian; rapper
- Years active: 2003–present

James Charles Lewis III (born October 31, 1990), known professionally as Lil' JJ or Big JJ, is an American actor and stand-up comedian, best known for his role as Jordan on the Nickelodeon television series Just Jordan and doing a Vital Information sketch for All That in season ten.

== Life and career ==
Lil' JJ was born in Little Rock, Arkansas. He won BET's comedy talent search Comin' to the Stage.

He became a cast member on Nickelodeon's All That in its 10th season. He guest starred on Nickelodeon's Ned's Declassified School Survival Guide, made a cameo appearance in Chris Brown's music video "Yo (Excuse Me Miss)", in Sean Kingston's music video "Beautiful Girls," Nelly's music video "Stepped on My J'z, Hotstylz' video "Lookin Boy" and Young Gunz' video "Friday Night" . He also appeared with a rap verse on Small Change's music video for "Don't Be Shy".

In 2005, he was slated to starring a family comedy film for Lions Gate Films, titled Kidnapped alongside Bobb'e J. Thompson with filmmaker duo Smith n' Borin slated to directed but it was cancelled for unknown reason.

In 2005 and 2006, he appeared in the Nickelodeon series Romeo! as Romeo's best friend, Jason Brooks, in seasons 2 and 3.

He also played a supporting role in the film Crossover (2006) as a character named "Up."

In 2007, he starred in the Nickelodeon series Just Jordan as Jordan Lewis. In 2008, he, Lily Collins, and Pick Boy appeared together on Nickelodeon for special events. Also, Lil' JJ has appeared in the ABC television series The Secret Life of the American Teenager.

In 2008, he hosted the variety/sketch DVD Almost Grown.

He appeared on the TNT show Men of a Certain Age as DaShaun and on an episode of Chelsea Lately.

He also appeared on the TV One sitcom The Rickey Smiley Show as Brandon.

On April 18, 2013, Lewis became initiated as a member of Omega Psi Phi at Arkansas Baptist College.

He returned to television and became a regular cast member of Wild 'n Out since Season 12 on MTV and VH1.

== Filmography ==
=== Film ===
Year	Title	Role	Notes
2005	Beauty Shop	Willie	
2005	Yours, Mine & Ours	Jimi North	
2006	Crossover	Up	
2009	Janky Promoters	Yung Semore	
2010	Peep Game	Julius	
2011	And They're Off	Julian Rivers	
2013	Tell Me, Tell Me	Himself	Video Short
2015	Brotherly Love	Peanut	
2018	Coins For Christmas	Rex	Television film
2019	Twenty to One	Josh	Television film
2019	The Workout Room	Juice	
2021	Good Intentions	David Banks	

=== Television ===
Year	Title	Role	Notes
2003	Comin' to the Stage	Himself/Contestant	Season 1, Winner (11 episodes)
2005	All That	Himself	Cast member: Season 10
2006	Ned's Declassified School Survival Guide	Morris Adams	Episode: "Music Class & Class Clown"
2007–08	Just Jordan	Jordan James Lewis	Main cast
2009	The Secret Life of the American Teenager	Duncan	Recurring cast: Season 1
2009	The Super Hero Squad Show	Luke Cage	Voice, episode: "A Brat Walks Among Us!"
2009–11	Men of a Certain Age	Dashaun	Main cast
2011	Are We There Yet?	Heezy	Episode: "The Despicable E Episode"
2012–14	The Rickey Smiley Show	Brandon	Guest season 2, recurring cast season 3
2013	The Killing	Alton	Recurring cast: Season 3
2015	Da Jammies	Crazy Craze	Voice, episode: "Old School"
2018–2023	Wild 'n Out	Himself	Season 12-20
2019	Tales	Deshawn	Episode: "I Gave You Power"

=== Music Videos ===
Year	Title	Artist	Notes
2005	Yo (Excuse Me Miss)	Chris Brown	Person on Sidewalk
2007	Beautiful Girls	Sean Kingston	Himself
2008	Stepped on My J'z	Nelly Ft. Ciara & Jermaine Dupri	High School Student

== Discography ==
- 2009: Yo Yo

=== Singles ===
- 2012: "Party Boi"
