= Ryan Coleman =

American actor (born 1991)

- Born: January 14, 1991 (age 34)
- Occupations: Actor; singer; songwriter; producer; comedian
- Instruments: Vocals; guitar
- Years active: 2003–present

Ryan Coleman (born January 14, 1991) is an American actor, producer, singer, songwriter, producer, and comedian from the Nickelodeon series All That. He was originally the runner up in R U All That?: Nickelodeon's Search for the Funniest Kid in America only losing to Christina Kirkman. Ryan replaced Bryan Hearne and Jamie Lynn Spears after she left the show to star on Zoey 101. He finished out Season 9 with the cast and remained a cast member for Season 10 until All That was canceled. After All That ended, Ryan Coleman took a break from acting to focus on school. He graduated from Cesar Chavez High School in Stockton, California, in 2009 and he is working on his music and comedy acts. Ryan Coleman was in a band called Monomaniac from 2012 to 2015 in which he worked with acts such as MGK, Kehlani, Post Malone, Raekwon, KYLE, Towkio and many more. As a guitarist/bassist, he co-wrote the song "Written in Stone" for the Robert Glasper Experiment with Jahi Sundance and collaborated with Jaden Smith heavily on SYRE: The Electric Album. He released his debut solo EP, "Skippers" in October 2018 under the moniker Colt Coleman.

== Monomaniac discography ==
- The Clean EP (2014)
- The Swift EP (TBA)

== Colt Coleman discography ==
- lemmeseethekid (2016) (unreleased)
- Skippers (2018)
- Sweating Bullets (2019)
- Spider Kiss (2020)
