= Giovonnie Samuels =

American actress and voice artist (born 1985)

- Born: Giovonnie Lavette Samuels; November 13, 1985 (age 40); San Diego, California, U.S.
- Occupations: Actress; voice artist
- Years active: 2000–present

Giovonnie Lavette Samuels (born November 13, 1985) is an American actress and voice artist best known for her role as Nia Moseby in The Suite Life of Zack & Cody and for being a series regular on All That from seasons 7–9.

== Life and career ==
Samuels was born Giovonnie Lavette Samuels in San Diego, California on November 13, 1985. She began appearing on All That during 2002, quickly becoming one of the most regularly featured actresses on the show, alongside Jamie Lynn Spears and others. Samuels also appeared in episodes of That's So Raven as Raven's cousin, Betty Jane, and reprised her role again in 2022 in Raven's Home. She also appeared on Boston Public.

Samuels has also done voiceover work for Bill Cosby's animated show, Fatherhood, on Nick at Nite. In 2006, she appeared in the movie Bring It On: All or Nothing, the third Bring It On movie. She has also appeared as an extra in Raven-Symoné's "Backflip" video and in the 2007 film Freedom Writers. In addition, Samuels has appeared in the movie Christmas At Water's Edge. In July 2007, she began appearing as a recurring character on The Suite Life of Zack & Cody as Nia Moseby, niece of Marion Moseby (Samuels was the replacement of Ashley Tisdale, who was absent due to filming High School Musical 2). In 2012, she had a recurring role as Camille in the series Mr. Box Office.

== Filmography ==
=== Film ===
Year	Title	Role	Notes
2005	Dinner for One	SiSi	Short
2006	Be the Man	Alisha	Short
2006	Bring It On: All or Nothing	Kirresha	Film
2007	Freedom Writers	Victoria	
2008	Choices	LaToya	Short
2014	The Slimbones	Slim-E Slimbone - Girl	
2015	Harbinger Down	Ronelle	
2017	Fallen Stars	Tomika	
2020	Cooking Up Christmas	April	Film

=== Television ===
Year	Title	Role	Notes
2001	Boston Public	Macy Walker	"Chapter 18"
2002–04	All That	Various	TV series
2004	Christmas at Water's Edge	April	TV film
2004–05	Fatherhood	Angie Bindlebeep	Main role
2005	That's So Raven	Betty Jane	"Country Cousins: Parts 1 & 2"
2005	Strong Medicine	Renee	"Rhythm of the Heart"
2007–08	The Suite Life of Zack & Cody	Nia	Recurring role
2012–15	Mr. Box Office	Camille	Recurring role
2014	Raising Hope	Regina	"Man's Best Friend"
2014	Monday Afternoon Live	Gio	"Right Time, Wrong Lyrics", "Type Qwerty to Me"
2014	You're the Worst	Brianna	"Keys Open Doors", "PTSD", "Fists and Feet and Stuff"
2018	Henry Danger	Jessie	"Up the Stairs!"
2022	Raven's Home	Betty Jane	"A Country Cousin Christmas"
2024	Quiet on Set: The Dark Side of Kids TV	Herself	3 episodes
