= Kyle Sullivan =

American child actor

- Born: September 24, 1988 (age 37)
- Occupation: Actor
- Years active: 1996–2007; 2024–present

Kyle Sullivan (born September 24, 1988) is an American former child actor, known for appearing on the Nickelodeon TV series All That and the Fox sitcom The War at Home.

== Biography ==
Sullivan played the recurring character Dabney Hooper on Malcolm in the Middle from 2000 to 2003. He has also lent his voice to the characters Danny O'Farrell and Everitt Konquist on the Disney animated series Fillmore! He has guest starred on television programs such as The Secret World of Alex Mack, Seinfeld, The Amanda Show, NewsRadio, Chicago Hope, Mad About You, ER, Scrubs, and Max Keeble's Big Move.

After retiring from acting, Sullivan moved to New York attending Columbia University, studying psychology and earning a Bachelor of Arts (B.A.) in film. He has since worked as a partner for Yitzchak Mirilashvili's venture capital firm Rainfall Ventures.

In the 2024 documentary Quiet on Set: The Dark Side of Kids TV, Sullivan reported that while at a barbecue party hosted by Brian Peck he discovered a painting of a clown holding balloons that Peck claimed to be done by serial killer John Wayne Gacy. Peck reportedly showed the painting off to multiple other people, including the personalized inscription from Gacy to Peck on the back, along with a bundle of handwritten letters sent from Gacy to Peck which Peck kept in his bedside dresser.

Sullivan returned to acting by reprising his role for Dabney Hooper in Malcolm in the Middle: Life's Still Unfair, a revival of the original Malcolm in the Middle TV series.

== Filmography ==
=== Films ===
- Soldier (1998)
- Tuesdays with Morrie (1999)
- Geppetto (2000)
- Max Keeble's Big Move (2001)
- The Master of Disguise (2002)
- All That 10th Anniversary Reunion Special (2005)

=== Television ===
- Kino's Storytime - Himself
- The Secret World of Alex Mack – Ryan (one episode, 1996)
- NewsRadio – Jimmy's Kid ('Rodney') (one episode, 1997)
- Seinfeld – Son (one episode, 1997)
- Chicago Hope – Spencer Clanahan (one episode, 1997)
- Mad About You – The Little Boy (one episode, 1997)
- Promised Land – Connor Hixon (one episode, 1998)
- Good vs Evil – Yoram (one episode, 1999)
- Cover Me: Based on the True Life of an FBI Family – Josh Evans (2000)
- ER – Nicholas Rosato (one episode, 2000)
- The Amanda Show – Himself (two episodes, 2000–2001)
- Malcolm in the Middle – Dabney Hooper (2000–2003)
- Whatever Happened to... Robot Jones? – Socks (2002–2003)
- Fillmore! – Danny O'Farrell / Ken Himmelman / Goon #1 (2002–2004)
- Scrubs – Brian (one episode, 2004)
- All That – Regular Performer / Performer (2002–2005)
- The War at Home – Larry Gold (2005–2007)
- Quiet on Set: The Dark Side of Kids TV – Himself (two episodes, 2024)
- Malcolm in the Middle: Life's Still Unfair – Dabney Hooper (2026)

=== Video games ===
- Rocket Power: Extreme Arcade Games – Sam Dullard (2001)
