= Lisa Foiles =

American actress, presenter, video game journalist, model and YouTuber

- Born: Lisa Renee Foiles; September 29, 1986 (age 39); Portland, Oregon, U.S.
- Occupations: Actress; presenter; video game journalist; model; author; singer
- Years active: 2001–present
- Children: 2
- Website: www.lisafoiles.com

Lisa Renee Foiles Cloninger (born September 29, 1986) is an American actress, presenter, video game journalist, model, author, and singer, who first came to prominence as a cast member of the Nickelodeon series All That, later voicing Jocelyn the Intern in the web series Desk of Death Battle, Death Battle, and DBX.

== Career ==
Foiles was one of the new cast members introduced as part of the 2002 revival of All That, a Nickelodeon sketch comedy show. She appeared on the program for four seasons, until its eventual cancellation in 2005. During this period, she made several appearances on numerous other television series, most notably Even Stevens. In 2003, she guest-starred in "If Boys Were Girls", an episode of the fourth season of Malcolm in the Middle, where she portrayed Mallory, a female version of the titular character (portrayed by Frankie Muniz). Foiles subsequently took a break from acting to complete "college writing courses", with a focus on graphic design and video games.

In 2009, Foiles began writing articles on gaming website Kotaku. She later credited her love of video games with "absolutely [changing] my life", and said many of the acting roles she subsequently received were a direct result of her involvement with the gaming industry. She returned to acting in 2010, portraying 'Trina' in an episode of the American television series Leverage. That same year, she began a career in video game journalism, appearing several times on The Angry Joe Show. She was also the production and graphic designer of several books released by Hungry Girl, two of which entered The New York Times Best Seller list. During this time she also began working with the indie video game company Soma Games as a writer for their new games. In 2011, she appeared in the Disney Digital Network 6-episode miniseries The Street Fighter, and in the game-themed movie Your Friends Close, which was eventually released in 2013. She provided a voice in the Xbox Live Arcade game Ms. Splosion Man (2011).

The following year saw Foiles appear in the Adventures of the League of STEAM episode "Tall Tails", as well as an episode of SMBC Theater, and in the Cracked.com skit "If Movie Hackers Were More Like IT Guys". She starred in the pilot episode of A.J. LoCascio's Spike TV series Yesterday Tonight, a show based on the popular culture of the 1980s and '90s, and appeared as Princess Zelda in The Game Station's live action adaptation of The Legend of Zelda, in the episode "A Fistful of Rupees". Foiles was also a model in the "Girls of Geek" calendar, the proceeds of which were donated to the Breast Cancer Research Foundation. She hosted The Escapist magazine's Top 5 with Lisa Foiles feature, which was published through MSN TV from 2012 until the publisher's closure in 2014. From 2013, she co-hosted a podcast entitled "4RunnersUp", which acted as a companion piece to Top 5. The podcast ran for 18 episodes. She appeared in IGN's 2013 video parody of Macklemore's "Thrift Shop", and voiced a character in the 2013 video game LocoCycle.

Her presenting career began in 2014, as part of the editorial team for GameSpot's coverage of the Electronic Entertainment Expo 2014, which led to her becoming the host of a regular feature on GameSpot's website, Analog. She began hosting the Ultimate Fighting Championship web series UFC Minute in the summer of 2014. She provides the voice of 'Jocelyn the Intern' on ScrewAttack's The Desk of Death Battle web series, which premiered in 2015. She would continue the role 6 years later in Death Battle and its side series DBX, where she is now a co-host in the latter. In 2016, Foiles reunited with her All That colleagues for the relaunch of Nickelodeon's programming block The Splat. She has made frequent appearances at the L.A. Comic Con, formerly known as Stan Lee's Comikaze Expo. The 2015 version of the event saw an extensive reunion of the All That cast. She portrayed Lara Croft in a live action music video for Irish musician Gavin Dunne's 2018 song "Edge of the World". Foiles additionally created the video game website Load Save Point, consisting of game reviews, articles, and videos featuring herself. In 2020, Foiles also became the author of the young adult novel Ash Ridley and the Phoenix.

In 2024, Foiles joined the heavy metal band Von Boldt and currently performs backing vocals for them.

== Personal life ==
Foiles is married to producer Shawn Cloninger, and currently resides in Las Vegas, Nevada. She gave birth to her first child, a daughter in September 2016, and a son in November 2018.

== Filmography ==
| Year | Title | Role | Notes |
|---|---|---|---|
| 2001 | Even Stevens | Carla | 2 episodes |
| 2002 | The Master of Disguise | Lisa (deleted scenes) | |
| 2002–2005, 2020 | All That | Regular Performer | 33 episodes |
| 2003 | Malcolm in the Middle | Mallory | Episode: "If Boys Were Girls" |
| 2005 | All That 10th Anniversary Reunion Special | Various Characters | |
| 2010 | Leverage | Trina | Episode: "The Double Blind Job" |
| 2011 | Ms. Splosion Man | Tutorial Voice | Video game |
| 2011 | The Street Fighter | Camille | |
| 2012 | Shiver | Jennifer | Direct-to-DVD |
| 2012 | The League of S.T.E.A.M. | Shelley the Mermaid | Episode: "Tall Tails" |
| 2013 | Your Friends Close | Aileen | |
| 2013 | LocoCycle | I.R.I.S. | Video game |
| 2015 | Muzzled | Princess | TV series (announced) |
| 2016 | Game Shakers | Teacher | Episode: "The Very Old Finger" |
| 2019 | Wonder Park | Additional Voices | |
| 2021 | Danger Force | Doris | Episode: "Drive Hard" |
| TBA | Pool Party Massacre 2 | | Post-Production |

=== Web ===
| Year | Title | Role |
|---|---|---|
| 2013–2018 | Desk of Death Battle | Jocelyn the Intern |
| 2021–present | DBX | Jocelyn the Intern |
| 2021–present | Death Battle | Jocelyn the Intern |
| 2023–present | Temperamental with Lisa Foiles | Host |

== Awards and nominations ==
- Young Artist Awards

| Year | Nominee / work | Award | Result | Ref. |
|---|---|---|---|---|
| 2003 | Lisa Foiles | Best Performance in a TV Series (Comedy or Drama) – Leading Young Actress | Nominated | |
| 2005 | All That cast | Outstanding Young Ensemble Performers in a TV Series | Nominated | |

- Nickelodeon Kids' Choice Awards

| Year | Nominee / work | Award | Result |
|---|---|---|---|
| 2004 | All That | Favorite TV Show | Won |
