= For Real =

American R&B and soul quartet

- For Real, 1994. L-R: Josina Elder-Epps, LaTanyia Baldwin, Wendi Williams, and Necia Bray-Gates.

Background information
- Genres: R&B, soul
- Years active: 1990–1999, 2018–present
- Labels: A&M; Rowdy; Arista
- Members: Wendi Williams; Latanyia Baldwin; Josina Elder-Epps; Necia Bray-Gates

For Real is an American R&B and soul quartet, that formed in 1990. In the latter part of that decade they were nominated for a Billboard Music Award and a Soul Train Music Award. The group remains active.

== Biography ==
For Real secured their recording contract by accident. "We were picking up our manager from the airport. So we decided to greet him with an acappella song. Someone from A&M Records just happened to be in the airport and heard us perform. Not long after, we were signed," said Latanyia Baldwin.

The band released their debut album, It's a Natural Thang, with production from Brian McKnight on A&M Records in 1994, and it became a critical success, including a rare four stars from Rolling Stone magazine. Their first single, "You Don't Wanna Miss" hit #28 on the Billboard Hot R&B/Hip-Hop Songs chart; the group's second single, "Easy to Love", peaked at #65 on the same chart. The third single, "You Don't Know Nothin'", peaked at #88 on the Billboard Hot 100. The song also peaked at #54 in the UK Singles Chart in July 1995. The album sold over one million copies worldwide, and peaked at #80 on the Billboard 200.

In 1995, the band appeared in Italian Vogue, modeling men's suits. They toured alongside Stevie Wonder, and lent their voices to the Martin Scorsese film project Grace of My Heart. The foursome also forayed into acting with appearances in the film Shake, Rattle and Rock! starring Renée Zellweger and Howie Mandel on Showtime.

They also hit the US Top 20 with the single "Freedom (Theme from Panther)" featuring Aaliyah, TLC, En Vogue, BlackGirl, SWV, and Vanessa Williams from the film Panther. They also recorded a duet with Stevie Wonder called "Stubborn Kind of Fellow", which appeared on the Marvin Gaye tribute album, Inner City Blues: The Music of Marvin Gaye. For Real also recorded songs for the soundtracks of the films Waiting to Exhale and Fled.

Paying homage to the Motown sound with "Like I Do", The Marvelettes-inspired first single and video from their second album, Free (their first for Rowdy Records), they call their sound an answer to "counterfeit R&B". "During the Motown era, artists sang with passion," says Josina, who founded the group back in 1986 in Los Angeles. "That's what's missing from a lot of today's music. But don't worry, we're bringing it back!"

— Josina Elder, LookSmartParents.com

After a label change from A&M to Dallas Austin's Arista imprint Rowdy Records in 1996, For Real released their second album Free. The first two singles were "Like I Do" and "The Saddest Song I Ever Heard". The band also recorded three songs ("I Do", "Born to Love That Boy" and "Unwanted Number") and appeared in the critically acclaimed film Grace of My Heart. The film's soundtrack won a Satellite Award in 1997.

In January 1997, the band won an American Music Award for their work on the Waiting to Exhale soundtrack, with their featured song,"Love Will Be Waiting at Home". In Summer 1997, the group earned a Soul Train Award nomination for Album of the Year (By a Group, Band or Duo) for Free.

In 1999, Wendi Williams lent her voice to the Emmy-winning film Introducing Dorothy Dandridge with Halle Berry, in which Berry plays a singer but Williams is behind her singing voice.

In 2007, Josina Elder-Epps began work on a solo album and released two songs "Watcha Gonna Do" and "Doing It On My Own" to her MySpace page. She began work with producer CoryLavel on an album in 2009.

In 2010, Necia Bray-Gates released her debut solo album "Love Letters" on an independent label.

On July 25, 2018, all four members reunited for a special “Unplugged” show in Los Angeles.

== Discography ==
- It's a Natural Thang (1994)
- Free (1996)

== Awards and nominations ==
Year	Result	Award	Category	Work
1997	Nominated	Billboard Music Award	Best Clip – R&B	"Like I Do"
1998	Nominated	Soul Train Music Award	Album of the Year (By a Group, Band or Duo)	Free
