= Music from The Adventures of Pete & Pete =

Music from the Adventures of Pete & Pete

Studio album by Polaris
- Released: April 6, 1999
- Recorded: 1992–1995
- Genre: Indie rock, jangle pop
- Length: 49:33
- Label: Mezzotint Records
- Producer: Drew Maddy Waters; TBuck Buckland

Professional ratings
Review scores
| Source | Rating |
|---|---|
| Allmusic | 4/5 stars |
| Consequence of Sound | A |
| Punknews.org | 4/5 stars |

Music from the Adventures of Pete & Pete is a studio album by the band Polaris, a one-off project involving members of the late 1980s and early 1990s band Miracle Legion, released on April 6, 1999. It features twelve songs composed by the band between 1992 and 1995 for the Nickelodeon television series, The Adventures of Pete & Pete. The album remains the only full-length release by Polaris.

The album was reissued on April 19, 2015. A deluxe edition was released in September 2020 via Mezzotint Records on vinyl and CD, containing unreleased demos, a lyric sheet and other additional material.

The final track on the album contains a hidden section that begins at 5:29. This hidden track is composed of a number of sound clips concerning the Apollo 11 mission.

== Track listing ==
All tracks written by Mark Mulcahy.

1. "Hey Sandy" – 2:36
2. "She Is Staggering" – 3:08
3. "Waiting for October" – 3:52
4. "Saturnine" – 3:13
5. "Everywhere" – 3:37
6. "Ivy Boy" – 3:51
7. "Summerbaby" – 3:24
8. "Coronado II" – 4:19
9. "Ashamed of the Story I Told" – 4:29
10. "As Usual" – 5:22
11. "Recently" – 2:40
12. "The Monster's Loose" – 9:01

The 2020 "21st Century Edition" contains:

Side A:

1. Hey Sandy
2. She is Staggering
3. Waiting For October
4. As Usual
5. Everywhere
6. Ivy Boy

Side B:

1. Summerbaby
2. Coronado II
3. Ashamed Of The Story I Told
4. Saturnine
5. Recently
6. The Monster's Loose

CD Tracklist:

1. The Monsters Loose
2. CORONADO II
3. Holy Holly
4. Waiting for October
5. 21st Century Space Walk
6. Hey Sandy
7. As Usual
8. Ashamed of the Story I told
9. Recently
10. Waiting for October electric guitar
11. Saturnine instrumental
12. As Usual w/drums
13. Waiting for October acoustic instrumental
14. Coronado II instrumental
15. Look at the Rocket Go!

== Personnel ==
=== Polaris ===
- Muggy – vocals and guitar
- Jersey – bass
- Harris Polaris – drums

=== Additional performers ===
- Tom Chase – organ and piano
- Buel Thomas – trumpet
- Dennis Kelly – pedal steel guitar
- Joyce Raskin – vocals on "Ashamed of the Story I Told"
