= Surprise Surprise Surprise =

Studio album by Miracle Legion
- Released: 8 September 1987
- Length: 46:34
- Label: Rough Trade
- Producer: Jon Russell, Miracle Legion

Miracle Legion chronology
The Backyard (1984)	Surprise Surprise Surprise (1987)	Me and Mr. Ray (1989)

Professional ratings
Review scores
Source	Rating
AllMusic	3/5 stars
Consequence of Sound	A−

Surprise Surprise Surprise is the first full-length album by Miracle Legion, released in 1987.

== Release ==
The 10 song LP Surprise Surprise Surprise was released under Rough Trade Records in 1987. It was released on vinyl, cassette and in Japan, CD. The cassette and CD contain bonus tracks Will You Wait? and a cover of "Academy Fight Song" by Mission of Burma.

== Track listing ==
All songs written by Mark Mulcahy and Ray Neal, except where noted

No.	Title	Length
1.	"Mr. Mingo"	3:18
2.	"All for the Best"	5:10
3.	"Paradise"	3:07
4.	"Truly"	5:44
5.	"Storyteller"	5:43
6.	"Country Boy"	4:47
7.	"Crooked Path" (Mulcahy/Neal/Jeff Wiederschall)	3:12
8.	"Everyone in Heaven"	3:10
9.	"Wonderment" (Mulcahy/Neal/Wiederschall)	3:56
10.	"Little Man" (Mulcahy/Neal/Wiederschall)	4:40

== Personnel ==
- Joel Potocsky – bass guitar
- Mark Mulcahy – vocals
- Jeff Wiederschall – drums
- Ray Neal – guitar
