= Jude Ciccolella =

American actor

- Born: Richard Jude Ciccolella; November 30, 1947 (age 78); Burlington, Vermont, U.S.
- Education: Brown University (BA); Temple University (MFA)
- Occupation: Actor
- Years active: 1985–present
- Spouse: Sylva Kelegian (m. 1997)

Richard Jude Ciccolella (/ˈtʃɪkəlɛlə/; born November 30, 1947) is an American actor. He is best known for playing Mike Novick in the television series 24 from 2001 to 2006.

== Life and career ==
Ciccolella was born in Burlington, Vermont, and spent his formative years in Albany, New York. He is of Italian descent. In 1969, he graduated from Brown University, where he acted in student productions. He studied at Temple University, earning a Master of Fine Arts degree in theatre.

His film debut was in the 1992 James Foley and David Mamet film Glengarry Glen Ross, as a detective in the scene where Al Pacino is having an argument with Kevin Spacey about the "six thousand dollars" owed to him. His other early film roles include Mert in The Shawshank Redemption (1994), Jerry in Boys on the Side (1995), Lieutenant Wilson in Night Falls on Manhattan (1996), Romulan Commander Suran in Star Trek: Nemesis (2002), the private eye in Down with Love (2003), Karl Iverson in The Terminal (2004), and David Donovan in The Manchurian Candidate (2004). He also appeared as Lt. Liebowitz in Sin City (2005), a role he reprised nine years later for Sin City: A Dame to Kill For (2014).

Ciccolella's first television appearance was in the 1993 The Adventures of Pete & Pete episode "Tool and Die", as shop class teacher Mr. Slurm, whose missing left hand stirs nothing but hearsay and rumors. In 2001, Ciccolella appeared in a recurring guest role on 24 during the show's first and second seasons (2001–2003). He played Mike Novick, Chief of Staff to President David Palmer (Dennis Haysbert). In 2005, he guest starred as Principal Raymond on Everybody Hates Chris; however, he was replaced upon reprising his role as Mike Novick in the fourth season of 24 (2005), returning for the last 8 episodes. Mike had become an advisor to Acting President Charles Logan (Gregory Itzin), who had taken over after President John Keeler (Geoff Pierson) was critically injured. He continued this role in the show's fifth season (2006), but did not appear in the sixth season. He has also guest starred on the shows Law & Order, NYPD Blue, CSI: NY and ER.

In 2007, he guest-starred on NBC freshman drama, Life; and played Kenny in the film The Wager. He also portrayed Phillip Davenport, the fictional Secretary of the Navy, on the 6th season of the CBS show NCIS in 2008, and reprised the role two years later for the last episode of the 8th season.

In the "Supporting Players" featurette on the 24 season 5 DVD, actress Jean Smart reveals that Ciccolella is a folk singer.

== Filmography ==
=== Film ===
Year	Title	Role	Notes
1985	Insignificance	Gaffer	
1988	Shakedown	Patrick O'Leary	
1992	Glengarry Glen Ross	Detective Baylen	
1994	The Shawshank Redemption	Guard Mert	
1995	Boys on the Side	Jerry	
1995	Mad Love	Richard Roberts	
1997	Night Falls on Manhattan	Lieutenant Wilson	
1998	Beloved	Schoolteacher	
1999	Flawless	Detective Noonan	
2002	Star Trek: Nemesis	Cdr. Suran	
2002	High Crimes	Col. Farrell	
2003	Down With Love	McNulty	
2003	Head of State	Mr. Earl	
2003	Daredevil	Robert McKensie	Director's cut version
2004	The Terminal	Karl Iverson	
2004	The Manchurian Candidate	David Donovan	
2004	Million Dollar Baby	Hogan	
2005	Sin City	Lt. Liebowitz	
2006	World Trade Center	Inspector Fields	
2007	Premonition	Father Kennedy	
2008	Julia	Nick	
2012	The Babymakers	Coach Stubbs	
2014	Sin City: A Dame to Kill For	Lt. Liebowitz	

=== Television ===
Year	Title	Role	Notes
1986	The Equalizer	Joe	Episode: "Back Home"
1992	Law & Order	Morgan	Episode: "Blood Is Thicker" (S2.E14)
1993	The Adventures of Pete & Pete	Mr. Slurm	Episode: "Tool and Die" (S1.E5)
1994	Law & Order	Captain Dennis Burnett	Episode: "Competence" (S5.E6)
1995–1996	New York Undercover	ATF Agent Weston/Robert Olsen	2 episodes
1997	Law & Order	Allen Sherick	Episode: "Turnaround" (S7.16)
1999	Viper	Marcus White	Episode: "Split Decision" (S4.E21-22)
2000	Walker, Texas Ranger	Samuel Becker	Episode: "Thunderhawk" (S8.E15)
2001–2006	24	Mike Novick	59 episodes; Nominated — 2003 Screen Actors Guild Award for Outstanding Performance by an Ensemble in a Drama Series; Nominated — 2007 Screen Actors Guild Award for Outstanding Performance by an Ensemble in a Drama Series
2005–2006	Everybody Hates Chris	Dr. Raymond	4 episodes
2007	Life	Professor Luke Dujardin	Episode: "Dig a Hole"
2008–2011	NCIS	Phillip Davenport	4 episodes
2008	Prison Break	Howard Scuderi	3 episodes
2009	Monk	Warden Tom Bennet	1 episode
2010	The Mentalist	Freddy Fitch	1 episode
2011	House M.D.	Mendelson	Episode: "Twenty Vicodin" (S8.E1)
2011	Burn Notice	Connor Johnson (Coco)	Episode: "A Dark Road" (S3.E18)
2012	Touch	Arnie	3 episodes
2013	Body of Proof	Det. Mo Childs	Episode: "Committed" (S3.E10)
2014	Major Crimes	Ed Winslow	Episode: "Trial By Fire" (S3.E14)
2015	Beautiful and Twisted	Detective Dalton	TV movie. on Lifetime
2016	NCIS: New Orleans	Former Army Col. David Peterson	Episode: "Collateral Damage" (S2.E21)
2018	Lethal Weapon	Frankie Kelso	Episode: "Frankie Comes to Hollywood" (S2.E18)
2019	Law & Order: Special Victims Unit	Edgar Noone	Episode: “Dear Ben” (S20.E12)
