= List of The Adventures of Pete & Pete episodes =

The following is a list of episodes from the Nickelodeon television series, The Adventures of Pete & Pete.

The series began on November 28, 1993, and ended on April 1, 1996. A total of 34 episodes aired as well as 5 half-hour specials and 26 shorts. Currently, the first two seasons are available on DVD. The third season was planned for release but has been removed from Paramount's release schedule.

== Series overview ==
Season	Episodes	Originally released	
Season	Episodes	First released	Last released
Specials	5	February 9, 1991	January 2, 1993
1	8	November 28, 1993	January 16, 1994
2	13	September 4, 1994	December 4, 1994
3	13	October 1, 1995	April 1, 1996

== Shorts (1989-1990) ==
(Note: The original broadcast order is not known. However, "What Would You Do for a Dollar?" and "Freeze Tag" were the two earliest.)

1. "What Would You Do for a Dollar? " — The Petes, Ellen, and a kid named Carl Slurm answer the title question. (Another character named Mr. Slurm would appear in "Tool and Die" and "Road Warrior.")
2. "Freeze Tag" — Little Pete stays frozen after a night game of stocking freeze tag.
3. "The Burping Room" — Dad, sick of Little Pete's constant burping, builds a special soundproof room.
4. "Pete-Less" — Ellen is hurt when Big Pete insults her valentine.
5. "Czechoslovakia" — The Petes convince their dad to drive them to Czechoslovakia for secret spy work.
6. "Pete's Theory" — Little Pete is convinced that Santa Claus was the first man to swim the English Channel.
7. "X-Mas Eve" — The Petes watch Dad open his present (a glow-in-the-dark discus) early and play with it all night.
8. "The Dot" — Ellen is in tears after being yelled at by Mr. Putley, the marching band instructor. (Themes revisited in "Day of the Dot.")
9. "The Big Race" — Mr. Wrigley and Mr. Hickle have a race. (Recreated in "Apocalypse Pete.")
10. "Revenge of the Petes" — Artie battles the bully known as Hathead.
11. "Mom's Plate" — A brief history of the metal plate in Mom's head.
12. "Route 34" — Big Pete gets a horrible summer job mowing the grass along Route 34.
13. "Artie, the Strongest Man... in the World!" — A little bit about the Petes' personal superhero.
14. "Halloween" — Hathead returns to smash pumpkins, but is later foiled by Little Pete's superhero, Artie. (Themes revisited in "Halloweenie.")
15. "X-Ray Man" — Little Pete gains x-ray vision after staring into a lunar eclipse.
16. "The Punishment" — Dad punishes Little Pete for waxing the lawn. (Themes revisited in "Grounded for Life.")
17. "The Launch" — The Petes and Ellen send a rocket into space.
18. "Flossing" — The Petes use a new video camera to record their dad as he flosses.
19. "Licking" — The Petes hid under the bed.
20. "Hathead" — The story of Hathead.
21. "Crack the Whip" — A game of Crack the Whip.
22. "Dr. Pratt" — Dr. Pratt ruins dads lawn.
23. "Merry Christmas" — Ellen and the Petes go Caroling.
24. "Artie" — More about Artie.

=== Home video shorts ===
1. "The Artie Workout" — Self-explanatory. Created for the home video release "Classic Petes."
2. "StareMaster" — Little Pete offers tips for winning a staring contest, (see "When Petes Collide"). In the end, the viewer gets to go up against Little Pete. Made for the home video release "School Dazed."

== Episodes ==
=== Specials (1991–93) ===
- These episodes were produced prior to the first season. When they originally aired, the opening credits were narrated by the character Ellen. As part of the first season, these episodes were edited. Several minutes of footage were removed, the opening and closing credits were replaced with the standard first season credits (depicting Polaris performing in a front lawn setting, intercut with clips from various episodes), and the licensed music was replaced with the songs within the show's stock music library. All subsequent re-runs and releases have been the shorter "normalized" versions.

No.	Title	Directed by	Written by	Original release date
1	"Valentine's Day Massacre"	Katherine Dieckmann	Will McRobb	February 9, 1991
Big Pete and the school's stadium line painter, Mr. Beverly (whose squid, Edna, the school mascot, Pete has just accidentally killed), vie for the love of the math teacher (Ms. Fingerwood). However, Openface (one of Big Pete's arch-enemies) tries to get the upper hand in a quest for the missing squid and helps Mr. Beverly with his love for Ms. Fingerwood. He tries to get Ellen to exploit the Petes by revealing the secret of what really happened to Edna. Mr. Beverly is played by Richard Edson.
2	"What We Did On Our Summer Vacation"	Katherine Dieckmann	Will McRobb	September 8, 1991
After the Petes and Ellen unintentionally drive Mr. Tastee (the local ice-cream man) out of town by trying to find out about his personal life, they start a hunt to find him and bring him back as the summer comes to a close. Note: The original (non-series) version of this episode had music done by R.E.M., Baby Flamehead, Poi Dog Pondering, Ministry, Jody Grind, and Shackwacky. Michael Stipe of R.E.M. appears as the ice cream man "Captain Scrummy" in the beach scene. Kate Pierson of The B-52's appears as Mrs. Van Devere.
3	"Space, Geeks, and Johnny Unitas"	Katherine Dieckmann	Will McRobb	June 17, 1992
Big Pete and Ellen work on a science project to determine whether unearthly life exists on Earth and inadvertently make a new friend. Pete becomes obsessed with football hero Johnny Unitas and one life-changing play (The Greatest Game Ever Played), while Ellen discovers that some things are best left unrevealed.
4	"Apocalypse Pete"	Katherine Dieckmann	Will McRobb	October 8, 1992
The Petes' father, Don Wrigley, and Ellen's father, Phil Hickle (Steve Buscemi), start a prank war, which helps Little Pete and his father get closer while tearing Big Pete and Ellen apart. Based on the short entitled "The Big Race."
5	"New Year's Pete"	Adam Bernstein	Will McRobb	January 2, 1993
Little Pete reflects on a year in which he ultimately failed to achieve his New Year's Resolution of changing the world. Note: This episode is narrated by Little Pete instead of Big Pete. Featuring Deborah Harry as the second land mine customer and Vincent Pastore as the professional bowling scout. It was long rumored that this episode contained a cameo by Hunter S. Thompson because of an extra with a similar name.

=== Season 1 (1993–94) ===
- The opening credits for Season 1 consisted of many scenes, such as Little Pete sticking his head out of a car window, a closeup of Big Pete's face, Mom running across the field, shot of Mom's Plate, Dad looking all around, Ellen looking down, and looking up smiling, Artie standing up really high on a goalpost, and a shot of Petunia.

No. overall	No. in season	Title	Directed by	Written by	Original release date
1	1	"King of the Road"	Peter Lauer	Will McRobb	November 28, 1993
On a family trip to the Hoover Dam, Don is determined to defend his title of "King of the Road" from a challenging family, but lengthy bathroom breaks and a lack of family cohesion threaten his success.
2	2	"Day of the Dot"	Katherine Dieckmann	Will McRobb & Chris Viscardi & Joe Stillman	December 5, 1993
When Ellen is selected to dot the "i" in "Squid" in the regional high school marching band competition, Big Pete becomes jealous of her newfound closeness with her band partner, James Markle Jr. (nephew of their band director). Meanwhile, Little Pete tries to stop an interminable bus ride by reuniting lovelorn bus driver Stu Benedict with his former sweet-heart, Sally Knorp.
3	3	"The Nightcrawlers"	Katherine Dieckmann	Chris Viscardi	December 12, 1993
Little Pete and his friends aim to overthrow the International Adult Conspiracy's reign over bedtimes by staying up for eleven consecutive nights and thus breaking the world record.
4	4	"Rangeboy"	Chris Koch	Rick Groel & Will McRobb	December 19, 1993
Embarrassed to be working at his father's driving range, Big Pete hides his identity by dressing as the sort of bear that used to inhabit the area where the range is. Meanwhile, Little Pete helps Artie by perfecting his shot for the longball competition.
5	5	"Tool and Die"	Peter Lauer	Ken Scarborough & Chris Viscardi	December 26, 1993
Big Pete is put in shop class, much to his displeasure. His teacher, Mr. Slurm, assigns him to work on a mysterious "special project" with the bully "Endless" Mike Hellstrom.
6	6	"Don't Tread on Pete"	Phil Morrison	Tom Hertz & Will McRobb & Chris Viscardi	January 2, 1994
While Big Pete engages in a struggle against time to study for a test on the American Revolutionary War (with the fear that failing would cause him to wind up like the school's janitor, rumored to have failed the same test years before), Little Pete leads his gym class to try to beat his teacher's intramural dodgeball team. Note: The episode's title is a reference of the slogan, "Don't Tread on Me", as featured on the Gadsden flag (which was used during the Revolutionary War).
7	7	"When Petes Collide"	Tony Jacobs	Joe Stillman	January 9, 1994
The Petes compete for Dad's affections as he prepares to pass down "Rolling Thunder", a bowling ball that apparently has mystical powers. Things get even more complicated when the Petes' grandfather (William Hickey) visits to oversee the process.
8	8	"Hard Day's Pete"	B.K. Small	Will McRobb & Chris Viscardi	January 16, 1994
On his way to school, Little Pete happens upon a garage band playing his newfound favorite song: "Summerbaby" by Polaris. When he returns later that day, all traces of the band have vanished. Pete starts his own band to try to remember the tune before it forever slips his mind. Note: The episode's title is a parody of The Beatles album A Hard Day's Night.

=== Season 2 (1994) ===
- The opening credits for Season 2 consisted of many scenes, such as Little Pete riding a lawn mower, a shot of Big Pete looking up, Mom running in the wheatfield, a shot of Mom's Plate, Dad drinking coffee, Ellen holding flags, Artie leaping on the bowling ball, and a shot of Petunia.

No. overall	No. in season	Title	Directed by	Written by	Original release date
9	1	"Grounded for Life"	Don Pietra	Michael Memoli	September 4, 1994
Little Pete destroys Dad's lawn in an experiment gone awry, and after being caught making a break for the Canadian border is grounded for a month and is forced to tunnel his way out of the house past a state-of-the-art security system in order to make it to the celebrations of his favorite holiday, the Fourth of July. During his escape attempt Pete meets Nona F. Mecklenberg (Michelle Trachtenberg), who has just moved to Wellsville and is trying to get her dog to pee.
10	2	"Field of Pete"	Chris Koch	Robert Mittenthal	September 11, 1994
Big Pete's baseball team (The Prosthetics) goes on a winning streak due to Little Pete's incredible knack for making distracting comments. Coach Ed Narrins' win-or-die attitude, a super-cold slushy drink called the Orange Lazarus, and Little Pete's dirty tactics threaten to destroy baseball forever, and Big Pete must choose between ultimate glory and the personal integrity of the sport he loves. Note: The episode's title is a parody of 1989 sports fantasy film, Field of Dreams.
11	3	"The Call"	Peter Lauer	Tom Hill	September 18, 1994
For twenty-seven years, Wellsville has been gripped by the terror of a pay phone that has never stopped ringing. On the hottest day of the summer, Little Pete decides to answer the phone while Big Pete decides to figure out who the call is for.
12	4	"The Big Quiet"	Tony Jacobs	Sam Johnson & Chris Marcil	September 25, 1994
Little Pete copes with the death of his pet lizard Gary while Big Pete struggles to improve his relationship with Dad in hopes of avoiding a lifetime of awkward conversations. Little Pete ends up saving the day by going on his WART radio to announce the passing of Gary and encourages others to take a brief silence for it.
13	5	"Time Tunnel"	Katherine Dieckmann	Will McRobb	October 2, 1994
On the day that Daylight Saving Time ends in the fall, the Petes traditionally celebrate the extra hour by taking advantage of the "time warp" to do something momentous. This year, however, Big Pete is overcome by hormones and asks Ellen out on an official date. He enlists the help of his nemesis, "Endless" Mike Hellstrom, to help the date go smoothly. Mike lends Big Pete his customized Ford Mustang convertible and teaches him the nuances of dating. After the date becomes a disaster, Big Pete must use the power of the "time warp" to repair his friendship with Ellen. Little Pete gets his revenge on Endless Mike for humiliating his brother by showing everyone home movies of him as a toddler. Humiliated beyond belief, Mike chases after him in his car.
14	6	"Halloweenie"	Peter Lauer	Chris Viscardi	October 9, 1994
Little Pete decides to enter the annals of history by breaking the record for most houses visited on Halloween and tries to enlist the help of Big Pete. Big Pete is torn between his loyalty to his brother and the coming-of-age & abandonment of the childhood ritual of trick-or-treating. He must decide whether to face the ridicule of his peers and go trick-or-treating or face the wrath of the notorious "Pumpkin Eaters", a group of vandals who terrorize neighborhood "Halloweenies."
15	7	"Inspector 34"	Maggie Greenwald	Joe Stillman	October 16, 1994
Little Pete finds his guardian angel, Inspector 34, who inspects the Kreb of the Loom underwear worn by the Wrigleys and their friends. While Inspector 34 recruits Little Pete to be an inspector, Pete shows him how to interact with normal people and have fun. While the citizens of Wellsville try to embrace the perfection that Inspector 34 lives by, Inspector 34 lets his tendency towards perfection and his hormones go to his head. When Little Pete sees how the desire for perfection is making his friends and family miserable he decides to help everyone, including Inspector 34, find a way to live in moderation between perfection and abnormality.
16	8	"X = Why?"	Katherine Dieckmann	Katherine Dieckmann	October 23, 1994
After getting fed up with algebra word problems, Ellen asks the question high school teachers dread most: "Why (do we have to know this)?" Her inquiry spreads like wildfire throughout the school and soon students are rebelling against the textbook knowledge forced upon them in every class. However, Ellen realizes that things have gone too far when math teacher Ms. Fingerwood disappears as she desperately tries to set things right.
17	9	"On Golden Pete"	Don Pietra	Robert Mittenthal, Will McRobb, & Chris Viscardi	November 6, 1994
The Wrigley family takes a fishing trip, and Big Pete contemplates mortality while Dad tries to catch a legendary fish named Bob. Also, after realizing the cruel fate that could happen to Bob, Big Pete tries to sabotage Dad's attempts on making the catch. Note: The episode's title is a parody of Ernest Thompson play and 1981 drama film, On Golden Pond.
18	10	"Farewell, My Little Viking: Part 1"	Tony Jacobs	Will McRobb & Joe Stillman and Sam Johnson & Chris Marcil	November 13, 1994
The end of Artie's influence over Wellsville comes in two parts. Supervillain John McFlemp (James Rebhorn), head of the International Adult Conspiracy, concocts a dastardly plan to rid the Wellsville parents of the nuisance that is Artie forever, and threatens to destroy all that is unique about the kids of Wellsville. McFlemp extorts Dad and convinces him to get rid of Artie. Meanwhile, Little Pete must deal with his enemy, a school bully named Papercut after defying him by throwing scissors in a game of Rock-Paper-Scissors.
19	11	"Farewell, My Little Viking: Part 2"	Tony Jacobs	Will McRobb & Joe Stillman and Sam Johnson & Chris Marcil	November 20, 1994
The Petes, Ellen, and Little Pete's various friends start a campaign to find Artie, who disappears in Dad's car after a disheartening speech from Don (Dad). The campaign consists of a Bat-Signal-esque likeness of Artie's face, t-shirts, and various souvenir items. At home, Joyce sets Don straight when she sees how depressed Little Pete is and realizes his mistake of letting McFlemp manipulate him in the first place. Don joins in on the search and manages to find Artie. He is ultimately brought back to Wellsville, only to find Little Pete standing up to Papercut on his own, demonstrating that Artie's protective influence is no longer needed. A tearful departure follows as Artie leaves in search of another little boy in need of a superhero.
20	12	"Yellow Fever"	Damon Santostefano	Joe Stillman	November 27, 1994
Big Pete is stuck on a school bus departing for the deepest, darkest parts of the human psyche, as well as the county milk museum. During the bus ride, Pete befriends people he never thought he'd associate with, succumbs to the temptations of bullying and is forced to cope with his actions and repent. Features a young Rick Faugno as a high-school kid who dreams of singing at weddings and Bar Mitzvahs.
21	13	"Sick Day"	Maggie Greenwald	Michael Rubiner	December 4, 1994
Little Pete decides to fake food poisoning in order to avoid another mind-numbing day at school during the stretch between winter and spring break. In an adventure that leads him from home to school and the various sites around Wellsville, Little Pete sees a classmate of his in a new light, gets a cereal marshmallow-likeness of President Eisenhower stuck in his nose and gains a new perspective on the world that can only be appreciated on a sick day.

=== Season 3 (1995–96) ===
*In season three, the focus of the series began skewing somewhat towards Little Pete; notably, Little Pete even narrates an episode for the first time since the special "New Year's Pete".

- The opening credits for the third and final season consisted of many scenes, such as Little Pete sliding on the floor, Big Pete wearing a sombrero, which has "PEDRO" written on it, Mom having a bucket on her head, a shot of Mom's Plate, Dad blowing off his flames, Ellen looking out in the window, Nona dancing, and a shot of Petunia.

No. overall	No. in season	Title	Directed by	Written by	Original release date
22	1	"35 Hours"	Don Pietra	Rob Des Hotel & Dean Batali	October 1, 1995
The Petes are entrusted with the key to the house while Mom and Dad go away on a trip for two days. Just when it looks like their plan to stage the ultimate bicycle race around the house (The Wrigley 500) is about to materialize, Big Pete is struck by hormones and instead chooses to vie for the attention of his latest sweet-heart, Margie Corsall. Little Pete sells the house in retaliation to the nicest family ever, the Krechmars. Big Pete tries to set things right with his brother and they attempt to regain ownership of the house before Mom and Dad return. Note: Patty Hearst, who became a well known public figure after being kidnapped, appears in this episode as Mrs. Krechmar.
23	2	"The Trouble with Teddy"	Maggie Greenwald	Holly Morgan	October 8, 1995
Big Pete offers to let his friend Teddy stay over while his parents are away and begins to notice just how many annoying habits Teddy has. Meanwhile, Little Pete tries to get in touch with the land.
24	3	"The Good, the Bad and the Lucky"	Atticus Chance	Chris Viscardi	October 15, 1995
Little Pete's lucky penny runs out of luck one day, so he, Nona, Monica, and Wayne set out on a journey to recharge it by letting the Midnight Express run over it. Pit Stain, Little Pete's arch nemesis, and his henchmen (Hair Net & Drawstring) catches on and tails them, and Pete is forced to battle Pit Stain without the power of his lucky penny. Note: The episode's title is a parody of the 1966 Spaghetti Western film, The Good, the Bad and the Ugly.
25	4	"Splashdown!"	Peter Lauer	Will McRobb	October 22, 1995
Big Pete tries to obtain the coveted position of Senior Lifeguard while Little Pete fights to abolish the hated Adult Swim. Big Pete is forced to choose between the power of the lifeguard chair and his friendship with his brother.
26	5	"Dance Fever"	Alison Maclean	Joe Stillman	November 5, 1995
Little Pete attends his first school dance and Big Pete develops a crush on the guitarist of the hired band (Luscious Jackson). Pit Stain learns of Little Pete's fear of dancing and tries to exploit it, while Nona tries to avoid the embarrassment of dancing with her "Pop," (Iggy Pop).
27	6	"Allnighter"	Katherine Dieckmann	Tami Yellin & Todd Yellin	November 23, 1995
Little Pete, Monica, and Wayne get trapped in the school after it closes and are stuck for the night. They attempt to elude a fearsome school legend, whom they are eventually forced to confront.
28	7	"Road Warrior"	Nik Miltiadis	Alan Swayze, Joe Stillman, Will McRobb, & Chris Viscardi	November 30, 1995
Big Pete and his friends reach the age of responsibility and take Driver's Ed from Mr. Slurm, the shop teacher.
29	8	"Pinned!"	Chris Koch	William Tinston	December 7, 1995
Big Pete tries to get a varsity letter and climb to the top of the social ladder the easy way by joining the wrestling team, and finds that individual sports are not a cakewalk. He trains for a confrontation at the big match with "Endless" Mike Hellstrom, and is coached by Ellen, a huge wrestling fan. However, Ellen's efforts to train Big Pete are threatened by the school's wrestling coach, Beano Glattner.
30	9	"'O Christmas Pete"	Damon Santostefano	Rob Des Hotel & Dean Batali	December 14, 1995
Little Pete prolongs Christmas for as long as possible after the holiday's end, in an attempt to keep the neighborhood in a constant aura of yuletide joy. His efforts are threatened by a bitter garbage man who enjoys destroying Christmas trees and the holiday spirit they represent. Big Pete is forced to choose either to help his brother prolong Christmas or put an end to it.
31	10	"Das Bus"	Don Pietra	Lawrence Carvey, Will McRobb, Chris Viscardi & Joe Stillman	December 21, 1995
Big Pete chooses to become school bus driver Stu Benedict's apprentice for the week to be near Penelope Ghiruto (Selma Blair), while Ellen stocks vending machines. Note: The episode's title is a parody of 1981 submarine drama film, Das Boot. The same title was later reused for an episode of The Simpsons.
32	11	"Saturday"	Chris Koch	Will McRobb, Chris Viscardi, Joe Stillman & David Hemingson	December 28, 1995
Big Pete, Ellen, Wayne, Monica, and Stu Benedict make their way through a not-so-typical Saturday in Wellsville. Big Pete tries talking to Barber Dan (J.K. Simmons) while getting a haircut (with Little Pete helping his brother), Wayne tries his new sneakers out, Monica becomes a Kunoichi, Ellen serves pizza, and Stu battles an endless traffic signal.
33	12	"Crisis in the Love Zone"	Katherine Dieckmann	M.F. Stern & David Hemingson	March 23, 1996
Spring fever hits Wellsville hard and everyone begins dropping like flies. Big Pete is smitten by a star member of the tennis team, Ellen realizes her true feelings for him, and Pit Stain is head over heels for Nona. Little Pete falls for Eunice Puell, the mail lady, despite his most sincere efforts to avoid love through his mantra, "Love bites." As such, it's up to Nona to snap her friend out of his heartfelt state. Narrated by Little Pete and Nona.
34	13	"Last Laugh"	Chris Koch	Magda Liolis, Will McRobb, Chris Viscardi & Joe Stillman	April 1, 1996
Little Pete cooks up his biggest April Fool's prank ever for the upcoming Johnny Hygiene assembly, while Principal Ken Schwinger (Adam West) enlists the help of Pit Stain, Hair Net and Nightbrace to stop him.
