= Polaris (American band) =

American rock band

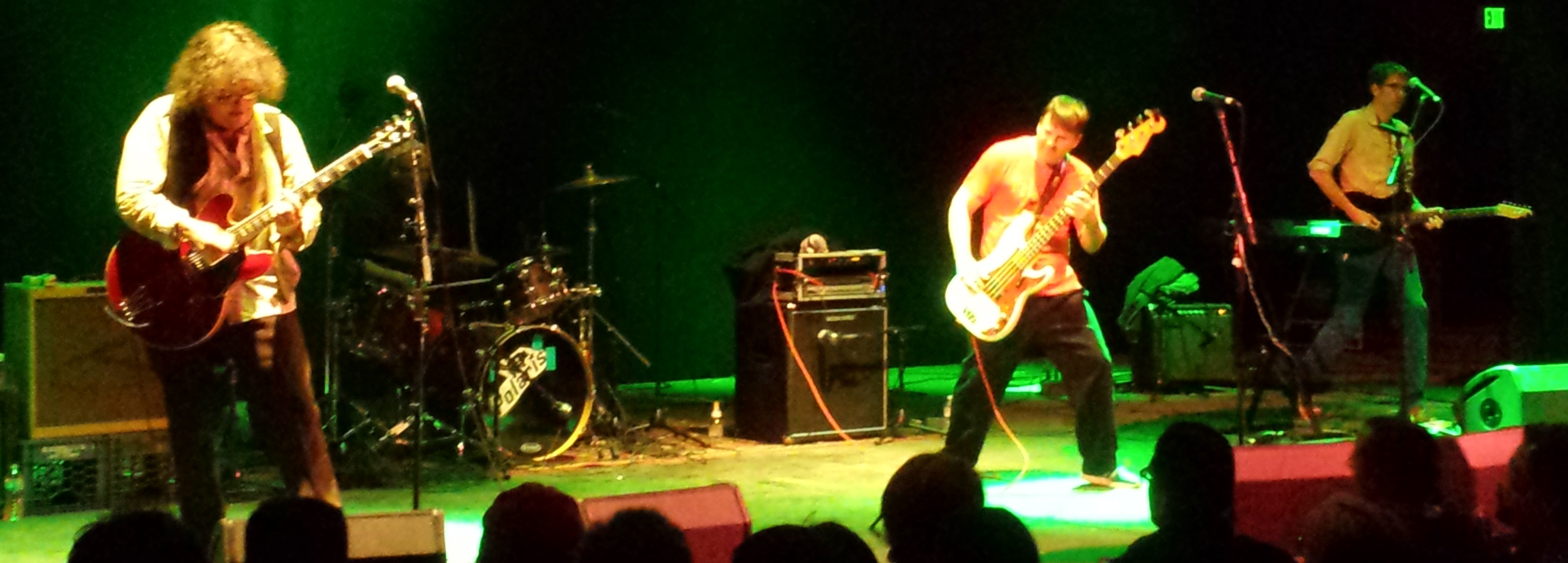
- Polaris in concert at College Street Music Hall, May 2015

Background information
- Origin: New Haven, Connecticut, U.S.
- Genres: Alternative rock; indie rock; jangle pop
- Years active: 1993–1996, 2012, 2014–present
- Label: Mezzotint
- Spinoff of: Miracle Legion
- Members: Mark Mulcahy; Dave McCaffrey; Scott Boutier; Henning Ohlenbusch
- Website: mezzotint.com

Polaris is an American independent rock band that was formed as a one-off musical project in the early 1990s, involving members of the New Haven indie rock band Miracle Legion. They were commissioned specifically to produce music for the Nickelodeon television show The Adventures of Pete & Pete, which was later compiled into the group's first and only album. Nearly twenty years after the show was cancelled, Polaris reemerged with its first tour and a cassingle of two new songs.

== History ==
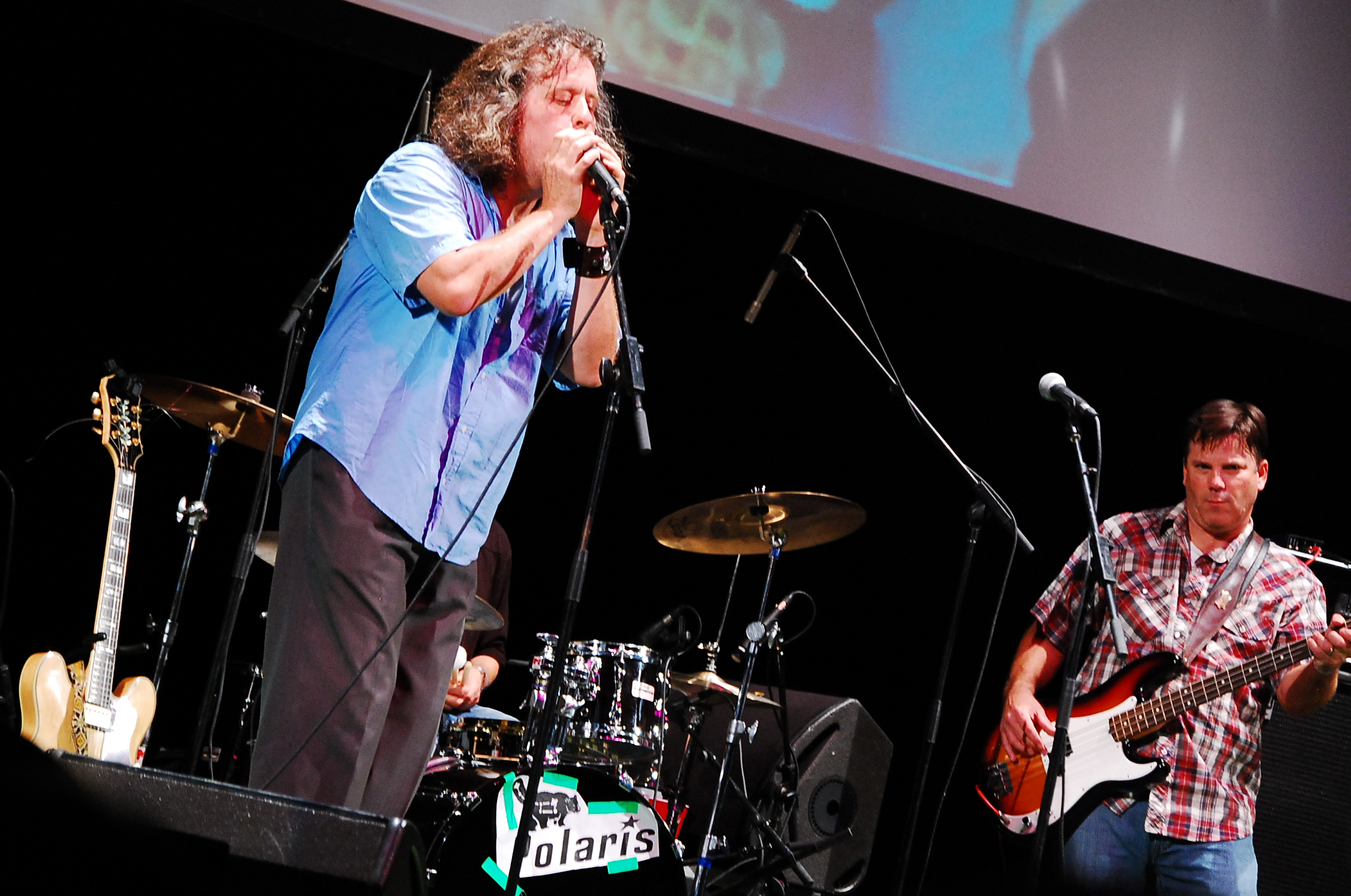
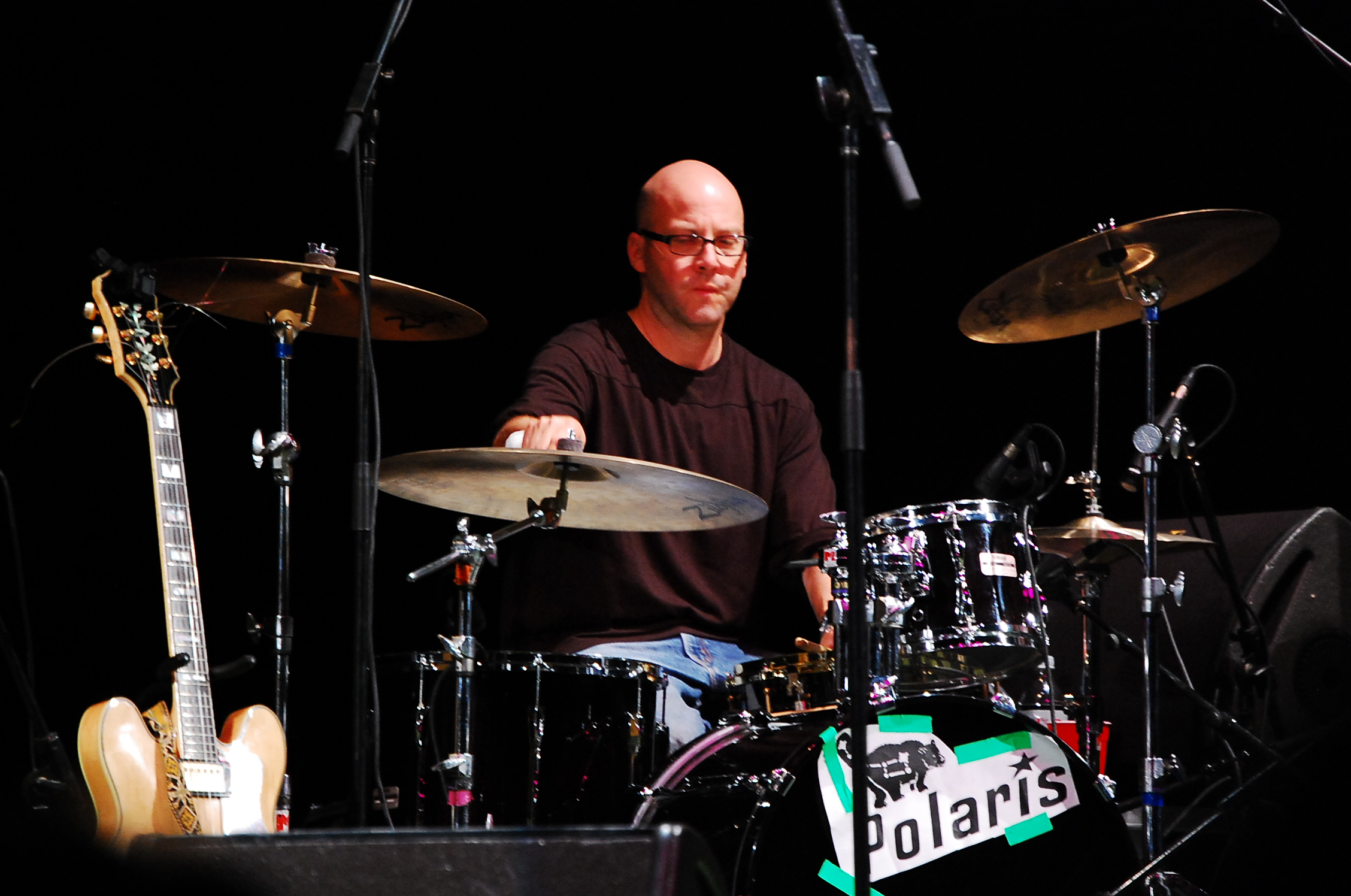
Polaris playing at the Orpheum Theatre in Los Angeles (2012).

Will McRobb and Chris Viscardi, the show-runners of The Adventures of Pete & Pete, were fans of Miracle Legion and approached the band to write original music for the series. Miracle Legion was at the time suffering from long-running legal issues with their label, Morgan Creek Records, and lead guitarist Ray Neal, disillusioned by the experience and recently married, opted out of the television project.

The remainder of the band - frontman Mark Mulcahy, bassist Dave McCaffrey and drummer Scott Boutier - moved forward with the project under the name Polaris. As the show's "house band", Polaris produced twelve songs over Pete & Pete's three seasons including the theme song, "Hey Sandy." These tracks included occasional guest contributors such as Joyce Raskin, Dennis Kelly, and Buell Thomas.

Describing itself as "that band that lives in your TV," the members of Polaris took on "TV names": Mulcahy was "Muggy", Boutier was "Jersey", and McCaffrey was "Harris Polaris." In addition to appearing in the opening credits of each show, the band featured prominently in the episode "A Hard Day's Pete", in which Little Pete (Danny Tamberelli) is mesmerized by a garage band's song (Polaris' "Summerbaby") and forms his own band to keep the tune in his memory.

The group's first release was a 1995 cassette mini-album titled "Happily Deranged" that contained three songs from the television show, including the television show's title song, "Hey Sandy". The other two songs were "Staggering" and "Coronado II". The versions of these songs differed in both running time and mix from the versions later released on their full album. The cassette also contained two additional rare tracks, an introduction and closing comments by the older of the two Petes from the television show. This cassette was released by Nickelodeon/ Sony Wonder and only available by mail as a promotional tie-in with Frosted Mini Wheats cereal. The offer was heavily promoted during Nickelodeon's SNICK (Saturday Night Nickelodeon) anthology series.

After the show was cancelled in 1996, Miracle Legion produced a final album released by Mulcahy's own label, Mezzotint Records. In 1999, the label released Music from The Adventures of Pete & Pete, containing all twelve of the Polaris tracks and serving as the group's only album.

Following the disbandment of both bands, Mulcahy focused on a solo career. From 1997 to 2003, Scott Boutier and Dave McCaffrey played drums & bass for Frank Black.

On August 28, 2012, Polaris reunited for a concert at Cinefamily's Everything Is Festival II as part of a Pete & Pete reunion event, adding Henning Ohlenbusch (dubbed "Penny Polaris") to their roster on guitar, keyboard, and backing vocals. The band claimed it was their first live performance ever. For one song at this concert, the group was joined by Rain Phoenix on vocals.

On August 26, 2014, Polaris announced their first tour, Waiting for October, with nine shows in cities such as New York City, Chicago, and Philadelphia.

In October 2014, the band released their first new material since the Nickelodeon show in the form of a digital and cassette single, thus ending their status as a "one-off project". The cassingle, consisting of "Great Big Happy Green Moonface" (also its title) and "Baby Tae Kwon Do" was made available through the Mezzotint website. It was produced by new member Ohlenbusch. In addition, an animated music video was produced for "Great Big Happy Green Moonface".

Polaris continued touring into 2015, their sets including all fourteen Polaris songs and selections from the Miracle Legion discography. On April 18, 2015, Polaris released both a vinyl edition of Music from The Adventures of Pete & Pete and the double-CD album, Live at Lincoln Hall, a recording of their concert of October 26, 2014 at the Chicago venue. In 2016, the Miracle Legion discography received a digital re-release and the band planned a brief reunion tour of their own.

In 2020, Mezzotint released a Music from the Adventures of Pete & Pete 21st Century Edition on vinyl with a bonus CD of demos for many of the songs.

== Discography ==
- Happily Deranged (cassette, Nickelodeon/Sony Wonder, LAT-6688, 1995)
- Music from The Adventures of Pete & Pete (CD, 1999; vinyl, 2015)
- "Great Big Happy Green Moonface"/"Baby Tae Kwon Do" (cassette; digital, 2014)
- Live at Lincoln Hall (CD; digital, 2015)
