= Me and Mr. Ray =

Studio album by Miracle Legion
- Released: 1989
- Length: 37:17
- Label: Rough Trade
- Producers: Mark Mulcahy, Ray Neal

Miracle Legion chronology
Surprise Surprise Surprise (1987)	Me and Mr. Ray (1989)	Drenched (1992)

Me and Mr. Ray is the second album by the American band Miracle Legion, released in 1989. It was recorded as a duo, with the pair hiring a drummer and bassist for the supporting tour. The songs were constructed around acoustic guitars.

== Critical reception ==
Professional ratings
Review scores
Source	Rating
AllMusic	3/5 stars
Chicago Tribune	3/4 stars

The Washington Post wrote that "there are some lovely tunes here ... but sometimes the thing's just too priggishly ethereal for its own good." The Chicago Tribune determined that, "without becoming maudlin or sentimental, [Mark] Mulcahy's fragile tenor invests the past with pathos, the mundane with joy." The Los Angeles Times opined that the band "plays soft-pedal sounds suited for introspective neo-folkies living on double espressos and tattered copies of Camus."

== Release ==
Released on vinyl, CD, and cassette, the 10 song LP Me and Mr. Ray was issued under Rough Trade Records. The songs were composed by Mark Mulcahy and Ray Neal.

== Track listing ==
All songs written by Mark Mulcahy and Ray Neal

No.	Title	Length
1.	"The Ladies from Town"	3:41
2.	"And Then?"	3:45
3.	"Old & New"	3:13
4.	"Sailors and Animals"	4:32
5.	"If She Could Cry"	3:30
6.	"Pull the Wagon"	5:08
7.	"You're the One Lee"	3:37
8.	"Even Better"	2:55
9.	"Cold Shoulder Balcony"	2:33
10.	"Gigantic Transatlantic Trunk Call"	3:24

== Personnel ==
- Mark Mulcahy – vocals
- Ray Neal – guitar
