= Backyard (disambiguation) =

Backyard refers to the yard or garden at the back of a house.

(The) Backyard or Back yard may also refer to:

== Film ==
- The Backyard (1920 film), 1920 silent comedy film
- The Backyard (2002 film), 2002 wrestling documentary film
- Backyard (film), a 2009 Mexican crime film

== Music ==
- The Backyard (EP), 1984 album by Miracle Legion
- "Backyard" (Pebbles song), 1990
- "Backyard", a song by Natasha Bedingfield from the 2007 album N.B.
- "Backyard", a song by Travis Scott from the mixtape Days Before Rodeo

== Other ==
- The Backyard (video game), a 1993 educational video game
