= Miracle Legion =

American rock band

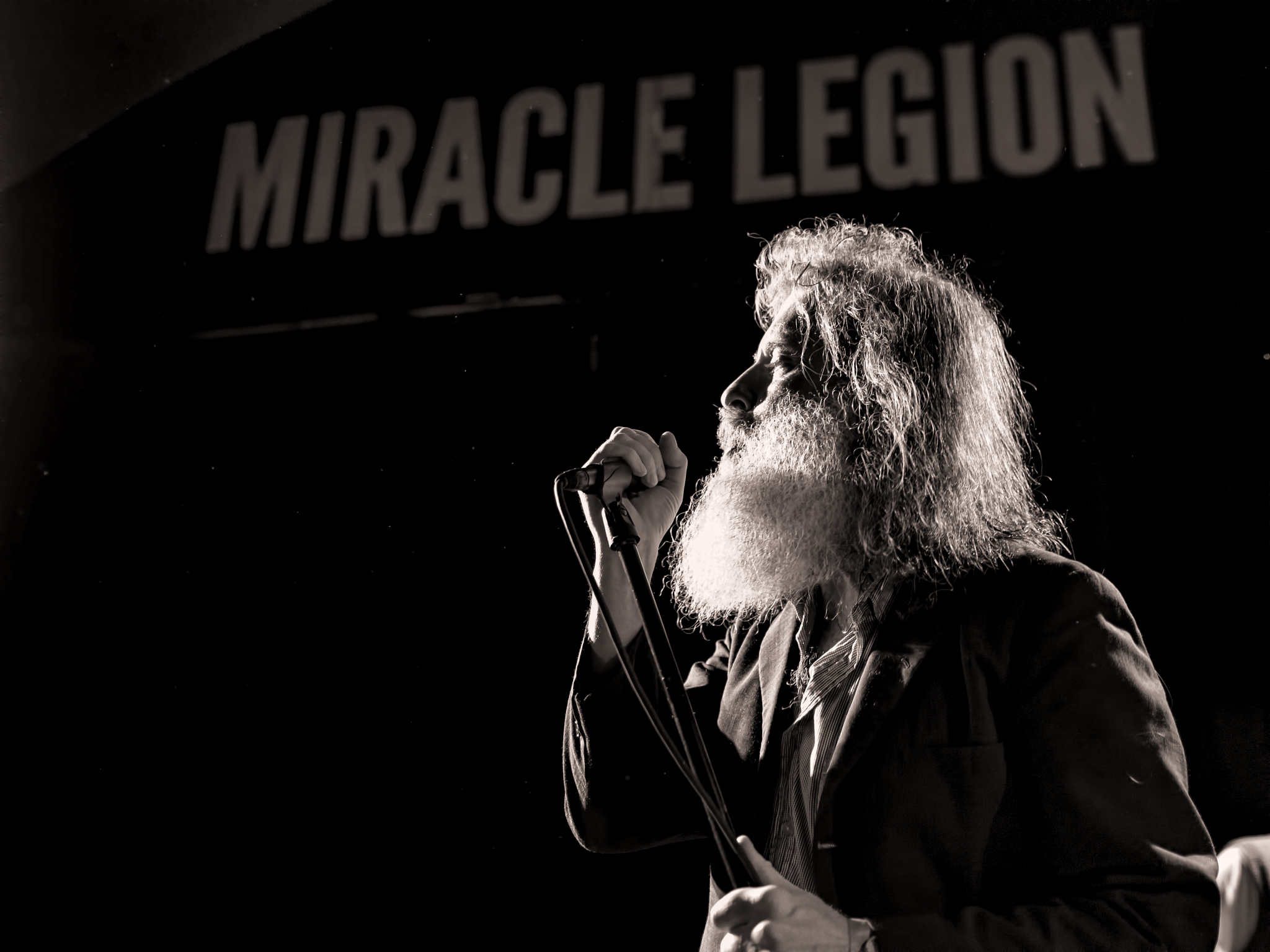
- Frontman Mark Mulcahy performing at The Chapel in San Francisco

Background information
- Origin: New Haven, Connecticut, U.S.
- Genres: Alternative rock; college rock; jangle pop
- Years active: 1983–1996; 2016–2017; 2024
- Labels: Rough Trade; Incas; Polydor; Morgan Creek; Mezzotint
- Members: Mark Mulcahy; Ray Neal; Scott Boutier; Dave McCaffrey
- Past members: Jeff Wiederschall; Joel Potocsky; Steven West
- Website: Mezzotint.com

Miracle Legion was an American college rock band formed in 1983 in New Haven, Connecticut. They earned modest renown, especially in their native New England region, but also in the UK, where they were feted by music media such as NME and Melody Maker.

== 1983–88 ==
The original lineup consisted of singer/guitarist Mark Mulcahy, lead guitarist Ray Neal, drummer Jeff Wiederschall, and bassist Joel Potocsky. In their early stages they received frequent comparisons to R.E.M., more for their presence and overall sound than for their lyrical content. Other than a few similar-sounding songs, the respective bands' sounds were largely dissimilar lyrically and musically, and as time passed, the comparisons became less valid. Their first EP, The Backyard, was financed by Brad Morrison and released on the Bridgeport, Connecticut co-op label Incas Records in 1984 and became a college radio hit. Their first full-length album, Surprise Surprise Surprise, was released in 1987 on Rough Trade Records, by which time Potocsky had been replaced by bassist Steven West. In 1988, Glad came out, consisting of new songs and live tracks (which included a guest appearance by Pere Ubu). The same year, Miracle Legion's rhythm section departed, leaving only Mulcahy and Neal in the band.

== 1989–92 ==
With the departure of drummer Wiederschall and bassist West in 1988, Mulcahy and Neal continued Miracle Legion as a duo, touring as the opening act for The Sugarcubes. Their 1989 release of Me and Mr. Ray, recorded at Prince's Paisley Park Studios, reflected the band's new direction with its stripped-down instrumentation. The album yielded a single, "You're the One Lee", the video for which received modest rotation on MTV's 120 Minutes alternative music show. That year, the band found a new rhythm section, drummer Scott Boutier and bassist Dave McCaffrey, and signed with the now-defunct label Morgan Creek Records, which funded their 1992 album Drenched produced by John Porter (of Roxy Music and The Smiths fame). The band had a limited national tour that year in support of the new album, mostly playing clubs and other small venues. The song "So Good" from Drenched was featured in the 1993 film The Crush.

== 1993–96 ==
After Drenched, legal problems with the label left the band and its name in limbo. Interest continued, however, most notably in the form of a Nickelodeon offer for the band to write music for the television show The Adventures of Pete & Pete, which was created by Miracle Legion fans Will McRobb and Chris Viscardi. Neal, disillusioned with the label experience, declined the offer; but Mulcahy accepted. He decided to do the project with Boutier and McCaffery under the name Polaris, a project which lasted three years. Their track "Hey Sandy" became the show's theme song, and the band themselves appeared in at least one episode (Season 1, "Hard Day's Pete"). In 1996, after the legal issues associated with their run with Morgan Creek were resolved, the band put out their final release to date Portrait of a Damaged Family on Mulcahy's own Mezzotint Records label.

== Post-breakup ==
Since the final Miracle Legion album, Mulcahy has released five solo albums and engaged in various other projects including film soundtrack work and a musical. Neal began playing shows again in the Northeast, both solo and with Jellyshirts. Boutier and McCaffrey have been staple members of Frank Black and the Catholics. Wiederschall has maintained an active music career, playing for The Streams, Peacock Flounders, and Baby Huey, as well as contributing to Mulcahy's 2001 solo album, SmileSunset.

In 2009, Ciao My Shining Star: The Songs of Mark Mulcahy was released as a tribute to Mulcahy's deceased wife and featured various artists covering Miracle Legion songs, as well as songs from Polaris and Mulcahy's solo career.

== Reunion ==
The band reunited in the summer of 2016, touring the Northeast and Midwestern U.S. as well as the UK in support of the reissue of Portrait of a Damaged Family. The tour continued until the spring of 2017, during which the band released a live album, Annulment.

In 2024, the band had a short tour mostly around New England, with six dates total.

== Musical style ==
Miracle Legion has been called a "jangly guitar pop band" and "a fixture of the 1980s college rock scene". Frontman Mark Mulcahy's vocals have been compared to those of R.E.M.'s Michael Stipe, and the band's execution of arpeggios has been compared to Peter Buck, also of R.E.M.

== Discography ==
=== Studio albums ===
- Surprise Surprise Surprise (1987) LP/Cassette/CD(Japan Only) on Rough Trade Records
- Me and Mr. Ray (1989) CD/LP/CS on Rough Trade Records
- Drenched (1992) CD/CS on Morgan Creek Records, LP on Polydor Records
- Portrait of a Damaged Family (1996) CD on The Mezzotint Label

=== Extended plays ===
- A Simple Thing (1983) demo album
- The Backyard (1984) 12"/Cassette EP on INCAS Records and Rough Trade Records
- Glad (1988) 12"/Cassette EP with Pere Ubu on Rough Trade Records
- You're the One Lee (1989) 12" with The Sugarcubes
- We Are All Lost (1992) CD-EP on Morgan Creek Records (promo)

=== Live album ===
- Annulment (2017) CD on The Mezzotint Label

=== Singles ===
- "Little Drummer Boy" (1985) 7" Single on Incas Records
- "Out to Play" (1992) 12" single on Morgan Creek Records (promo)
