= Drench =

Drench may also refer to:

- Steven Drench (born 1985), English footballer
- Drench, any anthelmintic drug used in deworming
- "Drench", a song from the 2002 album In Our Gun by Gomez
- "Drench", a song from the 2014 eponymous album Casualties of Cool
- "drench" is a brand of flavoured bottled water manufactured in the UK by Britvic

== See also ==
- Drenched, a 1992 album by Miracle Legion
