= Portrait of a Damaged Family =

Studio album by Miracle Legion
- Released: 1996
- Length: 54:04
- Label: The Mezzotint Label
- Producer: Drew Waters

Miracle Legion chronology
Drenched (1992)	Portrait of a Damaged Family (1996)

Professional ratings
Review scores
Source	Rating
AllMusic	2.5/5 stars
PopMatters	7/10
Consequence of Sound	B+
Irish Times	3/5 stars

Portrait of a Damaged Family is the fourth and final full-length album by Miracle Legion, and the only recorded on The Mezzotint Label, released in 1996.

== Release ==
Portrait of a Damaged Family was released under The Mezzotint Label in 1996 on CD only. In 2016, the album was re-released on vinyl, CD, and digital formats. This reissue featured a revised track listing and artwork.

== Track listing (original 1996 release) ==
All songs written by Mark Mulcahy and Ray Neal, except where noted

No.	Title	Length
1.	"You're My Blessing"	3:29
2.	"Screamin'"	3:07
3.	"Homer"	3:01
4.	"Say I Had A Lovely Time"	3:50
5.	"La Muerte Di Gardenier"	4:40
6.	"Accidentally on Purpose"	4:06
7.	"Please"	4:15
8.	"6 Months"	4:18
9.	"Madison Park" (Mulcahy/Neal/McCaffrey/Boutier)	3:07
10.	"I Wish I Was Danny Kaye"	3:49
11.	"K.K.M."	2:54
12.	"30.06 (You Better Watch Out)"	3:11
13.	"Good For Her" (Mulcahy/Neal/McCaffrey/Boutier)	3:27
14.	"Gone To Bed at 21"	4:25
15.	"(Interview)"	2:25

== Personnel ==
- Mark Mulcahy – vocals
- Ray Neal – guitar
- Scott Boutier – drums
- Dave McCaffrey – bass
