= Hey Sandy =

Song by Polaris

from the album Music from The Adventures of Pete & Pete
- Genre: Jangle pop
- Songwriter: Mark Mulcahy

"Hey Sandy" is a song by the American indie rock band Polaris which serves as the theme song for the Nickelodeon television show The Adventures of Pete & Pete. The song's lyrics, in parts, are nearly indecipherable.

== Missing lyric ==
The full lyrics were a subject of speculation for several years until they were revealed to fans by band members and cast members of the show. One line, the third and the most difficult one to understand, was purposefully left a mystery by head songwriter Mark Mulcahy. The most common assumptions are "Can you settle to shoot me?" and "Can you settle a sure bet?", with actor Danny Tamberelli backing up the second one. Another theory indicates that it could be a reference to the Kent State shootings and Sandra Lee Scheuer (being the diminutive "Sandy" of the song), although the actual meaning of the song is in debate. In regards to this, Mulcahy said in 2015: "No one is right. Nothing that anyone has guessed is right (...) But, you know, eventually no one's going to care so. I don't know if I want to take it to my grave. Maybe I do." Incorrect translations of this lyric, however, can still be found on the closed captioning of Pete and Pete DVD sets.

== Additions ==
The full album version of "Hey Sandy" begins with a sample of actor Sorrell Booke performing a section of the 1969 documentary album "To The Moon: A Time-Life Records Presentation".

"Jupiter, or Thor, is perfect. We need Atlas for our long-distance stuff. The Titan will be even better. They shouldn't have canceled Navaho. Wait 'til you see our submarines with Polaris."

Besides a reference to the band's name, the sample discusses United States ballistic missiles designed during the Cold War:

- the intermediate-range Jupiter and Thor IRBM
- the Atlas ICBM, the first successful US intercontinental ballistic missile (for "long-distance stuff")
- the Titan family of ICBMs, successors of Atlas
- the cancelled SM-64 Navaho, an experimental cruise missile developed by the U. S. Air Force
- the UGM-27 Polaris, a submarine-launched ballistic missile

Brooke's performance is abruptly cut off and followed by another sample from "To The Moon" of a radio transmission from the pre-launch testing of Apollo 11:

"Attention all personnel, this is CVTS. Base vehicle pre-count operations will start on my mark in 5... 4... 3... 2... 1..."

There is a cover version of "Hey Sandy" by the New Jersey band Mister Behavior, as well as by California math rock band Tera Melos on their covers EP Idioms, Vol. I
