= Drenched =

Studio album by Miracle Legion
- Released: 1992
- Length: 42:09
- Label: Morgan Creek Records
- Producer: John Porter

Miracle Legion chronology
Me and Mr. Ray (1989)	Drenched (1992)	Portrait of a Damaged Family (1996)

Professional ratings
Review scores
Source	Rating
AllMusic	4/5 stars
Chicago Tribune	3/5 stars

Drenched is the third full-length album by Miracle Legion, and the only one released on the Morgan Creek Records label, in 1992.

== Release ==
The album was released on both CD and cassette.

== Track listing ==
All songs written by Mark Mulcahy and Ray Neal, except where noted

No.	Title	Length
1.	"Sooner"	3:08
2.	"Sea Hag"	4:35
3.	"Snacks and Candy" (Mulcahy/Neal/McCaffrey/Boutier)	4:01
4.	"So Good"	4:32
5.	"Everything is Rosy" (Mulcahy/Neal/McCaffrey/Boutier)	5:45
6.	"With a Wish"	3:41
7.	"Little Blue Light"	3:38
8.	"Out to Play"	3:07
9.	"Velvetine"	3:15
10.	"Waiting Room"	4:36
11.	"Maybelline" (Mulcahy/Neal/McCaffrey/Boutier)	1:51

== Personnel ==
- Mark Mulcahy - vocals
- Ray Neal - guitar
- Scott Boutier - drums
- Dave McCaffrey - bass
