= The Adventures of Pete & Pete =

American sitcom

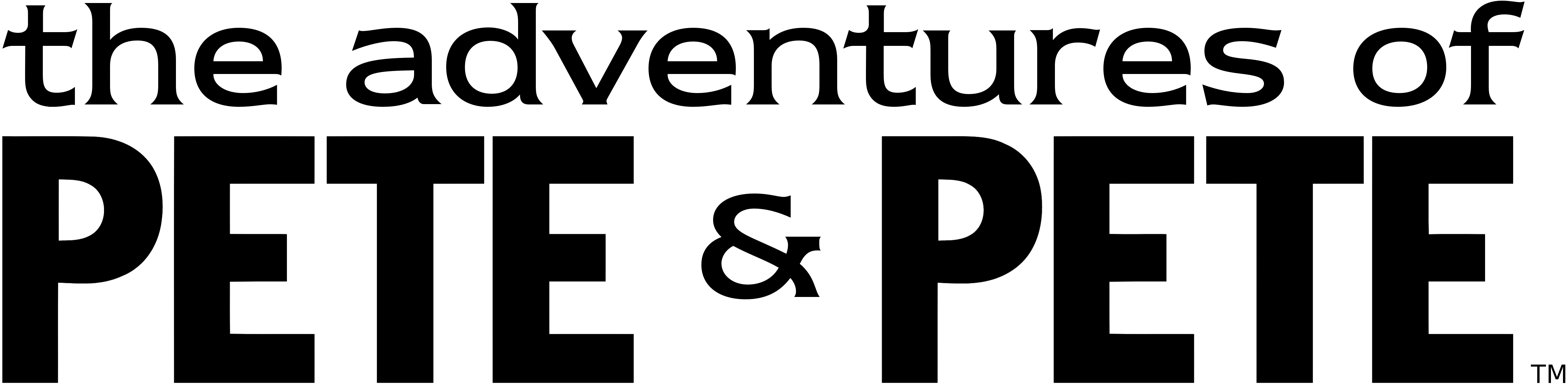
- Genre: Sitcom; Coming-of-age; Surreal comedy
- Created by: Will McRobb; Chris Viscardi
- Starring: Michael Maronna; Danny Tamberelli; Alison Fanelli; Hardy Rawls; Judy Grafe; Toby Huss; Michelle Trachtenberg
- Narrated by: Michael Maronna
- Theme music composer: Mark Mulcahy
- Opening theme: "Hey Sandy" by Polaris
- Composer: Mark Mulcahy
- Country of origin: United States
- Original language: English
- No. of seasons: 3
- No. of episodes: 34 (plus 5 specials and 26 shorts) (list of episodes)

Production
- Producer: Charles Darby
- Running time: 24 minutes
- Production companies: Gordon Productions (1993–1995) (seasons 1–2); Wellsville Pictures (1995–1996) (season 3); Nickelodeon Productions

Original release
- Network: Nickelodeon
- Release: 1989 – 1990 (shorts)
- Release: February 9, 1991 – January 2, 1993 (specials)
- Release: November 28, 1993 – April 1, 1996

The Adventures of Pete & Pete, or simply Pete & Pete, is an American television sitcom created by Will McRobb and Chris Viscardi for Nickelodeon. It focuses on two brothers, both named Pete Wrigley, and their humorous and surreal adventures in suburbia among their equally eccentric friends, enemies, and neighbors.

The Adventures of Pete & Pete began on Nickelodeon in 1989 as minute-long and 30-second shorts that aired as interstitials. Because of the popularity of the shorts, five half-hour specials were made, followed by a regular half-hour series that ran for three seasons from 1993 to 1996. On October 5, 2015, reruns of the shorts began airing on TeenNick as part of the NickSplat block. The full-length episodes reran on the block in June 2017.

The series received critical acclaim throughout its run. Jason Ankeny of AllMusic called the series "the greatest children's show ever", while IGN called it "one of the most well-written kids shows ever". The first two seasons were released on DVD in 2005; the third was planned for 2006 but was indefinitely postponed.

The show was originally produced by Ken Walz through his company, Gordon Productions (named after his middle name of Ken Walz himself), but Walz left and the creators took control via his production company, Wellsville Pictures.

Plans for a film based on the show fell through and the script was reworked into the Nickelodeon movie Snow Day, released on February 11, 2000. That film in turn, got a musical remake in 2022 as well.

== Setting ==
Pete & Pete is set in Wellsville, a fictitious town in the United States whose exact geography is never specified. License plates in the show refer to "The Sideburn State", and according to the series' canon, the Wrigley house is set miles from the Canadian border, 500 miles from Hoover Dam and "not far from the beach". The name of the town is also a nod to The Embarrassment's song "Wellsville". Certain locations were fictionalized for the purposes of the show; Glurt County, mentioned in "Yellow Fever" and "The Good, the Bad and the Lucky", does not exist in any state.

The show was filmed largely in Leonia, New Jersey, with location shots done in a variety of other spots around northern New Jersey, including the Willowbrook Mall in Wayne, New Jersey, and the Wrigley House in Cranford, New Jersey. The exteriors of Pete & Pete's house (as seen in the credit sequence and other shots) were filmed on Vreeland Avenue in Leonia. The football field used for various episodes is that of Bayonne High School in Bayonne, New Jersey. The fictional Wellsville High School's mascot is a squid.

== Episodes ==
Season	Episodes	Originally released	
Season	Episodes	First released	Last released
Specials	5	February 9, 1991	January 2, 1993
1	8	November 28, 1993	January 16, 1994
2	13	September 4, 1994	December 4, 1994
3	13	October 1, 1995	April 1, 1996

== Characters ==
=== Family ===
Danny Tamberelli (top) as Little Pete and Mike Maronna (bottom) as Big Pete

"Big" Pete Wrigley (Michael Maronna)
The show's narrator, Big Pete often acts as a voice of reason in contrast to the strange occurrences and people around him. However, he also grapples with the problem of growing up and thus losing sight of the simple happiness of childhood, often to the disappointment of Little Pete. Aside from typical sibling rivalry, he and his brother are best friends. Big Pete plays trombone in the school marching band. Big Pete's nemeses are "Endless" Mike Hellstrom and Open Face. He and Little Pete shared enemies in both Hat Head and Lifeguard Matt "The Urinator" Uplinger.
"Little" Pete Wrigley (Danny Tamberelli)
Four years younger than his brother, Little Pete is often engaged in struggles against adults and other authority figures. He is also known to make irrational decisions in response to problems, like selling the house because his brother hung out with a girl instead of him, without taking responsibility for it (the only exception was in 'Grounded for Life'). Little Pete has various enemies, including Papercut (who was originally Artie's main enemy, besides John McFlemp). He showed defiance in throwing scissors, instead of rock, which angered Papercut to swear revenge on him and destroy him in the rematch. Little Pete's primary nemeses are Pit Stain (for insulting his glandular disorder) and Principal Ken Schwinger (the principal at his school). He and Big Pete share enemies in Hat Head and Lifeguard Matt "The Urinator" Uplinger.
"Petunia"
A tattoo on Little Pete's forearm depicting a prone woman in a red dress, Petunia receives her own credit in the show's opening sequence. Little Pete likes to make Petunia "dance" by flexing his forearm. In the series, Petunia's origins are a mystery and a cause of bafflement for Big Pete, though in an early Pete & Pete short, it is explained that Little Pete originally got the tattoo as a Mother's Day gift, infuriating his father and causing his mother to faint. Little Pete has a second tattoo of a sailing ship on his back, although the origins of this tattoo are never explained.
Joyce Wrigley (Judy Grafe)
The Petes' mother, usually just called "Mom". She tends to be the more stern, conventional parent, but also tends to be more reasonable than her husband, agreeing to compromise with her sons when the need arises. She also tends to intervene when her husband goes too far.
Mom's Plate
The plate in Joyce's head, which, like Petunia, gets its own opening credit via an X-ray. It can pick up radio stations, and, in the case of Little Pete's radio station WART, can also broadcast them. Though it is stated that Joyce got the plate due to a childhood accident, the nature of the accident is never explained.
Donald "Don" Wrigley (Hardy Rawls)
Usually known as "Dad", Don is the Petes' father. He and Joyce met when the metal detector he was using on a beach led him to the metal plate in her head. He is extremely competitive against practically everyone, including his own sons (particularly Little Pete, who seems to have gotten his own stubborn streak from his father), his neighbors, and other local parents. His hobbies include obsessive lawn care, bowling, and fishing, particularly for "Old Bob", a legendary striped bass.

=== Friends ===
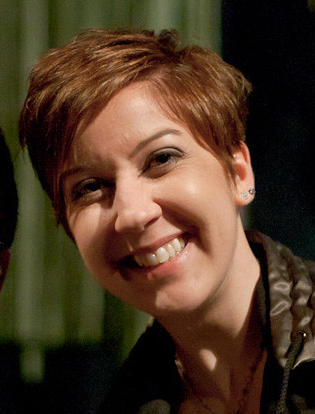
Alison Fanelli (pictured in 2012) played Ellen Hickle, Big Pete's best friend.

Ellen Josephine Hickle (Alison Fanelli)
Ellen is Big Pete's best friend; though romance develops between the two on rare occasions, Pete generally sees Ellen as "a girl and a friend, but not a girlfriend". Over the course of the show, she demonstrates some obsessive tendencies. In the pre-season 1 short "The Dot", as well as the season one episode "Day of the Dot" she is assigned the position of the letter "I" in "Squids" as part of the school marching band and attempts to hypnotize herself into "perfect dot-ness". She played French horn in the band. Ellen is also a huge fan of Greco-Roman wrestling and has vast knowledge on the subject, as seen in the episode "Pinned" where she tries to coach Big Pete.

Artie, the Strongest Man in the World (Toby Huss)

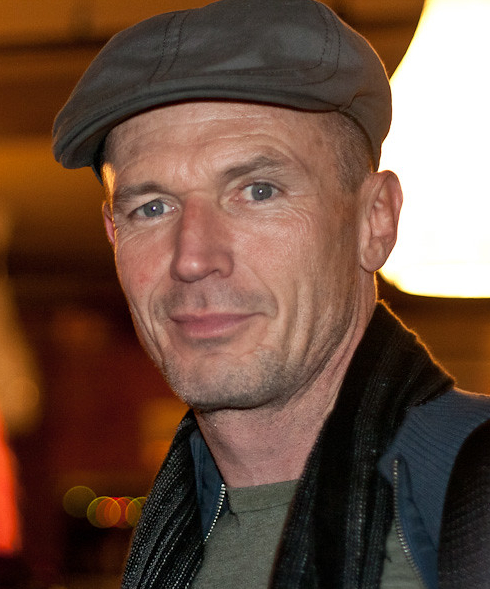
Toby Huss played Artie, Little Pete's personal superhero.

Little Pete's personal superhero and one of the few adults for whom he holds any respect. His catchphrase is "I am Artie – the strongest man ... in the world!" He wears a costume of a tight-fitting red-white-and-blue striped shirt, red long johns, and black running shoes without socks (claiming the lack of socks allows him to run at super-speeds, with the drawback of blisters). Artie claims an array of eccentric but apparently legitimate superpowers: he can skip stones on Neptune, move an entire house by an inch, turn Hat Head into a jack-o'-lantern, and hit a golf ball 300,003 yards, among other feats. In the two-parter "Farewell, My Little Viking" the villainous John McFlemp, wanting to allow the International Adult Conspiracy to take charge of Wellsville, decided to run Artie out of town and manipulated Don into persuading him to leave. Don did this despite misgivings, but finally saw sense when Joyce made him see how miserable Little Pete was without him. Upon returning, Artie saw Little Pete standing up to his personal nemesis, Paper Cut, on his own and realized he was no longer needed. He bid farewell to Little Pete and left Wellsville to find another little boy in need of a superhero. His spot in the opening credits would later be replaced in the third season with Nona.

Theodore "Teddy" L. Forzman (David Martel)
Teddy is one of Big Pete's three friends (the others being Ellen and Bill). Teddy is a perpetually cheerful dork who is also in marching band and is known for bringing up odd trivia, then remarking "what, you guys didn't know that?" He also loves to exclaim "Excelente!" while raising his finger and give "soul shakes" (an elaborate handshake punctuated by hissing "Soul!") to friends. Teddy's cheerful personality once drove Endless Mike to a complete emotional breakdown.

Bill Korn (Rick Barbarette)
Bill is Big Pete's friend, who has a knack for practical jokes and sarcasm. He was renowned for getting Teddy to shoot milk out of his ears and getting Bus Driver Stu accused of kidnapping a busload of kids. He also admitted to once eating snot in the episode "Field of Pete". Bill did not appear after the second season.

Nona F. Mecklenberg (Michelle Trachtenberg)

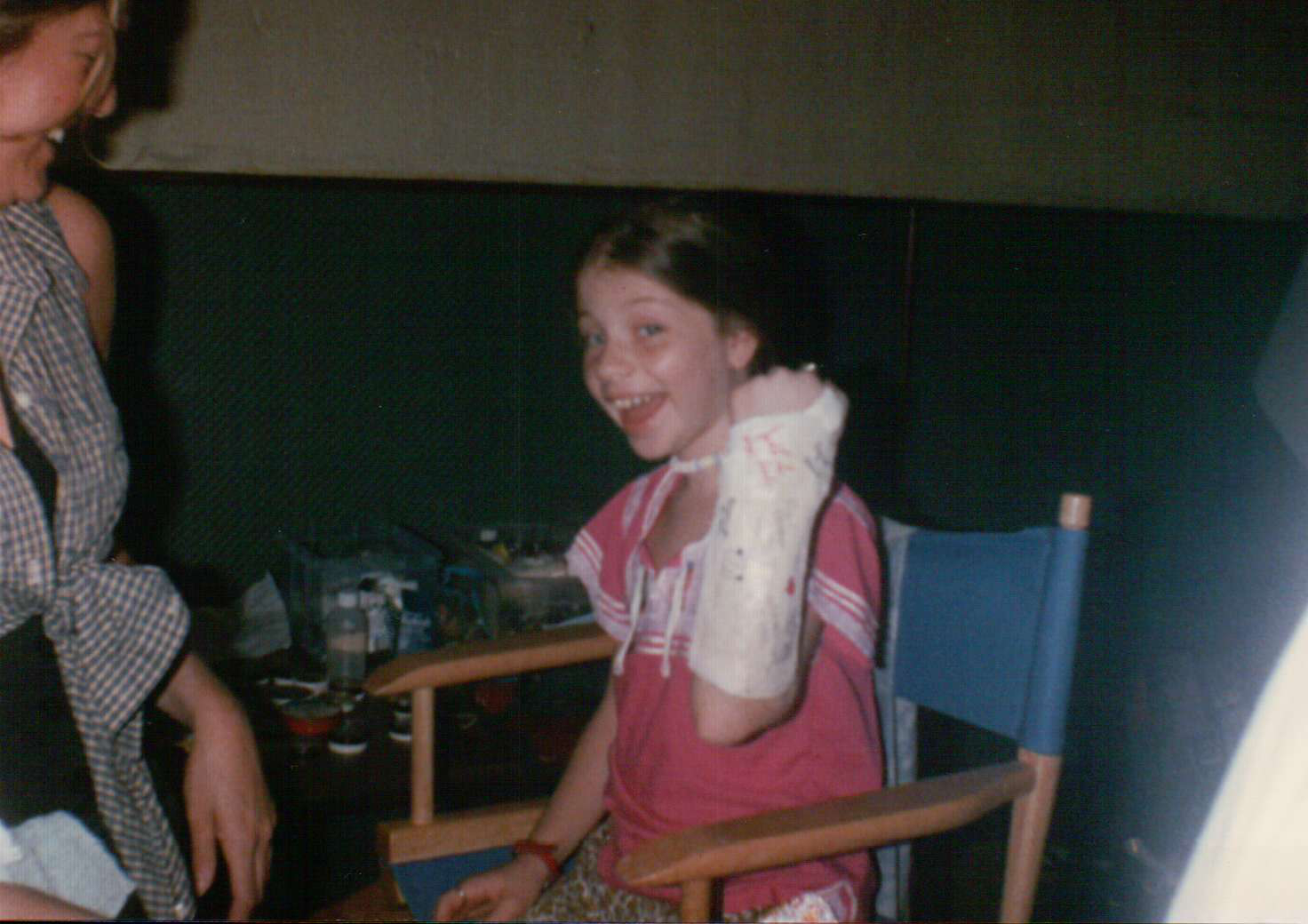
Michelle Trachtenberg pictured in 1995 dressed as her character, Nona F. Mecklenberg (Little Pete's best friend).

Little Pete's best friend. Her middle initial "F" stands for Frances, but she wants to change it to Frank, Fahrvergnügen, or Forklift. She wears a cast, not because she has a broken arm but because it causes an annoying, itchy feeling on her arm which she enjoys scratching. She had a brief crush on Little Pete once or twice in the series.

Natasha (Heather Matarazzo)
A neighborhood kid and Little Pete's friend. She was a member of the Nightcrawlers, who forced herself to stay awake by pulling her pigtails.

Monica Perling (Maris Hudson)
One of Little Pete's friends, Monica is the resident Kreb Scout. Her unfortunate luck with pets has given her a reputation as the "Girl Scout of Death", and she even has a graveyard for them. She has excellent hearing, supposedly because one of her ancestors married a bloodhound.

Wayne Pardue (Justin Restivo)
Also known as "Wayne the Pain". First appearing in the third season, Wayne tended to tag along with Little Pete and his friends, but as his nickname implied, Little Pete found him annoying due to his cluelessness and his tendency to spout phrases like "geez louise!" Wayne had an unrequited crush on Monica, who found him as irritating as everyone else.

Clem LaNelle (Aaron Schwartz)
He was in several episodes as a friend of Little Pete. He served as the drummer of Little Pete's band, The Blowholes, and was a member of the Nightcrawlers, staying awake longer than anyone other than Little Pete and Artie. Tamberelli and Schwartz appeared together in the film The Mighty Ducks, but neither appeared in the sequels.

Libby Hurley (Winnie Zhang)
Appeared in the "Nightcrawlers" and "The Call" episodes as a friend of Little Pete. Libby was adopted by the Hurley family. She stays awake via solar-powered sneezes, but flagged once the sun went down.

=== Enemies ===
"Endless" Mike Hellstrom (Rick Gomez)
Endless Mike is the mortal enemy of Big Pete. The origins of his nickname are unknown, though it is speculated it was due to his perpetually repeating the same year of high school; it has also been stated that his nickname comes from the fact that "his hatred of Big Pete is endless". Endless Mike reigns over shop class and loves Neapolitan ice cream. Although his relationship with Big Pete is largely antagonistic, the two have joined forces on rare occasions. The neighborhood kids hate and despise Endless Mike, but also envy him because he owns his own car. He hates Little Pete in "Time Tunnel" for humiliating him at the drive-in theater by showing everyone their home movies of him as a toddler and making him a laughingstock. In "Halloweenie" he foils Endless Mike's attempt to make Big Pete hate the holiday like him by putting a jack-o'-lantern over his head.

"Hat Head" (Chris Leveille)
Hat Head draws his name from the fact that his hair perpetually looks as if it has been flattened by a hat, even though he is almost never actually seen wearing a hat. (The only exception being in the short "Hathead".) He originally appeared on several of the original shorts, making him the first bully in the Pete & Pete world. He is frequently defeated by Artie, who protects both Petes from him and even made him into a man-made jack-o'-lantern with his proton push.

"Open-Face" (Jason Late)
One of Big Pete's enemies. A boy who is always shown eating open-faced sandwiches, even in church. Ellen dated him briefly in one episode.

Fran "Pit Stain" Jones (Eric Kushnick)
Little Pete's primary antagonist in season 3, he has a glandular disorder that gives him huge, smelly armpit stains. Little Pete gave him the nickname, which was quickly adopted by everyone in school (including the teachers), causing Pit Stain to swear revenge against Little Pete. He has a secret crush on Nona, which often distracts him to the point of abandoning his pursuit of Little Pete. He is also often seen with his goons, "Hairnet" (Helen Davidson) and "Drawstring" (Yull Neri Borda). Drawstring was later replaced by "Nightbrace" (Robert Whitfield). During episode 3.07, "The Last Laugh", Little Pete and Pit Stain worked together to mastermind a prank on Principal Schwinger and the "Up With Personal Hygiene Singers".

"Paper Cut" (Christopher Conte)
Artie's original enemy in the season 2 episode "Farewell, My Little Viking" (parts 1 and 2). A boy who grew up in a copy shop, he is covered with lacerations and scars from paper cuts. Paper Cut can fold paper into hundreds of origami shapes, including makeshift weapons. According to Big Pete, the numerous paper cuts did "some kind of origami number on his brain." Paper Cut enjoyed making life miserable for the helpless students by forcing them to throw "rock" while playing rock paper scissors (since he always throws "paper"). When Little Pete defied him by throwing scissors, he became Paper Cut's enemy. He swore to destroy Little Pete in the rematch. Little Pete repeatedly defies him, and the other students, finally seeing how helpless Paper Cut is when he isn't allowed to get his way, gang up and drive Paper Cut out of Wellsville forever.

Principal Ken Schwinger (Adam West)
The principal of Little Pete's school who always tries to stop his pranks, to no avail. Schwinger has earned the title of Most Despised Principal in Wellsville. According to Big Pete it wasn't just the mandatory regime of squat thrusts in gym class and ordering that the school serve creamed corn (Schwinger's favorite food) for every meal that earned him that reputation, it was his continuous inviting a singing group called "Up With Personal Hygiene" Singers to perform every year. This reflected both his strange obsession with personal hygiene that stemmed from childhood and his tyrannical control over the student body. This last caused Little Pete to make a truce with his mortal enemy Pit Stain to orchestrate a prank that ruins Schwinger's reputation and frees the school from his control. In turn, the humiliated singers revoke Schwinger's honorary giant cotton swab and swear off the school forever.

Matt "The Urinator" Uplinger (Christopher Cooke)
The lifeguard at the Wellsville swimming pool, he appears in ("Splashdown") as an antagonist to both Petes. When Little Pete and his friends threaten adult swim with their "atomic splash", Uplinger conspires to undermine them by giving Big Pete a lifeguard whistle and power over the pool. Big Pete is won over by his new authority and tries to do a good job by enforcing the pool rules, including kicking his brother and friends out of the pool. However, Big Pete realizes that Uplinger has been using him and soon joins Little Pete in defying Uplinger by performing the Atomic Splash, causing even the adults to join them in the forbidden dive. Uplinger is finally defeated, and he is exposed as having broken the primary pool rule: never urinate in the pool's filter. Monica proved this by using a chemical known as Weewee See, which exposes his inability to hold his bladder after drinking too much coffee. Uplinger is humiliated further as everyone chases him out of the pool for good.

=== Neighbors ===
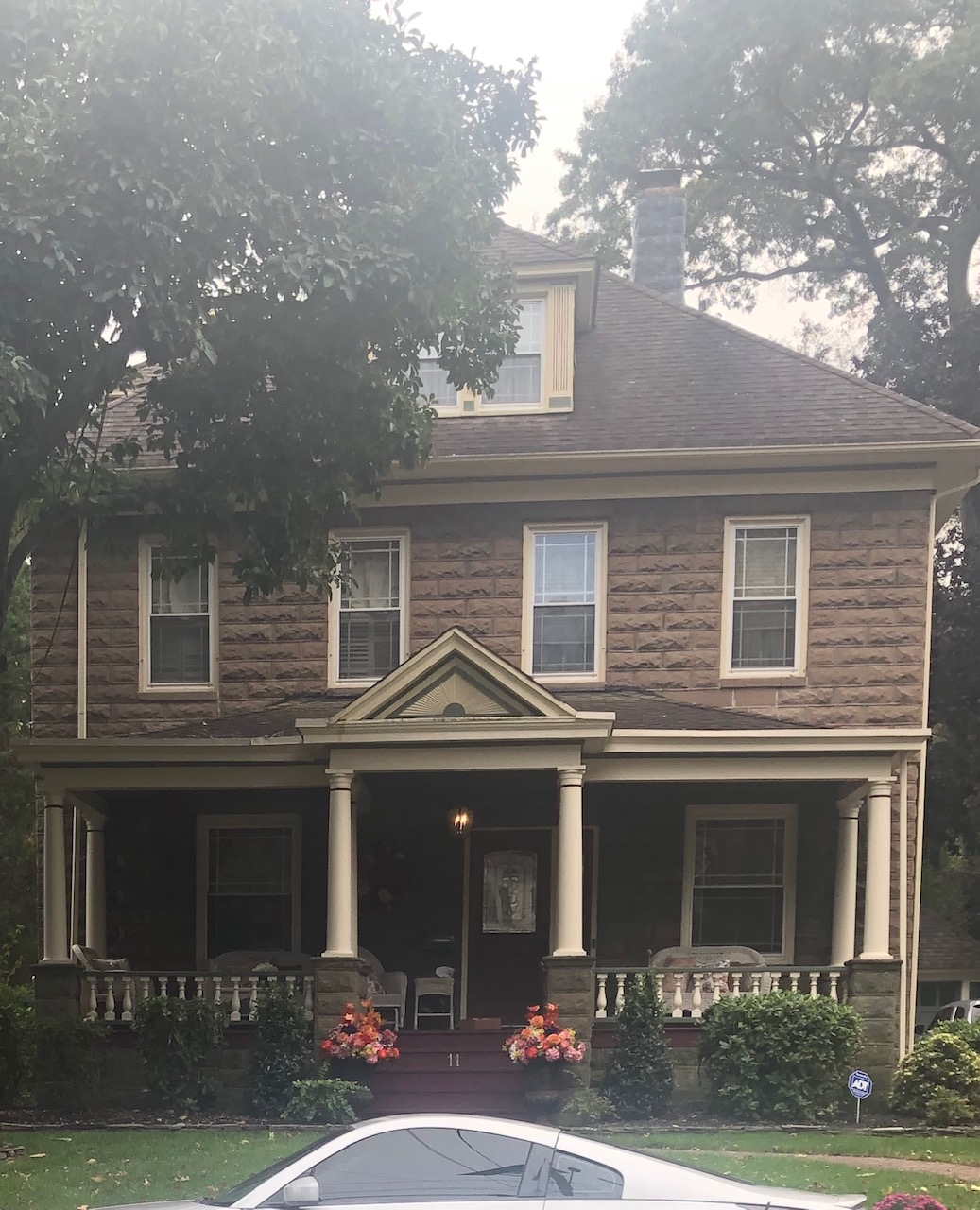
The Wrigley house from season 3, located in Cranford, New Jersey.

Phil Hickle (Steve Buscemi)
Ellen's father and guidance counselor of Big Pete's high school. Once an enemy of Don Wrigley in "Apocalypse Pete".
James "Pop" Mecklenberg (Iggy Pop)
Nona's loving and occasionally overprotective dad. One of the many adults who feared Artie due to his strange ways, until Artie stood up for him against his mortal enemy, John McFlemp. He is very proud of his home and his neighborhood. After the Pumpkin Eater gang was exposed, Mr. Mecklenberg forced the gang to clean the entire neighborhood with cotton swabs.
Mr. Tastee (Toby Huss)
A parody of Mister Softee, Mr. Tastee is a mysterious ice cream vendor who never removes his mascot costume head. Mr. Tastee comes to symbolize summer for the neighborhood kids, who become caught up in the mystery of who he is and why he seems so lonely. When the Petes' attempts to strike up a friendship cause Tastee to flee, the Petes and Ellen spend the summer tracking him down via his holiday photographs, learning that he was once married to a beautiful blind heiress who called him "Leonard". The kids eventually find Mr. Tastee, who confesses that he has commitment issues. They agree to allow Mr. Tastee his privacy as long as he returns to the neighborhood.
Stu Benedict (Damian Young)
An eccentric and emotionally unstable bus driver who was once in love with fellow bus driver Sally Knorp. His longing for Knorp causes him to drive his charges in endless loops through town, pointing out significant locations in his and Sally's relationship, while the children are forced to listen in frustration. Finally, Endless Mike comes to the trapped kids' rescue by reporting Stu for kidnapping, while Ellen and Big Pete arrange a reconciliation with Sally. Stu does play protector to Little Pete in the season 2 finale episode "Sick Day" when he helps him avoid getting caught skipping school, and in the season 3 episode "The Good, The Bad and the Lucky", where he puts Pit Stain and his gang under bus arrest.
Frank Gulcher (Jim Lally)
A crossing guard who defends the crosswalk with his life, abiding by "the code of the crosswalk". Frank is haunted by the memory of the time he failed to save Little Pete's pet lizard Gary from death by oncoming traffic. Despite this, Gulcher is one of the few adults who Little Pete is friends with.

=== Guest stars ===
The many guest stars that appeared on Pete & Pete include:

- Selma Blair – Penelope Ghiruto, school bus passenger from whose name Big Pete can make 27 words. ("Das Bus")
- Elizabeth Bogush – Diane Senski, love interest of Big Pete who loses interest due to Big Pete's friendship with Teddy, whom she finds too annoying. ("The Trouble With Teddy")
- Golden Brooks – Heather, captain of the tennis team and Big Pete's love interest. ("Crisis in the Love Zone")
- Jude Ciccolella and Don Creech – Mr. Slurm, high school shop teacher with a claw for a hand. He later returns in season 3 to serve as the school's driving instructor. ("Tool and Die" and "Road Warrior")
- Ellen Cleghorne – Bus driver Sally Knorp, on-again/off-again girlfriend of Stu Benedict. (Appears in "Day of the Dot" and "Yellow Fever", though she is mentioned in other episodes)
- Marshall Crenshaw – "Lightning" Mel Ratner, a meter reader who joins Little Pete's band. ("A Hard Day's Pete")
- Art Donovan – As himself, talking to Big Pete about playing with Johnny Unitas. ("Space, Geeks, and Johnny Unitas")
- Martin Donovan – Crossing guard Kenneth G. Keegan who passes messages between Big Pete and Ellen in "Apocalypse Pete"; also Smith ("Smitty"), a security guard whom Little Pete and Petunia distract in "Space, Geeks, and Johnny Unitas".
- Richard Edson – School janitor and field chalker, Mr. Beverly. ("Valentine's Day Massacre")
- Chris Elliott – Meterman Ray, a meter reader who foretells the future by gazing into the energy meter; he predicts Little Pete's future. ("Sick Day")
- Gordon Gano – Mr. Zank, the first of many substitute math teachers. ("X=Why?")
- Janeane Garofalo – Ms. Brackett, an English teacher. ("X=Why?")
- Frank Gifford – As himself, a customer at Dad's driving range. ("Rangeboy")
- Ellen Greene – Abilene Jones, drive-in film operator. ("Time Tunnel")
- Debbie Harry – A neighbor whose lawn the Petes sweep for land mines. ("New Year's Pete")
- Eliza Harris – Girl in the straitjacket. ("Last Laugh")
- Juliana Hatfield – Lunchlady Emma. ("Don't Tread on Pete")
- Patty Hearst – Mrs. Kretchmar, a member of the family that moves into the Wrigley house. ("35 Hours")
- William Hickey – Grandpa Wrigley, Dad's dad. ("When Petes Collide")
- David Johansen – Park Ranger Thorsen, who scrutinizes Dad's activities until learning he is hunting for Old Bob. ("On Golden Pete")
- LL Cool J – Mr. Thornberry, Little Pete's teacher. ("Sick Day")
- Luscious Jackson – The band that plays at the school dance. ("Dance Fever")
- Alicia Keys – A student ("Tool and Die")
- Ann Magnuson – Eunice Puell, mail carrier and object of Little Pete's affection. ("Crisis in the Love Zone")
- John McLaughlin – As himself, devoting a portion of his show to support Big Pete's bid for Dad's bowling ball. ("When Petes Collide")
- Miracle Legion – The four-piece version of Polaris that Little Pete sees in a garage ("A Hard Day's Pete"). Polaris, in turn, was Miracle Legion minus guitarist Mr. Ray.
- Bebe Neuwirth – Mail Lady McGintee, a mail carrier whom Little Pete comes across on his sick day adventure. ("The Call", "Sick Day")
- Larisa Oleynik – A nurse who rushes Little Pete through the hospital. ("Dance Fever")
- Vincent Pastore – Vincent Park, a neighbor and bowling agent who is impressed with Artie's bowling skills and gets him to sign a bowling contract.
- Geoff Pierson – Mr. Perfect, Dad's competition on a family trip to the Hoover Dam. ("The King of the Road")
- Kate Pierson – Mysterious blind millionaire Mrs. Vanderveer, who was once married to Mr. Tastee. ("What We Did on Our Summer Vacation")
- John Ottavino – Inspector 34, inspector of Kreb of the Loom underwear and Little Pete's guardian angel. ("Inspector 34")
- Suzzy Roche – PEO MacMillan, meter maid and Inspector 34's love interest. ("Inspector 34")
- James Rebhorn – Supervillain John McFlemp, who rallies the neighborhood to turn Artie into a respectable adult. ("Farewell My Little Viking" (parts 1 and 2))
- Sarah Shannon – A grocery store employee who gives Little Pete a label from an expired can of tapioca pudding. ("Sick Day")
- J. K. Simmons – Barber Dan, who refuses to talk to Big Pete. ("Saturday")
- Michael Stipe – Captain Scrummy, a disliked rival ice-cream vendor to Mr. Tastee. ("What We Did On Our Summer Vacation")
- Syd Straw – Math teacher Miss Fingerwood who loves the subject of mathematics; it's rumored that she got into math when she was a baby and mistook the number 2 in her baby crib mobile for her mother. Played bass in the Blowholes. ("Hard Day's Pete", "X=Why", "Valentine's Day Massacre")
- Liza Weil – Margie Corsell, a girl for whom Big Pete abandons his brother ("35 Hours"). Weil also played a bully in "Yellow Fever", with her mother Lisa as a teacher in the same episode.

One widely reported guest appearance – Hunter S. Thompson in "New Year's Pete" – has been described as "apocryphal" by show creator Will McRobb, who has said the Hunter Thompson listed in the credits is instead a similarly named extra.

== Music ==
The show featured music by such artists as Luscious Jackson, Nice, Drop Nineteens, Racecar, Chug, Poi Dog Pondering, Syd Straw, and The Apples in Stereo. The music of Stephin Merritt can also be heard throughout the series, including songs from his projects The Magnetic Fields, The 6ths, and The Gothic Archies. On the DVD commentaries, the director and the creators revealed that they tried to use a song by the Pixies, but could not afford the rights.

Polaris, a side project of Mark Mulcahy's Miracle Legion, served as the show's "house band", providing the theme song and many other tunes heard throughout the series and even appearing in "Hard Day's Pete" as a local four-piece playing out of a garage. Some of Polaris's music from the show was released as a CD, Music from The Adventures of Pete & Pete, including the theme song "Hey Sandy".

Polaris's music for the show was released on vinyl on Record Store Day 2015. The album tracks are:

1. "Hey Sandy"
2. "She Is Staggering"
3. "Waiting For October"
4. "Saturnine"
5. "Everywhere"
6. "Ivy Boy"
7. "Summerbaby"
8. "Coronado II"
9. "Ashamed Of The Story I Told"
10. "As Usual"
11. "Recently"
12. "The Monster's Loose"

With a total of 2100 pressings, the album sold out promptly and was considered a must-own by many reputable collector sites, such as Modern Vinyl, Consequence of Sound, and Paste.

Music from the show was also available in 1995 on a promotional cassette mini album, titled Happily Deranged, available by sending in UPC symbols from Kellogg's Frosted Mini-Wheats. This cassette includes the Polaris songs "Hey Sandy", "She is Staggering" (listed on the cassette as "Staggering"), and "Coronado II". The cassette includes a short introduction and closing read by Big Pete.

Robert Agnello was the writer and creator of numerous pieces of music for Pete & Pete and wrote the Blowholes music for the "Hard Day's Pete" episode. The show runners originally intended to use the song "Mississippi Queen" by Mountain for the episode, but could not afford the song rights and instead asked Agnello to write a "sound-alike" version. Agnello's sound-alike song, "Marmalade Cream", was so catchy that he was asked to produce three other songs for the episode: "Summer Wind", "Piledriver", and "You Color My World". He also wrote "One Lousy Dance" which was sung by Iggy Pop and the Garbageman theme sung by David Johanson. Many incidental songs in the series were performed by Agnello and his band Lamb to Slaughter.

=== Production music ===
The show also used music from standard production music libraries.

- "Blood in the Gutter" by Laurie Johnson
- "Drama Link (d)" by Hubert Clifford
- "Dramatic Impact #3" by Ivor Slaney
- "Fisticuffs" by Laurie Johnson
- "Ballata Per Un Pistolero (Ballad of a Gunman)" A notable Western theme in the style of Ennio Morricone, it was used whenever there was a showdown between characters, for example Little Pete and the ringing phone in "The Call".
- "Lonely Stranger" by Laurie Johnson
- "Maniac Pursuit" by Trevor Duncan
- "Aloha" by Dick Stephen Walter
- "The Pilgrim" by Jan Cyrka

== Home media ==
=== VHS ===
The VHS tapes were released by Sony Wonder.

- "Snick Vol. 1: Nick Snicks Friendship" – Includes one episode from each show in the early SNICK lineup: Clarissa Explains It All, Roundhouse, The Ren & Stimpy Show, and Are You Afraid of the Dark?. A pre-series Pete & Pete short is included in between each show. This tape includes the shorts "Artie, the Strongest Man in the World", "X-Ray Man", and "Route 34".
- "Snick Vol. 2: Nick Snicks the Family" – Includes the same lineup as "Friendship". The Pete & Pete shorts are "The Burping Room", "Mom's Plate", and "The Punishment".
- "Classic Petes" – Includes the episodes "What We Did on Our Summer Vacation" and "Apocalypse Pete", plus the bonus short "Artie's Workout". (with an accompanying "Petunia" Tattoo)
- "School Dazed" – Includes the episodes "Day of the Dot" and "Tool and Die", plus the bonus short "StareMaster" (with an accompanying "Magic Motion Eyeball Card").
- "Farewell, My Little Viking" – Includes both parts of the story, edited into one long episode. Also includes the short "Artie, the Strongest Man in the World".

=== DVD ===
The DVDs were released by Paramount Home Entertainment.

Season Releases

Broadcast season	Release date	Episodes	Specials	Commentary tracks
Season 1	May 17, 2005	All 8 from season one	"Valentine's Day Massacre" "What We Did On Our Summer Vacation" "Apocalypse Pete" "New Year's Pete"	"What We Did on Our Summer Vacation" "Day of the Dot" "The Nightcrawlers"
Season 2	November 1, 2005	All 13 from season two	"Space, Geeks and Johnny Unitas"	"Halloweenie" "Yellow Fever" "Farewell, My Little Viking" (both parts)
Season 3	Was originally scheduled for release February 28, 2006. However, after the merger between DreamWorks and Paramount Pictures, the third season was removed from Paramount's schedule.	All 13 from season three	N/A	N/A According to co-creators Will McRobb and Chris Viscardi the season three DVDs were actually pressed and are sitting in a warehouse. In a LA Times article they discussed the situation. McRobb said, "The same thing goes on with the mythical third season on DVD. They put out the first two and everyone's thrilled, and the third one doesn't come out, and no one has ever told us why. And they made it, it's in the warehouse." Viscardi added, "It's packaged, it's recorded, we did commentary tracks with a bunch of the cast, there's all these special extras on it. They pressed them, we saw it. Nothing."

== Broadcast ==
The Adventures of Pete & Pete first ran on Nickelodeon from 1993 to 1996. Reruns continued to air from 1996 to 1999, and again from 2003 to 2004 on U-Pick Live. It also aired reruns on Noggin's teen block, The N, from 2002 to 2003. In Canada, it aired on the Family Channel in the early 2000s.

In 2011, The Adventures of Pete & Pete was one of the series mentioned as a potential future series that would air on TeenNick's retro block, The '90s Are All That. Despite images of the show appearing in the often-shown The '90s Are All That commercial promos, no episodes of the series aired on the block at the time. The 1989 shorts began airing on the block in 2013. When the block expanded into The Splat (now NickSplat) in 2015, Pete & Pete was listed as part of the block's lineup, but had yet to be scheduled (only the shorts aired on the block during this time).

On May 28, 2017, it was announced that Mike Maronna and Danny Tamberelli would take part in a weekend-long event on NickSplat called "The Adventures of Pete & Pete: The Strongest Reunion in the World" on June 17 and 18, where classic episodes were replayed while they share various moments from making the series.

== Reunion ==
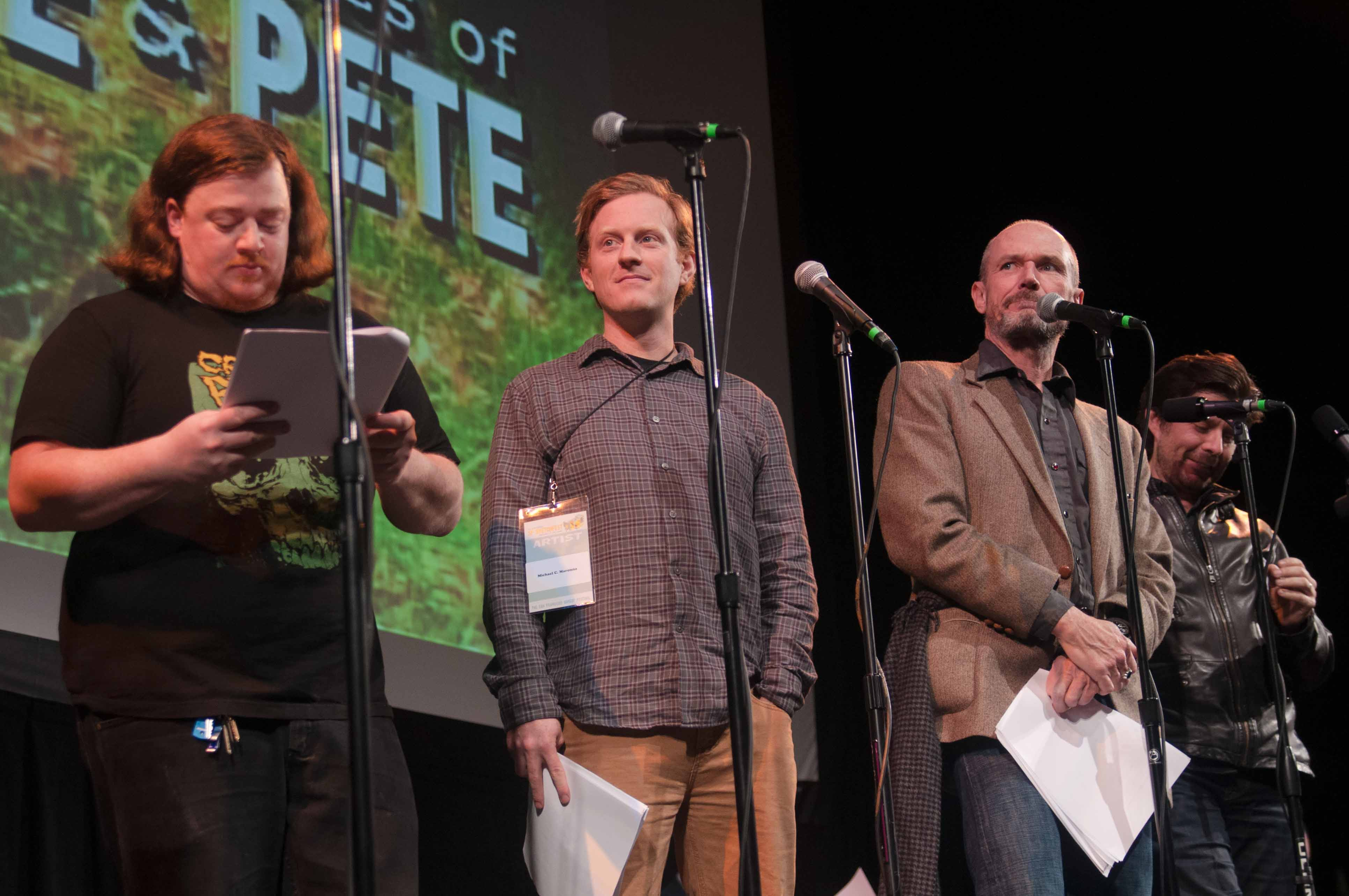
From left to right: Danny Tamberelli, Michael C. Maronna, Toby Huss, and Rick Gomez during the "Pete & Pete Forever" reunion at SF Sketchfest 2016, in San Francisco, United States

In late 2011 and early 2012 a series of cast and crew reunions took place in Los Angeles and New York City respectively. Tamberelli, Syd Straw and Marshall Crenshaw performed a rendition of the theme song "Hey Sandy" in addition to other Pete & Pete compositions. Creators McRobb, Viscardi, along with Michael Maronna, Hardy Rawls, Judy Grafe, Alison Fanelli, Toby Huss, and director Katherine Dieckmann were all in attendance.

The 2011 Los Angeles reunion was billed by the Cinefamily as the "KrebStar Film Festival", a reference to the show's own brand. Additionally, many products from the show were available, including Krebex, Kreb Scouts, KrebStore 24 and Krebgate Toothpaste. Staff members also handed out "performance-enhanced" Orange Lazarus.

Since September 2013, Danny Tamberelli and Michael Maronna released a monthly podcast, The Adventures of Danny and Mike, on the Seltzer Kings podcast network and hosted by Jeremy Balon. The three also tour with their stage show Nostalgia Personified. Tamberelli and Maronna have remained close friends since the end of the series.
