= The Backyard (EP) =

EP by Miracle Legion
- Released: 1984
- Recorded: Presence Studios
- Genre: College rock, alternative rock
- Length: 26:09
- Label: Rough Trade Records

Miracle Legion chronology
A Simple Thing (1983)	The Backyard (1984)	Surprise Surprise Surprise (1987)

The Backyard is the second release by the American alternative rock band Miracle Legion, released in 1984 on Rough Trade Records.

== Release ==
Released on both 12" vinyl and cassette, the six song EP The Backyard was recorded at Presence Studios and released under Rough Trade Records in 1984. (Note: Information provided by The Backyards liner notes.) The songs were composed by Mark Mulcahy and Ray Neal.

The eponymous title track "The Backyard" became a staple on college radio charts following its release, and there was a music video for it which received regular rotation on MTV. The lyrics to "The Backyard" focus on Mulcahy's youth.

A tribute album to Mulcahy, Ciao My Shining Star: The Songs of Mark Mulcahy, was released in 2009 by Shout! Factory and features a cover of "The Backyard" by alternative rock band Dinosaur Jr.

== Reception ==
Professional ratings
Review scores
Source	Rating
Allmusic	4/5 stars
Robert Christgau	B+

Drawing comparison to R.E.M., the record received much acclaim. Music critic Robert Christgau writing positively on Mulcahy's lyrics says that they are of "dazzled childhood and yearning adolescence," and likens the vocals to Loudon Wainwright III. The album has been called a "landmark" by Trouser Press, and calls the title track "sheer brilliance."

== Track listing ==
Side one
No.	Title	Length
1.	"The Backyard"	4:01
2.	"Butterflies"	4:45
3.	"Closer To The Wall"	4:06

Side two
No.	Title	Length
4.	"Just Say Hello"	4:56
5.	"The Heart Is Attached"	4:14
6.	"Steven Are You There?"	4:07

== Personnel ==
- Joel Potocsky - bass guitar
- Mark Mulcahy - vocals
- Jeff Wiederschall - drums
- Ray Neal - guitar
