= Danny Tamberelli =

American actor and musician (born 1982)

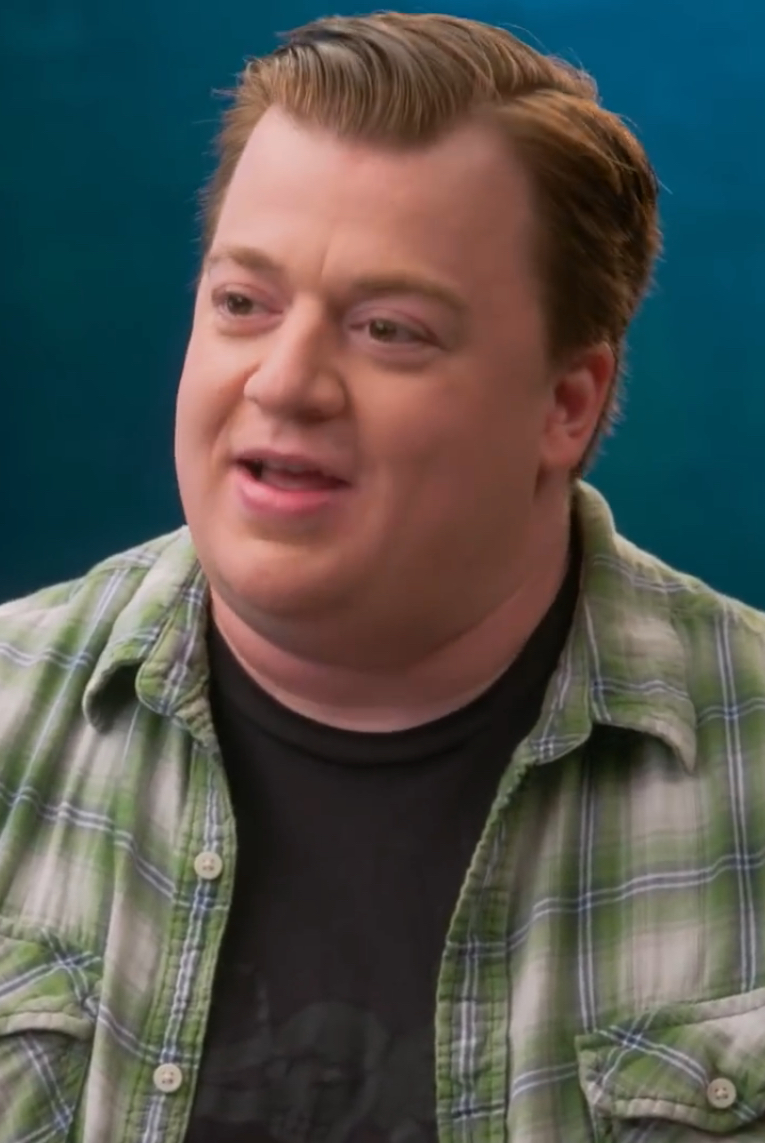
- Tamberelli in 2019
- Born: Daniel Tamberelli; February 8, 1982 (age 44)
- Occupations: Actor; musician
- Years active: 1986–present
- Spouse: Katelyn Detweiler (m. 2018)
- Children: 2
- Website: dannytamberelli.com

Danny Tamberelli (born February 8, 1982) is an American actor and musician. He is known for his portrayal of Little Pete Wrigley in The Adventures of Pete & Pete from 1989 to 1996 and for his work as a cast member of the Nickelodeon sketch comedy series All That from 1997 to 2000. He is also known for his portrayal of Jimmy De Santa in Grand Theft Auto V (2013), Grand Theft Auto Online (2019) and Grand Theft Auto VI (2026).

== Early life and education ==
Tamberelli was raised in Maywood, New Jersey and moved to Wyckoff, New Jersey, where he attended Ramapo High School, graduating in 2000. Tamberelli is a graduate of Hampshire College, where he earned a bachelor's degree in interdisciplinary arts focusing on music performance and booking management.

== Career ==
Tamberelli's first performance was in a Huggies commercial, according to a 1994 interview. His first regular television role, at age 4, was as Sean Novak on the ABC daytime soap opera Ryan's Hope. He originally appeared from 1986 to 1987, when his character, along with his on-screen parents, were written off the show. However, he returned to the role in the fall of 1988 when the Novak family was brought back, to help close up storylines in preparation for the Ryan's Hope finale in January 1989.

Afterwards, Tamberelli played Jackie Rodowsky on the television series The Baby-Sitters Club. It was around this time that he was cast as Little Pete Wrigley on The Adventures of Pete & Pete, which first began as a series of 60-second shorts on Nickelodeon in 1989. After progressing to a batch of specials, Pete & Pete became a regular half-hour sitcom in 1993, and brought Tamberelli more recognition. During his time in the show, he met the musicians Iggy Pop and Mark Mulcahy, who inspired him to become a musician too; Iggy would teach him how to play the song "T.V. Eye" (from The Stooges' album Fun House) on bass in between breaks, when Tamberelli was 11. Around that time he provided the voice for Arnold in The Magic School Bus, as well as appearing in the films Igby Goes Down and The Mighty Ducks. He was also on Nickelodeon's All That from 1997 to 2000 and Figure It Out from 1997 to 1999, and guest starred in the Space Cases episode "All You Can Eaty". In the 2013 video game Grand Theft Auto V, he provided the voice and motion capture for Jimmy De Santa, and ended up reprising the role in the 2026 sequel game Grand Theft Auto VI.

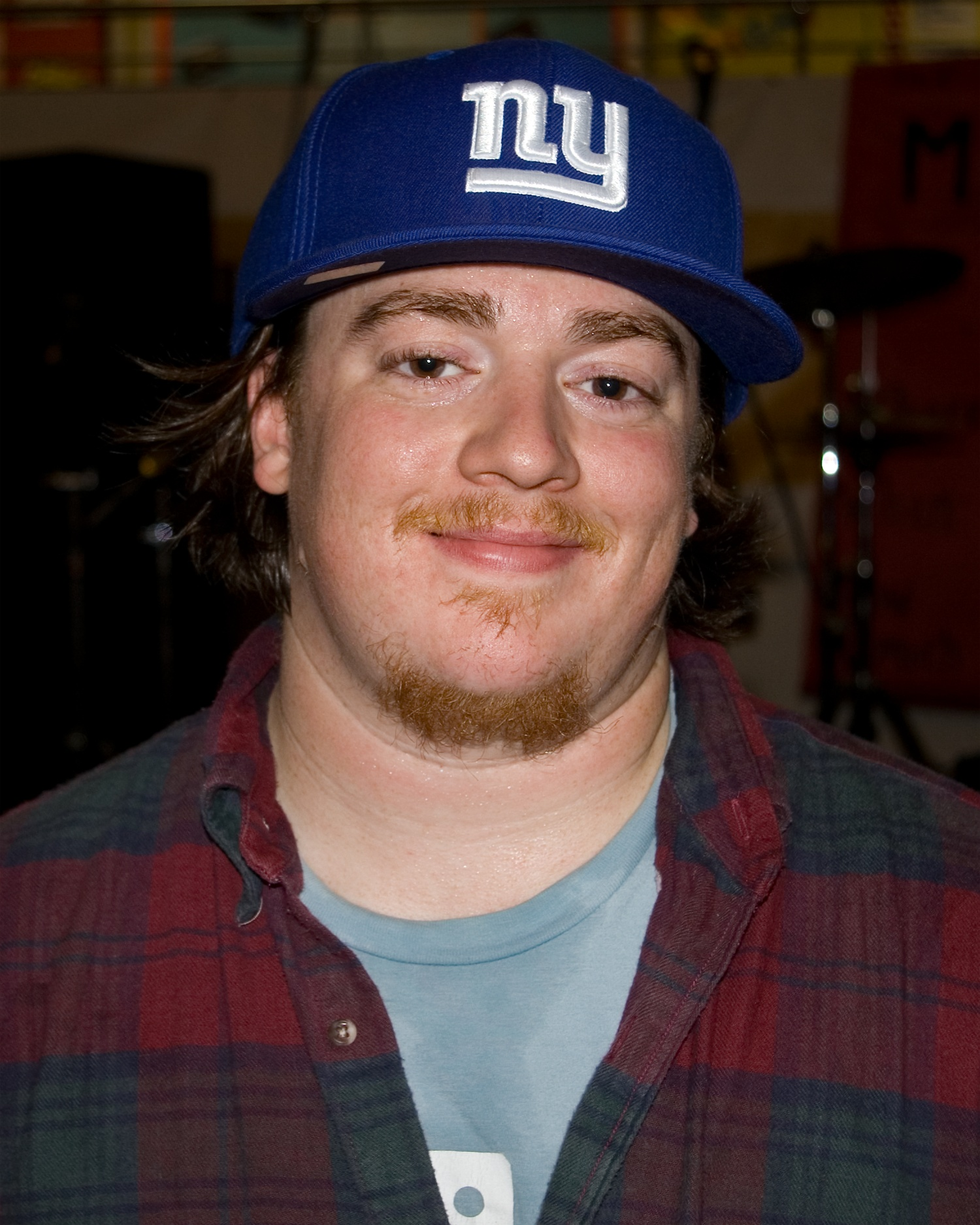
Tamberelli in October 2008

Tamberelli is the bassist and vocalist for the rock band Jounce, formed in Northern New Jersey. They started in the early 2000s as a jazz funk quartet, but their sound later evolved into "90s music-inspired post-punk". They released an eponymous debut album on July 18, 2006, followed by their sophomore effort, These Things on March 31, 2009. The EP titled Meet Me in the Middle was released digitally on April 4, 2011. As of 2016, the only remaining members from the original formation were Tamberelli and childhood friend and guitarist Matt DeSteno. Tamberelli was also the bassist for the folk/pop band Every Good Boy.

In 2013, he started a podcast with former The Adventures of Pete and Pete co-star Michael C. Maronna. He is also a founding member of the sketch comedy group Manboobs, along with Jeremy Balon. In May 2024, he and his wife Kate Tamberelli published their book The Road Trip Rewind.

== Personal life ==
Tamberelli married author Katelyn Detweiler in early 2018 and they have two children, a son born in 2019, and a daughter born in 2022.

== Filmography ==
=== Film ===
Year	Title	Role	Notes
1992	The Mighty Ducks	Tommy Duncan	Nominated – Young Artist Award for Outstanding Young Ensemble Cast in a Motion Picture
1993	The Adventures of Huck Finn	Ben Rodgers	Credited as Daniel Tamberelli
1993	Josh and S.A.M.	Red Haired Kid #2	Credited as Daniel Tamberelli
1996	Kids for Character	Arnold Perlstein	Voice, direct-to-video
2002	Igby Goes Down	Turtle	
2023	Good Burger 2	Himself	Cameo
2024	I Saw the TV Glow	Neighbor #2	

=== Television ===
Year	Title	Role	Notes
1986–1989	Ryan's Hope	Sean Novak	Recurring role, 11 episodes
1990	Alexander and the Terrible, Horrible, No Good, Very Bad Day	Alexander	Voice, television special; credited as Daniel Tamberelli
1990	The Baby-Sitters Club	Jackie Rodowsky	Recurring role, 9 episodes; credited as Daniel Tamberelli
1992–1996	The Adventures of Pete & Pete	Little Pete Wrigley	Lead role
1994	Law & Order	Jeffrey	Episode: "Nurture"; credited as Daniel Tamberelli
1995–1997	The Magic School Bus	Arnold Perlstein	Voice, main role; credited as Daniel Tamberelli
1997–1999	Figure It Out	Himself	Panelist (seasons 1–4)
1997–2000	All That	Himself / various	Main role (seasons 4–6)
1999–2000	100 Deeds for Eddie McDowd	Spike Cipriano	Recurring role (season 1), 8 episodes
2000	The Amanda Show	Stop Motion Danny	Voice role; 1 episode
2002–2004	Fillmore!	Joseph Anza	Voice, recurring role

=== Video games ===
Year	Title	Role	Notes
2013	Grand Theft Auto V	Jimmy De Santa	Voice and motion-capture
2019	Grand Theft Auto Online	Jimmy De Santa	Voice; "The Diamond Casino Heist" update
2026	Grand Theft Auto VI	Jimmy De Santa	Voice and motion-capture
