= Will McRobb and Chris Viscardi =

American screenwriters

Will McRobb and Chris Viscardi are American television creators, writers, producers, and screenwriters. They are best known as the co-creators of the Nickelodeon television series The Adventures of Pete & Pete.

After the success of Pete & Pete, McRobb was assigned to work on Nicktoons. He worked with Jumbo Pictures on Doug and served as story editor on The Ren & Stimpy Show, one of the most challenging periods of his career. He acted as a voice of reason between Nickelodeon executives and series creator John Kricfalusi, who viewed him as an obstacle to the series' creative process. Despite this tension, McRobb was highly influential in the production of the first two seasons, approving plots for critically acclaimed episodes such as "Svën Höek" and "Man's Best Friend" while writing the episode "Black Hole". Bob Camp considered him important to the series, noting that he provided constructive advice and improved on Kricfalusi's often overly crass ideas while receiving little credit. In 1996, the duo, through his production company, Wellsville Pictures, had signed with Walt Disney Television, but no work had ever came out of the deal.

McRobb went on to co-create KaBlam! and Radio Free Roscoe, and served as co-executive producer on Sanjay and Craig from 2013 to 2016. In 2020, he became executive producer on two animated series for Apple TV+: Harriet the Spy, an adaptation of the coming-of-age novel about a rebellious 11-year-old girl in 1960s New York City, and El Deafo, based on the Newbery Award-winning graphic memoir about a young girl who loses her hearing at age five.

McRobb and Viscardi collaborated as executive producers and writers on Costume Quest, an animated children's series that premiered on Amazon in 2018, and Click, Clack, Moo: Christmas at the Farm, an animated Christmas special that premiered in December 2017. McRobb was also a writer on the 2007 film Alvin and the Chipmunks.

Viscardi served as senior vice president of Nickelodeon Animation Studio until Ramsey Naito succeeded him. He remains at the network as a producer overseeing feature-length animated content, and co-wrote The Loud House Movie with Kevin Sullivan and Plankton: The Movie with Mr. Lawrence and Kaz.

== Work ==
=== Television ===
Title	Role	Network	Premiere	Ended
The Adventures of Pete & Pete	Co-creators, executive producers, writers	Nickelodeon	November 28, 1993	December 28, 1996
Inside-Out Boy	Creator, writer (Will McRobb)	Nickelodeon	1990	1992
Doug	Story Editor (Will McRobb)	Nickelodeon/ABC	Nickelodeon series: August 11, 1991; ABC series: September 7, 1996	Nickelodeon series: January 2, 1994; ABC series: June 26, 1999
The Ren & Stimpy Show	Story Editor, writer (Will McRobb)	Nickelodeon	August 11, 1991	October 20, 1996
KaBlam!	Co-creators, executive producers, writers	Nickelodeon	October 1, 1996	January 22, 2000
The War Next Door	Co-creators, executive producers, writers	USA Network	July 23, 2000	September 24, 2000
Radio Free Roscoe	Creator (Will McRobb)	The N	August 1, 2003	May 25, 2005
The Assistants	Co-creators, executive producers, writers, executive producers	The N	July 10, 2009	September 11, 2009
Sanjay and Craig	Executive producers, writers	Nickelodeon	May 25, 2013	July 29, 2016
Costume Quest	Executive producer (Will McRobb)	Amazon Prime Video	March 8, 2019	November 21, 2019
Harriet the Spy	Developer, executive producer (Will McRobb)	Apple TV	November 19, 2021	May 5, 2023
El Deafo	Executive producer, writer (Will McRobb)	Apple TV	January 7, 2022	

==== Television movies ====
TV movie	Television series	Role	Network	Premiere date	DVD release date
"Battle of the Bands"	The Naked Brothers Band	Writers	Nickelodeon	October 6, 2007	September 4, 2007
Albert	N/A	Co-executive producers, writers	Nickelodeon	December 9, 2016	November 14, 2017

=== Specials ===
Title	Role	Distributors	Premiere date
Backyard Sports: The Animated Special	Additional writing (Will McRobb)	YouTube	January 29, 2026

=== Films ===
Title	Role	Distributors	Premiere date
Snow Day	Screenwriters	Paramount Pictures and Nickelodeon Movies	February 11, 2000
Alvin and the Chipmunks	Screenwriters	20th Century Fox	December 14, 2007
Angus, Thongs and Perfect Snogging	Screenwriters	Paramount Pictures and Nickelodeon Movies	July 25, 2008
The Tale of Despereaux	Story	Universal Pictures	December 19, 2008
The Loud House Movie	Producer; Screenwriter (Chris Viscardi)	Nickelodeon Movies; Netflix	August 20, 2021
Plankton: The Movie	Screenwriter (Chris Viscardi)	Nickelodeon Movies; Netflix	March 7, 2025

=== Web series ===
Title	Role	Distributors	Premiere	Ended
Bravest Warriors	Developers, executive producers (seasons 1–3)	Cartoon Hangover	November 8, 2012	December 24, 2018

=== Music video ===
Song	Band	Role	Notes	Premiere
Water Underground	Real Estate	Executive producers	Music video tribute to The Adventures of Pete & Pete featuring original cast members Michael C. Maronna and Danny Tamberelli.	November 27, 2023
