= Mark Mulcahy =

American singer-songwriter

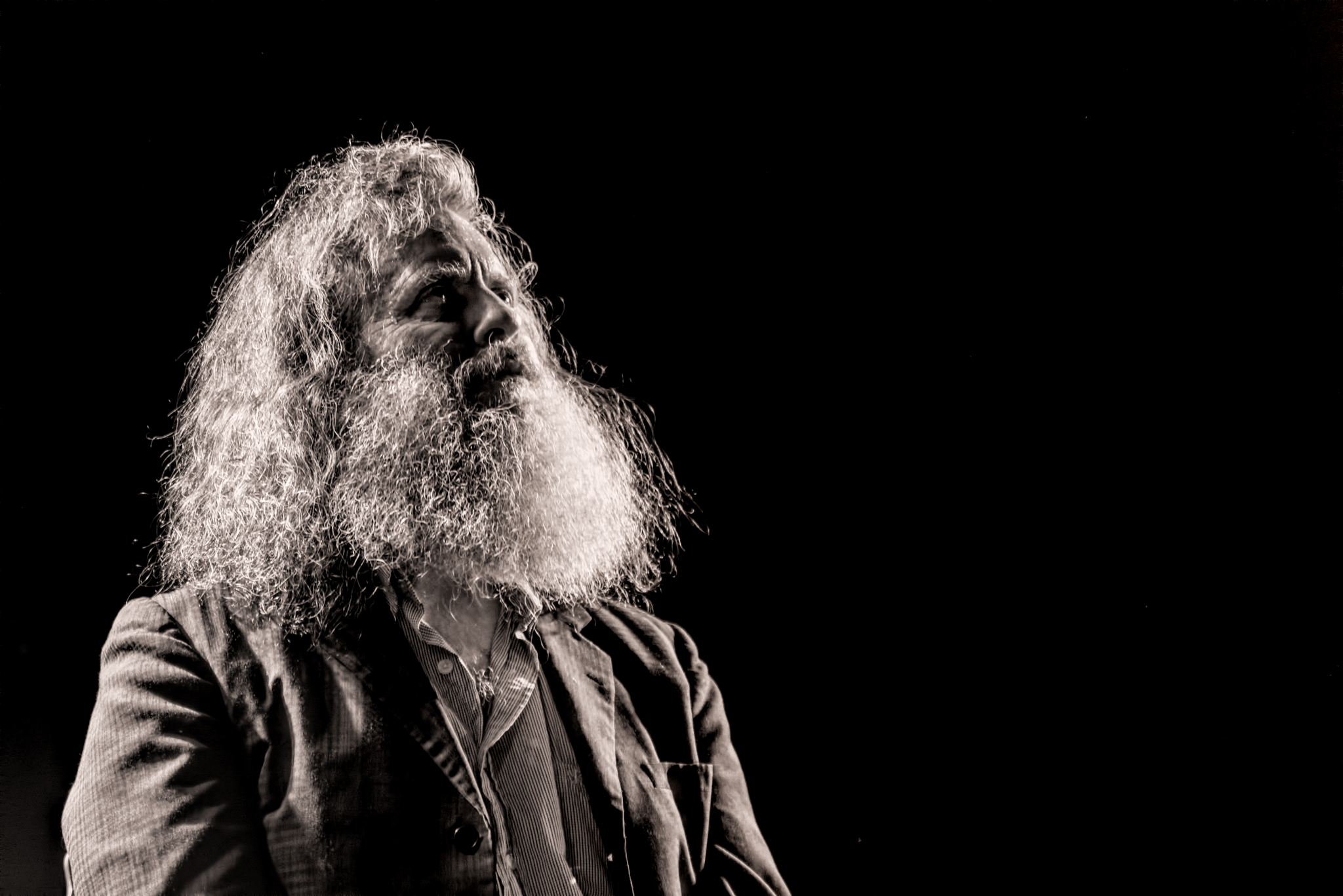
Mark Mulcahy performing at The Chapel in San Francisco, California in 2017.

Mark Mulcahy is an American musician. He was the front-man for the New Haven, Connecticut-based band Miracle Legion. The band earned modest renown, especially in their native New England region. Mulcahy soon formed Polaris, a house band for the mid-1990s alternative television series The Adventures of Pete & Pete (1993–1996). They are best remembered for the song "Hey Sandy" featured in the opening credits of each show, and for nostalgic tunes such as "Waiting for October" and "Saturnine". Following the cancellation of Pete & Pete, Mulcahy began playing his own shows in New York City and rebuilding his career. Mulcahy has opened for notable artists, including Oasis and Jeff Buckley and received homage from Radiohead frontman Thom Yorke, who dedicated a song to Mulcahy at a Boston show.

An essay on Mulcahy's song "Hey Self-Defeater" (from the album Fathering) was featured in Nick Hornby's book Songbook.

In 2003, Mulcahy was invited to sing a Haiku poem, "Haiku Three In The Museum Garden", by Nobel laureate George Seferis, on the international release of electronica band Sigmatropic Sixteen Haiku & Other Stories. A subsequent limited edition 12-inch by Sigmatropic the following year, Could That Be The Voice? (Tongue Master Records), featured Mulcahy on two featured alternate remixes, "Haiku One" and "Haiku Four", as well as contributions by Edith Frost & Carla Torgerson (The Walkabouts).

Mulcahy composed the music for and performed in Ben Katchor's 2004 musical, The Slug Bearers of Kayrol Island, or, The Friends of Dr. Rushower. Mulcahy also co-wrote the musical The Rosenbach Company with Katchor.

Mulcahy recorded a cover version of Shania Twain's "From This Moment On" for Engine Room Recordings' compilation album Guilt by Association, which was released in September 2007.

His song "Cookie Jar" was used in the 2008 movie Management over the closing credits.

A tribute album titled Ciao My Shining Star: The Songs of Mark Mulcahy was released on September 15, 2009, featuring contributions from Thom Yorke, Frank Black, The National, Dinosaur Jr., Michael Stipe, Juliana Hatfield, Mercury Rev, David Berkeley, Frank Turner. The album also serves as a benefit for Mulcahy, whose wife Melissa died in 2008.

Mulcahy re-emerged in 2012 with a reunion show with Polaris at Cinefamily's Everything is Festival III on August 28. Following the performance, a Twitter and Facebook page for Polaris appeared. Mulcahy played a four-date tour in England in early December, including a performance at the All Tomorrow's Parties festival. In addition, Mulcahy's single "Low Birthweight Child/The Cottage That We Rented Had a Name" was released on December 10 by the UK-based Tongue Master Records. In 2013, he released his first full-length album in eight years, Dear Mark J. Mulcahy, I Love You, and undertook a minor tour in the U.S. Mulcahy appeared on J Mascis', Tied to a Star (2014), singing on two tracks.

Miracle Legion was reformed in 2016–2017.

== Partial discography ==
- Fathering (1997) CD on the Mezzotint Label/Loose Music
- C.O.D. (1999) 7-inch vinyl on Lissy Records
- I Just Shot Myself in the Foot Again (2000) EP on Mezzotint
- Smilesunset (2001) CD/LP on Mezzotint/Loose Music
- In Pursuit of Your Happiness (2005) CD on Mezzotint/Loose Music
- Love's the Only Thing That Shuts Me Up (2005) EP on Mezzotint
- Low Birthweight Child ‘ | ‘The Cottage That We Rented Had a Name (2012) - 7-inch vinyl on Tongue Master Records
- Dear Mark J Mulcahy, I Love You (2013) on Fire Records/Mezzotint
- The Possum in the Driveway (2017) on Mezzotint
- The Gus (2019) on Mezzotint
- Franks And A Flag (2020) on Mezzotint
