= All That season 8 =

All That
- Season 8
- Starring: Chelsea Brummet; Jack DeSena; Lisa Foiles; Bryan Hearne; Shane Lyons; Giovonnie Samuels; Jamie Spears; Kyle Sullivan
- No. of episodes: 14

Release
- Original network: Nickelodeon
- Original release: September 21, 2002 – July 26, 2003

Season chronology
- ← Previous; Season 7 Next → Season 9

All That's eighth season ran from September 21, 2002, to July 26, 2003, and serves as the second season of the relaunch era. This season contained 14 episodes, as well as four special episodes looking for a new cast member to join the series.

The show saw many changes before the start of the season. Since season 7 was more of an experiment season, producers knew what worked and what didn't work with the show. Pickle Boy was taken out and only shown on rare occasions, and a formal green room was introduced. Like the first six seasons, the cast would start the show in the green room before starting the show. The intro was the same as the previous season, but with Spears edited in.

The entire cast from last season returned for their second on the show. Producers added Jamie Lynn Spears (credited as "Jamie Spears"), the younger sister of pop singer Britney Spears, to the cast, due to her interest in being on the show. Claims of nepotism arose from this, and ironically, Britney Spears would show up and host and perform in this season.

This would be the final season for Bryan Hearne. It was initially reported that Hearne wished to leave the show so he could focus on his music career, however, in the 2024 docuseries Quiet on Set: The Dark Side of Kids TV, it was revealed he had actually been fired due to conflicts between his mother and producers.

This is also the first season when the cast began to perform the SNICK On-Air Dare during the SNICK lineup. After the season ended, producers wanted to switch things up when looking for new cast members for the following season resulting in Nickelodeon holding a contest called "R U All That?: Nickelodeon's Search for the Funniest Kid in America" to find a new cast member.

== Cast ==
Repertory players

- Chelsea Brummet
- Jack DeSena
- Lisa Foiles
- Bryan Hearne
- Shane Lyons
- Giovonnie Samuels
- Jamie Spears
- Kyle Sullivan

== Episodes ==
No. overall	No. in season	Title	Original release date	Prod. code
133	1	"B2K"	September 21, 2002	825
Green Room - Meet Jamie: The cast is searching for a new cast member they are having tryouts in the greenroom Jamie Lynn Spears comes in and is trying to impress the cast with her superpowers since that didn't work she takes out a wad of cash and the cast welcomes her.; Bridgett’s Slumber Party: Three Potential Girlfriends for Elliot; Advice from the Old Lady in Shane's Mouth; Story Time with the Osbournes: The Three Little Pigs; Bucketman: Jewelry Store Robbery; Know Your Stars: The three "facts" about Jamie Spears are that she's an only child, stole a dress, and has a full beard.; The Old Lady in Shane's Mouth introduces "B2K"; Musical Guest: B2K ("Why I Love You"); (First episode to feature Jamie Spears)
134	2	"Buddy Hackett/Phyllis Diller/Daryl Sabara & Alexa Vega / Play featuring Chris Trousdale"	September 28, 2002	826
Green Room - Very Old Interaction: A very old cast member shows up in the All That greenroom.; Taxi Cab: Spy Kids; Thelma Stump: Jack De Sena; Randy Quench Volunteer Fireman: Birthday Party; Know Your Stars: Daryl Sabara & Alexa Vega; Randy Quench (Jack De Sena) introduces "Play & Chris Trousdale"; Musical Guest: Play featuring Chris Trousdale ("I'm Gonna Make You Love Me"); Guest Stars: Alexa Vega, Daryl Sabara, Phyllis Diller, and Buddy Hackett (as Knubby McFarlin "The Really Old Cast Member")
135	3	"Yasmeen"	October 5, 2002	827
Green Room - Hamster Mind Control: Chelsea reads a book on controlling the hamster's mind but she ends up controlling Shane's mind.; Sugar & Coffee: Buzz and Kaffy start to freak out when the orbs aren’t working.; Connect the Zits: Duck; Trashin' Fashion: School Cafeteria; Know Your Stars: The three "facts" about Bryan Hearne are that his favorite food is the potato, tickled an octopus one time, and his butt is also a radio.; Story Time with the Osbournes: Rip Van Winkle; Bridgett, Gail, and Claudia introduce "Yasmeen"; Musical Guest: Yasmeen ("Blue Jeans")
136	4	"Jeffrey Licon / Jennifer Love Hewitt"	October 12, 2002	828
Green Room - Jack, Kyle, and Bryan buy a hot tub; Bridgett's Slumber Party; Rate the Pain: A Brass Bell; Shane VS Things: A Toilet; Rowdy Fans: Dinner Date; Vocabulary with Lisa: “Stick” and “Thumb”; Know Your Stars: The three "facts" about Jeffrey Licon are that he's the star of SpongeBob SquarePants, was the first man to walk on the moon, and has an imaginary friend named Rumplepuss.; Hair Salon Guy introduces "Jennifer Love Hewitt"; Musical Guest: Jennifer Love Hewitt ("Barenaked"); Guest Star: Jeffrey Licon
137	5	"Steve Bridges / Tom Green / Avril Lavigne"	October 26, 2002	830
Green Room - Who’s Who?: The cast dresses up as each other for Halloween while Shane dresses as a ballerina.; Bridgett’s Slumber Party: Claudia’s House; Thelma Stump: George Bush (Steve Bridges); Bucketman: Fancy Restaurant; Know Your Stars: The three "facts" about Kyle Sullivan are that his head is shaped like a box, hasn't blinked in three years, and doesn't know that the announcer is his real mother.; Bryan introduces Avril; Musical Guest: Avril Lavigne ("Sk8er Boi"); Guest Stars: Tom Green (as mummy and himself) and Steve Bridges (as George W. Bush)
138	6	"3LW"	November 2, 2002	829
Green Room: Evil Jamie; Giovonnie, Jack, Chelsea, and Shane are suspicious that Jamie is evil when she throws her grape juice all over Giovonnie's new outfit, pulls out Chelsea's hair, and attacks Shane with his new model airplane. So, the cast prepares to get back at her until Jamie arrives and she's here to help. They figure out that she is real and the evil clone of herself is actually a monster.; Trashin' Fashion: School Hallway; What's for Dinner: Exploding Meatloaf; Rate the Pain: A Very Large Rock; The Max and Mr. Flopples Show: Max and Mr. Flopples meet 3LW; Know Your Stars: The two "facts" about Jack De Sena are that his name is French for "liver licker" and that he's dating the hottest girl in school. When Jack denies that fact, the announcer claims that Jack is "not as cool as I thought".; Thelma Stump introduces "3LW"; Musical Guest: 3LW ("I Do")
139	7	"Nick Carter/BBMak"	November 9, 2002	831
Green Room - Jack's Camera on Shane's Head: Jack installs a camera on Shane’s forehead, and he shows the cast what Shane does when he's not around.; Rowdy Fans: Operating Room; Vocabulary with Lisa: “Income” and “Cattle”; Wake Up Scene: Nick Carter; Chit Chat; Know Your Stars: The three "facts" about Jamie Spears are that she loves to chew raw meat, rides to work on a dolphin, and once punched a man just for snoring.; Sneaky Camera with Vance Lafoon; Stacey Chit introduces "BBMak"; Musical Guest: BBMak (“Out of My Heart”); Guest Star: Nick Carter
140	8	"Harry Bladder Special"	November 16, 2002	910
An episode that is a compilation of Harry Bladder-related sketches.
141	9	"Justin Timberlake / Aaron Carter"	November 23, 2002	832
Green Room - Jack's New Mustache: Jack gets a new mustache and the cast thinks of the fun things they can do with it.; Sugar & Coffee: A Plant Guy; Thelma Stump: Special Guest Justin Timberlake meets Thelma, but she will not let him by over a piece of bacon; Randy Quench: Wedding; Wake Up Scene: Justin Timberlake; Storytime with the Osbournes: Little Red Riding Hood; Know Your Stars: The three "facts" about Bryan Hearne are that he's captain of the All That chess team, has a voice only dogs can hear, and once ate his own head.; Hair Salon Guy introduces "Aaron Carter"; Musical Guest: Aaron Carter ("To All the Girls"); Guest Star: Justin Timberlake
142	10	"Britney Spears / Justincase"	January 18, 2003	833
Green Room - Alarm System: A man named Pal delivers a vat of pickles and installs a cheese cannon to the cast of All That.; Taxi Cab; Thelma Stump: Britney Spears; Connect the Zits: A Sailboat; Trashin' Fashion: School Dance; What's for Dinner: Exploding Lasagna; Know Your Stars: The three "facts" about Giovonnie Samuels are that she works in the zoo, loves to fill her pants up with peanut butter and dance, and she's fired from All That, though the announcer soon refutes that "fact", saying he decided to give her her job back.; Marlee and Carlee introduce "Justincase"; Musical Guest: Justincase ("Don’t Cry for Us"); Guest Star: Britney Spears
143	11	"Nick Cannon & Orlando Jones / Monica"	January 25, 2003	835
Green Room - Soda Explosion: While Bryan goes to sharpen his pencil to do his homework, the cast and Pickle Boy decide to play a prank on him by shaking up his soda can so that it would spray all over him. However, the prank soon backfires on the cast when the soda explodes in their faces after Bryan opens the soda can without the soda spraying all over him before he went to go sharpen his pencil again.; Tea & Crumpets vs. Sugar & Coffee: Wembly (Jack) and Fiona (Chelsea) interview the Queen of England during Tea & Crumpets until Buzz and Kaffy take over the show for Sugar & Coffee.; Thelma Stump: Nick Cannon and Orlando Jones; Rowdy Fans: Spaceship; Know Your Stars: After purposely mistaking Nick Cannon for Orlando Jones, the announcer reveals two "facts" about Cannon, that he tied Orlando Jones in his living room and thinks tying up movie stars is some kind of joke.; Thelma Stump introduces "Monica"; Musical Guest: Monica ("All Eyez on Me"); Guest Stars: Nick Cannon and Orlando Jones
144	12	"Steve Bridges as George W. Bush/Avril Lavigne"	February 1, 2003	834
Green Room - Bootcamp: A comedy drill instructor shows up and teaches the cast how to be funny. He flicks Shane's nose twice, makes Jamie do a poorly spit take, and makes Bryan pantsed down Kyle's pants. Pickle Boy shows ups and gets rid of the drill instructor after the drill instructor insults Pickle Boy.; All That Cribs: Lil' Fetus; Shane VS Things: A Football Team; Rate the Pain: A Mallet; Bucketman: Grocery Store; Vocabulary with Lisa: "Vacuum" and "Shame"; Know Your Stars: The three "facts" about Chelsea Brummet are that she's allergic to cats, can tie her own tongue in a knot, and the sound of her voice puts people to sleep.; Steve Bridges as George W. Bush introduces "Avril"; Musical Guest: Avril Lavigne ("Complicated")
145	13	"Matthew Lillard/O-Town"	February 15, 2003	836
Green Room - Fishing for Matthew Lillard: Jack, Kyle, and Jamie fish for Matthew Lillard.; Chit Chat; Advice from the Old Lady in Shane's Mouth; Connect the Zits: A Flower; Randy Quench: Hair Salon; Know Your Stars: The three "facts" about Lisa Foiles are that her last word rhymes with "persnikitty", keeps snacks in her bellybutton, and she just won $50 million, only for the announcer to claim that last "fact" was a lie and burst out laughing.; Maddy introduces "O-Town"; Musical Guest: O-Town ("I Showed Her"); Guest Star: Matthew Lillard
146	14	"Tom Green/No Secrets"	February 22, 2003	837
Green Room - Jamie's Time Machine: Jack and Giovonnie hop on Jamie's time-travel couch; Sugar and Coffee: Wanda Hubley/Tom Green; Shane VS Things: A Little Old Lady; Wake Up Scene: Tom Green eating an apple; Rate the Pain: Grandma in a Bikini; Bridgett’s Slumber Party: Cheerleading Squad; Story Time with the Osbournes: Goldilocks and the Three Bears; Know Your Stars: The three "facts" about Shane Lyons are that he has teeny, tiny feet, was created by scientists in a laboratory, and has mustard on his face.; Bucketman introduces "No Secrets"; Musical Guests: No Secrets ("That’s What Girls Do"); Guest Star: Tom Green; (Last episode to feature Bryan Hearne)

=== Special ===
Title	Subtitle	Original release date	Prod. code	K9−14 viewers (in millions)
"R U All That?"	Round 1	July 5, 2003	01A	N/A
"R U All That?"	Round 2	July 12, 2003	02A	N/A
"R U All That?"	Round 3	July 19, 2003	03A	N/A
"R U All That?"	Nickelodeon's Search for the Funniest Kid in America	July 26, 2003	N/A	0.83
Randy Quench: Rodney Quench Volunteer Jr. Fireman (Ryan Coleman); Trashin' Fashion: New Co-Host Charlee (Christina Kirkman); 2Gether 4Ever: John Hottie (Colton Gosselin); Bridgett's Slumber Party: Cahuenga Steins (Kendre Berry); Sugar & Coffee: Sugar and Sausage!: Queeshva (Stephanie Matto); The Finals- The current cast members began the finals of R U All That? Nick Cannon (via satellite) and Amanda Bynes are the judges. Finalist Christina Kirkman become the Winner and the Funniest Kid in America.
