= Michael Tollin =

American film director

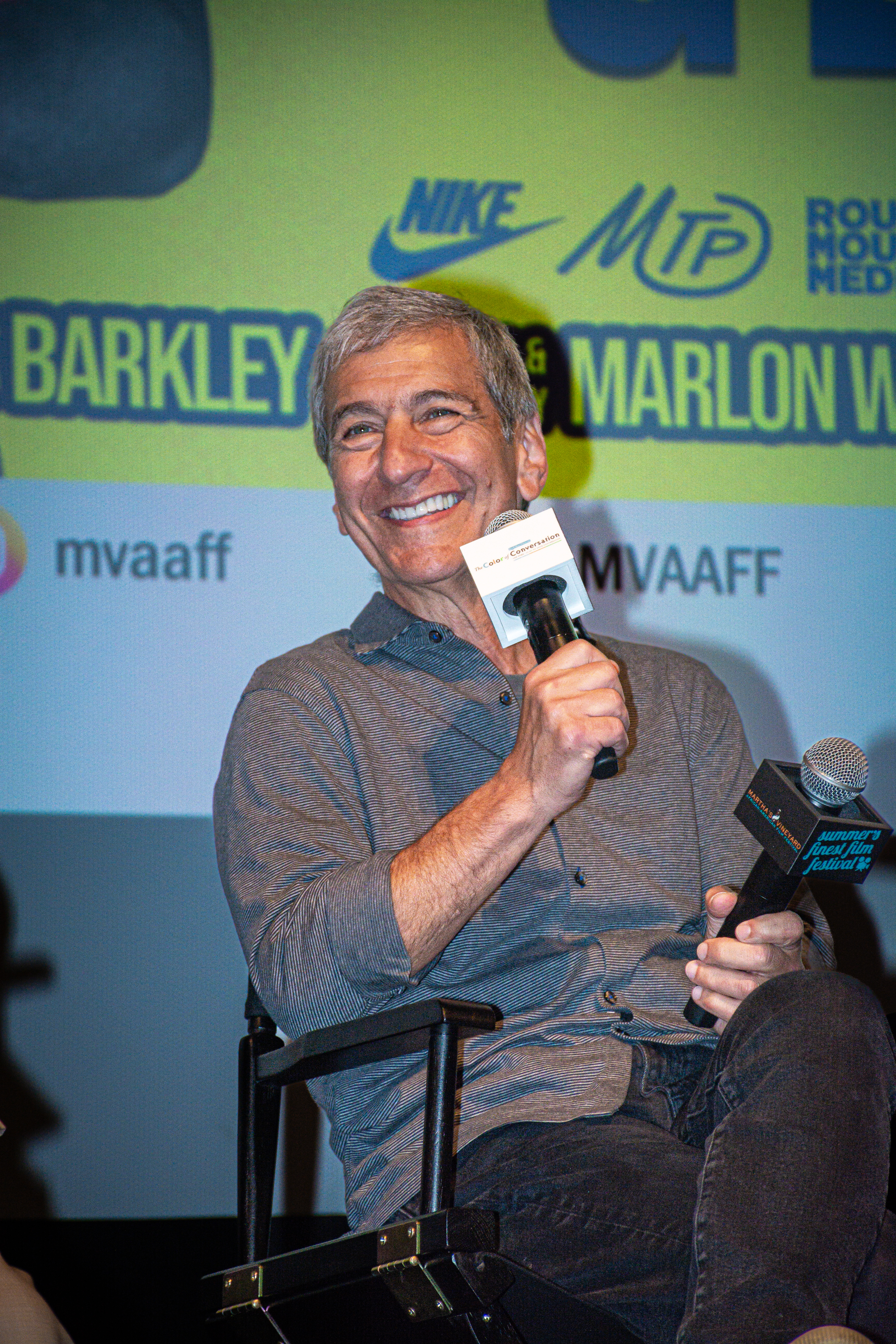
- Tollin in 2025
- Born: Philadelphia, Pennsylvania, U.S.
- Other name: Mike Tollin
- Occupations: Director, television producer
- Years active: 1982–present
- Children: 2

Michael Tollin is an American film and television producer/director who served as executive producer of the Emmy award-winning The Last Dance, a 10-part documentary series on Michael Jordan and the Chicago Bulls dynasty. The series received rave reviews and set numerous ratings records, being seen by nearly 15 million viewers per episode on ESPN and many million more on Netflix around the world.

Tollin's other career highlights include Radio, Coach Carter, Hank Aaron: Chasing the Dream, and Varsity Blues. He has also produced and/or directed such movies and television shows as Arli$$, Smallville, One Tree Hill, All That, Kenan & Kel, Summer Catch, Wild Hogs, Dreamer, Good Burger, Big Fat Liar, and The Bronx is Burning.

Tollin directed and/or produced documentaries, including The Comedy Store Documentary, Let Me Be Brave, Morningside Five, Iverson, Kareem: Minority of One, and Small Potatoes: Who Killed the USFL?. He is currently the co-chairman of Mandalay Sports Media.

== Early life and education ==
Michael Tollin grew up in Havertown, Pennsylvania, a suburb of Philadelphia. His father, Sol Tollin (1929–2006), played basketball and baseball for Haverford College from 1947 to 1951. Tollin has a passion for sports and remains fiercely loyal to his Philadelphia teams. Both Tollin and his father were inducted into the Philadelphia Jewish Sports Hall of Fame in 2009.

He attended Haverford High School and graduated from Stanford University in 1977, where he was a sports columnist and the play-by-play radio announcer for Stanford basketball.

== Career ==
After graduating from Stanford, Tollin's first job was producer/writer for a syndicated series of sports documentaries called Greatest Sports Legends. Within one year of his arrival, Tollin began directing the series. He went on to work with MLB Productions in New York and was one of the creators of an Emmy Award-winning series called The Baseball Bunch.

In 1980, he was the screenwriter of the official World Series film in which his favorite team, the Philadelphia Phillies, defeated the Kansas City Royals in six games. His script was narrated by Vin Scully.

In 1982, Tollin formed his own company, Halcyon Days Productions, and was awarded exclusive rights to the United States Football League, a spring pro football league which played from 1983 through 1985. Tollin later directed the ESPN 30 for 30 film, "Small Potatoes: Who Killed the USFL?" in which he and others associated with the USFL, notably former New Jersey Generals owner Donald Trump, offered a retrospective on the league (the title came from a quote from Trump). In addition to its work on the USFL, Halcyon Days Productions also produced sports documentaries, children's shows and entertainment specials. After the fall of the USFL, he moved to California and joined Brian Robbins to found Tollin/Robbins Productions. In 1993, the duo produced their first documentary together Hardwood Dreams, which won the Crystal Heart award at the 1993 Heartland Film Festival.

Over the next 15 years Tollin and Robbins teamed up to direct and produce more than a dozen feature films, award-winning documentaries and hundreds of hours of television. Some of Tollin/Robbins highlights include the films Varsity Blues, Coach Carter, Radio, Dreamer, Wild Hogs and Hardball; the television series Smallville, Arli$$ and One Tree Hill; as well as several award-winning documentaries, including Academy Award nominated Hank Aaron: Chasing the Dream, which Tollin wrote, produced and directed. In 2007, Robbins and Tollin decided to amicably split up the partnership both citing a desire to work on their own passion projects.

In 2012, Tollin partnered with Mandalay Entertainment chairman and CEO Peter Guber to form Mandalay Sports Media. MSM is a media and production company, the focus of which is sports entertainment programming for all media platforms. The company's portfolio runs the gamut from sports movies to scripted and unscripted series, documentaries, web series and branded content.

Tollin is the executive producer of The Last Dance, a 10-part documentary series on Michael Jordan and the Chicago Bulls dynasty. MSM/Tollin have also produced the motion pictures Chuck and The Zookeeper's Wife; the documentaries Iverson, Kareem: Minority of One, Fastball, Morningside 5, CounterPunch, The Franchise, and the Katy Perry Superbowl Halftime Special; and the TV series/specials Sin City Saints, Wedding Band, Summer Dreams, Every Street United, and Bluegrass Kingdom.

== Filmography ==
=== Executive producer ===
TV series

- 2026: Born to Bowl (TV miniseries) (executive producer, 5 episodes)
- 2022: The Captain (TV miniseries) (executive producer, 7 episodes)
- 2016: L.A. Clippers Dance Squad (TV series) (executive producer, 8 episodes)
- 2015-2016: Undrafted (TV series documentary) (executive producer, 7 episodes)
- 2015: Sin City Saints (TV series) (executive producer, 8 episodes)
- 2012-2015: 30 for 30 Shorts (TV documentary) (producer/executive producer, 3 episodes)
- 2012–2013: Wedding Band (TV series) (executive producer, 10 episodes)
- 2012: The Franchise: A Season with the Miami Marlins (TV series) (executive producer, 8 episodes)
- 2011: The Franchise: A Season with the San Francisco Giants (TV series) (executive producer, 9 episodes)
- 2009–2011: 30 for 30 (TV series) (consulting producer, 24 episodes, executive producer, 3 episodes)
- 2003–2012: One Tree Hill (TV series) (executive producer, 176 episodes)
- 2003–2004: I'm with Her (TV series) (executive producer, 21 episodes)
- 2003-2003: Black Sash (TV series) (executive producer, 5 episodes)
- 2002–2006: What I Like About You (TV series) (executive producer, 78 episodes)
- 2002–2003: Slamball (TV series) (executive producer)
- 2002: Birds of Prey (TV series) (executive producer)
- 2001–2002: The Nightmare Room (TV series) (executive producer, 8 episodes)
- 2001–2011: Smallville (TV series) (executive producer, 216 episodes)
- 2000–2001: The Amanda Show (TV series) (executive producer, 9 episodes)
- 1996–2002: Arli$$ (TV series) (executive producer, 80 episodes)
- 1994–2005; 2019–2020: All That (TV series) (executive producer)

Feature films, TV movies & unscripted TV series

- 2020: The Last Dance (documentary series) (executive producer)
- 2020: The Comedy Store Documentary (documentary series) (executive producer)
- 2019: The Comedy Store Documentary (documentary series, in production) (executive producer)
- 2018: The People's Fighters: Teofilo Stevenson and the Legend of Cuban Boxing (TV movie documentary) (executive producer)
- 2018: Walk-Off Stories: Improbably Gibson (documentary) (producer)
- 2018: WeTown (documentary) (executive producer)
- 2018: The Nagano Tapes: Rewound, Replayed & Reviewed (documentary) (executive producer)
- 2017: Long Time Coming: A 1955 Baseball Story (documentary) (executive producer)
- 2017: Morningside 5 (documentary) (executive producer)
- 2017: CounterPunch (documentary) (producer)
- 2017: Bigger Fatter Liar (Video) (executive producer)
- 2017: The Zookeeper's Wife (executive producer)
- 2016: Chuck (film) (producer)
- 2016: Fastball (documentary) (producer)
- 2016: Patrick & Zo (documentary) (executive producer)
- 2016: Vice Sports (executive producer)
- 2015: Uncompromising: Kyrie Irving (documentary) (executive producer)
- 2015: Katy Perry: Making of the Pepsi Super Bowl Halftime Show (documentary) (executive producer)
- 2015: Kareem: Minority of One (documentary) (executive producer)
- 2014: Summer Dreams (documentary) (executive producer)
- 2014: Iverson (documentary) (executive producer)
- 2014: Every Street United (documentary) (executive producer)
- 2014: Carmelo Anthony: Made in New York (documentary) (executive producer)
- 2013: Bluegrass Kingdom: The Gospel of Kentucky Basketball (executive producer)
- 2012: On the Mat (documentary) (executive producer)
- 2012: Live with John Legend (TV special) (executive producer)
- 2011: Thumbs (TV movie documentary) (executive producer)
- 2011: The Real Rocky (TV movie) (producer)
- 2007: Norbit (executive producer)
- 2007: Wild Hogs (producer)
- 2007: Unstrung (documentary) (producer)
- 2007: The Bronx Is Burning (TV miniseries) (executive producer)
- 2006: Bonds on Bonds (TV series) (executive producer)
- 2006: Crumbs (TV series) (executive producer)
- 2005: Coach Carter (producer)
- 2005: Dreamer: Inspired by a True Story (producer)
- 2005: Inconceivable (TV series) (executive producer)
- 2004: The Perfect Score (producer)
- 2004: The Days (TV series) (executive producer)
- 2004: Hardwood Dreams: Ten Years Later (TV movie documentary) (producer)
- 2003: Radio (producer)
- 2002: Big Fat Liar (producer)
- 2002: The Nick Cannon Show (TV series) (executive producer
- 2001: Summer Catch (producer)
- 2001: Hardball (producer)
- 2000: Ready to Rumble (executive producer)
- 1999: Varsity Blues (executive producer)
- 1998: Sports Theater with Shaquille O'Neal (TV series) (executive producer, 4 episodes)
- 1998: Cousin Skeeter (TV series) (executive producer)
- 1997: Good Burger (producer)
- 1996-2000: Kenan & Kel (TV series) (executive producer)
- 1995: Hank Aaron: Chasing the Dream (documentary) (executive producer)
- 1995: The Show (documentary) (producer)
- 1993: Hardwood Dreams (documentary) (executive producer, writer)
- 1988: The Final Season (documentary) (producer)
- 1986: Centennial: Over 100 Years of Philadelphia Phillies Baseball (Video)
- 1981: The Baseball Bunch (TV series documentary)
- 1978-79: Greatest Sports Legends (TV series)

=== Director ===
- 2017: Morningside 5 (documentary)
- 2009: 30 for 30 (documentary series) ("Small Potatoes: Who Killed the USFL?")
- 2007: Unstrung (documentary)
- 2003: Radio
- 2001: Summer Catch
- 1998: Cousin Skeeter (TV series)
- 1996: Arli$$ (TV series)
- 1995: Hank Aaron: Chasing the Dream (documentary)
- 1993: Hardwood Dreams (documentary)
- 1990: Let Me Be Brave (documentary)
- 1989: Buy Me That! A Kids' Survival Guide (TV special)
- 1988: The Final Season (documentary)
- 1987: Kids on Kids on Kids (TV special)
- 1986: Centennial: Over 100 Years of Philadelphia Phillies Baseball (video)
- 1982: The Baseball Bunch (TV series)

== Awards ==
Year	Film	Role	Notes
1985	This is the USFL	Director	Nominated – Sports Emmy Award for Best Sports Series
1987	Kids on Kids on Kids	Director	Nominated – CableACE award Magazine Show or Series
1991	Let Me Be Brave	Writer, producer, director	Sports Emmy Award for Special Class: Program Achievement
1993	Hardwood Dreams	Director, writer	Crystal Heart Award – Heartland Film Festival
1994	All That	Executive producer	Nominated – CableACE Award for Children's Series
1995	Hank Aaron: Chasing the Dream	Director, writer, producer	Peabody Award Winner; Nominated – Academy Award for Best Documentary Feature; Nominated – Emmy Award for Outstanding Informational Special; Crystal Heart Award – Heartland Film Festival
1997	Sports Theater with Shaquille O’Neal	Executive producer	CableACE Award for Children's Series
2003	Radio	Director	Character and Morality in Entertainment Award
2005	Coach Carter	Producer	Nominated – Black Movie Award for Outstanding Motion Picture; Nominated – Black Reel Award for Best Film
2007	The Bronx is Burning	Executive producer	Nominated – PGA Award for Outstanding Producer of Long-Form Television
2009	30 for 30	Consulting producer, executive producer	Peabody Award Winner; International Documentary Association's "Distinguished Continuing Series"; Emmy Award for Outstanding Short-Format Nonfiction Program
2011	The Franchise: A Season with the San Francisco Giants	Executive producer	Sports Emmy Award for Outstanding Edited Sports Series/Anthology
2012	30 for 30 Shorts	Executive producer, producer	Nominated – Sports Emmy Award for Outstanding New Approaches Sports Programing
2018	CounterPunch	Executive producer	Nominated – Sports Emmy Award for Outstanding Long Sports Documentary
2020	The Last Dance	Executive producer	Winner – Emmy Award for Outstanding Documentary or Nonfiction Series

== Personal life ==
Tollin shares season tickets for the Los Angeles Clippers with writer and podcaster Bill Simmons.
