= Bonds on Bonds =

- Created by: Mike Tollin
- Starring: Barry Bonds
- Narrated by: George Johnson
- Country of origin: United States
- No. of episodes: 10

Production
- Executive producers: Brian Robbins; Mike Tollin
- Running time: 30 minutes
- Production company: Tollin/Robbins Productions

Original release
- Network: ESPN
- Release: April 4 – May 30, 2006

Bonds on Bonds is a 2006 American 10-part reality television series starring former San Francisco Giants outfielder Barry Bonds that aired on ESPN. The show revolved on the life of Bonds and his chase of Babe Ruth and Hank Aaron's home run records. It was produced by Tollin/Robbins Productions.

== Segment breakdown ==
The first segment of Bonds on Bonds, aired Tuesday, April 4 nationwide on ESPN2. Much of the premiere episode dealt with how Bonds has coped with questions about whether steroids have fueled his athletic performance. At one point, Bonds even started to break down in tears. "If it makes them happy to go out of their way to try to destroy me, go right ahead. You can't hurt me any more than you've already hurt me," he said. He continued by saying, "You don't see me bringing anyone else into this. I'm going to take it myself." Bonds paused as his eyes welled and he choked back tears, "And I'm going to take it because there's so many people who depend on me."

In different segments throughout the program, Bonds acknowledged his often rocky relations with the press but cast himself as a victim of critics out to tear him down. He described himself as "mentally and emotionally drained" but insisted he was not going to let anyone "bring me down."

== Criticism and cancellation ==
ESPN was criticized for allowing Bonds such a one-sided public pulpit, as it was the most powerful name in American sports journalism; the show was seen by some as ESPN giving up any semblance of journalism in favor of becoming a public relations front for major sports teams and players. In June 2006, ESPN and producer Tollin/Robbins Productions officially pulled the plug on the reality series, citing "creative control" issues with star Barry Bonds and his representatives. No other details about the decision were given. Bonds on Bonds last aired May 30, 2006.
