= Klutch Academy =

2021 television documentary series

- Genre: Documentary
- Directed by: Michael Gleaton
- Starring: Brandon Boston Jr. Kai Jones; Jalen Johnson; Moses Moody; Jericho Sims; Scottie Lewis; Terrence Clarke
- Country of origin: United States
- Original language: English
- No. of series: 1
- No. of episodes: 5

Production
- Executive producers: Rich Paul; Fara Leff; Mike Tollin; Jon Weinbach; Kenya Barris; Tiffany Lea Williams; Michael Gleaton
- Producers: Rich Paul; Kenya Barris
- Cinematography: Gregory Kerrick
- Editor: Jeff Tober
- Production companies: Klutch Sports Group; BET Studios; Tollin Productions

Original release
- Network: BET
- Release: November 23 – December 21, 2021

Klutch Academy (also known as KLUTCH Academy) is an American five-part television documentary series which premiered on November 23, 2021 on BET.

== Cast ==
- Brandon Boston Jr.
- Kai Jones
- Jalen Johnson
- Moses Moody
- Jericho Sims
- Scottie Lewis
- Terrence Clarke

== Episodes ==
No.	Title	Directed by	Original release date	U.S. viewers (millions)
1	"Play for Play"	Michael Gleaton	November 23, 2021	0.24
2	"The Countdown Is On"	Michael Gleaton & Chase Kenney	November 30, 2021	0.22
3	"Coming Up Klutch"	Michael Gleaton	December 7, 2021	0.19
4	"Homecoming"	Michael Gleaton & Chase Kenney	December 14, 2021	0.21
5	"Night of Dreams"	Michael Gleaton	December 21, 2021	0.23
