= Wedding Band =

- Genre: Comedy drama
- Created by: Darin Moiselle; Josh Lobis
- Starring: Brian Austin Green; Peter Cambor; Jenny Wade; Derek Miller; Kathryn Fiore; Harold Perrineau; Melora Hardin
- Country of origin: United States
- Original language: English
- No. of seasons: 1
- No. of episodes: 10

Production
- Executive producers: Mike Tollin; Josh Lobis; Darin Moiselle; Matt Pyken
- Camera setup: Single camera
- Running time: 44 minutes
- Production companies: Tollin Productions; FremantleMedia North America

Original release
- Network: TBS
- Release: November 10, 2012 – January 19, 2013

Wedding Band is an American comedy drama television series starring Brian Austin Green, Harold Perrineau, Peter Cambor and Derek Miller. The series ran on TBS from November 10, 2012, to January 19, 2013, at 10 pm EST. It was created by Darin Moiselle and Josh Lobis. Despite positive reviews, TBS officially cancelled the series on January 22, 2013, after a single season, due to low ratings. It was the last project by Tollin/Robbins Productions until Klutch Academy in 2021.

== Plot ==
The series follows four friends who, despite their ups and downs, spend their spare time performing in a wedding band.

== Cast ==
- Brian Austin Green as Tommy
- Harold Perrineau as Stevie
- Derek Miller as Barry Wilson
- Peter Cambor as Eddie Wilson
- Jenny Wade as Rachel
- Kathryn Fiore as Det. Ingrid Wilson
- Melora Hardin as Roxie Rutherford

== Production ==
=== Development ===
The project first appeared on the development slate at TBS in May 2010. On October 20, 2010, TBS placed a pilot order on The Wedding Band, written by Darin Moiselle and Josh Lobis, who also serve as executive producers alongside Mike Tollin.

Casting announcements began in December 2010, with Brian Austin Green, Peter Cambor, Derek Miller and Harold Perrineau first cast; Green playing the role of Tommy; Cambor playing the role of Eddie; Miller playing Barry; and Perrineau in the role of Stevie. Kathryn Fiore and Jenny Wade were then cast, with Fiore playing Ingrid and Wade playing Rachel. Melora Hardin was the last actor cast in the series, she plays the role of Roxie Rutherford.

On May 11, 2011, TBS ordered The Wedding Band to series with a 10-episode order. Guest stars set to appear in season one include: Megan Fox, Wendi McLendon-Covey, Kurtwood Smith, Donald Faison, Ashley Williams and Molly Sims.

On January 22, 2013, Wedding Band was canceled by TBS, citing poor ratings.

== Episodes ==
No.	Title	Directed by	Written by	Original release date	U.S. viewers (millions)
1	"Pilot"	Bryan Gordon	Josh Lobis & Darin Moiselle	November 10, 2012	1.84
2	"I Love College"	Michael Patrick Jann	James Eagan	November 17, 2012	1.24
3	"Don't Forget About Me"	Jennifer Getzinger	Elizabeth Tippet	November 24, 2012	1.12
4	"Time of My Life"	Adam Davidson	Matt Pyken	December 1, 2012	1.41
5	"Get Down on It"	Kevin Dowling	Bridget Bedard	December 8, 2012	1.06
6	"We Are Family"	Paul Holahan	Alan R. Cohen & Alan Freedland	December 15, 2012	1.03
7	"I Don't Wanna Grow Up"	Phil Traill	Alan R. Cohen & Alan Freedland	December 22, 2012	1.29
8	"99 Problems"	Andrew Fleming	Josh Lobis & Darin Moiselle	January 5, 2013	0.94
9	"Personal Universe"	Peter Lauer	Harley Peyton	January 12, 2013	1.02
10	"End of the World As We Know It"	Timothy Busfield	Josh Lobis & Darin Moiselle	January 19, 2013	1.12

== Critical reception ==
Wedding Band received mixed reviews on Metacritic with a score of 61 out of 100 based on 12 critics' reviews. Robert Lloyd of the Los Angeles Times said: "'Wedding Band' plays too long but has a good beat". In the Daily News, David Hinckley Smith stated the "jokes flow nicely, the music is fun, and the pop culture references will make almost everyone smile." In The New York Times, Neil Genzlinger stated that "Here are two things you don’t see very often: an hourlong television comedy and a scripted sitcom on Saturday night that is worth watching!"

== International broadcasts ==
Country	Network(s)	Series premiere	Timeslot
Australia	Network Ten	December 5, 2012	Wednesday - 7:30pm
United Kingdom	5*	22 March 2013	Friday 22.00
Canada	MuchMore	November 10, 2012	Saturday - 10pm EST
Ireland	TV3	January 4, 2013	Fridays - 11:10pm
Portugal	TVSéries	December 18, 2012	Tuesdays - 9:15pm
Turkey	CNBC-e	2013	
Slovenia	Planet TV	February 9, 2013	Saturdays - 8:50pm CET
India	Comedy Central India	February 24, 2013	Sunday - 10:00pm IST
Lithuania	TV3	July 1, 2013	Monday - 10:00pm IST
Israel	Hot (Israel)	2013	
Iran	Manoto	2019	
Romania	Prima Comedy	April 7, 2023	Friday - Sunday - 08:00pm
