= Tollin/Robbins Productions =

American production company

Tollin Productions
- Formerly: Tollin/Robbins Productions (also known as TRP and T/RP) (1992–2012); Marquee/Tollin/Robbins (1998–2003)
- Type: Private
- Industry: Film; Television production
- Founded: 1992; 34 years ago
- Founders: Mike Tollin; Brian Robbins
- Headquarters: Toluca Lake, Los Angeles, California, U.S.
- Key people: Mike Tollin (1992–2013); Brian Robbins (1992–2013)

Tollin Productions (commonly known as TP and formerly known as Tollin/Robbins Productions and then Marquee/Tollin/Robbins) is an American film and television production company founded by Mike Tollin and Brian Robbins in 1992. Joe Davola was also an unofficial partner in the company and co-produced many of the company's productions along with Robbins and Tollin, and served as president of television in the 2000s.

== History ==
Tollin/Robbins Productions was formed by Brian Robbins and Mike Tollin in 1992; its early shows and early films were sports documentaries.

In 1994, the company formed an alliance with Nickelodeon to produce television shows, beginning with All That, which was later renewed in 1997. While working on that series, the company also produced the HBO show Arli$$. In 1996, the company signed a two-year production deal with Viacom to produce shows and movies for all of its networks.

In 1998, a controlling interest was sold to the Marquee Group, and the company briefly became Marquee Tollin/Robbins. In 1999, the company signed its television deal with Warner Bros. Television. At Warner Bros. Television, he signed up its first overall deal, that of creator Ryan Murphy, who was of Popular at that time.

In 2002, Tollin/Robbins Productions (TRP) agreed to a two-year first look movie deal with Paramount Pictures while having a television joint venture agreement with Warner Bros. Television. With the Paramount agreement, T/RP hired Caitlin Scanlon to head the film division which produced or directed 2-3 films a year.

While two of their pilots were in consideration for pick up on ABC in April 2003, Tollin/Robbins agreed to a two-year development deal, including a two-year option, profit sharing and outside sales, with Touchstone Television. In May, T/RP's agreement with Warner Bros. expired.

Under the Touchstone Television deal, two series were developed, the NBC drama Inconceivable and the ABC comedy Savages, that reached the small screen in the 2005–2006 season but were quickly canceled. NBC Universal Television Studio ended their television production agreement in June 2006 with T/RP with no series produced under the deal.

In March 2007 with the expiration of T/RP's production deal with Disney, Tollin and Robbins decided to scale back operations of T/RP with the both of them taking on project independent of T/RP. Robbins signed a two-year first look production deal with DreamWorks through the new company Varsity Pictures, while Tollin had two movies in the works with one at Lionsgate and the other with Greenestreet Pictures and Mandeville Films. T/RP would handle existing production and various projects already under development.

In March 2010, Tollin/Robbins sued Warner Bros. over claims of misdealing in the amount of $100 million over the profits of the Smallville series in selling the show to affiliates The WB and The CW and by later including DC Comics as a profit participate. In January 2013, Tollin Productions settled out of court with Warner Bros.

== Filmography ==
=== Films ===
- Hardwood Dreams (1993)
- Hank Aaron: Chasing the Dream (1995) (co-production with Turner Entertainment and Mundy Lane Entertainment)
- The Show (1995) (co-production with Savoy Pictures and Rysher Entertainment)
- Good Burger (1997) (co-production with Paramount Pictures and Nickelodeon Movies)
- Varsity Blues (1999) (co-production with Paramount Pictures and MTV Productions)
- Ready to Rumble (2000) (co-production with Warner Bros. Pictures, Bel Air Entertainment and Outlaw Productions)
- Summer Catch (2001) (co-production with Warner Bros. Pictures)
- Hardball (2001) (co-production with Paramount Pictures, Fireworks Pictures and Nides/McCormick Productions)
- Big Fat Liar (2002) (co-production with Universal Pictures)
- Radio (2003) (co-production with Columbia Pictures and Revolution Studios; distributed by Sony Pictures Releasing)
- The Perfect Score (2004) (co-production with Paramount Pictures and MTV Films)
- Coach Carter (2005) (co-production with Paramount Pictures and MTV Films)
- Dreamer (2005) (co-production with DreamWorks Pictures and Hyde Park Entertainment)
- The Shaggy Dog (2006) (co-production with Walt Disney Pictures, Mandeville Films, Boxing Cat Films and Robert Simonds Productions; distributed by Buena Vista Pictures Distribution)
- Norbit (2007) (co-production with DreamWorks Pictures and Davis Entertainment; distributed by Paramount Pictures)
- Wild Hogs (2007) (co-production with Touchstone Pictures; distributed by Buena Vista Pictures Distribution)
- Meet Dave (2008) (co-production with 20th Century Fox, Regency Enterprises, Dune Entertainment, Guy Walks Into a Bar Productions and Friendly Films)

=== TV shows ===
Duration	Title	Network
1994–2005	All That	Nickelodeon
1996–2000	Kenan & Kel	Nickelodeon
1996–2002	Arli$$	HBO
1998–2001	Cousin Skeeter	Nickelodeon
1999–2002	The Amanda Show	Nickelodeon
2000–2001	Hype	The WB
2001–2011	Smallville	The WB / The CW
2001–2002	The Nightmare Room	Kids' WB
2002–2003	The Nick Cannon Show	Nickelodeon
2002–2003	Slamball	TNN / Spike TV
2002–2006	What I Like About You	The WB
2002–2003	Birds of Prey	The WB
2003–2004	I'm with Her	ABC
2003–2012	One Tree Hill	The WB / The CW
2004	The Days	ABC
2005	Global Frequency	The WB
2005	Inconceivable	NBC
2006	Crumbs	ABC
2006	Bonds on Bonds	ESPN
2007	The Bronx Is Burning	ESPN
2012–2013	Wedding Band	TBS
2021	Klutch Academy	BET
