= The People's Fighters: Teofilo Stevenson and the Legend of Cuban Boxing =

2018 American documentary film

- Genre: Documentary film
- Written by: Diego Hurtado de Mendoza; Jon Weinbach
- Directed by: Peter Berg; Diego Hurtado de Mendoza
- Narrated by: Peter Berg
- Music by: Arturo Cardelús
- Country of origin: United States
- Original languages: English; Spanish

Production
- Executive producers: Federico di Mojana; Yiannis Exarchos; Greg Groggel; Frank Marshall; Mark Parkman; Michael Tollin; Jon Weinbach
- Producer: Diego Hurtado de Mendoza
- Cinematography: Jon Aguirresarobe; Diego Hurtado de Mendoza
- Editor: Javier Dampierre
- Running time: 87 minutes
- Production companies: Mandalay Sports Media (MSM); The Kennedy/Marshall Company

Original release
- Network: Olympic Channel
- Release: May 31, 2018

The People's Fighters: Teofilo Stevenson and the Legend of Cuban Boxing is a 2018 documentary film directed by Peter Berg and Diego Hurtado de Mendoza that aired on the Olympic Channel in the United States. Narrated by Peter Berg, the documentary includes archival footage as well as interviews with other Cuban Olympic medal winners.

== Plot ==
With a population of just 11 million people, Cuba has produced the most Olympic boxing medalists of any country in the world, winning 73 Olympic medals including 38 gold medals in the past 50 years. The documentary examines Teófilo Stevenson's career as well as the phenomenon of boxing in Cuba overall.

== Cast ==
- Emilio Correa Sr.
- Jorge Hernández
- Armando Martínez
- José Gómez Mustelier
- Rolando Garbey
- Félix Savón
- Alcides Sagarra Carón
- Oscar De La Hoya
- Peter Berg (narrator)

== Production ==
The film was produced as the second film in the Five Rings Films series. Filming took place in the United States and Cuba.

== Broadcast ==
The film was broadcast on the Olympic Channel in the United States on May 31, 2018.

== Reception ==
ESPN staff writer Nigel Collins wrote, "Those who have not seen the freakish power in Stevenson's right hand are in for a treat. The documentary celebrates his dominance with footage of Teofilo dispatching U.S. hopefuls Duane Bobick, Tyrell Briggs and John Tate with alarming ease." He continued, "One of major strengths of 'The People's Fighter' is allowing the story to be told from the Cuban point of view. Berg's narration is smooth and informative but never presumptuous. The opinions are those of the people on the ground, the ones that count, the real stars of the film."

The International Sport Movies TV Federation called it "an in-depth look at Cuba’s overwhelming history of success in the sport of boxing."
