= Quiet on Set: The Dark Side of Kids TV =

2024 American documentary television series

- Promotional artwork for the documentary
- Genre: Documentary; True crime
- Directed by: Mary Robertson; Emma Schwartz
- Country of origin: United States
- Original language: English
- No. of episodes: 5

Production
- Executive producers: Mary Robertson; Aaron Saidman; Eli Holzman; Nicholas Carlson; Joel Stonington; Kate Taylor; Pamela Deutsch
- Production locations: California, U.S.
- Cinematography: Victor Tadashi Suarez
- Editors: Jane Jo; Daphne Gomez-Mena; Fanny Lee; Tal Ben-David
- Running time: 43 minutes
- Production companies: Maxine Productions; Sony Pictures Television Nonfiction; Business Insider

Original release
- Network: Investigation Discovery
- Release: March 17 – April 7, 2024

Quiet on Set: The Dark Side of Kids TV is a 2024 American five-part documentary television series that details the toxic behind-the-scenes world of children's television programs from the 1990s to the 2000s, with a special focus on Dan Schneider's tenure as a producer and showrunner at Nickelodeon. The first four episodes aired March 17–18, 2024, on Investigation Discovery, and the fifth episode aired on April 7. The series was simultaneously released on HBO Max and Discovery+, and produced by Maxine Productions with Sony Pictures Television Nonfiction and Business Insider; it was loosely based on a Business Insider article about Nickelodeon from 2022.

After the series was released, the show was positively reviewed by audiences and critics, with praise given to individuals who alleged having negative experiences working at Nickelodeon. However, some critics accused the documentary of not going into enough detail about Nickelodeon's workplace culture. Schneider has since released an apology video on his YouTube channel, fueling further discussions from other Nickelodeon stars and further comments from the individuals featured in the documentary. In addition, several of the individuals who wrote pleas for leniency for sex offender Brian Peck following his conviction have publicly renounced supporting him, especially in light of the documentary. The series has also led to a widespread debate, particularly on social media, around industry practices with regards to child actors, the loss of innocence, and the cost of fame for child stars.

The series received two nominations at the 76th Primetime Creative Arts Emmy Awards, including for Outstanding Documentary or Nonfiction Series.

== Synopsis ==
Quiet on Set: the Dark Side of Kids TV focuses primarily on the rise of television producer Dan Schneider, who was later accused of fostering a hostile work environment. The series depicts Schneider's work in chronological order, starting with his first big hit as a writer on All That in 1994. Interviewed writers Christy Stratton and Jenny Kilgen accuse Schneider of underpaying them for their work on The Amanda Show and presiding over a rampant culture of misogyny in the writers' room. As the show progresses, issues regarding the actors in Schneider's productions are covered. Former actress Alexa Nikolas appears detailing her experience working in the series Zoey 101. Former cast and crew members of All That, The Amanda Show and other Nickelodeon shows appear as well.

In the third episode, Drake Bell reveals that he was sexually abused by former Nickelodeon dialogue coach Brian Peck (no relation to Bell's Drake & Josh co-star Josh Peck) in 2001. Peck was arrested and charged in 2003 for child sexual abuse, but the victim's name had been sealed. Letters to the presiding judge in support of Peck were also revealed, including from actors James Marsden, Kimmy Robertson, Taran Killam, Alan Thicke, Joanna Kerns, Rider Strong, and Will Friedle along with director Rich Correll and producer Tom DeSanto. Kerns issued a statement to the documentary maker in this episode that she was unaware of the full extent of the case at the time and now regrets her letter of support.

Another sexual abuser, production assistant Jason Michael Handy, described himself as a "pedophile, full-blown" while also sending a sexually explicit photograph to a former child actress. Handy would be sentenced to six years in prison for other charges in 2004.

== Production ==
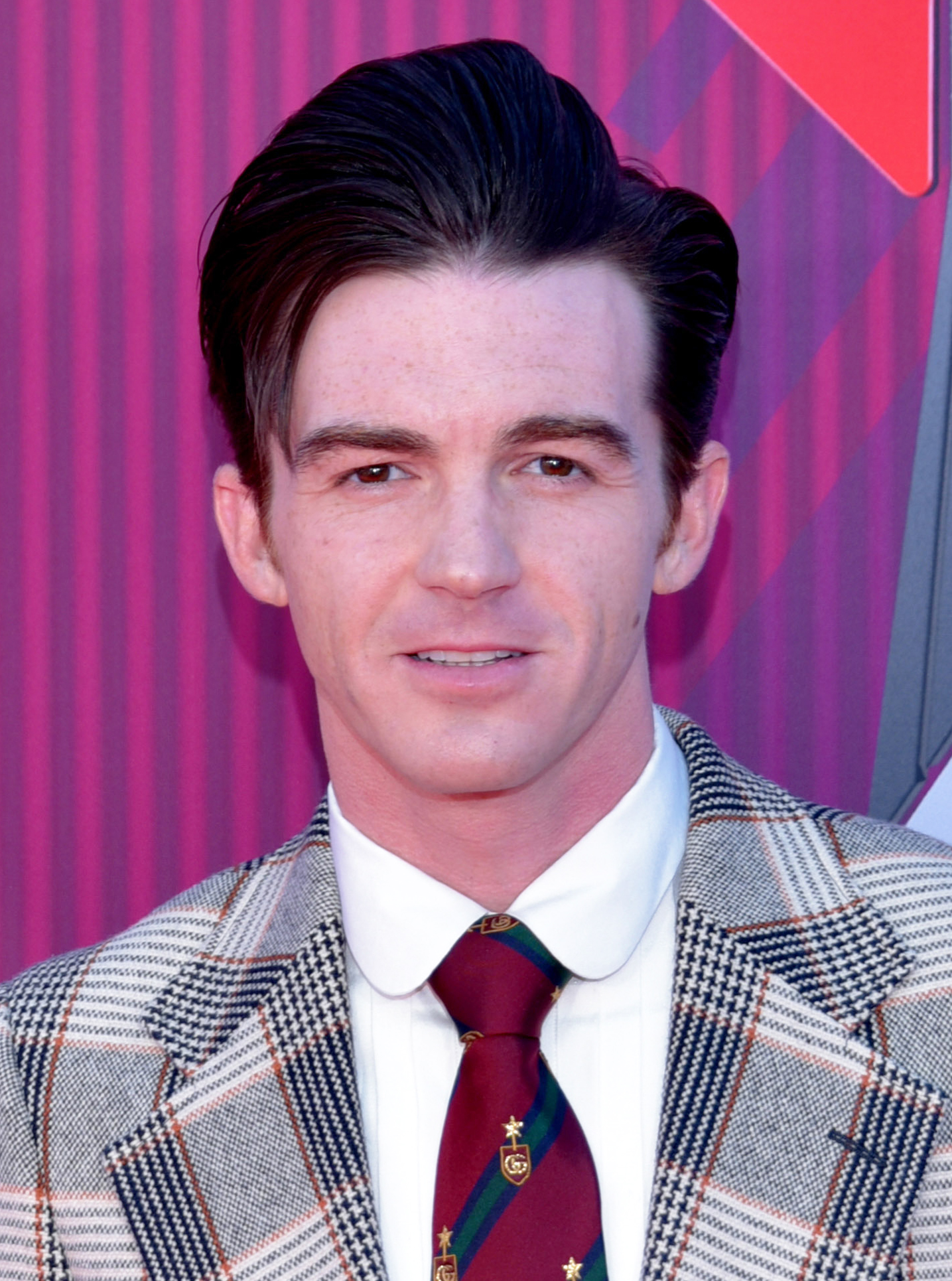
Drake Bell, who starred in The Amanda Show and Drake & Josh, is featured prominently in the series' third and fourth episodes.

In 2018, in response to the #MeToo movement, Viacom International's MTV Networks interviewed dozens of employees regarding their experiences with Dan Schneider. Although their review found no sexual misconduct by Schneider, the employees expressed that Schneider was controlling and verbally abusive towards them. In March of that year, Schneider and Nickelodeon announced that their partnership was dissolving and Schneider would be let go.

During that time, director and producer Mary Robertson noticed a string of viral videos showcasing inappropriate scenes from Schneider-produced shows. One video she noted was one of Ariana Grande as Cat Valentine from Victorious pouring water on her face while lying upside down. Another clip depicted Jamie Lynn Spears as Zoey Brooks in an episode of Zoey 101 getting viscous liquid squirted onto her face. Robertson thought that the two clips evoked pornographic imagery.

Robertson (with Emma Schwartz) later partnered with Business Insider reporter Kate Taylor to reach out to dozens of actors and crew members who worked on the sets of Schneider's shows. Taylor previously wrote about Nickelodeon in a 2022 Business Insider article entitled "Inside Dan Schneider's 'disgusting' Nickelodeon empire". Taylor's article partially influenced the direction of the series. Schwartz noted that the many individuals who responded to the offer were relieved that they could share their negative experiences, but several more were still afraid to come forward with their experiences. They also attempted to reach out to Schneider, but he refused to appear on camera. His responses were shown throughout the series through text. After Bell's interview was filmed, he would tell Robertson that a weight was lifted from him. On The Sarah Fraser Show podcast on March 22, 2024, Bell revealed that he went to rehab after his interview for the documentary. Bell was previously offered to be in a similar documentary, but he refused. Bell revealed in 2024 that he received criticism for not appearing in the other documentary.

Before they sat down with Bell, the directors petitioned the court to make the letters supporting Brian Peck public. They told Variety "We didn't know what we would find...[b]ut what the letters allow us to do is get a window into who, in Hollywood, was supporting this man during a time that he had been convicted as a child sex offender." After the trailer for the documentary was released, Robertson told US Magazine that she attempted to reach out to Rider Strong and Will Friedle but neither responded. Kate Taylor and Olivia Singh later published several letters featured in the documentary on Business Insider.

Robertson told The Hollywood Reporter that if the series became successful, she hoped they could make more episodes of Quiet on Set. On March 22, 2024, Rotten Tomatoes listed a fifth episode called Breaking the Silence. On March 26, 2024, Investigation Discovery confirmed that the fifth episode would premiere on April 7 and that Bell would make another appearance. Jason Sarlanis, a Warner Bros. Discovery executive, stated that the episode would dig "deeper into the crucial conversations the docuseries ignited and exploring the lingering questions left in their wake to provide further insight from the brave voices who've spoken out previously and those who are coming forward again."

== Episodes ==
Episodes of Quiet on Set
| No. | Title | Original release date | U.S. viewers (millions) |
|---|---|---|---|
| 1 | "Rising Stars, Rising Questions" | March 17, 2024 | 0.614 |
The episode explores the early career of Dan Schneider, especially with his involvement as a producer and writer on All That and casting choice with Amanda Bynes, who became a successful young actress at the time. After the success of All That, workers and former cast members reveal that Schneider's toxic behavior suddenly emerged when they had a hard time working with him at the Nickelodeon studio. Two former female writers on The Amanda Show, Christy Stratton and Jenny Kilgen, discuss their tumultuous relationship with Schneider. These include a split payment that goes against union regulations and alleged sexual harassment from Schneider. After receiving Schneider's aggressive threats, Stratton was later fired from production, and Kilgen quit her job out of discomfort, vowing never to work with Schneider again. The episode ends after two writers settled a lawsuit on gender discrimination against Schneider.
| 2 | "Hidden in Plain Sight" | March 17, 2024 | 0.614 |
Amanda Bynes was discovered by a producer in 1996 during a routine at Laugh Factory. Her career was catapulted by The Amanda Show and What I Like About You. Bynes severed ties with Schneider, whom she looked up to, for his involvement in filing a lawsuit against her parents, which affected her reputation. The show's former writers removed Schneider because of the controversy, causing Schneider to continue working at Nickelodeon. Former child actors of All That express the hardship from Schneider's toxic work environment during their performance on the SNICK On-Air Dare including Leon Frierson, Bryan Hearne, Katrina Johnson, Giovonnie Samuels, and Kyle Sullivan. The episode also reveals that two crew members of All That, production assistant Jason Michael Handy and dialogue coach and actor Brian Peck, the latter of which also worked on The Amanda Show, became convicted sex offenders. Handy was arrested in 2003 with multiple felony charges of inappropriate child molestation and child pornography. Three months later, Peck was also arrested for assaulting a minor, which caused mass shock in production, questioning how the incident with Peck happened. The episode ends with Drake Bell, who was revealed to be one of the victims of sex offenders.
| 3 | "The Darkest Secret" | March 18, 2024 | 0.641 |
Drake Bell and his father Joe discuss their situation during the production of The Amanda Show. When he and Drake first met Brian Peck at Nickelodeon on Sunset, Joe became suspicious of Peck's behavior towards his son and the executives ignoring his complaints due to Peck being openly gay. Upon learning about the divorce from Drake's parents, Brian Peck manipulated Drake into believing he was more important in Drake's life than his parents, which caused Drake to sever his ties with his father. Drake struggles to talk about Peck, who eventually sexually assaulted him many times when Peck isolated him from production. After Drake ignored Peck, who repeatedly calls Drake at his girlfriend's house and insists he plays the role of the father on Drake & Josh, he and his mother organized a police sting that resulted in Peck being arrested. While Drake and his parents were relieved that they would not have to deal with him anymore, Drake remained traumatized for years to the point that he went down a self-destructive path. Drake reveals that the lawsuit surrounding Peck's long-term sentencing did not happen.
| 4 | "Too Close to the Sun" | March 18, 2024 | 0.641 |
The episode begins by discussing Brian Peck's court case in 2004, which involved multiple Hollywood individuals supporting him. Peck was sentenced to 16 months in prison and was required to register as a convicted sex offender as he continued working in Hollywood after his release, which also caused a media backlash at Disney Channel for hiring him. The letters from Hollywood individuals recovered from the court reveal multiple cases of misinformation and victim-blaming, which exemplify Peck's manipulation. When Ezel Channel, a former worker of Nickelodeon, was exposed as a sex offender, the public began to question Nickelodeon's policy on protecting child actors. After the success of Drake & Josh, Dan Schneider's later career sees him becoming more important to Nickelodeon, but he receives scrutiny for his sometimes inappropriate behavior, as well as sexual jokes featured on Zoey 101, iCarly, and Victorious. Jennette McCurdy, a former child actress-turned-teen idol who starred in iCarly and Sam & Cat, reveals several details of Schneider's verbal abuse from her published memoir, I'm Glad My Mom Died, and her recent absence from the Nickelodeon Kids' Choice Awards in 2014. Nickelodeon's decision to fire Schneider in 2018 during the #MeToo movement is applauded by crewmembers. However, some interviewers reflect on how being child actors affected their well-being when they reached adulthood. In contrast, other child actors who became celebrities fell into a downward spiral from their childhood mental trauma, resulting in facing legal charges and mental health problems. The episode acknowledges Drake Bell's legal issues – including his DUI arrest in 2015 and his 2021 guilty plea for attempted child endangerment.
| 5 | "Breaking the Silence" | April 7, 2024 | 0.453 |
The episode recaps the first four episodes, including unused clips. The episode also features interviews from Drake Bell, Giovonnie Samuels, Bryan Hearne, Hearne's mother Tracey Brown, and Shane Lyons. This is also Lyons' debut appearance in the docuseries. Journalist Soledad O'Brien served as the episode's moderator.

== Cast ==
In alphabetical order:

- Drake Bell (actor and musician)
- Joe Bell (Drake Bell's father)
- Tracey Brown (Bryan Hearne's mother)
- Mike Denton (cameraman)
- Rick Ellis (journalist)
- Virgil L. Fabian (TV director)
- Leon Frierson (actor)
- Bryan Hearne (actor)
- Anne Henry (co-founder, BizParentz Foundation)
- Katrina Johnson (actress)
- Jenny Kilgen (writer)
- Scaachi Koul (culture writer for BuzzFeed Canada)
- Raquel Lee (actress)
- Shane Lyons (actor)
- Alexa Nikolas (actress)
- Soledad O'Brien (journalist)
- Pam Penn (Raquel Lee's mother)
- Kimmy Robertson (actress)
- Giovonnie Samuels (actress)
- Christy Stratton (writer)
- Kyle Sullivan (actor)
- Marc Summers (TV host and producer)
- Kate Taylor (journalist for Business Insider)
- Karyn Finley Thompson (TV editor)

== Reception ==
Professional ratings
Aggregate scores
| Source | Rating |
|---|---|
| Metacritic | 77/100 |
| Rotten Tomatoes | 100% |
Review scores
| Source | Rating |
| Chicago Sun-Times | 3/4 stars |
| The Guardian | 4/5 stars |

On review aggregator Rotten Tomatoes, 100% of 12 critics gave the series a positive review with an average rating of 7.6/10. The website's critic consensus states, "Respectful and thorough in giving voice to the collateral damage of an entertainment empire that was only kid-friendly on the surface, Quiet on Set is a vital showbiz exposé." On Metacritic, the series holds a weighted average score of 77 out of 100 based on four critics, indicating a "generally favorable" show.

Richard Roeper from the Chicago Sun-Times positively reviewed the series, giving it three out of four stars. He wrote that the documentary expanded on a report by Business Insider and described the documentary as a "journalistically solid, straightforward and at times heartbreaking expose." Eric Deggans from NPR praised the individuals on the show for speaking out while also hoping that documentaries like Quiet on Set could "change popular attitudes about how child actors are treated in the same way that other works have changed ideas about sexual assault, harassment and codes of conduct in the workplaces which fuel Hollywood's dream factory".

Nick Schager, entertainment critic for The Daily Beast, positively reviewed the series, writing that it "resonates as a continuation of a tale as old as Hollywood itself, and yet another warning to moms and dads that they should think twice before agreeing to help their juvenile offspring chase A-list glory". Jack Seale of The Guardian rated the series four out of five stars, writing "Anything that makes [child sexual abuse] less likely to happen again is invaluable. Quiet on Set has, commendably, played its part."

Candice Frederick of Huffington Post gave the show a mostly-positive review. She liked that the series presented stories other than Drake Bell's testimony. However, she criticized the series for not going in-depth with Nickelodeon's overall workplace culture, writing "If that's true, how many of them still work at, or with, Nickelodeon? This is the kind of thing we should also be asking." Vulture's Ben Rosenstock had similar issues with the docuseries, criticizing it for certain omissions; such as allegations where Schneider tried to get teenage actors to drink alcohol, the sexual assault accusations against Bell, and a paucity of former employees of Nickelodeon willing to talk openly about the workplace culture beyond Schneider's heavy involvement.

Kelly Lawler of USA Today wrote that she "can't help but empathize" with the notion that children's television should be more regulated in order to keep future child actors safe. She also pointed out that many individuals featured in Quiet on Set would never let their own children be a part of the acting industry. Lawler concluded "Even as Quiet has encouraged a conversation about child actors, who at least have some legal protection, there is a wild west of child influencers on TikTok and Instagram".

According to Nielsen Media Research, the first two episodes were viewed by 0.614 million viewers with a 0.40 household rating and a 0.11 18–49 rating. The next two episodes were viewed by 0.641 million viewers with a 0.42 household rating and a 0.13 18–49 rating. Reelgood reported that the docuseries was the fifth most streamed television series across all streaming platforms from March 14 to March 20, 2024. From March 18 to March 25, 2024, Quiet on Set was the most streamed television series in the United States according to the streaming aggregator JustWatch. On March 26, 2024, Investigation Discovery reported that the first four episodes were watched by over 16 million viewers across cable, Max, and Discovery+. It was also the most-viewed unscripted series on Max since its launch on May 23, 2023.

=== Nickelodeon's response ===
Just before the series premiered, a Nickelodeon spokesperson issued statements to Variety and NBC News that stated, "Now that Drake Bell has disclosed his identity as the plaintiff in the 2004 case, we are dismayed and saddened to learn of the trauma he has endured, and we commend and support the strength required to come forward". Nickelodeon also told Variety that they investigate "all formal complaints as part of our commitment to fostering a safe and professional workplace environment free of harassment or other kinds of inappropriate conduct."

In an interview on The Sarah Fraser Show, Drake Bell found Nickelodeon's response to be "empty" and felt that it was written "by obviously a legal representative."

=== Response from other Nickelodeon stars ===
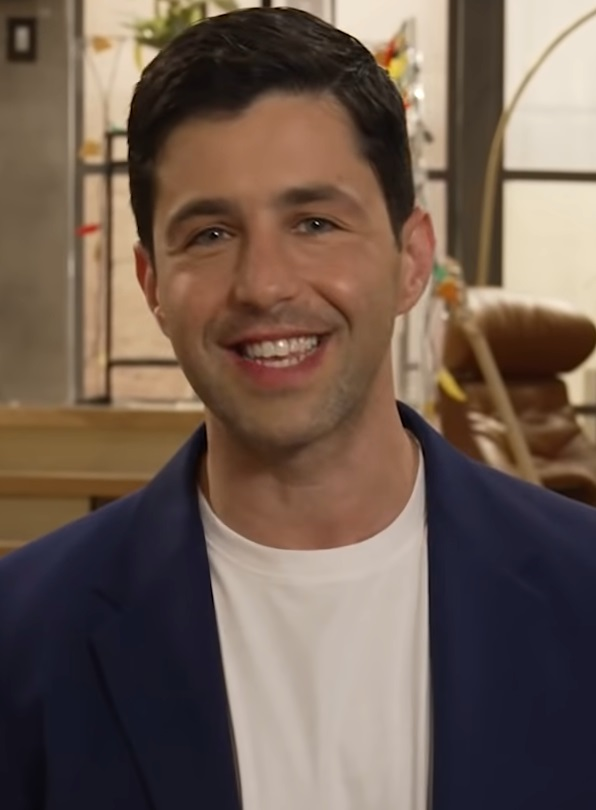
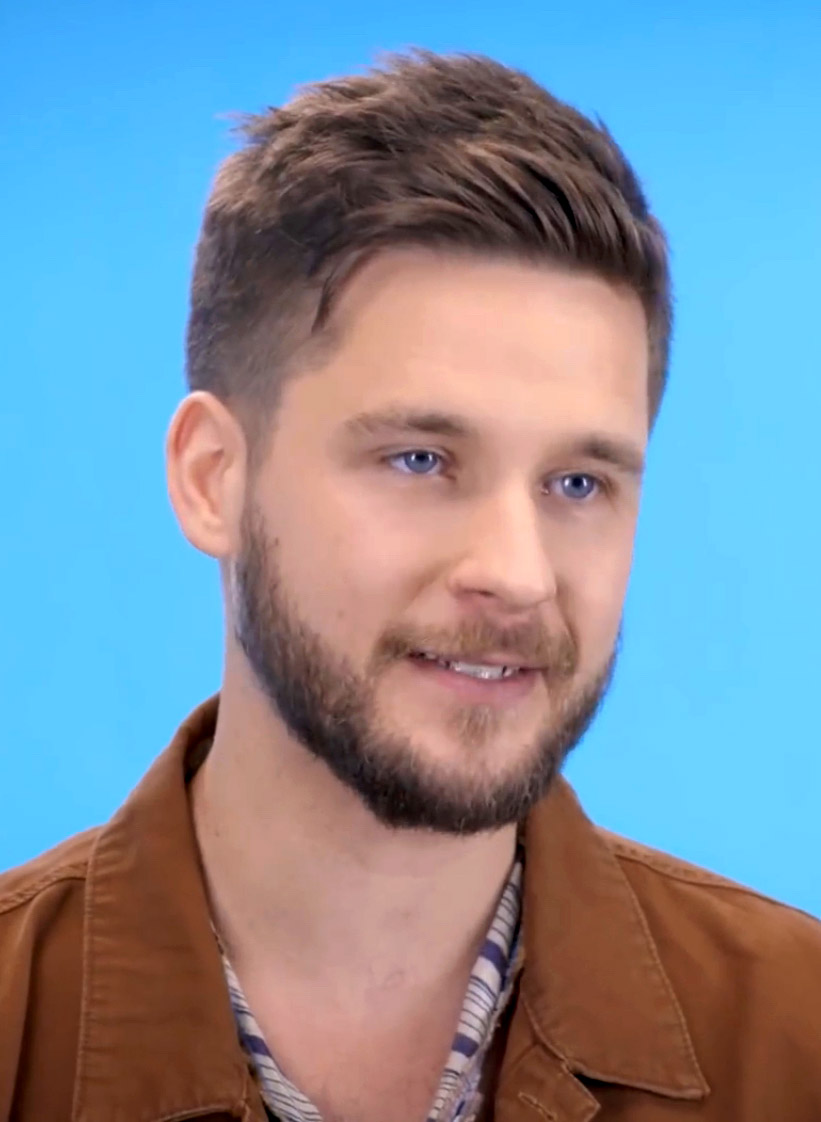
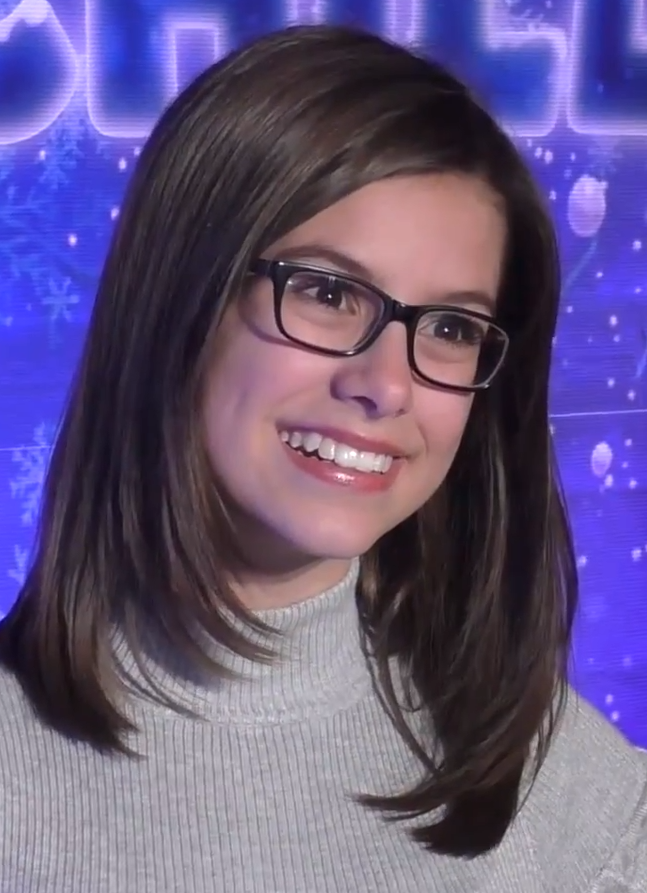
From left to right: Josh Peck, Devon Werkheiser, and Madisyn Shipman are among the Nickelodeon stars who have responded to the documentary series.

On a TikTok live video, Ned's Declassified School Survival Guide star Devon Werkheiser joked about the Nickelodeon abuse allegations with co-stars Lindsey Shaw and Daniel Curtis Lee present. He then attempted to walk back the comments, saying "sorry, we shouldn't joke about this." Drake Bell and Alexa Nikolas, among others, criticized the live video on Twitter and several accused the trio of making light of child sexual abuse. In response, Werkheiser issued an apology to Bell and the other featured individuals, writing "I was being an idiot today" and stated that he was sorry for worsening the pain of the featured actors. On March 22, 2024, all three actors would elaborate the incident in their podcast, Ned's Declassified Podcast Survival Guide. During the episode, Werkheiser recalled a positive interaction with Bell during the Ned's Declassified pilot's wrap party. The actors also revealed that Brian Peck was on-set as a stand-in during a single episode of Ned's Declassified.

Marc Summers, former host of Double Dare, was surprised by his involvement in the docuseries and withdrew from the project upon learning what it was about. He revealed on Elvis Duran and the Morning Show that he was misled into thinking that the documentary was about Nickelodeon in general. Upon being shown footage of a Nickelodeon series, he walked off the set, feeling "ambushed". He denied meeting Dan Schneider or any of the subjects involved, adding that his time on Nickelodeon preceded them. He was informed that his appearance would be cut, although he was later informed a part would be shown. Robertson and Schwartz responded by stating that all participants were informed of the project's intentions. However, further evidence from other participants being unaware fully of the series was brought up when Raquel Lee and Alexa Nikolas expressed disappointment on the docuseries being revealed to be made for Investigation Discovery, with both claiming they would not have done the interview upon knowing that, feeling that their story should have been on a "more serious credible platform".

Just after the episode was released, Bell's co-star Josh Peck received negative comments on his social media for remaining silent about the abuse Bell endured. Josh Peck previously mentioned on a 2022 podcast that he was not really close with Bell. On March 20, 2024, Bell defended Peck through a TikTok video, stating that Peck privately reached out to him. A day later, Josh Peck broke his silence through a post on Instagram. Peck stated that after finishing the docuseries, he took a few days to process it, and afterwards he reached out to Bell, confirming Bell's video the day earlier. Peck concluded "Children should be protected" and hoped that Quiet on Set could bring a "necessary change" to the film industry.

Nancy Sullivan, who was an ensemble member of The Amanda Show and portrayed Audrey Parker on Drake & Josh, also expressed support for Bell. In an Instagram post, she wrote "Sending love to Drake for a deep healing and for a rich and beautiful life ahead." Steve Burns, who portrayed Steve on the Nick Jr. series Blue's Clues, posted a video on TikTok where he spoke to his viewers while breaking the fourth wall, "Hey, just checking in. Tell me, what's goin' on", before remaining silent, in the spirit of the interactions on his original show. Although the docuseries was never mentioned in the video, Burns' video was seen by individuals on Twitter as a response to the docuseries. In an interview with NBC's Today, Burns stated that Nickelodeon and Nick Jr. were separate and that Nick Jr. operates primarily in New York City while Nickelodeon operates primarily in Los Angeles, and there was "no overlap whatsoever between any of those shows and what we were doing". He later stated "I'm coming to it much the same as anyone else, with horror and heartbreak. It's just terrible to watch it unfold. I don't know what else to say, other than that it's heartbreaking."

Kenan Thompson responded that the situation was a "tough subject", adding that most of the incidents described occurred after he left Nickelodeon. He also mentioned that Schneider was not involved much on Kenan & Kel and that his "heart goes out to anyone that's been victimized, or their families." He also urged Nickelodeon to investigate it, complaining that the network was "supposed to be a safe place for kids". Kel Mitchell responded by mentioning an incident back in 1997 where he got into an argument with Schneider, who was the head writer of All That, in which he yelled at Mitchell.

Amber Frank, who portrayed Taylor Hathaway in The Haunted Hathaways, posted a response video on her TikTok, alleging that child pornography appeared on some of Nickelodeon's computers when they began work on the show. Allie DiMeco, who portrayed Rosalina in The Naked Brothers Band, alleged that the episode where she kissed a Frenchman in his thirties gave her PTSD. She claimed that she was around 14 or 15 at the time. She called out Nickelodeon for not allowing kids to speak out against these decisions. However, she acknowledged that the set of Naked Brothers Band was relatively safer than others due to the show's involvement from showrunner Polly Draper, the mother of stars Nat Wolff and Alex Wolff. Variety reported that actor playing the Frenchman, Jake Hertzog, would have been about 21 years old at the time of filming. DiMeco also alleged that when she was "12 or 13", an adult female producer kissed her after DiMeco mentioned that she never had her first kiss. Jack Salvatore Jr., who portrayed Mark Del Figgalo on Zoey 101 and was a writer on several of Schneider's shows, responded to the documentary through an Instagram video by adding several more allegations to Schneider. These included Schneider bringing out a shotgun to scare one of the writers as well as Nickelodeon not recommending anti-depressant pills to iCarly star Jennette McCurdy after the death of her mother due to the risk of suicide. He later stated he wanted to do his part in "preventing something like this from ever happening again".

Matt Bennett, who played Robbie Shapiro on Victorious, wrote on his Instagram account disapproving of the treatment of the actors on set, with an additional note stating that it is a private situation for a lot of people and wishing for people to be respectful of their privacy. Melissa Joan Hart, who played the titular character in Clarissa Explains It All, reacted to the documentary in the podcast Meghan McCain Has Entered the Chat. Although she had a positive experience during her time on Nickelodeon, Hart told Meghan McCain that she still trusts the victims "one hundred percent".

Angel Massey, the mother of Zoey 101 star Christopher Massey, defended Schneider on Instagram. She praised Schneider for boosting her son's career while also blaming the victim's parents. She also posted some images of people's negative comments, including an image of multicolored fly swatters. Christopher Massey later posted an Instagram story urging people to leave his mother alone. He also wrote "My story will be told from me.....not from a parent, a friend, a co worker.....ME!!!" Madisyn Shipman, who starred in the Nickelodeon show Game Shakers, also defended Schneider. On an Instagram post, she shared that she had "nothing but positive things to say" about Schneider based on her experience on set. Zoey 101 star Matthew Underwood revealed on his Instagram that he was sexually abused as a child and was sexually assaulted by his agent when he was 19, causing him to retire from acting. He mentioned his experience at Nickelodeon working for Schneider was mostly positive, praising him for taking accountability in his apology. He also urged fans to stop sending death threats to former child stars for not speaking up.

In episode 5 of the series, former All That stars Giovonnie Samuels and Bryan Hearne responded to Schneider's apology, expressing dissatisfaction.

In a Business Insider interview, All That star Lori Beth Denberg accused Schneider of showing her pornography, including bestiality, initiating phone sex with her and groping her breasts. Schneider denied much of her allegations, calling them "wildly exaggerated", noting that the interviewer was executive producer Kate Taylor.

In a 2024 interview with Marie Claire, Victoria Justice described her relationship with Schneider as "complex" as he helped her rise to fame and was grateful. She acknowledged Schneider's ego and after hearing Schneider say he owes people an apology, Justice said "one of them would be me". She also said some of the jokes, especially the ones that were inappropriate were in poor taste.

On Penn Badgley's podcast Podcrushed, Ariana Grande mentioned that she had to "reprocess" her relationship to Nickelodeon. She added that at the time of filming Victorious, she and the cast felt that the humor "pushed the envelope" and that it happened quickly. She added after realizing the context, she became a little bit upset and deemed much of the child actors featured as survivors. Grande supported the notion of having therapists on television sets.

=== Dan Schneider's response ===
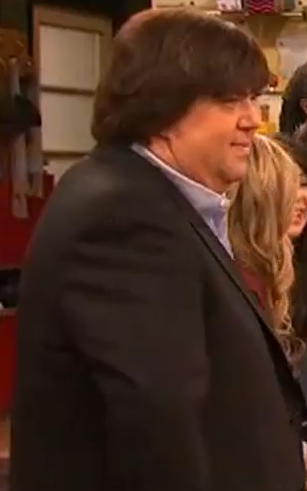
Dan Schneider, a central subject of the documentary series, in 2011

Before the episodes were broadcast, Schneider's spokesperson released a statement that defended the content of his productions. The spokesperson claimed that everything was approved by the network producers. The spokesperson concluded, "Unfortunately, some adults project their adult minds onto kids' shows, drawing false conclusions about them."

After the episodes were broadcast, Schneider uploaded an interview on YouTube with BooG!E (who had appeared as recurring character T-Bo on iCarly) regarding the docuseries. Schneider stated that the documentary was hard to watch, specifically citing a moment when he asked several crew members for massages. Schneider also agreed that some jokes on his older shows should be cut for future airings, adding they were added as kids found them funny and nobody brought concern at the time. He reiterated that every creative decision he made at Nickelodeon was carefully reviewed by the network.

Schneider acknowledged his behavior in writing rooms and apologized for making writers feel uncomfortable with the environment. He also denied having any role in salaries, stating that sharing salaries is a common practice among television writers. Schneider cited the demand of producing over 40 episodes a year for feeling pressure. Schneider mentioned he was very proud of the diversity of his shows, with several having major Black characters. He denied being banned from any set and stated if he was ever off set he was busy writing; since he was known to be present on set, this gave such an illusion. Schneider stated that he was part of Amanda Bynes' counsel for her attempted emancipation and that she called him one morning distressed. Schneider, concerned for her, stated he called someone trusted to pick her up and that she was eventually taken by police.

Regarding the sexual abuse of Drake Bell by Brian Peck, Schneider denied hiring Peck and stated that the case was "the darkest part of my career" and was devastated by Bell's abuse, adding that he helped Bell's mother prepare her courtroom speech. He also acknowledged feeling baffled after hearing Peck, a registered sex offender, was hired by Disney Channel after being released from prison. When asked if there was anything that could be changed in hindsight, Schneider mentioned having an on-set therapist as well as changing his demeanor.

Alexa Nikolas, one of the individuals featured in the documentary, released a YouTube live stream reacting to Schneider's video on March 20, 2024. In her video, she criticized Schneider's decision to release a public video rather than sending private apologies to each of the former child stars and staff members. Furthermore, she also voiced her disapproval at Schneider's decision to enlist an actor in one of his shows to conduct the interview, likening it to an echo chamber. Nikolas concluded by saying "I don't forgive Dan Schneider" and accused him of "playing the victim." Nikolas founded a protest organization, "Eat Predators", which has sold merchandise critical of Nickelodeon. Some people have criticized Nikolas on social media for this, accusing her, according to BuzzFeed of "'profiting' from her Nickelodeon costars' 'trauma'". Nikolas has responded to this by writing, "Nickelodeon was my childhood trauma TOO. BTW. I got exploited as a child while in a toxic work environment and that company made millions of dollars off of [sic] us kids. I want to see people supporting me and others rocking a Sickelodeon t-shirt. You watch that doc and attack me?".

All That cast member Bryan Hearne, who was featured in the documentary, found Schneider's performative, stating "If I could be candid, Dan was an actor before all of this,"..."And so I think that he brushed off some chops and gave us a nice performance. Where was all this apologizing when Jennette McCurdy's book came out?" Leon Frierson, another individual featured in the documentary, had a more positive reaction to Schneider's video. In a statement to Entertainment Weekly, he said Schenider acknowledged his mistakes while he "shed light on a failed process" to reduce any questionable content on the network. On the That's F***ed Up Podcast, Frierson also revealed that he was paid about 1/10 as much as cast members from other networks.

In May 2024, Schneider sued the producers of the documentary for defamation, claiming that the series implied he was complicit in child sexual abuse. The producers of Quiet on Set attempted to dismiss the suit by filing a motion, claiming Schneider's suit was a SLAPP suit. In November 2024, Los Angeles Superior Court Judge Ashfaq Chowdhury ruled that Schneider's suit had merit and had not been brought "on frivolous grounds, simply to harass defendants", allowing it to proceed.

In September 2026, Schneider's lawsuit was thrown out due to an appeal by Warner Bros. Discovery, Sony Pictures Television, and producers Mary Robertson and Emma Schwartz, citing California's anti-SLAPP law, finding that the documentary did not imply Schneider was a sexual predator.

=== Response from Brian Peck's former supporters ===
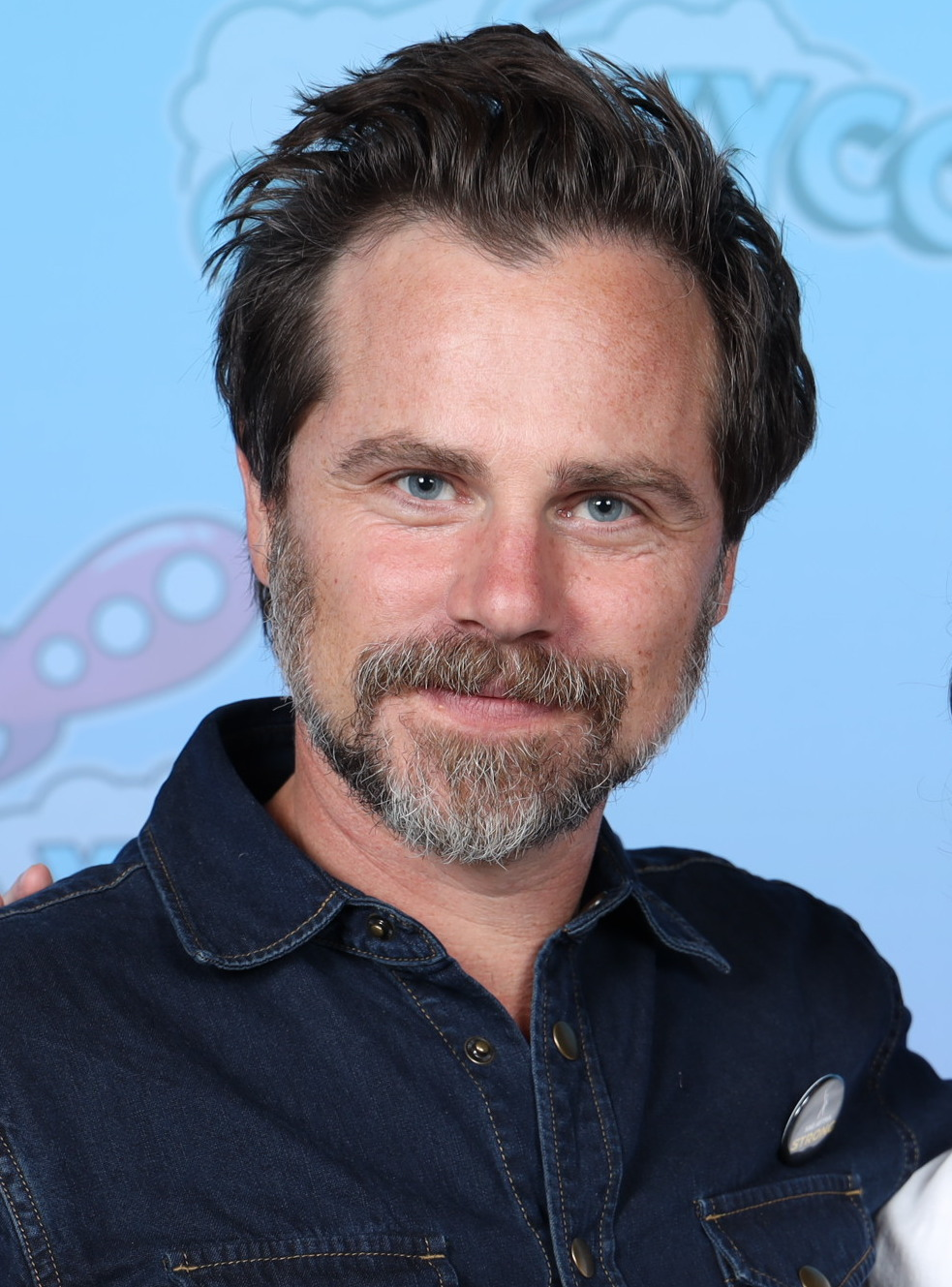
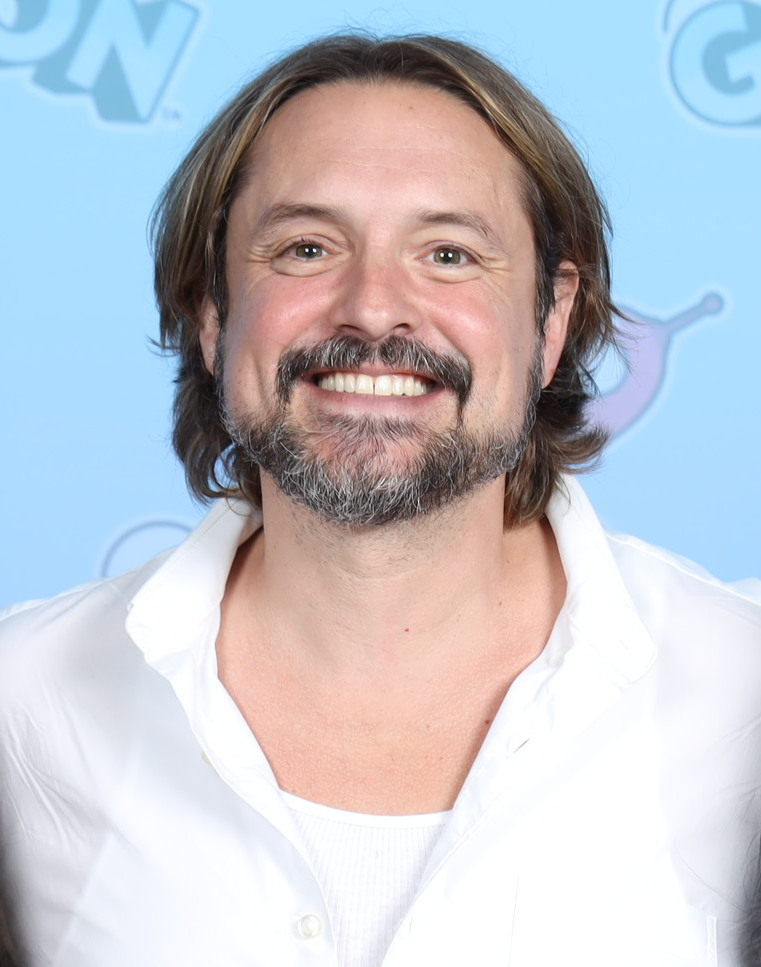
From left to right: Rider Strong and Will Friedle addressed their past friendship with Brian Peck on Pod Meets World.

Just before the docuseries aired, Strong and Friedle released an episode of the podcast series Pod Meets World in which they addressed their past friendship with Brian Peck on the set of Boy Meets World and defense of him during the trial and sentencing. Both contended they were not aware of the full extent of Peck's charges and that he had misled them. They also said they had since cut ties with Peck. In an interview on the podcast The Sarah Fraser Show in March 2024, Drake Bell took issue with the Pod Meets World episode, pointing out that both Friedle and Strong were already adults when they wrote their letters (Friedle was 27 and Strong was 24). He also revealed in the same interview that he never received any apologies from any of the people who had written letters in support of Peck. On April 5, 2024, Bell tweeted that he had spoken to Strong and forgave him for his letter. In December 2024, during a later episode of The Sarah Fraser Show, Bell further clarified that he had an "apologetic and sweet" conversation with both Friedle and Strong, noting that it lasted for two hours. Bell also mentioned that Robin Thicke, son of Alan Thicke (who died in 2016), did not reach out to him, noting; "I don't think [Robin] even connected the dots or anything like that because he has nothing to do with it".

Joanna Kerns issued a statement to the documentary makers that she was unaware of the full extent of the case at the time and now regrets her letter of support. On March 25, 2024, directors Beth Correll and Rich Correll also wrote a statement to Variety expressing regret for supporting Peck before knowing the charges he faced while also apologizing to Bell.

Tom DeSanto, who was an executive producer on the 2000 film X-Men (which featured Peck in an uncredited role), released a statement to People magazine regretting supporting Peck. He wrote, "I want to personally apologize to Drake and his family and emphatically state that had I been fully informed of all the accusations, my support would have been absolutely withheld." Bell responded to DeSanto's apology, saying that his apology "creates a ripple effect", adding that the situation "is a very, very tough thing for everyone involved". On April 2, 2024, during his appearance on the Not Skinny but Not Fat podcast, Bell believed that many of the individuals were fooled by Peck. Bell adds "I don't really harbor any anger — it's just confusion."

== See also ==
- An Open Secret – a 2014 documentary film about child exploitation and sexual abuse in Hollywood in which Brian Peck, the subject of two episodes of Quiet on Set, is mentioned.
- Happy Happy Joy Joy: The Ren and Stimpy Story – a 2020 documentary film about the creation of Nickelodeon's animated series The Ren & Stimpy Show and the downfall of the show's creator John Kricfalusi.
- I'm Glad My Mom Died – a 2022 memoir by Jennette McCurdy in which she describes a strained relationship with a producer at Nickelodeon who she refers to as "The Creator".
