= Hank Aaron: Chasing the Dream =

1995 film

- Directed by: Michael Tollin
- Written by: Michael Tollin
- Produced by: Fredric Golding
- Cinematography: Derek Britt; Chuck Cohen
- Edited by: John Ganem
- Music by: Ed Smart
- Production companies: Turner Entertainment; Tollin/Robbins Productions; Mundy Lane Entertainment
- Distributed by: TBS
- Release date: April 12, 1995
- Running time: 120 minutes
- Country: United States
- Language: English

Hank Aaron: Chasing the Dream is a 1995 American documentary film directed by Michael Tollin. The story follows baseball slugger Hank Aaron's pursuit of Babe Ruth's all-time record for home runs.

== Accolades ==
It was nominated for an Academy Award for Best Documentary Feature and an Emmy Award for Outstanding Informational Series or Special. It also won the Peabody Award.

== See also ==
- List of baseball films
