= Hardball (film) =

2001 film directed by Brian Robbins

- Theatrical release poster
- Directed by: Brian Robbins
- Screenplay by: John Gatins
- Based on: Hardball: A Season in the Projects by Daniel Coyle
- Produced by: Tina Nides; Michael Tollin; Brian Robbins
- Starring: Keanu Reeves; Diane Lane; John Hawkes; D. B. Sweeney; Mike McGlone; Graham Beckel
- Cinematography: Tom Richmond
- Edited by: Ned Bastille
- Music by: Mark Isham
- Production companies: Fireworks Pictures; Nides/McCormick Productions; Tollin/Robbins Productions
- Distributed by: Paramount Pictures
- Release date: September 14, 2001
- Running time: 106 minutes
- Country: United States
- Language: English
- Budget: $32 million
- Box office: $44.1 million

Hardball is a 2001 American sports comedy-drama film co-produced and directed by Brian Robbins and starring Keanu Reeves in the main role, Diane Lane and D. B. Sweeney. The screenplay by John Gatins is based on the book Hardball: A Season in the Projects by Daniel Coyle. The original music score is composed by Mark Isham. The film was released by Paramount Pictures on September 14, 2001, topping the box office the weekend after the September 11 attacks and grossing $44.1 million against a $32 million budget.

== Plot ==
Gambler and ticket scalper Conor O'Neill secretly bets $6,000 on his dead father's account and is now in debt with two bookies. After turning to a stockbroker friend to borrow the money to repay them, he reluctantly agrees to take his friend's place and coach a youth baseball team of troubled fifth-grade kids from Chicago's ABLA housing projects in exchange for $500 each week, for ten weeks.

Some of the players include: Andre Ray Peetes, the captain; Kofi Evans, the best player on the team; Jefferson Albert Tibbs, an overweight, asthmatic player; Jamal, the oldest on the team; Miles Pennfield II, the pitcher, who listens to The Notorious B.I.G.'s "Big Poppa" to pitch well; and Jarius "G-Baby" Evans, Kofi's much younger brother who is too young to play so he becomes Conor's assistant.

Conor's efforts are hindered from the onset by the fact that he does not have nine kids to make up the team. This is because their teacher, Elizabeth "Sister" Wilkes, is making several boys finish a book report. Conor's life is threatened by his bookies for not paying his debts. He is visited by the mother of two boys and her nephew that are allowed to play in exchange for him tutoring them.

Conor works to get the team to support each other and stop trash-talking each other's bad plays, but the team nevertheless loses its first game 16–1, which fosters hostility between the players. Conor brings them together by buying them pizza (trading sports tickets for the pizza) and leads the team to win their second game. The team starts to come together as Conor tries to kindle a romance with Wilkes.

Conor risks everything and makes a $12,000 bet with a new bookie to cover the debt he owes to the other bookies. His stress, already high from his debts, runs higher at the baseball field because Jamal is pulled from playing after a competing coach questions the boy's age and Miles cannot wear headphones while he pitches. Conor takes offense to the league president's threat to be removed, after he voices his objection to his team having to wear ratty T-shirts while the other ones have full uniforms. In protest, he announces it was his last game which draws dissension and resentment from his players.

Conor wins his bet, pays off all his debts, and refuses to turn that bet for $24,000 using the winnings. Conor connects with the kids and finds it harder to leave than he thought. He surprises them with second row seats (behind Sammy Sosa's dugout) to a major league game. He stops gambling; his relationship with Wilkes grows; he gets new uniforms for the players (sponsored by one of his former bookies, who owns a bar); and he leads the team to the championship game.

In the semi-final game, against the same team whose coach Conor had confronted before, the team falls behind, but with two outs in the final inning, with the bases loaded, Conor sends G-Baby, who is the only one left on the bench he can use, to pinch-hit. After the game, Kofi and G-Baby are dropped off at their apartment building, but get caught up in a gunfight between two gangs, and G-Baby is killed by a stray bullet. At his funeral, Conor delivers a eulogy, telling everyone about what happened at G-Baby's at-bat, where he swung the bat and managed a weak hit that won the game. Tearfully, Conor says that in that moment, as G-Baby and the team celebrated, Conor felt he was in a better place and became a better person because of the team.

After the funeral, Conor tells the rest of the team that the league offered to cancel the championship game out of respect for what happened, but the team insists on playing. At the championship game, the team is nearly forced to forfeit without a full roster, but Kofi shows up at the last minute so they can play, and the team wears black armbands for G-Baby as they take the field. The team wins the championship and, along with Conor, holds their championship trophies in celebration.

== Cast ==
- Keanu Reeves as Conor O'Neill
- Diane Lane as Elizabeth Wilkes
- John Hawkes as "Ticky" Tobin
- D. B. Sweeney as Matt Hyland
- Mike McGlone as Jimmy Fleming
- Graham Beckel as Duffy
- Mark Margolis as Fink
- Bryan C. Hearne as Andre Ray Peetes
- Michael Perkins as Kofi Evans
- DeWayne Warren as Jarius "G-Baby" Evans
- Julian Griffith as Jefferson Albert Tibbs
- Michael B. Jordan as Jamal
- A. Delon Ellis Jr. as Miles Pennfield II
- Brian M. Reed as Raymond "Ray-Ray" Bennet
- Kristopher Lofton as Clarence
- Sammy Sosa as himself
- Sterling "Steelo" Brim as Sterling
- Wa-King Conner as Rodney Harris

== Music ==
=== Soundtrack ===
A soundtrack containing hip hop and R&B music was released on September 11, 2001, by Columbia Records. It peaked at #55 on the Billboard 200 and #34 on the Top R&B/Hip-Hop Albums.

== Reception ==
=== Box office ===
The film topped the box office by grossing $10.1 million on its opening weekend, which came shortly after the September 11 attacks. Worldwide, it grossed $44.1 million. The film at No. 2 at the box office that weekend was The Glass House which also starred Diane Lane.

=== Critical response ===
On review aggregation website Rotten Tomatoes, the film holds an approval rating of 41% based on 113 reviews, with an average rating of 4.72/10. The site's critical consensus reads, "Although Hardball contains some touching moments, they are not enough to transcend the sports formula." On Metacritic, which assigns a normalized rating to reviews, the film has a weighted average score of 48 out of 100, based on 25 critics, indicating "mixed or average" reviews. Audiences polled by CinemaScore gave the film an average grade of "A−" on an A+ to F scale.

== See also ==
- List of baseball films
- List of sports films
- List of drama films
- List of hood films

Preceded by The Musketeer	Box office number-one films of 2001 (USA); September 16 – September 23	Succeeded by Don't Say a Word
