= Straight Outta L.A. =

- Directed by: Ice Cube
- Written by: Jon Weinbach
- Produced by: Arunima Dhar; Matt Alvarez; Keith Clinkscales; John Dahl; Joan Lynch; Jamie Patricof; Jon Weinbach
- Starring: Ice Cube; Snoop Dogg; Al Davis; Marcus Allen; Howie Long
- Edited by: Dan Marks
- Distributed by: ESPN Films
- Release dates: April 23, 2010 (Tribeca); May 11, 2010
- Running time: 80 minutes
- Country: United States
- Language: English

Straight Outta L.A. is a 2010 American documentary film in ESPN's 30 for 30 series directed by Ice Cube that covers the NFL team Raiders' time in Los Angeles from 1982 to 1994, and how this overlapped with the local hip hop's transition from party jams to gangsta raps, a move led by the group N.W.A, which seized Raiders symbolism. The film premiered at the 2010 Tribeca Film Festival and aired on ESPN on May 11, 2010.

Produced by Hunting Lane Films, the documentary, beyond interviewing N.W.A founding member Ice Cube, interviews other music figures as well as local civic leaders, Raiders owner Al Davis, other Raiders administrators, and contemporary Raiders players, including, among others, lineman Howie Long and running back Marcus Allen.

In 1982, after the NFL had blocked the Raiders' planned move from Oakland to Los Angeles, the Raiders and the Los Angeles Memorial Coliseum had filed an antitrust lawsuit. After a mistrial, the second jury sided with the plaintiffs, clearing the Raiders' move to Los Angeles. At this same time, the crack epidemic began to unfold in Los Angeles County's predominantly black communities such as South Central Los Angeles and Compton which, arguably disadvantaged by the economic policies of then-President Ronald Reagan, witnessed large increases in gang violence, illegal weapon use, and police brutality.

By 1987, as Los Angeles hip hop, with its dance sounds and party raps, struck some residents as increasingly out of touch, Niggaz with Attitude (N.W.A), had begun recording what it called "reality rap." Joining the national stage in 1988, N.W.A would favor a unified look representing its hometown area. Donning black, one of the Raiders' two colors, and Raiders ball caps, N.W.A extended the Raiders brand's reach and penetration. Ice Cube, a South Central native and Raiders fan, maintains that this backstory is crucial to understanding the Raiders franchise's interaction with Los Angeles.

Ice Cube also performs the documentary theme, "Raider Nation", which has the first and last quartets of The Autumn Wind as an introduction.

== See also ==
- List of American football films
