= R U All That?: Nickelodeon's Search for the Funniest Kid in America =

2003 Nickelodeon television contest

R U All That Logo

R U All That?: Nickelodeon's Search For The Funniest Kid In America (February 2003 – July 2003) was an All That contest shown on Nickelodeon on July 26, 2003.

== Main plot ==
Whoever won the contest would join the other cast members of Nickelodeon's sketch comedy All That. When the contest began in 2003, Christina Kirkman, a regular girl from Massachusetts, entered the contest and became a R U All That finalist, along with 4 other finalists, including Kendre Berry, Ryan Coleman, Colton Gosselin, and Stephanie Matto.

An hour-long special aired on July 26, 2003 and was hosted by Taran Killam and featured the five finalists, the main cast of All That at the time, as well as appearances by Josh Peck, Amanda Bynes, and Nick Cannon, with Bynes and Cannon appearing via satellite. The finalists got to perform with the cast in five popular sketches from the seventh and eighth seasons of the show. The sketches that appeared in this special along with which finalist appeared in them include Randy Quench: Volunteer Fireman (Coleman), Trashin' Fashion (Kirkman), 2-Gether 4-Ever (Gosselin) which would debut in this special and later in the ninth season, Bridgett's Slumber Party (Berry), and Sugar and Coffee (Matto).

At the end of the contest and the special, Christina Kirkman was declared the winner (a.k.a. the Funniest Kid in America) and won the spot as an all-new cast member for Season 9 of All That. Ryan Coleman was declared the runner up. He eventually joined the cast mid-season 9. Although Kendré Berry and Stephanie Matto didn't win, they eventually made featured appearances during the ninth season of All That.

== See also ==
- SNICK
- SNICK On-Air Dare
- TEENick
- All That
