= The Nagano Tapes =

- Pásky z Nagana
- Directed by: Ondřej Hudeček
- Written by: Ondřej Hudeček, Jon Weinbach
- Produced by: Frank Marshall
- Starring: Giancarlo Esposito; Jaromír Jágr; Dominik Hašek
- Production companies: The Kennedy/Marshall Company, Mandalay Sports Media (MSM)
- Release date: 28 February 2018 (Worldwide)
- Running time: 1hr 13min
- Countries: United States; Czech Republic; Canada
- Languages: Czech; English

The Nagano Tapes: Rewound, Replayed & Reviewed (Czech: Pásky z Nagana) is a 2018 documentary film, directed by Ondřej Hudeček and written by Hudeček and Jon Weinbach. The film shows how the Czech Republic won the gold medal in the ice hockey tournament of the 1998 Winter Olympics in Nagano, Japan. It is the first in the Five Rings series of films made for the Olympic Channel.

== Content ==
The film covers the Czech team at the 1998 Winter Olympics in Nagano, including the background and the games they played in during their run to the gold. It is divided into chapters ("tapes", with intertitles designed to look like a labeled video cassette) based on major events or games. Although there is some narration through the film to provide background information, most of the film uses subject interviews and contemporary footage and soundbites from games and reactions to craft its narrative.

It starts by covering the background of restrictive communist rule in then-Czechoslovakia, where several Czech players were allowed by the government or, more likely, defected to play for the NHL. After the fall of the communist regimes in Europe, the NHL takes in more Czech players as part of a larger influx of Eastern European talent into the league, who face xenophobia and stereotyping but ultimately become respected for their intense offensive skills. Increasing commercialism in the NHL is spurred on by the appointment of Gary Bettman as commissioner, who aims to replicate the NBA's Dream Team, his previous workplace. He successfully gets the Olympics to admit NHL players into its hockey games, which leads to an outpour of hype in Canada (home to Wayne Gretzky) and the Czech Republic.

Although the Czechs lose to Russia in the early "round-robin" phase of the tournament, they successfully rise up the ranks and win against the US team despite their aggressive playstyle, letting them move on to the semifinals and inspiring many people in the Czech Republic, which had been beleaguered by the issues brought forth by the transition to capitalism and see the team as a rare unifying force. Facing Canada in the next round, the Czechs tie the game and win the post-overtime shootout in a massive upset, which was controversial due to Gretzky's absence from the shootout roster. In the finals, they face Russia again, a match significant both due to the political undertones attached for many due to historic oppression from the Soviet Union, particularly the brutal suppression of the Prague Spring, and previous Czechoslovak losses to the Soviet Union in Olympic finals. After no goals are scored in the first 50 minutes, Petr Svoboda shoots in the game-winning goal and the Czechs win their first gold in over 20 years, with the team arriving home to a hero's welcome.

=== Intro sequence ===
The opening to the documentary features a homage to the 1995 Japanese anime series Neon Genesis Evangelion, with images of hockey and political unrest displayed in quick succession to "A Cruel Angel's Thesis"; after the documentary was made available for streaming on the Olympics website, the intro went viral on Twitter in 2021 and renewed interest in the film. Hudeček said he included the homage based on his personal experiences and to provide a "strong hook" into the film's topics.

== Cast ==
- Giancarlo Esposito as himself – Narrator
- Jaromír Jágr as himself
- Dominik Hašek as himself

== Production ==
Forty interviews were conducted for the film, with Hudeček stating that being able to interview the players in Czech added more emotion and authenticity to their responses. Producer Frank Marshall also appreciated the frank and honest responses from Canadian players. The film also utilized 60mm archive film from the Games that had been found in a Swiss bank vault.

== Reception ==
The film won the "Outside/Beyond Cinema" (Mimo kino) award at the 2018 Czech Film Critics' Awards.
