= L.A. Clippers Dance Squad =

American reality television series

- Genre: Reality television
- Country of origin: United States
- Original language: English
- No. of seasons: 1
- No. of episodes: 8

Production
- Executive producers: Mike Tollin; Jon Weinbach; Leola Westbrook
- Producer: Cash Warren
- Running time: 42 minutes
- Production company: Mandalay Sports Media

Original release
- Network: E!
- Release: March 15 – May 5, 2016

L.A. Clippers Dance Squad is an American reality television series that premiered on the E! cable network, on March 15, 2016. The eight-episode one-hour series features seven members of a dance team for the Los Angeles Clippers National Basketball Association (NBA) professional basketball team. The show follows the professional and personal lives of the team by showing "what it really takes to make it to the floor of the Staples Center in Los Angeles and dance for basketball fans while representing a high-profile, global brand." The series was announced in November 2015.

Executive producer Jon Weinbach described the show, "The women on this dance squad are pursuing their entertainment dreams, living full lives in L.A., and performing for huge crowds. We’re incredibly excited to team up with E! and the Clippers to showcase this alluring side of the sports world." The cast includes Hannah Cormier, Kellie Janeski, Blair Kim, Athena Perample, Savanna Read, Natalie Tenerelli, and Candace Washington.

== Episodes ==
No.	Title	Original release date
1	"Welcome to the Clippers Dance Squad"	March 15, 2016
2	"Adventures of the Floss Nest"	March 22, 2016
3	"Game On!"	March 29, 2016
4	"Broken China"	April 5, 2016
5	"Personal Foul"	April 14, 2016
6	"Blair's Birthday Blues"	April 19, 2016
7	"L.A. Women"	April 28, 2016
8	"Last Dance, Last Chance"	May 5, 2016
