= Jon Weinbach =

American film producer

- Born: Jon Weinbach; August 13, 1976 (age 50)
- Education: Yale University (B.A.)
- Occupation: President of Skydance Sports
- Notable work: The Last Dance (TV series); Air; The Redeem Team; The Other Dream Team; 30 for 30, Sole Man; Straight Outta L.A.

Jon Weinbach (born August 13, 1976) is an American film and television writer and producer. He is currently President of Skydance Sports and was previously the executive producer and executive vice president for Mandalay Sports Media, a media and production company that focuses on sports entertainment programming.

Weinbach has produced and/or directed movies and television shows such as The Last Dance, The Other Dream Team, Straight Outta L.A. (30 for 30), Sole Man (30 for 30), L.A. Clippers Dance Squad, The Nagano Tapes: Rewound, Replayed & Reviewed, and The Redeem Team. Weinbach wrote Straight Outta L.A. and co-wrote The People's Fighters: Teofilo Stevenson and the Legend of Cuban Boxing and The Other Dream Team.

== Early life and education ==
Weinbach grew up in Los Angeles and attended Beverly Hills High School. Growing up in Los Angeles, Weinbach closely followed Los Angeles sports. Weinbach was influenced by the sports culture in Los Angeles during the 1980s and 1990s. He lived in Los Angeles during the Showtime Era of the Los Angeles Lakers, the 1988 Los Angeles Dodgers season, Wayne Gretzky's tenure with the Los Angeles Kings, and during the era of the Los Angeles Raiders. After high school, Weinbach attended Yale University, and graduated in 1998.

== Career ==
=== Wall Street Journal ===
After graduating from college, Weinbach worked as a reporter at The Wall Street Journal. During this time, he covered the sports business and entertainment. In 2007, he wrote an article for a special report on The Business of Football, which covered Ohio State Buckeyes football's record-breaking budget. In 2008, he wrote a feature on a secret fantasy football league that included some of the financial world's wealthiest executives.

=== Television and film production ===
==== 30 for 30s ====
In 2010, Weinbach produced a documentary for ESPN’s 30 for 30 series called Straight Outta L.A. The film chronicles the move of the Oakland Raiders to Los Angeles and the impact the team had on Southern California in the 1980s. The film premiered at the Tribeca Film Festival.

In 2015, he co-directed and produced Sole Man for ESPN's 30 for 30. The film is a profile of Sonny Vaccaro, who rose from steel town roots in Pennsylvania to become an influential force in both basketball and the athletic shoe industry.

==== The Other Dream Team ====
In 2012, he co-produced The Other Dream Team, a documentary film, that covers the story of the 1992 Lithuania national basketball team and their journey to the bronze medal at the Summer Olympics in Barcelona. The movie was an official selection for the Sundance Film Festival and entered in the U.S. Documentary Competition in 2012.

==== The Nagano Tapes ====
In 2018, he wrote and produced The Nagano Tapes: Rewound, Replayed & Reviewed. This documentary film covers how the Czech Republic won the gold medal in the ice hockey tournament of the 1998 Winter Olympic. The film won the "Best Film Out of Cinema" at the Czech Film Critics' Awards in 2018.

==== The People's Fighter ====
In 2018, Weinbach executive produced The People's Fighters: Teofilo Stevenson and the Legend of Cuban Boxing. The documentary film examines Teófilo Stevenson's career and the phenomenon of boxing in Cuba. Weinbach said: “This film has all the elements that make the Olympics so fascinating – the intersection of politics, culture, huge personalities and incredible athletic achievement."

==== The Last Dance ====
Weinbach co-produced The Last Dance, a 2020 documentary miniseries about the career of Michael Jordan, with particular focus on the 1997–98 Chicago Bulls season. He said of the series: “It's one thing to have Michael Jordan and it's another to have this incredible candor with him.”

Metacritic assigned the series a score of 91 out of 100 based on 12 critics, indicating "universal acclaim".

==== Other Film & TV Projects ====
In 2013, Weinbach co-executive produced "Bluegrass Kingdom: The Gospel of Kentucky Basketball." The documentary tells the history of the Kentucky Wildcats men's basketball.

In 2014, Weinbach co-executive produced "Every Street United," with Xbox Entertainment. The series followed street soccer players from around the world as they competed to play in a 4v4 street soccer game at the 2014 World Cup. He co-wrote and co-executive produced a sports comedy TV series, "The Rebels," with Amazon Studios. The series followed a woman after her husband suddenly dies and leaves her as the sole owner of a pro-football team.

In 2015, he co-executive produced Shaq Inq, a TV comedy movie, that loosely followed Shaq's business empire. He co-produced "Kareem: Minority Of One," which documents the life and career of former NBA player Kareem Abdul-Jabbar. In 2016, Weinbach wrote and produced Patrick and Zo, which chronicled the relationship between Patrick Ewing and Alonzo Mourning. Weinbach executive produced Undrafted, the stories of young men trying achieve their dream of making it to the NFL. Weinbach was nominated for two Sports Emmy Awards for his work on Undrafted.

He produced L.A. Clippers Dance Squad, a reality television series, that featured seven members of a dance team for the Los Angeles Clippers National Basketball Association (NBA) professional basketball team. He said of the show, "The women on this dance squad are pursuing their entertainment dreams, living full lives in L.A., and performing for huge crowds. We’re incredibly excited to team up with E! and the Clippers to showcase this alluring side of the sports world."

In 2018, he produced a baseball documentary, “Walk-Off Stories: Improbably Gibson," which documents Kirk Gibson's 1988 World Series home run.

In 2019, he served as executive producer for "We are LAFC," a ten-part all-access documentary series on Los Angeles FC's inaugural season.

In 2020, Weinbach executive produced Rulon Gardner Won't Die. The film documents Rulon Gardner's life story from growing up in rural Wyoming to his success at the 2000 Olympic Games in Sydney, where he defeated Aleksandr Karelin and achieved the ‘miracle on the mat.’

In 2022, he directed The Redeem Team, which follows the story of the 2008 U.S. Olympic Men's Basketball team, and which was touted as "an immediate hit on Netflix" upon its release, and which won the Sports Emmy for Outstanding Long Documentary. In 2023, he produced the feature film Air, which recounts the history of Nike executive Sonny Vaccaro, who persuaded Michael Jordan to be the face of the brand. The film was directed by Ben Affleck and stars Matt Damon, Affleck, Viola Davis, and Jason Bateman, and The New York Times noted that the message of the film—that Jordan was a real, relatable person and not just a super-talented phenom—was "embraced by critics and audiences."

== Awards ==
Year	Film	Role	Notes
2012	30 for 30 Shorts	Producer	Nominated - Sports Emmy Award - Outstanding New Approaches Sports Programming
2013	The Other Dream Team	Producer	Nominated - Producers Guild of America Award - Outstanding Producer of Documentary Theatrical Motion Pictures
2015	Undrafted	Executive Producer	Nominated - Sports Emmy Award - Outstanding Sports Documentary Series
2017	Undrafted	Executive Producer	Nominated - Sports Emmy Award - Outstanding Serialized Sports Documentary
2018	Counterpunch	Executive Producer	Nominated - Sports Emmy Award - Outstanding Long Sports Documentary
2018	The Nagano Tapes: Rewound, Replayed & Reviewed	Executive Producer	Winner - Czech Film Critics' Awards - Best Film Out of Cinema
2023	The Redeem Team	Director	Winner - Sports Emmy Award - Outstanding Long Documentary, and Nominated - Outstanding Editing – Long Form
