= Kate Taylor (Canadian writer) =

Canadian arts critic and novelist

Katherine Mary Taylor (born 1962) is a Canadian arts critic and novelist who is a cultural columnist at The Globe and Mail. She is author of three novels, Mme Proust and the Kosher Kitchen, A Man in Uniform and Serial Monogamy.

== Biography ==
Katherine Mary Taylor as born in 1962 in Boulogne-Billancourt, France. The child of a Canadian diplomat, Taylor grew up both in Europe and Ottawa.

She attended Glebe Collegiate Institute in Ottawa, and studied history and art history at the University of Toronto. She has an M.A. in journalism from the University of Western Ontario in London.

After working at The London Free Press and The Hamilton Spectator, Taylor joined the copy desk of The Globe and Mail in 1989. She moved into the arts section in 1991 and was appointed theatre critic in 1995. She served in that role until 2003, winning two Nathan Cohen Awards for her reviews.

In 2009, she was awarded the Atkinson Fellowship in Public Policy Journalism to study Canadian cultural sovereignty in the digital age. The results were published in the Toronto Star in September 2010.

== Novels ==
Taylor's first novel, Mme Proust and the Kosher Kitchen, combines the stories of three women: Jeanne Proust, mother of the French novelist Marcel Proust; the fictional Sarah Simon, a French-Jewish refugee living in wartime Toronto and the contemporary narrator, a Montreal translator named Marie Prevost. The novel, published in 2003 by Anchor Canada, won the Commonwealth Writers' Prize for Best First Book (Canada/Caribbean region), the Toronto Book Award and the Canadian Jewish Book Award for fiction.

Taylor's second novel, A Man in Uniform, is a detective story set in Paris at the end of the 19th century and based on the Dreyfus affair. It was published in August 2010 by Doubleday Canada and by Crown Publishing Group in the United States in January 2011.

Her third novel, Serial Monogamy, was published by Doubleday Canada in 2016.
