= The Franchise (2011 TV series) =

Television series

- Season 1 title card
- Country of origin: United States
- No. of seasons: 2
- No. of episodes: 15

Production
- Production company: Major League Baseball Productions

Original release
- Network: Showtime
- Release: July 13, 2011 – August 22, 2012

The Franchise is an American reality-documentary television show that debuted on July 13, 2011, on the Showtime television network. The series follows Major League Baseball (MLB) teams before and during the baseball season.

The first season of the show followed the San Francisco Giants as they defended their World Series title during the 2011 Major League Baseball season. The series focused mostly on the players themselves and followed their lives on and off the field. The players featured included Matt Cain, Barry Zito, Pablo Sandoval, Brian Wilson, Buster Posey, and Ryan Vogelsong. The Franchise provides a rare inside view into a Major League clubhouse, showing the ups and downs of a long and trying professional baseball season.

The second season premiered on July 11, 2012 and featured the Miami Marlins, in their first season in their new park. The season was cut short by one episode.

On January 12, 2013, Showtime Entertainment President David Nevins said the series will return if the "right team and the right story" is found. The Cleveland Guardians have been linked to the show as a possible choice.

== Transmissions ==
Season	Episodes	Originally released	
Season	Episodes	First released	Last released
1	8	July 13, 2011	August 31, 2011
2	7	July 11, 2012	August 22, 2012

== Episodes ==
=== Season 1 (2011) ===
No. overall	No. in season	Title	Original release date
0	0	"San Francisco Giants: Special Preview"	April 13, 2011
1	1	"San Francisco Giants: Episode 1"	July 13, 2011
2	2	"San Francisco Giants: Episode 2"	July 20, 2011
3	3	"San Francisco Giants: Episode 3"	July 27, 2011
4	4	"San Francisco Giants: Episode 4"	August 3, 2011
5	5	"San Francisco Giants: Episode 5"	August 10, 2011
6	6	"San Francisco Giants: Episode 6"	August 17, 2011
7	7	"San Francisco Giants: Episode 7"	August 24, 2011
8	8	"San Francisco Giants: Episode 8"	August 31, 2011

=== Season 2 (2012) ===
No. overall	No. in season	Title	Original release date
0	0	"Miami Marlins: Special Preview"	April 21, 2012
9	1	"Miami Marlins: Episode 1"	July 11, 2012
10	2	"Miami Marlins: Episode 2"	July 18, 2012
11	3	"Miami Marlins: Episode 3"	July 25, 2012
12	4	"Miami Marlins: Episode 4"	August 1, 2012
13	5	"Miami Marlins: Episode 5"	August 8, 2012
14	6	"Miami Marlins: Episode 6"	August 15, 2012
15	7	"Miami Marlins: Episode 7"	August 22, 2012
