= Bryan Hearne =

American actor and singer-songwriter (born 1988)

- Born: Bryan Christopher Hearne; 1988 or 1989 (age 37–38); Staten Island, New York, U.S.
- Occupations: Actor; singer; songwriter
- Years active: 2000–present

Bryan Christopher Hearne (born 1988) is an American actor from Staten Island, New York. Hearne is best known for the role of Andre Ray Peetes in the 2001 film Hardball. In 2002, he became a cast member in the Nickelodeon sketch comedy television series All That from seasons 7–8. He later appeared in the documentary series Quiet on Set: The Dark Side of Kids TV where he alleged that producers compared him to a "piece of charcoal" and disliked getting covered in peanut butter and getting licked by dogs in its spin-off show, SNICK On-Air Dare. Hearne's mother, Tracey Brown, also felt that some of the sketches he was in were racist, including one where he sold Girl Scout cookies like he was selling drugs.

== Career ==
Hearne took a hiatus from the music industry to focus on his newly appointed role as a father, and after being reinspired to sing from meeting his wife, a writer and poet by the name of Daishaundra Nycole Loving, he returned to music with a new name. Known simply now as Hearne, his last name, he provides a soulful R&B sound with a rough edge. In 2020, Hearne released the 'I Won't Move' EP, a social project with deep rap and poetry that speaks a message about love, by any means necessary.

Bryan Hearne later married Daishaundra, and in 2021, they won the Martin Luther King Jr. Spirit Award from Columbia Basin College for Hearne's 'I Won't Move' EP, as well as Daishaundra's poetry and their combined activism and artistic expression through their non-profit organization Urban Poets Society, that supports men, women and children of the BIPOC community through healing spaces and spoken word events. Since 2019, he was the co-CEO of the non-profit organization Urban Poets Society.

== Filmography ==
=== Film ===
Year	Title	Role	Notes
2001	Pootie Tang	Little Trucky	
2001	Hardball	Andre Ray Peetes	
2004	The Best Thief in the World	Schoolyard Kid	
2015	Retrospect	Ben	Short film

=== Television ===
Year	Title	Role	Notes
2000	Third Watch	Kenny	1 episode
2001	Providence	Craig Barnett	1 episode
2002	Taina	Stuart	1 episode
2002–2003	All That	Various	Seasons 7–8
2003	Law & Order	Frank	1 episode
2003	Whoopi	Kid	1 episode
2009	Lie to Me	Track Team Student	1 episode
2009	Everybody Hates Chris	Rapper	2 episodes
2009	The Unit	Will	1 episode
2024	Quiet on Set: The Dark Side of Kids TV	Himself	3 episodes
