= List of programs broadcast by Nickelodeon =

Logo used since March 4, 2023 (Note: The logo's wordmark has been in use since September 28, 2009. The variant displayed is meant for white backgrounds; the main variant has a white wordmark in conjunction with a fully orange splat.)

This is a list of television programs broadcast by Nickelodeon in the United States. The channel was first tested on December 1, 1977, as an experimental local channel in Columbus, Ohio. On April 1, 1979, the channel expanded into a national network named Nickelodeon.

The first program broadcast on Nickelodeon was Pinwheel, a preschool series created by Dr. Vivian Horner, who also conceived the idea for the channel itself. At its launch, Nickelodeon was commercial-free and mainly featured educational shows. By 1984, the channel began accepting traditional commercials and introduced more entertainment-focused programming. In January 1988, the network launched a weekday morning block for preschoolers called Nick Jr., which carried Pinwheel and other educational series. Around the same time, Nickelodeon began investing in original animated shows, which premiered in 1991 under the "Nicktoons" branding. Since then, the channel has consistently aired a mix of original live-action and animated titles.

== Current programming ==
=== Original programming ===
==== Animated ====
Title	Premiere date	Current season	Notes
SpongeBob SquarePants	May 1, 1999	17	
The Loud House	May 2, 2016	10	
The Patrick Star Show	July 9, 2021	6	
Wylde Pak	June 6, 2025	2	

===== Programming from Paramount+ =====
Title	Premiere date	Current season	Notes
Tales of the Teenage Mutant Ninja Turtles	February 17, 2024	2	

==== Live-action ====
===== Comedy =====
Title	Premiere date	Current season	Notes
The Thundermans: Undercover	January 11, 2025	1	

==== Preschool ====
===== Programming from Paramount+ =====
Title	Premiere date	Current season	Notes
Dora	August 5, 2024	4	

==== Specials ====
Title	Premiere date
Nickelodeon Kids' Choice Awards	April 18, 1988

==== Educational series ====
Title	Premiere date
Kids Pick the President	1988
Nick Helps	2019

=== Acquired programming ===
==== Animated ====
Title	Premiere date	Current season	Notes
The Smurfs	September 6, 2021	3	
Sonic Prime	December 7, 2024	3	
The Boss Baby: Back in Business	October 3, 2025	4	

==== Preschool ====
Title	Premiere date	Current season	Notes
Paw Patrol	August 12, 2013	14	(Note: Nickelodeon is named in the credits, but Nickelodeon's studios did not produce the show.)
Peppa Pig	November 15, 2013	9	
Rubble & Crew	February 3, 2023	5	
Tim Rex in Space	August 4, 2025	2	
Mr. Crocodile	February 23, 2026	1	

== Upcoming programming ==
=== Original programming ===
==== Animated ====
===== Programming from Paramount+ =====
Title	Premiere date	Notes
Avatar: Seven Havens	TBA	

==== Live-action ====
===== Programming from Netflix =====
Title	Premiere date	Notes
Hollywood Arts	TBA	

==== Preschool ====
Title	Premiere date	Notes
HexVets and Magic Pets	2026	
Skye's Pup Squad	March 2027	

== Former programming ==
=== Original programming ===
==== Animated ====
Title	Premiere date	Finale date	Note(s)
Doug (Note: Only the first four seasons were produced for Nickelodeon. After the rights to the IP reverted to Jumbo Pictures, which was itself acquired by Disney in 1996, three more seasons were produced for Disney.)	August 11, 1991	January 2, 1994	
Rugrats	August 11, 1991	August 1, 2004	
The Ren & Stimpy Show	August 11, 1991	December 16, 1995	
Rocko's Modern Life	September 18, 1993	November 24, 1996	
Aaahh!!! Real Monsters	October 29, 1994	November 16, 1997	
Hey Arnold!	October 7, 1996	June 8, 2004	
KaBlam!	October 11, 1996	May 27, 2000	
The Angry Beavers	April 19, 1997	November 11, 2003	
CatDog	April 4, 1998	June 15, 2005 (Note: The series moved to Nicktoons after March 30, 2004)	
Oh Yeah! Cartoons	July 19, 1998	August 30, 2002	
The Wild Thornberrys	September 1, 1998	June 11, 2004	
Rocket Power	August 16, 1999	July 30, 2004	
As Told by Ginger	October 25, 2000	November 14, 2006 (Note: The series moved to Nicktoons after July 4, 2004)	
The Fairly OddParents	March 30, 2001	July 26, 2017 (Note: The series moved to Nicktoons after September 16, 2016)	
Invader Zim	March 30, 2001	December 10, 2002 (Note: Episodes 21-26 debuted on DVD in the U.S.)	
ChalkZone	March 22, 2002	August 23, 2008	
The Adventures of Jimmy Neutron, Boy Genius	July 20, 2002	November 25, 2006	
All Grown Up!	April 12, 2003	August 17, 2008	
My Life as a Teenage Robot	August 1, 2003	May 2, 2009 (Note: The series moved to Nicktoons after September 9, 2005)	
Danny Phantom	April 3, 2004	August 24, 2007	
Avatar: The Last Airbender	February 21, 2005	July 19, 2008	
Catscratch	July 9, 2005	February 10, 2007	
The X's	November 25, 2005	November 25, 2006	
El Tigre: The Adventures of Manny Rivera	February 19, 2007	September 13, 2008 (Note: The series moved to Nicktoons after June 20, 2008)	
Tak and the Power of Juju	August 31, 2007	January 24, 2009	
Back at the Barnyard	September 29, 2007	November 12, 2011 (Note: The series moved to Nicktoons after September 18, 2010)	
The Mighty B!	April 26, 2008	June 18, 2011 (Note: The series moved to Nicktoons after January 16, 2010)	
The Penguins of Madagascar (Note: Co-produced by Nickelodeon Animation Studio and DreamWorks Animation. DreamWorks owns the characters and other elements in the show while Paramount retains half of the show's copyright.)	November 28, 2008	December 19, 2015 (Note: The series moved to Nicktoons after November 10, 2012)	
Fanboy & Chum Chum	October 12, 2009	November 2, 2012 (Note: The 9th episode of Season 2 debuted on DVD in the U.S. on August 16, 2011)	
Planet Sheen	October 2, 2010	February 15, 2013 (Note: The series moved to Nicktoons after August 18, 2011)	
T.U.F.F. Puppy	October 2, 2010	April 4, 2015 (Note: The series moved to Nicktoons after August 9, 2013)	
Winx Club (Note: Nickelodeon Animation Studio produced the Winx Club revival series, made up of seasons 5 through 7, in co-development with Rainbow. Viacom co-owns the copyright to these seasons and, until 2023, co-owned the Rainbow studio itself.)	June 27, 2011	April 10, 2016 (Note: The series moved to Nick Jr. after February 16, 2014)	
Kung Fu Panda: Legends of Awesomeness	September 19, 2011	June 29, 2016 (Note: The series moved to Nicktoons after June 29, 2014)	
The Legend of Korra	April 14, 2012	December 19, 2014 (Note: The series moved to Nick.com after July 25, 2014)	
Robot and Monster	August 4, 2012	March 4, 2015 (Note: The series moved to Nicktoons after December 8, 2012 while the last episode premiered on the Noggin app)	
Teenage Mutant Ninja Turtles (Note: Nickelodeon acquired the Teenage Mutant Ninja Turtles franchise in 2009. Paramount owns the copyright to both the 2012 series and Rise of the Teenage Mutant Ninja Turtles.)	September 28, 2012	November 12, 2017 (Note: Episodes 115-121 only aired on Nicktoons)	
Monsters vs. Aliens	March 23, 2013	February 8, 2014	
Sanjay and Craig	May 25, 2013	July 29, 2016	
Breadwinners	February 17, 2014	September 12, 2016 (Note: The series moved to Nicktoons after December 11, 2015)	
Harvey Beaks	March 28, 2015	December 29, 2017 (Note: The series moved to Nicktoons after December 9, 2016)	
Pig Goat Banana Cricket	July 16, 2015	August 11, 2018 (Note: The series moved to Nicktoons after February 26, 2016)	
Bunsen Is a Beast	January 16, 2017	February 10, 2018 (Note: The series moved to Nicktoons after October 14, 2017)	
Welcome to the Wayne	July 24, 2017	May 31, 2019 (Note: The series moved to Nicktoons after September 21, 2017)	
The Adventures of Kid Danger	January 15, 2018	June 14, 2018	
Rise of the Teenage Mutant Ninja Turtles	July 20, 2018	August 7, 2020 (Note: The series moved to Nicktoons after July 6, 2019)	
Middle School Moguls	September 2, 2019	September 29, 2019	
The Casagrandes	October 14, 2019	September 30, 2022	
It's Pony	January 18, 2020	May 26, 2022 (Note: The series moved to Nicktoons after December 5, 2020)	
Middlemost Post	July 9, 2021	October 21, 2022	
Rugrats (2021)	August 20, 2021	March 22, 2024 (Note: The series moved to Nicktoons after May 25, 2023)	(Note: Also a Paramount+ original series.)
Star Trek: Prodigy	December 17, 2021	August 5, 2022	
Big Nate	September 5, 2022	March 22, 2024 (Note: The series moved to Nicktoons after September 27, 2023)	
Monster High	October 6, 2022	October 24, 2024	(Note: Co-produced by Nickelodeon Animation Studio and Mattel Television.)
Rock Paper Scissors	February 11, 2024	October 12, 2026	
The Fairly OddParents: A New Wish	May 17, 2024	August 8, 2024	
Max & the Midknights	October 30, 2024	October 23, 2026	

===== Programming from Paramount+ =====
Title	Premiere date	Final date	Notes
Kamp Koral: SpongeBob's Under Years	April 2, 2021	September 26, 2025	
Transformers: EarthSpark	November 11, 2022	February 1, 2025	(Note: Co-produced by Nickelodeon Animation Studio, Entertainment One (season 1) and Hasbro Entertainment (season 2–4).)

==== Live-action ====
===== Comedy =====
Title	Premiere date	Finale date	Note(s)
The Adventures of Pete & Pete	1989 (shorts); February 9, 1991	1990 (shorts); December 28, 1996	
Hey Dude	July 14, 1989	August 30, 1991	
Welcome Freshmen	February 16, 1991	February 19, 1994	
Clarissa Explains It All	March 23, 1991	October 1, 1994	
Salute Your Shorts	July 4, 1991	September 12, 1992	
The Secret World of Alex Mack	October 8, 1994	January 15, 1998	
My Brother and Me	October 15, 1994	February 2, 1995	
Kenan & Kel	August 17, 1996	January 14, 2001	
Cousin Skeeter	September 1, 1998	May 19, 2001	
100 Deeds for Eddie McDowd	October 16, 1999	April 21, 2002	
The Brothers García	July 23, 2000	August 8, 2004	
Noah Knows Best	October 7, 2000	December 17, 2000	
Taina	January 14, 2001	May 11, 2002	
Romeo!	September 13, 2003	July 23, 2006	
Drake & Josh	January 11, 2004	September 16, 2007	
Ned's Declassified School Survival Guide	September 12, 2004	June 8, 2007	
Unfabulous	September 12, 2004	December 16, 2007	
Zoey 101	January 9, 2005	May 2, 2008	
Mr. Meaty	December 30, 2005	May 23, 2009 (Note: The series moved to Nicktoons after December 9, 2006)	
Just for Kicks	April 9, 2006	August 13, 2006	
Just Jordan	January 7, 2007	April 5, 2008	
The Naked Brothers Band	February 3, 2007	June 13, 2009	
iCarly	September 8, 2007	November 23, 2012	
True Jackson, VP	November 8, 2008	August 20, 2011	
The Troop	September 12, 2009	May 8, 2013 (Note: The series moved to Nicktoons after August 6, 2011)	
Big Time Rush	November 28, 2009	July 25, 2013	
Victorious	March 27, 2010	February 2, 2013	
Supah Ninjas	January 17, 2011	April 27, 2013	
Bucket & Skinner's Epic Adventures	July 1, 2011	May 1, 2013 (Note: The series moved to TeenNick after June 9, 2012)	
How to Rock	February 4, 2012	December 8, 2012	
Marvin Marvin	November 24, 2012	April 27, 2013	
Sam & Cat	June 8, 2013	July 17, 2014	
The Haunted Hathaways	July 13, 2013	March 5, 2015	
The Thundermans	October 14, 2013	May 25, 2018	
Every Witch Way	January 1, 2014	July 30, 2015	
Henry Danger	July 26, 2014	March 21, 2020	
Nicky, Ricky, Dicky & Dawn	September 13, 2014	August 4, 2018	
Max & Shred	October 6, 2014	March 31, 2016 (Note: The series moved to Nicktoons after July 11, 2015)	
100 Things to Do Before High School	November 11, 2014	February 27, 2016	
Bella and the Bulldogs	January 17, 2015	June 25, 2016	
Make It Pop	March 26, 2015	August 20, 2016	
Talia in the Kitchen	July 6, 2015	December 23, 2015	
Game Shakers	September 12, 2015	June 8, 2019	
WITS Academy	October 5, 2015	October 30, 2015	
School of Rock	March 12, 2016	April 8, 2018	
The Other Kingdom	April 10, 2016	June 19, 2016	
Legendary Dudas	July 9, 2016	August 13, 2016	
Knight Squad	February 19, 2018	April 20, 2019	
Star Falls	March 31, 2018	September 2, 2018 (Note: The series moved to TeenNick after July 28, 2018)	
Cousins for Life	November 24, 2018	June 8, 2019	
Tyler Perry's Young Dylan	February 29, 2020	April 30, 2025	
Danger Force	March 28, 2020	February 21, 2024	
Side Hustle	November 7, 2020	June 30, 2022	
Drama Club	March 20, 2021	May 22, 2021	
The Barbarian and the Troll	April 2, 2021	June 25, 2021	
iCarly (2021)	June 17, 2021	July 27, 2023	
That Girl Lay Lay	September 23, 2021	March 20, 2024	
Warped!	January 16, 2022	March 31, 2022	
The Fairly OddParents: Fairly Odder	April 21, 2022	February 2, 2023	
The Really Loud House	November 3, 2022	November 26, 2024	
Erin & Aaron	April 20, 2023	June 29, 2023	

===== Drama =====
Title	Premiere date	Finale date	Note(s)
The Third Eye	January 4, 1983	May 31, 1985	
Fifteen	February 2, 1991	June 26, 1994	
Space Cases	March 2, 1996	January 27, 1997	
The Mystery Files of Shelby Woo	March 16, 1996	October 25, 1998	
The Journey of Allen Strange	November 8, 1997	April 23, 2000	
Animorphs	September 12, 1998	October 8, 1999	
Caitlin's Way	March 11, 2000	April 28, 2002	
House of Anubis	January 1, 2011	June 17, 2013 (Note: The series moved to TeenNick after February 7, 2013)	
Deadtime Stories	October 3, 2013	November 14, 2013	
I Am Frankie	September 4, 2017	October 4, 2018	
Are You Afraid of the Dark?	October 11, 2019	August 13, 2022	
The Astronauts	November 13, 2020	January 15, 2021	

===== Game shows =====
Title	Premiere date	Finale date	Note(s)
Double Dare: Family Double Dare; Super Sloppy Double Dare; Super Special Double Dare; Double Dare 2000; Double Dare (2018 revival)	October 6, 1986	February 7, 1993	
Double Dare: Family Double Dare; Super Sloppy Double Dare; Super Special Double Dare; Double Dare 2000; Double Dare (2018 revival)	January 22, 2000	November 10, 2000	
Double Dare: Family Double Dare; Super Sloppy Double Dare; Super Special Double Dare; Double Dare 2000; Double Dare (2018 revival)	June 25, 2018	December 20, 2019	
Finders Keepers	November 2, 1987	March 10, 1989	
Think Fast	May 1, 1989	March 30, 1990	
Make the Grade	October 2, 1989	September 14, 1990	
Wild & Crazy Kids	July 4, 1990	December 1, 1992	
Wild & Crazy Kids	July 29, 2002	October 7, 2002	
Get the Picture	March 18, 1991	December 6, 1991	
What Would You Do?	August 31, 1991	November 26, 1993	
Nick Arcade	January 4, 1992	March 12, 1993	
Nickelodeon Guts	September 19, 1992	August 31, 1995	
Legends of the Hidden Temple	September 11, 1993	November 24, 1995	
Global Guts	September 5, 1995	December 10, 1995	
Figure It Out: Figure It Out: Family Style; Figure It Out: Wild Style	July 7, 1997	December 12, 1999	
Figure It Out: Figure It Out: Family Style; Figure It Out: Wild Style	June 11, 2012	July 16, 2013	
You're On!	August 3, 1998	December 5, 1998	
Robot Wars	August 25, 2002	October 6, 2002	
Scaredy Camp	October 22, 2002	August 13, 2003	
My Family's Got Guts	September 15, 2008	September 27, 2008	
BrainSurge	September 28, 2009	May 9, 2014	
Webheads	June 2, 2014	July 3, 2014	
Paradise Run	February 1, 2016	January 26, 2018	
Keep It Spotless	March 26, 2018	November 20, 2018	
Are You Smarter than a 5th Grader?	June 10, 2019	November 3, 2019	
The Crystal Maze	January 24, 2020	March 27, 2020	
Nickelodeon's Unfiltered	July 11, 2020	November 11, 2021	
Tooned In	February 8, 2021	July 1, 2022	

===== Variety programs =====
Title	Premiere date	Finale date	Note(s)
Video Comics	April 1, 1979	August 31, 1981	
By the Way	April 1, 1979	March 1980	
Nickel Flicks	April 1, 1979	December 1979	
America Goes Bananaz	April 1, 1979	September 28, 1980	
Children's Classics	December 3, 1979	March 30, 1980	
Hocus Focus	December 31, 1979	April 4, 1981	
First Row Features	January 27, 1980	December 30, 1981	
PopClips	March 31, 1980	April 4, 1981	
Livewire	September 29, 1980	May 3, 1986	
Reggie Jackson's World of Sports	December 1, 1981	March 31, 1985	
Kids' Writes	December 25, 1981	December 20, 1987	
Against the Odds	July 4, 1982	1984	
Standby...Lights! Camera! Action!	October 23, 1982	December 20, 1985	
Mr. Wizard's World	October 3, 1983	1990	
Nick Rocks	June 8, 1984	March 26, 1989	
Out of Control	October 4, 1984	1985	
National Geographic Explorer	April 7, 1985	January 11, 1986	
Turkey Television	June 3, 1985	December 31, 1988	
Rated K: For Kids by Kids	November 1, 1986	1988	
Sixteen Cinema	October 4, 1987	May 28, 1989	
Don't Just Sit There!	July 1, 1988	May 25, 1991	
Kids' Court	September 10, 1988	1989	
Total Panic	April 1, 1989	September 30, 1990	
SK8-TV	July 4, 1990	September 28, 1991	
Outta Here!	August 13, 1990	January 4, 1991	
Launch Box	May 9, 1991	March 11, 1994	
The Nick Hit List	July 6, 1991	1992	
Wild Side Show	February 21, 1992	December 30, 1995	
Nick News with Linda Ellerbee	April 18, 1992	December 15, 2015	
Roundhouse	August 15, 1992	December 24, 1996	
Weinerville	July 11, 1993	1997	
All That	April 16, 1994	October 22, 2005	
All That	June 15, 2019	December 17, 2020	
The Amanda Show	October 16, 1999	September 21, 2002	
The Nick Cannon Show	January 19, 2002	February 15, 2003	
Splash TV	June 2, 2002	August 31, 2003	
You Gotta See This	July 21, 2012	April 1, 2014	
AwesomenessTV	July 1, 2013	March 7, 2015	
ReactToThat	December 15, 2014	January 1, 2015	
All In with Cam Newton	June 3, 2016	November 16, 2016	
Crashletes	July 5, 2016	May 3, 2019	
Jagger Eaton's Mega Life	September 9, 2016	April 2, 2017	
The Dude Perfect Show	July 16, 2017	May 8, 2019	
Lip Sync Battle Shorties	October 15, 2017	February 1, 2019	
The Substitute	April 1, 2019	February 25, 2021	
America's Most Musical Family	November 1, 2019	January 17, 2020	
Top Elf	November 29, 2019	December 17, 2020	
Group Chat	May 23, 2020	October 31, 2020	
Cake My Day	July 17, 2020		
Unleashed	October 22, 2020	December 17, 2020	
Nick News	June 29, 2020	March 20, 2024	
NFL Slimetime	September 15, 2021	February 11, 2026	

===== Programming from Paramount+ =====
Title	Premiere date	Finale date	Note(s)
Knuckles	August 12, 2024	December 28, 2024	

==== Preschool ====
Title	Premiere date	Finale date	Note(s)
Pinwheel	December 1, 1977	July 6, 1990	
Eureeka's Castle	September 4, 1989	June 30, 1995	
Nick Jr. Rocks	October 1991	1994	
Allegra's Window	October 24, 1994	December 8, 1997	
Gullah Gullah Island	October 24, 1994	January 9, 1998	
Blue's Clues	September 8, 1996	August 6, 2006	
Binyah Binyah!	February 2, 1998	February 6, 1998	
Little Bill	November 28, 1999	February 6, 2004	
Dora the Explorer	August 14, 2000	August 9, 2019	
Oswald (Note: Co-produced by Nickelodeon Animation Studio and HIT Entertainment. Both companies co-own the copyright.)	August 20, 2001	September 19, 2003	
Blue's Room	August 10, 2004	March 29, 2007	
The Backyardigans	October 11, 2004	July 12, 2013	
Go, Diego, Go!	September 6, 2005	September 16, 2011	
Holly Hobbie & Friends (specials)	February 10, 2006	September 7, 2007	
Wonder Pets!	March 3, 2006	July 20, 2013	
Ni Hao, Kai-Lan	February 7, 2008	August 21, 2011	
The Fresh Beat Band	August 24, 2009	December 7, 2013	(Note: The series moved to Nick Jr. after June 8, 2012)
Team Umizoomi	January 25, 2010	April 24, 2015	
Bubble Guppies	January 24, 2011	October 21, 2016	
Bubble Guppies	September 27, 2019	June 30, 2023	
Wallykazam!	February 3, 2014	September 9, 2017	(Note: The series moved to Nick Jr. after February 12, 2016)
Dora and Friends: Into the City!	August 18, 2014	February 5, 2017	(Note: The series moved to Nick Jr. after February 5, 2016)
Blaze and the Monster Machines	October 13, 2014	December 1, 2025	
Nick Jr. Puppies	March 2, 2015	January 2016	
Fresh Beat Band of Spies	June 15, 2015	February 24, 2016	(Note: The series aired on Nick from June 29 to July 2, 2015)
Mutt & Stuff	July 10, 2015	November 1, 2017	
Shimmer and Shine	August 24, 2015	February 9, 2020	(Note: The series moved to Nick Jr. after March 24, 2018)
Nella the Princess Knight	February 6, 2017	July 21, 2021	(Note: The series moved to Nick Jr. after December 22, 2017)
Sunny Day	August 21, 2017	March 1, 2020	(Note: The series moved to Nick Jr. after August 10, 2018)
Zoofari	February 5, 2018	October 19, 2018	(Note: The series moved to Nick Jr. after February 15, 2018)
Butterbean's Café	November 12, 2018	November 1, 2020	(Note: The series moved to Nick Jr. after August 1, 2019)
Blue's Clues & You!	November 11, 2019	February 15, 2024	(Note: The series moved to Nick Jr. after September 11, 2023)
Santiago of the Seas	October 9, 2020	July 27, 2023	(Note: The series moved to Nick Jr. after January 13, 2023)
Baby Shark's Big Show! (Note: Co-produced by Nickelodeon Animation Studio and SmartStudy. SmartStudy owns the characters and other elements in the show while Paramount retains half of the show's copyright.)	December 11, 2020	January 14, 2025	(Note: The series moved to Nick Jr. after December 21, 2023)
The BeatBuds, Let's Jam!	June 7, 2021	June 11, 2021	
Face's Music Party	June 3, 2022	December 11, 2023	(Note: The series aired its final episode on Nick Jr. on November 26, 2022)
The Tiny Chef Show	September 9, 2022	March 6, 2025	(Note: The series moved to Nick Jr. after November 11, 2024)
Bossy Bear	March 6, 2023	February 29, 2024	(Note: The series moved to Nick Jr. after May 18, 2023)
Super Duper Bunny League	April 19, 2025	December 17, 2025	

==== Programming from Noggin ====
Title	Premiere date	Finale date	Note(s)
Phred on Your Head Show	June 6, 1999	February 22, 2001	
A Walk in Your Shoes	April 30, 2000	December 15, 2003	
Big Kids	March 8, 2001	March 30, 2001	
On the Team	May 2, 2001	June 22, 2001	
Sponk!	September 16, 2001	January 3, 2002	
Oobi	April 2002 (shorts); April 7, 2003 (long-form)	April 7, 2003	
Girls v. Boys	August 10, 2003	August 24, 2003	
Jack's Big Music Show	September 12, 2005	February 7, 2007	
The Upside Down Show	October 13, 2006		
Kinderwood	December 3, 2020		

==== Miniseries/other ====
Title	Premiere date	Finale date	Note(s)
The Big Help	1994	2001	
The Big Help	2010	2012	
U to U	November 5, 1994	March 2, 1996	
Natalie's Backseat Traveling Web Show	1996	1998	
Nickellennium	January 1, 2000		
Action League Now! (package series)	November 25, 2001	February 10, 2002	
W.A.C.K.	2003		
Worldwide Day of Play	October 2, 2004	September 28, 2019	
Let's Just Play Go Healthy Challenge	April 30, 2006	September 29, 2007	
Dance on Sunset	March 29, 2008	June 21, 2008	
The Big Green Help	2008	2010	
Rugrats Pre-School Daze	November 16, 2008	December 7, 2008	
The Fairly OddParents: Wishology	May 1, 2009	May 3, 2009	
Nickelodeon HALO Awards	December 11, 2009	November 26, 2017	
7 Secrets	April 24, 2010	November 27, 2010	
SpongeBob SquarePants: Legends of Bikini Bottom	January 28, 2011	June 11, 2011	
SpongeBob's Runaway Roadtrip	November 7, 2011	November 11, 2011	
Nickelodeon Kids' Choice Sports	July 17, 2014	August 10, 2019	
Lost in the West	May 28, 2016	May 30, 2016	
NFL on Nickelodeon	January 10, 2021	January 11, 2025	
Nickelodeon Holiday Specials	December 5, 2015	December 15, 2022	
Super Bowl LVIII	February 11, 2024		

=== Acquired programming ===
==== Animated ====
- Belle and Sebastian (1984–1989)
- Danger Mouse (1984–1988; 1991–1994)
- The Adventures of The Little Prince (1985–1989)
- Bananaman (1985–1987)
- Star Trek: The Animated Series (1985–1990)
- The Mysterious Cities of Gold (1986–1990)
- Spartakus and the Sun Beneath the Sea (1986–1991)
- Inspector Gadget (1987–1992; 1996–2000)
- Count Duckula (1988–1993) (co-produced)
- Doctor Snuggles (1988–1990)
- Heathcliff (1988–1993)
- Looney Tunes (1988–1999)
- Nickelodeon's Most Wanted: Yogi Bear (1990–1993)
- Dennis the Menace (1991–2003)
- Bullwinkle's Moose-o-Rama (1992–1996)
- Jim Henson's Muppet Babies (1992–1999)
- Underdog (1992–1994)
- The Adventures of Tintin (1994–1997)
- Beetlejuice (1994–1998)
- Gumby (1994–1996)
- Alvin and the Chipmunks (1995–1997)
- Tiny Toon Adventures (1995–1999; 2002–2004)
- Garfield and Friends (1997–2000)
- The Brady Kids (1998)
- You're on Nickelodeon, Charlie Brown (1998–2000)
- Ace Ventura: Pet Detective (1999–2000)
- The Brothers Flub (1999–2000)
- Blaster's Universe (2000)
- Pelswick (2000–2002)
- Stickin' Around (2000)
- Pinky and the Brain (2000–2003)
- Animaniacs (2001–2003)
- Butt-Ugly Martians (2001–2003)
- Men in Black: The Series (2002–2003)
- Speed Racer X (2002–2003)
- Super Duper Sumos (2002–2003)
- Yakkity Yak (2003–2004)
- Angela Anaconda (2004)
- 6teen (2005–2006)
- Martin Mystery (2005)
- My Dad the Rock Star (2005)
- Kappa Mikey (2006–2007)
- Shuriken School (2006)
- Wayside (2007–2008)
- Digimon Fusion (2013)
- Rabbids Invasion (2013–2017)
- Rocket Monkeys (2013)
- Alvinnn!!! and the Chipmunks (2015–2023)
- Miraculous: Tales of Ladybug & Cat Noir (2015–2016)
- Oggy and the Cockroaches (2015)
- Kuu Kuu Harajuku (2016–2017)
- Regal Academy (2016–2018)
- Mysticons (2017–2018)
- Rainbow Butterfly Unicorn Kitty (2019)
- Lego City Adventures (2019–2020)
- Lego Jurassic World: Legend of Isla Nublar (2019–2020)
- Ollie's Pack (2020–2021)
- Zokie of Planet Ruby (2025)
- Unicorn Academy (2025)

==== Live-action ====
===== Comedy =====
- Hangin' In (1985)
- Dennis the Menace (1985–1994)
- The Donna Reed Show (1986)
- My Three Sons (1986)
- Mister Ed (1986)
- The Monkees (1986–1988)
- The Bad News Bears (1987–1988)
- The Patty Duke Show (1989–1990)
- Camp Runamuck (1990)
- Mork & Mindy (1991)
- The Wonder Years (1997–1999)
- The Brady Bunch (1998–2001)
- Batman (2002)
- Sabrina the Teenage Witch (2003–2007)
- America's Funniest Home Videos (2007)
- Fred: The Show (2012)
- So Little Time (2015)
- Rank the Prank (2016)
- Hunter Street (2017–2021)

===== Action =====
- Power Rangers Samurai (2011–2012)
- Power Rangers Megaforce (2013–2014)
- Power Rangers Dino Charge (2015–2016)
- Power Rangers Ninja Steel (2017–2018)
- Power Rangers Beast Morphers (2019–2020)
- Power Rangers Dino Fury (2021)

===== Reality =====
- American Ninja Warrior (2019)

===== Drama =====
- Adventures in Rainbow Country (1981–1983)
- Matt and Jenny (1981–1983)
- The Tomorrow People (1981–1984; 1993–1995)
- The Adventures of Black Beauty (1982–1987)
- Lassie (1984–1996)^{5}
- Powerhouse (1984–1986)
- Zoo Family (1986–1988)
- Flipper (1990–1996)
- Are You Afraid of the Dark? (1991–1996; 1999–2000)
- Land of the Lost (1995–1997)
- Ship to Shore (1996–1997)
- H_{2}O: Just Add Water (2008–2009)^{3}
- Ride (2017)
- The Bureau of Magical Things (2018)
- California Dreaming (2021)

===== Variety programs =====
- Dusty's Treehouse (1980–1984)
- What Will They Think of Next! (1980–1984)
- Vegetable Soup (1981–1982)
- You Can't Do That on Television (1981–1990)
- Studio See (1981–1983)
- Spread Your Wings (1982)
- Going Great (October 1, 1983 – August 31, 1986)
- Vic's Vacant Lot (1984–85)
- The Shari Show (1987–1988)
- Kidsworld (1990–1992)
- The Muppet Show (1994–1996)
- 3-2-1 Contact (September 5, 2000 – January 24, 2003)

==== Preschool ====
- Today's Special (1982–1991)
- Curious George (1986)
- Adventures of the Little Koala (1987–1993)
- Maple Town (1987–1989)
- Sharon, Lois & Bram's Elephant Show (1987–1994)
- Noozles (1988–1993)
- The World of David the Gnome (1988–1995)
- Fred Penner's Place (1989–1993)
- Maya the Bee (1990–1993)
- The Littl' Bits (1991–1995)
- Grimm's Fairy Tale Classics (1992–1995)
- Cappelli & Company (1993–1994)
- Janosch's Dream World (1993–1994)
- Papa Beaver's Storytime (1994–1997)
- The Adventures of Timmy the Tooth (1995–96)
- The Busy World of Richard Scarry (1995–2000)
- Little Bear (1995–2003)
- Rupert (1995–98)
- The Wubbulous World of Dr. Seuss (1996–2000)
- The Little Twins (1998)
- Franklin (1999–2004)
- Kipper (1999–2001)
- Maisy (1999–2001)
- Maggie and the Ferocious Beast (2000–2005)
- Shining Time Station (2000)
- Bob the Builder (2001–2004)
- Max & Ruby (2003–2019)
- Rubbadubbers (2003–2005)
- Tweenies (2003)
- LazyTown (2004–2007)
- Miss Spider's Sunny Patch Friends (2004–06)
- Wow! Wow! Wubbzy! (2006–10)
- Yo Gabba Gabba! (2007–2011)
- Olivia (2009)
- Dino Dan (2010)
- Franklin and Friends (2012)
- Mike the Knight (2012)
- Tickety Toc (2012)
- Peter Rabbit (2013–2016)
- Rusty Rivets (2016–2020)
- Thomas & Friends (2017–2019)
- Top Wing (2017–2020)
- Abby Hatcher (2018–2022)
- 44 Cats (2019)
- The Adventures of Paddington (2019–2025)
- Corn & Peg (2019–2020)
- Ricky Zoom (2019–2020)
- Ryan's Mystery Playdate (2019–2023)
- Deer Squad (2021)
- Kiri and Lou (2022–2023)

== Programming blocks ==
=== Current ===
- Nick at Nite (July 1, 1985 – present)
- Nick Jr. (January 4, 1988 – present; name also used for a standalone channel since 2009)

=== Former ===
- AfterToons (April 10 – November 24, 2023)
- Alpha Repertory Television Service (forerunner of A&E Network, April 12, 1981 – January 1985, became its own channel in 1985)
- BubbleCast (February 5 – June 2001)
- Cartoon Kablooey (1990–91; 1993–95)
- Friday Night Nicktoons (January 5 – August 31, 2001; July 12, 2002 – February 27, 2004; September 24 – December 17, 2004)
- Gotta See Saturdays (September 22, 2012 – April 27, 2013)
- Kids Only Weekend (1985–89)
- Hollywood Hang (September 14, 2009 – 2010)
- Maxed-Out Mondays (December 5–26, 1994)
- ME TV (February 19 – May 25, 2007)
- Morning Mystery Pick (December 9, 2002 – January 3, 2003)
- Nickamania (May 1 – July 4, 1993)
- Nick Play Date (February 2, 2009 – February 29, 2012)
- Nick: The Smart Place to Play (March 1, 2012 – May 2, 2014)
- Nickelodeon Games & Sports (November 9, 1998 – February 20, 1999)
- Nick Rewind (April 16 – August 20, 2006; September 24, 2006; December 31, 2006)
- Nickelodeon SPLAT! (July 3 – October 2, 2004)
- Nicktoons TV (May 16, 1998 – August 27, 2004)
- Nickel-O-Zone (August 31, 1998 – 2000)
- Nick Studio 10 (February 18 – June 17, 2013)
- Noggin on Nickelodeon (2000–01)
- Nick's Saturday Morning (May 21, 2005 – June 14, 2008)
- Nick's Saturday Night (September 13, 2014 – November 20, 2021)
- Nick in the Afternoon (1995–98)
- The O Zone (1991–93)
- Prime Time Nicktoons (March 12 - September 17, 2004)
- Saturday Morning Hang Zone with Lincoln Loud (February 25 – March 25, 2017)
- Saturday Morning Nicktoons (2002–2004)
- SLAM! (August 25, 2002 – March 2003)
- Slime Time Live (January 24, 2000 – July 2, 2004)
  - Friday Night Slimetime (September 23, 2005 – March 24, 2006)
  - Slime Across America
  - Summer Slime Live
- SNICK (August 15, 1992 – January 29, 2005)
- Special Delivery (1980–93)
- TEENick (March 6, 2001 – February 1, 2009, name currently used for the TeenNick channel)
- TEENick Saturday Night (2005–06)
- That New Thursday Night (September 23, 2021 – June 29, 2023)
- Throwback Thursday (June – August 2014)
- U-Pick Live (October 14, 2002 – May 27, 2005)

=== Movie presentations ===
- Star Channel (1979–80)
- Nick's Family Picks (June 7, 1981 – 1982)
- Muppet Matinee (July 10, 1993 – October 1, 1994)
- Nickelodeon Sunday Movie Toons (2002–03)
- Nick Flicks (aired in place of the SNICK block; July 7, 2001 – January 12, 2002, June 29 – September 7, 2002)

=== Seasonal ===
==== Current holiday blocks ====
- Thanksgiving Weekend on Nick (Thanksgiving: November 26, 2009 – present)
- Nick Holidays (Christmas: December 25, 2009 – present)

==== Former holiday blocks ====
- 10 Nights of Frights (Halloween: October 21–31, 2011)
- 12 Days of Drake & Josh (New Year's Eve: December 20–31, 2009)
- Crush Week (Valentine's Day: February 5, 2011 – February 8, 2015)
- Ha! Ha! Holidays (Christmas: December 1, 2004 – December 25, 2008)
- Halloween in September (Fall: September 5–21, 2009)
- Nick New Years (New Year's Eve: December 31, 1993 – December 31, 1999)
- Nick Horrors (Halloween: October 31, 2002 – October 31, 2009)
- Nick or Treat! (Halloween: October 1, 1985 – October 31, 2002)
- Nickmas (Christmas: December 2, 2002 – December 25, 2003)
- Non-Stop Nicktoons Weekend (Thanksgiving: November 19, 1993 – November 30, 2002)
- Shriek Week (Halloween: October 2001 – October 2002; October 2006; October 25–31, 2009)
- Shriekin' Weekend (Halloween: October 27, 2005 – October 31, 2006)
- Shocktober (Halloween: October 1–31, 2007)
- Shocktober 2 (Halloween: October 1–31, 2008)
- SNICKtoons Xmas Gift Pack (Christmas: December 1, 1994 – December 25, 1997)
- Super Stuffed Nicksgiving Weekend (Thanksgiving: November 22, 2003 – November 29, 2009)
- Super Stuffed Nicktoons Weekend (Thanksgiving: November 22, 2007 – November 30, 2008; November 23, 2013)
- Super Stuffed Thanksgiving Weekend (Thanksgiving: November 21, 2011 – November 27, 2011)
- Valentine's Day Mushfest (Valentine's Day: February 14, 1993 – February 14, 1996)

==== Former Summer blocks ====
- Henry & June's Nicktoons Summer Jam (July 5 – September 3, 1999)
- Jam Packed June (June 1–30, 2008)
- Nicktoons Summer Beach House (May 27, 2002 – September 4, 2003)
- The Nicktoons Summer Film Festival (June 11 – September 3, 2004)
- Non-Stop 5 at 5 (July 1 – August 28, 2008)
- Sizzling Summer (July 1 – September 1, 2008)
- Summer Invasion (June 17, 2012 – 2013)
- Summer on Nick (July 22, 2004 – September 26, 2007)
- Summer PickNick (May 27, 2002 – September 4, 2003)
- SpongeBob's Nicktoons Summer Splash (June 28, 2000 – September 3, 2001)
- Surf and Burp (June 30, 2006 – September 19, 2008)

== See also ==
- Nick on CBS
- List of programs broadcast by Nick at Nite
- List of programs broadcast by Nicktoons
- List of programs broadcast by Noggin
- List of programs broadcast by TeenNick
- List of programs broadcast by the Nick Jr. Channel
- List of Nickelodeon Animation Studio productions
- List of Nickelodeon original films
- List of Nickelodeon short films
