= List of programs broadcast by TeenNick =

Current TeenNick logo used since January 1, 2024. (Note: The logo's wordmark has been in use since September 28, 2009. Additionally, this is a variant meant to be used for white backgrounds; the main variant has a yellow (for Teen) and white (for Nick) wordmark in conjunction with a fully orange splat.)

The following is a list of programs that have been broadcast by the TeenNick cable channel. It was launched as a merge of two former teen-oriented programming blocks: TEENick on Nickelodeon and The N on Noggin. The channel still airs reruns of shows that originated on the TEENick block (such as iCarly), but as of the mid-2010s, all original productions from the Noggin block have been dropped.

TeenNick's lineup primarily features reruns of programming that had aired on the main Nickelodeon channel.

== Current programming ==
=== Programming from Nickelodeon ===
==== Live-action ====
Title	Premiere date	Source(s)
The Thundermans	October 31, 2013	(Note: Ended but still airing reruns.)
Henry Danger	September 18, 2014	
The Thundermans: Undercover	January 22, 2025	

==== Animated ("Nicktoons") ====
Title	Premiere date	Source(s)
The Loud House*	November 24, 2017	
Max & the Midknights*	October 30, 2024	

== Former programming ==
=== TeenNick ===
An asterisk (*) indicates that the program had new episodes aired on The N / TeenNick.

==== Original programming ====
===== Reality =====
Title	Premiere date	Finale date	Note(s)
The N's Student Body	July 11, 2008	August 24, 2008	
Queen Bees	July 11, 2008	January 1, 2012	
The Nightlife	August 5, 2010	August 26, 2010	
Nick Cannon Presents: Fresh Artist	October 27, 2018	May 18, 2019	

===== Drama =====
Title	Premiere date	Finale date	Note(s)
Hollywood Heights	August 13, 2012	October 5, 2012	

===== Comedy =====
Title	Premiere date	Finale date	Note(s)
Gigantic	October 8, 2010	April 22, 2011	
Alien Dawn	July 27, 2014		Burned off from Nicktoons

===== Music =====
Title	Premiere date	Finale date	Note(s)
TeenNick's Obsess This	May 1, 2010	January 27, 2013	
TeenNick Top 10	February 2, 2013	March 17, 2018	

==== Programming from The N (block) ====
Title	Premiere date	Finale date	Note(s)
South of Nowhere*	January 1, 2008	December 12, 2008	
O'Grady	July 14, 2013	July 21, 2013	

==== Acquired programming from The N (block) ====
Title	Premiere date	Finale date	Note(s)
Beyond the Break	January 1, 2008	June 25, 2009	(Note: Nickelodeon is named in the credits, but Nickelodeon's studios did not produce the show.)

==== Programming from Nickelodeon ====
===== Live-action =====
====== Comedy ======
Title	Premiere date	Last aired date	Source(s)
Just Jordan	December 31, 2007	December 26, 2008	
The Naked Brothers Band	December 31, 2007	May 25, 2009	
Kenan & Kel	December 31, 2007	May 31, 2014	(Note: This show continued to air on TeenNick after it took over The N's channel space on September 28, 2009.) (Note: The show previously aired on TEENick, The N block, and The N channel. It premiered on TeenNick on its launch date, September 28, 2009.)
Unfabulous	December 31, 2007	January 12, 2016	
Drake & Josh	December 31, 2007	January 16, 2022	
Zoey 101	December 31, 2007	October 19, 2026	
Romeo!	January 2, 2008	December 26, 2008	
Ned's Declassified School Survival Guide	January 19, 2008	May 13, 2016	
iCarly	January 19, 2008	November 2, 2026	
The Brothers García	April 7, 2008	May 19, 2008	
True Jackson, VP	November 9, 2008	April 2, 2023	
The Troop	September 26, 2009	July 3, 2011	
Big Time Rush	December 4, 2009	April 11, 2021	
Victorious	April 12, 2010	September 21, 2026	
Supah Ninjas	February 6, 2011	September 8, 2014	
Bucket & Skinner's Epic Adventures*	July 11, 2011	August 21, 2013	
How to Rock	February 6, 2012	January 11, 2016	
Marvin Marvin	October 17, 2013	September 29, 2014	
Every Witch Way	January 2, 2014	April 5, 2020	
The Haunted Hathaways	March 12, 2014	April 21, 2022	
Sam & Cat	March 12, 2014	March 8, 2025	
Nicky, Ricky, Dicky & Dawn	September 18, 2014	August 21, 2020	
Bella and the Bulldogs	January 23, 2015	March 31, 2022	
Make It Pop	March 27, 2015	December 24, 2020	
100 Things to Do Before High School	June 4, 2015	April 26, 2021	
Game Shakers	September 12, 2015	September 7, 2026	
WITS Academy	February 21, 2016	March 13, 2016	
School of Rock	March 12, 2016	December 19, 2018	
The Other Kingdom	April 10, 2016	August 7, 2016	
Legendary Dudas	August 6, 2016	November 23, 2016	
Hunter Street*	March 11, 2017	September 29, 2019	
Knight Squad	February 19, 2018	May 1, 2019	
Star Falls*	March 31, 2018	September 2, 2018	
Cousins for Life	December 1, 2018	June 1, 2019	
Tyler Perry's Young Dylan	March 2, 2020	January 10, 2024	
Danger Force	March 30, 2020	February 14, 2025	
Side Hustle	November 8, 2020	August 21, 2022	
Drama Club	March 21, 2021	July 18, 2021	
The Barbarian and the Troll	April 3, 2021	June 25, 2021	
That Girl Lay Lay	September 24, 2021	April 15, 2023	
Warped!	January 21, 2022	June 11, 2022	
The Really Loud House	November 4, 2022	December 1, 2024	
Erin & Aaron	April 22, 2023	November 10, 2023	

====== Drama ======
Title	Premiere date	End date	Source(s)
Caitlin's Way	December 31, 2007	February 7, 2010	
Are You Afraid of the Dark?	October 26, 2008	August 19, 2022	
House of Anubis*	January 2, 2011	May 5, 2015	
Deadtime Stories	October 26, 2013	October 31, 2015	
I Am Frankie	September 6, 2017	November 25, 2020	
The Astronauts	November 13, 2020	January 15, 2021	

====== Variety ======
Title	Premiere date	Last aired date	Source(s)
The Amanda Show	December 31, 2007	March 17, 2013	
All That	March 12, 2008	January 1, 2022	
Dance on Sunset	April 5, 2008	July 12, 2008	
The HALO Effect	January 23, 2016	October 22, 2016	
The Dude Perfect Show	April 30, 2016	May 1, 2019	
All In with Cam Newton	June 6, 2016	September 16, 2016	
Crashletes	July 9, 2016	May 1, 2019	
Lip Sync Battle Shorties	December 18, 2016	May 1, 2019	
The After Party	September 9, 2017	November 25, 2017	
The Substitute	April 1, 2019	September 21, 2021	
America's Most Musical Family	November 2, 2019	January 22, 2020	
Top Elf	December 1, 2019	December 25, 2020	
Group Chat	May 24, 2020	November 1, 2020	
Unleashed	October 23, 2020	November 10, 2021	

====== Game shows ======
Title	Premiere date	End date	Source(s)
Webheads	June 3, 2014	July 16, 2014	
Rank the Prank	April 1, 2017		
Double Dare	July 7, 2018	December 22, 2019	
Are You Smarter than a 5th Grader?	June 10, 2019	April 5, 2020	
The Crystal Maze	January 24, 2020	April 18, 2020	
Nickelodeon's Unfiltered	July 13, 2020	December 30, 2021	
Tooned In	February 20, 2021	March 6, 2021	

====== News ======
Title	Premiere date	End date	Source(s)
Nick News	October 25, 2010	January 19, 2015	

====== Sports ======
Title	Premiere date	End date	Source(s)
NFL Slimetime	September 15, 2021	January 22, 2026	

===== Animated ("Nicktoons") =====
Title	Premiere date	End date	Source(s)
The Mighty B!	April 27, 2008		
The Penguins of Madagascar	November 30, 2008		
Fanboy & Chum Chum	November 7, 2009		
Winx Club	July 2, 2012	April 14, 2014	
SpongeBob SquarePants	December 25, 2012	August 1, 2024	
The Legend of Korra	October 4, 2014	August 10, 2026	
Harvey Beaks	March 28, 2015	April 2, 2015	
Pig Goat Banana Cricket	July 16, 2015		
Bunsen Is a Beast	February 20, 2017		
The Adventures of Kid Danger	January 15, 2018	September 9, 2018	
Rise of the Teenage Mutant Ninja Turtles	July 20, 2018	March 20, 2019	
The Casagrandes	June 3, 2020		
Monster High	October 6, 2022	March 21, 2025	
The Patrick Star Show	December 17, 2022	August 8, 2024	
Rock Paper Scissors	May 13, 2024	March 14, 2025	
The Fairly OddParents: A New Wish	May 18, 2024	August 8, 2024	
The Fairly OddParents	May 18, 2024	October 18, 2025	
Hey Arnold!	February 10, 2024	October 18, 2025	
Rugrats	September 9, 2025	October 18, 2025	
Wylde Pak	June 21, 2025	January 2, 2026	

==== Programming from Nick at Nite ====
Title	Premiere date	End date	Source(s)
Glenn Martin, DDS	August 22, 2009	September 19, 2009	
See Dad Run	November 26, 2012	October 19, 2013	
Wendell & Vinnie	May 20, 2013	December 1, 2013	
Instant Mom	October 26, 2013	June 5, 2016	

==== Programming from NickMom ====
Title	Premiere date	End date	Source(s)
Parental Discretion with Stefanie Wilder-Taylor	February 5, 2013	March 1, 2013	
NickMom Night Out	February 6, 2013	March 2, 2013	
MFF: Mom Friends Forever	February 7, 2013	February 28, 2013	

==== Programming from Paramount+ ====
Title	Premiere date	End date	Source(s)
Kamp Koral: SpongeBob's Under Years	April 18, 2021	March 21, 2025	
Star Trek: Prodigy	December 20, 2021		
The Fairly OddParents: Fairly Odder	October 10, 2022	January 22, 2023	
Big Nate	March 4, 2023		

==== Programming from MTV ====
Title	Premiere date	End date	Source(s)
The Hills	January 2, 2008	May 31, 2008	
Laguna Beach: The Real Orange County	January 2, 2008	May 31, 2008	
The Paper	April 20, 2008		
The Buried Life	January 23, 2010	January 24, 2010	
My Life as Liz	January 23, 2010	January 24, 2010	
Daria	May 15, 2010	May 16, 2010	
Teen Wolf	August 12, 2011	August 2, 2019	
America's Best Dance Crew	June 1, 2012	July 1, 2012	
The Shannara Chronicles	January 5, 2016		
Promposal	May 22, 2017		
Made	July 15, 2019	July 17, 2019	
My Super Sweet 16	July 15, 2019	August 1, 2019	
Parental Control	July 15, 2019	July 18, 2019	

==== Programming from AwesomenessTV ====
Title	Premiere date	End date	Source(s)
Betch	July 15, 2019	August 9, 2019	
Zac & Mia	July 15, 2019	August 11, 2019	
Love Daily	July 15, 2019	August 2, 2019	
Guidance	July 15, 2019	August 1, 2019	

==== Syndicated programming ====
Title	Premiere date	End date	Source(s)
One on One	December 31, 2007	August 13, 2011	(Note: The show previously aired on The N block and The N channel. It premiered on TeenNick on its launch date, September 28, 2009.)
The Fresh Prince of Bel-Air	December 31, 2007	August 12, 2018	
Sabrina, the Teenage Witch	January 2, 2008	September 27, 2015	
Dawson's Creek	January 2, 2008	December 31, 2008	
Moesha	January 2, 2008	September 11, 2009	
A Different World	January 2, 2008	February 1, 2008	
Growing Pains	January 2, 2008	December 27, 2010	
Clueless	January 2, 2008	September 13, 2009	
Saved by the Bell	January 14, 2008	August 14, 2011	(Note: The show previously aired on The N channel. It premiered on TeenNick on its launch date, September 28, 2009.)
That '70s Show	June 30, 2008	October 20, 2013	
Summerland	2008	April 24, 2009	
What I Like About You	January 1, 2009	May 27, 2013	
Full House	August 31, 2009	November 12, 2017	
Malcolm in the Middle	November 26, 2010	April 6, 2014	
Buffy the Vampire Slayer	May 31, 2011	October 8, 2011	
Freaks and Geeks	June 13, 2011	October 8, 2011	
Undeclared	June 13, 2011	October 9, 2011	
Everybody Hates Chris	July 18, 2011	December 28, 2012	
The Facts of Life	March 12, 2012	April 2, 2012	
Friday Night Lights	April 10, 2015	September 25, 2015	
So Little Time	September 5, 2015	September 7, 2015	
Boy Meets World	April 18, 2016	May 13, 2018	
The Ed Bassmaster Show	April 30, 2016	May 7, 2016	
America's Funniest Home Videos	September 12, 2022	December 8, 2023	
Wipeout	February 20, 2023	April 24, 2023	

==== Acquired programming ====
===== Live-action =====
Title	Premiere date	End date	Source(s)
Instant Star*	December 31, 2007	December 28, 2008	
Degrassi*	December 31, 2007	September 27, 2015	
About a Girl*	December 31, 2007	August 19, 2008	
Radio Free Roscoe	January 2, 2008	September 8, 2013	
The Best Years*	2008	June 26, 2011	
Whistler	2008	December 7, 2008	
The Assistants	July 10, 2009	October 7, 2010	
Dance Academy	February 20, 2012	July 20, 2014	
Alien Surf Girls	May 29, 2012	June 22, 2014	
Breaking from Above	June 25, 2012	June 30, 2012	
SLiDE	August 16, 2012	October 13, 2012	
Life with Boys	December 28, 2012	February 3, 2017	
Open Heart	January 20, 2015	May 1, 2015	
Mission: 4Count	July 6, 2015	July 11, 2015	
Soccer Superstar	July 11, 2015	July 31, 2016	

==== Acquired programming from Nickelodeon ====
===== Live-action =====
Title	Premiere date	End date	Source(s)
H_{2}O: Just Add Water*	March 16, 2008	November 14, 2014	
Rank the Prank	April 1, 2017		
The Bureau of Magical Things	October 9, 2018	November 9, 2018	
Power Rangers Beast Morphers	November 14, 2019	May 1, 2020	

===== Animated =====
Title	Premiere date	End date	Source(s)
Miraculous: Tales of Ladybug & Cat Noir	January 9, 2016	March 26, 2016	
Mysticons	January 14, 2018	June 1, 2018	
The Smurfs	February 17, 2025	March 21, 2025	

==== Specials ====
Title	Year(s) aired
It Goes There: Degrassi's Most Talked About Moments	2015
Movie Maynia	2008–09
Movie 'Splosion	2010
Style High	2008
TeenNick Rocks Out	2011
The Wonder Girls	2012

=== NickRewind ===
==== Original programming ====
Title	Premiere date	End date	Source(s)
U Pick with Stick	October 7, 2011	March 2012	

==== Programming from Nickelodeon ====
===== Live-action =====
Title	Premiere date	End date	Source(s)
All That	July 25, 2011	January 29, 2020	
Kenan & Kel	July 25, 2011	March 11, 2021	
Clarissa Explains It All	July 25, 2011	April 15, 2020	
Legends of the Hidden Temple	October 7, 2011	May 21, 2016	
Salute Your Shorts	October 7, 2011	July 10, 2016	
Hey Dude	October 8, 2011	July 10, 2016	
Double Dare	October 14, 2011	September 30, 2018	
Space Cases	October 14, 2011	January 1, 2016	
Are You Afraid of the Dark?	October 28, 2011	October 10, 2021	
The Secret World of Alex Mack	December 28, 2011	June 24, 2015	
The Mystery Files of Shelby Woo	December 28, 2011	March 20, 2016	
The Journey of Allen Strange	December 29, 2011	December 19, 2015	
Figure It Out	August 3, 2012	May 22, 2016	
Global Guts	August 5, 2013		
My Brother and Me	December 23, 2013	December 31, 2015	
The Adventures of Pete & Pete	December 23, 2013	August 5, 2017	
Weinerville	April 2, 2015	October 10, 2015	
Welcome Freshmen	October 6, 2015	May 22, 2016	
Roundhouse	October 10, 2015	August 15, 2017	
GUTS	October 11, 2015	June 11, 2016	
The Amanda Show	June 10, 2016	April 16, 2020	
Nick News with Linda Ellerbee	November 5, 2016	November 6, 2016	
Zoey 101	March 23, 2020	April 19, 2020	
Drake & Josh	March 25, 2020	May 1, 2020	
Unleashed	November 2, 2020		
iCarly	December 20, 2021	January 31, 2022	

===== Animated ("Nicktoons") =====
Title	First aired	Last aired	Source(s)
Doug	July 25, 2011	December 17, 2021	
Hey Arnold!	September 5, 2011	January 17, 2022	
Rocko's Modern Life	September 5, 2011	December 17, 2021	
The Angry Beavers	October 7, 2011	December 6, 2021	
Rugrats	October 7, 2011	January 10, 2022	
Rocket Power	October 14, 2011	November 22, 2021	
Aaahh!!! Real Monsters	October 29, 2011	October 17, 2021	
The Wild Thornberrys	November 4, 2011	November 1, 2021	
The Ren & Stimpy Show	December 26, 2011	September 5, 2021	
CatDog	March 23, 2013	November 15, 2021	
As Told by Ginger	October 9, 2015	March 1, 2021	
All Grown Up!	October 11, 2015	December 20, 2021	
KaBlam!	October 8, 2016	August 19, 2017	
ChalkZone	November 12, 2016	February 28, 2021	
Action League Now!	November 19, 2016	November 20, 2016	
Oh Yeah! Cartoons	December 3, 2016	December 4, 2016	
Invader Zim	January 2, 2019	December 24, 2020	
The Adventures of Jimmy Neutron, Boy Genius	January 9, 2019	July 26, 2020	
Danny Phantom	January 16, 2019	November 8, 2021	
Back at the Barnyard	January 23, 2019		
The Mighty B!	March 1, 2021	December 13, 2021	
El Tigre: The Adventures of Manny Rivera	March 20, 2021	April 16, 2021	
My Life as a Teenage Robot	March 27, 2021	September 20, 2021	

==== Acquired programming ====
Title	Premiere date	End date	Source(s)
Mighty Morphin Power Rangers	November 8, 2013	November 10, 2013	
You Can't Do That on Television	October 5, 2015	December 20, 2015	

==== Online programming ====
Title	Release date(s)	Source(s)
NSFW: Nick Shows were Freakin' Weird	2017–19	
Where Were the Parents?	2018	

== See also ==
- List of programs broadcast by Noggin
- List of programs broadcast by Nickelodeon
- List of programs broadcast by Nick at Nite
- List of programs broadcast by the Nick Jr. Channel
- List of programs broadcast by Nicktoons
- List of Nickelodeon original films
- TeenNick
