= List of programs broadcast by Nicktoons =

This is a list of television programs currently and formerly broadcast by the children's cable television channel Nicktoons, a sister channel to Nickelodeon in the United States.

== Current programming ==
=== Programming from Nickelodeon ===
==== Animated ====
| Title | Premiere date | Source(s) |
|---|---|---|
| SpongeBob SquarePants* | May 1, 2002 | |
| Teenage Mutant Ninja Turtles* (2012) | September 30, 2012 | (Note: Nickelodeon acquired the Teenage Mutant Ninja Turtles franchise in 2009. Paramount owns the copyright to both the 2012 series and Rise of the Teenage Mutant Ninja Turtles.) (Note: Ended but still airing reruns.) |
| The Loud House* | May 2, 2016 | |
| The Patrick Star Show | July 11, 2021 | |
| Rock Paper Scissors | February 7, 2024 | |
| Wylde Pak | June 6, 2025 | |

=== Acquired programming ===
==== Animated ====
| Title | Premiere date | Source(s) |
|---|---|---|
| Sonic Prime | September 13, 2025 | |
| The Boss Baby: Back in Business | October 5, 2025 | |

=== Programming from Paramount+ ===
| Title | Premiere date | Source(s) |
|---|---|---|
| Tales of the Teenage Mutant Ninja Turtles* | February 17, 2025 | |

== Former programming ==
=== Original programming ===
| Title | Premiere date | End date | Source(s) |
|---|---|---|---|
| Nicktoons Film Festival | October 24, 2004 | November 20, 2009 | |
| Shorts in a Bunch | September 23, 2007 | December 30, 2007 | |
| Making Fiends | October 4, 2008 | October 31, 2016 | |
| Random! Cartoons | December 6, 2008 | July 5, 2014 | |
| Ape Escape | July 5, 2009 | September 6, 2009 | |

=== Programming from Nickelodeon ===
An asterisk (*) indicates that the program had new episodes aired on Nicktoons.

==== Animated ("Nicktoons") ====
| Title | Premiere date | End date | Source(s) |
|---|---|---|---|
| Doug | May 1, 2002 | December 17, 2020 | |
| Rugrats | May 1, 2002 | December 25, 2022 | |
| The Ren & Stimpy Show | May 1, 2002 | August 27, 2011 | |
| Rocko's Modern Life | May 1, 2002 | August 24, 2011 | |
| CatDog* | May 1, 2002 | August 23, 2011 | |
| Aaahh!!! Real Monsters | May 1, 2002 | November 26, 2007 | |
| Hey Arnold! | May 1, 2002 | February 11, 2024 | (Note: Despite regular reruns of Hey Arnold! ending in 2009, both movies based on the series have aired on Nicktoons as recent as September 20, 2020) |
| KaBlam! | May 1, 2002 | December 17, 2007 | |
| The Angry Beavers* | May 1, 2002 | February 12, 2008 | |
| Oh Yeah! Cartoons | May 1, 2002 | September 3, 2007 | (Note: Despite Oh Yeah! Cartoons not airing in its original form on Nicktoons since 2007, Fairly OddParents shorts from the series were shown in the rotation of that segment's spin-off series as recent as November 26, 2019) |
| The Wild Thornberrys | May 1, 2002 | January 21, 2008 | |
| Rocket Power | May 1, 2002 | June 19, 2010 | |
| As Told by Ginger* | May 1, 2002 | January 3, 2009 | |
| Action League Now! | May 1, 2002 | December 31, 2010 | |
| ChalkZone | May 1, 2002 | October 28, 2013 | |
| The Fairly OddParents* | May 1, 2002 | February 24, 2023 | |
| Invader Zim* | May 1, 2002 | February 23, 2021 | |
| The Adventures of Jimmy Neutron, Boy Genius | January 12, 2003 | October 2, 2021 | |
| All Grown Up! | December 25, 2005 | October 28, 2013 | |
| Avatar: The Last Airbender | March 13, 2006 | March 24, 2024 | |
| My Life as a Teenage Robot* | April 1, 2006 | May 16, 2016 | |
| The X's | April 3, 2006 | December 20, 2015 | |
| El Tigre: The Adventures of Manny Rivera* | March 3, 2007 | May 5, 2021 | |
| Danny Phantom | June 1, 2007 | March 31, 2021 | |
| Tak and the Power of Juju | September 1, 2007 | September 3, 2012 | |
| Back at the Barnyard* | September 30, 2007 | February 5, 2021 | |
| Catscratch | November 25, 2007 | December 19, 2015 | |
| The Mighty B!* | April 28, 2008 | February 14, 2016 | |
| The Penguins of Madagascar* | November 29, 2008 | October 2, 2016 | (Note: Co-produced by Nickelodeon Animation Studio and DreamWorks Animation. DreamWorks owns the characters and other elements in the show while Nickelodeon retains half of the show's copyright.) |
| Fanboy & Chum Chum* | October 23, 2009 | December 25, 2016 | |
| Planet Sheen* | October 2, 2010 | May 5, 2015 | |
| T.U.F.F. Puppy* | October 2, 2010 | February 5, 2021 | |
| Kung Fu Panda: Legends of Awesomeness* | November 4, 2011 | July 9, 2018 | |
| Winx Club | September 25, 2011 | | (Note: Nickelodeon Animation Studio produced the Winx Club revival series, made up of seasons 5 through 7, in co-development with Rainbow. Viacom co-owns the copyright to these seasons and, until 2023, co-owned the Rainbow studio itself.) |
| The Legend of Korra | April 22, 2012 | March 13, 2020 | |
| Robot and Monster* | August 9, 2012 | May 3, 2015 | |
| Sanjay and Craig | May 25, 2013 | March 31, 2022 | |
| Monsters vs. Aliens | October 28, 2013 | November 8, 2016 | |
| Breadwinners* | February 21, 2014 | July 4, 2021 | |
| Harvey Beaks* | March 28, 2015 | June 21, 2019 | |
| Pig Goat Banana Cricket* | July 16, 2015 | August 11, 2018 | |
| Bunsen Is a Beast* | February 20, 2017 | December 25, 2018 | |
| Welcome to the Wayne* | July 31, 2017 | June 21, 2019 | |
| The Adventures of Kid Danger | January 15, 2018 | October 23, 2021 | |
| Rise of the Teenage Mutant Ninja Turtles* | July 20, 2018 | August 7, 2022 | |
| Middle School Moguls | September 12, 2019 | October 3, 2019 | |
| The Casagrandes | October 19, 2019 | March 21, 2024 | |
| It's Pony* | January 18, 2020 | September 9, 2022 | |
| Middlemost Post | July 11, 2021 | May 19, 2022 | |
| Monster High | October 6, 2022 | March 23, 2024 | |
| The Fairly OddParents: A New Wish | May 20, 2024 | May 30, 2024 | |
| Max & the Midknights* | November 2, 2024 | September 9, 2025 | |

==== Puppetry ====
| Title | Premiere date | End date | Source(s) |
|---|---|---|---|
| Mr. Meaty* | March 10, 2007 | January 4, 2010 | |
| The Barbarian and the Troll | April 3, 2021 | July 2, 2021 | |

==== Live-action ====
| Title | Premiere date | End date | Source(s) |
|---|---|---|---|
| The Troop* | September 26, 2009 | April 24, 2015 | |
| Big Time Rush | January 11, 2010 | October 14, 2010 | (Note: Despite regular reruns of Big Time Rush ending in 2010, a movie based on the series have aired on Nicktoons as recent as December 26, 2012) |
| iCarly | June 27, 2010 | | |
| True Jackson, VP | June 27, 2010 | | |
| Victorious | June 27, 2010 | | |
| Supah Ninjas | February 5, 2011 | April 24, 2015 | |
| Drake & Josh | March 7, 2011 | February 14, 2016 | (Note: Despite regular reruns of Drake & Josh ending in 2016, a movie based on the series have aired on Nicktoons as recent as December 20, 2020) |
| Ned's Declassified School Survival Guide | March 7, 2011 | August 5, 2011 | |
| Bucket & Skinner's Epic Adventures | July 19, 2011 | June 29, 2012 | |
| The Thundermans | November 1, 2013 | June 3, 2021 | |
| You Gotta See This* | April 1, 2014 | | |
| Henry Danger | September 19, 2014 | July 17, 2021 | |
| Nicky, Ricky, Dicky & Dawn | September 19, 2014 | August 10, 2018 | |
| Max & Shred* | October 13, 2014 | May 13, 2016 | |
| Bella and the Bulldogs | January 21, 2015 | September 22, 2017 | |
| The Haunted Hathaways | May 6, 2015 | August 25, 2017 | |
| 100 Things to Do Before High School | June 1, 2015 | September 3, 2017 | |
| Game Shakers | September 12, 2015 | April 8, 2018 | |
| The HALO Effect | January 21, 2016 | October 17, 2016 | |
| School of Rock | March 12, 2016 | April 8, 2018 | |
| The Other Kingdom | April 10, 2016 | | |
| The Dude Perfect Show | April 22, 2016 | January 9, 2021 | |
| All In with Cam Newton | June 10, 2016 | September 9, 2017 | |
| Crashletes | July 8, 2016 | April 17, 2020 | |
| Jagger Eaton's Mega Life | October 7, 2016 | November 3, 2017 | |
| Lip Sync Battle Shorties | December 23, 2016 | March 9, 2018 | |
| Hunter Street | March 11, 2017 | March 14, 2017 | |
| Knight Squad | February 19, 2018 | June 22, 2018 | |
| Star Falls | March 31, 2018 | April 28, 2018 | |
| Cousins for Life | December 7, 2018 | December 16, 2018 | |
| The Substitute | April 1, 2019 | March 21, 2021 | |
| All That | June 15, 2019 | December 18, 2020 | |
| America's Most Musical Family | November 1, 2019 | November 16, 2019 | |
| Tyler Perry's Young Dylan | March 4, 2020 | January 10, 2024 | |
| Danger Force | March 31, 2020 | July 11, 2022 | |
| Group Chat | May 23, 2020 | October 25, 2020 | |
| Unleashed | October 23, 2020 | December 20, 2020 | |
| Side Hustle | November 8, 2020 | July 4, 2022 | |
| The Astronauts | November 13, 2020 | January 15, 2021 | |
| Are You Afraid of the Dark? (2019) | October 23, 2020 | March 21, 2021 | |
| Drama Club | March 21, 2021 | May 23, 2021 | |
| NFL Slimetime | September 15, 2021 | February 18, 2024 | |
| Warped! | January 21, 2022 | April 3, 2022 | |
| The Really Loud House | November 5, 2022 | May 12, 2024 | |
| That Girl Lay Lay | December 20, 2023 | March 20, 2024 | |

==== Game shows ====
| Title | Premiere date | End date | Source(s) |
|---|---|---|---|
| BrainSurge* | August 2, 2010 | August 1, 2014 | |
| Webheads | September 12, 2015 | October 9, 2015 | |
| Figure It Out | September 14, 2015 | September 22, 2015 | |
| Paradise Run | April 8, 2016 | May 12, 2020 | |
| Keep It Spotless | March 30, 2018 | April 19, 2020 | |
| Double Dare | July 8, 2018 | April 10, 2020 | |
| Are You Smarter than a 5th Grader? | September 6, 2019 | May 29, 2020 | |
| The Crystal Maze | January 24, 2020 | April 10, 2020 | |
| Nickelodeon's Unfiltered | July 12, 2020 | May 30, 2021 | |
| Tooned In | February 8, 2021 | May 22, 2022 | |

==== Preschool ====
| Title | Premiere date | End date | Source(s) |
|---|---|---|---|
| Blaze and the Monster Machines | February 13, 2022 | | |
| The Tiny Chef Show | February 3, 2023 | May 9, 2024 | |
| Super Duper Bunny League | April 19, 2025 | May 24, 2025 | |

=== Programming from Nick at Nite ===
| Title | Premiere date | End date | Source(s) |
|---|---|---|---|
| Glenn Martin, DDS | August 22, 2009 | October 10, 2011 | |

=== Programming from Paramount+ ===
| Title | Premiere date | End date | Source(s) |
|---|---|---|---|
| Kamp Koral: SpongeBob's Under Years | April 17, 2021 | April 25, 2025 | |
| Rugrats* (2021) | December 19, 2021 | March 22, 2024 | |
| Star Trek: Prodigy | December 19, 2021 | February 16, 2023 | |
| The Fairly OddParents: Fairly Odder | April 23, 2022 | December 11, 2022 | |
| Big Nate | September 6, 2022 | March 22, 2024 | |
| Transformers: EarthSpark | November 11, 2022 | April 11, 2026 | |

=== Programming from Warner Bros. Animation ===
| Title | Premiere date | End date | Source(s) |
|---|---|---|---|
| Animaniacs | May 1, 2002 | August 26, 2005 | |
| Pinky and the Brain | May 1, 2002 | September 5, 2004 | |
| Tiny Toon Adventures | April 5, 2004 | August 26, 2005 | |

=== Acquired programming ===
Viacom licensed much of Nicktoons' programming from unrelated companies in temporary broadcast deals. Exceptions included 4Kids' Teenage Mutant Ninja Turtles series (which Viacom purchased along with the rights to the TMNT franchise)

==== Anime ====
| Title | Premiere date | End date | Source(s) |
|---|---|---|---|
| Domo TV | October 2008 | February 2009 | |
| Dragon Ball Z Kai | May 24, 2010 | April 14, 2013 | |
| Dragon Ball GT | January 16, 2012 | December 11, 2014 | |
| Monsuno | February 23, 2012 | April 27, 2014 | |
| Yu-Gi-Oh! | March 11, 2013 | March 8, 2014 | |
| Yu-Gi-Oh! Zexal | April 12, 2013 | November 6, 2015 | |
| Digimon | June 10, 2013 | January 25, 2014 | |
| LBX: Little Battlers Experience | August 24, 2014 | September 25, 2016 | |
| Yu-Gi-Oh! Arc-V | February 21, 2016 | January 12, 2019 | |

==== Animated ====
| Title | Premiere date | End date | Source(s) |
|---|---|---|---|
| Corneil & Bernie | February 21, 2004 | October 17, 2008 | |
| Kaput & Zösky | March 7, 2004 | January 1, 2007 | |
| Skyland* | November 18, 2006 | June 2, 2008 | (Note: Nickelodeon is named in the credits, but Nickelodeon's studios did not produce the show.) |
| The Secret Show | January 20, 2007 | November 29, 2010 | |
| Edgar & Ellen* | October 7, 2007 | April 5, 2010 | |
| Ricky Sprocket: Showbiz Boy* | January 21, 2008 | March 31, 2012 | |
| Speed Racer: The Next Generation* | May 2, 2008 | August 25, 2013 | |
| Three Delivery* | June 27, 2008 | June 6, 2012 | |
| Wolverine and the X-Men* | January 23, 2009 | January 14, 2013 | |
| Iron Man: Armored Adventures* | April 24, 2009 | May 3, 2015 | |
| Fantastic Four: World's Greatest Heroes* | August 14, 2009 | May 20, 2012 | |
| NFL Rush Zone* | September 6, 2010 | July 8, 2015 | |
| Hero Factory* | August 19, 2010 | December 6, 2014 | |
| Zevo-3* | August 22, 2010 | October 10, 2011 | |
| Voltron Force* | June 16, 2011 | May 3, 2015 | |
| Wild Grinders* | April 27, 2012 | April 23, 2016 | |
| Huntik: Secrets & Seekers* | August 6, 2012 | June 30, 2013 | |
| Teenage Mutant Ninja Turtles (2003) | December 22, 2014 | February 13, 2016 | |
| Get Blake!* | April 20, 2016 | December 18, 2016 | |
| Teenage Mutant Ninja Turtles (1987) | August 1, 2023 | September 8, 2023 | |
| The Twisted Timeline of Sammy & Raj* | January 15, 2024 | March 14, 2024 | |
| Zokie of Planet Ruby* | May 10, 2025 | November 2, 2025 | |

==== Live-action ====
| Title | Premiere date | End date | Source(s) |
|---|---|---|---|
| Power Rangers Jungle Fury | November 18, 2011 | April 13, 2017 | |
| Power Rangers Dino Thunder | January 6, 2012 | November 24, 2014 | |
| Power Rangers Ninja Storm | June 1, 2012 | November 24, 2014 | |
| Power Rangers Time Force | August 17, 2012 | April 18, 2017 | |
| Power Rangers S.P.D. | November 11, 2012 | November 24, 2014 | |
| Alien Dawn* | February 22, 2013 | April 12, 2013 | |
| Power Rangers in Space | February 25, 2013 | September 30, 2013 | |
| Power Rangers Turbo | February 25, 2013 | November 24, 2014 | |
| Power Rangers Wild Force | February 25, 2013 | October 2, 2013 | |
| Power Rangers Lightspeed Rescue | February 26, 2013 | October 1, 2013 | |
| Power Rangers RPM | February 27, 2013 | | |
| Mighty Morphin Power Rangers | February 28, 2013 | | |
| Power Rangers Zeo | September 30, 2013 | | |
| Power Rangers Operation Overdrive | October 3, 2013 | | |
| Game Changers with Kevin Frazier* | April 8, 2015 | April 15, 2016 | |

=== Acquired programming from Nickelodeon ===
==== Animated ====
| Title | Premiere date | End date | Source(s) |
|---|---|---|---|
| Butt-Ugly Martians | May 1, 2002 | October 5, 2004 | |
| Pelswick | May 1, 2002 | May 30, 2005 | |
| The Charlie Brown and Snoopy Show | December 31, 2003 | May 2, 2004 | |
| Yakkity Yak | May 22, 2004 | September 23, 2007 | |
| Martin Mystery | May 16, 2005 | May 2, 2008 | |
| My Dad the Rock Star | September 4, 2005 | January 31, 2008 | |
| 6teen | December 20, 2005 | July 2, 2006 | |
| Kappa Mikey* | February 25, 2006 | November 29, 2010 | |
| Shuriken School | September 8, 2006 | June 2, 2008 | |
| Wayside | September 1, 2007 | April 5, 2010 | |
| Rocket Monkeys | April 19, 2013 | May 2, 2014 | |
| Rabbids Invasion* | September 1, 2013 | June 30, 2017 | |
| Digimon Fusion | October 13, 2013 | September 25, 2016 | |
| Oggy and the Cockroaches | April 6, 2015 | May 5, 2015 | |
| Alvinnn!!! and the Chipmunks* | December 21, 2015 | June 29, 2023 | |
| Miraculous: Tales of Ladybug & Cat Noir | January 3, 2016 | January 29, 2017 | |
| Mysticons* | August 30, 2017 | September 15, 2018 | |
| Rainbow Butterfly Unicorn Kitty* | January 27, 2019 | December 19, 2019 | |
| 44 Cats | June 14, 2019 | February 25, 2020 | |
| Lego City Adventures | June 23, 2019 | August 1, 2021 | |
| Lego Jurassic World: Legend of Isla Nublar | September 14, 2019 | August 30, 2020 | |
| Ollie's Pack* | April 6, 2020 | May 6, 2021 | |
| The Smurfs | September 6, 2021 | May 17, 2025 | |

==== Live-action ====
| Title | Premiere date | End date | Source(s) |
|---|---|---|---|
| Are You Afraid of the Dark? | October 20, 2008 | October 31, 2008 | |
| Power Rangers Samurai | February 7, 2011 | March 17, 2020 | |
| Power Rangers Megaforce | February 2, 2013 | January 14, 2020 | |
| Power Rangers Dino Charge | February 7, 2015 | March 12, 2021 | |
| Power Rangers Ninja Steel | January 21, 2017 | March 10, 2020 | |
| Rank the Prank | February 14, 2017 | April 1, 2017 | |
| Power Rangers Beast Morphers | March 2, 2019 | February 13, 2021 | |
| Power Rangers Dino Fury | February 21, 2021 | December 18, 2021 | |

== See also ==
- List of programs broadcast by Nickelodeon
- List of programs broadcast by Nick at Nite
- List of programs broadcast by the Nick Jr. Channel
- List of programs broadcast by TeenNick
- List of Nickelodeon original films
- List of Nickelodeon short films
- Nicktoons
