= List of programs broadcast by Boomerang =

Boomerang is an American pay television channel owned by Skydance Corporation. This article list television programs currently and formerly broadcast on the network.

== Current programming ==
This section lists programs currently airing on Boomerang's schedule as of October 2026. A few of the programs are being run concurrently with Cartoon Network.

An asterisk (*) indicates that the program is also airing on MeTV Toons.
Two asterisks (**) indicate that the program is also airing on Discovery Family.
Three asterisks (***) indicates that the program is on both MeTV Toons and Discovery Family.

=== Original programming ===
Title	Premiere date	Source(s)
The Tom and Jerry Show (2014) (Note: Ended but still airing reruns.)	January 5, 2015	(Note: The Tom and Jerry Show (2014) originally aired new episodes on Cartoon Network from April 9, 2014 to March 12, 2016.)
New Looney Tunes	October 5, 2015	(Note: New Looney Tunes, formerly known as Wabbit, originally aired new episodes on Cartoon Network from September 21, 2015 to March 12, 2016.)
Be Cool, Scooby-Doo!	October 5, 2015	(Note: Be Cool, Scooby-Doo! originally aired new episodes on Cartoon Network from October 5, 2015 to March 12, 2016.)
Scooby-Doo and Guess Who?	October 1, 2020	(Note: Scooby-Doo and Guess Who? was first released on Boomerang's SVOD subscription service on June 28, 2019, and premiered on Cartoon Network on July 8, 2019.)

=== Repeats of ended programming ===
Title	Premiere date	Source(s)
The Flintstones*	April 1, 2000	
Jabberjaw	April 1, 2000	
The Jetsons*	April 1, 2000	
Jonny Quest*	April 1, 2000	
Looney Tunes***	April 1, 2000	
Merrie Melodies***	April 1, 2000	
The New Scooby and Scrappy-Doo Show	April 1, 2000	
The New Scooby-Doo Movies*	April 1, 2000	
The New Scooby-Doo Mysteries	April 1, 2000	
The Pebbles and Bamm-Bamm Show	April 1, 2000	
Popeye*	April 1, 2000	
Scooby-Doo and Scrappy-Doo (1979)	April 1, 2000	
Scooby-Doo and Scrappy-Doo* (1980)	April 1, 2000	
The Scooby-Doo Show*	April 1, 2000	(Note: The Scooby-Doo Show was a standalone program that was originally part of Laff-A-Lympics. It was later shown on Boomerang as part of that show, as well as the third season of Scooby-Doo, Where Are You!)
Scooby-Doo, Where Are You!*	April 1, 2000	
The Smurfs***	April 1, 2000	
Thundarr the Barbarian	April 1, 2000	
Tom and Jerry*	April 1, 2000	
The Yogi Bear Show*	April 1, 2000	
A Pup Named Scooby-Doo	October 3, 2003	
Baby Looney Tunes***	July 4, 2005	
Tom & Jerry Kids	August 29, 2005	
Duck Dodgers*	September 16, 2005	
What's New, Scooby-Doo?	January 9, 2006	
Ben 10 (2005)	December 6, 2010	
Foster's Home for Imaginary Friends	August 11, 2012	
The Looney Tunes Show	April 7, 2014	
Chowder	June 2, 2014	
Scooby-Doo! Mystery Incorporated*	June 2, 2014	
Codename: Kids Next Door	December 20, 2014	
Tom and Jerry Tales	May 23, 2015	
The Sylvester and Tweety Mysteries**	July 13, 2015	
Taz-Mania	July 15, 2023	
The New Yogi Bear Show	March 10, 2025	

== Former programming ==
This section lists shows that formerly aired on Boomerang. It does not include specials that often aired as part of a programming block.

An asterisk (*) indicate that the program currently airs on MeTV Toons.
Two asterisks (**) indicate that the program currently airs on Discovery Family.

=== Original programming ===
Title	Premiere date	End date	Source(s)
Bunnicula	February 6, 2016	January 3, 2021	(Note: Bunnicula originally aired new episodes simultaneously on Cartoon Network and Boomerang from February 6 to March 12, 2016.)
Wacky Races (2017)	February 22, 2018	January 24, 2024	(Note: Wacky Races (2017) was first released on Boomerang's SVOD subscription service on August 14, 2017.)
Dorothy and the Wizard of Oz	May 21, 2018	July 31, 2022	(Note: Dorothy and the Wizard of Oz was first released on Boomerang's SVOD subscription service on June 29, 2017.)

=== Acquired programming ===
==== Animated ====
Title	Premiere date	End date	Source(s)
Dudley Do-Right	July 1, 2002	August 8, 2006	
Tennessee Tuxedo and His Tales	July 1, 2002	May 27, 2007	
Underdog*	July 1, 2002	May 27, 2007	
The Rocky and Bullwinkle Show	July 1, 2002	September 29, 2013	
Casper and Friends*	August 8, 2003	October 31, 2013	
G.I. Joe: A Real American Hero	February 1, 2004	February 2, 2004	
Battle of the Planets	April 17, 2004	June 27, 2004	
The Mr. Magoo Show*	July 13, 2004	August 8, 2006	
The Pink Panther Show	July 4, 2005	March 11, 2012	
Batfink	September 16, 2006	December 30, 2007	
Garfield and Friends	September 18, 2006	August 30, 2021	(Note: The program's original run on the network was syndicated through The Program Exchange. Garfield and Friends was first released on Boomerang's SVOD subscription service on November 1, 2018, in remastered form.)
Dennis the Menace	January 15, 2007	August 1, 2010	
Voltron: Defender of the Universe	February 18, 2008	January 30, 2009	
ThunderCats	July 18, 2011	September 2, 2011	
The Addams Family (1964)	October 3, 2011	October 31, 2013	
The Munsters	October 3, 2011	October 31, 2013	
Puppy in My Pocket: Adventures in Pocketville	January 2, 2012	December 31, 2012	
Numb Chucks	January 10, 2015	July 12, 2015	
Shaun the Sheep	October 7, 2015	June 30, 2017	
Peanuts	May 9, 2016	June 3, 2018	
Grizzy & the Lemmings	April 10, 2017	May 24, 2019	
Monchhichi Tribe	January 3, 2019	January 24, 2020	
Toad and Friends	January 6, 2025	February 24, 2025	

==== Preschool ====
Title	Premiere date	End date	Source(s)
Peppa Pig	November 23, 2005		(Note: Peppa Pig aired during Tickle-U, a programming block aimed at a preschool audience, that was broadcast simultaneously on Cartoon Network for cross-promotional purposes.)

=== Programming from Cartoon Network/Kids' WB ===
==== Cartoon Network Studios ====
Title	Premiere date	End date	Source(s)
Dexter's Laboratory	January 16, 2006	June 7, 2021	
Mike, Lu & Og	June 5, 2006	March 31, 2011	
Cow and Chicken/I Am Weasel	April 1, 2007	April 4, 2023	
What a Cartoon!	June 2, 2007	September 2, 2007	
Johnny Bravo	January 21, 2008	June 9, 2018	
The Powerpuff Girls (1998)	December 1, 2008	February 28, 2025	
Samurai Jack (Note: Seasons 1 and 2 only)	August 3, 2009	June 2, 2014	
Courage the Cowardly Dog	October 19, 2009	June 7, 2021	
The Secret Saturdays	December 6, 2011	June 2, 2014	
Ben 10: Omniverse	November 3, 2012	June 1, 2014	(Note: Select episodes of Ben 10: Omniverse aired on Boomerang before they aired on Cartoon Network. However, in the case of the episode "Catfight", Boomerang aired it the day after Cartoon Network's broadcast (April 18 and April 19, 2014).)
The Grim Adventures of Billy & Mandy	October 7, 2013	June 7, 2021	
Camp Lazlo	January 6, 2014	February 15, 2024	
Ed, Edd n Eddy	March 3, 2014	October 1, 2020	
The Marvelous Misadventures of Flapjack	December 21, 2014	January 31, 2025	
Evil Con Carne	July 29, 2016		
The Powerpuff Girls (2016)	November 1, 2016	February 20, 2024	
Uncle Grandpa	June 5, 2017	January 3, 2021	
OK K.O.! Let's Be Heroes	August 7, 2017	September 1, 2017	(Note: OK K.O.! Let's Be Heroes aired on Boomerang exclusively for a month to promote the show's airings on Cartoon Network.)
Ben 10 (2016)	November 6, 2017	April 26, 2020	
Regular Show	May 28, 2018	August 21, 2022	
Mighty Magiswords	May 29, 2018	May 24, 2019	
Adventure Time	June 2, 2018	May 29, 2024	
Steven Universe**	June 2, 2018	May 29, 2024	
Summer Camp Island**	July 7, 2018	July 9, 2018	(Note: Summer Camp Island aired on Boomerang exclusively for a weekend marathon to promote the show's airings on Cartoon Network, with new episodes of the series being simulcast on both networks that weekend.)
Clarence	September 7, 2020	November 1, 2020	
Craig of the Creek	May 2, 2022	April 4, 2023	
Ben 10: Alien Force	August 7, 2022	February 11, 2024	
We Bare Bears	April 4, 2023	February 15, 2024	
We Baby Bears	February 11, 2024		

==== Warner Bros. Animation ====
Title	Premiere date	End date	Source(s)
The Bugs Bunny Show	April 1, 2002	May 6, 2007	
Porky Pig and Friends	June 11, 2002	May 6, 2007	
Bugs Bunny/Road Runner Hour	July 11, 2004	May 6, 2007	
The Sylvester & Tweety Show	July 11, 2004	May 6, 2007	
The Bugs and Daffy Show	July 4, 2005	May 6, 2007	
The Porky Pig Show	July 4, 2005	May 6, 2007	
Batman: The Animated Series	July 4, 2005	January 5, 2007	
Superman: The Animated Series	July 4, 2005	January 5, 2007	
Justice League	April 23, 2006	June 1, 2007	
Justice League Unlimited	June 2, 2007	May 30, 2010	
The Batman	October 15, 2007	March 31, 2011	
Teen Titans	February 2, 2009	June 1, 2014	
Young Justice	November 3, 2012	December 30, 2012	
Johnny Test	April 2, 2013	June 26, 2016	(Note: During its 2013 run on the network, select episodes of Johnny Test aired on Boomerang before they aired on Cartoon Network.)
Teen Titans Go!	December 1, 2014	May 29, 2024	
DC Super Hero Girls	July 1, 2019	July 31, 2022	
Shaggy and Scooby-Doo Get a Clue!	September 30, 2024	October 30, 2024	

==== Hanna-Barbera Cartoons/Turner Entertainment ====
Title	Premiere date	End date	Source(s)
Atom Ant*	April 1, 2000	September 5, 2011	
Augie Doggie and Doggie Daddy	April 1, 2000	December 25, 2013	
The Huckleberry Hound Show*	April 1, 2000	November 29, 2020	
Josie and the Pussycats*	April 1, 2000	November 29, 2020	
Laff-A-Lympics	April 1, 2000	April 22, 2024	
The Magilla Gorilla Show*	April 1, 2000	November 29, 2020	
MGM Cartoons*	April 1, 2000	May 31, 2014	
Pixie and Dixie and Mr. Jinks*	April 1, 2000	May 31, 2014	
The Quick Draw McGraw Show	April 1, 2000	November 22, 2012	
Secret Squirrel*	April 1, 2000	March 2, 2014	
The Smurfs*	April 1, 2000	March 31, 2024	
Snagglepuss*	April 1, 2000	October 3, 2011	
Space Ghost and Dino Boy	April 1, 2000	March 27, 2011	
Top Cat*	April 1, 2000	April 22, 2024	
Yo Yogi!*	April 1, 2000	June 28, 2024	
Hokey Wolf*	April 1, 2000	October 3, 2011	
Lippy the Lion and Hardy Har Har*	April 1, 2000	February 28, 2007	
Punkin' Puss & Mushmouse*	April 1, 2000	October 3, 2011	
Ricochet Rabbit & Droop-a-Long*	April 1, 2000	October 3, 2011	
Samson & Goliath	April 1, 2000	December 14, 2020	
Snooper and Blabber	April 1, 2000	September 27, 2002	
Touché Turtle and Dum Dum*	April 1, 2000	2006	
Yakky Doodle*	April 1, 2000	2011	
Yippee, Yappee and Yahooey	April 1, 2000	2011	
The Skatebirds	April 1, 2000	2004	
CB Bears	April 1, 2000	2004	
Paddington Bear**	April 1, 2000	December 3, 2019	
The Superman/Batman Adventures	April 1, 2000	September 13, 2008	
The Fantastic Four	April 1, 2000	October 10, 2009	
Godzilla	April 1, 2000	2003	
The Herculoids	April 1, 2000	June 5, 2011	
The Pirates of Dark Water	April 1, 2000	April 29, 2011	
Super Friends*	April 1, 2000	September 28, 2008	
SWAT Kats: The Radical Squadron	April 1, 2000	November 3, 2013	
Valley of the Dinosaurs	April 1, 2000	October 2, 2011	
The Ruff and Reddy Show	April 1, 2000	January 1, 2004	
Birdman and the Galaxy Trio	April 1, 2000	October 10, 2009	
Moby Dick and Mighty Mightor	April 1, 2000	October 10, 2009	
Shazzan	April 1, 2000	October 10, 2009	
Frankenstein Jr. and The Impossibles	April 1, 2000	December 31, 2006	
The Banana Splits	April 1, 2000	December 25, 2013	
Inch High, Private Eye	January 1, 2001	February 25, 2011	
The Perils of Penelope Pitstop	January 1, 2001	July 22, 2012	
Speed Buggy	February 6, 2001	June 1, 2014	
Josie and the Pussycats in Outer Space	April 9, 2001	November 27, 2011	
Devlin	April 28, 2001	March 30, 2008	
Wheelie and the Chopper Bunch	April 28, 2001	2004	
Wally Gator*	May 1, 2001	April 21, 2024	
Casper and the Angels	June 4, 2001	2004	
Help!... It's the Hair Bear Bunch!	June 4, 2001	July 22, 2012	
The Pebbles and Bamm-Bamm Show	June 4, 2001	May 30, 2014	
Richie Rich	June 4, 2001	November 1, 2013	
Snorks	June 4, 2001	February 28, 2014	
Cattanooga Cats	July 2, 2001	December 25, 2013	
Galtar and the Golden Lance	July 2, 2001	2002	
The Great Grape Ape Show	July 2, 2001	November 22, 2012	
Hong Kong Phooey	July 2, 2001	December 25, 2013	
The Amazing Chan and the Chan Clan	July 14, 2001	March 31, 2011	
The Roman Holidays	July 14, 2001	2004	
Sealab 2020	July 14, 2001	October 2, 2011	
The Funky Phantom	August 6, 2001	October 31, 2013	
Goober and the Ghost Chasers	August 6, 2001	October 31, 2013	
The Super Globetrotters	August 6, 2001	August 5, 2012	
Sky Commanders	September 9, 2001	2005	
The Space Kidettes	September 9, 2001	May 1, 2011	
Young Samson	September 9, 2001	May 1, 2011	
Dastardly and Muttley in Their Flying Machines	September 10, 2001	May 27, 2012	
Dynomutt, Dog Wonder	September 10, 2001	September 4, 2011	
Loopy De Loop*	September 10, 2001	2009	
Where's Huddles?	September 12, 2001	September 3, 2007	
Butch Cassidy and the Sundance Kids	December 1, 2001	2004	
Galaxy Goof-Ups	December 15, 2001	April 1, 2024	
The Peter Potamus Show / Breezly and Sneezly*	February 4, 2002	October 3, 2011	
Clue Club	April 1, 2002	June 4, 2011	
Captain Caveman and the Teen Angels	June 8, 2002	December 29, 2007	
The New Shmoo	June 8, 2002	December 1, 2006	
The Kwicky Koala Show	June 15, 2002	September 30, 2011	
Trollkins	June 15, 2002	2003	
Pac-Man*	June 22, 2002	December 14, 2020	
Shirt Tales	June 22, 2002	July 22, 2012	
The Adventures of Gulliver	June 30, 2002	September 30, 2011	
The New Adventures of Huckleberry Finn	June 30, 2002	2004	
The Completely Mental Misadventures of Ed Grimley*	July 1, 2002	December 31, 2007	
The 13 Ghosts of Scooby-Doo	October 3, 2003	March 10, 2024	
2 Stupid Dogs / Super Secret Secret Squirrel*	April 4, 2005	June 1, 2014	
Captain Planet and the Planeteers*	April 22, 2005	April 27, 2024	
The Addams Family	April 10, 2006	October 31, 2013	
Wait Till Your Father Gets Home*	September 18, 2006	January 1, 2008	
Paw Paws	January 2, 2008	February 29, 2008	
Pound Puppies	January 2, 2008	February 1, 2013	
Fantastic Max	June 1, 2009	November 1, 2013	

==== Hanna-Barbera Studios Europe ====
Title	Premiere date	End date	Source(s)
The Amazing World of Gumball	December 1, 2014	September 29, 2023	

==== Ruby-Spears Productions ====
Title	Premiere date	End date	Source(s)
Centurions	April 1, 2000	December 3, 2010	
Fangface	April 1, 2002	June 4, 2011	
Heathcliff	June 8, 2002	December 31, 2007	
Goldie Gold and Action Jack	June 15, 2002	2004	
Chuck Norris: Karate Kommandos	June 30, 2002	2005	
Dragon's Lair	June 30, 2002	2006	
Mister T*	June 30, 2002	April 1, 2006	
Young Robin Hood	June 30, 2002	2007	
Dink, the Little Dinosaur	March 10, 2008	October 2, 2011	

==== Live-action ====
Title	Premiere date	End date	Source(s)
Out of Jimmy's Head (Note: "Friends" episode only)	October 1, 2007	October 5, 2007	

==== Preschool ====
Title	Premiere date	End date	Source(s)
Harry and His Bucket Full of Dinosaurs	November 23, 2005		(Note: Harry and His Bucket Full of Dinosaurs aired during Tickle-U, a programming block aimed at a preschool audience, that was broadcast simultaneously on Cartoon Network for cross-promotional purposes.)
Gerald McBoing-Boing	November 23, 2005	December 31, 2009	(Note: Gerald McBoing-Boing aired during Tickle-U, a programming block aimed at a preschool audience, that was broadcast simultaneously on Cartoon Network for cross-promotional purposes. The show began airing separately in February 2007.)
Care Bears: Unlock the Magic	February 1, 2019	November 2, 2024	(Note: Care Bears: Unlock the Magic was first released on Boomerang's SVOD subscription service on February 1, 2019.)
Bugs Bunny Builders	January 21, 2023	January 22, 2023	

==== Anthology ====
Title	Premiere date	End date	Source(s)
ToonHeads	July 4, 2005	December 3, 2006	
The Popeye Show	December 4, 2006	June 2, 2007	

=== Acquired programming from Cartoon Network/Kids' WB ===
==== Animated ====
Title	Premiere date	End date	Source(s)
He-Man and the Masters of the Universe	January 28, 2006	March 31, 2006	
Pokémon	July 31, 2006	February 5, 2017	
Krypto the Superdog	February 5, 2007	January 3, 2014	
Fantastic Four: World's Greatest Heroes	September 6, 2008	May 17, 2009	
The Mr. Men Show	March 30, 2009	February 1, 2013	
Pink Panther and Pals	July 19, 2010	January 30, 2015	
Almost Naked Animals	March 5, 2012	November 3, 2013	
Hero: 108	February 4, 2013	May 30, 2014	
Casper's Scare School	February 4, 2013	January 3, 2014	
The Garfield Show	February 4, 2013	December 30, 2016	
Grojband	June 15, 2013	July 12, 2015	(Note: Grojband was originally shown on Cartoon Network in 2013, and select episodes were shown on Boomerang on June 25, 2013 as part of a special airing (before the episodes aired on Cartoon Network) for cross-promotional purposes. After it was removed from Cartoon Network in 2014, the series moved to Boomerang for the last 13 episodes of the series, which were previously released exclusively online.)
Sonic Boom	October 8, 2015	March 30, 2018	
DreamWorks Dragons	October 9, 2015	January 29, 2016	
Transformers: Robots in Disguise	December 6, 2015	April 10, 2016	
My Knight and Me	April 3, 2017	June 3, 2018	
Cloudy with a Chance of Meatballs	January 11, 2018	January 24, 2020	
Mega Man: Fully Charged	August 12, 2018	May 26, 2019	
Power Players	February 18, 2020	July 3, 2020	
Total DramaRama	May 2, 2022	October 31, 2022	
Lamput	August 15, 2022	August 26, 2022	

==== Live-action ====
Title	Premiere date	End date	Source(s)
Hole in the Wall	October 14, 2010	September 30, 2011	

=== Short-form programming ===
Title	First aired	Last aired
Boomerang-A-Long	April 1, 2000	January 19, 2015
Cartoon Network Groovies	April 1, 2000	January 19, 2015
Cartoon Network Shorties	April 1, 2000	June 1, 2014
Retromercials	April 1, 2000	June 1, 2014
Wedgies	October 5, 2013	December 28, 2015
Powfactor	November 1, 2016	January 2, 2017

=== Blocks ===
Title	Premiere date	End date	Source(s)
Boomeraction	April 1, 2000	June 2, 2014	
Boomerang Theater	January 22, 2005	November 22, 2024	
The Boomerang Christmas Party	December 18, 2000	December 25, 2014	
Hanna-Barbera's Cartoon Corral	June 2, 2003	2005	
June Bugs	June 6, 2003	June 7, 2004	
Character of the Month	August 9, 2003	May 6, 2007	
Scooberang	October 3, 2003	October 31, 2004	
Acme Hour	2005		
Boomerang Zoo	April 4, 2005	October 2, 2011	
Boomeracers	August 29, 2005	July 22, 2012	
Tickle-U	November 23, 2005		
No Undies Mondays	October 9, 2006	2008	
Late Night Black & White	May 7, 2007	December 27, 2008	
Boomeroyalty	May 12, 2007	July 22, 2012	
Boomerandom	September 7, 2008	February 22, 2009	
Those Meddling Kids!	December 1, 2008	September 30, 2011	
New Episode Weekends	January 10, 2015	July 12, 2015	
Pet of the Week	June 8, 2015	September 4, 2015	
Weeknights at 8:30	October 5, 2015	January 29, 2016	
Scoobtober	October 1, 2020	October 31, 2020	
Boomerang Family Feast	November 26, 2020	November 29, 2020	
A Very Merry Jerry	December 1, 2020	December 31, 2020	

== Digital content ==
This section lists shows that were only made available on Boomerang's SVOD subscription service prior to its shutdown in September 2024.

=== Programming from Cartoon Network/Kids' WB ===
==== Cartoon Network Studios ====
Title	First day on the SVOD	Last day on the SVOD	Source(s)
The Life and Times of Juniper Lee	April 11, 2017	September 30, 2024	
My Gym Partner's a Monkey	April 11, 2017	September 30, 2024	

==== Hanna-Barbera Cartoons ====
Title	First day on the SVOD	Last day on the SVOD	Source(s)
Droopy, Master Detective	April 11, 2017	September 30, 2024	
Monchhichis	January 3, 2019	September 30, 2024	
The New Fred and Barney Show	March 28, 2019	September 30, 2024	

== See also ==
- List of programs broadcast by Cartoon Network
- List of programs broadcast by Cartoonito
- List of programs broadcast by Adult Swim
- List of programs broadcast by Toonami
- List of programs broadcast by Discovery Family
- List of programs broadcast by Nickelodeon
- List of programs broadcast by the Nick Jr. Channel
- List of programs broadcast by Nicktoons
- List of programs broadcast by TeenNick
- List of programs broadcast by Nick at Nite
- Boomerang
