= List of programs broadcast by Nick at Nite =

The following is a list of programs broadcast by the American nighttime block Nick at Nite.

== Current programming ==
Title	Premiere date	Source(s)
Friends	September 5, 2011	
SpongeBob SquarePants	July 16, 2018	
The Neighborhood	June 18, 2024	
The Big Bang Theory	December 24, 2024	

== Former programming ==
=== Original programming ===
Title	Premiere date	Finale date
Live-action
On the Television	April 1, 1989	1990
Hi Honey, I'm Home!	July 21, 1991	July 12, 1992
Inside TV Land	February 24, 2002	February 4, 2004
Family Face Off: Hollywood	November 29, 2004	December 27, 2004
The Search for the Funniest Mom in America	May 3, 2005	May 13, 2007
Hi-Jinks	August 2, 2005	October 31, 2006
At the Poocharelli's	April 11, 2006	May 30, 2006
Bet the House	June 8, 2007	2008
Family BrainSurge	July 18, 2011	November 17, 2011
Hollywood Heights	June 18, 2012	August 10, 2012
See Dad Run	October 6, 2012	December 4, 2014
Wendell & Vinnie^{1}	August 18, 2013	September 22, 2013
Instant Mom^{2} ^{3}	September 29, 2013	June 24, 2016
Animated
Fatherhood	June 20, 2004	November 27, 2005
Glenn Martin, DDS	August 17, 2009	November 7, 2011

=== Programming from Nickelodeon ===
Title	Year(s) aired	Note(s)
All That	June 25 – November 4, 2012; June 16, 2019 – June 6, 2020	^{1}
America's Most Musical Family	November 2, 2019 – January 18, 2020	^{1}
Are You Afraid of the Dark?	October 12 – 26, 2019; February 14 – 27, 2021	^{1}
Are You Smarter than a 5th Grader?	June 10 – July 24, 2019	^{1}
The Barbarian and the Troll	April 4 – 9, 2021	^{1}
The Crystal Maze	February 1 – 9, 2020	^{1}
Danger Force	March 28, 2020 – December 10, 2021	^{1}
Double Dare (2018)	July 1 – 22, 2018	^{1}
Drama Club	April 6 – 24, 2021	^{1}
Group Chat	May 29 – November 6, 2020	^{1}
Henry Danger	February 1, 2019 – March 8, 2020	^{1}
Kamp Koral: SpongeBob's Under Years	January 28, 2022	^{1}
Kenan & Kel	June 25 – July 12, 2012	^{1}
The Loud House	December 10, 2016; October 15 – November 29, 2021	^{1}
Middlemost Post	July 13 – September 1, 2021	^{1}
Monster High	November 11, 2022	^{1}
NFL Slimetime	September 17, 2021 – January 22, 2022; January 22, 2025	^{1}
The Patrick Star Show	July 16 – August 27, 2021	^{1}
Rugrats	August 25 – December 2, 2000	^{1}
The Substitute	October 11, 2019 – March 15, 2020	^{1}
That Girl Lay Lay	September 25 – October 16, 2021	^{1}
Top Elf	November 30, 2019; November 22 – 29, 2020	^{1}
Tyler Perry's Young Dylan	March 1 – July 30, 2020	^{1}
Unleashed	October 24 – November 14, 2020	^{1}
Wylde Pak	June 27, 2025	^{1}

=== Acquired programming ===
Title	Year(s) aired	Note(s)
227	March 8 – 25, 2001	
Adventures of Superman	September 20, 1991 – September 3, 1995	^{1}
ALF	March 7 – April 1, 2001	
Alfred Hitchcock Presents	August 4, 1990 – December 31, 1994; June 28, 1995	
All in the Family	October 12, 1998 – February 25, 2004	
America 2-Night	April 2, 1990 – March 29, 1993	
America's Funniest Home Videos	April 30 – October 12, 2007; February 13 – 17, 2024	^{1}
The Andy Griffith Show	July 3, 2000 – November 24, 2002	^{3}
The Ann Sothern Show; Susie	January 5, 1987 – June 26, 1995	
The Bad News Bears	March 7 – December 5, 1987	^{1}
The Betty White Show	May 12, 1996 – March 15, 1998	
The Beverly Hillbillies	January 24, 2000 – August 9, 2002	
Bewitched	September 4, 1989 – August 31, 1991; June 6, 1994 – August 27, 2000	
The Bob Newhart Show	September 13, 1993 – December 6, 1998	
The Brady Bunch	February 12 – 16, 1995; June 1, 1998 – February 2, 2003; May 21 – June 24, 2012	
Car 54, Where Are You?	July 1, 1987 – March 31, 1990; June 27, 1995	
Charles in Charge	August 16, 2002 – April 3, 2003	
Cheers	October 7, 2001 – June 23, 2005	^{4}
Coach	September 28, 2002 – December 18, 2003	
The Cosby Show	March 3, 2002 – August 29, 2010	
Dennis the Menace	July 1, 1985 – March 1990	^{1}
Designing Women	October 2, 2006 – December 8, 2008	
The Dick Van Dyke Show	September 30, 1991 – June 11, 2000	
A Different World	July 19, 2006 – March 5, 2008	
Diff'rent Strokes	March 4, 2001 – February 17, 2002	
The Donna Reed Show	July 1, 1985 – June 26, 1995	
Dragnet	January 4, 1991 – December 31, 1995; December 29, 1998	
Everybody Hates Chris	September 7, 2009 – September 3, 2012	
Everybody Loves Raymond	January 1 – August 28, 2015	^{3}
F Troop	October 5, 1991 – September 3, 1995	
The Facts of Life	September 4, 2000 – June 28, 2001	
Family Matters	June 29, 2008 – December 30, 2012	
Family Ties	September 23, 2001 – September 20, 2003; June 23, 2005	
Fernwood 2 Night	June 4, 1990 – March 28, 1993; June 28, 1995	
Flipper	January 20 – April 27, 1996	^{1}
The Fresh Prince of Bel-Air	September 13, 2004 – August 27, 2009; September 29, 2014 – May 13, 2018	
Full House	October 6, 2003 – September 28, 2021	(Note: Moved to MeTV (2022–23) and Catchy Comedy (2023–present).)
Get Smart	January 14, 1991 – June 28, 1995	^{3}
Gilligan's Island	June 4, 2000 – September 29, 2001	
George Lopez	September 10, 2007 – September 8, 2020	(Note: Moved to TBS (2020–23).)
The Goldbergs	September 18, 2017 – September 22, 2018	
Green Acres	November 1, 1989 – October 31, 1992; May 4, 1996 – December 27, 1998	
Growing Pains	June 21, 2005; February 12, 2007 – August 18, 2008	^{4}
Hangin' with Mr. Cooper	March 18 – June 10, 2001; January 13 – September 28, 2014	
Happy Days	September 9, 1996 – September 4, 2000; October 26, 2002 – February 2, 2003	
Head of the Class	July 7, 2000; February 3 – September 20, 2003	
Home Improvement	September 3, 2007 – February 24, 2012	
How I Met Your Mother	September 8, 2014 – June 26, 2015	^{3}
I Dream of Jeannie	June 6, 1994 – September 5, 1997; August 4, 2000	
I Love Lucy	February 14, 1994 – September 29, 2001; April 11, 2003	
I Spy	May 4, 1986 – September 9, 1988; February 2, 1998	
The Jeff Foxworthy Show	July 23, 2005 – July 15, 2006	
The Jeffersons	January 25, 1999 – August 25, 2006	
The King of Queens	January 1 – November 10, 2019	
Kids Say the Darndest Things (Cosby)	December 26, 2001 – August 21, 2005	
Lancelot Link, Secret Chimp	May 7, 1988 – March 25, 1989	^{1}
Lassie	July 1985 – September 1988, 1989–96	^{1}
Laverne & Shirley	July 6, 1998 – October 31, 2001	
Looney Tunes	April 8, 1989 – March 28, 1993	^{1}
The Lucy–Desi Comedy Hour	July 2, 1994 – September 23, 2000	
The Lucy Show	April 6, 1992 – May 5, 1996	
Mad About You	April 10, 2006 – September 8, 2008	
Mad Movies with the L.A. Connection	March 7, 1987 – February 25, 1989	
Make Room for Daddy	February 1, 1988 – January 27, 1991	
Malcolm in the Middle	July 5, 2009 – September 15, 2010	
The Many Loves of Dobie Gillis	April 2, 1990 – September 12, 1993; December 30, 1998	
Married... with Children	July 6 – August 17, 2011	
The Mary Tyler Moore Show	September 12, 1992 – June 11, 2000	
Mike & Molly	October 5, 2021 – August 9, 2024; October 8 – December 24, 2024	
Mister Ed	March 3, 1986 – January 31, 1993; June 30, 1997	^{1}
Modern Family	September 9, 2024 – August 30, 2026	
Mom	July 3, 2018 – September 2, 2024	
The Monkees	October 12, 1986 – September 9, 1988; July 7 – August 18, 1997	^{1}
Mork & Mindy	March 4, 1991 – September 24, 1995; July 4, 1997	^{1}
Mr. Wizard's World	1991 – 1995	^{1}
The Munsters	June 30, 1995 – August 3, 2002	
Murphy Brown	January 24, 2005 – August 11, 2008	^{4}
My Three Sons	November 3, 1985 – October 30, 1991; June 18, 2000	
My Wife and Kids	August 30, 2010 – March 18, 2014	
The Nanny	May 10, 2009 – October 26, 2013	
National Geographic Explorer	July 1, 1985 – January 11, 1986	^{1}
The New Adventures of Old Christine	October 7, 2013 – March 23, 2014	^{3}
Newhart	March 17, 1997 – October 1, 2000	
NewsRadio	July 17 – December 17, 2006	
The Odd Couple	June 3, 1996 – May 29, 1998	
The Office	January 1 – May 5, 2019	
The Partridge Family	July 12, 1993 – August 28, 1994; January 24, 1997	
The Patty Duke Show	September 12, 1988 – August 31, 1993; June 28, 1995	^{1}
Paw Patrol	July 1 – 19, 2019	^{1}
Perfect Strangers	July 14, 2000; February 3 – September 20, 2003	
Phyllis	May 12, 1996 – March 15, 1998	
Pinky and the Brain	2001	^{1}
Rhoda	May 10, 1996 – July 11, 1998	
Roc	February 2 – 23, 2001	
Roseanne	September 22, 2003 – December 30, 2009	
Route 66	July 1, 1985 – June 30, 1987; June 26, 1995	
Rowan & Martin's Laugh-In	October 5, 1987 – July 29, 1990; April 29, 1997	
Sabrina, the Teenage Witch	September 28, 2003 – September 4, 2005	^{1}
The Best of Saturday Night Live	September 4, 1988 – August 17, 1991; April 29, 1997	
SCTV	September 10, 1988 – March 4, 1990; June 27, 1995	
Seinfeld	May 31 – November 12, 2022	(Note: Moved to TV Land (2023–present).)
Silver Spoons	March 5 – April 1, 2001	
The Smothers Brothers Show	May 4, 1986 – March 25, 1989; June 27, 1995	
The Smurfs	September 13 – November 12, 2021	^{1}
Taxi	November 6, 1994 – January 21, 2001	
That '70s Show	May 30, 2011 – September 28, 2014	^{2}
Three's Company	October 15, 2000 – August 25, 2006	
Turkey Television	July 1, 1985 – January 1986	^{1}
Two and a Half Men	December 6, 2017 – July 1, 2018	^{4}
Welcome Back, Kotter	May 29, 1995 – May 31, 1996; December 3, 1999	
The White Shadow	September 3, 1994 – May 5, 1996	
Who's the Boss?	June 14, 2004 – May 14, 2006	
Wings	March 31, 2003 – August 6, 2005	
WKRP in Cincinnati	July 5, 1999 – December 31, 2000	
The Wonder Years	October 13, 1997 – January 21, 2001	^{1}
Yes, Dear	May 1, 2012 – May 4, 2014	
Young Sheldon	November 30, 2020 – November 10, 2022; March 25 – December 20, 2024	

==== Programming from Paramount networks (TV Land, CMT, Comedy Central) ====
Title	Year(s) aired	Note(s)
The Assistants	July 7, 2009	
Awkwafina Is Nora from Queens	January 22 – February 15, 2020	
The Daily Show with Trevor Noah	September 28, 2015	
Happily Divorced	June 28, 2011	
Hot in Cleveland	June 20, 2010 – January 10, 2016	^{3}
iCarly (2021)	July 17, 2021 – June 3, 2023	
I Pity the Fool	October 11, 2006	
Impastor	July 15, 2015 – September 28, 2016	^{3}
The Jim Gaffigan Show	July 15, 2015 – June 19, 2016	^{3}
Lopez	March 30 – September 4, 2016	^{3}
Nashville	December 15, 2016 – August 10, 2017	
Nobodies	April 3, 2017	
The Soul Man	July 8, 2012 – April 22, 2015	
Still the King	June 8 – August 14, 2016	
Teachers	February 15 – March 21, 2016	^{3}
Younger	March 31, 2015 – September 28, 2016	^{3}

==== Special/cross-promotional airings ====
Title	Year(s) aired	Note(s)
The Addams Family	April 29, 1996 – October 30, 1997	part of TV Land preview
Avatar: The Last Airbender	August 16, 2020	^{1}
Batman	April 28, 2001 – June 30, 2003	^{1}
Benson	June 22, 2005	^{4}
Bob	March 18–20, 1997	
The Brady Girls Get Married	February 13, 1995	part of "Buncha Brady"
The Brady Bunch Hour	December 31, 1990; September 1, 1991; February 14, 1995	
The Brady Kids	February 12–16, 1995	^{1}
Brooklyn Bridge	July 2, 1997	
The Bugaloos	September 16, 1995 – May 20, 2014	part of Pufapalooza
Cannon	June 8, 1996	part of TV Land preview
Carol Burnett and Friends	November 26, 2002	
The Dean Martin Show	April 29, 1997	part of TV Land preview
Donny and Marie	March 21, 1992	
Electra Woman and Dyna Girl	September 16, 1995; December 6, 1997	part of Pufapalooza
The Ed Sullivan Show	April 29, 1996 – April 29, 1997	part of TV Land preview
The Flip Wilson Show	April 29 – August 18, 1997	part of TV Land preview
Gunsmoke	April 29, 1996; June 30, 1997	part of TV Land preview
Have Gun – Will Travel	July 4, 1997	part of TV Land preview
Here's Lucy	February 14 – 16, 1996	
Hill Street Blues	April 29, 1996 – July 1, 1997	part of TV Land preview
Hogan's Heroes	April 29, 1996	part of TV Land preview
The Honeymooners	December 18, 1995 – November 27, 2002	
Honey West	April 29, 1996	part of TV Land preview
H.R. Pufnstuf	September 16, 1995; December 6, 1997	part of Pufapalooza
Julia	February 2, 1998 – February 9, 2001	
Kate & Allie	June 22, 2005	^{4}
Land of the Lost	September 16, 1995; December 6, 1997	part of Pufapalooza
Leave It to Beaver	June 7, 1999 – August 2, 2002	
Lidsville	September 16, 1995; December 6, 1997	part of Pufapalooza
Life with Lucy	February 14, 1996	
Love, American Style	April 29, 1996 – February 13, 2000	
Mannix	April 29 – July 6, 1996	part of TV Land preview
Maude	October 4, 1999 – February 16, 2001	
Moonlighting	June 21, 2005	^{4}
My Mother the Car	April 29, 1996	part of TV Land preview
Night Court	June 23, 2005	^{4}
Petticoat Junction	April 29 – August 18, 1996	part of TV Land preview
The Phil Silvers Show	March 26, 1996 – July 4, 1997	part of TV Land preview
Room 222	January 24, 1997	one episode
Sanford and Son	February 2, 1998 – August 1, 2003	
Sigmund and the Sea Monsters	September 16, 1995; December 6, 1997	part of Pufapalooza
The Sonny & Cher Comedy Hour	December 31, 1989; September 1, 1991; December 1995 – April 29, 1997	
St. Elsewhere	April 29, 1996 – July 3, 1997	part of TV Land preview
That Girl	April 29 – August 18, 1996	part of TV Land preview
The Time Element	April 29, 1996	part of TV Land preview

== Movie presentations ==
=== Former ===
- Nick at Nite Movie (1985–88)
- Nick at Nite Tuesday Movie of the Week (2007–14)
- Nick at Nite Movie Nite (2014–19)
- Wild About Movies (2019–21)
- Family Movie Night (2021–24)

== Television specials ==
Occasionally, episodes of Rugrats and SpongeBob SquarePants have aired regularly or as marathons during Nick at Nite special events in the 1990s and 2000s. This has also occurred during crossovers with Nickelodeon special programming where the Nickelodeon programming runs into the regular Nick at Nite timeslot. A 30-year reunion special of Double Dare aired on November 23, 2016. Regular marathons occur on Nick at Nite. Usually when a show debuts, it receives an all-night or a week-long marathon. Seasonal marathons also occur for holidays such as Valentine's Day, St. Patrick's Day, Mother's Day, Father's Day, Halloween, Thanksgiving, and Christmas.

On June 17, 2019, Nick at Nite aired a simulcast of the 2019 MTV Movie & TV Awards for the first time, along with many of its sister networks. On August 26, it also aired a simulcast of the 2019 MTV Video Music Awards for the first time. In December 2019, Nick at Nite began airing a marathon of Friends to celebrate the show's 25 year anniversary since its finale throughout half of Nick at Nite's regular programming time. Nick at Nite aired a simulcast of the widely distributed One World: Together at Home on April 18, 2020.

== See also ==
- List of programs broadcast by Nickelodeon
- List of programs broadcast by the Nick Jr. Channel
- List of programs broadcast by Nicktoons
- List of programs broadcast by TeenNick
- List of Nickelodeon original films
- Nickelodeon
- Nick at Nite
- TV Land

== Notes ==
^{1} Indicates program that had also been broadcast on Nickelodeon.
^{2} Indicates program that had also been broadcast on NickMom.
^{3} Indicates program that is/had also been on TV Land.
^{4} Indicates program that aired as part of Nick at Nite's 20 Years.
