= Natalie's Backseat Traveling Web Show =

- Directed by: Mark Foster
- Starring: Raina Feig
- Country of origin: United States
- Original language: English
- No. of episodes: About 10 or more

Production
- Producer: Karen Fowler
- Running time: Approx. 3 minutes

Original release
- Network: Nickelodeon
- Release: 1996 – 1998

Natalie's Backseat Traveling Web Show is a television series consisting of 3-minute shorts on Nickelodeon in the mid to late 1990s.

== Development and production ==
The series was developed by Karen Fowler and Parker Reilly and directed by Mark Foster for Nickelodeon's Creative Labs. The website was written by Caitilin McAdoo and Carmen Morais, with web design and programming by Fusebox, Inc. The original scores were composed by Michael Aharon.

== Premise ==
The series followed a preteen girl named Natalie who managed a live web diary while her family traveled across the United States while in the backseat of the family van. The character Natalie's web site, which later became Nick.com, would also contain games, photos, audio, and video clips along with written words about the character's thoughts and musings. The website and television shorts launched simultaneously in 1996, as both correlated with the other. The show was created before weblogs, audioblogs, photo blogs, and vlogs rose in popularity in the 2000s.

== See also ==
- iCarly
