= First Row Features =

- Country of origin: United States
- Original language: English

Production
- Running time: 1 hour

Original release
- Network: Nickelodeon
- Release: February 1980 – January 1982

First Row Features is an American anthology series that premiered on the television network Nickelodeon in February 1980 and continued to air until January 1982. It mainly carried British television films (mostly from the Children's Film Foundation) for children and family audiences, most of which were filmed in the 1950s–60s. It featured a claymation title sequence created in-house at Nickelodeon's temporary headquarters in Buffalo, New York. First Row Features was a predecessor to the similarly formatted Special Delivery, which debuted later in the same year and eventually replaced it.

== Overview ==
The program featured made-for-TV films from the United Kingdom, which were selected by employees at Nickelodeon. In January 1982, the Gannett newspaper The Times described the show as a collection of "one hour feature films for children ranging from comedies and adventures to dramas and semi-documentaries." Although most of the content on First Row Features had been filmed and released in Europe decades earlier, the films were marketed as new to U.S. viewers. New films premiered on Mondays, Wednesdays, and Fridays. At the time of its creation, First Row Features was one of only five programs that were aired in a loop to fill the entire Nickelodeon schedule. It was non-commercial and advertisements were never played between features.

== Films featured ==
Title	Year of film	Nickelodeon airdate	Reference
Title sequence	1980	August 27, 1980	
What Next?	1974	November 9, 1980	
Cup Fever	1965	December 30, 1980	
The Rescue Squad	1963	December 31, 1980	
Anoop and the Elephant	1972	January 1, 1981	
The Kid from Canada	1958	January 2, 1981	
All at Sea	1969	January 10, 1981	
Juvenile Justice	Unknown	July 12, 1981	
Lone Wolf	Unknown	July 13, 1981	
Mischief	Unknown	July 15, 1981	
Operation Third Form	1966	July 17, 1981	
The Hunch	1967	July 20, 1981	
Adventure in the Hopfields	1954	August 5, 1981	
Bungala Boys	1961	December 6, 1981	
The Christmas Tree	1966	December 25, 1981	
