= List of Nickelodeon short films =

This is a list of short films that appeared on Nickelodeon, Nicktoons and the Nick Jr. Channel

== Innie and Outie (1996) ==
Two friends (voiced by Christy Romano and Jessica DiCicco) go to see a movie for the day. The faces are people's stomachs with facial features drawn on them to simulate speech and actions, like drinking.

== Nickelodeon USA (acquired shorts) ==
=== Muppet Beach Party ===
The Muppets cover "Kokomo" and "Wipe Out" in two music videos which aired on Nickelodeon in the mid-1990s.

== Nick Jr. shorts ==
=== Hocle and Stoty ===
Hocle and Stoty is an American short-form children's television series originally airing on Nickelodeon as part of the Nick Jr. block. The series was created by David Rudman and Adam Rudman and uses puppetry.

The series' production was documented in an art exhibit at the Art Center Highland Park in Highland Park, Illinois from 2010 until 2013.

=== Amby and Dexter ===
Amby & Dexter was a series of animated interstitials on Nick Jr. in 1997, created by Paul Fierlinger and his wife Sandra Schuette.

== Nicktoons Network ==
=== Fowl Play ===
The short's name is a pun on the phrase foul play. In Fowl Play, penguins and ducks play an exciting soccer game with music in the background. In the end, the music shifts, and a team of three ostriches catch the ball, ready to challenge the teams. It was made by Christopher DeSantis and won the Nicktoons Creator Award.
