= Tooned In =

American television quiz show

- Genre: Game show
- Directed by: Genji Keen
- Presented by: Jerry Trainor
- Voices of: Rama Vallury
- Country of origin: United States
- Original language: English
- No. of seasons: 2
- No. of episodes: 36

Production
- Executive producers: Ashley Kaplan; Paul J. Medford; Luke Wahl; Jana Blumenthal (S2); Jack Martin (S2)
- Producers: Mallory Arkin; Alexander Hoffman; Kyle Moffatt; Phil Moore (S1)
- Running time: 20–22 minutes
- Production company: Nickelodeon Productions

Original release
- Network: Nickelodeon
- Release: February 8, 2021 – July 1, 2022

Tooned In is an American game show that aired on Nickelodeon from February 8, 2021 to July 1, 2022.

== Premise ==
In Tooned In, an animated A.I. robot named Nicky (voiced by Rama Vallury) hosts a game show where kid contestants compete in a battle of Nickelodeon cartoon knowledge for the chance to be named the night's big winner and take home exciting prizes. Each episode features three kids who must solve animation questions across slime-filled rounds of trivia until only one contestant is left in the competition. The final kid will then be declared the episode's big winner and move on to a special prize round to compete against Nicky and climb the robot's motherboard for a chance to win the $1,000 grand prize.

== Gameplay ==
The game is divided into two rounds; in the first round, questions are asked on the buzzers and are worth 10 points each, with 10 points deducted for a wrong answer. In season two, five categories are shown for round one, with Nicky choosing the first and the player with the last correct answer choosing the next. Also in season two, questions are worth 100 points, with none being deducted for a wrong answer. In season one and briefly in season two, the players who failed to answer correctly got slimed after each question. In season two, every player gets slimed, usually after the category ends. The last question of the round is "The Impossible Question" where the three contestants are usually shown a picture or video with a certain number of objects and have to secretly enter a guess as to how many there are. Whoever is the closest, either high or low, receives 20 points (200 in season two).

In round two, questions are worth 20 points (200 in season two), up or down. In season one, there was a game that almost always appeared in round two called "Cartoon Cosplay" in which a man named "the Nicktoon Nickgoon" dressed up as a Nicktoon character and asked questions usually related to the character. In season two, the first game of the round is a stunt that the players must complete, in order to answer a question. The main game ends with a speed round called "All The Answers" where Nicky asks 10 questions while 12 possible answers are revealed on a monitor to his left. In the case of a tiebreaker, one more question is asked. Correct answers are worth +/-25 points (200 in season two), with the winner moving on to the bonus round.

=== Climb or Slime ===
The contestant has 60 seconds to answer 5 dual-choice questions, one on each level of the game board. The first correct answer is worth $100, while later correct answers increase by $50. When the contestant answers a question correctly, they move up to the next level on the board, going to one of the shows connected by a line. For every incorrect answer, the contestant has the option to either "Slime Reset" (being slimed, but being allowed to remain with the same show) and continue or move onto another show on the same level. The final category is chosen by the contestant before the round begins; as it is the only category on the top level, an incorrect answer automatically results in a "Slime Reset." If the contestant completes the game in 60 seconds, they win the $1,000 grand prize. If they fail to finish in time, they leave with the total amount won at that point, e.g., four correct answers earn the contestant $700 ($100+$150+$200+$250).

== Production ==
On January 29, 2021, the show was officially announced and premiered on February 8, 2021. On September 9, 2021, it was announced that Nickelodeon renewed the series for a second season, which premiered on September 17, 2021, with Jerry Trainor as co-host.

== Episodes ==
Winners are highlighted in bold.

=== Series overview ===
Season	Episodes	Originally released	
Season	Episodes	First released	Last released
1	18	February 8, 2021	March 6, 2021
2	18	September 17, 2021	July 1, 2022

=== Season 1 (2021) ===
No. overall	No. in season	Title	Original release date	Prod. code	U.S. viewers (millions)
1	1	"Time to Get Tooned In!"	February 8, 2021	104	0.49
Contestants: **Logan**, Sage, Benjaman
2	2	"Slime Splash Zone!"	February 9, 2021	108	0.40
Contestants: Milan, **Calum**, Brooklyn
3	3	"Slime Time!"	February 10, 2021	106	0.33
Contestants: **Ruari**, Zoe, Zakary
4	4	"Nicktoon Splatoon!"	February 11, 2021	105	0.28
Contestants: **Yazlynn**, Jayden, Shiloh
5	5	"Stay Tooned In!"	February 15, 2021	102	0.36
Contestants: Lucas, **Tida**, Rolo
6	6	"Green Looks Good on You!"	February 16, 2021	111	0.35
Contestants: **Jayden**, Anabella, Christian
7	7	"Slime is the New Green!"	February 17, 2021	107	0.24
Contestants: Kai, Amelie, **Anaiya**
8	8	"Quizzes, Quizzes, Quizzes!"	February 18, 2021	110	0.43
Contestants: **Gavin**, Mia, Allison
9	9	"Testing Your Wits!"	February 22, 2021	109	0.35
Contestants: Max, **Kalynn**, Lilah
10	10	"Riddle Me This!"	February 23, 2021	112	0.27
Contestants: Malakai, Joisy, **Paige**
11	11	"Time for More Slime!"	February 24, 2021	117	0.34
Contestants: Dylan, Camryn, **Nicholas**
12	12	"Slime-tastic Tests!"	February 25, 2021	101	0.34
Contestants: Brooklynne, CJ, **Harper**
13	13	"Your Royal Slime-ness!"	February 26, 2021	103	0.46
Contestants: Mara, Martha, **Elijah**
14	14	"More Questions, More Fun!"	March 1, 2021	113	0.33
Contestants: Eli, **Gabrial**, Lincoln
15	15	"Slime for All and All for Slime!"	March 2, 2021	114	0.32
Contestants: **Nicholas**, Kya, Matthew
16	16	"3, 2, 1, Slime!"	March 3, 2021	115	0.33
Contestants: Hayden, Bradley, **Rachelle**
17	17	"Oh, There's Plenty of Slime!"	March 4, 2021	116	0.36
Contestants: Bella, Natasha, **Frankie**
18	18	"Slimeaggedon!"	March 6, 2021	118	0.26
Contestants: Johnny, Leehie, **Nick**

=== Season 2 (2021–22) ===
No. overall	No. in season	Title	Original release date	Prod. code	U.S. viewers (millions)
19	1	"Aaliyah v Jack v Roman"	September 17, 2021	204	0.29
Contestants: Aaliyah, **Jack**, Roman
20	2	"Carson v Daniel v Isis"	September 24, 2021	207	0.21
Contestants: **Carson**, Daniel, Isis
21	3	"Braylon v Peyton v Roman"	October 1, 2021	209	0.21
Contestants: Peyton, Braylon, **Roman**
22	4	"Julian vs. Mia vs. Robyn"	October 8, 2021	208	0.31
Contestants: **Robyn**, Julian, Mia
23	5	"Alec v Brandon v Camryn"	October 15, 2021	206	0.30
Contestants: **Brandon**, Camryn, Alec
24	6	"Bella v Ellie v Evan"	October 29, 2021	223	0.30
Contestants: Bella, Ellie, **Evan**
25	7	"Ayden v Mila v Noa"	November 5, 2021	202	0.33
Contestants: **Ayden**, Mila, Noa
26	8	"Caleb v Mason v Sage"	November 12, 2021	203	0.26
Contestants: **Caleb**, Mason, Sage
27	9	"Bennett v Jolienne v Karina"	December 3, 2021	224	0.19
Contestants: Jolienne, **Bennett**, Karina
28	10	"Amelia v Francesca v London"	April 22, 2022	205	0.18
Contestants: Francesca, London, **Amelia**
29	11	"Alexis v Fia v Landon"	April 29, 2022	201	0.19
Contestants: Fia, **Alexis**, Landon
30	12	"Carson v Sadie v Tre"	May 6, 2022	210	0.16
Contestants: Sadie, **Carson**, Tre
31	13	"Deston v Kalea v Zuri"	May 13, 2022	211	0.18
Contestants: Zuri, Deston, **Kalea**
32	14	"Bailey v Johnny v Madeline"	June 3, 2022	212	0.18
Contestants: Bailey, **Madeline**, Johnny
33	15	"Carolina v Dominic v Zoe"	June 10, 2022	213	0.18
Contestants: **Dominic**, Zoe, Carolina
34	16	"Ella v Ian v Jayden"	June 17, 2022	214	N/A
Contestants: Ella, Ian, **Jayden**
35	17	"Angelina v Fabian v Olivia"	June 24, 2022	216	0.17
Contestants: Fabian, Angelina, **Olivia**
36	18	"Charles v Julia v Tori"	July 1, 2022	217	0.28
Contestants: **Charles**, Tori, Julia

== Ratings ==
Viewership and ratings per season of Tooned In
Season	Episodes	First aired		Last aired		Avg. viewers (millions)
Season	Episodes	Date	Viewers (millions)	Date	Viewers (millions)	Avg. viewers (millions)
1	18	February 8, 2021	0.49	March 6, 2021	0.26	0.34
2	17	September 17, 2021	0.29	July 1, 2022	0.28	0.23
