= Webheads =

- Genre: Children's game show
- Directed by: Steve Grant
- Presented by: Carlos PenaVega
- Composer: Michael Baiardi
- Country of origin: United States
- Original language: English
- No. of seasons: 1
- No. of episodes: 40

Production
- Executive producers: Ryan Seacrest; Robert Norris Catto; Brennan Huntington
- Producers: Gordon Cassidy; Scott Saltzburg; Tim Gaydos
- Camera setup: Videotape; Multi-camera
- Running time: 23 minutes
- Production companies: Ryan Seacrest Productions; Nickelodeon Productions

Original release
- Network: Nickelodeon (2014); Nicktoons (2015)
- Release: June 2, 2014 – October 9, 2015

Webheads (originally titled as Go Viral while in development) is an American children's game show on Nickelodeon, hosted by former Big Time Rush star and band member Carlos PenaVega. The series aired on Nickelodeon from June 2 to July 3, 2014, and on Nicktoons from September 14 to October 9, 2015.

== Format ==
Four contestants compete in a series of viral video viewing challenges.

=== Round 1: Buffering ===
Four videos are shown and on each video, it will pause at some point near the end. A question is then asked and the contestants are given three possible answers. Their job is to secretly pick the right one. The first video is worth 1 point, the second is worth 2, the third is worth 3, and the last video is worth 5 points. The maximum point total is 11 points. The player with the lowest score gets eliminated from the game, rides in the Surf the Web area, and receives a consolation prize.

=== Round 2: Memory Overload ===
The surviving three players have their scores reset to zero. The contestants are placed on an apparatus (either a large wheel that scrolls or a shaking trackpad). As they exercise on it, a series of videos are shown. When each video is finished, Carlos will start asking questions about the videos. On each question, the players must then buzz in (by hitting one of three buttons that would light up) the answer for the question. If one contestant is wrong, then another contestant would answer. Again, point values increase throughout the round. The first two videos have two questions each. The first pair is worth 10 and the second pair is worth 20. The last video has only one question, but it is worth 30 points. The maximum point total is 90 points. Again, the player with the lowest score is eliminated from the game and the two surviving players move on to the final round.

=== Tiebreaker: Video Remix ===
If there is a tie for the lowest score in the first two rounds, then the tied players play a game called "Video Remix". To start, a question is asked about a video where a certain part would play over and over again. The video would then play after the tied players locked in how many times that portion would play. The actual number would then be revealed and whoever has the closest guess advanced to the next round.

=== Round 3: Moment of Impact ===
Up to three videos are shown, and each one will be played twice. On the first play, the surviving two players will watch the video and indicate the moment of impact with a horn sound. On the second play, they will try to buzz in at the moment of impact. The player closest to buzzing in at the moment of the impact wins the video. Two videos will let them win the game and advance to the bonus round, while the other player gets eliminated, along with the player eliminated in round two, but the contestant in round three receives a consolation prize.

=== Bonus Round: Trending Now/The Spinning Wheel of Doom ===
During the final commercial break, the audience ranks four of the videos shown on that day's show from worst to best. Before the round starts, the player is shown the four videos that were voted on in random order. The player's job is to guess the correct ranking order by grabbing four tablets, representing the four clips one at a time, taking each in a spinning obstacle course called the Spinning Wheel of Doom consisting of several hurdles and a wall, and placing them in what they think is the proper order. When they are done, they press the button on the podium and Carlos tells them how many they got right (similar to the "Race Game" on The Price Is Right). After the first check out, the wall opens and will stay open for the rest of the round. On the second check out, Carlos tells the player that one of the videos in the correct position is right and would not need to change it. If the player can place them in the right order in 90 seconds or less, they win the grand prize and get to ride the "Slime Wave". When they get all four right, confetti would get shot out. If not, they receive a consolation prize and get sprayed with water.

== The Surf the Web Area ==
After each round, the eliminated players (including the one who lost the bonus round) get to ride a surfboard barefoot while wearing goggles and getting sprayed with water, while the grand prize winner would ride the "Slime Wave", featuring the trademark Nickelodeon slime.

== Episodes ==
No.	Title	Original release date	Prod. code	U.S. viewers (millions)
Nickelodeon
1	"Basketball Running Out"	June 2, 2014	101	2.06
2	"Long Jump Over People"	June 3, 2014	102	N/A
3	"Green Exercise Ball Jump"	June 4, 2014	103	1.88
4	"Flip Jumper"	June 5, 2014	104	N/A
5	"Backyard Basketball Half Court"	June 6, 2014	105	N/A
6	"Beach Model"	June 9, 2014	106	N/A
7	"Elevator Cop"	June 10, 2014	107	1.80
8	"Janky Bird"	June 11, 2014	108	N/A
9	"Trampoline Jump"	June 12, 2014	109	N/A
10	"Backyard Basketball Grass Flip"	June 13, 2014	110	N/A
11	"Hamster Wheel"	June 16, 2014	111	N/A
12	"Swan Dive in Snow"	June 17, 2014	112	N/A
13	"Umbrella Flyboard"	June 18, 2014	113	N/A
14	"Cake Boys"	June 19, 2014	114	N/A
15	"The Thundermans Celebrity Edition"	June 23, 2014	123	N/A
16	"Boys of Nick Celebrity Edition"	June 24, 2014	122	N/A
17	"The Haunted Hathaways Celebrity Edition"	June 25, 2014	121	N/A
18	"Girls of Nick Celebrity Edition"	June 26, 2014	125	N/A
19	"Holding Up Baby"	June 30, 2014	115	N/A
20	"Basketball Driveway"	July 1, 2014	116	N/A
21	"Father Daughter Piñata"	July 2, 2014	117	N/A
22	"Balancing Gymnastics"	July 3, 2014	118	N/A
Nicktoons
23	"Henry Danger Celebrity Edition"	September 14, 2015	124	0.20
24	"Slippery Slide"	September 15, 2015	119	0.25
25	"Nick App Edition No. 1"	September 16, 2015	131	0.14
26	"Two Cats"	September 17, 2015	120	0.17
27	"Nick App Edition No. 3"	September 18, 2015	132	N/A
28	"Pets Edition"	September 21, 2015	129	0.13
29	"Kayaker on the Rocks"	September 22, 2015	136	0.13
30	"Nick App Edition No. 4"	September 23, 2015	133	0.19
31	"Big Guy on Factory Forklift"	September 24, 2015	137	0.16
32	"Nick App Edition No. 2"	September 25, 2015	134	0.09
33	"All Sports"	September 28, 2015	126	0.11
34	"Jumping on Big Beach Ball"	September 29, 2015	138	0.22
35	"Nick App Edition No. 5"	September 30, 2015	135	0.15
36	"Bride and Fountain"	October 1, 2015	139	0.15
37	"Break Dancer Spins"	October 2, 2015	140	0.15
38	"The Great Outdoors Edition"	October 5, 2015	127	0.11
39	"Crazy Human Tricks Edition"	October 7, 2015	128	0.15
40	"Epic Fail Edition"	October 9, 2015	130	0.12
