= Rank the Prank =

British children's game show

- Genre: Game show; Comedy
- Directed by: Jason Garbett; Ravi Steve
- Narrated by: Sabrina Jalees
- Composer: Dobs Vye
- Countries of origin: United Kingdom; Canada
- Original language: English
- No. of seasons: 1
- No. of episodes: 12

Production
- Executive producers: Sid Cole; Johnathan Finkelstein
- Producers: Nick Hopkin; Jaymie Hansen
- Running time: 22 minutes
- Production companies: CBBC Production; Apartment 11 Productions

Original release
- Network: CBBC (UK); BBC Kids (Canada)
- Release: 3 September – 12 November 2016

Related
- Prank Patrol

Rank the Prank is a hidden camera game show show began on CBBC starting on 3 September 2016. In Canada it began on BBC Kids on 30 January 2017. A first look was released on 18 July 2016. It also premiered on Nickelodeon in the United States on 24 October 2016.

== Format ==
The show features two prank-loving kids are each teamed up with a Hollywood special effects master, to perform an incredible hidden-camera prank on the unknowing public. In a bid to out-prank each other, the child who pulls off the highest ranking prank will get the opportunity to stage the ultimate, mind-blowing hoax on their family or friends.

== The Effectors ==
The Effectors are a groups of stunt artists, special-effect artists and make-up artists who help the pranksters with their pranks. Sabrina Jalees narrates the series.

- Abbi Collins
- Rob Mayor
- Adrien Morot
- Marc Reichel
- Shaune Harrison
- Eliane Achkar
- Simon Tayler
- Andy Antonie
- Hassan Aziz
- Danny Hargreaves
- Nick Porter

== Episodes ==
| No. | Title | Directed by | Original release date |
|---|---|---|---|
| 1 | "Who's Got Talent?" | Jason Garbett | 3 September 2016 |
This time our pesky pranksters are Frizz Twins (Nubia and Mia) and Mischief Makers (Millie and Charlotte) who team up with creature creator and animatronics expert Rob Mayor and stunt coordinator Abbi Collins to stage the biggest and best pranks on an unsuspecting public.: Public Pranks: Frizz Twins - Orangutan Escape Mischief Makers - Copycat Gorilla; Winners: Mischief Makers; Mega Prank: Mischief Makers - Who's Got Talent?; Effectors: Rob Mayor and Abbi Collins
| 2 | "Hip Hop Legend" | Ravi Steve | 10 September 2016 |
Pretty Perfect Pranksters (Chelsea and Kailey) and Maya and Anjali's Shenanigans (Maya and Anjali) take over a food truck in a park.: Public Pranks: Pretty Perfect Pranksters - Human Popsicle Shenanigans - Monkey Business; Winners: Pretty Perfect Pranksters; Mega Prank: Pretty Perfect Pranksters - Hip Hop Legend; Effectors: Adrien Morot and Marc Reichel
| 3 | "Superhero Casting" | Jason Garbett | 17 September 2016 |
Shaune Harrison and Rob Mayor help Beastly Besties (Priya and Cosy) and Cheeky Pranksters (Joe and Will) take over Manchester Museum.: Public Pranks: Beastly Besties - Robot vs. Lizard Cheeky Pranksters - T-R'Eggs; Winners: Cheeky Pranksters; Mega Prank: Cheeky Pranksters - Superhero Casting; Effectors: Shaune Harrison and Rob Mayor
| 4 | "Mad Scientist" | Ravi Steve | 24 September 2016 |
Digital effects artist Eliane Achkar and make-up specialist Adrien Morot prankster duos Firebirds (Emilie and Mathieu) and Extreme Pranksters (Christopher and Roselyne) as they compete for a chance to pull a mega-prank.: Public Pranks: Firebirds - Dumb, Smart House Extreme Pranksters - Animal House; Winners: Extreme Pranksters; Mega Prank: Extreme Pranksters - Mad Scientist; Effectors: Eliane Achkar and Adrien Morot
| 5 | "Cake Off!" | Jason Garbett | 1 October 2016 |
Pranking Pandemonium (Louis and Albie) and Shining Stars (Thomas and Abbie) create pranks inside an art gallery.: Public Pranks: Pranking Pandemonium - Sneezing Statue Shining Stars - Picture Breakout; Winners: Shining Stars; Mega Prank: Shining Stars - Cake Off!; Effectors: Shaune Harrison and Simon Tayler
| 6 | "Meteor Strike!" | Ravi Steve | 8 October 2016 |
Dukafundis (Elyssa and Markus) and Very Intelligent Pranksters (Evan and Ashazia) take over a bowling alley.: Public Pranks: Dukafundis - Haunted Alley Very Intelligent Pranksters - Hot Dog Bowler; Winners: Dukafundis; Mega Prank: Dukafundis - Meteor Strike!; Effectors: Marc Reichel, Andy Antoine and Hassan Aziz
| 7 | "Studio Breakdown" | Jason Garbett | 15 October 2016 |
Walking Warriors (Max and Vito) and Team Genius (Yashila and Imelda) take over a busy market to stage their pranks. There's also a prank in a TV studio.: Public Pranks: Walking Warriors - Disgusting Chef Team Genius - Alien Fortune Teller; Winners: Walking Warriors; Mega Prank: Walking Warriors - Studio Breakdown; Effectors: Rob Mayor and Danny Hargreaves
| 8 | "Ninja Academy" | Ravi Steve | 22 October 2016 |
Prank 360 (Sarah and Zahra) and Gladiators (Hadrian and Luke) invade an office building to prank their unsuspecting targets.: Public Pranks: Prank 360 - 180 Office Gladiators - Elec-Trick Wheelchair; Winners: Prank 360; Mega Prank: Prank 360 - Ninja Academy; Effectors: Devon Slack, Marc Reichel and Andy Antoine
| 9 | "Car Disaster" | Jason Garbett | 29 October 2016 |
Prankvengers (Daniel and Matthew) and Dancing Flamingos (Bethany and Kayla) take over a garden centre to prank their unsuspecting targets.: Public Pranks: Prankvengers - Shed Shocker Dancing Flamingos - Bee Attack; Winners: Prankvengers; Mega Prank: Prankvengers - Car Disaster; Effectors: Abbi Collins and Simon Tayler
| 10 | "Double Trouble" | Ravi Steve | 5 November 2016 |
Mystic n' Magic (Grace and Fawn) and Twintastic (Amber and Alyssa) head to a bookshop to stage two magic-themed pranks.: Public Pranks: Mystic n' Magic - Famous Authors Twintastic - Twintastic Power; Winners: Mystic n' Magic; Mega Prank: Mystic n' Magic - Double Trouble; Effectors: Hassan Aziz, Marc Reichel and Andy Antoine
| 11 | "Anti-Gravity Bands" | Ravi Steve | 12 November 2016 |
Prank Devils (Aengus and Luca) and Dancing Divas (Bella and Florrie) head to a local park to stage two wire-work pranks.: Public Pranks: Prank Devils - Hover Boots Dancing Divas - Superhero Skip; Winners: Dancing Divas; Mega Prank: Dancing Divas - Anti-Gravity Bands; Effectors: Danny Hargreaves and Nick Porter
