= Top Elf =

American reality competition

- Genre: Reality competition
- Created by: Mike Duffy; Tim Duffy
- Directed by: Michael Pearlman (2019); Gary Shaffer (2020)
- Starring: Tommy Snider; Samantha Turret
- Country of origin: United States
- Original language: English
- No. of seasons: 2
- No. of episodes: 10

Production
- Executive producers: Mike Duffy; Tim Duffy; Jimmy Fox; Bob Schermerhorn (2019); Lisa Fletcher; Paul J. Medford; Mandel Ilagan; Rob Bagshaw (2020); Stacey Carr (2020)
- Running time: 43–45 minutes
- Production companies: Main Event Media; Ugly Brother Studios; Nickelodeon Productions

Original release
- Network: Nickelodeon
- Release: November 29, 2019 – December 17, 2020

Top Elf is an American reality competition television program that aired on Nickelodeon from November 29, 2019 to December 17, 2020.

== Premise ==
In Top Elf, Santa (Tommy Snider) and Ms. Jingles (Samantha Turret) invite seven civilian "Elf-testants" to the North Pole in a competition to test their skills in a series of holiday-themed challenges. Demonstrating the true spirit of the holidays, the Elf-testants compete to have their wish lists granted—not for themselves, but for someone in their community.

== Production ==
On August 28, 2019, it was announced that Nickelodeon ordered the series from Mike and Tim Duffy of Ugly Brother Studios. On November 18, 2019, it was announced that the program would premiere on November 29, 2019, and would feature Frankie Grande, Amirah Kassem, Peyton List, Alex Wassabi and Pete Wentz as guest judges.

On February 19, 2020, it was announced that Nickelodeon renewed the series for a second season. On November 12, 2020, it was announced that the second season would premiere on November 19, 2020, and would feature Addison Rae, Jay Pharoah, Tori Kelly, Guava Juice and JoJo Siwa as guest judges.

== Episodes ==
=== Series overview ===
Season	Episodes	Originally released	
Season	Episodes	First released	Last released
1	5	November 29, 2019	December 21, 2019
2	5	November 19, 2020	December 17, 2020

=== Season 1 (2019) ===
No. overall	No. in season	Title	Original release date	Prod. code	U.S. viewers (millions)
1	1	"Season's Greetings"	November 29, 2019	101	0.45
2	2	"Unwrapped"	December 6, 2019	102	0.60
3	3	"Teamwork Makes the Tree Work"	December 13, 2019	103	0.59
4	4	"Gingerbread House Party"	December 20, 2019	104	0.46
5	5	"The Grand Finale"	December 21, 2019	105	0.47

=== Season 2 (2020) ===
No. overall	No. in season	Title	Original release date	Prod. code	U.S. viewers (millions)
6	1	"'Tis the Season to Be Top Elf"	November 19, 2020	201	0.23
7	2	"Goody, Goody Gum Drops"	November 26, 2020	202	0.20
8	3	"Super Vest to Impress"	December 3, 2020	203	0.41
9	4	"Elfies and Selfies"	December 10, 2020	204	0.32
10	5	"Who Will Be Top Elf?"	December 17, 2020	205	0.32

== Ratings ==
Viewership and ratings per season of Top Elf
Season	Episodes	First aired		Last aired		Avg. viewers (millions)
Season	Episodes	Date	Viewers (millions)	Date	Viewers (millions)	Avg. viewers (millions)
1	5	November 29, 2019	0.45	December 21, 2019	0.47	0.51
2	5	November 19, 2020	0.23	December 17, 2020	0.32	0.29
