= Unleashed (TV program) =

- Genre: Reality competition
- Directed by: Ivan Dudynsky
- Presented by: Gabriel Iglesias
- Starring: Peyton List; Preacher Lawson; Utkarsh Ambudkar
- Country of origin: United States
- Original language: English
- No. of seasons: 1
- No. of episodes: 10

Production
- Executive producers: Nikki Varhely-Gillingham; Mandel Ilagan; Jennifer Mullin; Joni Day; Jayson Dinsmore; Gabriel Iglesias; Joe Meloche
- Cinematography: Multi-camera
- Running time: 22–24 minutes
- Production companies: Fremantle; Nickelodeon Productions

Original release
- Network: Nickelodeon
- Release: October 22 – December 17, 2020

Unleashed is an American reality competition television program that aired on Nickelodeon from October 22 to December 17, 2020. The program is hosted by Gabriel Iglesias, with judges Peyton List, Preacher Lawson, and Utkarsh Ambudkar.

== Production ==
On October 2, 2020, it was announced that a new animal competition program, Unleashed, would premiere on October 22, 2020. Gabriel Iglesias hosted the program while Peyton List, Preacher Lawson, and Utkarsh Ambudkar served as judges. The program was given a 10-episode order. A sneak peek of the program aired on October 12, 2020.

== Episodes ==
No.	Title	Original release date	Prod. code	U.S. viewers (millions)
1	"We Let the Dogs Out!"	October 22, 2020	101	0.60
2	"Scary Chickens, Rat Tricks & Dog Treats - Oh My!"	October 22, 2020	102	0.43
3	"Got to Be Kitten Me!"	October 29, 2020	103	0.67
4	"We're Why the Chicken Crossed the Road!"	November 5, 2020	104	0.36
5	"Horsing Around!"	November 12, 2020	105	0.41
6	"A Little Birdie Told Us!"	November 19, 2020	106	0.33
7	"I'll Be a Monkey's Patient!"	November 26, 2020	107	0.12
8	"Let's Get Physi-Goat!"	December 3, 2020	108	0.30
9	"Watch Like A Hawk!"	December 10, 2020	109	0.26
10	"Squirrels Just Wanna Have Fun!"	December 17, 2020	110	0.34
