= Super Bowl programming on Nickelodeon =

Television specials

The children's cable television network Nickelodeon has on occasion, produced special programming in-line with its corporate cousin CBS and that network's then forthcoming Super Bowl coverage.

== History ==
=== Nickelodeon Takes Over the Super Bowl (2004) ===
Nickelodeon's first involvement with the National Football League was in 2004. In conjunction with CBS' then upcoming coverage of Super Bowl XXXVIII from Houston on February 1, 2004, CBS aired the hour long special Nickelodeon Takes Over the Super Bowl. Hosted by Brent Popolizio and Candace Bailey from U-Pick Live at the CBS Sports desk, Nickelodeon Takes Over the Super Bowl also featured appearances by CBS Sports reporter Bonnie Bernstein, Drake Bell and Josh Peck from Drake & Josh, Giovonnie Samuels and Jamie Lynn Spears from All That, Romeo Miller from Romeo!, Pick Boy, Cow (Tom Lamberth), and Garbagio from U-Pick Live, Harry Potter stars Rupert Grint and Emma Watson, CBS Sports analysts Marcus Allen, Boomer Esiason, Dan Marino, and Phil Simms, NFL superstars Michael Strahan and Warren Sapp alongside former Guts and Get the Picture host Mike O'Malley (then starring on the sitcom Yes, Dear, which aired on corporate sibling CBS) and finally, an on-stage performance of "My Mic" by Nick Cannon.

=== Nickelodeon's All Access Pass to Super Bowl XLVIII (2014) ===
For Super Bowl XLVIII in 2014, Nickelodeon produced a string of programming across its networks. This included a special edition of TeenNick Top 10, hosted by Nick Cannon and featuring an interview with then New York Giants wide receiver Victor Cruz, an episode of the animated series NFL Rush Zone that featured J. J. Watt of the Houston Texans and Vernon Davis of the San Francisco 49ers, and the Season 2 premiere of the NickMom series Take Me to Your Mother. On February 1, the day before the Super Bowl, Jeff Sutphen, in character as his superhero alter ego Pick Boy, hosted a half-hour special called Nickelodeon's All Access Pass to Super Bowl XLVIII. The special not only covered the activities surrounding Super Bowl week in Times Square but also featured exclusive player interviews as well an interview with the winner of the NFL Play 60 Super Bowl contest, Thomas Brown.

=== Nickelodeon Superstar Slime Showdown at Super Bowl (2017–18) ===
For Super Bowl LI in 2017, Nickelodeon produced another set of programming for its networks. These included a series of interstitials featuring Kel Mitchell from Game Shakers and Breanna Yde from School of Rock highlighting activities at the NFL Experience, and a marathon of sports-themed programming on Nicktoons such as All in with Cam Newton, Crashletes and Jagger Eaton's Mega Life. On February 5, the same day the Super Bowl was held, Nickelodeon aired a one-hour special called The Nickelodeon Superstar Slime Showdown at Super Bowl. Hosted by Nick Cannon, The Nickelodeon Superstar Slime Showdown at Super Bowl also featured appearances by Yde, Jade Pettyjohn and Ricardo Hurtado from School of Rock, and NFL athletes including Andre Johnson, LaDainian Tomlinson, DeMarcus Ware and Wes Welker. The special pitted the athletes against the network's stars in various football-themed challenges, with the winning team being crowned the "Superstar Slime Showdown Champion".

For Super Bowl LII in 2018, Nickelodeon produced another installment of the Superstar Slime Showdown at Super Bowl, with Cannon returning as host. Airing on February 4, the special featured NFL athletes Drew Brees, Stefon Diggs, Todd Gurley, Luke Kuechly, Deion Sanders and DeMarcus Ware, Breanna Yde and Ricardo Hurtado as team captains, and a halftime performance by JoJo Siwa. In addition, interstitials featuring Yde and Hurtado at the Super Bowl Experience and Nickelodeon Universe at the Mall of America were broadcast days leading up to the event.

=== Double Dare at Super Bowl (2019) ===
For Super Bowl LIII in 2019, Nickelodeon aired a special 45-minute episode of the 2018 revival of Double Dare called Double Dare at Super Bowl. Filmed at the Georgia World Congress Center during the Super Bowl Experience, it featured Scarlet Spencer and Dallas Dupree Young from the Nickelodeon series Cousins for Life, and NFL athletes Drew Brees and Russell Wilson playing with kid contestants. The special aired on February 3, and was simulcast on Nickelodeon, TeenNick, and Nicktoons.

=== Nickelodeon Super Duper Super Bowl Pregame Spectacular (2021) ===
Nickelodeon also participated in tie-ins for Super Bowl LV, also televised by CBS. Nickelodeon aired a half-hour special, The Nickelodeon Super Duper Super Bowl Pregame Spectacular, which was hosted by Gabrielle Nevaeh Green and Lex Lumpkin. It featured "Nick-ified" season highlights, and other segments previewing the game. The special premiered on February 5, 2021, and repeated throughout Super Bowl weekend.

Although a full Nickelodeon telecast was not aired (as the Super Bowl was broadcast only by CBS to maximize viewership), CBS and Nickelodeon produced themed content throughout the game for its social media platforms, including video highlights presented by Noah Eagle and Green with similar visual effects to the Wild Card Game broadcast, which were also featured during the main CBS telecast during the halftime show. A special NFL-themed edition of Unfiltered also aired as a segment during the CBS pre-game show.

=== Super Bowl LVIII simulcast (2024) ===
On August 1, 2023, it was announced that Nickelodeon would air a kid-focused simulcast of Super Bowl LVIII from Allegiant Stadium in Paradise, Nevada on February 11, 2024.

== See also ==
- NFL on Nickelodeon
- NFL Slimetime
