= List of NFL on CBS announcers =

NFL on CBS announcers include:

== Current ==
=== Play-by-play ===
- Andrew Catalon: play-by-play (2013–present)
- Spero Dedes: play-by-play (2010–present)
- Ian Eagle: play-by-play (1998–present)
- Kevin Harlan: play-by-play (1998–present)
- Chris Lewis: play-by-play (2023–present) select assignments
- Tom McCarthy: play-by-play (2014–present)
- Beth Mowins: play-by-play (2017–present) select assignments
- Jim Nantz: studio host (1998–2003); play-by-play (1988–1993); lead play-by-play (2004–present)

=== Studio host ===
- James Brown: studio host (2006–present)
- Adam Schein: game break host (2024–present)

=== Studio analysts ===
- Bill Cowher: studio analyst (2007–present)
- Nate Burleson: studio analyst (2017–present); fill-in studio host (2020–2021)
- Russell Wilson: studio analyst (2026–present)
- Kyle Long: The NFL Today+ studio analyst (2025–present); studio analyst (2026–present); analyst (2025) select assignments
- Antonio Pierce: The NFL Today+ studio analyst (2025–present

=== Game analysts ===
- Adam Archuleta: analyst (2013–present)
- Nate Burleson: Nickelodeon analyst (2021–present)
- Trent Green: analyst (2014–present)
- Logan Ryan: analyst (2025–present); The NFL Today+ studio analyst (2025)
- Robert Turbin: analyst (2026–present)
- Ross Tucker: analyst (2023–present)
- Gene Steratore: rules analyst (2018–present)
- J. J. Watt: studio analyst (2023–2024); analyst (2025–present); lead analyst (2026–present)

=== Sideline reporters ===
- Evan Washburn: sideline reporter (2014), #2 sideline reporter (2015–present)
- Tracy Wolfson: lead sideline reporter (2013–present), feature reporter (2013)
- Melanie Collins: sideline reporter (2017), #3 sideline reporter (2018–present)
- Amanda Balionis: sideline reporter (2018–present)
- Tiffany Blackmon: sideline reporter (2023–present)
- AJ Ross: sideline reporter (2018–present), #4 sideline reporter and sideline reporter for the NFL playoffs on Westwood One
- "Young" Dylan Gilmer: Nickelodeon reporter (2022–present)
- Aditi Kinkhabwala: sideline reporter (2022), #5 sideline reporter (2023–present)
- Dylan Schefter: Nickelodeon sideline reporter (2022–present)

==== 2026 broadcaster pairings ====
1. Jim Nantz/J. J. Watt/Tracy Wolfson
2. Ian Eagle/Ross Tucker/Evan Washburn
3. Kevin Harlan/Trent Green/Melanie Collins
4. Andrew Catalon/Logan Ryan/AJ Ross or Emily Proud (week 8)
5. Spero Dedes/Adam Archuleta/Aditi Kinkhabwala
6. Tom McCarthy/Robert Turbin/Tiffany Blackmon
7. Chris Lewis/Luke Kuechly/Amanda Balionis

== Former ==
=== A ===
- Marv Albert: play-by-play (2011–2013)
- George Allen: analyst (1978–1981)
- Marcus Allen: studio analyst (1998), feature reporter (1998–2004)
- Brian Anderson: play-by-play (2014–2016)
- Bruce Arians: analyst (2018)
- Iain Armitage: Nickelodeon rules analyst (2021–2022)
- Jill Arrington: sideline reporter (2000–2002)

=== B ===
- Richard Baldinger: analyst (2004–2006)
- Tiki Barber: analyst (2019–2024)
- Gary Bender: play-by-play (1975–1981; 1986)
- Bonnie Bernstein: sideline reporter (1999–2005); feature reporter (1998, 2004–2005)
- Les Bingaman: analyst (1956–1957)
- Joe Boland: play-by-play (1956–1959)
- Craig Bolerjack: play-by-play (1998–2005)
- Emerson Boozer: analyst (1977)
- Terry Bradshaw: studio analyst (1990–1993); analyst (1984–1989) (1980–1981)
- Tim Brando: play-by-play (1999–2003)
- Tim Brant: play-by-play (1987–1990)
- Terry Brennan (1960–1961)
- Tom Brookshier: analyst (1962) (1966–1980); play-by-play (1981–1986)
- Jim Brown: analyst (1977–1978)
- Timmy Brown: analyst (1973)
- Jack Buck: play-by-play (1964–1974, 1982–1987)
- Steve Beuerlein: analyst (2004–2018)
- Nick Buoniconti: analyst (1976–1978)
- Sherree Burruss: sideline reporter (2020–2021)
- Dick Butkus: studio analyst (1988–1989)
- Dennis Byrd: analyst (1993)

=== C ===
- Joe Campanella (1966)
- Bill Campbell: analyst (1956)
- Tony Canadeo: analyst (1959–1967)
- Charlsie Cantey: studio analyst (1983)
- Mike Carey: rules analyst (2014–2015)
- Herb Carneal: play-by-play (1961–1964)
- Charley Casserly: insider (2006–2012)
- Paul Christman:(1958–1959) (1968–1970)
- Frank Clarke (1969–1973)
- Ken Coleman (1958) (1962–1965)
- George Connor (1958–1968) (1971–1972)
- Bob Costas: play-by-play (1977–1979)
- Don Criqui: play-by-play (1967–1978; 1998–2013)
- Irv Cross: studio analyst (1975–1989); game analyst (1971–1991)
- Randy Cross: studio analyst (1999–2001; game analyst (1989–1993, 2002–2012)

=== D ===
- Stacey Dales: sideline reporter (2015–2016)
- Charles Davis: analyst (2020–2025)
- Jenny Dell: sideline reporter (2014, 2016, 2021)
- Dan Dierdorf: analyst (1985–1986, 1999–2013)
- Mike Ditka: studio analyst (2000–2002)
- John Dockery (1982–1985, 1998)
- Jack Drees (1959–1973)
- Fred Dryer: analyst (1981)
- Jimmy Dudley: analyst (1958)
- Jerry Dunphy: analyst (1956)

=== E ===
- Noah Eagle: Nickelodeon play-by-play (2021–2024)
- Boomer Esiason: studio analyst (2002–2023)
- Rich Eisen: Thursday Night Football host (2014–2017)
- Pete Elliott (1967)
- Mike Emrick (1992–1993)
- Dick Enberg: play-by-play (2000–2009)
- Jamie Erdahl: sideline reporter (2014–2017, 2022)

=== F ===
- Marshall Faulk: Thursday Night Football analyst (2014–2017)
- Bill Fay: analyst (1956–1958)
- Jay Feely: special teams analyst (2015–2024), regular analyst (2017–2024)
- Gary Fencik (1988)
- Joe Foss: analyst (1956–1957)
- Bob Fouts (1956, 1959–1967)
- Dan Fouts: analyst (1988–1993, 2008–2019)

=== G ===
- Roman Gabriel (1978–1979)
- Eddie Gallaher (1958–1964)
- Rich Gannon (2005–2020)
- Fred Gehrke: analyst (1957)
- Phyllis George: studio analyst (1975–1977, 1980–1984)
- Jim Gibbons (1956–1957, 1959–1967)
- Frank Gifford: analyst (1964–1970)
- Jerry Glanville: studio analyst (1999–2001); analyst (2003)
- Frank Glieber: play-by-play (1962–1975) (1977–1984)
- Tony Gonzalez: studio analyst (2014–2016)
- Bailey Goss: analyst (1956–1959)
- Curt Gowdy: play-by-play (1979–1980)
- Michael Grady: sideline reporter (2022)
- Sonny Grandelius (1965–1967)
- Red Grange: play-by-play (1957–1963)
- Jim Gray: reporter (1988–1993)
- Gabrielle Nevaeh Green: Nickelodeon analyst (2021–2022)
- Joe Greene: analyst (1982)
- Amanda Guerra: The NFL Today+ host (2025); sideline reporter (2023–2024)
- Greg Gumbel: studio host (1990–1993, 2004–2005); play-by-play (1988–1989, 2006–2022); lead play-by-play (1998–2003)

=== H ===
- Pat Haden: analyst (1986) (1988–1989)
- Mal Hammack (1967)
- Wayne Hardin (1965)
- Claude Haring: analyst (1956)
- Tom Harmon (1957–1958) (1961)
- Leon Hart: analyst (1958)
- Alex Hawkins (1971–1972) (1975–1977)
- Jim Henderson (1990)
- Jim Hill (1981) (1983–1986) (1993)
- Elroy Hirsch: analyst (1959)
- Paul Hornung: analyst (1975–1979)

=== I ===
- Michael Irvin: Thursday Night Football analyst (2014–2017)

=== J ===
- Craig James: studio analyst (1999–2000), game analyst (2001–2002)
- Dan Jiggetts: analyst (1985–1991, 1993)
- Gus Johnson: play-by-play (1998–2010)
- Daryl Johnston: analyst (2000)
- Brent Jones: studio analyst (1998); analyst (1999–2005)
- Jonathan Jones: insider (2022–2025)
- Sonny Jurgensen: analyst (1975–1980)

=== K ===
- Bob Kelley (1956–1964)
- Dan Kelly (1973–1974)
- Jim Kelly (1982–1984)
- Jayne Kennedy: studio analyst (1978–1980)
- Armen Keteyian: #1 sideline reporter (1998–2003), #2 sideline reporter (2004–2005)
- Gene Kirby: analyst (1956)
- Jerry Kramer (1969)

=== L ===
- Jason La Canfora: insider (2012–2021)
- Warren Lahr (1962–1967)
- Jim Lampley: play-by-play (1987)
- Eddie LeBaron (1966–1971)
- Lee Leonard (1974)
- James Lofton: analyst (2017–2024)
- Johnny Lujack (1957–1961)
- Lex Lumpkin: Nickelodeon reporter (2021)
- Verne Lundquist: play-by-play (1984–1993; 1998–2000)

=== M ===
- Bill Macatee: play-by-play (1999–2013)
- John Madden: analyst (1979–1993)
- Charles Mann (1999–2000)
- Dan Marino: studio analyst (2002–2013)
- Steve Mariucci: Thursday Night Football analyst (2014–2017)
- Tommy Mason (1973)
- Trevor Matich (2001)
- Tom Matte (1976–1978)
- Bill Mazer (1970–1971) (1978)
- Mark May: analyst (1998–2000)
- Jason McCourty: analyst (2023–2025)
- Arch McDonald: analyst (1956–1957)
- Sean McDonough: play-by-play (1991–1993)
- Will McDonough (1986–1989)
- Jim McKay (1957)
- Bill McPeak (1966)
- Al Michaels (1975–1976)
- Matt Millen: analyst (1992–1993)
- Lenny Moore (1968)
- Johnny Morris (1975–1986)
- Jim Morse (1963–1966, 1972)
- Brent Musburger: studio host (1975–1989); play-by-play (1973–1974)
- Andy Musser: sideline reporter (1969–1973)
- Jim Mutscheller (1967)

=== N ===
- Stu Nahan (1966–1967)
- Lindsey Nelson (1966–1981)
- Brad Nessler: play-by-play (1990–1991)
- Ernie Nevers: analyst (1956)

=== O ===
- Pat O'Brien: feature reporter (1983) (1989–1993)
- Merlin Olsen: analyst (1990–1991)

=== P ===
- Van Patrick (1957–1967)
- Don Paul (1965–1967)
- Drew Pearson (1984)
- Lowell Perry (1966)
- Bosh Pritchard (1962–1963)

=== Q ===
- Les Qualey: analyst (1956)

=== R ===
- Beasley Reece: analyst (1998–1999; 2003); sideline reporter (2000–2002)
- Pete Retzlaff (1973–1974)
- Bob Reynolds: analyst (1956–1962)
- John Robinson: analyst (1991–1992)
- Bruce Roberts, studio host (1966–1973)
- Tony Romo: lead analyst (2017–2025)
- Matt Ryan: analyst (2023); studio analyst (2024–2025); The NFL Today+ studio analyst (2025)
- Sam Ryan: feature reporter 2006–2010: Super Bowl XLI sideline reporter
- Tim Ryan: play-by-play (1972) (1977–1980) (1982–1993)

=== S ===
- Byrum Saam: play-by-play (1956–1959)
- Gil Santos
- Deion Sanders studio analyst (2001–2004, 2014–2017) (Thursday Night Football only)
- Johnny Sauer: analyst (1963–1974)
- Chris Schenkel: play-by-play (1956–1964)
- Bart Scott: studio analyst (2014–2016)
- Hal Scott
- Ray Scott: play-by-play (1956–1973)
- Vin Scully: play-by-play (1975–1981)
- George Seifert: studio analyst (1998)
- Brad Sham play-by-play (2004)
- Shannon Sharpe: studio analyst (2004–2014)
- Phil Simms: lead analyst (1998–2016), studio analyst (2017–2023)
- Jim Simpson
- Steve Smith, Sr.: Thursday Night Football analyst (2017)
- Jimmy "The Greek" Snyder: studio analyst (1976–1987)
- Gordy Soltau
- Ken Stabler: analyst (1987–1989)
- George Starke
- Bart Starr: analyst (1973–1974)
- Roger Staubach: analyst (1980–1982)
- Dick Stockton: play-by-play (1978–1993)
- Hank Stram: analyst (1975, 1978–1993)
- Gil Stratton
- Pat Summerall: analyst (1963–1964, 1966–1974); play-by-play (1974–1993)
- Bill Symes: analyst (1956); play-by-play (1957–1958)

=== T ===
- Michele Tafoya: sideline reporter (1998)
- Steve Tasker: analyst (1998–2018)
- Jim Thacker: play-by-play (1977–1978)
- Joe Theismann: analyst (1986–1987)
- Amber Theoharis: Thursday Night Football host (2017)
- Ed Thilenius: play-by-play (1966–1967)
- Chuck Thompson: play-by-play (1956–1959, 1962–1969)
- Spencer Tillman: analyst (2000–2003)
- Clayton Tonnemaker: analyst (1961–1966)
- Joe Tucker: play-by-play (1956–1959, 1962–1967)
- Roger Twibell (1977–1978)

=== U ===
- Johnny Unitas: analyst (1974–1977)

=== V ===
- Norm Van Brocklin: analyst (1967)
- Dick Vermeil: analyst (1983–1987)
- Billy Vessels (1964)
- Lesley Visser: reporter (1989–1993, 2000–2006)

=== W ===
- Wayne Walker: analyst (1973–1977, 1982–1986)
- Justin Walters: sideline reporter (2023) select assignments
- Charlie Waters: analyst (1983)
- Harry Wismer: play-by-play (1956)
- Wes Wise: play-by-play (1960)
- Jack Whitaker: play-by-play (1960–1964, 1968–1973)
- Solomon Wilcots: analyst (2001–2016), postseason sideline reporter (2006–2012)
- Bob Wolff: play-by-play (1959)

=== Z ===
- Steve Zabriskie: play-by-play (1988–1989)

== See also ==
- National Football League on television
