= NFL on Nickelodeon =

Broadcasts of NFL games produced by CBS Sports

- The NFL on Nickelodeon Wild Card logo
- Also known as: The NFL Wild Card Game on Nickelodeon; The Nickelodeon NFL Nickmas Game
- Genre: American football telecasts
- Directed by: Andy Freedman; Suzanne Smith
- Presented by: Noah Eagle; Nate Burleson; Gabrielle Nevaeh Green; Lex Lumpkin; Dylan Gilmer; Iain Armitage; Dylan Schefter; Rob Gronkowski; Marc Summers
- Voices of: Bill Fagerbakke; Tom Kenny; Carolyn Lawrence; Mr. Lawrence; Brady Noon; Micah Abbey; Diana Zermeño; Asher Colton Spence
- Opening theme: SpongeBob SquarePants theme (2021, 2024–2025); Double Dare theme (2021); "Believer" by Imagine Dragons (2021); NFL Slimetime theme (2022-2023); "Posthumus Zone" by E.S. Posthumus
- Country of origin: United States
- Original language: English
- No. of seasons: 4
- No. of episodes: 6

Production
- Executive producers: Sean McManus; Harold Bryant; Shawn Robbins
- Producers: Jonathan Segal; Ken Mack
- Production location: Various NFL stadiums
- Camera setup: Multi-camera
- Running time: 210 minutes or until game ends
- Production companies: National Football League; CBS Sports; Nickelodeon Productions

Original release
- Network: Nickelodeon
- Release: January 10, 2021 – January 11, 2025

Related
- NFL on CBS; NFL Slimetime; Nickelodeon Super Duper Super Bowl Pregame Spectacular; Nickelodeon Takes Over the Super Bowl

The NFL on Nickelodeon is the branding used for broadcasts of National Football League (NFL) games that are produced by CBS Sports, and broadcast on the American pay television channel Nickelodeon. The telecast is a basic simulcast of the CBS television feed, but features different on-screen graphics, different play-by-play announcers, special features and guests, special on-screen effects, and network branding. The telecasts are geared toward children and families, and typically feature characters from Nickelodeon programming such as SpongeBob SquarePants, Dora the Explorer, as well as hosts and correspondents from NFL Slimetime. Since 2020, one or two games each season have been selected for the special airing on Nickelodeon.

The first telecast took place during the playoffs of the 2020 NFL season. Nickelodeon aired a one-time experimental simulcast in coordination with CBS of the Chicago Bears–New Orleans Saints Wild Card game. This marked the first time that a major live sporting event was broadcast on the channel. Following positive reception from media and fans, Nickelodeon announced that the simulcast would return in the 2021 season for a Wild Card playoff game between the San Francisco 49ers and Dallas Cowboys.

In 2022–2023, the simulcast was used for Christmas Day games. Later in the 2023 season, it was utilized for Super Bowl LVIII. The most-recent game on Nickelodeon was a Wild Card game in January 2025.

== History ==
In December 2019, Viacom re-merged with CBS Corporation to form ViacomCBS. To capitalize on the re-merger, CBS announced plans to add content from Nickelodeon to its CBS All Access streaming service. Additionally, the National Football League announced that Nickelodeon would air a youth-specific broadcast of an early 2021 Wild Card playoff game that CBS Sports acquired the rights to, marking the first major live sporting event on the channel. The idea for Nickelodeon to televise an NFL game was that of CBS Sports' chairman Sean McManus. McManus brought the idea up to the league, which was looking to reach younger and diverse audiences. While the network has aired sports-related programming in the past (such as its athletics game show Nickelodeon Guts, and its Kids' Choice Sports awards show), this marked the first live sporting event to ever be televised by Nickelodeon.

McManus explained that the production planned to "respect the integrity of the game", but that there would be features "to make it look and feel very, very different than a CBS broadcast, which it should. I think it's really going to be fun." Coordinating producer Shawn Robbins described the broadcast as being a "Nick-ified", "co-viewing" experience for parents and children, and that it would still "look somewhat the same", as they did not want to "mess with your football and put stuff on if that's going to take away from the viewing experience." The broadcast had the inclusion of Nickelodeon cartoon branding as well as commentary from Nick stars Gabrielle Green and Lex Lumpkin. Emphasis was placed on educating viewers of the rules of football; this included appearances by Sheldon Cooper (as played by Iain Armitage on CBS sitcom Young Sheldon) to explain penalties. Robbins told The New York Times that Green was accidentally sent an 800-page package of game notes that was intended for Tony Romo.

CBS Sports' ad sales team handled the ad sales for both telecasts. While a majority of the advertisements for the Bears-Saints game would be the same across both the CBS and Nickelodeon broadcasts, Nickelodeon aired some different ads more that were tailored to its younger audience, excluding ads for alcohol and sports betting apps.

== Live telecasts ==
=== NFC Wild Card Playoff game – January 10, 2021 ===
Nickelodeon's first live NFL game aired on January 10, 2021, as a special youth-specific presentation of the 2021 Wild Card playoff game between the New Orleans Saints and Chicago Bears. During the week leading up to the game, Madden NFL 21's "The Yard" mode was updated with SpongeBob SquarePants themed content, including a Bikini Bottom-themed "reef-top" stadium, and SpongeBob-themed modifiers. Immediately prior to the game, Nickelodeon aired a sports-themed SpongeBob clip show, The SpongeBob SportsPants Countdown Special, which was hosted by Burleson.

Nickelodeon in correlation with the National Football League, also launched a website with sports betting-like elements such as free-to-play games and risk-free gambling. More specifically, users of the site would get the chance to pick who would win the game, which would in return, compare to the public pick. The user could receive points that could be exchanged for prizes and rewards. The NFL Nick Play website also featured the ability to collect SpongeBob SquarePants and The Loud House-themed content via QR codes.

Denver Broncos linebacker Von Miller was originally supposed to host The SpongeBob SportsPants Countdown Special instead of Nate Burleson, but was not present. It was later revealed on January 15, that Miller was under an unknown criminal investigation in Colorado. A preview of the then-new SpongeBob SquarePants spin-off series, Kamp Koral: SpongeBob's Under Years, was also aired at halftime.

==== Digital on-screen graphics ====
Nickelodeon worked with the agency Elevation to develop the branding and on-air look for the January 10, 2021 broadcast. A trial run was conducted during the Philadelphia Eagles-Green Bay Packers game on December 6, 2020, to test the graphics, animation and filters.

Iain Armitage, in character as Sheldon Cooper from CBS' TV comedy series Young Sheldon appeared over the scoring bug to explain to viewers the rules such as a false start. A giant version of SpongeBob SquarePants appeared between the crossbars during field goal attempts. SpongeBob SquarePants also appeared in player stat graphics to include their "Favorite snack" and "Favorite classic Nick show". Meanwhile, analyst Nate Burleson called the red zone "the money zone", as he drew a dollar bill sign on the cartoon-like graphic.

Nickelodeon's broadcast as a whole, aimed to focus less on stats and more on fun facts about the players—such as a player's favorite flavor of ice cream or even a "tale of the tape" between New Orleans Saints running back Alvin Kamara and Alvin the Chipmunk. Not only that, but Nickelodeon also put important team relationships in terms they feel their audience can understand such as Drew Brees and Taysom Hill of the New Orleans Saints and SpongeBob SquarePants and Patrick Star. Nickelodeon even put up a graphic depicting Patrick Star "trolling" Bears wide receiver Javon Wims after he dropped the ball that would've resulted in a wide-open touchdown. Speaking of Drew Brees, Nate Burleson on the January 10 broadcast compared him to being like the kid at recess who never misses at dodgeball.

For highlight reels, Nickelodeon implemented digital, comic strip-like animation such as white smoke, green slime, blue lightning, players were given superimposed googly eyes and hamburger hats, as well as a dancing Lincoln Loud from The Loud House.

And whenever a player scored a touchdown, two augumented reality green slime-cannons set off on both sides of the endzone or the "slime zone" as Nickelodeon dubbed it, while the "TOUCHDOWN" graphic has been updated, now featuring the team's wordmark preceding a purple football sliding in. Nickelodeon's broadcast also featured pixelated halftime highlights that were presented in an all block graphic style similar to the video game Minecraft.

==== Broadcast incidents ====
Referee Alex Kemp's open microphone caught Chicago Bears wide receiver Cordarrelle Patterson saying "What the fuck?" in reaction to a penalty for unsportsmanlike conduct after he voluntarily ran out of bounds during a punt. Patterson later claimed he did not utter the expletive. At the time, Kemp mistakenly called the penalty on #85, tight end Cole Kmet, instead of Patterson who was #84.

Despite his team's loss and completing only 19 passes for 199 yards, Bears quarterback Mitchell Trubisky won the online voting for the NVP, or Nickelodeon Valuable Player, award with 49% of the votes after podcast host Dan "Big Cat" Katz (Pardon My Take) had led an online campaign with the Twitter hashtag #Mitch4NVP, encouraging viewers to submit multiple votes for Trubisky. He received a trophy, adorned with the Nickelodeon blimp. Chicago defensive end Akiem Hicks and New Orleans defensive end Cameron Jordan finished second and third in voting, respectively.

After volunteering to do so, Saints head coach Sean Payton was slimed after his team's 21–9 victory. A communication disconnect prevented Cameron Jordan from joining Payton in the sliming like sideline reporter Lex Lumpkin tried to do.

=== NFC Wild Card Playoff game – January 16, 2022 ===
On March 18, 2021, Richard Deitsch of The Athletic asked Sean McManus about the future of Nickelodeon-style NFL games. McManus said that there's a section in the new CBS deal regarding alternate telecasts such as the Nick game, but not weekly. On September 1, 2021, it was announced that the Wild Card simulcast would return for the 2021 NFL season. On December 16, 2021, Nickelodeon announced that Noah Eagle, Nate Burleson, and Gabrielle Nevaeh Green would once again call the channel's NFL Wild Card playoff game telecast, which featured the eighth postseason meeting between the San Francisco 49ers and Dallas Cowboys. It was also announced that Dylan Gilmer would replace Lex Lumpkin as the sideline reporter.

During the week leading up to the game, Rugrats and Teenage Mutant Ninja Turtles themed content was added alongside the SpongeBob content in Madden NFL 22's "The Yard" mode. Two days prior to the game, Nickelodeon aired a sports-themed The Loud House clip show, The Loud House Super Sports Special. A new episode of The Loud House served as the game's lead-in, while the first episode of the then-new Nickelodeon series, Warped!, served as the lead-out. A preview of the then-new Paramount+ series, Big Nate, was also aired at halftime.

==== Digital on-screen graphics ====
The network introduced a real-time, augmented reality graphic of a giant slime monster, which would periodically pop up behind the defense.

This particular graphic was created with the help from The Famous Group, who also helped provide the graphic depicting SpongeBob SquarePants' face in the crossbar, and a graphic showing the orange Nickelodeon blimp sliming the field right before the kickoff. While there was a blimp graphic that briefly appeared during the 2021 playoff broadcast, this particular rendition not only cast lifelike shadows on the field, but also adjust to the time of day, and allow cameras to zoom in and out while it's in the camera's frame. The graphics were based on Epic Games' Unreal Engine. This was in contrast to the usage of Adobe After Effects during the previous year's NFL playoff game on Nickelodeon.

Another subtle change is the SpongeBob SquarePants graphic between the crossbar now being able to more instantly react to the kick's result in real-time. And instead of the Minecraft-like "Blockie" characters used to simulate actual formations and routes, three-dimensional models based on the Teenage Mutant Ninja Turtles was used during highlights. Nickelodeon enlisted the services of Beyond Sports to create the animation for said highlights. The "Slime Zone" graphics were also modified to allow for one of Nickelodeon's six dedicated cameras to zoom on one of the slime cannons following a touchdown.

This time around, Sonic the Hedgehog and Tails from Sonic the Hedgehog 2 were also showcased on the broadcast alongside SpongeBob and the titular Teenage Mutant Ninja Turtles from the 2012 TV series. When explaining to Nickelodeon's young viewers the significance of the rivalry between the Dallas Cowboys and San Francisco 49ers, the broadcast used the rivalry between Mr. Krabs and Plankton from SpongeBob SquarePants as an analogy.

The broadcast also featured a brief parody of ESPN's alternate Monday Night Football broadcasts featuring Peyton and Eli Manning. Nickelodeon's version of the "Manningcast" featured Pro Football Hall of Famer Deion Sanders talking to SpongeBob SquarePants and Patrick Star.

==== Broadcast incidents ====
San Francisco tight end George Kittle was heard over an open microphone saying "fuck" late in the second quarter, repeating Cordarrelle Patterson's incident in the previous year's broadcast.

Dallas quarterback Dak Prescott won the online fan voting for NVP, marking the second straight year that the losing team's quarterback received the game's most valuable player award after Chicago's Mitch Trubisky won the inaugural award in 2021.

Coincidentally, referee Alex Kemp, who officiated Nickelodeon's first live NFL game the previous year, was also the referee for this game.

=== NFL on Christmas Day game – December 25, 2022 ===
On May 10, 2022, as part of the NFL's schedule release, it was announced that CBS, Fox, and NBC would carry a tripleheader on Christmas Day. CBS concurrently announced that Nickelodeon would carry an alternate broadcast of its game (billed as the Nickmas game) between the Denver Broncos and Los Angeles Rams, marking its first regular-season broadcast.

On December 6, 2022, Nickelodeon announced that Burleson, Eagle, and Green would return to call the telecast. It was also announced that Gilmer would return as sideline reporter and Patrick Star (voiced by Bill Fagerbakke) would offer live commentary during the game.

During the week leading up to the game, alongside the SpongeBob content in Madden NFL 23's "The Yard" mode, players can take on ten challenges based on moments featuring Nickelodeon NVP winners in the 2021 Wild Card game and the 2021 season and earn two exclusive Nickelodeon NVP cards (both the 2021 Wild Card game and the 2022 Christmas game (token usable on January 3, 2023)) and SpongeBob gear in the "Ultimate Team" mode. A new episode of The Loud House served as the game's lead-in, while a new episode of That Girl Lay Lay served as the lead-out. A preview of the then-new Paw Patrol spin-off series, Rubble & Crew, also aired at halftime.

The network partnered with Silver Spoon for on-screen Christmas graphics, which included slime, snow, and presents being shot out of cannons, a Yeti, and Santa Claus running routes. The on-screen graphics have been updated to match those from the main broadcast on its sister channel, CBS, as part of the network's unified branding. The "TOUCHDOWN" graphic was entirely modified to include an illustration of the player's headshot, in the style of The Loud House, as well as the player's name and jersey number. The first down line is now a candy cane. The customary Nickelodeon graphics also returned, including cartoon characters being beamed on the field, and the Nick blimp flying over SoFi Stadium. Former New England Patriots and Tampa Bay Buccaneers tight end Rob Gronkowski (dressing as an elf, who is also known as Robbie the Elf) appeared in an on-screen graphic to explain to viewers the rules, such as what a holding penalty is.

During the game's broadcast, Patrick Star roasted Broncos quarterback Russell Wilson after Wilson threw an interception to his former Seattle Seahawks teammate and then-current Ram Bobby Wagner. Patrick reacted by saying, "That's not how [Wilson] wanted to cook."

=== NFL on Christmas Day game – December 25, 2023 ===
On the morning of May 11, 2023, as part of the NFL's schedule release, CBS announced that a special Christmas Day game between the Las Vegas Raiders and Kansas City Chiefs would take place at 1 PM ET on CBS and Nickelodeon. This was the second consecutive year that Nickelodeon aired a game with CBS on Christmas Day.

On December 5, 2023, Nickelodeon announced that Burleson and Eagle would return to call the telecast. It was also announced that NFL Slimetime correspondent Dylan Schefter would return as sideline reporter and Donatello (voiced by Micah Abbey) and Raphael (voiced by Brady Noon) would offer live commentary during the game, replacing Green.

During the week leading up to the game, Nickmas-themed rewards were offered in four Gamefam games on Roblox. A preview of the then-new Nicktoon, Rock Paper Scissors, aired at halftime.

Unlike the previous broadcast, the "TOUCHDOWN" graphic is not used. However, all other graphics remain unchanged. Furthermore, the score bug can be relocated to the bottom right corner of the screen during segments featuring the commentary team in the bottom left corner.

=== Super Bowl LVIII – February 11, 2024 ===
On August 1, 2023, CBS Sports announced that it would carry a simulcast of Super Bowl LVIII on Nickelodeon on February 11, 2024, in addition to the Nickmas game; this marked the first time that an alternate broadcast was produced for a Super Bowl game.

Billed as Super Bowl LVIII: Live from Bikini Bottom, the broadcast featured new augmented reality effects with a SpongeBob SquarePants theme. Burleson and Eagle returned to call the telecast. It was also announced that Gilmer and Schefter would both return as sideline reporters and SpongeBob SquarePants (voiced by Tom Kenny), Sandy Cheeks (voiced by Carolyn Lawrence) and Larry the Lobster (voiced by Mr. Lawrence), in addition to Patrick (voiced by Fagerbakke), would offer live commentary during the game. A 3D animated version of the "Sweet Victory" scene from the SpongeBob SquarePants episode "Band Geeks" was featured during the start of the broadcast. As cross-promotion, an episode of NFL Slimetime also aired on CBS as part of its pre-game programming for the game.

Most of the commercials from the main broadcast were seen during the Nickelodeon broadcast as well, aside from those for products and services (such as alcohol, sports betting, and R-rated films) that are inappropriate for a youth audience. As substitutes, Paramount Global sold approximately 15 spots specific to the Nickelodeon broadcast, charging around $200,000 to $300,000 for a 30-second commercial (in comparison to $6.5 to $7 million for a commercial on the CBS broadcast). Paramount also offered brand integration with other surrounding programming and Nickelodeon personalities.

CBS Sports introduced an updated score bug as part of its current graphics package during the main broadcast, while Nickelodeon opted to continue using the score bug from the previous two broadcasts. This time, the graphics were based on SpongeBob SquarePants. Dora Márquez (voiced by Diana Zermeño) and Boots (voiced by Asher Colton Spence) from the Dora reboot series. explained penalties. The "TOUCHDOWN" graphic featured a 3D rendition of SpongeBob's hands forming the "imagination rainbow," a recurring feature from the "Best Play Ever" segment in NFL Slimetime. The rainbow was also used on the first down line, now adorned with the exclamation "BEST FIRST DOWN EVER!" and featuring details mirroring SpongeBob's pineapple house, complete with bubbles. Alongside, the line of scrimmage features a twisted blue line with kelp grass.

=== AFC Wild Card Playoff game – January 11, 2025 ===
In August 2024, CBS announced that Nickelodeon would carry one of the two Wild Card games that CBS has the rights to during the 2024–25 NFL playoffs. After the Wild Card schedule was set, CBS announced that the simulcast would air for the Los Angeles Chargers-Houston Texans game on January 11, 2025. Noah Eagle did not return for this iteration, with Burleson instead sharing a three-man booth with SpongeBob SquarePants and Patrick Star, while Sandy Cheeks and Dylan Schefter served as sideline reporters. Dora was utilized to explain the rules and penalty calls to viewers. Several other past and present Nickelodeon characters made cameo appearances such as CatDog, who acted as the chain crew. Original host of the network's Double Dare game show Marc Summers also reported on the game. An exclusive preview of Henry Danger: The Movie aired during halftime, and the first episode of the then-new Nickelodeon series The Thundermans: Undercover served as the lead-out.

The graphics from the previous telecast were retained. Furthermore, the titular character of CatDog is shown grabbing the line of scrimmage and the first down line in place of the traditional arrow graphic.

This game received significant online coverage as, during the broadcast, Chargers head coach Jim Harbaugh was "swallowed" by the Dirty Bubble with his Chargers leading 6–0 in the second quarter. After this incident, the Chargers were outscored 32–6, leading to some fans seeing it as an omen.

== List of televised games ==
Season	Away team	Score	Home team	Date	Kickoff (ET / UTC–5)	NVP	Notes
2020	Chicago Bears	9–21	New Orleans Saints	January 10, 2021	4:40 p.m.	Mitchell Trubisky (QB, Chicago)	Wild Card Weekend playoff game
2021	San Francisco 49ers	23–17	Dallas Cowboys	January 16, 2022	4:40 p.m.	Dak Prescott (QB, Dallas)	Super Wild Card weekend playoff game
2022	Denver Broncos	14–51	Los Angeles Rams	December 25, 2022	4:36 p.m.	Baker Mayfield (QB, Los Angeles)	Christmas Day game
2023	Las Vegas Raiders	20–14	Kansas City Chiefs	December 25, 2023	1:00 p.m.	Bilal Nichols (DT, Las Vegas)	Christmas Day game
2023	San Francisco 49ers	22–25 (OT)	Kansas City Chiefs	February 11, 2024	6:30 p.m.	Patrick Mahomes (QB, Kansas City)	Super Bowl LVIII, first overtime game in package history
2024	Los Angeles Chargers	12–32	Houston Texans	January 11, 2025	4:30 p.m.	Joe Mixon (RB, Houston)	Wild Card Weekend playoff game

== On-air staff ==
The January 10, 2021 broadcast, between the Chicago Bears and New Orleans Saints, featured All That cast members Gabrielle Nevaeh Green and Lex Lumpkin joining Noah Eagle (son of CBS announcer Ian Eagle and a Los Angeles Clippers broadcaster) and Nate Burleson from The NFL Today on the announcing team.

While Noah Eagle was tasked with describing the play-by-play action, and Nate Burleson was there to break down the more complicated aspects of football into understandable terms, 15 year old Gabrielle Nevaeh Green was there to offer insights and asks questions as a stand-in for young viewers unfamiliar with the sport. During the January 10 telecast, the crew tried to explain to viewers the play clock's importance, why third down plays are crucial, and the meaning of what a catch actually is.

For the January 16, 2022 broadcast, the booth stayed largely the same, however, Dylan Gilmer (of the Nickelodeon series Tyler Perry's Young Dylan) would replace Lumpkin as the sideline reporter.

For the December 25, 2022 broadcast between the Los Angeles Rams and Denver Broncos from SoFi Stadium in Inglewood, California, Dylan Schefter (the daughter of ESPN reporter, Adam Schefter and contributor to Nickelodeon's NFL Slimetime) served as the sideline reporter. Following the game, Schefter interviewed the game's Nickelodeon Valuable Player Award winner, Rams quarterback Baker Mayfield. The Christmas Day 2022 telecast also featured live commentary by actor Bill Fagerbakke in character as Patrick Star from SpongeBob SquarePants. Fagerbakke, a former Idaho Vandals football defensive lineman whose previous character Michael "Dauber" Dybinski (an assistant football coach from the sitcom Coach) had served as the inspiration for Patrick, returned for the Super Bowl LVIII broadcast, paired with his co-star Tom Kenny (an admitted football novice) as SpongeBob, with both appearing as their characters via motion capture. Kenny and Fagerbakke were given free rein to improvise in character, which required Fagerbakke to dial back some of his football knowledge but also allowed him and Kenny to make jokes that the children's audience would not likely understand, under the premise that the two characters were "knuckleheads;" Kenny recalled after the game a particular joke about Leonardo DiCaprio's dating life, also noting that he had unintentionally called back to a previous unrelated SpongeBob joke around the number 25.

== Ratings ==
The January 10, 2021 broadcast on Nickelodeon drew approximately 2 million viewers. This was a 245% increase from the previous year's time slot. According to Nickelodeon, it was the most-watched program among total viewers in nearly four years. Combined with the roughly 30 million viewers who watched the Saints-Bears game on CBS, then approximately 30.653 million viewers watched in total. This was the biggest audience that CBS received for a Sunday wild card playoff game since 2014.

The January 16, 2022 broadcast on Nickelodeon drew approximately 1.3 million viewers. Combined with the 40 million viewers who watched the 49ers-Cowboys game on CBS, then approximately 41.496 million viewers watched in total. This was the biggest audience that any television network received for a Sunday wild card playoff game since 2015. That figure was 35% up from the same window from the previous year. According to CBS Sports, it was the most-streamed non-Super Bowl NFL game ever on Paramount+.

The December 25, 2022 broadcast on Nickelodeon drew approximately 900,000 viewers. This was a 400% increase over the previous year's Christmas Day time slot, as well as the highest-rated Christmas Day telecast since 2016, with approximately 2.6 million viewers watching in full or in part. Combined with the roughly 22 million who watched the Broncos-Rams game on CBS, then approximately 22.574 million viewers watched in total. Despite that figure being down from both the Christmas and equivalent Sunday windows the previous year, it was the largest Christmas audience for CBS.

The December 25, 2023 broadcast on Nickelodeon drew approximately 900,000 viewers. This was the most-watched early afternoon program on Christmas Day in ten years. Combined with the 28 million who watched the Raiders-Chiefs game on CBS, then approximately 29.171 million viewers watched in total, peaking at around 37.163 million. This was a 29% increase over the previous year's game. According to CBS Sports, this not only marked it as the largest Christmas Day audience for CBS, but also the biggest audience for an NFL Christmas Day game since 1989.

The Super Bowl broadcast on February 11, 2024, drew approximately 1.2 million viewers. Combined with the 120 million who watched the 49ers–Chiefs game on CBS, and the 2.3 million on Univision, then approximately 123.714 million viewers watched in total. This was a 7% increase over the previous year's game. According to CBS Sports, it was the most-streamed Super Bowl ever on Paramount+.

== Reception ==
According to a poll conducted by Morning Consult, more than 70% of parents said they would watch a game like that with kids after showing them a one-minute clip of highlights to give them a sense of Nickelodeon's broadcast. Two-thirds said that Alphas would enjoy the Nickelodeon broadcast more than the traditional version on CBS.

Reaction on social media to Nickelodeon's telecast of the Chicago Bears-New Orleans Saints playoff game on January 11 was mostly positive, with the non-targeted adult audience applauding the fun the network was having.

Phil Rosenthal of the Chicago Tribune wrote that as an alternative to CBS' standard coverage with Jim Nantz and Tony Romo on the call, Nickelodeon did a nice job helping educate youngsters about pro football and brighten a not-so-exciting playoff game between the Saints and Bears. As for the commentating crew, Rosenthal said that Nickelodeon stars Lex Lumpkin and Gabrielle Nevaeh Green were good company and sweetly genuine despite their scripted material being hit or miss. Meanwhile, Rosenthal praised the work of play-by-play announcer Noah Eagle and analyst Nate Burleson, who according to Rosenthal, managed to keep things light all the while, explaining what was happening in the game and what it meant. Rosenthal also summarized that while the sheer novelty of Nickelodeon's animation and special effects faded, it never vanished and that it was overall, wonderfully goofy.

Former St. Louis Rams quarterback Kurt Warner wrote on Twitter that his 31-year-old son Zach, who suffered a traumatic brain injury at four months old and is legally blind, had never sat and watched a football game with him until Nickelodeon's broadcast of the Saints-Bears game on January 10.

=== Criticism ===
The announcement of Nickelodeon broadcasting its first-ever NFL game was not without skepticism and concern, especially in regards to how or if the network would confront the realities of playing such a brutal sport and the risks of sustaining brain trauma for its young audience. During the January 12 broadcast, Christopher Nowinski, co-founder and CEO of the Concussion Legacy Foundation, co-founder of the Boston University CTE Center said on Twitter "That'll get kids killed." in reaction to analyst Nate Burleson comparing New Orleans Saints quarterback Taysom Hill hitting his head to scraping your knee at recess.

Another concern was raised regarding whether or not Nickelodeon's website, NFL Nick Play, which created and targeted printable "pick'em sheets" for children to select winners of that week's NFL games, was appropriate. Critics have argued that something like this is ingraining betting habits at a young age. NFL Nick Play also includes little quizzes on the different positions in football, information on how those positions work, and how the game plays out.

Praveen Nair of the UCSD Guardian said that it was frustrating that the Nickelodeon broadcast cut to the commentators for the couple minutes after Bears wide receiver Anthony Miller was ejected for punching Saints safety C. J. Gardner-Johnson in the face without explaining what was happening on the field.

== Shoulder programming ==
=== Nickelodeon Takes Over the Super Bowl (2004) ===
Nickelodeon's first involvement with the National Football League was in 2004. In conjunction with CBS' then upcoming coverage of Super Bowl XXXVIII from Houston on February 1, 2004, CBS aired the hour long special Nickelodeon Takes Over the Super Bowl.

=== Nickelodeon Super Duper Super Bowl Pregame Spectacular (2021) ===
Nickelodeon also participated in tie-ins for Super Bowl LV, also televised by CBS. Nickelodeon aired a half-hour special, The Nickelodeon Super Duper Super Bowl Pregame Spectacular, which was hosted by Gabrielle Nevaeh Green and Lex Lumpkin.

=== NFL Slimetime ===
On September 10, 2021, ViacomCBS announced that it would air a weekly NFL series on Nickelodeon and Paramount+, NFL Slimetime, hosted by Nate Burleson and Dylan Gilmer. It began airing on September 15, and would air Wednesdays at 7 p.m. throughout the NFL season.
