= NFL Slimetime =

Weekly Nickelodeon sports show

- Genre: Sports
- Written by: Shawn Robbins
- Directed by: Bryan Kosowski; Bob Matina; Suzanne Smith
- Presented by: Nate Burleson; Dylan Gilmer
- Starring: Dylan Schefter; George Johnston IV; Mia Burleson; Wolfgang Schaeffer
- Voices of: Asher Bishop; Bentley Griffin; Ben Giroux; Diana Zermeño; Carolyn Lawrence
- Country of origin: United States
- Original language: English
- No. of seasons: 5
- No. of episodes: 120

Production
- Executive producers: Jana Blumenthal; Ashley Kaplan; Paul J. Medford; Shawn Robbins; Luke Wahl
- Camera setup: Multi-camera
- Running time: 21 minutes
- Production companies: CBS Sports; Nickelodeon Productions

Original release
- Network: Nickelodeon
- Release: September 15, 2021 – present

Related
- NFL on Nickelodeon

NFL Slimetime is an American weekly television sports show that premiered on Nickelodeon on September 15, 2021. The show focuses on the National Football League (NFL), and airs throughout the NFL season.

The fifth season of NFL Slimetime aired September 2025–February 2026, covering the 2025 NFL season.

== Production ==
On September 10, 2021, ViacomCBS announced that it would air a weekly NFL series on Nickelodeon and Paramount+, NFL Slimetime, hosted by Nate Burleson and Dylan Gilmer (from the Nickelodeon series Tyler Perry's Young Dylan).

On August 31, 2022, it was announced that the series was renewed for a second season, which premiered on September 14, 2022.

On May 11, 2023, it was announced that the series was renewed for a third season, which premiered on September 6, 2023, along with the announcement of a second Christmas game to air on Christmas Day 2023.

Nickelodeon teamed with CBS to produce the first Super Bowl alternate broadcast during Super Bowl LVIII on February 11, 2024, billed as Super Bowl LVIII: Live from Bikini Bottom. Two Super Bowl preview episodes were produced for NFL Slimetime to coincide with Nickelodeon's alternate broadcast. A fourth season of the series premiered on September 11, 2024.

== Format ==
NFL Slimetime features highlights and game footage that recaps the previous week's NFL action. Just like with Nickelodeon's first live NFL telecast on January 10, 2021 (the NFC Wild Card playoff game between the Chicago Bears and New Orleans Saints), these highlights are flavored with digital, comic strip-like animation such as white smoke, green slime, and blue lightning. Players were given superimposed googly eyes and hamburger hats, with the best play of the week being featured in a segment called "Best Play Ever". Other recurring segments include Dylan Schefter (the daughter of ESPN NFL reporter Adam Schefter) interviewing one particular player each week and commentary by George Johnston IV in a segment called "George Knows Football".

For the 2021 season, NFL Slimetime featured a "Fantasy Showdown" segment, where each week, a new celebrity challenged Burleson and Gilmer to a game of fantasy football. For the 2022 season, the "Fantasy Showdown" segment was replaced by "Celebrity Pick Party", keeping the same format as "Fantasy Showdown", but instead of picking players to form a team, the celebrity and Team Slimetime will pick winners from the different games each week. The weekly winner of "Celebrity Pick Party" reserved the right to wear the "Slime Chain", an oversized NFL Slimetime logo studded in colored rhinestones. "Celebrity Pick Party" returned for the 2023 season, but with a new format. This time, instead of a head-to-head matchup, Burleson and Gilmer, joined by the weekly celebrity guest picker, picked a game from the weekly lineup. Those who made a correct pick reserves the right to wear the "Slime Chain", while those who made an incorrect pick were slimed at the end of the show. In the event that everyone made a correct pick, a surprise sliming would occur.

== NVP Award ==
Following Nickelodeon's first live NFL broadcast, the network brought back the NVP award for each episode, based on a player's performance the previous week and announced by Lincoln Loud (voiced by Asher Bishop, then Bentley Griffin, and portrayed by Wolfgang Schaeffer (from The Really Loud House (Note: Wolfgang Schaeffer's portrayal as Lincoln Loud was to promote A Loud House Christmas, which premiered on Nickelodeon on November 26, 2021 and was released on Paramount+ earlier that day.)) in Week 12 in 2021), the main protagonist of The Loud House. Starting with the Week 11 episode during the 2022 season, Lincoln Loud was replaced by Nate Wright (voiced by Ben Giroux), from the Paramount+ series Big Nate. Lincoln Loud briefly returned as the NVP announcer for the Pro Bowl, but using the same voice over as Week 4 and slightly changing the accompanying animation. Starting with the Week 1 episode from the 2024 season, Nate was replaced with Dora Márquez (voiced by Diana Zermeño), from the Dora reboot series. Starting with the Week 1 episode from the 2025 season, Dora was replaced with Sandy Cheeks (voiced by Carolyn Lawrence) from SpongeBob SquarePants.

Kyler Murray was the first winner of the weekly NVP. Other winners during the 2021 season have included the participating quarterbacks in Super Bowl LV, Tom Brady and Patrick Mahomes, and Justin Tucker, whose record-setting 66-yard field goal led the Baltimore Ravens to victory in Week 3.

=== 2021 season ===
Week	Winner	Position	Team	Stats
1	Kyler Murray	QB	Arizona	21/32, 289 yards, 4 TD, 1 INT; 20 rushing yards, 1 TD
2	Tom Brady	QB	Tampa Bay	24/36, 276 yards, 5 TD; 6 rushing yards
3	Justin Tucker	K	Baltimore	4 FGM, 1 XPM, NFL record walk-off 66-yard field goal
4	Dak Prescott	QB	Dallas	14/22, 188 yards, 4 TD, 35 yards
5	Josh Allen	QB	Buffalo	15/26, 315 yards, 3 TD; 59 rushing yards, 1 TD
6	Derrick Henry	RB	Tennessee	143 yards, 3 TD
7	Ja'Marr Chase	WR	Cincinnati	8 receptions, 201 yards, 1 TD
8	Mike White	QB	NY Jets	37/45, 405 yards, 3 TD, 2 INT
9	Josh Hines-Allen	DE/LB	Jacksonville	8 solo tackles, 2 TFL, 1 sack, 1 INT, 1 pass deflection, 1 fumble recovery
10	Patrick Mahomes	QB	Kansas City	35/50, 406 yards, 5 TD
11	Jonathan Taylor	RB	Indianapolis	185 yards, 4 TD, 3 receptions, 19 yards, 1 TD
12	Leonard Fournette	RB	Tampa Bay	100 yards, 3 TD, 7 receptions; 31 rushing yards, 1 TD
13	Justin Herbert	QB	LA Chargers	26/35, 317 yards, 3 TD, 1 INT; 6 rushing yards
14	George Kittle	TE	San Francisco	13 receptions, 151 yards, 1 TD
15	Christian Wilkins	DE	Miami	7 total tackles, 1 TFL, 1 pass deflection, 1 reception, 1 receiving yard, 1 TD
16	Joe Burrow	QB	Cincinnati	37/45, 525 yards, 4 TD, 11 yards
17	Ja'Marr Chase	WR	Cincinnati	11 receptions, 266 yards, 3 TD
18	Deebo Samuel	WR	San Francisco	4 receptions, 95 yards, 45 yards, 1 TD, 1/1, 24 yards, 1 TD
WC	Bills Offense		Buffalo	47 points scored, 7 touchdowns scored on 7 offensive drives
DIV	Patrick Mahomes	QB	Kansas City	33/44, 378 yards, 3 TD, 69 yards, 1 TD, led game-tying drive to end regulation, and walk-off, AFC Championship Game berth-clinching touchdown drive in overtime
CONF	Evan McPherson	K	Cincinnati	4 FGM, 1 XPM, walk-off 31-yard field goal to send Bengals to Super Bowl LVI
PRO	Joe Burrow	QB	Cincinnati	NVP of NVPs
LVI	Cooper Kupp	WR	LA Rams	8 receptions, 92 yards, 2 TD, 7 yards, Super Bowl MVP

=== 2022 season ===
Week	Winner	Position	Team	Stats
1	Justin Jefferson	WR	Minnesota	9 receptions, 184 yards, 2 TD
2	Tua Tagovailoa	QB	Miami	36/50, 469 yards, 6 TD
3	Lamar Jackson	QB	Baltimore	18/29, 325 yards, 4 TD; 107 rushing yards, 1 TD
4	Austin Ekeler	RB	LA Chargers	60 yards, 2 TD; 6 receptions, 49 yards, 1 TD
5	Taysom Hill	TE	New Orleans	112 yards, 3 TD; 1/1, 22 yards, 1 TD
6	Quinnen Williams	DT	NY Jets	5 total tackles, 2 TFL, 2 sacks, 1 forced fumble, 1 blocked field goal
7	Joe Burrow	QB	Cincinnati	34/42, 481 yards, 3 TD; 20 rushing yards, 1 TD
8	A. J. Brown	WR	Philadelphia	6 receptions, 156 yards, 3 TD
9	Lions Defense		Detroit	9 points allowed, 3 INT, 1 sack
10	Jonathan Taylor	RB	Indianapolis	147 yards, 1 TD; 2 receptions, 16 yards
11	Travis Kelce	TE	Kansas City	6 receptions, 115 yards, 3 TD
12	Josh Jacobs	RB	Las Vegas	229 yards, 2 TD; 6 receptions, 74 yards
13	49ers Defense		San Francisco	17 points allowed, 3 sacks, 3 INT, 1 fumble recovery, 1 TD
14	Baker Mayfield	QB	LA Rams	22/35, 230 yards, game-winning TD pass; 10 rushing yards
15	Jalen Hurts	QB	Philadelphia	22/37, 315 yards, 61 yards, 3 TD
16	Patrick Mahomes	QB	Kansas City	16/28, 224 yards, 2 TD; 8 rushing yards, 1 TD
17	—	—	—	Award Not Given (Note: Nickelodeon pre-empted the Week 17 recap scheduled for January 4, 2023, following Damar Hamlin's injury on Monday Night Football two days earlier.)
18	Nyheim Hines	KR	Buffalo	4 kick returns, 235 return yards, 2 TD
WC	Daniel Jones	QB	NY Giants	24/35, 301 yards, 2 TD; 78 rushing yards
DIV	Travis Kelce	TE	Kansas City	14 receptions, 98 yards, 2 TD
CONF	Miles Sanders	RB	Philadelphia	42 yards, 2 TD; 1 reception, 3 yards
PRO	Austin Ekeler	RB	LA Chargers	NVP of NVPs
LVII	Patrick Mahomes	QB	Kansas City	21/27, 182 yards, 3 TD, 44 yards, Super Bowl MVP

=== 2023 season ===
Week	Winner	Position	Team	Stats
PRE (Note: This was awarded based on their performance throughout the preseason, consisting of the Pro Football Hall of Fame Game and a three-week schedule of exhibition games.)	Deuce Vaughn	RB	Dallas	64 yards, 2 TD
1	Tyreek Hill	WR	Miami	11 receptions, 215 yards, 2 TD
2	Mike Evans	WR	Tampa Bay	6 receptions, 171 yards, 1 TD
3	Keenan Allen	WR	LA Chargers	18 receptions, 215 yards; 1/1, 49 yards, 1 TD
4	Christian McCaffrey	RB	San Francisco	106 yards, 3 TD; 7 receptions, 71 yards, 1 TD
5	D. J. Moore	WR	Chicago	8 receptions, 230 yards, 3 TD
6	Dan Campbell	HC	Detroit	NVC, 5–1 record
7	Myles Garrett	DE	Cleveland	9 total tackles, 1 TFL, 1 pass deflection, 2 sacks, 2 forced fumbles, 1 blocked field goal
8	Will Levis	QB	Tennessee	19/29, 238 yards, 4 TD; 11 rushing yards
9	Josh Dobbs	QB	Minnesota	20/30, 158 yards, 2 TD; 66 rushing yards, 1 TD
10	C. J. Stroud	QB	Houston	23/39, 356 yards, 1 TD; 8 rushing yards, 1 TD
11	Trevor Lawrence	QB	Jacksonville	24/32, 262 yards, 2 TD; 17 rushing yards, 2 TD
12	DaRon Bland	CB	Dallas	10 total tackles, 1 pass deflection, 1 INT, 1 TD
13	Gardner Minshew	QB	Indianapolis	26/42, 312 yards, 2 TD; 2 rushing yards
14	Lamar Jackson	QB	Baltimore	24/43, 316 yards, 3 TD; 70 rushing yards
15	Baker Mayfield	QB	Tampa Bay	22/28, 381 yards, 4 TD
16	Amari Cooper	WR	Cleveland	11 receptions, 265 yards, 2 TD
17	Kyren Williams	RB	LA Rams	87 yards, 3 TD; 2 receptions, 14 yards
18	Jordan Love	QB	Green Bay	27/32, 316 yards, 2 TD
WC	Josh Allen	QB	Buffalo	21/30, 203 yards, 3 TD; 74 rushing yards, 1 TD
DIV	Travis Kelce	TE	Kansas City	5 receptions, 75 yards, 2 TD
CONF	Christian McCaffrey	RB	San Francisco	90 yards, 2 TD; 4 receptions, 42 yards
PRO	Gardner Minshew	QB	Indianapolis	NVP of NVPs
LVIII (Note: This was previously awarded at the end of Nickelodeon's broadcast of the game, as voted by viewers.)	Patrick Mahomes	QB	Kansas City	34/46, 333 yards, 2 TD, 1 INT, 66 yards, Super Bowl MVP

=== 2024 season ===
Week	Winner	Position	Team	Stats
1	Saquon Barkley	RB	Philadelphia	109 yards, 2 TD; 2 receptions, 23 yards, 1 TD
2	Marvin Harrison Jr.	WR	Arizona	4 receptions, 130 yards, 2 TD
3	Sam Darnold	QB	Minnesota	17/28, 181 yards, 4 TD
4	Jayden Daniels	QB	Washington	26/30, 233 yards, 1 TD; 47 rushing yards, 1 TD
5	Kirk Cousins	QB	Atlanta	42/58, 509 yards, 4 TD
6	Jordan Love	QB	Green Bay	22/32, 258 yards, 4 TD, 1 INT; 13 rushing yards
7	Kenneth Walker III	RB	Seattle	69 yards, 1 TD; 2 receptions, 24 yards, 1 TD
8	Jameis Winston	QB	Cleveland	27/41, 334 yards, 3 TD; 2 rushing yards
9	Zay Flowers	WR	Baltimore	5 receptions, 127 yards, 2 TD
10	Brock Purdy	QB	San Francisco	25/36, 353 yards, 2 TD; 17 rushing yards
11	David Montgomery; Jahmyr Gibbs	RB	Detroit	First ever NVP awarded to more than 1 player
12	Saquon Barkley	RB	Philadelphia	255 yards, 2 TD; 4 receptions, 47 yards
13	Russell Wilson	QB	Pittsburgh	29/38, 414 yards, 3 TD, 1 INT; 3 rushing yards
14	Puka Nacua	WR	LA Rams	12 receptions, 162 yards, 1 TD; 16 rushing yards, 1 TD
15	Josh Allen	QB	Buffalo	23/34, 362 yards, 2 TD; 68 rushing yards, 2 TD
16	Jonathan Taylor	RB	Indianapolis	218 yards, 3 TD
17	Joe Burrow	QB	Cincinnati	39/49, 412 yards, 3 TD; 25 rushing yards, 1 TD
18	Bo Nix	QB	Denver	26/29, 321 yards, 4 TD; 47 rushing yards
WC	Derrick Henry	RB	Baltimore	186 yards, 2 TD
DIV	Jayden Daniels	QB	Washington	22/31, 299 yards, 2 TD; 51 rushing yards
CONF	Patrick Mahomes	QB	Kansas City	18/26, 245 yards, 1 TD; 43 rushing yards, 2 TD
PRO	Saquon Barkley	RB	Philadelphia	NVP of NVPs
LIX	Cooper DeJean	CB	Philadelphia	3 tackles, 1 pass deflection, 1 INT, 1 TD

=== 2025 season ===
Week	Winner	Position	Team	Stats
1	Daniel Jones	QB	Indianapolis	22/29, 272 yards, 1 TD, 26 rushing yards, 2 TD
2	Brandon Aubrey	K	Dallas	4-for-4 FG, 4-for-4 PAT; game-tying 64-yard FG at end of regulation, 46-yard GW FG in overtime
3	Isaiah Rodgers	CB	Minnesota	3 tackles, 2 pass deflections, 1 INT, 2 FF, 2 TD
4	Jaxson Dart	QB	NY Giants	13/20, 111 passing yards, 1 TD, 54 rushing yards, 1 TD
5	Rico Dowdle	RB	Carolina	206 rushing yards, 1 rushing TD, 3 receptions, 28 receiving yards
6	Cam Skattebo	RB	NY Giants	98 rushing yards, 3 rushing TD, 2 receptions, 12 receiving yards
7	Bo Nix	QB	Denver	27/50, 279 yards, 2 TD, 48 rushing yards, 2 rushing TDs
8	James Cook	RB	Buffalo	19 carries, 216 yards, 2 TD
9	Colston Loveland	TE	Chicago	6 receptions, 118 yards, 2 TD
10	Tyrice Knight; DeMarcus Lawrence	LB	Seattle	Knight forced 2 fumbles, both were recovered by Lawrence and returned for TDs
11	TreVeyon Henderson	RB	New England	62 rushing yards, 2 rushing TDs, 5 receptions, 31 receiving yards, 1 receiving TD
12	Myles Garrett	DE	Cleveland	4 tackles, 1 assist, 4 TFL, 3 sacks, 2 forced fumbles
13	Dontayvion Wicks	WR	Green Bay	6 receptions, 94 receiving yards; 2 TDs, 1 carry, 6 rushing yards
14	Matthew Stafford	QB	LA Rams	22/31, 281 yards, 3 TD
15	Travis Etienne Jr.	RB	Jacksonville	12 carries, 32 rushing yards; 4 receptions, 73 receiving yards, 3 receiving TDs
16	Jaylen Warren	RB	Pittsburgh	14 carries, 143 yards, 2 TD; 2 receptions, 8 receiving yards
17	Derrick Henry	RB	Baltimore	36 carries, 216 yards, 4 TD
18	Mitchell Trubisky	QB	Buffalo	22/29, 259 passing yards, 4 TD, 5 rushing yards
WC	Caleb Williams	QB	Chicago	24/48, 361 yards, 2 TD, 2 INT; 20 rushing yards
DIV	Kenneth Walker III	RB	Seattle	19 carries, 116 yards, 3 TD; 3 receptions, 29 receiving yards
CONF	Jaxon Smith-Njigba	WR	Seattle	10 receptions, 153 yards, 1 TD
PRO	Myles Garrett	DE	Cleveland	NVP of NVPs
LX (Note: Announced without any nomination selections, making it a unanimous decision.)	Jason Myers	K	Seattle	5/5 FG, 2/2 PAT

=== 2026 season ===
For 2026, the award was presented in conjunction with a new digital series titled Nickelodeon Explains the NFL.

Week	Winner	Position	Team	Stats
1	D'Andre Swift	RB	Chicago	18 carries, 124 yards, 3 TD; 1 reception, 10 yards
2	Josh Allen	QB	Buffalo	20/31, 248 yards, 3 TD
3	Bijan Robinson	RB	Atlanta	29 carries, 194 yards, 2 TD; 2 receptions, 19 yards
4	Kyren Williams	RB	LA Rams	16 carries, 80 yards, 2 TD; 10 receptions, 67 yards
5	Jaylen Warren	RB	Pittsburgh	15 carries, 101 yards, (50-yard TD run); 6 receptions, 87 yards (80-yard touchdown reception)
6	Chad Ryland	PK	Arizona	6-for-6 field goals
7	Bucky Irving	RB	Tampa Bay	24 carries, 106 yards, 2 TD; 1 reception, 1 yard
8	Brock Bowers	TE	Las Vegas	7 receptions, 92 yards, 2 TD
9	Joe Burrow	QB	Cincinnati	24/29, 271 yards, 3 TD; 1 rushing touchdown
10	Patrick Mahomes	QB	Kansas City	22/35, 348 yards, 5 TD; 2 rushes, 15 yards

=== Statistics ===
Most Career NVP Awards
Awards	Player	Position
7	Patrick Mahomes	QB
6	Joe Burrow	QB
4	Josh Allen	QB
3	Jonathan Taylor	RB
3	Saquon Barkley	RB
3	Travis Kelce	TE
3	Derrick Henry	RB

== See also ==
- NFL on Nickelodeon
