= List of NFL Rush Zone episodes =

This is a list of episodes for the series NFL Rush Zone.

== Series overview ==
Season	Episodes	Originally released	
Season	Episodes	First released	Last released
1	22	September 6, 2010	February 5, 2011
2	24	November 30, 2012	October 6, 2013
3	20	November 20, 2013	October 22, 2014

== Episodes ==
=== Season 1: Guardians of the Core (2010–11) ===
No.	Title	Original release date	Prod. code
1	"A Hero is Born"	September 6, 2010	101
At school, Ish is not picked for football during recess (something that happens to him on a regular basis). Later, while playing his football video game at home, he meets OT who tells him that he is just the person he is looking for and that everything Ish needs to know will be explained at the Chargers' home game on Sunday (which Ish and his mom "coincidentally" won tickets to). At the game, he follows the hot dog seller (Turns out to be the Chargers Rusher Bolt in disguise) and discovers a BlitzBot that is there to steal the Chargers' shard, but Ish defeats the BlitzBot with Bolt's help and gets back to his mom unnoticed. Pilot Episode NFL team/s: San Diego Chargers Rusher/s: Bolt
2	"Legacy of the Shards"	September 13, 2010	102
After school, Ish revisits the Chargers' stadium where he learns about the history of the Shards, the Rusherz and a powerful object called the Core: The Rusherz' home planet which held the Core was peaceful, until an evil overlord named Sudden Death attacked the planet to take the Core for himself. The Rusherz stopped Sudden Death by drilling to the Core at the center of the planet and freeing it, which destroyed the planet in the process and cast both the Core and the Rusherz into space. The Rusherz followed the Core to Earth, where it crashed upon landing and broke into 32 Shards (which are recognized as the symbols of the 32 NFL teams). Knowing Sudden Death would not stop until he had the Core, the Rusherz each took a Shard, built the 32 NFL stadiums to hide each one in and assigned the 32 teams to guard their respective Shard in those stadiums. It is explained that Sudden Death's goal is to retrieve all the Shards to rebuild the core, then to use the Core's power to turn everything into BlitzBotz. Following this, Ish meets Norv Turner, who takes him and Bolt under the stadium ground. NFL team/s: San Diego Chargers Rusher/s: Bolt
3	"Meet the Sub"	September 20, 2010	103
Ish is led to a secret room beneath the Chargers' stadium, where he meets his "sub," a humanoid robot he will operate from a special control console to help the NFL teams protect the shards. Ish also gets a special pair of "guardian glasses" from Bolt. Later that night, he meets the Gameballz for the first time. NFL team/s: San Diego Chargers Rusher/s: Bolt
4	"Battle on the Bayou"	September 27, 2010	104
Ish receives a lock from the Gameballz that can teleport him from his locker at school to the locker room of any NFL stadium in the country. With it, he goes to New Orleans, where he attempts and fails to protect the Saints' shard from an army of corkscrew BlitzBots and a saw-armed BlitzBot. NFL team/s: New Orleans Saints and Dallas Cowboys Rusher/s: Alto and Lasso
5	"A Giant Showdown"	October 4, 2010	105
Ish heads to The Big Apple, where he protects the Giants' Shard from the dreaded flying blitzbot disguised as a group of blimps. Note: This is OT's third appearance in the series. NFL team/s: New York Giants and Minnesota Vikings Rusher/s: Liberty and Thor
6	"Mile High Mayhem"	October 11, 2010	106
Ish's Mom (who thinks Ish is on the school football team) starts to get suspicious of Ish running off to guard the Shards. Later, Ish defends the Broncos' Shard from a fast-and-fierce blitzbot and a heavy-duty blitzbot during a Broncos vs. Titans game, but the defeated heavy-duty blitzbot uses the last of its energy to hit Steed with a Corruption Football, turning him into a Blitzbot. Thus, he takes the Broncos' Shard, and when Ish gets home, he is caught by his mom coming out of his locker. NFL team/s: Denver Broncos and Tennessee Titans Rusher/s: Steed and Cyclops
7	"A Hero is Grounded"	October 18, 2010	107
Ish doesn't tell his mom why he was in his locker, so she "grounds" him. Because of this, Ish is unable to protect the Colts' Shard from being stolen by a swarm of Free Football BlitzBotz. NFL team/s: Indianapolis Colts and Washington Redskins Rusher/s: None
8	"Fantasy Football Bot"	October 25, 2010	108
Ish finds and destroys the fantasy football Blitzbot disguised as Calvin Johnson while protecting the Lions' shard, but after he goes back home, he accidentally leaves his locker open and one of his school bullies goes inside it. Note: The bully that goes inside Ish's locker is the same bully that was picking football plays in the pilot episode. NFL team/s: Detroit Lions Rusher/s: Beast
9	"Air Attack"	November 1, 2010	109
With his lock stolen by the school bullies who are intent on finding out what is really going on, Ish must get help from the Rusherz to get from school to the NFL stadiums to defend the shards. To make matters worse, his Sub is damaged while defending the Seahawks' shard from a massive Air-And-Land Blitzbot attack and the shard is stolen, despite additional back-up from the Rusherz of the Falcons, Eagles, Ravens, and Cardinals. NFL team/s: Seattle Seahawks, Atlanta Falcons, Philadelphia Eagles, Baltimore Ravens and Arizona Cardinals Rusher/s: Freefall, Talon, Swoop, Scavenger and Peck
10	"Trespassing In St. Louis"	November 8, 2010	110
Ish stands up to the school bullies and takes his lock back, but before he can use it to go to St. Louis, the bullies force their way into Ish's locker and end up going to St. Louis instead of Ish. The bullies find the Rams' shard, but one of them accidentally uses it to unleash a gigantic stadium Blitzbot. NFL team/s: St. Louis Rams Rusher/s: None
11	"Who's The Bully Now"	November 15, 2010	111
The bullies flee from the stadium blitzbot and Rampage tries to hold it off, only to succumb to its barrage of corruption footballs and become a blitzbot. The Gameballz bring Ish to the battle and he attempts to stop the stadium blitzbot, but he fails and is forced to retreat with the bullies as the two blitzbots steal the Rams' shard. Worse, Sudden Death learns Ish's true identity. When Ish gets home, OT tells Ish to go to the pro football Hall of Fame for training. NFL team/s: St. Louis Rams Rusher/s: Rampage
12	"The Hall Of Legends"	November 27, 2010	112
Ish "wins" a trip to the pro football Hall of Fame and is chaperoned there by Marcus Allen. During his visit, O.T. reveals to Ish the secret of blitzbots living among humans and begins to teach Ish how to harness the power of the Rush Zone. NFL team/s: None Rusher/s: None
13	"The Guardian's Playbook"	November 29, 2010	113
Ish continues his training at the pro football Hall of Fame by battling simulated blitzbots from different Super Bowl scenarios that are initiated by pulling out special rings from their display platforms and is supervised by Pack and Arrow Head, but when Ish pulls out the last ring, he finds a secret chamber with an amazing discovery within it; the Guardian's Playbook! NFL team/s: Green Bay Packers and Kansas City Chiefs Rusher/s: Pack and Arrow Head
14	"The Return of the Sub"	December 6, 2010	114
Ish returns from the pro football Hall of Fame, but starts to experience visions of Sudden Death defeating him. Thanks to the Guardian's Playbook, though, he is now extremely skilled at football (and the school bullies now properly respect Ish). Later, he visits the New England Patriots and Wes Welker shows him his new Sub, the Sub 2.0. Unbeknownst to any of them, Sudden Death has learned how Ish uses his locker to get from his school to the NFL stadiums and is now plotting something. NFL team/s: New England Patriots Rusher/s: Freedom
15	"Ash Meet Ish"	December 13, 2010	115
Sub 2.0. is put to the test when colossus blitzbots attempt to steal the Patriots' shard and it proves to be more powerful than the first. Later at school, a new kid named Ash makes a big impact at football during recess, and not only is Ash good at football, she's also a girl! NFL team/s: New England Patriots and Houston Texans Rusher/s: Freedom and Toro
16	"Rivalry Week"	December 20, 2010	116
Ish realizes that he has a crush on Ash, but there may be more to her then meets the eye. Meanwhile, during rivalry week, tempers flare among the Rusherz in Pittsburgh. NFL team/s: Pittsburgh Steelers and Cincinnati Bengals Rusher/s: Blowtorch and Fang
17	"The Agony of Deceit"	December 27, 2010	117
A heavy-duty Blitzbot attacks a Dolphins game, and Ish is shocked to find Ash at the game, but the biggest shock is when it turns out that Ash is working for Sudden Death! Things get worse when Ash calls in another blitzbot to take Ish to the evil villain! NFL team/s: Miami Dolphins and San Francisco 49ers Rushers/s: Sonar and Pick Ax
18	"A Dark Day for Ish"	January 3, 2011	118
Ish is captured by Sudden Death and his mom, Shandra, discovers that Ish wasn't being honest to her about being on the school football team. John Madden and O.T. provide her with some answers as they escort her to safety. Meanwhile, Grizzly, Claw, Peg Leg and K-9 board Sudden Death's starship to save Ish, but after freeing him, they get cornered by some Blitzbots, Ash and Sudden Death himself. To make matters worse, Peg Leg has planted a football bomb in the ship and time is starting to run out! NFL team/s: Chicago Bears, Carolina Panthers, Tampa Bay Buccaneers and Cleveland Browns Rusher/s: Grizzly, Claw, Peg leg and K-9
19	"The Guardian Escapes"	January 10, 2011	119
Sudden Death orders his blitzbots to destroy Ish and the rushers while Ash remembers how OT thought she was the guardian but was wrong so she joined Sudden Death. Ish then puts on his guardian glasses and sees an escape pod through a wall. He tells the rushers to get him through the wall so Grizzly runs forward and the blitzbots shoot at him, blasting apart the wall in the process. Ish and the rushers then get in the escape pod and leave just as the football bomb goes off, destroying Sudden Death's ship, but when Ish looks back, he sees the head of the ship fly off. He returns to the charger's stadium to find his mom with all the rushers and some NFL players and coaches waiting for him. The stadium's televised screen then shows the head of Sudden Death's ship coming toward earth, and Ish tells them all that Sudden Death is coming and that they will stop him. NFL team/s: All Rusher/s: All
20	"The Gathering Storm"	January 24, 2011	120
The Panthers, Raiders, Bills, and Jaguars' shards are all stolen and their rushers corrupted. Sudden Death then targets the last shard, the shard of the Dallas Cowboys, but Ash is having second thoughts about serving Sudden Death. Meanwhile Ish, his mom, and all the remaining Rushers listen as Michael Strahan gives a speech. They then see a huge dark shadow fall over the stadium. Note: The two teams that made it to the Super Bowl were the Dallas Cowboys and the New York Jets, when in reality, the Super Bowl teams were the Green Bay Packers and the Pittsburgh Steelers. The New York Jets were defeated in the AFC Championship Playoff game and the Dallas Cowboys failed to qualify for the playoffs. NFL team/s: All Rusher/s: All
21	"Super Bowl Goal Line Stand"	January 31, 2011	121
During Super Bowl Sunday, Ish, the players, and the remaining Rusherz make a last stand to defend the Cowboys shard from Sudden Death. Positioning the head of his ship above the stadium, he sends in the first wave of blitzbots, which is easily defeated by Ish and the Rusherz. Angered, Sudden Death sends in a team of blitzbots that assemble into a super blitzbot. Ish and the Rusherz try to get away, but the super blitzbot crushes the Sub. Ish becomes uncertain of what to do next, but Shandra gets an idea... Note #1: Cowboys' owner Jerry Jones makes an appearance in this episode. Note #2: The two teams that made it to the Super Bowl were the Dallas Cowboys and the New York Jets, when in reality, the Super Bowl teams were the Green Bay Packers and the Pittsburgh Steelers. The New York Jets were defeated in the AFC Championship Playoff game and the Dallas Cowboys failed to qualify for the playoffs. NFL team/s: Dallas Cowboys, New York Jets Rusher/s: All
22	"Guardians of the Core"	February 5, 2011	122
The movie begins with the previous 21 episodes running from the first episode until the point Sub 2.0. is destroyed. In the present, Ish comes out onto the field to fight the super Blitzbot with the Rusherz and players. He does so by transforming the goal posts on the field into guardian bots. The guardian bots defeat the super blitzbot, but the final shard is revealed in the process. Sudden Death then comes out onto the field and obtains the shard, and it is during this time that Ish's father arrives to support his son, but Sudden Death mocks them both and reassembles the Core. However, he learns from Ash that what everyone thought was the final shard was a fake and the real one was hidden in a place where Sudden Death least expected it. With that, Ash helps Ish to get Sudden Death's battle axe and he uses it to destroy Sudden Death once and for all. After Sudden Death is destroyed, the six Rusherz that were turned into Blitzbotz are then returned to normal and as a flying blitzbot flies off with what is left of Sudden Death, Ish and Ash reassemble the Core with the real final shard, and celebrate their victory with the Rusherz and the NFL players. Later at school, Ish is picking teams for football during recess. A variety of kids are in front of him, but Ish picks a small child and puts on a new pair of guardian glasses. Season Finale Note #1: This is the only episode with a running time of more than 5:30. Also, this is a television movie. Note #2: The two teams that made it to the Super Bowl were the Dallas Cowboys and the New York Jets, when in reality, the Super Bowl teams were the Green Bay Packers and the Pittsburgh Steelers. The New York Jets were defeated in the AFC Championship Playoff game (By the Steelers 24-19) and the Dallas Cowboys failed to qualify for the playoffs. (6-10) NFL team/s: Dallas Cowboys, New York Jets Rusher/s: All

=== Season 2: Season of the Guardians (2012–13) ===
A second season, titled NFL Rush Zone: Season of the Guardians, was announced by Nickelodeon and the NFL on September 6, 2012. The new season ran 24 episodes, and was produced by Rollman Entertainment, Inc. In the new season, Ish is now 11 and living in Canton, Ohio, and must protect the NFL from a new enemy called "Wildcard". To stop this new enemy, Ish is given new abilities and is assisted by his old friend Ash and four other preteens. The new season began airing on Nicktoons November 30, 2012 at 9:00PM. The show resumed airing new episodes in July 2013. At that time, episodes also saw a same-week premiere on Saturday mornings on NFL Network.

No.	Title	Original release date	Prod. code
1	"Lions, Texans, and Turkeys"	November 30, 2012	201
Ish, now a teen living with his family in Canton, Ohio, is playing with his new friends Troy, Tua, and Marty on the football field. Ash comes over to greet Ish, and, after showing her football throwing prowess to the guys, walks with Ish to his home, lamenting her time working for Sudden Death along the way. The two are confronted by Wild Card, a new adversary, en route. Ish then heads to the Canton Pro Football Hall of Fame to see OT and drop off Ash with his mom. There, his questioning of OT leads him to reveal his true form of RZ 6.0. He explains the situation, gives Ish his Shield Coin, and sends him off to Ford Field in Detroit. After making a temporary retreat, he returns with Ash, who snuck into the Command Center with him, and together, they successfully protect Detroit's Megacore. (The Megacores are vessels that were created to house and channel the power of the shards.) Unbeknownst to them, Detroit's opponent Houston had their Megacore stolen in the meantime. NFL guest star: Calvin Johnson
2	"A Change of Plans"	November 30, 2012	202
Ish is at home with his parents and Ash enjoying Thanksgiving football games when he hears a news report saying how football players in Houston are falling ill. This is due to the absence of Houston's Megacore. Ish and Ash head to RZ's where Ash is formally introduced and given a trial run on being a Guardian. After heading to Dallas and fending off a Scorpion BlitzBot, Ash tells Ish she can't remain a Guardian because her dad found work and the two will be moving. Ish wants Ash to ask her dad to reconsider and she says she'll try. During the car ride home, Ash and her father are attacked by Wild Card. She manages to fend him off long enough to where Wild Card retreats due to his failing energy. Ash then returns to Dallas to assist Ish in defeating Drop Kick and his Megacore enhanced Scorpion BlitzBot, protecting a Megacore while regaining the one previously lost and gaining her Shield Coin in the process. They then return to Ish's house where Ash's father informs her that they won't be moving after all. NFL guest star: DeMarcus Ware
3	"Kick It Up a Notch"	December 7, 2012	203
At the end of a game with five seconds on the clock, Ash fails to make a game winning kick and she berates herself. Troy admonishes her for it, before being called out by Tua and the other guys. This weight of failure carries over to the mission in Foxborough, where she loses to a Mimic BlitzBot, embarrassing herself. She is seemingly embarrassed further while meeting Don Cervantes and his son, and the Bulldogs future opponent, Ricky who bring up her not so stellar previous performance. During the game the next day, they return to Foxborough in anticipation for another attack from the Mimic BlitzBot. There, Ash meets Stephen Gostkowski and obtains advice and wisdom from him. Ish confronts the Mimic and ends up immobilized, leaving Ash to take it down on her own. With her new peace of mind, Ash defeats the Mimic BlitzBot by reflecting its freeze ray back at it. Later, during the Hall of Fame game, Troy apologizes to Ash for his earlier behavior. Finding herself in a similar situation as before, Ash scores the kick that wins the game for the Bulldogs against Ricky and the Tigers. NFL guest stars: Stephen Gostkowski and Rob Gronkowski
4	"Team Up"	December 14, 2012	204
Ish and Ash are called in for a mission to New Orleans when RZ introduces them to a potential new Guardian in Troy. Ish is less than thrilled by this, however, because of an earlier dispute due to Troy not following Ish's game plan and costing them the game. Though he's sent out alone at first, Ish is overwhelmed by the threat, so Ash and Troy go in to assist. However, Troy's inexperience shows deeply when he can't control the weapons on his NFL-R and ends up trapped unmorphed in the Megacore vault with Drop Kick. He retrieves the Megacore, but to no real avail since, due to the limited air supply, he'll pass out leaving the Megacore easy pickings for Drop Kick. In a moment of realization, Troy decides to use the Megacore to blast their way free. With some help from Drop Kick, whom Troy convinces to help with a pep talk, Troy suits up with his last bit of energy and the two use the Megacore to blast through the door. In the end, Drop Kick grabs the Saints' Megacore in the aftermath and escapes before Troy or the others can catch him. NFL guest stars: Drew Brees and Jimmy Graham
5	"Frost and Ten"	December 21, 2012	205
After completing a mission protecting Green Bay's Megacore from a Drill BlitzBot, no thanks at all to Troy, Troy's day worsens when, during a winning game, Coach Jones replaces him for Turner so the latter can get some on-field experience. Turner fumbles the play, though the Bulldogs still win, and Troy fumes at the situation. These events weighing on him, the three Guardians are called back to Green Bay to guard the newly moved Megacore in an ice sculpture in front of Lambeau Field during the game. Before it starts, the three are introduced to Greg Jennings, who proceeds to give Troy much needed insight. Using this insight, Troy comes up with a plan to distract and weaken the Flair Thrower BlitzBot and earns his Shield Coin in the process. After saving two passengers on a blimp recording the game that was hit by a stray attack, Troy and the others work together using the blimp to take down the Flair Thrower BlitzBot, protecting Green Bay's Megacore and procuring the New Orleans Megacore powering it that was previously lost. Later on, Troy, now an official Guardian, helps Turner practice his moves on the school field. NFL guest star: Greg Jennings
6	"Sound Advice"	December 28, 2012	206
Drop Kick breaks into a guarded warehouse and steals the Sonic Molten Matter inside, though his getaway is impeded by the Guardians. However, Drop Kick manages to flee the scene with the tanker by endangering the guards and distracting the Guardians in the process. During class the next day, Ms. Jarvis hands out graded math tests to the students. Of note is Tua's 'D' that was received, a result that prompts Ms. Jarvis to ask Tua to see her after class. Tua later vents his frustrations by showing his strong suit, blocking, on the football field. The day after, Ish learns that Tua's mom has disallowed him from playing football until he gets his grades by up. Ish's offer of help in Tua's studies is turned down. Meanwhile, Drop Kick goes uninterrupted in his theft of an experimental race car. At the Hall of Fame, Tua takes to heart the speech given by Rex Ryan and is later given tickets to Sunday's Jets game. He invites Ish, who declines due to Guardian obligations, upsetting Tua who isn't in the know. On the way, they are attacked by Drop Kick in the stolen vehicle who is after the Megacore Rex Ryan brought with him. One thing leads to another, and Tua grabs the Megacore and runs off with it in the hopes of protecting it, only to be cornered by Drop Kick against a cliff-drop and saved by Ish. Ish brings Tua to the stadium and, on RZ's instruction, reveals his identity to Tua and gives him an NFL-R, thus making Tua a trial Guardian. Together, the two manage to thwart Drop Kick's grab for the Megacore, and with a little help from Rex, destroy the stolen race car. Later, Tua informs his friends that his mother has allowed him to play football again thanks to his new-found sense of perseverance in his schoolwork. NFL guest stars: Rex Ryan and Sione Pouha
7	"Gridiron Ringers"	January 11, 2013	207
Due to a negligent guard, a disguised Drop Kick is able to enter Soldier Field and infest the stadium with Nano BlitzBots before leaving mostly undetected. At the school football field, Tua practices catching Ash's throws. His ability impresses Ash, but Tua feels he isn't agile enough to request playing a non-frontline tackle position, so Ash decides to take Tua to a dance session to help him limber-up. Wild Card scolds Drop Kick for leaving the stadium by flying over a jam-packed expressway in his hover vehicle since it may have given a suspicious signal to the Guardians. After getting called to the Hall of Knowledge, RZ informs the Guardians of the newly-found Nano BlitzBotz and sends Ish and Tua to Chicago. Split up, Tua finds the Nano BlitzBotz seemingly dismantling the stadium and grabs their attention. They form a single BlitzBot and attack Tua who is unable to transform and is eventually saved by Ish. The two head back to RZ who fixes Tua's voice-recognition chip. Meanwhile, in downtown Chicago, Ash and Troy spot two BlitzBotz atop a skyscraper. They take them on, but are overwhelmed until Ish and Tua arrive, with the latter taking down said BlitzBotz single-handed, though they unfortunately overlook the BlitzBotz completed objective. Tua and Ish are sent back to Soldier Field where Wild Card sends another swarm of Nano BlitzBotz that form a giant BlitzBot and steals the Bears and Viking's Megacores. Wild Card then activates the magnet atop the skyscraper that forms a barrier around the stadium as a means of hindering the Guardians. Thanks to Tua's NFL-R, with the help of Richard Dent and Mike Ditka's Super Bowl rings, the barrier is shattered and Tua prevents Wild Card from retreating with the Megacores. He receives his Shield Coin from Ish in the aftermath. Later, during a school game, Ash convinces Ish to let Tua play tight end, a play that works out successfully in the end. NFL guest stars: Richard Dent and Mike Ditka
8	"Spirit and Inspiration"	January 18, 2013	208
During a speech given at the beginning of the 'Turn Pike Rivalry', which the Guardians are attending, Wild Card attacks while also releasing bubbles of negative energy on the crowd that cause them to start arguments for their favorite teams, which the Guardians manage to quell. Drop Kick also kidnaps the Steelers and Browns' Rushers in the distraction. Later, at school football practice, Marty is notably distracted by the events that transpired, since the Browns are his favorite team, and Coach Jones announces the Bulldogs are going up against the so far undefeated MiniSteelers. After practice, RZ sends the Guardians to the Cleveland Browns' stadium to guard the vulnerable Megacores while Wild Card and Drop Kick attempt to siphon energy from the kidnapped Rushers. Meanwhile, in the Hall of Fame, Marty happens upon Shandra while looking for Ish who then offers to give Marty a tour in the meantime. At the stadium, Drop Kick releases more negative energy bubbles that pit the Browns fans and Steelers fans against themselves for who's the better fan which causes a ruckus. Ash and Troy try to stop it only to be affected as well and attack each other. Tua fails to stop Drop Kick, ending up captured for his troubles, when he proceeds to steal the two Megacores after Ish is sent to stop Ash and Troy. It's at this point that RZ decides to have Shandra bring in Marty, inducting him as the fifth Guardian. Back at the stadium, Drop Kick sics some BlitzBotz on the Guardians when Marty, now in his Guardians form, takes back the Steelers' Megacore from Drop Kick. The captured Tua uses some extra power from the weakened Rushers to break them all free and cause Drop Kick to flee, while Marty expertly destroys the source of the negative energy bubbles, collectively winning the day. At the school field, Jim Brown arrives and gives the Bulldogs a pep talk before they face off against the MiniSteelers. NFL guest stars: Jim Brown and Josh Cribbs
9	"Oh Brother"	January 25, 2013	209
After a Guardian practice session, Ish, Ash, Troy, and Tua participate in the try-outs for Canton's 'Punt, Pass, and Kick' competition with Marty as the biased announcer, something Ricky Cervantes calls him out on which Marty doesn't deny. Ash passes in the girls' division and Ish does so in the boy's, despite an ill-timed sneeze into Marty's microphone from Ricky. At the Symbol of Sportsmanship award ceremony, coach brothers John Harbaugh and Jim Harbaugh wish each other good luck before John gets hit by a dart from a hidden Drop Kick and takes it back in front of the entire audience. This prompts RZ to send the Guardians to keep an eye on the two coaches. Ish, Ash, and Coach Jim are attacked by a BlitzBot when Ish takes a dart from Drop Kick in Jim's stead. Drop Kick flees, and Ish is left feeling uncharacteristically angry and aggressive. After nearly getting into a fight with Ricky that was prevented by Ish's father, Ish proceeds to steal the 49ers' Megacore for Wild Card, who is now controlling Ish through the Dart. Ish gives it to John, who is also being controlled and gives it to Wild Card, seemingly at will and on camera for the world to see. The other Guardians show up only to be attacked by the brainwashed Ish. Marty goes to save a now abandoned John from falling into the nearby currents and notices and removes the chip on his neck that was fired from Drop Kick's dart. He uses this knowledge to free Ish as well, earning his Shield Coin soon after. In a better state of mind, Ish apologizes to Ricky for his earlier behavior, wishing Ricky good luck at the Sectionals since he won't be able to attend, and taking Ricky aback as a result, before he and the other Guardians head to Candlestick Park for the game, and the imminent attack from Wild Card. They succeed in repelling the attack and regaining the 49ers' Megacore which allows the two coach brothers to mend things in time for the game. Though it seemed as if Ish and Ash had missed the Sectionals, Ricky informs them that he had his dad postpone it so that he'll be able to face and beat Ish fair and square. NFL guest stars: John Harbaugh and Jim Harbaugh
10–11	"Mystery Guardian"	February 1, 2013	210, 211
The Guardians head to the Super Bowl and find a mysterious Guardian working for Wild Card. NFL guest stars: Justin Tuck and Von Miller Note: The two teams that made it to the Super Bowl were the New York Giants and the Denver Broncos, when in reality, the Super Bowl teams were the Baltimore Ravens and the San Francisco 49ers. The Denver Broncos were defeated in the AFC Divisional Playoff game (by the Ravens in two overtimes, 38–35) and the New York Giants failed to qualify for the playoffs (9–7).
12	"Mystery Solved"	July 14, 2013	212
An apparent betrayal leads to Wild Card confronting RZ face to face, and a new member of the Guardians. Soon, the Guardians learn the origins of Wild Card and RZ, as well as that of themselves. NFL guest stars: Patrick Peterson
13	"Test of Friendship"	July 21, 2013	213
Wild Card targets the Indianapolis Colts' Megacore at the NFL Combine, where the teams evaluate draft prospects. Meanwhile, Ash is going on a trip to San Diego and can bring only one friend with her, which causes the other Guardians to compete for the ticket. NFL guest stars: Andrew Luck and Reggie Wayne
14	"Bands and BlitzBotz"	July 28, 2013	214
Marty and his older brother, Harper, sort out their sibling differences with the help of Cincinnati quarterback Andy Dalton and tight end Jermaine Gresham before Drop Kick can add the Bengals’ Megacore to his collection. NFL guest stars: Andy Dalton and Jermaine Gresham
15	"There's Snow Place Like Home"	August 4, 2013	215
Wild Card uses a BlitzBot to wreak havoc with the weather, causing snow and ice to form in San Diego. Can this threat to the San Diego Chargers’ training camp be stopped? NFL guest stars: Antonio Gates, Nick Hardwick, and Philip Rivers
16	"Cheer Up, Troy"	August 11, 2013	216
Troy is at the Tennessee Titans’ cheerleading camp! With some inspiring words from running back Chris Johnson, Troy uses his new skills to foil Wild Card’s plans. NFL guest star: Chris Johnson
17	"Broken Dreams"	August 18, 2013	217
As the Guardians begin to perform community service, Wild Card targets their dreams to find out their deepest fears. The Guardians must combine their energy into one dream to wake up. NFL guest stars: Arian Foster, Pete Carroll, and Tony Gonzalez
18	"Send in the Clones"	August 25, 2013	218
When Wild Card creates evil clones of the Guardians, the public no longer trusts the real ones! Can the Guardians defeat the clones and earn back the public’s trust? NFL guest stars: Jared Allen and Brian Orakpo
19	"BlitzBotz, Bills and Bucs"	September 1, 2013	219
Ish's mother is kidnapped by Wild Card, and Ish must act fast to save her. Meanwhile, the rest of the Guardians must team up with the Bills to protect their Megacore from BlitzBotz. NFL guest stars: Stevie Johnson and Jim Kelly
20	"Ninja Nightmare"	September 8, 2013	220
The Guardians battle Wild Card's army of Ninja BlitzBotz. NFL guest stars: Cameron Wake and James Laurinaitis
21	"Marty's Mistake"	September 15, 2013	221
Marty accidentally causes RZ 6.0 to reboot which leads to the discovery of startling information about the past. Meanwhile, Wild Card targets the game between the Philadelphia Eagles and the Pittsburgh Steelers at Heinze Field. Can Marty recover from his mistakes in time to help his fellow Guardians? NFL guest stars: Antonio Brown and DeSean Jackson
22	"Drop Kick's Double Cross"	September 22, 2013	222
Drop Kick takes matters into his own hands and unleashes a BlitzBot with the ability to siphon energy. At the same time, Ish becomes jealous of Ricky's acclaim after his team wins a game against the Bulldogs. Will Ish put aside his competitive spirit in order to help his fellow Guardians? NFL guest stars: Darren McFadden and Jamaal Charles
23	"Drop Kick's Downfall"	September 29, 2013	223
Following the events from the previous episode, Drop Kick and Wild Card have become bitter enemies, and while at it Drop Kick tries to destroy the Core at Pro Football Hall of Fame. NFL guest star: Greg Olsen
24	"Wild Card 32, Guardians 0"	October 6, 2013	224
Wild Card manages to obtain all of the Megacores and absorb their power using tech that he used for cloning the Guardians in Send in the Clones, leading to a final showdown between Wild Card and the Guardians, who must act fast to come up with a plan to stop him. In the end, Ish sacrifices his guardian powers to save the Core and the NFL. NFL guest stars: Josh Freeman and Maurice Jones-Drew

=== Season 3: Guardians Unleashed (2013–14) ===
Season 3, NFL Rush Zone: Guardians Unleashed was announced by Nickelodeon and NFL on July 11, 2013. Shortly after the last episode of Season 2 premiered, a promo was released signifying that Sudden Death would return, and that the Guardians would get new suits after the first few episodes. Another change was that this season they used CGI to animate the Rusherz instead of regular 2D animation.

No.	Title	Original release date	Prod. code
1	"The Return of Sudden Death"	November 20, 2013	301
As Season 3 opens, Guardian Leader Ish Taylor is still without his powers, having sacrificed them for the greater good of the NFL and the world. Ash, Troy, Marty, Ricky and Tua do their best to keep Ish part of the group. Even Cleveland Browns' cornerback Joe Haden, and San Diego Chargers running back Ryan Mathews lend their support, but Ish still struggles with not being a full Guardian anymore. Despite this, Ish takes the time to reassure Jackson, Coach Jones's new stepson, and invites him to hang with him and the others. Meanwhile, the stakes are raised when a mysterious spaceship crash-lands in a lake near Canton, carrying three evil Anticorians - Angkoro, Stellaria, and Zich - and their army of ferocious Blitz Borgz. They've come to Earth to join their supreme leader, Sudden Death, a vicious cyborg who nearly captured the Core in Season 1, but was defeated by Ish. Now Sudden Death is back, and looking for revenge. He captures Ish, and offers to restore his powers, if he will prove his loyalty to him, by stealing the Browns and Chargers Megacores. NFL Guest Stars: Joe Haden and Ryan Mathews NFL Teams Featured: Cleveland Browns and San Diego Chargers
2	"Ish's Audible"	November 27, 2013	302
When Ish attempts to trick the Anticorians and later rejects joining the villains' side, the Anticorians fit him with an Anticorian Cuff, a device that allows Sudden Death to control Ish's mind and actions. They send Ish out to steal the Detroit Lions Megacore. The rest of the Guardians confront him, and are nearly defeated, as they discover the Anticorian Blitz Borgz can drain their powers. Ricky also overhears the Anticorians' plan: steal the 32 Megacores for Sudden Death before the next solar alignment or risk being trapped on Earth forever. While the Guardians retreat to recharge, RZ 6.0 issues an NFL Rush Zone Red Alert that Ish must be stopped. Ricky takes it upon himself to confront the Anticorians and Blitz Borgz with the Shrink Ray received from Ish earlier that returns the Blitz Borgs to their capsule form. With Detroit Lions Wide Receiver Calvin Johnson's help and reverse encouragement from Sudden Death's harsh words, Ish is able to find his inner strength and partially recovers his Guardian powers long enough to escape Sudden Death, and retrieve the stolen Megacores. The Guardians welcome Ish back, and get a glimpse of his new enhanced powers, if only he can find a way to make them permanent. NFL Guest Star: Calvin Johnson NFL Team Featured: Detroit Lions
3	"Redzone Retaliation"	December 4, 2013	303
After a game of Redzone Retaliation between Marty and Jackson, with the latter as the winner, Marty and Troy are offered special controllers by two individuals, only to be trapped in a virtual Redzone Retaliation by the disguised Angkoro and Stellaria. Ish and the others notice something's wrong when they fail to meet up online for their fantasy football meeting despite Jackson saying he was just with them. Their investigation with RZ leads them to Pittsburgh. While Ish gets some good advice from Head Coaches Mike Tomlin and Marvin Lewis in that being on the sidelines doesn't mean being sidelined, Ash and Tua are successfully captured by the Anticorians. Ish decides to ask Jackson for some Redzone Retaliation pointers and discovers some of his notes on game plays which he suggests Jackson should show Coach Jones. Meanwhile, Ricky, now at Hines Field, is also captured, along with the Steelers and Bengals Rusherz. With the info and custom controller from Jackson, Ish logs on and faces Sudden Death's team in a game of sudden death for his friend's freedom. They win, but Sudden Death attempts to use energy beams to destroy the Guardians, which Ish then uses to his advantage as a means of transporting the Guardians out. Sudden Death tries to make this backfire by sending the energy straight to Ish, but this allows Ish to transform and free the others anyway, regaining his powers in the process. Later, at a school game against the MiniSteelers, Ish thanks Jackson for his tips, and Jackson, who took Ish's advice and let Coach Jones in on his gameplay ideas, becomes his Stepdad's new Assistant Coach, all the while the Anticorians are punished by Sudden Death for failing to steal the Steelers' Megacore, even though they manage to steal the Bengal's Megacore. NFL Guest Stars: Mike Tomlin and Marvin Lewis NFL Teams Featured: Pittsburgh Steelers and Cincinnati Bengals
4	"Downstream Revenge"	December 11, 2013	304
Green Bay Packers Jordy Nelson aids Tua with some family matters just as the Anticorians use the elements at hand to launch a major attack on Lambeau Field. The Miami Dolphins Ryan Tannehill helps the Guardians save the day. NFL Guest Stars: Jordy Nelson and Ryan Tannehill NFL Teams Featured: Green Bay Packers and Miami Dolphins
5	"Gone Viral"	December 18, 2013	305
Sudden Death unleashes a diabolical virus to ruin the holidays. Kansas City Chiefs Jamaal Charles and New York Giants Justin Tuck jump in to help, and RZ6.0 gives the Guardians new suits and new powers as Christmas gifts to stop Sudden Death. NFL Guest Stars: Jamaal Charles and Justin Tuck NFL Teams Featured: Kansas City Chiefs and New York Giants
6	"White Out"	January 1, 2014	306
Ricky gets some bad news from his dad that he lost his job, so Ricky tries to make money by snow shoveling until his dad can find a new job. Meanwhile, the Anticorians use a snowstorm to launch an attack; The Guardians get a lesson in toughness from Chicago Bears Julius Peppers and Matt Forte and Seattle Seahawks Russell Wilson. NFL Guest Stars: Julius Peppers, Matt Forte, and Russell Wilson NFL Teams Featured: Chicago Bears and Seattle Seahawks
7	"Web of Deceit"	January 8, 2014	307
Determined to become second in command, Stellaria captures Megacores, along with Ash and Denver Broncos Eric Decker, using a secret weapon. With the help of the Baltimore Ravens Ray Rice, the Guardians unravel Stellaria’s plan. NFL Guest Stars: Eric Decker and Ray Rice NFL Teams Featured: Denver Broncos and Baltimore Ravens
8	"Rivals Revisited"	January 15, 2014	308
The Guardians get a lesson in rivalry on and off the field from Washington Redskins Robert Griffin III and Dallas Cowboys DeMarcus Ware as Ricky saves the world from Sudden Death’s intergalactic evil plot. NFL Guest Stars: Robert Griffin III and DeMarcus Ware NFL Teams Featured: Washington Redskins and Dallas Cowboys
9	"All-Star Deception"	January 22, 2014	309
NFL Legends Cincinnati Bengals Cris Collinsworth and Dallas Cowboys Michael Irvin coach the kids’ All-Star game, while Troy makes an “all-star” play of his own by saving the Super Bowl teams’ Megacores. NFL Guest Stars: Cris Collinsworth and Michael Irvin NFL Teams Featured: None in specific
10	"Sudden Death Showdown"	February 1, 2014	310
Houston Texans' J. J. Watt and San Francisco 49ers' Vernon Davis help the Guardians defeat Sudden Death to keep him from hurling the Earth into deep space. NFL Guest Stars: J. J. Watt and Vernon Davis NFL Teams Featured: Houston Texans and San Francisco 49ers Note: The two teams that made it to the Super Bowl were the San Francisco 49ers and the Houston Texans, when in reality, the Super Bowl teams were the Seattle Seahawks and the Denver Broncos. The San Francisco 49ers were defeated in the NFC Championship Playoff game (by the Seahawks, 23–17) and the Houston Texans failed to qualify for the playoffs (2–14).
11–12	"Knights of the Sky"	May 7, 2014	311, 312
The Guardians embark on a space adventure; the Guardians set out to find the missing pieces of the Anti-Core; RZ6.0 summons the help of Nick Mangold, Robert Griffin III, Cris Collinsworth and Michael Irvin to defend against Sudden Death. NFL Guest Stars: Nick Mangold, Robert Griffin III, Cris Collinsworth, and Michael Irvin NFL Teams Featured: None in specific
13	"The Return of Drop Kick"	September 3, 2014	313
New England Patriots' Danny Amendola and Atlanta Falcons' Matt Ryan must come to Tua's rescue. Meanwhile, Sudden Death reveals he has rebuilt Drop Kick, and has plans for him. NFL Guest Stars: Danny Amendola and Matt Ryan NFL Teams Featured: New England Patriots and Atlanta Falcons
14	"Troy's Comeback"	September 10, 2014	314
Minnesota Vikings' Adrian Peterson teaches Troy how to safely come back from an injury. Jared Allen helps the Guardians recover the Vikings' stolen megacore, meanwhile Drop Kick breaks Wild Card out of prison for Sudden Death's latest plan. NFL Guest Stars: Adrian Peterson and Jared Allen NFL Team Featured: Minnesota Vikings
15	"A Chip of the Old Blocker"	September 17, 2014	315
Oakland Raiders Hall of Famer Howie Long gives Ish some fatherly advice about expectations. But with the Hall of Fame game under attack it's RZ6.0 who must confront the unexpected when he learns his son Wild Card is back. NFL Guest Star: Howie Long NFL Team Featured: Oakland Raiders
16	"Anticorian Unrest"	September 24, 2014	316
When the Anticorians attack, Carolina Panthers Greg Olsen and Indianapolis Colts Andrew Luck help out, and Ash finds her future step mom Linda is accidentally caught up in the action. NFL Guest Stars: Greg Olsen and Andrew Luck NFL Teams Featured: Carolina Panthers and Indianapolis Colts
17	"Rumors Run Wild"	October 1, 2014	317
Drop Kick captures Buffalo Bills C. J. Spiller and Sudden Death makes an evil clone from his DNA. The Guardians, who struggle to get past a rumor that threatens to come between Ish and Ash, turn to Tennessee Titans Kendall Wright for help. NFL Guest Stars: C. J. Spiller and Kendall Wright NFL Teams Featured: Buffalo Bills and Tennessee Titans
18	"Anticorians Outplayed"	October 8, 2014	318
A framed double-cross by Wild Card tricks Sudden Death into turning on the Anticorians, and leaves the Guardians unsure whom to trust. Philadelphia Eagles Brent Celek and Arizona Cardinals Larry Fitzgerald give Ish and Marty advice on facing the unexpected. NFL Guest Stars: Brent Celek and Larry Fitzgerald NFL Teams Featured: Philadelphia Eagles and Arizona Cardinals
19	"Never Underestimate the Wild Card"	October 15, 2014	319
Wedding bells ring for Ash's dad, and after secrets get tougher to keep from Ash's step mom, she confesses to Linda that she is a guardian, leaving her concerned for Ash's safety. Ash considers giving up being a guardian. Meanwhile, Sudden Death attempts to steal the New Orleans Saints' Super Bowl XLIV rings to fuel his latest plan, so the Guardians, New Orleans Saints Marques Colston and St. Louis Rams James Laurinaitis, attempt to save them. Later, Sudden Death is tricked by Wild Card and Drop Kick, but their plan fails, and Sudden Death gets back the rings, which also ends in the destruction of his own lair. NFL Guest Stars: Marques Colston and James Laurinaitis NFL Teams Featured: New Orleans Saints and St. Louis Rams
20	"The Final Betrayal"	October 22, 2014	320
In the Series Finale, Jacksonville Jaguars Marcedes Lewis and Tampa Bay Buccaneers Gerald McCoy help the Guardians at the International Series game in London when Sudden Death unleashes his biggest weapon yet. But can they trust Wild Card to help? NFL Guest Stars: Marcedes Lewis and Gerald McCoy NFL Teams Featured: Jacksonville Jaguars and Tampa Bay Buccaneers Note: The two teams that face off in the International Series game are the Jacksonville Jaguars and the Tampa Bay Buccaneers, when in reality, there were three International Series games. The Jaguars were defeated in their game by the Dallas Cowboys 31–17. While the Buccaneers did not participate in the International Series.
