= NFL Rush Zone =

- Season 1 title card
- Genre: Action; Adventure; Superhero
- Directed by: Rohitash Rao
- Starring: Joshua Jackson; Sebastion Elliot; Nathaniel Stampley; Zachary Appelman; Amber Renae Gray; Marisa Kreiss; Malachi Cohen; Nika Futterman; Johnny Yong Bosch; Ogie Banks; Andy Aragon; Nicolas Roye
- Opening theme: "We Are The Guardians" by: Forever the Sickest Kids; S2–3
- Composer: David Robidoux
- Country of origin: United States
- Original language: English
- No. of seasons: 3
- No. of episodes: 65 (22 short length episodes + 1 television movie + 42 full length episodes) (list of episodes)

Production
- Producers: Courtney Franson; Cash B. Lim
- Running time: approx. 2:00 – 5:30 minutes (short length episodes) 60:00 (television movie w/ commercials) approx. 22:00 minutes (regular length episode w/o commercials)
- Production companies: Curious Pictures (season 1); Rollman Entertainment; Nickelodeon Productions

Original release
- Network: Nickelodeon; Nicktoons; NFL Network
- Release: September 6, 2010 – October 22, 2014

NFL Rush Zone is an American action-adventure animated television series. In the first season, the show centers on an 11-year-old football fan named Ish, who learns he must protect shards of a power source called "The Core", hidden at 32 NFL stadiums. The first season ended on February 5, 2011 with a double length episode. Nickelodeon announced a second season, titled NFL Rush Zone: Season of the Guardians on September 6, 2012; it premiered on November 30, 2012. The third season, NFL Rush Zone: Guardians Unleashed, was announced on July 11, 2013; it premiered on November 20, 2013 and ended on October 22, 2014. The series ended on an apparent cliffhanger with Wild Card's escape and vowing to return, indicating that a fourth season was planned. However, the season ultimately never materialized.

== Synopsis ==
Season 1 – "Guardians of the Core"

Ish must protect one or more NFL team's Core shards from the villainous intergalactic alien cyborg warlord and conqueror Sudden Death every Sunday while trying not to be caught by his mom. He protects the shards with the help of OT and the Rusherz.

Season 2 – "Season of the Guardians"

One year after the defeat of Sudden Death, Ish has moved from San Diego to Canton, Ohio, and soon finds his role as a Guardian expanded with new powers and the emergence of the villainous Wild Card. With the aid of his old friend Ash and new friends Troy, Tua, Marty, and later, Ricky, Ish must protect the 32 Megacores of the NFL from Wild Card, while also diving into the villain's mysterious past.

Season 3 – "Guardians Unleashed"

Wild Card has been defeated, but at the cost of Ish losing his Guardian powers. Having been the first Guardian, Ish is hit hard by this loss, while a newly resurfaced Sudden Death looks to continue where he left off, with three robotic aliens called Anticorians, who have had a sworn rivalry with the Rusherz, and perhaps with the help of a now vulnerable Ish. Ish, however soon regains his powers, and he and his friends have theirs upgraded for the re-match against Sudden Death and his allies the Anti-Corians, as well as the returns of Wild Card and Drop Kick.

== Theme Song ==
- Nu Sunt by Nicoleta Nuca (Univision)
- We are the Guardians by Forever the Sickest Kids (Nicktoons)

== Characters ==
=== Main ===
Ishmael "Ish" Taylor – A natural-born leader of African-American descent. He is hip, funny, smart, insightful, caring and brave. He loves video games and football and has a winning personality that endears him to his community. Ish was the very first Guardian, and lived in San Diego, California in the first season. In the second season, Season of the Guardians, Ish is now 11 years old, and living with his family in their new home of Canton, Ohio, and is captain of his local football team. With more training and experience than before, he is able to manifest a power armor with various abilities that consists of a football uniform and helmet via his new NFL-R watch with an inserted shield coin by shouting "Enter the Rush Zone!" and turning the dial his Guardian codename is QB1. He is soon joined by a new team of Guardians with similar power armors, including his old friend Ash, and works together with them to protect the 32 Megacores from the evil Wild Card's clutches. In the second season finale, he sacrificed his Guardian powers to defeat Wild Card. His powers later returned and upgraded in the third season, Guardians Unleashed. His favorite team is the San Diego Chargers. He is voiced by Joshua Jackson in the first season, and Malachi Cohen in the second and third seasons.

Ashley "Ash" Reynolds – A tomboyish Caucasian redhead with freckles and green eyes, she is a good student and athlete. During the first season, she was under Sudden Death's spell, and only befriended Ish initially under his orders, but soon genuinely came to like him, and overcame Sudden Death's power to help Ish defeat him. In the second season, Ash is 11 years old, has reformed and is looking to redeem herself. She lost her mother a few years ago, and is now being raised by Charles Reynolds, her loving, and sometimes overprotective father. She is the brains of the group – complex plays or stats are easy for her, Her Guardian codename is PK2. Her favorite team is the New England Patriots. She is voiced by Marisa Kreiss (daughter of head writer Nick Kreiss) in the first season, and by Nika Futterman in the second and third seasons.

Troy Kang – A fun-loving and daring, slightly arrogant and hot-headed Korean-American 11-year-old boy who often leaps before he looks. But he is also incredibly loyal and dependable, especially when bravery is needed. Troy is a terrific athlete, but often he struggles to keep his grades up and is under constant pressure from his parents to do so. Being a Guardian teaches him to be a better team player his Guardian codename is WR3, and someone who can share the spotlight and put the needs of others first. His favorite team is the New Orleans Saints. He is voiced by Johnny Yong Bosch.

Tua Tupola – An 11-year-old Samoan-American from a family that is completely into football. He is the muscle and heart of the team. Because Tua is a boy of few words, people sometimes underestimate his intelligence, but he is actually very smart. He is warm, caring, insightful, thoughtful, and a straight shooter. He can be shy and a little insecure, but don't get him mad – he is a fierce fighter and a terrific football player. He is laid-back and easy-going, but being a Guardian teaches him the importance of practice and persistence his Guardian codename is T4. His favorite team is the Chicago Bears. He is voiced by Ogie Banks. Marcus Griffith Replaces Banks in "Guardians Unleashed"

Martin "Marty" Stevens – An excitable fast-talking, Caucasian 11-year-old who is always ready to pull a prank, crack a joke, or defend his beloved Cleveland Browns. He is the class clown of the team, but also really smart, a good student, and handy with tech and computers. He has agility and moves like no other. When it comes time to fight, he can spin, twist, jump or dodge just about anything his Guardian codename is RB5. His favorite team is the Cleveland Browns. He is voiced by Andy Aragon.

Ricardo "Ricky" Cervantes – A tough, competitive 11-year-old kid of Latino descent with an even tougher, more competitive dad. Ricky is rough on the outside and can be sarcastic and blunt. But he proves himself to be a loyal and dedicated friend and has something of a close bond with Ash. He started off as a rival towards Ish and was once under Wild Card's control, but now works with Ish and his friends as a Guardian his Guardian codename is QB6. Ricky is the QB of the rival Youth Tackle Football team, the Tigers, and has amazing arm strength and firepower and can throw a football harder, faster and more accurately than just about anyone. His favorite team is the Arizona Cardinals. He is voiced by Nicolas Roye.

=== Villains ===
Sudden Death – In the first season, he planned on using the Core to take over the universe and hired Ash when she was rejected as the Guardian. He was destroyed at the end of season 1 during the final battle for the Core... but his final words to Ish were that they hadn't seen the last of him. This was later proven true after he returned in the third season, with a new plan to use the Megacores to either rule or destroy Earth. He is voiced by Matthew Mercer.

The Anticorians – Three alien humanoids who have sworn rivalry with Rusherz. They come to serve Sudden Death as their almighty leader in the third season.

- Angkoro – Obsequious, conniving and ruthless Anticorian. Uses telekinesis to levitate objects with his Antigravity power. Angkoro wants to be Sudden Death's number two, but is neither as strong nor as smart as his two colleagues, much to his dismay. He is voiced by Cam Clarke.
- Stellaria – Sleek, ninja-like Anticorian female. Smart, savvy, and athletic, she possesses the ability to conjure the power of wind to battle her enemy. She is voiced by Nika Futterman.
- Zich – Large, brutish, strong, smart. Zich is both the technical brains and brawn behind the Anticorians. He speaks only in grunts but the Anticorians have no problem understanding him. His size is imposing. He is voiced by Liam O'Brien.

Wild Card – The main antagonist of the second season who wants to destroy the guardians and the NFL. He has a very short temper and hates losing more than anything. In the episode "The Mystery Guardian", it is revealed that Wild Card's true identity is Warren Zimmer, Richard Zimmer's (thus RZ's) son. He is finally defeated when his powers overloaded in the second season finale. Although this is not the end of Wild Card as he later returns as a supporting antagonist in the third season, when Sudden Death breaks him out of prison and forces him to work with him, but soon convinces Drop Kick, who had betrayed him the previous season to plot against Sudden Death and the Anticorians. After playing both sides in the third season finale, he escapes, vowing to eventually return while telling Ish and his friends to never underestimate the Wild Card. Due to the show’s abrupt cancellation, his fate is unknown. He is voiced by Troy Baker.

Drop Kick – Wild Card's mostly incompetent robot lackey, who is frequently the target of Wild Card's rage. In the episode "The Mystery Guardian", it is revealed that Drop Kick's true identity is Sidekick, also known as RZ 1.0, Richard Zimmer's robot assistant. Eventually, fed up with Wild Card's mistreatment of him, Drop Kick betrays his master near the end of the second season to try and take power for himself, but is defeated and destroyed by the Guardians. The Anticorians later rebuild him during the third season, but he is manipulated in to plotting against them and Sudden Death by Wild Card. He is destroyed once more in the season finale. He is voiced by Jesse Corti.

BlitzBotz – Sudden Death's mechanical minions with one mission: collect the shards. They also have an arsenal of corruption footballs, which corrupt biological beings, transforming them into fellow BlitzBotz. 6 Rusherz had succumbed to this power, but were freed from it after Sudden Death's defeat.

=== Allies ===
OT as RZ – The strange man who explains to Ish about the Core, the Rusherz, and Sudden Death. In the second season, he reveals himself as a supercomputer named RZ 6.0, telling Ish that "OT" was just one of many avatars he took to hide his true self. In the episode "The Mystery Guardian", it is revealed that he contains the essence of the scientist who made him, Richard Zimmer, as a result of an accident caused when Richard, with his son and his robot assistant performed an experiment with the power of the Core He is voiced by Liam O'Brien.

Shandra Taylor – Ish's mother. At first, she was clueless to the goings-on in regards to Ish's Guardian Status and was deeply puzzled by his newfound propensity to wander off, though she later found out. Soon after, OT warns her that, as the Guardian's parent, she would be a target for Sudden Death. In the second season, a few years after the defeat of Sudden Death, she and her husband, Lt. Matt Taylor, are aware of Ish's Guardian activities and have agreed to let Ish continue them. More than once has she has had to cover for her son's disappearances, and currently works as a tour guide at the Pro Football Hall of Fame.

Bolt – the Chargers Rusher, whom Ish met at the Chargers home game. He is a humanoid creature whose outfit consists of a white and blue football helmet with Chargers lightning bolts for a facemask and wears blue and yellow shorts with floral print. He was voiced by Zach Appelman.

The Gameballz – Ish's guardians in the first season:

- Huddle – a golden colored football with laces for a mouth who can speak Spanish.
- Fumble – A light salmon colored football with a green mohawk.
- Scream – A traditionally colored football with one eye, who is the more intelligent and tactical of the group.
- Additionally, Gameballz representing NFL teams appeared throughout the series.

=== Minor ===
- Norv Turner – the Minnesota Vikings former offensive coordinator. Was the San Diego Chargers head coach at the time of the show.
- Sean Payton – the New Orleans Saints head coach at the time of the show
- Mike Tomlin – the Pittsburgh Steelers head coach at the time of the show. In the episode "Rivalry Week," he can be seen breaking up a fight between Fang and Blowtorch.
- John Madden – retired NFL commentator, former NFL player, former head coach of the Oakland Raiders.
- Michael Strahan – Former New York Giants player, analyst on Fox NFL Sunday
- Jerry Jones – Owner/GM of the Dallas Cowboys.
- Shannon Sharpe – Former Denver Broncos tight end.
- Marcus Allen – Former Los Angeles Raiders running back, current ESPN NFL analyst.
- Brian Dawkins – Former Safety for the Philadelphia Eagles and Denver Broncos
- Steven Jackson – Running back for the Atlanta Falcons.
- Larry Fitzgerald – Wide receiver for the Arizona Cardinals.
- Eli Manning – Quarterback for the New York Giants.
- Drew Brees – Quarterback for the New Orleans Saints

=== Rusherz ===
The Rusherz are a race of humanoid alien beings from a distant planet, who bear some resemblance to an NFL team's logo, the city the team is from, or from that franchise's history. According to OT, they were responsible for the creation of the NFL's 32 teams.

- Bolt - the Chargers' Rusher (Voiced: Tony Oliver).
- Alto - the Saints' Rusher (Voiced: Kyle Herbert).
- Liberty - the Giants' Rusher (Voiced: Keith Silverstein).
- Beast - the Lions' Rusher (Voiced: Dave Wittenberg).
- Freefall - The Seahawks' Rusher (Voiced: Derek Stephen Prince).
- Steed - the Broncos' Rusher (Voiced: Kyle Herbert).
- Rampage - the Rams' Rusher (Voiced: Patrick Seitz).
- Pack - the Packers' Rusher (Voiced: Kyle Herbert).
- Talon - the Falcons' Rusher (Voiced: Liam O'Brien (Travis Willingham, S3 EP 13)).
- Freedom - the Patriots' Rusher (Voiced: Dave Wittenberg).
- Swoop - the Eagles' Rusher (Voiced: Eric Bauza).
- Stallion - the Colts' Rusher (Voiced: Kirk Thornton).
- Scavenger - the Ravens' Rusher (Voiced: Ogie Banks (Marcus Griffith S3 EP 7)).
- Blowtorch - the Steelers' Rusher (Voiced: Troy Baker (Roger Rose, S3 Ep 3, Josh Taft, S2 EP 21)).
- Peck - the Cardinals' Rusher (Voiced: Keith Silverstein).
- Sonar - the Dolphins' Rusher (Voiced: Patrick Seitz).
- Pick Ax - the 49ers' Rusher (Voiced: Liam O'Brien).
- Thor - the Vikings' Rusher (Voiced: Travis Willingham).
- Lasso - the Cowboys' Rusher (Voiced: Troy Baker).
- Arrow Head - the Chiefs' Rusher (Voiced: James Mathis III).
- Toro - the Texans' Rusher (Voiced: Matthew Mercer).
- Fang - the Bengals' Rusher (Voiced: Liam O'Brien).
- Cyclops - the Titans Rusher (Voiced: John Bently).
- Grizzly - The Bears' Rusher (Voiced: Roger Rose).
- Claw - the Panthers' Rusher (Voiced: David Lodge).
- Peg Leg - the Buccaneers' Rusher (Voiced: Matthew Mercer).
- K-9 - the Browns' Rusher (Voiced: Liam O'Brien)
- Chief - the Redskins' Rusher (Voiced: James Mathis III).
- Soar - the Jets' Rusher (Voiced: Matthew Mercer).
- Stampede - the Bills' Rusher (Voiced: Roger Craig Smith).
- Spot - the Jaguars' Rusher (Voiced: Liam O'Brien).
- Pillage (now known as Spike) - the Raiders' Rusher (Voiced: James Mathis III).

== Episodes ==
Season	Episodes	Originally released	
Season	Episodes	First released	Last released
1	22	September 6, 2010	February 5, 2011
2	24	November 30, 2012	October 6, 2013
3	20	November 20, 2013	October 22, 2014
