= Nate Burleson =

Canadian-American football player and television host (born 1981)

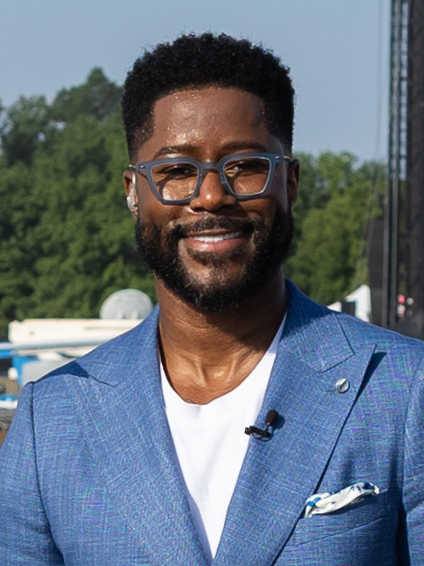
- Burleson in 2026

No. 14, 81, 13
- Position: Wide receiver

Personal information
- Born: August 19, 1981 (age 45); Calgary, Alberta, Canada
- Listed height: 6 ft 0 in (1.83 m)
- Listed weight: 198 lb (90 kg)

Career information
- High school: O'Dea (Seattle, Washington, U.S.)
- College: Nevada (1999–2002)
- NFL draft: 2003: 3rd round, 71st overall pick

Career history
- Minnesota Vikings (2003–2005); Seattle Seahawks (2006–2009); Detroit Lions (2010–2013); Cleveland Browns (2014)*
- * Offseason or practice squad member only

Awards and highlights
- Seattle Seahawks 35th Anniversary team; First-team All-American (2002)

Career NFL statistics
- Receptions: 457
- Receiving yards: 5,630
- Receiving touchdowns: 39
- Return yards: 2,809
- Return touchdowns: 4
- Stats at Pro Football Reference

Nathaniel Eugene Burleson (born August 19, 1981) is a Canadian-American television host, football commentator, and former football player. He played professionally as a wide receiver in the National Football League (NFL). Playing college football for the Nevada Wolf Pack, he earned first-team All-American honors in 2002. Burleson was selected by the Minnesota Vikings in the third round of the 2003 NFL draft. He was also a member of the Seattle Seahawks and Detroit Lions.

Burleson is now at Paramount Skydance, co-hosting CBS Mornings and March Madness coverage, hosting a revival of the classic game show Hollywood Squares, and serving as an analyst for The NFL Today for CBS, as well as covering football for Nickelodeon by hosting NFL Slimetime with Dylan Gilmer and serving as a commentator for the network’s NFL broadcasts. He previously co-hosted Good Morning Football on NFL Network, along with being a New York correspondent for the entertainment news program Extra from 2019 to 2021. He has been featured on several rap songs under the name New Balance.

== Early life ==
Burleson was born in Calgary, Alberta, Canada. At the time his father, Al Burleson, was playing defensive back for the Calgary Stampeders of the Canadian Football League (CFL). His oldest brother, Alvin Jr., played college football for the University of Washington Huskies and the Western Illinois University Leathernecks. Another older brother, Kevin played professional basketball and was formerly a point guard for the Charlotte Bobcats of the National Basketball Association (NBA). His younger brother Lyndale played college basketball for the University of Nevada Wolf Pack. Kevin and Nate Burleson are one of only two sibling duos in which one brother played in the NBA while the other played in the NFL. As a mark of his father's influence, Nate Burleson's jersey number on the Seattle Seahawks, 81, was his father's high school number.

In 1983, his father signed with the Los Angeles Express of the United States Football League (USFL), moving the family back to the United States. However, Burleson remains proud of his Canadian citizenship, sporting a maple leaf tattoo and expressing interest in playing for Canada in a World Cup of football to the media. After an injury ended Alvin Burleson's playing career, he moved the family to his hometown of Seattle, Washington, U.S., where he worked for Associated Grocers. Nate Burleson attended Rainier View Elementary School in Seattle. He attended Lindbergh High School in the suburb of Renton as a freshman, and then transferred to O'Dea High School in Seattle, where he graduated. As a senior, he was named Seattle Times City Athlete of the Year.

Burleson was also on the school's track and field team, competing as a sprinter and hurdler. He won the state title in the 300-meter hurdles with a time of 38.70 seconds in 1999, and finished eighth in 110-meter hurdles as junior.

== College career ==
Burleson hoped to attend the University of Washington in Seattle, his father's alma mater, but was not offered a football scholarship. Instead he accepted a scholarship offer from the University of Nevada in Reno and played for the Wolf Pack, then in the Western Athletic Conference (WAC). In his senior season in 2002, he made 138 receptions, the second highest in NCAA history, and led the NCAA in both receiving yards and in receptions per game. At Nevada, Burleson had 248 receptions for 3,293 yards with 22 touchdowns; he was named first-team All-America by the American Football Coaches Association, all-conference (WAC), team MVP, and was named second-team All-America by The Sporting News and CNN/SI. He currently holds the WAC and Nevada all-time records for single game receptions with 19 catches. He graduated with a degree in human development and family studies.

== Professional career ==
Pre-draft measurables
| Height | Weight | Arm length | Hand span | 40-yard dash | 10-yard split | 20-yard split | 20-yard shuttle | Three-cone drill | Vertical jump | Broad jump |
|---|---|---|---|---|---|---|---|---|---|---|
| 6 ft 0 1/2 in (1.84 m) | 197 lb (89 kg) | 31 1/8 in (0.79 m) | 9 in (0.23 m) | 4.51 s | 1.58 s | 2.65 s | 4.16 s | 6.96 s | 42.5 in (1.08 m) | 10 ft 6 in (3.20 m) |
All values from NFL Combine

=== Minnesota Vikings ===
Burleson was selected in the third round of the 2003 NFL draft by the Minnesota Vikings, the 71st overall pick. Despite showing promise, Burleson did not put up strong numbers during his rookie season. In his second season, 2004, an injury to fellow receiver Randy Moss opened up opportunity for Burleson as he became the team's number one receiver. Burleson put up strong numbers, reaching over 1,000 receiving yards for the first time in his career. Not only a good receiver, but also a standout special teams player, Burleson is the only player in NFL history to have three punt returns of 90 or more yards.

=== Seattle Seahawks ===
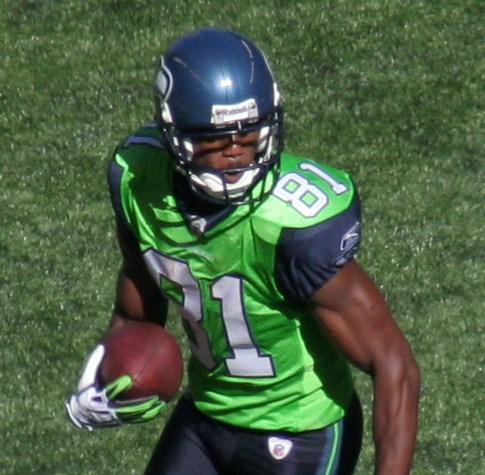
Burleson with the Seahawks in 2009

On March 24, 2006, Burleson signed a seven-year $49 million offer sheet to play with his hometown Seattle Seahawks. In retribution for the Vikings signing an offer sheet with former Seahawks guard Steve Hutchinson, the Seahawks put clauses in Burleson's offer sheet which made it virtually impossible for Minnesota to match (similar to what the Vikings did with Hutchinson). The offer sheet stated that the entire $49 million would be guaranteed if Burleson played five games, in one season, in the state of Minnesota, or if his average per year exceeded the average of all running backs on the team combined. The Vikings played eight home games a year in Minneapolis, and at the time of the offer sheet, the team spent far less than $7 million per year for its entire running back corps. On the other hand, Seattle was spending over $7 million a year on just one of its running backs (Shaun Alexander). The Vikings had seven days to match the offer sheet but declined to do so. Minnesota received Seattle's third-round pick in the 2006 NFL draft; Seattle, however, received no compensation for the departure of Hutchinson. On September 7, 2008, Burleson tore a ligament in his knee in Seattle's season opener against the Bills. He was put on injured reserve for the remainder of the season.

Burleson owns the Seahawk team record for most punt return yards in a single season (2007) as well as career punt return yards.

=== Detroit Lions ===
During the early hours of the NFL free agency period on March 5, 2010, Burleson agreed to a five-year $25 million contract with the Detroit Lions. Burleson reunited with his former offensive coordinator, Scott Linehan, with whom he had his best season of his career in 2004, when he caught 68 passes for 1,006 yards and nine touchdowns while playing for the Vikings. In 2011, Burleson was named recipient of the Detroit Lions-Detroit Sports Broadcasters Association/Pro Football Writers Association's Media-Friendly "Good Guy Award" for his interactions with the media. On September 24, 2013, Burleson fractured his forearm in two places in an early morning, single-car crash. It was reported that Burleson was attempting to save a pizza from falling off a seat in his car and lost control of his vehicle. He was cut from the Lions on February 13, 2014.

=== Cleveland Browns ===
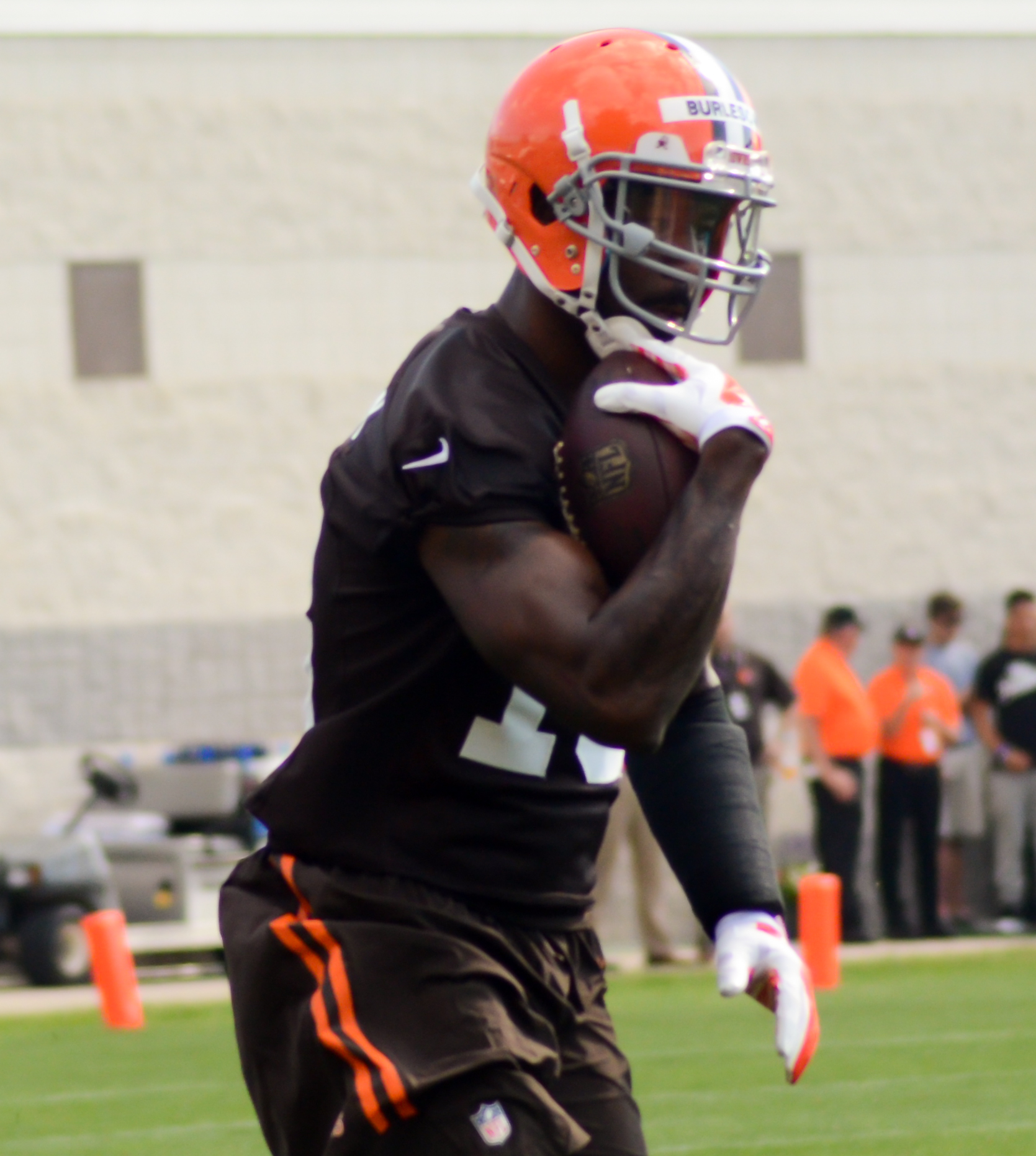
Burleson with the Browns in 2014

On April 6, 2014, Burleson signed a one-year deal with the Cleveland Browns, but was cut on August 30.

== NFL career statistics ==
Legend
| **Bold** | Career high |

=== Regular season ===
Receiving statistics

| Year | Team | GP | Rec | Tgt | Yds | Avg | Lng | TD | FD | Fum | Lost |
|---|---|---|---|---|---|---|---|---|---|---|---|
| 2003 | MIN | 16 | 29 | 57 | 455 | **15.7** | 52 | 2 | 17 | 1 | 1 |
| 2004 | MIN | 16 | 68 | 102 | **1,006** | 14.8 | **68** | **9** | **50** | 0 | 0 |
| 2005 | MIN | 12 | 30 | 52 | 328 | 10.9 | 20 | 1 | 20 | 0 | 0 |
| 2006 | SEA | 16 | 18 | 37 | 192 | 10.7 | 36 | 2 | 9 | 0 | 0 |
| 2007 | SEA | 16 | 50 | 96 | 694 | 13.9 | 45 | **9** | 37 | 1 | 1 |
| 2008 | SEA | 1 | 5 | 9 | 60 | 12.0 | 20 | 1 | 4 | 0 | 0 |
| 2009 | SEA | 13 | 63 | 103 | 812 | 12.9 | 44 | 3 | 42 | **2** | **2** |
| 2010 | DET | 14 | 55 | 86 | 625 | 11.4 | 58 | 6 | 32 | **2** | **2** |
| 2011 | DET | 16 | **73** | **110** | 757 | 10.4 | 47 | 3 | 36 | 1 | 1 |
| 2012 | DET | 6 | 27 | 43 | 240 | 8.9 | 26 | 2 | 14 | 0 | 0 |
| 2013 | DET | 9 | 39 | 55 | 461 | 11.8 | 47 | 1 | 23 | 1 | 0 |
| Career | | 135 | 457 | 750 | 5,630 | 12.3 | 68 | 39 | 284 | 8 | 7 |

Return stats

| Year | Team | GP | PR | Yds | TD | FC | Lng | KR | Yds | TD | Lng |
|---|---|---|---|---|---|---|---|---|---|---|---|
| 2003 | MIN | 16 | 1 | 0 | 0 | 0 | 0 | 0 | 0 | 0 | 0 |
| 2004 | MIN | 16 | 25 | 214 | **1** | **9** | 91 | 2 | 51 | 0 | 29 |
| 2005 | MIN | 12 | 5 | 21 | 0 | 0 | 10 | 0 | 0 | 0 | 0 |
| 2006 | SEA | 16 | 34 | 322 | **1** | 7 | 90 | 26 | **643** | 0 | 50 |
| 2007 | SEA | 16 | **58** | **658** | **1** | 8 | **94** | **27** | 590 | **1** | **91** |
| 2008 | SEA | 1 | 3 | 54 | 0 | 3 | 21 | 0 | 0 | 0 | 0 |
| 2009 | SEA | 13 | 30 | 254 | 0 | 3 | 29 | 1 | 2 | 0 | 2 |
| 2010 | DET | 14 | 0 | 0 | 0 | 0 | 0 | 1 | 0 | 0 | 0 |
| Career | | 104 | 156 | 1,523 | 3 | 30 | 94 | 57 | 1,286 | 1 | 91 |

=== Postseason ===
| Year | Team | Games | | Receiving | | | | | Fumbles | |
| Year | Team | GP | GS | Rec | Yds | Avg | Lng | TD | Fum | Lost |
|---|---|---|---|---|---|---|---|---|---|---|
| 2004 | MIN | 2 | 2 | 8 | **110** | 13.8 | **29** | **1** | 0 | 0 |
| 2006 | SEA | 2 | 0 | 1 | 16 | **16.0** | 16 | **1** | 0 | 0 |
| 2007 | SEA | 2 | 1 | **10** | 97 | 9.7 | 25 | 0 | 0 | 0 |
| 2011 | DET | 1 | 1 | 4 | 50 | 12.5 | 21 | 0 | 0 | 0 |
| Career | | 7 | 4 | 23 | 273 | 11.9 | 29 | 2 | 0 | 0 |

== Broadcasting career ==
=== NFL ===
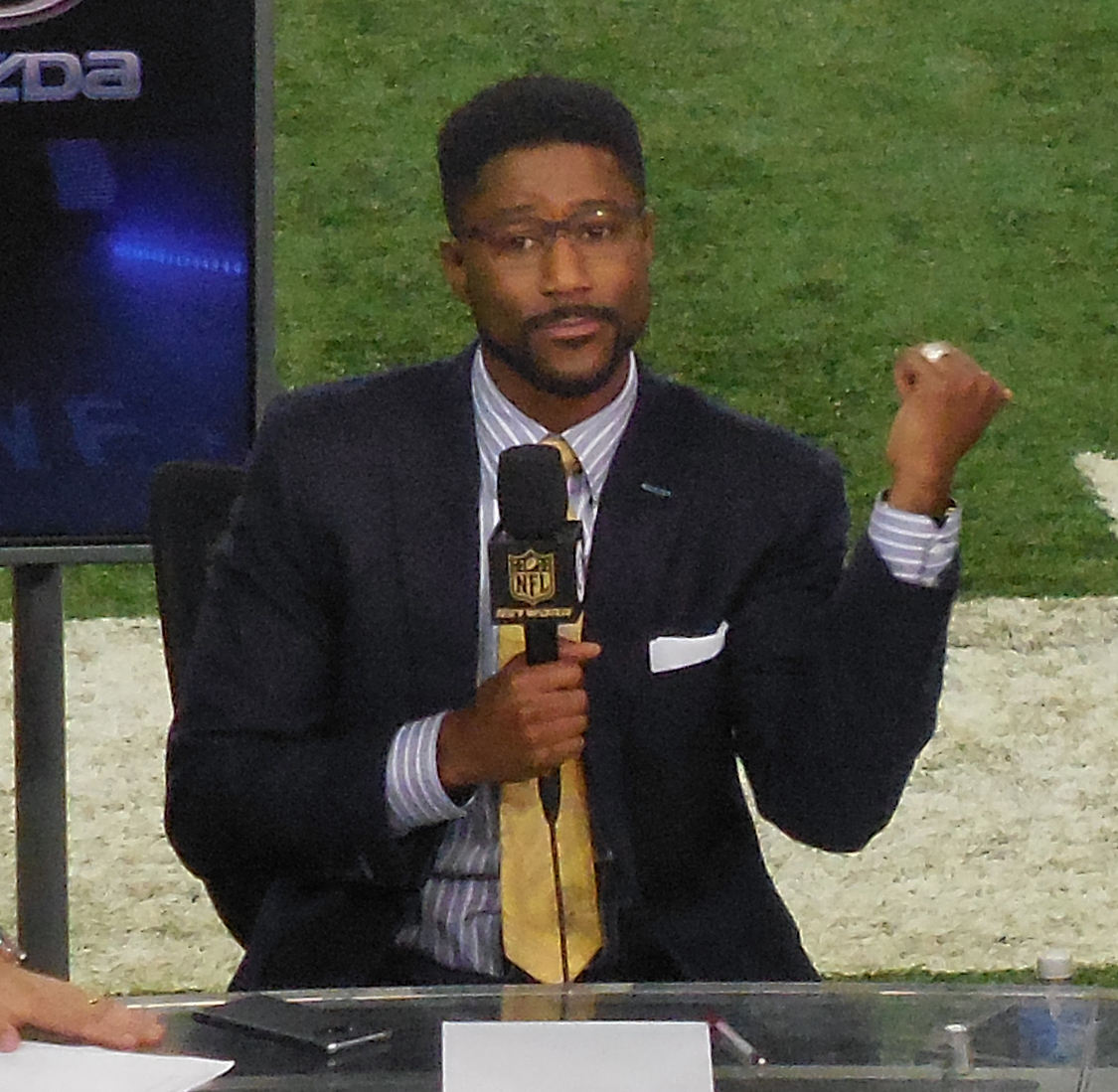
Burleson working for NFL Network in 2015

Burleson attended a Broadcast Boot Camp put on by the NFL in 2012. After his playing career ended in 2014, he began working as an analyst for the NFL Network. In 2015, Burleson was also a member of the Detroit Lions preseason broadcast team as a color commentator for the Detroit Lions Television Network. In 2016, Good Morning Football debuted on NFL Network with Burleson, Kay Adams, Kyle Brandt, and Peter Schrager as co-hosts. Burleson joined the NFL on CBS team as a studio analyst for The NFL Today for the 2017 season, while still serving as co-host of Good Morning Football. He is a two-time Sports Emmy Award winner for Outstanding Studio Analyst (2021 and 2022). Burleson made headlines after his pregame predictions for Super Bowl LVII, in which he predicted the correct final score with the Kansas City Chiefs defeating the Philadelphia Eagles 38–35; in addition to accurately picking Patrick Mahomes as the game's MVP.

=== CBS ===
Burleson expanded his work with CBS and its sister properties in 2021, first as the color commentator for the NFL Wild Card game airing on Nickelodeon then as host for the first season of The Challenge: All Stars reunion show on Paramount+. By August, CBS had named Burleson a co-anchor for CBS Mornings, a retooling of CBS This Morning, alongside Gayle King and Tony Dokoupil. He also continued with Nickelodeon as a host of its new weekly highlights show NFL Slimetime and reteamed with Noah Eagle and Gabrielle Nevaeh Green on the network's 2022 Wild Card broadcast. The trio also called Nickelodeon's Christmas Day broadcast later in the year. The network later announced that Burleson would co-host the 2023 Kids' Choice Awards with social media superstar Charli D'Amelio. On June 11, 2024, it was announced that Burleson would host a revival of the classic game show Hollywood Squares, which premiered on January 16, 2025. On February 19, 2026, it was announced that Burleson would replace Ernie Johnson for the first two weeks of March Madness coverage, as Johnson announced his semi-retirement from hosting March Madness to focus on his increasing Inside the NBA duties for ESPN and ABC, with Johnson only hosting the Final Four and National Championship Game.

=== Charlie Kirk assassination ===
During an interview on CBS Mornings a day after the assassination of Charlie Kirk, Burleson asked former Republican House Speaker Kevin McCarthy if it was "a moment for your party to reflect on political violence" and "for us to think about the responsibility of our political leaders and their voices and what it does to the masses as they get lost in misinformation or disinformation that turns in and spills in to political violence?" The timing and tone of Burleson's question to McCarthy led to criticism of him by some members of the conservative media, most notably Megyn Kelly.

== Personal life ==
Burleson and his wife Atoya have two sons, Nathaniel and Nehemiah, and a daughter, Mia, who appears on NFL Slimetime as a contributor.

Burleson rapped on multiple songs by Wizdom under the moniker "New Balance".

Burleson was a central figure in the 2005 Minnesota Vikings boat party scandal.

== See also ==
- List of NCAA major college football yearly receiving leaders

Media offices
| Preceded by John "DC Young Fly" Whitfield; 2023 Celebrity Squares | Host of Hollywood Squares; 2025 | Succeeded by Incumbent |
