= List of programs broadcast by the Nick Jr. Channel =

Nick Jr. Channel logo, used on-air since 2023

The following is a list of programs broadcast by the Nick Jr. Channel. It was launched on September 28, 2009, as a spin-off of Nickelodeon's long-running preschool programming block of the same name, which has aired since 1988. The channel features original series and reruns of programming from Nickelodeon's weekday morning lineup. A late-night programming block aimed at mothers, NickMom, aired on Nick Jr. from October 1, 2012 to September 28, 2015.

The channel replaced Noggin, which was relaunched as a streaming service in 2015 and acted as a separate sister brand. Noggin's programming is distinct from the Nick Jr. channel's; Noggin mainly carried pre-teen-oriented programs at its launch in 1999, and its 2015 streaming service featured a variety of exclusive series for preschoolers, before its shutdown in July 2024.

== Current programming ==
- ^{1} Also aired on Nick Jr. on CBS/Nick on CBS.

=== Original programming ===
Title	Premiere date	Source(s)
Team Umizoomi	January 31, 2010	(Note: Ended but still airing reruns.)
Bubble Guppies	January 30, 2011	
Blaze and the Monster Machines	October 19, 2014	
Tim Rex in Space*	August 4, 2025	

=== Acquired programming ===
Title	Premiere date	Source(s)
Peppa Pig*	February 5, 2011	(Note: Nickelodeon is named in the credits, but Nickelodeon's studios did not produce the show.)
Paw Patrol*	September 15, 2013	
Deer Squad*	January 25, 2021	
Rubble & Crew*	February 3, 2023	
Gabby's Dollhouse*	May 1, 2023	
Hamsters of Hamsterdale	October 16, 2024	
Joann Sfar's Mr. Crocodile*	February 23, 2026	
Bedtime Stories with Ryan	March 2, 2026	
The Marsupilamis	October 19, 2026	
My Friend Maisy	November 21, 2026	
It's Andrew!	November 21, 2026	

=== Programming from Paramount+ ===
Title	Premiere date	Source(s)
Dora*	August 5, 2024	

== Upcoming programming ==
=== Original programming ===
Title	Premiere date	Source(s)
HexVets and Magic Pets	2026	

== Former programming ==
=== Original programming ===
An asterisk (*) indicates that the program had new episodes that aired on the Nick Jr. Channel.

Title	Premiere date	End date	Source(s)
Blue's Clues^{1}	September 28, 2009	July 1, 2019	(Note: The show previously aired on the Nick Jr. block and Noggin. It premiered on the Nick Jr. Channel on its launch date, September 28, 2009.)
Little Bill^{1}	September 28, 2009	February 21, 2014	
Dora the Explorer*^{1}	September 28, 2009	December 25, 2024	
Oswald^{1} (Note: Co-produced by Nickelodeon Animation Studio and HIT Entertainment. Both companies co-own the copyright.)	September 28, 2009	December 11, 2014	
The Backyardigans*^{1}	September 28, 2009	August 30, 2018	
Go, Diego, Go!*^{1}	September 28, 2009	August 31, 2018	
Wonder Pets!*	September 28, 2009	August 30, 2018	
Ni Hao, Kai-Lan*	September 28, 2009	September 30, 2016	
The Fresh Beat Band*	September 28, 2009	July 2, 2016	
Gullah Gullah Island	October 2, 2009	December 5, 2014	
Blue's Room	December 24, 2009	February 13, 2011	
Wallykazam!*	February 9, 2014	October 3, 2025	
Dora and Friends: Into the City!*	October 4, 2014	October 18, 2021	
Fresh Beat Band of Spies*	June 15, 2015	October 29, 2021	
Winx Club*	August 3, 2015	August 23, 2016	(Note: Nickelodeon Animation Studio produced the Winx Club revival series, made up of seasons 5-7, in co-development with Rainbow. Paramount owns the copyright to these seasons and, until 2023, co-owned the Rainbow studio itself.)
Mutt & Stuff*	July 10, 2015	September 1, 2018	
Shimmer and Shine*	August 24, 2015	October 29, 2021	
Nella the Princess Knight*	February 6, 2017	December 15, 2019	
Sunny Day*	August 14, 2017	December 15, 2019	
Zoofari*	February 5, 2018	October 19, 2018	
Butterbean's Café*	November 13, 2018	August 28, 2026	
Blue's Clues & You!*	November 11, 2019	May 1, 2026	
Santiago of the Seas*	October 10, 2020	October 16, 2026	
Baby Shark's Big Show!*	December 12, 2020	February 12, 2025	(Note: Co-produced by Nickelodeon Animation Studio and The Pinkfong Company. The Pinkfong Company owns the characters and other elements in the show while Paramount retains half of the show's copyright.)
Face's Music Party*	June 6, 2022	December 30, 2023	
The Tiny Chef Show*	September 9, 2022	March 6, 2025	
Bossy Bear*	March 6, 2023	February 29, 2024	
Super Duper Bunny League	June 16, 2025	July 5, 2025	

=== Acquired programming ===
Title	Premiere date	End date	Source(s)
Franklin^{1}	September 28, 2009	June 14, 2013	
Little Bear^{1}	September 28, 2009	August 31, 2018	
Maggie and the Ferocious Beast^{1}	September 28, 2009	October 30, 2010	
Max & Ruby*	September 28, 2009	May 1, 2023	
LazyTown^{1}	September 28, 2009	July 19, 2010	
Miss Spider's Sunny Patch Friends^{1}	September 28, 2009	December 12, 2014	
Yo Gabba Gabba!*	September 28, 2009	October 24, 2016	
Olivia*	September 28, 2009	October 30, 2015	
Pinky Dinky Doo	September 28, 2009	April 8, 2011	
Toot & Puddle*	September 28, 2009	November 30, 2012	
Wow! Wow! Wubbzy!*	September 28, 2009	April 14, 2014	
64 Zoo Lane	October 5, 2009	December 28, 2009	
Dino Dan*	October 17, 2010	March 9, 2017	
Pocoyo	July 23, 2011	December 27, 2014	
Franklin and Friends*	March 1, 2012	March 29, 2019	
Mike the Knight*	March 1, 2012	November 30, 2018	
Tickety Toc*	September 10, 2012	August 30, 2018	
Peter Rabbit*	December 14, 2012	June 10, 2019	
Lalaloopsy*	March 29, 2013	October 2, 2016	
Julius Jr.	September 29, 2013	August 9, 2015	
Zack & Quack*	April 5, 2014	September 21, 2018	
Mia and Me	May 3, 2014	December 25, 2016	
Little Charmers*	January 12, 2015	August 30, 2018	
Ben & Holly's Little Kingdom	October 5, 2015	December 28, 2018	
Teletubbies	May 30, 2016	August 17, 2018	
Hey Duggee*	July 11, 2016	November 11, 2022	
Miffy's Adventures Big and Small	October 3, 2016	June 16, 2019	
Rusty Rivets*	November 8, 2016	January 1, 2021	
Digby Dragon	January 23, 2017	June 8, 2018	
Kuu Kuu Harajuku*	February 3, 2017	February 2, 2018	
Top Wing*	November 6, 2017	July 2, 2020	
Thomas & Friends*	December 15, 2017	December 27, 2019	
Cleo & Cuquin	January 22, 2018	January 18, 2019	
Becca's Bunch	September 24, 2018	May 10, 2019	
Rainbow Rangers*	November 5, 2018	October 29, 2021	
Abby Hatcher*	January 1, 2019	April 2, 2022	
Corn & Peg*	March 4, 2019	October 9, 2020	
Ryan's Mystery Playdate	June 10, 2019	April 16, 2023	
Ricky Zoom*	September 14, 2019	March 31, 2021	
Trulli Tales	October 5, 2019	May 14, 2020	
The Adventures of Paddington*	December 22, 2019	February 21, 2025	
JoJo & Gran Gran	May 28, 2021	May 29, 2022	
The Beatbuds, Let's Jam!	June 7, 2021	July 16, 2021	
Kiri & Lou*	June 13, 2022	June 21, 2024	
Vida the Vet*	July 7, 2025	August 22, 2025	

=== Programming from Noggin and "Noggin Hour" block ===
Title	Premiere date	End date	Source(s)
Jack's Big Music Show	September 28, 2009	December 26, 2014	(Note: The show previously aired on Noggin. It premiered on the Nick Jr. Channel on its launch date, September 28, 2009.)
Oobi	September 28, 2009	March 18, 2013	
The Upside Down Show	September 28, 2009	March 1, 2012	(Note: Co-produced by Noggin LLC and Sesame Workshop. Both companies co-own the copyright.)
Kinderwood	December 3, 2020	June 11, 2021	
Noggin Knows	June 4, 2021	July 30, 2021	

=== Programming from Nickelodeon ===
==== Animated ("Nicktoons") ====
Title	Premiere date	End date	Source(s)
Rugrats	July 12, 2014	July 28, 2014	
Harvey Beaks	May 1, 2016		
The Loud House	May 7, 2016	May 8, 2016	
Kung Fu Panda: Legends of Awesomeness	May 15, 2016		(Note: Co-produced by Nickelodeon Animation Studio and DreamWorks Animation. DreamWorks owns the characters and other elements in the show while Paramount retains half of the show's copyright.)
Rise of the Teenage Mutant Ninja Turtles	February 9, 2019	April 19, 2019	(Note: Nickelodeon acquired the Teenage Mutant Ninja Turtles franchise in 2009. Paramount owns the copyright to both the 2012 series and Rise of the Teenage Mutant Ninja Turtles.)
Kamp Koral: SpongeBob's Under Years	November 13, 2022		
Monster High	September 18, 2023	October 27, 2023	

=== Acquired programming from Nickelodeon ===
==== Animated ====
Title	Premiere date	End date	Source(s)
Mysticons	September 23, 2017	April 2, 2018	
Regal Academy	November 5, 2017	May 27, 2018	
Alvinnn!!! and the Chipmunks	April 21, 2018	August 31, 2018	
44 Cats	May 25, 2019	January 3, 2020	
Lego City Adventures	July 15, 2019	October 26, 2020	
The Smurfs	February 28, 2022	July 17, 2023	

=== Special programming ===
Title	Premiere date	End date	Source(s)
Worldwide Day of Play	2010	September 28, 2019	

=== Interstitial programming ===
- All Together Now (2012–15)
- Art Alive (2009–10)
- Arts and Crafts (2009–12)
- Bedtime Business (2009–15)
- The Big Green Help (2009–10)
- Canticos (2018)
- Chickiepoo and Fluff: Barnyard Detectives (2009–12)
- Count It Up (2012–15)
- Critter Corner (2009–12)
- Field Trip (2009–12)
- Get A Move On (2012–15)
- Get Creative (2012–15)
- Getting Going (2009–12)
- Moose and Zee (mascots; 2009 – March 1, 2012)
- Move to the Music (2009–12)
- Nickelodeon Music (2012–15)
- Nick Jr. Presents (2009–12)
- The Olive Branch (2010–12)
- Peppa Pig (shorts; 2009 – February 4, 2011)
- Pocoyo (shorts; 2010 – July 22, 2011)
- Nick Jr. Show and Tell
- Say it 2 Ways (2009–15)
- Show and Tell (2009–10)
- Story Time (2009–15)
- SuperSonic Science (2012–15)
- Well Versed (2023)
- Word of the Day (2012–15)
- Word Play (2012–15)
- WorldWide (2012–15)

=== NickMom ===
==== Original programming ====
Title	Premiere date	End date	Source(s)
Instant Mom	September 29, 2013	September 27, 2015	
MFF: Mom Friends Forever	October 1, 2012	September 25, 2015	
NickMom Night Out	October 1, 2012	September 25, 2015	
Parental Discretion with Stefanie Wilder-Taylor	October 1, 2012	September 25, 2015	
Take Me to Your Mother	May 6, 2013	September 25, 2015	
Undercover Cupid	August 21, 2014	September 25, 2015	
What Was Carol Brady Thinking?	October 1, 2012	February 28, 2013	

==== Acquired programming ====
Parenthood was acquired and exclusive to NickMom. Other series were acquired via Nick at Nite.

Title	Premiere date	End date	Source(s)
Parenthood	April 3, 2015	September 27, 2015	
The New Adventures of Old Christine	September 9, 2013	March 28, 2015	
That '70s Show	October 12, 2014	September 10, 2015	
Hangin' with Mr. Cooper	October 15, 2014	April 11, 2015	
Yes, Dear	February 3, 2013	May 2, 2015	

==== Programming from Nickelodeon ====
===== Animated ("Nicktoons") =====
Title	Premiere date	End date	Source(s)
Rugrats	March 7, 2013	March 8, 2013	

==== Programming from various Paramount networks ====
Title	Premiere date	End date	Source(s)
See Dad Run	January 1, 2013	September 27, 2015	
MFF: Mom Friends Forever	September 21, 2014	September 27, 2015	
Run's House	October 11, 2014	September 27, 2015	
The Exes	2015	September 27, 2015	
Hot in Cleveland	2015	September 27, 2015	
The Soul Man	2015	September 27, 2015	
Younger	2015	September 27, 2015	

== See also ==
- List of programs broadcast by Nickelodeon
- List of programs broadcast by Nick at Nite
- List of programs broadcast by Nicktoons
- List of programs broadcast by TeenNick
- List of films broadcast by Nickelodeon
