= Lucy Fry =

Australian actress (born 1992)

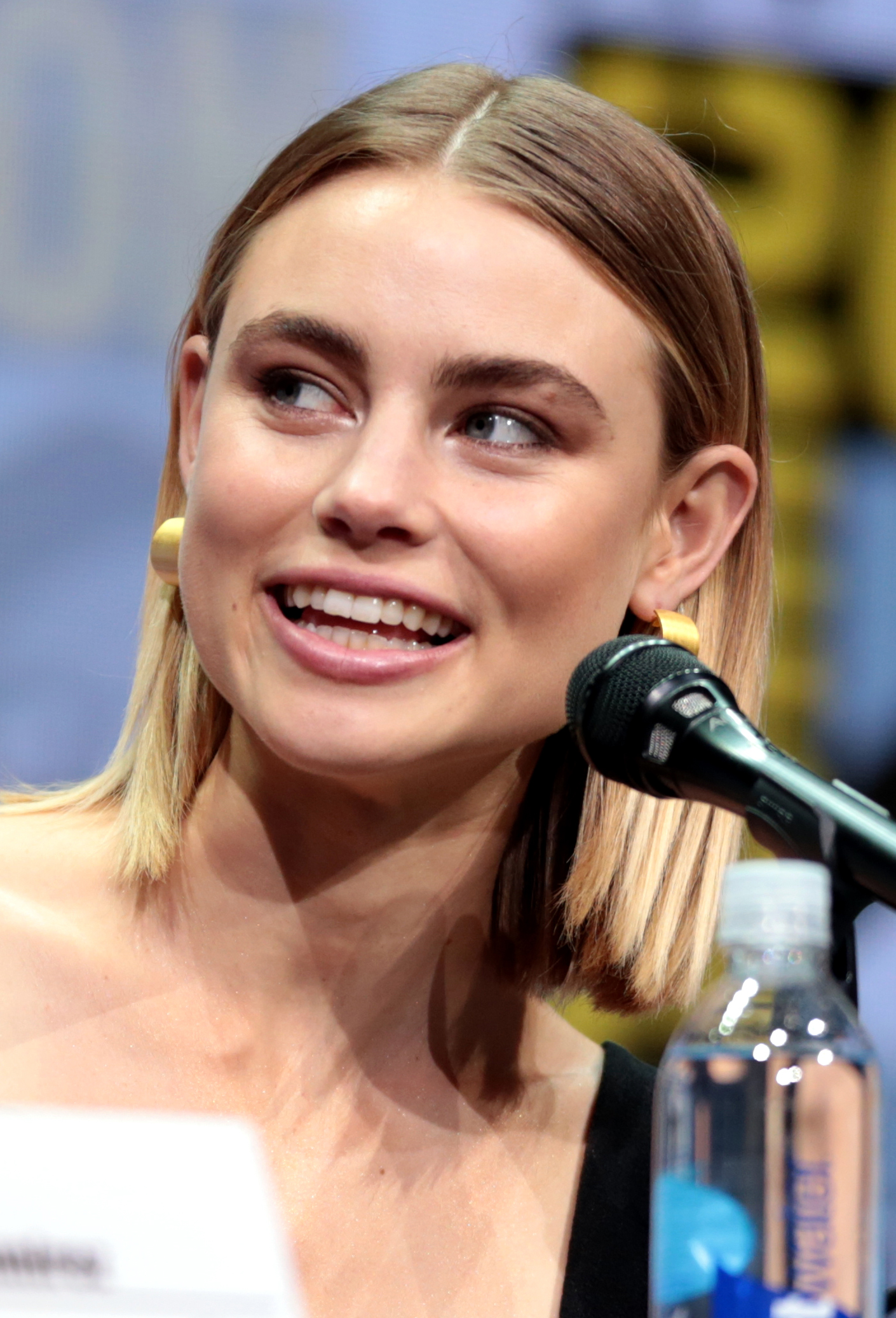
- Fry in 2017
- Born: Lucy Elizabeth Fry; 13 March 1992 (age 34); Wooloowin, Queensland, Australia
- Occupation: Actress
- Years active: 2007–present

Lucy Elizabeth Fry (born 13 March 1992) is an Australian actress. She is known for portraying Zoey in Lightning Point, Lyla in Mako: Island of Secrets, and Lissa Dragomir in the film Vampire Academy. Fry was also cast in Hulu's eight part miniseries 11.22.63 as Marina Oswald, wife of Lee Harvey Oswald, and played the lead in the 2016 Australian horror television series Wolf Creek and Tikka in the 2017 Netflix film Bright. Since 2019, she has portrayed Stella Gigante in the Epix series Godfather of Harlem.

== Early life ==
Fry was born in Brisbane, Queensland, Australia in 1992. She attended Brisbane Girls Grammar School in Brisbane, Queensland, and began studying theatre at an early age, training with the Brisbane-based physical theatre company, Zen Zen Zo. In 2007, she was a runner-up in Girlfriend Magazine's Model Search.

== Career ==
She made an uncredited appearance in the season 3 finale of H_{2}O: Just Add Water, in 2010. Her first major role on television was as Zoey in Lightning Point. From there she moved on to play Lyla, one of the lead mermaid roles, in season 1 of Mako: Island of Secrets, a spin-off of H_{2}O: Just Add Water.

In 2014, she had her first big screen roles, as Lissa Dragomir in Vampire Academy and as Honey in Now Add Honey. In 2015, Fry co-starred in The Preppie Connection opposite Thomas Mann, playing the role of Alex. In 2016, she appeared in the films Mr. Church, with Eddie Murphy and Britt Robertson, and The Darkness, with Kevin Bacon. The same year, she played lead character Eve Thorogood in the Australian miniseries Wolf Creek. She also starred in 11.22.63 playing Marina, the wife of Lee Harvey Oswald. In October 2016, Fry was cast as Tikka, a young elf who possess powers over a magical wand, in the 2017 fantasy film Bright alongside Will Smith and Joel Edgerton. In July 2017, Fry was cast to star as Heidi in the film She's Missing alongside Eiza González.

In July 2019, she joined the cast of Last Looks, an American-British action thriller by Tim Kirkby, based on a novel Last Looks by Howard Michael Gould. In the same year, she was seen as Stella Gigante in the crime drama television series Godfather of Harlem, which premiered in September 2019 on Epix. In February 2020, it was announced that she would star in Netflix thriller film Night Teeth.

== Filmography ==
=== Film ===
Year	Title	Role	Notes	Ref.
2014	Vampire Academy	Lissa Dragomir		
2015	Now Add Honey	Honey Halloway		
2015	The Preppie Connection	Alex Hayes		
2016	Mr. Church	Poppy	Originally titled Henry Joseph Church	
2016	The Darkness	Stephanie Taylor	Originally titled 6 Miranda Drive	
2017	Bright	Tikka	Direct-to-streaming film	
2019	She's Missing	Heidi		
2021	Night Teeth	Zoé Moreau	Direct-to-streaming film	
2022	Last Looks	Jayne White	Originally titled Waldo	
2025	I Live Here Now	Rose		
TBA	Samo Lives		Post-production	

=== Television ===
Year	Title	Role	Notes	Ref.
2010	H_{2}O: Just Add Water	Student at Graduation	Episode: "Graduation"; uncredited	
2012	Lightning Point	Zoey	Main role	
2013	Reef Doctors	Josie	Episode: "Episode Five"	
2013	Mako: Island of Secrets	Lyla	Main role (season 1)	
2016	11.22.63	Marina Oswald	Main role	
2016	Wolf Creek	Eve Thorogood	Lead role Nominated – Fangoria Chainsaw Award for Best TV Actress (2017)	
2019–present	Godfather of Harlem	Stella Gigante	Main role	

=== Music video ===
- Thirsty Merc (2010) by Tommy and Krista

== Theatre ==
Year	Work	Role
2007	A Water Story	Ancient Mariner
2007	Mr A's Amazing Maze Plays	Suzie
2007	The Show Must Go On	Doll
2008	A Midsummer Night's Dream	Thisbe
2008	Playing Pictures	Roving Performer
2008	Invisible Journeys	Lucy
2008	Ramalama	Physical Performer
2009	Beach	Serena
2009	Creative Generations	Lion Fish
2009	King Oedipus	Messenger
2010	Lost Baggage	Roving Performer
