= Popular Mechanics (disambiguation) =

Popular Mechanics is an American science and technology magazine.

Popular Mechanics may also refer to:

- "Popular Mechanics" (short story), by Raymond Carver
- Popular Mechanics (album), by Piano Magic
- "Popular Mechanics", an episode of the TV series Instant Mom
- Pop-Mechanics, a Russian musical collective
