= So I Married an Axe Murderer =

1993 American dark comedy film by Thomas Schlamme

- Theatrical release poster
- Directed by: Thomas Schlamme
- Written by: Robbie Fox
- Produced by: Robert N. Fried; Cary Woods
- Starring: Mike Myers; Nancy Travis; Anthony LaPaglia; Amanda Plummer; Brenda Fricker
- Cinematography: Julio Macat
- Edited by: Colleen Halsey; Richard Halsey
- Music by: Bruce Broughton
- Distributed by: TriStar Pictures
- Release date: July 30, 1993
- Running time: 93 minutes
- Country: United States
- Language: English
- Budget: $20 million
- Box office: $27 million

So I Married an Axe Murderer is a 1993 American romantic black comedy film, directed by Thomas Schlamme, and starring Mike Myers and Nancy Travis. Myers plays Charlie MacKenzie, a man afraid of commitment until he meets Harriet (Travis), who owns and operates a butcher shop, and who may be a serial killer. Myers also plays Stuart, Charlie's father. The film received a mixed reception from critics and did not fare well at the box office, grossing $27 million, but it has gained a cult following in the years since its release. A miniseries called The Pentaverate, created by Myers and based on the in-universe conspiracy theories mentioned in this film, was released in May 2022 on Netflix.

== Plot ==
Charlie MacKenzie is a popular local beat poet living in San Francisco who makes his frequent break-ups the subject of his poems. His best friend Tony, a recently promoted police detective, believes that Charlie is afraid of commitment and will identify (or invent) any reason to break up with someone.

While purchasing Haggis for his Scottish-born parents, Stuart and May, he encounters a butcher named Harriet, and is attracted to her. During his visit with his family, Charlie and May discuss his most recent break-up, and May brings up a tabloid article about a bride known as "Mrs. X", who kills her husbands on their honeymoons using an axe.

Charlie goes back to the butcher shop and offers to help Harriet. The two find common bonds and start to date. After staying at her place one night, Charlie meets Harriet's eccentric sister, Rose, who warns Charlie to be careful. He learns Harriet used to live in Atlantic City, was involved with a trainer in Russian martial arts, and screams for someone named Ralph in her sleep. Charlie arranges a dinner with her to meet his parents, who say she is their favourite of all his partners. Charlie reads the article about Mrs. X, which identifies two of her victims as a martial arts expert and a man named Ralph.

Charlie becomes fearful and asks Tony to investigate Harriet and the Mrs. X story. Tony reveals that the husbands of Mrs. X were all reported missing alongside their wives, assuring that Harriet is unlikely to be Mrs. X. Charlie remains on edge, and after a few more troubled dates, breaks up with her. Tony reports that a killer in the Mrs. X story has confessed. Relieved, Charlie apologizes to Harriet by reciting one of his beat poems to her from her rooftop. They make up, and Harriet explains away some of her history, such as Ralph being the name of a woman she knows.

At his parents' wedding anniversary Charlie proposes to Harriet. She accepts after some hesitation. Following the wedding ceremony, they embark on a honeymoon to a secluded mountain hotel. After they depart, Tony learns that the confessed killer is actually a compulsive liar. He sends a photo of Harriet to the known associates of the missing husbands, and all identify her as their friends' wife. With phone lines to the hotel down due to a storm, Tony charters a plane. Once he lands, he calls Charlie locally and warns him that Harriet really is Mrs. X, but the hotel phone line is knocked out and power is lost.

Charlie panics and tries to stay away from Harriet without letting her know what he knows, but the hotel staff force him into the honeymoon suite for their first night together. After locking Harriet in the closet, Charlie discovers a letter, purportedly written by him, explaining his absence to Harriet. Rose appears wielding an axe and reveals herself as the Mrs. X killer. She feels that Harriet's husbands are taking her sister from her, motivating her to kill them on their honeymoon night and leave letters behind claiming to be from them, leading Harriet to believe that each husband abandoned her. Charlie flees from Rose.

Tony leads the police into the hotel and arrests Harriet, still believing her to be the murderer. Charlie, having been chased to the hotel roof by Rose, gets Tony's attention as they take Harriet away. While the police make their way up to the roof, Rose swings the axe at Charlie and is thrown off the building. Tony catches her, and she is arrested and taken away. Charlie and Harriet resume their lives as a happy couple.

== Cast ==
- Mike Myers as:
  - Charlie MacKenzie
  - Stuart MacKenzie
- Nancy Travis as Harriet Michaels
- Anthony LaPaglia as Tony Giardino
- Amanda Plummer as Rose Michaels
- Brenda Fricker as May MacKenzie
- Michael Richards as Insensitive Man
- Matt Doherty as William "Heed" MacKenzie
- Charles Grodin as Commandeered Driver
- Phil Hartman as John "Vickie" Johnson, Alcatraz Tour Guide
- Debi Mazar as Susan, Tony's Girlfriend
- Steven Wright as Pilot
- Jessie Nelson as Ralph
- Alan Arkin as Tony's Captain (uncredited)
- Greg Germann as Concierge
- Kelvin Han Yee as Master Cho
- Patrick Bristow as Cafe Roads Performer
- Luenell as Police Records Officer
- Steve Dunleavy as Himself
- Mike Hagerty as Obituary Writer
- Paul Sanchez as Serenade Musician
- Glen Vernon as Uncle Angus
- Robert Nichols as Scottish Minister
- Sheila Kelley as Sherry
- Marla Sokoloff as Alcatraz Visitor
- Bob Sarlatte as Poet's Corner M.C.

== Production ==
The genesis of the film originated in 1987, when producer Robert N. Fried, who had recently left Orion Pictures to set up on his own, met with writer Robbie Fox to discuss story ideas. They ended up talking about the problems they had with women and agreed that "most women appeared to be out to destroy us!" Fried and co-producer Cary Woods formed their own production company in 1992. So I Married An Axe Murderer was their first film, for which they were given a $20 million budget. Fox wrote the screenplay in 1987. In the original version, Charlie was Jewish and, according to Fried, it was "initially conceived as being more about paranoia than commitment". Myers wanted changes to the script that would allow him to perform both serious acting and Saturday Night Live–style comedy.

He extensively rewrote the script with writer Neil Mullarkey, an old friend from Britain. According to Myers, they changed the story and many of the comedic moments. Fox was asked to consider a new set of credits that gave him a "story by" and co-screenplay credit. He rejected the proposal and in arbitration, the Writers Guild of America decided that Fox would receive sole screenwriting credit. Fried and Myers were upset that Mullarkey, who had put much work into the script, did not receive any credit.

=== Casting ===
Friend and co-producer Cary Woods asked Mike Myers to play Charlie MacKenzie because of the success he had with the film Wayne's World. He agreed because he liked the script, as many of his friends also had a fear of commitment, and "were all suffering from cold feet and what is cold feet but a low-grade terror? This story just expands on that terror." Before Myers was asked, Woody Allen considered playing Charlie. Chevy Chase, Albert Brooks, and Martin Short also considered the role but did not like the character. When the actors attended the first cast read-through of the script, Stuart had not yet been cast. Myers read the character's lines and the filmmakers so enjoyed his interpretation that they realized he could play that role as well.

Sharon Stone was initially set to play Harriet Michaels, the supposed axe murderer of the film's title. Like Myers, who has two roles in the film, Stone wanted to play both Harriet and Rose, (who ended up being played by Amanda Plummer). Studio executives at Sony did not like the idea of Stone playing both roles, and she therefore refused to accept the part. Nancy Travis, Fried's partner (and future wife), was then cast as Harriet. Travis was drawn to Harriet's "qualities of danger and compassion mixed with humor [which] make her an intriguing character."

Anthony LaPaglia said that his character "has grand illusions of being Serpico; you know he's ready to fight crime like his hero did. But he's just not competent." The film also features cameos by Charles Grodin, Phil Hartman, Michael Richards, Mike Hagerty, Debi Mazar, Steven Wright, and Alan Arkin, the latter appearing uncredited as Tony's sensitive boss. They all agreed to be in the film for the opportunity of working with Myers.

=== Principal photography ===
To fit both Charlie and his father in the same scene together, the filmmakers used a split-screen process. To play Stuart required Myers undergoing three to four hours of prosthetic makeup. While filming scenes in the butcher shop, Nancy Travis was distracted by Myers' antics and severed a fingertip on her left hand while chopping vegetables. A local doctor successfully re-attached the tip. Travis said that she and Myers frequently improvised together, and he taught her more about comedy and showed her "how to be relaxed and spontaneous on the set."

There were stories in the press that Myers' over-inflated ego forced extensive re-shoots on the film, and that he tried to deny Robbie Fox credit for writing the film. On the set, director Thomas Schlamme said that he had his differences with Myers over how the film should be shaped. He said that Myers was "taking a stretch beyond his usual self and was playing outside himself. Personality clashes were bound to happen. We struggled." The director denied that Myers was a control freak, and praised the "total commitment to his work. (But) yes, it was difficult." There were reports that the film went over budget, with in-fighting among the principal actors and lengthy release delays, and that it was unfunny. Despite these early reports, So I Married an Axe Murderer scored high at test screenings.

=== Locations ===
Set in San Francisco, California, the film features familiar sights and neighborhoods of the Golden State metropolis, including the Golden Gate Bridge, the Palace of Fine Arts and Alcatraz. One scene on Alcatraz was filmed in "A" block, an area that was unchanged from its 1912 configuration and is not open to the public. The space for actors, crew and equipment is narrow, a challenge also faced by the makers of The Rock, which features Nicolas Cage and Sean Connery as characters breaking in to the prison complex. The tiny Cloverdale Municipal Airport is also in the film.

The restaurant where Charlie and Harriet double-date with Tony and Susan is the Fog City Diner, which closed its doors in 2013. The butcher shop used for "Meats of the World" was Prudente Meats on Grant Avenue, in the North Beach Section of San Francisco.

The scene where Charlie breaks up with Harriet was set in Alamo Square, with the San Francisco skyline in the background.

The final scenes are set at Dunsmuir House in the East Oakland foothills. Additional special effects and matte paintings created the illusion that the location was secluded among mountains. The exterior shot for the café, Cafe Roads, where Myers recites his beat poetry, is the bar Vesuvio Cafe, at Columbus Avenue and Jack Kerouac Alley. The filmmakers set the story in San Francisco, which they viewed as an ideal place for a poet like Charlie to gravitate to.

Myers has said that he was attracted to its "coffeehouse culture, with its clothes and music and its whole sensibility ... people aren't going to bars as much. They tend to go out and have coffee." Several sets were built in warehouses near Candlestick Park, and these soundstages were used for many weeks.

=== Deleted scenes ===
At least two deleted scenes are known to exist - one filmed on BART, and an epilogue which revealed that Charlie and Harriet have a son named Stuart, after Charlie's father.

== Music ==
So I Married an Axe Murderer (Original Motion Picture Soundtrack)

Soundtrack album by Various artists
- Released: July 27, 1993
- Genre: Soundtrack
- Length: 39:14
- Label: Columbia

Professional ratings
Review scores
Source	Rating
AllMusic	2.5/5 stars

=== Soundtrack ===
1. Boo Radleys - "There She Goes" 2:18
2. Toad the Wet Sprocket - "Brother" 4:04
3. Soul Asylum - "The Break" 2:46
4. Chris Whitley - "Starve To Death" 3:14
5. Big Audio Dynamite II - "Rush" (New York City Club Version) 3:55
6. Mike Myers - "This Poem Sucks" 2:04
7. Ned's Atomic Dustbin - "Saturday Night" 3:08
8. The Darling Buds - "Long Day In The Universe" 4:08
9. The Spin Doctors - "Two Princes" 4:15
10. Suede - "My Insatiable One" 2:57
11. Sun-60 - "Maybe Baby" 3:43
12. The La's - "There She Goes" 2:42

=== Other music in the film ===
- The Bay City Rollers - "Saturday Night"
- Ron Gonnella - "A Touch of Gaelic"
- Rod Stewart - "Da Ya Think I'm Sexy?" (sung by Mike Myers as Stuart MacKenzie)
- The Platters - "Only You" (sung by Nancy Travis)

=== Score ===
The film's original score was composed and conducted by Bruce Broughton. Due to the film's emphasis on popular music, several of Broughton's cues were replaced with existing songs, such as his main title music being supplanted by The Boo Radleys' version of "There She Goes," and "Butcher Shop Montage" having Big Audio Dynamite's "Rush" substituted.

Broughton appreciated the support of music supervisor Danny Bramson and director Thomas Schlamme, stating "I was given the opportunity to make my case, and I didn't get slighted... But the way it ended up was the way it ended up. It was done with a lot of creative latitude, and creative permission and confidence. I can't complain about the way it came out."

Intrada Records released an album of his music on November 25, 2013, featuring the complete score, plus alternates and original versions of cues.

1. Main Title 2:55
2. Boy Meets Girl 1:09
3. Weekly World News 0:38
4. Butcher Shop Montage 1:58
5. Russian Stroll 2:23
6. Goin' For It 2:19
7. Forever Wet 1 1:00
8. Forever Wet 2 0:59
9. Creeping Doubt (Revised) 1:05
10. Ralph 1:05
11. Name Your Poison 1:12
12. Ear Needles (Revised) 0:45
13. Globe Bridge 1:08
14. Reflections 0:42
15. You Blew It 0:27
16. The Bath (Revised) 0:54
17. She's Guilty (Revised) 1:04
18. Wedding Bands 0:32
19. Inn Source #2 2:14
20. Stalking 0:42
21. She's Mrs. Axe (Revised) 0:57
22. The Finale 5:27
23. The Finale Part 2 3:13
24. End Theme 1:35
25. Go See The Folks 0:17
26. Dinner Drive (Original) 0:27
27. Goin' For It (Revised) 2:19
28. Creeping Doubt (Original) 1:05
29. Ear Needles (Original) 0:14
30. Globe Bridge (Alternate) 0:29
31. Second Thoughts 0:13
32. Second Thoughts (Revised) 0:12
33. The Bath 0:52
34. She's Guilty 1:05
35. She's Mrs. Axe 0:57
36. The Finale Part 2 (Alternate) 2:26
37. Inn Source #1 (Haydn Quartet) 1:46
38. Inn Source #2 (Alternate) 1:32
39. Only You (And You Alone) 1:31

Total Time: 52:56

== Release ==
So I Married an Axe Murderer was first shown at a screening to benefit the local San Francisco film office, on July 27, 1993, at the Palace of Fine Arts Theater. It had its official world premiere at the Galaxy Theater in Hollywood on July 28, with Myers, Travis, and LaPaglia in attendance. The film did not perform well at the box office. It was released on July 30 in 1,349 theaters, and grossed $3.4 million during its opening weekend, and a total of $11.5 million in the United States and Canada. It grossed an estimated $15 million internationally for a worldwide total of $27 million.

== Reception ==
So I Married an Axe Murderer had a mixed critical reception. On Rotten Tomatoes it has an approval rating of 55% based on 40 reviews, with an average rating of 5.70/10. The critical consensus reads, "So I Married an Axe Murderer is a unique rom-com with moments of heart and hilarity—even if they're all too scattered to cohere into a consistent whole." On Metacritic, the film has a score of 54 out of 100 based on 30 reviews, indicating "mixed or average reviews". Audiences surveyed by CinemaScore gave the film a grade of "B" on scale of "A" to "F."

Roger Ebert, in his review for the Chicago Sun-Times, described the film as "a mediocre movie with a good one trapped inside, wildly signaling to be set free," believing the scenes focused on Charlie's friends and family were far superior to the axe-murder plot. He rated it two and a half stars out of four. Rolling Stone magazine's Peter Travers felt that "Juggling mirth, romance and murder requires a deft touch—think of Hitchcock's Trouble with Harry. Axe is a blunt instrument." Entertainment Weekly's reviewer gave the film a "C−" and said, "In some perverse way, So I Married an Axe Murderer seems to be asking us to laugh at how not-funny it is."

In a review for The Washington Post, Hal Hinson had a mixed reaction to Myers' performance, writing "Everything he does is charmingly lightweight and disposable and reasonably impossible to resist. And in the end, because the character is so easily within reach for him, you may come away feeling a little cheated, as if you hadn't quite seen a movie at all." However, Janet Maslin's review in The New York Times said that it came as "a welcome surprise that So I Married an Axe Murderer, which might have been nothing more than a by-the-numbers star vehicle, surrounds Mr. Myers with amusing cameos and gives him a chance to do more than just coast."

In his review for the San Francisco Chronicle, Edward Guthmann called the film a "trifle, at best—but it's so full of good spirits, and so rich with talented actors having a marvelous time, that its flaws tend to wash away."

== Home media ==
It was released on VHS and Laserdisc by Columbia TriStar Home Video on March 9, 1994. A DVD of the film was released in June 1999. The DVD artwork differed from the original film poster, which had Harriet holding an axe behind her back.

== Legacy ==
=== The Pentaverate ===
On April 17, 2019, it was announced that Netflix had picked up a then untitled six-episode miniseries from Myers where he will star as multiple characters. In June 2021, it was announced that the miniseries will be titled The Pentaverate, based on the film's conspiracy theories as discussed by Stuart and Tony as they peruse the Weekly World News. The series would feature Ken Jeong, Keegan-Michael Key, Mazar, Jennifer Saunders, and Lydia West, with Jeremy Irons serving as the narrator. Myers, Tim Kirkby, John Lyons, Tony Hernandez, Lilly Burns, and Jason Weinberg will serve as executive producers with the latter three through Jax Media.
