= Howard Michael Gould =

American screenwriter, playwright, and novelist

- Born: November 21, 1962 (age 63); New York City, U.S.
- Education: Amherst College
- Occupations: Novelist; television writer-producer; screenwriter
- Writing career
- Period: 1989–present
- Genres: Mystery, Comedy
- Notable works: Charlie Waldo detective novels, Instant Mom, Cybill
- Website: howardmichaelgould.com

Howard Michael Gould (born November 21, 1962) is an American novelist, television writer-producer, screenwriter, director, and playwright.

== Personal life ==
Gould was born in New York City. He graduated from Amherst College and spent five years working on Madison Avenue, winning three Clio Awards and numerous other awards. He currently lives in Los Angeles.

== Novels ==
Gould has written three crime/mystery novels in the Charlie Waldo series.

Last Looks is a mystery novel published in 2018. "The plot is good and the protagonist is even better," Kirkus wrote in a Starred Review. "It’s fast, funny, and well worth a sequel." Gould adapted the novel for a film of the same name, directed by Tim Kirkby, starring Charlie Hunnam and Mel Gibson.

Below the Line was published in August 2019. "Though Gould’s jaunty tone sometimes clashes with the story’s grim content, the entertaining characters are enough to keep readers turning the pages," Publishers Weekly wrote. "Fans of quirky PIs will find lots to like."

Pay or Play was published in December 2021. "Gould pithily slips in loads of relevant details about homelessness, consumerism, and waste on the way to the satisfying ending. Readers will want to see a lot more of the obsessively virtuous Waldo," wrote Publishers Weekly.

== Television ==
Gould got his start writing for situation comedies, including FM and Home Improvement. In 1993, he co-created the short-lived CBS series Cutters.

He joined the writing staff of Cybill in its second season, quickly rising to executive producer/showrunner with the departure of series creator Chuck Lorre. He later served in the same role for The Jeff Foxworthy Show.

Starting in 2012, Gould developed and ran Instant Mom, a comedy starring Tia Mowry-Hardrict and Michael Boatman. The show lasted 65 episodes and aired on Nick at Nite, Nick Mom and TV Land.

== Film ==
Gould co-wrote the screenplay for Mr. 3000, a sports comedy film that starred Bernie Mac and Angela Bassett.

He wrote and directed the 2009 film, The Six Wives of Henry Lefay.

== Theater ==
Gould wrote the play Diva, which premiered at the La Jolla Playhouse in 2001. It starred Susan Blakely as a one-time movie star who gets her own sitcom and proves difficult to handle. Annie Potts played the title role in a 2006 revival at the Pasadena Playhouse.
