= Last Looks =

2022 American-British mystery film

- Theatrical release poster
- Directed by: Tim Kirkby
- Screenplay by: Howard Michael Gould
- Based on: Last Looks by Howard Michael Gould
- Produced by: Brad Feinstein; Andrew Lazar; Steven Shainberg; Christina Weiss Lurie
- Starring: Charlie Hunnam; Mel Gibson; Morena Baccarin; Lucy Fry; Rupert Friend; Dominic Monaghan; Jacob Scipio; Clancy Brown
- Cinematography: Lyle Vincent
- Edited by: Joe Landauer; Nicholas Monsour
- Music by: Peter Nashel
- Production companies: Head Gear Films; Metrol Technology; Romulus Entertainment
- Distributed by: RLJE Films
- Release date: February 4, 2022
- Running time: 111 minutes
- Countries: United States; United Kingdom
- Language: English

Last Looks is a 2022 mystery film, directed by Tim Kirkby, from a screenplay by Howard Michael Gould based on his novel of the same name. It stars Charlie Hunnam, Mel Gibson, Morena Baccarin, Lucy Fry, Rupert Friend, Dominic Monaghan, Jacob Scipio and Clancy Brown.

== Plot ==
After spending three years without human contact in a remote trailer, former Detective Charlie Waldo returns to Los Angeles to investigate the murder of actor Alistair Pinch‘s wife. Initially unwilling to take the case, he agrees to stay for one day after his ex-girlfriend Lorena went missing.

After Alistair is arrested as the prime suspect, Charlie is lured back to his trailer by gangster Don Q, who claims that Lorena secretly stashed a “mem“ in the trailer. He gives Charlie an ultimatum: to retrieve the mem within 24 hours. Charlie deduces that Alistair‘s wife was killed with one of his missing acting awards and that furniture at the crime scene was moved, casting doubts on the theory believed by the police. The police reveal to him that Lorena was seemingly killed over the mem and fixer Warren Gomes attempts to pressure him off the case.

Charlie storms a party hosted by billionaire Darius Jamshidi, Gomes‘s employer. The next day, Charlie confronts Don Q over Lorena‘s murder, but is knocked out by his henchman. He receives a message from Lorena, who faked her death and hid the “mem”, a memory stick, on his property. Charlie learns that both men ordering attacks him, Jamshidi and gangsta rapper Swag Doggg, have kids in the same class as Alistair. He finds out that all three men had affairs with nymphomaniac school teacher Jayne White and attack him to keep it secret, while Alistair even got her pregnant.

Charlie has now deduced the real killer: Wilson Sikorsky, Alistair‘s boss and his employer. He had an affair with Alistair‘s wife and killed her after she threatened to tell Alistair about the affair and force him to move back to England with her. He hired Charlie because he thought the disgraced detective wouldn’t uncover the mystery and make Alistair take the Fall. After Gomes blackmailed him, he killed him, too. Sikorsky flees but is killed by Q, who reveals that on the memory stick is an epic poem he wrote. Charlie and Lorena reunite.

== Cast ==
- Charlie Hunnam as Charlie Waldo
- Mel Gibson as Alastair Pinch
- Morena Baccarin as Lorena Nascimento
- Lucy Fry as Jayne White
- Rupert Friend as Wilson Sikorsky
- Dominic Monaghan as Warren Gomes
- Jacob Scipio as Don Q
- Clancy Brown as Big Jim Cuppy
- Paul Ben-Victor as Lieutenant Pete Conady
- Method Man as Swag Doggg
- David Pasquesi as Darius Jamshidi
- Robin Givens as Fontella Davis
- Josh McDermitt as Director
- Steve Coulter as Dr. Sebastian Hexter
- Deacon Randle as Nini
- Rachel Hendrix as Valerie
- David Michael-Smith as Bailiff Canavan
- Xen Sams as Allie Jamshidi

== Production ==
In October 2018, Charlie Hunnam, Mel Gibson and Eiza González joined the cast of the film, then titled Waldo, with Tim Kirkby directing from a screenplay by Howard Michael Gould. In June 2019, Jacob Scipio, Dominic Monaghan, Clancy Brown, Morena Baccarin, and Paul Ben-Victor joined the cast of the film. In July 2019, Lucy Fry joined the cast of the film. In August 2019, Rupert Friend and Method Man joined the cast of the film. The film was retitled from Waldo to Last Looks in June 2020. In December 2021, RLJE Films acquired North American rights to the film and set it for a February 2022 release.

Principal photography began in Atlanta on June 18, 2019.

== Release ==
Last Looks was released on February 4, 2022.

== Reception ==
On the review aggregator website Rotten Tomatoes, 68% of 38 critics' reviews are positive, with an average rating of 5.8/10. The website's consensus reads: "A mostly well-cast caper brightened by colorful characters, Last Looks may not be the most compelling mystery, but it's reasonably compelling in the moment." Metacritic, which uses a weighted average, assigned the film a score of 49 out of 100, based on eight critics, indicating "mixed or average" reviews.
