= Stanley Myron Handelman =

American stand-up comedian (1929–2007)

- Born: November 21, 1929; Brooklyn, New York, U.S.
- Died: August 5, 2007 (aged 77); Panorama City, California, U.S.
- Children: 5

Comedy career
- Years active: 1950s–2007
- Medium: Television, stage
- Genre: Stand-up comedy

Stanley Myron Handelman (November 21, 1929 – August 5, 2007) was an American stand-up comedian who, during a ten-year period between 1965 and 1975, appeared on numerous television variety shows.

== Early years ==
The Brooklyn-born Handelman was a late 1960s fixture on programs such as The Merv Griffin Show, Dean Martin Presents the Golddiggers, The Barbara McNair Show, The Flip Wilson Show, The Ed Sullivan Show and The Tonight Show Starring Johnny Carson, and films such as Harvey Middleman, Fireman (1965) and Linda Lovelace for President (1975).

His stooped, resigned appearance and surreal sense of humor ("I just got up from a sick bed. I don't know what's wrong with it—it just lies there") made him a highly-recognizable celebrity on the talk show circuit and resulted in about ten appearances on Johnny Carson. After the demise of the TV variety shows, he accepted a handful of acting roles and subsequently taught the art of selling Porsches in Los Angeles.

== Marriages ==
Handelman married four times, and had four sons and one daughter. They are Paul, Michael, Robert and Daniel, and his daughter, Stefanie Wilder-Taylor.

== Death ==
He died on August 5, 2007, in his Panorama City, California, home in the San Fernando Valley from a heart attack. He was 77.
