= She's Missing =

2018 film

- Film poster
- Directed by: Alexandra McGuinness
- Written by: Alexandra McGuinness
- Produced by: Eamonn Cleary; Anna O'Malley; Dominic Wright
- Starring: Lucy Fry; Eiza González
- Cinematography: Gareth Munden
- Edited by: Mairead McIvor
- Music by: David Harrington
- Production companies: Ripple World Pictures; TW Films
- Release date: March 1, 2019 (DIFF)
- Running time: 100 minutes
- Country: United States
- Language: English

She's Missing (originally titled Highway) is a 2019 psychological thriller drama film written and directed by Alexandra McGuinness and starring Lucy Fry and Eiza González. The film premiered at the Virgin Media Dublin International Film Festival in March 2019.

== Plot ==
The abduction of a rodeo queen and military wife sends her best friend on a search through the hostile desert and a host of unseemly characters.

== Cast ==
- Lucy Fry as Heidi
- Eiza González as Jane
- Christian Camargo as Lyle
- Josh Hartnett as Ren
- Blake Berris as Gus
- Sheila Vand as Cherry
- Antonia Campbell-Hughes as Marina
- C. J. Wallace as Taylor
- Olivia Spinelli as Chalet

== Production ==
Principal photography began on mid-July 2017 in Ruidoso, Albuquerque, and Moriarty, New Mexico. Filming wrapped in August 2017.

== Reception ==
On review aggregator Rotten Tomatoes, the film holds an approval rating of 67% based on 15 reviews, with an average rating of 5.8/10.
