= Brockmire =

2017 American television comedy series

- Genre: Sitcom
- Based on: Character created by Hank Azaria
- Developed by: Joel Church-Cooper
- Directed by: Tim Kirkby; Maurice Marable
- Starring: Hank Azaria; Amanda Peet; Tyrel Jackson Williams; J. K. Simmons; Tawny Newsome; Reina Hardesty
- Composer: Adam Blau
- Country of origin: United States
- Original language: English
- No. of seasons: 4
- No. of episodes: 32

Production
- Executive producers: Hank Azaria; Tim Kirkby; Joel Church-Cooper; Mike Farah; Joe Farrell
- Camera setup: Single-camera
- Running time: 21–23 minutes
- Production companies: Funny or Die; How 2 Pictures

Original release
- Network: IFC
- Release: April 5, 2017 – May 6, 2020

Brockmire is an American sitcom that premiered on April 5, 2017, on IFC. The show stars Hank Azaria, Amanda Peet, and Tyrel Jackson Williams, with J. K. Simmons guest starring in the third season. Azaria plays a baseball play-by-play announcer based on a character he created for a comedy web series in 2010. IFC renewed the series for a third season and a final fourth season. The series finale aired on May 6, 2020.

== Premise ==
Brockmire follows Jim Brockmire, "a famous Major League Baseball announcer who suffers an embarrassing public meltdown on the air after discovering his wife's serial infidelity. A decade later, he tries to reclaim his career and love life in a small town, calling minor league ball for the Morristown, Pennsylvania Frackers."

In the second season, Brockmire becomes the play-by-play announcer for the AAA New Orleans Crawdaddys.

== Cast and characters ==
=== Main ===
- Hank Azaria as Jim Brockmire, an alcoholic, drug-using former Kansas City broadcaster fired in 2007 for an on-air tirade against his unfaithful wife (along with a press conference where he tries to set things right but only makes them worse). In the ten years since, he spent most of his time in Asian countries calling non-traditional sporting events, such as cock-fighting.
- Amanda Peet as Jules James, the owner of the Morristown Frackers (formerly Savages), which her father originally owned, along with the town's main bar. She is competitive and will do anything to attract fans to the games. (seasons 1, 4; recurring, seasons 2–3)
- Tyrel Jackson Williams as Charles, the Frackers head of digital media, responsible for webcasts of the games. Although talented with computers and technology, he has little athletic ability-or interest in sports (including baseball). (seasons 1–2; recurring, seasons 3–4)
- J. K. Simmons as Matt "The Bat" Hardesty, a former baseball player turned sports announcer (season 3)
- Tawny Newsome as Gabby Taylor, a former NCAA Champion softball player and Brockmire's new broadcasting partner (season 3)
- Reina Hardesty as Beth Brockmire, Jim's Filipino-American daughter (season 4)

=== Recurring characters ===
==== Season 1 ====
- Paul Rae as Dale, a Morristown resident who acts in stereotypical redneck fashion, frequenting both Frackers home games and the local bar. In season 2, it is revealed that he died in a meth lab fire.
- Hemky Madera as Pedro Uribe, a baseball player for the Morristown Frackers, as well as a former Major League all-star.
- Molly Ephraim as Bartender
- Adan Rocha as Danny Cruz, a baseball player for the Morristown Frackers.
- Steve Coulter as Coach Pom Pom, coach for the Morristown Frackers.
- Ryan Lee as John Elton, a baseball player for the Morristown Frackers.
- Alex Phipps as Ryan Stanton, a baseball player for the Morristown Frackers.
- Daisuke Tsuji as Yoshi Takatsu, a baseball player for the Morristown Frackers, formerly a professional in Japan.
- Ethan Daniels as Bat Boy Calhoun
- Toby Huss as Johnny the Hat
- Katie Finneran as Lucy Brockmire, Brockmire's sexually adventurous ex-wife (recurring, seasons 1–2, 4).
- David Walton as Gary
- Brian F. Durkin as Robbie Butler
- Joe Buck as Himself

==== Season 2 ====
- Utkarsh Ambudkar as Raj, Brockmire's broadcasting partner for the Atlanta minor league affiliate New Orleans Crawdaddies, as well as his main competitor for a big-league broadcasting job with the Braves in Atlanta, Georgia.
- Becky Ann Baker as Jean Brockmire Glasscock, Brockmire's sister.
- Carrie Preston as Elle
- Dreama Walker as Whitney, a PR manager
- Joe Buck as Himself

==== Season 3 ====
- Richard Kind as Gus Barton, Brockmire's new producer
- Martha Plimpton as Shirley, Brockmire's Alcoholics Anonymous sponsor
- Tawny Newsome as Gabby Taylor, Brockmire's new co-announcer in the booth
- Christine Woods as Maggie, an oncology nurse
- J. K. Simmons as Matt "The Bat" Hardesty, a former baseball player on his deathbed who Jim talks to in his final days
- Linda Lavin as Lorraine, Brockmire's estranged criminal mother
- George Brett as Himself
- Bob Costas as Himself

==== Season 4 ====
- Joe Buck as Himself

== Episodes ==
Season	Episodes	Originally released	
Season	Episodes	First released	Last released
1	8	April 5, 2017	May 24, 2017
2	8	April 25, 2018	June 20, 2018
3	8	April 3, 2019	May 22, 2019
4	8	March 18, 2020	May 6, 2020

=== Season 1 (2017) ===
No. overall	No. in season	Title	Directed by	Written by	Original release date	Prod. code	U.S. viewers (millions)
1	1	"Rally Cap"	Tim Kirkby	Joel Church-Cooper	April 5, 2017	101	0.317
2	2	"Winning Streak"	Tim Kirkby	Joel Church-Cooper	April 12, 2017	102	0.303
3	3	"Kangaroo Court"	Tim Kirkby	Joel Church-Cooper	April 19, 2017	103	0.264
4	4	"Retaliation"	Tim Kirkby	Alex Reid	April 26, 2017	104	0.262
5	5	"Breakout Year"	Tim Kirkby	Jason Belleville	May 3, 2017	105	0.233
6	6	"Road Trip"	Tim Kirkby	Amanda Sitko	May 10, 2017	106	0.212
7	7	"Old Timers Day"	Tim Kirkby	Joel Church-Cooper	May 17, 2017	107	0.190
8	8	"It All Comes Down to This"	Tim Kirkby	Joel Church-Cooper	May 24, 2017	108	0.194

=== Season 2 (2018) ===
No. overall	No. in season	Title	Directed by	Written by	Original release date	Prod. code	U.S. viewers (millions)
9	1	"The Getaway Game"	Maurice Marable	Joel Church-Cooper	April 25, 2018	201	0.259
10	2	"Platoon Player"	Maurice Marable	Joel Church-Cooper & Carl Tart	May 2, 2018	202	0.216
11	3	"Knuckleball"	Maurice Marable	Amanda Sitko	May 9, 2018	203	0.233
12	4	"Retirement Ceremony"	Maurice Marable	Alex Reid	May 16, 2018	204	0.165
13	5	"Make-up Game"	Maurice Marable	Annie Mebane	May 23, 2018	205	0.179
14	6	"Broadcasters Jinx"	Maurice Marable	Rene Gube	May 30, 2018	206	0.339
15	7	"Caught in a Rundown"	Maurice Marable	Jason Belleville	June 13, 2018	207	0.167
16	8	"In the Cellar"	Maurice Marable	Joel Church-Cooper	June 20, 2018	208	0.181

=== Season 3 (2019) ===
No. overall	No. in season	Title	Directed by	Written by	Original release date	Prod. code	U.S. viewers (millions)
17	1	"Clubhouse Cancer"	Maurice Marable	Joel Church-Cooper	April 3, 2019	301	0.221
18	2	"Player to Be Named Later"	Maurice Marable	Amanda Sitko	April 10, 2019	302	0.176
19	3	"The Yips"	Maurice Marable	Jason Belleville	April 17, 2019	303	0.183
20	4	"Banned for Life"	Maurice Marable	Alex Reid	April 24, 2019	304	0.171
21	5	"Clubhouse Chemistry"	Maurice Marable	Mel Cowan	May 1, 2019	305	0.131
22	6	"Placed on Waivers"	Maurice Marable	Jenny Lee	May 8, 2019	306	0.145
23	7	"Disabled List"	Maurice Marable	Andrew Guest	May 15, 2019	307	0.185
24	8	"Opening Day"	Maurice Marable	Joel Church-Cooper and Amanda Sitko	May 22, 2019	308	0.173

=== Season 4 (2020) ===
No. overall	No. in season	Title	Directed by	Written by	Original release date	Prod. code	U.S. viewers (millions)
25	1	"Favorable Matchup"	Maurice Marable	Joel Church-Cooper	March 18, 2020	401	0.194
26	2	"Three Year Contract"	Maurice Marable	Jason Belleville	March 25, 2020	402	0.142
27	3	"Low and Away"	Maurice Marable	Alex Reid	April 1, 2020	403	0.164
28	4	"Comeback Player of the Year"	Maurice Marable	Amanda Sitko	April 8, 2020	404	0.178
29	5	"Double Header"	Maurice Marable	Arbel Kodesh and Sheena Datt	April 15, 2020	405	0.114
30	6	"The Hall"	Maurice Marable	Rene Gube	April 22, 2020	406	0.187
31	7	"Union Negotiations"	Maurice Marable	Mel Cowan	April 29, 2020	407	0.144
32	8	"The Long Offseason"	Maurice Marable	Joel Church-Cooper	May 6, 2020	408	0.153

== Production ==
=== Background ===
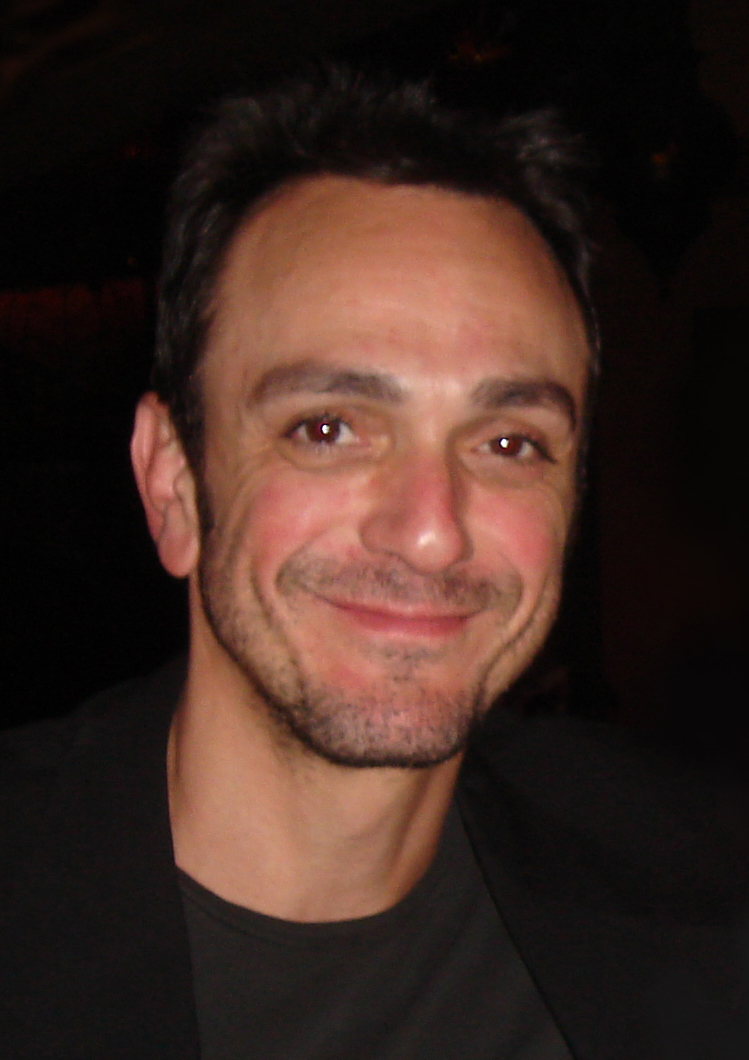
Hank Azaria

In 2010, Azaria debuted the character of Jim Brockmire in the third episode of the Funny or Die web-series Gamechangers, entitled "A Legend in the Booth". Brockmire is a baseball play-by-play announcer who is fired after a profanity-filled breakdown while live on air after discovering his wife was having an affair. Azaria based the character's voice and broadcasting style on Bob Murphy and Phil Rizzuto and his sport coats on that of Lindsey Nelson.

Azaria later appeared as Brockmire in 2012 on the NFL Network's The Rich Eisen Podcast to discuss the National Football League. In November 2012, with Azaria fielding offers for a movie based on the character, he sued actor Craig Bierko over the ownership of the Brockmire voice. Bierko claimed that he helped develop the character. Azaria won the case in 2014, as Gary Allen Feess, a United States district judge, ruled that, though both actors had been using a baseball announcer voice before and since meeting at a party in 1990, only Azaria's voice was, as Brockmire, a defined, "tangible" character and thus subject to copyright.

=== Development ===
On February 22, 2016, it was announced that IFC had given the production, a comedy series based on the Brockmire character, a series order for a first season consisting of eight episodes. The series was set to be written by Joel Church-Cooper and directed by Tim Kirkby. Executive producers were expected to include Azaria, Church-Cooper, Kirkby, Mike Farah, and Joe Farrell.

On April 5, 2017, right before the series premiere, it was announced that IFC had renewed the show for a second season consisting of eight episodes. On March 29, 2018, it was announced that IFC had renewed the series for a third and fourth season. On December 12, 2019, the fourth and final season was announced for a spring 2020 premiere.

=== Casting ===
Alongside the series order announcement, it was confirmed that Hank Azaria would star in the series as the titular Brockmire. On May 13, 2016, it was announced Amanda Peet had joined the main cast. On June 30, 2016, it was reported that Tyrel Jackson Williams had been cast in a series regular role.

In October 2018, it was announced that Tawny Newsome and Martha Plimpton had been cast in recurring roles for season three and that George Brett, Bob Costas, Richard Kind, Linda Lavin, J. K. Simmons, and Christine Woods would make guest appearances.

=== Filming ===
In season one, baseball scenes of the show were filmed at Luther Williams Field in Macon, Georgia. Parts of season one, and the majority of season two, were filmed at Coolray Field in Gwinnett County, Georgia. In season three, filming took place at Regions Field in Birmingham, Alabama.

== Reception ==
=== Critical response ===
The first season of Brockmire met a positive response from critics. On the review aggregator website Rotten Tomatoes, 94% of 18 critics' reviews are positive, with an average rating of 6.7/10. The website's consensus reads: "Brockmire insinuates itself as the series goes on, elevated by assured, compelling performances from Hank Azaria and Amanda Peet -- and a raw humor all its own." Metacritic, which uses a weighted average, assigned the show a score of 83 out of 100 based on 25 reviews, indicating "universal acclaim".

=== Ratings ===
In its first season, Brockmire was IFC's highest-rated new series and cable's most time-shifted new comedy, averaging over 500,000 live-plus-three-day viewers per episode.

=== Awards and nominations ===
Year	Ceremony	Category	Recipient(s)	Result	Ref.
2018	Critics' Choice Television Awards	Best Actor in a Comedy Series	Hank Azaria	Nominated	
2019	Critics' Choice Television Awards	Best Actor in a Comedy Series	Hank Azaria	Nominated	
2021	Critics' Choice Television Awards	Best Actor in a Comedy Series	Hank Azaria	Nominated	

== Podcast ==
Following the completion of the series, Brockmire was reintroduced as a celebrity interview podcast series produced by Meadowlark Media.
