= Tylen Jacob Williams =

American television actor (born 2001)

- Born: December 8, 2001 (age 24); Westchester County, New York, U.S.
- Occupation: Actor
- Years active: 2005–2017
- Relatives: Tyler James Williams (brother); Tyrel Jackson Williams (brother)

Tylen Jacob Williams (born December 8, 2001) is a former American actor. He is known for his role as James Phillips in the Nick at Nite television comedy series Instant Mom (2013–2015).

== Early and personal life ==
Williams was born in Westchester County, New York. His mother, Angela Williams, is a singer-songwriter and his father, Le'Roy Williams, is a retired police sergeant. Both have worked as musicians. Williams also has two older brothers, Tyler James Williams and Tyrel Jackson Williams, both of whom are also actors.

In 2023, he and Tyrel came out as part of the LGBTQ+ community.

== Career ==
Williams began acting at the age of four as a younger version of Drew from the TV series Everybody Hates Chris. Williams also appeared in TV shows such as Without a Trace and Parks and Recreation. In 2013, Williams was cast as James Phillips, the prankster of the family, in the Nick at Nite series Instant Mom. In 2017 he portrayed Jordan Cavanaugh, the son of Detective Tommy Cavanaugh in Wisdom of the Crowd (Season 1 episode 7).

== Filmography ==
Television and film roles
Year	Title	Role	Notes
2005	Everybody Hates Chris	Baby Drew	Episodes: "Everybody Hates Halloween", "Everybody Hates Greg"
2006	Without a Trace	Jadon Gibbs	Episode: "The Calm Before"
2012	Parks and Recreation	Charlie	Episode: "Campaign Ad"
2012	Disney XD's My Life	Himself	Episode: "Tyrel Jackson Williams"
2013	Teens Wanna Know	Himself	Episode: "Dream Halloween with Zendaya, Tori Kelly & Rachel Crow"
2013–2015	Instant Mom	James Phillips	Main role
2014	Webheads	Himself	Episode: "Boys of Nick Celebrity Edition"
2015	Minay TV	Himself	Episode: "One Child at a Time Celebrity Football Game"
2015	Jake and the Never Land Pirates	Finn the Mer-Boy (voice)	Episode: "Attack of the Pirate Piranhas"
2017	Wisdom of the Crowd	Jordan Cavanaugh	Episode: "Trade Secrets"
