= Entitled (TV series) =

British comedy drama TV series

- Genre: Comedy drama
- Created by: Matt Morgan
- Directed by: Tim Kirkby
- Country of origin: United Kingdom
- Original language: English
- No. of seasons: 1
- No. of episodes: 8

Production
- Executive producers: Brett Gelman; Matt Morgan; Harry Williams; Jack Williams; Sarah Hammond; Tim Kirkby
- Production company: Two Brothers Pictures

Original release
- Network: Channel 4; Showtime
- Release: 19 December 2023 (Australia)

Entitled is a British comedy drama television series created by Matt Morgan and starring Brett Gelman. It was produced by Two Brothers Pictures in co-production with Channel 4 and Showtime and consists of an eight-episode first season. The series premiered on Foxtel in Australia on 19 December 2023 and later became available internationally via streaming platforms including Netflix.

== Premise ==
Entitled follows Gabe, an American widower who, after the death of his British wife, must navigate life with her estranged and eccentric family at their crumbling gothic mansion in the English countryside. There, the relatives vie for his affections and his newly inherited fortune.

== Cast ==
- Brett Gelman as Gabe
- Donald Sumpter as Quincy
- Pippa Bennett-Warner as Xanthe
- Mark Quartley as Bart
- Charlotte Arrowsmith as Mrs. Whitby
- Kelly Wenham as Elizabeth

== Production ==
Channel 4 and Showtime officially ordered Entitled as an eight episode half hour comedy series in May 2022, with Brett Gelman attached to star and executive produce alongside creator Matt Morgan. Tim Kirkby was named director for the first season.

== Reception ==
Critical and audience reception has been mixed, with some reviewers praising performances and humor while others noted unconventional plot developments.
