= Night Teeth =

Night teeth
- Official release poster
- Directed by: Adam Randall
- Written by: Brent Dillon
- Produced by: Vincent Gatewood; Ben Pugh; Charles Morrison
- Starring: Jorge Lendeborg Jr.; Debby Ryan; Lucy Fry; Raul Castillo; Sydney Sweeney; Megan Fox; Alfie Allen
- Cinematography: Eben Bolter
- Edited by: Dominic Laperriere
- Music by: Drum & Lace; Ian Hultquist
- Production companies: 42; Unique Features
- Distributed by: Netflix
- Release date: October 20, 2021
- Running time: 108 minutes
- Country: United States
- Language: English
- Budget: $21.7 million

Night Teeth is a 2021 American vampire thriller film directed by Adam Randall and written by Brent Dillon. The film stars Jorge Lendeborg Jr., Debby Ryan, Lucy Fry, Raul Castillo, Sydney Sweeney, Megan Fox, and Alfie Allen.

Night Teeth was released on October 20, 2021, by Netflix. The film received mixed reviews from critics. Metacritic gave the film a weighted average score of 42 out of 100 based on 10 critics, indicating "mixed or average reviews".

== Plot ==
The movie reveals that vampires have co-existed peacefully with humans for centuries, feeding only by consent.

Benny, a freelance chauffeur driving in place of his brother Jay, is hired by friends Blaire and Zoe to drive them to several popular Los Angeles nightclubs. Unbeknownst to him, the girls are both vampires, and Jay is secretly part of the human council charged with maintaining the peace between vampires and humans.

Victor, a wealthy vampire lord who has grown bored and discontented with his life, is planning to subvert the system by kidnapping Jay's girlfriend, breaking the truce with Boyle Heights. As Jay and his allies begin hunting down all of the vampires in Greater Los Angeles, Victor executes a plan to wipe out his fellow lords and seize power for himself while tasking Blaire and Zoe with creating as much chaos in the city as they can to distract the vampire hunters and peacekeepers.

When Benny drops the girls off at a hotel, he discovers that the hotel is actually a feeding ground for vampires and realizes what Blaire and Zoe are using him for. The girls threaten his life, but spare him so they can get to Jay. During a visit to one of their targets, the girls are trapped by vampire hunters, but Benny decides to help them escape and lets them hide at his home. Benny then learns that Victor has his brother, who lost to the vampire in hand-to-hand combat while trying to slay him.

Benny drops the girls off at the last location on their list and discovers that the home belongs to Victor. Blaire urges him to leave, but Benny refuses to abandon his brother. Inside the house, Benny finds several human prisoners being kept by the lord as "blood bags" for him to feed on, including Jay, but is captured by Victor while trying to free him. Victor and Zoe then threaten to kill him, leading Blaire to turn against Victor and Zoe, after realizing that she has feelings for Benny. In the struggle that follows, Zoe stabs Blaire and in retaliation, Benny remotely activates his brother's car, smashing a window and exposing sunlight which kills Zoe. Victor then attacks Benny using Jay as bait, and manages to bite Benny before Jay tackles him into sunlight, killing him. Benny soon transforms into a vampire and the brothers go their separate ways after Jay decides to start training as a professional vampire hunter and tells Benny that he expects him to fight by his side when the city plunges into chaos. Later that night, Benny meets Blaire for an evening out.

== Cast ==
- Jorge Lendeborg Jr. as Benny
- Debby Ryan as Blaire
- Lucy Fry as Zoé Moreau
- Raul Castillo as Jay
- Alfie Allen as Victor
- Alexander Ludwig as Rocko
- Sydney Sweeney as Eva
- Megan Fox as Grace
- Marlene Forte as Abuela
- Ash Santos as Maria
- Bryan Batt as Gio

== Production ==
In August 2019, it was announced Adam Randall would direct the film from a screenplay by Brent Dillon, with Netflix distributing. In February 2020, Jorge Lendeborg Jr., Debby Ryan, Lucy Fry, Alfie Allen and Raúl Castillo joined the cast of the film. In July 2020, Alexander Ludwig, Bryan Batt and Marlene Forte joined the cast of the film.

=== Filming ===
Principal photography began in February 2020 in New Orleans and Los Angeles. Later that year, production was halted due to the COVID-19 pandemic.

== Reception ==
On the review aggregator website Rotten Tomatoes, the film holds an approval rating of 38% based on 50 reviews, with an average rating of 5.4/10. The website's critics consensus reads, "Night Teeth has a solid cast and some interesting ideas, but they're all lost in a listlessly told, generally predictable vampire story." Metacritic gave the film a weighted average score of 42 out of 100 based on 10 critics, indicating "mixed or average reviews".

Meagan Navarro, writing for horror magazine Bloody Disgusting, gave the film two out of five stars, and said of the opening sequence that it "never really amount[s] to anything and sets the precedence for the film's anemic world-building", added that "what Night Teeth lacks in substance it makes up for in style", and concluded writing that "despite a likable lead and a constantly moving narrative, Night Teeth lacks bite" and labeled it as "predictable."
