= List of Instant Mom episodes =

Episodes of American sitcom television series

Instant Mom is an American sitcom developed by Howard Michael Gould and starring Tia Mowry-Hardrict as a stepmother of three children alongside her husband. The series is produced for the NickMom block on the Nick Jr. Channel, but premieres on Nick at Nite and TV Land. It originally aired from September 29, 2013 to December 19, 2015. It produced the block's best debut ratings in the channel's history. On November 22, 2013, the series was renewed for a second season of 20 episodes. On September 10, 2014, Mowry-Hardrict announced that the series was renewed for a third season. On October 21, 2015, it has been announced that the series has not been renewed for a fourth season and is set to air the series finale in December after 65 episodes produced.

The show debuted on September 29, 2013, and it ran for three seasons, airing 65 episodes total. It ended on December 19, 2015.

== Series overview ==
| Season | Episodes | Originally released | | |
| Season | Episodes | First released | Last released | Network |
|---|---|---|---|---|
| 1 | 23 | September 29, 2013 | June 12, 2014 | Nick at Nite; NickMom |
| 2 | 16 | October 2, 2014 | June 3, 2015 | Nick at Nite; NickMom |
| 3 | 26 | September 19, 2015 | December 19, 2015 | TV Land |

== Episodes ==
=== Season 1 (2013–14) ===
- This season consists of 23 episodes.
- Sheryl Lee Ralph is absent for five episodes.

| No. overall | No. in season | Title | Directed by | Written by | Original release date | Prod. code | U.S. viewers (millions) |
|---|---|---|---|---|---|---|---|
| 1 | 1 | "Pilot" | John Fortenberry | Story by : Jessica Butler & Warren Bell; Teleplay by : Jessica Butler & Warren Bell and Howard Michael Gould | September 29, 2013 | 101 | 1.27 |
Stephanie Phillips, a newly-married stepmom, tries to be more strict when her oldest step daughter, Gabby, wants to go a house party on a school night. Guest stars: Chase Austin as Patrick, Arielle Kebbel as Stephanie's Friend
| 2 | 2 | "The Lying Game" | Victor Gonzalez | Lori Kirkland Baker | October 6, 2013 | 106 | 1.17 |
Stephanie tells James that lying is acceptable if it makes someone’s day better, which leads him to tell a huge lie. When everyone is called to the principal’s office, the family must find a balance between honesty and shading the truth. Guest stars: John Rubinstein as Principal Skinner, Sarah Domin as Mrs. Marchant
| 3 | 3 | "Harp & Soul" | John Fortenberry | Annie Levine & Jonathan Emerson | October 13, 2013 | 103 | 1.24 |
Stephanie forces the kids to play musical instruments. Gabby is later stuck playing the organ at the church, when she does not know how to play, fooling Stephanie the entire time.
| 4 | 4 | "Forty-Two Inches of Pure Evil" | Victor Gonzalez | Colin Garland | October 20, 2013 | 105 | 1.30 |
Stephanie tries to help Aaron when he is bullied by another student. Maggie goes overboard helping Gabby with her cheerleading. Guest stars: Haley Pullos as Molly, Mckenna Grace as Sam, Mary Pat Gleason as Mrs. Gosnold
| 5 | 5 | "Not a Date" | Jody Margolin Hahn | Matthew Claybrooks | October 27, 2013 | 108 | 1.20 |
Gabby seeks help from Stephanie to convince Charlie to let her date. James tricks Aaron to let go of a toy, so he can have it for himself. Guest star: Brandon Soo Hoo as Owen
| 6 | 6 | "Rock Mom" | Jonathan Judge | Larry Doyle | November 3, 2013 | 110 | 1.29 |
Stephanie starts to feel insecure about her age. James and Aaron try to bribe Maggie for money to buy a video game. Guest stars: Christine Corpuz as Diana, Dat Pham as Brody
| 7 | 7 | "Dances With She-Wolves" | John Fortenberry | Regina Y. Hicks | November 10, 2013 | 104 | N/A |
Stephanie tries to fit in with a group of moms planning the dance at James' school. James gets advice from Charlie on wanting to speak to a girl he likes. Gabby keeps in contact via FaceTime with one of her friends who now lives in an African safari. Guest stars: Haley Pullos as Molly, Keesha Sharp as Lynn Lawson, Laura Kai Chen as Veronica, Jean Villepique as Dee, Amanda Reed as Helen, Kortney Nash as Dana
| 8 | 8 | "In Blog We Trust" | John Fortenberry | Glenn Gers | November 24, 2013 | 102 | N/A |
Stephanie seeks parenting advice by starting an anonymous blog and receives helpful tips until she discovers that the “helpful” users are the kids living under her roof, who have an agenda of their own. Guest star: Arielle Kebbel as Stephanie's Friend
| 9 | 9 | "The Gift of the Maggies" | Steve Zuckerman | Glenn Gers | December 8, 2013 | 114 | N/A |
Stephanie surprises the family with a visit from her father, Franklin (Larry Wilmore), on Christmas. However, the visit upsets Maggie, who has not gotten along with Franklin for years, until she suddenly has a change of heart, which even surprises Stephanie. James schemes to get many Christmas gifts. Guest star: Larry Wilmore as Franklin Turner
| 10 | 10 | "Staycation" | Jody Margolin Hahn | Glenn Gers | January 5, 2014 | 109 | 1.07 |
Stephanie comes up with activities at home when the family gets snowed in on a planned vacation. Charlie injures his back after taking the luggage upstairs, ignoring Stephanie's advice to be careful. Guest star: Time Winters as Lovak
| 11 | 11 | "Babysit This" | Jonathan Judge | Russ Woody | January 12, 2014 | 111 | 1.14 |
Stephanie goes to a hospital-related event where Charlie is the speaker, leaving Gabby to babysit James and Aaron when the babysitter that Stephanie hired leaves. However, Stephanie's decision to leave Gabby in charge upsets Charlie, feeling that Stephanie should have consulted with him first, before making that decision. Guest stars: Rachel Leah Cohen as Ms. Jamison, Mary Jo Catlett as Mrs. Sharp, Charles C. Stevenson Jr. as Dr. Sharp Absent: Sheryl Lee Ralph as Maggie Turner
| 12 | 12 | "Dine Hard" | Victor Gonzalez | Sean Presant | January 19, 2014 | 113 | N/A |
Charlie invites his boss Beverly (Caroline Aaron), over for dinner, to get a promotion at the hospital, with Stephanie planning the dinner. However, James started a scheme from stealing and melting Gabby's childhood stuff and gives Aaron an energy drink and ruins the plans. Guest star: Caroline Aaron as Beverly Keogh
| 13 | 13 | "True Romance" | Shannon Flynn | Annie Levine & Jonathan Emerson | February 9, 2014 | 116 | N/A |
Stephanie is upset after finding out that Charlie used same the vows from his first wedding again in his wedding to her. Aaron gives away Stephanie's jewelry to his girlfriend Sam as a Valentine's Day gift. Sam then gives the jewelry to her grandmother Roberta (Annie Potts), who is reluctant to give them back to Stephanie. Gabby tricks James into thinking that his Valentine is stalking him. Guest stars: Mckenna Grace as Sam, Kortney Nash as Dana, Annie Potts as Roberta Montgomery
| 14 | 14 | "A Kids' Choice" | Howard Michael Gould | Story by : Howard Michael Gould; Teleplay by : Regina Y. Hicks & Lori Kirkland Baker | March 29, 2014 | 126 | 3.44 |
The kids compete making a music video covering Cody Simpson's song "La Da Dee", with the winner of the best video then meeting Cody Simpson and attending his concert. Special guest star: Cody Simpson as himself
| 15 | 15 | "Chore Money, Chore Problems" | Bryan Barber | Yamara Taylor | April 3, 2014 | 119 | 1.67 |
Stephanie cancels the weekly cleaning service, seeing that the kids have been lazy, so she makes them do the chores, but her plan backfires after the kids go on strike. Guest stars: Tyler Michael Brown as Buddy, Virginia Louise Smith as Mrs. Mahary, Gary Morgan as Clown Absent: Sheryl Lee Ralph as Maggie Turner
| 16 | 16 | "Requiem for Mr. Floppity" | Roger Christiansen | Russ Woody | April 10, 2014 | 112 | 1.35 |
Aaron brings his class rabbit home to take care of it for the weekend but after it dies, Stephanie steps in and is determined to explain the nature of loss to Aaron, despite his teacher's Mrs. Gosnald (Mary Pat Gleason) objections. Gabby gets a pet mouse and James gets a pet snake hiding it from the rest of the family. Guest stars: Tyler Corbet as Eric, Carsen Warner as Ryan, Mary Pat Gleason as Mrs. Gosnold Absent: Sheryl Lee Ralph as Maggie Turner
| 17 | 17 | "Buy Any Jeans Necessary" | John Fortenberry | Sean Presant | April 17, 2014 | 115 | N/A |
Stephanie and Charlie take sides when Gabby is held for shoplifting after returning a pair of jeans with the sensor still on it. James sells unopened wedding presents to make extra money. Guest stars: Haley Pullos as Molly; Matthew J. Evans as Ronny Sluff; Marianne Muellerleile as Pat Absent: Sheryl Lee Ralph as Maggie Turner
| 18 | 18 | "Distant Mom" | Shannon Flynn | Colin Garland | April 24, 2014 | 120 | 1.61 |
After returning from spending a week with their mom, Stephanie and Charles are in for surprises as they learn that his ex wife, Kim got a job offer and is planning on keeping the kids for a year in Mozambique Guest stars: Holly Robinson Peete as Kimberly Phillips, Amy Holland as Trish, Gary Morgan as Clown
| 19 | 19 | "Camp Fear" | Jonathan Judge | Lori Kirkland Baker | May 1, 2014 | 117 | 1.61 |
Stephanie goes on the family camping trip to help Aaron earn scout badges, but when Maggie shows up in the camping trailer, the family has no interest in being out in the woods, so Stephanie is determined to keep them out of there so Aaron can earn his scout badges the right way. Guest stars: Eric Corbet as Eric, Dat Pham as Brody
| 20 | 20 | "Not Your Mother's Day" | Shannon Flynn | Annie Levine & Jonathan Emerson | May 8, 2014 | 125 | 1.38 |
Stephanie is excited about celebrating her first Mother's Day until she learns that the family plans to celebrate her on Stepmother's Day, the week after. Stephanie takes Maggie to a day spa and gets some unexpected "mom" advice from a few experts (Meredith Baxter, Tempestt Bledsoe, Jackée Harry (Tia Mowry-Hardrict's former Sister, Sister co-star), Florence Henderson and Marion Ross) who attempt to cheer her up. Guest stars: Haley Pullos as Molly, Meredith Baxter, Florence Henderson, Jackee Harry, Marion Ross as Marion Cunningham, Tempestt Bledsoe, Samantha Roy as Leslie
| 21 | 21 | "The Last Auction Hero" | Jonathan Judge | Sean Presant | May 29, 2014 | 122 | N/A |
Stephanie organizes a charity auction to inspire the children to give back, Stephanie goes to extreme measures to beat the previous fundraising record especially now that Charlie's boss, Beverly returns and helps with the charity. Guest stars: Caroline Aaron as Beverly Keogh, Bruce Beatty as Elliot, Alexander Arzu as Rodney Dugan, Isiah Adams as Miles Wright, Flip Schultz as Mr. Langworthy
| 22 | 22 | "48 Hours" | Victor Gonzalez | Yamara Taylor | June 5, 2014 | 107 | 1.27 |
Stephanie has her friend Jenny stay with her while Charlie's away on a business trip. James must complete a school project in time. Aaron has a play date with his friend Brody, and Gabby is grounded. Guest stars: Dat Pham as Brody, Stephanie Charles as Jenny, Jessalyn Wanlim as Nikki, Britt Rentschler as Holly, Jo Newman as Jules, Angela Oh as Brody's Mom Absent: Sheryl Lee Ralph as Maggie Turner
| 23 | 23 | "Should Old Acquaintance Be for Hire" | Jonathan Judge | Glenn Gers | June 12, 2014 | 123 | 0.98 |
Stephanie bribes Gabby and James when she hires an old boyfriend to install a new sound system for Charlie. Stephanie doesn't want Maggie to be negative about the whole situation so Maggie volunteers to say nothing and Aaron has trouble trying to keep a secret. Stephanie and Charlie then have their anniversary dinner out at a restaurant. Guest star: Christian Keyes as Vince

=== Season 2 (2014–15) ===
- This season consists of 16 episodes.
- Sheryl Lee Ralph is absent for two episodes.

| No. overall | No. in season | Title | Directed by | Written by | Original release date | Prod. code | U.S. viewers (millions) |
|---|---|---|---|---|---|---|---|
| 24 | 1 | "Sanders Again" | Victor Gonzalez | Russ Woody | October 2, 2014 | 203 | 1.12 |
Stephanie worries that she is working too much when Aaron's imaginary friend, Sanders, returns. After researching the issue, Stephanie does her best to make the invisible pal feel comfortable. Guest star: Mary Pat Gleason as Mrs. Gosnold
| 25 | 2 | "An Egg by Any Other Name" | Steve Zuckerman | Russ Woody | October 9, 2014 | 118 | 1.08 |
The kids' garden is destroyed by the neighbors, so Stephanie and Charlie seek revenge, and soon the kids follow their bad example. Guest stars: Evan Crooks as Kyle Ebnetter, Molly Hagan as Unis Ebnetter, John Michael Higgins as Hoyt Ebnetter
| 26 | 3 | "Gabby's Game Boy" | Shannon Flynn | Story by : Howard Michael Gould; Teleplay by : Annie Levine & Jonathan Emerson | October 16, 2014 | 201 | 1.19 |
When Stephanie and Charlie learn that Gabby has had a secret boyfriend, they meet him, finding him to be a bad influence. Guest star: BJ Mitchell as Noah
| 27 | 4 | "Children of the Candy Corn" | Bryan Barber | Yamara Taylor | October 23, 2014 | 207 | 1.06 |
Stephanie feels expendable on Halloween when the kids make their own plans. Meanwhile, Charlie tries to maintain his record for having the best decorated house in the neighborhood. Guest stars: Haley Pullos as Molly, BJ Mitchell as Noah, Carsen Warner as Ryan
| 28 | 5 | "Teacher's Pest" | Victor Gonzalez | Sean Presant | November 6, 2014 | 204 | 1.07 |
Aaron lands in hot water with his teacher, whom he calls a doofus—a word he heard Stephanie utter. Meanwhile, James uses Charlie in his plan to get out of doing his history homework. Guest stars: Haley Pullos as Molly, Tyler Corbet as Eric, Allison Munn as Donna Dreyfus, Mary Pat Gleason as Mrs. Gosnold, Laura Krystine as Olivia, Alan Ruck as Mr. Shank Absent: Sheryl Lee Ralph as Maggie Turner
| 29 | 6 | "James Goes Pro" | Shannon Flynn | Glenn Gers | November 13, 2014 | 202 | 0.999 |
James' video-game skills get him on a professional team, but then he regrets going pro, so Stephanie and Charlie try to get him out of his contract. Guest stars: BJ Mitchell as Noah, John DeLuca as Zack, Ceyair Wright as Darren Mockler
| 30 | 7 | "Drill Team" | Victor Gonzalez | Mike Langworthy | November 20, 2014 | 205 | 1.22 |
Stephanie agrees to see a dentist to help Aaron get over his fears, but is nervous to discover the dentist is a face from her past. Guest star: Matt Besser as Dr. Porter
| 31 | 8 | "Popular Mechanics" | John Fortenberry | Glenn Gers | December 4, 2014 | 209 | 0.861 |
James becomes popular at school after others incorrectly believe he's a bad boy, and when one of his new pals does something wrong, he's reluctant to tattle; Stephanie lectures James about doing the right thing. Guest stars: BJ Mitchell as Noah, Trevor Gore as Sam, Isaak Presley as Peety, Kyle Red Silverstein, Amarr M. Wooten as Dean, Sydney Mikayla Absent: Sheryl Lee Ralph as Maggie Turner
| 32 | 9 | "Not Full House" | John Fortenberry | Regina Y. Hicks | April 15, 2015 | 208 | N/A |
Stephanie and Charlie plan a child-free weekend in New York, only to find that Aaron has stowed away in their car; James and Gabby make plans while their parents are away. Guest stars: Haley Pullos as Molly, BJ Mitchell as Noah, Carsen Warner as Ryan, Reno Selmser as Bryan, Shawn McGill as Wyatt
| 33 | 10 | "How You Bike Me Now" | Shannon Flynn | Regina Y. Hicks | April 22, 2015 | 124 | 0.94 |
When both Stephanie and James face rejection, she signs them up for a bike race to prove that hard work pays off. Guest stars: Amy Holland as Trish, Reagan Gomez-Preston as Rhonda Butler
| 34 | 11 | "My Stupid Sweet Sixteen" | Jonathan Judge | Sean Presant | April 29, 2015 | 213 | N/A |
Stephanie plans a surprise party for Gabby's 16th birthday, but things don't go as she intended because of Maggie's mistake with the invitations. Guest stars: Haley Pullos as Molly, BJ Mitchell as Noah
| 35 | 12 | "Yelly Monster" | John Fortenberry | Yamara Taylor | May 6, 2015 | 121 | N/A |
After Aaron describes Stephanie as a 'yelly monster' when she tries to get the family ready in the morning, Stephanie realizes that she must do better.
| 36 | 13 | "Ain't Misbehavin' or Else" | Shannon Flynn | Larry Doyle | May 13, 2015 | 210 | N/A |
When Stephanie's neighbor has better success getting the children to do things, Stephanie worries about what it is doing to them. Guest stars: Megan Hagan as Eunice Ebnetter, John Michael Higgins as Hoyt Ebnetter
| 37 | 14 | "Instant Prom" | Jonathan Judge | Annie Levine & Jonathan Emerson | May 20, 2015 | 212 | N/A |
Noah asks Gabby to the prom, but she worries about fitting in at the after party; Stephanie and Charlie get overprotective. Guest stars: BJ Mitchell as Noah, Haley Pullos as Molly, Cooper Peltz as Thad, Taylor Bright as Megan, Anna Margaret as Emily
| 38 | 15 | "Don't Worry, Be Maggie" | Ken Levine | Annie Levine & Jonathan Emerson | May 27, 2015 | 211 | N/A |
After reacting to Gabby's desire to get a tattoo, Stephanie worries that she is becoming like Maggie, and makes efforts to prove otherwise. Guest stars: Haley Pullos as Molly, Notlim Taylor as Erin, Mark Curry as Reverend
| 39 | 16 | "Ghost Busted" | Bryan Barber | Jeny Batten & M. Dickson | June 3, 2015 | 206 | N/A |
Stephanie sees a horror movie with Gabby, despite Charlie's objections, and Stephanie winds up being frightened. Her fears then escalate when James tries to persuade her their house is haunted. Guest star: Jim Piddock as Professor Ian Houser

=== Season 3 (2015) ===
| No. overall | No. in season | Title | Directed by | Written by | Original release date | Prod. code | U.S. viewers (millions) |
|---|---|---|---|---|---|---|---|
| 40 | 1 | "Fear Factor" | Victor Gonzalez | Regina Y. Hicks | September 19, 2015 | 303 | 0.314 |
After facing her fear of swimming, Stephanie forces the rest of the family to face their fears as well. Guest star: Sawyer Valin as Kid
| 41 | 2 | "Mysteries of Maggie" | Sheldon Epps | Glenn Gers | September 19, 2015 | 306 | 0.362 |
Aaron learns that Maggie has a secret career as a romance novelist, but when she denies it, the family tries to get her to reveal her secret identity.
| 42 | 3 | "Ship of Fool" | John Fortenberry | Russ Woody | September 26, 2015 | 312 | N/A |
When Stephanie tries to teach James and Aaron about selfless generosity, the whole family starts helping Mr. Ebnetter for the wrong reasons. Guest stars: Megan Hagan as Eunice Ebnetter, John Michael Higgins as Hoyt Ebnetter
| 43 | 4 | "No Retreat, No Surrender" | Neel Keller | Glenn Gers | September 26, 2015 | 216 | N/A |
Stephanie and Charlie stop punishing Gabby and James for fighting, in hopes that they will work things out by themselves.
| 44 | 5 | "Bawamo Shazam" | Shannon Flynn | Sean Presant | October 3, 2015 | 304 | N/A |
With Gabby and the parents arguing, a smug Maggie takes Gabby for the weekend to straighten her out. When Gabby and Maggie get along surprisingly well, Stephanie must show Gabby the “real” Maggie she grew up with.
| 45 | 6 | "Driving Ms. Crazy" | Sheldon Epps | Yamara Taylor | October 3, 2015 | 219 | N/A |
When a ticket means that Stephanie must ride with Gabby for her to drive, Stephanie begins to get too comfortable with Gabby's friends. Guest star: Haley Pullos as Molly Absent: Sheryl Lee Ralph as Maggie Turner
| 46 | 7 | "Basket Case" | Neel Keller | Story by : Jeny Batten & M. Dickson; Teleplay by : Regina Y. Hicks and Howard Michael Gould | October 10, 2015 | 302 | N/A |
After Stephanie helps Aaron beat James at a game, Charlie worries that she has upset the balance of power in the family. Gabby gets caught in the middle of a fight between Stephanie and Maggie.
| 47 | 8 | "Turning a Blind Eye" | Shannon Flynn | Annie Levine & Jonathan Emerson | October 10, 2015 | 218 | N/A |
Maggie bribes James and Aaron to pretend to be her younger brothers; Gabby is punished for having Noah over. Guest stars: Carlos PenaVega as Roger, BJ Mitchell as Noah
| 48 | 9 | "Thumper for President" | Howard Michael Gould | Jeny Batten & M. Dickson | October 17, 2015 | 217 | N/A |
After being humiliated by a girl at school, James runs against her in an election; Charlie asks Gabby to help him replace a lost wedding wing. Guest star: Breanna Yde as Grace
| 49 | 10 | "Bag Lady" | Jonathan Judge | Yamara Taylor | October 17, 2015 | 215 | N/A |
Gabby loans Stephanie's purse to a popular girl, but when it gets ruined, Gabby must scramble to replace it. Guest stars: Haley Pullos as Molly, Taylor Bright as Megan, Anna Margaret as Emily, Vianessa Castanos as Trudi Waynette, Gabrielle Christian as Lynda Momsley, Lila Lucchetti as Ginger Skipertoo, Jacqueline Georgiou as Boutique Employee, Lexie Contursi as Hostess Absent: Sheryl Lee Ralph as Maggie Turner
| 50 | 11 | "Off the Hook" | Howard Michael Gould | Yamara Taylor | October 24, 2015 | 301 | N/A |
James gets a "get out of jail free" card from Stephanie and Charlie and the kids exchange the card among themselves.
| 51 | 12 | "Jamal in the Family" | John Fortenberry | Sean Presant | October 24, 2015 | 311 | N/A |
The Phillips get a visit from their cousin, but Charlie worries he'll be a bad influence on James. Also: Aaron and Maggie help Gabby prepare for a date. Guest stars: Tyler James Williams as Jamal, Miles Wood as Flip McAlister lll
| 52 | 13 | "Friendly Fire" | Shannon Flynn | Magda Liolis | October 31, 2015 | 214 | N/A |
Stephanie asks Aaron to befriend a client's son, not realizing Aaron is terrified of him; Gabby saves Maggie's life. Guest stars: Kristina Hayes as Claire Adams; Carter Hastings as Justin
| 53 | 14 | "Two Guys and a Gabby" | Sheldon Epps | Sean Presant | October 31, 2015 | 220 | N/A |
Gabby uses a childhood friend to make Noah jealous; Stephanie tries to correct Aaron when he accidentally calls her "Mom." Guest stars: BJ Mitchell as Noah, Uriah Shelton as Emmery
| 54 | 15 | "Crimes of Fashion" | John Fortenberry | Sean Presant | November 7, 2015 | 309 | N/A |
Stephanie helps James lead a student rebellion when the principal cracks down on the dress code; Gabby teaches Charlie how to use social media. Guest stars: Nelson Franklin as Principal Strick, Taylor Locascio as Katie, Dominic Kline as Student #1, Jayla Calhoun as Student #2
| 55 | 16 | "Smarty Bowl" | John Fortenberry | Yamara Taylor | November 7, 2015 | 308 | N/A |
Stephanie needs to get Gabby's help to stay on top of Aaron's homework so that she will not disappoint him. Guest star: Olga Aguilar as Mrs. Hill
| 56 | 17 | "S-A-Tease" | Howard Michael Gould | Annie Levine & Jonathan Emerson | November 14, 2015 | 313 | N/A |
The night before Gabby takes the SATs, a secret about Stephanie is exposed; James and Aaron have a hard time sharing a room.
| 57 | 18 | "International Incident" | Neel Keller | Glenn Gers | November 14, 2015 | 310 | N/A |
James tries to trick Stephanie and Charlie into thinking one of his friends is actually a foreign exchange student. Guest stars: Guilford Adams as Mr. Butler, Raymond Ochoa as Blix/Rudy, Harry Van Gorkum as Stanley
| 58 | 19 | "Yoot There It Is" | Neel Keller | Glenn Gers | November 21, 2015 | 316 | N/A |
James and Gabby try to make a business out of selling Grandma Maggie's fruit snacks, but when she finds out, she wants a piece of the action. Guest stars: Sonari Jo as Kid #1, Alexis Wilkins as Lola
| 59 | 20 | "Walk Like a Boy" | Jonathan Judge | Larry Doyle | November 21, 2015 | 314 | N/A |
After Aaron is brought home by the police, family services must determine whether Stephanie and Charlie are doing a good enough job as parents. Guest stars: Haley Pullos as Molly, Breanna Yde as Grace, Julia Cho as Mrs. Marsh, John Colella as Officer Smith, Kareem Grimes as Officer
| 60 | 21 | "Dollar Sign" | Ken Levine | Annie Levine & Jonathan Emerson | December 5, 2015 | 315 | N/A |
Stephanie decides that Gabby needs to get a job and earn money for her car; Maggie and James try to teach the older generations how to speak like teenagers. Guest stars: Joey Luthman as Stuart, Bee-Be Smith as Ida, Patti Tippo as Barbara, Harvey J. Alpern as Lucius
| 61 | 22 | "Bug Out" | Sheldon Epps | Annie Levine & Jonathan Emerson | December 5, 2015 | 307 | N/A |
Stephanie blames the family for Aaron's alleged funk; they try to change their habits for a week but this only results in more trouble. Guest stars: Haley Pullos as Molly, Joshua Bray as Kid, Kareem Grimes as Officer
| 62 | 23 | "Playa Hata" | Neel Keller | Yamara Taylor | December 12, 2015 | 318 | N/A |
Charlie approves of a boy that Gabby's interested in, which makes her doubt her decision; James finds himself with two girlfriends at the same time. Guest stars: Matthew Josten as Brett Myers, Makayla Lysiak as Carrie Everest, Brooke D. Singleton as Raegan
| 63 | 24 | "Hourly Rage" | Shannon Flynn | Jeny Batten & M. Dickson | December 12, 2015 | 305 | N/A |
Gabby is the group leader for her school project but when Stephanie discovers that she's acting like a tyrant, she gets involved; Stephanie somehow ends up doing all the work. Guest stars: Joey Luthman as Stuart, Brandon Tyler Russell as Vinnie, Carrie Wampler as Tess
| 64 | 25 | "Gone Batty" | Victor Gonzalez | Jeny Batten & M. Dickson | December 19, 2015 | 317 | 0.201 |
Gabby finds out that her ex's new girlfriend is using him and tries to expose the truth but everyone thinks she's jealous; Charlie, Aaron and Maggie search for a bat. Guest stars: BJ Mitchell as Noah, Lexi DiBenedetto as Bianca, Lisa Arturo as Mrs. Vonwright, Jack Armstrong as Mr. Vonwright
| 65 | 26 | "Ain't Over Till It's Over" | Howard Michael Gould | Howard Michael Gould | December 19, 2015 | 319 | 0.201 |
Gabby is leaving for college a year early and Stephanie and Charlie consider having a baby; Aaron and James want to live with their mother in Orlando. Guest stars: Haley Pullos as Molly Series Finale
