= The Six Wives of Henry Lefay =

2009 film

The Six Wives of Henry LeFay
- DVD cover
- Directed by: Howard Michael Gould
- Written by: Howard Michael Gould
- Produced by: David Mcllvain; Holly Wiersma
- Starring: Tim Allen; Elisha Cuthbert; S. Epatha Merkerson; Andie MacDowell; Jenna Elfman; Paz Vega; Lindsay Sloane; Jenna Dewan; Eric Christian Olsen
- Cinematography: Nancy Schreiber
- Edited by: Michael R. Miller
- Music by: Stephen Barton
- Distributed by: DFW; Eagle Films; Ledafilms; Nem
- Release date: June 18, 2009
- Running time: 95 minutes
- Country: United States
- Language: English

The Six Wives of Henry Lefay, also known as My Dad's Six Wives, is a 2009 American comedy film starring Elisha Cuthbert and Tim Allen. A grieving daughter tries to arrange her father's funeral, while putting up with all of his ex-wives. Its only theatrical release was in Israel, and it was launched straight to DVD elsewhere, including the United States and the United Kingdom.

== Plot ==
Henry, an American audio and video equipment store owner (similar to Crazy Eddie), is apparently killed in a parasailing accident in Mexico. His family cannot decide on whether Henry wanted to be cremated or buried. Henry's present wife Autumn claims all the inheritance for herself, and wants to make all the decisions regarding the funeral.

They have a closed casket funeral for Henry. Suddenly, Effa appears and introduces herself as Henry's first wife, who married him just after he dropped out of college, with the marriage lasting only three months. Henry got in touch with her again recently, and has been emailing her every day since.

Upon learning that the corpse has been cremated by Ophelia's orders by forging a signature to facilitate the cremation, Autumn is furious tries to run Ophelia down with a car. Autumn is further dismayed when Sarah reveals that Henry proposed to her. Barbie convinces Autumn to divide and scatter Henry's ashes in all the places he was happy. However, Ophelia steals the ashes for herself, and a fight ensues, and the cremation urn falls to the ground and breaks, scattering the ashes all over the sidewalk.

While the funeral for Henry is ongoing, they hear someone playing the harmonica in the background. They turn around to see Henry, alive and well. Another man who went parasailing along with Henry fell into the water and died. Henry left his ID there and went drinking. He gets home and learns that there's a funeral planned for him and comes over to see it.

Barbie's boyfriend Lloyd proposes to her, but she turns him down. She has lunch with her father, and says goodbye to him, as she's moving to California. Her grandmother, Mae, tells Barbie that her mom Kate is in the hospital. Barbie gets together with her earlier boyfriend Stevie, but realizing that to be a mistake, calls Lloyd. She finds Henry drinking and talking about his life and death, and they reconcile.

Barbie marries Lloyd and Henry dances with all his wives. Ophelia reveals that she's getting married for a third time to Henry.

== Cast ==
- Tim Allen as Henry Lefay, a flashy salesman who is presumed dead after he goes missing during a parasailing expedition
- Elisha Cuthbert as Barbara "Barbie" Lefay (Henry's daughter)
- S. Epatha Merkerson as Effa Devereaux (Henry's secret first wife)
- Andie MacDowell as Kate (Henry's second wife and Barbie's mother)
- Jenna Elfman as Ophelia (Henry's third and fifth wife and current occasional lover)
- Paz Vega as Veronica (Henry's fourth wife)
- Lindsay Sloane as Autumn (Henry's sixth wife)
- Jenna Dewan as Sarah Jane (Henry's fiancée and nemesis of Barbie)
- Barbara Barrie as Mae (Henry's mother)
- Eric Christian Olsen as Lloyd Wiggins (Barbie's boyfriend who wants to marry her)
- Chris Klein as Stevie
- Larry Miller as Lipschutz
- Edward Herrmann as Goodenough, the funeral director

== Release history ==
Country	Date	Format
Israel	June 18, 2009	Movie theaters
Netherlands	January 12, 2010	DVD premiere
Germany	October 8, 2010	DVD premiere
United States	October 19, 2010	DVD premiere
United Kingdom	February 7, 2011	DVD premiere
World	February 8, 2011	DVD premiere
