= The Pentaverate =

2022 comedy miniseries by Mike Myers

- Genre: Comedy; Conspiracy
- Created by: Mike Myers
- Written by: Mike Myers; Roger Drew; Ed Dyson
- Directed by: Tim Kirkby
- Starring: Mike Myers; Ken Jeong; Keegan-Michael Key; Debi Mazar; Richard McCabe; Jennifer Saunders; Lydia West
- Narrated by: Jeremy Irons
- Music by: Orbital
- Opening theme: "The Box"
- Original language: English
- No. of episodes: 6

Production
- Executive producers: Mike Myers; Ed Dyson; Roger Drew; Tim Kirkby; John Lyons; Jason Weinberg; Tony Hernandez; Lilly Burns
- Production companies: Nomoneyfun Films; Untitled Entertainment; Jax Media

Original release
- Network: Netflix
- Release: May 5, 2022

The Pentaverate is a 2022 comedy television miniseries created by Mike Myers for Netflix, inspired by conspiracy theories from his 1993 film So I Married an Axe Murderer. The series premiered on May 5, 2022, and consists of six episodes.

== Premise ==
Since the 1347 outbreak of the Black Death, five men realized that the black plague was caused by fleas on rats; however, the Church believed it to be a punishment from God and labelled them as heretics. Realizing this, they worked together to form a secret society that influences world events for the greater good. Centuries later, an unlikely Canadian journalist finds himself involved in a hidden conspiracy in the middle of a mission to expose the truth behind the secret society and, in the process, saves the world.

== Cast ==
- Mike Myers in several roles as:
  - Ken Scarborough: a Canadian TV journalist attempting to expose the Pentaverate and win back his news network job
  - Anthony Lansdowne: a New England conspiracy theorist determined to expose the Pentaverate
  - Rex Smith: a popular far-right radio host and prominent conspiracy theorist
  - Lord Lordington: the oldest and highest-ranking member of the Pentaverate, seated at the dais as "Centralis"
  - Bruce Baldwin: a Pentaverate member and former Australian media mogul
  - Mishu Ivanov: a Pentaverate member and former Russian oligarch
  - Shep Gordon: a Pentaverate member and rock music mogul (subject of the documentary Supermensch: The Legend of Shep Gordon, directed by Myers)
  - Jason Eccleston: a tech genius who invented the Pentaverate supercomputer AI, MENTOR
- Ken Jeong as Skip Cho: an eccentric billionaire and casino mogul with extensive knowledge in the chaos theory of weather patterns
- Keegan-Michael Key as Dr. Hobart Clark: a Pentaverate initiate and nuclear physicist hoping to resolve climate change
- Debi Mazar as Patty Davis: the trusted Executive Assistant to the Pentaverate
- Richard McCabe as Exalted Pikeman Higgins: the head of the Pentaverate security force, the Liechtenstein Guard
- Jennifer Saunders as:
  - The Maester of Dubrovnik: the Pentaverate's head investigator, summoned from his ancestral home in Dubrovnik to investigate a suspicious death
  - The Saester of Dubrovnik: the Maester's sister and protector of the parce clavem, the spare key for the Pentaverate voting apparatus
- Lydia West as Reilly Clayton: Ken Scarborough's young associate
- Neil Mullarkey as the mysterious mustached man

Rob Lowe and Maria Menounos appear as fictionalized versions of themselves. Tanya Moodie plays Mrs. Snee, Ken's boss on his TV network. Myers briefly reprised his voice role as Shrek from the film series of the same name, who appears as a walk-around character that saves Ken. Jeremy Irons narrates the opening titles.

== Episodes ==
No.	Title	Directed by	Written by	Original release date
1	"Episode 1"	Tim Kirkby	Mike Myers	May 5, 2022
Dr. Hobart Clark, a nuclear physicist, is kidnapped and presented membership within the Pentaverate, an exclusive secret society dedicated to the betterment of mankind. The members – Lord Lordington, Mishu Ivanov, Bruce Baldwin, and Shep Gordon, need his help to combat the effects of climate change in advance of the Meadows, a gathering of the world's most powerful elite. Learning that his predecessor, computer engineer Jason Eccleston died before he could complete the work, Clark reluctantly accepts. Meanwhile, Ken Scarborough, a Canadian newscaster, is forced into retirement but pleads to keep his job if he can report on a groundbreaking story. He is joined by colleague Reilly Clayton. They attend a conspiracy theory convention and meet Anthony Lansdowne, who agrees to help them expose the Pentaverate.
2	"Episode 2"	Tim Kirkby	Story by : Mike Myers; Teleplay by : Mike Myers & Roger Drew & Ed Dyson	May 5, 2022
Clark, with the help of Eccleston's supercomputer AI MENTOR, successfully creates a space sunshade to keep the Earth from global warming; he and Bruce Baldwin celebrate before executive assistant Patty Davis seduces him. The following morning, Patty finds that Clark is dead. Ken, Reilly, and Anthony arrive in the United States and meet with a bar owner who agrees to give them a Pentaverate access key if Ken defeats him in pool. To get the key, Ken must infiltrate by joining the Liechtenstein Guard, the Pentaverate's security force. The Maester of Dubrovnik arrives to investigate the mysterious deaths.
3	"Episode 3"	Tim Kirkby	Story by : Mike Myers; Teleplay by : Mike Myers & Roger Drew & Ed Dyson	May 5, 2022
Skip Cho, an eccentric billionaire, is recruited into the Pentaverate as Clark's replacement. The Maester of Dubrovnik suspects poison to have killed Eccleston and Clark. Ken begins his training with the Liechtenstein Guard, soon discovering the Maester of Dubrovnik and his aides have been murdered. Another security force, the Red Robes, is brought in. Suspecting a coup, the leader of the Liechtenstein Guard, Exalted Pikeman Higgins, sends Ken on a mission to Dubrovnik in order to retrieve the parce clavem, the spare voting apparatus they can use to save the Pentaverate from falling into evil hands.
4	"Episode 4"	Tim Kirkby	Story by : Mike Myers; Teleplay by : Mike Myers & Roger Drew & Ed Dyson	May 5, 2022
In Dubrovnik, Ken is saved from the Pentaverate's Sasquatch by Shrek and retrieves the parce clavem from the Saester of Dubrovnik. Despite Anthony's warnings, he touches it and it fuses with his DNA. Ken returns to the Pentaverate Headquarters with the key, but they take it and accuse him of theft and the murder of Clark and Eccleston. They reveal Higgins has been executed for treason. When Ken wakes up, a mysterious mustached man leads him out of his cell and onto a helicopter. Thinking they have escaped, they attempt to fly to Toronto only to be forced by remote control to an airport where Bruce and Skip await them in a jet.
5	"Episode 5"	Tim Kirkby	Story by : Mike Myers; Teleplay by : Mike Myers & Roger Drew & Ed Dyson	May 5, 2022
Bruce and Skip reveal they orchestrated the murders and intend to sell MENTOR at the Meadows for trillions of dollars despite the danger it poses in the wrong hands. They need Ken to enact the third vote. The Pentaverate prepared to vote on the self-sacrificing "Demetrious Protocol" to prevent any further votes but were unable to because the "Da Vinci Lock" had previously been sent to the Meadows. They are prevented from traveling to the Meadows in time because Bruce locked the hyperloop, but Patty manages to manually override it. Reilly reveals to Ken that she is a member of another secret society and has been tasked with helping him save the world.
6	"Episode 6"	Tim Kirkby	Story by : Mike Myers; Teleplay by : Mike Myers & Roger Drew & Ed Dyson	May 5, 2022
At the Meadows, Bruce and Skip auction MENTOR. Ken rallies the Liechtenstein Guard and they defeat the Red Robes. Bruce holds Reilly hostage, commanding Ken to use the parce clavem to take control of the Pentaverate. Ken refuses, and Bruce attempts to flee but Anthony arrives and tackles him through the hole in the floor. Realizing the Pentaverate has been fallen into nefarious hands at their wrongdoings, Lordington, Mishu, and Shep enact the Demetrious Protocols. They vote, exposing cyanide pills and allowing them to commit suicide. In his dying breath, Lordington reveals that Ken's kind and empathetic soul is able to save MENTOR. As Lordington dies, Ken's soul fuses with MENTOR, sacrificing himself in the process. One year later, Patty, Reilly, and KENTOR are all part of the new Septaverate secret society, an organization with the same mission as the Pentaverate, but more diverse and representative of the world they serve.

== Production ==
=== Development ===
On April 17, 2019, it was announced that Mike Myers would create and star in an untitled Netflix comedy. Myers also executive produces along with John Lyons and Jason Weinberg. In June 2021, the series' title was announced as The Pentaverate, based on the conspiracy theories from the 1993 film So I Married an Axe Murderer, which stars Myers as both poet Charlie McKenzie and his Scottish-born father, Stuart McKenzie, who explains the nature & membership of the group in that film. Tim Kirkby joined as director and executive producer, with Tony Hernandez and Lilly Burns also joining as executive producers. In January 2020, Ed Dyson and Roger Drew came on board as co-writers and executive producers. This marked Myers' first starring live-action role since his critically panned romantic comedy The Love Guru from 2008. In early March 2022, Myers opened up an Instagram account posting images relating to the namesake of the series, five days prior to the trailer debut.

Myers has stated that the character Ken Scarborough was a tribute to Canadian local news reporter and print columnist Glenn Cochrane. Scarborough's character was inspired by Cochrane's accent, hairstyle, and polite manner. In Myers' 2017 memoir Canada, he recalls while growing up in Scarborough, Ontario, hearing Cochrane reporting at a sportsmen's show similar to the one depicted in the opening episode. Cochrane reported for CFTO News for 25 years before he died in June 2012.

For the inclusion of the Shrek character, Myers contacted Jeffrey Katzenberg and DreamWorks Animation for permission. Katzenberg happily agreed to have Myers include Shrek in the mini-series due to the actor's relationship with the studio.

=== Themes ===
One of the themes Myers wanted to explore was conspiracy theories. Conspiracy theories and confusion about their degrees of truth recur throughout the show. For example, the Pentavarate's headquarters includes a lunar stage that seems to confirm the faked US Moon landing conspiracy theory. Myers stated at the "Netflix is a Joke" Comedy Festival:

"I really wanted to dedicate this show to local journalists, because right now in this global war between fascism and democracy, you know, the first casualty of war is truth. Getting rid of local news is just the beginning of a slippery slope of all unfalsifiable fact."

=== Casting ===
On June 8, 2021, in addition to Myers himself, Ken Jeong, Keegan-Michael Key, Debi Mazar, Richard McCabe, Jennifer Saunders, and Lydia West were cast. Mazar previously co-starred with Myers in So I Married an Axe Murderer as Tony Giradino's girlfriend, Susan. On March 16, 2022, Jeremy Irons was announced as the series narrator. On April 28, both Rob Lowe and Maria Menounos were announced to be playing fictional versions of themselves.

=== Filming ===
Filming began in late May 2021 and wrapped in late July 2021. Interior scenes were filmed in the newly opened Troubadour Meridian Water Studios in Enfield, North London.

Some interior scenes for the location The Meadows were filmed at Sphinx Observatory in Jungfraujoch, Switzerland and Freemasons Hall, London, which is the headquarters of The United Grand Lodge of England, which is the governing Masonic lodge for the majority of freemasons in England, Wales and the Commonwealth of Nations.

=== Music ===
The soundtrack for the series was composed and recorded by the British electronic duo Orbital. A portion of their 1996 single "The Box" was used as the show's opening theme. The Smash Mouth cover of the song "I'm a Believer", originally by the Monkees, briefly appears in a scene featuring Shrek in reference to its role as part of the film.

== Release ==
All six episodes of the series were released on Netflix on May 5, 2022.

== Reception ==
The review aggregator website Rotten Tomatoes reported a 27% critic approval rating from all critics and a 56% rating from top critics, with an average rating of 4.9/10, based on 25 critic reviews. The website's critics consensus reads, "After a long absence from the screen, Mike Myers returns with an overstuffed farce wherein he plays eight different characters—but unfortunately, almost none of them are funny." On average, top critics reviewed the series slightly more favorably. Robert Levin of Newsday wrote, "The Pentavarate is simultaneously silly and pointless, and a welcome return to form from its star." Metacritic gave the series a weighted average score of 44 out of 100 based on 12 critics, indicating "mixed or average reviews".
