= Instant Mom =

2013 American television sitcom

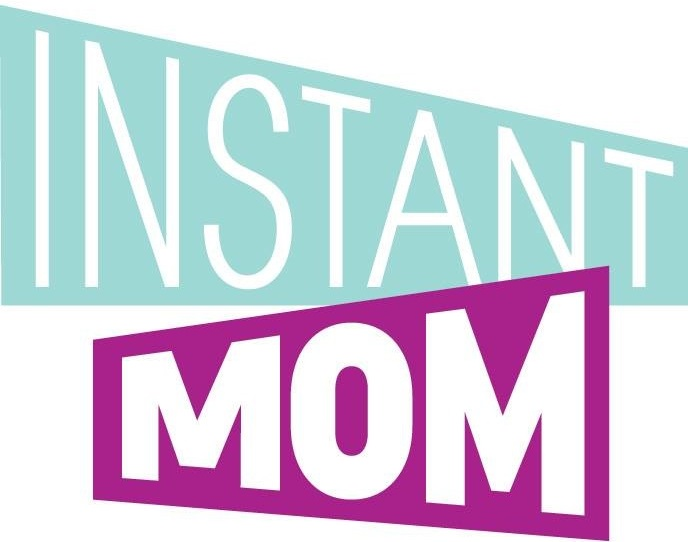
- Genre: Sitcom
- Created by: Jessica Butler & Warren Bell
- Developed by: Howard Michael Gould
- Starring: Tia Mowry-Hardrict; Michael Boatman; Sheryl Lee Ralph; Sydney Park; Tylen Jacob Williams; Damarr Calhoun
- Composer: David Wilde
- Country of origin: United States
- Original language: English
- No. of seasons: 3
- No. of episodes: 65 (list of episodes)

Production
- Executive producers: Howard Michael Gould; Aaron Kaplan
- Producers: Tia Mowry-Hardrict; Chris Arrington
- Production locations: Paramount Studios; Hollywood, California
- Cinematography: Peter Smokler
- Editor: Art Kellner
- Camera setup: Multi-camera
- Running time: 20–22 minutes
- Production companies: Stockholm Syndrome; Kapital Entertainment; Nickelodeon Productions

Original release
- Network: Nick at Nite (seasons 1–2); NickMom (seasons 1–2); TV Land (season 3)
- Release: September 29, 2013 – December 19, 2015

Instant Mom is an American sitcom created by Jessica Butler and Warren Bell and developed by Howard Michael Gould for the NickMom block on the Nick Jr. Channel. It stars Tia Mowry as a stepmother of three children alongside her husband. Michael Boatman, Sheryl Lee Ralph, Sydney Park, Tylen Jacob Williams, and Damarr Calhoun co-star in supporting roles.

The series first aired on September 29, 2013, on both Nickelodeon's Nick at Nite block (at 8:30 p.m.) and the NickMom block (at 10:30 p.m.). The debut was the highest-rated premiere in the history of both blocks. On November 22, 2013, the series was renewed for a second season of 20 episodes. It was renewed for a third season on September 9, 2014. Nickelodeon announced on October 21, 2015, that Instant Mom wouldn't extend beyond its third season and would end its run with the 65 episodes produced. The third season premiered first on another Viacom-owned channel, TV Land.

== Premise ==
Set in Philadelphia, Stephanie Phillips is a food blogger and party girl, who has to drastically tone down her lifestyle when she marries Charlie Phillips, an older man with three children. She now has to be a mother to Charlie's teenage daughter, Gabrielle, and his grade school-age sons James and Aaron. Stephanie has to quickly learn how to be a full-time stepmom with the help of her overbearing mother, Maggie, while attempting to keep her social life active.

== Episodes ==
Season	Episodes	Originally released		
Season	Episodes	First released	Last released	Network
1	23	September 29, 2013	June 12, 2014	Nick at Nite; NickMom
2	16	October 2, 2014	June 3, 2015	Nick at Nite; NickMom
3	26	September 19, 2015	December 19, 2015	TV Land

== Cast and characters ==
- Stephanie Turner-Phillips (Tia Mowry-Hardrict) is the new step-mom and trying to be the best that she can be. She is a food blogger and a party girl.
- Charlie Phillips (Michael Boatman) is Stephanie's older husband who is a doctor and the father of three children by his first wife.
- Maggie Turner (Sheryl Lee Ralph) is Stephanie's mom who often butts into her daughter's personal life, usually with the explanation that she's trying to make the inexperienced Stephanie a better mother when there is a family crisis.
- Gabrielle "Gabby" Phillips (Sydney Park) is the eldest sibling and only daughter of Stephanie and Charlie. She is 15 years old at the start of the series and, like many other teenage girls, she is very fashion-conscious. She is also a very smart honor student. She is seen as the most unimaginably smart, pretty, popular, talented, funny and stylish person ever.
- James Phillips (Tylen Jacob Williams) is the middle sibling of Gabby and Aaron. He is known as the trickster of the family, and is frequently pulling pranks on both his siblings and parents. He doesn't admit it, but he is envious of Gabby's superiority and popularity and tries to pull pranks on her, often having them redirected at him.
- Aaron Phillips (Damarr Calhoun) is the youngest sibling of Gabby and James. He is seen as the child who acts the cutest among all the family members. When he comes to realize this, he starts trying to use it to his advantage.

== Production ==
On August 3, 2012, Nickelodeon announced that it had green-lit the Instant Mom pilot. Tia Mowry-Hardrict, Duane Martin, Sheryl Lee Ralph, Sydney Park, Tylen Williams, and Damarr Calhoun were cast on November 26, 2012. Michael Boatman would later replace Duane Martin. It was announced on April 3, 2013, that Instant Mom was officially picked up for a 13-episode first season to air on NickMom in late 2013. Later on August 19, 2013, Nickelodeon ordered seven additional episodes bringing the series' first season to 20 episodes. On November 22, 2013, six additional episodes were added first season. Both NickMom and Nick at Nite aired episodes on the same nights until the NickMom block closed on September 28, 2015. Filming took place at Paramount Studios in Hollywood, California. The series aired 65 episodes over three seasons, premiering on September 29, 2013, and ending on December 19, 2015. The series outlasted the NickMom programming block by three months.

== Reception ==
=== Critical response ===
Emily Ashby of Common Sense Media gave the show 4 out of 5 stars, saying “The show is predictably fluffy and presents a very sanitary view of life. No one's problems are particularly stressful, and every loose end is neatly tied up by the show's culmination, in keeping with the sitcom tradition. Still, there are some feel-good takeaways that reflect the bonds of families of all sizes and shapes, and the characters (both kids and adults alike) do learn something from the chaos they live through. All in all, this is not a bad choice for families looking for a show to enjoy together.”

Brian Lowry of Variety said that “in terms of bringing anything fresh to the assignment, it’s perhaps a little too well titled, in as much as the moment it’s over, “Mom” is instantly forgotten.” He also stated that the show mirrors Trophy Wife, which premiered the same week as Instant Mom.

=== Awards and nominations ===
Year	Award	Category	Result
2014	20th Annual NAMIC Vision Awards	Comedy	Won
2015	21st Annual NAMIC Vision Awards	Comedy	Nominated
