= NickMom =

American programming block on the Nick Jr. Channel

- Network: Nick Jr.
- Launched: October 1, 2012; 14 years ago
- Closed: September 28, 2015; 11 years ago
- Division of: Nickelodeon
- Country of origin: United States
- Owner: Viacom Media Networks
- Headquarters: Glendale, California
- Sister network: Nickelodeon; TeenNick; Nicktoons; Nick at Nite
- Running time: 4 hours (10 p.m. - 2 a.m.)
- Official website: nickmom.com (archived 2015-09-27 from the original)

NickMom was an American nighttime programming block owned by Viacom Media Networks (now Paramount Media Networks). It aired on the Nick Jr. channel during the watershed hours of 10:00 p.m. to 2:00 a.m. ET, when the channel's regular audience of children would normally be sleeping. The block carried ad-supported comedy programming targeting an adult demographic, particularly young mothers. It aired from October 1, 2012 to September 28, 2015. When NickMom was first announced in 2011, over 30 projects were in development for the block.

Original shows produced for NickMom included the stand-up comedy show called NickMom Night Out, the variety show Parental Discretion with Stefanie Wilder-Taylor, and the docu-comedy show Take Me to Your Mother. The block's highest-rated program was Instant Mom, which was ordered specifically for NickMom but also aired on Nickelodeon's main channel during the Nick at Nite block.

At first, the timing of NickMom generated some controversy. As Nick Jr. only operated a single feed out of the Eastern Time Zone, the channel transitioned into its adult-oriented shows earlier than expected in other time zones. Viacom fixed this issue in February 2013 with the launch of a second Pacific Time Zone-based feed for the channel. The NickMom block lasted for nearly three years, shutting down on September 28, 2015. The NickMom website was also closed, and the domain now redirects to the parental resources section of Nick.com.

== History ==
=== Launch ===
In 2011, Viacom announced that it would launch a new block on Nick Jr. for the 2012-13 television season known as NickMom, which would be aimed towards young mothers, as part of the company's "cradle-to-grave" strategy where viewers grow into watching other Viacom networks (from Nick Jr. to Nickelodeon, then MTV, VH1 and then to CBS and Showtime). The company explained that "today's moms who grew up with Nickelodeon have a renewed relationship with us through their kids", and that the new brand would "offer a destination that is unique in today's entertainment landscape with content that taps into Nickelodeon's comedic DNA". Unlike the network's then commercial-free format, NickMom was to be commercially supported, having reached sponsorship deals with companies including General Mills. Over 30 projects were in development for the block at the time of the announcement.

=== Closure ===
On September 9, 2015, the network's Twitter and Facebook accounts released a statement explaining that the NickMom programming block and website would cease operations by the end of the month.

NickMom ended its nearly three-year run at 2 a.m. ET on September 28 after an airing of the 1994 film Guarding Tess, without any mention of its shutdown. Shortly after, the block's website address was redirected to Nickelodeon's site for parental resources.

== Programming ==
Original programming which launched with the block included Parental Discretion with Stefanie Wilder-Taylor, MFF: Mom Friends Forever, NickMom Night Out, and What Was Carol Brady Thinking?, featuring comedic commentary from Carol Brady within episodes of The Brady Bunch in the style of Pop-Up Video (Florence Henderson herself had no involvement in What Was Carol Brady Thinking?, with commentary penned by writers not involved with the original series).

By June 2013, some of the programs and movies airing on the block had been replaced with syndicated shows already airing on Nick at Nite (or with their rights dormant on that channel), such as That 70s Show, The New Adventures of Old Christine and Yes, Dear. Not including Instant Mom (whose second season aired on Nickelodeon and NickMom, but moved to TV Land for its third), the majority of the block's original shows were canceled due to low ratings or creative differences.

In 2015, movie feature presentations were added to the schedule, with family-friendly and romantic comedies becoming prevalent. After acquiring its syndication rights, NickMom began airing the 2010 iteration of the NBC family drama, Parenthood. In April 2015, the rights for Parenthood were later transferred to Up after NickMom's closure as a complement to Gilmore Girls being carried by that network, since Lauren Graham was featured as a star in both series.

== Controversy ==
The block's timing was met with some controversy. Since the network space operated on only one feed that broadcast on a default Eastern Time Zone schedule, NickMom programming started at earlier times for viewers in different time zones, including as early as mid-afternoon in Hawaii, which was found to be a challenge to parents in those time zones, given the block's adult-oriented humor. Due to concerns over inappropriate content, numerous viewers submitted petitions urging the network to cancel the program and even launched a website to mobilize a campaign against the corporations that advertised during its time slot. The single-feed problem was fixed in mid-February 2013, when a second Pacific Time Zone-based feed for Nick Jr. was launched.

== Ratings ==
Nielsen ratings for the NickMom block's first week dropped 75% from that same period the year prior when Nick Jr. and Noggin programs aired in the timeslot, with some shows registering a "scratch" as being unrated due to a low sample size. A 2013 report from SNL Kagan and distributed by the Parents Television Council, which was opposed to the block, reported that the network's viewership was halved, and of advertisers during the time the most racy of NickMom content was available before the addition of Nick at Nite content, along with a surge in the ratings of competitors Disney Junior and Sprout, which continued to air preschool-targeted programming in primetime. The report noted the ratings were among the lowest in primetime for cable networks. Although the report also listed that the network had a cash flow of -27%, the network ran traditional advertising only during the NickMom block and sustained advertising for the rest of the broadcast day, and mainly was a loss leader as part of Nickelodeon's portion of the Viacom digital cable network suite; those networks usually make little money for the company and feature little to no advertising.
