= Stefanie Wilder-Taylor =

American producer and writer

Stefanie Wilder-Taylor is an American humorist. She worked for years as a writer and producer on game shows including Love Lounge (2005), The Dating Game (1997), and Blind Date (1999). In The New York Times in 2009, Jan Hoffman wrote, "Ms. Wilder-Taylor, a former stand-up comic, has made a career from championing cocktail play-date attitude. With books like Sippy Cups Are Not for Chardonnay and Naptime Is the New Happy Hour and her scabrously funny Web column, 'Make Mine a Double: Tales of Twins and Tequila,' she has been the toast of the antiperfection mom-lit world."

Taylor was born in Queens, New York City. Her father was the standup comedian Stanley Myron Handelman. She has been married to Jon Taylor, a television producer, since 2005. The couple has three children and resides in Encino, California.

== Published works ==
- Drunk-ish: A Memoir of Loving and Leaving Alcohol Gallery Books, January 16, 2024 ISBN 1668019418
- Sippy Cups Are Not for Chardonnay Gallery Books, April 1, 2006 ISBN 1416915060
- Naptime Is the New Happy Hour Simon Spotlight Entertainment, March 25, 2008 ISBN 1416954139
- It's Not Me, It's You: Subjective Recollections from a Terminally Optimistic, Chronically Sarcastic and Occasionally Inebriated Woman Gallery Books, September 14, 2010, ISBN 1439187096
- I'm Kind of a Big Deal: And Other Delusions of Adequacy Gallery Books, June 7, 2011 ISBN 1439176574
- Gummi Bears Should Not Be Organic: And Other Opinions I Can't Back Up With Facts Gallery Books, April 7, 2015 ISBN 1476787301
- In Your Right Mind - a weekly talk radio broadcast.
