= Tim Kirkby =

British film and television director

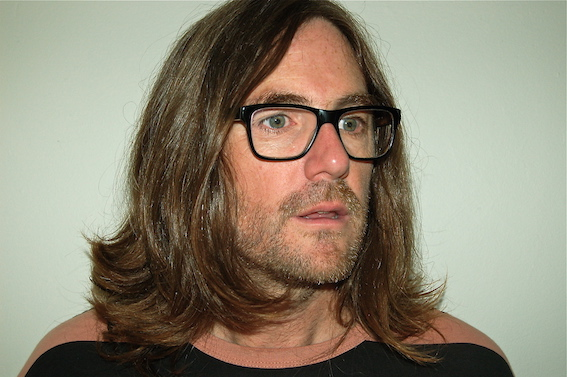
- Kirkby in 2015
- Born: Timothy John Kirkby; 13 November 1970 (age 56); Sidcup, Kent, England
- Occupations: Film & TV Director
- Years active: 2000–present
- Known for: The Pentaverate (2022); Fleabag (2016); Veep (2012–2014); Brockmire (2017)
- Spouse: Kirsty Mckinnell (m. 2006)
- Children: 2

Timothy John Kirkby (born 13 November 1970) is a British filmmaker, working in both the United Kingdom and the United States. He is best known for directing the science parody series Look Around You, the BAFTA winning BBC 2 show Stewart Lee's Comedy Vehicle, and setting up the multi-award-winning Fleabag.

== Career ==
Kirkby made his TV directorial debut with the BAFTA nominated science spoof Look Around You. He received further recognition for the first season of the BAFTA nominated My Mad Fat Diary, the BAFTA nominated BBC single drama The C Word, and more recently the critically acclaimed Fleabag.

In the United States he created and directed all eight episodes and co-executive produced the award-winning first & second season of Brockmire for IFC. Other notable US television directing credits includes episodes of the Emmy-winning HBO comedy Veep (TV series), Grace & Frankie, Brooklyn Nine-Nine, Man Seeking Woman, and his Netflix 6-part TV series The Pentaverate created by Mike Myers, about a secret society that has been working to control world events since 1347.

He has also made documentaries with Motörhead, Iron Maiden, and Judas Priest for the multi-award-winning documentary strand Classic Albums, as well as creating and directing all 4 series of the critically acclaimed BAFTA winning show Stewart Lee's Comedy Vehicle a six-part comedy series featuring standup and sketches. The first season was executive produced by Armando Iannucci and script edited by Chris Morris. The first episode received positive reviews from The Independent and The Daily Mirror, although the show received a negative review, written by Stewart Lee in Time Out, in which he described himself as "fat" and his performance as "positively Neanderthal, suggesting a jungle-dwelling pygmy, struggling to coax notes out of a clarinet that has fallen from a passing aircraft". The second series won a BAFTA for Best Comedy Programme in 2012.

Tim is currently developing a slate of FILM and TV projects, one of which is The Search For The Dice Man based on the novel by Luke Rhinehart.

== Filmography ==
Film

Year	Title	Director	Executive Producer	Notes
2015	The C Word	Yes	No	TV Movie
2018	Action Point	Yes	No	
2021	Last Looks	Yes	No	
2024	Bad Tidings	Yes	No	TV Movie
TBD	This Godless Place	Yes	Yes	

Television

Year	Title	Director	Executive Producer	Notes
2002, 2005	Look Around You	Yes	No	Series 1 & 2, 14 episodes
2002, 2004, 2005	Classic Albums	Yes	No	3 episodes
2007	Kombat Opera Presents	Yes	No	Series 1, episode 4
2010	Little Crackers	Yes	No	Series 1, episode 10
2012	Walking and Talking	Yes	No	4-part serial
2013, 2015	The Alternative Comedy Experience	Yes	No	Series 1 & 2, 25 episodes
2013	My Mad Fat Diary	Yes	No	Series 1, episodes 1, 2, 3
2009, 2011, 2014, 2016	Stewart Lee's Comedy Vehicle	Yes	No	Season 1–4, 24 episodes
2013, 2014	Veep	Yes	Yes	Season 2 & 3, 3 episodes
2014	Playing House	Yes	No	Season 1, 3 episodes
2015	You, Me and the Apocalypse	Yes	No	Season 1, 3 episodes
2015	Man Seeking Woman	Yes	No	Season 1, 3 episodes
2015	Brooklyn Nine-Nine	Yes	No	Season 1, 1 episode
2015	Grace & Frankie	Yes	No	Season 1, 2 episodes
2017, 2018	Brockmire	Yes	Yes	Season 1 & 2, 8 episodes
2018	Fleabag	Yes	No	Pilot/1st episode
2019	Don't Forget the Driver	Yes	No	Series 1, 6 episodes
2019	(Future) Cult Classic	Yes	Yes	Pilot for SyFy Written by Shay Hatten
2022	The Pentaverate	Yes	Yes	Series 1, 6 episodes
2023	The Famous Five	Yes	Yes	3 episodes
2024	Entitled	Yes	Yes	Series 1, 8 episodes
2025	The Revenge Club	Yes	Yes	Series 1, 3 episodes
2028	The Search For The Dice Man	Yes	Yes	6 Part Series in Development

== Awards and nominations ==
Year	Award	Category	Title	Result
2003	British Comedy Awards	Best New Comedy	Look Around You	Nominated
2003	BAFTA TV Awards	Best Comedy	Look Around You	Nominated
2006	ROSE D'OR	Best Comedy	Look Around You	Won
2008	ROSE D'OR	Best of 2008	Kombat Opera	Won
2008	ROSE D'OR	Best comedy	Kombat Opera	Won
2010	BAFTA TV Awards	Best Comedy Programme	Stewart Lee's Comedy Vehicle Series 1	Nominated
2012	British Comedy Awards	Best Comedy Programme	Stewart Lee's Comedy Vehicle Series 2	Won
2012	BAFTA TV Awards	Best Comedy Programme	Stewart Lee's Comedy Vehicle Series 2	Won
2014	OFTA	Best Direction	Veep Series 2	Nominated
2014	RTS	Best Best Drama Series	My Mad Fat Diary	Nominated
2014	BAFTA TV Awards	Best Drama Series	My Mad Fat Diary	Nominated
2014	OFTA	Best Direction	Veep Series 3	Nominated
2014	BAFTA TV Awards	Best Comedy Programme	Stewart Lee's Comedy Vehicle Series 3	Nominated
2015	BAFTA TV Awards	Best Comedy Programme	Stewart Lee's Comedy Vehicle Series 4	Nominated
2016	BAFTA TV Awards	Best Single Drama	The C Word	Nominated
2017	BAFTA TV Awards	Best Comedy	Fleabag	Nominated
2019	Venice TV Award	Best Comedy	Don't Forget The Driver	Nominated

=== Television (as actor) ===
- Look Around You (2005)
