= Teen sitcom =

Situation comedy media aimed towards a teen audience

A teen situation comedy, or teen sitcom, is a subgenre of comedic television program targeted towards young people (tweens, teenagers and, to a lesser extent, young adults). In general, these types of programs focus primarily on characters between 10 and 18 years of age and routinely feature characters involved in humorous situations (either realistic or fantasy in style, depending on the program's plotline), and often focus on the characters' family and social lives. The primary plot of each episode often involves the protagonist(s) the program centers on, while secondary plotlines often focus on the character(s') parents, siblings (those not among the leads, if any) or friends, although the secondary characters may sometimes also or instead be involved in the episode's main plot.

The most common episodic plot lines used in teen sitcoms involve the protagonist(s) dealing with family and friends, ending up in a complicated situation (such as the protagonist's parents not allowing them to try out for a school sports team because of their gender) that the characters must solve by episode's end, getting into moral conflicts with their parents, friends, relatives, or siblings, and coming-of-age situations (such as a first date or learning how to drive); however, more dramatic and shocking plot elements or ones which center on undesirable (such as bullying, anxiety, peer pressure, police brutality, excessive force, underage alcoholism, and possibly even substance abuse) may be featured as well, in what are sometimes called "very special episodes".

Although adolescents are the main audience focus for these programs, these programs are also popular with young adults as well as preteens. Older adults may enjoy them for nostalgic purposes. Like teen dramas, this genre was also generally non-existent during the first 30 years of television.

== History ==
=== 1940s–1980s ===
When sitcoms reached their peak in the 1950s and 1960s, these programs were supposed to be family-oriented. Sitcoms of the 1950s and 1960s such as Leave It to Beaver, Father Knows Best, The Adventures of Ozzie and Harriet and The Donna Reed Show were popular with teenagers, along with the entire family. The teen movie genre was popular during the 1960s and led the way towards the teen sitcom genre.

The earliest ancestor of the teen sitcom was Meet Corliss Archer, a TV adaptation of a popular radio show about a teenage girl which aired briefly in syndication in 1954. The first teen sitcom on a major network was The Many Loves of Dobie Gillis, a 1959–1963 CBS sitcom based on collegiate short stories by humorist Max Shulman. Dobie Gillis followed the adventures of a teenage boy and his friends through high school, the military, and college, and was the first American network television program to feature teenagers (played by Dwayne Hickman and Bob Denver, actors in their twenties at the time) as its lead characters.

In the mid-1960s, the creation of sitcoms such as The Monkees and Gidget were primarily targeted towards teenage audiences. The 1969–1974 ABC sitcom The Brady Bunch was popular with younger audiences, especially pre-teens and younger teenagers, as was its competitor The Partridge Family, which premiered in 1970. These shows are similar to the "tween" orientated shows that have aired in more recent years such as Hannah Montana. The 1970s also featured teen sitcoms such as What's Happening!!, Happy Days and Welcome Back, Kotter.

During the 1980s, television series such as The Facts of Life, Silver Spoons, Square Pegs, Family Ties, The Hogan Family, Who's the Boss?, Growing Pains, The New Leave It to Beaver, ALF, My Two Dads, and Good Morning, Miss Bliss (later known as Saved by the Bell) were extremely popular especially among the younger demographic.

=== 1990s onward ===
Teen-oriented sitcoms have become more popular since the 1990s; during that decade, these types of programs gradually became fairly common on both broadcast and cable networks. Although pertinent social issues relating to the demographic were featured in earlier series, Blossom regularly focused on such issues, with episodes dealing with subject matter such as drug use, guns and teen sex.

==== ABC ====
Several sitcoms aired on ABC during the early and mid-1990s were aimed primarily at teenage audiences as well as families; most of them aired as part of TGIF, the network's popular Friday night comedy block that originally ran from 1989 to 2000. Such examples include Step by Step (which focused on a blended family and regularly focused on the exploits of the six younger characters), Boy Meets World (similar in format to The Wonder Years, which ended before Boy Meets World debuted in 1993, both of which focused on a boy dealing with the challenges that come with growing into adolescence) and Family Matters (which originated as a family sitcom spun off from the family-friendly though adult-centered Perfect Strangers, but soon shifted more of its focus towards its teenage characters due to the popularity of the character of nerdy high school (and later, college) student Steve Urkel).

Other short-lived series that featured teenage protagonists included Sister, Sister (which aired during the 1994–1995 season but was cancelled and promptly moved to The WB and Clueless (aired on ABC during the 1996–1997 season and later moved to UPN; based on the hit 1995 comedy film starring teen idol Alicia Silverstone).

One of the TGIF's biggest hits was Sabrina, the Teenage Witch which debuted in 1996. It starred Melissa Joan Hart whom was previously known to young audiences in the hit Nickelodeon teen sitcom Clarissa Explains It All which aired from 1991 to 1994. Sabrina was based on a popular Archie Comics character that was featured in an animated series from the early 1970s and a 1996 TV movie of the same name that aired on Showtime. The franchise focused on the adventures of the eponymous main character who tries to live a normal life as a teenager and later young adult while dealing with being a half-witch/half-mortal; Sabrina ran for four seasons on ABC and an additional three on The WB).

Though TGIF was originally geared towards families, the success of Sabrina, The Teenage Witch and Boy Meets World which had its teenage cast become teen idols and the transfer of its more successful sitcoms like Step by Step and Family Matters (which by that point was more focused on the young adult cast) to CBS in 1997, led to the block's shift towards teen-oriented sitcoms that fall. In order to capitalize on the success of Sabrina, TGIF introduced two new fantasy comedies (albeit with male protagonists): Teen Angel (which heavily leaned towards a teenage demographic with its three male protagonists) and You Wish (which had more a family-oriented demographic). However, neither managed to find an audience and were cancelled after only a season.

Another attempt at a teenage demographic came with the 1999 sitcom Odd Man Out which heavily promoted its teenage lead star Erik Von Detten (nicknamed "EVD") who was already popular with the teenage female audience from his previous roles in Disney media such as So Weird and Brink! and the Universal film Leave It to Beaver. However like Teen Angel, it failed to reach its intended audience and was cancelled after one season. Detten would later star in another short-lived TGIF sitcom, Complete Savages (2004-2005) which consisted of a predominantly teenage male cast with a dysfunctional sibling dynamic a la Malcolm in the Middle.

Over time, the Big Three television networks (ABC, CBS and NBC) began shifting away from family-oriented comedies toward comedy series focused on adults (although some family comedies have continued to return on those networks since then), teen sitcoms for the most part began to shift more towards broadcast networks intentionally aimed at younger audiences than the Big Three and cable television.

==== NBC ====
In 1989, the sitcom Saved by the Bell (a retooling of the 1987–88 Disney Channel comedy Good Morning, Miss Bliss) premiered on NBC. The series quickly became a fan favorite and one of the most highly rated and popular teen shows of all time. Saved by the Bell had its main characters go through typical teen issues and the drama of high school, though the series was comical and the issues were often resolved before the end of the episode. Notably, Saved by the Bell featured teenage archetypes and stereotypes. Saved by the Bell kept its Saturday morning slot until 1993, when it ended after four seasons (by the final season, two main characters – Kelly Kapowski (Tiffani Thiessen) and Jessie Spano (Elizabeth Berkley) – departed from the series and were replaced by a new character).

Saved by the Bell spawned a short-lived spin-off Saved by the Bell: The College Years, which aired in primetime and only lasted one season; another spin-off, Saved by the Bell: The New Class, lasted for seven years (although it was notable for reusing plotlines originating in episodes of the original Saved by the Bell series). The series was responsible for the creation of NBC's TNBC Saturday morning block, which was targeted towards teenagers. The block also featured comedies such as California Dreams (focusing on an aspiring band), Hang Time (centering on the players and cheerleaders of a high school basketball team), City Guys (centering on the developing friendship of two New York City high school students of different backgrounds and races) and One World (focusing on a family in which all six children are adopted from different backgrounds). The vast majority of the series on the TNBC block were executive produced by Peter Engel.

==== Fox, The WB and UPN ====
Fox, The WB and UPN were each launched (respectively in 1986 and 1995) with target audiences aimed at teenagers and young adults between the ages of 13 and 34. Fox aired teen dramas such as Beverly Hills, 90210 and Party of Five and sitcoms such as That '70s Show, Malcolm in the Middle, Married... with Children (in which its teen characters, who grew into adults over the 11-year run sometimes alternated between being part of the main plot and the secondary plot) and Parker Lewis Can't Lose.

That '70s Show was a hit with both teenage and adult audiences, and focused on the lives of six teenage friends living in Wisconsin between 1976 and 1979; despite the short time period it was set in, the sitcom aired for eight years on Fox due to the use of a floating timeline. While Malcolm in the Middle was targeted towards an adult demographic, it featured a predominantly adolescent-to-young adult male cast which led to its popularity with younger viewers and launched the career of teen idol Frankie Muniz.

The WB and UPN were popular destinations for teen sitcoms. The WB's earliest comedies with teens as the central characters included Sister, Sister (which originated on ABC from 1994 to 1999; about teenage twin sisters who accidentally reunite while at a clothing store with their respective adopted parents after being separated after they were born 15 years earlier, resulting in Tia Landry (Tia Mowry) and her mother Lisa (Jackée Harry) moving in the house belonging to Tamera Campbell (Tamera Mowry) and her father Ray (Tim Reid)) and Unhappily Ever After (originally centering on the divorcing parents of three children, but shifted its primary focus on the latter characters, specifically attractive but intelligent redhead Tiffany Malloy (Nikki Cox) and her less-than-bright brother Ryan (Kevin Connolly)).

In 2002, What I Like About You debuted on The WB – centering on spontaneous, wild 16-year-old Holly Tyler (portrayed by former Nickelodeon star Amanda Bynes), who convinces her father – who accepts a job position in Japan – to let her live with her neurotic, uptight older sister Valerie (portrayed by former 90210 star Jennie Garth). In general, The WB put much of its programming focus during the network's 11-year existence on teen-oriented series (attempting to broaden its audience in its final two years), which alongside comedy series had also included dramas such as Buffy the Vampire Slayer and One Tree Hill.

UPN's sitcoms largely (with few exceptions) were aimed at African-American audiences; such programs aimed at teens included Moesha, which focused on African-American teenager Moesha Mitchell (portrayed by singer Brandy) and her family and friends. The 2001–06 sitcom One on One, centered on Breanna Barnes (Kyla Pratt), who (in a relatively similar concept as What I Like About You) convinces her mother to let her live with her father Flex Washington (Flex Alexander), a former basketball star who became a father to Breanna at age 18. Both The WB and UPN were shut down in September 2006, and were replaced by The CW (which carried series from both predecessor networks, including Everybody Hates Chris, which was loosely based on the adolescence of actor/comedian Chris Rock). The CW dropped sitcoms from its schedule in 2009 (when Everybody Hates Chris and the adult-targeted dramedy The Game were canceled), to focus more on its drama and reality series.

==== MTV ====
The creation of MTV in 1981 had gathered a majority of the teenage audience with the airing of back-to-back music videos. Over time (beginning in the early 1990s), MTV gradually shifted into its current format as a lifestyle and pop culture channel that airs a limited amount of music videos, mostly during the late night and early morning hours, instead focusing on reality shows, soap operas, sports, documentaries and music-related programs.

MTV aired series targeted towards teenagers such as TRL, a daily music countdown show; Laguna Beach: The Real Orange County, a reality show focused around a group or rich teenagers living in California; and the latter's spinoff The Hills, which centered on former Laguna Beach cast member Lauren Conrad and her internship at Teen Vogue. During the 1990s, MTV aired the controversial animated series Beavis and Butt-Head, which focused on the antics of two idiotic teenage slackers and their unsuccessful attempts at getting girls, though they often displayed gross, violent and crude behavior; a spinoff about one of the lead characters' former classmates, Daria, premiered in 1997 and focused around a cynical, sarcastic, intelligent yet monotone teenage girl and her stereotype-infested high school. In 2010, MTV premiered its first live action teen sitcom The Hard Times of RJ Berger, which became an instant hit although it would be canceled after two seasons. Awkward, which debuted in 2011, was another hit for the network and focuses on a teenage girl who tries to navigate through adolescence after the circumstances of a bathroom accident after reading an anonymous letter written about her, result in her notoriety once her high school classmates believe she attempted suicide.

==== Nickelodeon ====
Children's cable channel Nickelodeon had begun its own trend of producing teen sitcoms in the late 1980s; one of the earliest was the 1989–93 series Hey Dude, which focused on a group of teenagers working at a dude ranch; the network's most popular comedy of the 1990s was Clarissa Explains It All, running from 1991 to 1994 and starring then-unknown actress Melissa Joan Hart, which focused around Clarissa Darling, a typical teenager that faced typical teen issues and an aggravating younger brother. The series debunked a long-held belief that a children's series that centered on a female character would not be popular with boys, in fact, Clarissa was widely popular among children of both genders (Hart would later star in the hit sitcom Sabrina, the Teenage Witch which further would catapult her further into teen stardom).

In the same year as Clarissa, Nickelodeon also premiered Salute Your Shorts, a sitcom following the various hijinks of teenage campers at Camp Anawanna and Welcome Freshmen, a subversive take on the high school sitcom which featured a mix of comedy skits, a glaring lack of educational and moral lessons, sexual innuendo and cynical main characters. However, neither managed to reach the success of Clarissa which outlived both series by a year. The year 1992 saw the introduction of the network's popular long-running primetime block SNICK (contraction of Saturday Night Nick) and the network's first in-house sketch comedy/variety series Roundhouse. While hugely unsuccessful in the ratings, Roundhouse still was innovative in some ways such as featuring a large diverse teenage cast and an urban setting which stood out from the predominantly white suburban environment of the Nickelodeon's past series.

From 1993 to 1994, Nickelodeon aired The Adventures of Pete & Pete (which grew to have a strong cult following over the years), The Secret World of Alex Mack (a female driven series like Clarissa which was also a success, having a four-year run) and the short-lived My Brother and Me (which serves as a milestone as Nickelodeon's first black sitcom). The year 1994 marked the premiere of highly successful sketch comedy series All That which highlighted a multiethnic cast similar to its predecessor Roundhouse but unlike its predecessor, All That enjoyed a decade of popularity ending its long run in 2005. All That was also a vital starting point of Dan Schneider's relationship with Nickelodeon and started the careers of several successful teen actors associated with the network's brand.

In 1996, Nickelodeon debuted Kenan & Kel (the first spin-off of All That which became a hit sitcom for the network), in 1998, Cousin Skeeter, and in 1999, The Amanda Show (the second spin-off of All That which remains one of Nickelodeon's highest rated series and launched the career of teen idol Amanda Bynes) and 100 Deeds for Eddie McDowd.

From the 2000s onward, Nickelodeon has aired The Brothers García, Noah Knows Best, As Told by Ginger, The Nick Cannon Show (spun-off from All That), Taina (a predecessor to Victorious), Drake & Josh (spun-off from The Amanda Show), Romeo!, Unfabulous, Ned's Declassified School Survival Guide, Zoey 101 (spun-off from All That), Mr. Meaty, Just Jordan, iCarly (spun-off from Drake & Josh and grew to become one of longest-running and the highest rated live-action series in Nickelodeon history), True Jackson, VP, Big Time Rush, The Troop, Bucket & Skinner's Epic Adventures, How to Rock, Victorious (served as the launching pad for pop star Ariana Grande's music career), Sam & Cat (spun-off from iCarly and Victorious), Supah Ninjas, Life with Boys and Every Witch Way all of which targeted kids and older teens, as well as families as a whole. By 2013, Nickelodeon decided to rebrand from airing teen shows (along with Nicktoons) to targeting and airing shows for a younger demographic of ages 2-11, such as Henry Danger, The Thundermans, Bella and the Bulldogs, Nicky, Ricky, Dicky & Dawn, Talia in the Kitchen and Game Shakers.

Its teen comedies, as well as animated and dramatic series, populated the long-running SNICK block that ran from 1992 to 2005. SNICK would start to be replaced by TEENick as the network's block for teen comedy starting in 2001 until 2009.

==== Disney Channel ====
Launched in 1983, Disney Channel was originally a premium channel geared towards young children, families and adults. However, in 1988, the channel made its first attempt to appeal to an adolescent audience with its first original sitcom Good Morning, Miss Bliss. Miss Bliss detailed the lives of middle schoolers who got into various wacky adventures but had the guidance of their kind-hearted homeroom teacher Miss Bliss (portrayed by Hayley Mills of The Parent Trap fame). It was short-lived and was retooled later into NBC's Saved by the Bell which enjoyed much more success on the broadcast network and syndication.

Another attempt came with 1989 reboot of The Mickey Mouse Club (MMC) which contained a mix of sketch comedy, musical and dance numbers (often covers of then-popular pop songs), celebrity guest stars and serial dramas. As opposed to its counterpart Kids Incorporated (also airing on Disney Channel) which was aimed squarely at children, MMC's demographic skewed towards older children and teenagers. It was not only a huge success for the premium channel but served as a testing ground for the channel's earliest attempts at creating a brand of teen pop stars. Two pop groups were spawned from the variety show: The Party and MMC, both contained the most popular cast members at the time. A few years after MMC ended, a handful of former cast members would go on to have successful careers in music and film including: Britney Spears, Ryan Gosling, Justin Timberlake and JC Chasez (who both became members of the popular boy band *NSYNC), Christina Aguilera and Keri Russell.

During the 1990s and 2000s, Disney Channel would begin to air reruns of teen-themed comedies and dramas with foreign and Canadian imports such as Eerie, Indiana, The Baby-Sitters Club, Ready or Not, The Torkelsons, Growing Pains, Brotherly Love, Smart Guy, Ocean Girl, Dinosaurs, Honey, I Shrunk the Kids: The TV Show, Boy Meets World, Sister, Sister, Life with Derek and Naturally, Sadie.

In 1997, Disney Channel began the transition into the basic cable market (which was completed nationwide by 2002) and underwent a network overhaul. This overhaul involved the network shifting its main focus to "tweens" and young teenagers which culminated in the 1998 launch of the Zoog Disney brand. Zoog Disney was a primetime and weekend block hosted by animated teenage cyber-creatures called "Zoogs" and featured original series and films, live concerts and music videos of current teen pop artists, exclusive behind-the-scenes footage of upcoming Disney films, extreme sports clips and interstitials that promoted usage of the internet. These new original series included: Flash Forward (a coming-of-age comedy about two best friends in their last year of middle school), The Jersey (a sports-themed comedy about a magical jersey that places its teenage protagonists into the bodies of famous athletes), The Famous Jett Jackson (a dramedy about the star of an action television action series trying to balance life as a normal teenager), Bug Juice (a reality show about the adventures of teenagers at summer camp), So Weird (a dramatic sci-fi series focusing around a teenage girl who attracts the paranormal/occult and often has to battle potential threats to humanity), In a Heartbeat (a drama focusing on the lives of several teenagers who volunteer as part-time EMTs while going to school and trying to maintain their lives as normal teenagers) and Even Stevens, (a comedy about a misfit in a family of high achievers).

Disney Channel's first truly successful sitcom was Lizzie McGuire, which centered on a junior high school girl dealing with the onset of puberty, trying to become popular and other teen issues. It was followed two years later (in 2003) by That's So Raven, a comedy which mixed fantasy and real-life issues (centering on a girl who has psychic abilities that are only known by her friends and family), this also became a major hit for Disney Channel; it was also the first Disney Channel series both to last four seasons and to reach 100 episodes.

The success of That's So Raven ultimately led to more "high concept" series to be produced for the channel, the most notable of which include Hannah Montana (centering on a girl who, until the series' fourth and last season, led a secret double life as a teen pop star; the series surpassed its predecessors in terms of popularity), The Suite Life of Zack & Cody (centering on twin brothers living in a hotel where their mother works as a singer and a smart blonde and a dumb Asian live here; it led to a spin-off set on a cruise ship featuring the majority of the original series' main cast, The Suite Life on Deck) and Wizards of Waverly Place (which surpassed That's So Raven as the longest-running Disney Channel series by number of episodes, ending its run with 106 episodes, and centered on three siblings vying to become the sole wizard of their family). The channel continues to produce comedies with a "high concept" plot, such as Jessie (focusing on a woman from Texas who becomes a nanny to four upper-class New York City children), Shake It Up (about two teenage girls who are dancers on a local music show), A.N.T. Farm (about middle school students transferred into a gifted high school education program), Austin & Ally (about a teen pop singer's relationship with a teenage songwriter) and Dog with a Blog (about a family whose pet dog is able to talk). However, shows with a more basic plotline are also featured such as Good Luck Charlie (focusing on the Duncan Family adjusting to the recent arrival of a new baby), Liv and Maddie (focusing on teenage twin sisters, one of whom is a former sitcom star, adjusting to life together in the same high school), I Didn't Do It (which outlines an incident involving the two lead characters each episode as explained by them), and Girl Meets World (which focuses on Boy Meets World characters, Cory and Topanga Matthews' teenage daughter, Riley as she navigates the challenges of life and being a teenager) which are all fairly popular with teenage audiences, as well as older children and young adults.

Disney Channel's comedy series, while not exclusively targeted for that audience, are geared more towards teen and preteen girls; in contrast, the channel's male-oriented spin-off network Disney XD, features series aimed at boys, although shows on each network are widely popular among both genders. Disney XD's sitcoms have included Zeke and Luther (about two teenage skateboarders), Crash & Bernstein (about a 12-year-old boy's friendship with a living puppet), Mighty Med (about a hospital for superheroes), I'm in the Band (about a teenage boy recruited as the new guitarist to a washed-up heavy metal band), Kickin' It (about a group of teenage students at a martial arts academy), Lab Rats (about three teen superheroes and a normal boy) and Pair of Kings (about two fraternal twin brothers who are connected to a royal family from a faraway kingdom).

== See also ==
- List of teen sitcoms
- Teen magazine
- Very special episodes
