= History of Nickelodeon =

Historical timeline

Nickelodeon logo since March 4, 2023 (Note: The logo's wordmark has been in use since September 28, 2009. The variant displayed is meant to be used for white backgrounds; the main variant has a white wordmark in conjunction with a fully orange splat.)

Nickelodeon (often shortened to Nick) is an American basic cable and satellite television network that is part of the Nickelodeon Group, a corporate umbrella within the television division of Skydance Corporation, which focuses on programs for children, families and teenagers ages 2 to 15 years old.

== 1977–1979: C-3 ==
Nickelodeon's concept was created by Dr. Vivian Horner, an educator and the director of research on the PBS series The Electric Company. She created the first Nickelodeon series, Pinwheel. Pinwheel premiered on December 1, 1977, as part of QUBE, an early local cable television system that was launched in Columbus, Ohio by Warner Cable Corp. One of the ten "community" channels that were offered to QUBE subscribers was C-2, which exclusively broadcast Pinwheel each day from 7:00 a.m. to 5:00 p.m. Eastern Time. The channel was later moved to C-3 and the hours were extended to 7:00 a.m. to 9:00 p.m. Eastern Time. It was originally a preschool channel until 1979. Pinwheel became successful enough for Horner to expand her idea into a full channel on national television over a year later.

Nickelodeon was originally seen as a loss leader for then-parent company Warner Cable. As the company saw it, having a commercial-free children's channel would prove useful in franchising its cable systems across the country, with that advantage putting them over rival companies such as Time Inc.'s HBO.

== 1979–1984: The start of Nickelodeon ==
Nickelodeon's pre-launch logo from 1978, designed by creative consultant Joseph Iozzi. Font by Lubalin, Smith, Carnase, Inc.

Initially scheduled for a February 1979 launch, Nickelodeon was officially launched on April 1, 1979 (as the first-ever children's network) on Warner Cable franchises across the country. (The launch date, coincidentally, was Vivian Horner's birthday.) Initial programming on Nickelodeon included Pinwheel, Video Comic Book, America Goes Bananaz, Nickel Flicks, and By the Way, all of which originated at the QUBE studios in Columbus. For its first few years, Pinwheel was the network's flagship series, and it was played for three to five hours a day in a block format.

Vivian Horner asked her co-workers to help come up with a list of possible names for the network. Sandy Kavanaugh (the producer of Pinwheel) proposed "Nickelodeon", even though she was not fully satisfied with it. In 2013, she recalled, "I was not thrilled with 'Nickelodeon.' It was whimsical sounding, though. It had a fun lilt.".

The channel's pre-launch logo and advertising campaign name were created by New York-based creative director/designer Joseph Iozzi. The logo incorporated a man looking into a nickelodeon machine that was placed in the "N" in the wordmark. The first model ever used in a Nickelodeon advertisement was the designer's son, Joseph Iozzi II, while the logo's font was designed by Lubalin, Smith, Carnase, Inc. The intent of Iozzi was to replace the graphic of the line illustration of the man peering into the Nickelodeon with a period illustration of a boy in knickers, British flat cap, big suspenders, tip toed on a stylish iron train step looking into the Nickelodeon font. Available time and new management never permitted the planned re-design.

Nickelodeon logo from 1979 to 1981

Nickelodeon quickly expanded its audience reach, first to other Warner Cable systems across the country, and eventually to other cable providers. By late 1979, Nickelodeon experienced rapid early growth following its national expansion. According to TVC Programming, the network surpassed one million subscribers two months ahead of internal projections, with Warner Cable reporting strong early adoption across multiple markets. At the time, Nickelodeon was overseen by general manager Nyhl Henson , who credited the channel’s fast growth to its distinctive children’s programming strategy and strong viewer engagement. It was distributed via satellite on RCA Satcom-1, which went into orbit one week earlier on March 26 – originally transmitted on transponder space purchased from televangelists Jim and Tammy Faye Bakker. The channel was originally uplinked, along with sibling network Star Channel, from a facility located at Buffalo, NY television station WIVB-TV; by December 1980, it was announced that uplink of both channels would move into a new facility in Hauppauge, NY along with new sibling channel MTV (after a planned expansion to the Buffalo facility was scrapped when Warner-Amex was unable to come to a deal with Channel 4's ownership over a long-term lease). Despite its prior history as a part of the QUBE system, Nickelodeon designates 1979 as the year of the channel's official launch.

As Nickelodeon originally operated as a commercial-free service, the network ran interstitials between programs, consisting of a male mime portrayed by character actor/mime Jonathan Schwartz doing tricks in front of a black background. At the time of its launch, Nickelodeon's programming ran on weekdays from 8:00 a.m. to 11:00 p.m. and on weekends from 8:00 a.m. to midnight Eastern and Pacific Time. Sibling network Star Channel (later known as The Movie Channel) would take over the channel space after Nickelodeon's broadcast day ended.

On September 14, 1979, American Express reached an agreement with Warner Communications to buy 50% of Warner Cable Corporation for $175 million in cash and short-term notes. Through the formation of the joint venture, which was incorporated in December of that year, both Star Channel and Nickelodeon were folded into Warner-Amex Satellite Entertainment (later Warner-Amex Cable Communications), a company which handled the operations of the group's cable channels (Warner Cable was folded into a separate jointly owned unit, the Warner Cable Corporation).

New shows were added to the Nickelodeon lineup in 1980, including Dusty's Treehouse, First Row Features, Special Delivery, What Will They Think Of Next? and Livewire. Cy Schneider became Nickelodeon's president that same year; the channel's early years were referred to years later as the "green vegetable era", as it focused mainly on programs that parents thought were good and appropriate for children, but not necessarily what the children themselves wanted to see.

A flat color version of the 1981–1984 Nickelodeon wordmark, without the silver ball behind it

On April 12, 1981, Nickelodeon shifted its daily programming to thirteen hours every day, now airing from 8:00 a.m. to 9:00 p.m. Eastern and Pacific Time, seven days a week. Nickelodeon also introduced a new logo designed by Lou Dorfsman and Bob Klein, consisting of a silver ball overlaid by multicolored "Nickelodeon" text. By this time, The Movie Channel had become a separate 24-hour channel, and Nickelodeon had begun turning over its channel space during its off-hours to the Alpha Repertory Television Service (ARTS) – a fine arts-focused network owned by the Hearst Corporation and ABC joint venture Hearst/ABC Video Services.

Later in 1981, the Canadian sketch comedy series You Can't Do That on Television made its American debut on Nickelodeon, becoming the channel's first hit series. The green slime originally featured on that program was later adopted by Nickelodeon as a primary feature of many of its shows, including the game show Double Dare, as well as becoming a signature of the network in general. Other shows that were part of Nickelodeon's regular schedule during its early years included The Third Eye, Standby...Lights! Camera! Action! and Mr. Wizard's World.

ARTS became the Arts & Entertainment Network (A&E) in 1984, after ARTS merged with NBC's struggling cable service The Entertainment Channel. Around this time, Warner-Amex Satellite Entertainment began divesting its assets and spun off Nickelodeon and music network MTV into the newly formed subsidiary MTV Networks; to increase revenue, Nickelodeon began to accept corporate underwriting (a method common in public television) for its programming.

External videos
- Nickelodeon ORIGINAL mime, 1980–1981, YouTube

== 1984–1991: Establishing the network's identity ==
The fourth and most popular logo with the Balloon font was used for almost 25 years from October 1, 1984, to September 28, 2009

One of many logos used from 1984 to 1993. This logo was also used as the sign of Nickelodeon Studios in Orlando until its demise.

Nickelodeon struggled at first, operating at a loss of $10 million by 1984. The network had lacked successful programs (shows on the network that failed to gain traction during its first few years included Against the Odds and Going Great), which stagnated viewership, at one point finishing dead last among all U.S. cable channels.

After firing its management staff, MTV Networks president Bob Pittman turned to Fred Seibert and Alan Goodman, who had created MTV's iconic channel IDs a few years earlier, to reinvigorate Nickelodeon, leading to what many believe to be the start of the channel's "Golden Age". Seibert and Goodman's company, Fred/Alan Inc., teamed up with Tom Corey and Scott Nash of the advertising firm Corey McPherson Nash to rebrand the network. The "pinball" logo was replaced with a new one featuring varied orange backgrounds (a "splat" design) with the "Nickelodeon" name overlaid in the Balloon typeface, which would be used in hundreds of different variations for nearly a quarter of a century. Fred/Alan also enlisted the help of animators, writers, producers and doo-wop group The Jive Five (best known for their 1961 hit "My True Story") to create new channel IDs. The rebranding went into use on October 1, 1984, and within six months, Nickelodeon would become the dominant channel in children's programming and remained so for 26 years, even in the midst of increasing competition in more recent years from other kids-oriented cable channels with Disney Channel and Cartoon Network, and broadcast blocks like Fox Kids and Kids' WB. Nickelodeon also began promoting itself as "The First Kids' Network", due to its status as the first American television network aimed at children. Along with the rebrand, Nickelodeon also began accepting traditional advertising.

In the summer of 1984, A&E announced that it would become a separate 24-hour channel as of January 1985. While younger children had enjoyed Nick's earlier years at their preschool age, older children welcomed the network's change, as Nickelodeon had ascended to becoming a major channel on cable TV. After A&E stopped sharing its channel space, Nickelodeon ran text promos for their daytime shows during the night, before officially becoming a 24-hour channel in June, although some cable systems provided programming from a niche cable television service that had no room on system airing on the channel space, with BET being among the most popular choices. Pittman tasked general manager Geraldine Laybourne to develop programming for the late evening and overnight timeslot; to help with ideas, Laybourne enlisted Seibert and Goodman, who conceived the idea of a classic television block modeled after the "Greatest Hits of All Time" oldies radio format after being presented with over 200 episodes of The Donna Reed Show (a series that Laybourne personally hated). On July 1, 1985, Nickelodeon launched their new nighttime block, Nick at Nite, in the 8 p.m. to 6 a.m. Eastern and Pacific time period.

That same year, American Express sold its stake in Warner-Amex to Warner Communications, who in 1986 turned MTV Networks into a private company, and subsequently sold Nickelodeon, MTV, and the newly launched music video network VH1 to Viacom for $685 million, ending Warner's venture into children's television networks until they launched the Kids' WB block in 1995, and merged with Turner Broadcasting System in 1996. Following the sale in 1987, Games Productions was formed to run the network, operating under the trade name of Nickelodeon Productions. In 1988, the network aired the inaugural Nickelodeon Kids' Choice Awards (previously known as The Big Ballot), a telecast in the vein of the People's Choice Awards in which viewers select their favorites in television, movies and sports. It also rebranded its educational program block of Pinwheel reruns and other preschool-targeted shows as Nick Jr. The first show originally created for the brand was Eureeka's Castle which premiered on September 4, 1989.

On June 7, 1990, Nickelodeon opened Nickelodeon Studios, a hybrid television production facility/attraction and Universal Studios Florida in Orlando, Florida, where many of its sitcoms and game shows were filmed. It also entered into a multimillion-dollar joint marketing agreement with Pizza Hut, which would provide a new kid-targeted publication Nickelodeon Magazine for free at the chain's participating restaurants.

== 1991–1998: Expansion into original animation and scripted programming ==
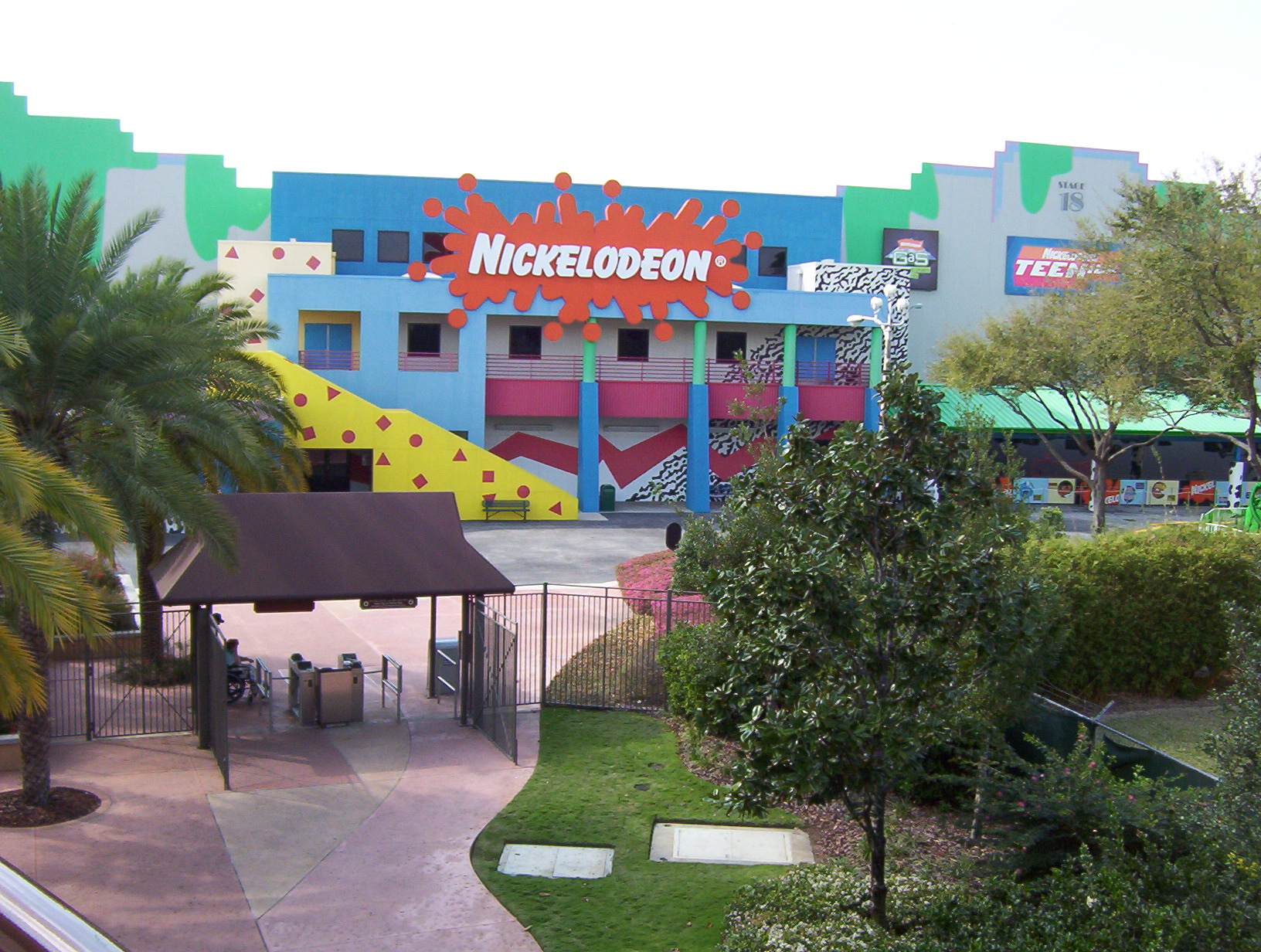
The Nickelodeon Studios building at Universal Studios Florida

Although Nickelodeon had aired externally-produced animation series since the channel's launch in 1977, the network did not air original animated series of its own until the early 1990s. In 1990, eight cartoon pilots were released for test audience but only three were chosen: Doug, Rugrats, and The Ren & Stimpy Show. The other five pilots that were rejected were Big Beast Quintet, Thunder Lizards (both based on one of the channel's network IDs), The Weasel Patrol, The Crowville Chronicles and Trash (the latter two produced by network partner Cosgrove Hall Productions). On August 11, 1991, Nickelodeon debuted their "Nicktoons" brand with three original animated series: Doug from Jumbo Pictures, Rugrats from Klasky Csupo and The Ren & Stimpy Show from Spümcø. The development of these programs was a direct reversal of the network's prior concerns, as Nickelodeon had previously refused to produce weekly animated series due to the high production costs. Ren & Stimpy in particular gained a cult following during its run and became Nickelodeon's most merchandised series at the time, but its infamous behind-the-scenes conflicts and subsequent firing of series creator John Kricfalusi led to the creation of Games Animation. GA was a sub-company of the larger Nickelodeon Animation Studio, which were both created in 1992. In 1993, the network's fourth Nicktoon, Rocko's Modern Life premiered, which had served as the studio's first in-house animated series production which also became a success.

In the meantime, Nickelodeon partnered with Sony Wonder to release episode compilations of the network's programs on VHS, which became top sellers. Following Viacom's purchase of Paramount Pictures in 1994, Nickelodeon would switch its home video distribution to Paramount Home Entertainment, subsequently re-releasing episode compilations of the network's Nicktoons. Doug and Rugrats would both end their production in 1994, with Ren & Stimpy following suit a year later; however, Doug would be revived for three seasons in 1996 as part of ABC's One Saturday Morning lineup, following the show's acquisition by Disney. Rugrats, on the other hand, was revived in 1997 due to strong ratings from reruns, and became an anchor for the network as its top-rated program until being cancelled again in 2004.

One of many logos used from 1993 to 2003. This 'splat' design is one of the most well-known versions of the logo.

On August 15, 1992, the network extended its Saturday schedule by two hours, anchored by the launch of a new primetime block called SNICK from 8:00 to 10:00 p.m. Eastern and Pacific Time; over the years, SNICK became home to shows such as Are You Afraid of the Dark?, Clarissa Explains It All, All That, The Amanda Show, and Kenan & Kel. In 2004, the block was reformatted as the Saturday edition of TEENick, which had originally debuted on Sunday evenings in 2001. The Saturday night block still continues today and was not officially branded from 2009 to 2012, when the "Gotta See Saturdays" brand was adopted for the Saturday morning and primetime blocks; the TEENick branding, with its spelling altered to TeenNick, has been used as the name for a Nickelodeon sister channel since late 2009. After a three-year absence following suspension of the publication in 1990, Nickelodeon resumed Nickelodeon Magazine under a pay/subscription format in June 1993. In March 1993, the channel enlisted the help of viewers to come up with new shapes in which to display its iconic orange logo in the network's promotions. The designs chosen – a cap, a balloon, a gear, a rocket and a top, among other shapes – were mainly 3D renderings, and debuted alongside a new promotional graphics package in May of that year. By the end of 1995, the success of the SNICK block led Nickelodeon to expand its programming into primetime on other nights starting in 1996, with the extension of its broadcast day to 8:30 p.m. Eastern and Pacific Time (and later extended to 9:00 p.m. from 1998 to 2009) on Sunday through Friday nights.

On September 1, 1993, Nickelodeon launched its first international channel, but introduced in the UK on television. A few years later, it launched more channels: Germany and Oceania in 1995, Middle East, Latin America and Scandinavia in 1996 and Asia in 1998.

In 1994, Nickelodeon launched The Big Help, which spawned the spin-off program The Big Green Help in 2007; the program is intended to encourage activity and environmental preservation by children. That same year, Nickelodeon removed You Can't Do That on Television from its schedule after a 13-year run and subsequently debuted a new original sketch comedy show, All That. For many years, until its cancellation in 2005, All That would launch the careers of several actors and actresses including Kenan Thompson, Kel Mitchell, Amanda Bynes, Nick Cannon and Jamie Lynn Spears. Dan Schneider, one of the show's executive producers, would go on to create and produce numerous hit series for Nickelodeon including Kenan & Kel, The Amanda Show, Drake & Josh, Zoey 101, iCarly, Victorious, Sam & Cat (a spin-off of the aforementioned iCarly and Victorious), Henry Danger, and Game Shakers. All the live-action sitcoms produced by Dan Schneider are connected as a shared universe known as the "Schneiderverse" that ran from 1994 to 2018. This 24-year-long franchise ended in 2018 with the cancellation or reworking of current and future series after Schneider was accused of sexual misconduct against several child and adult actors as well as creating a toxic production environment. Also in 1994, Nickelodeon debuted their fifth Nicktoon Aaahh!!! Real Monsters, which would also become a hit series. In October and December 1994, Nickelodeon sold a syndication package of Halloween and Christmas-themed episodes of its Nicktoons to television stations across the United States, in conjunction with then-new corporate relative, Paramount Domestic Television.

On February 13, 1996, Herb Scannell was named president of Nickelodeon, succeeding Geraldine Laybourne, and would hold the position for ten years. Around that time, the sister channel TV Land was launched; with the channel being a pseudo-spinoff of Nickelodeon's Nick at Nite program block. On September 8, 1996, Nick Jr.'s first original animated show Blue's Clues became its first big hit. In 1997, Albie Hecht became president of film and television entertainment for Nickelodeon before leaving to be president of the Viacom network TNN (now called Paramount Network) in 2003.

Up until the 1990s, Saturday morning cartoons had been the most popular children's programs on television. Due to the imposition of educational television mandates on all broadcast stations in 1996, Nickelodeon and other children's-oriented cable networks (never subject to those mandates as they did not broadcast over the air) now had an advantage in that they were not obligated to have its programs comply with the mandate. By 1997, Nickelodeon's Saturday morning lineup had shot ahead of all its broadcast competition, where it would remain for the next several years. Nickelodeon Movies released its first feature-length film in theaters in 1996, an adaptation of the Louise Fitzhugh novel Harriet the Spy starring Michelle Trachtenberg and Rosie O'Donnell. The film went on to earn twice its $13 million budget.

== 1998–2004: Further exploring and marketing programs ==
One of many logos used from 2003 to 2009. This logo was also used for Nickelodeon Movies around the same time period, which was then revived in 2023.

Two years after Harriet the Spy's success, Nickelodeon developed its popular Rugrats Nicktoon onto the big screen with The Rugrats Movie, which grossed more than $100 million in the United States and became the first animated movie not produced by Walt Disney Animation Studios to ever surpass that amount. In 1998, Nickelodeon agreed a deal with Broderbund Software to produce CD-ROM games starting in 1999. Broderbund's successor Mattel Interactive would eventually produce games based on The Wild Thornberrys in 2000 for the Game Boy Color and PlayStation.

On April 28, 1998, Nickelodeon and Sesame Workshop partnered to put together an initial investment of $100 million to start an educational television brand for children and pre-teens aged 6–12. The "kids' thinking channel" was named Noggin (derived from a slang term for "head") to reflect its purpose as an educational medium. Sesame Workshop initially planned for it to be an advertiser-supported service, but later decided that it should debut as a commercial-free network. Noggin officially launched on February 2, 1999, and aired programming from both Sesame Workshop and Nickelodeon's archive libraries.

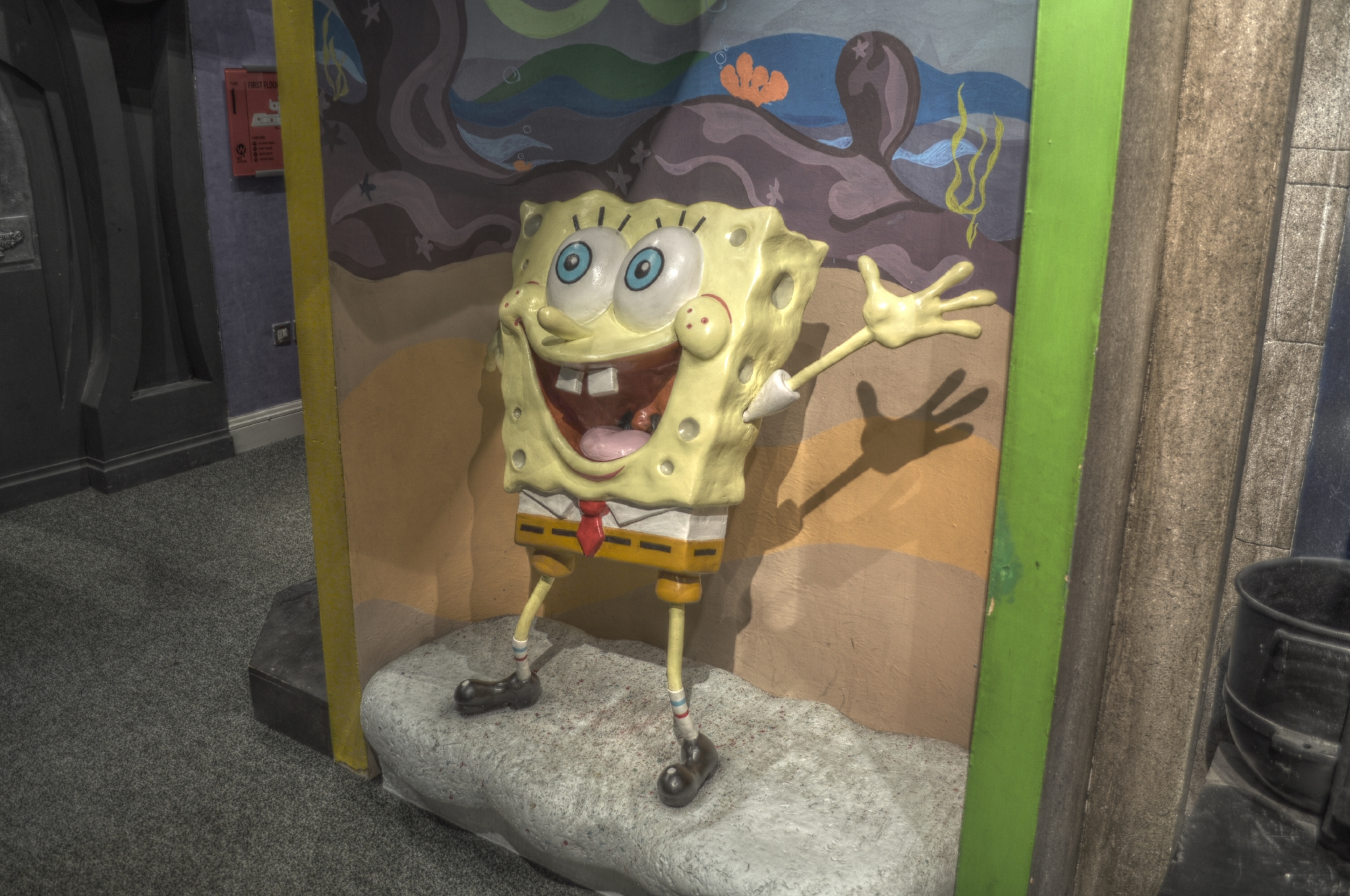
SpongeBob SquarePants has consistently ranked as the channel's highest-rated series since 2000.

On May 1, 1999, the channel previewed the animated series SpongeBob SquarePants directly after the 1999 Kids' Choice Awards. The show would go on to become the most popular Nicktoon in the channel's history, surpassing their previous flagship series Rugrats, and has remained very popular to this day, consistently ranking as the channel's highest-rated series since 2000. By 2001, a third of the series' audience was made up of adults, and the show was run in evening slots. The first film adaptation of SpongeBob SquarePants was announced in 2002 and released in 2004. The ensuing SpongeBob media franchise went on to generate over $13 billion in merchandising revenue for Nickelodeon. After SpongeBob SquarePants became a hit, the Nick Jr. animated show Dora the Explorer premiered on August 14, 2000, which also became a hit and became Nick Jr.'s longest-running animated show.

In 2001, Nickelodeon released its first original animated feature Jimmy Neutron: Boy Genius, which would later be given a TV series called The Adventures of Jimmy Neutron, Boy Genius, which also serves as the sequel to the movie. In the same year, Nickelodeon obtained an extended agreement with THQ to produce video games based on their franchises, such as computer game rights to Rugrats, SpongeBob SquarePants and Rocket Power and console and computer rights to other Nickelodeon shows like The Adventures of Jimmy Neutron, Boy Genius, The Wild Thornberrys, The Fairly OddParents, My Life as a Teenage Robot, Invader Zim, Danny Phantom, As Told by Ginger, ChalkZone and countless others. The agreement also covered games based on original intellectual properties, such as Tak and the Power of Juju, with the potential that THQ would release a game first, followed by an animated cartoon on Nickelodeon. The Fairly OddParents, which originated from Oh Yeah! Cartoons, would also dominate Nickelodeon's time slots, just behind SpongeBob SquarePants, from its original airing from 2001 to 2006 and again during its revival from 2009 to 2017. Also in the same year, the premiere of Rugrats' tenth anniversary episode "All Growed Up" became Nickelodeon's most-watched broadcast up to that point resulting in the show to be given a sequel All Grown Up! which would premiere in 2003. In 2002, Nickelodeon completely became Noggin's owner following its split from Sesame Workshop.

== 2004–2009: Company changes and restructuring ==
In March 2004, Nickelodeon and Nick at Nite were separated in the Nielsen primetime and total day ratings, due to the different programming, advertisers and target audiences between the two services. This caused controversy by cable executives believing this tactic manipulated the ratings, given that Nick at Nite's broadcast day takes up only a fraction of Nickelodeon's programming schedule. Nickelodeon and Nick at Nite's respective ratings periods encompass only the hours they each operate under the total day rankings, though Nickelodeon only is rated for the daytime ratings; this is due to a ruling by Nielsen in July 2004 that networks must program for 51% or more of a daypart to qualify for ratings for a particular daypart.

In February 2005, Nickelodeon premiered the animated series Avatar: The Last Airbender, which quickly became a hit series for the network. Nickelodeon Studios closed on April 30, 2005 and was converted into the Blue Man Group Sharp Aquos Theatre in 2007. Prior to the studio's official closure, Nickelodeon had moved production for most, if not all, of its live-action series to the Nickelodeon on Sunset studios (formerly the Earl Carroll Theatre) in Hollywood, California. Nickelodeon began filming at the studio in 1997, and the company continued to film at the Sunset location until 2017.

On June 14, 2005, Viacom decided to split itself into two companies as a result of the declining performance of its stock, which Sumner Redstone stated "was necessary to respond to a changing industry landscape." On December 31, 2005, Nickelodeon and the remainder of the MTV Networks division, as well as Paramount Pictures, BET Networks, and Famous Music (a record label that the company sold off in 2007), were spun off to the new Viacom. According to Craig Bartlett, the creator of the Nicktoon Hey Arnold!, he would see Nickelodeon inevitably grow more corporate every year. In an unfortunate coincidence, 2005 was NAS's 13th year. The original Viacom was renamed CBS Corporation and retained CBS and its other broadcasting assets, Showtime Networks, Paramount Television (now the separate arms CBS Studios for network and cable production, and CBS Media Ventures for production of first-run syndicated programs and off-network series distribution), advertising firm Viacom Outdoor (which was renamed CBS Outdoor), Simon & Schuster, and Paramount Parks (which was later sold). Both resulting companies began trading on January 3, 2006, and remained controlled by the original Viacom's parent National Amusements.

On January 4, 2006, Herb Scannell resigned from Nickelodeon, and Cyma Zarghami was appointed in his place as president of the newly formed Kids & Family Group, which included Nickelodeon, Nick at Nite, Nick Jr., TEENick, Nicktoons Network, Noggin (and its teen block The N), TV Land, CMT, and CMT Pure Country. In October 2006, the channel struck a deal with DreamWorks Animation to develop the studio's animated films into television series, starting in 2008 with The Penguins of Madagascar following Paramount's contract with the studio to distribute its feature films.

In 2007, Nickelodeon entered into a four-year development deal with Sony Music to produce music-themed TV shows for the network, to help fund and launch tie-in albums and to produce original soundtrack songs that could be released as singles. The Naked Brothers Band, a rock-mockumentary series that tells of a pre-teenage rock band led by two real-life brothers who write and perform the songs, aired on the channel from 2007 to 2009; it was successful for children in the 6–11 age group. By February 2007, the band's song "Crazy Car" was on the Billboard Hot 100, and the soundtrack albums from the first two seasons, each of which signed to Columbia Records, were on Billboard 200. Starting on October 1, 2007, Nickelodeon chose to use a single "splat" logo across its activities.

== 2009–2016: Rebranding and ratings competition ==
Logo used since September 28, 2009; concurrently used with the 2023 logo since March 4, 2023

Short version of logo used since September 28, 2009

In February 2009, the channel decided to brand all of its programming blocks under the Nickelodeon name and as a result, the Nick Jr. and TEENick names on these blocks were discontinued. In the summer of 2009, Nickelodeon unveiled a new logo that would be implemented toward the end of the year, designed by New York City–based creative director/designer Eric Zim. It was part of a year dedicated to strengthening the brand's identity. The logo was intended to create a unified look that can better be conveyed across all of MTV Networks' children's channels. The new logo debuted on September 28, 2009, across Nickelodeon, Nick at Nite and Nicktoons, along with TeenNick (named after the TEENick block) and Nick Jr. (named after the Nick Jr. block) channels, replacing The N and Noggin, respectively. The Nickelodeon game show BrainSurge, as well as the fourth season of Go, Diego, Go! (a spin-off of Dora the Explorer that premiered in September 2005), both premiered that same day. The first new animated show to premiere under the 2009 brand was Fanboy & Chum Chum, while Random! Cartoons, the show that Fanboy & Chum Chum originated from, was the last new animated show to premiere under the 1984 brand. The logo change was met with mixed reactions, particularly from longtime viewers who believed it led to the start of the network’s decline in quality and popularity.

The wordmark logo bug was given a blimp background in the days prior to the 2010 and 2011 Kids' Choice Awards to match the award given out at the ceremony; beginning the week of September 7, 2010, the logo bug was surrounded by a splat design (in the manner of the logo used from 2005 to 2009) during new episodes of Nickelodeon original series. The new logo was adopted in the United Kingdom on February 15, 2010, in Spain on February 19, 2010, in Southeast Asia on March 15, 2010, in Latin America on April 5, 2010, in India on June 25, 2010 and on the ABS-CBN block "Nickelodeon on ABS-CBN" in the Philippines on July 26, 2010. On November 2, 2009, a Canadian version of Nickelodeon was launched, in partnership between Viacom and Corus Entertainment (owners of YTV, which had aired and continued to air Nickelodeon's series); as a result, versions of Nickelodeon now exist in most of North America.

In October 2009 and September 2010, respectively, Viacom acquired the Teenage Mutant Ninja Turtles and Winx Club franchises into the Nickelodeon family. Nickelodeon Animation Studio produced a new CGI-animated Turtles series and new seasons of Winx Club with CGI sequences. Both productions comprised Nickelodeon's strategy to reboot two established brands for new viewers: TMNT was intended to reach an audience of boys aged 6 to 11, and Winx was aimed at the same age group of girls. In February 2011, Viacom acquired a third of Rainbow SpA, the Italian studio that produced Winx Club. The purchase was valued at 62 million euros (US$83 million) and led to new shows being co-developed by Rainbow and Nickelodeon, including My American Friend and Club 57. Also in 2011, Nickelodeon debuted House of Anubis, a series based on the Nickelodeon Netherlands series Het Huis Anubis, which became the first original scripted series to be broadcast in a week daily strip (similar to the soap opera format). Produced in the United Kingdom, it was also the first original series by the flagship U.S. channel to be produced entirely outside of North America.

Nickelodeon's only greenlit series produced under the Sony Music partnership, Victorious, ran from 2010 to 2013. The similar hit music-themed sitcom Big Time Rush ran from 2009 to 2013, and featured a similar partnership with Columbia Records; however, Columbia was only involved with the show's music, and Sony Music became involved with the series' production midway through its first season. It became Nickelodeon's second-most successful live-action show of all time after iCarly; the Big Time Rush episode "Big Time School of Rocque" was watched by 6.8 million viewers for its premiere on January 18, 2010, setting a new record as the highest-rated live action series premiere in the channel's history.

2011 saw Nickelodeon's longtime ratings dominance among all children's cable channels begin to topple: it was the highest-rated cable channel during the first half of that year, only for its viewership to experience a sharp double-digit decline by the end of 2011, described as "inexplicable" by Viacom management. On July 10, 2012, Viacom had a dispute with DirecTV which resulted in Nickelodeon and other Viacom channels being temporarily unavailable on their service. The timing of this removal coincided with two SpongeBob Squarepants marathons that aired that month, including one that was a tribute to Mermaid Man voice actor Ernest Borgnine. In their place, DirecTV aired "Kids Mix" on the Nickelodeon channels, which featured a muti-screen simulcast of eight other children's channels (including Cartoon Network and Disney Channel). Viacom would blame DirecTV for this dispute, even airing commercials on their networks asking viewers to call DirecTV to ask them to keep Nickelodeon on the service. An agreement was eventually reached and the Viacom channels (including Nickelodeon) were restored after several days. In the same year, Noggin was revived as a streaming service.

The channel would not experience a calendar week ratings increase until November 2012 (with viewership slowly rebounding after that point); however its 17-year streak as the highest-rated cable network in total day viewership was broken by Disney Channel during that year. Around late 2012, Nickelodeon made a sweeping change to their network by cancelling or ending their tween and teen shows (including How to Rock, iCarly, Victorious, Bucket & Skinner's Epic Adventures, House of Anubis, Supah Ninjas, Hollywood Heights and Big Time Rush) in favor of newer shows targeted to a younger demographic. On July 17, 2014, the network televised the inaugural Kids' Choice Sports, a spin-off of the Kids' Choice Awards that honors athletes and teams from the previous year in sports. By 2015, the network's ratings fell more than 30% while Disney Channel's ratings increased. However, in 2016, The Loud House premiered, which immediately surpassed The Fairly OddParents in being the network's most successful series after SpongeBob SquarePants and it has been running since.

== 2016–2023: Reviving older properties and expanding across platforms ==
Logo used since March 11, 2017; in which the logo's color is in a slight vermilion tint. Also concurrently used with the 2023 logo since March 4, 2023.

Short version of the logo used since March 11, 2017

In 2016, the network began to produce TV movies based on its older properties, including those of Legends of the Hidden Temple, Hey Arnold!, Rocko's Modern Life, and Invader Zim. The former two aired on the Nickelodeon channel, while the latter two premiered in August 2019 on Netflix.

In June 2018, Cyma Zarghami resigned as president of Nickelodeon, after 33 years of working at the network. In October 2018, All That co-creator Brian Robbins succeeded her as president of Nickelodeon.

In January 2019, Viacom acquired the streaming service Pluto TV, which has since launched several Nickelodeon-branded channels. In August, Viacom acquired the rights to the Garfield franchise, with plans for a new animated TV series. Later that year, Viacom signed a multi-year content production agreement with Netflix to produce several original films and series based on Nickelodeon properties.

In March 2019, Viacom had another contract dispute with DirecTV, almost leading Nickelodeon and other Viacom-owned channels to be removed from the service. Viacom would air similar ads to when this happened in 2012 urging viewers to call DirecTV and ask for them to keep these channels. Contract negotiations did go through, however, and the channels (including Nickelodeon) remained on air without interruption.

After Viacom re-merged with CBS Corporation to form ViacomCBS (now rebranded as "Paramount Skydance") at the end of 2019, it was announced that Nickelodeon content would be available for streaming on CBS All Access. The streaming service would relaunch as Paramount+ on March 4, 2021, with the SpongeBob SquarePants spinoff Kamp Koral and The SpongeBob Movie: Sponge on the Run debuting on the service that same day. Throughout 2021, Paramount+ would announce and debut new programming based on Nickelodeon IP, including a live-action sequel series to The Fairly OddParents that premiered in March 2022, a CGI-animated reboot of Rugrats, and an iCarly sequel series. As of 2024, much of Nickelodeon's series library is streaming on Paramount+.

In 2021, CBS Sports began producing alternate broadcasts of selected National Football League (NFL) games for Nickelodeon as NFL on Nickelodeon, which are oriented towards children and family viewing, and incorporate Nickelodeon-inspired augmented reality effects. These broadcasts began with a wild card game for the 2020–21 playoffs, whose conventional telecast aired on CBS. The telecast was praised for its style, as well as its efforts to explain the rules of football to first-time viewers. Nickelodeon would subsequently figure prominently in CBS' own coverage of Super Bowl LV later that year, with special programming and content pertaining to the game. CBS would begin co-producing additional NFL content for Nickelodeon in subsequent seasons, including the weekly magazine show NFL Slimetime (hosted by CBS Sports' Nate Burleson and Dylan Gilmer from Tyler Perry's Young Dylan), another wild card game in the 2021–22 playoffs, and a Christmas Day game in December 2022. In August 2023, CBS announced that Nickelodeon would air a youth-oriented broadcast of Super Bowl LVIII in 2024, marking the first alternate telecast in Super Bowl history.

== 2023–present: Return of the splat ==
Alternative version of the 2023 logo

Short version of the 2023 logo

On March 4, 2023, coinciding with its broadcast of the 2023 Kids' Choice Awards, Nickelodeon introduced an updated logo and imaging campaign developed by design agency Roger and advertising agency Callen; an official tagline, "We Make Fun", was unveiled later in May. The new logo superimposes the 2009 wordmark over a modernized iteration of Nickelodeon's historic "splat" imagery, taking advantage of the channel's continued brand equity among older viewers (i.e. parents watching Nickelodeon together with their children). Pink and purple colors were also incorporated into the branding's color scheme, accompanying Nickelodeon's traditional use of orange. The first animated show to premiere under the 2023 brand was Nick Jr.'s Bossy Bear, while the last animated show to premiere under its 2009 brand was Nicktoons and Hasbro's Transformers: EarthSpark.

In 2024, the first Noggin streaming service was discontinued and its programming was moved to Paramount+. In 2025, Noggin became independent from Paramount after its second revival as a beta streaming service.

In April 2026, Paramount Skydance announced that Nickelodeon Animation Studio would no longer operate as a separate entity and would become the kids and family animation label of CBS Studios, which is also owner of sister studio CBS Eye Animation Productions.

In October 2026, Paramount Skydance completed its acquisition of Warner Bros. Discovery under the name Skydance, bringing Nickelodeon under common ownership with long-time rival Cartoon Network.

In November 2026, Skydance announced that Nickelodeon Animation Studios would operate in the newly created Skydance Television Animation unit alongside sister studios Warner Bros. Animation, Cartoon Network Studios, Williams Street and Hanna-Barbera Studios Europe. Cartoon Network and Adult Swim president Michael Ouweleen would be promoted as the president of the combined division with Peter Girardi and Alec Botnick overseeing content across all four labels.

== Bibliography ==
- Denisoff, R. Serge (1988). Inside MTV. New Brunswick: Transaction Publishers. ISBN 978-0-8873-8173-7.
- Hendershot, Heather, ed. (2004). Nickelodeon Nation: The History, Politics, and Economics of America's Only TV Channel for Kids. New York: New York University Press. ISBN 0-8147-3652-1.
- Klickstein, Mathew (2013). SLIMED! An Oral History of Nickelodeon's Golden Age. New York: Plume. ISBN 978-0-1421-9685-4.
