= The Skulls II =

- DVD cover
- Directed by: Joe Chappelle
- Written by: Hans Rodionoff; Michele Colucci-Zieger
- Based on: The Skulls by John Pogue
- Produced by: Neal H. Moritz; John Pogue
- Starring: Robin Dunne; Nathan West; Ashley Lyn Cafagna; Lindy Booth; Christopher Ralph
- Cinematography: Steve Danyluk
- Edited by: Stephen Lawrence
- Music by: Christophe Beck
- Production company: Original Film
- Distributed by: Universal Studios Home Video
- Release date: April 9, 2002
- Running time: 99 minutes
- Country: United States
- Language: English

The Skulls II is a 2002 thriller film directed by Joe Chappelle and starring Robin Dunne, Nathan West, Ashley Lyn Cafagna, Lindy Booth and Christopher Ralph. A sequel to the 2000 film The Skulls, it was released direct-to-video by Universal Studios Home Video on April 9, 2002.

The film was followed by a sequel The Skulls III (2004).

== Plot ==
Several years after the first film, Ryan Sommers is a student at an unnamed university, believed to be Yale University by the sports teams logo and various New Haven, Connecticut imagery seen throughout the film. He and lacrosse teammate, Jeff, are tapped for the elite "Skulls" society. Despite his friend Jeff's zeal for being tapped, Ryan is ambivalent toward admission into the Skulls, seeing it as a form of control from his older brother, Greg (who is a member), and its distraction from his beautiful, socialite girlfriend, Ali.

Soon after being tapped, Ryan (having received inside information from his older brother Greg) stages an accident during one of the Skulls' secret initiation rituals by faking that he has been accidentally stabbed, only to reveal that it was a sophomoric joke. Not amused, the senior leadership, led by Parker Neal, decide to punish Ryan and Jeff by making them clean the attic of the Skulls tomb. While cleaning the attic that night, both Ryan and Jeff hear someone on the roof, only to discover it is fellow Skulls member Matt "Hutch" Hutchison and field hockey team captain Diana Rollins. While peeping on Hutchison and Rollins as she begins to disrobe, Ryan notices her drinking from a flask that Hutchison gave her. Soon thereafter, she starts to become dizzy and then falls off the roof of the Skulls tomb. Trying to alert the other members in the tomb, Ryan is told that nothing is wrong and he must have been seeing things.

Ryan later goes to his brother Greg about the incident, believing that the Skulls have covered up Diana Rollins' death. Greg agrees to give Ryan a key to the tomb, so that he can investigate further, but this later turns out to be a ploy in order to lure Ryan there. Ryan is told the supposed truth about what was really taking place. He is fed a story by Parker Neal that, due to Ryan's sophomoric joke during the initiation ritual, the Skulls staged Diana Rollins falling off the roof as they had staged (years earlier) the death of a former member's roommate when he too was not taking membership seriously. This was all a test to see if Ryan would remain loyal to the Order by not going to the authorities. The former member's roommate story is a direct reference to the first film, in which Will Beckford, Lucas McNamara's roommate, was killed by a member of the society after barely surviving a head-first fall while being chased by Skull member Caleb Mandrake. Not convinced by this ruse, Ryan begins to do research, and later discovers from Beckford's parents that their son was killed by the Skulls for doing an exposé on the secret society and breaking into the tomb. The parents had been settling a lawsuit with some school's Skull aligned alumni, but stopped due to being unable to afford good attorney to represent.

That evening, Ryan receives a phone call from his brother Greg that Diana Rollins was killed in a car accident while returning from a supposed ski trip in New Hampshire. At this point, Ryan knows the entire scandal has been a cover-up to protect Matt Hutchison and the Skulls from public humiliation. Due to his digging around, the Skulls turn Ryan's life into chaos. His brother Greg is fired from his high-level position as an attorney at Skull member Winston Taft's firm, Ryan's girlfriend Ali accuses him of assaulting her, and he is pursued by the Skulls at every avenue. Through his friendship with Ali's roommate, Kelly, he later discovers that his apartment is bugged, and the Skulls will stop at nothing to cover up Diana Rollins' accidental death, even attempting to run him and Kelly down in the streets of New Haven.

Ryan and Kelly believe that the only true way to expose the Skulls is by getting their hands on the coroner's report, showing that Diana Rollins did indeed have drugs and alcohol in her system, and that she had been dead for days, not hours. Ryan's brother, Greg, uses his acquaintance, county coroner Dr. Phillip Sprague, to gain inside information — Sprague was offered a prostitute by the Skulls to switch the coroner's reports. However Dr. Sprague secretly was able to keep a copy of the original coroner's report as an insurance policy. Later, Kelly posing as a medical student to get Sprague away from his office, Ryan steals the real report and hands it over to Greg and Kelly before being arrested for breaking and entering. In the meantime Parker, Matt and Ali (whose right eye was kneed by Ryan by accident while tickling him in bed days earlier) decide to press assault charges against Ryan, in an effort to keep him from delving further into Diana's death, but Jeff has already come forward stating the Skulls covered up Diana Rollins' death and that Matt Hutchison was responsible, with the original coroner's report as evidence. Hutchison is taken into custody; Parker narrowly escaping arrest himself, while Ali was not arrested.

With Matt Hutchinson's arrest, Greg becomes the Beckford's new attorney for settling in court and Ali admits to Ryan and Kelly she willingly aided the Skulls for increasing her status if Ryan had not poked around and the Skulls will give her what she wants if she helps set up Ryan. Back at the Skulls tomb, Skulls chairman senator George Milford states that shame and disgrace has been brought to the Order by this scandal. Believing that Ryan will be expelled from the Order, Parker egotistically states that he believes casting out Ryan is a smart move, only to discover that he is the one being expelled. Parker is seized by members of the Order and his brand of membership is removed from his wrist as he screams out in pain. Ryan casts himself out of the Order. The final scene shows him and Kelly kissing in her car as they begin a new life together.

== Cast ==
- Robin Dunne as Ryan Sommers
- Nathan West as Parker Neal
- Ashley Lyn Cafagna as Ali
- Lindy Booth as Kelly
- James Gallanders as Greg Sommers
- Christopher Ralph as Jeff Colby
- Aaron Ashmore as Matt Hutchinson
- Andrew Gillies as Winston Taft
- Stephen Young as Sen. George Milford
- Simon Reynolds as Dr. Phillip Sprague
- Ardon Bess as Mr. Beckford
- Sandi Ross as Mrs. Beckford
- Margot Gagnon as Diana Rollins

== Production ==
The film was based on a spec script by Hans Rodionoff and Michele Colucci titled "Dire Pledge", which Rodionoff had described as "Rear Window" set in a fraternity house.
