= Nickelodeon Saturday programming block =

Former programming block on Nickelodeon

- Network: Nickelodeon
- Launched: September 22, 2012; 13 years ago
- Closed: November 20, 2021; 4 years ago
- Country of origin: United States
- Owner: Viacom Media Networks (Viacom)
- Formerly known as: Saturday nights: Gotta See Saturdays (2012–2013); Nick's New Saturday Night (2014); Nick's Saturday Night (2015–2017); A Night of Premieres (2018–2021); Saturday mornings: Morning of Premieres (2012–2013); The Saturday Morning Hang Zone with Lincoln Loud (2017); Do the New Saturday Mornings (2017)
- Format: Children/teen/young adult block
- Running time: Saturday mornings: 10:00 a.m.–12:30 p.m. ET (2 1/2 hours; Fall 2012 – December 2017); 8:00 a.m.–9:00 a.m. ET (1 hour; Summer 2016 – December 2017); Saturday nights: 8:00 p.m.–9:30 p.m. ET (1 1/2 hours; Fall 2012 – November 2021)

The Nickelodeon Saturday programming block (known as Gotta See Saturdays from 2012 to 2013, Nick's New Saturday Night from 2014, Nick's Saturday Night from 2015 to 2017 and A Night of Premieres from 2018 to 2021) was the programming block for Nickelodeon's Saturday morning and Saturday night programming on its flagship channel in the United States from 2012 to 2021. The morning block (airing from 10:00 a.m.-12:30 p.m ET/PT) mainly featured new premieres of Nicktoons programming, while the evening block (from 7:30 p.m.-10:00 p.m ET/PT) consisted of the network's original live-action sitcoms. The block launched on September 22, 2012, with season premieres of the respective series in both dayparts. Gotta See Saturdays, the original name for its Saturday night block, was a direct successor to the former Saturday night blocks SNICK (1992–2005) and TEENick (2001–2009).

From February 25 to March 23, 2017, Nickelodeon promoted its Saturday morning block as The Saturday Morning Hang Zone with Lincoln Loud, which was themed after The Loud House. On March 31, 2018, the branding for the Saturday night block became known as A Night of Premieres, with the premiere of the original series Star Falls, alongside new episodes of Knight Squad and Henry Danger.

In late 2020, Nickelodeon moved premiere episodes of its animated series from Saturday mornings to Friday nights. The block was fully discontinued on November 20, 2021, with Nickelodeon moving its live-action comedy premieres to Thursday nights starting on January 6, 2022, marking the first time since 1992 that Nickelodeon did not air new episodes on a Saturday programming block.

== Programming ==
=== Final programming ===
==== Live-action series ====
- Tyler Perry's Young Dylan (February 29, 2020 – August 21, 2021)
- Danger Force (March 28, 2020 – November 20, 2021)
- Side Hustle (November 7, 2020 – November 20, 2021)
- Power Rangers Dino Fury (February 20, 2021 – November 20, 2021)

=== Former programming ===
==== Animated series ====
- SpongeBob SquarePants (September 22, 2012 – 2020)
- The Penguins of Madagascar (September 22, 2012 – November 10, 2012)
- T.U.F.F. Puppy (September 22, 2012 – 2012)
- Kung Fu Panda: Legends of Awesomeness (September 22, 2012 – June 29, 2014)
- Robot and Monster (September 22, 2012 – December 8, 2012)
- Teenage Mutant Ninja Turtles (September 29, 2012 – November 12, 2017)
- The Fairly OddParents (March 23, 2013 – March 28, 2015)
- Monsters vs. Aliens (March 23, 2013 – February 8, 2014)
- Sanjay and Craig (May 25, 2013 – July 25, 2015)
- Rabbids Invasion (August 3, 2013 – February 7, 2016)
- Breadwinners (February 17, 2014 – December 11, 2015)
- Harvey Beaks (March 28 – July 25, 2015; October 15, 2016)
- Pig Goat Banana Cricket (July 18 – August 8, 2015)
- The Loud House (October 15, 2016; November 11, 2017; 2019 – May 23, 2020)
- Bunsen Is a Beast (2017)
- Rise of the Teenage Mutant Ninja Turtles (September 22, 2018 – October 13, 2019)
- The Casagrandes (October 19, 2019 – May 30, 2020)
- It's Pony (January 18 – December 4, 2020)

==== Live-action series ====
- iCarly (2012)
- Big Time Rush (2012–2013)
- Victorious (2012–2013)
- Power Rangers Samurai (2012)
- How to Rock (2012-2013)
- Marvin Marvin (2012–2013)
- Supah Ninjas (2013)
- Power Rangers Megaforce (2013–2014)
- Wendell & Vinnie (2013)
- Sam & Cat (2013–2014)
- AwesomenessTV (2013–2015)
- The Haunted Hathaways (2013–2015)
- The Thundermans (2013–2018)
- Henry Danger (2014–2020)
- Nicky, Ricky, Dicky & Dawn (2014–2018)
- 100 Things to Do Before High School (2014–2016)
- Bella and the Bulldogs (2015–2016)
- Power Rangers Dino Charge (2015–2016)
- Game Shakers (2015–2019)
- School of Rock (2016–2018)
- Legendary Dudas (2016)
- Power Rangers Ninja Steel (2017–2018)
- Knight Squad (2018–2019)
- Star Falls (2018)
- Cousins for Life (2018–2019)
- Power Rangers Beast Morphers (2019–2020)
- All That (2019–2020)
- Group Chat (2020)
- Nickelodeon's Unfiltered (2020–2021)
- Tooned In (March 6, 2021)
- Drama Club (2021)

=== Acquired programming ===
- NFL Rush Zone (February 2, 2013)
- Digimon Fusion (September 7, 2013 – October 5, 2013)
- TeenNick Top 10 (August 16, 2014 – November 22, 2014)
- Alvinnn!!! and the Chipmunks (2015; 2017)
- Miraculous: Tales of Ladybug & Cat Noir (August 13, 2016 – October 22, 2016)
- Regal Academy (August 13, 2016 – April 29, 2017)
- Kuu Kuu Harajuku (October 8, 2016 – March 4, 2017)
- Lego City Adventures (June 22, 2019 – 2020)
- Lego Jurassic World: Legend of Isla Nublar (September 14, 2019 – 2020)

== See also ==
- SNICK
- TEENick
