= Christopher Ralph =

Canadian actor (born 1977)

- Born: Christopher Douglas Ralph; May 13, 1977 (age 49); St. John's, Newfoundland and Labrador, Canada
- Education: Memorial University of Newfoundland
- Years active: 1998–present

Christopher Douglas Ralph (born May 13, 1977) is a Canadian actor. He is perhaps best known for his role as Tobias in the television series Animorphs.

== Early life ==
Ralph was born in St John's, Newfoundland and Labrador to Sandra and Douglas Ralph.

== Filmography ==
=== Film ===
Year	Title	Role	Notes
2000	Gossip	Bill	
2002	The Skulls II	Jeff Colby	Video

=== Television ===
Year	Title	Role	Notes
1998–99	Animorphs	Tobias	Main role
2000	Hendrix	Mitch Mitchell	TV film
2000	Monster by Mistake	Wesley Whiffington III (voice)	Recurring role
2000	The Royal Diaries: Isabel - Jewel of Castilla	Fernando	TV film
2000–01	In a Heartbeat	Jamie Waite	Main role
2001–02	Our Hero	Malachi	Supporting role
2002	Undressed	Sean	TV series (season 6)
2002	The Zack Files	Romeo	Episode: "Zackeo and Juliet"
2002	Doc	Barista	Episode: "Second Time Around"
2003	Queer as Folk	Cute Fan	Episodes: "One Ring to Rule Them All", "Stop Hurting Us"
2003	Sue Thomas: F.B.Eye	Billy Marshall	Episode: "Billy the Kid"
2003	Thoughtcrimes	Ryan	TV film
2003–04	Missing	Hunter	Recurring role (season 1)
2004	Plain Truth	Adam Sinclair	TV film
2005	Slam Dunk	Kiminobu Kogure (voice)	
2005	Kojak	Eddie Carney	Episode: "Music of the Night"
2005	Shania: A Life in Eight Albums	Mike	TV film
2005–06	Instant Star	Chaz Blackburn	Episodes: "All Apologies", "Viciousness"
2010	Murdoch Mysteries	Burt Lightman	Episode: "This One Goes to Eleven"
2010	Republic of Doyle	Bruce Borden	Episode: "The Pen Is Mightier Than the Doyle"
2011	Rookie Blue	Billy	Episode: "Butterflies"
2011	Warehouse 13	Cpl. Brewer	Episode: "Queen for a Day"
2011	MetaJets	Bryce (voice)	Episode: "City of Flight"
2013	Lost Girl	Mr. Johnson	Episode: "Getting to Know You: The Una Mens"
2023	Up Here	'What If' Dancer	Episode: "Lindsay"
