= Eric Hester =

American composer (born 1974)

- Born: Eric John Michael Hester; January 9, 1974 (age 52); Las Vegas, Nevada, USA
- Origin: Los Angeles, California
- Genres: film score
- Occupations: Composer, Songwriter, Arranger
- Years active: 1992 – present
- Website: http://www.hestermusic.com

Eric John Michael Hester (born January 9, 1974) is an American composer.

== Early life and family ==
Eric Hester was born on January 9, 1974, in Las Vegas, Nevada. In 1979, he moved with his family to Newport Beach, California. In 1988, he moved to San Clemente where he attended San Clemente High School and studied with composer and songwriter, Mike Bacich, of Oingo Boingo. In 1992, Hester moved to Los Angeles, where he attended the University of California, Los Angeles extension program.

Hester's first composing work came on Roundhouse, on Nickelodeon, which he was nominated for the CableACE Award in 1995 for the song, "Second Chance".

=== Album Producer ===
Hester was a contributing producer on the Britney Spears song "Follow Me" (also the theme to Nickelodeon's Zoey 101). He also was the string arranger on the track.

=== Film and television scores ===
The following list consists of select films and television shows for which Eric Hester wrote the score and/or songs.

==== 1990s ====
- Roundhouse (1992–1995)
- Barnyard Buddies (1996)
- Turmoil (1997)
- Cheap Theatrix (1998)
- Violent Times (1997)
- Rained In (1998)
- Sworn to Secrecy: Secrets of War (1998)
- Compassion (1999)
- The Pretender (1998–2000)

==== 2000s ====
- Voyeur.com a.k.a. BigBrother.com (UK) (2000)
- The Fountain (2001)
- My First Day (1991)
- Nash Bridges (2000)
- Mr. Chi Chi's Guide to the Universe (2000–2001)
- Future Murder (2000)
- Three Blind Mice a.k.a. Ed McBain's Three Blind Mice (USA: complete title) (2001)
- Altered Species (2001)
- Flatland (2002)
- VH1 Big in 2002 Awards (2002)
- Revelation (2002)
- The Monkey's Paw (2003)
- The Utopian Society (2003)
- Knee High P.I. (additional music) (2003)
- American Almanacs: A Living History (2003)
- Bollywood and Vine (2004)
- Pizza: The Movie (2004)
- Marcus Apple (2004)
- Jack (2004)
- A Soft Embrace (2004)
- Client 3815 (2004)
- A Night at Sophie's (2004)
- Rodney (2004–2006)
- The Swap (2005)
- 20 Things to Do Before You're 30 (USA) (2005)
- Ana (2005)
- Zoey 101 (2005–2007)
- Lost Mission (2006)
- Making the Cut (2006)
- Waiting (2007)
- An Excellent Choice (2007)
- Sympathy (2007)
- Women On Top (2007)
- Snowball (2007)
- The Flower Girl (2008)
- Peter Rabbit (2008)
- Frail (in production) (2009)

=== Concertos ===
- Cape Cod Recessional (2000)
- A Hymn To A New Season (2001)
- 911: Triumphant Spirit (2003)

== Discography ==
- Snowball Original Motion Picture Soundtrack, 2008
- Lost Mission Original Motion Picture Soundtrack, 2007
- Zoey 101: Music Mix CD, 2007 "Follow Me" by Britney Spears Production and String Arrangement by Eric Hester
- Shorts: Volume 1, 2006
- My First Day, 2005
