= Boris Cabrera =

American actor

- Born: Boris Alberto Cabrera; December 16, 1980 (age 45); Inglewood, California, U.S.
- Education: Morningside High School
- Occupation: Actor
- Years active: 1994–2004

Boris Alberto Cabrera (born December 16, 1980, in Inglewood, California), is an American former actor. Cabrera is primarily known as originating the role of Marco in the live-adaptation television series of the long-running book series Animorphs. He left the entertainment industry in the early 2000s and became a personal fitness trainer. He also attended Morningside High School in Inglewood, California.

== Filmography ==
Film
| Year | Title | Role | Notes |
|---|---|---|---|
| 1994 | Flashfire | Esteban | |
| 2001 | She's No Angel | Daniel | TV movie |
| 2001 | Social Misfits | Oscar | |
| 2004 | East L.A. King | Jose | |

Television
| Year | Title | Role | Notes |
|---|---|---|---|
| 1995 | ER | Rico | 1 episode |
| 1997 | Pacific Blue | Billy Guerrero | 1 episode |
| 1995–1998 | Walker, Texas Ranger | Tommy Lopez | 2 episodes |
| 2000 | NYPD Blue | Actor | 1 episode |
| 1998–1999 | Animorphs | Marco | Main cast member |
| 2001 | Everybody Loves Raymond | Ron Fernandez | 1 episode |
| 2001 | The Nightmare Room | Gomez | 1 episode |
