= Roundhouse (TV series) =

American television series

- Created by: Buddy Sheffield; Rita Sheffield Hester
- Developed by: Rita Sheffield Hester; Buddy Sheffield; Benny Hester
- Written by: Bernie Ancheta; Becky Hartman-Edwards; Sheila R. Lawrence; Nancy Neufeld Callaway; Buddy Sheffield; Rita Sheffield
- Directed by: Rita Sheffield; Ron Andreassen; Bruce Gowers; Gary Halvorson; Paul Hoen; Linda Mendoza; Dennis Rosenblatt
- Theme music composer: Benny Hester; Buddy Sheffield
- Composers: Benny Hester; Eric Hester; Frank Musker; James Raymond; Marty Walsh
- Country of origin: United States
- Original language: English
- No. of seasons: 4
- No. of episodes: 52

Production
- Executive producers: Rita Sheffield Hester; Buddy Sheffield; Benny Hester
- Production locations: Nickelodeon Studios (season 1); CBS Studio Center (seasons 2-4)
- Running time: 22–24 minutes
- Production company: Rebel Entertainment

Original release
- Network: Nickelodeon
- Release: August 15, 1992 – February 26, 1995

Roundhouse is an American comedy-variety television series that aired on Nickelodeon from 1992 through 1995. The series was recorded before a live audience on a minimal set and incorporated sketch comedy, dance sequences, and musical performances.

== Background ==
Roundhouse debuted as a part of the original SNICK lineup on Nickelodeon in 1992 and continued airing on the network through the end of 1995.

Each episode revolved around the Anyfamily family and their problems in daily life. The half-hour show, taped in front of a visible live audience, was broken up into sketches, dance sequences, and musical performances by both cast members and the house band. After the storylines were resolved, a cast member would say, "Reprise the theme song and roll the credits!" The cast would then perform a dance routine while singing the opening theme a cappella as the credits ran. On the final episode, the entire cast shouted the line.

== Cast ==
- Bryan Anthony (Season 4)
- Alfred Carr Jr.
- Jennifer Cihi (Season 3)
- John Crane
- Mark David
- Shawn Daywalt
- Ivan Dudynsky
- Micki Duran
- Amy Ehrlich (Season 3)
- Seymour Willis Green
- Crystal Lewis (Season 1)
- Dominic Lucero (Seasons 1–4)
- Shawn Muñoz (Season 3)
- David Nicoll (Season 4)
- Natalie Nucci
- Natasha Pearce (Season 4)
- Julene Renee-Preciado (as "Julene Renee")
- David Sidoni
- Lisa Vale (Seasons 2 and 4)

== Roundhouse band ==
- Jack Kelly – drums
- John Pena – bass guitar
- James Raymond – keyboards
- Marty Walsh – guitar
- Will MacGregor – bass guitar (season 3)
- Abe Laboriel Jr. – drums (season 4)
- Tom Lilly – bass guitar (season 4)
- Oskar Cartaya – bass guitar (season 4)

== Episodes ==
=== Season 1 (1992) ===
1. You Can’t Fire Your Family
2. New Kid in Town
3. Last One Picked
4. School Daze
5. First Date
6. Crushes/Idealism
7. TV on Trial
8. Meat Market
9. The Clock Strikes Back
10. Conflict
11. Lifestyles
12. The School Play
13. What If?

=== Season 2 (1993) ===
1. The Game of Popularity
2. Environment
3. Pets
4. Step Family Feud
5. In Trouble
6. Independence
7. Fears
8. Best Friends
9. And Baby Makes Three
10. Summertime Blues
11. Technobabble

=== Season 3 (1994) ===
1. Happy Holidays
2. Women vs. Men
3. Gang Violence
4. Jealousy
5. Talent
6. Rock Stars
7. Greed
8. Prejudice
9. Generation Gap
10. Puberty
11. Privacy
12. Self-Esteem
13. The Joke's on You
14. Running Away
15. Lies

=== Season 4 (1995) ===
1. The Big Quake
2. Summer Camp
3. Change
4. Nobody's Perfect (Live Episode)
5. Dropout
6. The History of the Anyfamily - Part 1
7. The History of the Anyfamily - Part 2
8. Justice
9. Superstitions
10. Stress and Success
11. Obsession
12. War & Peace
13. Endings

== Awards and nominations ==
Year	Result	Award	Category	Recipient
1993	Won	Young Artist Awards	Outstanding Young Ensemble Cast in a Youth Series or Variety Show	Cast
1994	Nominated	Young Artist Awards	Outstanding Youth Ensemble in a Cable or Off Primetime Series	Cast
1993	Won	CableACE Award	Original Song ("I Can Dream")	Benny Hester and Buddy Sheffield
1995	Nominated	CableACE Award	Original Song ("Second Chance")	Eric Hester
1994	Won	Ollie Award	Excellence in Television Programming for America's Children - American Center for Children's Television –	Roundhouse Producers –

== Home media ==
To date, two episodes have been released on VHS.

Episode	VHS title
"New Kid in Town"	SNICK: Volume 1: Nick SNICKS Friendship
"You Can't Fire Your Family"	SNICK: Volume 2: Nick SNICKS The Family
