= Animorphs (TV series) =

Television series

- Genre: Science fantasy; Teen drama; Suspense
- Created by: K. A. Applegate (book series)
- Starring: Shawn Ashmore; Boris Cabrera; Nadia Nascimento; Brooke Nevin; Christopher Ralph
- Theme music composer: Craig Hazen; Julie Dansky; David Wolfert
- Opening theme: "It's All in Your Hands"; "It's All in Your Hands" (instrumental; later episodes)
- Ending theme: "It's All in Your Hands" (instrumental; episode 3 onwards)
- Composer: Norman Orenstein
- Countries of origin: Canada; United States
- Original language: English
- No. of seasons: 2
- No. of episodes: 26

Production
- Executive producers: Deborah A. Forte; Bill Siegler
- Production locations: Toronto, Ontario, Canada
- Running time: 22–23 minutes per episode
- Production companies: Protocol Entertainment; Scholastic Productions

Original release
- Network: Nickelodeon (United States); YTV (Canada); Global (Canada)
- Release: September 4, 1998 – March 26, 2000

Animorphs (also known under the promotional title AniTV) is a television adaptation made by Protocol Entertainment based on the Scholastic book series of the same name by K. A. Applegate. It originally aired on Nickelodeon in the United States from September 4, 1998 to March 26, 2000, and on YTV and Global in Canada.

The series ran for a total of 26 episodes across two seasons and is currently distributed by 9 Story Media Group.

== Plot ==
The series revolves around five teenagers, Jake, Marco, Cassie, Rachel, and Tobias, and one alien, Aximili-Esgarrouth-Isthill (nicknamed "Ax"), who obtain the ability to transform into any animal they touch. Naming themselves as "Animorphs" (a portmanteau of "animal morphers"), they use their ability to battle a secret alien infiltration of Earth by a parasitic clan of aliens resembling large slugs, called Yeerks, that take humans as a host by entering and merging with their brain through the ear canal. The Animorphs fight as a guerilla force against the Yeerks, led by Visser Three.

The Animorphs carefully protect their identities; the Yeerks assume that they're an Andalite strike force, the aliens that created the transformation technology, and to protect their families from Yeerk reprisals, the Animorphs keep up the façade. Over the series' run, the pretense becomes harder to maintain; the Yeerks grow more cautious and dedicate more time and resources to capturing the 'Andalite bandits'.

Though the Animorphs can assume the form of any animal they touch, there are several limitations to the ability: they can only stay in animal form for two hours, or they will not being able to return to human form. Also, the process requires some level of concentration to prevent the animal's natural instincts from overpowering the human intellect.

== Cast and characters ==
=== Main ===
- Shawn Ashmore as Jake
- Brooke Nevin as Rachel
- Boris Cabrera as Marco
- Nadia Nascimento as Cassie
- Christopher Ralph as Tobias
- Paulo Costanzo as Aximili "Ax" Esgarrouth-Isthill/Max

=== Recurring ===
- Eugene Lipinski as Visser Three/Victor Trent
- Dov Tiefenbach as Erek King
- Allegra Fulton as Visser One/Eva
- Joshua Peace as Tom, Jake's older brother
- Terra Vanessa Kowalyk as Melissa Chapman
- Richard Sali as Principal Chapman
- Diego Matamoros as Elfangor Sirinial-Shamtul
- Peter Messaline as The Ellimist
- Frank Pellegrino as Jeremy, Marco's father (Peter in the books)
- Cassandra Van Wyck as Sara, Rachel's younger sister
- Jonathan Whittaker as Greg, Jake's father (Steve in the books)
- Karen Waddell as Nikki, Jake's mother (Jean in the books)
- Melanie Nicholls-King as Aisha, Cassie's mother (Michelle in the books)

== Episodes ==
=== Series overview ===
Season	Episodes	Originally released	
Season	Episodes	First released	Last released
1	20	September 4, 1998	February 16, 1999
2	6	September 3, 1999	October 1, 1999

=== Season 1 (1998–1999) ===
No. overall	No. in season	Title	Directed by	Written by	Original release date	Original US air date	Prod. code
1	1	"My Name is Jake, Part 1"	Timothy Bond	Neal Shusterman & Jeff Vlaming	September 4, 1998	September 4, 1998	1X1
Jake, Rachel, Tobias, Cassie and Marco, five teenagers who know each other only tangentially (Jake and Rachel are cousins, Marco and Cassie are their respective best friends, and Jake once rescued Tobias from bullies), chase after Jake's dog Homer into an abandoned construction site and wind up encountering an alien named Elfangor, an Andalite warrior prince who offers them the power to morph into animals to save the Earth from an insidious secret invasion by slug-like body-controlling parasitic aliens called Yeerks. Based on The Invasion. Narrated by Jake.
2	2	"My Name is Jake, Part 2"	Timothy Bond	Neal Shusterman, Dan Angel & Billy Brown	September 11, 1998	September 11, 1998	1X2
After witnessing Prince Elfangor's death at the hands of Yeerk leader Visser Three, Jake and his friends must decide how to make use of their newfound power to outsmart and fight back against the Yeerks, an alien race that have parasitically begun taking over humans. Based on The Invasion. Narrated by Jake.
3	3	"Underground"	Ron Oliver	Neal Shusterman & Jeff Vlaming	September 18, 1998	September 18, 1998	1X6
The group begin acquiring morphs from the zoo where Cassie's mother works in their first attempt to confront the Yeerks. Rachel acquires the lion morph and Jake acquires the white tiger morph. Meanwhile, Jake discovers his older brother Tom has become a Controller—a human who has become a host for a Yeerk, through a group known as The Sharing. Their assault is a failure; they don't free any humans and apparently lose both Tobias and the mysterious disc that Elfangor entrusted to him. Based on The Invasion. Narrated by Marco.
4	4	"On the Run"	Ron Oliver	Scott Peters	September 25, 1998	September 25, 1998	1X3
When the Yeerks offer to exchange the Andalite disc for an Andalite, Jake and Marco come up with a risky plan to get a Controller to capture an animal instead. Meanwhile, Cassie and Rachel attend a Sharing meeting to find out more about the Yeerks and what may have happened to Tobias. This episode is not based on any book in particular, but follows a few plot lines of The Invasion (investigating a Sharing meeting), The Visitor (finding out the original entrance to the pool is gone) and The Predator (Yeerks finding Animorphs by following a fake signal, as well as Animorphs being chased through a mall). Narrated by Jake.
5	5	"Between Friends"	Shawn Levy	Ron Oliver	October 2, 1998	October 2, 1998	1X4
Now that it's certain that Tobias is trapped in his hawk morph, Rachel attempts to rescue her friend, Melissa Chapman, from infestation. Melissa's father, Principal Chapman, is an important Controller and Rachel in her cat morph is captured and taken to Visser Three. Jake in his Golden Retriever morph and the other Animorphs must rescue her and avoid recklessly endangering themselves. Based on The Visitor and one plot line of The Invasion (an Animorph finding out at night that Tobias is stuck in his hawk morph). Narrated by Rachel.
6	6	"The Message"	William Fruet	Marc Scott Zicree & Neal Shusterman	October 9, 1998	October 9, 1998	1X5
Cassie and Tobias suspect another Andalite is on Earth when a distressed thought-speak voice is heard by them and Visser Three. It soon becomes a race between the Animorphs and the Yeerks to claim the Andalite, a teenage warrior cadet named Aximili-Esgarrouth-Isthill (Ax) who is Elfangor's younger brother. Based on The Message. Narrated by Cassie.
7	7	"The Escape"	Ron Oliver	Jessica Scott & Mike Wollaeger	October 16, 1998	October 16, 1998	1X9
The Animorphs discover that a certain type of oatmeal is a stimulant to the Yeerks, and leaves them unable to control their hosts' actions. The usage of this "drug" also affects the hosts, but the Animorphs know they must use this advantage to inflict some serious damage upon the Yeerk pool. Based on The Underground. Narrated by Rachel.
8	8	"The Alien"	Don McCutcheon	Marc Scott Zicree	October 23, 1998	October 23, 1998	1X10
Ax, feeling foreign to his new surroundings, tries to fit in with his new friends in his human identity as "Max". After making the grave mistake of giving technology to humans, he must fix his error by Andalite law and defeat Visser Three — alone. Based on The Alien. Narrated by Ax.
9	9	"The Capture, Part 1"	William Fruet	Neal Shusterman	November 3, 1998	January 10, 1999	1X7
Jake discovers Victor Trent, his father's business partner in opening a new health clinic, is actually Visser Three. When the Animorphs go to destroy the Yeerk pool in the building, Jake falls into the pool and unknown to his friends, becomes a Controller. Based on The Capture. Narrated by Jake.
10	10	"The Capture, Part 2"	William Fruet	Neal Shusterman & Marc Scott Zicree	November 10, 1998	January 10, 1999	1X8
Ax realizes that after falling into the Yeerk pool they destroyed, Jake has become a Controller; the group must prevent Jake from using his morphing powers to escape and reveal the Animorphs to Visser Three. Jake and the Yeerk inside him struggle to maintain control of his body as the Animorphs attempt to kill the Yeerk by depriving it of the nourishing Kandrona rays it needs. Meanwhile Ax morphs into Jake so that his family and teachers won't realize he's missing and is coached on how to behave by Marco. Based on The Capture. Narrated by Ax.
11	11	"The Reaction"	Graeme Lynch	Carl Ellsworth	November 17, 1998	November 17, 1998	1X11
Cassie rescues a boy from a crocodile pit during a field trip at the zoo and develops an allergic reaction to the crocodile DNA she has acquired and cannot control her morphing abilities. When she is invited to a popular television show featuring star Jason Jon McCole as a guest, the Animorphs must find a way to stop him from encouraging millions of fans to join the Sharing. Based on The Reaction. Narrated by Cassie.
12	12	"The Stranger"	Don McCutcheon	Marc Scott Zicree	November 13, 1998	November 13, 1998	1X12
Rachel spends time with her father, struggling with whether she should move away with him or not. Meanwhile, Visser Three captures Ax and the rest of the Animorphs in a cunning trap until a mysterious figure with cosmic powers known as the Ellimist arrives and offers them a dangerous choice. Based on The Stranger. Narrated by Rachel.
13	13	"The Forgotten"	William Fruet	Scott Peters	November 20, 1998	November 20, 1998	1X15
Rachel suffers amnesia, which causes her to forget everything she knows, including everything about being an Animorph, and the battle against the Yeerks. When she unknowingly wanders into a human-Controller infested area and is about to be taken by the Yeerks, her friends must find a way to save her and restore her memory. Based on one plot line of Megamorphs: The Andalite's Gift (Rachel having amnesia). Narrated by Rachel.
14	14	"The Leader, Part 1"	Shawn Levy	Jessica Scott & Mike Wollaeger	January 5, 1999	February 7, 1999	1X13
Jake finds out Visser Three's superior Visser One will be at the EGS Tower, where the Yeerk Kandrona ray generator is located. When Jake and Marco are captured while spying on the Yeerks and brought on board their spaceship, their escape is hindered when they discover Visser One's host is Marco's presumed dead mother Eva. Based on The Stranger and The Predator. Narrated by Marco.
15	15	"The Leader, Part 2"	Shawn Levy	Jessica Scott & Mike Wollaeger	January 12, 1999	February 14, 1999	1X14
Now that Marco has found his mother again, he is reluctant to leave the Yeerk ship without her. Cassie and Rachel destroy the Kandrona ray generator while Ax must devise a way to bring Jake and Marco back to Earth. Meanwhile, their actions have revealed the existence of a new enemy. Based on The Stranger and The Predator. Narrated by Marco.
16	16	"Tobias"	Graeme Lynch	Carl Ellsworth	January 17, 1999	January 17, 1999	1X16
Ax creates a device that allows an individual to relive their most cherished memories, which Tobias and Ax use to relive their past days. Tobias relives his pre-Animorph life, remembering how he met Rachel, how he first acquired animal DNA, and how he decided to join the fight, while Ax remembers how awkward he was at first when he became human. Narrated by Tobias and Ax.
17	17	"Not My Problem"	Stacy Curtis	George Melrod	January 24, 1999	January 24, 1999	1X17
When Jake succumbs to the pressures of being the Animorphs' leader, the Ellimist appears and grants him the wish to be normal. However, in the alternate reality, everyone but Tobias is infested by the Yeerks and Tobias must carefully plot his next move to avoid the same fate. Shares similarities to Megamorphs: Back to Before, although the book came out after the episode. Narrated by Jake.
18	18	"The Release"	Robert K. Sprogis	Marc Scott Zicree & Carl Ellsworth	February 2, 1999	February 21, 1999	1X18
With too many Controllers and not enough Kandrona rays, Yeerks are dying and losing control of their hosts, including Tom, whom Jake and Marco try to rescue. Among the Controllers regaining their freedom include Jake's science teacher, Mr. Perkins, who has begun a crusade to free other Controllers. Based on one plot line of The Alien (Yeerks dying from lack of Kandrona rays). Narrated by Jake.
19	19	"Face Off, Part 1"	Graeme Lynch	Jessica Scott & Mike Wollaeger	February 9, 1999	March 26, 2000	1X19
At the basketball final, the Animorphs discover that all of their enemies will be in one place, giving them to opportunity to deal a blow to the Yeerks. However, a plan goes horribly wrong as Jake is trapped. The Animorphs must now split up to find the Andalite disc and free Jake. This episode is not based on any book in particular, but contains one plot line from The Change (Tobias regaining his human body as a morph with the hawk now his base form).
20	20	"Face Off, Part 2"	Graeme Lynch	Jessica Scott & Mike Wollaeger	February 16, 1999	March 26, 2000	1X20
Separated and surrounded by enemies, the Animorphs struggle to avoid being captured. Rachel manages to save Tobias by morphing into a Yeerk, but Jake remains in Tom's clutches as everyone else becomes dangerously close to being infested.

=== Season 2 (1999) ===
No. overall	No. in season	Title	Directed by	Written by	Original release date	Original US air date	Prod. code
21	1	"Face Off, Part 3"	Don McCutcheon	Rhonda Olson	September 3, 1999	March 26, 2000	2X1
With everyone in a desperate situation, Marco manages to save the day when he destroys a number of special Yeerks and creates a sufficient distraction for everyone else to escape. Jake almost gets caught after morphing into Tom to escape from Visser Three. Narrated by Jake.
22	2	"My Name is Erek"	Don McCutcheon	Jeff Schechter	September 10, 1999	February 20, 2000	2X2
Jake and Marco discover a bizarre child with superhuman strength, who they soon discover is Erek, a member of the android race known as the Chee. Erek and the Chee need the Animorphs' assistance to recover their hologram technology from the Yeerks. Based on The Android and one plot line from The Experiment (Ax becoming obsessed with television). Narrated by Marco.
23	3	"The Front"	Graeme Lynch	George Melrod	September 14, 1999	February 27, 2000	2X3
Ax lands a job at a new electronics store, where he is pressured to sell as many cell phones as possible. When Tom buys a cell phone for himself and his latest crush, Melissa Chapman, Jake and Marco become suspicious and investigate. However, they're horrified to discover what Ax is really selling. Narrated by Ax.
24	4	"Changes, Part 1"	Ron Oliver	Ron Oliver	September 17, 1999	February 20, 2000	2X4
The Animorphs decide that they've earned a break and plan to go to the spring dance. Cassie tries to urge Jake to help her stop a cosmetics factory's experiments with animals, but it ends up being a disaster. After the remaining Animorphs come to the rescue, Marco is caught on tape demorphing. This episode is not based on any book in particular, but contains a plot line from The Unknown (Animorphs investigating an alien object that turns out to be a toilet).
25	5	"Changes, Part 2"	Ron Oliver	Ron Oliver	September 24, 1999	February 20, 2000	2X5
The boy who taped Marco demorphing, Harold Nesbit, is about to reveal his finding for profit. Jake and Marco try to personally steal the tape, but are unsuccessful, so the group must find the tape and stop it from broadcasting. Meanwhile, Visser Three is using a TV executive morph to broadcast a new show that will make human infestation easier, and Ax is behaving strangely. This episode is not based on any book in particular, but contains a plot line from The Predator (Ax wanting to return to his homeworld).
26	6	"Changes, Part 3"	Ron Oliver	Ron Oliver	October 1, 1999	February 20, 2000	2X6
Tobias follows the trail of hawk images being left around town, but is shocked by what he finds. Meanwhile, when Marco notices a suspicious-looking construction worker hanging around school, he investigates and discovers that friends and the rest of their classmates are in huge danger. Before he can tell anyone, however, Marco finds himself trapped, unbeknownst to his friends, who are now arriving at the dance. After the crisis of the moment is resolved, the series ends with the Animorphs and other high schoolers having an impromptu spring dance at the arcade center, where Tobias dances with Rachel, Jake with Cassie, and Ax with Marco. This episode is not based on any book in particular, but contains a plot line from The Pretender (Tobias finding out Elfangor was his father). Narrated by Tobias.

== Production ==
The series was filmed in Toronto, Canada. Deborah A. Forte and Bill Siegler are the executive producers of the series. The animals used in this series were supplied by the Bowmanville Zoo, and Homer, the Golden Retriever who is Jake's dog, was trained by Bryan Renfro. Due to budget issues, and for practical, logistical, and safety reasons, the morphs of the characters from the books were changed with Jake having the white tiger morph, Tobias' morph being a Harris' hawk rather than a red-tailed hawk, and Rachel having the male lion morph as apposed to being the battle morph of James and David rather than an elephant and grizzly bear. Also, instead of Cassie, Marco has the wolf morph, rather than a gorilla, and the others were adapted out, such as marine animals, insects, and arachnids, because filming certain dangerous animal species are too expensive and couldn't be trained or handled during production, and limiting the number of morphs to cheaper and safer alternatives, such as smaller and domesticated animals, like cats, dogs, horses, llamas, ducks, rats, and ferrets, as well as to avoid the difficulties of filming underwater scenes.

== TV airings & media releases ==
Animorphs originally aired on Nickelodeon in the United States from September 4, 1998 to March 26, 2000, with reruns airing until August. Around 2015, reruns of the program were aired on over-the-air children's television network Qubo.

In Canada, the series aired on YTV for both seasons and Global for its second. The series also aired in Europe and Australia.

Sony Pictures Home Entertainment (then known as Columbia TriStar Home Video) had released twelve episodes in four VHS volumes, titled The Invasion Series, collecting episodes from the series.

- Part 1: The Invasion Begins ("My Name is Jake (parts 1-2)", and "Underground")
- Part 2: Nowhere to Run ("Between Friends", "The Message" and "The Reaction")
- Part 3: The Enemy Among Us ("The Stranger", and "The Leader (parts 1-2)")
- Part 4: The Legacy Survives ("The Capture (parts 1-2)", and "Not My Problem")

Seven volumes spanning the first 20 episodes (only the first of which was identical to its U.S. counterpart) were released in Australia by Paramount Home Entertainment.

As of August 2026, all 26 episodes are currently available on Fandango, Amazon Prime Video, and Tubi.

== Revival ==
On April 3, 2026, it was announced that Ryan Coogler's production company Proximity Media had acquired the rights to the book series to be turned into a television series for Disney+ with 20th Television. Bayan Wolcott was attached as writer and executive producer, and Sev Ohanian, Coogler, and his wife Zinzi Coogler serving as executive producers on behalf of Proximity Media. Iole Lucchese and Caitlin Friedman were announced to executive produce via Scholastic. Proximity Media’s Simone Harris and Dezi Gallegos were also announced to oversee the project.

== See also ==
- List of Animorphs books
- Manimal
- Sheena
