= SNICK =

American television programming block

- SNICK's 1992–2000 logo
- Network: Nickelodeon
- Launched: August 15, 1992
- Closed: January 29, 2005
- Country of origin: United States
- Owner: Viacom
- Running time: 120 minutes
- Official website: Official website

SNICK (short for Saturday Night Nickelodeon) was a two-hour programming block on the American children's cable television network Nickelodeon, aimed towards preteen and teen audiences, older than the target audiences of most Nickelodeon programming. It ran from August 15, 1992, until January 29, 2005, and was aired on Saturdays starting at 8 p.m and ending at 10 p.m. ET, with a replay on Sundays from 5 p.m. to 7 p.m. In 2005, SNICK was revamped as the Saturday night edition of TEENick. Nickelodeon continued to run a Saturday night programming block until 2021, although since the TEENick name was discontinued in February 2009, the block did not go by any name, with the exception of Gotta See Saturdays in fall 2012.

== Background ==
At the time of SNICK's creation, traditional networks such as ABC, NBC, and CBS did not have a specific programming block for younger viewers on Saturday nights. The consensus at the time was that viewers who were 50 years of age and older were the only ones watching available, since younger viewers traditionally went out on Saturday nights. This would explain why shows such as NBC's The Golden Girls and Empty Nest were the most predominant shows on Saturday nights at the time. Previously on Saturdays, Nickelodeon themselves had the Saturday night timeslot to older sitcoms from the channel's late night programming block, Nick at Nite.

Then-Nickelodeon president, Geraldine Laybourne, wanted to expose the myth that there was no audience for children's programming on Saturday nights. Laybourne was a purveyor of market niche-talk, which was a strategy of programming highly focused programs targeted to specific groups defined by age, gender, race, education, religion or any of a number of other factors. In theory, the audience who would most likely watch SNICK would be too young to be out on the town and too old to be in bed by eight.

Laybourne believed that the original shows on the SNICK block would double Nickelodeon's audience on Saturday night by as many as 650,000 to one million viewers. According to Nickelodeon, about one-third of Ren & Stimpy's audience, more than a million viewers, were between the ages of 18 and 35. By early 1993, Nickelodeon (according to A.C. Nielsen ratings) was the number one network among viewers ages 6–11 on Saturday nights. With a 6.4 age-group rating, Nickelodeon beat Fox's 5.5, NBC's 5.2, CBS' 4.8, and ABC's 3.2 ratings.

== History ==
=== 1992–2000: Original SNICK ===
SNICK debuted on August 15, 1992, with two programs that previously aired on Sundays (the teen sitcom Clarissa Explains It All and The Ren & Stimpy Show) and the network premieres of Roundhouse (a musical sketch comedy-variety series) and Are You Afraid of the Dark? (a horror fantasy-drama anthology series).

Three new shows (The Adventures of Pete and Pete, The Secret World of Alex Mack, and All That) premiered on the block between 1994 and 1995, with the latter two replacing Clarissa and Roundhouse's time slots, which both shows had ended their runs. By this time, much of SNICK's programming had diversified to the point of making room for other new programs by replacing their existing shows or scheduling them in different time slots.

On some occasions, the block would run a series of interstitial shorts in-between regular broadcast, known as "SNICK Snack", or special programming events.

Many bumpers and advertising promos for SNICK featured the programming block's mascot, dubbed "The Big Orange Couch," in several places, including in different Nickelodeon shows (front of the Midnight Society's campfire, Ren and Stimpy's house, the Roundhouse, among others), as well as various real life and fictional locations.

It was retired in June 1999, when the Big Orange Couch, filled with $25,000 and 6,000 cookies, was given to a viewer in a contest during a live event celebrating Nickelodeon's 20 years on television. However, the couch was briefly returned from 2000–2001, in which it was redesigned.

=== 2000–2001: SNICK House ===
On October 14, 2000, SNICK was revamped and was renamed to the SNICK House, and with this came a number of changes. The block was now hosted by Nick Cannon, and each week, a celebrity or music group made an appearance. The format was very similar to the TEENick block, which premiered three months later, but was more of a party.

Each week, viewers could go online and vote for their favorite SNICK House Video Picks. The winning music video would then be played during the block. The SNICK House was cancelled on July 7, 2001, making the way for the return of the regular SNICK block.

=== 2001–2002: Elevator Music Era ===
After SNICK House was cancelled on July 1, 2001, with the last program aired being All That, Nick replaced SNICK's normal slot with "Nick Flicks", which featured 90-minute Nicktoon specials followed by The Brothers García. This went on from July 7, 2001, to January 12, 2002, and from June 29, 2002, to September 7, 2002.

On January 19, 2002, the brand new SNICK began with a whole new lineup, including a brand new season and subsequently a new cast of All That, which had been on hiatus for a year and a half. Bumpers now featured still pictures of various SNICK stars with a SNICK "talk bubble" above them, with elevator music playing in the background.

=== 2002–2004: SNICK On-Air Dare ===
Starting on September 21, 2002, SNICK featured a series of On-Air Dare segments featuring members of the All That cast. All but three members of the cast would pull a lever to determine the night's "dare", which one of the three would have to do. The three cast members from All That in each segment would be placed in a glass cylinder and one would be randomly chosen to participate in a dare. If chosen, two security guards enter and grab the cast member (as if they were arrested) so they would not escape. This appears to have been based on Fear Factor.

Some of these dares included singing the National Anthem in a diaper, apple bobbing in a toilet, taking a bath in a tub of raw eggs, eating a couple gallons of blue cheese, being painted with peanut butter and licked by dogs, hanging upside down and being dipped in dog food, having buckets of worms dumped on the cast member's head, drinking a gallon of sweat, sitting in a giant bowl of chili, eating 1,000 toe nails, the cast member putting an entire scorpion in their mouth, the cast member being pecked by hungry chickens, or shaving their school principal's legs.

During this era of SNICK, the SNICK line-ups went through some major transitions that included the cancellations of The Nick Cannon Show and Cousin Skeeter and the premiere of a new show, Romeo!.

In 2003, design company Beehive created brand new bumpers for SNICK, featuring an orange splat morphing into a show's character. Instead of saying "SNICK", the announcer said "Saturday Night Nickelodeon".

=== 2004–2005: Saturday Night on Nickelodeon era and the end of SNICK ===
On September 4, 2004, SNICK was quietly rebranded as Saturday Night on Nickelodeon. However, the SNICK name was still used during live on-air segments.

On January 29, 2005, SNICK aired for the last time and was replaced the following week by a Saturday night version of TEENick. The TEENick block name was discontinued in February 2009, in preparation for the launch of a separate channel named after the block, TeenNick. TeenNick launched in September 2009, and much of its programming was sourced from the original TEENick block.

=== 2011: SNICK on The '90s Are All That ===
In July 2011, TeenNick begin airing 1990s era Nickelodeon shows starting at 12:00 am Eastern Time under the banner The '90s Are All That. SNICK programs that originally aired on the block's lineup were All That, Kenan & Kel, and Clarissa Explains It All. In December 2011, it was announced that the week of December 26, 2011, up until New Year's Eve that TeenNick would air classic SNICK lineups from each year of the 1990s, with a special marathon airing New Year's Eve, all with classic SNICK and Nickelodeon bumpers from the 1990s.

On August 17, 2013, SNICK returned to The '90s Are All That, for its "SNICK-iversary", celebrating its 21st anniversary, reaching the drinking age if it were a person. The original lineup was aired (Clarissa Explains It All, The Ren & Stimpy Show and Are You Afraid of the Dark?) with the exception of Roundhouse being replaced by All That.

=== 2017: SNICK on NickSplat ===
Since the block's 2011 resurgence, SNICK has returned to TeenNick three times. The first two under the block timeslot of The '90s Are All That, which was renamed to The Splat on October 5, 2015, and was renamed once again as NickSplat on May 1, 2017. SNICK's third appearance on TeenNick was to celebrate SNICK's 25th anniversary by airing episodes Saturday nights during the month of August 2017.

August 5, 2017:

- 12:00AM – The Adventures of Pete and Pete
- 12:30AM – Clarissa Explains It All
- 1:00AM – Are You Afraid of the Dark?
- 1:30AM – The Ren & Stimpy Show

August 12, 2017:

- 12:00AM – All That
- 12:30AM – All That
- 1:00AM – Kenan & Kel
- 1:30AM – Kenan & Kel

August 15, 2017:

- 10:00PM – Clarissa Explains It All
- 10:30PM – Roundhouse
- 11:00PM – The Ren & Stimpy Show
- 11:30PM – Are You Afraid of the Dark?

August 19, 2017:

- 12:00AM – KaBlam!
- 12:30AM – Rugrats
- 1:00AM – CatDog
- 1:30AM – The Angry Beavers

August 26, 2017:

- 12:00AM – The Amanda Show
- 12:30AM – The Amanda Show
- 1:00AM – All That
- 1:30AM – All That

== SNICK line-ups ==
The following are the shows aired during SNICK for the year listed. Although these are the standard shows aired, some days would see variation in the SNICK line-up.

SNICK (August 1992 – October 1999) (Note: All these shows aired from 8 p.m.-10 p.m. ET (though the schedule was briefly extended to 8–10:30 p.m. ET in the summer of 1994) with the ending having the Big Orange Couch and above that a clock counting down until next week's broadcast.)
Year	8:00 PM	8:30 PM	9:00 PM	9:30 PM
1992 – Summer 1994	Clarissa Explains It All	Roundhouse	The Ren & Stimpy Show	Are You Afraid of the Dark?
Summer 1994 – October 1994	Clarissa Explains It All	The Adventures of Pete & Pete	The Ren & Stimpy Show	Are You Afraid of the Dark?
October 1994 – January 1995	The Secret World of Alex Mack	The Adventures of Pete & Pete	The Ren & Stimpy Show	Are You Afraid of the Dark?
January 1995 – Early 1996	The Secret World of Alex Mack	All That	The Ren & Stimpy Show	Are You Afraid of the Dark?
Early 1996 – Spring 1996	The Secret World of Alex Mack	Space Cases	All That	Are You Afraid of the Dark?
Spring 1996 – October 5, 1996	The Secret World of Alex Mack	Space Cases	All That	The Adventures of Pete & Pete
October 12, 1996 – Early 1997	Kenan & Kel	All That	Space Cases	Are You Afraid of the Dark?
Early 1997 – August 1997	Kenan & Kel	All That	The Mystery Files of Shelby Woo	KaBlam!
August 1997 – November 1997	Rugrats	All That	Kenan & Kel	KaBlam!
November 1997 – May 1998	Rugrats	All That	Kenan & Kel	The Journey of Allen Strange
May 1998 – October 1998	Rugrats	Kenan & Kel	All That	Animorphs
November 1998 – February 1999	The Angry Beavers	Kenan & Kel	All That	Animorphs
February 1999 – October 1999	Rugrats	All That	Kenan & Kel	Are You Afraid of the Dark?
SNICK House (October 1999 – Summer 2001)
October 1999 – Mid-2000	Rugrats	The Amanda Show	100 Deeds for Eddie McDowd	All That
Mid-2000 – Fall 2000	Rugrats	100 Deeds for Eddie McDowd	The Amanda Show	All That
Fall – Winter 2000	The Amanda Show	Noah Knows Best	Caitlin's Way	All That
Winter 2000 – Spring 2001	SpongeBob SquarePants	The Amanda Show	100 Deeds for Eddie McDowd	All That
Spring 2001 – Summer 2001	SpongeBob SquarePants	The Amanda Show	The Brothers García	All That
SNICK (Winter 2002 – 2005)
Winter 2002 – June 2002	All That	The Amanda Show	Taina	The Nick Cannon Show
Fall 2002 – June 2003	All That	The Nick Cannon Show	The Amanda Show	Cousin Skeeter
June 2003 – December 2003	All That	Romeo!	The Amanda Show	Are You Afraid of the Dark?
December 2003 – September 2004	All Grown Up!	Romeo!	All That	Are You Afraid of the Dark?
September 2004 – January 2005	All Grown Up!	Romeo!	All That	Are You Afraid of the Dark?

== Special line-ups ==
Some schedules were only aired once.

Year	8:00 PM	8:30 PM	9:00 PM	9:30 PM
September 18, 1993	Clarissa Explains It All	Roundhouse	The Ren & Stimpy Show	Rocko's Modern Life
October 15, 1994	The Secret World of Alex Mack	My Brother and Me	The Ren & Stimpy Show	Are You Afraid of the Dark?
October 29, 1994	Aaahh!!! Real Monsters	The Adventures of Pete & Pete	Are You Afraid of the Dark?	Are You Afraid of the Dark?
October 28, 1995	The Secret World of Alex Mack	Aaahh!!! Real Monsters	Are You Afraid of the Dark?	Are You Afraid of the Dark?
November 25, 1995	Rugrats	Rocko's Modern Life	Doug	Aaahh!!! Real Monsters

== Home video releases ==
In August 1993, Nickelodeon released two VHS tapes meant to recreate the SNICK-watching experience by including episodes from all four of the original SNICK shows: Clarissa Explains It All, Roundhouse, The Ren & Stimpy Show, and Are You Afraid of the Dark? The tapes also included episodes of the original The Adventures of Pete & Pete shorts in between each SNICK show, as well as SNICK bumpers featuring the Big Orange Couch. The videos were released through Sony Wonder and came in orange-colored VHS tapes.

=== Volume 1: Nick SNICKS Friendship ===
- Clarissa Explains It All: Season 3 Episode 1 "Sam's Swan Song"
- Roundhouse: Season 1 Episode 2 "New Kid In Town"
- The Ren & Stimpy Show: Season 1 Episode 7 "The Littlest Giant"
- Are You Afraid of the Dark?: Season 1 Episode 3 "The Tale of the Lonely Ghost"
- The Adventures of Pete & Pete shorts "Artie, the Strongest Man in the World," "X-Ray Man," and "Route 34"

=== Volume 2: Nick SNICKS The Family ===
- Clarissa Explains It All: Season 1 Episode 12 "Cool Dad"
- Roundhouse: Season 1 Episode 1 "You Can't Fire Your Family"
- The Ren & Stimpy Show: Season 2 Episode 13 "Fake Dad"
- Are You Afraid of the Dark?: Season 1 Episode 5 "The Tale of the Hungry Hounds"
- The Adventures of Pete & Pete shorts "The Burping Room," "Mom's Plate," and "The Punishment"
