= In a Heartbeat (TV series) =

- Genre: Drama
- Created by: Jon Felson; Steve Reiss; Patricia Green
- Starring: Shawn Ashmore; Reagan Pasternak; Danso Gordon; Christopher Ralph; Lauren Collins; Jackie Rosenbaum
- Theme music composer: Blaise Pascal
- Opening theme: "In a Hearbeat" performed by Blaise Pascal
- Countries of origin: Canada; United States
- Original language: English
- No. of seasons: 1
- No. of episodes: 20

Production
- Executive producers: Keith Pierce; Richard Pierce
- Producer: Kevin Lafferty
- Camera setup: Film; Single-camera
- Production company: AAC Kids

Original release
- Network: Family Channel; Disney Channel
- Release: August 26, 2000 – March 25, 2001

In a Heartbeat is a drama television series inspired by real life EMT squads whose staff consists of high school students in Darien, Connecticut. The series follows the lives of several teenagers who volunteer as part-time EMTs while going to school and trying to maintain their lives as normal teenagers. In Canada, the series was aired on Family Channel while in the United States it was aired on the Disney Channel. The series is fact-based, as there are teenage volunteer EMTs in service all across the United States.

== Synopsis ==
The EMT squad is made up of Hank Beecham (Danso Gordon) who manages playing football with the high school team as well as being the EMT-Intermediate of the group; Val Lanier (Reagan Pasternak) who is noted for being an excellent student and cheerleader; Tyler Connell (Shawn Ashmore), a football player and Hank's best friend; and Jamie Waite (Christopher Ralph), the newest member of the squad initially there not by his own choice but as a result of a new program to help troubled teens get their life together by becoming EMTs.

Other characters in the series are Brooke Lanier (Lauren Collins), Val's twelve-year-old sister who volunteers with the squad after school and whose main job consists of managing the paperwork; and Caitie Roth (Jackie Rosenbaum), Val's best friend, a goth who is known for her dark clothes and purple-streaked hair.

== Cast ==
- Danso Gordon as Hank Beecham
- Reagan Pasternak as Val Lanier
- Shawn Ashmore as Tyler Connell
- Christopher Ralph as Jamie Waite
- Lauren Collins as Brooke Lanier
- Jackie Rosenbaum as Caitie Roth
- Nikki Goodell as Penelope London

== Episodes ==
No.	Title	Directed by	Original release date	Prod. code
1	"Assume Nothing" "Pilot"	Shawn Levy	August 26, 2000	1-22
2	"Things That Go Bump in the Night"	Carl A. Goldstein	September 2, 2000	1-02
3	"The Adventures of Super Val"	Stacey Stewart Curtis	September 9, 2000	1-01
4	"Changing Times"	Stacey Stewart Curtis	September 16, 2000	1-03
5	"Cinderella Syndrome"	Stacey Stewart Curtis	September 23, 2000	1-05
6	"Go Team"	Don McBrearty	September 30, 2000	1-04
7	"And The Winner Is"	Don McBrearty	October 7, 2000	1-06
8	"A Night to Remember"	Stacey Stewart Curtis	October 14, 2000	1-07
9	"New Kid in Town"	Carl Goldstein	November 3, 2000	1-08
10	"You Say It's Your Birthday"	Don McBrearty	November 17, 2000	1-09
11	"Four EMT's and a Kid"	Stefan Scaini	December 8, 2000	1-10
12	"Friends Don't Let Friends..."	Don McCutcheon	December 15, 2000	1-12
13	"Power to the Pathetic"	Larry A. McLean	February 4, 2001	1-11
14	"Race of a Lifetime"	Steve DiMarco	February 11, 2001	1-13
15	"Star Struck"	Don McBrearty	February 18, 2001	1-14
16	"Hero"	James Marshall	February 25, 2001	1-15
17	"The Boy's No Good"	Ron Murphy	March 4, 2001	1-16
18	"Be True to Your School"	Don McCutcheon	March 11, 2001	1-17
19	"Read My Lips"	Ron Murphy	March 18, 2001	1-18
20	"Time's Up"	Don McCutcheon	March 25, 2001	1-19

== Reception ==
Variety's Laura Fries reviewed the show favorably, remarking that "Disney's original high school drama series "In a Heartbeat" has characters every bit as appealing as anything you'd find on the WB, only a heck of a lot smarter." Lynne Heffley of Los Angeles Times described the show as "surprisingly watchable".
