= The Nick Cannon Show =

American comedy television series

- Genre: Comedy
- Created by: Nick Cannon
- Starring: Nick Cannon
- Theme music composer: Nick Cannon; Deric Battiste
- Opening theme: "Aint No Party Like A Nick Cannon Party" performed by Autonomy
- Composer: Craig Stuart Garfinkle
- Country of origin: United States
- Original language: English
- No. of seasons: 2
- No. of episodes: 27

Production
- Executive producers: Mike Tollin; Brian Robbins; Joe Davola
- Producers: Jeff Fisher; Joel Friedman; Jeff Atlas; Todd Baker; Savage Steve Holland; Wayne Conley; Michael Goldman
- Production locations: Nickelodeon on Sunset; Hollywood, California
- Cinematography: Chris Bradley
- Running time: 22 minutes
- Production companies: Tollin/Robbins Productions; Nickelodeon Productions

Original release
- Network: Nickelodeon
- Release: January 12, 2002 – February 22, 2003

The Nick Cannon Show is an American comedy television series created by and starring Nick Cannon for Nickelodeon. It is a spin-off of Nickelodeon's All That, in which Cannon was a former cast member. It aired on Nickelodeon's SNICK block from January 12, 2002, to February 22, 2003, for 27 episodes across two seasons. Its premise is that Nick Cannon finds a situation he thinks needs changing and then "takes over" to make things better or funnier.

Guest stars on the show include Usher, Mary J. Blige, Britney Spears, Eddie Murphy, Will Smith, Willy Santos, Lil' Romeo, Kenan Thompson, Kel Mitchell and girl group 3LW.

== Premise ==
Each episode features host Nick Cannon in a fish-out-of-water situation, such as moving in with strangers, learning rodeo tricks, joining the armed forces, and traveling to London. Cannon described his creative process as "spontaneous", further stating, "I just come up with an idea and then we just see how it goes. That's the beauty of it, to come up with a funny idea and see how far we can take it." At the end of each episode, Cannon writes "Nick Cannon Was Here" on something related to the episode to leave his mark.

== Production ==
Nick Cannon worked as an executive producer, writer, and star of The Nick Cannon Show, which aired on Nickelodeon's Saturday night programming block SNICK at 9:30 PM EST. During this time, Cannon was also working on the films Drumline, which he starred in, and Men in Black II as well as a self-titled music album. After production and crew changes occurred in the second season, the program suffered from low ratings and was canceled in February 2003.

Since its initial airing concluded, the show has not been rebroadcast on Nickelodeon or its sister networks.

== Episodes ==
All episode titles begin with "Nick Takes Over" except for the last episode.

=== Season 1 ===
No. overall	No. in season	Title	Original release date
1	1	"Nick Takes Over Your Family"	January 12, 2002
2	2	"Nick Takes Over Your School"	January 19, 2002
3	3	"Nick Takes Over a Wedding"	January 26, 2002
4	4	"Nick Takes Over the Rodeo"	February 2, 2002
5	5	"Nick Takes Over Hollywood"	February 9, 2002
6	6	"Nick Takes Over Music"	February 16, 2002
7	7	"Nick Takes Over the Beach"	February 23, 2002
8	8	"Nick Takes Over London"	March 2, 2002
9	9	"Nick Takes Over Style"	March 9, 2002
10	10	"Nick Takes Over the Military"	March 16, 2002
11	11	"Nick Takes Over Food"	March 23, 2002
12	12	"Nick Takes Over Baseball"	April 6, 2002
13	13	"Nick Takes Over Nickelodeon"	April 13, 2002
14	14	"Nick Takes Over Fitness"	April 20, 2002

=== Season 2 ===
No. overall	No. in season	Title	Original release date
15	1	"Nick Takes Over the Circus"	September 21, 2002
16	2	"Nick Takes Over a Zoo"	October 5, 2002
17	3	"Nick Takes Over the Mall"	October 12, 2002
18	4	"Nick Takes Over a Hospital"	November 2, 2002
19	5	"Nick Takes Over the Law"	November 9, 2002
20	6	"Nick Takes Over Space"	November 16, 2002
21	7	"Nick Takes Over Holidays"	November 23, 2002
22	8	"Nick Takes Over Transportation"	January 18, 2003
23	9	"Nick Takes Over a Town"	January 25, 2003
24	10	"Nick Takes Over Recreation"	February 1, 2003
25	11	"Nick Takes Over Latanya's Life"	February 1, 2003
26	12	"Nick Takes Over Hawaii"	February 15, 2003
27	13	"The Best of Nick Cannon"	February 22, 2003

== Home media ==
On November 11, 2013, iTunes released volumes 1 and 2 of The Nick Cannon Show with a total of 19 episodes.

== Reception ==
Knight Ridder rated the series premiere a B+, stating, "it's almost sad it airs on a cable network whose audience is viewers under the age of 12." The review concluded that the pilot, "Nick Takes over School", "provides what we say we want: a good, clean laugh for everyone—kids and parents alike."

Preceded by The Brothers García; 2001	Kids' Choice Awards lead-out program The Nick Cannon Show; 2002	Succeeded by All Grown Up! 2003
