= TEENick =

Former programming block on Nickelodeon

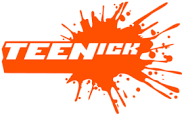
- Network: Nickelodeon
- Launched: March 4, 2001; 25 years ago
- Closed: February 1, 2009; 17 years ago
- Country of origin: United States
- Owner: MTV Networks
- Sister network: List: BET; BET Gospel; BET J; CMT; CMT Pure Country; Comedy Central; Logo; MTV; MTV2; MTV Hits; MTV Jams; MTV Tres; The N; Nicktoons Network; Noggin; Palladia; Spike; TV Land; VH1; VH1 Classic; VH1 Soul

TEENick was an American programming block aimed at adolescents between the ages of 13 and 18 that aired on the American children's cable network, Nickelodeon. It launched on March 4, 2001, and initially aired on Sunday nights from 6-9 p.m. ET/PT before expanding to Saturday nights from 8-10 p.m. ET/PT in 2005, replacing the SNICK block that had been broadcast on the channel since 1992. It was originally hosted by Nick Cannon, and then later hosted by Jason Everhart (aka "J Boogie").

On February 1, 2009, the TEENick name was silently removed from use following a decision to use the Nickelodeon name to brand all of the channel's daytime programming. The similarly-named TeenNick channel launched on September 28 of that year. The channel's name was originally spelled as "TEENick" like its predecessor when it was first announced in early 2009, and the block's original host, Nick Cannon, was named the network's "chairman".

== History ==
TEENick was announced on February 13, 2001 by Cyma Zarghami and offering live-action and animated shows such as Taina, Caitlin's Way and As Told by Ginger, as well as a weekly countdown of viewers' top music-video picks. It aired on Sunday nights from 6 to 9 p.m. ET/PT. In 2005, it was rebroadcast on Saturday from 8 to 10 p.m. ET/PT (replacing the popular SNICK block that started in 1992). Saturday night editions were broadcast as "TEENick Saturday Night" until the end of 2006 where it rebranded as "TEENick" for both broadcasts. The inaugural host was Nick Cannon, followed by Jason Everhart (a.k.a. "J. Boogie"). TEENick's programming mainly consisted of live-action comedies, such as Drake & Josh, Ned's Declassified: School Survival Guide, Zoey 101, True Jackson, VP, and iCarly, as well as occasional reruns of animated shows such as All Grown Up! and My Life as a Teenage Robot.

Meanwhile, The N was an overnight block on Noggin that launched on April 1, 2002, running from 6:00 p.m. to 6:00 a.m. ET every day. Series that previously aired during Noggin's time as an all-ages channel — like A Walk in Your Shoes and Sponk! — migrated to The N. The block spawned several original series, including the animated comedy O'Grady and the live-action dramas Out There and South of Nowhere. The N was also the U.S. broadcast home of Canada's Degrassi: The Next Generation. Like the rest of the Noggin channel, The N's original shows were created with educational goals, which was uncommon for teen programming at the time.

On August 13, 2007, Viacom announced that it would shut down Nick GAS at the end of the year, with a 24-hour version of The N taking over its channel space. The N's standalone network ran for less than two years, from December 31, 2007 to September 28, 2009. A block called "TEENick on The N" introduced several TEENick series into the channel's lineup, including Drake & Josh, Ned's Declassified School Survival Guide, and Zoey 101. According to Polygon, "Nickelodeon began phasing out The N's programming and replacing it with TEENick, an entertainment block with no educational curriculum and zero involvement from Noggin. The N lost its footing by 2009, and both [The N] and its website closed down completely."

=== Replacement ===
TeenNick is the successor to TEENick and The N. The TeenNick channel debuted on September 28, 2009, at 6 a.m. ET, accompanied by the debut of a new logo, designed by New York-based creative director/designer Eric Zim. Nick Cannon, who was the original host of the TEENick block itself, was declared in publicity materials as the "Chairman of TeenNick." Cannon had a major presence on the channel, appearing in network promotions, continuing to be associated in some way with the network until the cancellation of the TeenNick Top 10 in 2018. Several shows from TEENick and The N's program libraries were carried over to the TeenNick channel, though the majority of the programming came from TEENick's library rather than The N's.
