= Drake Bell discography =

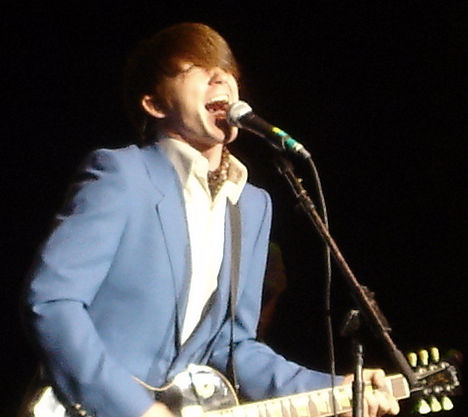
- Bell performing in 2007
- Studio albums: 5
- Extended plays: 3
- Soundtrack albums: 1
- Compilation albums: 1
- Singles: 30
- Video albums: 1
- Music videos: 21
- Promotional singles: 5

American singer-songwriter Drake Bell has released five studio albums, three extended plays, one video album, eighteen singles (including two as a featured artist), five promotional singles, twelve music videos and other album appearances. On September 27, 2005, Bell released his debut album Telegraph. The album includes 12 tracks. His song, "Found a Way"—featured as the theme song for Drake & Josh—is also included on the show's soundtrack. In 2006, Bell signed with Universal Motown. He released his first single, "I Know", on October 17, 2006. The video for "I Know" was filmed in October 2006. As of 2015, the music video for his single "I Know", has received over 10 million views. Bell's second album, It's Only Time, was released on December 5, 2006, and reached Number 81 on Billboard's 200, selling 23,000 copies its first week of release. It's Only Time has sold 178,000 copies as of 2012. Bell features in the Hawk Nelson song, "Bring 'Em Out", from the 2005 film, Yours, Mine and Ours, and on the special edition of Hawk Nelson Is My Friend. Hawk Nelson released that version and the original version on their 2005 EP of the same name. On October 16, 2007, the Radio Disney single edit version of his song "Makes Me Happy", was released on iTunes. Bell also features on Miranda Cosgrove's "Leave It All to Me" single and theme song to the television comedy iCarly. His single "Superhero! Song" was released on April 4, 2008, to promote his film, Superhero Movie, which was released a week prior. His first video album and DVD, entitled Drake Bell in Concert, was released on December 16, 2008. It peaked at number 81 in the Top 100 Mexican Albums Chart.

Bell's single, "Terrific", was released on June 14, 2011, and was also included on an EP titled A Reminder, released on June 28, 2011, also featuring the songs "You’re Not Thinking", "Big Shot" and "Speak My Mind". The EP was produced by John Fields, who previously worked with Rooney, Jimmy Eat World, Selena Gomez, the Jonas Brothers, and Bleu. Bell said he decided to release A Reminder because he hasn't put out new music in a few years and "a full album will probably not happen until next year." Bell's unreleased songs with Daniella Monet, "Lookin' Like Magic" and "Wishful Thinking", appear in the films A Fairly Odd Movie: Grow Up, Timmy Turner! and its sequel, A Fairly Odd Christmas. Bell's holiday single, "Christmas Promise", was released on December 17, 2013. Bell's third album, Ready Steady Go! was released on April 22, 2014, and is his first album released under the record label Surfdog Records. Bell's single "Bitchcraft", was remixed by Caravan Palace. The remix was released as a single in 2014. Bell's song "Bull" peaked at number 8 on the Exametro Top Ten De Musica chart, which charts songs in the top ten in Mexico. "Bull" appears in the trailer for the animated film Birds of Paradise, which he also stars in. Bell's unreleased songs, "What You Need" and "Solo Flight", appear in the film, Wings: Sky Force Heroes.

As of 2011, Bell has sold over 1 million singles in the United States.

== Albums ==
=== Studio albums ===
List of studio albums, with selected chart positions
Title	Album details	Peak chart positions				Sales
Title	Album details	US	US Rock	US Indie	MEX	Sales
Telegraph	Release date: August 23, 2005; Re-release date: August 7, 2007; Formats: CD, LP, digital download; Label: Nine Yards, Backhouse (re-release)	—	—	—	—	
It's Only Time	Release date: December 5, 2006; Formats: CD, digital download; Label: Universal Motown	81	21	—	4	US: 178,000 (Note: United States sales figures for It's Only Time as of August 2012.)
Ready Steady Go!	Release date: April 22, 2014; Formats: CD, LP, digital download; Label: Surfdog	182	50	32	5	US: 2,000 (Note: United States sales figures for Ready Steady Go! as of its first week of release.)
The Lost Album	Release date: February 21, 2020; Formats: LP, digital download; Label: dB Records	—	—	—	—	
Sesiones en Casa	Release date: October 30, 2020; Formats: Digital download; Label: dB Records	—	—	—	—	
Non-Stop Flight	Release date: October 25, 2024; Formats: Digital download; Label: dB Records	—	—	—	—	
"—" denotes releases that did not chart or were not released in that territory.

=== Compilations albums ===
List of compilation albums, with selected chart positions
Title	Album details	Peak chart positions				Sales
Title	Album details	US	ARG	MEX	SPA	Sales
Sesiones en Casa	Release date: October 30, 2020; Formats: Digital download; Label: dB Records	—	—	—	—	—

=== Soundtrack albums ===
List of studio albums, with selected chart positions
Title	Album details	Peak chart positions		Sales
Title	Album details	US	US OST	Sales
Drake & Josh	Released: February 22, 2005; Formats: CD, digital download; Label: Nick	178	21	US: 1,260 (Note: United States sales figures for Drake & Josh as of its first week of release)

=== Extended plays ===
List of EPs, with selected chart positions
Title	EP details	Peak chart positions
Title	EP details	MEX
A Reminder	Released: June 28, 2011; Format: Digital download; Label: Drake Bell Entertainment, Inc.	5
Honest	Released: June 30, 2017; Format: LP, Digital download; Label: dB Records	—
Smoke It Up	Released: February 16, 2019; Format: Digital download; Label: dB Records	—
"—" denotes releases that did not chart or were not released in that territory.

== Singles ==
=== As lead artist ===
List of singles as lead artist, with selected chart positions
Title	Year	Peak chart positions					Album
Title	Year	US Bub.	US Pop	US Digital	MEX	MEX Rock	Album
"I Know"	2006	—	—	—	1	1	It's Only Time
"Makes Me Happy"	2007	3	67	45	—	—	It's Only Time
"Terrific"	2011	—	—	—	1	1	A Reminder
"Christmas Promise"	2013	—	—	—	—	—	—N/a
"Bitchcraft" (featuring Brian Setzer)	2014	—	—	—	—	—	Ready Steady Go!
"Bull"	2014	—	—	—	8	1	Ready Steady Go!
"Run Away"	2017	—	—	—	—	—	Honest
"Honest"	2017	—	—	—	—	—	Honest
"Call Me When You're Lonely" (featuring Lil Mama)	2018	—	—	—	—	—	—N/a
"First Thing in the Morning" (featuring Mike Taylor)	2018	—	—	—	—	—	—N/a
"Gucci Gang"	2018	—	—	—	—	—	—N/a
"Fuego Lento"	2018	—	—	—	—	—	—N/a
"Smoke It Up"	2019	—	—	—	—	—	Smoke It Up
"Fuego Lento (En Español)"	2019	—	—	—	—	—	—N/a
"No Perdamos Más Tiempo" (featuring Jorge Blanco)	2019	—	—	—	—	—	—N/a
"MIA"	2019	—	—	—	—	—	—N/a
"Vertigo"	2019	—	—	—	—	—	—N/a
"All Alone At The Disco"	2019	—	—	—	—	—	—N/a
"Diosa"	2020	—	—	—	—	—	—N/a
"Waiting for the World"	2020	—	—	—	—	—	—N/a
"What You Need"	2021	—	—	—	—	—	—N/a
"supalonley"	2021	—	—	—	—	—	—N/a
"La Camisa Negra"	2023	—	—	—	—	—	Non-Stop Flight
"Going Away"	2023	—	—	—	—	—	Non-Stop Flight
"Every Day Is Christmas With You"	2023	—	—	—	—	—	—N/a
"I Kind Of Relate"	2024	—	—	—	—	—	Non-Stop Flight
"Hollywouldn't"	2024	—	—	—	—	—	Non-Stop Flight
"Te Desenamoraste"	2024	—	—	—	—	—	Non-Stop Flight
"By The Ocean"	2024	—	—	—	—	—	Non-Stop Flight
"Dandelion"	2024	—	—	—	—	—	Non-Stop Flight
"Break your Heart" (featuring Kevin Roldán)	2025	—	—	—	—	—	—N/a
"Nevermind (Piano Diaries)" (with Toby Gad)	2026	—	—	—	—	—	—N/a

=== As featuring artist ===
List of singles as a featuring artist, with selected chart positions
Title	Year	Peak chart positions		Album
Title	Year	US	US Pop	Album
"Leave It All to Me" (Miranda Cosgrove featuring Drake Bell)	2007	100	83	iCarly
"Oh, Girl (aka Diva Eyes)" (Kai Danzberg featuring Drake Bell)	2020	—	—	Untitled Album

=== Promotional singles ===
List of singles
Title	Year	Album	Notes
"Superhero! Song"	2008	—N/a	Digital Download
"Unbelievable"	2009	—N/a	Released on MySpace only
"Modern Times"	2009	—N/a	Released on MySpace only
"I Won't Stand In Your Way" (featuring Brian Setzer)	2014	Ready Steady Go!	Vinyl
"Bitchcraft" (Caravan Palace Remix)	2014	—N/a	Digital Download

== Other appearances ==
Title	Year	Other(s) artist(s)	Album
"Highway to Nowhere"	2006	—N/a	Zoey 101 Music Mix
"I Know"	2008	—N/a	Total Girl: The Slumber Party Album
"Bring 'Em Out"	2008	Hawk Nelson	Hawk Nelson Is My Friend
"Makes Me Happy"	2008	—N/a	YTV Big Fun Party Mix, Vol. 9
"I Know"	2010	—N/a	Pure Love Songs Vol. 2
"Lookin' Like Magic"	2011	Daniella Monet	A Fairly Odd Movie: Grow Up, Timmy Turner!
"Jingle Bells"	2012	—N/a	Merry Nickmas
"Wishful Thinking"	2012	Daniella Monet	A Fairly Odd Christmas
"What You Need" (credited as "Alpha Beta")	2014	—N/a	Wings: Sky Force Heroes
"Solo Flight"	2014	—N/a	Wings: Sky Force Heroes
"Day & Night"	2015	—N/a	L.A. Slasher

== Videography ==
=== Video albums ===
List of Video albums
Title	Album details	Peak chart positions
Title	Album details	MEX
Drake Bell in Concert	Released: December 16, 2008; Formats: DVD; Label: Universal Motown	81

=== Music videos ===
List of music videos, showing year released and director
Title	Year	Director	Notes
"Don't Go (Girls and Boys)"	2004	Rainbows & Vampires	Fefe Dobson's music video; guest appearance
"Found a Way"	2005	Josh Peck	
"I Know"	2006	Neon	
"Leave It All to Me"	2007	Dan Schneider	Featured video; Miranda Cosgrove's music video
"Our Love"	2010	Walter May	
"You're Not Thinking"	2011	Drake Bell	
"Terrific"	2011	Cameron Hopkins	
"Terrific" (2nd version)	2011	Cameron Hopkins	
"Learn to Fly"	2011	Jesse Peretz	Action Item's music video; guest appearance
"Get the Girl Back"	2013	Adam Neustadter	Hanson's music video; guest appearance
"Christmas Promise"	2013	Drake Bell	
"Terrible Person"	2013	Brad Scott	SuperNaked's music video; guest appearance
"Bitchcraft"	2014	Paul Boyd	
"Run Away"	2017	Drake Bell	
"Honest"	2018	Michael Parenteau	
"Rewind"	2018	Michael Parenteau	
"Fuego Lento"	2019	The Broducers	
"Going Away"	2023	Chris Applebaum	
"I Kind Of Relate"	2024	Rodolfo Carmona	
"Te Desenamoraste"	2024	Rodolfo Carmona	
"By The Ocean"	2024	Rodolfo Carmona	
