= List of songs recorded by Drake Bell =

Below are a list of songs by singer-songwriter Drake Bell.

== List ==
| Title | Year | Album | Author(s) | Lead vocal(s) | Chart position US | Notes |
|---|---|---|---|---|---|---|
| "All Alone At The Disco" | 2019 | All Alone At The Disco - Single | C.J. Abraham; Drake Bell; Michael Corcoran | Drake Bell | — | |
| "Baby Let's Play House" | 2014 | Unreleased | Arthur Gunter | Drake Bell | — | Cover |
| "Back of My Hand" | 2014 | Ready, Steady, Go! | John Alder; Nicholas Watkinson | Drake Bell | — | Cover |
| "Big Shot" | 2011 | A Reminder | Drake Bell; Harlan Silverman | Drake Bell | — | |
| "Bitchcraft" | 2014 | Ready, Steady, Go! | Drake Bell; Brett Boyett | Drake Bell | — | |
| "Break Me Down" | 2006 | It's Only Time | C.J. Abraham; Drake Bell; Michael Corcoran | Drake Bell | — | |
| "Bull" | 2014 | Ready, Steady, Go! | Cask Mouse | Drake Bell | — | Cover |
| "California Man" | 2014 | Ready, Steady, Go! | Roy Wood | Drake Bell | — | Cover |
| "Call Me When You're Lonely" | 2018 | N/A | Drake Bell; Lil Mama | Drake Bell, Lil Mama | — | |
| "Christmas Promise" | 2013 | Christmas Promise - Single | Drake Bell; Michael Corcoran | Drake Bell | — | |
| "Circles" | 2005 | Telegraph | Drake Bell | Drake Bell | — | |
| "Comin' Back For You" | 2019 | Smoke It Up | Drake Bell; Lil Mama | Drake Bell, Lil Mama | — | |
| "Crazy Little Thing Called Love" | 2014 | Ready, Steady, Go! | Freddie Mercury | Drake Bell | — | Cover |
| "Don't Preach" | 2005 | Telegraph | C.J. Abraham; Drake Bell; Michael Corcoran | Drake Bell | — | |
| "Down We Fall" | 2005 | Telegraph | Drake Bell; Michael Corcoran | Drake Bell | — | |
| "End It Good" | 2006 | It's Only Time | C.J. Abraham; Drake Bell; Michael Corcoran | Drake Bell | — | |
| ”Every Day Is Christmas With You” | 2023 | Every Day Is Christmas With You | Drake Bell | Drake Bell | - | |
| "Fallen For You" | 2006 | It's Only Time | C.J. Abraham; Drake Bell; Michael Corcoran | Drake Bell | — | |
| "First First Thing in the Morning" | 2018 | N/A | Drake Bell | Drake Bell, Mike Taylor | — | |
| "Fool The World" | 2006 | It's Only Time | Drake Bell; Michael Corcoran | Drake Bell, Michael Corcoran | — | |
| "Found a Way" | 2005 | Telegraph; It's Only Time | Drake Bell; Michael Corcoran | Drake Bell | — | |
| "Fuego Lento" | 2018 | N/A | Drake Bell | Drake Bell | — | |
| "Fuego Lento (En Español)" | 2019 | N/A | Drake Bell | Drake Bell | — | |
| "Give Me a Little More Time" | 2014 | Ready, Steady, Go! | Drake Bell; Will Herrington; Daniel Kalisher | Drake Bell | — | |
| ”Going Away” | 2024 | ‘’Non-Stop Flight’’ | Drake Bell | Drake Bell | - | |
| "Golden Days" | 2005 | Telegraph | D. Tashian; Drake Bell; G. Garner | Drake Bell | — | |
| "Gucci Gang" | 2018 | N/A | Lil Pump | Drake Bell | — | Cover |
| "Highway to Nowhere" | 2005 | Telegraph | Drake Bell; M. Shallman; S.W. Bennett | Drake Bell | — | |
| "Hollywood Girl" | 2005 | Telegraph | Drake Bell; G. Petersen; Michael Corcoran | Drake Bell | — | |
| "Honest" | 2017 | Honest | Drake Bell | Drake Bell | — | |
| "I Know" | 2006 | It's Only Time | C.J. Abraham; Drake Bell; Michael Corcoran | Drake Bell | — | |
| "I Won't Stand In Your Way" | 2014 | Ready, Steady, Go! | Brian Setzer | Drake Bell | — | Cover |
| "In the End" | 2005 | Telegraph | Drake Bell; Michael Corcoran | Drake Bell | — | |
| "Intro" | 2005 | Telegraph | Drake Bell; Michael Corcoran | — | — | |
| "It's Only Time" | 2006 | It's Only Time | C.J. Abraham; Drake Bell; Michael Corcoran | Drake Bell | — | |
| "It's Still Rock and Roll to Me" | 2014 | Ready, Steady, Go! | Billy Joel | Drake Bell | — | Cover |
| "Jingle Bells" | 2008; 2012 | Merry Christmas, Drake & Josh; Merry Nickmas | James Pierpont | Drake Bell | — | Cover |
| "Leaves" | 2017 | Honest | Drake Bell | Drake Bell | — | |
| "Lonely" | 2008 | Nashville Sessions | Drake Bell | Drake Bell | — | |
| "Long Tall Sally" | 2014 | Unreleased | Enotris Johnson, Robert Blackwell, Richard Penniman | Drake Bell | — | Cover |
| "Makes Me Happy" | 2006; 2014 | It's Only Time; Ready, Steady, Go! | C.J. Abraham; Drake Bell; Michael Corcoran | Drake Bell | 103 | |
| "Melina" | 2014 | Ready, Steady, Go! | Adam Traub | Drake Bell | — | |
| "Modern Times" | 2009 | MySpace Exclusive | C.J. Abraham; Drake Bell; Michael Corcoran | Drake Bell | — | |
| "Nevermind" | 2013 | YouTube Exclusive | Drake Bell; Toby Gad | Drake Bell | — | |
| "OK" | 2008 | Nashville Sessions | Drake Bell | Drake Bell | — | |
| "Our Love" | 2010 | YouTube Exclusive | C.J. Abraham; Drake Bell; Michael Corcoran | Drake Bell | — | |
| "Out There" | 2008 | Nashville Sessions | Drake Bell | Drake Bell | — | |
| "Rewind" | 2017 | Honest | Drake Bell | Drake Bell | — | |
| "Run Away" | 2017 | Honest | Drake Bell | Drake Bell | — | |
| "Runaway Boys" | 2014 | Ready, Steady, Go! | Brian Setzer | Drake Bell | — | Cover |
| "Rusted Silhouette" | 2006 | It's Only Time | C.J. Abraham; Drake Bell; Michael Corcoran | Drake Bell | — | |
| "Samantha" | 2010 | Facebook Exclusive | C.J. Abraham; Michael Corcoran | Drake Bell | — | |
| "Shades of Grey" | 2010 | Unreleased | C.J. Abraham; Drake Bell; Michael Corcoran | Drake Bell | — | |
| "Smoke It Up" | 2019 | Smoke It Up | Drake Bell | Drake Bell | — | |
| "Somehow" | 2005 | Telegraph | Drake Bell; Michael Corcoran | Drake Bell | — | |
| "Soul Man" | 2005 | Drake & Josh | David Porter; Isaac Hayes | Drake Bell, Josh Peck | — | Cover |
| "Speak My Mind" | 2011 | A Reminder | Scott Simmons | Drake Bell | — | Cover |
| "Sunny Afternoon" | 2014 | Ready, Steady, Go! | Ray Davies | Drake Bell | — | Cover |
| "Superhero! Song" | 2008 | Superhero Movie | Drake Bell; Michael Corcoran | Drake Bell | — | |
| "Telegraph" | 2005 | Telegraph | Drake Bell; Michael Corcoran | Drake Bell | — | |
| "Terrific" | 2011 | A Reminder | Drake Bell; Sondre Lerche | Drake Bell | — | |
| "The Backhouse" | 2005 | Telegraph | Drake Bell; Michael Corcoran | Drake Bell | — | |
| "The Plan" | 2019 | Smoke It Up | Drake Bell | Drake Bell | — | |
| "The Spin" | 2008 | Nashville Sessions | Drake Bell | Drake Bell | — | |
| "Unbelievable" | 2009 | MySpace Exclusive | Backhouse Mike, Drake Bell | Drake Bell | — | |
| "Up Periscope" | 2006 | It's Only Time | C.J. Abraham; Drake Bell; Michael Corcoran | Drake Bell | — | |
| "Vertigo" | 2019 | Vertigo - Single | C.J. Abraham; Drake Bell; Michael Corcoran | Drake Bell | — | |
| "What You Need" | 2010 | Unreleased | C.J. Abraham; Drake Bell; Michael Corcoran | Drake Bell | — | |
| "Wrong Side of the Sun" | 2008 | Nashville Sessions | Drake Bell | Drake Bell | — | |
| "Yesterday's Fool" | 2009 | Soundcloud Exclusive | Bleu; Drake Bell | Drake Bell | — | |
| "You're Not Thinking" | 2011 | A Reminder | Drake Bell; Mike Daly; Teddy Geiger | Drake Bell | — | |
| "14U" | 2008 | Nashville Sessions | Drake Bell | Drake Bell | — | |
| "Every Day Is Christmas With You" | 2023 | - | Drake Bell, Kai Danzberg | Drake Bell | — | |
| "I Kind Of Relate" | 2024 | Non-Stop Flight | Drake Bell, Kai Danzberg, Michael Corcoran (Backhouse Mike) | Drake Bell | — | |
