= Drake Bell in Concert =

Video by Drake Bell
- Released: December 16, 2008
- Recorded: 2008
- Genre: Pop rock
- Length: 78:51
- Label: Universal Motown
- Producer: Drake Bell

Drake Bell chronology
It's Only Time (2006)	Drake Bell in Concert (2008)	A Reminder (2011)

Drake Bell in Concert is a video album by American singer-songwriter Drake Bell. It was released on December 16, 2008, by Universal Motown Records. The album consists of songs and performances recorded during his performance at Auditorio Nacional in Mexico. It debuted at number 81 on the Top 100 Mexican Albums chart. It also features two new songs and five covers, which are exclusive to the DVD.

== Track listing ==
1. "Up Periscope"
2. "Do What You Want"
3. "Saturday Night"
4. "Sea Song"
5. "I Know"
6. "Makes Me Happy"
7. "Fool the World"
8. "Joining a Fan Club "
9. "Found a Way"
10. "Somehow"
11. "Too Hip Gotta Go"
12. "Fallen For You"
13. "Rusted Silhouette"
14. "Break Me Down"
15. "End It Good"
16. "C.C. Rider"
17. "All Alone At The Disco"
18. "Little Miss Prissy"

== Charts ==
Chart (2008)	Peak position
Mexican Albums (Top 100 Mexico)	81
