= Really Big Shrimp =

- Drake & Josh episode
- Promotional artwork for the finale
- Episode no.: Season 4 Episode 17
- Directed by: Drake Bell (Part 1); Steve Hoefer (Part 2)
- Written by: Dan Schneider; George Doty IV
- Original air date: August 3, 2007

Episode chronology
← Previous "Megan's First Kiss" (production order)	Next → —

"Really Big Shrimp" is the television special and series finale of the Nickelodeon sitcom Drake & Josh. The episode first aired on August 3, 2007, and was Nickelodeon's highest-rated television event at that time, with 5.8 million viewers.

== Plot ==
During a music showcase at the Premiere movie theater, Drake (Drake Bell) performs his new song "Makes Me Happy" for a music deal from record producer Alan Krim (mentioned in the series' first television film) and he succeeds. While at Spin City Records, they agree to put the song in a commercial for Daka Shoe Company's "Air Puffs" line that will air during the Super Bowl. Meanwhile, theater manager Helen Dubois (Yvette Nicole Brown) is getting married and, with many of her family members staying in her apartment, her grandmother Lula comes to stay at the Parker-Nichols house for the week, forcing Drake and Josh (Josh Peck) to share their room with their sister, Megan (Miranda Cosgrove), due to Lula staying in hers instead of the guest room (since Walter has a model train set in there as mentioned in the episode, "The Great Doheny"). In retaliation for this, Megan redecorates her brothers' room to her liking, confines them to a single mattress in a corner with only a lamp and a football accompanying it and threatens to accuse them of vandalizing one of their fellow neighbors' gazebo if they complain about this to their parents as she invites her friends to hang out with her in the room. Helen makes a deal with Craig and Eric to videotape her wedding to save money for her upcoming honeymoon.

Helen then promotes the Premiere's latest employee and Josh's ex-girlfriend, Mindy Crenshaw (Allison Scagliotti), as its new assistant manager for fixing a corn dog rotisserie that Josh was unable to. Josh is distraught over not getting the position and accuses Mindy of constantly trying to do better than him, which she denies. Earlier, at the recording studio for Drake's song, Josh is given a contract from Krim to sign, but he fails to read it, as the company's served prawns distract him, and inadvertently signs the creative rights to the song away. An auto-tuned remix of it that Drake is not pleased with is soon developed. Learning about the contract and Josh's involvement in it, a furious Drake bitterly dismisses him as his manager for the blunder. While criticizing Josh for always playing by the rules, Drake tells him that "when people play dirty, sometimes you have to play dirty back".

Attempting to rectify his mistake, Josh returns to Spin City Records. After being told Daka Shoes will use the song's remix over the original version, Josh takes Drake's advice to heart and makes a last-minute switch to the song as it is being picked up. This plan succeeds and the original plays on the commercial, much to the delight of Drake, who finally forgives his brother, but it comes with a price. Right after the commercial airs, Josh is notified by Krim about how he just violated his contract and Spin City plans to sue the duo for five million dollars with the possibility of a prison sentence.

While at work, Mindy panics as Crazy Steve has gone insane due to being mistakenly scheduled on a Monday, which, according to Helen, is "his bad day". Josh manages to calm him down by singing "She'll Be Coming 'Round the Mountain" and telling him to have some milk, for which a hesitant Helen finally appreciates his good work. Mindy then confesses to Josh that she did not take the assistant manager job because she needed extra money or to do better than him at all; she did it because she wanted to spend more time with him, having always regretted breaking up with him. Drake and Josh then go to Spin City Records for a stern talking-to about the contract's violation but, as they are prepared to face the consequences, company president Nick Mateo notifies that Drake's song has received critical acclaim, with thirty thousand emails and telephone calls from fans wishing to purchase it and dozens of downloads crashing their website's server. The duo are then freed of the charges as Mateo dismisses an outraged Krim for his actions.

During Helen's wedding at the Premiere, Craig mistakenly plugs his equipment into a faulty extension cord at Eric's request, resulting in it sparking a building-wide inferno. As Helen expresses disappointment at her wedding being ruined, Josh convinces her that weddings are about a pair of people who love each other getting together surrounded by the people who love them. The wedding soon resumes in the parking lot, where Josh and Mindy get back together. Mindy has quit her job and Helen finally gives Josh the assistant manager position as a reward for his years of hard work. Drake then performs his song to the crowd, dedicating it to the newlyweds and Josh, rehiring him as his manager.

Drake and Josh later return home to find their room restored to its former state, as Lula finally moved, as well as prawns sent over from Mateo. Megan and her friends have eaten all but one, which causes the duo to fight over it, mirroring a popular scene from The Amanda Show, featuring their portrayers fighting over a piece of shrimp, thus ending the series with the same way that Bell and Peck had their first great success together.

== Cast ==
- Drake Bell as Drake Parker: the stepbrother of Josh and brother of Megan. He is working on his debut album in this episode.
- Josh Peck as Josh Nichols: the stepbrother of Drake and Megan and also Drake's manager.
- Miranda Cosgrove as Megan Parker: the sister of Drake and the stepsister of Josh. She moves into Drake and Josh's room while Helen's grandmother, Lula, is staying in hers. She takes up most of the room by redecorating it to her liking.
- Nancy Sullivan as Audrey Parker-Nichols: the mother of Drake and Megan, the stepmother of Josh and the wife of Walter.
- Jonathan Goldstein as Walter Nichols: the stepfather of Drake and Megan, the father of Josh and the husband of Audrey.
- Allison Scagliotti as Mindy Crenshaw: Josh's ex-girlfriend and the assistant manager at the premiere. She takes the job because she wanted to spend more time with Josh, having always regretted breaking up with him. She later quits and the assistant manager position is given to Josh.
- Jerry Trainor as Crazy Steve: A crazy employee at the Premiere known for shouting. He is taking anger management in this episode.
- Yvette Nicole Brown as Helen Dubois: A bride-to-be and the manager of the Premiere. She gets married later in the episode and gives Josh the assistant manager position.
- Anthony Holiday as Buzz Baxter: Helen's fiancé.
- Scott Halberstadt as Eric Blonnowitz: Craig's best friend who is frequently mistaken for the former by Drake. He and Craig videotape Helen's wedding.
- Alec Medlock as Craig Ramirez: Eric's best friend. He and Eric videotape Helen's wedding.
- Cathy Shim as Leah: an employee at the Premiere. She is frequently scared of Crazy Steve due to his outbursts.
- Alysse Cepeda as Molly: a friend of Megan who hits on Josh, much to her other friends' disgust.
- Brenda Vivian as Collete: an employee at Spin City Records.
- Joseph Will as Alan Krim: The vice president of Spin City Records who plans to profit off of Drake's song via a remix of it that he is not pleased with. After Josh makes a last-minute switch to the remix's featuring, Krim threatens to have him and Drake incarcerated for this, only for the original version to receive critical acclaim and he is dismissed for his actions by the company's CEO, Nick Mateo, much to his chagrin.
- Jay Bontatibus as Nick Mateo: the CEO of Spin City Records. He intends to popularize Drake's song and later dismisses Krim for his attempts at profiting off it.
- Thea Vidale as Lula: Helen's short-tempered grandmother. Helen talks the Parker-Nichols family into taking her in for a few days where she stays in Megan's room and Megan redecorates Drake and Josh's room in retaliation. She moves out, being mentioned by Megan having gone to Santa Barbara with Crazy Steve.

== Production ==
The episode aired on August 3, 2007, during Drake vs. Josh weekend and was intended to be the series finale. However, Nickelodeon did not air the final episodes chronologically and aired the episodes Helicopter and Dance Contest after the airing of the finale, with no stated reason. Promotion for Really Big Shrimp included a live competition between Drake Bell and Josh Peck in a quintet of shrimp-based challenges; Bell won three of them.

== Music ==
Drake Bell made a music video for his character's song, "Makes Me Happy", and it became the single for the episode.

== Reception ==
Laura Fries of Variety was mostly positive on Really Big Shrimp, stating that "...Drake and Josh perfectly embody the goofy, unabashed fun that too few remember..." and complimented the two leads on their appeal, but complained that "...[Miranda] Cosgrove's sister Megan is an immensely irritating character."

It was the most watched television event on Nickelodeon up to that time, with 5.8 million viewers. It was the most watched Nickelodeon program until the iCarly film, iGo to Japan, broke the record. The record was later broken again by Merry Christmas, Drake & Josh.
