= Terrific =

Terrific may refer to:

- "Terrific" (song), by Drake Bell
- Terrific (comics), 1960s British comics
