= It's Only Time =

Studio album by Drake Bell
- Released: December 5, 2006
- Recorded: March–June 2006
- Genre: Pop rock
- Length: 34:36
- Label: Universal Motown
- Producer: Backhouse Mike

Drake Bell chronology
Telegraph (2005)	It's Only Time (2006)	Drake Bell in Concert (2008)

Singles from It's Only Time
- 1. "I Know" Released: October 17, 2006; 2. "Makes Me Happy" Released: October 16, 2007; 3. "It's Only Time" Released: December 5, 2006

It's Only Time is the second studio album by singer-songwriter Drake Bell. Universal Motown Records released the album on December 5, 2006. This serves as a follow-up to his debut album, Telegraph. It's Only Time was released on December 5, 2006. There were two singles released for this album. The lead single, "I Know", was released on October 17, 2006. The second single, "Makes Me Happy" was released on October 16, 2007.

The album debuted at #81 on the Billboard 200, selling 23,000 copies its first week of release. As of 2012, over 178,000 copies have been sold in the United States. It's Only Time, along with his live concert album, is also Bell's only album as a Motown artist.

== Background and release ==
The recording of the album began in Spring 2006. Drake Bell wrote all of the songs on the album, however, all the songs were, as with Telegraph, co-written along with either Michael Corcoran and/or C.J. Abraham. The album was produced by Backhouse Mike (Michael Corcoran) and co-produced by Drake and C.J. Abraham, and was mixed by Rob Jacobs and C.J. Abraham. The album cover was photographed by Nabil Elderkin and the art direction of the cover and backcover was by John Pina.

Universal Motown Records, Bell's label at the time, was hesitant to release an album that had no contribution from its musicians or producers, mainly due to the fact that the label was an incarnation of the regular Motown, which usually consisted of African-American soul and R&B artists, but Bell said it only took one song to convince them to release it. Bell also said: "I think having it any other way would feel false. I felt capable that we could get it done, and we did."

The album had two singles, "I Know", released on October 17, 2006. "I Know" also had a music video that aired on MTV two days after the album release which can be found on the deluxe version of the album. And the second single, "Makes Me Happy", which was released on October 16, 2007.

The last four songs on the album form "a narrative about the ups and downs in three different relationships", that go together, without breaks, a credited homage to the second side of The Beatles' Abbey Road.

The album art, featuring Bell in an apparently modern yet retro submarine, is based around the first song on the album, "Up Periscope".

Three versions of the album were released, a standard version which only included the 11 tracks, a deluxe version that came with a bonus DVD and a vinyl sticker, and Walmart's version which was very much similar to the deluxe version but included an extra two tracks which are "Somehow" and "Found A Way" The Walmart version also came with the Vinyl Drake Bell sticker.

This album was followed by Bell's video album, Drake Bell In Concert. However, the next full-length studio album was Ready Steady Go! in 2014.

== Critical reception ==
Professional ratings
Review scores
Source	Rating
Allmusic	4/5 stars
Common Sense Media	4/5 stars
Melodic.net	3/5 stars
MovieVine	(favorable)
Ultimate Guitar	8/10 stars

The album received positive reviews with critics praising Bell's performance and songwriting. The album has also been noted for its heavy Beatles influence. Allmusic wrote in its review of the album, "Drake Bell reveals a knack for charming, well-crafted pop tunes on his 2006 major-label debut, It's Only Time. Clearly a devoted Beatles acolyte, Bell offers up a set of tunes that (surprisingly, for a tween-focused pop celebrity) largely rejects slick modern production in favor of a vintage sound inspired by Abbey Road Studio, as best revealed on the sunny, shimmering "I Know" and the jaunty, piano-driven "Fool the World"."

== Track listing ==
All songs written by Jared Drake Bell, Christopher Jonathan Abraham & Michael Corcoran, except where noted.

Corcoran provided vocals in the second half of the track "Fool The World", but was uncredited.

No.	Title	Writer(s)	Length
1.	"Up Periscope"		3:15
2.	"I Know"		3:45
3.	"Do What You Want"		3:25
4.	"It's Only Time"		3:59
5.	"Found a Way (Acoustic)"	Bell, Corcoran	3:02
6.	"Makes Me Happy"		2:07
7.	"Fool the World"		4:42
8.	"Fallen for You"	Bell, Corcoran	3:16
9.	"Rusted Silhouette"		3:08
10.	"Break Me Down"		2:06
11.	"End It Good"		1:45
Total length:			34:26

Wal-Mart bonus tracks

No.	Title	Writer(s)	Length
12.	"Somehow"	Bell, Corcoran	4:40
13.	"Found a Way"	Bell, Corcoran	2:55

iTunes bonus tracks

No.	Title	Writer(s)	Length
12.	"Telegraph"	Bell, Corcoran	3:39

The DVD which came with the deluxe version contained the following tracks:

1. Guitar Lesson #1
2. Guitar Lesson #2
3. Photoshoot Outtakes
4. Acoustic Performance
5. I Know Official Video

== Singles ==
"I Know", the lead single, was released on October 17, 2006. On a CD Single, and was released as a digital download on November 21, 2006 The official music video was released on December 6, 2006.

The second single, "Makes Me Happy" was released on October 16, 2007, in the form of a Radio Disney edit, available for digital download.

== Music video ==
Drake Bell made one music video for the album. The music video was made for the song "I Know" and a day after the album was released, it was shown on MTV.

== Drake & Josh: Really Big Shrimp ==
In the Drake & Josh TV special Really Big Shrimp, Bell's character in the show gets a record deal and repeatedly plays the song "Makes Me Happy" throughout the movie. The version played in the movie is different than the version that appears on It's Only Time and uses the lyrics from the version of "Makes Me Happy" that can be heard in an episode of Zoey 101.

== Tour ==
Drake Bell toured the US in the summer of 2007 in support of It's Only Time. The tour began on July 7, 2007 in Muskegon, Michigan and ended on September 2, 2007 in Miami, Florida.

Corbin Bleu, Aly & AJ, and Bianca Ryan also supported the tour.

== Commercial performance ==
It's Only Time is Drake Bell's first album to reach the Billboard 200 and his most-successful album with more than 178,000 copies sold in the United States. The album stayed on the Billboard 200 for five weeks, debuting at #81 with 23,000 sold in the first week. It was also on the Rock Album charts for 1 week. In Mexico it was more successful, reaching number four in its chart. The album cut of "Makes Me Happy" charted at No. 3 on the Billboard Bubbling Under Hot 100 charts (the equivalent of No. 103 of the Billboard 100), making it Bell's only song to chart on any Billboard chart. The song also made a brief appearance on the Billboard Pop charts at No. 67. Because the song's popularity, Universal Motown, Bell's record label, decided to release the song as a single in the form of a Radio Disney edit.

== Charts ==
Chart (2006–2007)	Peak position
Mexican Albums (Top 100 Mexico)	4
US Billboard 200	81
US Top Rock Albums (Billboard)	21

== Personnel ==
As listed on Drake Bell's official website.

- Drake Bell - Vocals, Backing Vocals, Guitars
- Backhouse Mike - Vocals, Backing Vocals, Guitars, Bass Guitars, Keyboards, Percussion
- Brian Burwell. - Drums
- Joey Finger - Drums
- Tom Kinne - Bass Guitar
- Alissa Griffith - Backing Vocals
- C.J. Abraham - Backing Vocals, Keyboards, Horns
- Claudia Vossanine - Background Vocals
- DJ Eroc - Scratching
- David Barlia - Ukulele, Jaw Harp
- Joe Travers - Drums
