= The Lost Album =

The Lost Album may refer to:

- The Lost Album (Skyhooks album), 1999
- The Lost Album (Lewis Taylor album), 2005
- The Lost Album, a 2020 album by Drake Bell
- The Lost Album (The Smithereens album), 2022
