= Scott Halberstadt =

American actor (born 1976)

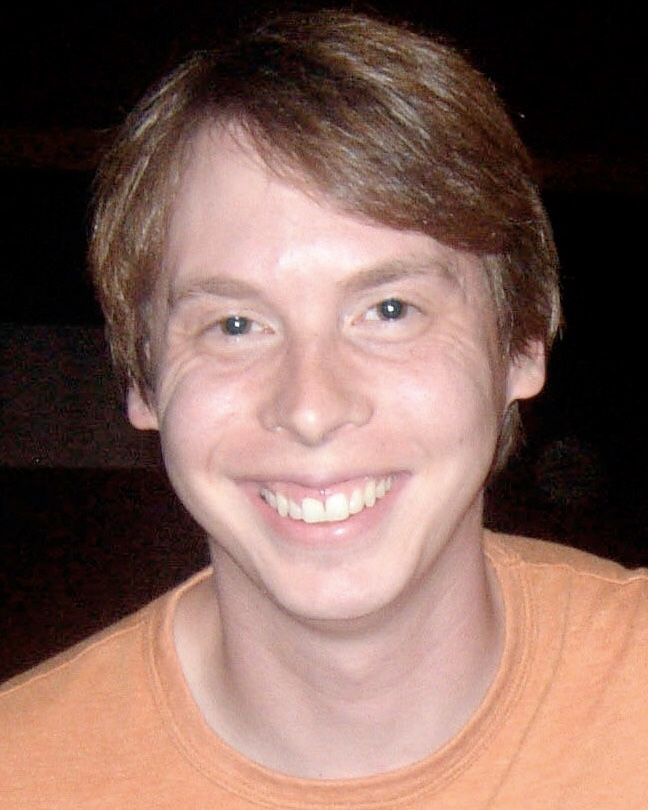
- Halberstadt in October 2007
- Born: 1976 (age 49–50); Connersville, Indiana, U.S.
- Occupations: Actor; data analyst
- Years active: 2000–2010 (acting)
- Spouse: Kate Lee (m. 2008)
- Children: 2

Scott Halberstadt (born 1976) is an American data analyst and former actor. He is best known for playing roles in multiple Nickelodeon shows, most notably as Eric on Drake & Josh. Halberstadt announced his retirement from acting in 2013.

== Early life ==
Halberstadt was born in Connersville, Indiana, to Fred (1939–2010) and Gayle Halberstadt (née Mikesell). He has one brother. He graduated from Connersville High School and attended Ball State University, studying theater.

== Career ==
=== Film ===
Halberstadt's first acting credit is as "Jared" in the 2002 paintball film In Your Face. His next film role was in the 2006 picture Grandma's Boy, where he played a tester who challenges Jeff (Nick Swardson) to a game of Dance Dance Revolution. He also portrayed a pimply casino employee in Smokin' Aces.

=== Television ===
Halberstadt had a recurring role as Eric Blonowitz on the Nickelodeon series Drake & Josh from 2004 to 2007. Despite portraying a teenager, Halberstadt was 27 at the time of the first season's run and was double the age of his co-star Alec Medlock. His other television credits include minor roles in episodes of All That (2000, 2004), The Guardian (2003), Half & Half (2004), The Suite Life of Zack & Cody (2006) and others. He made a cameo appearance in iCarly's "iStart a Fan War", playing Eric (from the Drake & Josh series), alongside Alec Medlock and Jake Farrow.

== Personal life ==
Since 2012, Halberstadt's career has been mostly in data analysis, business intelligence, and management. He currently lives in Homer Glen, Illinois with his wife Kate Lee, who he wed in 2008, and their two children.

== Filmography ==
=== Film ===
Year	Title	Role	Notes
2002	In Your Face	Jared	
2006	Grandma's Boy	Bobby	
2006	The Powder Puff Principle	Lester	
2006	Smokin' Aces	Pimply Casino Employee	
2008	Just a Slice	Todd	Short film
2008	Merry Christmas, Drake & Josh	Eric	Television film

=== Television ===
Year	Title	Role	Notes
2000	All That	Walter Kuberstein	Episode: "Britney Spears"
2003	The Guardian	Noah Grossinger	Episode: "What It Means to You"
2004	Half & Half	Manager	Episode: "The Big Good Help Is Hard to Fire Episode"
2004–2007	Drake & Josh	Eric Blonowitz / Nerdy Boy #2	Guest (season 1), recurring role (season 2–4); 16 episodes
2006	The Suite Life of Zack & Cody	Dirk	Episode: "Twins at the Tipton"
2010	iCarly	Eric Blonowitz	Episode: "iStart a Fan War"
