= Ready Steady Go! (album) =

Studio album by Drake Bell
- Released: April 22, 2014
- Recorded: 2012–13
- Genres: Rockabilly; rock and roll; pop
- Length: 38:34
- Labels: Surfdog; Warner Music; ADA
- Producers: Brian Setzer (exec.); Peter Collins

Drake Bell chronology
A Reminder (2011)	Ready Steady Go! (2014)	Honest (2017)

Singles from Ready Steady Go!
- 1. "Bitchcraft" Released: January 28, 2014

Ready Steady Go! is the third studio album by American singer-songwriter Drake Bell. It marks his third release on an independent record label, and his first for Surfdog Records. The album is Bell's first album in almost eight years, following It's Only Time, which was released in 2006. Originally slated for an early 2013 release, Ready, Steady, Go! was released on April 22, 2014. The lead single, "Bitchcraft", was released on January 28, 2014. The album's promotional single, "I Won't Stand In Your Way", was released on April 17, 2014. "Bull" was a hit in Mexico, peaking at number 8.

The album debuted at No. 182 on the Billboard 200 (week 1), No. 50 on the Billboard Top Rock Albums and No. 32 on the Billboard Top Independent Albums charts. Ready, Steady, Go! sold 2,000 copies in its first week of release. Bell covered songs from artists such as The Move, Billy Joel, Queen, The Kinks, Stray Cats, and Cask Mouse.

Ready Steady Go! mostly had positive reviews by critics, getting 4 out of 5 by AllMusic. Brian Setzer, from the rockabilly band Stray Cats and the guitarist and bandleader of the Brian Setzer Orchestra, executive produced this album.

"Bitchcraft" was remixed by French electro swing band Caravan Palace.

== Release ==
On release, Bell did interviews for KTLA, Perez Hilton, Good Day L.A., Entertainment Tonight and many other media outlets.

On the night of the album's release party, Justin Bieber reportedly tried to crash the party, which also drew attention to the album. On the same night, Bell performed tracks from the album, and a Drake & Josh reunion of cast members took place, with Miranda Cosgrove, Josh Peck, Dan Schneider (the creator of the show), and Jonathan Goldstein, showing up.

The album was released on the independent label, Surfdog Records. Originally, it was supposed to be released in early 2013, but the album was held back and released on April 22, 2014.

Bell has described this as his dream album, working with his childhood guitar hero, Brian Setzer, and having Setzer executive produce and also play on the album.

The album is notable as having been recorded live, with no autotune, no computer enhancements and no use of a click track.

"Bitchcraft", the lead single of the album, was released on January 28, 2014. "I Won't Stand In Your Way" is the promotional single of the album. It was released on April 17, 2014. It is a cover of the Stray Cats original.

The official music video for the lead single, "Bitchcraft", was released on Drake Bell's official YouTube channel on April 17, 2014, 5 days before the release of the album. The music video has received 5.5 million views.

== Tour ==
Bell took part in the High School Nation Tour in support of Ready Steady Go!, touring high schools all around the U.S. The tour lasted from September 16, 2014, to October 22, 2014. It began in Los Angeles, California, and ended in Charlotte, North Carolina. Bell is also touring the United States in a tour dubbed "The Ready Steady Go! Tour" in locations such as No Vacancy in Los Angeles, Spring Freaks in Anaheim, California, Ohio, California, and many other locations in 2015, and plans to continue the tour in 2016 after several sold-out concerts in Mexico.

== Critical reception ==
Professional ratings
Review scores
Source	Rating
Allmusic	4/5 stars
Alter The Press! Review	3.5/5 stars
Blast Out Your Stereo	5/5 stars
Fortitude Magazine	3/5 stars

The album received generally positive reviews, with critics praising Bell's performance and direction for the album. AllMusic wrote in its review of Ready Steady Go!, "Here, Bell sets his charming, resonant vocals to a mix of smartly written originals ("Bitchcraft") and surprisingly well-curated cover songs (the Move's "California Man"). Ultimately, on Ready Steady Go!, Bell is never anything but totally believable, likable, and ready to rock." In the Alter The Press! review of the album, Tori Mier wrote, "In his third studio album, Drake Bell shows an undeniable amount of capability as a musician, drawing from nearly all genres and eras of music to create his own unique sound."

== Commercial performance ==
The album debuted and peaked at No. 182 on the Billboard 200, No. 50 on the Billboard Top Rock Albums and No. 32 on the Billboard Top Independent Albums charts. Ready, Steady, Go! sold 2,000 copies in its first week of release.

== Track listing ==
No.	Title	Writer(s)	Length
1.	"Sunny Afternoon" (The Kinks cover)	Ray Davies	3:21
2.	"Bull" (Cask Mouse cover)	Mitchell Belch, Kevin Boldwin, Jonathan Howes, Edward Llerena, Bonnie Parks, Joseph Wyatt	2:38
3.	"I Won't Stand in Your Way" (featuring Brian Setzer) (Stray Cats cover)	Brian Setzer	4:06
4.	"Bitchcraft" (featuring Brian Setzer)	Jared Drake Bell, Brett Boyett	3:00
5.	"Runaway Boys" (Stray Cats cover)	Setzer, James McDonnell	3:05
6.	"Makes Me Happy" (new version)	Bell, Christopher Jonathan Abraham, Michael Thomas Corcoran	2:51
7.	"It's Still Rock and Roll to Me" (Billy Joel cover)	Billy Joel	2:56
8.	"Melina"	Adam Traub	3:18
9.	"Crazy Little Thing Called Love" (Queen cover)	Freddie Mercury	2:57
10.	"California Man" (The Move cover)	Roy Wood	3:07
11.	"Back of My Hand" (The Jags cover)	John Adler, Nicholas Watkinson	3:20
12.	"Give Me a Little More Time"	Bell, Daniel Kalisher, Will Herrington	3:55
Total length:			38:34

== Personnel ==
As listed in the album's booklet.

- Vocals, Electric Guitars, Acoustic guitars, B3 Organ – Drake Bell
- Executive Producer and Electric guitars – Brian Setzer
- Producer – Peter Collins
- Drums – Chad Cromwell
- Bass – Dominic Davis
- Slap Bass – Joe Fick
- Additional Electric Guitars – Rob Bourassa, Ronnie Crutcher, Chris Pelcer
- Additional Acoustic Guitars – Rob Bourassa
- Piano – Jody Nardone
- Fiddle – Tim Hayes
- Baritone and Tenor Sax – Mark Douhit
- Gang Vocals – Chris Pelcer, Julian Sammut
- Backing Vocals – Paula Bowman, Lee Bowman, Joey Nardone
- Vocal Arrangements – Rob Bourassa and Chris Pelcer

== Charts ==
Ready Steady Go! is Bell's second album to chart on the Billboard 200. The album sold over 2,000 copies in its first week of release and debuted and peaked at No. 182 on the Billboard 200. It also debuted in the top five in Mexico.

Chart performance for Ready Steady Go!
Chart (2014)	Peak position
Mexican Albums (Top 100 Mexico)	5
US Billboard 200	182
US Top Rock & Alternative Albums (Billboard)	50
US Independent Albums (Billboard)	32
