= Telegraph (album) =

Studio album by Drake Bell
- Released: August 23, 2005; August 7, 2007 (re-release)
- Recorded: 2003–2004
- Genre: Pop rock; power pop
- Length: 40:33
- Label: Nine Yards, Backhouse
- Producer: Drake Bell, Michael Corcoran

Drake Bell chronology
Drake & Josh (2005)	Telegraph (2005)	It's Only Time (2006)

Telegraph is the debut studio album by singer-songwriter Drake Bell, released on August 23, 2005, on Nine Yards Records. It was recorded by Bell and producer Michael Corcoran, as well as a few friends in a simple home studio using a Digidesign Digi 002.

The album was released on August 23, 2005, and was issued by Michael Corcoran's label Backhouse Records and the now defunct label Nine Yards Records. Being an independently released production, it ran out of print, and was subsequently re-released on August 7, 2007. It released on Vinyl for the first time in 2025 to celebrate the albums 20th anniversary.

== Critical reception ==
Professional ratings
Review scores
Source	Rating
AllMusic	4/5 stars
Ultimate Guitar	4.5/5 stars

Telegraph received critical acclaim for its dark tone and Bell's songwriting. AllMusic wrote in its review of the album, "He specializes in upbeat, McCartneyesque ditties fleshed out with enchanting harmony vocals and big, wet production." A writer for Ultimate Guitar Archive praised Bell's vocals on the album, writing "his voice is pleasantly raspy and there's always a sense of unapologetic know-how in his delivery, without the bratty pseudo-punk attitude that litters many a radio station".

== Track listing ==
No.	Title	Writer(s)	Length
1.	"Intro"	Drake Bell	0:27
2.	"Found a Way"	Bell, Michael Corcoran	3:02
3.	"Circles"	Bell	4:06
4.	"Somehow"	Bell, Corcoran	4:40
5.	"In the End"	Bell, Corcoran	4:24
6.	"Don't Preach"	C.J. Abraham, Bell, Corcoran	3:24
7.	"Hollywood Girl"	Bell, Corcoran, G. Petersen	2:53
8.	"Golden Days"	Bell, D. Tashian, G. Garner	3:43
9.	"Down We Fall"	Bell, Corcoran	5:50
10.	"The Backhouse"	Bell	0:19
11.	"Highway to Nowhere"	Bell, S.W. Bennett, M. Shallman	4:04
12.	"Telegraph"	Bell, Corcoran	3:39
Total length:			40:33

== Additional song information ==
- "Hollywood Girl" was performed on TRL in the TV movie Drake & Josh Go Hollywood.
- Part of "Don't Preach" is also featured in Drake & Josh Go Hollywood, in which Drake Bell stars. The scene shows him (as Drake Parker) performing the song at the B'nai Shalom Home for the Elderly with his band. It is also featured in the episode, "Who's Got Game?"
- "Found a Way", "Down We Fall", and "Highway to Nowhere" are also on the Drake & Josh soundtrack, Drake & Josh: Songs from and inspired by the hit TV show. Drake also played "Highway to Nowhere" when he guest-starred on the Nickelodeon TV show Zoey 101. In the episode, the students of Pacific Coast Academy hire Drake to play at their school's Spring Fling. He also played "Circles" when he guest-starred on the Nickelodeon TV show All That.
- The beatboxing on the song "Circles" is done by Josh Peck, Drake's co-star on Drake & Josh.
- In March 2024, Bell revealed on TikTok that the song "In the End" was written after he was sexually abused by Brian Peck, and inspired by said abuse.
- In April 2024, Bell also revealed on TikTok that the song "Somehow" was also inspired by his abuse by Peck, though he flipped it to the perspective of a girl, effectively creating a fictionalised variation of a real concept.

== Personnel ==
As listed on Drake Bell's website.

- Drake Bell – lead and backing vocals, rhythm guitars, keyboards
- Backhouse Mike – bass guitar, lead and rhythm guitar, keyboards, backing vocals
- Joey Finger – drums
- Tom Kinne – bass guitar
- Scott Bennett – bass guitar, drums, guitar, keyboards
- DJ Eroc – scratching
- Mike D'Santi – guitar
- Josh Peck – beatboxing (track 3)
