= Nancy Sullivan (American actress) =

American actress

- Occupations: Actress; comedian
- Years active: 1983–2018

External image
- Nancy Sullivan IMDb photo

Nancy Sullivan is an American retired actress and comedian, who is best known for her role as Audrey Parker-Nichols on the Nickelodeon sitcom Drake & Josh.

== Career ==
Before she became an actress, Sullivan received improvisation training as a member of The Groundlings in San Jose. She studied acting and dance at the University of Utah. Her role models are Lucille Ball, Tracey Ullman, and Carol Burnett. She rose to fame for playing Audrey Parker-Nichols in the hit Nickelodeon sitcom Drake & Josh. On The Amanda Show, she played various characters such as Marcy Stimple, Mrs. Klutz, Ms. DeBoat, and other various teachers, as well as adult defendants in "Judge Trudy" and customers for "Blockblister" and "...Dooper" sketches.

Sullivan has also appeared in many commercials including Price Chopper supermarket chain and the Consumer Cellular wireless carrier.

== Filmography ==
=== Film ===
Year	Title	Role	Notes
1993	Boiling Point	Clerk	
1995	Guns and Lipstick	Customer Service Officer	
1997	The Setting Sun	Sherry (Palm Reader)	
2013	Abner, The Invisible Dog	Jackie	
2017	Monster Island	Dina, Old Lady, Teacher (voices)	

=== Television ===
Year	Title	Role	Notes
1984	Single Bars, Single Women	Sister	Television film
1986–1990	Pee-wee’s Playhouse	Friend of Pee-wee	Ensemble comedy cast with The Groundlings
1994–1995	The Newz	Various Characters/Herself	61 episodes
1994	Melrose Place	Floor Nurse	2 episodes
1999–2002	The Amanda Show	Various Characters/Herself	26 episodes
2000	Double Dare 2000	Herself	Along with the cast of The Amanda Show
2004–2007	Drake & Josh	Audrey Parker-Nichols	55 episodes
2005	Zoey 101	Mr. Bender's Wife	1 episode
2006	Drake & Josh Go Hollywood	Audrey Parker-Nichols	Television film
2006–2007	Squirrel Boy	Ms. Johnson, Ballet Turtle, Kid #1 (voices)	14 episodes
2007	Drake & Josh: Really Big Shrimp	Audrey Parker-Nichols	Television special
2008	Merry Christmas, Drake & Josh	Audrey Parker-Nichols	Television film

=== Video games ===
Year	Title	Role	Notes
2016	World of Final Fantasy	Serafie	

=== Bibliography ===
- Threat of Exposure (2002)
