= Drake & Josh: Talent Showdown =

2007 video game

- Developer: Artificial Mind & Movement
- Publisher: THQ
- Platform: Nintendo DS
- Release: NA: July 30, 2007
- Genre: Action-adventure
- Mode: Single player

Drake & Josh: Talent Showdown is a 2007 action-adventure game for the Nintendo DS. It is the second and last video game based on the Nickelodeon sitcom Drake & Josh.

== Plot ==
Drake and Josh win the infamous talent show, Teen American Talent, by avoiding sabotage from other contestants and by perfecting their music. The game allows the player to interact with characters from the TV show, including Drake, Josh and Megan.

== Reception ==
Reception

Aggregate score
Aggregator	Score
Metacritic	43/100

Review scores
Publication	Score
GameZone	3.2/10
IGN	3.5/10
Nintendo World Report	7.5/10
Nintendo Gamer	25/100

Drake & Josh: Talent Showdown received "generally unfavourable" reviews according to Metacritic, earning an aggregated score of 43/100.

Nintendo Gamer called it an "awful mess of a game", giving it a score of 25/100. IGN similarly panned the game, stating that it "doesn't respect the source material", criticized the "monotony" of the audio and visuals, and savaging the game overall as "one simple fetch quest, repeated dozens of times", ultimately giving the game a score of 3.5/10.
