= Drake & Josh (video game) =

2007 video game

- Developer: Artificial Mind and Movement
- Publisher: THQ
- Platform: Game Boy Advance
- Release: NA: March 13, 2007
- Genre: Action-adventure
- Mode: Single-player

Drake & Josh is a video game based on Nickelodeon's sitcom of the same name, developed by Artificial Mind and Movement and published by THQ for the Game Boy Advance (GBA).

== Gameplay ==
The player controls Drake and Josh in a variety of modes featuring problem solving, stealth, strategy and action-style gameplay. The game uses a password feature to save progress.

== Reception ==
Gabe Boker of GameZone rated the game 7 out of 10, and wrote, "The visuals and audio are surprisingly quite good. Sure, you won't really be able to make out the characters, but the environments are appealing and fit the theme of the show." However, Boker criticized the game's difficulty: "Levels not only have a ludicrous amount of obstacles, but stages possess strenuous time limits that render things a tad on the stressful side, even for experienced gamers." Boker concluded, "Its presentation does its TV counterpart justice, and its stealth/action/puzzle gameplay offers a much-needed changeup from what we're used to seeing from Nickelodeon-licensed software."

Jonathan Metts of Nintendo World Report rated the game 4.5 out of 10, and criticized its password function, an outdated feature that had become obscure for most video games by that time. Metts wrote that the password feature "isn't a huge problem overall", but that "it is a good indication of how little effort was put into the production of this game. Drake & Josh reeks of the kind of situation where a developer has an established game engine and a generic game design sitting around, and a big name publisher comes along proposing to slap licensed characters onto that framework." Metts wrote that Drake's levels "have strict time limits and can be very frustrating," while Josh's levels "are much more fun, though probably too difficult for this game's target audience". Metts noted the "overly complicated controls and zero fun" of the mini-games, and criticized the fact that the player must enter a password to replay a mini-game. Metts concluded, "Drake & Josh is yet another mediocre licensed GBA game with awful production values and occasional flashes of quality buried too deep to be worth your consideration."
