= Superhero Movie =

2008 film by Craig Mazin

- Theatrical release poster
- Directed by: Craig Mazin
- Written by: Craig Mazin
- Produced by: Craig Mazin; Robert K. Weiss; David Zucker
- Starring: Drake Bell; Sara Paxton; Christopher McDonald; Kevin Hart; Brent Spiner; Jeffrey Tambor; Robert Joy; Regina Hall; Pamela Anderson; Leslie Nielsen; Marion Ross
- Cinematography: Thomas E. Ackerman
- Edited by: Andrew S. Eisen; Craig Herring; Daniel Schalk
- Music by: James L. Venable
- Production companies: Dimension Films; Craig Mazin Company
- Distributed by: MGM Distribution Co.
- Release date: March 28, 2008
- Running time: 86 minutes
- Country: United States
- Language: English
- Budget: $35 million
- Box office: $73 million

Superhero Movie is a 2008 American parody film written and directed by Craig Mazin, produced by Mazin, Robert K. Weiss and David Zucker, and starring Drake Bell, Sara Paxton, Christopher McDonald and Leslie Nielsen. The film follows a socially awkward teenager who becomes a Spider-Man-like masked vigilante with superpowers after being bitten by a radioactive dragonfly, and must use his new abilities to stop a villainous businessman from harvesting the life force of others.

A spoof of the 2000s superhero film genre, primarily Sam Raimi's Spider-Man (2002) and Christopher Nolan's Batman Begins (2005), it also parodies other 2000s superhero films such as X-Men (2000) and Fantastic Four (2005). The film draws inspiration from the Scary Movie series, with which the film's poster shares a resemblance. It was also inspired by, and contains homages to some of Zucker, Abrahams and Zucker's earlier spoof films such as Airplane! (1980) and the Naked Gun trilogy (1988, 1991 and 1994 respectively). In the case of the former, the film was originally titled Superhero! as a nod to Airplane!, in which Nielsen also starred.

Production began on September 17, 2007, in Los Angeles. It was released by MGM Distribution Co. on March 28, 2008, in the United States to negative critical reviews, but grossed $73 million against a $35 million budget. The film has made a loyal cult following in the parody genre.

== Plot ==
Rick Riker is an unpopular and unlucky student at Empire High School. He lives with his Uncle Albert and Aunt Lucille, and his best friend, Trey. Rick has a crush on Jill Johnson, but she is dating bully Lance Landers. One day, Rick's class goes on a school field trip to an animal research lab run by terminally ill businessman Lou Landers, Lance's uncle. During the trip, Rick accidentally saturates himself in animal-attraction liquid, which causes a group of animals to flock to him, including a chemically enhanced radioactive dragonfly, which bites his neck.

Meanwhile, Lou creates a machine designed to heal illness. Testing it on himself, he gains perfect health at the cost of needing to drain life energy from a victim per day. To avoid arrest for murder, Lou becomes the villain Hourglass. During a science fair, Rick's body changes, which creates a number of mishaps. He later realizes that he has developed superpowers from the dragonfly bite. Rick reveals his secret to his uncle and Trey, and an argument starts between him and Albert. The next day, while visiting the bank with Lucille, Rick accidentally allows a bank robber to make off with stolen cash. The robber then shoots and injures Albert.

Charles Xavier contacts Rick and introduces his school for mutants, where Mrs. Xavier tells him to make a costume to be a superhero. At home, Rick creates a superhero costume and dubs himself "the Dragonfly". The Dragonfly starts watching over the city and fighting crime, quickly becoming a media sensation despite being unable to fly. Later, Dragonfly attempts to stop Hourglass from robbing a warehouse full of "ceryllium" as part of his evil plan but fails, allowing Hourglass to escape.

Later that night, Jill is attacked by thieves, but the Dragonfly saves her and they share a kiss. Meanwhile, Lou plans to construct a machine that will kill people and give him enough life energy to make him immortal. Later that night, Lou and Lance have dinner with Rick's family and Jill, but Lou secretly learns of Rick's true identity when he notices the same injuries on Rick as on the Dragonfly. Making up an awkward excuse, he and Lance leave. Lou returns minutes later as Hourglass and kills Aunt Lucille. Albert awakens from his coma and learns about her death from his moronic doctor. After her funeral, Jill meets Rick and offers to begin a relationship with him. However, Rick fears for her safety, and rejects Jill, leaving her hurt and furious.

Rick decides to end his superhero career, but knowing that Hourglass would head to an awards ceremony to kill thousands of people, he gets Albert to take him there. At the ceremony, Lou tells Rick the Dalai Lama is Hourglass, causing chaos. Meanwhile, Jill discovers that Lou is Hourglass. When Hourglass clashes with Dragonfly on a rooftop, he activates his machine. Dragonfly manages to destroy both the machine and the Hourglass with his own bomb.

The explosion throws Jill off the roof and the Dragonfly dives after her, eventually growing wings and flies. Jill learns that Rick is the Dragonfly due to a family ring he wears being exposed through a hole in his glove and the two begin a relationship. After being thanked for saving the city, Rick flies away with Jill, but the two are unexpectedly rammed by a passing helicopter.

== Cast ==
- Drake Bell as Rick Riker / Dragonfly
- Sara Paxton as Jill Johnson
- Christopher McDonald as Lou Landers / Hourglass
- Leslie Nielsen as Albert Adams
- Marion Ross as Lucille Adams
- Kevin Hart as Trey
- Ryan Hansen as Lance Landers

Guest appearances

- Pamela Anderson as Invisible Girl
- Tracy Morgan as Professor Xavier
- Regina Hall as Mrs. Xavier
- Robert Joy as Stephen Hawking
- Robert Hays as Blaine Riker
- Nicole Sullivan as Julia Riker
- Simon Rex as Human Torch
- Marisa Lauren as Storm
- Richard Tillman as Wolverine
- Craig Bierko as Wolverine (credits only)
- Howard Mungo as Nelson Mandela
- Aki Aleong as the Dalai Lama
- Sean Simms as Barry Bonds
- Freddie Pierce as Tony Bennett
- David McKnight as Desmond Tutu
- Miles Fisher as Tom Cruise
- John Getz as Lunatic Editor
- Brent Spiner as Dr. Strom
- Jeffrey Tambor as Dr. Whitby
- Dan Castellaneta as Carlson
- Keith David as Karlin
- Charlene Tilton as Mrs. Johnson
- Kurt Fuller as Mr. Thompson
- Lil' Kim as Xavier's daughter
- Cameron Ali Sims as Xavier's son
- Marque Richardson as Xavier's oldest son

== Production ==
The film was initially slated for theatrical release on February 9, 2007, as Superhero! under the direction of David Zucker. After being delayed, the film began production on September 17, 2007, in New York, and the director's chair was shifted to Craig Mazin, with Zucker being pushed back to being a producer. Though the film was produced in New York, the flyover scenes used as transitions in the film use footage of the business district in downtown Kansas City, Missouri.

Zucker said the film primarily parodied Spider-Man and Batman Begins, but also spoofed X-Men, Fantastic Four, and Superman. The producer elaborated, "It's a spoof of the whole superhero genre, but this one probably has more of a unified plot, like The Naked Gun had." The film also makes fun of certain celebrities and their real-life actions, such as Tom Cruise's Scientology video and Barry Bonds' alleged use of steroids. It also makes fun of British scientist Stephen Hawking.

== Release ==
=== Box office ===
On its opening weekend, the film grossed $9,510,297 in 2,960 theaters, averaging to about $3,212 per venue, and ranked No. 3 at the box office. It grossed $26,638,520 in North America, and $46,387,782 internationally for a total of $73,026,302 in worldwide box office receipts.

=== Critical response ===
On Rotten Tomatoes, the film has an approval percentage of 17% based on 48 reviews, with the critics consensus reading: "Superhero Movie is not the worst of the spoof genre, but relies on tired gags and lame pop culture references all the same." On Metacritic, the film has a score of 33 out of 100 based on 14 critic reviews, meaning "Generally Unfavorable". Audiences polled by CinemaScore gave the film an average grade of "C+" on an A+ to F scale.

It was considered an improvement over Meet the Spartans. Luke Y. Thompson of L.A. Weekly compared it to Mazin's first film, The Specials, saying it was "everything his first film wasn't: predictable, flat, full of name-dropping, tragically unhip, and likely to make a decent amount of cash".

=== Home media ===
Superhero Movie was released on DVD on July 8, 2008. It was released in the rated PG-13 theatrical version (75 minutes) and the extended edition (81 minutes). The extended DVD features an audio commentary by Zucker, Weiss, and Mazin, deleted scenes, and an alternate ending. There is also a Blockbuster Exclusive version of the film which is the PG-13 version with the bonus features from the unrated version and even more deleted scenes. The European (Region 2) DVD has a 15 certificate and has all the features of the extended region 1 version.

== Music ==
Sara Paxton performed the song heard during the credits, titled "I Need A Hero", which she also wrote with Michael Jay and Johnny Pedersen.

=== Superhero! Song ===
"Superhero! Song"

Promotional single by Drake Bell
- Released: April 8, 2008 (Digital download)
- Recorded: 2007–2008
- Genre: Pop rock
- Length: 3:14
- Label: Universal Republic
- Songwriters: Drake Bell; Michael Corcoran
- Producer: Backhouse Mike

Star of the film Drake Bell composed (along with Michael Corcoran) and recorded a song for the movie entitled "Superhero! Song" during the movie's post-production. Co-star Sara Paxton provided backup vocals for the song. This song can be heard in the credits of the movie, however it is credited as being titled "Superbounce". It originally appeared on Bell's Myspace Music page. It was released in iTunes Store as a digital downloadable single on April 8, 2008.
