= L.A. Slasher =

2015 film directed by Martin Owen

- Theatrical release poster
- Directed by: Martin Owen
- Screenplay by: Martin Owen
- Story by: Abigail Wright; Elizabeth Morris; Tim Burke
- Produced by: Daniel Sollinger; Shree Patel; Jonathan Willis; Abigail Wright; Martin Owen; Jeffrey Wright
- Starring: Mischa Barton; Eric Roberts; Dave Bautista; Drake Bell; Brooke Hogan; Abigail Wright; Elizabeth Morris; Korrina Rico; Tori Black; Frank Collison; Marisa Laurén; Danny Trejo
- Cinematography: Chase Bowman
- Edited by: Emanuele Giraldo; Keith Croket
- Music by: Mac Quayle
- Production companies: JWright Productions; The Ideas Factory
- Distributed by: Archstone Distribution
- Release date: June 26, 2015
- Running time: 85 minutes
- Country: United States
- Language: English
- Budget: $10,000
- Box office: $2,421

L.A. Slasher is a 2015 American comedy slasher film co-written and directed by Martin Owen. The film stars Andy Dick, Drake Bell, Mischa Barton, and Dave Bautista. The film was released on June 26, 2015, in a limited release by Arthur Jones.

== Plot ==
Los Angeles learns that the city's minor celebrities are being stalked when The Reality Star is found wandering the Hollywood hills wrapped in bloodied bandages. The self-proclaimed pop culture obsessed L.A. Slasher, a masked killer with a burning hatred for reality TV, begins abducting and torturing various stars while amassing a large cult following that monitors his activities as he posts videos online.

The Slasher stalks The Heiress as she dines with her friend The Socialite. After picking up a stash of cocaine from a pair of Drug Dealers in a cheap motel room, The Heiress is grounded by her parents for embarrassing herself while high at a family dinner. The Slasher abducts The Heiress from her room and later kidnaps The Socialite, as well.

As the kidnappings and torture continue, the citizens of Los Angeles are interviewed about the actions of the Slasher; most people generally do not care and feel that society is better off without them.

While The Actress hosts a party attended by her friend The Stripper, The Slasher nearly drowns The Teen Mom in a pool before abducting her. The Slasher releases video of the captive Heiress, prompting her parents to beg for her release on TV.

The Mayor publicly decries The Slasher's actions. The Slasher then forcibly kidnaps him after The Mayor has a drunken sexual encounter with two women in a car outside a sleazy bar.

After taking a drive with The Actress, The Stripper ends up abducted by The Slasher. Meanwhile, The Producer plans on making a horror movie based on the crimes and The Slasher kidnaps him, too.

Holding his victims captive, The Slasher forces everyone to perform humiliating auditions that he posts online for his followers' entertainment. The Teen Mom is killed on camera with an ax while dressed as Marilyn Monroe.

The Slasher cuts off The Socialite's fingers. He then briefly attends a group therapy session at a Killers Anonymous meeting, but leaves before participating. The Slasher next abducts The Popstar at a boxing gym. After getting a haircut, The Slasher attacks The Heiress back at his lair. The Slasher then kidnaps The Actress while she searches for her missing stripper friend.

The Slasher releases The Stripper in order to play a cat and mouse game. The Stripper escapes to an abandoned gas station with online-enabled cameras, but no one watching at home responds to her cries for help. The Slasher continues chasing The Stripper through the desert before finally running her over with his van.

The Drug Dealers come to the desert looking for the location of an underground drug lab. One of the Drug Dealers reveals himself to be an Undercover Cop after calling in the discovery of The Stripper's body lying in the sand. The other Drug Dealer shoots the Undercover Cop, but The Slasher then kills the Drug Dealer with a machete.

The Slasher loads up his van with the remaining hostages and drives into the city. He meets The Reporter who has been covering his crimes for local newscasts and they kiss because she "understands him".

The police arrive at The Slasher's desert lair with an ambulance. They discover The Mayor being held captive and forced to watch recordings of disgraced politicians making public apologies. The police also rescue The Actress.

After making his escape with The Reporter, The Slasher uses a remote control to unlock the back doors of his van. The Producer, The Popstar, The Heiress, and The Socialite go free.

== Cast ==
- Mischa Barton as The Actress
- Dave Bautista as The Drug Dealer #1
- Andy Dick as The Slasher (voice)
- Eric Roberts as The Mayor
- Danny Trejo as The Drug Dealer #2
- Abigail Wright as The Reporter
- Frank Collison as Killers Anonymous Leader
- Marisa Lauren as The Stripper
- Drake Bell as The Popstar
- Elizabeth Morris as The Heiress
- Tim Burke as The Producer
- Tori Black as The Teen Mom
- Brooke Hogan as The Reality Star
- Korrina Rico as The Socialite
- Andrew de Burgh as The Waiter

== Marketing ==
A theatrical trailer was released on September 24, 2014. On June 24, 2015, the official theatrical poster was released.

== Release ==
On February 9, 2015, Archstone Distribution had acquired all North American distribution rights to the film and planned to release the film through AMC Theatres in 2015. The film was released in a limited release on June 26, 2015, with December 1, 2015 DVD and December 8, 2015 VOD releases to follow.

== Reception ==
On Rotten Tomatoes, 0% of six critic reviews are positive, with an average rating of 1.9 out of 10. Camilla Jackson of Fangoria gave it a positive review of 3 out of 4 stars, describing it as a "colorful feast for the eyes." Clayton Dillard of Slant Magazine gave the film one-and-a-half stars out of four stars and wrote, "It [the film] inflates the meta conceit (already borderline overblown) of a pop-obsessed, sex-negative serial killer to excessive but trite proportions." Martin Tsai of the Los Angeles Times called the film "vile" and "worthless", writing that it "actively wishes harm" on the subjects of its criticism.
