= Terrific (song) =

Single by Drake Bell

from the album A Reminder
- Released: June 14, 2011
- Recorded: 2010/2011
- Genre: Alternative rock
- Length: 3:22
- Label: Drake Bell Entertainment Inc.
- Songwriter(s): Drake Bell; Sondre Lerche
- Producer(s): John Fields

Drake Bell singles chronology
"Leave It All to Me" (2007)	"Terrific" (2011)	"Christmas Promise" (2013)

"Terrific" is a song by the singer-songwriter Drake Bell, released in 2011 and the only single from his EP, A Reminder. It was the first song he had released since 2008, and the first not to be co-written with either Michael Corcoran or C.J. Abraham. Though the song did not chart in the U.S., it debuted at number 1 on Mexico's charts. A music video was released on YouTube.
