= I Know (Drake Bell song) =

Single by Drake Bell

from the album It's Only Time
- Released: October 17, 2006 (CD single); November 21, 2006 (Digital download)
- Recorded: 2006
- Genre: Pop rock
- Length: 3:47
- Label: Universal Motown
- Songwriters: C.J. Abraham; Drake Bell; Michael Corcoran
- Producer: Backhouse Mike

Drake Bell singles chronology
| "I Know" (2006) | "Makes Me Happy" (2007) |

"I Know" is the debut single by pop rock musician Drake Bell and is the first single off his second album, It's Only Time. It was released on October 17, 2006 in the United States, and as a digital download on November 21, 2006. The video for "I Know" premiered on MTV's TRL on November 9, 2006. It peaked at No. 55 on the Mediabase Charts with 295 spins. He performed this song on MTV's TRL on December 6, 2006.

== Track listing ==
- U.S. promo CD 21747-2

| No. | Title | Writer(s) | Length |
|---|---|---|---|
| 1. | "I Know" | Drake Bell, C.J. Abraham, Michael Corcoran | 3:47 |

== Music video ==
The video depicts a famous musician (played by Bell) who seduces and flatters young women, which is intended to make his supposed girlfriend (played by Melissa Lingafelt) angry and jealous. She is meanwhile falling in love with an unpopular musician, who happens to be Bell himself. Bell is seen throughout the video singing the song, joined by his band, while playing a grand piano. In the end, the girl finds him.

The music video for "I Know" has received over 45 million views on YouTube.

== Personnel ==
- Drake Bell – vocals, guitar
- Backhouse Mike – bass, guitar, keyboards, percussion, backing vocals
- Joe Travers – drums
- C.J. Abraham – backing vocals
- Alyssa Griffith – backing vocals
- Rob Jacobs – mixing

== Release history ==
Release dates and formats for "I Know"
| Region | Date | Format | Label(s) | Ref. |
|---|---|---|---|---|
| United States | October 16, 2006 | Mainstream airplay | Universal Motown | |
