= Alec Medlock =

American actor

- Born: March 13, 1990 (age 36); Torrance, California, U.S.
- Education: University of California, Los Angeles (BA); University of California, Berkeley (JD)
- Occupations: Actor; attorney
- Years active: 2000–2013 (acting)
- Children: 1

Alec Medlock (born March 13, 1990) is an American corporate attorney and former actor. He is best known for playing Craig Ramirez on the Nickelodeon series Drake & Josh from 2004 to 2007, reprising the character in the 2008 movie Merry Christmas, Drake & Josh and in a 2010 episode of the series iCarly.

He currently works as an associate for Cooley LLP.

== Career ==
Medlock first appeared in the 2000 short film Les soldates. He provided the voice of Littlefoot in The Land Before Time X: The Great Longneck Migration. From 2004 to 2007, he had a recurring role as Craig on Drake & Josh. He reprised his role in the iCarly episode "iStart a Fan War".

== Personal life ==
Alec Medlock is fluent in English, French and Mandarin Chinese.

From 2010 to 2020, he tutored at The Princeton Review. From 2020 to 2023, he studied law at the UC Berkeley School of Law.

Medlock is married and has one child.

== Filmography ==
Year	Title	Role	Notes
2000	Les soldates	André	
2001	Dennis	Dennis	
2001	Family Law	Darren Perliss	Episode: "Sacrifices"
2001	Danny		Episode: "Algebra 1"
2003	The United States of Leland	12-year-old Leland	
2003	The Long Ride Home	Daniel Fowler	Episode: "Trading Places"
2003	Judging Amy	Greg Goodman	Episode: "Tricks of the Trade"
2003	The Land Before Time X: The Great Longneck Migration	Littlefoot	Voice
2004	Cold Case	Dominic LaSalle	Episode: "The Plan"
2004	The Man in the Moon	Joseph	
2004	7th Heaven	Bart	2 episodes
2005	Dinotopia: Quest for the Ruby Sunstone	Kex Bradley	Voice
2003–2006	Malcolm in the Middle		2 episodes
2007	Insatiable	Buddy	Episode: "Pilot"
2007	Surf's Up		Voice
2007	State of Mind	Bryce	2 episodes
2004–2007	Drake & Josh	Craig Ramirez	13 episodes
2008	Merry Christmas, Drake & Josh	Craig Ramirez	
2009	Warehouse 13	Bobby Busecki	Episode: "Nevermore"
2009	Star Wars: The Clone Wars	Wag Too	Voice (2 episodes)
2009	How I Met Your Mother	Waiter	Episode: "The Window"
2010	iCarly	Craig Ramirez	Episode: "iStart a Fan War"
2012	Baby Daddy	Dave	Episode: "Something Borrowed, Something Ben"
2013	Grey's Anatomy	Kid	Episode: "This Is Why We Fight"
2013	Touch	Nicole's Assistant	Episode: "Accused"
