= A Reminder =

EP by Drake Bell
- Released: June 28, 2011
- Recorded: 2010–11
- Genre: Pop rock; indie pop; alternative rock; pop
- Length: 14:02
- Label: Drake Bell Entertainment, Inc.
- Producer: John Fields; Bleu

Drake Bell chronology
Drake Bell in Concert (2008)	A Reminder (2011)	Ready Steady Go! (2014)

Singles from A Reminder
- 1. "Terrific" Released: June 14, 2011

A Reminder is the first released extended play by singer-songwriter Drake Bell; The Nashville Sessions, Bell's first extended play, was recorded before Bell's debut album, Telegraph and never officially released. A Reminder was produced by Bell, John Fields and Bleu. The EP contains 4 tracks of new songs performed by Bell around the globe. It also contains his single "Terrific".

== Release and promotion ==
"Terrific", the lead single of the EP, was released on June 14, 2011. Music videos for "Terrific" and "You're Not Thinking" were released on Drake Bell's official YouTube channel in 2011.

== Critical reception ==
Professional ratings
Review scores
Source	Rating
Under The Gun Review	7/10 stars
Musiqtone	4/5 stars

A Reminder received positive reviews from critics. In its review of A Reminder, Under The Gun stated, "To summarize thus, A Reminder is an entertaining miniature collection, with some perfectly timed seasonal treats that ought to go down well for easy listening during the summer. There is evidence of a keener eye and ear in Bell’s approach that may let him stand apart from the rest in his future endeavors, though he has always been better than his teenybopper credentials may imply. A little cheesy perhaps, but a comforting listen."

== Lawsuit ==
In 2011, one of the producers of the EP, John Fields, sued Bell for $36,000. Bell allegedly ordered 9 songs for $9,000 each, but only paid for 5. Only four made it to the ep.

== Track listing ==
All songs written by Drake Bell, except for track four written by Scott Simons.

No.	Title	Length
1.	"Terrific"	3:23
2.	"You're Not Thinking"	3:12
3.	"Big Shot"	3:14
4.	"Speak My Mind"	4:13
Total length:		14:02
