= Makes Me Happy =

2007 single by Drake Bell

Single by Drake Bell

from the album It's Only Time
- Released: October 16, 2007
- Length: 2:07
- Label: Universal Motown
- Songwriters: C. J. Abraham; Drake Bell; Michael Corcoran
- Producers: C. J. Abraham; Backhouse Mike; Drake Bell

Drake Bell singles chronology
"I Know" (2006)	"Makes Me Happy" (2007)	"Leave It All to Me" (2007)

"Makes Me Happy" is a song by American musician and actor, Drake Bell. It was released as the second single from his second studio album, It's Only Time, on October 16, 2007.

The song was used in the Drake & Josh episode "Really Big Shrimp". The song peaked at number 3 on the Billboard Bubbling Under Hot 100 Singles.

In 2014, a rearranged more upbeat, rockabilly-inspired version of the song appears on Bell's third studio album, Ready Steady Go!.

== Track listing ==
- U.S. promo digital download single

No.	Title	Writer(s)	Length
1.	"Makes Me Happy" (Radio Disney Edit)	C. J. Abraham; Drake Bell; Michael Corcoran	2:09

== Personnel ==
- Drake Bell – lead vocals, backing vocals, guitars
- C. J. Abraham – horns
- Brian Burwell – drums
- Michael Corcoran – bass guitar, lead and rhythm guitar, keyboards, percussion, backing vocals
- Rob Jacobs – mixing

== Chart performance ==
The song managed to make the Billboard Bubbling Under Hot 100 Singles chart in August 2007, by debuting at number 3. As a result, the song became Bell's first charting song on any Billboard chart in his career. The song also made a brief appearance on the Billboard Pop 100 chart, peaking at number 67.

=== Weekly charts ===
Chart (2007)	Peak position
US Bubbling Under Hot 100 (Billboard)	3
US Pop 100 (Billboard)	67
