= Drake Bell =

American actor (born 1986)

- Bell in 2026
- Born: Jared Drake Bell; June 27, 1986 (age 40); Fountain Valley, California, U.S.
- Education: Orange County School of the Arts
- Occupations: Actor; musician
- Years active: 1991–present
- Children: 1
- Mother: Robin Bell Dodson
- Relatives: Heath Bell (cousin)
- Musical career
- Genres: Pop rock; power pop; rockabilly; rock and roll
- Instruments: Vocals; guitar; piano
- Labels: dB Records (current); Surfdog; Nine Yards; Backhouse; Universal Motown; Nick (former)
- Website: www.drakebell.co

Signature
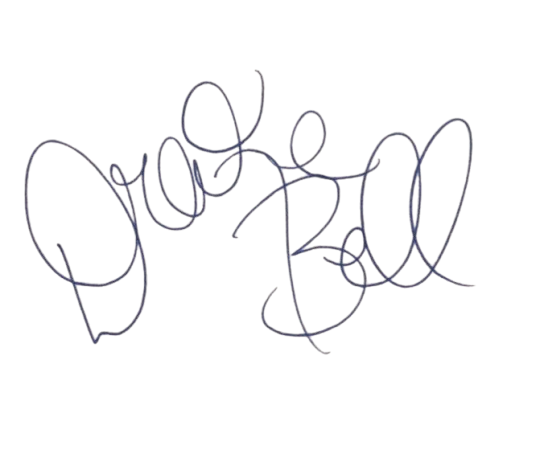

Jared Drake Bell (born June 27, 1986) is an American actor and musician. Born in Newport Beach, California, he began his career as a child actor in the 1990s, appearing on Home Improvement (1994) and in several commercials. He rose to prominence with Nickelodeon, playing starring roles in the sketch comedy series The Amanda Show (1999–2002), the sitcom Drake & Josh (2004–2007), and the Nickelodeon television film series The Fairly OddParents (2011–2014). He also voiced Peter Parker / Spider-Man on the Disney XD series Ultimate Spider-Man (2012–2017) and various Disney XD media. He has won ten Kids' Choice Awards, a Teen Choice Award, and a Young Artist Award, among other accolades.

Bell began his musical career contributing to the soundtrack of Drake & Josh. He independently released his debut studio album, Telegraph (2005), and signed with Universal Motown Records in 2006. His second studio album, It's Only Time (2006), emerged as a commercial success. His third album, Ready Steady Go! (2014), was released through the independent record label Surfdog Records. He has since released two independent albums: The Lost Album (2020) and Non-Stop Flight (2024).

== Early life ==
Bell was born on June 27, 1986, in Orange County, California. He is the youngest of four children from former professional billiards player Robin Dodson, and swimming pool service technician Joe Bell. Through his father's family, Bell is the cousin of former San Diego Padres relief pitcher Heath Bell.

His parents divorced when he was five years old. While growing up in Orange County, Bell attended the Orange County School of the Arts and skateboarded while regularly attending punk rock concerts, the music of which he cites as an influence. He received a GED.

== Career ==
=== 1991–2003: Early work ===
Bell started acting at the age of five, encouraged by his father who attempted to put him into Little League Baseball and other sports with no success before finding Bell's talent in public speaking and his confidence when impersonating people he would watch on television. Bell stated, "I was five, and my dad kind of said, 'Hey, you wanna be an actor?' and I said, 'Sure,' that kind of thing, you know? I was kind of put into it by my dad but, you know, good. I really love it, and I still do it." Bell's first televised commercial was for Whirlpool Appliances. "I had to sit under a tree and eat a Popsicle," Bell later stated, "I thought, 'I could get used to this.'" His first television show appearance was on a 1994 episode of Home Improvement. He appeared in Jerry Maguire (1996), and had a minor role in the Seinfeld episode "The Frogger" in 1998. In 1999, he acted in a commercial for Pokémon Red and Blue and in the film Dragonworld: The Legend Continues. In 2000, he was nominated for a Young Artist Award for his role as Cage Redding in the television film The Jack Bull. He began to play guitar at the age of 12. He received his first official guitar lessons from Roger Daltrey when he starred with him in the 2001 film Chasing Destiny. From 1999 until the show was cancelled in 2002, Bell was a featured performer on The Amanda Show. He also made a guest appearance on the series The Nightmare Room.

=== 2004–2009: Acting and musical breakthrough ===
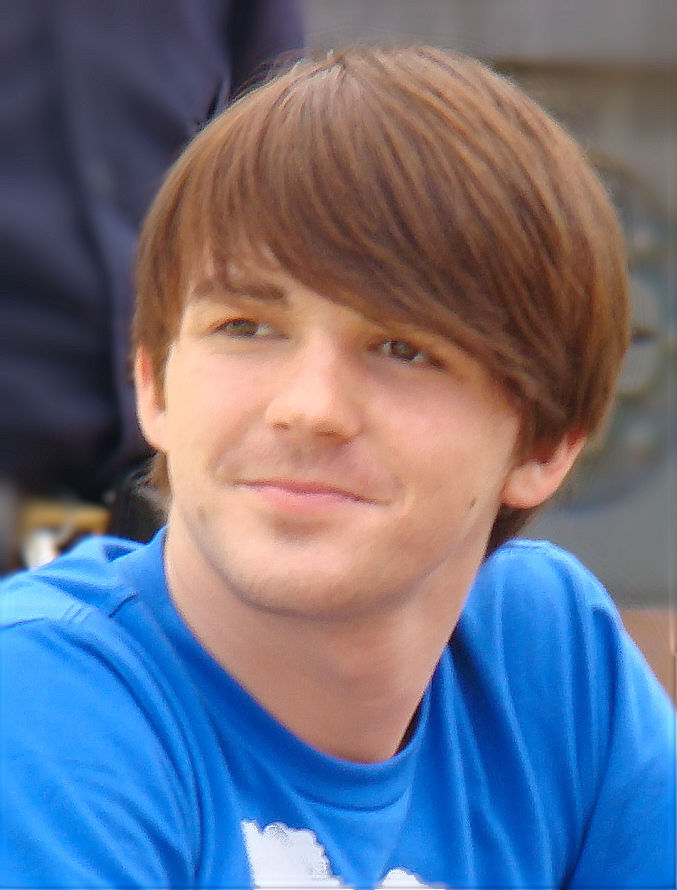
Bell in 2007

In 2003, Bell was cast as Drake Parker alongside Amanda Show costar Josh Peck on the Nickelodeon series Drake & Josh. His song "Found a Way" was featured as the theme song and is included on the show's soundtrack, released on February 22, 2005. During this time period, he appeared as himself on Nickelodeon's Zoey 101 in the episode "Spring Fling", where he performed "Highway to Nowhere", which is also featured on the Drake & Josh soundtrack. He also had his first of three consecutive wins at the Nickelodeon Kids' Choice Awards for "Favorite TV Actor". In 2005, Bell co-starred alongside Drake & Josh co-star Miranda Cosgrove with Dennis Quaid in Yours, Mine and Ours.

Telegraph, Bell's debut album, was released independently on August 23, 2005. The album includes 12 tracks. All the tracks were written only by Bell with the exception of "Highway to Nowhere". Being an independent release, the album ran out of print, and was re-released on August 7, 2007. "Down We Fall" was played on an episode of Drake & Josh titled "Number 1 Fan". In 2005, Bell performed with Hawk Nelson in a video for the Hawk Nelson song called "Bring 'Em Out", which was featured in the film Yours, Mine and Ours. The studio version was included on Hawk Nelson's EP Bring 'Em Out and on the special edition of Hawk Nelson Is My Friend.

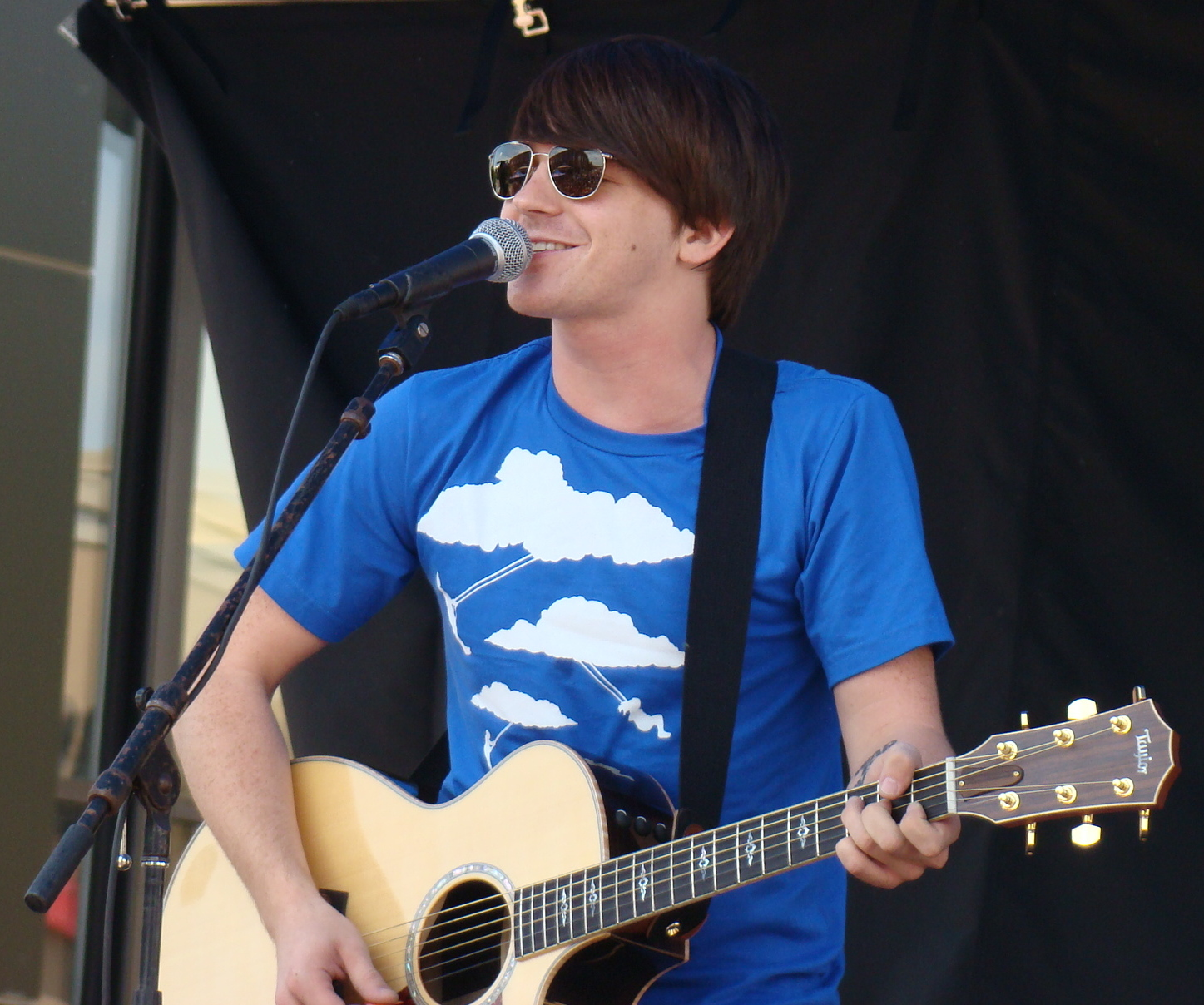
Bell performing in 2007

In 2006, Bell signed with Universal Motown. Bell's second album, It's Only Time, was released on December 5, 2006. Bell wrote all of the songs, however, they were all co-written with either C.J. Abraham, Michael Corcoran, or both. It reached Number 81 on Billboard's Top 200. It also charted on the Billboard Rock Charts at number 21. The album was more successful in Mexico, reaching number 4 in the Mexico Top 100. It is his first album to chart on the Billboard 200, and his highest-selling album with more than 178,000 copies sold in the United States as of 2012. He released the lead single, "I Know", on October 17, 2006. The video for "I Know" was released in October 2006. The single topped the Mexican music charts. "I Know" also appeared on the 2010 compilation album Pure Love Songs Vol. 2. His song from It's Only Time, "Makes Me Happy", peaked at number 3 on the Bubbling Under Hot 100 Singles Chart, which is an extension of the Hot 100. The song was featured in the Drake & Josh series finale "Really Big Shrimp". The song also made an appearance on the Pop 100 at number 67 and on the Hot Digital Songs chart at number 45. Because of the song's popularity, on October 16, 2007, the Radio Disney single edit version of his song "Makes Me Happy" was released on iTunes.

He also featured on the theme song for the show iCarly, "Leave It All to Me", with his Drake & Josh co-star Miranda Cosgrove. The music video for the song was released on Cosgrove's Vevo YouTube channel on September 28, 2010. The song took the lowest position on the Hot 100, peaking at number 100. It also peaked on the Pop 100 at number 83. He performed some Christmas songs in the Merry Christmas, Drake & Josh film, including "Jingle Bells" and "Christmas Promise". A DVD entitled Drake Bell in Concert was released on December 16, 2008. The video was unable to crack the 2008 or 2009 Top 100 in the U.S., but did chart on the Top 100 Mexican album charts, peaking at number 81. The DVD contains footage of him and his band live on stage while they toured in Mexico, filmed during five sold out fall nights. It also features 2 new songs and five covers, all of which are exclusive to the DVD. In the spring, Bell had a starring role in the comedy spoof film Superhero Movie. Bell recorded a theme song featuring his co-star Sara Paxton for the film called "Superhero! Song", which was released on April 8, 2008. In August 2008, he co-starred in the comedy College, which was shot on location in New Orleans. Bell also starred in Merry Christmas, Drake & Josh alongside Josh Peck, which began production in July 2008, and premiered on December 5, 2008. In 2009, his songs "Unbelievable" and "Modern Times", which were featured on a commercial for Twalkin, were released exclusively on Myspace. Bell was also cast in a pilot for a then upcoming CBS comedy series, Fish Tank, stating Bell's involvement is what put the series into production in the first place. The series however, was never picked up. Bell also had a third album, set to be released in 2009; however, the album was apparently shelved and never released, until it was released in 2020 as "The Lost Album".

=== 2010–present: Films and independent music ===
In 2010, he made a cameo appearance as Drake Parker in an iCarly episode entitled "iBloop" and a guest role in I Owe My Life to Corbin Bleu. He starred as Timmy Turner in the television film adaptation of its hit animated series The Fairly Odd Parents, A Fairly Odd Movie: Grow Up, Timmy Turner!, released in 2011 and reprised his role in the 2012 sequel A Fairly Odd Christmas. On May 18, 2011, a music video for Bell's song "You're Not Thinking" was released on YouTube. Bell's EP, titled A Reminder, was released on June 28, 2011. The lead single of A Reminder, "Terrific", was released on June 14, 2011, with the music video being released on December 9, 2012. The EP was produced by John Fields, who previously worked with Rooney, Jimmy Eat World, Selena Gomez, the Jonas Brothers, and Bleu. Bell decided to release the EP as a stopgap measure after a multi-year hiatus from the music scene, noting that a full-length studio album would not be released until the following year. Bell was sued by Fields, the producer of the EP, for 9 songs at 9,000 dollars each, totaling up to 81,000. Allegedly, Bell only paid for 5 songs for 45,000, but only 4 songs made it to the EP. The outcome of the lawsuit for breach of contract stays unreported.

In February 2012, Bell appeared in a Shane Dawson YouTube video entitled Kidnapping Drake Bell. Bell was cast as Spider-Man in the animated TV series Ultimate Spider-Man based on the comic book of the same name. He later reprised the role in The Avengers: Earth's Mightiest Heroes, replacing Josh Keaton who originally recorded his role for the series. He has also voiced the role of Spider-Man in two video games, Marvel Heroes, an MMORPG, and Disney Infinity 2.0, in 2013 and 2014, respectively. He was also in the 2012 Nickelodeon film Rags as Shawn. In 2013, Bell participated in an episode of the ABC reality TV series Splash, a celebrity diving competition, in which he made third place. On November 1, 2013, Bell released the studio version of his unreleased song "Nevermind" on YouTube. He released a holiday single, "Christmas Promise", on December 17, 2013. Throughout 2013 and 2014, Bell had roles in several animated films, such as The Naughty List, Adventure Planet, Birds of Paradise and Under Wraps. Bell returned as Timmy Turner in the third The Fairly OddParents live-action film, A Fairly Odd Summer, which was released on August 2, 2014. In 2014, Bell was nominated in the Capital Twitter Awards for Biggest Twitter Feud vs. Justin Bieber. Bell also appeared on Takepart Live to discuss his bankruptcy and other activities. Bell starred in an animated film entitled Frozen in Time, which was released November 11, 2014.

Bell had his third studio album set to be released in early 2013. Then, he stated it as "a complete concept record. Getting in a time machine and going back to the 40s and 50s." On April 22, 2014, Bell released his third studio album, his first rockabilly album, Ready Steady Go!, under Surfdog Records, with which he signed in 2012. It was produced by Peter Collins and childhood idol Brian Setzer, frontman of the rockabilly revival band Stray Cats. He has referred to the album as "getting in the DeLorian, hitting 88 miles per hour, and going back to the future." The album's lead single, "Bitchcraft", was released on January 28, 2014. The single was remixed by French electro swing band Caravan Palace. The album's promotional single, "I Won't Stand In Your Way", a cover of the Stray Cats' original song, was released on April 17, 2014. A cover of Cask Mouse's song "Bull", was released as the album's second single on October 8, 2014. The single was listed in the Mexican radio Top 10 for a number of weeks. The album was recorded completely live. It debuted and peaked at number 182 on the Billboard 200 and sold 2,000 copies in its first week of release. Bell took part in the High School Nation Tour in support of Ready Steady Go!, touring High Schools all around the U.S. The tour lasted from September 16 to October 22, 2014. It began in Los Angeles, California and ended in Charlotte, North Carolina. Bell also performed at Exa FM's Concerto Exa 2014 in Mexico City, performing to more than 50,000 people.

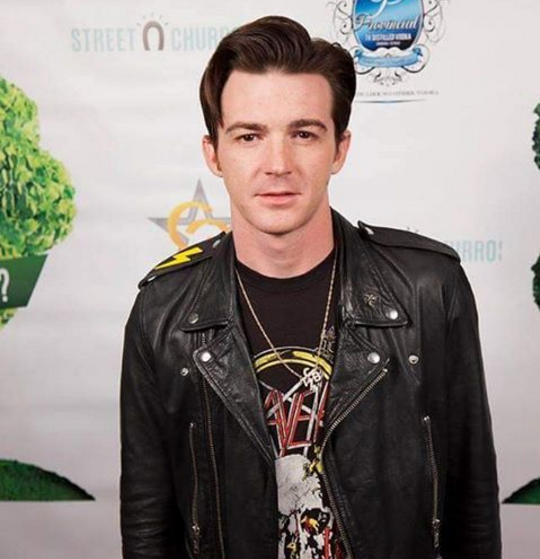
Bell in 2016

He starred with his Drake & Josh co-star Miranda Cosgrove in the animated film A Mouse Tale, which was released directly to DVD on February 10, 2015. Bell starred in the slasher film L.A. Slasher as The Popstar, which was released on June 26, 2015, in a limited theater release. Bell recorded a song for the film's soundtrack, titled "Day & Night". He also stars alongside Bella Thorne and Cameron Dallas in the United States dub of The Frog Kingdom, which was released on June 30, 2015, on video on demand and DVD. He appeared in a documentary about the genre of rockabilly and its culture titled It's a Rockabilly World! Bell later reprised his role as Spider-Man in the 2015 game Disney Infinity 3.0. He also guest starred in an episode with his Drake & Josh co-star Josh Peck on Peck's Fox television series Grandfathered; Bell guest stars as Kirk, a wealthy tech investor. The episode with Bell aired in the Spring of 2016. Bell is set to star as Dan Orange, lead singer of a band called "Orange and the Dead Ends" in a new digital series called Dan is Dead. The premiere date has not yet been set. Bell has recorded a song titled "We're Dead" for the series.

Bell embarked on a concert tour in Mexico starting on February 5, 2016, which ended on February 7, 2016. The tickets were sold out within minutes of going on sale online. Though Bell started the tour in 2015, the Ready Steady Go! Tour will continue in 2016. Bell toured high schools in the US as part of the High School Nation Tour from March 28 to April 29, 2016. Bell stars in the 2017 film Bad Kids of Crestview Academy, a sequel to the 2012 film Bad Kids Go to Hell. Bell released an EP titled Honest on June 30, 2017. In 2018 he released a Spanglish song, "Fuego Lento", and in 2019 released another EP, Smoke It Up.

On November 5, 2023, after his elimination on the fifth season of the Mexican television series ¿Quién es la máscara?, Bell was revealed to be Baby Alien. In 2024, Bell competed in season twelve of The Masked Singer as "Ice King" with Hanson (who competed in season five as "Russian Dolls") serving as his Mask Ambassador. He was eliminated on "Miley Cyrus Night".

In March 2024, Bell released "I Kind of Relate" as the lead single from his upcoming fifth studio album, Non-Stop Flight. In August 2024, Bell appeared on the fourteenth season of the Mexican reality singing competition La Academia. On the August 28 broadcast of the daily companion show La Academia: Camino a la Fama, he visited the contestants to hold a Q&A session regarding stage presence and navigating the music industry as an independent artist. During the appearance, he also performed his single "Te Desenamoraste". Following the album's release on October 25, 2024, he launched the Non-Stop Flight Tour across North and Latin America, performing over 90 shows into 2026.

On September 5, 2025, he released the single "Break Your Heart" with Colombian reggaeton singer Kevin Roldán. The collaboration originated when Bell personally reached out to Roldán, who grew up watching Bell on Drake & Josh, quickly agreed to the project. Filmed in Mexico City, the official music video. The track quickly became a significant success in the Latin market, eventually winning Song of the Year at the Tú Awards.

In February 2026, Bell collaborated with Grammy-winning songwriter and producer Toby Gad for a re-imagined release of the track "Nevermind (Piano Diaries)". The official music video was directed by Chris Applebaum, who previously directed Bell's "Going Away" video in 2023.

On November 20, 2026, Bell released his first full-length Christmas album, It's Christmas Time with The Drake Bell Orchestra, featuring 14 original holiday songs. That same day, he also appeared on the single "Elf on a Shelf" from Toby Gad's Christmas album Piano Diaries Christmas.

== Philanthropy ==
Since 2009, Bell has supported the Thirst Project, a non-profit organization that addresses the issue of the clean water crisis by raising awareness through education. Bell's contributions include public appeals and concerts to raise funds. Seth Maxwell, founder of the Thirst Project, recruited Bell to be the 'face' of the campaign. Bell has also made contributions to other organizations such as Toys for Tots.

On April 18, 2015, Bell performed at the Strawberry Bowl in support of the charity Rockin A Cure for cystic fibrosis.

== Personal life ==
=== Childhood assault and health problems ===
In 2024, Bell revealed that dialogue coach Brian Peck (of no relation to Josh Peck) repeatedly sexually assaulted him when he was 15, during the period after filming of the last season of The Amanda Show and before filming the first season for Drake & Josh. Peck was arrested on August 19, 2003, on 11 counts of child sexual abuse, later taking a plea deal in 2004 and being convicted of oral copulation with a minor under 16 as well as a charge of performing lewd acts with a 14- or 15-year-old. Peck was sentenced to 16 months in prison and was required to register as a sex offender for life. Because of his age, Bell's identity as the victim was not publicly revealed in the court records. Bell first revealed his identity and shared his experience in the 2024 documentary Quiet on Set: The Dark Side of Kids TV. According to the creators of the documentary, a number of high-profile Hollywood stars submitted character references in support of Brian Peck. These 41 letters, which remained under seal for years following his 2004 sentencing, included testimonials from several famous actors, notably James Marsden, X-Men producer Tom DeSanto, Taran Killam, Alan Thicke, Joanna Kerns, Kimmy Robertson and more. On The Sarah Fraser Show podcast on March 22, 2024, Bell revealed that he went to rehab after his interview for the documentary.

In April 2023, Bell was reported "missing and endangered" by the Daytona Beach Police Department in Florida. He was found safe a few hours after the public alert was issued. It was later reported that the "endangered" status was triggered after Bell's brother contacted police, alleging Bell had sent suicidal text messages. Deputies of the Daytona Beach Police said they "took action" to ensure Bell received a mental health evaluation.

On December 29, 2005, Bell, then 19 years old, and a friend of his were driving from Malibu to Los Angeles when, while stopped at a red light on California State Route 1, the two were struck by an oncoming vehicle. Though Bell's passenger suffered only bruises, Bell suffered more severe injuries, including a cervical fracture of his neck vertebrae, a broken jaw at three places, the loss of several teeth, and deep facial lacerations. As part of his recovery, Bell required more than 70 facial stitches, had to have his jaw wired shut for two months, and underwent surgery on his chin and mouth.

=== Family ===
In July 2021, Bell revealed that in 2018 he had married his girlfriend of five years and that they had a son. After separating in September 2022, Bell's wife filed for divorce on April 20, 2023, citing irreconcilable differences. In August 2025, Bell filed additional documents to proceed with finalizing the divorce in Seminole County, Florida. A spokesperson of Bell said "Their priority remains the safety and well-being of their son, and they are doing so from a place of love and respect." He also said Bell and his ex-partner are "closing a beautiful chapter of their lives."

=== Residence ===
In 2007, Bell purchased a 2,640-square-foot (245 m^{2}) house in Los Feliz for $2,050,000. After Bell filed for bankruptcy in California in early 2014, the house was taken in foreclosure.

As of March 2024, Bell primarily resides in Mexico City to record his album Non-Stop Flight. In an interview with Yordi Rosado on March 24, 2024, Bell revealed that he would like to move to Mexico, telling Rosado "I feel more at home when I'm here. I have more friends here [because] a lot of my friends from Los Angeles have moved to Florida, Texas, Louisiana, and so my relationship with them is on the phone anyway". During the February 2 episode of Josh Peck's "Good Guys" podcast in 2026 Bell declared that he is a resident of Celebration, Florida.

=== Driving under the influence ===
Bell was arrested on December 21, 2015, for driving under the influence in Glendale, California, at 2:45 am after police officers witnessed him swerving and driving well over the speed limit. He was subsequently released on $20,000 bond and pleaded not guilty. In September 2016 Bell pleaded guilty and was sentenced to four days in jail and four years' probation and would be required to attend an alcohol education program; Bell served only one day for good behavior. Bell was previously charged with driving under the influence in 2010 in relation to an incident in San Diego in 2009.

=== Child endangerment conviction ===
In June 2021, Bell faced legal charges in Cleveland, Ohio, consisting of a fourth-degree felony count of attempted child endangerment and a misdemeanor count of disseminating matter harmful to juveniles. These charges arose from a law enforcement investigation into inappropriate social media messages Bell sent to a 15-year-old Canadian citizen in 2017, which authorities determined violated a legal duty of care. Although Bell initially entered a plea of not guilty, he subsequently accepted a plea agreement and pleaded guilty to both counts end of June 2021.

The court sentenced Bell to two years of probation and 200 hours of community service. Following the sentencing hearing, defense attorney Ian Friedman stated that the plea reflected conduct for which Bell accepted responsibility, emphasizing that the court made clear the plea did not involve sexual misconduct or sexual relations with a minor, and that communication ceased when the individual's age became known. Bell later stated he accepted the plea agreement to resolve the legal proceedings quickly without subjecting his family to a prolonged trial.

== Filmography ==
=== Film ===
Year	Title	Role	Notes
1995	Drifting School	Kenny Smith	
1995	The Neon Bible	David, aged 10	
1996	Jerry Maguire	Jesse Remo	
1999	Dill Scallion	Eugene Bob	
1999	Dragonworld: The Legend Continues	Johnny McGowan	Direct-to-video
2000	High Fidelity	Young Rob Gordon	
2000	Perfect Game	Bobby Jr.	
2005	Yours, Mine and Ours	Dylan North	
2008	Superhero Movie	Rick Riker / Dragonfly	
2008	College	Kevin	
2008	Unstable Fables: Tortoise vs. Hare	Butch Hare	Voice; direct-to-video
2008	The Nutty Professor	Harold Kelp / Jack	Voice; direct-to-video
2010	I Owe My Life to Corbin Bleu	Himself	Short film
2010	Pure Country 2: The Gift	Drake	
2012	A Monster Christmas	Matt, Elf #2, News Reporter	Voice
2012	The Reef 2: High Tide	Pi	Voice
2012	Keenan Cahill's Story	Himself	Documentary
2013	Monsterous Holiday	Andy	Voice
2013	Space Warriors	Jimmy / Narrator	Voice
2013	The Naughty List	Snowflake	Voice; direct-to-video
2013	The Little Penguin Pororo's Racing Adventure	White Tiger	Voice; direct-to-video
2014	20 Moves	Himself	Documentary
2014	Birds of Paradise	Jack	Voice; direct-to-video
2014	Adventure Planet	Sam	Voice; direct-to-video
2014	Under Wraps	Danny	Voice; direct-to-video
2014	Frozen in Time	Brody	Voice; direct-to-video
2015	A Mouse Tale	Sebastian	Voice; direct-to-video
2015	Jungle Shuffle	Manu	Voice; direct-to-video
2015	The Frog Kingdom	Announcer, Muscles	Voice; direct-to-video
2015	The Greys	Blake Smelt	Short film
2015	L.A. Slasher	The Popstar	
2015	The Nutcracker Sweet	Nutcracker	Voice; direct-to-video
2016	It's a Rockabilly World!	Himself	Voice; direct-to-video
2016	Arlo: The Burping Pig	Arlo	Voice
2017	Bad Kids of Crestview Academy	Ben	
2017	The Blind Girl	Jack	Short film
2017	A Stork's Journey	Richard	Voice
2017	American Satan	Damien	
2018	Cover Versions	Byron	
2020	The Big Trip	Oscar	Voice; direct-to-video

=== Television ===
Year	Title	Role	Notes
1994	Home Improvement	Little Pete	Season 3, Episode 22: "Swing Time"
1995	Minor Adjustments	Jordan	Episode: "The Ex Files"
1996	ABC Afterschool Special	Scott	Episode: "Me and My Hormones"
1996	Men Behaving Badly	Charlie Atwood	Episode: "Carpe Dino"
1997	Gun	Brendan	Episode: "The Hole"
1997	Over the Top	Clarence	Episode: "The Bee Story"
1997	The Pretender	Shawn Boyd	Episode: "Scott Free"
1997	The Drew Carey Show	The Blues Kid	Episode: "That Thing You Don't"
1998	Seinfeld	Kenny	Episode: "The Frogger"
1999	Caroline in the City	Rodney	Episode: "Caroline and the Horny Kid"
1999	The Jack Bull	Cage Redding	Television film
1999–2002	The Amanda Show	Various roles	Main role
2000	Double Dare 2000	Himself	2 episodes; Along with the cast of The Amanda Show
2001	Chasing Destiny	Walter	Television film
2002	The Nightmare Room	Alex Sanders	Episode: "Dear Diary, I'm Dead"
2002	Rugrats	Dusty	Voice; episode: "Lil's Phil of Trash"
2002	So Little Time	Himself	Episode: "Waiting for Gibson"
2004–05	All That	Himself/Various roles	Main role
2004–07	Drake & Josh	Drake Parker	Main role
2005	Zoey 101	Himself	Episode: "Spring Fling"
2006	Drake & Josh Go Hollywood	Drake Parker	Television film
2008	Merry Christmas, Drake & Josh	Drake Parker	Television film
2009	The Fish Tank	Fish	Pilot
2010	iCarly	Drake Parker	Episode: "iBloop"
2010	7 Secrets with Miranda Cosgrove	Himself	Nickelodeon documentary
2011	A Fairly Odd Movie: Grow Up, Timmy Turner!	Timmy Turner	Television film
2012	Victorious	Himself	Episode: "April Fools Blank"
2012	The Avengers: Earth's Mightiest Heroes	Spider-Man/Peter Parker	Voice; recurring role (season 2)
2012	Figure It Out	Himself	Panelist
2012	Celebrity Ghost Stories	Himself	Episode: "Tito Ortiz, Cary Elwes, Sally Kellerman and Drake Bell"
2012	Rags	Shawn	Television film
2012	Abominable Christmas	Matt	Voice; television film
2012	A Fairly Odd Christmas	Timmy Turner	Television film
2012–17	Ultimate Spider-Man	Spider-Man/Peter Parker, Swarm, Spider-Punk, Kaine Parker, various voices	Main voice role
2013	Splash	Himself	Contestant, 3rd Place
2013	Phineas and Ferb	Spider-Man/Peter Parker	Voice; episode: "Phineas and Ferb: Mission Marvel"
2013	A Monsterous Holiday	Andy	Voice; television film
2013–15	Avengers Assemble	Spider-Man/Peter Parker	Voice; 3 episodes
2013–15	Hulk and the Agents of S.M.A.S.H.	Spider-Man, Spider-Raptor	Voice, 5 episodes
2014	Sam & Cat	Drake Parker	Episode: #blooperepisode (archive footage)
2014	A Fairly Odd Summer	Timmy Turner	Television film
2016	Suspense	Artus Vitogast	Radio series; episode: "This World's Not Big Enough..."
2016	Grandfathered	Kirk	Episode: "The Biter"
2016	Cozmo's	Ken	Television film
2016	Cupcake Wars	Himself	Contestant; Episode: "Celebrity: Matilda"
2017	Ben 10	Michael Morningstar	Voice; episode: "Bright Lights, Black Hearts"
2017	Home and Family	Himself	Performer; Episode: "Guest Co-Hostess Ali Fedotowsky-Manno/Harry Connick Jr./Drake Bell"
2017	Safeword	Himself	Contestant; episode: "Drake Bell vs. Ron Funches"
2018	Do or Dare	Himself	Contestant; episode: "Gaten Matarazzo vs. Drake Bell"
2018	Highly Gifted	Alan	Voice
2018	The Challenge: Champs vs. Stars	Himself	Contestant
2018	The Adventures of Kid Danger	Drake Parker	Voice; episode: "Snooze Pods"
2018	Double Dare	Himself	Episode: "Comeback Kids vs. Red Hot Cocoa"
2019	Double Dare	Himself	2 episodes
2021	Robot Chicken	Drake Parker	Voice; episode: "May Cause Immaculate Conception"
2023	¿Quién es la máscara?	Himself/Baby Alien	Season 5 contestant
2024	Quiet on Set: The Dark Side of Kids TV	Himself	Documentary series; 3 episodes
2024	The Masked Singer	Himself/Ice King	Season 12 contestant

=== Video games ===
Year	Title	Role	Notes
2007	Drake & Josh	Drake Parker	Character design
2007	Drake & Josh: Talent Showdown	Drake Parker	Character design
2013	Marvel Heroes	Spider-Man (voice)	
2014	Disney Infinity 2.0	Spider-Man (voice)	
2015	Disney Infinity 3.0	Spider-Man (voice)	
2019	Kingdom Hearts III	Young Eraqus (voice)	

=== Web ===
Year	Title	Role	Notes
2010	I <3 Vampires	Ian	2 episodes
2012	BlackBoxTV Presents	Jason	Episode: "Last Encounter"
2012	Kidnapping Drake Bell	Himself	On YouTube channel Shane Dawson TV
2013	Lego Marvel Super Heroes: Maximum Overload	Spider-Man	Voice; Web film
2017	Dan is Dead	Peter Gary Sandlittle/Dan Orange	Lead role

== Discography ==
- Telegraph (2005)
- It's Only Time (2006)
- Ready Steady Go! (2014)
- The Lost Album (2020)
- Non-Stop Flight (2024)
- It's Christmas Time with The Drake Bell Orchestra (2026)

== Books ==
In 2023, Bell announced on his Twitter account that he is writing a book titled I Found A Way.

== Awards and nominations ==
Bell was nominated for a Young Artist Award twice, once in 2000 for his role in The Jack Bull, in which he won, and another time in 2006 for Yours, Mine and Ours. He has won 10 Kids Choice Awards, three in the United States and five internationally for his role as Drake Parker on Drake & Josh. He also won a Kids Choice Award in 2007 in the United Kingdom for Best Male Singer, winning over Justin Timberlake. He was also nominated for Best TV Actor, but lost to Nat Wolff. Bell has also won a Teen Choice Award in 2008 for his role as the Dragonfly in Superhero Movie. He was also nominated for an award in 2014 in the Capital Twitter Awards for biggest Twitter feud with Justin Bieber. In 2025 Bell won the award for Best Song of the Year at the Mexican Tú Awards for his song Break your Heart with Colombian singer Kevin Roldán. They also performed their song during the award show.

Year	Award	Category	Result
2000	Young Artist Award (21st Young Artist Awards)	Best Performance in a TV Movie or Pilot	Won
2006	Young Artist Award (27th Young Artist Awards)	Best Performance in a Feature Film	Nominated
2006	Blimp Award (Kids' Choice Awards)	Favorite TV Actor (Drake & Josh)	Won
2007	Blimp Award (Kids' Choice Awards)	Favorite TV Actor (Drake & Josh)	Won
2007	Blimp Award (UK Kids' Choice Awards)	Best TV Actor	Nominated
2007	Blimp Award (UK Kids' Choice Awards)	Best Male Singer	Won
2007	Blimp Award (UK Kids' Choice Awards)	Best TV Show (Drake & Josh)	Won
2008	Blimp Award (Kids' Choice Awards)	Favorite TV Actor (Drake & Josh)	Won
2008	Blimp Award (Germany Kids' Choice Awards)	Favorite TV Actor (Drake & Josh)	Nominated
2008	Blimp Award (KCA Brazil 2008 – Meus Prêmios Nick)	Favorite International Artist	Won
2008	Surfboard Award (Teen Choice Awards)	Choice Movie Breakout Actor (Superhero Movie)	Won
2008	ASCAP Award (ASCAP)	Top TV Series (Drake & Josh)	Won
2008	Blimp Award (Nickelodeon Australian Kids' Choice Awards)	Favorite International TV Star	Nominated
2009	Blimp Award (Nickelodeon Australian Kids' Choice Awards)	Favorite International TV Star	Won
2010	Blimp Award (Nickelodeon Australian Kids' Choice Awards)	Big Kid Award	Won
2010	Blimp Award (Nickelodeon Kids' Choice Awards Mexico)	Favorite TV Actor (Drake & Josh)	Won
2010	Blimp Award (Nickelodeon Kids' Choice Awards Mexico)	Favorite International Character Male	Won
2014	Best Feud (Capital Twitter Awards)	Biggest Twitter Feud (vs. Justin Bieber)	Nominated
2025	Tú Awards México	Best Song of the Year: Break your Heart (ft. Kevin Roldán)	Won
