= I Found a Way =

Television theme song

Song by Drake Bell

from the album Drake & Josh and Telegraph
- Recorded: 2003
- Genre: Pop; alternative rock
- Length: 2:59
- Label: Nickelodeon; Columbia
- Songwriters: Drake Bell; Michael Corcoran

"I Found a Way" (also known as "Found a Way") is a song by American actor and singer Drake Bell, from the Nickelodeon show Drake & Josh's soundtrack album of the same name (2005), and Bell's debut studio album Telegraph (2005). The song was written by Bell and Michael Corcoran, one of Bell's band members. It served as the theme song for the show after the show's producer Dan Schneider lauded the track. Bell performed "I Found a Way" at various events throughout his career.

== Background and production ==
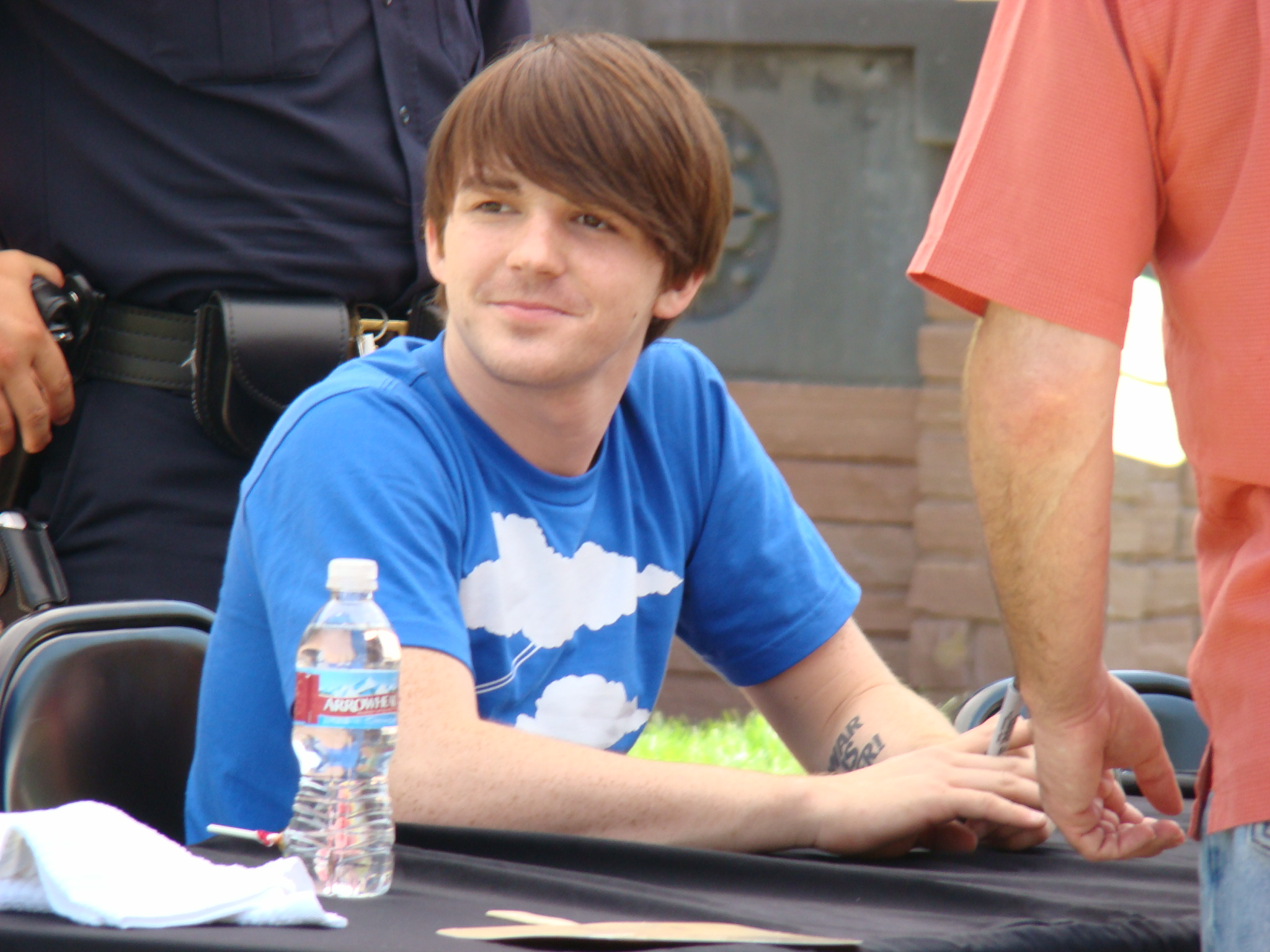
Bell in 2007, when Drake & Josh was on air

American actor and singer Drake Bell told American animator Butch Hartman during an interview in September 2018 that the theme song for Drake & Josh was originally going to be a Lenny Kravitz song. American producer Dan Schneider asked Bell how much of his music he wanted to put on the show. Bell was very eager to make music for the show and told Schneider he wanted to be a "rock star". The actor told his friend Michael Corcoran, one of his band members, that they should write a theme song for Drake & Josh because everyone was listening to Kravitz at the time and wanted to have a track that could be identified with the show.

Bell and Corcoran were faced with writer's block for hours because of wanting to "make a theme song" and decided to just "write a song". Bell told Hartman the track they wrote was similar to the works of Elvis Costello and is about helping out your brother when they are feeling down. The two musicians made a one-minute demo of the song in 2003. Bell brought the record to Warner Bros Studios to show Schneider the demo. The producer was reluctant at first, not wanting to hurt Bell's feelings if he did not like the track. Bell insisted and played the track to him. Schneider ended up loving the track and made it the theme song for Drake & Josh.

== Composition and lyrics ==
"I Found a Way" was originally released as the first track from the Nickelodeon show Drake & Josh's soundtrack album of the same name on February 22, 2005. It was later released as the second track under the title "Found a Way" on Bell's debut studio album Telegraph on August 23, 2005. It received a music video directed by Joey Boukadakis.

According to Chloe Barns of Collider, "Found a Way" is a pop and alternative rock track. The song is about the relationship between the two main characters of the show. According to Bell, his fans have usually sung the song's chorus as: "If you open up your mind/See what's inside/It's gonna take some time to realize." Bell stated that the correct lyric was, "It's gonna take some time to re-align."

== Critical reception ==
"I Found a Way" was met with mainly positive reviews from music critics. Writing for Bustle, Taylor Ferber said the theme song is "catchy AF" and opined it is "totally a perfect fit to get audiences in the upbeat mood of the show". Maria Serra of Alternative Press called it a "banger". Cassandra R Lopez of Girls' Life stated the track is "still a banger". Lauren Hazlewood of Fashion described it as a "catchy theme song", while the staff of Iowa City Press-Citizen labeled the song as a "signature tune". Lexi Carson for The Hollywood Reporter declared it is a "beloved theme song". Writing for Teen Vogue, editor Gabe Bergado opined that "I Found a Way" is the "classic Nickelodeon show's theme song".

Jacquez Printup for Yardbarker labeled it as "too iconic", while stating that it is "a childhood classic that transports me back to the good times almost instantly". MTV editor Crystal Bell ranked "I Found a Way" at number four on her The 17 Best Nickelodeon Theme Songs, Ranked list, calling it "a hella catchy tune". Bustle's Tobi Gbile ranked "I Found a Way" at number four on his These Childhood Theme Songs Will Give You Feels list, saying the theme song is one of his favorites and that it became "one of Nickelodeon's staple tracks in the mid 2000s". Nick Caruso and Matt Webb Mitovich for TVLine included the theme song on their The Top TV Theme Songs of All Time: 2000-2009 Edition list.

== Live performances ==
In August 2016, American actor Josh Peck posted a video on his Instagram account of fellow American actor John Stamos singing his own version of the song. Stamos sings in the video: "Drake and Josh. Everybody loves Drake and Josh". Bell sang the song with a fan in Fresno, California, at a meet and greet held at Heroes Comics prior to his concert in 2018.

During one of his shows in 2020, the actor started to sing "I Found a Way" and stopped the crowd after they sang, "It's gonna take some time to realize." Before continuing to play the track, Bell told the audience that the word was "realign" and not "realize". Bell also performed the song for American actor Jonathan Goldstein, who played the dad named Walter Nichols in Drake & Josh, during a 2020 reunion. He performed the song live in Tucson, Arizona at a drive-in concert on March 13, 2021.

== Credits and personnel ==
Credits adapted from Tidal.

- Drake Bell – vocals, writer
- Michael Corcoran – writer
