= Drake & Josh =

American teen sitcom (2004-2007)

- Genre: Teen Sitcom; Slapstick
- Created by: Dan Schneider
- Showrunner: Dan Schneider
- Starring: Drake Bell; Josh Peck; Nancy Sullivan; Jonathan Goldstein; Miranda Cosgrove
- Theme music composer: Drake Bell; Backhouse Mike
- Opening theme: "I Found a Way"
- Ending theme: "I Found a Way" (instrumental)
- Composers: Scott Clausen (season 1–3); Michael Corcoran (season 4)
- Country of origin: United States
- Original language: English
- No. of seasons: 4
- No. of episodes: 56 (list of episodes)

Production
- Executive producer: Dan Schneider
- Producers: Robin Weiner; Joe Catania; Bruce Rand Berman
- Camera setup: Videotape (filmized); Multi-camera; Filmlook
- Running time: 22–23 minutes; 47 minutes (Really Big Shrimp)
- Production companies: Schneider's Bakery; Nickelodeon Productions

Original release
- Network: Nickelodeon
- Release: January 11, 2004 – September 16, 2007

Drake & Josh is an American buddy teen sitcom created by Dan Schneider for Nickelodeon. The series follows teenage stepbrothers Drake Parker (Drake Bell) and Josh Nichols (Josh Peck) as they live together despite their opposite personalities. Nancy Sullivan and Jonathan Goldstein starred as Drake's mother Audrey and Josh's father Walter, respectively, and Miranda Cosgrove starred as Drake's devious younger sister Megan. Bell performed the series' theme song, "I Found a Way", written by Bell and Backhouse Mike.

Bell and Peck previously appeared in The Amanda Show, a variety series that Schneider also created for Nickelodeon. A sketch featuring Bell and Peck arguing over a piece of shrimp prompted network executives to cast the two actors in their own spin-off, Drake & Josh, which premiered on January 11, 2004. During production of the fourth season, Bell was injured during a car accident, and filming stalled for four months during his recovery. A television film, Drake & Josh Go Hollywood, premiered in early 2006. A television special, Really Big Shrimp, served as the series finale, and the series' final new broadcast episode aired on September 16, 2007, marking 56 episodes in 4 seasons for the show. Afterwards, the network aired the one-time special Merry Christmas, Drake & Josh in late 2008.

Drake & Josh was a ratings success, garnering 3.2 million viewers for its premiere, and it consistently ranked as one of the most watched series in its demographic during its run. It won 2 Nickelodeon Kids' Choice Awards, 2 UK Kids' Choice Awards, and 3 Australian Kids' Choice Awards and was nominated for 7 other awards, including at the Young Artist Awards and the Casting Society of America. Other media include books, DVD and VHS releases, promotional singles, and video games based on the series.

== Plot ==
The series revolves around two teenage stepbrothers, Drake Parker and Josh Nichols, who live in San Diego, California, with Drake's younger biological sister Megan and biological mother Audrey, and Josh's biological father Walter. Drake is cool and charismatic, having his own band and being popular with girls, yet can be narcissistic and absent-minded, while Josh is intellectual, clumsy, and awkward; yet very loving and caring. Josh starts working at a local movie theater in the second season, which becomes a key set location for the rest of the series. Despite their opposite personalities, Drake and Josh have shown multiple times throughout the series that they care deeply about each other and have each other's backs. The two boys are often involved in comedic escapades and challenges while handling various teenage problems.

== Cast ==
=== Main ===
- Drake Bell as Drake Parker: Megan's biological brother, Josh's stepbrother, Audrey's biological son, and Walter's stepson
- Josh Peck as Josh Nichols: Drake's and Megan's stepbrother, Audrey's stepson, and Walter's biological son
- Nancy Sullivan as Audrey Parker-Nichols: Josh's stepmother, Drake's and Megan's biological mother
- Jonathan Goldstein as Walter Nichols: Josh's biological father, and Drake's and Megan's stepfather
- Miranda Cosgrove as Megan Parker: Drake's biological sister, Josh's stepsister, Audrey's biological daughter, and Walter's stepdaughter

=== Recurring ===
- Yvette Nicole Brown as Helen Dubois, manager of the Premiere movie theater (portrayed by Frances Callier in the episode "Little Diva")
- Jerry Trainor as "Crazy" Steve, employee at the Premiere
- Allison Scagliotti as Mindy Crenshaw, Josh's girlfriend and ex-science fair rival
- Alec Medlock as Craig Ramirez, Drake and Josh's friend
- Scott Halberstadt as Eric Blonowitz, Drake and Josh's other friend
- Jake Farrow as Gavin Mitchell, another employee at the Premiere
- Julia Duffy as Mrs. Hayfer, Drake and Josh's teacher at Belleview High School
- Roark Critchlow as Dr. Jeff Glazer, a doctor who lives across the street from Drake and Josh, who usually charges them a lot despite not doing much
- Cathy Shim as Leah, an employee at the Premiere who appears in the series' fourth season
- Josh Sussman as Clayton, Drake and Josh's classmate at Belleview High School
- Johnny Lewis as Scottie, Molly Orr as Rina, and Jeremy Ray Valdez as Paul, the band members of Drake's band who appear in the series' first season

== Episodes ==
Season	Episodes	Originally released	
Season	Episodes	First released	Last released
1	6	January 11, 2004	February 22, 2004
2	14	March 14, 2004	November 28, 2004
3	17	April 2, 2005	April 8, 2006
4	19	September 24, 2006	September 16, 2007
Films		January 6, 2006	December 5, 2008

== Production ==
Drake Bell and Josh Peck had previously acted together on The Amanda Show, created by Dan Schneider. Bell and Peck's differing personalities inspired Schneider in 2001 to create a new show starring them as characters with traits similar to their own. An unaired pilot episode featured Stephen Furst as Walter Nichols, although he was busy with another project when Drake & Josh was picked up as a series, and Jonathan Goldstein was cast in the role instead. A house in Los Angeles' Encino neighborhood was used for exterior shots of the family's home, while interior scenes were shot on a sound stage at the Nickelodeon on Sunset studios in Hollywood. Tribune Studios in Hollywood was also used as a filming location.

Production was suspended in late December 2005, after Bell's injury in a car crash, prior to which he had filmed three episodes of the fourth season. Bell's accident was the result of a driver falling asleep at the wheel and colliding head-on with Bell's 1966 Mustang, which had no seat belts or airbags, resulting in extensive facial injuries. Filming resumed in March 2006 with the episode "My Dinner with Bobo". The following month, Nickelodeon greenlit an additional seven episodes for the fourth season, and Bell and Peck signed on to direct several episodes. With the extended season, filming continued through July 2006. According to Schneider, the show ended due to a collective decision from the creative forces behind the show.

The profession of the family's mother is never revealed on the show, although Schneider had written dialogue into the series finale that would have revealed her profession at a catering business. The scene was filmed, but Schneider ultimately chose to remove it during editing. Schneider said, "On the one hand, I thought it was funny to finally reveal it, so casually, in the very last episode – there was something ironic about that. But then I decided that, because fans always seemed to have fun trying to figure it out (what 'Mom's' name and job were), it would be better to 'keep the bit going' for eternity, by never revealing it in any episode."

== Release ==
=== Broadcast ===
Drake & Josh aired on Nickelodeon and premiered in the United States on January 11, 2004. The final episode aired on September 16, 2007.

=== Home media ===
Below is a list of official DVD and VHS releases of Drake & Josh.

Title	Region 1	Region 4	Contains
Drake & Josh: Vol. 1 Suddenly Brothers (VHS release included)	February 15, 2005	2009	Includes "Pilot", "Dune Buggy", "Two Idiots and a Baby", "First Crush", and outtakes.
Drake & Josh: Vol. 2 Suddenly Family	Unreleased (Note: This volume was supposed to be released but was later cancelled)		Includes "The Bet", "Football", "Movie Job", "Pool Shark", outtakes, and clips from U Pick Live
Drake & Josh Go Hollywood (VHS release included)	January 31, 2006	2010	Includes Drake & Josh Go Hollywood; episodes "Helen's Surgery" and "Mindy's Back"; bloopers; and "I Found a Way" music video.
TEENick Picks Vol. 1	2006	N/A	Includes "We're Married?"
Nickelodeon Kid's Choice Winners Collection (Note: This set was released exclusively at Wal-Mart)	2007	N/A	Includes "Who's Got Game?".
The Best of Drake & Josh: Seasons 1 & 2	August 21, 2008	January 4, 2016	Includes "Pilot", "Dune Buggy", "Two Idiots and a Baby", "First Crush", "Grammy", "The Bet", "Movie Job", "Football", "Pool Shark", "Smart Girl", "Little Diva", "Number 1 Fan", "Mean Teacher", "Drew & Jerry", and "Honor Council".
The Best of Drake & Josh: Seasons 3 & 4	August 29, 2008	N/A	Includes episodes "Alien Invasion", "Little Sibling", "Megan's New Teacher", "Foam Finger", "We're Married?", "Paging Dr. Drake", "Theater Thug", "Girl Power", "Dance Contest", "Treehouse", "Helicopter", "Megan's Revenge", "The Great Doheny", and "The Storm".
Drake & Josh: Hermanos y Cómplices (Brothers and Accomplices); Drake & Josh: Parceiros No Crime (Partners in Crime)	N/A	2011 (Note: The DVD was only released in Latin America; thus, it features English, Latin American Spanish and Brazilian Portuguese audio tracks, and English, Spanish and Portugal subtitle tracks)	Includes episodes "Smart Girl", "Football", "Little Diva", "The Gary Grill", "Pool Shark", "Honour Council", pilot episode of "iCarly"

== Reception ==
The series premiere was watched by 3.2 million viewers, Nickelodeon's highest-rated series premiere in nearly 10 years. As of 2006, Drake & Josh ranked consistently among the 10 most-watched cable shows of the week, and was the top-rated live-action series among children aged 2 to 11 years old. It averaged three million viewers at the time. It proved to be popular with younger viewers. According to Schneider, Drake & Josh had its highest ratings in its final season.

=== Awards and nominations ===
Year	Award	Category	Recipient	Result
2005	2005 Kids' Choice Awards	Favorite TV Show	Drake & Josh	Nominated
2006	2006 Kids' Choice Awards	Favorite TV Show	Drake & Josh	Won
2006	2006 Australian Kids' Choice Awards	Fave TV Show	Drake & Josh	Nominated
2007	2007 Kids' Choice Awards	Favorite TV Show	Drake & Josh	Nominated
2007	2007 UK Kids' Choice Awards	Best TV Show	Drake & Josh	Won
2007	2007 UK Kids' Choice Awards	Best TV Actor	Drake Bell	Nominated
2007	2007 Australian Kids' Choice Awards	Fave Nick Show	Drake & Josh	Won
2007	Young Artist Awards	Best Performance in a TV Series (Comedy or Drama) – Supporting Young Actress	Miranda Cosgrove	Nominated
2007	Casting Society of America	Best Casting – Children's TV Programming	Krisha Bullock	Nominated
2008	2008 Kids' Choice Awards	Favorite TV Show	Drake & Josh	Won
2008	2008 UK Kids' Choice Awards	Favorite Kids' TV Show	Drake & Josh	Won
2008	2008 Australian Kids' Choice Awards	Fave Comedy Show	Drake & Josh	Won
2009	2009 Australian Kids' Choice Awards	Fave Comedy Show	Drake & Josh	Nominated
2010	2010 Australian Kids' Choice Awards	Big Kid Award	Drake Bell	Won

== Films ==
The series received two television films. Drake & Josh Go Hollywood premiered on January 6, 2006. In the film, Drake and Josh are left at home in San Diego after their parents go on a ten-day cruise. The boys are told to take Megan to the airport so she can visit her friend in Denver, but they accidentally send her on a flight to Los Angeles instead. Drake and Josh go to Hollywood to get Megan back, but end up stopping a multibillion-dollar heist and booking a guest-spot for Drake on TRL. According to TV Guide, it was the highest-rated program on all of cable during its opening week.

Merry Christmas, Drake & Josh premiered on December 5, 2008. Michael Grossman directed the film, and Schneider returned as executive producer. In the film, Drake and Josh try to give a foster family "the best Christmas ever". The premiere of Merry Christmas, Drake & Josh broke the record of most viewers for the premiere of a Nickelodeon film with 9.10 million viewers, a title previously held by iGo to Japan.

== Other media ==
=== Music ===
Name	Notes
"I Found a Way"	The opening theme song of the TV series by Drake Bell. Music video directed by Joey Boukadakis.
Drake & Josh	The Drake & Josh soundtrack from the TV series.
"Makes Me Happy"	From the episode "Really Big Shrimp" by Drake Bell.
"Jingle Bells"	From the TV film Merry Christmas, Drake & Josh by Drake Bell.
"Christmas Wrapping"	From the TV film Merry Christmas, Drake & Josh by Miranda Cosgrove.

=== Video games ===
Two video games based on Drake & Josh have been released on the Game Boy Advance and Nintendo DS. Both of them were published by THQ and released in 2007.

Game	Publisher	Platform	North American release date
Drake & Josh	THQ	Game Boy Advance	March 15, 2007
Drake & Josh: Talent Showdown	THQ	Nintendo DS	July 30, 2007

=== Books ===
A book series based on Drake & Josh has been published by children's publisher Scholastic since 2006. The books are written by author Laurie McElroy.

Book	Author	Info
Blues Brothers	Laurie McElroy	Based on the episodes "Blues Brothers" and "Number 1 Fan"
Sibling Revelry	Laurie McElroy	Based on the episodes "The Bet" and "Peruvian Puff Pepper"
Drake & Josh Go Hollywood	Laurie McElroy	Based on the TV film Drake & Josh Go Hollywood
Kid Trouble	Laurie McElroy	Based on the episodes "Megan's New Teacher" and "Little Sibling"
Alien Invasion	Laurie McElroy	Based on the episodes "Alien Invasion" and "The Demonator"
Surprise!	Laurie McElroy	Based on the episodes "Josh Runs into Oprah" and "Vicious Tiberius"
Josh Is Done	Laurie McElroy	Based on the episodes "Josh Is Done" and "I Love Sushi"

A Cine-Manga version titled, "Match Made in Heaven", was released by TokyoPop in 2006. The book was based on the first two episodes of the first season.

=== Online videos ===
Beginning in December 2016, Bell and other cast members released a series of short online videos titled Where's Walter? Bell, Sullivan, and Yvette Nicole Brown reprised their roles for the videos, which involve a search for Walter after he goes missing.

=== Possible revival ===
In March 2019, Bell announced that he and Peck were working on a Drake & Josh revival that would feature both of them reprising their roles. The proposed project would have featured similar characters and scenarios in a more adult, comedic way. At the time, Bell and Peck were in discussions with several networks about the project.

In October 2021, it was reported that the original proposed revival had been cancelled, as a result of production delays and Bell's guilty plea to his recent criminal charges.

In March 2022, Bell and his wife Janet stated that the reboot show they had pitched would be called Josh & Drake. Ultimately, the idea was shelved due to creative differences. The show's script was said to have been written by Peck. Janet stated, "Josh wrote Drake as a failed musician and Josh wrote himself as a real estate agent. OK, that's fine, but Drake is a musician in real life, so it wouldn't make sense." Bell added, "I just asked him to change a couple things and he couldn't and my wife wouldn't let me do it."

In March 2023, Cosgrove told E! News "nothing's off the table" in regards to a possible revival.

In August 2024, Bell in turn stated that he would be open to a revival reprising his starring role but with a new setting with sets of characters in a buddy comedy setting, differing from the original series.

In March 2025, Bell was interviewed by E! The Rundown, where he confirmed that there have been conversations about potentially doing something with Peck once again. This came just a few days after they reunited for Peck's Good Guys Podcast.
