= Michael Corcoran (musician) =

American musician (born 1972)

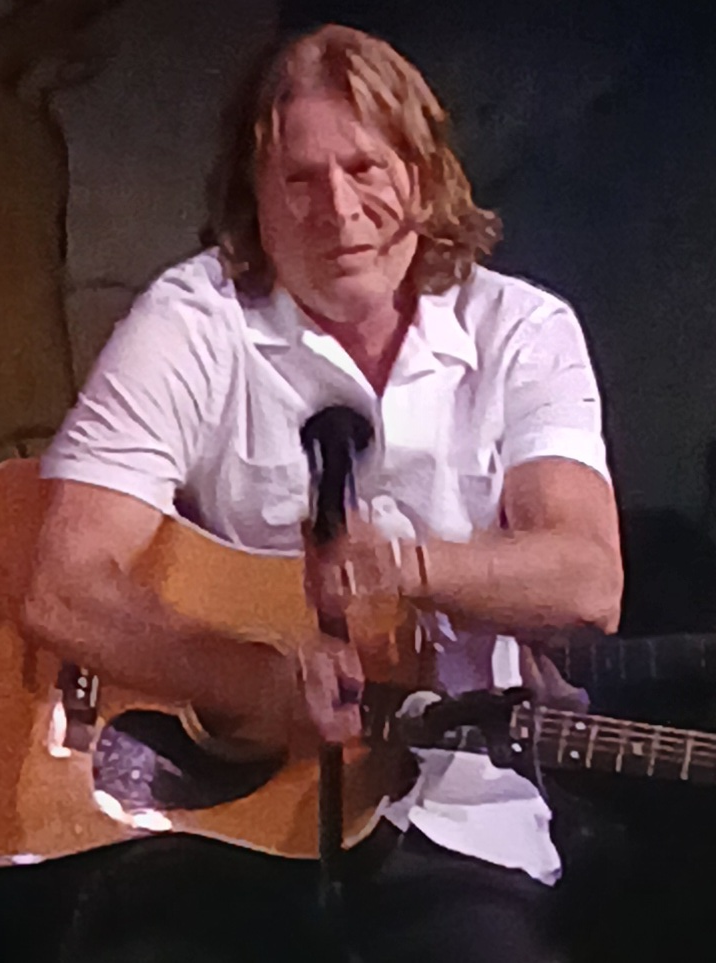
- Corcoran in 2025
- Born: Michael Thomas Corcoran; December 9, 1972 (age 53)
- Other names: Backhouse Mike; Ken Lofkoll
- Occupations: Musician; record producer; composer
- Years active: 1990–present
- Spouse: Elizabeth Gillies (m. 2020)
- Musical career
- Instruments: Vocals; guitar; piano; bass guitar; percussion

Michael Thomas Corcoran (born December 9, 1972), known professionally as Backhouse Mike or Ken Lofkoll, is an American musician, record producer, and composer. He has composed music for Nickelodeon's Drake & Josh, Zoey 101, iCarly, Victorious, The Troop, Sam & Cat, Henry Danger and Game Shakers, Disney Channel's Shake It Up and Liv and Maddie, Netflix's The Mr. Peabody & Sherman Show, and VH1's Hit the Floor.

== Career ==
From around 2003 to early 2010, he was a member of Drake Bell's band. His band Backhouse Mike, which consisted of lead singer and guitarist Jon Seminara, bassist John Charles Meyer, and keyboardist Kimberly Barnett appeared in the iCarly episode "iAm Your Biggest Fan" and the final episode of Zoey 101, "Chasing Zoey", using the name Backflesh. The band's song "Take Me Back" appears on the iCarly soundtrack.

== Personal life ==
On August 8, 2020, Corcoran married actress Elizabeth Gillies (b. 1993) at a private ceremony in New Jersey after the pair began dating in 2012, having met each other when Gillies was 16 on the Nickelodeon show Victorious. At the time, they resided in Atlanta, Georgia.

== Discography ==
=== Production discography ===
Song	Performer	Credits
"5 Fingaz to the Face"	Victorious cast	Co-writer
"The Joke Is on You"	Niki Watkins	Writer
"Break Me Down"	Drake Bell	Co-writer, producer
"Do What You Want"	Drake Bell	Co-writer, producer
"Don't Preach"	Drake Bell	Producer
"Down We Fall"	Drake Bell	Producer
"End It Good"	Drake Bell	Co-writer, producer
"Fallen for You"	Drake Bell	Co-writer, producer
"Fool the World"	Drake Bell	Vocals, co-writer, producer
"Found a Way"	Drake Bell	Producer
"Freak the Freak Out"	Victoria Justice	Co-writer, co-producer
"Get It Right"	Backhouse Mike	Vocals, co-writer, producer
"Hollywood Girl"	Drake Bell	Producer
"I Found a Way"	Drake Bell	Producer
"I Know"	Drake Bell	Co-writer, producer
"In the End"	Drake Bell	Producer
"Intro"	Drake Bell	Producer
"It's Only Time"	Drake Bell	Co-writer, producer
"Just Fine"	Backhouse Mike	Vocals, co-writer, producer
"L.A. Boyz"	Victoria Justice and Ariana Grande	Co-writer
"Leave It All to Me"	Miranda Cosgrove featuring Drake Bell	Writer, producer
"Leave It All to Shine"	Miranda Cosgrove and Victoria Justice	Co-writer
"Makes Me Happy"	Drake Bell	Co-writer, producer
"Okay"	Backhouse Mike	Vocals, co-writer, producer
"Rusted Silhouette"	Drake Bell	Co-writer, producer
"Shut Up and Dance"	Victorious cast	Co-writer
"Somehow"	Drake Bell	Producer
"Superluv!"	Shane Dawson	Co-writer, co-producer
"Take Me Back"	Backhouse Mike	Vocals, writer, producer
"Telegraph"	Drake Bell	Producer
"The Countdown"	Victorious cast	Writer, producer
"The Backhouse"	Drake Bell	Producer
"Up Periscope"	Drake Bell	Co-writer, producer
"Whatever My Love"	Mickey Drummond	Writer, producer
"More Than Me"	Elizabeth Gillies	Writer

== Awards and nominations ==
Year	Award	Category	Work	Result	Refs
2005	BMI Awards	BMI Cable Awards	Zoey 101	Won	
2006	BMI Awards	BMI Cable Awards	Drake and Josh	Won	
2009	BMI Awards	BMI Cable Awards	iCarly	Won	
2010	BMI Awards	BMI Cable Awards	iCarly	Won	
2011	ASCAP Film and Television Music Awards	Top Television Series	Shake It Up	Won	
2012	BMI Awards	BMI Cable Awards	Henry Danger	Won	
2012	BMI Awards	BMI Cable Awards	Victorious	Won	
2014	BMI Awards	BMI Cable Awards	Shake It Up	Won	
2014	BMI Awards	BMI Cable Awards	Sam & Cat	Won	
2015	BMI Awards	BMI Cable Awards	Henry Danger	Won	
2016	Motion Picture Sound Editors, USA	Golden Reel Award	The Mr. Peabody & Sherman Show	Nominated	
2017	BMI Awards	BMI Cable Awards	Henry Danger	Won	
2018	BMI Awards	BMI Cable Awards	Henry Danger	Won	
2018	Grammy Award	Best Historical Album	Washington Phillips and His Manzarene Dreams	Nominated	
