= List of The Amanda Show episodes =

The following is an episode list for the Nickelodeon sketch comedy series The Amanda Show. The series premiered on October 16, 1999, and ended on September 21, 2002, after 3 seasons and 46 episodes. Six additional "Best of..." episodes aired after 40 episodes were produced in total. Amanda Bynes and Drake Bell are the only actors to appear in every episode.

== Series overview ==
Season	Episodes	Originally released	
Season	Episodes	First released	Last released
1	13	October 16, 1999	February 19, 2000
2	17	July 15, 2000	April 7, 2001
3	10	January 19, 2002	September 21, 2002
The Best of...	6	March 23, 2002	May 18, 2002

== Episode list ==
=== Season 1 (1999–2000) ===
The first season aired from October 16, 1999, to February 19, 2000. The main cast features Amanda Bynes, Drake Bell, Nancy Sullivan, Raquel Lee, and Johnny Kassir. Recurring cast includes Andrew Hill Newman and E. E. Bell as Barney, the security guard. Every episode in this season is written by Dan Schneider, Andrew Hill Newman, John Hoberg, Christy Stratton & Jenny Kilgen. It is the only season to feature Raquel Lee and Johnny Kassir as regular cast members. The intro, only for season one, was produced by Nickelodeon Animation Studio.

No. overall	No. in season	Title	Directed by	Original release date	Prod. code
1	1	"Episode 1"	Tim O'Donnell & Ken Whittingham	October 16, 1999	101
Cold Opening: The episode starts as a crowd of fans trying to get into The Amanda Show, and Penelope Taynt, an Amanda fanatic who puts the word "please" at the end of almost every sentence, would do anything to meet Amanda. Meanwhile, Amanda makes her entrance via helicopter, but when the pilot (played by Henry Gibson) falls asleep, Amanda jumps out of the helicopter and lands on the set.; Introduction: Josh Server and Kenan Thompson (who worked with Amanda in All That) deliver Amanda a pizza and flowers to Amanda to wish her luck on her new show and give the Swiss Man a banana nut muffin.; Pedestrian Airbag: A commercial about a special airbag that can be used by pedestrians.; Judge Trudy: Judge Trudy rules over two cases. The first has Curtis McPeen issuing a complaint against Principal Thorn, who made him stay after school for pushing his car into the swimming pool while studying flotation during science class. Claiming Curtis did it as a homework assignment for his science class, Judge Trudy finds in favor of the plaintiff and Principal Thorn ends up thrown in the leopard cage when he does not have $85,000 to pay the fine. The second one had an unnamed girl issuing a complaint against her parents after she played baseball in the house and her parents told her never to do it again. Upon hearing what the girl's parents did, Judge Trudy quickly says that what the parents did was unreasonable and declares that it is "time for butt-shutting", before pulling a lever and sending the parents down a trap door that was under them.; Stop Motion Amanda: Amanda imagines herself battling her school teacher Miss Yumbo, getting the teacher trapped in the globe and trampled by sheep.; The Klutzes: A family whose members always break things and say "Not a problem" when it comes to them at home.; Cynthia Worthington: Cynthia Worthington is on a date in a fancy restaurant where she does rude things at the table, much to her boyfriend's disgust.; Mother Caboose: We hear a poem by Mother Caboose about a girl named Katie Beth Sue and the way she is described, but before she could even finish the poem, she began to cough and the skit ends with Mother Caboose falling out of her chair.; Penelope Taynt: Penelope steals part of Amanda's room and shows Drake and Raquel her website before being dragged away by two security guards.; Closing: Amanda names all 50 states backwards while punching an astronaut.
2	2	"Episode 2"	Ken Whittingham & Tim O'Donnell	October 23, 1999	102
Cold Opening: The show opens as Amanda is not on the guest list for some reason so she has to fight three security guards to get through.; Introduction: Amanda asks questions with the people calling her cell phone to ask her.; Meatloaf Crunch: A commercial about a meatloaf-themed cereal.; Jack and Jake: Jack (Amanda Bynes) and Jake (Raquel Lee), the two least successful bullies in school, are trying to cause up trouble, but none of their pranks work.; Stop Motion Amanda: Amanda has a date with a boy with a huge pimple and somehow falls in love with it.; Nurse Zelda: Nurse Zelda treats various minor injuries in the classroom.; The Simians: We meet a half-ape weird family with two kids who has a father who is an ape and a mother who is a human former explorer.; Mr. Oldman: A red-haired girl (Amanda Bynes) has some fun with a prank call to Mr. Oldman (Dan Schneider) which involves a cheese delivery.; Penelope Taynt: Penelope shows her website to a fellow audience member. As she is about to meet Amanda, a fat guy with a bowl of soup suddenly sits on her, blocking her view of the show.; Closing: Amanda has a stunt double juggles three clubs while balancing a large ladder on her face. After Amanda leaves, Penelope attempts to follow Amanda, but the security guards prevent her.
3	3	"Episode 3"	Virgil L. Fabian, Ken Whittingham & Rich Correll	October 30, 1999	103
Cold Opening: Amanda, Drake and Raquel are eating. Drake has the lobster which makes the Dancing Lobsters very mad enough to leave the room.; Introduction: Amanda tries to open the show but gets interrupted by a box, which contains Penelope. Her scheme still does not work because Amanda has left to get her crowbar when she busts out of the box.; Call Zap: A commercial about the latest telephone component that can electrify prank callers.; The Wrestlebergs: We are introduced to another freaky family called The Wrestlebergs. They are obsessed with wrestling and have a family referee in the house.; Stop Motion Amanda: Amanda plays with her dog Dumples.; The Girls' Room: We go to The Girls' Room, which takes place in a girls' bathroom and stars teenagers Amber (Amanda Bynes) the most popular girl in school, a bad girl named Sheila (Raquel Lee), an exchange student from Tennessee named Tammy (Jamie Snow), and a stupid girl named Debbie (Jenna Morrison) as they talk about a pop quiz they just had conducted by Miss Yumbo. Then they talk about Josh Elliott who does not love either of them causing Sheila to give him a swirly.; Hillbilly Moment: Two hillbillies named Lula Mae (Amanda Bynes) and Eenis (Drake Bell), who are always telling ridiculous knock-knock jokes where the knock knock joke involves Lula Mae hitting Eenis in the head with a rag doll.; Smelling Bee: This sketch involves its contestants identifying the smell while blindfolded.; Totally Kyle: This sketch features Kyle Rostensan (Drake Bell), a laid back hippie surfer who tells his story of the time he went to his grandmother's house and how his grandmother made oatmeal for breakfast.; Penelope Taynt: Penelope tries to break into Amanda's dressing room and meets Jennifer, the costume designer. Just as she is about to break in, Amanda opens the door unknowingly knocking Penelope out in the process.; Closing: Amanda invites everyone to her house for dinner. After they all leave, Penelope gets to the stage and runs out of the studio when she realizes what has happened from the janitor.
4	4	"Episode 4"	Ken Whittingham & Rich Correll	November 6, 1999	104
Cold Opening: It starts off with Amanda practicing dancing with the Dancing Lobsters and when she leaves, Penelope disguises herself as one of the Dancing Lobsters and joins their dance, but a female guard appears and takes her away.; Introduction: Amanda solves problems of the audience including a boy who always wanted a little sister, a girl who is thirsty so Amanda uses a bow and arrow to poke a hole through her can of soda and a man whose lawn mower will not start because a banjo is stuck inside.; Homework Hut: A commercial about a delivery place that delivers homework of any kind.; Hillbilly Moment: Lula Mae's knock knock joke involves hitting Eenis in the head with a fish.; Blockblister: Blockblister is a store which is owned by the foreign Blokey family with weird accents and always give the customers homemade spoofs of the actual movie made by the family. A woman is upset that she got Star Wars Episode I: The Vantom Menace and The Wizard of Voz, and a girl is angry that she got Austin Powders who ends up blowing a raspberry at the Blokey Family as payment.; Stop Motion Amanda: Amanda's bath keeps getting disrupted when she keeps finding her brother's stuff in the bathtub up to the point where it is discovered that her brother's great white shark is in the bathtub.; Judge Trudy: The courtroom of Judge Trudy starts with the Halloween edition. The first one has Shelly Barnes issuing a complaint against Mrs. Shane who gave her an apple instead of candy when she was out trick or treating. Despite Mrs. Shane's insistence that fruit is healthier than candy, Judge Trudy retorts by saying that Mrs. Shane might as well have given Shelly a load of broccoli, finds in favor of the plaintiff and confiscates Mrs. Shane's dress when she does not have the fine money of $4.6 million. The second one has an unnamed kid (most likely Kyle Rostensan) issuing a complaint against a man who snapped at him and his friends for egging his house. Despite the man's insistence that the kid is a nasty hooligan, Judge Trudy dismisses his words by claiming that the kid egged his house because he was simply trying to make the man an omelet, finds in favor of the plaintiff and has the bailiff put the man over his shoulders and spin him around until he is very uncomfortable.; Hillbilly Moment: Lula Mae's knock knock joke involves hitting Eenis in the head with a cucumber.; Penelope Taynt: Penelope shows the security guard her website, but this is just a distraction to escape.; Totally Kyle: Kyle Rostensan tells his story about the time when he found a rock in his driveway and took it to his room.; The Literals: The Literals are a family who understands things exactly how they sound when they show up at the house of their new neighbors.; Closing: Amanda and the Dancing Lobsters show their dances they have practiced earlier. Penelope joins in as well dressed as a Dancing Lobster, but is chased away by security guards.
5	5	"Episode 5"	Rich Correll, Ken Whittingham & Virgil L. Fabian	November 13, 1999	105
Cold Opening: Amanda rides an elevator and there are floors with many weird and unusual scenes where characters of the same theme ride with her. She reaches the 24th floor, the floor of her studio, but she suddenly forgets her purse and has to ride down all the floors to her dressing room to get it back.; Introduction: Amanda attempts to introduce the show, but many people interrupt her saying which floor this is until Andrew Keegan asks where the bowling alley is. When Andrew enters, he gets a standing ovation from the screaming crowd.; Remote Control Underpants: A commercial for remote control underpants.; Hillbilly Moment: Lula Mae's knock knock joke involves hitting Eenis in the head with a witch broom and later a beaver.; Mr. Gullible: Mr. Gullible, a substitute teacher who is very gullible, comes to teach at history class and is tricked by his students into doing stuff that the students claimed their regular teacher did.; Stop Motion Amanda: Amanda has trouble cleaning up her very messy bedroom.; Penelope Taynt: Penelope sneaks onto the set of The Amanda Show where Johnny and Drake are in the middle of a pirate skit and shows them her website.; Totally Kyle: Kyle discusses the time when he walked to school and notices a dead bird.; Scooper Dooper: We visit Doreen and her dad at a restaurant which serves really gross and odd ice cream flavors like Rainbow Slime, Poisonous Chip, Gerbils and Cream, Mucus Pucus (made from the mucus that is sneezed out), Litterbox Bonanza, Chili Willy, and Lobster Tackle (which causes a Dancing Lobster to tackle the consumer). When a boy orders an ice cream called Spider Crunch (which contains actual spiders), he shouts for a health inspector who arrives and states that there are only five spiders in the Spider Crunch causing Doreen to add some more. Doreen and her dad then give the health inspector an ice cream cone on the house with the flavor being Cookies and Dynamite (which explodes the moment the health inspector leaves the restaurant).; Closing: Amanda presents the audience awards including best laughter, least intelligent audience member, and the person who came from the furthest planet.
6	6	"Episode 6"	Virgil L. Fabian & Rich Correll	November 20, 1999	106
Cold Opening: Penelope tries to break into Amanda's dressing room by sitting in a cannon and firing herself. Meanwhile, Drake sings a song to Amanda, and as she leaves to get her makeup touched up, Penelope lands exactly in her room, but only with Drake inside.; Introduction: When Amanda gets to the stage, she tells a joke but the audience does not understand a word she says because they do not speak English, so she has to spend her time teaching them.; Egg Splat: A commercial about the Egg Splat.; So You Wanna Win Five Dollars: There is a tense game of So You Wanna Win Five Dollars with Marcy Stimple (Nancy Sullivan) and Kyle Rostensan as contestants. On Marcy Stimple's turn, she proves to be too hyperactive and misses her chance to answer the question which had Andrew Johnson as the answer to the question about the 17th President of the United States. On Kyle Rostensan's turn, he gets the answers to every question wrong stating that 7 is a color, Andrew Johnson is a number, way hot is the opposite of hot, R-A-D-I-O is how you spell "paper", 5 + 3 is Australia, false is what planet he lives on, and so many things is what the matter is with him.; Stop Motion Amanda: Amanda fights with her broccoli.; Totally Kyle: Kyle Rostensan introduces Blockblister.; Blockblister: Today, the Blokey family rip off some more customers. A girl is displeased that she rented Tidanic and a woman is upset that she got an exercise video with Blini and Biscotti saying "lie down" and "sit up" over and over and over again while eating a pizza and is offended when Blini calls her pudgy.; Hillbilly Moment: Lula Mae's knock knock joke involves hitting Eenis in the head with a large mallet.; Penelope Taynt: Johnny knocks on Amanda's dressing room door stating that they got to go. Amanda comes out and accidentally says "please." Johnny takes her bathrobe off to reveal Penelope's body and that Amanda's face is actually a mask. It's actually Penelope disguised as Amanda. She shows him her website before she is taken away by the security guards. The real Amanda arrives and Johnny tries to take her face off, but it's real. Once again, they head to the stage.; Totally Kyle: Kyle Rostensan tells his story about the time when he climbed up a steep hill and threw a frisbee very far.; Becky Swanson: A family welcomes their new babysitter (Amanda Bynes) who is "professional," but actually acts like a baby.; Closing: Penelope escapes from the security guards by disguising herself as Drake while Amanda closes the show. After Amanda leaves, Penelope runs to the stage in a Drake mask. The real Drake arrives with the security guards and shows them the person that's not him and they run to investigate. The fake Drake takes the mask off to reveal Penelope, who gets chased around by them.
7	7	"Episode 7"	Virgil L. Fabian, Rich Correll, Bruce Gowers & Tim O'Donnell	January 8, 2000	107
Cold Opening: Penelope carries over 50 phones with her so she can try to win a dinner with Amanda in a radio contest.; Introduction: Amanda teaches Regan Burns how to perform karate.; Meatloaf Crunch: The second airing of this commercial.; Judge Trudy: Judge Trudy rules over two cases. The first one has Jason Fima issuing a complaint against his parents who cut his allowance from $20 to $19 after he sold their house to circus people in order to raise money to go to a theme park called Doozy Land (while taking 30 of his friends in a limousine). While the parents say they did this to save money to get another house, Judge Trudy declares that claim irrelevant, finds in favor of the plaintiff and sentences Mr. and Mrs. Fima to partake in a cage match against two professional wrestlers. The second one has Amy Drummel issuing a complaint against her mother who sent her to her room when she refused to kiss her Aunt Sophie (who was also present in the courtroom's audience). Despite her mother insisting she did not do anything wrong and should win this case, Judge Trudy refuses to listen and finds in favor of the plaintiff, before sentencing Mrs. Drummel to a week locked up in a box with two contagious sick people.; Stop Motion Amanda: Amanda is cruising through space where she keeps colliding with large objects.; The Girls' Room: Sheila, Tammy, and Debbie are voting for Amber for class president. When Caroline has not decided who she is voting for, Sheila gives her a swirlie and finally gets her to vote for Amber. Amber's rival Danielle Spencer is also running for president and mentions that a third candidate named Jamie Bradford has joined the election. When Amber had Shelia bring Jamie to the Girls' Room, the girls are surprised that Jamie is actually a boy. Danielle Spencer and Amber ultimately drop out of the race and give the support to Jamie Bradford.; Penelope Taynt: In a follow-up to the cold opening, Penelope makes sure that the operator directs the radio's calls to her.; Totally Kyle: Kyle Rostensan tells his story about the time when he tried to ask a girl out for a date.; Souper Dooper: We pay another visit to Doreen and her dad at their restaurant, which sells weird and disgusting soups this time. The soups they sell consist of Foot Fungus Chowder, Toilet Chowder, Tomato Garbage, Noodles and Poodles (where poodles are the main ingredient), Underwear Chowder (the underwear in question belonged to Doreen's dad), Pee Soup (which Doreen's dad made himself), Back Hair Soup (made fresh by Doreen's grandpa), and Lincoln Punch (which causes Abraham Lincoln to appear and punch the consumer).; Closing: As Amanda closes the show, Penelope wins the contest. However, the radio phones her back and since she has over 50 phones in her room, she does not know which phone to pick up.
8	8	"Episode 8"	Bruce Gowers, Virgil L. Fabian, Rich Correll & Tim O'Donnell	January 15, 2000	108
Cold Opening: Today, Penelope wakes up from her bad dream with her parents (who are also adding "please" into their sentences) introduce a surprise visitor from The Amanda Show, Joe the camera man.; Introduction: Amanda is interrupted by an audience member who cannot listen to LFO's CD. Amanda solves the problem by bringing on the band themselves!; Pedestrian Airbag: The second airing of this commercial.; Mr. Gullible: Mr. Gullible comes to science class and gets tricked by his students once again.; Stop Motion Amanda: Amanda attempts to cook fudge brownies by mixing sugar, eggs, milk from a cow, chocolate milk from a brown cow and puts on a wedding dress. Her All That castmate Danny Tamberelli appears in this sketch.; Hillbilly Moment: Lula Mae's knock knock joke involves hitting Eenis in the head with a bowling pin.; Penelope Taynt: As LFO prepares to perform, Penelope meets them. She shows them her website before taking her leave.; Totally Kyle: Kyle Rostensan tells his story about the time when he saw an airplane which he mistook for a shooting star.; LFO performance: LFO performs the song "Girl on TV" for Amanda. Drake, Raquel, and the Dancing Lobsters dance with them.; Procrastinator: The Procrastinator is a lazy super-heroine who wants to play rather than do her duty, saying she'll do it "EVENTUALLY!"; Closing: The Dancing Lobsters invite Amanda and LFO to a party.
9	9	"Episode 9"	Virgil L. Fabian, Rich Correll & Bruce Gowers	January 22, 2000	109
Cold Opening: Raquel gets two pieces of fan mail and Drake also gets one, but it is asking for an autograph picture from the Dancing Lobsters.; Introduction: Amanda performs a magic trick where she tries to pull a can of ravioli out of a hat but ends up pulling a rabbit out of the hat. When Amanda leaves to go check the spell for that, Penelope's head emerges from the hat stating that she's got Amanda's ravioli only for the hat she is in to be taken away by the security guards.; Sick Popples: A commercial about popsicles that induce sickness on anyone that wants to get out of going to school. The flavors include Chickenpox Cherry, Pneumonia Orange, Sore Throat Grape, and New Measles Mango.; Judge Trudy: Judge Trudy has a date with a young man named Alex in a restaurant along with his parents David and Lorraine. This date soon turns into a case when Judge Trudy reveals that she is not pleased with the fact that last week, David and Lorraine grounded Alex when he "borrowed" their car and drove through a busy mall (which resulted in the destruction of Ambercrombie and most of Fitch); Alex's grounding disrupted Trudy's plans to go out with him. Judge Trudy finds this case in favor of Alex for $22,000. When the parents do not have the money for the fine, Judge Trudy has the bailiff pour a man's plate of lasagna down David's pants and then has the bailiff scream loudly in Lorraine's face.; Mr. Oldman: Mr. Oldman receives another prank call revolving around him winning a grand prize of a cordless pig.; When Cheerleaders Attack: The documentary program where we see innocent people attacked by cheerleaders dancing and hurting people with pom poms. The victims include a boy and girl having lunch at a diner and a man named Mr. Nussbaum on his way home from the grocery store.; Hillbilly Moment: Lula Mae's knock knock joke involves hitting Eenis in the head with a steering wheel.; Stop Motion Penelope: Penelope has a stop motion dream where she has won the award for the Best Website in the World presented by Whoopi Goldberg.; Totally Kyle: Kyle Rostensan tells his story about the time when he saw a movie involving a big lizard eating someone.; The Castaways: A family gets stranded on an island that is actually populated.; Closing: Amanda calls in Johnny and Raquel to help her do a magic trick that involves sawing Johnny in half where an audience member takes the bottom half of Johnny home with him. After Amanda leaves, Penelope arrives and she and Johnny call for her, but Johnny wants his socks back.
10	10	"Episode 10"	Virgil L. Fabian, Bruce Gowers, Rich Correll & Mary Schmid	January 29, 2000	110
Cold Opening: Penelope has stolen the A of the AMANDA letters in the Amanda Show stage, which makes it The MANDA Show.; Introduction: Amanda discovers that her co-stars, a Dancing Lobster, and three cameramen are wearing the same dress as her.; Homework Hut: The second airing of this commercial.; Sushi Dooper: It's time to visit Sushi Dooper with Doreen and her dad, which now serves disgusting and strange sushi like live fish on an unfolded sushi wrapper, Fingernail Roll, Raccoon Roll, Thumbtack Roll, Phlegm Roll, Hairball Roll, and Samurai Roll (which causes a samurai to attack the consumer).; Stop Motion Amanda: Amanda's dad buys a new TV set that emits various things that are mentioned when Amanda watches it and it soon gets stolen by a burglar.; Parent-Teacher Conference: Kyle Rostensan's teacher was displeased on how he wrote his book report of Charlotte's Web, and it said "Charlotte was a spider dude. She like, had a web. Spiders are totally rad. I like spiders. I also like doughnuts." When she has brought his parents in to discuss this, she is shocked to learn that they (and Kyle's grandparents) are where Kyle gets his surfer-like speech and attitude from.; Hillbilly Moment: Lula Mae's knock knock joke involves hitting Eenis in the head with a gila monster.; Penelope Taynt: Penelope decides to return the "A" to her house, but the taxi driver has trouble getting it in the back of a taxi.; Totally Kyle: Kyle Rostensan tells his story about the time when he woke up with messy hair.; Snipatorium: A hairdresser store that causes more harm to the guests than good.; Mr. Oldman: Mr. Oldman receives another prank call, this time from the Lumina Lumina Farm Company wondering when he wants his zebras delivered.; Closing: Amanda plays tennis with the audience. Upon leaving, Amanda notices the "A" is missing and Penelope has the "A" on her motorcycle as she drives during the credits.
11	11	"Episode 11"	Virgil L. Fabian, Rich Correll & Mary Schmid	February 5, 2000	111
Cold Opening: Penelope uses a homemade remote-controlled robot to infiltrate The Amanda Show. Inside the van with her is her brother Preston, who will not stop asking for a sandwich.; Introduction: The show celebrates Amanda's birthday (but it's not actually her birthday).; Remote Control Pizza: A commercial about remote-controlled pizzas.; The Klutzes: The Klutzes Family visits the Museum of Irreplaceable Items and end up causing problems which involves breaking the display case of objects from an Indian Burial Ground, breaking the Teenysaurus skeleton (with the dinosaur being the only one of its kind), damaging glass objects made by a young Abraham Lincoln, and tossing the indestructible armor that was worn by George Washington out the window.; Stop Motion Amanda: Amanda plays fetch with her dog Scooper who keeps fetching the wrong things instead of the ball.; The Girls' Room: Amber, Sheila, Tammy, and Debbie host the annual "Girls' Choice Awards." The first award deals with the "Worst Cafeteria Food Served" with Pork Loaf winning over Sloppy Joes, Noodle Goo, and Fishburgers with the cafeteria lady Miss Shapein accepting the award on the Pork Loaf's behalf. The second award deals with the Best Cable TV Show with "The Girls' Room" winning over "Good Morning Chess Club," "Cooking with Miss Shapein," and "Locker Room Hygiene with Coach Squaddle" much to the objection of Coach Squaddle. The final award deals with the "Most Popular Girl in School" where Tina Capone wins over Amber (who was nominated three times). When Sheila gives Tina Capone a swirlie, which means that Tina cannot accept the final award, Amber is happy to accept the final award on her behalf.; Hillbilly Moment: Lula Mae's knock knock joke involves hitting Eenis in the head with a skunk.; Penelope Taynt: Penelope's robot continues its infiltration until it runs into the Dancing Lobsters.; Totally Kyle: Kyle Rostensan tells his story about the time when he saw a TV show that he liked which had a funny guy and a dog with a weird bark, and he wanted to watch it again, but forgot what channel it was on.; When Old Ladies Attack: A documentary where we see elderly women abuse innocent people with purses and umbrellas. The victims include a man washing his hands in the men's room (having just finished his lunch) and a loner woman on her way home from the movies.; Closing: Amanda shakes the hands of everyone in the audience. When Penelope's robot follows Amanda to her limo, the robot ends up getting run over and destroyed when the limo backs up.
12	12	"Episode 12"	Bruce Gowers, Rich Correll, Virgil L. Fabian, Mary Schmid & Ken Whittingham	February 12, 2000	112
Cold Opening: Amanda discovers that there is no audience to hear her opening joke because she has arrived too early.; Introduction: While Amanda introduces the show, firefighters, nuns, and Vitamin C come onto the stage. Amanda invites Vitamin C to perform on the show, and she agrees.; Call Zap: The second airing of this commercial.; Judge Trudy: Judge Trudy rules over two cases. The first one has Ross Appleton issuing a complaint against a zookeeper who kicked him out of the zoo after he released all the zoo animals from their cages enough for them to escape into the city (with some of the incidents including a hippopotamus crushing a taxi cab and a zebra tinkling on a taco stand). Claiming that Ross just thought that the animals needed a little exercise, Judge Trudy finds in favor of the plaintiff and orders the bailiff to put an angry chipmunk down the zookeeper's pants when he refuses to pay Ross the fine money of $22,000. The second one deals with Loretta Stanton issuing a complaint against her mother who threw away her paints after she painted her face, hair and other parts all orange while she was taking a nap. Judge Trudy declares Mrs. Stanton's orange look an improvement, and after quickly arguing back and forth with Mrs. Stanton, telling her to "look", while Mrs. Stanton keeps shouting "no", Judge Trudy then presses a button, causing a large boulder to fall and crush Mrs. Stanton, telling her, "You should've looked", before finding in favor of the plaintiff and dismissing the case.; Rock-A-Bye Ralph: Amanda cannot sleep at night, so her parents give her a doll named Rock-a-Bye Ralph that will not keep quiet. Eventually, Amanda calls upon her dog Scooper to dispose of Rock-a-Bye Ralph.; Penelope Taynt: Penelope uses a net trap to catch Amanda, but instead catches Vitamin C. Penelope shows her website before fleeing.; Totally Kyle: Kyle Rostensan tells his story about the time when he could not find a cordless phone.; Vitamin C performance: One of the Dancing Lobsters has a cold. So Amanda says "You need your daily dose of Vitamin C!" as guest singer Vitamin C herself sings her hit single "Me, Myself, and I" for Amanda and the audience.; Mr. Oldman: Mr. Oldman gets another prank call from "the lady of the house" involving her acting as his cousin wanting to get his dog a bath.; Closing: Amanda hosts a talent contest.
13	13	"Episode 13"	Virgil L. Fabian, Rich Correll & Mary Schmid	February 19, 2000	113
Cold Opening: Penelope and Preston try to clone Amanda by using a toenail they found in the trash can. Unfortunately, it ends up being Drake's toenail.; Introduction: Amanda watches a boy while his mother is in the bathroom, a dog while its owner puts more money in the parking meter, some prisoners while the warden takes a bath, and a grizzly bear.; Meatloaf Crunch: The third airing of this commercial.; Totally Kyle: Kyle Rostensan introduces Blockblister.; Blockblister: Today the Blokey family rip off the customers with homemade spoofs. A girl is unhappy that she got Screamings and pays them with an island curse, a woman is disappointed that she got Star Drek and says "Live long and suffer," and a man is upset that he got The Brady Brunch and ends up knocking himself out.; Wanda the Witch: Stanley has a problem at school with a new student named Wanda, who acts and looks like a wicked witch. Wanda casts several spells on the students, turning Melanie into a frog, then Joey into a bowl of chili, making the classroom windy to prevent a pop quiz, and turning the other four classmates into lamps. After each incident, Stanley attempts to rat Wanda out to the teacher Miss Carter, but she refuses to believe him, due to Wanda playing innocent and Miss Carter being obvious to Wanda's spells. In the end, after Wanda flies on a broom, she turns Stanley into a sheep and Miss Carter into a monkey.; Hillbilly Moment: Lula Mae's knock knock joke involves hitting Eenis in the head with a crocodile bone.; Penelope Taynt: Penelope hypnotizes the prop guy into letting her take the props from the show and help her carry the props to Penelope's bike.; Totally Kyle: Kyle Rostensan tells his story about the time when he had a lucky sock and lost it while at his friend Tofer's house.; Melody and Thad: Melody Warble (Amanda Bynes) and Thad (Drake Bell) go to a restaurant to sing for the people, but their songs, "Eatin' in a Restaurant", "Birthday Rap" and "The Bald Song" seem to offend and annoy the people who are eating.; Closing: Penelope hypnotizes the prop guy into thinking the security guard insulted his mother by saying she was a large cow resulting them arguing. When Penelope leaves, the hypnosis wears off, and they state that they "saw nothing".

=== Season 2 (2000–01) ===
The second season aired from July 15, 2000, to April 7, 2001. The main cast features Amanda Bynes, Drake Bell, Nancy Sullivan and newcomer Josh Peck. Recurring cast includes Andrew Hill Newman, E. E. Bell, Maureen McCormick, Danny Bonaduce, Travis Tedford, Lara Jill Miller, Lauren Petty, Matthew Botuchis, Molly Orr and Taran Killam of "Moody's Point". Every episode in this season is written by Dan Schneider, Andrew Hill Newman, John Hoberg and Steven Molaro.

No. overall	No. in season	Title	Directed by	Original release date	Prod. code
14	1	"Episode 14"	Rich Correll, Virgil L. Fabian & Ken Whittingham	July 15, 2000	201
Cold Opening: Penelope bribes Barney the security guard with pizza to get her in the audience.; Introduction: Amanda is trying to do her introduction, but is distracted by square dancers on the roof.; Popper Pants: A commercial about popcorn that you can make in your pants.; Moody's Point Trailer: A trailer for an upcoming sketch that will air next week.; Blockblister: The Blokey family doesn't see anything wrong with their homemade videos. A boy complains that his mother rented Snowy Day for him and demands a refund before running off and a man is upset that his step-nephew rented for him Mission: Impossible (which isn't a DVD or a record, it's a "DVP"!). (Note: Mission: Impossible is the first movie in the Blockblister sketches to not have a parody name.); Stranded: Tony Pajamas, Mr. Gullible, Debbie, Judge Trudy, the Bailiff and a Dancing Lobster are locked in a 1971 luxury convertible in a parking lot in downtown Oklahoma. If any of them gets out or is voted out, they lose. Debbie was voted out of the car. The progress occurs until only Judge Trudy and the Bailiff are left and end up driving the convertible away when they discovered that keys were left in the ignition, along with the million dollars in the trunk.; Crazy Courtney: Courtney annoys a movie patron while at the movies. (Note: The KaBlam! episode "Won't Stick to Most Dental Work!" can be heard playing at the movie theater); Closing: Amanda shows the audience how many marshmallows she can fit into her mouth. The end result ends up being 275. After Amanda leaves, Penelope tries to confiscate some of the marshmallows only for her to be chased by Barney and Kathy.
15	2	"Episode 15"	Rich Correll, Virgil L. Fabian, Tim O'Donnell & Ken Whittingham	July 29, 2000	202
Cold Opening: Amanda plays in a pool of mud, but before the show starts, she has to get cleaned up. You've heard of a car wash? Well, here is star wash!; Introduction: A kid's great-grandmother can't hear Amanda and ends up moving close onto the stage.; LunchBay.com: A website where you can buy others lunch and sell your own.; Judge Trudy: There's more courtroom action with Judge Trudy. The first case deals with Marcus McOliver issuing a complaint against his dad who told him to stop copying everything he says. Judge Trudy turns the tables on Mr. McOliver by also copying everything he says, before finding in favor of the plaintiff and having Mr. McOliver be chased by an unpredictable man in a gorilla suit. The second case deals with Gordy Moller issuing a complaint against his teacher, Miss Burkel, who gave him detention for gluing stuff to her body as part of his collage project. Judge Trudy shows no concern over Miss Burkel, allowing Gordy and the courtroom audience to point and laugh at her, finds in favor of the plaintiff and sells Miss Burkel to the highest bidder in her courtroom.; Moody's Point: In the first episode, it's Moody Fallon's birthday and she is coping with the loss of her mother, who a locket her father gives her belonged to. When Spaulding gets Moody a "Happy Birthday" balloon as a birthday gift, she starts acting weird and she pops the balloon and hysterically runs off, when she runs into Sternum, who comforts her. Moody later confides to her friends that her mother is stranded in a runaway hot air balloon, and so every time she sees a balloon, it reminds her of how her mother disappeared six years ago.; Totally Kyle: Kyle Rostensan tells about his visit to the zoo.; Closing: Amanda walks on a man's back to deal with his back problem, but it still feels sore and he needs someone heavier. Amanda calls out for Alfonso, who would like to do the honors in helping him out.
16	3	"Episode 16"	Virgil L. Fabian & Ken Whittingham	August 12, 2000	203
Cold Opening: Amanda has come down with a cold. Penelope plans to obtain Amanda's used tissues and orange juice in order to catch Amanda's cold.; Introduction: Amanda joins a boy in the search for a lost paper clip.; Allowance Doubler: A commercial about a device that can double one's allowance.; The Girls' Room: Amber, Sheila, Tammy, and Debbie hold auditions to add a new girl to their group. The first girl is Lauren Thomas (played by Tangi Miller) who is asked by Sheila why Amber is popular. Lauren doesn't know who Amber is and is rejected. The second girl is Terry Garner (played by Shiri Appleby) who is asked by Tammy what is her favorite thing to do. Terry is too talkative and is rejected. The third girl is Penny Nickel who is asked by Debbie what one item she would bring if she was stranded on a deserted island. Penny couldn't make up her mind on what item to bring and is frightened into the bathroom stall by Sheila.; Amanda's Jacuzzi: Amanda interviews with Babe Ruth (played by Bob Papenbrook).; Tony Pajamas: Tony Pajamas babysits a young girl after disposing of her babysitter Jessica who hasn't paid him back. The Al Dente brothers attack with eggs.; Hillbilly Moment: Lula Mae's knock-knock joke involves hitting Eenis in the head with a fire extinguisher.; Penelope Taynt: Penelope catches Amanda's cold.; Totally Kyle: Kyle Rostensan talks about his encounter with a spider.; Mr. Oldman: Mr. Oldman receives another prank call revolving around his doctor telling him about the results of his clam test.; Closing: Amanda wraps up the show with a girl (played by Ashley Tisdale) from the audience giving her advice on how to cure her cold. As the show closes, Penelope comes up and realizes she and Amanda both have a cold until she is chased by a female security guard.
17	4	"Episode 17"	Virgil L. Fabian & Ken Whittingham	August 26, 2000	204
Cold Opening: Amanda and her friends watch Drake as he sleeps, dreaming about The Drake Show!; Introduction: Amanda is told by Kathy that the unconscious guy didn't show up for the doctor sketch and goes to find another unconscious guy to take his place.; The Boost: A commercial where the player can use a signal to call the Boost to help children deal with anything that is out of reach.; The Klutzes: The Klutzes open a restaurant where they continue to klutz it out.; Amanda's Jacuzzi: Amanda interviews Frankenstein's monster.; Hillbilly Moment: Eenis and Lula Mae reach out and hit various people with different objects in an Outdoors Hillbilly Moment.; Penelope Taynt: Penelope has a fight with another teenager named Daphne (played by Ashley Tisdale) for the title of Amanda's number one fan, please.; Mr. Gullible: Mr. Gullible is tricked by the students into doing things that are not part of the fire drill.; Closing: Amanda shows the audience how long she can hold her breath. Drake holds a contest between Penelope and Daphne to see who is Amanda's number one fan.
18	5	"Episode 18"	Tim O'Donnell, Rich Correll & Virgil L. Fabian	September 9, 2000	205
Cold Opening: Penelope's quest to find Amanda by moving through the ventilation system finds her turning up in somebody's toilet.; Introduction: Amanda tries to do a trampoline act that would involve her landing in a glass of water until disrupted by a blackout caused by Drake and Nancy while using hair dryers to roast weenies, as they are not allowed to make a fire in the studio.; Pass The Skunk!: A commercial about a game in which players pass a skunk around until the music stops. The player holding it when the music ends gets sprayed.; So You Wanna Win Five Dollars: Tony Pajamas and Judge Trudy are contestants. Tony had thought the show would provide catering and ends up using his "Phone a Friend" to call his friend Tommy in the pizza business during a question. Judge Trudy gets the answers right until it comes to the inventor of the bathtub, which was actually invented by Warren B. Tubbs instead of Walter B. Tubbs. Judge Trudy claims she's right and finds the round in favor of herself and dismisses the game as Tina storms off the stage in annoyance.; Moody's Point: Moody returns a video at 5:01 one minute late when pointed out by the clerk (played by Curtis Armstrong). She is worried about what her father would say if he found out. Meanwhile, Brie tries out for the cheerleader squad where its coach (played by Patrick Bristow) makes his picks.; Totally Kyle: Kyle Rostensan talks about the time when his friend had a car that he couldn't drive.; Closing: Amanda discovers why the lights keep going out when she tries to swallow a tricycle whole. She finds Drake floating over a bunch of hair dryers as a prank done by the Dancing Lobsters, and unplugs the hair dryers to get him down.
19	6	"Episode 19"	Rich Correll & Virgil L. Fabian	September 23, 2000	206
Cold Opening: While Barney is reading a book, Penelope uses her apple cannon to knock him out. She fails two times but eventually gets him on the third try.; Introduction: Amanda wants to make the world a better place, so she sets out to get kids to do what parents want, and vice versa.; Super Spitballer 5000: A commercial about a cannon that shoots rocky spit-wads.; Blockblister: The Blokey family deals with complaints about their movie renditions. A woman and her nephew are upset that they rented The Nubby Professor and a nun complains about George from the Jungle that she rented for the orphanage.; Crime Fighting Cheerleaders: We meet the "Crime-Fighting Cheerleaders", who attempt to foil the attempt of two thugs to rob a house.; Hillbilly Moment: Lula Mae's knock-knock joke involves hitting Eenis in the head with a cappuccino machine.; Melody and Thad: Melody and Thad sing some rather offensive songs at a wedding reception.; Closing: Amanda is visited by a man selling pretzels. Amanda buys 400 pretzels and gets a free baby.
20	7	"Episode 20"	Rich Correll, Virgil L. Fabian & Ken Whittingham	October 7, 2000	207
Cold Opening: Drake tries to get the turkey-balancing record, only to be distracted by an annoying Penelope, who demands to know where Amanda is.; Introduction: Amanda is interrupted by George W. Bush and Al Gore (not the actual people), who are running for president.; Trash Cones: A commercial about ice cream made out of trash.; The Girls' Room: Amber, Sheila, Tammy and Debbie hold a talent contest. The first act deals with Dustin Puddin trying to do a magic trick involving making a cake appear out of a hat, but it doesn't go well. Then Miss Shapein does an interpretive dance with a melon, which annoys Sheila. Kyle Rostensan tells one of his stories, which leaves the girls, except for Debbie, disgusted. As an excuse to make out with Kyle in a bathroom stall, Debbie states that she has never given a kid a swirly before.; Crazy Courtney: Crazy Courtney gets a new piano, only to drive the teacher mad.; Hilbilly Moment: Lula Mae's knock-knock joke involves hitting Eenis in the head with a fruitcake.; Penelope Taynt: Drake and his friends are watching a movie. The movie is interrupted by Penelope, since she took over the satellite. Penelope shows them her website before turning Drake off with a remote of her own. Josh and the others decide to eat a sandwich.; Amanda's Jacuzzi: Amanda interviews Santa Claus.; Closing: An audience member named Greg isn't having fun because he can't dance, so Amanda teaches him how to dance.
21	8	"Episode 21"	Rich Correll, Virgil L. Fabian & Tim O'Donnell	October 21, 2000	208
Cold Opening: Penelope's little brother Preston meets Amanda, who gives him a sandwich and takes a photo with him, which causes Penelope to get upset when she finds out about this.; Introduction: Amanda helps Drake out with his pizza problem because he's allergic to thick crust, so is Barney.; My Beautiful Big Toe: A commercial about dressing up a person's big toe.; Judge Trudy: Judge Trudy rules over two cases. The first one has Louis Holland issuing a complaint against his parents for taking the TV out of his room after he put itching powder in all their clothes (an incident which Judge Trudy finds funny), with the parents' constant itching causing Judge Trudy to have the bailiff handcuff them. Judge Trudy finds in favor of the plaintiff and sentences the parents not only to give their son a new television, but also to play dodgeball with three bitter Marines despite the fact that they are handcuffed. The second one deals with Nicky Poppadopolous issuing a complaint against his mother Polly who asked him to turn his stereo down. Due to the loud stereo damaging Polly's hearing, Judge Trudy had the bailiff interpret for her using a megaphone. Judge Trudy shows no concern to Polly's lack of hearing and finds in favor of the plaintiff, sentencing Polly to carry a very old woman piggyback for the next three years.; Moody's Point: Moody tries out for a TV commercial for the new mouthwash called Gargasol at her school and wins the part with Spaulding. When Spaulding gets injured, Sternum is cast in the lead male part. Misty has also auditioned and has developed an allergic reaction to Gargasol.; Mr. Oldman: Mr. Oldman gets another prank phone call which ends rather quickly to which he admits was pointless.; Closing: A bald guy who wants Amanda's autograph for his friend.
22	9	"Episode 22"	Rich Correll, Virgil L. Fabian & Ken Whittingham	October 28, 2000	209
Cold Opening: Amanda is searching for someone to open Josh's bag of chips.; Introduction: There's a painful moment when Amanda feels a little unwell with a pain on her side and needs some medical advice.; Little Crazy Hatman: A commercial about a Little Crazy Hatman.; Cookie Dooper: Doreen and her dad now sell strange and revolting cookies at their restaurant consisting of Electric Zaps (which is loaded with 7,000 volts of electricity), cookies with scabs (with the scabs coming from Doreen's grandpa), Oatmeal del Fuego (a cookie that contains five gallons of hot sauce), Wiggle Wafers (which have worms sticking out of them), and Refrigerator Crunch (which causes a refrigerator to fall on the consumer).; When Bradys Attack: The six kids from The Brady Bunch are attacking people in this documentary. The victims include a Chinese delivery man trying to deliver food and a mom and her two sons driving home from baseball practice. In the end, they sing "Beat On", a parody of "Keep On."; Penelope Taynt: Penelope sets out on a search for Amanda until she hears Barney and hides in the utility room. Barney stops in front of the door and takes out a pair of handcuffs stating that he got her this time. He goes inside to find Penelope until she swaps clothes with him. Amanda arrives and notices Barney in Penelope's clothes and handcuffed, but he doesn't want to talk about it and she leaves. Suddenly, two security guards approach and take Barney away, who is mistaken for Penelope.; Totally Kyle: Kyle Rostensan talks about his cousin in New Jersey....until he realizes that he has no cousin in New Jersey.; Closing: Upon answering a question, Amanda holds a contest to see which audience member looks like her. Meanwhile, Barney shows a security guard a chainsaw stating that Penelope was trying to saw a hole over Amanda's dressing room. He also finds a remote control, which belongs to her and the other security guard wonders what it's for. Penelope will show them what she does with it and Barney hands it to her. She tells them to watch closely and say "Nighty-night," and uses the device to spray sleeping gas on them, which causes them to fall asleep. At the stage, she encounters the various girls that look like Amanda and is chased by Barney and the other security guard.
23	10	"Episode 23"	Rich Correll, Virgil L. Fabian & Ken Whittingham	November 18, 2000	210
Cold Opening: Penelope tries to get into Amanda's dressing room with a cunning teddy bear disguise.; Introduction: When Amanda hears from a fan mail that a fan of hers named Russell Carter is grounded for selling his dad's car in exchange for fruit cocktail and isn't allowed to watch "The Amanda Show," she gathers Drake, Nancy, and another cast member in order to go to the Carter family's house without getting spotted by Russell's mom. They end up reenacting a moment from "The Klutzes."; Sugar Veggies: A commercial about sugar-made vegetables where a girl and her friend Julie swap out the vegetables with Sugar Veggies upon distracting the parents.; So You Wanna Win Five Dollars: Calvin Stubbs and Debbie are contestants. On Calvin's turn, he uses his Phone-a-Friend to call his dad in a question revolving around the measurements of electric currents. Unfortunately, Mr. Oldman is accidentally called costing Calvin his prize. On Debbie's turn, she ends up annoying Tina, although she does actually manage to answer her question correctly when there were 12 inches in a foot, until Mr. Oldman hits the Call Return, annoying Tina more.; Crime Fighting Cheerleaders: When two bullies rob a kid's locker and then threaten him, he calls upon the Crime Fighting Cheerleaders to stop them.; Hillbilly Moment: Lula Mae's knock knock joke involves hitting Eenis in the head with a Liberty Bell.; Penelope Taynt: Penelope heckles Drake, Josh, and Nancy of a sketch involving a family whose son is dating an alien girl named Zizquat and is displeased that Amanda isn't in this sketch. By the time Drake gets Amanda, Penelope was already removed from the set by the paramedics upon slipping on a banana peel.; Amanda's Jacuzzi: Amanda interviews Elvis Presley.; Closing: Amanda hands out $50,000 to a lucky audience member with a birthday. Amanda also allows him to marry her.
24	11	"Episode 24"	Rich Correll, Virgil L. Fabian & Tim O'Donnell	December 9, 2000	211
Cold Opening: Penelope locks an actress in a closet and tricks the dressing room woman into thinking that she's part of a sketch Amanda's playing later on. Penelope doesn't realize that she's to play the part of an Egyptian mummy. The woman puts mummy clothing on her, leaving Penelope unable to see (and unable to meet Amanda, too, since she was just in the dressing room).; Introduction: The Amanda Show gets off to a bad start today when it's opened by the wrong Amanda named Amanda Rodriguez.; Mammal-Os: A commercial about a healthy cereal with a live mammal in every box.; Crazy Courtney: Crazy Courtney sabotages a class debate against her opponent Gerald Stumford at Grandview High School.; Moody's Point: Moody is really annoyed by a first-grade kid squirting her with water. When Spaulding tries to reason with the kid, Spaulding ends up getting beaten up, which leads to a fight the next day, which is broken up by Sternum. Moody and Sternum have their first kiss. Meanwhile, Misty gives out invitations to her birthday where the only one that comes is the one-thumb janitor. They sing "Don't Go Breaking My Heart" while Spaulding is walking away heartbroken and Moody and Sternum are kissing.; Totally Kyle: Kyle Rostensan talks about the time when he mistaken his toaster for a radio.; Closing: Amanda's meat song is interrupted by the sound of a lawnmower as someone's mowing the stage.
25	12	"Episode 25"	Rich Correll & Virgil L. Fabian	December 23, 2000	212
Cold Opening: Penelope finds an easy entrance to the studios today when she falls in love with Trevor, the son of Barney the Security Guard.; Introduction: Amanda helps a guy pull out a bad tooth only for her method to accidentally decapitate him.; Popper Pants: The second airing of this commercial.; Blockblister: The Blokey Family deal with unsatisfied customers that rented from them. A girl and her babysitter were displeased that they got Face Ventura. A boy blames the Blokey family for ruining his life by giving him Tom Zawyer when he tried to watch the movie that it was spoofed from instead of reading the book for his class' book report. When the boy denies to pay them, Gnocchi calls in Blini and Biscotti's tough-looking cousin Kreblock to make him change his mind.; The Dare Show: A sister and a brother named Sharon and Toby host a show in the basement called the Dare Show, the only cable-access show where they take dares from the viewers, no matter how bad they are. The first dare is for Sharon to make hot tea with one of Toby's dirty socks, and then drink it. The second dare is for Toby to draw a mustache and glasses on his face with a permanent marker. The third dare is for Sharon to make an ice cream sundae out of herself by dumping ice cream down her shirt and covering herself in hot fudge and whipped cream. The fourth dare is for Sharon and Toby's mother to shave her head.; Hillbilly Moment: Lula Mae's knock knock joke involves hitting Eenis in the head with a severed leg.; Penelope Taynt: Penelope invades Amanda's dressing room and runs into Trevor who manages to admit his love to her. Barney arrives and is shocked to see Penelope in there. Trevor prevents him from capturing Penelope stating that she's not crazy or nutsy cuckoo and that he won't let him take her. Barney is about to capture Penelope until Trevor leaps on him and covers his eyes, then tells Penelope to make a run for it.; Amanda's Jacuzzi: Amanda's guest is Sitting Bull.; Closing: Amanda performs a magic trick that involves getting handcuffed and blindfolded where she has to escape from a box in 60 seconds. Penelope and Trevor are too busy kissing to notice Amanda leaving.
26	13	"Episode 26"	Virgil L. Fabian & Ken Whittingham	January 27, 2001	213
Cold Opening: Phillip Van Dyke from Noah Knows Best is excited to be in tonight's show with Amanda. While Amanda is called away to help get Drake's foot out of the toilet, Penelope abducts him in a plan to have Amanda come looking for him.; Introduction: Amanda finds that she has a paramedic's pager in place of her pager.; The Boost: The second airing of this commercial.; Jerky Dooper: Doreen and her dad sell disgusting and unusual jerky at their restaurant now which consist of Monkey Jerky, Rat Jerky (made from the rats that Doreen's grandpa catches in the kitchen), Skunk Butt Jerky, Porcupine Jerky, Diaper Jerky, Garbage Jerky, and Alien Abduction Jerky (which causes aliens to abduct the consumer).; Amanda's Jacuzzi: Amanda interviews Amelia Earhart.; Stranded: Crazy Courtney, Marcy Stimple, Amber, Mr. Gullible, and Eenis are stranded in a bathtub in downtown North Dakota. Amber voted herself out to get away from Eenis, who was flirting with her. The competition is fierce until only Crazy Courtney remains.; Penelope Taynt: In continuation with her plot to draw Amanda to her, Penelope has tied Phillip to a chair and makes him look at her website with Penelope's plot making him unable to appear in a hula girl-themed sketch with Amanda.; Totally Kyle: Kyle Rostensan tells about the time when he had a mosquito bite.; Closing: Phillip catches up with Amanda stating that Penelope kidnapped him and that he got away while she was fighting the security guards only to learn that the show is over. After Amanda leaves, Penelope manages to recapture Phillip.
27	14	"Episode 27"	Rich Correll & Virgil L. Fabian	February 17, 2001	214
Cold Opening: Penelope and Trevor have a picnic on the set until Barney comes along.; Introduction: Amanda starts the show by giving a big hand to just about everybody.; Super Spitballer 5000: The second airing of this commercial.; The Girls' Room: The show is coming from the Boys' Room when there is a water pipe burst in the Girls' Room. Amber has Sheila make two boys named Tad and Chuck model two dresses that were worn to last week's dance: one that was worn by Amber and one that was worn by Tina Capone. When the coach tries to restore order in the Boys' Room, he ends up getting a swirly from Sheila which he enjoys.; Amanda's Jacuzzi: Amanda interviews the Swiss Guy.; Tony Pajamas: Tony Pajamas and his girlfriend Candy Tulips have a problem at school when Tony thinks that Candy is seeing another guy. It turns out that she was with Paulie who was buying her a canoli which she mentions following the Al Dente Brothers attacking with meatballs.; Hillbilly Moment: Lula Mae's knock knock joke involves hitting Eenis in the head with a sports bra.; Penelope Taynt: Penelope is on the set of the show hanging up wanted pictures of Amanda.; Mr. Oldman: Mr. Oldman receives another prank call revolving around his credit card being charged and hears Japanese language.; Closing: A robber steals one of the cameras and Amanda pursues him.
28	15	"Episode 28"	Virgil L. Fabian & Dan Schneider	March 3, 2001	215
Cold Opening: Penelope and Preston are watching TV and Penelope thinks she's finally going to speak to Amanda when she's a guest on a phone in show, but the emergency broadcast system interrupts proceedings.; Introduction: Amanda tries to open the show, but is interrupted by dodgeballs.; LunchBay.com: The second airing of this commercial.; Judge Trudy: Judge Trudy enrolls on the first day of school where she ends up in Miss DeBoat's class. She has the students support her when it came to her not having Miss DeBoat hold a pop quiz. When a student named Rodney Rippy ends up dumping oatmeal on Miss DeBoat and she gives Rodney detention, Judge Trudy ends up initiating an emergency court session to deal with this. Judge Trudy dismisses Miss DeBoat's claims of Rodney spilling oatmeal on her and agrees with Rodney that he did this because he thought it would be funny, before finding in favor of the plaintiff and sentencing Miss DeBoat to go on a court-ordered romantic date with Janitor Jim, much to Miss DeBoat's dismay.; Moody's Point: Spaulding accidentally drops an anchor on Mr. Fallon's foot, causing him to lose a toe, and the gang gets Mr. Fallon to the hospital. Spaulding loses the toe yet it is found by Sternum. He goes to the hospital to give it to them, only to lose it again during a scuffle with a homeless guy. Meanwhile, Misty competes in the school's Knowledge Competition but a malfunction with the buzzer ends up electrocuting her and ending her up in the hospital.; Closing: It appears to be snowing in the studio and Amanda is informed by Kathy that the lighting guy Tom has really bad dandruff which would explain the "snow."
29	16	"Episode 29"	Bobby Costanzo, Virgil L. Fabian, Kevin Tracy, & Ken Whittingham	March 17, 2001	216
Cold Opening: The world's greatest ventriloquist (played by Kathie Lee Gifford) is coming on the show today, and Penelope senses a chance to get closer to Amanda, so she kidnaps her.; Introduction: Amanda's show open is interrupted by a man speaking Italian. But what in the world is he saying?; Little Crazy Hatman: The second airing of this commercial.; When School Mascots Attack: A documentary about school mascots attacking people. The victims include a couple trying to get married (the bride ironically being the same woman who got attacked by old ladies in "When Old Ladies Attack") and a pair of boy scouts on a camping trip.; Amanda's Jacuzzi: Amanda interviews Moses.; The Lucklesses: A family that always seem to have the worst luck, trying to have a nice night in their home, but always experiencing horrible luck.; Hillbilly Moment: Lula Mae's knock knock joke involves hitting Eenis in the head with a bowling ball.; Penelope Taynt: Penelope, realizing that the ventriloquist will be introduced by Amanda herself, destroys her dummy Sir Chats-a-Lot, much to the ventriloquist's shock and sadness.; Totally Kyle: Kyle Rostensan talks about the time when a string on his guitar broke.; Mr. Oldman: Mr. Oldman receives another prank call revolving around him marrying a dog.; Closing: The ventriloquist performs with Penelope as the dummy until they get in a fight.
30	17	"Episode 30"	Rich Correll, Bobby Costanzo, Virgil L. Fabian, Steve Hoefer & Ken Whittingham	April 7, 2001	217
Cold Opening/Introduction: Amanda is taking a nap today, so Drake and Josh do the audience greeting instead. Unfortunately for them, the audience only want Amanda resulting in some of the adult audience members attacking Drake and Josh thinking that they are trying to take over the show. Amanda awakens in time and learns the situation after Drake and Josh forgot to wake her and has the angry audience members continue their attack on Drake and Josh outside.; Ham: A commercial message about the many uses for Ham.; Blockblister: Blockblister rents more high quality movies to unsuspecting customers with their spoofs. A boy is angry that he rented Stuart Lipple and squeezes one of their eggs in anger before telling that he will squeeze their faces the next time he comes back and a deranged man (played by Jeremy Rowley) is furious about renting F-Men, that resulted in making him do bad things and rips off one of his arms as payment.; The Dare Show: Sharon and Toby do more dares that are issued by their callers. The first dare is for Sharon to brush her teeth with Toby's big toe. The second dare is for Toby to beat himself up. The third dare is for both Sharon and Toby to cover themselves in glue and roll around in pillow feathers. The fourth dare is for Sharon and Toby's mother to eat five gallons of mayonnaise.; Hillbilly Moment: Lula Mae does a knock knock joke that involves hitting Eenis with a pink toilet.; Penelope Taynt: Penelope uses a Basset Hound to sniff out Amanda after doing a diversion that gets Barney out of the way. Yet the Basset Hound keeps failing to sniff out Amanda.; Totally Kyle: Kyle Rostensan talks about a dream he had about having soup for breakfast.; Closing: An audience member tells Amanda that he had to go to the bathroom making him unable to see the ending to the Blockblister sketch, so Amanda gets the actors involved to help reenact the ending. Penelope tries to sniff out Amanda on her own only to be caught by Barney.

=== Season 3 (2002) ===
The third season aired from January 19, 2002, to September 21, 2002. The cast and writers remain the same as previous season.

No. overall	No. in season	Title	Directed by	Original release date	Prod. code
31	1	"Episode 31"	Rich Correll, Virgil L. Fabian, Steve Hoefer & Ken Whittingham	January 19, 2002	301
Cold Opening: Penelope's date with Trevor is interrupted by Preston.; Introduction: Amanda smashes a piñata, only to find dental floss, instead of candy, inside it.; Snap, Krackle, Kaboom: A commercial about exploding cereal.; The Girls' Room: It's Prom Night at Kawaga Junior High as Amber tries to convince Principal Hazzmat to make her Prom Queen. Amber then hears from some girls that Jeremy Pembers has been elected as Prom King and sends Sheila to get him and congratulate him personally. Amber then hears from some girls that Danielle Spencer has been elected Prom Queen and has Sheila bring Danielle to her. Amber then usurps Danielle's position and then forces Jeremy to dance with her while Sheila gives Danielle a swirly.; The People Place: A store that sells actual people of different types.; Hilbilly Moment: Lula Mae's knock knock joke involves hitting Eenis in the head with a meat loaf.; Penelope Taynt: Penelope plans to hide in the car belonging to Amanda's parents hoping that Amanda will come to her car when the show will be over, but doesn't realize that Amanda's dad sold their old car to a nice family in exchange for a new car.; Totally Kyle: Kyle Rostensan tells about the time when he had a double cheeseburger.; Mr. Oldman: Mr. Oldman receives a prank call revolving around the Moofin Doofin Wrecking Company asking what time he wants his house torn down.; Closing: Amanda uses her best opera voice to attempt to break open a kid's bottle of soda.
32	2	"Episode 32"	Rich Correll, Virgil L. Fabian & Dan Schneider	February 2, 2002	302
Cold Opening: Penelope tries to catapult herself towards the Amanda Show stage. All that for nothing; as Preston pulls the lever, the catapult jams, causing Penelope to fall face-first to the ground.; Introduction: Amanda comes on stage telling her audience that she made them brownies, but they disappear while she's talking about them. Using an instant replay camera, she discovered that Drake and Josh ate them while she wasn't looking.; Super Spitballer 5000: The next airing of this commercial.; Judge Trudy: Judge Trudy rules over two cases. The first one deals with Gerald Phillips issuing a complaint against his female doctor who gave him a shot in the butt. Gerald claims the doctor did this because she's evil, which the doctor tries to deny by saying that it was a measles shot that kids get so they don't get sick, but loses Judge Trudy's favor when the doctor admits she would give Judge Trudy a shot if she got sick. Judge Trudy finds in favor of the plaintiff and has the bailiff give the doctor herself a shot using a large needle. The second one deals with Larry Traip issuing a complaint against the astronaut Commander Bright who snapped at Larry (who is often mistaken for a girl due to his long hair) after he stole a $3,000,000 space shuttle and lost it. Judge Trudy doesn't see any problem that Larry took the space shuttle and accepts Larry's words that he didn't mean to lose it, before finding in favor of the plaintiff and sending Commander Bright on a rocket to spend three years on the planet Venus.; Moody's Point: While Mr. Fallon adjusts to being without a toe, Spaulding tries to tell Moody how he feels about her on the night of the Winter Formal. Mr. Fallon's toe is in the possession of a homeless man until a dog steals it. Upon being asked out by the "second coolest guy" in school, Misty tries a new shampoo recipe that causes her hair to fall out.; Closing: Josh claims that Amanda went home sick and asked him to end the show for her. He sings "Swing Low, Sweet Chariot" upon Amanda entering upon breaking free from her ropes much to the surprise of Josh. When Amanda starts to tells Josh that if he ever ties her up in her dressing room again, Josh cuts her off stating that he won't do that again and leaves to go finish Amanda's laundry.
33	3	"Episode 33"	Rich Correll, Virgil L. Fabian, Dan Schneider & Ken Whittingham	February 9, 2002	303
Cold Opening: Penelope makes a deal with Josh which involves taking over Drake's roles as part of a plan to get close to Amanda.; Introduction: When Amanda receives a hate mail from a disgruntled kid named Michael who hates the show, she goes to confront Michael to evade having the audience head to his house as an angry mob. She learns that Michael actually hates "Clam World" which he mistook for "The Amanda Show."; LunchBay.com: The third airing of this commercial.; Tony Pajamas: Tony Pajamas springs into action when Miss DeBoat has Candy Tulips brought to Principal Walter Flange's office for getting in trouble when she was copying answers off a student's test paper and when she called her "Miss Big Butt." In order to get Candy out of trouble, Tony shows Principal Flange and Miss DeBoat photos of them picking their noses. The Al Dente brothers attack with jelly-filled doughnuts.; Kelly: Bath Lifeguard: A lifeguard ends up overseeing a kid's bath until a shark seeks revenge.; Hillbilly Moment: Lula Mae's knock knock joke involves hitting Eenis in the head with a plate full of strawberry shortcake.; Penelope Taynt: Penelope and Josh test out a trap door system on Barney which sends him all the way to China as part of a plan to get rid of Drake.; Totally Kyle: Kyle Rostensan tells about the time when he took a shower and got soap in his eyes.; Closing: Amanda tells jokes to an audience member's depressed cat. Josh has good memories with Drake and turns against Penelope by sending her down the trap door to China where Barney is having Chinese food with a Chinese family. Instead of getting rid of Drake, Josh unintentionally got rid of Penelope. Drake asks what happened and Josh doesn't know stating that he's sorry.
34	4	"Episode 34"	Rich Correll, Virgil L. Fabian, Dan Schneider & Ken Whittingham	March 23, 2002	304
Cold Opening: Drake and Josh watch the Dancing Lobsters' baby.; Introduction: Amanda is having trouble getting the show started when she's caught in the middle of a fight between a boyfriend (Ethan Glazer) and his jealous girlfriend (Haylie Duff), who thinks her boyfriend was staring at Amanda.; Pass The Skunk!: The second airing of this commercial.; Weenie Dooper: Doreen and her dad try selling unusual and revolting weenies in their restaurant like foot long hot dogs made from actual feet, toppings like Dog Food and Crustard (a type of mustard made from the eye crusts of Doreen's grandpa), Veggie Dog (made from vegetables and a dog), and a Hurricane Dog (which causes the consumer to be blown away by strong winds).; Amanda's Jacuzzi: Amanda interviews Benjamin Franklin.; Hillbilly Moment: Lula Mae's knock knock joke involves hitting Eenis in the head with a frog puppet.; Cooking with Me: Amanda hosts a cooking show while she is in a pot. While Amanda's in the pot, Penelope raids the set and ends up chased by Barney and Kathy.; Mr. Oldman: Mr. Oldman receives a prank call revolving around having to deliver pizza to the caller.; Closing: Seeing as the show moved through quickly Amanda challenges Drake to an arm wrestling contest. Drake beats her and Amanda lets Drake play the guitar and sing a song with his band "Drake 24/7."
35	5	"Episode 35"	Rich Correll, Virgil L. Fabian, Dan Schneider & Ken Whittingham	April 20, 2002	305
Cold Opening: Penelope tries to use a loudspeaker to contact Amanda. Amanda doesn’t hear her because she is listening to music on her headphones, so Penelope puts the speaker onto full power. However, the speaker explodes as soon as she calls from the microphone.; Introduction: Amanda is having a hard time hosting again when she encounters two people who believe they are on a game show.; Super Red Drops: A commercial about a candy ball that is super-hot.; The Dare Show: Sharon and Toby take more dares issued by their callers. The first dare is for Sharon to eat some of Toby's hair. The second dare is for Toby to put on a bra and stuff it with macaroni and cheese. The third dare is for Sharon to rub peanut butter on her head and press it into a bunch of mini marshmallows. The fourth dare is for Sharon and Toby's mother to lick the dirty camera lens.; The Gifted Class: A very "gifted class" takes on their substitute teacher Miss DeBoat such as predicting the future, rhyming, mind-controlling, and super-burping.; Hillbilly Moment: Lula Mae does a knock knock joke that involves hitting Eenis with a cement block.; Penelope Taynt: Penelope ends up babysitting Preston and his friends. While Penelope is getting hot sauce for the boys' pizza, they are visited by Amanda who asks for directions to a party on Green Meadow Drive. When one of the boys asks how she could be here when her show is on TV right now, Amanda tells him that the episode that they are seeing right now is a repeat. After she leaves, Penelope learns that Amanda was here and goes after her limousine.; Amanda's Jacuzzi: Amanda interviews the Queen of the United Kingdom.; Totally Kyle: Kyle Rostensan tells about the time when he was chewing gum and was later told by his friend Leif that he has gum on his shoe.; Closing: The two people who believe they are on a game show are still here.
36	6	"Episode 36"	Virgil L. Fabian, Steve Hoefer & Dan Schneider	May 18, 2002	306
Cold Opening: Penelope climbs up the studio building to saw a hole in the roof of Amanda's dressing room as Preston has another encounter with Amanda.; Introduction: A French painter takes over the show, as he needs Amanda to stay still as he is painting her portrait. Suddenly, Drake falls down from the ceiling.; My Beautiful Big Toe: The second airing of this commercial.; The Girls' Room: Sheila, Tammy, and Debbie celebrate Amber's birthday and each give her a present. Debbie gives Amber eggs while Tammy brings in a cake containing a dancing kid in a firefighter outfit. When it comes to Sheila's present, she discards it in order to steal Danielle Spencer's new dress.; Moody's Point: Moody tries to donate her toe only to learn from Dr. Polyp that the blood test states that Moody is not Mr. Fallon's real daughter. Her real name is Yolanda Wurzburg, the daughter of circus people called The Flying Wurzburgs. Mr. Fallon's toe ends up going from the dog to some kids who tie it to a balloon that ends up going to Mrs. Fallon. Meanwhile, Misty is mistaken for a patient that was to undergo the baboon heart transplant and soon ends up acting like a baboon and losing the gymnastic competition for acting like that.; Closing: A man stumbles out of his shower and somehow ends up on the stage where he runs into Amanda.
37	7	"Episode 37"	Virgil L. Fabian, Bobby Costanzo & Ken Whittingham	July 13, 2002	307
Cold Opening: Penelope meets Amanda's new karate instructor Nikko (played by James Lew) and challenges him to a fight.; Introduction: Amanda tries to disarm a robot, but instead she accidentally presses the "Kill Drake" button and the robot attacks Drake.; Mammal-Os: The second running of this commercial.; Judge Trudy: Judge Trudy rules over two cases. The first one deals with Jamie Biffle issuing a complaint against his mother who took away Jamie's allowance after he filled the entire house with water. Trying to visualize what Jamie did, Judge Trudy orders the bailiff to dump a bucket of water on Mrs. Biffle, but becomes annoyed at Mrs. Biffle being wet and warns that if she drips one more water drop on the floor, she will lose the case. When Mrs. Biffle fails to prevent a drop from falling into the floor, Judge Trudy finds in favor of the plaintiff and sentences Mrs. Biffle to wear a nest of deranged woodpeckers on her head. The second case deals with Margie Finkus issuing a complaint against two government agents who snapped at her for painting the White House pink during a class trip to the White House. Judge Trudy forces the government agents to admit that it never occurred to them that Margie had a reason to paint the White House pink, a reason which Margie claims she just didn't think she'd get caught doing so, and finds in favor of the plaintiff, sentencing the government agents to be chewed upon by two hungry leprechauns.; The Extremes: The Extremes react to thunderstorms, Cindy Extreme on her first prom date, an appearance of a spider, the arrival of the paperboy, the appearance of a kitten, and cleaning up a spill on Cindy's boyfriend Allen.; Hillbilly Moment: Lula Mae's knock knock joke involves hitting Eenis in the head with a DVD player.; Penelope Taynt: Penelope continues her fight with Nikko with the battle ending up damaging Nikko's truck.; Totally Kyle: Kyle Rostensan about the time when his mom wants him to get a haircut.; Closing: Amanda learns that Nikko hasn't shown up as he is still fighting Penelope.
38	8	"Episode 38"	Virgil L. Fabian, Dan Schneider, Steve Hoefer, Bobby Costanzo & Ken Whittingham	August 17, 2002	308
Cold Opening: Penelope hypnotizes Drake and Josh with truth gas so they can tell her where Amanda is, but it backfires with Drake stating that he sleeps in footsie pajamas, he has three hairs on his chest, he thinks unicorns are cool, his favorite color is lavender, and his feet smell like a dead animal and Josh wishing he was Amanda and smelled like her.; Introduction: Amanda keeps forgetting her lines and each of the cast members try to help her remember her lines.; Snap, Krackle, Kaboom: The second airing of this commercial.; Cynthia Worthington: Cynthia attends a fancy party of the Fweatherbee Family and does more rude things.; Amanda's Jacuzzi: Amanda interviews a professional wrestler.; The Lucklesses: The Lucklesses attend a baseball game where they have more terrible luck, which includes a baseball hitting their car and a foreign submarine accidentally launching a nuclear missile which not only lands in the US, but detonates right in the Lucklesses' arms.; Hillbilly Moment: Lula Mae's knock knock joke involves hitting Eenis in the head with a head.; Penelope Taynt: Penelope and Preston climb a telephone pole in order to hack into Amanda's telephone. They get France, South Dakota, and finally Amanda's dressing room. But when Penelope attempts to call Amanda, the wires explode.; Mr. Oldman: Mr. Oldman receives another prank call where he is ordered to constantly squirt whipped cream into his mouth.; Closing: Amanda is served Clams de Parfum which she didn't order and meets the chef and owner of a restaurant.
39	9	"Episode 39"	Virgil L. Fabian, Dan Schneider, Ken Whittingham & Bobby Costanzo	September 14, 2002	309
Cold Opening: Amanda reads the horoscope to Josh revolving around Drake getting attacked by sailors.; Introduction: Amanda loses the lower half of her body, so Kathy decides to go find it, because Amanda doesn't have legs.; Grown-Up Remote: A commercial about a remote control that can control grown-ups.; When Hula-Girls Attack: A documentary about Hula Girls attacking people. The victims include a pair of kid musicians performing at a parade and a weightlifter trying to win a weightlifting completion.; Amanda's Jacuzzi: Amanda interviews King Henry VIII.; The Imposters: A family gets visited by a boy and a girl who pass themselves off different jobs such as repairmen, firemen, and astronauts so that they can raid their refrigerator. A policeman and a policewoman arrive (trying to warn the neighborhood about the two people), but the family mistakes them for the boy and the girl and try to attack them, only leading to the police arresting them and taking them away. In the end, the boy and the girl return as umpires and continue to raid the family's refrigerator.; Hillbilly Moment: Lula Mae's knock knock joke involves hitting Eenis in the head with an endangered species (represented as a stuffed bald eagle).; Penelope Taynt: Penelope handcuffs Barney and tortures him by eating his shrimp cocktail in order to get the info on where Amanda is until Barney breaks the handcuffs and he and Penelope throw the last shrimp out the window and Drake and Josh end up fighting over it.; Mr. Oldman: Mr. Oldman has a hard time answering the phone causing the prank caller to give up.; Closing: Amanda is told by Dan Schneider that there is a speck on the lens of camera 2 as everyone tries to get it off until Barney taps on it, breaking the lens.
40	10	"Episode 40"	Virgil L. Fabian & Ken Whittingham	September 21, 2002	310
Cold Opening: Nancy introduces Amanda and Drake to the "Costumatic 5000", a machine that gets you dressed quickly, but she has some trouble operating the machine.; Introduction: Amanda's show opening is interrupted by a fly swarming around the stage.; Sumo: A commercial about soda that comes from a sumo wrestler.; Judge Trudy: Judge Trudy rules over two cases. The first one deals with Craig Fellharbor issuing a complaint against his dad who took away his computer after he shut down the entire Internet, which resulted in email breaking down, prisoners escaping from prison, wars breaking out, and the moon falling from the sky. Judge Trudy finds those incidents to not be an appropriate reason for Mr. Fellharbor taking Craig's computer away, and finds in favor of the plaintiff, having the bailiff handcuff Mr. Fellharbor to a sweaty opera singer. The second one deals with Vicki Pundle issuing a complaint against her babysitter Ms. Wither who made her take a bath after playing in the mud. When Ms. Wither insists that when children get dirty, they're supposed to get cleaned, Judge Trudy replies that when "blabbermouths" like Ms. Wither interrupt her, they lose cases, finding in favor of the plaintiff and having the bailiff place Ms. Wither into a bathtub filled with Cream of Mushroom soup.; The Extremes: The Extremes get a visit from Cindy Extreme's teacher.; Hillbilly Moment: Lula Mae's knock knock joke involves hitting Eenis in the head with a computer monitor.; Penelope Taynt: Penelope visits a psychologist who tries to deal with her Amanda obsession.; Mr. Oldman: Mr. Oldman receives another prank call revolving around answering a question where the right answer gains him $1,000,000. This distracts him from a meatloaf he's cooking causing it to blow up and hit him in the face.; Hillbilly Moment: Lula Mae's knock knock joke involves hitting Eenis in the head with a cactus branch.; Totally Kyle: Kyle Rostensan tells about his time when he was at the store with his grandfather.; Closing: Drake gets chased by three huge football players searching for their football.

=== The Best of The Amanda Show (2002) ===
After the series ended its initial run, six "The Best of..." episodes were produced.

Title	Directed by	Original release date
"The Best of Penelope, Please"	Dan Schneider	March 23, 2002
The best sketches featuring Penelope Taynt.
"The Best of Freaky Families"	Dan Schneider	April 6, 2002
The Extremes, The Klutzes, The Literals, and The Lucklesses
"The Best of Commercials"	Dan Schneider	April 27, 2002
Meatloaf Crunch, Popper Pants, Super Spitballer 5000, and Remote Control Underpants.
"The Best of Judge Trudy"	Dan Schneider	May 4, 2002
The best sketches featuring Judge Trudy.
"The Best of Drake and Josh"	Dan Schneider	May 11, 2002
The Dare Show, Melody & Thad, When... Attack, Totally Kyle, and Tony Pajamas
"The Best of Amanda's Favorites"	Dan Schneider	May 18, 2002
The Girls' Room (Amber's Birthday), Crazy Courtney, Mr. Oldman, Blockblister, and Cynthia Worthington
