= Sweethearts (British game show) =

1987 game show

- Genre: Panel show
- Created by: David Moore; Terry Mardell; John Lyons
- Presented by: Larry Grayson
- Voices of: John Benson
- Theme music composer: Ed Welch
- Country of origin: United Kingdom
- Original language: English
- No. of series: 1
- No. of episodes: 13

Production
- Running time: 30 minutes (inc. adverts)
- Production company: Anglia in association with Createl Ltd.

Original release
- Network: ITV
- Release: 31 March – 23 June 1987

Sweethearts is a panel show that aired on ITV from 31 March to 23 June 1987 and is hosted by Larry Grayson.

== Gameplay ==
A panel of three celebrities faced three couples. Each couple had a story about how they met, two of them were false, the other was real. Each couple came out and were questioned by the panel, who would attempt to guess who was faking.

== International versions ==
Country	Name	Host	Network	Premiere	Finale
United States	Sweethearts	Charles Nelson Reilly	Syndication	12 September 1988	8 September 1989
United States	Sweethearts	Richard Kline	Syndication	12 September 1988	8 September 1989
