= The Ticket =

The Ticket may refer to:

- The Ticket, a supplement to The Irish Times
- "The Ticket" (Seinfeld), a 1992 episode of Seinfeld
- "The Ticket" (The West Wing), a 2005 episode of The West Wing
- SportsRadio 1310/96.7 The Ticket, an AM/FM sports-talk radio station in Dallas, Texas, broadcast on KTCK-AM/KTCK-FM
- KTLT, an FM radio station in Anson, Texas, branded as The Ticket
- WAXY (AM), an AM sports-talk radio station in Miami-Ft. Lauderdale, FL, also known as 790 The Ticket
- WXYT-FM, an Entercom-owned FM sports-talk station in Detroit, Michigan, also known as 97.1 The Ticket.
- The Ticket, a Channel V television series which reviews movies
- The Ticket (1997 film)
- The Ticket (2016 film)
