= Phillip Van Dyke =

American actor

- Born: June 13, 1984 (age 42); San Francisco, California, U.S.
- Occupation: Actor
- Years active: 1993–2003
- Spouse: Jennifer Hibbert (m. 2009)
- Children: 3

Phillip Van Dyke (born June 13, 1984) is an American former actor, best known for his role as the goblin Luke in the first two installments of Disney's Halloweentown film series and Arnold Shortman in seasons two and three of Nickelodeon's Hey Arnold!.

== Career ==
He had a role in the short-lived series The Home Court. He appeared once in a guest role in Dr. Quinn, Medicine Woman. He also had the title role in the short-lived Nickelodeon series Noah Knows Best. He also appeared as the sixteen-year-old Christopher Hayden on the show Gilmore Girls in the season three episode titled Dear Emily and Richard.

Phillip did also make an appearance on The Amanda Show. He became the voice of the lead character Arnold Shortman in the second season of Hey Arnold!, replacing Toran Caudell after the latter's voice changed. While he would be replaced by Spencer Klein after the third season for the same reason, he later made one-shot appearances as Sandy in the special Summer Love and more famously, Ludwig in the episode New Bully on the Block.

In a 2020 interview with E!, Van Dyke expressed interest in returning for another Halloweentown film if the rest of the cast also returned.

== Personal life ==
On December 28, 2009, Van Dyke married Jennifer Hibbert. They have two children, a son, Flynn, born in 2012, and a daughter, Remy, born in October 2016. In addition, he also has a daughter, Paris, born on May 30, 2002, from a previous relationship.

== Filmography ==
=== Film ===
Year	Title	Role	Notes
1994	The Fantastic Four	Young Johnny	
1997	Crayola Kids Adventures: 20,000 Leagues Under the Sea	Ned Land	
1997	Crayola Kids Adventures: The Trojan Horse	Achilles	
1998	The Secret of NIMH 2: Timmy to the Rescue	Young Martin	
1998	The Modern Adventures of Tom Sawyer	Tom Sawyer	
1999	Bartok the Magnificent	Ivan	

=== Television ===
Year	Title	Role	Notes
1993	Family Album	Max Lerner	6 episodes
1994	The Adventures of Brisco County, Jr.	Son	Episode: "Ned Zed"
1994	Picket Fences	Bobby Hutton	Episode: "Frosted Flakes"
1994	Someone She Knows	Cash Gardner	Television film
1994, 1995	Step by Step	Ryan	2 episodes
1995	Baywatch	Brent	Episode: "Father's Day"
1995	The Return of Hunter: Everyone Walks in L.A.	Tommy Sherry	Television film
1995	Burke's Law	The Boy	Episode: "Who Killed the World's Greatest Chef?"
1995–1996	The Home Court	Ellis Solomon	20 episodes
1996	Dave's World	Jeff	Episode: "Solitaire"
1996	Sliders	Young Quinn Mallory	Episode: "The Guardian"
1996	Dr. Quinn, Medicine Woman	Phillip Marshall	Episode: "Separate Buy Equal"
1997	The Ticket	Eric Riecker	Television film
1997	Foto Novelas: Mangas	Damian	Television film
1997–2000	Hey Arnold!	Arnold Shortman / Ludwig / Sandy	36 episodes
1998	The Wonderful World of Disney	Kent Marlowe	Episode: "Safety Patrol"
1998	Ghosts of Fear Street	Young PJ	Television film
1998	The New Batman Adventures	Joel	Episode: "Legends of the Dark Knight"
1998	Halloweentown	Luke	Television film
1999	The First Gentleman	President's Boy	Television film
2000	Noah Knows Best	Noah Beznick	13 episodes
2001	Halloweentown II: Kalabar's Revenge	Luke	Television film
2001	The Amanda Show	—N/a	Episode #2.13
2003	Gilmore Girls	Young Christopher	Episode: "Dear Emily and Richard"
2003	Without a Trace	Dylan Lincoln	Episode: "Clare de Lune"
2003	Boston Public	Brian Harrower	3 episodes
2003	NYPD Blue	Adam Wilentz	Episode: "Frickin' Fraker"
