= The Phil Donahue Show =

American television talk show

- Also known as: Donahue (1974–1996)
- Genre: Talk show
- Created by: Phil Donahue
- Presented by: Phil Donahue
- Theme music composer: Don Grady
- Country of origin: United States
- Original language: English
- No. of seasons: 29
- No. of episodes: 6,715

Production
- Production locations: Dayton, Ohio (1967–1974; seasons 1–7); Chicago, Illinois (1974–1985; seasons 8–18); New York City (1985–1996; seasons 19–29)
- Production companies: Avco Broadcasting (1967–1970; seasons 1–3); Avco Program Sales (seasons 4–6, 1970–1976); Multimedia Entertainment (seasons 7–29, 1976–1996)

Original release
- Network: WLWD (1967–1970; seasons 1–3); First-run syndication (1970–1996; seasons 4–29)
- Release: November 6, 1967 – September 13, 1996

The Phil Donahue Show (Note: The show's title is commonly shortened to Donahue.) is an American daytime talk show that was hosted by Phil Donahue. The show ran for 29 seasons from November 6, 1967, to September 13, 1996, in which it broadcast 6,715 episodes. Before it was placed in syndication in 1970, it was broadcast as a local program on WLWD. Each episode featured Donahue interviewing a panel of guests over different topics. Donahue heavily encouraged participation among audience members.

== History ==
=== Donahue as a local program (1967–1970) ===
In 1967, Phil Donahue quit working as a news reporter and interviewer at WHIO-FM and WHIO-TV in Dayton, Ohio, just 3 hours from his hometown of Cleveland, Ohio, to go into the station's sales department. However, he found he didn't like sales and took an on-air news position at another Dayton TV station, WLWD, which later became WDTN. When WLWD named Phil Donahue to replace Johnny Gilbert as the host of a daytime talk show, they kept the live format and studio audience. However, Donahue decided to take the show in a new direction to do a new daytime talk show called The Phil Donahue Show. Donahue interviewed guests on a variety of topics, including politics, religion, and social issues.

For each show, Donahue would focus on a single guest and topic that ran for 60 minutes. After introducing the guest and explaining the topic, Phil Donahue would invite the studio audience to ask questions of the guest. He would then moderate the discussion between the guest and audience. The Phil Donahue Show debuted as a local program in Dayton, Ohio, on November 6, 1967, and ran until September 11, 1970. It was first distributed by Avco Broadcasting. Donahue interviewed his first guest, Madalyn Murray O'Hair, a prominent atheist. Though he would later call her message of atheism "very important", he also stated she was rather unpleasant and that, off-camera, she mocked him for being Roman Catholic.

=== Donahue goes national (1970–1985) ===
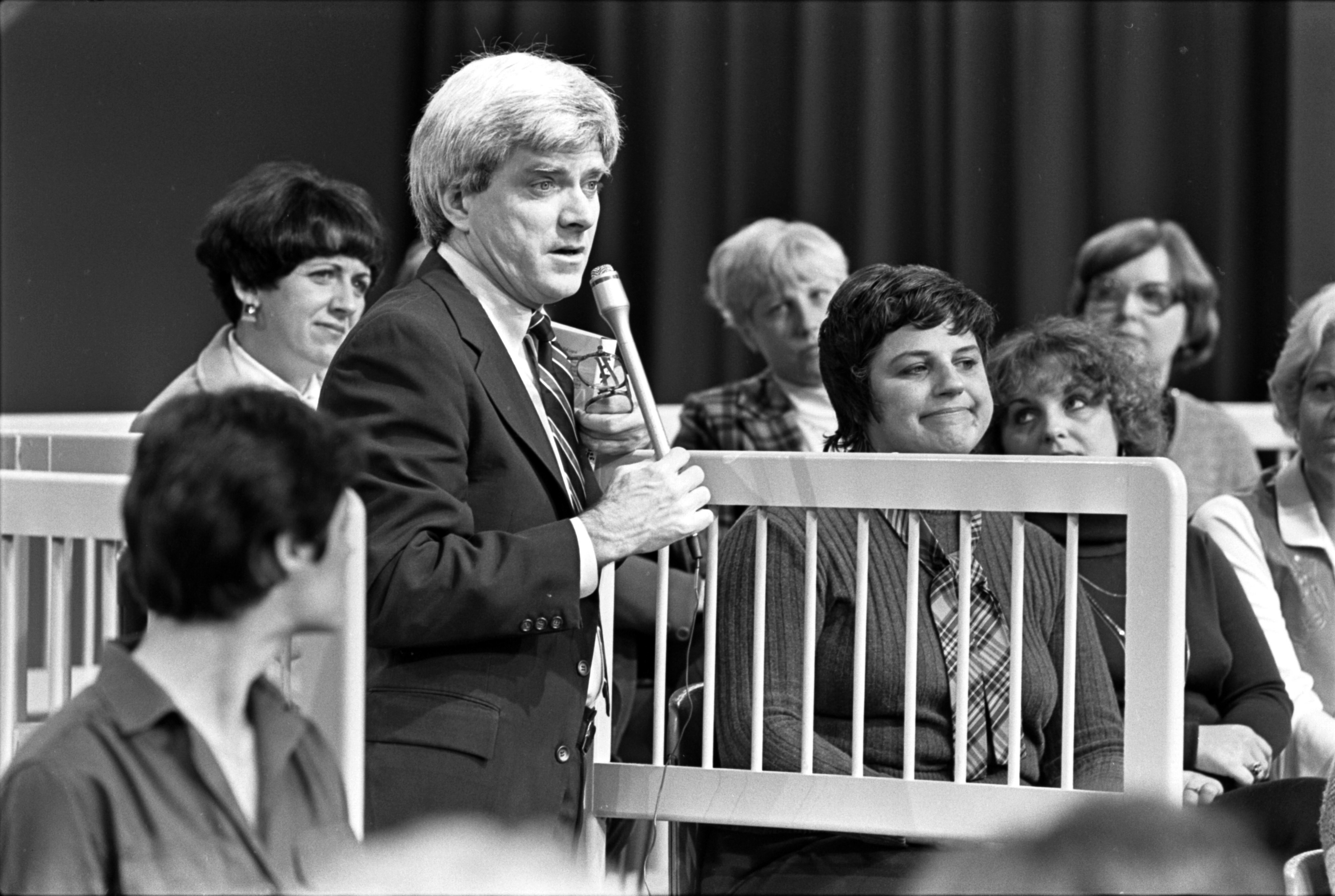
Donahue during a 1980 episode

On September 14, 1970, The Phil Donahue Show expanded from a local program to national syndication. Avco Program Sales took over production of the show. The Phil Donahue Show began taping episodes on the road on January 13, 1971. It visited locations including Russia, Miami, Florida; Los Angeles, California; Atlanta, Georgia; Detroit, Michigan; Valley Forge, Pennsylvania; Fort Lauderdale, Florida; Cedar Rapids, Iowa; and the Ohio State Penitentiary in 1972. On April 29, 1974, the show moved to Chicago, where it was produced at the studios of independent station WGN-TV, and The Phil Donahue Show was renamed Donahue. On January 26, 1975, Phil Donahue celebrated his 1,000th episode of the show. By this time, Donahue had become a household name. Marlo Thomas first appeared on Donahue on January 22, 1977, to promote the film Thieves, in which she had a role. Her second appearance was on January 13, 1979, to commemorate the show's 2,000th episode. On that occasion, she presented Phil Donahue with a plaque honoring his achievement. On January 11, 1982, Phil Donahue hosted his 3,000th episode of The Phil Donahue Show. To commemorate the milestone, Marlo Thomas presented Donahue with a plaque. This was Marlo's third appearance on Donahue. She had previously appeared in 1977 and 1979.

Novelist-philosopher Ayn Rand appeared on the show twice, airing on May 16, 1979 and April 29, 1980.

On April 9, 1984, Donahue introduced viewers to hip-hop culture. This was the first time that breakdancing was featured on national television. The episode included a performance by the hip hop group UTFO. In January, 1985, Donahue and his program moved to New York City. They began taping at Studio 8-G at NBC Studios, located at 30 Rockefeller Plaza, which is the home of WNBC-TV, his New York affiliate. In anticipation of the move, a month-long series of commercials announced the move. Late-night talk show host David Letterman even devoted a portion of his national program to counting down the days to Donahue's move, using a huge calendar in his studio. On November 13, 1985, Phil Donahue hosted his 4,000th episode. To commemorate the occasion, Marlo Thomas, who had appeared on the show three previous times, presented Donahue with a plaque.

==== Fainting hoax ====
On January 21, 1985, soon after the show moved from Chicago to New York, seven members of the audience appeared to faint during the broadcast, which was seen live in New York. This incident is one of the most discussed in the show's history. Donahue feared that the fainting incident was caused by both anxiety at being on television and an overheated studio, so he cleared the studio of audience members and resumed the show. However, the fainting "spell" was actually a media hoax perpetrated by Alan Abel, who claimed it was a protest against poor-quality television.

=== Later years (1985–1996) ===
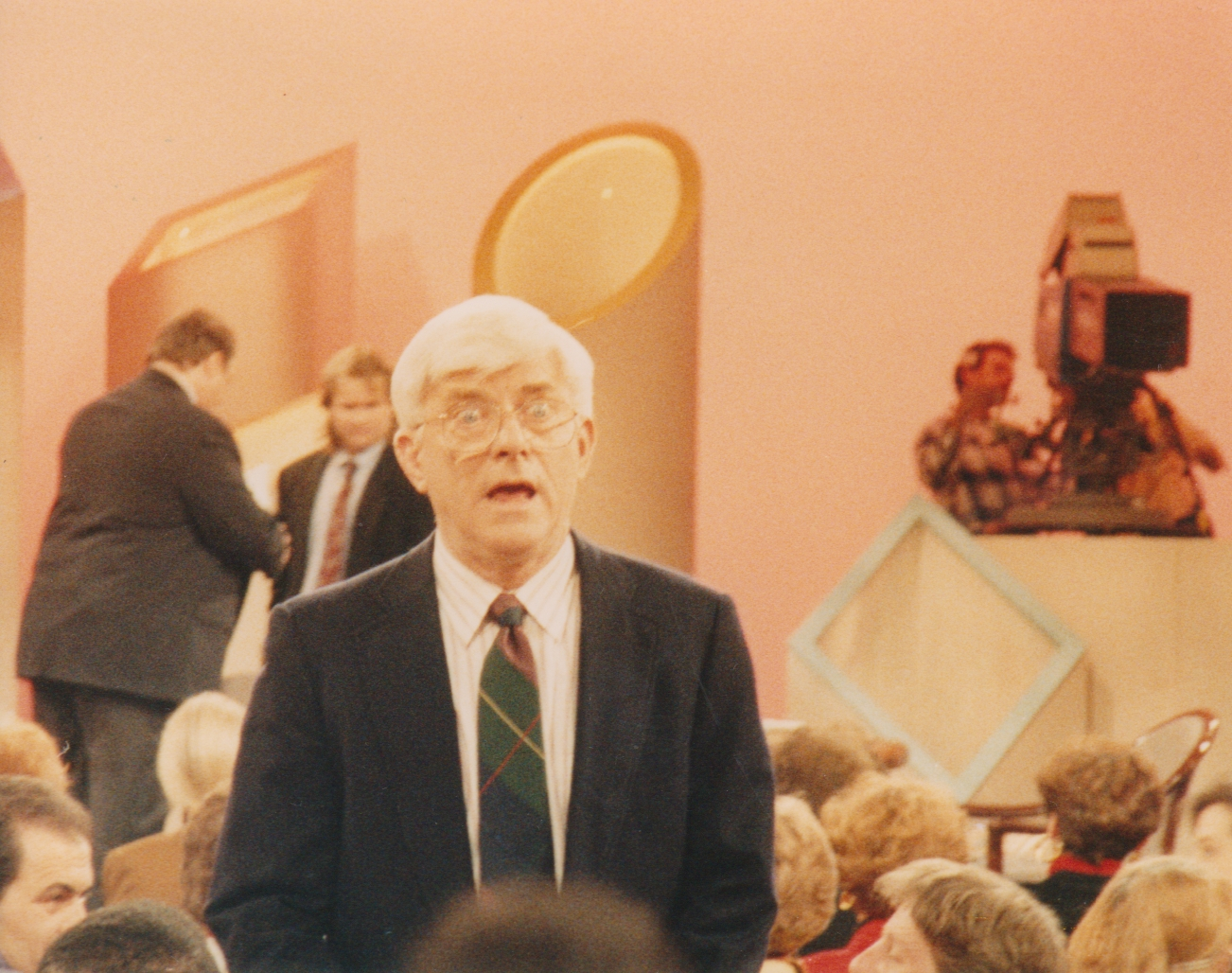
Phil Donahue show in 1990s

On September 16, 1987, the show celebrated its 20th anniversary and 5,000th episode. Marlo Thomas appeared on the show for the fifth time, making this a special appearance. In 1987, The Phil Donahue Show celebrated its 5,000th episode. To commemorate the occasion, Marlo Thomas presented Phil Donahue with a plaque. Marlo Thomas was a frequent guest on the show. She appeared on the show in 1977, 1979, 1982, and 1985. The 1979 appearance was the 2,000th episode of the show, the 1982 appearance was the 3,000th episode, and the 1985 appearance was the 4,000th episode. On November 25, 1988, Marlo Thomas appeared on Donahue to promote her special, Free to Be... a Family. This was Marlo's sixth appearance on Donahue. Phil chats with Marlo and her children, showing clips from the special. Donahue also chats with the audience.

Donahue celebrated its silver 25th anniversary on November 15, 1992. The show was hosted by Phil Donahue and featured a special appearance by Marlo Thomas. Donahue was also lauded by his peers, but was seen as having been surpassed by Oprah Winfrey and Sally Jessy Raphael. On December 6, 1992, Donahue hosted his 6,000th episode of the show, marking a major milestone in daytime television history. On December 14, 1992, the producers of Donahue, Ed Glavin and Debbie Harwick Glavin, left the show to work on The Jenny Jones Show. This departure was a blow to the show which was celebrating its 6,000th episode that day.

The talk show field became increasingly saturated as the 1990s progressed. Many of these shows took an increasingly tabloid bent. Donahue shied away from this trend, continuing to take a "high-road" approach. However, Donahue featured some similar sensational topics during sweeps periods. These factors led to a marked decline in ratings. The show's ratings also started slipping after Donahue expressed his feelings about the first Gulf War.

In January 1995, KGO-TV in San Francisco, California, stopped airing Donahue after carrying it for several years. KGO-TV is owned by ABC. In August 1995, flagship NBC O&O station WNBC-TV in New York City ceased airing the show permanently after airing every weekday afternoon since 1977. In mid-1995, Donahue was also evicted from its 30 Rockefeller Plaza home and relocated to new studios at Pennsylvania Plaza in Manhattan. Attempts to relocate the show on other stations in the nation's largest and eighth-largest markets failed, and the show's ratings never recovered. Many other stations either began dropping Donahue entirely or moving it to overnight or graveyard time slots. The ratings for Donahue continued to decline. Rather than have the show canceled, Phil Donahue decided to retire.

Donahue aired its series finale in syndication on September 13, 1996. The show had been on the air for 29 seasons, producing 6,715 episodes, with over 6,000 episodes. On January 5, 1996, Phil Donahue announced that he would be retiring from broadcasting to spend more time with his wife Marlo Thomas, his five children from his first marriage, as well as his grandchildren. Phil and Marlo were married in 1980. On August 12, 1996, Donahue and Thomas took every single person who had ever worked on the Donahue show on a cruise to Bermuda on the Carnival Destiny. The cruise was part of the Donahue: That's All Folks show.

In the final episode, Donahue interviewed the show's executive producer, Patricia McMillen. McMillen had been with the show since its premiere as a local program on November 6, 1967. Donahue and McMillen reminisced about their time together on the show by showing clips from previous episodes, and discussed the show's impact on society. Marlo Thomas made seven appearances on the show, including her first appearance in 1977, the 2,000th episode in 1979, the 3,000th episode in 1982, the 4,000th episode in 1985, the 5,000th episode in 1987, and the 1988 episode to promote Free to Be... a Family. She also appeared on the show in 1992 to celebrate the 25th anniversary of Donahue. During the final episode of Donahue, Donahue chatted with audience members to answer their questions.

The show ended its 29-season run with a series finale that featured a celebration with Donahue and the entire staff. The celebration included a party with confetti cannons and champagne being poured over Donahue's head. Joining in the celebration was his wife, Marlo Thomas. Ricochet's 1995 debut single "What Do I Know" can be heard in the background during the celebration.

== Broadcast history and release ==
Episodes were available for individual purchase from Video Archives.

== Reception ==
=== Critical response ===
Ken Tucker of Entertainment Weekly praised Donahue's hosting abilities, stating, "[Donahue's] a host with real opinions and the brains to back them up."

In 2002, Donahue was ranked 29th on TV Guide magazine's list of the 50 greatest television shows of all-time.

=== Cultural impact ===
According to Oprah Winfrey, "If there had been no Phil Donahue show, there would be no Oprah Winfrey Show".

=== Awards and nominations ===
Awards and nominations
Award	Year (Note: Indicates the year of ceremony)	Category	Nominee(s)	Result	Ref.
Daytime Emmy Awards	1995	Outstanding Talk Show	The Phil Donahue Show	Nominated	
