= Noah Knows Best =

American sitcom

- Genre: Sitcom
- Created by: Ken Lipman
- Starring: Phillip Van Dyke; Rachel Roth; Richard Kline; Willie Green; Marcia Strassman; Stacy Meadows; Cori Yarckin; Dempsey Pappion; Robert Scism
- Country of origin: United States
- Original language: English
- No. of seasons: 1
- No. of episodes: 13 (5 unaired in the US)

Production
- Executive producer: Ken Lipman
- Producer: Kelly Oien
- Production locations: Nickelodeon Studios, Universal Studios Florida Orlando, Florida
- Running time: 30 minutes
- Production companies: Tested Ladder Entertainment; Nickelodeon Productions

Original release
- Network: Nickelodeon
- Release: October 7 – December 17, 2000

Noah Knows Best is an American sitcom that aired on Nickelodeon from October 7 to December 17, 2000. The series was canceled with five unaired episodes out of thirteen produced, due to low ratings. The five unaired episodes were shown overseas in various countries like the UK and Australia following the shows cancellation in the US. The show starred Phillip Van Dyke as the title character, Noah. The show was recorded at Nickelodeon Studios in Orlando, Florida and was the last sitcom of its kind to be taped there as the concept was thought to be too outdated by its time of premiering. It was one of the last shows to premiere on Nickelodeon's Saturday Night block, SNICK.

== History ==
The show only lasted for two months on Nickelodeon, from October to December 2000. The poor ratings resulted in the quick cancellation of the show. Creator Ken Lipman, co-creator of The Secret World of Alex Mack, stated once in an interview that creative differences were the reason the show did not last long. As he says regarding the inspiration for the show:

After 78 episodes of Alex, I was a little bored with the heightened reality/sci-fi/gimmicky aspect of the show and had felt the reason that it worked and resonated with kids was more about the characters than the powers. I also am a city guy, grew up in NYC, and really wanted to do a contemporary, urban, single-camera comedy that took place in NY. Noah was something I really wanted to try and even though it was a different idea for Nick, and they didn't warm to it immediately, I appreciated when they green lit for pilot.

— Ken Lipman, "Inside peek from “Alex Mack” and “Noah Knows Best” from show creator Ken Lipman", Nickelodeon Studios: Past, Present, and Future (August 19, 2014)

== Cast ==
- Phillip Van Dyke as Noah Beznick
- Rachel Roth as Megan Beznick
- Marcia Strassman as Martine Beznick
- Willie Green as Alton Martin
- Stacy Meadows as D.J. Martin
- Richard Kline as Jeff Beznick
- Robert Scism as Oliver Johnson

== Episodes ==
| No. | Title | Directed by | Written by | Original release date |
|---|---|---|---|---|
| 1 | "The Tickets" | Allison Liddi | Ken Lipman | October 7, 2000 |
| 2 | "The Computer" | Pamela Dresser | Ken Lipman | October 14, 2000 |
| 3 | "Noah Knows Politics" | Dana DeVally Piazza | Amy Sriberg & Mindy Schneider | October 21, 2000 |
| 4 | "Door to Door" | Pamela Dresser | Emily Kapnek | November 4, 2000 |
| 5 | "Three's Company" | Virgil Fabian | Amy Sriberg & Mindy Schneider | November 18, 2000 |
| 6 | "Pink Slip-Up" | Allison Liddi-Brown | Emily Kapnek | December 3, 2000 |
| 7 | "Slices of Life" | Allison Liddi | Amy Sriberg & Mindy Schneider | December 10, 2000 |
| 8 | "Lost Night" | Kim Fields | Ken Lipman | December 17, 2000 |
| 9 | "The Final Insult" | Pamela Dresser | Temi Akinyemi | December 26, 2000 (UK) |
| 10 | "Slam Book" | Allison Liddi | Temi Akinyemi | December 26, 2000 (UK) |
| 11 | "Noah's Art" | Dana DeVally Piazza | Amy Sriberg & Mindy Schneider | December 26, 2000 (UK) |
| 12 | "Clipped in the Wings" | Virgil Fabian | Emily Kapnek | December 26, 2000 (UK) |
| 13 | "The Tutor" | Virgil Fabian | Temi Akinyemi | Unaired |
