= Sweethearts (American game show) =

- Genre: Game show
- Presented by: Charles Nelson Reilly; Richard Kline (substitute)
- Announcer: Jim McKrell
- Country of origin: United States

Production
- Running time: 30 Minutes
- Production companies: Richard Reid Productions, Inc. Createl Ltd. Multimedia Entertainment

Original release
- Network: Syndication
- Release: September 12, 1988 – September 8, 1989

Sweethearts is an American television game show which aired from September 12, 1988 to September 8, 1989. It was based on the 1987 British series of the same name. The show was syndicated throughout the United States in production by Richard Reid Productions, Inc. in association with Createl Ltd. and Multimedia Entertainment, a division of Multimedia, Inc.

Charles Nelson Reilly was the host. Richard Kline guest-hosted.

== Gameplay ==
A sort of combination of The Dating/Newlywed Game and To Tell the Truth. Three couples each with a different story on how they met faced a panel of three celebrities, two of them were false, the other was telling the truth. Each couple came out one at a time, then each panelist asked the couple in control questions for an unlimited amount of time.

When all the couples were grilled then the panel voted on which couple's story was true. Each incorrect vote was worth $500 to the couples, later reduced to $250 per incorrect vote, and fooling the panel completely won the real couple a big trip.

Among the celebrities who appeared were, Sally Struthers, Tony Orlando, Zsa Zsa Gabor, McLean Stevenson, Phyllis Diller, Tom Poston, and Richard Simmons.

=== Home Viewer Sweepstakes ===
Home viewers had the chance to get in on the fun by playing the home viewer game. Just like the panelists on the show, home viewers must watch and listen to all three stories (one from each of the three couples) and after they have seen and heard from all three, the home viewer must then vote on which one of the three is true simply by calling their respective 900 number. The winning home viewer selected at random would win a nice prize.
