= Sally (talk show) =

American television talk show (1983–2002)

- Also known as: In Touch with Sally Jessy Raphael; The Sally Jessy Raphael Show
- Genre: Talk show
- Directed by: Kit Carson
- Presented by: Sally Jessy Raphael
- Country of origin: United States
- Original language: English
- No. of seasons: 19
- No. of episodes: 3,820

Production
- Executive producer: Burt Dubrow
- Camera setup: Multi-camera
- Running time: 30 minutes (1983–1986); 60 minutes (1986–2002)
- Production companies: Universal Television (1983) (season 1 episode 1); Multimedia Entertainment (1984–1997) (season 1 episode 2–season 13); Wolf Films (1996–1997) (season 14 episodes 1–22); Universal Television Enterprises (1997–2002) (season 14 episode 23–season 19); Studios USA Television Distribution (1998–2002) (seasons 15–19)

Original release
- Network: KSDK (1983) and Syndication (1983–2002)
- Release: October 17, 1983 – May 22, 2002

Sally (Note: The show was originally titled In Touch with Sally Jessy Raphael and renamed The Sally Jessy Raphael Show before its title was shortened to simply Sally.) is an American daytime talk show that was hosted by Sally Jessy Raphael. The show ran for nineteen seasons from October 17, 1983, to May 22, 2002, in which it broadcast 3,820 episodes. It was broadcast on KSDK for its first season; however, it was placed in syndication for the rest of its run.

== Format ==
Sally Jessy Raphael was one of the first audience-participation, issue-driven talk shows to have a female host, predating The Oprah Winfrey Show by three years. The program was a part of the tabloid talk show genre that pervaded daytime television throughout much of the 1980s and 1990s.

The show incorporated questions from audience members.

== Production ==
=== Conception and development ===
In the early years of the nationally syndicated run, Sally Jessy Raphael remained a half-hour show, but in 1986, Raphael expanded production of each episode to an hour's length. However, broadcast markets were allowed to retain a half-hour packaging of her show, which most opted for, especially since stations already had successful half-hour entries, no matter local or national, scheduled before or after Sally. The 30-minute edits resorted to running the closing credit crawls before segments wrapped up, often as guests still had the floor.

From the summer of 1987 through August 1989, the show originated from the studios of New Haven, Connecticut's WTNH (channel 8), where one large studio of the ABC affiliate's facility was divided to house both the talk show and WTNH's news set. In August 1989, Sally moved into the Unitel facilities in Manhattan, also home to MTV and, later, Rush Limbaugh, whom Raphael did not like. At one point in the feud between Limbaugh and Raphael, staffers for Sally leaked a photo of Raphael without her makeup or glasses to Limbaugh, and a staffer (without Limbaugh's permission) put the photo on air during Limbaugh's show. In 1998, the show moved to new production facilities in the former grand ballroom of the Hotel Pennsylvania (which had been modified as such by NEP Broadcasting), also in New York City, where it remained until its cancellation in 2002, sharing the space with sister talk show Maury with differing sets and studio layouts.

=== Topic selection ===
The show featured topics such as "I Survived Despite My Parents", "My Husband Wears Dresses", "Women Who Have to Kill Their Husbands", "Children of Infidelity", and "Black Women Who Lost Their Husbands to White Women". Raphael had little involvement in topic selection, with executive producer Burt Dubrow stating, "Let's put it this way ... We produce the show. [Raphael] hosts the show." Raphael said that she "look[s] for human interest stories that everyone is interested in."

When the show started it covered topics such as people with extreme religious beliefs, but in the later shows Sally and her after specialist Pat Ferrari moved on to more personal family matters such as pregnant and/or out-of-control teens. Topics of the show varied widely, from the controversial and hard-hitting stories to more lighthearted fare such as hypnotists getting guests to do funny gags.

As a result, when content ratings were introduced in the 1990s, the ratings for Sally varied widely from episode to episode, from TV-G to TV-14. Drag queens were frequently featured on the show, usually in fun, and some even dressed as Sally impersonators.

In 1997, the show broadcast an episode titled "We Don't Want Your Race in Our Neighborhood", in which a white guest discussed racism she allegedly experienced in a predominately black neighborhood. The episode received some backlash and neighborhood residents claimed that their issues with the guest were actually due to her failure to discipline her child.

Raphael differentiated the show from other single-issue shows, stating, "Donahue is more of an investigative journalist. Oprah is very instinctive. I think of myself as being the moderate, even the conservative. I come across as what I am, a woman who's been married for 24 years, has children, is involved with her family."

The Chicago Tribune's Steve Johnson described the typical episode topic as "[e]xtreme makeovers."

=== Guest and audience recruitment ===
The show recruited guests through posted notices during episodes—known as carts—which provided viewers with future episode topics and the show's phone number. To attend as an audience member, a person could write to the show to request tickets.

By its conclusion, the show had booked approximately 10,000 guests.

==== Notable guests ====
Nick Sutton of Gummo fame was scouted by director Harmony Korine while watching the episode "My Child Died from Sniffing Paint".

In 1993, a 16-year-old Gerard Way, future My Chemical Romance frontman, appeared on the show during an episode debating whether or not comics were appropriate for children. At the time, Way was a writer for Hart D. Fisher comic "Boneyard Press".

== Broadcast history and release ==
While only a select few markets picked up the full-hour Sally shows in the 1986–87 season, an increasing number of stations made the option over the next few years, especially as networks started to free up their daytime slots. For example, in January 1989, WCVB-TV in Boston, which had been airing the 30-minute Sally broadcasts at 11 a.m. (having previously aired them in late-night slots from 1984 to 1987), opted to go with the hour-long version when the ABC soap opera Ryan's Hope, which WCVB aired (out of network pattern) at 11:30, was canceled. By 1990, all stations that carried Sally were airing her shows for 60 minutes.

The show reached the milestone of its 1,000th episode on July 25, 1994.

In October 2001, Raphael signed a multi-year deal with Studios USA Domestic TV to continue hosting the show. However, the show was ultimately canceled on March 11, 2002. Its final episode was broadcast on May 22, 2002. It was canceled due to low ratings, as well as the fading popularity of the tabloid talk show subgenre as a whole.

Episodes were available for individual purchase from Video Archives. Episode transcripts were available for individual purchase from Journal Graphics.

In 2017, Nosey, a free online streaming service offering video of daytime television shows, began making episodes of Sally available for viewing.

== Reception ==
=== Television viewership and ratings ===
The show that garnered her largest ratings was dedicated to women with large breasts.

=== Critical response ===
Ken Tucker of Entertainment Weekly believed that Raphael had a "faintly superior air" and that her line of questioning created a condescending atmosphere.

New York listed it as one of the worst television shows of 1995 and the Los Angeles Times's Howard Rosenberg listed it as the second worst series of 1999. According to Newsday's Marvin Kitman, the show "pioneered in exploiting teenage girls."

=== Cultural impact ===
The show inspired other television presenters, such as Sherri Shepherd of Sherri.

The PBS children's show, Sesame Street parodied this talk show and its host as Sally Messy Yuckyael, a Grouch.

Sally and its host Raphael appeared in Paramount's 1991 film The Addams Family as a cameo.

=== Awards and nominations ===
Awards and nominations
Award	Year	Category	Nominee(s)	Result	Ref.
Daytime Emmy Awards	1988	Outstanding Daytime Talk Series Host	Sally Jessy Raphael	Nominated	
Daytime Emmy Awards	1989	Outstanding Daytime Talk Series Host	Sally Jessy Raphael	Won	
Daytime Emmy Awards	1990	Outstanding Daytime Talk Series Host	Sally Jessy Raphael	Nominated	
Daytime Emmy Awards	1990	Outstanding Daytime Talk Series	Sally	Won	
Daytime Emmy Awards	1999	Outstanding Makeup	Richard Penna, Gina Riggi	Nominated	
GLAAD Media Awards	2000	Outstanding TV Talk	Sally	Nominated	
