= Multimedia Entertainment =

Defunct American television production company

Multimedia Entertainment, Inc.
- Formerly: Avco Broadcasting Corporation Syndicated Division (1968–1972); Avco Program Sales (1972–1976); Multimedia Program Sales (1976–1977); Multimedia Program Productions (1977–1981)
- Type: Subsidiary
- Industry: Television
- Founded: 1968; 58 years ago
- Defunct: February 1997; 29 years ago
- Fate: Folded into Universal Television
- Successor: NBCUniversal Syndication Studios
- Services: Television production; Television distribution
- Parent: Avco Corporation (1968–1976); Multimedia, Inc. (1976–1996); MCA (1996); Universal Studios (1996–1997)
- Divisions: Multimedia Broadcasting (1989–1995); Multimedia Motion Pictures (1991–1995)

Multimedia Entertainment, Inc. (formerly Avco Broadcasting Corporation Syndicated Division, Avco Program Sales, Multimedia Program Sales and Multimedia Program Productions) was an American television production/distribution company originally formed in 1968.

== History ==
The firm was launched, first as Avco Broadcasting Corporation Syndicated Division, and later in 1972 as Avco Program Sales in 1968 as a television production/distribution company owned by the Cincinnati-based Avco Corporation. Another company called Avco Embassy Television (which was sold to Norman Lear and Jerry Perenchio in 1982 and folded into Embassy Telecommunications) was originally responsible for television distribution of the Embassy Pictures film library. In addition, Avco Program Sales concentrated on its own in-house productions. One of its first programs was The Phil Donahue Show, which was launched nationally in 1970. Avco Embassy is the original syndicator of the Phil Donahue Show, before the formation of Avco Program Sales in 1972.

In 1971, Avco Broadcasting Corporation's syndicated unit teamed up with cartoon producer Hanna-Barbera Productions to launch two holiday specials for Thanksgiving and Christmas by 1972. The following year, by 1973, Avco Broadcasting and Meredith Corporation teamed up to produce nine family-oriented television specials for syndication (including the Meredith and Avco stations) by way of its Avco Program Sales division. Also in 1973 Avco attempted a national expansion of The Paul Dixon Show, a Cincinnati-based variety program which aired on Avco's television station group; that effort lasted less than a year.

In 1976, Multimedia, Inc., a Greenville, South Carolina-based newspaper publisher and broadcaster, purchased the production and syndication rights to The Phil Donahue Show and the regionally distributed Bob Braun 50-50 Club from Avco, which was breaking up its media interests. Multimedia also acquired WLWT in Cincinnati, Avco's flagship station, and initially based its syndication division there. The division was first named as Multimedia Program Sales, then as Multimedia Program Productions in 1977, before landing on its Multimedia Entertainment name in 1983. For the next two decades Multimedia Entertainment specialized in audience-participation daytime talk shows with Donahue as its flagship program.

In 1981, Multimedia acquired Show Biz Inc., syndicator of country music television programs such as Pop! Goes the Country. Multimedia also received an agreement with Jim Owens Productions to distribute country-based programs. The company later used Multimedia's St. Louis station KSDK as launching pad for The Sally Jessy Raphael Show in 1983, and WLWT as the original base for The Jerry Springer Show in 1991. Multimedia Entertainment also created TV vehicles for conservative talk radio hosts Rush Limbaugh and Dennis Prager. During this period Bob Turner, a veteran media executive who would later serve as a U.S. congressional representative from New York, served as the company's CEO.

On September 17, 1991, Multimedia acquired Carolco's television operations. Included were distribution unit Orbis Communications (which itself included first-run syndication rights to The Joker's Wild and John Davidson's hosted version of The $100,000 Pyramid) and TV movie production. The Carolco Television Productions unit became Multimedia Television Productions, which was later known as Multimedia Motion Pictures, and Robert Turner has joined the studio as president. Neil Russell was then served as president of the studio several months later. The TV rights to Carolco's film library were not included in the acquisition and were instead eventually licensed to Spelling Entertainment's Worldvision Enterprises in 1992.

Multimedia Entertainment was included in the sale of Multimedia to the Gannett Company in 1995. Gannett then sold its production/syndication arm to MCA in 1996 and a year later it was folded into Universal Television Enterprises in February. In 1998, Universal Television including the USA Networks were sold to Barry Diller and became part of Studios USA.

The rights to the Multimedia Entertainment name were retained by Gannett, and were transferred to Tegna after Gannett split into two companies in 2015; it is now used for the Tegna subsidiary that holds the license for WGRZ in Buffalo, New York (which Gannett had acquired in a swap for WLWT in 1997, shortly after the Multimedia acquisition), while KARE, KPNX, KUSA, KTVD, WTLV, and WJXX operate as Multimedia Holdings Corporation.

Tegna, Multimedia's successor, re-entered the syndication business in 2017 with the series Daily Blast Live and Sister Circle.

== Syndicated programs ==
This is a listing of programs which were either produced or distributed by Multimedia Entertainment:

- Almost Live! (late 1990s)
- Crook & Chase (1996-1997)
- The Pat Bullard Show (1996-1997)
- The Phil Donahue Show / Donahue (1970–1996)
- Rush Limbaugh: The Television Show (1992–1996)
- The Dennis Prager Show (1994–1995)
- The Sally Jessy Raphael Show / Sally (1983–1997)
- Big Break (1990-1991)
- The Jerry Springer Show (1991–1997)
- Sweethearts (1988–1989)
- The $100,000 Pyramid (1991, season 2)
- Young People's Specials (1984–1985)

== Films ==
- Good Old Boy: A Delta Boyhood (a.k.a. The River Pirates) (1988)
- Murder Between Friends (filmed 1993, first broadcast January 10, 1994)

== See also ==
- Avco
- Crosley Broadcasting Corporation (later Avco Broadcasting Corporation)
