= The Ticket (1997 film) =

1997 American television film

- Film Poster
- Written by: David Alexander
- Directed by: Stuart Cooper
- Starring: Shannen Doherty; James Marshall; Phillip Van Dyke
- Music by: Charles Bernstein
- Country of origin: United States
- Original language: English

Production
- Producer: Stuart Cooper
- Cinematography: Curtis Petersen
- Editor: Tim Tommasino
- Running time: 117 minutes
- Production companies: C.N.M. Entertainment Ltd. Wilshire Court Productions

Original release
- Network: USA Network
- Release: August 6, 1997

The Ticket is a 1997 American television film directed and produced by Stuart Cooper and starring Shannen Doherty, James Marshall and Phillip Van Dyke. It aired on the USA Network.

== Plot ==
Cee Cee Reicker accepts to fly with her husband, Keith and her son to get a 23 million dollars prize, that her husband won. The plane is forced to land somewhere on a snowy mountain. She later discovers that their plane crash isn't really accidental.

== Cast ==
- Shannen Doherty as CeeCee Reicker
- James Marshall as Keith Reicker
- Phillip Van Dyke as Eric Riecker

== Reception ==
Phillip Van Dyke was nominated for the Young Artist Award in the category of "Best Performance in a TV Movie/Pilot/Mini-Series - Supporting Young Actor" for his performance in this movie.
