= The Amanda Show =

American television series (1999–2002)

- Genre: Sketch comedy; Variety show
- Created by: Dan Schneider
- Starring: Amanda Bynes; Drake Bell; Raquel Lee; Nancy Sullivan; John Kassir; Josh Peck
- Theme music composer: Stewart Copeland
- Composer: Richard Tuttobene
- Country of origin: United States
- Original language: English
- No. of seasons: 3
- No. of episodes: 46 (list of episodes)

Production
- Executive producers: Dan Schneider; Brian Robbins; Mike Tollin; Joe Davola
- Producers: Keiren Fisher; Andrew Hill Newman; Robin Weiner; Virgil L. Fabian; Steven Molaro
- Production locations: Nickelodeon on Sunset; Hollywood, California; Sunset Gower Studios
- Camera setup: Videotape; Multi-camera
- Running time: 23 minutes
- Production companies: Tollin/Robbins/Davola; Nickelodeon Productions

Original release
- Network: Nickelodeon
- Release: October 16, 1999 – September 21, 2002

Related
- All That; Drake & Josh

The Amanda Show is an American sketch comedy and variety show television series created by Dan Schneider and starring Amanda Bynes that aired on Nickelodeon from October 16, 1999, to September 21, 2002. A spin-off of All That, another Nickelodeon variety show featuring Bynes, The Amanda Show's cast members include Drake Bell, Nancy Sullivan, John Kassir, Raquel Lee, and Josh Peck. Writers for the show include Christy Stratton, Jenny Kilgen, Dan Schneider, John Hoberg, Steven Molaro, and Andrew Hill Newman.

The Amanda Show was abruptly canceled after the third season, which left an unresolved plot line in the recurring sketch "Moody's Point". Bynes pursued roles in Schneider's feature film Big Fat Liar and the Schneider-created television series What I Like About You for The WB. Schneider would later cast series regulars Bell, Peck, and Sullivan in his follow-up Nickelodeon series, Drake & Josh.

Decades after the series' end, allegations by cast and crew members have detailed salary discrimination, sexism, inappropriate behavior, and sexual abuse at Nickelodeon during the show's run that were not previously revealed publicly. The Amanda Show is one of several series highlighted in these accusations, which are summarized in the 2024 documentary Quiet on Set: The Dark Side of Kids TV.

== Format ==
The Amanda Show is a sketch comedy television program set in a universe in which it is broadcast as a popular television comedy (a show-within-a-show). Recurring sketches include "Judge Trudy", a spoof of the courtroom reality Judge Judy; "So You Want to Win Five Dollars?", a spoof of the ABC game show Who Wants to Be a Millionaire?; "Moody's Point", a spoof of the teen drama Dawson's Creek; and "Blockblister", a spoof of the now-defunct video rental store Blockbuster. The show also featured Bynes playing her own superfan, a character called Penelope Taynt.

== Episodes ==
Season	Episodes	Originally released	
Season	Episodes	First released	Last released
1	13	October 16, 1999	February 19, 2000
2	17	July 15, 2000	April 7, 2001
3	10	January 19, 2002	September 21, 2002
The Best of...	6	March 23, 2002	May 18, 2002

== Cast ==
- Amanda Bynes – Herself, Penelope Taynt, Judge Trudy, Blini Blokey, Amber, Doreen, Cynthia Worthington, Moody Fallon, Crazy Courtney, Candy Tulips, Katie Klutz, Lula Mae, Cindy Extreme, Sharon, Melody, Mother Caboose, Babs Wrestleberg, People Place Owner, various others
- Nancy Sullivan – Herself, Miss Yumbo, Mrs. Klutz, Marcy Stimple, Mrs. DeBoat, Mrs. Rostensan, Mrs. Extreme, Ms. Berkle, various others
- Drake Bell – Himself, Carter Klutz, Totally Kyle, Biscotti Blokey, Jeremy Pivers, Eenis, Tony Pajamas, Toby, Thad, Curtis McPeen, Jason Fima, Calvin Stubbs, various others
- Raquel Lee – Herself, Sheila, various others
- John Kassir – Himself, Carl Klutz, Mr. Rostensan, Gnocchi Blokey, Doreen's Dad, Mr. Gullible, Principal Thorn, various others
- Josh Peck – Himself, The Dancing Lobster 2, Paulie, Gerald Phillip, Gordy Moller, various others

=== Supporting cast ===
- Brian Ahearn – Various
- E. E. Bell – Barney the Security Guard, Kreblock
- Steffani Brass – Various
- Gregg Berger – Announcer
- Danny Bonaduce – Customer, Mr. McOliver
- Matthew Botuchis – Sternum
- Jillian Bynes – Babysitter
- Ashley Edner – Rebecca Fyoomay, various
- Carey Eidel – Moody's Dad
- Taylor Emerson – Preston Taynt
- Shayna Fox – Audience Member, Margie Finkus
- Taran Killam – Spaulding
- Steven Anthony Lawrence – Various
- Maureen McCormick – Moody's Mom
- Lara Jill Miller – Kathy
- Jenna Morrison – Debbie, LunchBay.com spokesperson, Julie
- Andrew Hill Newman – Mr. Gullible, Gnocchi Blokey, various
- Molly Orr – Misty Rains, Girl, Zit Girl
- Lauren Petty – Brie, Babysitter
- Reagan Gomez-Preston – Sheila
- Jeremy Rowley – Customer
- Dan Sachoff – Doreen's Dad, Mr. Extreme
- Dan Schneider – Mr. Oldman, Announcer, additional voices
- Francesca Marie Smith – Amanda's Friend, Girl
- Jamie Snow – Tammy, Customer, Amy Drummel
- Kyle Sullivan – Hershal, Boy
- Radley Watkins – Various
- Gary Anthony Williams – Bailiff

== Background and production ==
At age 10, Amanda Bynes was performing stand-up comedy in Hollywood at the Laugh Factory when Nickelodeon's talent scouts, including Dan Schneider, took notice and offered her a role on the network's live-action variety series All That. Finding success on the series, Bynes appeared in an array of guest roles in film and television as well as a recurring panelist role on Nickelodeon game show Figure It Out. Nickelodeon president Albie Hecht noted Bynes' "amazing star quality" and called her "a little Carol Burnett."

On October 16, 1999, The Amanda Show, an All That spin-off created by series producer Dan Schneider, premiered in the Saturday evening prime time slot on Nickelodeon, which released AmandaPlease.com, a tie-in website, around the same time. The series was filmed in front of a live studio audience at Nickelodeon on Sunset in Hollywood, California. Beginning with the second season, John Kassir and Raquel Lee left the series, and Josh Peck was added as a series regular.

After three seasons, the series run concluded on September 21, 2002. Regarding her departure from Nickelodeon in 2002, Bynes stated, "I knew I didn't want to be a Nickelodeon kid when I was 30. I was having fun but at 15, you don't want to be doing what you did when you were 12." Bynes would go on to star in Schneider's What I Like About You for The WB, and Bell and Peck would co-star in Nickelodeon's Drake & Josh, also created by Schneider.

=== Controversy and Quiet on Set documentary ===
In 2024, Drake Bell revealed publicly that he had been sexually abused by dialogue coach Brian Peck (Note: Brian Peck is not related to Bell's co-star Josh Peck.) in 2001, after the production of The Amanda Show when Bell was around 15 years old. Peck had been arrested in 2003 and sentenced to 16 months in prison and being required to register as a sex offender in 2004, but the identity of the minor victim had not previously been made public. Bell's testimony coincided with the lead-up to Quiet on Set: The Dark Side of Kids TV, an Investigation Discovery documentary detailing allegations of abuse from people who worked on Nickelodeon's television productions from the 1990s to the 2000s, specifically series involving Dan Schneider.

Christy Stratton and Jenny Kilgen, two writers who primarily worked during the series' first season, presented further allegations that Schneider's writers' room was rife with inappropriate language and behavior to the point that "Dan was showing pornography on his computer screen", according to Kilgen. The two were allegedly required to split a single salary during their time at Nickelodeon. A gender discrimination and hostile workplace lawsuit filed in 2000 alleged that Schneider inappropriately requested massages from the crew, but it was settled out of court. These allegations were reported publicly as early as 2022, following the release of iCarly star Jennette McCurdy's book I'm Glad My Mom Died.

In an interview video uploaded on March 19, 2024, one day after the conclusion of Quiet on Set, Schneider apologized for some of the claims, especially those for his demeanor at the time, stating, "It was wrong. It was wrong that I ever put anyone in that position. It was wrong to do. I'd never do it today. I'm embarrassed that I did it then. I apologize to anybody that I ever put in that situation". He denied having a role in the writers' salaries, stating that it was a common practice for writers to share salaries. Regarding Bell's experience, Schneider, who denied involvement in the network's decision to hire Peck, stated, "When Drake and I talked and he told me about what happened, I was more devastated by that than anything that ever happened to me in my career thus far", and provided support for Bell, calling the ordeal the "darkest part of my career".

Following the Quiet on Set revelations, Bell reported on social media that his Amanda Show and Drake & Josh co-star Josh Peck had "reached out to talk with me and help me work through this. And has been really, really great".

== Release ==
=== Broadcast ===
The Amanda Show premiered on Nickelodeon's 8:30 PM segment of SNICK on October 16, 1999, and new episodes aired until September 21, 2002. Nickelodeon carried reruns of The Amanda Show during its TEENick block until September 5, 2007. On October 13, 2007, reruns started airing as part of the "TEENick on The N" block on The N. Reruns were pulled in March 2008 before airing again from April 4, 2009, to August 3, 2009. The series' original TV rating was TV-Y7, but was changed to TV-G, like all of the other shows that aired on the former TEENick block on Nickelodeon.

On July 11, 2011, the British Nicktoons channel began airing the series; it showed weekdays at 9:00 p.m. Some episodes missing from broadcast included three episodes (episodes 3, 8, 11 and 12) from Season 1, three Season 2 episodes (episodes 3, 7 and 14), and four episodes from Season 3 (episodes 1, 2, 6 and 10). Reasons for these episodes not being shown are unknown.

Nickelodeon Canada began airing the series on September 5, 2011, with the exception of Season 1 episodes 8 and 12 (which featured musical guests), and Season 3 episode 11. The series was removed from the schedule on June 3, 2013.

Reruns of The Amanda Show started airing on TeenNick on October 11, 2011. Although it was originally announced as part of TeenNick's 1990s block The '90s Are All That, the series instead aired as a standalone series during the daytime. The show would later return on September 17, 2012, and aired in two-hour blocks, until being removed again on March 17, 2013. The series later premiered on The Splat (later NickSplat and NickRewind) on June 10, 2016, and on August 27, 2017, as part of a SNICK 25th anniversary marathon, before briefly returning again in 2020.

In April 2025, the show began airing on the free streaming service Pluto TV, airing during late night hours on the Nickelodeon 90's Kids 2 channel.

=== Home media and streaming services ===
Three volumes of The Amanda Show were released on VHS and DVD beginning on October 5, 2004. Four Best Of volumes released exclusively on iTunes from 2008 to 2013. Later manufacture-on-demand releases were made available through Amazon beginning on March 12, 2012. Two releases, Volume 4: Penelope's Picks and Volume 5: Trudy's Duties, were canceled after initially being scheduled to release on July 12, 2005, and September 20, 2005, respectively.

As of June 2026, the first two seasons are available to stream on Paramount+. Episodes 10, 11, 12, 13, 216, and 217 are unavailable.

Title	Released	Format	Notes
Amanda, Please!	October 5, 2004	VHS and DVD	Includes episodes 214 and 217. DVD exclusives are episodes 222 and 226.
The Girls' Room	October 5, 2004	VHS and DVD	Includes episodes 216 and 219. DVD exclusives are episodes 224 and 228.
Totally Amanda	February 22, 2005	VHS and DVD	Includes episodes 215 and 220. DVD exclusives are episodes 223 and 225.
The Best of Volume 1	July 29, 2008	iTunes	Includes episodes 2, 3, 10, 11 and 13.
The Best of Volume 2	June 22, 2009	iTunes	Includes episodes 210, 216, 217, 219 and 220.
The Best of Volume 3	May 16, 2011	iTunes	Includes episodes 222, 223, 224, 225 and 226.
The Best of Volume 4	January 8, 2013	iTunes	Includes episodes 227, 228, 229, 230 and 231.
The Best of Season One	March 13, 2012	DVD (Note: Manufactured on demand (MOD) on DVD-R.)	Includes episodes 2–4, 6, 7, 9–11, and 13.
Season Two	March 13, 2012; September 15, 2020 (re-release)	DVD	Includes episodes 14–30 (the entire season two).
Season Three	March 13, 2012	DVD	Includes episodes 31–40 (the entire season three).
The Best of The Amanda Show	March 13, 2012	DVD	Includes the six best-of episodes.

== Reception ==
The Amanda Show has been met with mostly positive reviews since its premiere. Within weeks of its debut, AmandaPlease.com, the series' official website, had attracted 150,000 hits and received 16,000 emails. The series became the highest-rated live-action program on Nickelodeon during its run, and its primetime slot in Nickelodeon's SNICK block, which was shared with 100 Deeds for Eddie McDowd, further boosted its popularity. Bynes commented on her stardom in a 2000 interview, stating, "It feels like it's unreal. [...] I love doing what I'm doing. And for kids to watch me and come up to me and say they want to be like me, it's a really big honor."

Dan Schneider, creator and producer of the series, spoke highly of Bynes' talent on All That as it progressed to the star's spin-off series, stating, "You have to feed kids the material; you do have to invent it for them. A lot of kids can regurgitate lines -- the Olsen twins when they first started on Full House. Schneider further stated, "To find a kid who can play the daughter or son on a sitcom is tough, but to find a kid who can do what Dana Carvey and Eddie Murphy do, you (have to) look at 2,000 before you find her. I've never seen anything like Amanda."

In a review from the Fort Worth Star-Telegram, the series was described as "constant beating-up, peeing, zits, flatulenct, etc. Much of the time, it didn't even make sense."

Bynes was a breakout star from working on The Amanda Show and experienced high commercial success since, starring in a variety of projects such as She's the Man (2006), Hairspray (2007), and Easy A (2010), before taking a hiatus from entertainment to focus on her mental health amid struggles with drugs and alcohol.
