= Richard Kline =

American actor and television director (born 1944)

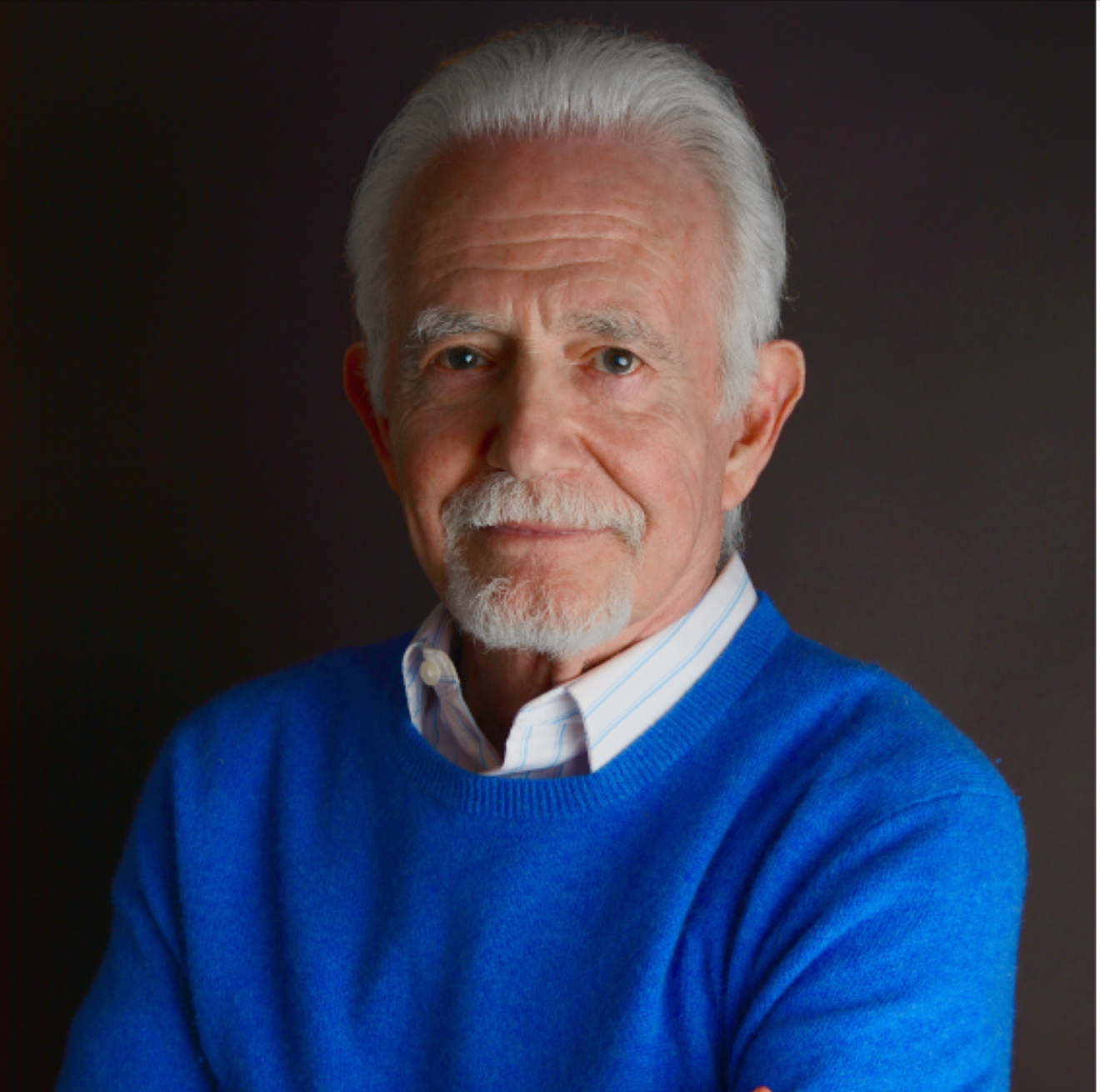
- Born: April 29, 1944 (age 82); Queens, New York City, U.S.
- Occupations: Actor, director
- Years active: 1971–present
- Military service
- Allegiance: United States
- Branch: United States Army
- Service years: 1969–1971
- Rank: First Lieutenant
- Unit: 101st Airborne Division
- Wars: Vietnam War
- Website: www.richardkline.tv

Richard Kline (born April 29, 1944) is an American actor and television director. His roles include Larry Dallas on the sitcom Three's Company. He also played Richie in the later seasons of It's a Living and Jeff Beznick in Noah Knows Best.

== Early life ==
Kline was born on April 29, 1944 in New York City. He was raised in Queens by parents who practiced Reform Judaism. He attended Queens College and has a Master of Fine Arts degree in theater from Northwestern University. After graduation, he joined the United States Army and served in Vietnam during the Vietnam War as a lieutenant.

== Career ==
Kline became involved in theater and made his professional debut in 1971 as part of the Lincoln Center Repertory Company. Regional theater productions during this period included Chemin de Fer (in Chicago with actor Dennis Franz), Death of a Salesman, and Love's Labour's Lost. A classically trained singer, Kline made his Broadway career debut in the 1989 musical City of Angels.

On Three's Company, Kline played Larry Dallas, a sleazy playboy neighbor, used car salesman, and best friend to John Ritter's Jack Tripper. Kline appeared in 110 episodes of Three's Company from 1977 to 1984, also reprised the character in the spin-off shows The Ropers (1979) and Three's a Crowd (1985). Larry has the distinction of being the only other character besides Jack Tripper to appear on Three's Company and both of its spin-offs. As of 2026, Kline along with Joyce DeWitt are the last surviving original cast members of Three's Company.

In addition to his television and big screen appearances, Kline has hosted two game show pilots, Jumble in 1988 and To Tell the Truth in 1990. The show's rights were then sold to NBC with Gordon Elliott, then Lynn Swann and Alex Trebek later hosting. Kline's TTTT pilot did air on the East Coast as a mistake on September 3, 1990, the day the show debuted. He also subbed for Charles Nelson Reilly as a guest panelist on Sweethearts for a week of shows in December 1988. His game show celebrity appearances included both The $25,000 Pyramid and The $100,000 Pyramid, Super Password, and multiple appearances on the Match Game-Hollywood Squares Hour. Kline told SitcomsOnline.com he would like to compete on Jeopardy!, joking, "but I'm afraid I would take all their money!"

In February 2010, he was cast as the Wizard in the first national tour of Wicked.

Kline was seen next in October 2011 in It Shoulda Been You, directed by David Hyde Pierce and starring Tyne Daly. In 2016, Kline appeared in a movie directed by and starring Mike Birbiglia called Don't Think Twice.

Kline reunited with Three's Company cast members Joyce DeWitt, Jenilee Harrison, and Priscilla Barnes in September 2016 at The Hollywood Show in suburban Chicago, an autograph and memorabilia event, meeting fans and signing autographs.

Kline played Kid Twist in the Paper Mill Playhouse world premiere production of The Sting starring Harry Connick Jr. which ran April 8–29, 2018. In December 2018, he joined the national tour of the musical Waitress through August 2019. He reprised the role in the Broadway cast in July 2019.

== Selected filmography ==
- Executive Suite (TV) (1976) Herb Lavin
- Serpico (TV) (1976) - Herschel
- The Mary Tyler Moore Show (TV) (1976) - Prosecutor
- Eight Is Enough (TV) (1977) - Mr. Corelli
- Fernwood 2 Night (TV) (2 episodes, 1977) - Dr. Stanley Turnbull
- Seventh Avenue (TV) (1977) - Horton
- Maude (TV) (3 episodes, 1977–78) - Tuggy McKenna
- Three's Company (TV) (110 episodes, 1977–84) - Larry Dallas
- America 2 Night (TV) (1978) - Dr. Stanley Turnbull
- The Ropers (TV) (1979) - Larry Dallas
- Whew! (TV) (1979, 1980) - Himself
- The Love Boat (TV) (1981)
- Peter-No-Tail (1981) - Bill (US version)
- Three's a Crowd (TV) (1985) - Larry Dallas
- Hotel (TV) (1985) - Gerald Phelps
- It's a Living (TV) (9 episodes, 1985–88) - Richie Gray
- You Again? (TV) (1986) Geraldo
- Murder, She Wrote (TV) (1986) - Larry Kinkaid
- Hill Street Blues (TV) (1987) - Arnold Resnick
- The Law & Harry McGraw (TV) (1987) - Stanley Kaufman
- St. Elsewhere (TV) (1987) - Michael
- Hunter (TV) (1987) - Michael Edleton
- Matlock (TV) (1988) - The Umpire
- Problem Child (1990) - Additional Voice (voice)
- Father Dowling Mysteries (TV) (1991) - Harold Berman
- NYPD Blue (TV) (1993)
- Columbo (TV) (1994) - Lou Caten
- L.A. Law (TV) (1994) - Mr. Pembrook
- Family Matters (TV) (1995) - Mr. Fleming
- Step by Step (TV) (1995) - Mr. Sloan
- The Bold and the Beautiful (TV) (1995–96) - Dr. Mark Benson
- Married... with Children (TV) (1996) - Flint Guccione
- Beverly Hills Ninja (1997) - Driver
- The Nanny (TV) (1997) - Guest Appearance in Episode 04/24
- Treehouse Hostage (1999) - Principal Ott
- Liberty Heights (1999) - Charlie, Nate's Assistant
- That '70s Show (TV) (1999) - Ted
- Warm Blooded Killers (1999) - Ush
- Noah Knows Best (TV) (13 episodes, 2000) - Jeff Beznick
- Saving Silverman (2001) - Acrobat Announcer (voice, uncredited)
- Judging Amy (TV) (2001) - Daryl Hoeller
- Inside Schwartz (TV) (2002) - Gene Schwartz
- Gilmore Girls (TV) (2002) - Miles Hahn
- Jane White Is Sick & Twisted (2002) - Anchor Chris Jobin
- ER (TV) (2004) - Risk Assessment Expert
- NYPD Blue (TV) (2004) - Barry Driscoll
- Karroll's Christmas (2004) - Bradley Carchet
- To Kill a Mockumentary (TV) (2006)
- Knight to F4 (2005) - Truman Fetcher
- I Now Pronounce You Chuck & Larry (2007) - Mr. Auerbach
- Jack and Jill (2011) - Theatergoer #1
- The Americans (2013-2016) three episodes - Bill Hanson
- Don't Think Twice (2016) - Mr. Coughlin
- Blue Bloods (TV) two episodes (2020, 2022) - Judge Angioli
- The Resident (TV) (2021) - George Criforth
- Around the Sun (2022–23) - MJ / Daniel
- The Mick and the Trick (2024)
