= Virgil L. Fabian =

American television producer

- Occupations: Television director, producer, stage manager
- Years active: 1989–2007

Virgil L. Fabian is an American television director and producer. He is best known for his directing episodes of the Nickelodeon series All That, Kenan & Kel, The Amanda Show and Drake & Josh. In 2001, he received an ALMA Award nomination for his directing work on The Brothers García.

His last directing credit was for a 2007 episode of Drake & Josh. In March 2024, Fabian was featured in the documentary series Quiet on Set: The Dark Side of Kids TV. On the show, he alleged that Dan Schneider was behind a toxic work environment and that he would frequently "yell and scream."

== Credits ==
- The All New Mickey Mouse Club (1989, director)
- Allegra's Window (1994–1996, director)
- Family Matters (1995, second assistant director)
- The Mystery Files of Shelby Woo (1996, stage manager)
- Kenan & Kel (1997, stage manager; 1998–2000, director)
- All That (2000–2004, director and producer)
- The Amanda Show (2000–2002, director)
- The Brothers García (2000–2001, director)
- Drake & Josh (2004–2007, director)
- The Adventures of Tango McNorton: Licensed Hero (2006, TV short film, producer)
- Quiet on Set: The Dark Side of Kids TV (2024, self)
