= Cleghorne =

Cleghorne may refer to:

- Ellen Cleghorne (born 1965), American comedian and actress
- Cleghorne!, American sitcom starring Ellen Cleghorne
