= Yooka =

Yooka may refer to:

- Yooka, a character in Yooka-Laylee
- Yooka, a character in Season 3 of Drake & Josh
