= Lane Napper =

American actor and dancer

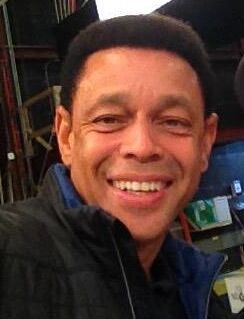
- Napper during the filming of Sam & Cat series in 2013
- Born: June 22, 1967 (age 59); Alexandria, Virginia, U.S.
- Occupations: Actor; choreographer; dancer; acting coach; dancing teacher
- Years active: 1997–present

Lane Napper (born June 22, 1967) is an American actor, choreographer, dancer, acting coach, and dance teacher.

== Personal life ==
Lane Napper has his personal acting school called "Camp PULSE Acting Workshop with Lane Napper" where he teaches the new talent to act like their favorite television stars, also he gives the students dancing lessons at his school. Napper is the choreographer of the American K-pop band EXP during their musical tour. He also gives dancing lessons at the Broadway Dance Center.

== Filmography ==
=== As actor ===
Year	Title	Role	Notes
1997	Cosby	Tap Dancer	Episode: "Shall We Dance"
1998–1999	Suddenly Susan	Lane, Richard	3 episodes
1999	For Your Love	Singing Puppy	Episode: "The Paper Chase"
2000–2002	Nikki	Dancer, Waiter, Croupier, Maitre’D, Customer, Mike	8 episodes
2002	The Drew Carey Show	Dispatcher (voice)	Episode: "A Shot in the Dark"
2002	My Adventures in Television	Pitchman	Episode: “Diversity”
2004, 2007	Drake & Josh	Academic Bowl Host, Andy	2 episodes: "Smart Girl", “Really Big Shrimp"
2007	Custodial Groove		Short
2007, 2010	iCarly	Dancing Teacher, Ernie	2 episodes: “iDream of Dance”, "iWas a Pageant Girl"
2010–2012	Victorious	Lane Alexander	19 episodes
2011	iParty with Victorious	Lane	TV Movie
2018	Kevin Can Wait	Gate Agent	Episode: “Fight or Flight”
2018	Jessica Jones	Vernon	Episode: “AKA Pray for My Patsy”
2018	Consensus Reality	Doctor Weaver	
2018	The Good Cop	Uniform Cop	Episode: “Who Cut Mrs. Ackroyd in Half?”
2021	tick, tick... BOOM!	Bookstore Dancer	
2022	FBI: Most Wanted	Det. Camps	Episode: "Karma"
2023	The Other Two	Paparazzo	Episode: "Cary Pays Off His Student Loans"

=== As choreographer ===
Year	Title	Notes
1999	Suddenly Susan	Episode: "The Cheerleaders"
2000–2001	Nikki	3 episodes
2003–2004	All That	3 episodes
2007	Drake & Josh	Episode: "Dance Contest"
2007-2008	iCarly	9 episodes
2010–2013	Victorious	29 episodes
2013	Sam & Cat	Episode: "#BabysittingCommercial"
2015–2017	Game Shakers	4 episodes
2015, 2017–2018	Henry Danger	7 episodes
2017	The Carnival Kid	Short
2018	Livin' On a Prairie	TV Movie
2019	Youthful Faces	Short; also writer

=== As dialogue coach ===
Napper participated as dialogue coach in some Nickelodeon television series.

Year	Title	Notes
2004–2007	Drake & Josh	26 episodes
2005–2006	Zoey 101	17 episodes
2006	Drake and Josh Go Hollywood	TV Movie
2007–2009	iCarly	26 episodes
