= Density (disambiguation) =

Density is defined as the ratio of mass per unit volume.

Density may also refer to:

== Physics ==
=== Density of mass ===
- Area density or surface density, mass over an area
- Bulk density, mass of a particulate solid or powder divided by the volume it occupies
- Linear density, mass over a line
- Neutral density, mass density of seawater
- Particle mass density or true density, density of the particles that make up a particulate solid or a powder
- Relative density, a measure of density in comparison to the density of something else
- Vapour density, a relative density used for gases

=== Other ===
- Number density, number of particles per unit volume, area, or length
- Optical density, the absorbance of a material

== Mathematics ==
=== Number theory ===
- Natural density, also called asymptotic density
- Dirichlet density
- Schnirelmann density

=== Geometry ===
- Density (polytope)
- Density on a manifold
- Packing density
- Tensor density in differential geometry

=== Other fields ===
- Density (graph theory), the fraction of possible edges that exist in a graph

== Other scientific fields ==
- Density (computer storage), a measure of the quantity of information bits that can be stored on a computer storage medium
- Nutrient density, the proportion of any array of a single nutrient or nutritional factor, or of numerous nutrients in foods
- Plant density
- Population density, population per unit land area
- Spectral density, the distribution of power into frequency components in signal processing
- Urban density, in urban planning and design

== See also ==
- Density 21.5 – a piece of music for solo flute written by Edgard Varèse
- Earth Passage – Density, a 1981 album by American jazz saxophonist Joseph Jarman and percussionist Don Moye
- Dense (film), a 2004 film
- Dense set
- Concentration
- Flux
- Intensity (physics)
