= The Right Temptation =

2001 film by Lyndon Chubbuck

- Theatrical release poster
- Directed by: Lyndon Chubbuck
- Written by: Larry Brand
- Produced by: David Forrest; Neva Friedenn
- Starring: Kiefer Sutherland; Dana Delany; Rebecca De Mornay
- Edited by: Lawrence A. Maddox
- Music by: Phil Marshall
- Distributed by: Columbia TriStar Home Video; Showcase Entertainment
- Release date: May 2001
- Running time: 95 minutes
- Country: United States
- Language: English

The Right Temptation is a 2000 American mystery erotic thriller film directed by Lyndon Chubbuck and starring Kiefer Sutherland, Rebecca De Mornay and Dana Delany. The film was released in United Kingdom on August 21, 2000. In United States the film was released the following year by Columbia TriStar Home Video.

The film is the second collaboration between Kiefer Sutherland and Rebecca De Mornay, the first being The Three Musketeers (1993).

== Plot ==
A former police officer, Derian McCall (Rebecca De Mornay), hands in her badge then she and a colleague, open a detective agency. One day Anthea (Dana Delany) walks in, the wife of a wealthy investor, Michael Ferrow-Smith (Kiefer Sutherland). Anthea asks Derian to flirt with Michael to see if he is unfaithful, suggests using her as a bait to seduce Anthea's husband.

Derian bumps into Michael at his racket ball club. She gets his Rolex watch and returns it at his office. He invites her for a drink, and she tells him she used to be vice cop working undercover, but now doing insurance claims. He says he's married, and didn't want to give her the wrong impression as he's not a cheater.

Anthea says she wanted to uncover Michael's business deals, involving high risk transactions. She claims he's violent and even hit her on occasion, and that she fears for her own death.

One night, Derian wakes up to see someone rummaging through her papers. He overpowers her, but her pet pig comes to help. She stabs the intruder but he manages to escape. Police arrive and take her statement.

Michael and Derian get together for drinks again, and she tells him about the break-in. He says he couldn't stop thinking about her, and wants to take care of her, because he's in an empty marriage. He thinks Anthea might be seeing someone, and he would like to hire Derian as a detective to tail Anthea.

So Derian starts following Anthea with a photographer, Travis, who takes photos of Anthea meeting up with a strange man in his apartment. Derian confronts Anthea and ends their relationship.

Travis phones Derian about the man in the photo, but is killed before he can give her further details.

Anthea calls Derian saying Michael may kill her. She claims to have gone up to his office with a gun, tells Derian she only shot at the ceiling and that he's upstairs. She calls the cops as Derian goes upstairs with the gun. But there on the bed, Derian sees a dead body, and is soon arrested by the cops as the prime suspect for Michael's murder. As Derian is handcuffed, Anthea smiles evilly.

Derian is visited by Falco in jail, and remembers that Travis called her about a picture. She sees the photo, and infers that the man in it had a cut on his shoulder and was probably the intruder in her home. He might be the dead corpse, so Michael could fake his own death, and run away with Anthea.

Anthea is arrested as a material witness to a homicide while boarding a flight as Alice Jones. Michael goes up to his office and opens a safe to see Derian. He says he loves her, and that no one was supposed to get hurt. When he turns around with a gun in his hand, Derian shoots him and he falls several floors atop of a car.

== Cast ==
- Kiefer Sutherland as Michael Farrow-Smith
- Rebecca De Mornay as Derian McCall
- Dana Delany as Anthea Farrow-Smith
- Adam Baldwin as Captain Wagner
- Joanna Cassidy as Maryanne
- Michael Ralph as Falco
- Robert Jayne as Travis
- Neil Flynn as Max

== Production ==
The film was shot in Utah, United States.
