= Space: Above and Beyond =

American science fiction TV series (1995–96)

- Genre: Science fiction
- Created by: Glen Morgan; James Wong
- Starring: Lanei Chapman; Kristen Cloke; Joel de la Fuente; James Morrison; Rodney Rowland; Morgan Weisser
- Theme music composer: Shirley Walker
- Country of origin: United States
- Original language: English
- No. of seasons: 1
- No. of episodes: 23

Production
- Production location: Queensland, Australia
- Running time: 45 minutes
- Production companies: Village Roadshow Pictures; Hard Eight Pictures; 20th Television

Original release
- Network: Fox
- Release: September 3, 1995 – June 2, 1996

Space: Above and Beyond is an American science fiction television series that aired on Fox, created and written by Glen Morgan and James Wong. Planned for five seasons, it only ran for one season from 1995 to 1996 before being canceled due to low ratings. It was nominated for two Emmy Awards and one Saturn Award. Ranked last in IGN's top 50 Sci-Fi TV Shows, it was described as "yet another sci-fi show that went before its time."

Set in the years 2063–2064, the show focuses on the "Wildcards", members of the United States Marine Corps 58th Squadron of the Space Aviator Cavalry. They are stationed on the space carrier USS Saratoga, acting as both infantry and pilots of SA-43 Endo/Exo-Atmospheric Attack Jet ("Hammerhead") fighters, battling an invading force of extraterrestrials.

== Plot ==
Lacking technology that would enable faster-than-light (FTL) travel, colonization is accomplished by taking advantage of transient but predictable, naturally occurring wormholes in space, which allow travelers to traverse vast distances. Without warning, a previously unknown alien species, the "Chigs", attack and destroy Earth's first extra-solar colony and then destroy a second colony ship. The bulk of the Earth military forces sent to confront the Chigs are destroyed or outflanked, in part because the Chigs have some form of FTL, affording them greater freedom of movement (although this technology appears limited, the Chigs also often use natural wormholes).

At the opening of the series, the Chigs have defeated all counter-attacks and have entered the Solar System. In desperation, unproven and under-trained outfits like the 58th "Wildcards" are thrown against the Chigs. The Wildcards are the focus of the series, which follows them as they grow from untried cadets into veterans. Although the unified Earth forces come under the control of a reformed United Nations (UN), the UN has no formal armed forces, so navies such as the U.S. Navy and the Royal Navy operate interstellar starships.

Prior to the events of the show, there was a war between humans and androids known as Silicates. These human-looking androids, referred to as "walking personal computers", rebelled, formed their own societies, and waged a guerrilla war against the humans from remote bases. The Silicates are also suspected of conniving with the Chigs. To defeat the Silicates, a new underclass of genetically engineered and artificially gestated humans were bred to quickly swell the ranks of the military. These troops, collectively known as In Vitroes or sometimes, pejoratively, "tanks" or "nipple-necks", are born at the physical age of 18 and trained solely for combat. In the post-war period, the "tanks" have attempted (with mixed success) to re-enter human society.

== Episodes ==
No.	Title	Directed by	Written by	Original release date	Prod. code
1 2	"Pilot"	David Nutter	Glen Morgan & James Wong	September 3, 1995	3S01–A 3S02–B
A human colony sixteen light-years away is attacked and destroyed by an unknown alien force (the "Chigs") while a group of youngsters enlist in the United States Marine Corps. While they train to become aviators, war is declared and human military forces suffer several costly defeats. The recruits are sent on a routine training mission where captured enemy information reveals the apparent battle plans of the alien attackers. The half-trained 58th the Wild Cards squadron, based upon the space carrier USS Saratoga is deployed to the far rear. However, not everything is as it seems, and the inexperienced 58th are suddenly thrown into a desperate battle (the Battle of the Belt). Note: Originally aired as 2-hour movie.
3	"The Farthest Man from Home"	David Nutter	Glen Morgan & James Wong	October 1, 1995	3S01
The Space carrier USS Saratoga passes close to the planet Tellus where human colonists were ambushed. Hoping that his missing girlfriend Kylen somehow survived, Lt. West goes AWOL with a Hammerhead and flies down to the planet.
4	"The Dark Side of the Sun"	Charles Martin Smith	Glen Morgan & James Wong	October 8, 1995	3S02
The Wild Cards are sent to secure a major fuel ore mining facility, to find it in the hands of Silicates.
5	"Mutiny"	Stephen Cragg	Stephen Zito	October 15, 1995	3S03
The 58th travel upon a civilian cargo hauler. The ship is attacked, and the captain decides to sacrifice part of his In Vitro cargo in order to save his ship. A mutiny forces Hawkes and McQueen, both In Vitroes, to make a difficult decision.
6	"Ray Butts"	Charles Martin Smith	Glen Morgan & James Wong	October 22, 1995	3S04
A mysterious Lt. Colonel arrives unexpectedly on the USS Saratoga. Recruiting the Wild Cards for a classified mission, he changes the mission's objective as soon as they are behind enemy lines.
7	"Eyes"	Felix Alcala	Glen Morgan & James Wong	November 5, 1995	3S06
The Secretary-General of the United Nations is assassinated by an In Vitro. The UN assembly decides to gather aboard the USS Saratoga to choose a replacement, while a mandatory loyalty test is imposed upon all In Vitroes in the military, including Lt. Colonel McQueen and Cooper Hawkes. Meanwhile, West is informed that high-ranking UN officials knew about the alien threat before the colonists were sent to the Vesta colony.
8	"The Enemy"	Michael Katleman	Marilyn Osborn	November 12, 1995	3S05
While escorting military supplies to the contested planet Tartarus, the 58th become victims of a Chig mind-altering weapon. Unable to control their innermost fears, they begin to turn on each other.
9	"Hostile Visit"	Thomas J. Wright	Peyton Webb	November 19, 1995	3S07
The USS Saratoga captures a Chig bomber, and McQueen suggests that they use the vessel as a Trojan Horse. The plan is to attack the aliens' home base in order to raise troop morale, but the plan goes horribly wrong. Note: Part 1 of 2.
10	"Choice or Chance"	Felix Alcala	Doc Johnson	November 26, 1995	3S08
The 58th crash-land on a moon deep inside enemy territory, and Wang, West, Vansen, and Damphousse are captured by Silicates, while Cooper and McQueen manage to flee and evade capture. Wang is tortured and broken by a ruthless Silicate, while West discovers that Kylen is among other prisoners. A Silicate says that either Vansen or Damphousse will die and leaves the choice up to them. The Wild Cards attempt to escape. Note: Part 2 of 2.
11	"Stay with the Dead"	Thomas J. Wright	Matt Kiene & Joe Reinkenmeyer	December 3, 1995	3S09
Suffering a brain concussion, West is rescued among the corpses of several U.S. Marines. His incoherent ravings that the 58th are still alive are dismissed due to an earlier transmission in which West stated that all his comrades were dead.
12	"The River of Stars"	Tucker Gates	Marilyn Osborn	December 17, 1995	3S10
When the 58th are trapped inside a damaged space APC stranded deep inside enemy territory on Christmas Day, they receive a cryptic transmission which tells them how to "hitch a ride" back to safety upon an incoming comet's orbit.
13	"Who Monitors the Birds?"	Winrich Kolbe	Glen Morgan & James Wong	January 7, 1996	3S11
Undertaking a covert assassination operation in exchange for an honorable discharge, Cooper Hawkes is wounded while his team member is killed. All alone inside enemy territory, he struggles to stay alive and is haunted by visions of death trying to seduce him in the incarnation of Shane Vansen. He remembers his past In Vitro education and how he was scheduled to be terminated because he asked too many questions.
14	"Level of Necessity"	Thomas J. Wright	Matt Kiene & Joe Reinkenmeyer	January 14, 1996	3S12
After experiencing an anomalous precognition which saved the lives of the 58th, Damphousse is investigated by a Marine Colonel in charge of the psy operations. The Colonel is convinced that she possesses psychic powers and deduces that only true mortal danger activates her precognition. Therefore, he joins the 58th in a very dangerous mission.
15	"Never No More"	James Charleston	Glen Morgan & James Wong	February 4, 1996	3S13
Several fighter squadrons gather upon the USS Saratoga in preparation for a rumored, future offensive. Vansen meets a former boyfriend, who is now the Captain of the 35th the Faithful squadron. A single enemy fighter ace, nicknamed "Chiggy von Richthofen", is rumored to be hunting and destroying entire squadrons. The brass decides that all knowledge about "Chiggy von Richthofen" has to be suppressed and officially denied by all high-ranking officers for the sake of morale. A spy satellite has to be deployed for the planned invasion; the 35th gets the assignment, and Vansen decides to transfer to that unit. McQueen, risking a court-martial, gives her a warning to be extremely cautious. Note: Part 1 of 2.
16	"The Angriest Angel"	Henri Safran	Glen Morgan & James Wong	February 11, 1996	3S14
A plan to trap and destroy "Chiggy von Richthofen", who pilots a prototype stealth space fighter, fails. Lt. Colonel T. C. McQueen, a survivor of the destroyed elite 127th the Angry Angels squadron, prepares himself to search, find, and engage the enemy ace. Note: Part 2 of 2.
17	"Toy Soldiers"	Stephen Posey	Marilyn Osborn	February 18, 1996	3S15
West is upset when his younger brother, who has joined the U.S. Marines, arrives upon the USS Saratoga under the command of an inexperienced, foolish, Gung-ho Second Lieutenant.
18	"Dear Earth"	Winrich Kolbe	Richard Whitley	March 3, 1996	3S16
The members of the 58th receive letters from home - some with good news, some with bad, while McQueen and Cooper are ordered to cooperate in a TV documentary about In Vitroes serving in the United States Marine Corps.
19	"Pearly"	Charles Martin Smith	Richard Whitley	March 24, 1996	3S18
On a planet overrun with Chigs, the 58th retreat with a tank driver of the U.S. 7th Cavalry upon a tank named "Pearly". They encounter the eccentric Major Cyril MacKendrick, sole survivor of a battalion of the British Coldstream Guards. Wang again encounters a Silicate of the same model that previously tortured him.
20	"R&R"	Thomas J. Wright	Jule Selbo	April 12, 1996	3S19
The exhausted Wild Cards are granted R&R aboard the Bacchus, a pleasure ship where it is said anything can, and does, happen.
21	"Stardust"	Jesus Trevino	Howard Grigsby	April 19, 1996	3S20
A mysterious group of extremely high-ranking officers disembark on the USS Saratoga, and the 58th are ordered to escort an unresponsive space APC. The mysterious APC suddenly locks onto their Hammerhead fighters and opens fire.
22	"Sugar Dirt"	Thomas J. Wright	Matt Kiene & Joe Reinkenmeyer	April 20, 1996	3S17
A planetary invasion by Earth military forces is ambushed and turns into a military disaster. There is no air support and no ground reinforcement as the supporting fleet, among it the USS Saratoga, is forced to abandon 25,000 stranded troops in order to launch another assault, which could ultimately save millions of lives, upon a more strategic planet. Among the scattered, abandoned, and demoralized troops are the 58th, who are struggling to survive.
23	"And If They Lay Us Down to Rest ..."	Vern Gillum	Glen Morgan & James Wong	May 26, 1996	3S21
The Wild Cards land on the moon of the Chig's home planet and encounter an extraterrestrial creature, which may be an entirely different life form or an unarmoured Chig. Soon afterwards, the enemy proposes a truce.
24	"... Tell Our Moms We Done Our Best"	Thomas J. Wright	Glen Morgan & James Wong	June 2, 1996	3S22
While peace talks on the USS Saratoga go awry, the disgraced 58th are sent to retrieve POWs trapped in a crippled space APC. Several enemy space fighters attack, and the 58th takes heavy losses. It is discovered that the Chigs are only offering peace because they know Earth's military will defeat them.

== Cast and characters ==
Cast (from left to right): Cloke, de la Fuente, Weisser, Morrison, Rowland, Chapman.

=== Wildcards ===
- Kristen Cloke — Capt. Shane Vansen (USMC), callsign in the first episodes "Ace of Diamonds", later changed to "Queen of Diamonds".
- Morgan Weisser — 1st Lt. Nathan West (USMC), callsign "King of Hearts", his Hammerhead is named "Above and Beyond".
- Rodney Rowland — 1st Lt. Cooper Hawkes (USMC, In Vitro), callsign "Jack of Spades", his Hammerhead is named "Pag's Payback" after one his pals that was killed in battle.
- Joel de la Fuente — 1st Lt. Paul Wang (USMC), callsign "Joker".
- Lanei Chapman — 1st Lt. Vanessa Damphousse (USMC), callsign "Ace of Hearts".
- James Morrison — Lt. Col. Tyrus Cassius "T. C." McQueen (USMC, In Vitro) callsign "Queen 6".

=== Recurring ===
- Tucker Smallwood — Commodore Glen van Ross (USN)
- David Jean Thomas — General Alcott (USMC)
- David St. James — Admiral Broden (USN)
- Amanda Douge — Kylen Celina (Aero-Tech, Tellus colonist)
- Tasia Valenza — 1st Lt. Kelly Anne Winslow (USMC) callsign "Queen of Spades"
- Edmund L. Shaff — "Chaplain" (USN)
- Bill Hunter — Secretary General Spencer Chardwell (UN)
- Robert Crow — Officer Crow (Lt. Pruitt in last episode) (USN)
- Doug Hutchison — Elroy EL (AI)
- Kimberly Patton — Feliciti OH (AI)
- John Lendale Bennett — "Master at Arms" (USN)
- Michael Mantell — Howard Sewell (Aero-Tech, member of the board of directors)
- James Lesure — Lt. Charlie Stone (USMC)
- Melissa Bowen — LTJG Stroud (USN)
- Gennie Nevinson, Loren Chase — Anne West
- Angus Grant, Marc Worden — Neil West (Private, USMC)
- Iva Franks-Singer — Sabrine EW (AI)
- Kristian Sorensen - Chig

=== Guest stars ===
- Coolio — The Host (in episode "R & R")
- Amanda Douge — Kylen Celina (in episodes "Pilot", "Choice or Chance", "...Tell Our Moms We Done Our Best")
- David Duchovny (uncredited) — Alvin El 1543 aka "Handsome Alvin" (Silicate in episode "R & R")
- Dale Dye, Capt., USMC (ret.) — Major Jack Colquitt (USMC) (in episode "Who Monitors the Birds?")
- R. Lee Ermey, GySgt., USMC (ret.) (uncredited) — Sergeant Major Frank Bougus (USMC) (in the pilot episode)
- Adam Goldberg — Sergeant 1st Class Louie Fox, Seventh Cavalry, U.S. Army (in episode "Pearly")
- Steve Rankin — Lieutenant Colonel Raymond Thomas Butts, callsign "Kick Butts" (in episode "Raymond Butts")
- Harriet Sansom Harris — Ambassador Diane Hayden (Secretary General, UN)
- Richard Kind — Colonel Burke (in episode "Level of Necessity")
- Martin Jarvis — Major Cyril MacKendrick (British Army - in episode "Pearly")
- Ronald G. Joseph — General Oliver Ranford (USMC) (in episode "Stardust")
- Gail O'Grady (uncredited) — Colonel Klingman (in episode "Stardust")
- Jennifer Balgobin — Communications Lieutenant Price (USN) (in episode "Sugar Dirt")

== Production ==
While drawing comparisons with Robert Heinlein's novel Starship Troopers and the film, according to the producers, the main fictional work that influenced Space: Above and Beyond was one written in response to that story, the 1974 science fiction novel The Forever War by Joe Haldeman. In addition, it was inspired by fictional works, such as the 1948 World War II biographic novel The Naked and the Dead by Norman Mailer, the 1895 American Civil War novel The Red Badge of Courage by Stephen Crane, the Iliad, and the 1962 television series Combat! At the same time, Space: Above and Beyond also shares conspiracy elements with other television shows co-produced by the same team, such as The X-Files and Millennium.

=== Cinematography and visual effects ===
The series featured a very dark and desaturated color grading, apparently inherited from the cinematography of series as The X-Files and Millennium, co-produced by the same team, but taken to a greater extreme. The strength of desaturation employed in many scenes reaches the level that makes them almost black and white (quantitatively, the saturation in CIE xy color subspace of a typical scene in Space: Above and Beyond is in the range 0.03–0.15, approximately 1/4 of a typical contemporary film or television program).

With the increasing affordability of computer systems with performance suitable for 3D rendering, Space: Above and Beyond relied heavily on computer generated imagery (CGI) for space scenes with physical special effects still playing a significant role. The computer generated effects of Space: Above and Beyond were created by the visual effects company Area 51 using NewTek LightWave 3D. In 1996, the team at Area 51 were nominated for an Emmy Award, for Outstanding Special Visual Effects, with each member being named.

=== Music ===
Wong and Morgan were looking for a more traditional musical approach than the synthesiser scoring favored on The X-Files; visual effects supervisor Glenn Campbell introduced the producers to the music of Shirley Walker, who had worked on Batman: The Animated Series. Wong and Morgan were initially unconvinced on hearing Walker's synth demos, until it was explained that her musical ideas would be filled out by an orchestra. Wong went on to describe the scoring session as "(his) favorite part of filmmaking." Walker scored the pilot and the entire series, receiving an Emmy nomination for "The River Of Stars," and she reunited with Wong and Morgan on many of their later projects (her final film score was for their remake of Black Christmas).

In 2011, La-La Land Records issued a three-disc limited edition featuring Walker's score for the pilot and music from most of the episodes ("The Enemy", "Choice or Chance", "Level of Necessity", "R&R", and "Stardust" do not have any score cues on the album).

=== Sound effects ===
The sound effects used on the show are often reused on the animated series Futurama.

=== Criticism ===
The actor Joel de la Fuente described his perception of a possibly stereotypical nature of his character Lt. Paul Wang, for which he felt discomfort for the role of "a cowardly soldier who betrayed his comrades":

Whenever I see Asians in military uniform, I cannot help but recall common images of Asians from the Vietnam War and World War II. They were "yellow-bellied cowards" who took the lives of loyal Americans. They were treacherous and crafty, impossible to gauge. Wang could be seen as all of these stereotypes, I thought. Even though this ignores the fact that the Americans they were killing had invaded their country and napalmed their children, but people tend to leave out the important details...

== Other media ==
Space: Above and Beyond was released on DVD in the United States and Canada by 20th Century Fox as a set of five DVD-10 discs on November 8, 2005. Episodes feature closed captioning, and the set also contains some of the original television promotional advertisements for the series. Certain pressings feature a distorted image of the Babylon 5 space station, which is unrelated to and does not appear in the series, on the discs' title screens.

In 2011, Space: Above and Beyond was released on Region 2 PAL DVD in Germany by KSM GmbH.

In April 2012, Space: Above and Beyond was released on Region 2 PAL DVD in the UK by Fremantle Media / Medium Rare Entertainment. It contained a new documentary, cast interviews, some episode commentaries, galleries, and deleted scenes. The pilot episode is included in the full season set but has also been released separately with just a commentary.

There were several books and comic books released as well based on the show's episodes.
