= Nikki (TV series) =

American television sitcom

- Genre: Sitcom
- Created by: Bruce Helford
- Starring: Nikki Cox; Nick von Esmarch; Susan Egan; Toby Huss
- Composer: Ed Alton
- Country of origin: United States
- Original language: English
- No. of seasons: 2
- No. of episodes: 41 (6 unaired)

Production
- Executive producers: Michael Curtis; Bruce Helford; Bob Myer; Deborah Oppenheimer
- Producers: Heather MacGillvray; Linda Mathious; Nikki Cox
- Cinematography: Wayne Kennan
- Editors: Larry Harris; Pam Marshall; Tucker Wiard
- Camera setup: Multi-camera
- Running time: 22–24 minutes
- Production companies: Mohawk Productions; Warner Bros. Television

Original release
- Network: The WB
- Release: October 8, 2000 – January 27, 2002

Nikki is an American television sitcom that aired on The WB from October 8, 2000, to January 27, 2002. Nikki was a starring vehicle for Nikki Cox, who had previously starred in another WB sitcom, Unhappily Ever After, which ran for five seasons. Looking to capitalize on Cox's popularity, Bruce Helford created a sitcom that featured her as the title character.

== Synopsis ==
Cox portrays Nikki White, a Las Vegas showgirl living in Las Vegas with her husband Dwight White (Nick von Esmarch), a professional wrestler. The couple is portrayed as working class, attempting to follow their passions while finding fame and fortune in Las Vegas. Also in the cast are Nikki's best friend and fellow dancer Mary (Susan Egan), and Dwight's boss Jupiter (Toby Huss). Also a recurring character were Dwight's mother Marion (Christine Estabrook), who is angry with Nikki for "luring" her son into a marriage and away from a safe, secure job with a future as a tax attorney; Ken and Alice Gillespie (Todd Robert Anderson and Jacqueline Heinze), Nikki and Dwight's conservative neighbors;

In season one, each episode started with a musical number, where Nikki and her fellow showgirls at "the worst casino in Las Vegas" perform a dance. Their costumes included Godzilla, cockroaches (dancing to "We Are Family"), brides who remove their dresses and veils to reveal red devil costumes and horns, and once she appeared as the severed head of Marie Antoinette. In the second episode of season two, Nikki loses her job when the casino is sold.

Similar to Murphy Brown, all of the episodes in season one, plus some in season two, have a different song as the theme song, while Nikki performed a dance routine. However, in season two, the theme song changed to a standardized intro, to a remixed version of "She's a Lady" by Tom Jones.

== Cast ==
=== Main ===
- Nikki Cox as Nikki White
- Nick von Esmarch as Dwight White
- Susan Egan as Mary Campbell
- Toby Huss as Jupiter

=== Recurring ===
- Brad William Henke as Thor
- Steve Valentine as Martine
- Christine Estabrook as Marion
- Marina Benedict as Luna
- Todd Robert Anderson as Ken Gillespie
- Jacqueline Heinze as Alice Gillespie
- Arturo Brachetti as Antonio

=== Notable guest stars ===
- Ever Carradine as Patti ("Fierce")
- Lisa Marie Varon as Chickasaurus ("Topless")
- Phil LaMarr as Richard ("The Next Step", "Milli Vanikki")
- Arden Myrin as Cheryl ("The Ex Factor")
- Kevin Nash as The Big Easy ("Stealing Nikki", "Gimme Shelter")
- The Fabulous Moolah as herself ("The Jupiter and Mary Chain")
- Kathy Kinney ("Let It Ride")
- Randy Savage as Pretty Boy ("Fallback" 14)
- Joel McKinnon Miller as Mr. Higgins ("Fallback")
- Amanda Bearse as Marcy Rhoades ("Technical Knockup")
- David Garrison as Steve Rhoades ("Technical Knockup")
- Meredith Bishop as Lurleen ("Technical Knockup", "Vaya Con Nikki")
- Drew Carey as Barry Tenzer, a business magnate who buys CWF ("Superhero Blues")
- Sheryl Underwood as Janet ("Working Girl")
- Ian Gomez
- The Blue Meanie
- Leslie Hoffman stuntwoman as an Audience Member ("I'll Kick Your Ass")

Carrie Ann Inaba, Cris Judd, Lane Napper, and Nancy O'Meara appeared in multiple episodes as dancers and in various minor roles.

== Production ==
In July 1999, The WB placed a straight-to-order series from The Drew Carey Show co-creator Bruce Helford as a vehicle for Unhappily Ever After and Norm co-star Nikki Cox. Nikki was formally ordered to series in May 2000, and was placed on The WB's fall lineup for a Sunday Night comedy block.

On October 31, 2000, The WB ordered a full 22-episode season of Nikki. The network renewed the show for a 22-episode second season at its upfronts in May 2001. However, in January 2002, the network pulled the series, and shut down production after only 19 episodes due to low ratings. Six episodes were left unaired in the United States.

== Episodes ==
=== Series overview ===
Season	Episodes	Originally released	
Season	Episodes	First released	Last released
1	22	October 8, 2000	May 20, 2001
2	19	October 14, 2001	January 27, 2002

=== Season 1 (2000–01) ===
No. overall	No. in season	Title	Directed by	Written by	Original release date	Prod. code	US viewers (millions)
1	1	"Fierce"	Gerry Cohen	Bruce Helford	October 8, 2000	226151	3.41
2	2	"Humiliated"	Gerry Cohen	Scott Buck	October 15, 2000	226153	2.49
3	3	"Topless"	Gerry Cohen	Laura Perkins Brittain	October 22, 2000	226152	2.74
4	4	"No Sex, No Mary, No Title"	Gerry Cohen	Jill Soloway	October 29, 2000	226154	2.81
5	5	"Won't You Beat My Neighbor?"	Shelley Jensen	Bill Diamond	November 5, 2000	226155	3.43
6	6	"The Next Step"	Steve Zuckerman	Rich Amend & Stephen Marlin	November 12, 2000	226159	3.08
7	7	"The Ex Factor"	Gerry Cohen	Rich Amend & Stephen Marlin	November 19, 2000	226161	2.59
8	8	"Stealing Nikki"	Shelley Jensen	Rachel Powell	November 26, 2000	226156	3.11
9	9	"The Crybaby Who Stole Christmas"	Shelley Jensen	Ben Wexler & Laura Perkins Brittain	December 17, 2000	226160	2.75
10	10	"Bottoms Up"	Gerry Cohen	Amanda Lasher	January 7, 2001	226164	2.90
11	11	"The Jupiter and Mary Chain"	Steve Zuckerman	Ben Wexler	January 14, 2001	226158	2.59
12	12	"Let It Ride"	Shelley Jensen	Story by : Les Firestein; Teleplay by : Scott Buck & Jill Soloway	January 21, 2001	226163	2.60
13	13	"Dream Weaver"	Gerry Cohen	Maria Espada	February 4, 2001	226165	3.16
14	14	"Fallback"	Shelley Jensen	Ben Wexler	February 11, 2001	226166	2.97
15	15	"Cheerleader of Doom"	Shelley Jensen	Tom Martin	February 18, 2001	226167	2.80
16	16	"I'll Kick Your Ass"	Joe Regalbuto	Kirk J. Rudell & Rachel Powell	February 25, 2001	226162	2.95
17	17	"One Wedding and a Funeral"	Steve Zuckerman	Rich Amend & Stephen Marlin	April 1, 2001	226170	2.88
18	18	"Dwight and Nikki and Ken and Alice"	Steve Zuckerman	Ben Wexler	April 8, 2001	226169	3.15
19	19	"Schisler's List"	John Fuller	Kirk J. Rudell	April 29, 2001	226171	2.28
20	20	"And the Winner Is..."	Shelley Jensen	Rick Nyholm	May 6, 2001	226168	2.67
21	21	"Love at First Dwight"	Steve Zuckerman	Tom Martin	May 13, 2001	226172	2.57
When one of Nikki's old high school friends visits, Dwight finds out that Nikki did not like him at first, and only saw him as a ticket to Las Vegas. Meanwhile, Jupiter hires Mary to try the wrestlers for the calendar shoot.
22	22	"Family Lies"	Steve Zuckerman	Kirk J. Rudell	May 20, 2001	226157	2.64

=== Season 2 (2001–02) ===
No. overall	No. in season	Title	Directed by	Written by	Original release date	Prod. code	US viewers (millions)
23	1	"Technical Knockup"	Gerry Cohen	Ben Wexler	October 14, 2001	227153	2.4
A trip to the doctor leads to Nikki discovering she has a limited time to have a baby.
24	2	"Vaya Con Nikki"	Shelley Jensen	Kirk J. Rudell	October 21, 2001	227156	2.26
When Nikki is laid off after the casino is sold, she is forced to resort to being a waitress. One of her new friends, Stacy (Danielle Fishel), attempts to create a rift between her and Mary.
25	3	"A Rock and a Hard Place"	Shelley Jensen	Rick Nyholm	October 28, 2001	227152	2.4
26	4	"Superhero Blues"	Shelley Jensen	Alicia Sky Varinaitis	November 4, 2001	227157	2.08
When a businessman (Drew Carey) buys out the wrestling organization, Dwight finds himself out of a job and tries to get it back. Meanwhile, Nikki and Mary compete to get a role in a music video, but have to find a way to leave their jobs at a comic book convention first.
27	5	"My Best Friend's Day Care"	Gerry Cohen	Gigi McCreery	November 11, 2001	227158	2.91
28	6	"Home Sweet Homeless"	Gerry Cohen	Heather MacGillvray & Linda Mathious	November 18, 2001	227159	2.5
29	7	"Take This Job and Love It"	Shelley Jensen	Michael Bornhorst	November 25, 2001	227160	2.61
30	8	"Gimme Shelter"	Bob Koherr	Amanda Lasher	December 9, 2001	227161	2.08
31	9	"Milli Vanikki"	Gerry Cohen	Scott Buck & Les Firestein	December 16, 2001	227154	2.24
32	10	"Through Thick and Thin"	Shelley Jensen	Heather MacGillvray & Linda Mathious	January 6, 2002	227162	2.43
33	11	"To Your Grave"	Shelley Jensen	Rick Nyholm	January 13, 2002	227163	2.8
34	12	"Nikki Can't Wait for Dwight's Birthday"	Amanda Bearse	Michael Bornhorst	January 20, 2002	227164	2.0
35	13	"She Was a Job-Jumper"	Shelley Jensen	Ben Wexler	January 27, 2002	227165	2.1
36	14	"Welcome to the Rest of Your Life"	Shelley Jensen	Michael Curtis & Rick Nyholm	Unaired	227151	N/A
37	15	"Uneasy Rider"	John Fuller	Alicia Sky Varinaitis	Unaired	227167	N/A
38	16	"My Two Left Feet" "Gotta Dance"	Gerry Cohen	David Grubstick	Unaired	227168	N/A
39	17	"GED Off My Back"	Gerry Cohen	John N. Huss	Unaired	227169	N/A
40	18	"Working Girl"	Shelley Jensen	Kirk J. Rudell	Unaired	227155	N/A
41	19	"Portrait of the Wrestler as a Young Man"	Shelley Jensen	Kirk J. Rudell	Unaired	227166	N/A

== Syndication ==
The show currently airs in the Netherlands on Comedy Central Family, MTV3 Sarja in Finland, and Kanal 9 in Sweden.
