= Michael Ralph =

American actor

- Born: Waterbury, Connecticut, U.S.
- Occupations: Actor; comedian
- Years active: 1989–present
- Relatives: Sheryl Lee Ralph (sister)

Michael Ralph is an American actor and comedian. He is known for his recurring roles as Spencer Boyer on the sitcom A Different World, Tyrell Livingston on Cleghorne! and as Kelly on The Bernie Mac Show.

== Career ==
Some of his other television credits include Martin, Moesha, The Parkers, All of Us, The Suite Life on Deck, Numb3rs, The Sinbad Show and Renegade.

He also appeared in the films Marked for Death (1990), Malcolm X (1992) and Nickelodeon television film Drake & Josh Go Hollywood (2006). Ralph has also provided his voice in numerous video games. He also provided additional voices for Happy Feet Two and Frozen II.

== Personal life ==
He is the younger brother of actress Sheryl Lee Ralph.

== Filmography ==
=== Film ===
Year	Title	Role	Notes
1989	Do the Right Thing	Guy by Water Hydrant	Uncredited
1990	Marked for Death	'Monkey'	
1992	Malcolm X	Crowd Member #3	
1994	National Lampoon's Last Resort	Flesh	Direct-to-Video
1994	Drop Squad	Trevor	
1994	Scenes from the New World	Myles	
1998	Woo	Romaine	
2000	The Road to El Dorado	Various	Uncredited
2000	The Right Temptation	Falco	
2001	Blow	Inmate #2	
2002	The Rules of Attraction	Guest	
2004	Dense	Julius	TV Short
2007	Totally Baked	Debater Steve	(Segment "Reunion Party")
2009	12 Rounds	Additional Voices	
2009	Blue	Chip	
2011	Happy Feet Two	Additional Voices	
2013	The Call	Additional Voices	
2013	The Dark Party	Hex	
2013	Marafon	Passer	
2016	Serial Dater	Donald	
2017	Crown Heights	Additional Voice Actor	
2019	Frozen II	Additional Voices	
2020	Blue: The American Dream	Chip	
2022	Strange World	Additional Voices	

=== Television ===
Year	Title	Role	Notes
1992–1993	A Different World	Spencer Boyer	Recurring role
1994	The Sinbad Show	Leon	Recurring role
1994	The Commish	Isaac Caldwell	Episode: "Born in the USA"
1995	Cleghorne!	Tyrell Livingston	Series regular
1996	Rebound: The Legend of Earl "The Goat" Manigault	Dion	TV movie
1997	Moesha	Calvin Campbell	Episode: "Hakeem's Birthday"
2000	The Parkers	Lonnie Cochran	Episode: "Heir Today, Gone Tomorrow"
2001–2006	The Bernie Mac Show	Kelly	Recurring role
2006	Drake & Josh Go Hollywood	Police Chief Campbell	TV movie
2011	The Suite Life on Deck	Sergeant Pepper	1 episode
2021–2023	What If...?	Additional Voices	6 episodes

=== Video games ===
Year	Title	Role
2001	Star Wars: Galactic Battlegrounds	Steadfast Driver, Torpedo Launcher Drive
2001	Star Wars Rogue Squadron II: Rogue Leader	Rebel Wingman 5
2003	Star Wars: Knights of the Old Republic	
2004	The Chronicles of Riddick: Escape from Butcher Bay	Abu Bakr, Craps, Motorhead
2004	Grand Theft Auto: San Andreas	Ballas Gang Member
2005	SWAT 4	SWAT Officer Allen 'Python' Jackson, Jean Trouffant
2005	The Incredible Hulk: Ultimate Destruction	Division Energy
2005	50 Cent: Bulletproof	Masked Assailant
2006	SWAT 4: The Stetchkov Syndicate	SWAT Officer Allen
2007	World in Conflict	
2007	SWAT: Target Liberty	SWAT Officer Allen 'Python' Jackson
2007	TimeShift	Dr. Nathan Tucker, Occupant Insurgent
2009	The Chronicles of Riddick: Assault on Dark Athena	Guard, Abu Bakr, Craps, Motorhead
2009	Prototype	Additional Voices
2014	Wasteland 2	Wade Woodson, Highpool Guard 1
2023	Spider-Man 2	Additional Voices
