= Lanei Chapman =

American actress

- Occupation: Actress
- Years active: 1989–present

Lanei Chapman is an American actress. She has appeared primarily in guest appearances on episodes of various television series, and may be best known for her role as Lt. Vanessa Damphousse in the single 1995–96 season of the series Space: Above and Beyond.

== Career ==
Chapman first appeared on television at the age of 13 in a Kentucky Fried Chicken commercial. She went on to appear in a number of films and television shows, including White Men Can't Jump, Seinfeld, The Wonder Years and China Beach. She made her science fiction television debut in Star Trek: The Next Generation as Ensign Sariel Rager, a recurring character who served as a conn officer in numerous episodes, though she only received an on-screen credit for speaking parts in four episodes.

She made her debut in the series Space: Above and Beyond during the pilot episode, playing main cast character Lt. Vanessa Damphousse. While filming the pilot and the early part of the series, Chapman was on a leave of absence from a post-graduate film production program at the University of Southern California.

She initially auditioned with Randy Stone, senior vice-president of talent and casting at Twentieth Century Fox Television, and then two days later with David Nutter, the director of the pilot. By her own admission, the character did not have a great deal to do in that initial two-part episode, so much so that when she was required to audition, the lines she read were from a different character as they had not yet developed Damphousse. The writers took elements of Chapman's own experiences and backstory and wrote it into the new character's as they were developing her. The series was cancelled after one season, despite an organized fan campaign to renew it.

== Personal life ==
Chapman is a graduate of Dartmouth College with a degree in Spanish. She had originally chosen to major in drama, but switched part-way through after discovering the extent of the foreign language program at the college. She also wrote a short play while there, called Home Run, which she sent to actress Chip Fields to appear in and assist Chapman in directing. She is also a qualified teacher in California, and for a short time taught kindergarten until she chose to pursue acting full-time.

== Filmography ==
Year	Title	Role	Notes
1989	A Mother's Courage: The Mary Thomas Story	Mary (16 years)	
1990	China Beach	Glitter	episode "Souvenirs"
1992	The Importance of Being Earnest	Cecily	
1992	The Wonder Years	Miss Shaw	episode "Kodachrome"
1992	White Men Can't Jump	Lanei	
1992	Martin	Caller #1 (voice)	episode "Things I Do for Love"
1991–1992	Star Trek: The Next Generation	Ensign Sariel Rager, a conn officer of the Enterprise-D	Silently played the role in numerous episodes, only received an on-screen speaking credit in four episodes: episode "Schisms"; episode "Relics"; episode "Night Terrors"; episode "Galaxy's Child"
1992	The Jacksons: An American Dream	Katherine's sister, Hattie	TV Mini Series
1993	Seinfeld	Sid Fields' Housekeeper	episode "The Pilot, Part 2"; episode "The Old Man"
1993	The Secrets of Lake Success	Melanie Jones	
1995–1996	Space: Above and Beyond	Lt. Vanessa Damphousse	episode "...Tell Our Moms We Done Our Best"; episode "And If They Lay Us Down To Rest..."; episode "Sugar Dirt"; episode "Stardust"; episode "R&R"; episode "Pearly"; episode "Dear Earth"; episode "Toy Soldiers"; episode "The Angriest Angel"; episode "Never No More"; episode "Level of Necessity"; episode "Who Monitors the Birds?"; episode "The River of Stars"; episode "Choice or Chance"; episode "Hostile Visit"; episode "The Enemy"; episode "Eyes"; episode "Ray Butts"; episode "Mutiny"; episode "Pilot"
1997	The Pretender	Julie Thorton	episode "Under the Reds"
1998	C-16: FBI	Angela Robinson	episode "My Brother's Keeper"; episode "The Art of War"
2001	Rat Race	Merrill Jennings	
2001–2002	Judging Amy	Winnie Van Exel	episode "The Frozen Zone"; episode "Between the Wanting and the Getting; episode "Everybody Falls Down"
2002	The District	Jenny McClure	episode "Goodbye, Jenny"; episode "Drug Money"
2002–2003	The Division	Prosecutor, District Attorney	episode "Wish You Were Here"; episode "Beyond the Grave"
2004	Dense	Yvette	
2006	Thief	Sheronda Jones	episode "In the Wind"; episode "No Direction Home"
2006	Grey's Anatomy	Lianne Tressel	episode "Sometimes a Fantasy"
2009	Lincoln Heights	Plainclothes police officer	episode "Time to Let Go"; episode "Lucky"
2009	Cold Case	Alice Watson, '91	episode "Read Between the Lines"
2010	The Ties That Bind	Dr. Traci Jones	Short film
2016	Of Thistles and Rye		Short film
2017	F Is For Family	Burger joint waitress (voice)	episode "F Is For Fixing It"
