= Alaina Reed Hall =

American actress and singer (1946–2009)

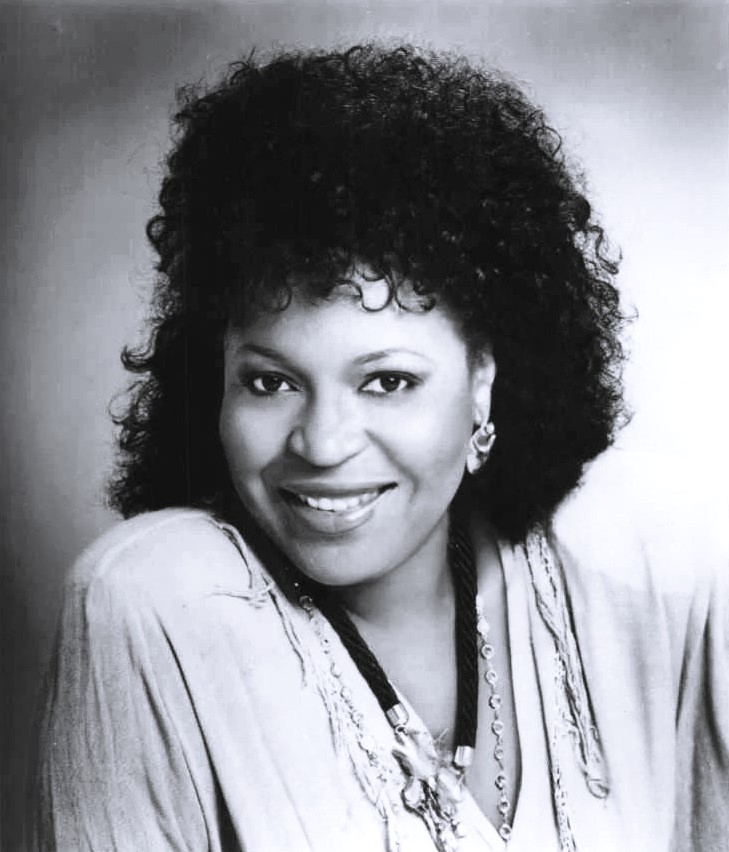
- Reed in 1987
- Born: Bernice Ruth Reed; November 10, 1946
- Died: December 17, 2009 (aged 63); Santa Monica, California, U.S.
- Other names: Alaina Reed; Alaina Reed-Amini
- Education: Kent State University
- Occupations: Actress; singer
- Years active: 1974–2009
- Spouses: Richard Cook (divorced) Kevin Peter Hall (m. 1988; died 1991) Tamim Amini (m. 2008)
- Children: 2

Alaina Reed Hall (born Bernice Ruth Reed; November 10, 1946 – December 17, 2009) was an American actress and singer who portrayed Olivia Robinson, Gordon's younger sister, on the PBS children's television series Sesame Street, and Rose Lee Holloway on the NBC sitcom 227.

== Early life ==
In the mid-1960s, Reed attended Kent State University where she was active in many stage productions at KSU's E. Turner Stump Theater. These included The Streets of New York; It's a Bird, It's a Plane, It's Superman!; and The Tragedy of Tragedies — The Life and Death of Tom Thumb The Great.

Alaina sang in a group called Tiny and the Dunnaways, an all girl singing group in Kent. In late 1966, Glenn Lucas, Bob Boettcher and Bruce Rusin with Alaina "Tiny" Reed and Marty Kralik formed "The Velours". In February 1967. They began playing continuously, at the Kove in Kent, Ohio five nights a week until December 1968.

== Career ==
Reed began her professional career in Philadelphia and off-Broadway productions. She was among the original cast members in the 1974 off-Broadway production of Sgt. Pepper's Lonely Hearts Club Band on the Road. Hall appeared in productions of Hair (Chicago in 1970 and the 1977 revival), Chicago, and Eubie!.

In 1976, she won the role of Olivia on the children's series Sesame Street. Her character was a photographer and the younger sister of Gordon. In 1985, she starred in the Sesame Street movie Follow That Bird, reprising her role as Olivia. That same year, Hall co-starred on the sitcom 227. For a time, she traveled between New York City (where Sesame Street is taped) and Los Angeles (where 227 was taped). She left Sesame Street in 1988.

After 227 ended in 1990, Hall appeared in guest roles on various TV shows, including Herman's Head and Blossom. She also provided the voice for animated characters on Where on Earth Is Carmen Sandiego?. In 1995, Hall co-starred on the short-lived WB sitcom Cleghorne!, starring Ellen Cleghorne. The following year, she appeared in the television film The Cherokee Kid. She also had recurring roles on Ally McBeal, Any Day Now, and ER.

In addition to stage and television work, Hall also appeared in roles in feature films including Death Becomes Her (1992), Cruel Intentions (1999), and the 2007 independent feature I'm Through with White Girls (The Inevitable Undoing of Jay Brooks).

== Personal life ==
She was married three times and had two children.

Her first marriage was to Richard Cook, with whom she had two children. The marriage ended in divorce.

In December 1988, Reed married actor Kevin Peter Hall. She met Hall when he was a guest performer on 227. Kevin Hall died in April 1991.

In 2008, Alaina Hall married Tamim Amini. They were married until her death.

== Death ==
Hall died of breast cancer at Saint John's Health Center in Santa Monica, California on December 17, 2009, at the age of 63. She was cremated, and her ashes were scattered into the Pacific Ocean according to her husband, Tamim Amini.

== Filmography ==
Film
Year	Title	Role	Notes
1985	Sesame Street Presents: Follow That Bird	Olivia	
1992	Death Becomes Her	Martha	
1993	Me and the Kid	Sarah	
1999	Cruel Intentions	Nurse Olivia	
2001	Chasing Sunsets	Mrs. Stevens	
2003	Scrambled	Gert	
2006	The Shift	Mother	
2007	I'm Through with White Girls...	Jerri Moore	
2007	A-Date	Valerie	Short film

Television
Year	Title	Role	Notes
1976–1988	Sesame Street	Olivia Robinson	59 episodes
1978	Cindy	Venus	Television film
1978	Baby, I'm Back	Jackie	Episode: "You Bet Your Wife"
1985–1990	227	Rose Lee Holloway	115 episodes
1991-1993	Harry and the Hendersons	Lorraine Hall	7 episodes
1992	Herman's Head	Margaret Bracken	Episode: "Bracken Up Is Hard to Do"
1992	A Different World	Claims Officer #5	Episode: "Occupational Hazards"
1993	Blossom	Esther Smith	Episode: "Big Doings: Part 2"
1995	Friends	The Admissions Woman	Episode: "The One with Two Parts: Part 2"
1995	Lois & Clark: The New Adventures of Superman	Nurse Doris Berkey	Episode: "Target: Jimmy Olsen"
1995	Cleghorne!	Lena Carlson	15 episodes
1995	The Drew Carey Show	Lois Perry	Episode: "Pilot"
1996	The Cherokee Kid	Ma Holsopple	Television movie
1997	The Steve Harvey Show	Corinthia Grier	Episode: "I Do, I Don't"
1997	Between Brothers	Vera Ford	Episode: "Family Affair"
1997	NYPD Blue	Mrs. Angela Cheevers	Episode: "It Takes a Village"
1997–1998	Ally McBeal	Judge Elizabeth Witt	3 episodes
1998	Caroline in the City	Stanchfield	Episode: "Caroline and the Cabbie"
1999	NewsRadio	Ms. Rose Dawson	Episode: "Apartment"
1998–2000	Any Day Now	Aunt Della Watt	2 episodes
2006	The Suite Life of Zack & Cody	Mrs. Minnie Mayweather	Episode: "Loosely Ballroom"
2007	ER	Betty Dixon	2 episodes
