= USS Saratoga =

USS Saratoga may refer to the following United States Navy warships:

- USS Saratoga (1780), an 18-gun sloop-of-war launched in 1780; lost at sea the following year
- USS Saratoga (1814), a 26-gun corvette built on Lake Champlain for service in the War of 1812
- USS Saratoga (1842), a 22-gun sloop-of-war; commissioned 1843; served until 1888
- USS Saratoga (ACR-2), a later name for the armored cruiser USS New York (ACR-2)
- USS Saratoga (CC-3), a never-completed Lexington-class battlecruiser converted into an aircraft carrier
- USS Saratoga (CV-3), a Lexington-class aircraft carrier commissioned in 1927; active in World War II; was sunk by atomic bomb test in 1946
- USS Saratoga (CV-60), a Forrestal-class supercarrier; commissioned 1956; decommissioned 1994

== See also ==
- USAT Saratoga, a United States Army transport ship in World War I
- Space carrier vessel in Space: Above and Beyond television series
