= List of Drake & Josh episodes =

Drake & Josh is an American teen sitcom created by Dan Schneider for Nickelodeon. It aired from January 11, 2004, to September 16, 2007. Two TV films, Drake & Josh Go Hollywood and Merry Christmas, Drake & Josh, were made apart from the regular series that aired on January 6, 2006, and December 5, 2008, respectively. A total of 56 episodes were aired, spanning four seasons. Drake Bell, Josh Peck, and Miranda Cosgrove appeared in all of the episodes.

== Series overview ==
Season	Episodes	Originally released	
Season	Episodes	First released	Last released
1	6	January 11, 2004	February 22, 2004
2	14	March 14, 2004	November 28, 2004
3	17	April 2, 2005	April 8, 2006
4	19	September 24, 2006	September 16, 2007
Films		January 6, 2006	December 5, 2008

== Episodes ==
=== Season 1 (2004) ===
No. overall	No. in season	Title	Directed by	Written by	Original release date	Prod. code
1	1	"Pilot"	Virgil L. Fabian	Dan Schneider	January 11, 2004	101
Drake Parker (Drake Bell) and Josh Nichols (Josh Peck) are two teenagers who attend the same high school in their hometown of San Diego, California. Drake, an aspiring musician, is a very popular teenager amongst their classmates, while Josh is more of a nerdy teenager, whom Drake wants nothing to do with and describes as "unusual". On top of this, Drake's mom, Audrey (Nancy Sullivan), and Josh's dad, Walter (Jonathan Goldstein), have recently begun dating. One day, Walter and Audrey formally announce to both Drake and Josh, as well as Drake's little sister, Megan (Miranda Cosgrove), that they are getting married. Josh is instantly thrilled about having a new stepbrother, however Drake is horrified at the thought. Drake becomes even more horrified when he learns that Josh is "Miss Nancy", the anonymous advice columnist for their school's newspaper, and that Josh believes he must dress like a woman in order to give adequate advice. Drake then decides to use this information to his advantage in order to secure a date with Tiffany Margolis (Julie Gonzalo), who wrote to Miss Nancy seeking relationship advice. Drake even threatens to reveal Josh's secret to the entire school unless Josh helps him. Unfortunately, it's Josh who winds up in trouble after Tiffany's angered boyfriend, Buck (Joey Mendicino), believes that Tiffany is on a date with Josh instead, challenging him to a fight. On the advice of Drake, Josh then trains under a local karate instructor, but is still knocked out with one punch during the fight. Now feeling guilty over the whole situation, Drake apologizes and helps Josh realize that he can give good advice without wearing his "Miss Nancy" attire. The boys then make up and finally begin to accept each other as stepbrothers.
2	2	"Dune Buggy"	Virgil L. Fabian	Eric Friedman	January 18, 2004	106
Drake and Josh receive a dune buggy from Drake's friend Trevor (Taran Killam), only to be disappointed when they find out that the buggy is in dire need of repair. Meanwhile, Drake convinces Josh to lie after Josh accidentally breaks the TV. However, this only leads to Josh being grounded for doing so. Drake and Josh then fully repair the dune buggy, to the surprise of Walter and Audrey, who then forbid them from driving it. Drake decides to defy their orders and secretly drives the buggy with Trevor anyway, crashing in the process. Drake then attempts to conceal his bruises and wounds, as well as the damage to the dune buggy. However, Josh eventually finds out what happened when he receives a call from the emergency room. Josh then angrily confronts Drake about the incident, calling Drake out for keeping the accident and his injuries a secret from their parents. Racked with guilt, Drake then confesses to Walter and Audrey, and they ground Drake for two weeks, much to Josh's delight. However, due to Drake's injuries, his "punishment" is simply staying home from school and resting, while Josh waits on him hand and foot. Note: This episode received 3.35 million viewers in its first airing.
3	3	"Believe Me, Brother"	Virgil L. Fabian	Dan Schneider	January 25, 2004	102
Drake and Josh are tasked with creating a video for a class project, so the brothers decide to shoot a music video featuring Drake and his band performing their new song, directed by Josh. Meanwhile, Drake's latest girlfriend, Susan (Ashley Drane), begins constantly flirting with Josh behind Drake's back. When Josh eventually tries to explain the situation, Drake refuses to entertain the thought and laughs it off. However, Drake then becomes angry when he catches Susan kissing Josh, wherein Susan convinces Drake that Josh made a move on her first. Josh tries to explain his innocence to Drake to no avail, leading the two brothers to become increasingly distant. However, when Megan secretly inserts a clip of Susan flirting with Josh (along with a few other embarrassing clips) into their music video as an intended prank, Drake learns that Josh was telling the truth the entire time, leading to Drake dumping Susan. The two brothers then thank Megan for her prank and retaliate against Susan by putting purple paint in her locker.
4	4	"Two Idiots and a Baby"	Virgil L. Fabian	Steven Molaro	February 8, 2004	103
Audrey and Walter go out to dinner with Walter's boss, Mr. Galloway, and his wife. Josh has offered to babysit their infant son, Max, much to Drake's chagrin. After Drake and Josh struggle to get Max changed and then put to sleep, Drake leaves to play at a concert, to which Josh angrily chastises him for it. Josh then panics when Max suddenly disappears, leading to Josh frantically attempting to call Drake for help, and eventually becoming stuck on the roof while looking for Max. Meanwhile, at the concert, Drake receives Josh's voicemail and, now racked with guilt, returns home to help Josh find Max. The boys then find Megan in the living room holding a sleeping Max just before Audrey, Walter, and Mr. and Mrs. Galloway return.
5	5	"First Crush"	Virgil L. Fabian	Steve Holland	February 15, 2004	104
Josh develops his first real crush on a classmate named Kathy (Erin Chambers). However, Josh is incapable of approaching her without making things awkward and embarrassing himself. While trying to impress her, Josh accidentally claims he can play the guitar, which he cannot. Upon hearing this, Kathy then invites Josh to her birthday party at the coffee shop, The Brew Note (ran by Josh's former karate teacher), wherein Kathy asks Josh to play her a song, which Josh reluctantly agrees to. Meanwhile, Drake and his band audition for a gig at The Brew Note, which leads to Drake being banned from the shop for life after Megan's pet snake (which she snuck into Drake's backpack as a prank) escapes and scares everyone away. Later, a panicked Josh begs Drake to help him impress Kathy. After several failed attempts at teaching Josh how to actually play guitar, Drake devises a plan which involves Drake playing the guitar in Josh's place at Kathy's party without anyone knowing. However, on the day of the party, their plan only succeeds in making everything worse when they are busted by both Kathy and the shop owner. The next day at school, Josh apologizes to Kathy for lying to her. Kathy accepts Josh's apology, but declines to be his friend. Kathy then finds a framed painting of her from Josh inside her locker, which (unbeknownst to Josh) was placed there by Drake. As the episode ends, Josh makes a future date with Kathy, and she agrees to convince the coffee shop owner to give Drake and his band another audition.
6	6	"Grammy"	Virgil L. Fabian	Andrew Hill Newman	February 22, 2004	105
Megan, Audrey, and Walter leave the house for the weekend. Drake and Josh's dreams of a parent-free weekend are then quickly dashed when Josh's grandmother (Randee Heller), whom he affectionately calls Grammy, comes to babysit. Josh is delighted to have Grammy around, however, Drake does not like her, with Grammy not being fond of Drake either. Drake then plans to attend a concert with his friends, but Grammy forbids him from going on the order of Walter and Audrey. Later, Drake finds out from his friends that the concert tickets are officially sold out, dashing their hopes of even attending the concert in the first place. However, Grammy makes a deal in which Drake can spend time with his friends if he beats her in a basketball game, so long as he does not attend the concert. Drake wins the game, but is forced to break his promise out of peer pressure when his friends suddenly manage to obtain tickets to the concert. Once there, Drake and his friends discover that their tickets have been photocopied and are therefore counterfeit, leading the kids to be detained at the venue until Grammy pays a $200 fine to release them. After an argument then ensues between them, Grammy reveals that she intentionally let Drake win their basketball game so that he could spend time with his friends. Drake does not believe her and challenges Grammy to another game, under the condition that if he wins, no one will tell Walter and Audrey about the concert incident. Grammy agrees on the condition that if Drake loses, he will personally tell his parents about the concert. Drake loses the game and prepares to tell his parents what happened. However, when Audrey and Walter come home, Grammy steps in and stops Drake from telling them. Grammy then explains that since Drake paid her back the $200 and was willing to tell his parents, that was a good enough punishment for her (Grammy instead tells Audrey and Walter that she beat Drake at basketball, leading to ridicule from Walter and Audrey towards him). Drake finally accepts Grammy as family, and they hug each other goodbye. Grammy then secretly sticks an envelope onto Drake's back, paying him back the $200 he gave her.

=== Season 2 (2004) ===
No. overall	No. in season	Title	Directed by	Written by	Original release date	Prod. code
7	1	"The Bet"	Steve Hoefer	George Doty IV	March 14, 2004	202
Drake is heavily addicted to junk food, while Josh is heavily addicted to video games. This lands the boys into serious trouble when they forget to bring Megan home on a rainy day, for which they are both grounded by Audrey. Drake and Josh then make a bet to see who can live without their addictions, with the loser having to dye their hair pink, even going so far as to sign a contract with Megan in order to make it official. After a few days, however, Drake develops a disfiguring facial rash from his sudden change in diet, which can only be cured by eating junk food. Meanwhile, Josh receives a brand new GameSphere as a gift from Grammy, which causes his own urges to run wild. Audrey and Walter then make their own bet over who will win, with the loser also having to dye their hair pink. Walter bets on Drake, and Audrey bets on Josh. Both Drake and Josh are ready to cave when Megan convinces both brothers to try and make the other crack first. Josh turns their bedroom into a candy palace, while Drake plays Josh's GameSphere in front of him. Both boys cave at the same exact moment, and they fight over who caved first. Megan then reveals that it does not matter who caved first due to a loophole in the bet’s contract, meaning that they both lose. Because of this, Audrey and Walter also lose their bet, forcing everyone (except for Megan) to dye their hair pink, much to her amusement. However, when everyone leaves the house the next morning, Drake stays behind for breakfast, where it's revealed that he is only wearing a pink wig.
8	2	"Guitar"	Virgil Fabian	Eric Friedman	March 21, 2004	201
Drake wins concert tickets from a local radio station to see his favorite band, Zero Gravity, as well as receiving backstage passes and an autographed Fender Stratocaster guitar signed by the band's lead guitarist, Devin Malone (Mark Matkevich). However, when Josh plugs the guitar into Drake's faulty amplifier while showing it off to Megan, the guitar explodes. Desperate to make things right before Drake can find out, Josh attempts to buy a new guitar and have it autographed by Devin Malone backstage at the concert. Drake catches Josh in the act and, instead of being angry, is moved that Josh would go to such great lengths for him. However, moments before the concert can begin, Josh accidentally slams the guitar case closed on Devin's hand, breaking it. As the concert is about to be canceled, Josh nominates Drake to perform instead of Devin, and the band's manager agrees. Drake then repays Josh for buying the guitar by giving him the paycheck he earned from performing. Meanwhile, Audrey encourages Walter to bond more with Drake, however Drake is uninterested.
9	3	"Movie Job"	Virgil Fabian	Dan Schneider	March 28, 2004	203
Josh is hired at the Premiere movie theater after unintentionally causing "Crazy" Steve (Jerry Trainor) to quit after complaining about his wobbly cup holder. Josh quickly comes to enjoy his new job, buying many new things with his paychecks, which inspires Drake to work at the Premiere as well. The theater's manager, Helen (Yvette Nicole Brown), immediately begins heavily favoring Drake over Josh, giving Drake all the credit for Josh's hard work, despite Drake's constant laziness. Helen even promotes Drake to assistant manager, much to Josh's annoyance. Desperate for any kind of recognition, Josh seeks Helen's approval by creating a promotion designed to sell more popcorn. Unfortunately, his plan backfires horribly, causing a violent riot amongst the customers. Josh then prepares to accept his fate and tell Helen that the incident was his fault, however Drake takes all the blame, realizing how much the job means to Josh, leading Helen to reluctantly fire Drake. Note: Audrey only appears in the main title sequence.
10	4	"Football"	Virgil Fabian	Eric Friedman	April 4, 2004	205
Drake calls Josh uncool after Josh humiliates him in front of a girl (Leah Pipes) with an unsuccessful magic trick, and encourages Josh to try out for the football team in order to become cool. Josh makes the team as the equipment manager, but Drake still thinks he is uncool. However, Josh is forced to play in a crucial game after the brownies he bakes for the team cause the team's center to fall ill (due to Megan putting dirt from a flower pot into the batter as a prank). Of course, Josh doesn't know how to play football and does not want to play against the toughest team in the state, so Drake sneaks the school janitor (Tony Longo), a former pro who lost his memory as a result of a head injury, into the game in place of Josh. But while playing, the janitor is injured once again, this time regaining his memory, forcing Josh to go and play, where he scores the game-winning touchdown. After the game, Drake finally admits that Josh is cool.
11	5	"Pool Shark"	Steve Hoefer	Anthony Del Broccolo	April 18, 2004	204
Drake discovers that Josh is insanely talented at pool, due to Josh using his knowledge of geometry and physics in order to play the game. Drake then decides to take advantage of this, using Josh to hustle several people behind his back, after being inspired by Megan, who herself hustled Drake while playing darts. After several people complain to him about Drake's gambling at their expense, Josh eventually finds out the truth. He furiously vows never to play pool again, especially after Drake reveals that he still intends to hustle more people should they play again. Meanwhile, Walter sends Drake and Josh out to find a new birthday present for Audrey after she buys the same bracelet he originally planned to give her. On the way, they come across a pool hall, and Josh reluctantly agrees to play pool and let Drake hustle their opponents, on the condition that this will be the last time they ever do so. The brothers then have a match with two thugs, betting $200 (the exact money Walter gave the boys for Audrey's present). When Josh wins, the thugs accuse the boys of hustling and threaten them. A frightened Drake then apologizes and vows to never hustle anyone again. Josh then reveals that this was all a setup by him and his former camp counselors (disguised as thugs) in order to teach Drake a lesson about hustling.
12	6	"Smart Girl"	Roger Christiansen	Dan Schneider	April 25, 2004	207
Drake unintentionally joins the academic team at school to impress Michelle (Kate Lang Johnson), one of the smartest girls in school. Determined to keep up the ruse, Drake has Josh tutor him for the upcoming academic bowl, however Drake retains little to no information that he is taught. Feeling desperate, Drake then convinces a reluctant Josh to feed him the answers through a radio, so that he can lead their school to victory and impress Michelle. On the day of the academic bowl, their plan works and Drake initially gives his team the upper hand. However, a nearby fast food restaurant then interferes with Josh's radio frequency, causing Drake's team to begin losing points. Despite the setback, Drake manages to lead the team to victory on his own, having retained some chemistry knowledge that Josh taught him during their all-night study session. Drake then confesses to Michelle that he is not smart, however Michelle admits that she likes Drake for who he is anyway. Meanwhile, tired of Megan's pranks, Josh attempts to retaliate against her, failing miserably each time. At the end of the episode, Drake and Josh end up being glued to their chairs by Megan.
13	7	"Little Diva"	Virgil Fabian	Eric Friedman	May 2, 2004	208
The Premiere is hosting a world movie premiere starring Ashley Blake (Skyler Samuels), a famous child actress. Helen (Frances Callier) then assigns Josh to be Ashley's personal assistant, much to Josh's dismay due to the frequent and ridiculous requests that Ashley makes. Drake also becomes Ashley's assistant so that Josh will let him attend the premiere's after-party. However, Drake, too, becomes fed up with Ashley's requests. Meanwhile, Ashley befriends Megan, and the two attempt to pull a prank on Drake and Josh by placing a filled-up bucket above their bedroom door. But when Ashley is accidentally knocked out by the bucket while setting up the prank, Drake and Josh must bring Ashley to the Premiere while trying to hide the fact that she is unconscious. Note: Frances Callier replaced Yvette Nicole Brown as Helen in this episode.
14	8	"Blues Brothers"	Fred Savage	Craig DiGregorio	September 12, 2004	206
Josh appears on the local news as the assistant weatherman to Walter, only to have a nervous breakdown after Megan reveals that she learned from Walter that Josh suffers from severe stage fright. This causes Josh to twitch heavily and sweat profusely during the live broadcast. Soon, everyone in San Diego begins mocking Josh, and he falls into a deep depression. Meanwhile, The Premiere holds a talent show where Drake's band is performing. However, a rival boy band steals the song Drake was originally going to perform, forcing him to improvise. Drake then decides to pay tribute to the Blues Brothers, performing a rendition of "Soul Man" along with Josh, whom Drake tries to persuade into doing so After Josh decides to help Drake out, the brothers win the talent show and Josh's confidence is restored.
15	9	"Driver's License"	Virgil Fabian	Eric Friedman	September 12, 2004	209
Drake fails to get his driver's license, while Josh obtains his. However, Josh is soon ticketed for running a stop sign. As Josh fears that Walter will take his license away, Drake offers to pay for the ticket and keep it a secret, on the condition that Josh becomes his personal chauffeur, threatening to reveal his ticket to Walter if he refuses. After reluctantly agreeing to Drake's deal, Josh soon decides he has had enough after Drake forces him to drive his date around while constantly talking down to him. The car's taillight then breaks, resulting in Josh receiving another ticket and attacking Drake for it.
16	10	"Number One Fan"	Virgil Fabian	Eric Friedman	September 19, 2004	211
A girl from Megan's scout troupe, Wendy (Alyson Stoner), has a massive crush on Drake. Her dream is for Drake to personally play her a song. Impressed with all her knowledge of him, Drake gives her an autograph and a guitar pick. Soon after, Wendy becomes obsessed with Drake and will not leave him alone, much to Drake's annoyance. Despite Drake's attempts to gently tell Wendy she should leave him in his space, Wendy takes her obsession with Drake too far by posting flyers everywhere around town promoting an upcoming radio appearance Drake will make with his band. Furious, Drake confronts Wendy and tells her she means nothing to him, breaking her heart. At the radio station, when Drake suddenly needs a guitar pick, he checks his pockets and finds a note from Wendy apologizing for what she did and returning the pick he gave her. Realizing his mistake, Drake reschedules his radio performance, returns home to Wendy, and plays a song just for her, fulfilling her dream. Meanwhile, Josh becomes the leader of the scout troupe after Walter quits due to the children's incessant troublemaking.
17	11	"Mean Teacher"	Steve Hoefer	George Doty IV	September 26, 2004	210
Drake wants to break up with his latest girlfriend Kelly (Chelsea Brummet), due to her habit of obnoxiously laughing in inappropriate situations. However, once Drake finds out that Mrs. Hayfer (Julia Duffy), their school English teacher who hates Drake, is Kelly's mother, Mrs. Hayfer threatens to send Drake to summer school should he break up with Kelly. Josh suggests that Drake should make Kelly break up with him instead, so Drake attempts to do so by acting repulsive during a dinner date, however his plan backfires. Meanwhile, Josh begins wearing a rather ugly shirt, resulting in good things consistently happening to him, such as: Receiving a perfect score on a school assignment, being handed an expensive watch and ring by a feuding couple, being gifted a classmate's entire video game collection, successfully avoiding Megan's pranks, and having Kelly set him up on a date with a teen model who loves magic and video games. Sometime later, Drake, now completely fed up with Kelly's incessant laughter, demands to wear Josh's lucky shirt to their double date. However, Josh refuses, leading to a fight that rips the sleeves off the shirt. Drake wears the sleeves and Josh the torso, however neither date goes well. Josh then agrees to let Drake wear the whole shirt until Kelly breaks up with him, then give the shirt back to Josh for the rest of the night. Sure enough, Kelly breaks up with Drake, much to his delight, and Josh's date takes a liking to him, even kissing him. The next day, the boys find that the shirt is gone, having been donated to Goodwill by Audrey on the suggestion of Megan. Initially angry, the boys overcome it by convincing themselves that the shirt was not lucky. During the end credits, a hobo wins the lottery jackpot while wearing the shirt.
18	12	"The Gary Grill"	Virgil Fabian	Anthony Del Broccolo	October 17, 2004	212
Drake and Josh receive an offer to sell Gary Coleman grills from two men they meet at The Premiere. Initially, the boys become wildly successful salesmen and make much money, spending it on a bunch of expensive items for their room. However, the FBI tracks the boys down and informs them that the grills are stolen, believing Drake and Josh to be the thieves and arresting them. Looking to save her brothers, Megan tricks the criminals into admitting that they stole the grills, and Drake and Josh are set free after the FBI discovers the truth. Gary Coleman arrives at the police station to collect the money Drake and Josh got from selling the grills, but since the boys spent all the money, they try and trick him by locking him in a cell. In the end, Gary claims almost all the things Drake and Josh spent with the money, leaving them only with a chair since Josh had already sat in it. Special Guest Star: Gary Coleman as himself. Note: This episode was dedicated to Richard Biggs, who portrayed an FBI agent. He died on May 22, 2004.
19	13	"Drew & Jerry"	Steve Hoefer	George Doty IV	October 24, 2004	213
After Drake tells Josh he needs more time to himself, Josh begins hanging out with Drew (James Immekus), a teenager who looks and acts just like Drake. Drake soon becomes jealous of Drew, so he finds a new friend named Jerry (Stephen Markarian), a teenager who looks and acts just like Josh, to make Josh jealous. Soon, both boys opt to start spending more time with their new friends rather than with each other. Josh abandons his plans to see a movie with Drake in order to see it with Drew instead, while Drake spends the day deep-sea fishing with Jerry, something Josh has always wanted to do. Drake and Josh eventually tire of each other, so they have Drew and Jerry show off their respective talents at The Premiere. Jerry performs a magic trick, while Drew plays his saxophone, with Jerry dancing along to it. This draws the attention of a TV producer, who offers both Drew and Jerry starring roles in a show about two brothers (which ends up eerily similar to Drake and Josh). Drake and Josh eventually reconcile and become friends once again.
20	14	"Honor Council"	Virgil Fabian	Eric Friedman	November 28, 2004	214
Drake is framed for pulling a prank on Mrs. Hayfer when her car is found parked inside her classroom. Although she has no concrete evidence that Drake is the culprit, nonetheless, she suspends him for it. Josh then decides to defend Drake in a trial organized by their school's honor council, in order to prove his brother's innocence. However, Mrs. Hayfer is represented by Josh's archenemy, Mindy Crenshaw (Allison Scagliotti-Smith). Following Mindy's intense interrogation of Drake, he begins to looks guilty through all of her evidence. However, Drake and Josh then receive one more piece of evidence from Megan. They obtain Mindy's permanent record, where it's revealed that the only "B" letter grade Mindy has ever received was in a class taught by Mrs. Hayfer. This forces Mindy to admit to pulling the prank on Mrs. Hayfer in retaliation, and framing Drake in the process. As a result, Mindy is suspended while Drake is exonerated. Mrs. Hayfer then reluctantly apologizes to Drake, but still says that she despises him.

=== Season 3 (2005–2006) ===
No. overall	No. in season	Title	Directed by	Written by	Original release date	Prod. code	U.S. viewers (millions)
21	1	"The Drake & Josh Inn"	Adam Weissman	Jake Farrow	April 2, 2005	305	3.3
Audrey and Walter head to Los Angeles for a Spring Break vacation, leaving Drake and Josh in charge of the house. On top of this, the adults leave them $200 strictly for food and emergencies only. However, Drake immediately decides to spend the money on toys and other unnecessary items. Desperate for more money, Drake wants to temporarily turn their house into a bed and breakfast after he notices a vacationing couple who has no place to stay. Josh is initially hesitant, as he is furious at Drake over his greedy spending, but reluctantly agrees, seeing as they need money for food. Megan also agrees to go along with the ruse, so long as she is also treated like a guest. The situation then quickly deteriorates when Drake invites a crowd of partying college students to stay in the hopes of making even more money. Things worsen when MTV starts broadcasting from inside their house. Audrey and Walter then become suspicious when they see their house on television and begin heading home. However, with the help of Megan, Drake and Josh successfully force everyone to leave and manage to clean up the house before Walter and Audrey arrive. Unfortunately, Audrey and Walter are then mistakenly arrested for their alleged involvement in the party's unauthorized broadcast.
22	2	"Peruvian Puff Pepper"	Steve Hoefer	Steve Holland	April 9, 2005	301	N/A
Josh enters a salsa making contest and asks Drake to help him in order to win the grand prize – a brand-new, flat-screen television set. Megan also wants to help her brothers win the TV in exchange for sharing it between the whole family. However, the boys decline, selfishly wanting to keep the TV all to themselves. Megan then sabotages their salsa in retaliation, causing it to explode all over the kitchen, with the boys taking all the blame from Audrey and Walter. Drake and Josh, sick of always being Megan's victims, then try to find some proof of her deviousness, and discover a surveillance panel inside her room, only for them to get in more trouble when the panel is hidden as they attempt to show their parents. Megan then enters the salsa contest on her own and obtains a "Peruvian Puff Pepper", an extremely rare pepper that could guarantee her victory. Upon learning this, the boys steal the pepper and use it in their salsa instead. Drake and Josh go on to win the contest, but they are soon disqualified when they reveal their secret ingredient at Megan's request, leading to them being informed that Peruvian Puff Peppers are deemed illegal in the United States, due to them causing kidney failure and chapped lips. Megan, declared the winner as the runner-up, is accused by her brothers of setting them up, but she convinces them that she is not that smart enough to do so. In the end, Megan watches the duo repainting the kitchen following the earlier incident as a wrongful punishment from their parents through the television set.
23	3	"We're Married"	Steve Hoefer	George Doty IV	April 16, 2005	302	N/A
Josh's foreign pen pal, Yooka (Anastasia Baranova), comes to visit from her homeland of Yudonia, wherein Drake immediately takes a strong liking to her, spending more time with her than Josh can. Eventually, Drake promises to back off, however he and Josh soon learn that Yooka is homesick. So the boys arrange a Yudonian friendship ceremony in the hopes of lifting her spirits. However, this turns out to actually be a wedding ceremony between Yooka and Drake. Drake tries to carry on with life as normal, however Yooka is serious about being married (revealing that they mistranslated her saying "sick of home", instead of "homesick"), and matters worsen when Yooka's parents come to visit. So Drake and Josh come up with a plan to annul the marriage, serving her family goat, which is a sacred animal in Yudonia. However, Drake quickly regrets the plans after he learns that Yooka's father is a billionaire. The plan works, with Yooka's father ending the marriage and their whole family returning to Yudonia, much to Drake's sorrow. During the end credits, it is revealed that Josh and Yooka are still e-pals and that Yooka's father bought the Boston Red Sox for Yooka's new boyfriend and fiancé Achboo, causing Drake's sorrow to worsen.
24	4	"Mindy's Back"	Adam Weissman	Eric Friedman	April 30, 2005	303	3.0
Mindy Crenshaw returns to school from a mental institution after her long suspension is lifted, following the events of the episode "Honor Council". On top of this, Mindy once again beats Josh in the school's annual science fair. On the advice from Megan, Josh attempts to simply ignore her — until Mindy willingly chooses him as her partner for a science project. Josh is initially annoyed by this, however the two eventually realize they have feelings for one another and begin to date. Despite this, Josh is too worried to tell Drake about their relationship, due to Drake and Mindy's hatred for one another and Drake's resentment towards Mindy for attempting to have him suspended. When Mindy finds out that Josh has not yet told Drake about them, she decides that she cannot be with Josh and the two break up. When Drake finally finds out, he reveals that he is actually happy for Josh and helps to reunite the pair by taking Josh to Mindy's house in the middle of the night, where Josh and Mindy reconcile and finally share their first kiss through Mindy's bedroom window.
25	5	"The Affair"	Adam Weissman	Anthony Del Broccolo	May 21, 2005	304	N/A
Drake and Josh notice that Walter has recently begun to act strangely. After some further eavesdropping, Drake and Josh convince themselves that Walter may be having an affair with another woman. In the hopes of fixing things, the brothers attempt to make Walter fall in love with Audrey all over again by preparing his favorite meal for him, while simultaneously telling Walter that the meal was prepared by Audrey. Unfortunately, this plan backfires after Drake accidentally puts cumin in the food, which Walter is deathly allergic to. This leads to a heated argument between Walter and Audrey, which only makes the situation worse. Later, with the help of Megan, Drake and Josh discover that Walter plans to meet with a woman named Peggy (Allison Dunbar) at a nearby restaurant. After following Walter to the restaurant, Drake and Josh try to convince Peggy to leave their father alone. However, Peggy refuses, so the boys dump food on her in retaliation, causing her to leave in a rage. A furious Walter then reveals that Peggy is actually a producer for the national morning show Good Morning Today, and that she was talking with Walter about potentially being the show's new weatherman. As retribution for costing him the job, Walter forces a guilty Drake and Josh to dump food on themselves as punishment.
26	6	"Playing the Field"	Roger Christiansen	Dan Schneider	June 4, 2005	306	N/A
Drake attempts to break up with Tori (Torrey DeVitto), his latest girlfriend. However, Tori breaks up with Drake first, which seriously confuses Drake (as he is usually the one who ends things when it comes to relationships). When Drake then learns that Tori has already moved on and is dating other guys, Drake attempts to make her jealous by going on a date with another girl, "Hot" Liza Tupper. Meanwhile, Josh grows a mustache, which nobody approves of, including Mindy, who attempts to goad Josh into shaving it off.
27	7	"Helen's Surgery"	Adam Weissman	George Doty IV	June 11, 2005	307	N/A
Drake and Josh are tasked with assisting Helen after eye surgery leaves her temporarily blind. After driving her home, Drake and Josh find that Helen's apartment is filled with luxurious accessories, such as a hot tub and a huge flat-screen TV, due to Helen receiving royalties from a sitcom entitled "Happy Times", that she starred in as a child. When Helen then accidentally takes too much of her pain medication, she becomes severely drowsy and incoherent. To make matters worse, Josh then accidentally loses Helen's eye drops down her sink, forcing him to go to the pharmacy to replace them. When Drake then leaves a loopy Helen alone at her apartment, Josh runs into Drake at their home, chastising Drake for abandoning Helen in her vulnerable state. When the boys return to Helen's apartment, they find that Helen is gone, prompting a frantic search. Eventually, Josh receives a call from Megan, wherein Megan explains that she found Helen at the park and brought her to their home, after which Josh goes to retrieve her. Once Josh and Helen arrive back at Helen's apartment, however, Josh finds that Drake has taken advantage of Helen's blindness and has thrown a huge party at her apartment, much to Josh's disapproval. Helen is then called by her eye doctor informing her to take the patches off her eyes. When she does so, she finds Drake's party currently in progress. However, when Josh goes to throw Drake under the bus and tell Helen everything that happened, Helen instead believes that Drake threw the party specifically for her out of kindness, and she allows it to continue. Meanwhile, Megan pitches an idea to Helen for a bucket-shaped container that conveniently stores most movie theater snacks called "Cup-O-Stuff", whch Josh ridcules her for, believing it is impractical. Once the idea is a success, however, Megan earns $700 to Josh's dismay.
28	8	"Paging Dr. Drake"	Steve Hoefer	Anthony Del Broccolo	October 1, 2005	309	3.1
While working out, Josh drops a barbell on his left foot and seriously injures it after Drake accidentally shoots him with a potato using a launching gun. Despite this, Josh tries to conceal the injury from Walter and Audrey, as he is scared of going to the hospital. When Walter and Audrey find out, however, Josh is forced to go to the hospital, where he is told that his injury will require surgery. At the hospital, Drake attempts to get close to the female nurses by illegally impersonating a doctor, which leads to everyone mistaking Drake for an actual young doctor named Dr. Nussbaum, who is due to arrive to the hospital that day. Drake now has to avoid being caught by Josh's doctor (John O'Hurley) and ends up having to perform a foot surgery, prompting Josh to intervene and bail him out. Eventually, Drake is caught when the real Dr. Nussbaum arrives. In a last act of desperation, Drake jumps out the window, breaking his arm in the process. Meanwhile, Megan plots revenge on her brothers for not letting her turn up the heat, since the house's thermostat is located in the boys' bedroom. As retaliation, Megan then rewires the thermostat, causing the temperature to become so low inside Drake and Josh's room that it begins to actually snow indoors.
29	9	"Foam Finger"	Roger Christiansen	Dan Schneider	October 8, 2005	308	N/A
While reminiscing, Drake and Josh suddenly remember that they previously met eight years prior to becoming stepbrothers during a San Diego Padres game when they were both children, having fought over buying the last foam finger at the stadium. This quickly leads to an argument, wherein Drake and Josh both believe that the other started the fight, and flashback scenes depict different circumstances based on their own memory of the event. Josh believes that Drake intentionally hit him in the back of his head with the foam finger after purchasing it, while Drake vehemently denies this and claims that Josh attacked him first. The two brothers then drift apart after a massive fight, which results in Josh ripping the foam finger apart in a fit of rage. This prompts Drake to move out of their bedroom and into Megan's bedroom. Eventually, Megan locates the clerk who sold the foam finger (Fred Stoller). He explains that it was actually Megan who threw a cookie towards the boys from her stroller, hitting Josh in the back of the head and therefore starting the fight. After learning the truth and reconciling, the episode ends with Drake and Josh imagining how their lives will be at old age.
30	10	"Girl Power"	Steve Hoefer	Jake Farrow	October 15, 2005	311	N/A
Drake plans to break up with his latest girlfriend Lucy (Gabrielle Christian) when he finds out that she is stronger than he is, after Lucy beats up some jocks that were picking on them. However, Drake instead decides to challenge Lucy to a wrestling match to prove that he is tougher than she is. Meanwhile, Josh attempts to impress Mindy's uptight parents, seeking their approval so he can continue to date her. After a dinner at the Crenshaws' house goes horribly wrong, Josh decides to invite the Crenshaws over for a fancy dinner of his own as a last resort – on the same night as Drake and Lucy's fight. Concerned that their fight will ruin his chances of impressing Mindy's parents, Josh forces Drake and Lucy to wrestle upstairs in the boys' bedroom, where Megan is waiting to watch the fight with a group of her friends. However, during the dinner, Drake and Lucy make their way downstairs and into the living room, where Josh furiously yells at Drake for ruining everything. In the midst of all this, Mindy's parents come to realize just how much Josh cares for their daughter, and allow her and Josh to resume their relationship. However, once they find out what Drake and Lucy were fighting over, Mindy's parents argue whether women are stronger than men, and fight it out in front of everyone.
31	11	"Sheep Thrills"	Steve Hoefer	Eric Friedman	October 22, 2005	310	N/A
After investigating a strange noise in their garage, Drake and Josh find that Megan has bought a pet sheep online, which she has named "Baaahhb". Megan then convinces Drake and Josh to help her hide the sheep in their bedroom, while she thinks of a way to explain the situation to Walter and Audrey. In exchange, she promises not to pull any pranks on them for three months. However, when the sheep later gives birth to a lamb on Drake's bed and then wanders out of the room, Drake and Josh must then hide the sheep from their parents while Megan is at oboe practice. However, their secret is discovered when Walter and Audrey bust into their bedroom, demanding an explanation for the boys' strange behavior, to which Drake and Josh attempt to rightly explain that the whole situation is Megan's fault. Of course, Megan then enters and claims to know nothing about the sheep, resulting in Drake and Josh being grounded for a month. On the night before they are lifted from their punishment, the boys discover that Megan has now bought a pet zebra, to which they choose not to have anything to do with it.
32	12	"Megan's New Teacher"	Adam Weissman	George Doty IV	January 28, 2006	313	3.6
After being accepted into "Tomorrow's Teachers Today", a student-teaching program, Josh becomes Megan's new chemistry teacher temporarily. However, Josh takes his new job seriously and soon abuses his teaching skills, as he challenges the students with college-level chemistry (something that they are not old enough to comprehend) and even fails the students on pop quizzes based on homework that they were mentally incapable of doing. Because of this, Megan quickly becomes alienated by her classmates due to being Josh's sister, and is even uninvited to her friend Katie's birthday party, which includes a piñata made in Josh's likeness. Meanwhile, Drake befriends a boy in Megan's class named Neil Kramer, who has a natural talent for playing drums. After discovering this, Drake asks Neil to play for his band on Friday at The Premiere's anniversary party after his original drummer quit. However, Neil's mom forbids him since he failed Josh's pop quiz, leading Drake to also be annoyed at Josh. Drake and Megan then scheme to have Josh fired from the student-teaching program by sneaking into the school late at night, replacing Josh's safe chemical with one that will instantly explode when combined with anything, while also replacing Josh's video about compunds with a video of clowns and unscrewing the sink's faucet so that it will spray water when turned. In the end, Josh is fired and Neil plays with Drake in the concert. However, Megan and her classmates then gift a trophy to Josh, calling him their favorite teacher, seeing as him screwing up his teaching job caused their class's regular teacher, Ms. Hunter (whom they all hated), to quit. The children then admit that Josh is cool, not as a teacher, but as a friend, which Josh delightfully accepts.
33	13	"Little Sibling"	Steve Hoefer	Dan Schneider	February 4, 2006	312	3.6
Mrs. Hayfer attempts to punish Drake for lying to her about being late to class one too many times by sending him to Remedial English, a class filled with unruly and dangerous students. In order to avoid this, Drake agrees to participate in the "Little Sibling Foundation", being matched up with a boy named Sammy. However, Drake immediately drives Sammy away with his lazy and negligent behavior, causing Sammy to befriend Josh instead. Josh and Sammy then proceed to have lots of fun together, such as filming a pretend cooking show where, while recording, Josh tells Sammy how most people who know Drake and Josh normally see Drake as the cool one of the two, and that it's nice to have things the other way around. A desperate Drake then makes one last attempt to interest Sammy in order to avoid his punishment, bribing Sammy with a four-wheeler and tickets to a magic show. Although he succeeds, Drake soon regrets his decision after seeing how depressed Josh is over losing Sammy. Drake's regret then worsens after he watches the recording of Josh and Sammy's cooking show and hears Josh's confession to Sammy, in the process realizing what Sammy truly means to Josh. The next day, Drake then tells Sammy that he is not feeling well, allowing Sammy and Josh to attend the magic show instead. However, Josh then overhears Drake talking to Megan, wherein Drake confesses that he feigned the illness so that Josh and Sammy could spend time together. As a result of being unsuccessful with Sammy, Drake is then sent to Remedial English, however Josh enters and rescues his brother as a sign of gratitude for letting Sammy spend time with him.
34	14	"Theater Thug"	Roger Christiansen	Dan Schneider	February 18, 2006	314	N/A
Josh lands the role of a notorious robber known as the "Theater Thug" for a crime drama television series entitled "FBI's Most Wanted", with the re-enactment segment being filmed at The Premiere. However, after the episode airs, Josh is then mistaken by the entirety of San Diego for the actual thief, causing him to be repeatedly beaten up and arrested. Drake, on the other hand, receives endless praise from people, despite only having a three-second appearance and uttering only one line. Eventually, one night at The Premiere during closing, the real Theater Thug comes in and attempts a robbery. Drake and Josh manage to subdue him, but when the police arrive, they once again mistake Josh for the robber and arrest him instead, allowing the real Theater Thug to escape. Special guest star: Josh Server as Jeff Carlson, the crime show's director.
35	15	"The Demonator"	Steve Hoefer	Anthony Del Broccolo & Eric Friedman	February 25, 2006	315	N/A
Drake and Josh plan to ride a new roller coaster called "The Demonator" on its opening day. However, they instead find out that the ride will actually open that night. Complicating things further, the boys are then tasked by Audrey and Walter to stay home and watch over their great-grandfather, Papa Nichols, who recently had surgery, while Walter and Audrey attend an awards show. As a way out, Drake calls two friends from school, Craig Ramirez and Eric Blonowitz, to come over and convinces them to watch Papa Nichols while he, Josh, and Megan – who has blackmailed Drake and Josh into taking her – go off to ride the Demonator. Sometime later, Papa Nichols wakes up disoriented, believing that he is back in World War II and that Craig and Eric are German soldiers, in which he proceeds to attack them and evens breaks Eric's cell phone when he believes it to be a weapon. Meanwhile, while waiting to ride the Demonator, Drake, Josh and Megan are bumped to the back of the line after Josh attempts to reclaim his spot in line after using the restroom, upsetting the other parkgoers. Later, Drake and Josh are bumped back in line once again after Josh is falsely accused of messing with the amusement park's mascot, wherein Megan takes the opportunity to remain in line by pretending not to know them. After Megan rides the Demonator first, Drake and Josh finally get to ride the Demonator and arrive home just seconds before Audrey and Walter do. Suddenly, Papa Nichols wakes up and punches Walter, knocking him out and calling him a German.
36	16	"Alien Invasion"	Will Bardelli	Steve Holland	March 18, 2006	316	3.5
Megan, who was just gifted a brand new telescope, uses Josh's laptop and Drake's leather jacket without their permission. When Drake and Josh attempt to take their things back from Megan, she gets them sent to their room after convincing Walter that both of them bullied her and pushed her down. Enraged, the boys then hatch a plan to pull their own prank on Megan. Using photoshop, they insert a false image of an alien spaceship onto the laptop screen. Megan falls for the ruse and believes that aliens are invading. Drake and Josh then have Eric rewire their kitchen so that they can control the appliances inside, which frightens Megan and convinces her even further that aliens are real. Drake and Josh continue to try to prove to Megan that aliens are invading and, when Megan is left home alone one night, they pose as aliens and have their comeuppance on her. Just as Drake and Josh begin celebrating, though, a seemingly actual alien shows up that turns out to be a friend of Megan's and scares the duo away, much to Megan's delight. Leaving her brothers to their own fear as her retribution against them, Megan and her friend then hang out together in the house as her parents return, with the "alien" scaring Walter upon meeting him.
37	17	"Dr. Phyllis Show"	Steve Hoefer	Anthony Del Broccolo & Eric Friedman	April 8, 2006	317	2.9
Drake and Josh have been constantly arguing more than usual, including late at night. Fed up with being awoken due to their bickering, Megan books her brothers as guests on the Dr. Phyllis Show (a parody of Dr. Phil), hoping that its eponymous hostess (Gabrielle Carteris) can end their feud once and for all. On the show, Dr. Phyllis has the boys reminisce about fights they have had in the past. When Josh mentions that Drake once dated a girl named "Hot" Liza Tupper to make his ex-girlfriend Tori jealous (from the episode "Playing the Field") as an example of how Drake takes advantage of everyone, Drake confirms that the story is true and insults Liza by calling her "dumb" and "a bad kisser". Liza Tupper, however, happens to be Dr. Phyllis's daughter, sending Dr. Phyllis in such a rage that she physically attacks Drake on air, and even attacks Josh when he tries to stop her. Once they return home, the brothers realize that they were only recalling the bad memories they have had together, even though they have had plenty of good memories as well. Drake and Josh then reconcile after reminiscing on the good times they have had, but soon end up in another heated argument as a result of a small beverage mix-up. Upon hearing this, Megan furiously sets off an incapacitating agent-laden smoke bomb to render her brothers unconscious and finally have some peace and quiet.

=== Season 4 (2006–2007) ===
No. overall	No. in season	Title	Directed by	Written by	Original release date	Prod. code	U.S. viewers (millions)
38	1	"Josh Runs Into Oprah"	Roger Christiansen	Ethan Banville	September 24, 2006	405	2.8
It's Josh's 17th birthday, however Drake forgets and instead plans a surprise birthday party for his latest girlfriend Tabitha (Summer Bishil). After being confronted by an enraged Josh and realizing his mistake, Drake acquires tickets for he and Josh to see Oprah Winfrey, Josh's idol, as well backstage passes to her show, as she is currently filiming a series of shows in San Diego. However, on the day of the show, when Josh exaggerates about parking a short distance away from the venue and insists on parking closer to the entrance in order to prevent sweating, the brothers get into an argument and begin fighting over the steering wheel, causing Josh to accidentally run over Oprah. An emotionally distraught Josh is then beaten up by a group of women when they overhear that he was the culprit. Later, when Drake and Josh go to the hospital in an attempt to apologize to Oprah, they are unable to get past security, getting tased in the process. Drake then tricks the security guards, and the whole hospital, into believing Josh has a flesh-eating virus, which, in return, leads to Josh being chemically bathed. In the end, Drake makes everything up to Josh by throwing him a real surprise birthday party at The Premiere, gifting him a signed restraining order from Oprah and a new motor scooter as his presents. Meanwhile, Megan struggles to care for a virtual pet that belongs to her friend Janie, as its constant need for attention prevents Megan from having any time for herself.
39	2	"Vicious Tiberius"	Roger Christiansen	George Doty IV	October 1, 2006	402	N/A
Mrs. Hayfer is going on vacation for the weekend, to which Josh volunteers to watch over her dog and house while she is away, dragging Drake along with him. Meanwhile, Walter buys an elliptical machine and begins working out to finally beat his arch-nemesis, Bruce Winchill, in their television station's annual 5k run. Drake and Josh arrive at Mrs. Hayfer's house where they soon meet her dog, Tiberius, who is a vicious Rottweiler that quickly traps the boys inside Mrs. Hayfer's bathroom. Later, when Megan returns home from oboe practice and stops by Mrs. Hayfer's house to look for her brothers, Drake and Josh notice that Tiberius happens to be calm whenever Megan is around, suggesting that he specifically does not like men. An animal control officer (Buddy Lewis) then arrives and is about to capture Tiberius, until the dog traps him in the bathroom as well. Drake and Josh then devise a successful plan to escape from Mrs. Hayfer's house without being mauled by Tiberius, using raw meat from her kitchen as a distraction. At the end of the episode, after Drake and Josh arrive home, Walter goes to Mrs. Hayfer's house seeking Drake and Josh, but unfortunately finds Tiberius. A frightened Walter then flees Mrs. Hayfer's house, with Tiberius chasing after him while Drake and Josh relax at home, blissfully unaware of what's happening.
40	3	"The Wedding"	Steve Hoefer	Matt Fleckenstein	October 15, 2006	412	N/A
Drake and Josh are tasked with delivering a wedding cake to their 89-year-old Great Aunt Catherine's wedding on time, in the hopes that the family will inherit her luxurious beach house when she dies. Unfortunately, Drake gives Josh's laptop case to Craig and Eric, which not only contains Josh's laptop, but also Josh's cell phone and the keys to Audrey's car, leaving the boys with no ride to the wedding and unable to contact Craig and Eric, since neither of them have cell phones (Eric's was broken by Papa Nichols in the episode, "The Demonator", and Craig's mother believes cell phones cause ear sores). Seemingly out of options, Drake and Josh decide to use their friend Trevor's old car, a 1970s Chevrolet El Camino, in a last attempt to arrive at the wedding with the cake on time. However, the car soon breaks down and leaves the boys stranded on the side of a road with no means to call for help, as it's revealed that Drake ruined his own cell phone after submerging it in a bowl of soup, hoping that it would float. Sometime later, when the boys leave the vehicle unattended to go relieve themselves, two police officers (Kevin Farley, Jesse Burch) issue them a parking ticket. Later, when Drake and Josh seek help from two strangers passing through, the strangers mug them instead. Eventually, a tow truck driver named Leslie (E.E. Bell) arrives and offers to help. However, Drake ridicules his name, so he angrily abandons the boys out of spite. In the end, Drake and Josh seemingly fix the El Camino, however it immediately catches on fire along with the wedding cake, at which point the brothers simply give up and walk away.
41	4	"Mindy Loves Josh"	Adam Weissman	Arthur Gradstein	October 22, 2006	403	2.9
One night at the Parker-Nichols' home, Josh and Mindy are working on their science fair project. However, after the two slightly butt heads over the project, they mutually agree to each build their own project instead. When Mindy goes to leave for the night, she takes the opportunity to tell Josh for the first time that she loves him. Flustered, this causes Josh to panic and unintentionally slam the door in her face. Josh immediately runs upstairs and seeks advice from Drake, who also freaks out and advises Josh to break up with Mindy as soon as possible. However, Josh still remains conflicted. The next day at school, Josh apologizes to Mindy for freaking out, and admits that he is not sure if he loves her back. Mindy also apologizes for putting Josh on the spot and agrees to give Josh some time to think about his feelings, and they seemingly reconcile. However, Drake then convinces Josh that Mindy may have only lied about being in love with him as a way to distract Josh from beating her in the school's annual science fair. On the day of the science fair, Josh actually defeats Mindy for the first time ever and wins first prize, after which Josh confronts Mindy about her supposed lie. An angry Mindy then reveals to Josh that she let him win out of sympathy. Now overcome with guilt, Josh apologizes and gifts his first prize ribbon to Mindy. Josh then admits that the whole reason he freaked out in the first place is because Mindy is the first girl he has truly dated. Because of this, Josh admits that he is not entirely sure what true love feels like. Mindy also admits to being equally as inexperienced with relationships and unsure of her feelings towards Josh as well, so the couple then decide to break up until both of them know what they really want, however they choose to remain good friends. Meanwhile, Megan exacts revenge on Drake after he eats her cookie. She learns about a rare skin disease called "Derma Temeculitis", that turns the hands and feet of those infected by it a sickly greenish color, so Megan secretly dyes Drake's hands and feet green while he is asleep in order to fool him into believing he has the disease, eventually forcing Drake to suffer through a disgusting cure involving lizard urine. However, while Drake is in the middle of "curing" himself, Megan gloatingly reveals her deception.
42	5	"Who's Got Game?"	Adam Weissman	Ethan Banville	November 5, 2006	409	3.3
After a debate, Drake and Josh make a bet to see who can score more dates within the span of a week. The bet seems to go smoothly until Drake meets and falls in love with a girl named Carly (Brittany Curran), an employee at the local record store. Because of this, Drake tries to call off the bet, however Josh refuses, as he is currently on a roll with scoring dates, thanks to Audrey's help. However, when Carly overhears Drake arguing with Josh about the bet, she becomes angry and breaks up with him. Drake then tries to be genuinely honest in order to win Carly back, but fails several times. Eventually after another failed apology attempt with Craig and Eric, Drake gathers everyone who he has wronged in the past and, in front of Carly, admits to and apologizes for all the dishonest things he did to each of them. Moved by his honesty, Carly and Drake get back together, while Josh officially wins the bet. As part of the bet, Josh switches beds with Drake. However, during that night, the boys decide to immediately switch back after Josh accidentally falls off of Drake's high-risen platform.
43	6	"The Great Doheny"	Adam Weissman	Matt Fleckenstein	November 12, 2006	404	3.42
Josh's favorite magician, Henry Doheny (Steve Tom), stops by The Premiere and becomes acquainted with Drake and Josh, however the boys quickly find Doheny and his constant magic tricks irritating. When Doheny then admits to Josh that his popularity has severely dwindled and that nobody wants him around anymore, a sympathetic Josh invites Doheny to come stay with them for two months, which angers Drake even further. Eventually, Drake and Josh decide to help Doheny become famous again by organizing a show for him at The Premiere. During the show, Doheny has swords shoved into him in a box by the brothers. But when Drake and Josh check on Doheny after he does not appear out of the box unharmed on cue, Doheny is pronounced dead at the scene. At his funeral, Doheny suddenly reveals himself to be alive, explaining that faking his death – which had been suggested to him by Megan – was the actual trick. As a result, Doheny secures a five-year deal in Las Vegas and leaves San Diego to perform there. As a parting gift, Drake and Josh are gifted yo-yos, while Megan receives a $50,000 check for her idea. During the end credits, Walter asks Doheny to give him his hair back, after Doheny had performed a trick on Walter earlier, which resulted in him becoming bald. However, Doheny leaves straight for Las Vegas and mockingly tells Walter to buy a wig.
44	7	"I Love Sushi"	Steve Hoefer	Dan Schneider	November 26, 2006	407	3.2
As an anniversary gift for Audrey and Walter, Drake and Josh plan to have their house's living room redecorated by a new television series entitled Pump My Room. However, after Drake and Josh leave the house so that the living room can be redecorated, the boys return later that evening to find that they have been scammed, discovering that the show's "producers" have stolen all of their furniture instead. To make matters worse, the police officers summoned to the house are uninterested in helping the family, due to one of the officers being unimpressed about how easily Drake and Josh fell for the scam in the first place, and the other officer having suffered from one of Walter's poor weather predictions. Drake and Josh then attempt to earn enough money to replace the stolen furniture by working part-time jobs at a sushi-packaging line inside a fish factory. However, the job quickly proves to be a disaster, due to the factory's demanding head-chef and the ever-increasing speed of the line's conveyor belt. Returning home from their failure, the brothers discover that all of their furniture is now back where it belongs, thanks to the police having located the faulty moving van used in the scammers' heist, which was abandoned after breaking down about a half-mile down the street from their house. Meanwhile, Megan finds that she has become too busy to prank Drake and Josh on a regualr basis, so she hires a young boy named Tyler to fill in for her. Note: With the episode's title being a pun on the series, I Love Lucy, the scene at the fish factory from this episode is a direct homage to one of that series' most famous episodes, entitled Job Switching. In addition, the name of the factory is "Ball & Vance Fish Corporation", a direct reference to I Love Lucy's principle actresses, Lucille Ball and Vivian Vance. The episode's end credits are also stylized after the ones from said series.
45	8	"The Storm"	Steve Hoefer	George Doty IV	January 7, 2007	411	3.11
Due to Walter's poor weather forecasts, Drake's long-awaited hopes of opening up for The Sparks are crushed when a fierce storm approaches, trapping him, as well as his friends and family, inside the Parker-Nichols household. To make matters worse for Drake, he desperately attempts to keep his current girlfriend, Carly, from meeting his ex-girlfriends, Lucy and Christine. When the girls eventually do meet, Drake suddenly becomes paranoid about the situation and demands to know if they are talking about him. Meanwhile, Craig is forced to consistently crank an old television set for Crazy Steve, so that he can watch Dora the Explorer, while Walter is forced to conduct a live weather broadcast outside during the storm. Note: Josh only appears in the episode's cold open.
46	9	"My Dinner with Bobo"	Virgil Fabian	Arthur Gradstein	January 14, 2007	406	3.18
When Drake and Josh pool their money together in order to buy a car, they find themselves unable to agree on one they both like. Eventually though, Drake takes the money and uses it to buy an orangutan named Bobo from the dealership's owner (Steve Kramer). Drake then explains to an enraged Josh that they can use Bobo as an attraction in order to make enough money to buy cars for each of them. The boys eventually sell Bobo for $10,000 to a doctor named Adrian Favershim, whom they meet at The Premiere. Feeling suspicious, Megan performs a background check on Dr. Favershim and discovers that he cannibalizes orangutans and related species. Drake and Josh then go to Dr. Favershim's apartment to return the money and take Bobo back. Unfortunately, things do not go as planned, as Favershim traps the brothers in his closet and confiscates Josh’s cell phone. Thankfully, Megan alerts the police, who quickly arrest Favershim. Megan also agrees to free Drake and Josh, so long as they give Bobo back to the car dealer and buy the car she wants – a yellow Beetle with hot pink flowers painted on it. Though reluctant, the boys buy the car, which results in them being teased by their friends, much to Megan's amusement.
47	10	"Tree House"	Roger Christiansen	Dan Schneider	January 21, 2007	408	3.51
After a model rocket shoots off from inside their bedroom and explodes in their next-door neighbors' tree house, Drake, Josh and Megan are forced to rebuild it the next day. To make matters worse, Drake and Josh have a double date scheduled with twin sisters, while Megan has plans to attend her friend Janie's birthday party. While Drake and Josh are inside constructing the tree house, Drake forgets to cut the doorway out before Josh attaches the last wall, thus trapping the duo inside. Despite their desperate cries for help, Megan refuses to let her brothers out, as revenge for making her miss Janie's party, forcing Drake and Josh to miss their double date; Megan later sets Craig and Eric up on the date instead. Eventually, Drake and Josh free themselves from the tree house by running into the wall with such force that it knocks them out of the tree and to the ground.
48	11	"Josh Is Done"	Adam Weissman	Ethan Banville	February 11, 2007	415	3.5
When Drake's antics finally go too far and cause Josh to miss an important chemistry exam, Josh decides that he is officially done with Drake, considering him as nothing more than a roommate. Without Drake, Josh's life begins to drastically improve, such as passing his make-up exam, which results in him maintaining his good grade average; getting along better with Helen at work; and even becoming more popular amongst his classmates. Drake's life, on the other hand, begins to severely fall apart, as Josh is not there to help guide him. Aftet Drake completely breaks down in the middle of chemistry class following a chemical incident involving a new lab partner, the brothers finally realize just how important their relationship with one another truly is. The episode then ends with Drake and Josh reconciling over a game of table tennis.
49	12	"Eric Punches Drake"	Roger Christiansen	Arthur Gradstein	February 18, 2007	417	3.30
One day at school, Eric accidentally punches Drake in the eye while demonstrating a kung-fu move to Craig. Although he brushes it off as an unfortunate accident, Drake suddenly becomes enraged when he finds out that Eric has started spreading a rumor around school that he hit Drake on purpose for making fun of his sister, causing Eric to become instantly popular and ruining Drake's reputation by reducing him to a laughingstock. Fed up by Eric’s popularity at his expense, Drake, with the help of Craig (who has been ditched by Eric), attempts to reveal the truth about Eric's accidental punch. Their plan is successful, and Eric tries to show off the actual punch but accidentally hits a girl instead, causing him to be further embarrassed and resulting in Drake taking the girl out. In the end, Drake, Craig and Eric sing behind a dumpster, thus reconciling their friendship. Meanwhile, Josh is overcome with jealousy when he believes Mindy has a new boyfriend named Chad, who is actually revealed to be her cousin.
50	13	"Megan's Revenge"	Steve Hoefer	Dan Schneider	March 4, 2007	401	3.19
When Drake and Josh borrow Megan's camera to photograph a supermodel who has stopped by their house looking for directions, Josh decides to take a photo of Megan's pet hamster, Hervay. Hervay then suddenly falls over unconscious, leading the boys to believe that they have killed him. Despite Megan assuring Drake and Josh that she is not mad at them, knowing it was an accident, the boys still fear retaliation from her, which soon evolves into extreme paranoia as the days go by. However, Megan soon tells her brothers that she knew how scared they were and that her "revenge" was simply watching Drake and Josh become overwhelmed with fear. Shortly after the truth is revealed, Megan presses a button on a device, which blows up the spot on Drake and Josh's bedroom floor where they are standing, causing them to fall into the garage below, where Megan then reveals to Drake and Josh that Hervay is not dead, but was just stunned by the camera's flash.
51	14	"Steered Straight"	Steve Hoefer	Dan Schneider	March 11, 2007	414	3.04
Drake obtains fake IDs for himself and Josh, so they can enter an adults-only nightclub to see Josh's favorite band, the Hailstones. The boys are then caught by the police, but are not placed under arrest. Instead of grounding their sons, Audrey and Walter choose to sign Drake and Josh up for the police department's "Steered Straight" program, in which juveniles are shown what it is like to be arrested. However, the plan eventually backfires when the officer who is driving the brothers to the police station is suddenly confronted by an actual hardened criminal named Blaze, who carjacks him. Using their fake ID names of Alvin Yakatori and Jefferson Steelflex, Drake and Josh pose as hardened criminals so that they can befriend Blaze. The boys then convince Blaze to take them back to their house, under the pretense that it is actually someone else's house that they plan to rob. At the house, while the rest of their family are away, Drake and Josh attempt to contact the police. When Blaze catches them in the act, the boys lie about contacting their fellow criminals in a plot to kidnap the governor of California, however this only prompts Blaze to call in his own crew for the plot instead. When Walter comes home early, the boys quickly trap him in a closet to maintain their ruse. The brothers then fake a physical altercation with each other, with the use of Josh's magic kit. Terrified and disgusted, the criminals then flee the house. In the aftermath, Drake, Josh, Audrey and Megan all go out for dinner, wherein the boys realize that they accidentally forgot to free Walter.
52	15	"Megan's First Kiss"	Will Bardelli	George Doty IV	April 7, 2007	418	4.6
Megan's secretive behavior leads Drake and Josh to believe she is up to something. After spying on her at The Premiere, disguised as Jewish Irishmen, it's revealed that Megan has a new boyfriend named Corey, whom she has been dating for the past seven weeks. However, once Drake and Josh are found out, they quickly become overprotective of their sister and embarrass her, causing Corey to end the relationship. After a stern lecture from Walter about Megan becoming a young adult, Drake and Josh agree to back off and apologize to Corey so that he will go out with Megan again, which Corey agrees to. However, when Josh goes to The Premiere the next day to pick up his paycheck, he spots Corey with another girl named Monica (whom he has been supposedly dating for a month). Josh then informs Drake of the situation, and the brothers decide to break the news to Megan, which she refuses to believe. During her next date, Drake and Josh arrive and expose Corey by bringing Monica along with them. Megan and Monica then both break up with Corey after learning the truth. Drake and Josh then attempt to brutally punish Corey for his deceit, only for them to be severely beaten up by Corey instead. In the end, however, Megan apologizes to her brothers for not believing them at first, and tells them she loves them.
53	16	"Battle of Panthatar"	Josh Peck	Matt Fleckenstein	April 15, 2007	416	3.9
Drake and Josh are invited to their friend Thornton's 16th birthday party at Club Diego, which will air on MTV live. However, their invitations are soon revoked after Thornton catches Drake kissing a girl named Maria, who – unbeknownst to Drake – is Thornton's girlfriend. In order to rectify this, Josh forces Drake into gifting Thornton his autographed Abbey Road album, which Drake himself had just received as a gift. Although Thornton gladly accepts the present, he still refuses to invite Drake and Josh to the party. As a result, Drake and Josh decide to retaliate by crashing and ruining Thorton's party, posing as Red Skynauts from the Galaxy Wars franchise, while also attempting to steal Drake's album back. When they are discovered, the boys still manage to escape with Drake successfully swiping the album back.
54	17	"Really Big Shrimp"	Drake Bell (Part 1); Steve Hoefer (Part 2)	Dan Schneider & George Doty IV	August 3, 2007	419–420	5.8
Drake achieves his lifelong dream and lands a record deal with a label named Spin City Records, with Josh serving as his manager. The record company then makes a deal with the brothers, wherein Drake's new song will be played during a major commercial for a shoe company that is scheduled to air during the Super Bowl. However, due to being distracted by the record company's served prawns, Josh forgets to thoroughly read through the contract before signing it, unknowingly turning over all creative rights to Drake's song to the record company. Because of this, the record label completely remixes Drake's song to the point where it becomes unrecognizable, much to Drake's disappointment and anger. This ultimately causes a major rift between the brothers, prompting Josh to rectify his mistake by any means necessary. Meanwhile, Mindy and Josh consider getting back together, while Helen makes a deal with Craig and Eric to videotape her wedding with her fiancé, Buzz. With Helen's wedding quickly approaching, the Parker-Nichols family must also cope with the fact that Helen's grandmother is staying at their house. Note: This episode was written as, and intended to be, the series finale. However, this episode would air before "Helicopter" and "Dance Contest", due to Nickelodeon broadcasting the episodes out of production order.
55	18	"Helicopter"	Virgil Fabian	Dan Schneider	August 5, 2007	410	4.2
After Drake wins a chance to skydive out of a helicopter, Audrey and Walter, believing it to be too dangerous, completely forbid Drake from doing so. Of course, Drake disobeys his parents and goes skydiving anyway. Josh also tries to stop Drake in the process, which ultimately leads to both brothers boarding the helicopter. Unfortunately, the brothers lose their pilot, Vince, after Josh accidentally blasts him out of the helicopter with a fire extinguisher. To make matters worse, the boys then lose the radio after Drake accidentally stretches the cord out too far. The helicopter eventually runs out of fuel, forcing Drake and Josh to jump out of it with only one parachute for safety. The brothers then miraculously return home just as Audrey and Walter arrive, thinking they are in the clear. However, Vince then arrives at the house and angrily tells Walter and Audrey that they now owe him $400,000 for the damaged helicopter. Immediately knowing the consequences, Drake and Josh then voluntarily ground themselves for two weeks.
56	19	"Dance Contest"	Steve Hoefer	George Doty IV	September 16, 2007	413	4.2
With the end of the school year approaching and their senior year only three months away, Josh decides to enter a dance contest so that he can secure the spot as the top student of his class, while Drake is threatened to either compete in the dance competition or repeat his junior year. Drake then steals Josh's original dance partner for the contest, so Josh retaliates by hiring a short-tempered Eastern European dance partner. However, moments before they are due to take the stage, Drake and Josh's partners have a fight and are both disqualified. Backed into a corner, Drake and Josh then decide to dance together in the contest and, after an impressive routine, end up winning the contest. While they are being awarded, a random girl (first appearing in the episode "Blues Brothers") runs onstage and kisses both of them, telling the boys that she loves them. Drake and Josh then become confused about the girl as the episode ends.

== Films ==
Title	Directed by	Written by	Original release date	U.S. viewers (millions)
Drake & Josh Go Hollywood	Steve Hoefer	Story by : Dan Schneider & Steven Molaro; Teleplay by : Dan Schneider	January 6, 2006	5.4
Josh decides that he needs a great adventure in his life, so Drake promotes him as his band's new manager after Drake fires his old manager for canceling three gigs in a month and having Drake perform at an old folk's home. Meanwhile, Audrey and Walter leave to go on a 10-day cruise vacation, while Megan makes plans to go to Denver, Colorado to visit her friend Jessica. After being tasked with taking Megan to the airport by their parents and seeing her off, Drake and Josh mistakenly send Megan on Flight 647 to Los Angeles when she was supposed to board Flight 746. Panicked, the brothers follow Megan on the next flight out in order to bring her home. On the plane, Josh's G-O is accidentally switched with someone else's. The boys soon learn that the G-O Josh has acquired is actually an electronic key for a U.S. Treasury currency production machine, which was reported stolen three days earlier. While in Hollywood, Josh is noticed by a local producer who arranges for Drake to perform on TV at Sunset Studios. However, the owners of the stolen G-O then kidnap Drake and Josh. Megan then finds the kidnapper's wallet and tracks Drake and Josh down. Once she discovers their location, Megan calls the police on the kidnappers. The police arrive to free Drake and Josh and explain that the kidnapper's leader, Milo McRarie, is currently on the FBI's Most Wanted List. After Milo is successfully arrested, Megan then leaves to catch her flight to Denver. Drake and Josh then drive back to Hollywood to Sunset Studios, where Drake performs his new song, "Hollywood Girl". After Drake's performance, the producer pulls some strings, and lands Drake an audition for Spin City Records. Two girls then approach to Drake to compliment him and ask if they can hang out with he and Josh, which they accept.
Merry Christmas, Drake & Josh	Michael Grossman	Dan Schneider & Steven Molaro	December 5, 2008	8.1
Drake decides to throw a Christmas party on the roof of The Premiere. But when a group of teens trash the place, Josh is mistaken for one of the teens and is subsequently arrested. Later that night, Drake breaks into prison attempting to free Josh, after he promises to provide a little girl named Mary Alice and her foster family the "best Christmas ever". However, Drake's plan fails and both brothers end up behind bars, and are even threatened with a life sentence in prison for multiple crimes. However, their luck turns around when Drake hires Helen to represent them in their case, on the grounds that Helen has never once lost an argument. During the court case, the judge agrees to release Drake and Josh from prison, provided that they stick to their promise of giving Mary Alice and her foster-family the "best Christmas ever". Meanwhile, Drake and Josh's parole officer, Perry Gilbert, does all he can to prevent Drake and Josh from keeping their promise, including tricking "Crazy" Steve into telling the foster-family about everything, causing them to feel betrayed. Desperate for help, Drake and Josh turn to Gilbert's mother, who provides them with enough information to stop his evil ways. In the end, everyone celebrates a merry Christmas, which sees "Crazy" Steve make snow by shredding cheese in a woodchipper and Drake and Josh doing a nice thing for Gilbert that changes his Christmas spirit. Note: This TV film was made apart from the regular series, and serves as somewhat of an epilogue for the series, wrapping up all remaining storylines.
