= Nick von Esmarch =

American actor

Nick von Esmarch (born November 2, 1976) is a former American actor. Born in San Mateo, California, he played high school football and did a small bit of amateur acting before being convinced by a friend to audition for the part of Dwight White for the TV series Nikki. He has since gone on to play parts in shows such as Crossing Jordan, Without A Trace and Drake & Josh.

== Filmography ==
- Beer Money (TV) - David 'Rutt' Rutledge (2001)
- Nikki - Dwight White (2000-2002)
- Off Centre - Slab (2002)
- Happy Family - Dr. Fishman (2004)
- Crossing Jordan - Dan Meeks (2004)
- My Wife and Kids - Bob Slobodonopopovich (2004)
- JAG - Capt. Dale Alexander (2005)
- Little Athens - Juicehead Dave (2005)
- Drake and Josh Go To Hollywood (TV) - Brice Granger (2006)
- The Game - Ty Savage (2007)
- Without A Trace - Steven O'Malley (2009)
- The Mentalist - Thaddeus Delahay (2014)
