= Jonathan Goldstein (actor) =

American actor

- Education: New York University (BFA)
- Occupation: Actor
- Years active: 1989–present

Jonathan Goldstein is an American actor who is best known for his role as Josh’s father, Walter Nichols, in the Nickelodeon sitcom Drake & Josh that aired from 2004–2007. He is from Manhattan.

== Career ==
Some of his other television credits include The Riches, Buffy the Vampire Slayer, NCIS, Heroes, Grey's Anatomy, Once and Again and The Electric Company. He also directed two episodes of the Nickelodeon sitcom iCarly starring his former Drake & Josh co-star Miranda Cosgrove.

Goldstein was also a founding member of Los Angeles's Sacred Fools Theater Company and served as one of its Artistic Directors during the theater's inaugural season.

In recent years, Goldstein has taken to traveling to Bowling Green, Kentucky during the summer to direct amateur youth theater. So far, he has directed local productions of Romeo and Juliet, Pride and Prejudice, and The Crucible.

== Filmography ==
=== Film ===
Year	Film	Role	Notes
1989	They Jitters	Joey	Debut
1993	Stranger		
1996	Body of Influence 2	Rick Benson	
1998	Shock Television	Donut Shop Owner	
1999	The Auteur Theory	Santa Claus	
2004	Tube	Eric	Short film
2004	The Guru Singh-Cinderelli	Max	Short video
2005	Herstory	Mark	
2009	Table Manners	Mrs. Hayward	Short film
2010	No Heart Feelings	Joe (voice)	
2012	Unorthodox	Morty	Short film
2014	Teacher of the Year	John Collier	
2019	Flashout	Repairman	

=== Television ===
Year	Film	Role	Notes
1994	Target of Suspicion	Bartender	Television movie
1997	Maître Da Costa	Le doigt de Dieu	
1999	Wasteland	Cigarette Guy	
2000–2001	Once and Again	Fosdick	
2001	Buffy the Vampire Slayer	Mike	Episode: "Life Serial"
2002	Without a Trace	Bartender	
2003	The Handler	Paramedic	
2004–2007	Drake & Josh	Walter Nichols	56 episodes
2004	Half & Half	Photographer	
2005	The West Wing	Knocking Congressman	
2006	Drake & Josh Go Hollywood	Walter Nichols	Television movie
2007	The Wedding Bells	Bar Guy	
2007–2008	The Riches	Wes	
2008	The Starter Wife	Bill	
2008	Californication	Mario	
2008	Merry Christmas, Drake & Josh	Walter Nichols	Television movie
2009	Eleventh Hour	Charlie Wease	
2009	Meteor	Walt Payne	Mini-series
2009	Party Down	Douglas	
2009	Heroes	Male Citizen	
2009	Private Practice	Rabbi	
2009	Parks and Recreation	Donnie Rotger	Episode: "Christmas Scandal"
2010	Grey's Anatomy	Ken May	
2010	Criminal Minds	Detective John Fordham	
2010	The Defenders	Luke Purcell	
2011	NCIS	Glenn Block	
2011	Svetlana		Episode # 2.12
2012	Workaholics	Father	
2016	Fear the Walking Dead	Alan	Episode: "Ouroboros"
2018	Lucifer	Jonathan Burke	Episode: "Boo Normal"
2019	Magnum P.I.	Roland McDowell	Episode: "Black is the Widow"
2019	Adaptation	Larry	Filming
2020	Danger Force	Santa Claus	Episodes: "Santa Goes Down" Pt. 1 and 2
2020	The Magicians	Emperor of the Etheric Realm	Episode: “Magicians Anonymous”

=== Video games ===
Year	Title	Role	Notes
2008	CSI: NY	Steven Benson	
2010	BioShock 2	Additional Voices	Minerva's Den DLC
