= Dense (film) =

- Written by: Vanessa Estelle Williams; Shari Poindexter
- Directed by: Vanessa Estelle Williams
- Starring: Lanei Chapman; Michael Ralph; Yolonda Ross; Vondie Curtis-Hall
- Theme music composer: Michael Bearden
- Country of origin: United States
- Original language: English

Production
- Producers: Vanessa Estelle Williams; Andre Wiseman; Carol Ann Shine
- Cinematography: John L. Demps Jr.
- Editor: Debra I. Moore
- Running time: 35 minutes

Original release
- Network: Showtime
- Release: April 21, 2004

Dense is a 2004 American television short film directed and written by Vanessa Williams and Shari Poindexter, and aired on the TV channel Showtime.

== Plot ==
A man gives his girlfriend an ultimatum: to drop her career to start a family or he will leave her. She begins to question the relationship realizing maybe she was dense.

== Cast ==
- Lanei Chapman as Yvette
- Michael Ralph as Julius
- Yolonda Ross as Stacey
- Vondie Curtis-Hall as Ross

== Festival screenings ==
- Martha's Vineyard African American Film Festival, "Some of the entertainers who have presented material at the annual festival include Vanessa A. Williams directorial debut of Dense..."
