= Drake & Josh Go Hollywood =

2006 television film based on Drake & Josh directed by Steve Hoefer

- DVD cover
- Genre: Adventure; Comedy
- Based on: Drake & Josh by Dan Schneider
- Screenplay by: Dan Schneider
- Story by: Dan Schneider; Steven Molaro
- Directed by: Steve Hoefer
- Starring: Drake Bell; Josh Peck; Miranda Cosgrove; Nancy Sullivan; Jonathan Goldstein
- Theme music composer: Michael Corcoran; Drake Bell
- Composer: Michael Corcoran
- Country of origin: United States
- Original language: English

Production
- Executive producer: Dan Schneider
- Producer: Joe Catania
- Cinematography: Mike Spodnik
- Editors: Marc Lamphear; Skip Collector
- Running time: 73 minutes
- Production companies: Schneider's Bakery; Nickelodeon Productions

Original release
- Network: Nickelodeon
- Release: January 6, 2006

Related
- Sheep Thrills (previous episode); Megan's New Teacher (next episode)

Drake & Josh Go Hollywood is a 2006 American television comedy film starring Drake Bell and Josh Peck from the Nickelodeon television series Drake & Josh. It takes place during the events of the series' third season and first aired on January 6, 2006, and was released on VHS and DVD that same year on January 31. The film was the highest rated program on cable for the week with 5.4 million viewers.

== Plot ==
Josh struggles with his school assignment in which he must write an essay on one of the greatest adventures of his life. Meanwhile, Drake is frustrated with his band manager for booking him and his band inappropriate gigs at boring venues. Josh offers to become Drake's new manager, using this experience to write his essay, which Drake reluctantly accepts. When their parents, Audrey and Walter, leave to go on a ten-day cruise, Drake and Josh drive their sister Megan to the airport so she can visit her friend Jessica in Denver, Colorado.

However, Drake and Josh accidentally put Megan on the wrong flight to Los Angeles, California. Megan asks for a flight to Denver, but is temporarily unable to because of a storm there. Megan uses Walter's credit card to book a limousine service and a luxurious stay at the Chambroulay Hotel. Drake and Josh fly to L.A., where they find Megan and keep an eye on her. During this time, Josh meets a music producer in the hotel bathroom while playing one of Drake's songs on his laptop. The producer decides to book Drake an appearance on Total Request Live (TRL) for the next day.

Unfortunately, Josh later discovers that his G.O. (an MP3 player) was accidentally replaced on the flight with that of a man named Deegan due to an obese lady falling on Josh's lap, containing blueprints for counterfeit money. Deegan and his companion Brice Granger find and confront Drake and Josh. Deegan and Brice demand Josh to return Deegan's G.O., but Josh refuses. Drake and Josh escape, driving around L.A. in a Viper stolen from Tony Hawk. When they think they have lost them, Drake and Josh get pulled over by two men claiming to be FBI agents, who later reveal themselves as two more criminals who work with Deegan and Brice. The four offenders abduct Drake and Josh and take them to a warehouse, locking them away.

Back when Drake and Josh were at the San Diego airport, Josh had watched the news about some criminals who stole a monetary printing press from the U.S. Treasury Department three days before. Josh figures out that the group of assailants who abducted them, led by Milo McCreary, stole the printing press to forge counterfeit money. After making $500 million, the assailants plan to drown Drake and Josh and then escape to Brazil.

Meanwhile, Megan becomes concerned about her brothers' whereabouts when she finds Brice's wallet in her hotel room containing the address to the warehouse. The following morning, she has her limo driver take her to the warehouse, where she finds Drake and Josh tied up. She tries to alert the Los Angeles Police Department, but the phone connection goes out. Therefore, she sneaks into the warehouse and turns on two large fans, which blow around all the money. In the ensuing chaos, Drake and Josh finally break free and battle the crooks until the police come and arrest the offenders for counterfeiting money.

Megan uses some of the money she acquired from the warehouse to help her get to Denver, giving a portion as a tip to the limo driver. As a reward for capturing the crooks, the police offer Drake and Josh an escort to Sunset Studios for Drake's TRL appearance using Tony Hawk's Viper, which Hawk's manager gives them permission to use because Hawk has three more Vipers. Drake and Josh arrive at TRL just in time, where Drake performs his new song, "Hollywood Girl".

After his performance, the producer tells Drake he will pull some strings to allow him to audition for Spin City Records in New York City. With success in Drake's hands and Josh finally having something to write about for his greatest adventure, Drake and Josh cruise around and enjoy L.A. with two girls who have become fans of Drake's music during his TRL performance.

== Cast ==
- Drake Bell as Drake Parker
- Josh Peck as Josh Nichols
- Miranda Cosgrove as Megan Parker
- Nancy Sullivan as Audrey Parker Nichols
- Jonathan Goldstein as Walter Nichols
- John J. York as Milo McCreary
- Matt Newton as Deegan
- Nick von Esmarch as Brice Granger
- Jorge Luis Abreu as Ah'Lee
- Jordan Belfi as Mitch Gordon
- Colleen Kirley as MTV secretary
- Dylan MacKenzie as Security guard
- Gino Montesinos as Detective Jamison
- Michael Ralph as Police Chief Campbell
- Damien Fahey as himself
- Tony Hawk as himself

== Soundtrack ==
Along with the music composed for the film by Michael Corcoran, there were several songs featured in the film.

- "Steppin' Out" – Safety Orange
- "To Save a Man" – Safety Orange
- "Boyz" – Saucy Monky
- "Find Your Own" – A Million Seeds
- "Little Bit Lonely" – Julie Gribble
- "It's True" – Odds Against Tomorrow
- "Hollywood Girl" – Drake Bell
- "Don't Preach" – Drake Bell
- "Get It Right" – Backhouse Mike
- "Highway to Nowhere" – Drake Bell
- "Summer Sun" – Safety Orange

== Sequel ==
A second television film, Merry Christmas, Drake and Josh, aired on December 5, 2008, it serves the grand conclusion to the series after it ended in 2007. It broke the record of most viewers and beating another Nickelodeon television film iGo to Japan, which is a TV film based on Dan Schneider's follow-up series iCarly, which aired from 2007 to 2012, starring Drake & Josh co-star, Miranda Cosgrove.
