= Cleghorne! =

1995 American TV series

- Genre: Sitcom
- Created by: Steve Pepoon; David Silverman; Stephen Sustaric
- Directed by: Linda Day; David Grossman; Stan Lathan; Terri McCoy; John Sgueglia; David Trainer
- Starring: Ellen Cleghorne; Garrett Morris; Alaina Reed Hall; Steve Bean; Cerita Monet Bickelmann; Michael Ralph; Sherri Shepherd
- Composer: Tom Rizzo
- Country of origin: United States
- Original language: English
- No. of seasons: 1
- No. of episodes: 15 (3 unaired)

Production
- Executive producers: Steve Pepoon; David Silverman; Stephen Sustaric
- Producers: Coral Hawthorne; Adam I. Lapidus; Nancylee Myatt
- Running time: 22–24 minutes
- Production companies: Pepoon/ Silverman/ Sustarsic Productions; 20th Century Fox Television

Original release
- Network: The WB
- Release: September 10 – December 17, 1995

Cleghorne! is an American sitcom television series starring comedian Ellen Cleghorne that aired on The WB from September 10 to December 17, 1995. Garrett Morris and Alaina Reed Hall costarred as Ellen's character's parents, Sidney and Lena, with Steve Bean, Cerita Monet Bickelmann, Michael Ralph and Sherri Shepherd.

Among the first batch of original programming ordered by the newly launched WB network, the series was put on hiatus after 12 episodes in December 1995. The show was later canceled with three episodes left unaired.

== Synopsis ==
The series focuses on the life of Ellen Carlson (Cleghorne), a single mom who is raising her nine-year-old daughter Akeyla on Manhattan's Upper West Side. Comedic situations arise as Ellen tries to balance raising her daughter, running a local production company in SoHo, and the interference of her overbearing parents, Sidney and Lena, who live next door.

== Cast ==
=== Main ===
- Ellen Cleghorne as Ellen Carlson
- Garrett Morris as Sidney Carlson, Ellen's father
- Alaina Reed Hall as Lena Carlson, Ellen's mother
- Steve Bean as Brad, Ellen's partner
- Cerita Monet Bickelmann as Akeyla Carlson, Ellen's daughter
- Michael Ralph as Tyrell Livingston, Ellen's ex-husband
- Sherri Shepherd as Victoria Carlson

=== Recurring ===
- Cathy Silvers as Coral, a waitress at Piccolo's, the local bar
- Dorien Wilson as Jeff, a man Ellen dates who is the father of George, a student at Akeyla's private school

== Development ==
Cleghorne was the third black woman to be credited on Saturday Night Live (1991–1995), after Yvonne Hudson and Danitra Vance, and the first woman of color to appear on the series as a full-fledged cast member for longer than a single season. She left to focus on her starring role in her own sitcom, Cleghorne!. In 1995, Cleghorne! was among the first batch of original programming ordered by the newly launched WB network, then run by former Fox executives who had worked on shows like In Living Color, in which Cleghorne had also appeared. The sitcom was also the first time two Saturday Night Live cast members of color (Cleghorne and original SNL cast member Morris) had worked together on a show after appearing on SNL. The series was also the first television acting job for Sherri Shepherd.

== Episodes ==
No.	Title	Directed by	Written by	Original release date	Prod. code	Viewers (millions)
1	"Genesis"	Stan Lathan	Steve Pepoon & David Silverman & Stephen Sustarsic	September 10, 1995	3L01	2.5
Ellen reluctantly lets her parents and Victoria move into the apartment next door.
2	"Sister of the Bride"	John Sgueglia	Darryl J. Quarles	September 17, 1995	3L03	N/A
Facing deportation, Tyrell proposes to Ellen. She says no, but Victoria offers to marry him instead.
3	"My Daughter Attends the French School of New York (and Yours Doesn't)"	David Grossman	Mark Drop	September 24, 1995	3L04	2.1
Ellen enrolls Akeyla in an exclusive private school.
4	"All Grown Up and No Place to Go"	David Grossman	Rob Hanning	October 1, 1995	3L05	1.5
Ellen attends Akeyla's school dance and connects with another parent, Jeff.
5	"Adventures in Babysitting"	John Sgueglia	Adam I. Lapidus	October 8, 1995	3L02	2.1
Ellen's father will not let Ellen pay her mother babysit Akeyla, but Ellen does not want Lena to do it for free.
6	"The Parent Trap"	David Goldman	Nancylee Myatt	October 15, 1995	3L06	4.2
Ellen and Tyrell speak at Career Day at Akeyla's school.
7	"twenty-ninesomething"	Linda Day	Mindy Schneider	October 29, 1995	3L07	3.7
Ellen learns she is a year older than she thought.
8	"Losing Faith"	Terri McCoy	Michael Riedel	November 5, 1995	3L08	2.5
After the reverend she has encouraged Ellen to date confesses he is already married, a disillusioned Lena casts aside her religious beliefs and decides to live life in the fast lane for a while.
9	"Home Alone"	Terri McCoy	Amy Morland	November 12, 1995	3L09	4.0
With their parents out of town, Victoria feels neglected and clings to Ellen, who urges her to enjoy her independence. The advice backfires when Victoria throws a wild party that ends with a burglary.
10	"Girlfriendz"	David Grossman	Nancylee Myatt	November 19, 1995	3L10	3.4
Ellen cancels a meeting to tend to a friend who has left her husband, but winds up in a sticky situation when she runs into her client at a restaurant.
11	"This Magic Moment"	David Grossman	Rachel Lipman	November 26, 1995	3L11	3.2
Ellen tries to have a night alone with her boyfriend, but the family cannot stay away.
12	"Brother from Another Planet"	Linda Day	Nelson Costello	December 17, 1995	3L12	3.1
Ellen's therapist brother Rob comes home for Sidney and Lena's 35th-anniversary party, but his over-analysis of his parents' relationship causes Sidney to move out.
13	"Akeyla Doesn't Live Here Anymore"	N/A	N/A	Unaired	3L13	N/A
Ellen and Jeff take a ski trip with Akeyla and Jeff's son George, who are not getting along.
14	"Money for Nothing and Your Chicken for Free"	N/A	N/A	Unaired	3L14	N/A
Tyrell opens a restaurant.
15	"Sidney's Choice"	N/A	N/A	Unaired	3L15	N/A
Sidney enlists the family to help him win a bowling tournament.

== Broadcast ==
Cleghorne! debuted on The WB on September 10, 1995, but was put on hiatus in December 1995 having aired 12 episodes. The show was later cancelled with three episodes left unaired. Cleghorne later said, "I don't think I was ready. In terms of being strong and saying, 'I can write, this is what I do,' and feel confident in that. And to be able to say, 'No, this does not work, this works better.'"

== Reception ==
On review aggregator Rotten Tomatoes, Cleghorne! has an approval ratings of 40% based on 5 reviews, with an average score of 0.85/10. Slate called Cleghorne! "part of a chapter in television history, a rare moment when black audience demographics were taken seriously by networks and advertisers. Aside from the 1970s, this period [in the 1990s] featured one of the highest concentrations of black scripted programming ever."
