= Kelli Goss =

American actress

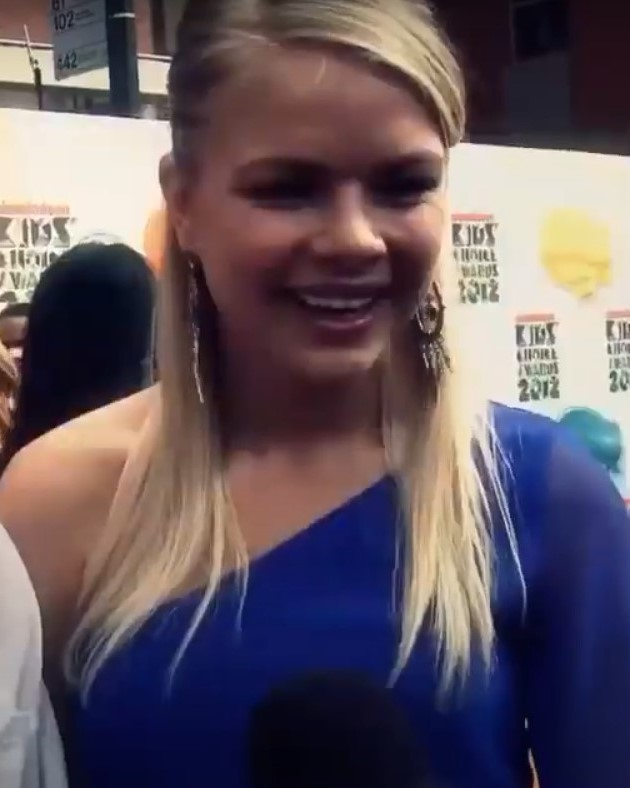
- Goss at the 2012 Kids' Choice Awards
- Born: Valencia, California, U.S.
- Occupation: Actress
- Years active: 2007–present
- Spouse: Justin Wilmers (m. 2021)
- Children: 2

Kelli Goss is an American film and television actress. She began her career appearing in a recurring roles in the Nickelodeon comedy series Big Time Rush (2010–13) and on the CBS daytime soap opera The Young and the Restless (2013–15). From 2016 to 2020, Goss played the role of Heather Roth in the Netflix comedy series The Ranch. From 2021 to 2022, she played main character Vanessa on the CBS sitcom United States of Al.

== Early life and career ==
Goss was born in Valencia, California. Her first television role was on the NBC sitcom My Name is Earl in 2007, then she appeared in United States of Tara in 2009. In 2010, she was cast in the role of Jennifer 2 on the Nickelodeon comedy series Big Time Rush, substituting temporarily for Spencer Locke while Locke was filming Resident Evil: Afterlife. Locke would return in the middle of the second season after finishing with the recording of the movie, however she reversed the decision because many people prefer the interpretation of Goss.

In 2012, Goss starred in the Lifetime movie Sexting in Suburbia, along with Liz Vassey, Jenn Proske and Ryan Kelley. Also that year, she had appeared on the Nick at Nite prime time soap opera Hollywood Heights as Hunter King's onscreen friend. In 2013, Goss was cast in the CBS daytime soap opera The Young and the Restless as Courtney Sloane, an undercover cop who becomes engaged to Noah Newman before her on screen death on April 6, 2015. The character was well received by critics.

In 2016 Goss began appearing in a recurring role as Heather Roth in the Netflix comedy series The Ranch with Ashton Kutcher, Danny Masterson, Debra Winger and Sam Elliott, until the end of the series in 2020.

Goss was cast in a lead role for the new CBS sitcom United States of Al, which premiered on April 1, 2021. Goss played Vanessa, the ex-wife of the main character Riley.

== Filmography ==
Year	Title	Role	Notes
2007	My Name is Earl	Joy	Episodes: "B.L.O.W" and "Darnell Outed: Part 1"
2009	United States of Tara	Adina	Episode: "Revolution"
2009	True Jackson VP	Monique	Episode: "House Party"
2009	Hannah Montana	Chelsea	Episodes: "Judge Me Tender" and "Come Fail Away"
2010	I'm in the Band	Trina	Episode: "Flip of Doom"
2010	Victorious	Jana	Episode: "Robarazzi"
2010	Memphis Beat	Jess Hatcher	Episode: "Love Her Tender"
2010–2013	Big Time Rush	Jennifer 2	Recurring role, 18 episodes
2012	Sexting in Suburbia	Skylar Reid	Television film
2012	Hollywood Heights	Kim	Recurring role
2013–2015	The Young and the Restless	Courtney Sloane	Recurring role
2015	The Big Bang Theory	Chelsea	Episode: "The Communication Deterioration"
2016	Furst Born	Brianna	Television film
2016–2020	The Ranch	Heather Roth	Recurring role
2017	Speechless	Ally	Episode: "B-I-- BIKINI U-N-- UNIVERSITY"
2018	Grey's Anatomy	Laura	Episode: "Old Scars, Future Hearts"
2020	World's Funniest Animals	Guest	1 episode
2021–2022	United States of Al	Vanessa	Main role
2024	Georgie & Mandy's First Marriage	Valerie	Episode: "A Regular Samaritan"
