= Mary Griffith (activist) =

American activist (1934–2020)

- Born: October 13, 1934; United States of America
- Died: February 7, 2020 (aged 85); Walnut Creek, California, U.S.
- Occupations: Teacher, activist

Mary Griffith (October 13, 1934 – February 7, 2020) was an American LGBTQ rights activist whose son, Bobby, died by suicide due to her religious intolerance. Following his suicide, Griffith became a longstanding LGBTQ rights activist.

== Bobby Griffith ==
Robert "Bobby" Warren Griffith (1963–1983) was Mary Griffith's son. Bobby died when he threw himself off a bridge in Portland, Oregon, aged 20. Bobby realised he was gay in high school and felt substantial shame over this. Writing in his diary, Bobby said: "I can't ever let anyone find out that I’m not straight. It would be so humiliating. My friends would hate me. They might even want to beat me up. And my family? I've overheard them. They've said they hate gays, and even God hates gays, too. Gays are bad, and God sends bad boys to Hell. It really scares me when they are talking about me."

After his coming out, Mary sent him to counselling at the Walnut Creek Presbyterian Church, and would put Bible verses around the house in an attempt to stop sinning. Bobby attempted suicide by overdosing on aspirin and dropped out of Las Lomas High School two months before his graduation. In 1983, Bobby moved to Portland with his boyfriend. Following a trip back to Walnut Creek, which Mary described Bobby as having "given up," he returned to Portland and threw himself off an overpass, dying when his body made contact with the highway and an 18-wheel truck.

A scholarship was set up in Bobby's name in 1990, administered by GLSEN.

== Activism ==
Following Bobby's suicide, Griffith reconsidered her opposition to homosexuality, and no longer believed that gay people would go to Hell. Griffith became involved with PFLAG, eventually becoming the president of a San Francisco chapter. Griffith also advocated for Gay Freedom Week, and for an increase in support for gay students in public schools.

On December 6, 1995, Griffith testified before the United States Congress, where she asked the federal government to fund LGBTQ-education in schools.

In 2019, Griffith wrote an article for The Advocate criticising the use of conversion therapy and asking religious conservatives to reconsider their position on homosexuality.

== Prayers for Bobby ==
Griffith's story was adapted into a book written by Leroy F. Aarons and published by HarperCollins in 1995, titled Prayers for Bobby: A Mother's Coming to Terms with the Suicide of Her Gay Son.

In 2009, a film, titled Prayers for Bobby, was produced. Griffith was played by Sigourney Weaver. In response to the film, Griffith noted that "the movie comes very close to what happened."

== Personal life ==
Griffith was born to a highly devout Christian family, and after a minor incident with the police when she was a teenager, she became a fundamentalist. Later she largely abandoned her fundamentalist perspective. Describing her religious beliefs in 2009, she said that "It's humiliating just to go through the Bible and see the fairy tales I believed, like that business about mixing fabrics." Griffith died in 2020, aged 85.
