= Mean Creek =

2004 film by Jacob Aaron Estes

- Theatrical release poster
- Directed by: Jacob Aaron Estes
- Written by: Jacob Aaron Estes
- Produced by: Rick Rosenthal; Susan Johnson; Hagai Shaham
- Starring: Rory Culkin; Ryan Kelley; Scott Mechlowicz; Trevor Morgan; Josh Peck; Carly Schroeder
- Cinematography: Sharone Meir
- Edited by: Madeleine Gavin
- Music by: Tomandandy
- Production company: Whitewater Films
- Distributed by: Paramount Classics (North and Latin America, United Kingdom and Australia); Focus Features (International)
- Release dates: January 15, 2004 (Sundance); August 20, 2004 (U.S.)
- Running time: 89 minutes
- Country: United States
- Language: English
- Budget: $500,000
- Box office: $802,948

Mean Creek is a 2004 American independent coming-of-age psychological drama film written and directed by Jacob Aaron Estes, produced by Susan Johnson, Rick Rosenthal, and Hagai Shaham, and starring Rory Culkin, Ryan Kelley, Scott Mechlowicz, Trevor Morgan, Josh Peck and Carly Schroeder. The film is about a group of teenagers in a small Oregon town who devise a plan to get revenge on an overweight, troubled bully during a boating trip. When their plan goes too far, they have to face unexpected consequences.

The film premiered at the Sundance Film Festival on January 15, 2004, and was screened at the Cannes Film Festival on May 14, 2004. It was given a limited release in major US cities on August 20, 2004, playing mostly at art house theaters. The film marks the first collaboration between Kelley and Schroeder (the second being in Prayers for Bobby in 2009).

== Plot ==
In a small Oregon town, overweight school bully George Tooney films himself playing basketball. Soft-spoken Sam Merrick notices George's camera and begins messing with it, resulting in George mercilessly attacking Sam physically. Sam tells his older brother Rocky about the incident, which Rocky, in turn, shares with his friends, Clyde and Marty, devising a plan for revenge. Part of the plan involves taking George on a boating trip to celebrate Sam's fictional birthday. They plan to take his clothes in a game of truth or dare, throw him into the river, and make him run home naked.

Sam invites his new girlfriend Millie to go along, and Marty drives the group to the river. During the ride, George reveals a different side of himself by being genuinely pleased to be invited and sharing that he is dyslexic. However, Sam does not tell Millie the real plan until they arrive near the river. Millie refuses to continue until Sam promises to call off the plan. Sam approaches Rocky, who discusses matters with Clyde and Marty; Marty is reluctant to back down. Throughout the trip, George clumsily attempts to fit in with the group. Despite this, he becomes confrontational when questioned about his motives (or lack thereof). The group soon realizes that although George is annoying, he is merely lonely and wants to be socially accepted.

On the boat, Marty deviates from the plan and initiates a game of truth or dare, although the rest decide to go along. After George sprays Marty with a water gun, he makes a quip about Marty's father, not remembering that it is a sore subject because Marty's father died by suicide. This triggers Marty, who exposes the whole plan. An angry George lashes out at the others, aiming homophobic slurs at Clyde about his two gay fathers and antisemitic pejoratives at Millie. The confrontation ends with George taunting Marty about his deceased father by repeatedly chanting, "His daddy splattered his brains all over the wall!". As Rocky tries to stop the fight, he accidentally shoves George off the boat and into the water.

Unable to swim, George struggles to remain afloat in the water. As the others watch the scene in terror, George accidentally hits his head with his camera and does not resurface. Rocky dives into the water and finds George, who is face down in the shallow water close to the shore. Millie attempts to give George CPR but is unsuccessful. Traumatized and in a panic, the group frantically digs a hole on the shore and buries George's corpse in a shallow grave.

Clyde plans to explain to the authorities that what had happened was an accident, but Marty threatens him, reminding Clyde that George's camera (now lost in the water) contains Marty's taped confession of the original plan, and the authorities will find out if the camera is discovered. Because they had already tricked George into not telling his mother where he was going, she would not know of their involvement, everyone initially agrees to stay silent about the situation and to let Marty handle everything, but they soon gather at Sam and Rocky's house that night. Sam, Rocky, Clyde and Millie are willing to face the consequences of their actions, as opposed to having George's death hanging over their heads. Marty refuses to turn himself in and feels betrayed. He storms out and convinces his brother to give him his gun and car. He robs a gas station and escapes into the night, becoming a fugitive.

Meanwhile, the others go to George's house and confess to his mother. Sam is soon seen inside an interrogation room, telling the story to the police, who find and view the tape from George's camera. The tape reveals George explaining his dream of becoming a filmmaker and documenting his life with the hope that those who see it will finally understand him. The police, accompanied by Sam's father and George's mother, force Sam to find the location of George's corpse. As the sheriff exhumes George's body, Sam watches with regret while George's mother cries in grief. George ends the video and turns off the camera.

== Cast ==
- Rory Culkin as Sam Merrick
- Ryan Kelley as Clyde
- Scott Mechlowicz as Marty Blank
- Trevor Morgan as Rocky Merrick
- Josh Peck as George Tooney
- Carly Schroeder as Millie
- Branden Williams as Kile Blank
- Raissa Fleming as Maggie Tooney
- Heath Lourwood as Jasper
- Michael Fisher-Welsh as Mr. Levinworth
- James W. Crawford as Tom Blank
- Shelly Lipkin as Mr. Merrick
- Kaz Garas as Detective Wright

== Production ==
=== Development ===
Mean Creek was conceived by director Jacob Aaron Estes circa 1996 and 1997. At the time, Estes felt there were very few films about kids dealing with a tragedy, a genre he had always admired as both a kid and an adult student of film. The film was independently financed with a budget of $500,000, although about $350,000 was spent off screen or donated.

=== Filming ===
Principal photography of Mean Creek began July 19, 2003, in several locations in Clackamas County, Oregon, including the cities of Boring, Sandy and Estacada. The crew was largely hired out of Portland, and the production headquartered in neighboring Gresham. Footage on the river was filmed on the Lewis River in southwest Washington.

== Release ==
Mean Creek premiered at the 2004 Sundance Film Festival, and was screened as part of the Directors' Fortnight at the 2004 Cannes Film Festival.

== Reception ==
=== Box office ===
Mean Creek received a limited release in North America in four theaters and grossed $29,170 with an average of $7,292 per theater. The film earned $603,951 domestically and $198,997 internationally for a total of $802,948. Based on a $500,000 budget, the film was considered a modest box-office success.

=== Critical response ===
On the review aggregator website Rotten Tomatoes, 88% of 121 critics' reviews are positive, with an average rating of 7.6/10. The website's consensus reads: "Mean Creek is an uncomfortably riveting glimpse into the casual cruelty of youth." Metacritic, which uses a weighted average, assigned the film a score of 74 out of 100, based on 31 critics, indicating "generally favorable" reviews.

Roger Ebert of the Chicago Sun-Times praised the acting and concept of teenagers making conscious moral decisions and wrote, "Mean Creek joins a small group of films including River's Edge and Bully which deal accurately and painfully with the consequences of peer-driven behavior. Kids who would not possibly act by themselves form groups that cannot stop themselves. This movie would be an invaluable tool for moral education in schools, for discussions of situational ethics and refusing to go along with the crowd."

A. O. Scott, writing for The New York Times, called it an "honest, provocative picture" and "earnest almost to a fault, exploring the moral difficulties of its characters with heartfelt—and at times heartsick—empathy".

Moira Macdonald of The Seattle Times praised the film's performances and added that "Estes has an uncanny knack for creating character, and for finding the kind of throwaway detail that resonates — the dull two-tone ring of a convenience-store door, for example, seems to speak volumes about the boredom and restlessness these kids face".

=== Accolades ===
| Award | Category | Subject | Result | Ref. |
|---|---|---|---|---|
| Deauville American Film Festival | Grand Special Prize | Jacob Aaron Estes | Nominated | |
| Flanders International Film Festival Ghent | Grand Prix | Jacob Aaron Estes | Nominated | |
| Humanitas Prize | Sundance Film Category | Jacob Aaron Estes | Won | |
| Independent Spirit Awards | John Cassavetes Award | Susan Johnson, Rick Rosenthal, and Hagai Shaham | Won | |
| Independent Spirit Awards | Special Distinction Award | Rory Culkin, Ryan Kelley, Scott Mechlowicz, Trevor Morgan, Josh Peck, and Carly Schroeder | Won | |
| Stockholm International Film Festival | Best Directorial Debut | Jacob Aaron Estes | Won | |
| Young Artist Awards | Best Leading Young Actor in a Feature Film | Rory Culkin | Nominated | |
| Young Artist Awards | Best Leading Young Actress in a Feature Film | Carly Schroeder | Nominated | |

== See also ==
- Dyslexia in popular culture
