= Anthony O'Brien =

American film director

- Born: Anthony Sean O'Brien; Portland, Oregon, U.S.
- Notable work: Perfect Sport, The Timber
- Website: www.anthonyseanobrien.com

Anthony O'Brien, is a director as well as a writer, producer, and editor. He grew up in Seattle, Washington and currently resides in Los Angeles, California. He is best known as the director of the feature film The Timber, starring Josh Peck and James Ransone. His directorial debut Perfect Sport won multiple awards.

== Awards ==
O'Brien co-starred in his directorial debut Perfect Sport, which was an official selection at Seattle International Film Festival and went on to win the SIFF People's Choice award. It also won the National Film Festival for Talented Youth Audience Award, and the Gold Remi award for Best Dramatic Feature Film at Worldfest Houston.

His second feature film The Timber was picked up for distribution in North America by Well Go USA, and was also distributed internationally. It was released in the United States in 2015.

== Filmography ==
Year	Film	Role
2008	Perfect Sport	Director, actor, producer, writer
2015	The Timber	Director, producer, editor, writer
