= Victor Zonana =

American journalist

Victor F. Zonana was the deputy assistant secretary for public affairs in the U.S. Department of Health and Human Services under Secretary Donna Shalala and President Bill Clinton. Before that, he was a special staff writer with the Los Angeles Times, covering business, economics, insurance, banking and health care issues, and was a staff writer for The Wall Street Journal. Zonana, who is gay, did "some of the most incisive AIDS reporting in the country and has written noteworthy pieces about the gay community."

Zonana won the John Hancock Award for Excellence in Journalism and the Gay and Lesbian Alliance Against Defamation media award. He was nominated for the Pulitzer Prize for Public Service. Zonana is a co-founder of the National Lesbian and Gay Journalists Association.

In 2002, Zonana co-founded Global Health Strategies globalhealthstrategies.com, a communications and advocacy firm. In 2015 Zonana sold most of his interest in the firm to the firm's co-founder, David Gold. Gold became CEO and Zonana was named chair."David Gold: Chief Executive Officer". globalhealthstrategies.com. Global Health Strategies.

In 2019, he was named a Sir Edmund Hillary Fellow and shortly thereafter co-founded Global Health New Zealand.

He is a graduate of Dartmouth College and lives in New York City.
