= List of Drake & Josh characters =

This article provides a list of characters from the American television sitcom Drake & Josh along with a brief synopsis of the time each of them spent on the show. Airing on Nickelodeon from January 11, 2004, to September 16, 2007, Drake & Josh was created by Dan Schneider, who also served as executive producer.

== Main characters ==
=== Drake Parker ===
Drake Parker (Drake Bell) is Josh's stepbrother, Megan's older biological brother, Audrey's biological son and Walter's stepson. Drake is depicted as an immature womanizing teenage slacker. Although he often appears unintelligent, his under-achievement seems to be caused by apathy, which leads him to make frequent impulsive decisions. The character Drake has a great interest in music and plays electric guitar in a band. He likes all genres of music including rock and country as seen in "Dance Contest" while he and Josh are seen in cowboy hats. He can also play drums and bongos. He can easily manipulate Josh in order to get what he wants. He has a lot of success with girls, and much of the comedy is his effortless ability to get dates. He often shrugs off the consequences of his actions, acts bitter towards others, plays dirty, lacks respect for them, slacks off at school, and uses other people, which can get him into trouble. Drake feels embarrassed about his new stepbrother at first but grew to accept Josh. Despite his desire to not spend time with Josh, Drake and Josh eventually become close friends and brothers. His character is similar to characters like Jesse Katsopolis from Full House, Eric Matthews from Boy Meets World, Joey Tribbiani from Friends, and Logan Reese from Zoey 101 due to his girl-crazy behavior.

=== Josh Nichols ===
Josh Nichols (Josh Peck) is Drake and Megan's stepbrother, Walter's biological son and Audrey's stepson. Unlike Drake, Josh is knowledgeable, diligent, caring, responsible, a good hard-working student and socially awkward. In the pilot episode, he had a job for the school newspaper in which he wrote advice for students under the name Miss Nancy. He begins working for Helen at the fictional Premiere movie theater in the second season. Unlike Drake, Josh often tries his best in challenging situations, takes things seriously, feels resourceful if he makes mistakes, and uses his common sense, often repeating things for emphasis when anxious. Despite his logical mind and hard-working nature, Josh is prone to bad luck in the first seasons, especially with girls. However, later in the series he begins to date Mindy Crenshaw, his academic rival and later got ahead of her in their graduating class. His hobbies include cooking and performing magic tricks. Later in the series, Josh becomes popular and has better luck as he loses weight and is also Drake's band manager. He is obsessed with Oprah Winfrey and accidentally runs her over with his car in "Josh Runs into Oprah", leading her to get a restraining order against him. Peck described his character as having a Jackie Gleason quality, and said, "Not only can Josh do the physical comedy and the pratfalls, but he can also sell a sophisticated joke and a touching moment." His characters are comparable to that of Joey Gladstone from Full House due to his goofiness and sometimes Danny Tanner due to his responsible behavior as well as Michael Barret from Zoey 101 due to his clumsiness and bad luck. He also has similarities to Friends character Ross Geller for his goofiness and clumsiness.

=== Audrey Parker-Nichols ===
Audrey Parker-Nichols (Nancy Sullivan) is Drake and Megan's biological mother, Josh's stepmother and Walter's wife. Her first name is never mentioned in the series, although a deleted scene from the series finale would have revealed Audrey. The scene would also specify her profession as a caterer.

She often tells the boys to be more mature. She upsets her husband, Walter, because of her preference for Bruce Winchill, his rival weatherman. Because Walter lacks respect from Megan and Drake, she usually has to punish them, although these punishments are usually unfair because most of the boys' wrongdoings are Megan's fault. As stepmother and stepson, Audrey and Josh have a very close relationship and he affectionately calls her "Mom" or "Mama." She is a nurturing and supportive mother. However, she is a bit gullible when it comes to her daughter Megan, especially when it is Megan's word against Drake and Josh.

=== Walter Nichols ===
Walter Nichols (Jonathan Goldstein) is Josh's biological father, Drake and Megan's stepfather and Audrey's husband. He is a meteorologist for a local TV news program in San Diego, but he is often wrong about the weather. Walter is often slow-witted, awkward, out-of-touch, and old-fashioned. As a result, he lacks the respect of his stepchildren combined with their arrogance, who refer to him by his first name, although they still do call him "dad" at times. When Megan calls him by his first name, he always asks when she started calling me Walter and Audrey replies, "I don't know." He is also oblivious and cynical regarding Megan's pranks, which have caused the boys many punishments. However, starting in the episode "The Demonator," Walter slowly begins to notice Megan's evil ways. A running gag involves a rivalry between him and Bruce Winchill, an unseen weatherman from another station. He hates that Winchill is so popular, as he is always right with his predictions. He even forbids the use of Winchill's name in the family home. His character is comparable to that of Danny Tanner from Full House due to his responsible parenting.

=== Megan Parker ===
Megan Parker (Miranda Cosgrove) is the younger biological sister of Drake, stepsister of Josh, biological daughter of Audrey and stepdaughter of Walter. Megan often references a best friend named Janie and often refers to her older brothers as "boobs." She is essentially the main antagonist of the series, usually bullies her brothers, although sometimes Megan helps them in episodes like "The Gary Grill", "Honor Council", "The Drake & Josh Inn" and "Drake & Josh: Go Hollywood". It has also been shown that she is very wise and intelligent; she can play very severe, torturous and sometimes complicated (or even potentially dangerous) pranks on her brothers, all while ensuring that her parents think of her as being a sweet, angelic, harmless, and innocent little girl. However, in numerous episodes like “The Bet” and “The Affair,” Megan had made rude remarks to Drake and Josh in front of her mother, who does not intervene, and also in "Really Big Shrimp" when she sassed off to Lula when she rudely demanded Megan guacamole, with Walter intervening instead of her mother. Another episode shows that she has a hidden computerized monitor in her room, giving her surveillance of the house to aid in her pranks against Drake and Josh. Most of the time throughout the series, Megan is very mean-spirited and cruel to her brothers. However, despite her mistreatment of them, Megan loves her brothers deep down. She had shown them genuine love and support when they uncovered that her boyfriend Corey (Christian Vandal) had been cheating on her with another girl named Monica. Although she does get in trouble at times such as in "Treehouse" when she's forced to help rebuild their neighbor's treehouse as a result of her helping Drake and Josh when they ask her for it. Her character is similar to characters like Sam Puckett due to her sassy and violent behavior and Chuck Chambers due to her prankster ways, from Miranda Cosgrove's latter show iCarly as well as Jade West from Victorious both shows of which were created by Dan Schneider as well as Angelica Pickles from Rugrats, D.W. Read from Arthur and Caillou due to her sassy and spoiled bratty behavior.

== Recurring characters ==
=== Helen Dubois ===
Helen Ophelia Dubois (Yvette Nicole Brown) is the manager of the Premiere Theater, connected to the Premiere Galleria mall. She is Josh's boss at the theater and is known for her intimidating demeanor, loud voice, and demanding attitude towards employees. She adores Drake but dislikes Josh despite the hard work he puts in at the theater. She starred in the hit 1970's TV series called Happy Times, which is intended to reference the real-life series called 'Good Times'. She married Buzz Baxter in "Drake & Josh: Really Big Shrimp" but divorced him sometime before Merry Christmas, Drake & Josh after five weeks and starts finally treating Josh with respect. Yvette Nicole Brown played Helen for most of the series, except the Season 2 episode "Little Diva," in which Frances Callier took over the role.

Helen appears in a 2011 episode of Victorious in which she becomes the principal of Hollywood Arts High School. She later appears in a 2015 episode of Game Shakers, in which she hosts her talk show titled The Helen Show. Helen appears in the Victorious spin-off show Hollywood Arts.

=== "Crazy" Steve ===
Steve (Jerry Trainor) is an employee at the Premiere movie theater who is noted for his emotional and mental instability, lashing out at co-workers, strangers, and passersby over little things. He is also incredibly sensitive. Steve takes offense at the slightest of subjects or even the most thoroughly minor hints at insults, hollering at others for interrupting him or denying his questions, desires, or offers. Steve's utter lack of sanity has earned him a dangerously unpredictable reputation amongst colleagues, to the extent where he finds immense frustration in following along with episodes of Dora the Explorer, screaming at the animated characters on the screen. In seasons 2 and 3, he had a lot of hair, but in season 4, his head was shaved. He appears in the program's 2008 Christmas special, most notably towards its conclusion, where he shreds hunks of cheese in a wood chipper to grant his friends' wish for a white Christmas. He later appeared in a 2014 episode of the series Sam & Cat where he is revealed to have been placed at a mental institution for the sick, with a restrictive mask over his face.

=== Mindy Crenshaw ===
Mindy (Allison Scagliotti) is a clever but arrogant girl at school who is always trying to be better than Josh, who is her rival. She also shows an intense dislike for Drake, and the feeling is mutual. One of Mindy's well-known character traits is her genius-level intellect and scientific talents. She defeats Josh yearly in the science fair except for one year after they started to date, where she let him win. Mindy and Josh start dating in season 3 after both confess their feelings for each other.

=== Craig Ramirez and Eric Blonowitz ===
Craig (Alec Medlock) and Eric (Scott Halberstadt) are a duo of stereotypical nerd students that are always being exploited by Drake, mostly due to his hare-brained schemes. Drake often mistakes Eric for Craig when Craig is absent. Craig corrected him one time in "Eric Punches Drake" and Drake sarcastically said, "It matters." Eric first appeared in the pilot episode as an extra and along with his best friend, Craig, a few times in Seasons 2 and 3, but they occur more frequently in Season 4 and appear in the series finale Really Big Shrimp. Eric left for Puerto Rico in the final episode, "Dance Contest." Craig and Eric appear with another Drake & Josh character, Gavin, in the 2010 iCarly episode "iStart a Fan War", implying that the two series take place within the same universe.

=== Gavin Mitchell ===
Gavin (Jake Farrow) works with Josh at the Premiere, and he has a mullet-like haircut similar in fashion to Rod Stewart (in "Who's Got Game" he got a perm). Throughout the series, a running gag involved Helen asking him to tell Josh to clean something unusual in the theater. He usually declines to do it himself when Josh asks if he would do it. He then cleans up the mess himself - telling Josh, "I got it." He also has a crush on Audrey. He first appeared in "Driver's License" and made an appearance in Merry Christmas, Drake & Josh. Gavin appears in iCarly in Season 4 episode "iStart a Fan War" with Craig and Eric.

=== Mrs. Hayfer ===
Mrs. Hayfer (Julia Duffy) is the boys' English teacher who adores Josh due to his hard-working personality but hates Drake because of his consistently poor performance in school; likewise, as noted by his doodles of her in his notebook, as seen in "Honor Council," Drake hates her in return. In the episode "Mean Teacher," Mrs. Hayfer is shown to hate Drake for no apparent reason except for how he shrugs school off and doesn't do outstanding work much as it is shown that when he answered a question correctly, she dubbed it incorrect and appointed the same problem correct to another student right next to him as well as grading a flawless report he did with a "D−" again for no logical reason. In fact, her catchphrase is "I hate you, Drake," with Drake responding, "I know." She also always says, "To the nurse!" which is her way of telling people to leave her classroom. In "Little Sibling," Mrs. Hayfer says it to Josh when she wanted to have a private talk with Drake. Mrs. Hayfer has a daughter named Kelly, who Drake briefly dates, much to her discontent. In "Honor Council," she comes into the classroom to find her car parked where the boys' seats are initially and accuses Drake of putting the car there, but her star student, Mindy, is the real culprit. Drake hates Mrs. Hayfer so much that he wishes she would die, as seen in the episode, "Megan's First Kiss," in which Josh says, "You're not gonna believe this," and Drake asks in an anxious and excited tone, "Mrs. Hayfer died?!"

Mrs. Hayfer has a Rottweiler named Tiberius, who appears in the season 4 episode "Vicious Tiberius" and is violent towards Drake and Josh, who had agreed to house sit for her.

She has a brief appearance in Merry Christmas, Drake & Josh, where Drake accidentally hits a fire hydrant while driving, resulting in water getting sprayed all over her. She then points out and yells her famous line: "I hate you, Drake Parker!" Meaning that even though Drake and Josh have graduated from Belleview High, Mrs. Hayfer still hates Drake.

In the season 2 finale, "Honor Council," Josh mentions her full name as Alice Hayfer. However, in "Vicious Tiberius," a video shows her full name as being Linda Hayfer.

=== Dr. Jeff Glazer ===
Dr. Glazer (Roark Critchlow) is a doctor who lives across the street from the boys. He is always called on whenever a severe emergency happens at their house. Although he always seems kind while performing medical procedures for the boys, he still leaves them with a ridiculously high bill for his services (he once charged $100 for diagnosing a sheep as pregnant after it had already given birth and an extra $50 not to tell Audrey and Walter, charged $300 for diagnosing Drake's facial rash, and charged $500 for diagnosing Ashley Blake's accident after she got hit in the head with a bucket).

=== Leah ===
Leah (Cathy Shim) is a co-worker and friend of Josh at the Premiere during the fourth season, appearing in the episodes "I Love Sushi", "Josh is Done", "Really Big Shrimp", and "Helicopter".

=== Bruce Winchill ===
Although Bruce Winchill is never seen in Drake & Josh, he is mentioned throughout the series. He is a rival weatherman of Walter, and he always gets the weather right. Megan and Audrey have a crush on him because he has good hair. Walter is jealous of Bruce.

== Guest appearances ==
- Grammy (Randee Heller) is Josh's grandmother, Walter's mother and Papa Nichols' daughter-in-law. She is later mentioned frequently when she sent gifts to Josh. Drake and Grammy don't get along very well when they first meet, but they start liking each other better with time.
- Papa Nichols (John Brandon) is Josh's great-grandfather, Walter's grandfather and Grammy's father-in-law, and a World War II veteran who appears only in the episode "The Demonator". When Drake, Josh, and Megan sneak out of the house to ride The Demonator, they have Craig and Eric watch Papa Nichols. He is later mentioned once by Josh in "The Wedding".
- Jackie (Robin Sydney) is obsessed with Drake and appeared in a total of four episodes. She would come into the scene randomly (usually at the end, specifically when something positive happens to Drake) and shout hysterically, "I love you! Bye!" In response, Drake and/or Josh would ask, "Who are you? or Who is she?"
- Ashley Blake (Skyler Samuels) is a child actress who appeared as the main antagonist in "Little Diva." She is very spoiled and demanding but acts like a sweet, angelic, harmless, and innocent little girl in front of Helen. She bosses Drake and Josh around, but she gets along well with Megan, who thinks exactly like her.
- Wendy (Alyson Stoner) whose real name is Melissa, but hates it, is a girl that had an obsessive crush on Drake in "Number 1 Fan", to the point of deluding herself into thinking she would marry him someday, which caused her to be teased by some of her friends after Drake confronted her about her obsession with him. She is in the Campfire Kids scouts with Megan, and they are friends.
- Sammy (Jordan Wright) is a young child that Drake needed to take care of as part of a Big Sibling program as a punishment who appeared in "Little Sibling". However, he ends up forming a bond with Josh, much to Drake's dismay. Sammy is one of the few people to think that Josh is cooler than Drake, and Josh appreciates this.
- Tyler (Skyler Gisondo) is Megan's assistant who appeared in "I Love Sushi" when she hires him to prank Drake and Josh.
- Robbie Carmichael (Matthew Evans) is an emotional little boy who is Drake and Josh's neighbor. He is the owner of the tree house that Drake and Josh accidentally destroy in the episode "Tree House." He has a very loud, shrieking cry, as seen when he cries over his ruined tree house. This causes other characters to cover their ears. He has said that his tree house was the only place he could cry in private.
- Greg Carmichael (Dink O'Neal) is Drake and Josh's neighbor and the father of Robbie Carmichael. He seems to have some trouble parenting his emotional son. In "Tree House," he fears how Robbie will react when his treehouse burned down.
- Trevor (Taran Killam) is Drake's absent-minded friend and Scottie's older brother. Even though he only appeared in "Dune Buggy," he is mentioned several times in the series.
- Yooka (Anastasia Baranova) is Josh's foreign pen pal who appeared in "We're Married". She comes to visit Drake and Josh from her fictional country of Yudonia. Drake and Josh soon learn that she is homesick, so they hold a Yudonian friendship ceremony, which turns out to be a marriage ceremony between her and Drake.
- Hewitt (Hans Cho) is Drake's rival in the school talent show in "Blues Brothers." When Drake and Hewitt encounter each other in the episode multiple times, they taunt each other. They also often start each interaction by saying each other's names with emphasis. Hewitt is the leader of his singing group, and they are also in Belleview High School's choir.
- Clayton (Josh Sussman) is one of the nerdy teenagers at school who has speech problems. He's considered a nerd even by Craig and Eric. Clayton has a few humorous interactions with Drake.
- Thornton (Jeff Braine) is Drake and Josh's friend who appeared in "The Battle of Panthatar". Drake and Josh are invited to his sweet 16 party at Club Diego which will air on MTV live. However, their invitations are revoked after he catches Drake kissing a girl named Maria, who unbeknownst to him was Thornton's girlfriend.
- Maria (Josie Loren) is Thornton's girlfriend during the episode "The Battle of Panthatar". While Thornton was preparing for his 16th birthday party, he caught Maria cheating on him with Drake. This incident caused Thornton to break up with her and revoke the invitations of Drake and Josh, the former for kissing Maria and the latter for attempting to defend Drake.
- Janie (Jasmine McNeal) is Megan's best friend. She is mentioned in several Season 4 episodes and appears in "Megan's Revenge" and "Megan's First Kiss."
- Corey (Christian Vandal) is a boy who was dating Megan and Monica simultaneously in the episode, “Megan's First Kiss.”
- Monica (Kelly Hayer) is a girl who was dating Megan's boyfriend, Corey, for one month, unbeknownst to Megan and Monica, respectively.
- Leslie (E. E. Bell) is a wisecracking tow truck driver who appeared in the episode "The Wedding." He comes across Drake and Josh when they are stranded in the middle of nowhere when they had to borrow Trevor's old car after it broke down on the way to their great aunt Catherine's wedding. Drake observes Leslie's name on his name tag and asks if Leslie is his wife, only to learn Leslie is the man's name. Drake then laughs and says Leslie is a girl's name. Leslie gets offended and tells him he was named after his father and grandfather on his father's side, and "they both fought in wars," to which Drake says he's dated five girls named Leslie. Leslie then tells the boys they can "rot in a sack" for all he cares, and he drives away.
- Vince (D. Elliot Woods) is a helicopter pilot who appears in "Helicopter." He gives Drake a lesson about skydiving, and he takes him and Josh on a ride in his helicopter. However, he becomes unconscious after hitting his head on a fire extinguisher. Josh accidentally sprays him out of the helicopter while Vince was holding a parachute by one of the straps. He angrily gives Walter a $400,000 bill for the damaged helicopter as Drake and Josh ground themselves for 2 weeks.
- Alan Krim (Joseph Will) is the Vice President of Spin City Records. He works with Drake and Josh in "Really Big Shrimp," and serves as the antagonist of the special. Alan has Josh sign a contract, and then he electronically remixes Drake's song. Drake does not like the remix.
- Nick Mateo (Jay Bontatibus) is the President of Spin City Records. He also works with Drake and Josh in "Really Big Shrimp." Nick is unhappy with Alan remixing Drake's song.
- Molly (Alysse Cepeda) is one of Megan's friends that help Megan decorate cakes for a bake sale in "Really Big Shrimp." She and Megan's other friends do this in Drake and Josh's room because Megan's room is unavailable. Molly tells Megan to tell Josh that she thinks he is cute.
- Drew (James Immekus) and Jerry (Stephen Markarian) are two boys who look and act like Drake and Josh and appeared only in the episode "Drew & Jerry."
- Henry Doheny (Steve Tom) is a formerly famous magician who appeared in "The Great Doheny." He is a parody of Harry Houdini. Josh is a big fan of him, but Drake gets annoyed by his magic tricks after a while. Doheny loves to play tricks on other people.
- Lenny Spodnick (Fred Stoller) is the stadium clerk who appeared in "Foam Finger". He worked at the Padres stadium selling foam fingers, but he got promoted to selling bobbleheads.
- Kathy (Erin Chambers) is a student that attends Belleview High School. She is Josh's first crush who appears in "First Crush." Drake tries to help Josh get to know her.
- Denise Crenshaw (Maggie Wheeler) is Mindy Crenshaw's third cousin. She is a makeup artist, and she has worked on the movie Ghost Monsters (parody of Ghostbusters). In "Alien Invasion," Drake and Josh hire Denise to make them look like aliens to prank Megan.
- Coach Davis (Charles Levin) is Josh's football coach who appeared in "Football".
- Coach Remmers (Paul Parducci) is Drake's gym class coach. He visits Drake and Josh's home to tell their parents that Drake is failing gym due to skipping class in "Dance Contest".
- Mr. Talbot (Andy Milder) is the Remedial English teacher (a class with a lack of discipline with its poorly behaved students) who appeared in "Little Sibling". In Drake's flashbacks and in real life, he is seen tied up during class multiple times, presumably by his students. He asks any of his students for help multiple times.
- Mr. Roland (Tom Virtue) is Drake and Josh's chemistry teacher who appeared in "Josh is Done" and "Eric Punches Drake".
- Ms. Hunter (Joyce Lee) is Megan's teacher. In "Megan's New Teacher," she has Josh teach her own class for his student teaching role.
- Mr. Headsof (Braeden Marcott) is Drake and Josh's teacher that assigns his class a video project in "Believe Me, Brother." He is annoyed by Drake and Josh's argument, so he tells them to present their project first.
- Ethan (Paul Rust) is one of the students that enters the science fair in "Mindy Loves Josh." He enters a "watermelon lamp" for the science fair. Despite entering a "watermelon lamp" the previous year, he says his new one is seedless. Ethan is then disqualified for using the same idea for the competition two years in a row.
- Diana Vosh (Jill Latiano) is a supermodel that shows up at Drake and Josh's door due to being lost in "Megan's Revenge." Drake and Josh are both excited about this.
- Roki (Tony LaThanh) is Josh's replacement partner for his Chemistry class in "Josh is Done." Josh wants to change his class partner because he stops associating with Drake.

== Drake's girlfriends ==
Drake has several girlfriends throughout the series:

- Susan (Ashley Drane) is Drake's girlfriend in the episode "Believe Me, Brother," in which she secretly flirts with Josh. She is later exposed, and as revenge, Drake and Josh plant purple paint in her locker, and it is splattered all over her when she opens the door.
- Michelle (Kate Miner) is Drake's girlfriend in the episode "Smart Girl". Drake falls for Michelle at the Premiere which leads to him intentionally dropping the gummy bears on the floor for her to help pick them up for him. She then suggests that they hang out. As they're dating Drake lies about his favorite author and what he likes most about him as he does not read books himself, in order to impress Michelle. She tells him that she will be participating in the Academic Bowl and Drake unknowingly decides to join in, thinking she wanted to make out with him. So Drake devises a plan to win at the academic bowl which is for Josh to tell him the answers through the walkie-talkie. Even though the Belleview team wins, Drake then takes Michelle to the janitor's closet where Josh previously was when he was giving him the answers, to confess to her that he wasn't as brainy as she thought he was and that he didn't know who Mark Twain was, that he hated foreign films and that the only reason he knew the names of those gases was that Josh helped him in an all-night study session. And that he didn't study all night for the academic bowl because he did it to impress her. Michelle returned her feelings for Drake despite his poor performance in school and kisses him.
- Kelly Hayfer (Chelsea Brummet) is Mrs. Hayfer's daughter. She appears only in the episode "Mean Teacher," in which she dates Drake. She has a laughing problem throughout the episode, which secretly annoys Drake. However, he does not break up with her, fearing retaliation from Mrs. Hayfer. Although Kelly loves Drake, she ends the relationship – much to his excitement – because she does not believe it is working out.
- Tori (Torrey DeVitto) is Drake's girlfriend in the episode "Playing the Field," in which he breaks up with her. When Tori quickly begins dating other boys, Drake dates Liza Tupper – who he has nicknamed Hot Liza – to make Tori jealous. In the episode "Dr. Phyllis Show," it is mentioned that Liza is the daughter of Dr. Phyllis, the host of a television talk program when the host becomes angry after Drake insults Liza by calling her dumb and a bad kisser.
- Lucy (Gabrielle Christian) is introduced in the episode "Girl Power," in which she physically defends Drake against a football player. Drake then considers ending their relationship, as he does not want to be with someone tougher than him. Later in the episode, Drake and Lucy wrestle to determine who is tougher, although Drake is hesitant about wrestling a girl.
- Carly (Brittany Curran) becomes Drake's girlfriend in the episode "Who's Got Game," in which Josh challenges Drake on who can get the most dates. Drake meets her at the CD shop where she works, and he falls in love with her at first sight. Carly grows fond of Drake, too, after meeting him but furiously dumps him when she finds out about the bet, thinking Drake is just using her. He then proves to her that he can be honest and they continue dating.

Lucy and another girl, Christine (Sarah Christine Smith), appear as ex-girlfriends of Drake in the episode "The Storm." They become friends with Carly, who is still dating Drake. The three bonded over how Drake is a good kisser by giggling about it. The episode marks Lucy and Carly's final appearance in the series. Drake flirts with other girls, including Grant Widner, in subsequent episodes such as "Tree House." He is also seen with girls like Becca (Vanessa Hudgens) and Lexi (Dianna Agron).

== Drake's band ==
Drake has a band in which he is both the frontman and lead guitarist.

Rina (Molly Orr) was the bass player in Drake’s band in Season 1, she is a typical rocker teen girl. She also doesn’t know how to change a diaper as seen in the episode “Two Idiots and A Baby.” She drives away in her car at the end scene where Drake suggests, “You’re a girl, why don’t you change his diaper?” She eventually peer pressures Drake with her other bandmate into going to the Rock Shock concert not knowing Scottie photocopied the tickets illegally. She is never seen again after season 1. It is strongly implied that she either was arrested and got grounded by her parents or transferred out after this episode because of her involvement. It is also likely she is in a different band after she got into trouble.

Paul (Jeremy Ray Valdez) was the guitarist in Drake’s band in Season 1, he gives advice in “Two Idiots and A Baby” to Drake and Josh. Drake also makes comments about Paul at the concert he was going to play to two girls. Paul with his other bandmate peer pressures Drake into going to the Rock Shock concert. Paul and his other bandmate make fun of Drake for obeying his Grandmother. Not knowing that Scottie photocopied the tickets illegally. Eventually, Drake decides to go, after this Paul is never seen again. It is strongly implied he got into legal trouble, got grounded and possibly transferred to a different school or he is playing in another band.

Scottie (Johnny Lewis) was the drummer of Drake's band in Season 1 and is Trevor's younger brother. He is considered to be unintelligent, according to Drake and the other band members. Rina (Molly Orr) is the bassist of Drake's band, while Paul (Jeremy Ray Valdez) is the rhythm guitarist. They only appeared in four episodes in Season 1. Drake and the three band members are detained at a concert because Scottie photocopied their tickets in the episode "Grammy," the three's final appearance. Drake’s Grandmother shows up to bail Drake out and after this, he is never seen again. It is strongly implied he got into legal trouble with his other 2 bandmates, transferred out and got grounded and is likely now a drummer for a new band.

In the episode "Megan's New Teacher," Drake has 5th grader Neil Kramer (Ridge Canipe) play in his band after his original drummer leaves. Neil initially fails a pop quiz by Josh, who is serving temporarily as a student-teacher. Neil's mother then forbids him from playing in the band, so Drake and Megan get Josh fired, leading to Neil playing for Drake's band at the Premiere's third anniversary. Neil does not appear in any subsequent episodes.

Three band members, Gary (Dan Mott), Julio (Shiloh Fernandez), and an unnamed guitarist, appear in "The Storm." Gary is the goofy and self-absorbed drummer. He has a tattoo of a foot on his chest and likes to wear girls' shirts, including his sister Elaine's blouse and Megan's panda shirt. Julio is the band's bassist, and he was mentioned in the episode "Josh Runs Into Oprah." The rhythm guitarist is an African American but is only seen with the band.
