= Sexting in Suburbia =

2012 American TV film

- Written by: John Stimpson; Marcy Holland
- Directed by: John Stimpson
- Country of origin: United States
- Original language: English

Original release
- Network: Lifetime
- Release: January 14, 2012

Sexting in Suburbia (sometimes called Shattered Silence) is a 2012 Lifetime film directed by John Stimpson and starring Liz Vassey, Jenn Proske, Ryan Kelley and Kelli Goss.

== Plot ==
The film opens as school pariah, Dina Van Cleve (Jenn Proske) walks down the hallway of her school. When she opens her locker, a pile of condoms that were put inside as a prank comes falling out. Later, Dina is shown alone in her bedroom recording a video diary. When her mother, Rachel (Liz Vassey) returns home, she finds Dina has hanged herself.

The film then flashes back six weeks, showing Dina as a popular and talented field hockey player who was voted Homecoming Queen at her school. However, the night ends on a bad note when she changes her mind about giving her virginity to her boyfriend, Mark (Ryan Kelley), who leaves angry. Dina returns home while Mark goes to an after party and cheats on Dina with her rival, Skylar Reid (Kelli Goss). Dina takes a few pictures of herself naked and sends them to Mark the next morning. But when she arrives at school, she is surprised by applause from the student body and soon realizes that her pictures have been seen around campus. Distraught by a wall of cruel comments written about her in the girls' bathroom already, Dina demands that Mark tell her to whom he sent the photos, but he swears he didn't do it.

Back in the present, Rachel is in Dina's room when someone calls Dina's phone. It turns out to be one of her friends, who was studying abroad. She tells Rachel that the only way she'll find anything about Dina is to look online. Rachel discovers Dina's video diary and tries to question Claire Stevens (Rachel Delante), who won't tell her anything. After going to the school administration to question the social networking profiles that were cyber bullying Dina, Rachel writes an article damning the school administration when they refuse to help her and seem more interested in covering up the entire incident. The article catches the attention of many news networks and causes the administration to endure severe backlash, but it also damages Rachel's cause. No one at Dina's school will talk to her and she loses some of her real estate work because no one will buy a house from her.

Rachel becomes the target of a revenge campaign. Someone stuffs her mailbox full of letters that say "Leave It Alone" with cut-out letters and a picture of a noose. Dina's grave is vandalized with someone spray painting "Dina is a slut" and leaving her torn letter and condoms. After breaking down and begging Mark to tell her what happened, which he doesn't do, Rachel heads home. Upon her return, someone throws a brick through the front window, breaking the glass.

Mark is arrested for possessing child pornography. One of the school administrators visits Rachel's home and tells her the news, but Rachel remains unapologetic due to the school keeping Dina's bullying hidden instead of stopping it.

Driving, Rachel spots Claire and asks her what she knows. Claire reveals that she saw Skylar and Mark hooking up at the after party and witnessed Dina begging Mark to help her stop the circulation of the pictures. However, Skylar walked up and insulted her, causing Dina to leave. Skylar then revealed she sent the pictures from Mark's phone to one other person to prove Dina wasn't the saint she acted like.

Mark comes by to visit Rachel and as the two talk, Mark once again says that he wasn't the one who sent the pictures around. Due to what she heard from Claire, Rachel believes him and learns from him Dina started skipping field hockey after the bullying got worse. Rachel thanks Mark for his help and goes to visit her long-time friend and Skylar's mom, Patricia (Judith Hoag).

In a flashback, Claire asks Skylar to lay off Dina. However, Skylar says that someone should report Dina to the coach so she will get kicked off the team. She later manipulates Claire into doing it since she can't because she lost the position of team captain to Dina and it would look like "sour grapes". Skyler also talks about why Dina sent a nude photo ending one of the sentences with "no birthmarks" while Claire still listens to the former of which's point of view.

At the Reid house, Rachel tells Patricia that she knows Skylar was the one who sent the pictures out. Despite their daughters' rivalry, Patricia refuses to believe Skylar would do something so terrible. Patricia then asks her daughter in front of Rachel if she sent the pictures and Skylar says no. Rachel asks to see Skylar's phone, but Patricia refuses. − After Rachel breaks down, Patricia offers to make her some tea while she fixes herself up in the bathroom. While inside, Rachel knocks over a pile of magazines and sees the original cut-out words from the letters in her mailbox. After Rachel leaves without revealing what she has found, Skylar tells her mom that she did send the pictures out, but to only one person. Rachel decides to drop the charges against Mark, but wants to change the direction of the investigation to focus on Skylar. However, the police reveal that Claire was the one Skylar sent the pictures to and she proceeded to send it to forty other people.

Rachel goes home and hears one of Dina's video diaries playing. In Dina's room, she finds Claire, who runs away. Rachel watches the video where Dina reveals that she got kicked off the field hockey team because of the pictures and lost her scholarship (which Skylar then gained) because her coach was forced to report it to her college of choice. It turns out this video diary was the last one Dina made before she committed suicide.

In the flashback, Dina is clearing out her locker when Skylar begins gloating. The two get into a nasty fight until Skylar reveals that Claire was the one who told the coach. Feeling completely betrayed, Dina viciously turns on Claire just as she walks in. Clearly upset by the entire situation, Claire says that she just didn't want the whole team to be disqualified if Dina's pictures were discovered.

Pleading her innocence, Claire insists that she didn't send the pictures, but intended to destroy them. However, she forgot her phone in the limo on Homecoming and it ended up back at Skylar's house. Slowly, Rachel realizes that Patricia sent the pictures from Claire's phone just as a furious Skylar confronts her mother after discovering the copies on Patricia's phone. She also realizes that it was her mother who trashed Dina's gravesite and threw the brick through Rachel's window. Patricia pleads with Skylar to understand that she did everything for her because she never would've gotten the field hockey scholarship to Price otherwise.

Disgusted by her mother's actions as well as her lack of remorse and refusal to take any responsibility for driving Dina to suicide, Skylar takes the family car and runs away, but crashes into a tree shortly after while angrily texting Patricia "I will never forgive you" after her mother sent her a message begging forgiveness. Patricia is at the same time arrested by the police for her involvement in regards of child pornography.

Rachel visits Skylar in the hospital, where it is revealed that she may be paralyzed from the waist down permanently. Patricia asks if Rachel came to gloat, but Rachel apologizes that Patricia is going through what she went through, that she found Dina as a threat to Skylar's success and that their friendship was not real as it was before. She promises to pray for Skylar's recovery, but vows to see Patricia in court and ensure that she is punished for what she did to Dina. Rachel then leaves as Patricia breaks down in tears.

Rachel is shown recording a video diary of her own, wondering if her quest to understand what Dina went through has made any difference. Claire visits her house and asks Rachel to come with her to the school because she has a surprise. Rachel enters the packed auditorium where Claire gives a passionate speech about bullying and the deadly consequences of it. She goes on to say that Dina was bullied to death and that her suicide was the fault of everyone who not only participated in the bullying itself, but those who allowed it to continue instead of stopping it (including herself). Starting with her and Mark, the other students then give up their cell phones for the rest of the semester and vow to prevent further bullying at the school. The movie ends with Rachel watching one of Dina's earlier video diaries with Claire.

== Cast ==
- Liz Vassey as Rachel Van Cleve
- Jenn Proske as Dina Van Cleve
- Ryan Kelley as Mark Carey
- Kelli Goss as Skylar Reid
- Rachel Parsons as Claire Stevens
- Judith Hoag as Patricia Reid
- Roy Souza as Officer Steele
- Adjovi Koene as Valerie
- Celeste Oliva as Cathy
- Ken Cheeseman as Byron
- Cindy Lentol as Client
- Denece Ryland as Proud Mother
- Tom Kemp as Principal Brannigan
- Sarah Cote as Sarah
- Kayla Harrity as Karen
