= The Timber =

2015 film

- Film poster
- Directed by: Anthony O'Brien
- Written by: Steve Allrich; Anthony O'Brien; Colin Ossiander
- Produced by: Scott Einbinder; Patrick Newall
- Starring: James Ransone; Josh Peck; Elisa Lasowski; Mark Caven; William Gaunt
- Cinematography: Phil Parmet
- Edited by: Jake York; Anthony O'Brien
- Music by: Tim Borquez
- Production companies: ANA Media; FAL
- Release date: February 27, 2015
- Running time: 82 minutes
- Country: United States
- Language: English
- Budget: $2.1 million

The Timber is a 2015 American Western thriller film directed by Anthony O'Brien and produced by Scott Einbinder and Patrick Newall. It stars James Ransone, Elisa Lasowski, Mark Caven, William Gaunt, David Bailie, and Josh Peck. The screenplay concerns two brothers who set out to capture or kill their estranged father, who has become violent after his fortunes crashed in the Yukon Gold Rush.

== Plot ==
During the Yukon Gold Rush, brothers Wyatt and Samuel set off to take in their estranged father, Jebediah, who is rumored to have turned violent after the gold mine he was working dried up. Samuel and his family are about to be evicted from their land, and Sheriff Snow suspects Wyatt of a recent murder. Wyatt desires to kill their father, but Samuel insists they take him in alive. Before they can leave, banker Mr. Howell alters the agreement he made with the brothers and insists they take Colonel Rupert Thomas and his cargo with them. The brothers have no choice and reluctantly accept.

They meet a witness, Percival Hawkins, who has had his tongue cut out. The boys theorize their father did this to keep him quiet. Before they can reach the mine, their cart breaks down, and they lose two horses. Left with a single horse, they press forward without the cargo. The mine supervisor turns out to have gone mad, and Thomas assaults him when he finds the expected ore to instead be worthless. Tensions rise as Wyatt accuses Thomas of being sent to kill them.

As they discus religion, Wyatt says he believes himself destined for hell. Samuel suddenly steps in a rope trap, and bandits attack them; Thomas is killed before they drive off the bandits. Overwhelmed, Samuel turns back, though Wyatt says he will not give up. Eventually, Wyatt turns back to find Samuel, only to run into Hawkins, who indicates he knows Samuel's location. Hawkins leads him to a bear cave inhabited by a cannibal. Hawkins dies as he helps the brothers defeat the cannibal.

Out of bullets and armed only with a single knife, the brothers grimly push forward. When they reach Jebediah's camp, they are allowed entrance when they identify themselves. However, they are taken prisoner and pressed into slave labor. A revolt ends in many deaths, and the brothers take Jebediah's lieutenant prisoner in the melee. He leads them to Jebediah, only to be shot and killed by Jebediah's bow. Jebediah takes them prisoner. As Wyatt pleads for Samuel's life, Jebediah says he and Wyatt are the same. Jebediah challenges Wyatt to a knife fight and kills him. Samuel, realizing he can not take in his father, kills him.

Meanwhile, Samuel's wife, with the help of Sheriff Snow, kills several goons led by Howell, who claims to now own her land due to foreclosure. After killing Howell himself, Snow's deputy discovers oil on Samuel's land while digging a grave. Samuel returns home and embraces his wife.

== Cast ==
- James Ransone as Wyatt
- Josh Peck as Samuel
- William Gaunt as Jebediah
- David Bailie as Sheriff Snow
- Attila Árpa as Patrick "The Bear"
- Elisa Lasowski as Lisa
- Mark Caven as Colonel Rupert Thomas
- Shaun O'Hagan as Jim Broadswell
- Julian Glover as George Howell
- Maria Doyle Kennedy as Maggie

== Production ==
Filming took place in the Carpathian Mountains in Romania and at the Media Pro Studios in Bucharest. Peck said the weather reached extreme temperatures, but he and Ransone still volunteered to do additional takes.

== Release ==
The Timber was released in Germany on February 27, 2015. Well Go USA Entertainment released it in North America on October 6, 2015.

== Reception ==
Andy Crump of Paste called the film "a slog lacking in both tempo and urgency".
