= Ken Cheeseman =

American actor (born 1954)

- Born: December 9, 1954 (age 71)
- Other names: Ken Chesman
- Occupation: Actor
- Years active: 1986–present

Ken Cheeseman (born December 9, 1954) is an American film, television and stage actor best known for his appearances on the Law & Order television franchise. Sometimes he is credited as Ken Chesman.

He was an acting professor at Emerson College.

== Filmography ==
=== Film ===
| Year | Title | Role | Notes |
|---|---|---|---|
| 1992 | Housesitter | Marv | |
| 1993 | Malice | Code Blue Operator | |
| 1996 | Big Night | Photographer | Uncredited |
| 1996 | The Crucible | Goat Owner | |
| 1997 | The Matchmaker | Pat | Uncredited |
| 1998 | Next Stop Wonderland | Rick | |
| 1998 | The Proposition | Wayne Fenton | |
| 1999 | In Dreams | Paramedic | |
| 2000 | State and Main | Trooper #2 | |
| 2001 | The Blue Diner | Banker | |
| 2002 | Easy Listening | Drunken Party Guy | |
| 2003 | Mystic River | Dave's Friend in Bar | |
| 2004 | My Brother Jack | Chili Bandler | |
| 2005 | Domino One | Edward Sebleman | |
| 2005 | Meet the Mobsters | Victor | |
| 2005 | Turntable | Pharmacist | |
| 2006 | The Legend of Lucy Keyes | Bud Travers | |
| 2009 | The Invention of Lying | Shouting Man | |
| 2009 | Leaves of Grass | Jimmy Fuller | |
| 2010 | Shutter Island | Doctor | |
| 2010 | Locked In | Director | |
| 2013 | Frank the Bastard | John | |
| 2015 | Joy | Gerhardt | |
| 2016 | Cocktail Party | Mr. Fink | |
| 2017 | Professor Marston and the Wonder Women | Dean Liddy | |
| 2018 | Ghost Light | George Pitard | |
| 2019 | Jungleland | Old Senior | Uncredited |
| 2022 | About Fate | Paul | |

=== Television ===
| Year | Title | Role | Notes |
|---|---|---|---|
| 1986 | A Case of Deadly Force | Ken Kobre | Television film |
| 1988 | Spenser: For Hire | Purse Snatcher | Episode: "Skeletons in the Closet" |
| 1990 | The Kennedys of Massachusetts | Ormsby-Gore | 3 episodes |
| 1990 | Common Ground | Matt | Miniseries |
| 1997 | The Story Shop | Prospero J. Pickwick | 13 episodes |
| 2002 | Monk | Manny | Episode: "Mr. Monk Goes to the Asylum" |
| 2003 | American Experience | Robert Gould Shaw | Episode: "Murder at Harvard" |
| 2003, 2006 | Law & Order: Criminal Intent | Dr. Anthony Clayton / Leo Gergis | 2 episodes |
| 2004 | Law & Order | Jeffrey Bowerman | Episode: "Vendetta" |
| 2005 | Law & Order: Trial by Jury | Patrick | Episode: "Bang & Blame" |
| 2007 | Age Appropriate | Lawrence Vaughn | Television film |
| 2008 | American Masters | Ralph Waldo Emerson | Episode: "Louisa May Alcott: The Woman Behind 'Little Women'" |
| 2010 | The Good Wife | Jury Foreman | Episode: "Double Jeopardy" |
| 2012 | Sexting in Suburbia | Byron | Television film |
| 2014 | Olive Kitteridge | Harmon Newton | 4 episodes |
| 2016 | Time Traveling Bong | Reverend Hale | Episode: "Chapter 1: The Beginning" |
| 2017 | The Spruces and the Pines | Dave Spruce | Television film |
| 2018 | Suspicion | Philbin | Television film |
| 2020 | Defending Jacob | Rod Renborg | Episode: "Job" |

== Theatre credits ==
- Classic Stage Company (2011) The Cherry Orchard as Pischik
- New York Shakespeare Festival (2007) A Midsummer Night's Dream as Starveling
- La MaMa Experimental Theatre Club (2006) King Lear as Fool
- Classic Stage Company (1995) Amphitryon as Sosia
- New York Shakespeare Festival (1993) Measure for Measure as Froth
- Classic Stage Company (1993) Scapin as Sylvestre
