= Stanley Brooks =

American film and television producer

- Education: Brandeis University (BA); American Film Institute (MFA)
- Occupations: Writer, director, producer
- Years active: 1989–present
- Spouse: Tanya Lopez

Stanley M. Brooks is an American film and television producer. He has produced more than 60 productions for film and television as well as several critically acclaimed miniseries including Broken Trail and Prayers for Bobby.

== Career ==
A graduate of Brandeis University, Brooks also holds a master's degree in fine arts from the American Film Institute where he is also currently an adjunct professor.

In the 1980s, Brooks served as president of Guber-Peters Television. Under his leadership, the company produced many notable projects including Barry Levinson's Rain Man, which went on to win the Academy Award for Best Picture at the 1988 Academy Awards. In 1989, Brooke left to found his first independent production company, Once Upon a Time Films, which went on to produce a variety of television movies in the 1990s and 2000s. The company is named after one of his favorite films, Sergio Leone's Once Upon a Time in the West and Once Upon a Time in America. He briefly run Savoy Pictures' television division in 1995.

In 2006, Brooks produced Broken Trail starring Robert Duvall and Thomas Haden Church which won four Emmy Awards including Outstanding Miniseries, Outstanding Lead Actor in a Miniseries, and Outstanding Supporting Actor in a Miniseries and Best Casting for a Miniseries, Movie or Special. It was also nominated for three Golden Globe awards in the categories of Best Picture, Best Actor and Best Supporting Actor.

In 2009, Brooks produced the telefilm Prayers for Bobby, which earned an Emmy nomination for Outstanding Made for Television Movie as well as both Emmy and Golden Globe nominations for Sigourney Weaver's portrayal of Mary Griffith.

Governor Arnold Schwarzenegger appointed Brooks as chairman of the California Film Commission in 2010 where he helped pass the first tax incentives package for the entertainment industry in California history, bringing tens of thousands of jobs back to the state. The company went into bankruptcy in late 2010. After emerging from bankruptcy, Brooks and former Once Upon a Time team members formed Stan & Deliver Films to continue producing television movies. He later set up Happily Ever After Films to keep producing television movies.

== Personal life ==
Brooks founded The Hollywood Indies Little League Foundation, a charitable organization that in 1995 brought Little League baseball back to an abandoned park in South Los Angeles. It is now the city's largest Little League program. The following year, Brooks was recognized by the Los Angeles County Board of Supervisors for his special contribution to the parks and children of L.A.

He is married to Tanya Lopez, a former ICM agent and current head of the original movies division at Lifetime Networks. They have three children together ages 28, 26, and 18.
