= Ryan Kelley =

American actor (born 1986)

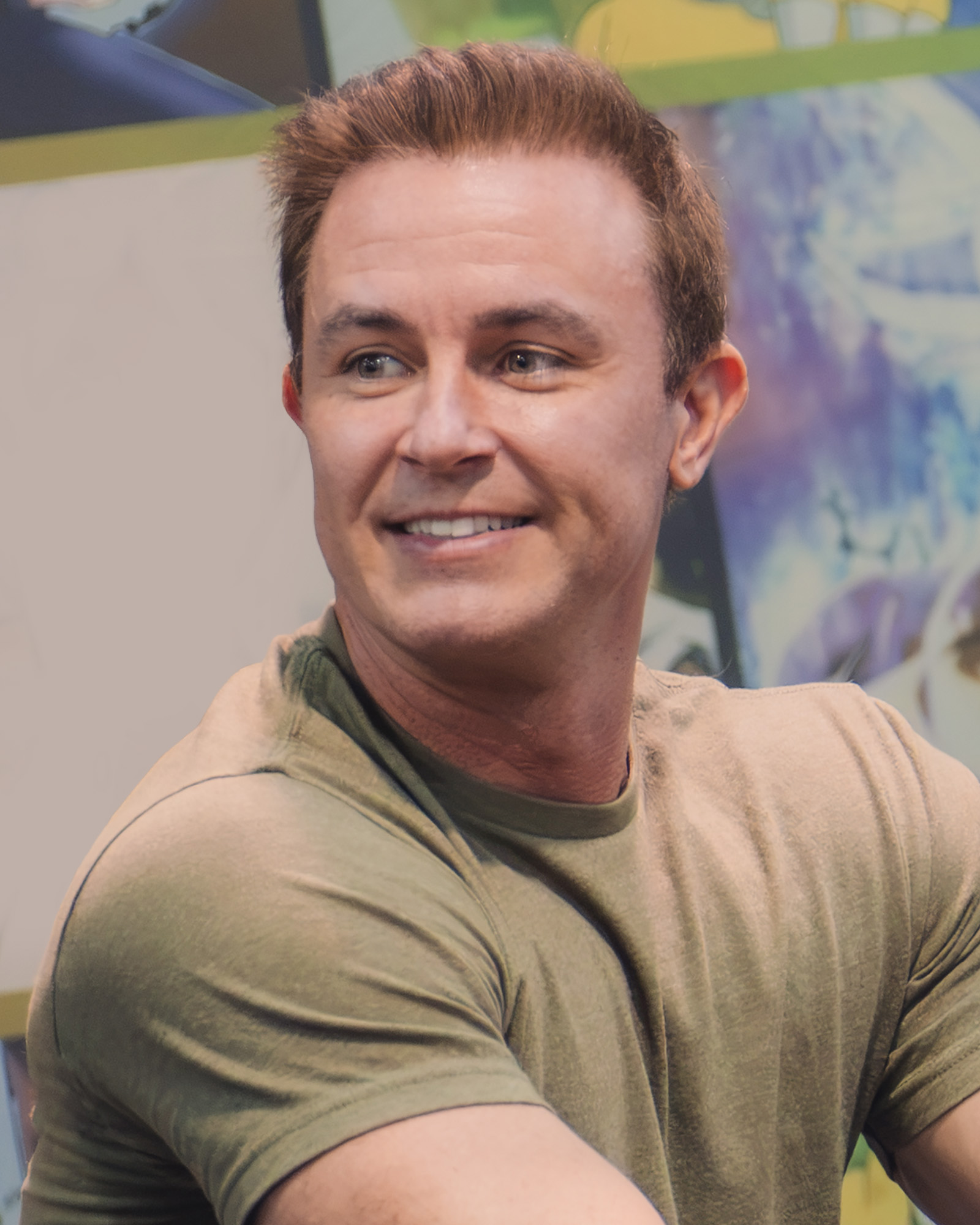
- Kelley in 2026
- Born: Ryan Jonathan Kelley; August 31, 1986 (age 40); Glen Ellyn, Illinois, U.S.
- Occupation: Actor
- Years active: 1995–present

Ryan Jonathan Kelley (born August 31, 1986) is an American actor. He is known for his roles in Mean Creek, Prayers for Bobby, as Ben Tennyson in Ben 10: Alien Swarm, and as Deputy Jordan Parrish on Teen Wolf.

== Early life ==
Kelley was born and raised in Glen Ellyn, a western suburb of Chicago, Illinois. He is the fifth eldest of 15 siblings (nine brothers and six sisters), and was raised as a Lutheran. Ryan Kelley, his father is a British descent and his mother is an Irish and German and Danish and English ancestry.

When he was two, his mother took him and five of his siblings to Chicago to meet an agent since the neighbors next door did the same thing. Kelley started appearing in commercials and gained his first role in a movie when he was in first grade and became a member of SAG at the age of four. He would travel to Los Angeles annually for pilot season and stay at the Oakwood apartments. Due to his being in and out of class, he was homeschooled during his last two years of high school. When he turned 18, he moved to Los Angeles.

== Career ==
In 2002, he had a supporting role in Stolen Summer, which was a film made during Project Greenlight. He also played the role of Ryan James in two episodes of Smallville.

Kelley won an Independent Spirit Award for his performance in Mean Creek in 2004. Also in 2004 he played a lead role in the movie The Dust Factory. In 2006, Kelley appeared in the film Letters from Iwo Jima as a marine. He also played Roy, a great-nephew of Butch Cassidy, in Outlaw Trail: The Treasure of Butch Cassidy.

He played a leading role in the movie Prayers for Bobby alongside Sigourney Weaver, which premiered in January 2009 on Lifetime. The Contra Costa Times called Kelley's portrayal of Bobby Griffith a "stirring performance". In November, he played the role of Ben Tennyson in Ben 10: Alien Swarm. In January 2012, Kelley was in the TV movie Sexting in Suburbia, with Liz Vassey and Jenn Proske. In 2014, Kelley joined the cast of the MTV show Teen Wolf as Jordan Parrish, a young deputy.

In September 2021, it was announced that a reunion film for Teen Wolf had been ordered by Paramount+, with Jeff Davis returning as a screenwriter and executive producer for the film. The majority of the original cast members, including Kelley, reprised their roles. Teen Wolf: The Movie was released on January 26, 2023.

== Filmography ==
=== Film ===
Year	Title	Role	Notes
1995	Roommates	Mo	
1999	Charming Billy	10-year-old Duane	
2002	Stolen Summer	Seamus O'Malley	
2002	Stray Dogs	J. Fred Carter	
2004	Mean Creek	Clyde	
2004	The Dust Factory	Ryan Flynn	
2006	Outlaw Trail: The Treasure of Butch Cassidy	Roy Parker	
2006	Letters from Iwo Jima	Marine #2	
2007	Still Green	Alan	
2015	War Pigs	William York	
2016	Lucifer	Peter Matheson	
2017	Realms	Bobby	
2019	Badland	Jasper Mortenson	
2023	Teen Wolf: The Movie	Jordan Parrish	
TBA	The Promethean	Forsyth	Pre-production; also producer

=== Television ===
Year	Title	Role	Notes
1998	Early Edition	Tom Stone	Episode: "The Quality of Mercy"
2002	Smallville	Ryan James	Guest role; 2 episodes
2005	Boston Legal	Stuart Milch	Episode: "Let Sales Ring"
2008	Cold Case	Curt Fitzpatrick	Episode: "Sabotage"
2008	Terminator: The Sarah Connor Chronicles	Young Derek Reese	Episode: "What He Beheld"
2008	Women's Murder Club	Charlie Gifford	Episode: "And the Truth Will (Sometimes) Set You Free"
2009	Ghost Whisperer	Devin Bancroft	Episode: "Life on the Line"
2009	Prayers for Bobby	Bobby Griffith	Television film
2009	Ben 10: Alien Swarm	Ben Tennyson	Television film
2009	Mending Fences	Chuck Bentley	Television film
2009	Law & Order: SVU	Enzo Cook	Episode: "Users"
2009	Destroy Build Destroy	Himself	Episode: "Ben 10: Alien Swarm vs. Dude, What Would Happen"
2012	Sexting in Suburbia	Mark Carey	Television film
2014–2017	Teen Wolf	Jordan Parrish	Recurring role; 46 episodes
2017	Do I Say I Do	Mike Pryce	Television film
2018	NCIS: Los Angeles	Jesse Smith	Episode: "Warriors of Peace"
2019	A Beauty & The Beast Christmas	Beau Bradley	Television film

=== Web ===
Year	Title	Role	Notes
2013	Twisted Tales	Buddy	Episode: "Bite"

=== Music videos ===
Year	Title	Role	Artist
2017	"Places"	The Love Interest	Xenia Ghali ft. Raquel Castro

== Awards and nominations ==
Year	Award	Category	Work	Result
2005	Independent Spirit Awards	Special Distinction Award	Mean Creek	Won
2007	Fort Lauderdale International Film Festival	Best Ensemble	Still Green	Won
2009	Online Film & Television Association Award	Best Supporting Actor in a Motion Picture or Miniseries	Prayers for Bobby	Nominated
