= NLGJA: The Association of LGBTQ+ Journalists =

American professional association

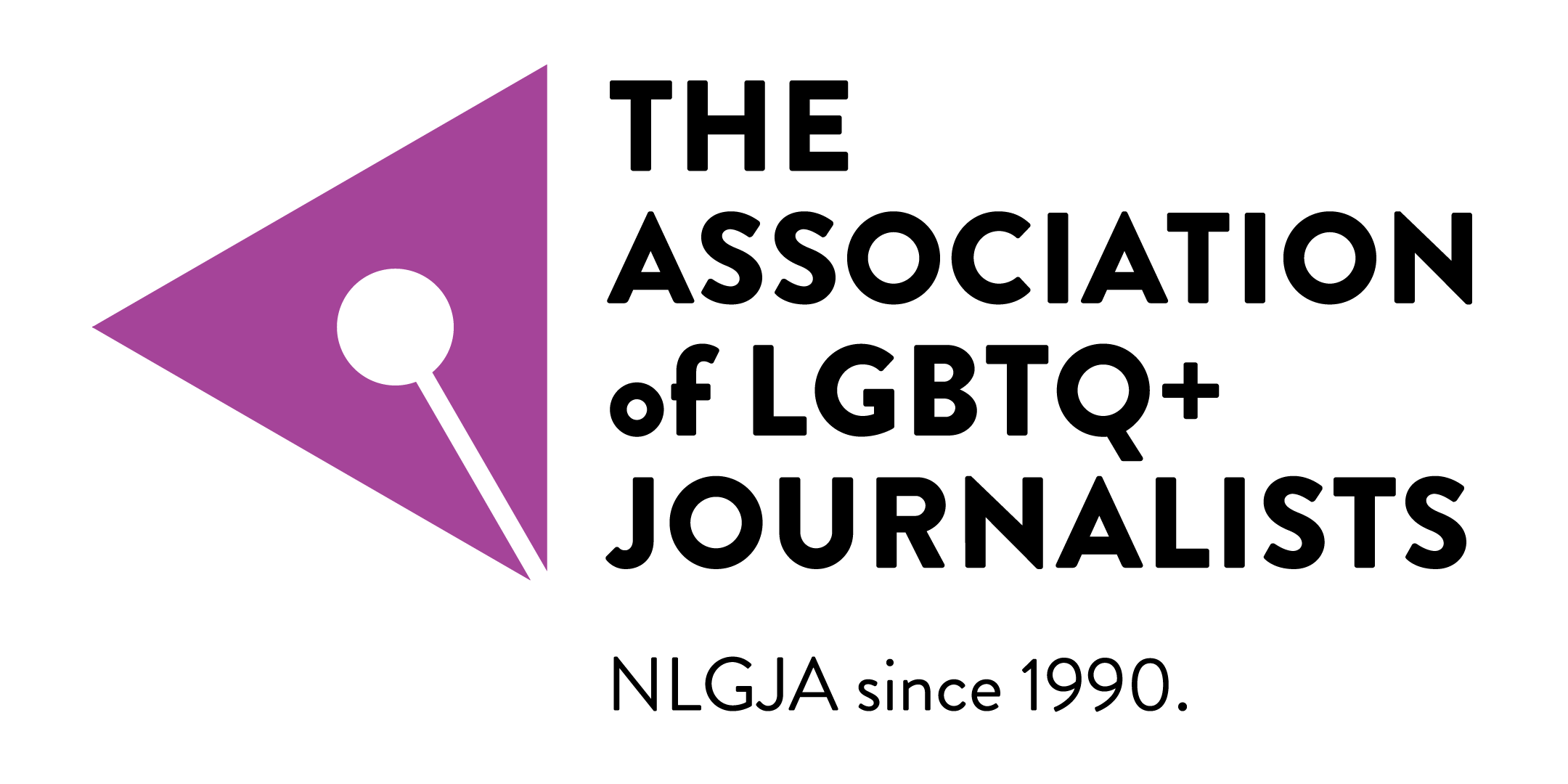
- Logo for NLGJA: The Association of LGBTQ+ Journalists
- Formation: 1990
- Founder: Roy Aarons
- Location: United States
- Services: LGBTQ+ journalism
- Official language: English

NLGJA: The Association of LGBTQ+ Journalists, is an American professional association dedicated to coverage of LGBTQ+ issues in the media. It is based in Washington, D.C., and the membership consists primarily of journalists, students, educators, and communications professionals. The organization was previously known as the National Lesbian and Gay Journalists Association (NLGJA), but changed its name in 2013 to "NLGJA: The Association of LGBT Journalists" to reflect the diversity of the communities it represents. In 2016, it added a "Q" to represent queer journalists and people, updating its name to "NLGJA: The Association of LGBTQ Journalists". In 2023, it added a "+" to represent those gender-diverse and sex-diverse people whose identities are not well-known to be added to the acronym, and those who are questioning their identities, updating its name to "NLGJA: The Association of LGBTQ+ Journalists".

== History ==
The association was founded by Roy Aarons in 1990, along with other journalists, Elaine Herscher, Shannon Hickey, David Tuller, Victor Zonana, and Kathleen Buckley, who made up its first board.

Jen Christensen took over as NLGJA national president following the death of Michael Triplett, who died January 18, 2013, less than six-months after his election.

The association has inspired the founding of the French Association of LGBTI Journalists in 2013.

== Contributions to journalism ==
=== Press service ===
In connection with Witeck-Combs Communications, the NLGJA launched OutNewsWire in 2008 to simplify the distribution of news articles relating to the LGBTQ community. The wire has more than 400 journalists receiving updates currently, which are available online. The service comes at a discounted price to "nonprofits hoping to use the service to reach the LGBTQ media".

== Newsroom Outreach Project ==
As early as 1996, the NLGJA, along with Hollywood Supports, developed "sexual orientation in the workplace" seminars that were conducted in Knight Ridder newspapers across on the nation. The seminars were designed to place emphasis on acceptance in the workplace, through discussions of stereotypes and business and legal issues involved with the LGBTQ community. The stated goal of these seminars was to provide an LGBTQ-friendly office environment for LGBTQ journalists, but the discussions also pushed for domestic partnership benefits at newspapers across the nation, one of the main focuses of the LGBTQ rights movement nationwide. The seminars are offered free of charge to news organizations.

During the seminars, facilitators introduce employees to the "model of parity" NLGJA developed to encourage equality and inclusiveness within the workplace. There are fourteen steps in this model, highlighting both workplace climate and fair compensation. Included in these steps are things like avoiding double standards, promoting balanced coverage, providing the same insurance coverage for all employees, and offering family and medical leave.

== See also ==
- National Gay Newspaper Guild
