= Prayers for Bobby (book) =

Book by Leroy F. Aarons

Prayers for Bobby: A Mother's Coming to Terms with the Suicide of Her Gay Son
- Author: Leroy F. Aarons
- Language: English
- Subject: Biography
- Publisher: HarperCollins
- Publication date: 1995
- Publication place: United States
- Media type: Print
- Pages: 288
- ISBN: 0-06-251123-8
- Dewey Decimal: 305.38/9664/092 20
- LC Class: HQ75.8.G75 A25 1995

Prayers for Bobby: A Mother's Coming to Terms with the Suicide of Her Gay Son is a book by Leroy F. Aarons that outlines a mother's experience in coming to terms with the suicide of her gay son. On January 24, 2009, the TV film Prayers for Bobby, an adaptation of the book starring Sigourney Weaver and Ryan Kelley in the title role as Bobby, was shown on the Lifetime cable network. In 2023, the audiobook for the book was released on Audible, narrated by actor, Wentworth Miller.

== Development ==
In 1989, Leroy Aarons read a newspaper story about a young man's suicide. Particularly striking to him was the mother, Mary Griffith, who had tried throughout her son's adolescence to "pray away" his "gay nature". At age 20, Bobby Griffith jumped to his death from a freeway bridge in Portland, Oregon. Mary was transformed by her loss and eventually renounced the rigid religious beliefs that had kept her from fully accepting Bobby during his lifetime.

The Griffiths' story resonated with Aarons' own transformation as an openly gay journalist and activist. After Bobby's death, his mother became an iconic activist for the national association PFLAG, urging parents to understand and accept their children's homosexuality. "This extraordinary conversion touched me as deeply as the tale of Bobby's tragic death," Aarons wrote. "What enabled her to transcend her background and perform what could only be described as acts of courage."

After leaving daily journalism in 1991, Aarons began to explore the Griffiths' stories in depth. Prayers for Bobby: A Mother's Coming to Terms with the Suicide of Her Gay Son — Aarons' first book — was published by HarperCollins in 1995.

== See also ==
- List of LGBT-related suicides
- Suicide among LGBT youth
