= Prayers for Bobby =

2009 television film directed by Russell Mulcahy

- Promotional poster
- Based on: Prayers for Bobby by Leroy F. Aarons
- Teleplay by: Katie Ford
- Directed by: Russell Mulcahy
- Starring: Sigourney Weaver; Henry Czerny; Ryan Kelley; Austin Nichols; Susan Ruttan; Dan Butler
- Composer: Christopher Ward
- Country of origin: United States
- Original language: English

Production
- Executive producers: Stanley M. Brooks; David Permut; Daniel Sladek; Chris Taaffe
- Producer: Damian Ganczewski
- Cinematography: Thom Best
- Editor: Victor Du Bois
- Running time: 89 minutes
- Production companies: Once Upon a Time Films; Permut Presentations; Sladek/Taaffe Productions

Original release
- Network: Lifetime
- Release: January 24, 2009

Prayers for Bobby is a 2009 American biographical drama television film directed by Russell Mulcahy from a teleplay by Katie Ford, based on the 1995 non-fiction book by Leroy F. Aarons, which is itself based on the true story of the life and legacy of Bobby Griffith, a gay teenager who killed himself in 1983 due to his mother's homophobia. Ryan Kelley stars as Bobby Griffith and Sigourney Weaver portrays his mother Mary.

The film premiered on Lifetime on January 24, 2009, and was watched by over six million viewers during its two-day initial run. It received positive reviews from critics and was nominated for two Primetime Emmy Awards: Outstanding Television Movie and Outstanding Lead Actress in a Limited Series or Movie for Weaver, who was also nominated for a Golden Globe Award, and a Screen Actors Guild Award.

== Plot ==
Mary Griffith is a devout Christian who raises her four children—Ed, Bobby, Joy, and Nancy—according to the evangelical teachings of her local Presbyterian church in Walnut Creek, California, in the late 1970s and early 1980s.

On the day of his grandmother's birthday party, Bobby is uncomfortable when his family makes homophobic jokes and comments. When his sister gives their grandmother a journal but is rebuked, she lets Bobby have it. He often writes in it to vent about his feelings of anxiety and depression. Later, when kissing his girlfriend, Bobby becomes uncomfortable when she suggests having sex and apologetically breaks up with her. He enters a local gay bar but becomes flustered and leaves. On his way out, he sees the local Metropolitan Community Church across the street. When he arrives home, he tells Mary he was at church.

Ed finds Bobby in the aftermath of a suicide attempt with an aspirin overdose. Bobby confides in him that he is gay and begs him not to tell Mary. Ed, out of concern for Bobby, tells Mary anyway, who is shaken but confident that willpower and faith will help Bobby. She takes him to a conversion therapist who treats him coldly and tells Mary and her husband, Robert, that homosexuality is the result of inadequate parenting. She tells Bobby to pray harder, seeks solace in church activities, and advises Mary to arrange bonding between Bobby and Robert. While on a camping trip with Ed and Robert, Bobby explains that he wants to become a writer, which his father dismisses as unrealistic. Desperate for Mary's approval, Bobby does what is asked of him, but, through it all, the homophobia in his environment and church, coupled with Mary's embarrassment of him in public, cause him to grow increasingly withdrawn and depressed.

Bobby's father and siblings slowly become less uncomfortable with his sexuality, but Mary believes God can cure him. He spends time away from his family by going to Portland, Oregon, in the summer to visit his cousin Jeanette, who is accepting of his sexual orientation and tries to help him realize that his mother will never change. She takes him to a gay bar, where he meets a man named David, and the two of them date throughout the summer. David tells Bobby that his parents eventually became accepting of his sexuality and to not give up on trying to win Mary's favor. Despite seeing Bobby's love for David, Mary informs Bobby that she "will not have a gay son". Bobby drops out of high school and moves to Portland. David grows distant from Bobby, which exacerbates his depression and self-loathing. After he sees David leaving the gay bar with another man, he becomes suicidal. Thinking back to his mother's unrepentant homophobia and disownment of him, he free-falls off a bridge onto a highway and into the path of an oncoming eighteen-wheeler, which kills him instantly. His family receives the news the following day and is devastated.

At Bobby's funeral, the priest leading the eulogy disrespects Bobby due to his sexuality, and Jeanette later expresses her disgust with Mary. Mary finds Bobby's journal and begins to read it, learning about the emotions he never shared with her. She becomes depressed and begins to question herself and her church's interpretation of Christian scripture. In search of answers, she becomes acquainted with the reverend of the Metropolitan Community Church that Bobby attended, who challenges her interpretations of scripture and convinces her to attend a meeting of Parents, Families and Friends of Lesbians and Gays (PFLAG). After several months, Mary loses conviction in her former homophobic beliefs and visits the reverend. It is there that she recalls always having felt that Bobby was different from her other children, even from conception, and cries with remorse.

Having accepted her role in Bobby's death, Mary gives a speech at a local city council meeting supporting a local "gay day" live on television. She recounts the struggles she had coping with Bobby coming out of the closet and her stubbornness to reevaluate her religious beliefs, which were nothing more than "bigotry" and "dehumanizing slander". She recognizes that Bobby's kind heart was more important than his sexuality and that his suicide was subsequently due to poor parenting. She concludes her speech by urging people to think before they say, voice, or support religious homophobia because "a child is listening". The measure is rejected, but Mary is undeterred, and the family travels to San Francisco with fellow PFLAG members to walk in the pride parade, during which she sees a young man observing the parade who reminds her of Bobby. She walks over to him, and they embrace. Mary rejoins the parade, committed to fighting for gay rights everywhere.

== Cast ==
- Sigourney Weaver as Mary Griffith
- Henry Czerny as Robert Griffith
- Ryan Kelley as Bobby Griffith
- Austin Nichols as Ed Griffith
- Susan Ruttan as Betty Lambert
- Dan Butler as Reverend Whitsell
- Carly Schroeder as Joy Griffith
- Shannon Eagan as Nancy Griffith
- Scott Bailey as David
- Rebecca Louise Miller as Jeanette
- Lee Garlington as Psychologist
- Madge Levinson as Ophelia
- Marshall McClean as Reverend Owens
- Bryan Endress-Fox as Greg
- Mary Griffith as herself in the Pride Parade scene

== Production ==
Executive producers David Permut, Daniel Sladek, and Chris Taaffe initiated and championed the project over a period of thirteen years. The film was directed by Russell Mulcahy. Screenwriter Katie Ford based the teleplay on the 1995 non-fiction book Prayers for Bobby: A Mother's Coming to Terms with the Suicide of Her Gay Son by Leroy F. Aarons, a journalist who interviewed Mary Griffith about her experiences that led to the suicide of her son as well as her work advocating the rights of the LGBTQ community. Griffith and Aarons are credited as co-producers on the film. Produced by Once Upon a Times Films in association with Permut Presentations and Sladek/Taaffe Productions, the other executive producer was Stanley M. Brooks. The final scene of the film features "Here I Am" by Leona Lewis.

== Reception ==
=== Ratings ===
Prayers for Bobby received 3.8 million total viewers during the film's January 24, 2009, premiere on Lifetime, with 2.3 million total viewers subsequently during the January 25, 2009, airdate with a combined total of 6.1 million viewers.

=== Critical response ===
Critics responded positively to the film, which received approval from 73% of 15 critics and an average rating of 6.4/10 on the review aggregator Rotten Tomatoes. Critics' consensus on the website is "A devastating true story and terrific performance by Sigourney Weaver give Prayers for Bobby palpable power, although some viewers may find this well-intentioned film too calculating in its efforts to wring tears." Brian Lowry of Variety wrote "Sigourney Weaver's TV movie debut proves worth the wait, as Lifetime's fact-based Prayers for Bobby revisits ground similar to that broken nearly 25 years ago by the AIDS-themed "An Early Frost" and – thanks to enduring religious-based bigotry toward gays – still feels fresh and poignant."

=== Accolades ===
Sigourney Weaver was given the Trevor Life Award from The Trevor Project for her participation in the film. The award was presented by Anne Hathaway. In 2015, executive producers Daniel Sladek & Chris Taaffe were invited by the Vice President of the EU to the European Parliament in Brussels where they presented Prayers for Bobby to Members of Parliament on International Homophobia Day.

Year	Award	Category	Recipient(s) and nominee(s)	Result	Ref.
2009	Gold Derby Awards	TV Movie or Miniseries	Prayers for Bobby	Nominated	
2009	Gold Derby Awards	TV movie/Mini Actress	Sigourney Weaver	Nominated	
2009	Primetime Emmy Awards	Outstanding Television Movie	Daniel Sladek, Chris Taaffe, David Permut, Stanley M. Brooks, Damian Ganczewski	Nominated	
2009	Primetime Emmy Awards	Outstanding Lead Actress in a Miniseries or Movie	Sigourney Weaver	Nominated	
2009	Satellite Award	Best Actress – Miniseries or TV Film	Sigourney Weaver	Nominated	
2009	Seattle Gay & Lesbian Film Festival Audience Appreciation Award	Favorite Narrative Film	Prayers for Bobby	Won	
2010	Dorian Awards	LGBT-Themed TV Show of the Year	Prayers for Bobby	Won	
2010	Dorian Awards	TV Performance of the Year: Drama	Sigourney Weaver	Nominated	
2010	GLAAD Media Award	Outstanding TV Movie or Miniseries	Prayers for Bobby	Won	
2010	Golden Globe Award	Best Actress – Miniseries or Television Film	Sigourney Weaver	Nominated	
2010	Producers Guild of America Award	David L. Wolper Award for Outstanding Producer of Long-Form Television	Stanley M. Brooks, David Permut, Daniel Sladek, Chris Taaffe, Damian Ganczewski	Nominated	
2010	Screen Actors Guild Award	Outstanding Performance by a Female Actor in a Miniseries or Television Movie	Sigourney Weaver	Nominated	

== Home media ==
On December 7, 2010, Prayers for Bobby was released on DVD.

== See also ==
- The Matthew Shepard Story
- List of suicides of LGBTQ people
