= Leroy F. Aarons =

American journalist, editor, author, and playwright

Leroy Aarons
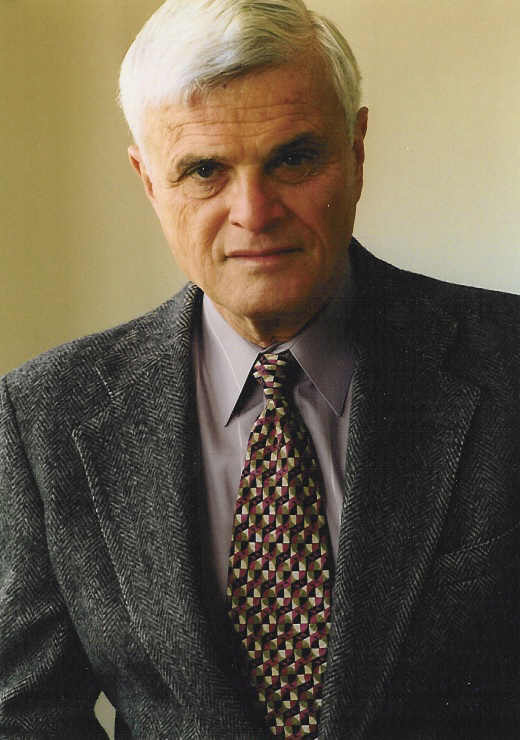

Personal details
- Born: December 8, 1933 The Bronx, New York, United States
- Died: November 28, 2004 (aged 70) Santa Rosa, California, United States
- Domestic partner: Joshua Boneh (1980–2004)
- Education: Brown University; Columbia University Graduate School of Journalism
- Occupation: Journalist, editor, playwright, activist

Leroy "Roy" F. Aarons (December 8, 1933 – November 28, 2004) was an American journalist, editor, playwright, activist, and founder of the National Lesbian and Gay Journalists Association (NLGJA), and founding member of the Maynard Institute for Journalism Education. In 2005 he was inducted into the NLGJA Hall of Fame.

== Early life ==
Born in The Bronx, New York, on December 8, 1933, to Latvian-Jewish immigrant parents,

Aarons graduated from Brown University with a bachelor's degree in psychology in 1955 and earned a master's degree from the Columbia University Graduate School of Journalism. He served in the Navy and Navy Reserve, attaining the rank of lieutenant. He was a copy editor at The New Haven Journal-Courier.

== Career ==
=== The Washington Post ===
Aarons worked at The Washington Post for 14 years. As an editor and a national correspondent, he served as New York bureau chief and later established the paper's first Los Angeles bureau. He was with the paper from 1962 to 1976, covering major events of the 1960s and 1970s.

As Los Angeles bureau chief when the Pentagon Papers story surfaced, he covered California-related events in the case, including the work Daniel Ellsberg had been doing for the RAND Corporation and how he removed the papers from its headquarters.

The Post broke the Watergate scandal story, and because of his role at the paper during the time, Aarons was hired for a small role in the film All the President's Men.

In 1991 Aarons revisited the Pentagon Papers case, co-authoring the docudrama Top Secret: The Battle for the Pentagon Papers with Geoffrey Cowan. That year it aired on National Public Radio, performed by Ed Asner and Marsha Mason. The play won the Corporation for Public Broadcasting's 1992 Gold and Silver awards for best live entertainment. Top Secret has toured nationwide as a production of L.A. Theatre Works.

=== MIJE and Oakland Tribune ===
In the 1970s, Robert C. Maynard had been working on a summer program for minority journalists at Columbia University, and he asked Aarons to join its faculty. He joined in 1976, when the program moved to the University of California, Berkeley, as the Summer Program for Minority Journalists. It later became the Robert C. Maynard Institute for Journalism Education (MIJE).

Urged by Maynard, Aarons joined the Oakland Tribune in 1983. Maynard had purchased the declining Tribune and recruited Aarons to be its features editor.

At the Tribune, Aarons rose to executive editor and then to senior vice president for news. He led his team to a 1990 Pulitzer Prize for Spot News Photography of the 1989 Loma Prieta earthquake. The following year he retired from journalism.

=== LGBT activism ===
In 1985, Aarons started We the People - The Voice North Bay's LGBT Community, which was a monthly newspaper for 27 years.

In 1989 the American Society of News Editors (ASNE) asked Aarons to coordinate a survey of gay and lesbian journalists. Responses from 205 print journalists revealed that many were closeted in their newsrooms. An overwhelming majority said coverage of gay issues was "mediocre." Fewer than 60 percent had told colleagues about their sexual orientation; fewer than 7 percent said their work environments were good for gay people. At ASNE's national convention in 1990, Aarons presented the results and closed his speech by coming out. Four months after his speech, Aarons convened six journalists in his California dining room to launch the National Lesbian and Gay Journalists Association (NLGJA). He was its president until 1997, and remained on the board until his death.

Aarons, joined the faculty of the University of Southern California in 1999. While teaching there, he also successfully persuaded the Accrediting Council for Education in Journalism and Mass Communication (ACEJMC) to add sexual orientation content in its curriculum diversity standard. In 1999, as a visiting professor of journalism at the USC Annenberg School for Communication, he founded and directed its Sexual Orientation Issues in the News program.

In fall 2003, Aarons, Dane S. Claussen, David L. Adams, Amy Falkner, Rhonda Gibson, and others relaunched the then-GLBT Interest Group of the Association for Education in Journalism and Mass Communication (AEJMC). Aarons asked Claussen to serve as the first Head, but he could not because he already was to be 2003-4 Head of AEJMC's Mass Communication & Society Division. David Adams and Sue Lafky served as the first Co-Heads, with Claussen as Vice-Head/Program Chair and Aarons as Secretary.

The AEJMC LGBTQ Interest Group's Teaching Committee also awards, generally every two years, its Leroy F. Aarons Award for lifetime contributions to teaching and/or research related to the LGBTQ communities. On its 15th anniversary in 2006, NLGJA established the annual Leroy F. Aarons Scholarship Award for a lesbian, gay, bisexual or transgender student pursuing a journalism career. CNN provided an inaugural gift of $100,000 to fund the scholarship.

=== Opera ===
In the last decade of his career, Aarons turned to opera, writing the libretto for Monticello. Composed by Glenn Paxton, Monticello portrays the relationship between Thomas Jefferson and Sally Hemings. L.A. Theatre Works produced the original work in 2000.

After the September 11 attacks, Aarons wrote the libretto for Sara's Diary, 9/11, a song cycle also composed by Glenn Paxton. It is a fictional account of a pregnant woman, who, after her husband dies in the attacks, experiences deeply mixed emotions. It premiered at the Spreckels Performing Arts Center on September 8, 2003.

=== Prayers for Bobby ===
In 1989 Aarons read a newspaper article about the suicide of a young gay man, Bobby Griffith, and its effects on his mother. After he left daily journalism in 1991, he researched the story in depth. The result was his first book, published by HarperCollins in 1995, Prayers for Bobby: A Mother's Coming to Terms with the Suicide of Her Gay Son.

The Lifetime television film Prayers for Bobby premiered on January 24, 2009, starring Sigourney Weaver in her first made-for-television film.

== Personal life and death ==
In 1981, Aarons met Israeli computer consultant Joshua Boneh at a Jewish Community Center in Washington, D.C. He followed Boneh to Israel in 1982 where he covered the Lebanon War for Time. The two celebrated their 20th anniversary with a commitment ceremony at the same JCC where they met. They were together until Aarons' death in 2004.

On November 28, 2004, Aarons died of cancer in Santa Rosa, California. He was 70 years old. At the time of his death, Aarons was working on another play, Night Nurse, about South Africa's Truth and Reconciliation Commission, for which he and Boneh had spent a month in South Africa doing research.
