= Josh Peck =

American actor and comedian (born 1986)

- Peck in 2026
- Born: Joshua Michael Peck; November 10, 1986 (age 40); New York City, U.S.
- Occupations: Actor; comedian; YouTuber
- Years active: 1996–present
- Spouse: Paige O'Brien (m. 2017)
- Children: 3

YouTube information
- Channel: Josh Peck
- Years active: 2017–present
- Genres: Comedy; vlog
- Subscribers: 3.39 million
- Views: 392 million
- Last updated: April 19, 2026

Joshua Michael Peck (born November 10, 1986) is an American actor, comedian, and YouTuber. Peck began his career as a child actor, appearing in the film Snow Day (2000) and the Nickelodeon sketch comedy series The Amanda Show (2000–2002). He had his breakthrough playing Josh Nichols on the Nickelodeon sitcom Drake & Josh (2004–2007) and the television films Drake & Josh Go Hollywood (2006) and Merry Christmas, Drake & Josh (2008). He also voiced Eddie in the Ice Age franchise (2006–present).

Peck's film roles include Max Keeble's Big Move (2001), Spun (2002), Drillbit Taylor (2008), What Goes Up (2009), Red Dawn (2012), The Timber (2015), Chronically Metropolitan (2016), and Christopher Nolan's biographical epic Oppenheimer (2023). He voiced Casey Jones in the Nickelodeon animated series Teenage Mutant Ninja Turtles (2012–2017), starred in the Fox comedy series Grandfathered (2015–2016) and the Disney+ series Turner & Hooch (2021). He has run the comedic lifestyle YouTube channel Shua Vlogs since 2017.

== Early life ==
Joshua Michael Peck was born on November 10, 1986, in New York City. He grew up with his mother, Barbara Peck, who is a career coach, and his maternal grandmother. Peck has never publicly identified his father, who was a married co-worker of his mother, and Peck's birth was the result of an extramarital affair. He never met his father, who died in 2013. Peck is Jewish, as are both his parents. He grew up in Hell's Kitchen, Manhattan, and attended P.S. 40 and The Professional Performing Arts School. He had a bar mitzvah ceremony. He had asthma during his childhood, and often stayed indoors watching old sitcoms. He was inspired to become involved in comedy when he was eight years old.

== Career ==
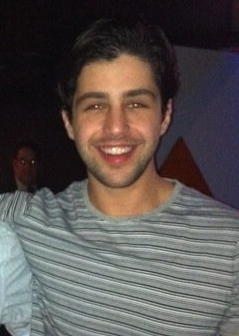
Peck in 2010

Peck subsequently appeared at TADA! Youth Theater and performed stand-up comedy at Carolines on Broadway for the Audrey Hepburn Foundation. He appeared on The Rosie O'Donnell Show at the age of 10 in 1996. At the age of 13, he was offered a role on Nickelodeon's The Amanda Show and, at his mother's suggestion, accepted the part and moved to Los Angeles to further pursue an acting career. Peck made his film début in Snow Day (2000), and appeared regularly on The Amanda Show until the end of its run in 2002. He also starred opposite Alex D. Linz and Zena Grey in the theatrical film, Max Keeble's Big Move, which was released on October 5, 2001. In 2001, he guest starred in an episode of the NBC drama ER called "Thy Will Be Done". During this period, Peck appeared in several independent films, including Spun and 2004's Mean Creek, for which he received critical praise.

Peck was cast as Josh Nichols, opposite Drake Bell's Drake Parker, in another Nickelodeon sitcom, Drake & Josh, which began airing in 2004 and gained Peck recognition among young audiences. Peck's character, Josh Nichols, was smart, funny, and organized, but was always being tormented along with Drake by Megan Parker (Miranda Cosgrove), Drake's younger sister. Both characters sing in a remake of the song "Soul Man" by Sam and Dave. In 2006, Bell and Peck starred in their own TV movie called Drake & Josh Go Hollywood, and in 2007, they starred in a sequel called Drake & Josh: Really Big Shrimp. Josh was nominated for Favorite Television Actor at the 2008 Nickelodeon Kids' Choice Awards for his work on Drake & Josh. Peck also made his début as a director in the Drake & Josh episode, "Battle of Panthatar". He also directed his co-star Drake Bell's music video for the theme song to Drake & Josh, "Found a Way". He has also appeared in the series finale of What's New, Scooby-Doo?, an episode of Codename: Kids Next Door called "Operation: C.A.K.E.D.-F.I.V.E.", and the direct-to-video New Line Cinema film Havoc. Peck returned to the character of Josh Nichols in 2008 for the television film Merry Christmas, Drake & Josh.

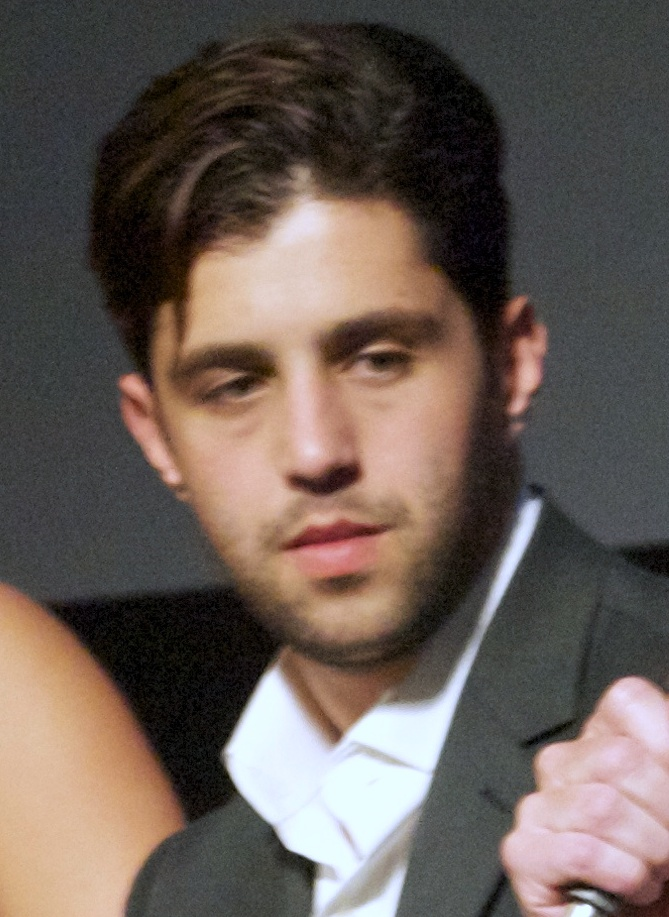
Peck in 2012

In 2006, Peck appeared in the independent film Special, which premiered at the Sundance Film Festival, and voiced Eddie, one of two possum brothers, in the animated sequel, Ice Age: The Meltdown, which was released on March 31 of that year. Peck played a high school bully in 2008's Drillbit Taylor, and starred in the films The Wackness (released July 2008), American Primitive, Safety Glass, and reprised his role as Eddie in Ice Age: Dawn of the Dinosaurs. In 2011, Peck had a cameo role on the hit Nickelodeon show Victorious as an audience member for a play Jade wrote. In 2012, Peck starred in the remake of Red Dawn, and once again reprised his role as Eddie, in Ice Age: Continental Drift. In 2013, he began voicing Casey Jones in Nickelodeon's Teenage Mutant Ninja Turtles.

In 2014, Peck appeared as Danny Norwood in the pilot of The Rebels, one of Amazon Studios' five adult test pilots released on Amazon Video in early 2014. In 2015, Peck was cast as a lead in the comedy series, Grandfathered, starring alongside John Stamos. Grandfathered premiered on September 29 and has gained generally favorable reviews from Rotten Tomatoes and Metacritic. Both Peck and Stamos are nominated for a 2016 People's Choice Award in the category "Favorite Actor In A New TV Series". However it was canceled after one season. In 2016, Peck was cast as Ross in the FOX series Pitch. He appeared in 2 episodes as a statistics analyst. The series was cancelled after 10 episodes.

Peck made several features on David Dobrik's vlog, becoming a frequent contributor to "The Vlog Squad", before pursuing his own YouTube channel. Peck is an active Influencer on Instagram, YouTube and TikTok with 10.3m, 3.76m and 1.9m followers respectively. Peck has co-hosted the "Good Guys" podcast with instagram comedian Ben Soffer since 2022, and has a podcast called "Curious with Josh Peck" produced by Ramble, where he interviews celebrities such as John Stamos and Bob Saget discussing not only current topics but their personal lives.

In February 2020, it was announced that Peck had been cast in the title role as U.S. Marshal Scott Turner II in the sequel series of Turner & Hooch on Disney+. The series premiered in July 2021, and after one season was canceled that December. During August 2021, Peck joined the cast of How I Met Your Father as Drew, an elementary school vice principal. The series premiered on Hulu on January 18, 2022. He appears in two episodes of the second season of the iCarly revival, debuting in "iBuild a Team". In March 2022, HarperOne released his memoir titled Happy People Are Annoying. During 2023, Peck played Kenneth Bainbridge in Christopher Nolan's Oppenheimer. In 2026, Peck appeared as Senator Ashford in the second season of the Amazon Prime Video series Cross. Also in 2026, Peck began hosting Food Network show Sweet Deceit, where teams attempt to detect items that are really cake.

== Personal life ==
In the third season of Drake & Josh, from the episode "The Drake and Josh Inn" and onward, Peck was noticeably thinner. He said: "I made a conscious effort to lose weight because I knew I could be happier as well as being healthier. I started by going on a diet a year and a half ago and I got a personal trainer, but I definitely have a healthier lifestyle now. Also I feel that because I do so much television, I am a better role model. I don't really understand why I should be a role model, but I know that kids do look up to me, so it is my responsibility to motivate people and be inspiring. I hope that I can do that for kids. It doesn't really matter what you look like though." During the same time period, he had substance use issues involving alcohol and drugs.

In June 2017, Peck married his longtime girlfriend, Paige O'Brien. In August 2018, the couple announced they were expecting their first child. Their first son was born December 29 of that year. On October 13, 2022, they welcomed their second son. On July 2, 2025, they announced via Instagram that they had welcomed their third son.

Peck has named Ben Kingsley as his favorite actor, stating "Nobody is as good as him in my opinion".

In 2022, Peck revealed that he had struggled with addictions to alcohol and drugs in the past, stating, "I was always looking for something to fix my insides. But eventually I realized that whether my life was beyond my wildest dreams or a total mess, it didn't change the temperature of what was going on in my mind. I knew that nothing in the outside world would make me feel whole. . . . I used food and drugs to numb my feelings." He has been sober since 2008.

== Filmography ==
Key
†	Denotes films that have not yet been released

=== Film ===
Year	Film	Role	Notes
2000	The Newcomers	Slim	
2000	Snow Day	Wayne Alworth	
2001	Max Keeble's Big Move	Robert "Robe"	
2002	Spun	Fat Boy	
2004	Mean Creek	George Tooney	
2005	Havoc	Josh Rubin	
2006	Special	Joey	
2006	Ice Age: The Meltdown	Eddie	Voice role
2008	The Wackness	Luke Shapiro	
2008	Drillbit Taylor	Ronnie	
2009	Wild About Harry	Spoke White	
2009	What Goes Up	Jim Lement	
2009	Ice Age: Dawn of the Dinosaurs	Eddie	Voice role
2009	Aliens in the Attic	Sparks	Voice role
2012	ATM	Corey Thompson	
2012	Ice Age: Continental Drift	Eddie	Voice role
2012	Red Dawn	Matt Eckert	
2013	Battle of the Year	Franklyn	
2015	The Wedding Ringer	Bad Best Man	
2015	Danny Collins	Nicky Ernst	
2015	The Timber	Samuel	
2016	The Angry Birds Movie	Minion Pig 2	Voice role
2016	Ice Age: Collision Course	Eddie	Voice role
2016	Chronically Metropolitan	John	
2017	Take the 10	Chris	
2017	Gnome Alone	Liam	Voice role
2018	Locating Silver Lake	Daniel	
2019	Fantastica: A Boonie Bears Adventure	Bramble	Voice role; English dub
2021	Doors	Vince	
2022	13	Rabbi Shapiro	
2023	Oppenheimer	Kenneth Bainbridge	
2024	Summer Camp	Jimmy	

=== Television ===
Year	Title	Role	Notes
2000	All That	Himself	Episode: "The cast from Snow Day/Hoku"
2000	Double Dare 2000	Himself	Episode: "Snow Day vs. The Amanda Show"
2000–2002	The Amanda Show	Various characters	Series regular
2001	ER	Nick Stevens	Episode: "Thy Will Be Done"
2001	Family Guy	Charlie	Voice role (uncredited); Episode: "The Kiss Seen Around the World"
2001	Samurai Jack	S Kid / Pig No. 3 / Alien Kid	Voice; Episode: "Aku's Fairy Tales"
2002	Whatever Happened to Robot Jones?	Lenny	Voice role (5 episodes)
2002	MADtv	Jeffrey Lugz	1 episode
2002	Fillmore!	Randall Julian	Voice role; episode: "To Mar a Stall"
2003–2004	The Guardian	Chris Rapp	2 episodes
2004–2007	Drake & Josh	Josh Nichols	Lead role
2005	All That	Himself	Episode: "Nickelodeon's All That 10th Anniversary Reunion Special"
2006	Codename: Kids Next Door	Numbuh 50 Million B.C.	Voice role; Episode: "Operation: C.A.K.E.D.-F.I.V.E."
2006	What's New, Scooby-Doo?	Damian / Kid / Zombie Kid No. 2	Voice roles, episode: "E-Scream"
2006	Drake & Josh Go Hollywood	Josh Nichols	Nickelodeon television film
2008	Merry Christmas, Drake & Josh	Josh Nichols	Nickelodeon Christmas special film
2009	iCarly	Jimmy	Uncredited; episode: "iReunite with Missy"
2011	Victorious	Audience Member, Josh Nichols	Episode: "Wok Star" Uncredited: "Who Did It to Trina" (via archive footage of "I Love Sushi" in Drake and Josh)
2011	Ice Age: A Mammoth Christmas	Eddie	TV special; voice role
2013–2017	Teenage Mutant Ninja Turtles	Casey Jones	Voice
2013–2014	The Mindy Project	Ray Ron	3 episodes
2014	The Big Bang Theory	Jesse	Episode: "The Occupation Recalibration"
2014	The Rebels	Danny Norwood	Episode: "Pilot"
2015–2016	Grandfathered	Gerald	Main role
2015	Teen Choice Awards	Himself	Host
2016	Pitch	Ross	2 episodes
2016	Ice Age: The Great Egg-Scapade	Eddie	TV special; voice role
2016	Lip Sync Battle	Himself	Episode: "Josh Peck vs. Christina Milian"
2018–2020	Fuller House	Ben	2 episodes
2018	Best.Worst.Weekend.Ever.	Himself	Cameo
2021	Turner & Hooch	Scott Turner	Main role
2021	Robot Chicken	Josh Nichols	Voice role; episode: "May Cause Immaculate Conception"
2022–2023	How I Met Your Father	Drew	13 episodes
2022–2023	iCarly	Paul	5 episodes
2025	The Last of Us	Janowicz	Episode: "Day One"
2026	Sweet Deceit	Himself	Host
2026	Cross	Senator Pete Ashford	3 episodes

=== Video games ===
Year	Title	Role	Notes
2006	Ice Age 2: The Meltdown	Eddie	
2007	Drake & Josh	Josh Nichols	Character design
2007	Drake & Josh: Talent Showdown	Josh Nichols	Character design
2009	Ice Age: Dawn of the Dinosaurs	Eddie	
2012	Ice Age: Continental Drift – Arctic Games	Eddie	Mobile game
2014	Teenage Mutant Ninja Turtles: Danger of the Ooze	Casey Jones	
2016	Ice Age: Arctic Blast	Eddie	

== Awards and nominations ==
Year	Award	Category	Work	Result
2005	Independent Spirit Awards	Special Distinction Award	Mean Creek (shared with ensemble)	Won
2008	2008 Kids' Choice Awards	Favorite TV Actor	Drake & Josh	Nominated
2008	2008 UK Kids' Choice Awards	Favorite Male TV Star	Drake & Josh	Won
2013	Behind the Voice Actors Award	Best Vocal Ensemble in a Feature Film	Ice Age: Continental Drift	Nominated
2014	Behind the Voice Actors Award	Best Vocal Ensemble in a Television Series – Action/Drama	Teenage Mutant Ninja Turtles	Nominated
2015	Teen Choice Awards	Choice Web Star: Comedy	Himself	Nominated
2015	Teen Choice Awards	Choice Viner	Himself	Nominated
2015	Behind the Voice Actors Award	Best Vocal Ensemble in a Television Series – Action/Drama	Teenage Mutant Ninja Turtles	Nominated
2016	People's Choice Awards	Favorite Actor in a New TV Series	Grandfathered	Nominated
2016	Teen Choice Awards	Choice Viner	Himself	Nominated
