= Jenn Proske =

Canadian-American actress (born 1987)

- Born: Jennifer Proske; August 8, 1987 (age 39); Toronto, Ontario, Canada
- Education: Boston University (BFA)
- Years active: 2008–2014; 2022–present
- Spouse: Stephen Schneider (m. 2013)
- Children: 1
- Website: jennproske.com

Jennifer Proske (born August 8, 1987) is a Canadian American actress, best known for portraying Becca Crane in the film Vampires Suck (2010).

== Early life ==
Jenn Proske was born in Toronto, Ontario, Canada, to an American ex-professional dancer and a Canadian advertising creative director born in Slovenia, who owns a sandwich shop. She has a younger sister named Becca. Her family moved to Orange County, California when she was four. There she became involved in stage shows for children: at six, she portrayed Ticklish the Dwarf in a new version of Snow White. She kept on acting while attending Tesoro High School. She spent six months in Australia studying and working at the Sydney Theatre Company, led by Cate Blanchett and Andrew Upton. In May 2009 she graduated cum laude in Acting and Theatre Arts from the Boston University College of Fine Arts. Then, she left her job as a floral designer at the Saint Regis resort of Orange County and moved to Los Angeles to become an actress.

== Career ==
After acting in several shows while in high school and college, Proske was hired for her first professional role in Steel Magnolias by Robert Harling, in 2008. She portrayed Shelby. In 2009, she portrayed Titania and Hippolyta in A Midsummer Night's Dream at Mysterium Theater of Santa Ana and had the role of Mariah in an Off-Broadway production of Pope Joan.

She was hired for her first movie role in 2010, as Becca Crane — a parody of Bella Swan from the Twilight saga — in Vampires Suck. She had originally been called for the role of Iris, the parody of Alice Cullen. Vampires Suck received almost universally negative reviews, but Proske's performance was praised by several critics.

In 2011 she joined the short film The Infamous Exploits of Jack West and the pilot of the TV series Home Game, which was never broadcast. In November, she was Serena, the raped daughter of a senator, in the eight and ninth episodes of the eighth season of CSI: NY.

In 2012, she was hired for the roles of Beth in the TV series House of Lies, of Dina Van Cleve in the TV movie Sexting in Suburbia, directed by John Stimpson, and of Meghan Weller, a stage actress set up to be raped, in the episode Theatre Tricks of the thirteenth season of Law & Order: SVU. She also portrayed Amanda Martino in the second episode of Major Crimes. In August, she filmed the fourth episode of The CW series Beauty & the Beast.

In 2013, Proske portrayed Abby, an East Coast girl who falls in love with FBI Special Agent Mike Warren (Aaron Tveit), in the TV series Graceland.

== Personal life ==
In 2012, Proske became engaged to actor Stephen Schneider. The wedding took place on May 26, 2013. On March 28, 2015, Proske gave birth to a daughter, Ava Morata Schneider. Proske converted to Judaism.

== Filmography ==
=== Film ===
| Year | Title | Role | Notes |
|---|---|---|---|
| 2010 | Vampires Suck | Becca Crane | |
| 2011 | The Infamous Exploits of Jack West | Cambria West | Short film |
| 2022 | Ambulance | Lindsey's Mom | |

=== Television ===
| Year | Title | Role | Notes |
|---|---|---|---|
| 2011 | Home Game | Tess | Unaired television pilot |
| 2011 | CSI: NY | Serena Matthews | Guest role; 2 episodes |
| 2012 | House of Lies | Beth | Episode: "Veritas" |
| 2012 | Law & Order: Special Victims Unit | Meghan Weller | Episode: "Theatre Tricks" |
| 2012 | Sexting in Suburbia | Dina Van Cleve | Television film |
| 2012 | Major Crimes | Amanda Martino | Episode: "Before and After" |
| 2012 | Beauty & the Beast | Clarissa Withworth | Episode: "Basic Instinct" |
| 2013 | Graceland | Abby | Recurring role; 6 episodes |
| 2014 | Rizzoli & Isles | Lily Green | Episode: "...Goodbye" |
| 2014 | Cristela | Cheri | Episode: "Hall-Oates-Ween" |

== Theatre ==
Theatre
| Year | Title | Role | Theatre |
|---|---|---|---|
| 2003 | Stage Door | Terry Randall | Tesoro High School theatre |
| 2004 | Much Ado About Nothing | Beatrice | Tesoro High School theatre |
| - | Aurora Borealis | Choreographer, dancer | Boston University theatre |
| - | In This Body | Lead Ensemble | Piven Theatre, Chicago |
| 2008 | Lizzie Stranton | Gertrude | Boston University theatre |
| 2008 | Steel Magnolias | Shelby | Huntington Beach Playhouse |
| 2009 | A Midsummer Night's Dream | The Girl | Mysterium Theater, Santa Ana |
| 2009 | Pope Joan | Mariah | Off-Broadway |

== Awards ==
| Year | Award | Category | Work | Result |
|---|---|---|---|---|
| 2010 | Beverly Hills Film and TV Festival | Best New Actress | Vampires Suck | Won |
