= List of programs broadcast by Nickelodeon Games and Sports for Kids =

The following is a list of programming carried by the defunct American digital cable network Nickelodeon Games and Sports for Kids (shortened to Nick GaS), which aired from March 1, 1999, to December 31, 2007, when it was replaced on most systems by a 24-hour version of The N.

== Former programming ==
- Nick Arcade (1999–2007)
- Double Dare (1999–2004)
- Figure It Out (1999–2007)
- Nickelodeon GUTS (1999–2007)
- Think Fast (1999–2004)
- Family Double Dare (1999–2005)
- Fun House (1999-2002)
- Super Sloppy Double Dare (1999–2005)
- What Would You Do? (1999–2005)
- Get the Picture (1999–2007)
- Legends of the Hidden Temple (1999–2007)
- Wild & Crazy Kids (1999–2005)
- You're On! (1999–2004)
- Finders Keepers (1999–2006)
- Global GUTS (1999–2005)
- SK8-TV (1999–2005)
- Super Special Double Dare (1999–2002)
- Make the Grade (2000–2004)
- Splash TV (2002–2004)
- Double Dare 2000 (2002–2007)
- Nickelodeon Robot Wars (2003–2005)
- Gamefarm (2003–2004)
- Play 2 Z (2003–2004)
- Scaredy Camp (2003–2005)
- Salute Your Shorts (2003–2004)
- Speed Racer X (2004–2005)
