= Nickelodeon All-Star Challenge =

1994 game show television special

- Genre: Game show
- Presented by: Mike O'Malley; Phil Moore; Robin Marrella; Olmec
- Narrated by: Dee Bradley Baker

Production
- Production locations: Universal Studios; Orlando, Florida
- Running time: 30 Minutes (3 parts)

Original release
- Network: Nickelodeon
- Release: October 3, 1994

Nickelodeon All-Star Challenge is a three-episode game show television special that aired during The Big Help on October 3, 1994.

The hosts of the special were Guts' Mike O'Malley, Double Dare and What Would You Do?'s Robin Marrella, who also served as referee, and Nick Arcade's Phil Moore, who also represented Double Dare due to his hosting the now-defunct traveling live show at the time. Representing Legends of the Hidden Temple was the character of "Olmec," voiced by Dee Bradley Baker.

USA Today described the show as merging "the best games from GUTS, Double Dare, Legends of the Hidden Temple and What Would You Do? into one big show." The show additionally combined all-star players from its contemporaneously airing game shows Legends of the Hidden Temple and Guts with celebrities for fun.

== Teams ==
Team Color	Celebrity Captain	GUTS Champion	LOTHT Champion	Rank
Blue	Adam Wylie	Jen Gabel	Ty Mathen	Eliminated
Yellow	Joanna Garcia	Mike Schmidt	Joel Davis	Eliminated in tiebreaker
Pink	Jeremy Jackson	Trecia Swanston	Tony DeViva	Co-runners-up
Red	Michael Fishman	Chris Ewing	Olivia-Emma Houliana	Winners
Green	Nicholle Tom	Bryan Beer	Jamie Davis	Eliminated
Purple	Christopher Castile	Chris Yon	Jennifer Groze	Co-runners-up

== Rules ==
Six teams of three players competed. As mentioned above, these teams consisted of "all-star" players (those who either won the bonus round on "Legends", or those who won a gold medal on "GUTS"), joined by a celebrity partner:

Celebrity Partner	Show
Adam Wylie	Picket Fences
Joanna Garcia	Are You Afraid of the Dark?
Jeremy Jackson	Baywatch
Michael Fishman	Roseanne
Nicholle Tom	The Nanny
Christopher Castile	Step by Step

The structure for the show was as follows: six teams compete for the first two shows; the winning teams plus one wildcard based on score (which was determined by a tiebreaker question with the loser hitting themselves with a pie) competed on the final episode to determine a winner.

== Round 1 ==
This was the "Action Round", featuring stunts from the shows featured. The events played were:

=== Guts ===
Slam Dunk: Players jumped off the Aerial Bridge and attempted to shoot a basketball through an elevated basketball hoop with each jump. Baskets only counted if they were made after the player touched the ground. All three players competed at the same time, and the player with the most baskets scored in 60 seconds won.

Dodge It: This event was modeled after the game of dodgeball. The players were in three corners as they bounced up and down constantly with the help of the elastics. As dodgeballs poured out of an elevated tube, players attempted to catch a ball and hit one of their opponents with it. Players were allowed to catch a dodgeball thrown at them (though it would still count as a hit against that player) and use it against the player that threw it, or against another player. The player who scored the most hits against their opponents in 60 seconds was the winner.

Slam-A-Jama: Each player had 30 seconds to score baskets in a hoop inside of a center cylinder while the other players tried to reject the shots. After one player has had their turn, he or she then went on defense against the next player. The player with the most hoops scored won. Players on defense could not grab onto the basket while they tried to defend against a player on offense; if they did grab onto the basket, they would lose a point that they scored on offense.

=== Legends ===
Warrior Games: Four targets were set up on a platform. The players had a minute to load up slingshots and launch balls at the targets, trying to knock them down. The first team to do so, or the one who knocked down the most wins.

Spin Wheels (Not the official title, various names were used on the real show): Three turntables were set up at a 45-degree angle. The player must climb on and use their weight to spin the turntables, scoring every time one makes one complete clockwise revolution. The high score at the end of a minute won.

Axis Spin (Not the official title, various names were used on the real show): Two team members were placed in a contraption that moved up and down, while rotating on its axis. One player must leap up towards a platform, grab an object, and place it in their basket. The teammate then follows suit. Most objects in the basket in a minute won.

=== Double Dare ===
William Tell: Based on the classic fable, this stunt involved one player using bows to launch toilet plungers towards a plexiglass wall, with a circle on it representing a target. The first player to get three plungers to stick in the circle wins, a win is noted by a bucket of slime falling on their teammate, who is sitting behind the plexiglass.

Pies in your Pants: Using a catapult, one team member launches pies toward their teammate, who tries to catch them in oversized clown pants. The most pies in the pants at the end of a minute won.

Rubber Baby Bungee Jumpers: In a large contraption one player is hooked into an enlarged diaper suspended in mid-air. The other player rolls down balloons down a ramp which is below the suspended player. Bouncing up and down, the diapered player pops the balloons, allowing the "milk" to pass the line in their bucket. First team to do so won.

=== What Would You Do? ===
Mermaid Splash: The celebrities from each team dresses up in a mermaid outfit and tries to launch fish from a pool into a bucket using their mermaid fins. At the end of 60 seconds the highest total wins.

Human Bowling: One team member is strapped into an oversized sphere, which is rolled toward oversized bowling pins. Each team has two "frames", and the one with the highest total wins.

Sumo Wrestling: Three players in oversize suits fight to push each other out of a ring. When one is knocked out of the ring, the other two get a point. Most points wins.

The scoring for this round was as on Guts: 300 Points for 1st Place, 200 for 2nd, and 100 for 3rd.

== Round 2 ==
This was the "Gakfest Question Round", a trivia round in which one team poses questions to the other teams, one player for each team tries to answer each question. If a team buzzes in with a correct answer, they earn 100 Points and the team member they competed against, not the one who read the question got slimed; otherwise they did. If both teams answer wrong, they both get slimed, and the questioning team gets 100 Points. After each question, the one with a correct answer gets to ask the next question.

For the Finals, the low scoring team was eliminated after this round.

== Round 3 ==
This was the "Action Finale", a final event involving all three teams, which took place outside of Nickelodeon Studios. Before the event, the teams were allowed to select members of the crowd to assist them, at a cost of 100 Points per person. For the Finals, the two remaining teams had to wipeout their entire score to find extra players.

The events were:
Big Ball Volleyball: Three-way volleyball, with an oversized ball. Standard volleyball rules apply, and the team with the highest score at the end of 3 minutes wins.

Gak Gauntlet: One team member must run from one end to the other while dodging gak balloons thrown by the other teams, with a successful run scoring a point. Each team has six tries, high score wins.

Gakheads: Gak filled balloons are launched at the players, who must grab one and pop it on their helmet (helmets with pins on them) to score. Most points after 3 minutes wins.

For the first two episodes, the point values for this final round increased to 1000 for 1st, 750 for 2nd, and 500 for 3rd. For the Finals, the winner of "Gakheads" won the championship.

== Music ==
The main theme for these specials was an amalgamation of themes from all the represented shows. The themes for Guts & Double Dare were played during those events, the Moat cue was played during the Legends events, while the Make the Grade theme was played during the What Would You Do? events.

The "Gakfest Question Round" as well as the "Tiebreaker" used the think music from Get The Picture's "Mega Memory" endgame, while the "Action Finale" used the theme from Think Fast.
