= Nickelodeon Studios =

Former production studio and defunct theme park attraction

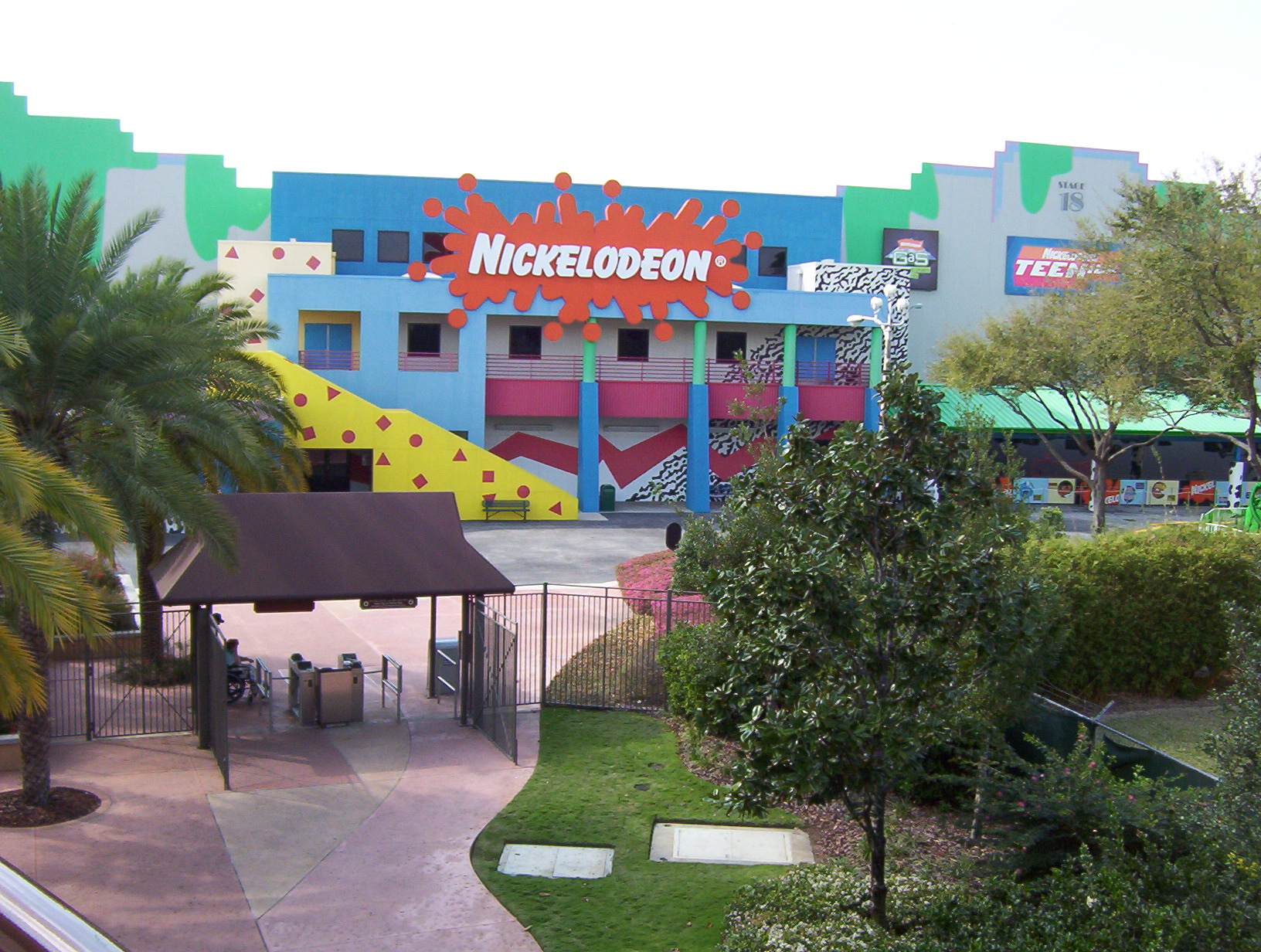
- Nickelodeon Studios in 2004

Universal Studios Florida
- Area: Building 17; Soundstage 18; Soundstage 19 (Production Central)
- Coordinates: 28°28′28″N 81°28′7″W
- Status: Removed
- Opening date: June 7, 1990 (36 years ago)
- Closing date: April 30, 2005 (21 years ago)
- Replaced by: Blue Man Group (Universal CityWalk)

Ride statistics
- Attraction type: Studio tour and working production facility
- Model: Television studio soundstage
- Theme: Nickelodeon programming
- Duration: 45 minutes
- Universal Express was available

Nickelodeon Studios was a production studio and theme park attraction run by the television network Nickelodeon at Universal Studios Florida.

Opening on June 7, 1990, as The First World Headquarters for Kids, the studio attracted young tourists as contestants and audience members for Nickelodeon's live-action programming. At its peak, the studio employed 400 people and was the largest production studio in Florida, bringing $110 million in business to the state by 1994.

The studio closed permanently on April 30, 2005, after much of Nickelodeon's production had moved to Nickelodeon on Sunset in Los Angeles. Nickelodeon Studios produced over 2,000 episodes of original programming.

== History ==
=== Planning and construction ===
In November 1988, Nickelodeon contracted space within the soon to be built Universal Studios Florida for its first production studio. Universal had determined through market research that a working studio was crucial in attracting guests to a movie themed park, and they offered Nickelodeon a sweetheart deal to supply that production. The promise of a custom-built studio at no expense, coupled with rent-free production, lured Nickelodeon away from negotiating with Disney-MGM Studios. The contract stipulated that Nickelodeon promote Universal Studios Florida on-air 1,000 times per year, while also broadcasting the park's television commercials.

Turner Construction Company began erecting two 16,500 sq ft (1,530 m^{2}) soundstages (18 and 19) and an adjacent 40,000 sq ft (3,700 m^{2}) video production facility (Building 17) within the Production Central area of the park in 1989. The exterior of the facility was designed by network production designer Byron Taylor, and the interior was designed by network art director Don St. Mars. Viacom senior vice president Scott Davis would supervise the design and construction of the complex, and he was later named the first general manager of Nickelodeon Studios.

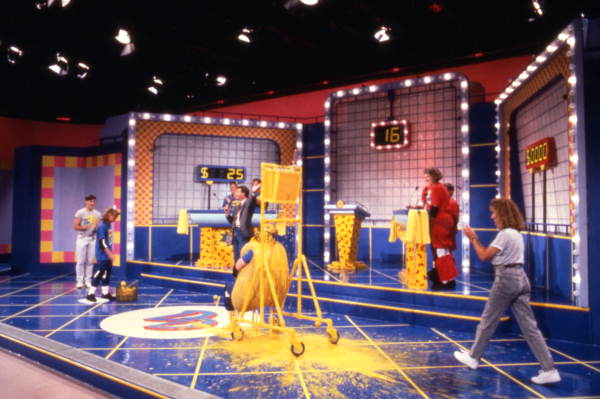
Family Double Dare taping, 1990

Super Sloppy Double Dare in April 1989 and Think Fast in January 1990 were the first Nickelodeon productions filmed at Universal Studios Florida, and they were shot on the 21,000 sq ft (2,000 m^{2}) Soundstage 21 while Nickelodeon Studios was still being constructed. Like other Nickelodeon game shows, both programs were previously filmed at WHYY-TV in Philadelphia. Nickelodeon's live-action productions had traditionally been shot on rented soundstages in multiple cities, which was not cost-effective and limited the network's growth.

Prior to the studio's completion, Double Dare executive producer Andy Bamberger, Double Dare creator Geoffrey Darby, Nickelodeon President Geraldine Laybourne, and Nickelodeon Studios general manager Scott Davis wrote their names in Building 17's second story concrete floor. Bamberger, who also served as executive producer of Make the Grade and Total Panic, wrote "I Love TV Production" above his name.

=== Opening and reception ===
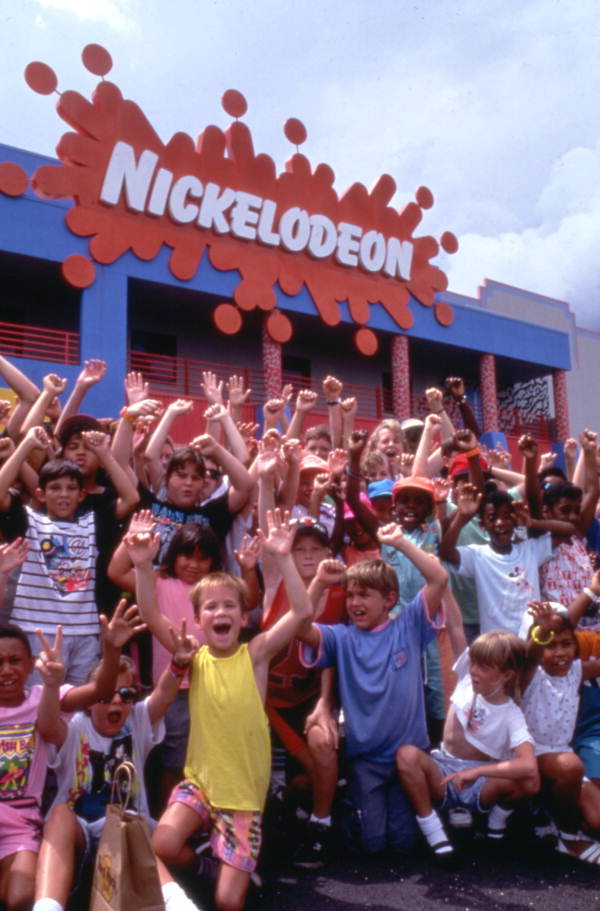
Park visitors in front of the studio, 1990

On June 7, 1990, Universal Studios Florida officially opened to the public. Nickelodeon Studios Opening Day Celebration! was broadcast live from the studio on Nickelodeon, hosted by Marc Summers of Super Sloppy Double Dare. The event was announced by John Harvey of Super Sloppy Double Dare and co-hosted by Greg Lee of Total Panic, Skip Lackey of Think Fast, Christine Taylor and Kelly Brown of Hey Dude (in character as Melody and Brad respectively), and Alie Smith, Matt Brown, Wendy Douglas and Will Friedle of Don't Just Sit There!. Celebrity appearances were made by Andrea Elson, Bill Cosby, Brooke Theiss, Danny Ponce, Gerard Christopher, Jane Seymour, Jason Hervey, Kellie Martin, Les Lye, Linda Blair, Steven Spielberg and Wil Wheaton. The broadcast included live performances by Kid 'n Play, Perfect Gentlemen and The Cover Girls.

Daily tours were given of the studio, starting with a queue area outside Soundstage 18 that led into Building 17. The 45-minute tours took park guests upstairs through the control room, through a viewing area that allowed glimpses of Soundstages 18 and 19, then downstairs through the wardrobe department and Gak Kitchen, with the tour concluding in Building 17's large audition room. While game shows were often shot 5 days a week while in production, sitcoms such as Welcome Freshmen would rehearse during the week and only shoot on weekends. This became problematic, as Nickelodeon's contract with Universal stipulated that their guests would be able to witness shows being filmed, "seven days a week, 52 weeks a year, during all hours of the tour's operation". To remedy this, the audition room was renamed Soundstage 17 and began hosting Game Lab, a mock game show at the end of every tour that culminated with one of the guests getting slimed.

Nickelodeon unveiled its Slime Geyser (also known as the Gak Geyser) in front of the studio on October 27, 1990. Russell Johnson, famous for playing The Professor on Gilligan's Island, appeared at the unveiling ceremony. The 17-foot high fountain would "erupt" with green colored water every 10 minutes. The network subsequently used a recording of the Geyser erupting as the sign-on for their broadcasting day.

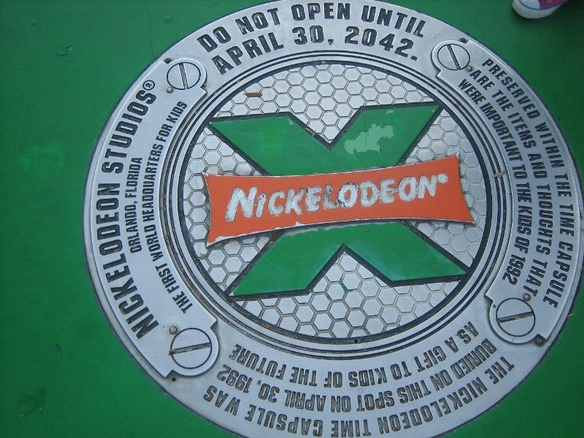
Nickelodeon time capsule, 1993

On April 30, 1992, the Nickelodeon time capsule was buried near the Slime Geyser. The burial ceremony was broadcast live on Nickelodeon and hosted by Mike O'Malley of Get the Picture and Joey Lawrence of Blossom, with an appearance by Dr. Emmett Brown of Back to the Future: The Ride (portrayed by the park's costumed performer and not Christopher Lloyd). It contains items deemed important to the children of 1992 as voted upon by Nickelodeon viewers. These items included a Barbie doll, baseball, books (comic book, endangered species book, history book, phone book, TV Guide and World Atlas), bubble gum, CDs (MC Hammer and Michael Jackson), hat featuring the catchphrase of Joey Lawrence, news reports (1991 Soviet coup d'état attempt, Dissolution of the Soviet Union, Epidemiology of HIV/AIDS and Operation Desert Storm), Nickelodeon Gak, Nickelodeon Magazine, Nintendo Game Boy, pencils, photos of things too big to fit inside (bicycles, cars, celebrities, planes, politicians and trains), piece of the Berlin Wall, Reebok Pump sneakers, Rollerblades, skateboard, t-shirt featuring the Nicktoons characters Ren and Stimpy, Twinkies, and VHS movies (Back to the Future and Home Alone). The final items put in the capsule were a tape of the event itself and the camcorder used to record it.

Roundhouse moved to CBS Studio Center in Los Angeles for the filming of its second season in 1993. The show's unionized cast, crew and musicians were unhappy that working in Orlando deprived them of residuals. As a right-to-work state, Florida had attracted producers looking to avoid union costs and regulations that were prevalent in California.

An episode of Weinerville shot on February 14, 1994, marked the 1,000th episode of live-action programming filmed at the studio since its opening. Nickelodeon Studios had at that point brought $110 million in business to Florida, and regularly employed between 280 and 330 people on a weekly basis.

=== Decline and closure ===
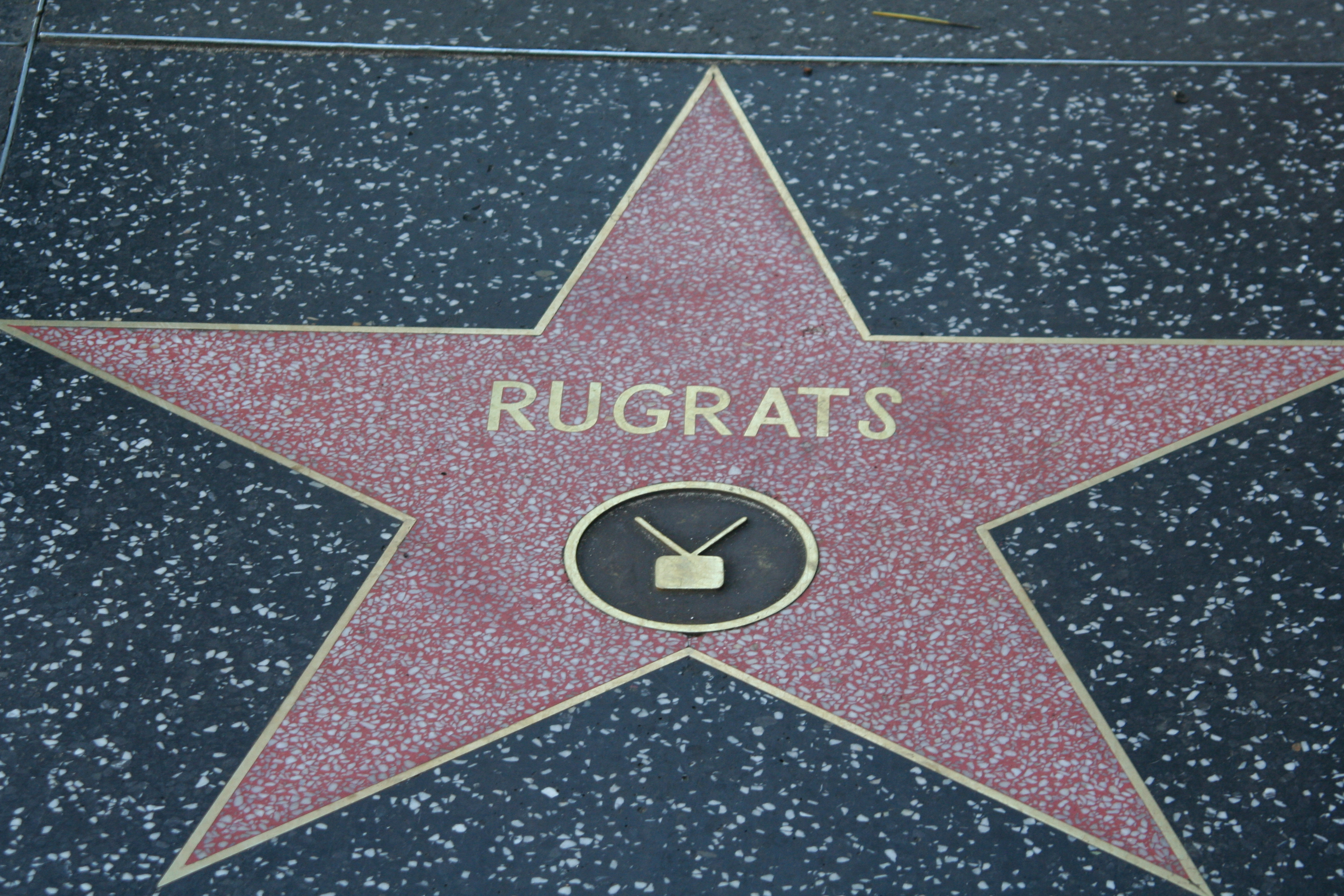
Rugrats on the Hollywood Walk of Fame

Universal Studios Florida trailed Walt Disney World in attendance at the end of 1994, with Universal hosting 7.7 million guests that year compared with Disney's 28.9 million. To stay competitive, Universal broke ground on Islands of Adventure in 1995, recommitting itself primarily as a theme park with the $2 billion expansion. Universal by then saw the production studio aspect of the park as secondary to its thrill rides, shortening their marketing slogan from See the Stars. Ride the Movies to Ride the Movies. The number of new productions began decreasing not only at Nickelodeon Studios, but at Universal Studios Florida proper and the competing Disney-MGM Studios.

Rugrats in 1995 had become an unexpected success in reruns, causing Nickelodeon to heavily invest in animation and producing new episodes of the show. Nickelodeon's in-house Nicktoons animation at the point was produced at Games Animation in Los Angeles. Albie Hecht, the network's President of Film and Entertainment, met with his in-house animators in 1996 to solicit opinions on what a new animation studio should look like. That same year, producers Mike Tollin and Brian Robbins requested Nickelodeon move filming of their hit live-action show All That from Orlando to Los Angeles so they wouldn't have to leave home for production. The network obliged, and the third season of All That was filmed on a rented soundstage at Paramount Pictures while Nickelodeon searched for a permanent Hollywood studio.

I can't think of another reason to be there. The weather stinks. Every single day I was dealing with thunderstorms. It's an inhospitable place to shoot film and TV shows. And there's not a tremendous talent pool to work with there.

— Alan Goodman

Corporate changes also began affecting the future of Nickelodeon Studios. Geraldine Laybourne, longtime champion of the Orlando facility, left her position as President of Nickelodeon in February 1996 and was replaced by executive vice president Herb Scannell. Nickelodeon Studios general manager Scott Davis exited in 1997 and was replaced by Nickelodeon Guts creator Scott Fishman.

The Mystery Files of Shelby Woo was shut down by a labor strike in August 1997 when the production switched from videotape to film stock. Movies and television shows shot on film stock were regulated by the International Alliance of Theatrical Stage Employees. The show's producer, Alan Goodman, would move production of The Mystery Files of Shelby Woo to Montreal for the filming of its final season. Canada was attracting American productions at the time with tax incentives and a favorable exchange rate.

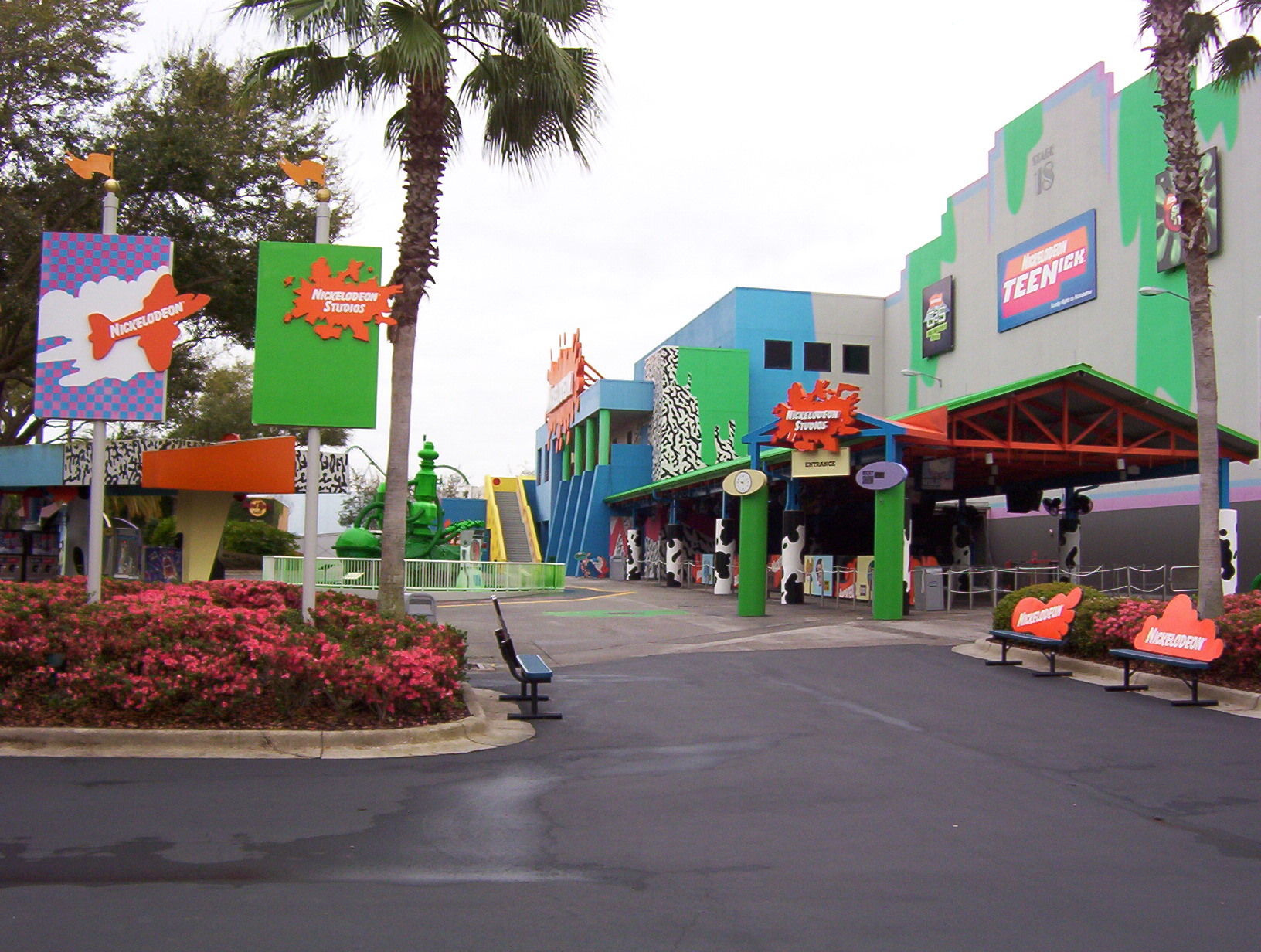
Entrance and queue area, 2004

Nickelodeon opened two new studios in California, the live-action studio Nickelodeon on Sunset in 1997, and the Nickelodeon Animation Studio in 1998. Nickelodeon Studios partnered with visual effects company Kinetix in August 1998 to upgrade Building 17 with a training center for Kinetix software, attempting to remain viable against Nickelodeon Animation Studio. Nickelodeon Games and Sports for Kids launched in 1999, airing reruns of game shows produced by the network with new wraparound segments filmed at Nickelodeon Studios.

The studio began laying off employees in March 2001 since a majority of Nickelodeon's closed-set productions had moved to California, game shows were no longer being produced, and the network's highest rated programming was animated. The studio auctioned off its remaining props in storage at their offsite scene shop in June 2001. The final program taped at the facility was Nickelodeon Splat!, which aired live on August 17, 2004. The studio closed permanently on April 30, 2005.

=== Legacy ===
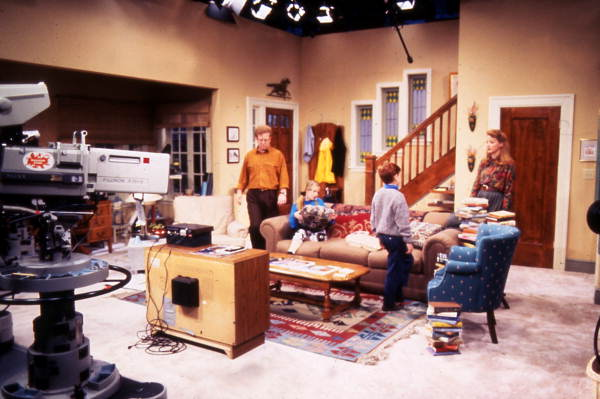
Clarissa Explains It All taping, 1991

Nickelodeon Studios was responsible for producing over 2,000 episodes of original, live-action programming for Nickelodeon. The facility employed 400 people at its peak, at which point it was the largest production studio in Florida.

Eureeka's Castle won the CableACE Award (1990) for Best Children's Series, Roundhouse won the CableACE Award (1993) for Best Original Song, Legends of the Hidden Temple won the CableACE Award (1995) for Best Game Show Series, Taina won the ALMA Award (2002) for Outstanding Children's Television Programming, and Melissa Joan Hart received the Young Artist Former Child Star Lifetime Achievement Award (2013) for her title role in Clarissa Explains It All.

Clarissa Explains It All received an Emmy nomination (1994) for Outstanding Children's Program, Nick News: Space Shuttle, Phone Home received an Emmy nomination (1995) for Outstanding Children's Special, and Gullah Gullah Island received an Emmy nomination (1997) for Outstanding Preschool Children's Series.

=== Remnants ===
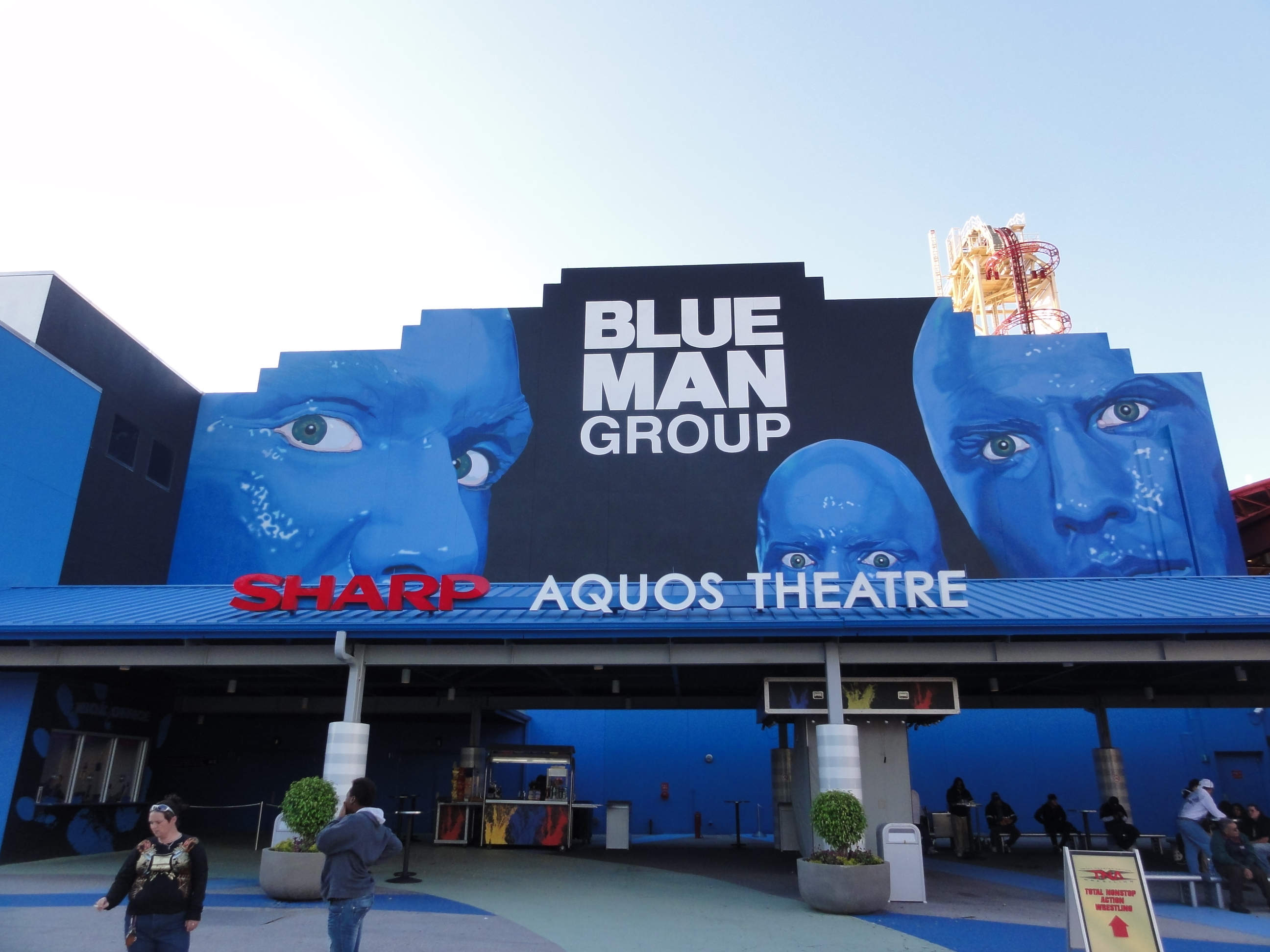
Sharp Aquos Theatre, 2010

On November 9, 2006, Universal announced that Soundstage 18 would be redesigned to become a 1,000-seat permanent venue for the Blue Man Group's self-titled residency show. The new theatre opened on June 1, 2007, and was sponsored by Sharp Aquos until 2012. Their residency ended on February 1, 2021, leaving Soundstage 18 vacant as of 2026.

The Nickelodeon time capsule buried by the network in 1992 was removed in August 2006 and reburied at the Nickelodeon Suites Resort. Upon the hotel's closure and rebranding in 2016, it was reburied at the Nickelodeon Animation Studio and is set to be opened on April 30, 2042. The time capsule's original cover was sold by Heritage Auctions in 2022 for $19,200.

Nickelodeon returned to film My Family's Got Guts in 2008, using some of the former Nickelodeon Studios facilities including the green room. Training was in Soundstage 19, and the actual production was filmed nearby on Soundstages 23 and 24.

The complex became popular for urban exploration, as Universal left much of the original Nickelodeon branding intact for years after the studio closed. In 2012, YouTube personality Adam the Woo gained access to Soundstage 19 and the upper floors of Building 17, documenting vastly untouched murals and decor from the heyday of the studios. A majority of these remnants were removed following a 2018 renovation.

== Production history ==
This is a list of programs that were filmed at the studio by Nickelodeon.

- Nickelodeon Studios Opening Day Celebration! (1990)
- Total Panic (1990)
- Make the Grade (1990)
- Outta Here! (1990)
- Family Double Dare (1990 & 1992)
- Get the Picture (1991)
- Hi Honey, I'm Home! (1991)
- Nick Hit List (1991)
- Eureeka's Castle (1991 & 1992)
- Nick Arcade (1991 & 1992)
- Fifteen (1991 & 1992)
- Clarissa Explains It All (1991, 1992 & 1993)
- Welcome Freshmen (1991, 1992 & 1993)
- What Would You Do? (1991, 1992 & 1993)
- Nickelodeon Launch Box (1991, 1992, 1993 & 1994)
- Roundhouse (1992)
- Nickelodeon Guts (1992, 1993 & 1994)
- Nick or Treat! (1992–1995 & 1997)
- Nick News: Kids World Council – Plan It for the Planet (1993)
- Weinerville (1993 & 1994)
- Legends of the Hidden Temple (1993, 1994 & 1995)
- My Brother and Me (1994)
- Nick News: Space Shuttle, Phone Home (1994)
- U to U (1994)
- Nickelodeon All-Star Challenge (1994)
- All That (1994 & 1995)
- Allegra's Window (1994, 1995 & 1996)
- Teacher to Teacher with Mr. Wizard (1994, 1995 & 1996)
- Gullah Gullah Island (1994, 1995, 1996, 1997, & 1999)
- Slime Time: U Match, U Win! (1994, 1995 & 1997)
- Global GUTS (1995)
- The Mystery Files of Shelby Woo (1995, 1996 & 1997)
- Kenan & Kel (1996 & 1997)
- Binyah Binyah! (1997)
- The Big Help: Sister Hazel Live (1997)
- Figure It Out (1997 & 1998)
- You're On! (1998)
- Tooned In! (1998, unaired pilot)
- Figure It Out: Family Style (1998)
- Who Knew? (1998, unaired pilot)
- Me and My Friends (1998, unaired pilot)
- Figure It Out: Wild Style (1999)
- 1999 Kids' Choice Awards (1999)
- Nickelodeon GAS (1999, 2000 & 2001)
- Double Dare 2000 (2000)
- Slime Survivor (2000, unaired pilot)
- Noah Knows Best (2000)
- 2000 Kids' Choice Awards (2000)
- SNICK Underground: A-Teens Live (2000)
- SNICK Underground: Baha Men Live (2000)
- Taina (2000)
- Slime Time Live (2000–2004)
- Gamefarm (2003)
- Nickelodeon Splat! (2004)
