= Eli Noyes =

American animator (1942–2024)

- Noyes in 1964
- Born: Eliot Fette Noyes, Jr. October 18, 1942; Amherst, Massachusetts, U.S.
- Died: March 23, 2024 (aged 81); San Francisco, California, U.S.
- Education: Harvard University
- Occupation: Animator
- Notable work: Clay or the Origin of Species
- Style: Stop motion
- Spouse: Augusta Talbot
- Children: 2
- Father: Eliot Noyes

Eliot Fette Noyes, Jr. (October 18, 1942 – March 23, 2024) was an American animator most noted for his stop animation work using clay and sand. His 1964 work, Clay or the Origin of Species, was nominated for an Academy Award for Best Animated Short Film and established claymation as a medium. He designed animated sand pinwheels for the Nickelodeon show Pinwheel and the sand alphabet for Sesame Street.

Noyes partnered with Kit Laybourne and created the show Braingames as well as the children's television series Eureeka's Castle and Gullah Gullah Island. He co-founded the studio Alligator Planet with Ralph Guggenheim and directed animation sequences for the documentaries Under Our Skin and The Most Dangerous Man in America. Noyes was the son of architect Eliot Noyes and graduated from Harvard University in 1964.

== Early life and education ==
Eliot Fette Noyes, Jr. was born on October 18, 1942, in Amherst, Massachusetts, the son of noted "Harvard Five" architect Eliot Noyes and interior designer Molly Duncan Weed Noyes. He was the brother of Fred Noyes. He attended the Putney School, graduating in 1960. He graduated from Harvard University in 1964. Alongside Caroline Leaf, Noyes was mentored by National Film Board of Canada animator Derek Lamb.

== Career ==
Noyes started creating animated images in his teens and was one of the first animators to use clay. In 1964, Noyes created the eight-minute animated film Clay or the Origin of Species which was nominated for the Academy Award for Best Animated Short Film. The film is considered one of the earliest examples of claymation, establishing it as a medium. The work was cited by Wallace and Gromit creators, Peter Lord and David Sproxton, as a large influence on their work.

In the early 1970s, Noyes filmed documentaries with Claudia Weil, including This Is the Home of Mrs. Levant Graham, a cinéma vérité film of the life of a Black family in Washington, D.C., and Aspen: 1970, which concerned a "generational clash of architects". Noyes also used sand for his animations, including in his 1973 work Sandman and the 1976 pixelated stop motion Peanut Butter and Jelly. He also designed animated sand pinwheels for the Nickelodeon show Pinwheel and created the sand alphabet for Sesame Street.

Noyes partnered with Kit Laybourne to establish Noyes and Laybourne Enterprises in 1983. One of their first series was Braingames on HBO, and they also later created Eureeka's Castle and Gullah Gullah Island for Nickelodeon. They created ten-second channel IDs for Nickelodeon that were rotoscoped. Noyes and Laybourne Enterprises became established as the east coast branch of Colossal Pictures, from which they produced animation and network graphics for MTV's Liquid Television, as well as commercials for several major brands. In association with Colossal, Noyes directed and illustrated the 1994 interactive CD-ROM Ruff's Bone for Living Books, a project of Broderbund and Random House. He also directed and developed The Blockheads, a series of two-minute animations.

After relocating to Northern California in the 1990s, Noyes developed the Disney Channel afternoon programming block Zoog Disney with Walt Disney Imagineering. He was also involved in interactive projects with Pixar and served as the creative director for Oxygen television network in the late 1990s.

In 2003, Noyes co-founded the animation production studio Alligator Planet with Ralph Guggenheim and Alan Buder. Noyes directed animation sequences for two films which were shortlisted for the 2009 Academy Award for Best Documentary Feature, Under Our Skin and The Most Dangerous Man in America, a final nominee.

Noyes designed "Go Green" postage stamps for the United States Postal Service in 2011.

== Personal life and death ==
Noyes was married to Augusta Talbot and had two children, Isaac and Abigail. He and his family moved to San Francisco in 1991. He enjoyed jazz piano and played the accordion and oboe.

Noyes died in San Francisco on March 23, 2024, at the age of 81, owing to complications from prostate cancer.

== Filmography ==
- Clay or the Origin of Species (1964)
- Alphabet (1966)
- This Is the Home of Mrs. Levant Graham (1970)
- Aspen: 1970 (1970)
- Sandman (1973)
- Worm Dances (1973)
- Sesame Street ("Sand Letters" shorts) (1974–1991) (TV series)
- The Fable of He and She (1974)
- Bad Dog (1976)
- Peanut Butter & Jelly (1976)
- Braingames (1983–1985) (TV series)
- Nickelodeon (network IDs) (1985–1989) (TV series)
- Nick at Nite (launch IDs) (1986) (TV series)
- Eureeka's Castle (1989–1994) (TV series)
- Liquid Television (1991–1994) (TV series)

== See also ==
- Noyes & Laybourne
