= List of presidents of Nickelodeon =

The following is a list of presidents of the children's cable television network Nickelodeon.

== Dr. Vivian Horner (1977–1979) ==
Dr. Vivian Horner was in charge of operations at Nickelodeon's predecessor, the "C-3" children's channel on QUBE. She created the first program on Nickelodeon, Pinwheel, and conceived the idea for the Nickelodeon channel itself. As the role of "Nickelodeon president" did not exist yet, Horner's official titles were "vice president for education and children's programming" and "head of program development" for Warner-Amex (Nickelodeon's original parent company). She worked at Nickelodeon until 1983.

== Cyril Schneider (1980–1984) ==
In 1980, Warner-Amex hired Cyril M. Schneider to be the president of the Nickelodeon network, which made its national debut less than a year earlier. Despite introducing popular programs such as You Can't Do That on Television to the lineup in 1981, Nickelodeon operated at a loss of $10 million, and at one point had the lowest number of viewers compared to other cable channels by 1984. In 1983, Bob Pittman was made head of MTV Networks and Schneider was not comfortable with his "idiotic" approach to "home-based" television. As a result, Schneider left the network in early 1984.

== Geraldine Laybourne (1984–1996) ==
In 1980, Laybourne was hired as a program manager at Nickelodeon, at that time a year-old network with only five employees. As president, Laybourne built Nickelodeon into the first global television network to profit from selling advertising targeted towards children. Her programming approach, which used focus groups and which made a point of talking to children as equals, built the tiny cable network into an $8 billion business.

Laybourne spent 15 years at Nickelodeon, taking over the management of the network in 1984, and started accepting advertising for the network. During this period, Nickelodeon became the top-rated 24-hour cable programming service and won Emmy Awards, Peabody Awards, CableACE Awards and Parents' Choice Awards. The network had a 40% profit margin and strong growth every year.

== Herb Scannell (1996–2006) ==
In February 1996, Scannell became the president of Nickelodeon and TV Land, succeeding Geraldine Laybourne. Under his leadership, Nickelodeon (which, under his watch, included such animated series as SpongeBob SquarePants, Danny Phantom, The Fairly OddParents, Avatar: The Last Airbender, The Angry Beavers, Catscratch, and Hey Arnold!) and TV Land became the highest rated cable networks launched within the past seven years. Nickelodeon also expanded to other areas such as live theatrical shows, magazines and feature films. He was also responsible for launching Dora the Explorer, The Brothers Garcia (which is based on Los Garcia, a show he used to watch in Puerto Rico) and Taina.

== Cyma Zarghami (2006–2018) ==
Zarghami joined Nickelodeon as a scheduling clerk in 1985. She moved up through the programming department and became the channel's general manager in 1996, overseeing programming, scheduling, acquisitions, marketing, and day-to-day management of the network. Zarghami was promoted to general manager and executive vice-president in 1997.

In 2004, the position of president of Nickelodeon Television was created for Zarghami, where she oversaw production and development for the network, along with marketing, programming and creativity. After the resignation of Herb Scannell on January 5, 2006, Zarghami became president of the newly formed Kids & Family Group, which included Nickelodeon, Nick@Nite, Nick Jr., TeenNick, Nicktoons, TV Land, CMT, and CMT Pure Country.

On June 4, 2018, Zarghami resigned as president of Nickelodeon and retired, after being with the network for 33 years.

== Brian Robbins (2018–2025) ==
On October 1, 2018, Brian Robbins was announced as the president of Nickelodeon, for which he left his position as president of Paramount Players shortly after, ending his 16–month run at the studio. Despite leaving the studio, he remained involved with some of Paramount Players' films.

== Jurles Borkent (2025–2026) ==
On December 4, 2025, Paramount unveiled its TV Media leadership team. Under these changes, Jurles Borkent would now lead Nickelodeon Kids & Family after being president of the channel's international unit.

== See also ==
- List of programs broadcast by Nickelodeon
