= Nickelodeon Splat! =

American game show

- Genre: Game show
- Developed by: Kevin Weist
- Presented by: Rahman Johnson
- Theme music composer: Wade Tonken
- Country of origin: United States
- Original language: English
- No. of seasons: 1

Production
- Executive producer: Richard Barry
- Producer: Jason Harper
- Production locations: Nickelodeon Studios, Universal Studios Florida; Orlando, Florida
- Running time: 120 minutes (including commercials)

Original release
- Network: Nickelodeon
- Release: March 7 – August 17, 2004

Nickelodeon Splat! is an American game show that aired as a television block on Nickelodeon. It aired live from March 7, 2004 to August 17, 2004. A webpage created for the game show allowed viewers to interact with the program while it was airing. It was the last show taped at Nickelodeon Studios at Universal Studios Florida in Orlando, Florida, alongside the Nick GaS show, Gamefarm, prior to its closure on April 30, 2005.

== Gameplay ==
The game-based interstitials follow teams divided into three colors (green, yellow and red). The teams, composed of audience members and selected guests from the Universal Studios Florida theme park, must complete humorous tasks to earn prizes. The winning team is slimed at the end of the game.

== Splish Splat! ==
The Splish Splat! product logo

In 2004, Jakks Pacific created a gel-based compound based on the slime used in the program. The toy was sold under the name Splish Splat! in 2005.
