= Scaredy Camp =

- Genre: Reality show
- Created by: Liz Becker, Brooke Kessler, Andy Portnoy
- Developed by: Eileen Braun, Magda Liolis
- Presented by: Emma Wilson
- Composer: Sandblast Productions
- Country of origin: United States
- No. of seasons: 2
- No. of episodes: 10

Production
- Executive producer: Eileen Braun
- Production locations: Henryville, Pennsylvania (Season 1), Hancock, New York (Season 2)
- Editor: John Tierny
- Running time: 30 minutes
- Production company: Nickelodeon Productions

Original release
- Network: Nickelodeon (2002); Nick GAS (2003)
- Release: October 27, 2002 – August 16, 2003

Scaredy Camp is an American television series that aired on Nickelodeon. It was hosted by Emma Wilson (the daughter of Weakest Link host, Anne Robinson).

The show featured children competing against each other to find clues about urban legends that surround the summer camp that they are attending. Ten episodes were filmed in all, with repeats shown on Nick GAS until the channel became automated in 2005, eventually shutting down 2 years later.

The show's first season was filmed at Camp Lindenmere in Henryville, Pennsylvania, during the summer of 2002. The camp, however, was referred to as "Camp Lindenwood" on the show, for legal reasons. The second season was filmed at the French Woods Festival of the Performing Arts in Hancock, New York. The show was created by Liz Sommers (née Becker).
