= Blue Man Group (Universal Orlando) =

Defunct live show and residency (2007–2021)

Coordinates: 28°28′28″N 81°28′7″W

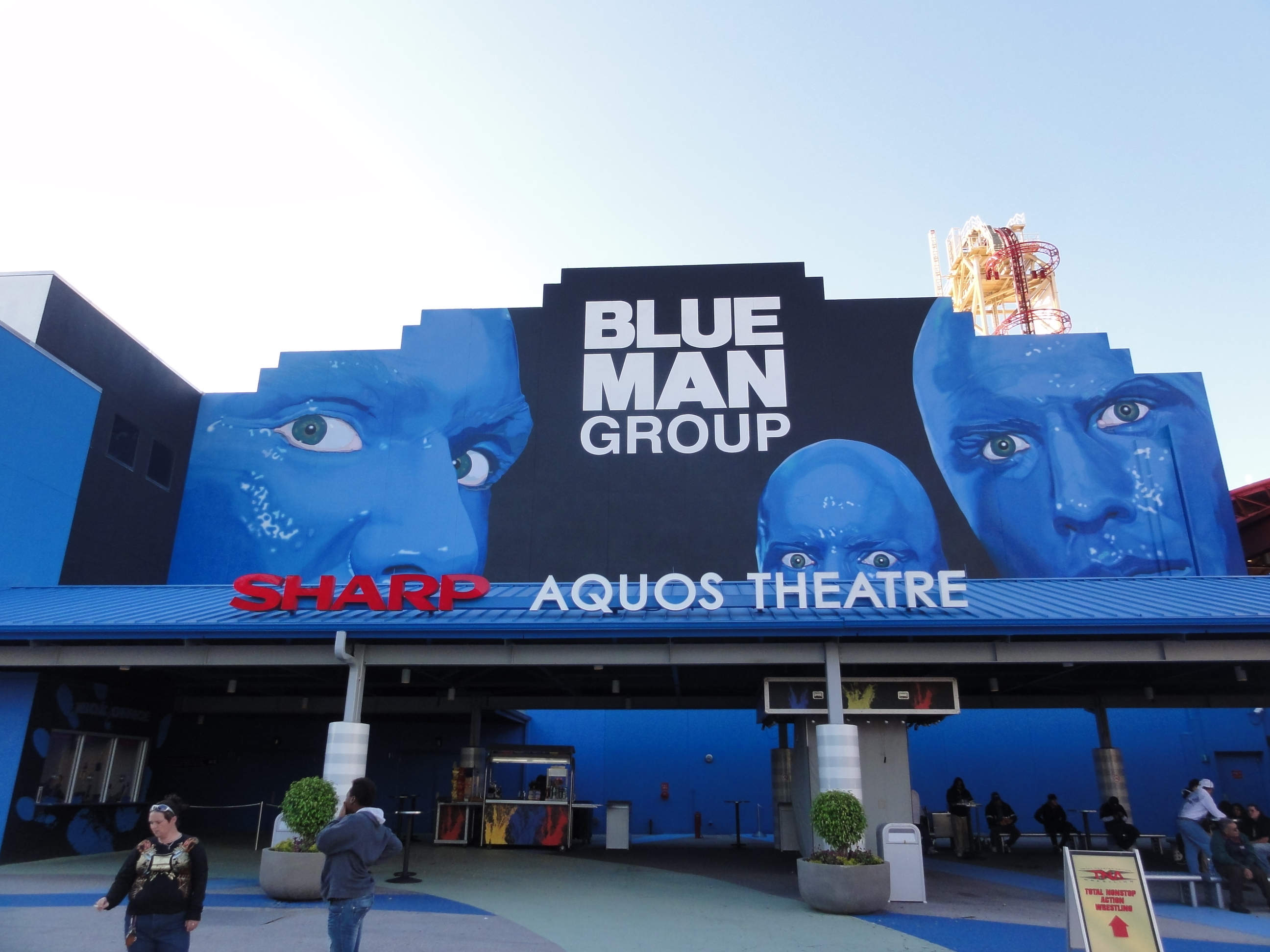
- Blue Man Group Theatre in 2010, then-sponsored by Sharp Aquos

Universal Orlando
- Area: Soundstage 18 (CityWalk)
- Status: Removed
- Opening date: June 6, 2007
- Closing date: March 15, 2020
- Replaced: Nickelodeon Studios (Production Central)
- Replaced by: The Grinchmas Who-liday Spectacular

Ride statistics
- Attraction type: Live show and residency
- Model: Theater
- Theme: Blue Man Group
- Music: Blue Man Group
- Audience capacity: 1,000 per show
- Duration: 1 hour, 45 minutes
- Sponsor: Sharp Aquos (2007–2012)
- Wheelchair accessible
- Assistive listening available
- Closed captioning available

Blue Man Group was a live residency show by the Blue Man Group at Universal Orlando Resort that ran from June 6, 2007, until February 1, 2021. The residency featured the group's unique musical and humorous performances and routines, housed in a new theater in the former Nickelodeon Studios, which was re-zoned into Universal CityWalk Orlando as a stand-alone experience within CityWalk, that required separate admission from the theme parks.

As a result of the COVID-19 pandemic in Florida, the Blue Man Group residency closed along with the rest of the resort in March 2020. Performances were put on hiatus when the resort re-opened later that year. In February 2021, the Blue Man Group announced they would be ending their residency.

== History and design ==
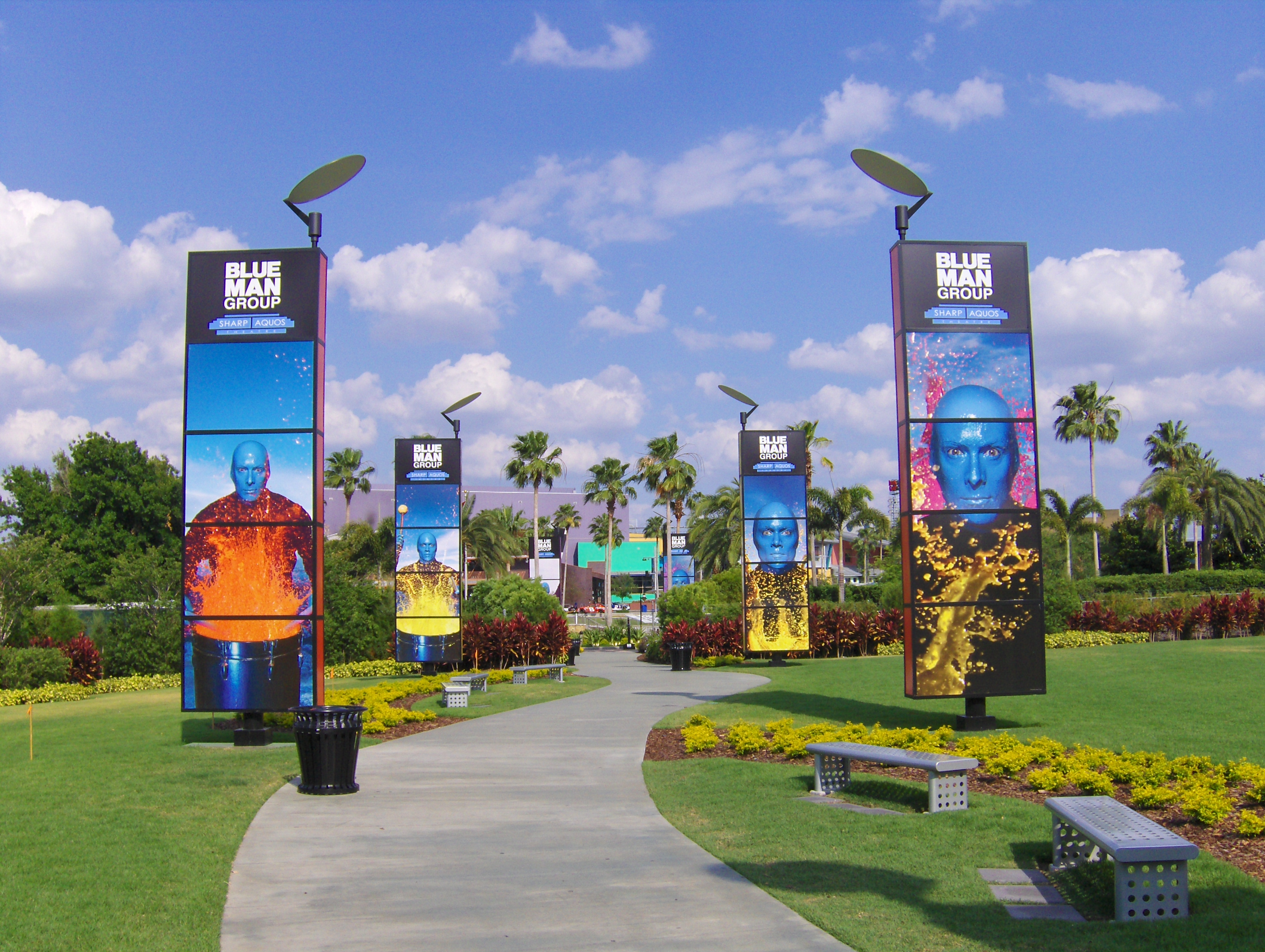
Walkway entrance to the venue housing Blue Man Group from CityWalk, seen in the background, May 2008.

On November 9, 2006, Universal Orlando announced that Blue Man Group would have a self-titled live residency at the resort and housed in a new theater; construction began shortly after the announcement. The new 1,000-seat theater was housed within Soundstage 18, which was previously occupied by Nickelodeon Studios from 1990 to 2005 at Universal Orlando's production facilities, behind Universal CityWalk's Hard Rock Cafe.

The theater's seating was organized into five different "zones", out of which, the Poncho Zone was a highly-probable "splash" zone consisting of the first four rows of the theater that guests would need to wear a poncho included in their purchase of admission.

In preparation for the rezoning of the building into CityWalk, a walkway was constructed between the Universal Studios Florida theme park and the resort's Hard Rock Cafe, allowing an easy access to the venue's entrance without needing to purchase admission to the theme park. The former Nickelodeon Studios entrance at the theme park was turned into an attended exit from the theme park to the venue's entrance. The theater was sponsored as the Sharp Aquos Theatre from its opening in June 2007 until 2012.

Between October and November 2008, the pathway to the venue was temporarily moved for construction of the Hollywood Rip Ride Rockit roller coaster, which opened in 2009. In January 2012, the Nickelodeon Kiosk closed in favor for the Blue Man Store, which opened on March 1, 2014. In November 2012, the front façade of Soundstage 18 was repainted with a Blue Man holding up the Blue Man Group logo, the "Sharp Aquos Theatre" signage on the awning was removed, the box office was redesigned, and the BMG Gear store was redone as well. In February 2016, the venue was expanded and renovated into previously abandoned areas of the studio with the first floor and lobby area repainted.

== Summary ==
Blue Man Group was housed in Soundstage 18 at Universal Orlando's production facilities and featured various bits and routines made famous by the group, along with a setlist from their discography, including a remix finale of "Last Train To Trancentral". In 2012, the Blue Man Group show was revamped as part of Universal Orlando's "Year to Be Here" campaign, featuring new bits and a new finale set to their Booty Shaker song, with classic comedy from their previous show. Each show lasted approximately 1 hour and 45 minutes.

== Closure and return to Orlando ==
On February 1, 2021, it was announced that the Blue Man Group would be ending their residency at Universal Orlando, due to the impact of the coronavirus pandemic affecting its operations. After shutting down along with the rest of the resort on the night of March 15, 2020 due to the pandemic, the residency remained closed even after the resort reopened in June 2020. The show had not been operating for nearly a year at the time of the announcement. Beginning with the 2021 holiday season, Soundstage 18 now houses the seasonal musical stage show, The Grinchmas Who-liday Spectacular.

On June 27, 2024, the Blue Man Group announced their return to Orlando with a new residency at the Icon Park, about two miles south from Universal Orlando, at International Drive. The Blue Man Group's new residency at Icon Park opened on May 1, 2026 in a 790-seat theater that was constructed at Icon Park, behind the Orlando Eye, next to Universal Boulevard. The new residency was expected for late 2024, and had an original opening date for April 3, 2025, before being pushed to 2026 due to construction delays.
