= Make the Grade =

American television series

- Genre: Education
- Created by: Michael Klinghoffer
- Developed by: Bonni Grossberg; Robert Mittenthal; Herb Scannell; Nina Silvestri; Cyma Zarghami
- Presented by: Lew Schneider; Robb Edward Morris
- Narrated by: Maria Milito
- Composer: Edd Kalehoff
- Country of origin: United States
- Original language: English
- No. of seasons: 3
- No. of episodes: 160

Production
- Executive producers: Geoffrey Darby; Kristin Martin; Andy Bamberger
- Production locations: New York, New York (1989–1990); Nickelodeon Studios, Universal Studios Orlando, Florida (1990)
- Running time: 23–24 minutes
- Production company: Games Productions

Original release
- Network: Nickelodeon
- Release: October 2, 1989 – September 14, 1990

Make the Grade is a children's game show that aired from October 2, 1989, to September 14, 1990, on Nickelodeon.

== Broadcast history ==
Make the Grade premiered on Nickelodeon on October 2, 1989, with three seasons worth of first-run episodes airing weekdays. Reruns then aired until December 29, 1991. Reruns later aired on Nick GAS from January 2, 2000, to April 5, 2004.

The first two seasons were hosted by Lew Schneider and taped in a small New York studio with no live audience and pre-recorded crowd noise. For the third season, the show moved to the newly opened Nickelodeon Studios at Universal Studios in Orlando, Florida, this time with a studio audience, and Robb Edward Morris taking Schneider's place as host. New York–based disc jockey Maria Milito was the announcer for the entire run.

NOTE: All times are Eastern.

Date	Day	Time slot
Fall 1989 – Spring 1991	Weekdays	6:30 p.m.
Summer – Fall 1991	Weekends	4:30 p.m.
Fall – Winter 1991	Sundays	4:30 p.m.

== Gameplay ==
=== Main Game ===
Three contestants – each seated at either a red, green, or blue desk – competed to answer trivia questions and acquire squares on a 7x7 split-flap game board. Seven grade levels, covering elementary school and grades 7 through 12, ran along the top of the board, while seven categories ran down the left edge. The contestants' goal was to answer enough questions to light every category and grade level on the desk.

In the first season, each episode had a different set of seven categories. In the second and third seasons, one category was always a "Special Elective", represented by a checkmark.

==== Categories ====
- History
- Music
- Science
- Home Ec.
- Geography
- P.E.
- Mathematics
- English
- Arts
- Social Studies
- Current Events

Most squares contained questions, which were played as toss-ups and were open to all three contestants. If a contestant answered correctly, they won that square and control of the board, and the category and grade level lit up on their desk. An incorrect response or running out of time allowed either of the other two contestants a chance to buzz-in once the host had re-read the question. If no one answered correctly, the square turned black and was taken out of play for the rest of the game.

Several squares contained other items that altered the outcome of the game:

- Take: Allowed a contestant to steal one square from the opponent of their choice.
- Lose: Forced a contestant to forfeit one square of their choice, which would be placed back on the board as another question or item.
- Free: Gave the square to the contestant who picked it without having to answer a question.
- Fire: Triggered a "Fire Drill" physical challenge for all three contestants.

The first contestant to light all 14 squares on their desk, or the contestant who had lit the most squares at the end of two rounds if no one had all 14, won $500 and advanced to the Honors Round. In the event of a tie for most lights at the end of the game, the contestant who had claimed the most squares in their current color on the category board won the game. The other two contestants received $50 and two or three consolation prizes. All contestants received a pair of British Knights sneakers.

==== Fire Drills ====
Like other Nickelodeon game shows, Make the Grade allowed contestants to participate in (sometimes messy) challenge stunts called "Fire Drills". When a contestant uncovered a "Fire" square on the category board, all three participated in this challenge. The first contestant to complete the Fire Drill earned the right to claim any one of the three desks as their own; the second-place finisher selected one of the remaining two, and the third-place finisher took the last desk by default.

Claimed squared and lit categories/grade levels corresopnded to the desk at which they had been earned, not to any particular contestant. Because of this rule, a contestant could do well in answering questions but lose their lead if they failed to win a Fire Drill.

=== Honors Round ===
The day's champion had a chance to win cash and/or prizes by answering seven questions in 45 seconds. Three categories were offered, each containing questions from all subjects used in the main game, and the champion selected one at the beginning of the round.

==== First season ====
Each subject contained only one question. Missing or passing a question moved the champion on to the next subject. A miss put the current subject out of play, but a pass allowed the champion to redo the subject (with the same question) after attempting all seven subjects if time permitted. The first six correct answers awarded $100 each, while the seventh increased the bonus round total to $1,000.

==== Second and third seasons ====
Passed or missed questions kept the current subject in play, but the host still moved on to the next one. After playing through all seven subjects, the champion could return to any they had passed or missed, receiving a new question in each. The first six correct answers were still worth $100 each, but the prize for the seventh was a trip to Universal Studios Florida rather than a cash bonus.

=== Time-filling segments/University Round ===
In the first season, where the game finished early and there was additional time to fill in the program, it was filled with clips of host Schneider going to malls and asking questions, and during the third season, studio audience members were asked questions to win T-shirts and other small prizes. On a few episodes, a contestant won the game so early that another game got started with a second set of contestants, playing the second game in abbreviated time. On one occasion where the game ended early, the contestants played what would have been that rounds Fire Drill stunt prior to the Honors Round, where the winner earned another $50 towards their winnings.

In second-season episodes, the day's winner would occasionally be invited to play a University Round for additional money. A series of five questions were asked, for $50, $100, $200, $500, and $1,000, respectively. The contestant could stop and take the cash at any time, but an incorrect answer ended the round and forfeited their total. Winnings from the main game and Honors Round were not at risk.
