= Get the Picture (game show) =

American children's game show

- Created by: Marjorie Cohn
- Developed by: Gwen Billings; Herb Scannell
- Presented by: Mike O'Malley
- Narrated by: Henry J. Waleczko
- Composer: Dan Vitco
- Country of origin: United States
- No. of seasons: 2
- No. of episodes: 115

Production
- Executive producers: Andy Bamberger; Geoffrey Darby (season 2); Brown Johnson
- Production locations: Universal Studios; Orlando, Florida
- Running time: 30 minutes

Original release
- Network: Nickelodeon
- Release: March 18 – December 6, 1991

Get the Picture is a children's game show that aired from March 18 to December 6, 1991, with repeats until March 13, 1993 on Nickelodeon. Hosted by Mike O'Malley, the show featured two teams answering questions and playing games for the opportunity to guess a hidden picture on a 4×4 matrix video wall made up of sixteen individual displays. The show was recorded at Nickelodeon Studios in Universal Studios, Orlando, Florida. The program's theme music and game music was composed by Dan Vitco and Mark Schultz, and produced by Schultz. Its tagline is The Great Frame Game.

There were 40 episodes taped for season one in the spring of 1991, and 75 episodes taped for season two in the summer of that same year. Season two began airing on August 5.

== Gameplay ==
Two teams of two players, one wearing orange jumpsuits and one wearing yellow jumpsuits, competed.

The object of the game was to correctly guess hidden pictures on a 4×4 video wall and to answer general-knowledge trivia questions to earn opportunities to guess. This was done in two separate rounds.

=== Round 1: Connect The Dots ===
The gameplay described here is from the first season. Changes are detailed in another subsection.

In this round, an outline of dots representing something in a set category was revealed on the 16-square video wall. A series of general-knowledge trivia questions would be asked to the teams, with a correct answer earning that team $20 and a choice of a square. Once a square was chosen, the dots in it were connected to the rest of the puzzle and the team had five seconds to guess the picture. Guessing correctly earned $50, while an incorrect guess lost $20. There was no penalty for not guessing.

The round continued until time ran out. If a picture was being played when time was called, it would be revealed one square at a time until someone guessed correctly and earned the $50. Multiple guesses were allowed, with no penalties for incorrect guesses.

=== Power Surges ===
At various points in the game, the teams would reveal Power Surges randomly hidden on the board. In round one, a square that hid one allowed the team to play a bonus game for a chance at $20 and see an actual piece of the puzzle instead of the connected dots. There were two of these hidden in each picture and every Power Surge in the round involved some sort of knowledge-based activity. Failing to complete the Power Surge within the time limit awarded the money and the square to the opposing team.

=== Round 2: Dots ===
The second round featured an actual image hidden behind the video wall. Each of the squares' four corners were marked with numbers, and each question had two, three, or four possible answers. As in Round 1, if a team failed to answer correctly (in this case, come up with the allotment of correct answers) the opposing team would be able to steal control by completing the allotment themselves. Giving the required amount of correct answers won a team $40, and the team was able to complete as many lines as there were correct answers in the question. Once the four dots on the outside of the square were connected, the part of the image hidden behind the square was revealed.

Pictures in round two were worth $75, with incorrect guesses still triggering a $20 penalty, and one Power Surge was on the board. This time, the Power Surges were played at center stage and involved the players doing some sort of physical activity in order to reveal pieces of a picture puzzle.

Again, if time was running short, the puzzle in play would be revealed one square at a time until someone guessed correctly for $75. Whoever was ahead when time was called won the game and advanced to the bonus round, dubbed "Mega Memory". Both teams kept whatever they had won with a house minimum of $100. The runner up team also received consolation prizes in addition to their money.

In the event of a tie, one final puzzle was played with the speed-up rules; whichever team guessed it correctly won the game.

=== Physical activities (Season 1 only) ===
All physical Power Surges, except one, involved players performing tasks in order to reveal pieces to a picture. After the team completed the Power Surge, they were given one chance to guess what the picture was for $40; failure to do so redirected $40 to the opposing team. The games continued until all nine numbers were revealed, time ran out, or a team ran out of objects.

- Toss Across – Played similar to the Tyco game of the same name. The team playing had 30 seconds to toss computer chips in an attempt to flip over the nine-game pieces. The pieces were three-sided and had numbers, punctuation marks, and the Get the Picture logo on them, with the object being to reveal the numbers. (The first few times this was played, two of the sides had numbers. Presumably, to avoid having all the numbers being revealed early, this was quickly changed to only one side having numbers and the other having punctuation marks. The Get the Picture logo side remained intact.)
- Ring Toss for Pieces – Same idea as "Toss Across", with the exception of the team having to throw rings over spots on a computer motherboard. The spots were not all in order, however.
- Putting for Pieces – Similar to mini golf, with nine holes to putt into.
- Shuffling for Pieces – Similar to shuffleboard, with the exception of the team shuffling large floppy disks, trying to get the center of the disk onto designated spots, in numerical order from top to bottom. This game and the ring toss game used a larger grid than the Toss Across and mini golf games.
- Jigsaw Puzzle – The team had 45 seconds to put a jigsaw puzzle together, retrieving the pieces from a podium and placing them on a giant jigsaw puzzle board. When time ran out, or if the puzzle had been completed, the contestants had to guess what the picture formed by the puzzle was.

=== Mega Memory ===
The winning team faced a nine-square board that hid nine pictures, all in relation to a theme revealed before the round. The pictures were shown to the players for ten seconds, with the object being to remember where they were placed. A nine-numbered keypad was used by the players, with each picture hidden behind a corresponding number. For 45 seconds O'Malley would read clues one at a time and the team would hit the number on the keypad that they thought would reveal the correct picture. A team was encouraged to take turns, but this rule was not enforced.

For each correct answer up to six, the team split $200. The seventh and eighth matches won merchandise prizes, and if a team matched all nine pictures before time ran out they won a grand prize.

=== Season 2 alterations ===
In season two, the rules were changed to the following:

- The game was played for points instead of money.
- Each team's boy contestant was standing on the left side of the podium and the girl contestant was standing on the right side.
- A toss-up picture was played at the beginning of the game for 20 points.
- All Power Surges were knowledge-based, and an additional Power Surge was added in Round 2. Every Power Surge took place at center stage.
- The time limit in Mega Memory was reduced to 35 seconds, with the team splitting $100 for each of the first six matches.
- Instead of computer keyboard buzzers, the teams used blue plunger buzzers and wore nametags on their jumpsuits.
- The podium the contestants stood at was redesigned. Season One just had a small "Get the Picture" logo at the center of the screen. The redesigned version for Season Two had a massive logo that took up the entire board.
- The "connect the dots" intro to Season One was removed in lieu of a glance at the initial toss-up puzzle.
- It was more common in Season Two to show a screenshot of a "completed" puzzle following its completion, even if the audience had already seen it completed.

== Reruns ==
Although the series ended first-run episodes on December 6, 1991, reruns aired weekly until March 13, 1993. Reruns aired on Nick GAS from the channel's launch on March 1, 1999, until its closure on December 31, 2007. Episodes of Get the Picture could be watched on Nick's own TurboNick service from 2007 until 2009.

== International versions ==
In 2017, Netherlands had its own version called Snap Het (Got It) on Nickelodeon Benelux hosted by Iris Hesseling and Stef Poelmans. In addition, the show has also aired on Nickelodeon Netherlands and Nickelodeon Belgie.
In 1993, United Kingdom had its own version on Nickelodeon UK hosted by Peter Simon.

Country	Name	Host	Network	Date premiered
Netherlands; Belgium (Flanders)	Snap Het	Iris Hesseling and Stef Poelmans	Nickelodeon Netherlands & Belgie	2017
United Kingdom	Get the Picture	Peter Simon	Nickelodeon UK	1993
