= Gullah Gullah Island =

American children's television series

- Genre: Children's television series
- Created by: Maria Magdalena Perez-Brown; Kathleen Minton Catapano; Kit Laybourne
- Presented by: Ron Daise; Natalie Daise
- Theme music composer: Peter Lurye
- Opening theme: "Let's All Go to Gullah Gullah Island"
- Ending theme: Various
- Composer: Billy Straus
- Country of origin: United States
- Original languages: English, introducing Gullah
- No. of seasons: 5
- No. of episodes: 72

Production
- Executive producers: Maria Magdalena Perez-Brown; Kathleen Minton Catapano
- Production locations: Nickelodeon Studios; Universal Studios; Orlando, Florida
- Camera setup: Videotape; multi-camera
- Running time: 22 minutes
- Production companies: Magnet Productions (season 1); Perez-Minton Productions

Original release
- Network: Nick Jr.
- Release: October 24, 1994 – March 7, 2000

Gullah Gullah Island is an American musical children's television series that aired on the Nick Jr. block from October 24, 1994 to March 7, 2000. The show was hosted by Ron Daise, the former vice president for Creative Education at Brookgreen Gardens in Murrells Inlet, South Carolina until 2023, and his wife Natalie Daise (née Eldridge), both of whom also served as cultural advisors, and were inspired by the Gullah culture of Ron Daise's home of St. Helena Island, South Carolina, part of the Sea Islands.

== Cast ==
- Ron Daise as Ron Alston
- Natalie Eldridge Daise as Natalie Alston
- James Edward Coleman II as James Alston
- Vanessa Baden as Vanessa Alston (1994-1998)
- Corey Murphy as Rick
- Shaina M. Freeman as Shaina Alston (1994-1997)
- Tristin Mays as Shaina Alston (1997-1999)
- Manolo Villaverde as Abuelo
- Iris Chacón as Juana
- Pixee Wales as Grandma Pixee
- Amy Brandis as Susana
- Mike Walker as Ranger Mike
- Anita Endsley as Miss Audra (1995-1997)
- Corey Hayes as Corey
- Siti Opeal as Miss Siti
- Simeon Othello Daise as Simeon Alston
- Cristian Sola as Miguel (1997)
- Sara Makeba Daise as Sara (1994–1997)
- Mia Barrington as Mia
- Lisa Campbell as Susie
- Gregory Davis, II as Greg
- Armando Guerra as Armando (1994–1997)
- Philip D. Garcia (1994–1996) as Binyah Binyah
- Justin Campbell (1997–1999) as Binyah Binyah
- Ana Christina Randolph as Marisol
- Bryan Nguyen as Bryan
- Zachary Chartier as Zachary
- Jessica Gorski as Jessica
- Kelly Holden as Greta
- Willa Nathan as Willa
- Jaymen-Angel Clark as Peter
- Jim Kroupa as Chansome the Pelican

== Episodes ==
=== Season 1 (1994) ===
No. overall	No. in season	Title	Directed by	Written by	Original release date
1	1	"Ron's Birthday"	Chuck Vinson	Jeffrey Solomon	October 25, 1994
Ron's in for a huge surprise as Natalie and the kids prepare a secret celebration for his birthday. Shaina and her friend Sara make presents for Ron out of clay, but will James find the right gift for his Dad?
2	2	"Charleston Market"	Chuck Vinson	Fracaswell Hyman	October 26, 1994
A trip off Gullah Gullah Island to the bustling Charleston Market is the occasion for visits with a woodcarver, a basketweaver, and for Natalie to sell her beautiful dolls. James gets a kick out of buying beads to make a necklace for his mother.
3	3	"The Binyah Binyah Polliwog Show"	Liz Plonka	Fracaswell Hyman	November 14, 1994
When James gets angry with Binyah Binyah and says some hurtful words, the poor creature gets upset and runs away. Binyah Binyah's absence triggers heartfelt memories of the fun and the love he's brought into their lives, as Ron, Natalie, and kids explore the origins and habits of the Binyah Binyah Polliwog species. James also learns how important it is to be nice to someone you care about even when they make a mistake.
4	4	"Gullah Gullah Island Day"	Chuck Vinson	Fracaswell Hyman	November 2, 1994
Join Ron, Natalie, and the kids as they come together with their friends for an outdoor celebration of the rich heritage of Gullah Gullah Island. Song, dance, and games, not to mention some delicious down-home cooking, are the order of the day. Shaina gets over stage fright and joins the rest of the family on stage for a rousing rendition of the Gullah Gullah Island theme.
5	5	"Going Places"	Chuck Vinson	Susan Kim	November 4, 1994
On the move--planes, trains, automobiles, donkeys, elephants...everything but the Previa family van, which won't start when Ron, Natalie, and James try to go on a trip. But Marisol's Abuelo the best mechanic in the world has the van rolling in no time and the Alstons takes a jaunt on Mr. Bradley's shrimp boat.
6	6	"Yes I Can"	Liz Plonka	Eric Weiner	November 3, 1994
Shaina agonizes about not being able to tie her shoelaces and James is embarrassed when he tries to whistle but can't. The kids find out that the only way to learn something is by believing in yourself and trying again and again. A lesson in the art of tie-dye restores Shaina's confidence and James leads the others in a whistling parade.
7	7	"Rain, Rain Go Away"	Chuck Vinson	Fracaswell Hyman	October 24, 1994
It's raining, it's boring...but not on Gullah Gullah Island. When the kids put their heads together they come up with exciting ways to occupy themselves indoors on a rainy day. Once the sun comes out, James and Marisol teach Binyah Binyah a new way of looking at himself and the Alstons hit the beach for some serious kite-flying.
8	8	"Baby Animals"	Liz Plonka	Carin Greenberg Baker	November 28, 1994
When Natalie goes through a basket of James's and Shaina's baby clothes, thoughts on Gullah Gullah Island turn to babies and little things. Marisol and Armando show off their new pet chicks and Ranger Mike Walker teaches the kids about baby birds and mother turtles. Binyah Binyah Polliwog reminds us that although he's so big, he's just a baby too.
9	9	"Oops!"	Liz Plonka	Teleplay by: Fracaswell Hyman; Story by: Fracaswell Hyman & Jeffrey Solomon	December 14, 1994
Everybody makes mistakes every once in a while, and the folks on Gullah Gullah Island are no exception. After a series of mishaps, Vanessa and James learn that mistakes are just a part of life and that people don't love you any less if you mess up once in a while. Meanwhile, a lovestruck Binyah Binyah Polliwog makes valiant efforts to reach the bird of his dreams.
10	10	"James' Treasure Box"	Chuck Vinson	Mollie Fermaglich & Fracaswell Hyman	December 6, 1994
Lobster claws and old spark plugs--these are some of the weird things collector James carries around in a tattered shoebox and a trip to the beach with Ranger Mike yields even more "treasures". Ron and Natalie decide it's time James had a proper place to keep his things.
11	11	"Please Don't Eat the Alstons"	Liz Plonka	Jeffrey Solomon	November 7, 1994
Big fat biscuits, cookies, broccoli, fresh fruit and other treats are on the menu in this mouth-watering episode which includes a fun-filled trip to the Gullah Gullah Island supermarket and a cameo appearance by a superhero made out of okra. A trail of crumbs leads the kids to a mysterious cookie thief and James learns not to be so hasty in laying the blame on others.
12	12	"Carnival"	Liz Plonka	Pat Cummings	December 12, 1994
When Juana (Iris Chacón) brings gifts of musical instruments back from Puerto Rico, everybody decides that a dress-up Carnival is the only way to go. Imaginations run wild as folks come up with outrageous disguises and James and Natalie try on different faces at the local mask shop.
13	13	"Relaciones Familiares"	Liz Plonka	Fracaswell Hyman	December 2, 1994
The Alstons' house on Gullah Gullah Island is a family kind of place, where friends and even polliwogs are invited to make themselves at home. Cousin Vanessa talks...and...talks to her parents far away in Africa and Armando and Marisol show that just because brothers and sisters fight all the time that doesn't mean they don't love each other. Juana teaches the kids some new Spanish words.
14	14	"The Green Show"	Liz Plonka	Susan Kim	November 9, 1994
Shaina's going to plant her first seedlings in the family garden, so Natalie takes her to visit their friend and neighbor Farmer Holmes. Farmer Holmes gives Shaina a crash course in gardening and back home, even Binyah Binyah Polliwog shows he has a green thumb.
15	15	"The School Show"	Liz Plonka	Teleplay by: Eric Weiner; Story by: Eric Weiner & Fracaswell Hyman	November 30, 1994
Shaina's always been curious about what the older kids do in school all day and finally, she and her friend Sara are getting to visit a real kindergarten. Lively stage performance by the Georgia Sea Island Singers has the kids hopping and bopping to traditional games like "Hambone", while others learn new uses for shaving cream. Ron introduces an upbeat new version of the alphabet song.
16	16	"Say What?!"	Chuck Vinson	Eric Weiner	December 8, 1994
On a quiet day on Gullah Gullah Island, Natalie likes to cover her eyes and just listen to the sounds around her--chirping birds, an airplane overhead, breaking glass. Ron the handyman is at it again as the kids learn that listening to the world around us can be just as exciting as seeing or touching. Shaina plays conductor for a day with the Brotherhood Gospel Singers.
17	17	"Rhythm & Rhyme All the Time"	Liz Plonka	Teleplay by: Carin Greenberg Baker & Fracaswell Hyman	November 17, 1994
Flower, shower, Spring, swing, Cat, hat--on Gullah Gullah Island the beat goes on as rhyming fever spreads like wildfire among the Alstons and their friends. Homeboy James struts his stuff with a new rap tune and Ron adds a twist to some well-known nursery rhymes and stories. Even Binyah Binyah gets into the groove with some wacky inventions of his own.

=== Season 2 (1995–96) ===
No. overall	No. in season	Title	Directed by	Written by	Original release date
18	1	"Let the Games Begin"	Chuck Vinson	Craig Shemin	September 10, 1995
James goes on a mission to see how many kinds of games he can find. Meanwhile, Vanessa and Marisol teach Binyah Binyah some games and Binyah Binyah keeps asking to play more games much to Vanessa's frustration when she can't think of anymore games.
19	2	"Friendship-Just the Perfect Blendship"	Chuck Vinson	Kermit Frazier	September 28, 1995
Shaina is excited about meeting a new boy named Corey, Vanessa and James go crabbing.
20	3	"Natalie's Sick"	Chuck Vinson	Fracaswell Hyman	September 12, 1995
The kids take care of Natalie while she is sick with a cold and Binyah Binyah picks her flowers.
21	4	"Taking Care of Business"	Chuck Vinson	Carin Greenberg Baker	September 21, 1995
Shaina goes to the dentist.
22	5	"Double Dutch"	Chuck Vinson	Fracaswell Hyman	September 26, 1995
Vanessa is excited to learn how to Double Dutch.
23	6	"Look Who's Balking"	Chuck Vinson	Eric Weiner	September 11, 1995
Jessica is very jealous of losing attention to her new baby sister, Willa.
24	7	"Move Your Body"	Chuck Vinson	Willie Reale	October 11, 1995
Jessica fears dancing so the family tries to help her get over her fears so she can enjoy dancing with them.
25	8	"My Favorite Things"	Chuck Vinson	Fracaswell Hyman	September 13, 1995
The family shares with each other their favorite things.
26	9	"Beat It!"	Chuck Vinson	Fracaswell Hyman	September 19, 1995
The gang learns about rhythm.
27	10	"Armando's New Home"	Carl Lauten	Carin Greenberg Baker	November 14, 1995
The kids learn the importance of having rules.
28	11	"Spring Can Really Hang You Up"	Chuck Vinson	Teleplay by: Marc Catapano; Story by: Marc Catapano & Kathleen Minton	September 18, 1995
The gang celebrates the arrival of spring.
29	12	"Whose Friend Are You Anyway?"	Chuck Vinson	Fracaswell Hyman	September 20, 1995
James gets jealous of his new great best friend.
30	13	"Gullah Gullah Ghoul-Land"	Chuck Vinson	Hillary Rollins	October 17, 1995
The kids get scared while sleeping outside.
31	14	"Things That Go Bump in the Night"	Chuck Vinson	Fracaswell Hyman	October 2, 1995
The family is awakened at night by something.
32	15	"The Pet Show"	Chuck Vinson	Fracaswell Hyman	September 11, 1996
Vanessa is given the task of watching the class pet rabbit over the weekend. But when the rabbit goes missing, it's up to Vanessa and James's new club, The Lost and Found Agency, to find him.
33	16	"The Troll That Ate Gullah Gullah Island"	Chuck Vinson	Carin Greenberg Baker	November 3, 1995
All the kids act to their own version of "The Three Billy Goats Gruff".
34	17	"The Talent Show"	Chuck Vinson	Fracaswell Hyman	October 25, 1995
The family holds a talent show to raise money to buy a new bike for Vanessa after her old bike broke.
35	18	"Grandmas and Grandpas"	Chuck Vinson	Teleplay by: Lynn Nottage & Fracaswell Hyman; Story by: Lynn Nottage	September 12, 1996
Grandma visits the family and the kids learn about grandparents.
36	19	"Get Out of My Hair"	Chuck Vinson	Teleplay by: Lynn Nottage & Fracaswell Hyman; Story by: Lynn Nottage & Maria Magdalena Perez	December 26, 1995
Simeon gets his first haircut, James puts on a beard and the girls have their very own hair show.
37	20	"Feeling Soup"	Chuck Vinson	Eric Weiner	September 13, 1996
The kids and family learn about different feelings.
38	21	"Mercy Mercy Me"	Chuck Vinson	Eric Weiner	October 19, 1995
The gang learns to recycle and organizes their very own cleanup. Note: The episode's title and plot are faithful to Marvin Gaye's 1971 song of the same name.
39	22	"Miss Ella Mae Breadsticks"	Carl Lauten	Fracaswell Hyman	November 16, 1995
Shaina is embarrassed of her imaginary friend. Meanwhile, the kids learn about driftwood art.
40	23	"Shaina's Birthday"	Chuck Vinson	Pat Cummings	June 13, 1995
It's Shaina's fifth birthday and she's excited about Sudsy the clown coming over. But when Ron gets the news about Sudsy having a bad cold and won't be able to make it, Shaina is upset and tries to cancel her party. But with help from the family, Shaina changes her mind and decided that it turned out to be the best birthday she's ever had and wishes she could have one like this every day.

=== Season 3 (1996) ===
No. overall	No. in season	Title	Directed by	Written by	Original release date
41	1	"What's Up with Jobs?"	Chuck Vinson	Eric Weiner	October 16, 1996
The kids learn about all different types of jobs.
42	2	"Away All Boats"	Chuck Vinson	Eric Weiner	June 8, 1996
Mia and the kids help build a paper boat.
43	3	"How You Sound"	Chuck Vinson	Kermit Frazier	June 9, 1996
The family sings and acts in their very own band. James, Vanessa and Bryan come with a hip-hop rendition of "Pop Goes the Weasel".
44	4	"The Gullah Gullah Games"	Chuck Vinson	Teleplay by: Marc Catapano; Story by: Marc Catapano & Kathleen Minton	November 5, 1996
Pro-basketball player, Dennis Scott, teaches James to play basketball and the importance of practice.
45	5	"Chansome's Big Surprises"	Chuck Vinson	Kermit Frazier	September 8, 1996
Chansome has a big surprise for the family.
46	6	"A Day at the Beach"	Chuck Vinson	Hillary Rollins	September 22, 1996
The family spends the day at the beach.
47	7	"Binyah Binyah's Parade"	Chuck Vinson	Andy Yerkes	October 27, 1996
Binyah Binyah is lonely and dreams of a big parade.
48	8	"Animal See, Animal Do"	Chuck Vinson	Eric Weiner	September 30, 1996
Shaina is upset when she can't have a horse.
49	9	"Food, Glorious Food"	Chuck Vinson	Carin Greenberg-Baker	November 11, 1996
The family prepares food for a potluck dinner.
50	10	"Home Alone with Grandma"	Chuck Vinson	Kermit Frazier	October 9, 1996
The kids spend the weekend alone with Grandma while Ron and Natalie take a trip for two. Shaina is worried that Grandma won't do things right but learns that communication is the key into making things not seem so different.
51	11	"Fixing a Hurt"	Chuck Vinson	Carin Greenberg-Baker	October 14, 1996
Ranger Mike takes Shaina to see how to help an injured animal at the vets after Shaina hurt her knee at the house earlier that day.
52	12	"Special Places"	Chuck Vinson	Kermit Frazier	October 22, 1996
The kids learn about special places that people go to for a quiet time. Vanessa makes one in the garage after being annoyed by Shaina's tea party.

=== Season 4 (1997–98) ===
No. overall	No. in season	Title	Directed by	Written by	Original release date
53	1	"Simeon's Day"	Chuck Vinson	Teleplay by: Carin Greenberg-Baker; Story by: Nancy Krulik & Carin Greenberg-Baker	March 11, 1998
Simeon has a special day with many surprises including hot dogs for breakfast and a puppet show.
54	2	"Family Day"	Otis Sallid	Eric Weiner	December 6, 1997
James is upset when Saturday doesn't go as he planned but learns that it's best to just relax and be flexible.
55	3	"The Mighty Cootas"	Otis Sallid	Don Gillies	February 16, 1998
Shaina and Binyah Binyah play baseball for the Cootas and learn that being a good sport is the right thing to do when playing games, no matter if you win, lose, or even make a mistake.
56	4	"Campout"	Otis Sallid	Eric Weiner	February 8, 1998
The family goes on a camping trip in the woods. Shaina is nervous about it because it's her first time camping but the family helps her have fun with it.
57	5	"Here Come the Hatchlings"	Carl Lauten	Teleplay by: Carin Greenberg-Baker; Story by: Carin Greenberg-Baker & Annie Evans	March 3, 1998
Vanessa stays home while the family goes with Ranger Mike to see turtles hatch.
58	6	"Binyah the Barbarian"	Otis Sallid	Teleplay by: Carin Greenberg-Baker; Story by: David Wyatt	February 15, 1998
Binyah Binyah learns proper table etiquette and how to act at an anniversary party.
59	7	"Magic Show"	Carl Lauten	Noel MacNeal	February 11, 1998
James can't seem to get his magic tricks to work. But he learns to not give up and to keep trying until he gets it right
60	8	"Gullah Rocks"	Otis Sallid	Lisa Jones	March 5, 1998
When Vanessa goes to try out for the G-Funk Band, Shaina feels sad and lonely. But with help from Ron and Natalie, she eventually builds her confidence and learns to be herself.
61	9	"Stray Dog Blues"	Otis Sallid	Teleplay by: Carin Greenberg-Baker; Story by: James Ponti & Carin Greenberg-Baker	April 7, 1998
Jessica's dog runs away right before the Gullah Gullah Island pet show.
62	10	"James's New Buddy"	Otis Sallid	Teleplay by: Kermit Frazier; Story by: Maria Perez & Kermit Frazier	March 9, 1998
The family is introduced to James's new friend, Miguel, who happens to be bilingual. However, when Vanessa and Jessica bicker, Shaina and Natalie remind them of the importance of friendship and how much they love each other.
63	11	"The Hottest Day of the Year"	Carl Lauten	Teleplay by: Marc Catapano; Story by: Kathleen Minton & Marc Catapano	February 24, 1998
On a very hot day, the air conditioning in the house breaks, and everyone try to find new ways to cool off.
64	12	"A Barrel of Laughs"	Chuck Vinson	Eric Weiner	March 23, 1998
The gang tries to make each other laugh on "Tickle My Ticklebone Day".
65	13	"Binyah Goes to School"	Chuck Vinson	Carin Greenberg-Baker	March 15, 1998
Binyah Binyah goes to school with the kids.
66	14	"A Gullah Gullah Christmas"	Carl Lauten	Fracaswell Hyman	December 11, 1997
Shaina dreams that she is in the north pole. Note: This is the Christmas special of Gullah Gullah Island.
67	15	"Big and Small"	Carl Lauten	Don Gillies	February 22, 1998
The family goes on a bicycle outing, Shaina teaches Simeon many new things.
68	16	"The Big Sleepover"	Chuck Vinson	Carin Greenberg-Baker & Kermit Frazier	April 1, 1998
The children feud over who gets to sleep in the living room during each other own sleepovers.
69	17	"Lightning is Frightening"	Otis Sallid	Carin Greenberg-Baker	December 26, 1997
The family tries to help Vanessa overcome her fear of thunder and lightning.
70	18	"Polliwog Day"	Carl Lauten	Fracaswell Hyman	February 12, 1998
The family learns all about frogs.

=== Season 5 (2000) ===
No. overall	No. in season	Title	Directed by	Written by	Original release date
71	1	"You Wanna Salsa"	Unknown	Unknown	March 6, 2000
Salsa fever hits Gullah Gullah Island! The gang learns how to dance it, play it, and even meets one of the greatest salsa musicians of all time--Tito Puente!
72	2	"Shake, Rattle and Roll"	Otis Sallid	Eric Weiner	March 7, 2000
Shaina receives her first pair of tap shoes and Binyah Binyah is excited to see that you can make music with your feet.

== Production ==
=== Origin and development ===
Ron Daise's book Reminiscences of Sea Island Heritage was published in 1987. He and his New York-born wife, Natalie Daise (née Eldridge), followed by creating and touring with a multimedia show, Sea Island Montage, based on the book as well as stories from oral histories of elderly St. Helena Island residents. After one of their performances, the Daises met with an executive producer from Nickelodeon. Creator Maria Perez-Brown had planned on building a multicultural program featuring a "magical island" and was inspired by the Daises to use the Sea Islands and elements of Gullah culture. Part of Nickelodeon's initiative to broaden its preschool programming, Gullah Gullah Island was the first show of its kind to star an African-American family set in an indigenously black community. The show's originality caused some upfront concerns. "We were apprehensive about naming it 'Gullah Gullah Island'. We wanted to make sure the portrayal was positive and didn't in any way poke fun at the culture or the community," Ron Daise said of creating a show based on an existing culture.

=== Format ===
Gullah Gullah Island is a sing-along half-hour live-action show. The format was part of a flexible thinking initiative that taught children to make good choices rather than using rote memorization.

Ron and Natalie Daise play the Alstons, who live on the fictional "Gullah Gullah Island". Additional cast featured the Daise's actual children Simeon and Sara among others, including a full-body puppet frog, Binyah Binyah. The show was taped and recorded at Nickelodeon Studios in Orlando at Universal Studios Florida, with the show Clarissa Explains It All shot on the same set interior and exterior. Modifications were made, like adding different shades of red to the home as shown on Gullah Gullah. Outdoor shots featured Beaufort and Fripp Island, South Carolina. Charleston, South Carolina, was featured in one episode when the family took a trip to the City Market.

Episodes are presented with a unified plot and not separate segments, featuring singing, dancing, learning and encouraging children to think about things like taking care of yourself, animals, telling the truth, social skills, and problem solving. The show also highlights the culture and language of Gullah, descendants of former slaves who live on the Sea Islands off the coast of South Carolina and Georgia.

== Broadcast, syndication and marketing ==
The show ran for five seasons from 1994 to 2000, with a total of 72 episodes. Following the series' end, reruns aired on Nickelodeon through July 2000. Reruns also aired on the Noggin channel during its preschool block; when the Noggin brand was revived as a streaming app in 2015, the entire series of Gullah Gullah Island was made available until its removal in early 2020.

Several special home video releases accompanied the original broadcast, including Gullah Gullah Island: Binyah's Surprise (1994), Gullah Gullah Island: Play Along With Binyah and Friends (1994), Gullah Gullah Island: Dance Along with the Daise Family (1997), and Gullah Gullah Island: Christmas (1998).

Home videos of the show were released on VHS format by Sony Wonder from 1995 to 1996 and later by Paramount from 1997 to 1998. As of February 7, 2012, every season of the series is being released to DVD through Amazon.com's MOD (Manufacture On Demand) program. Nickelodeon licensed a series of children's books, musical cassettes and "Binyah Binyah Polliwog" plush animals.

In January 2021, the entire series was added to Paramount+ (at the time CBS All Access). The Paramount+ broadcast includes a lost episode from a potential Season 5 titled "Shake, Rattle and Roll" which was supposed to originally release back in December 1999.

== Home media ==
Nickelodeon and Amazon.com teamed up to release Gullah Gullah Island and other Nick Jr. shows on manufacture on demand (MOD) on DVD-R discs available exclusively through Amazon.com's CreateSpace arm.

Title	Release date	Episodes
"Gullah Gullah Island: Season 1"	February 8, 2012 (region 1)	1-17
Three-disc release, contains all 17 episodes, exclusively released on Amazon.com, as a "CreateSpace" program of "Burn-On-Demand" DVDs.
Title	Release date	Episodes
"Gullah Gullah Island: Season 2"	February 8, 2012 (region 1)	18-40
Four-disc release, contains all 23 episodes, exclusively released on Amazon.com, as a "CreateSpace" program of "Burn-On-Demand" DVDs.
Title	Release date	Episodes
"Gullah Gullah Island: Season 3"	February 8, 2012 (region 1)	41-52
Two-disc release, contains all 12 episodes, exclusively released on Amazon.com, as a "CreateSpace" program of "Burn-On-Demand" DVDs.
Title	Release date	Episodes
"Gullah Gullah Island: Season 4"	February 8, 2012 (region 1)	53-70
Three-disc release, contains all 18 episodes, exclusively released on Amazon.com, as a "CreateSpace" program of "Burn-On-Demand" DVDs.

== Reception ==
=== Critical response ===
Critical reception of the show was consistently positive, both as a children's show and as groundbreaker for African American programming, it was praised for "vividly colored sets, infectious sing-alongs, unique character accents and quirky humor that defined the show and introduced millions of children to an overlooked but centuries-old branch of African American culture." It was described as "a combination summer camp, cheerleading session and music video." The issues, especially with the first season, had to do with show's depiction being unrealistic. "The songs were lively and catchy, the kids were cute and the general theme was unlike other kids' programming," Jenifer Managan of the Chicago Tribune wrote. However:

... it stars "perfect" parents, Ron and Natalie Daise, who with their three children (who never fight), neighbors and friends seek to entertain and socially educate kids through a sing-song series. While the show encourages active participation from at-home viewers, the dictionary responses and incomparable energy from the Daises make normal parents look like misfits. Perhaps as the show seasons, the lip-syncing will improve and the characters won't be so picture-perfect.

In 1996, TV Guide named the show one of "10 best children's shows". During its original broadcast run it was Nickelodeon's highest-rated preschool show, averaging more 750,000 viewers per episode.

=== Awards ===
Year	Award	Category	Nominee(s)	Episode	Result
1995	Parents' Choice Award	DVDs - Home Video		Gullah Gullah Island: Sing Along With Binyah Binyah	Won
1996	NAACP Image Award	Outstanding Educational/Informational Youth or Children's Series/Special	Gullah Gullah Island		Nominated
1997	NAACP Image Award	Outstanding Educational/Informational Youth or Children's Series/Special	Gullah Gullah Island		Nominated
1997	Daytime Emmy Award	Outstanding Pre-School Children's Series	Kathleen Minton (executive producer), Maria Perez-Brown (executive producer), Diane Fazio (supervising producer), Stephanie N. Jones (coordinating producer)		Nominated
1997	Writers Guild of America Award	Children's Script	Eric Weiner	Look Who's Balking	Nominated
1998	NAACP Image Award	Outstanding Educational/Informational Youth or Children's Series/Special		The Christmas Special	Nominated
1998	NAACP Image Award	Outstanding Performance in a Youth or Children's Series/Special	Ron Daise, Natalie Daise	The Christmas Special	Nominated
2000	NAACP Image Award	Outstanding Educational/Informational Youth or Children's Series/Special	Gullah Gullah Island		Nominated

== Binyah Binyah! ==
In 1997, five episodes of a "Gullah Gullah Island" miniseries titled "Binyah Binyah!" were produced at the now-defunct Nickelodeon Studios in Orlando, Florida, and aired from February 2 to February 6, 1998. A separate theme song written by Sean Altman was given to these episodes. The miniseries also featured several new puppet characters in addition to the original cast and focused on frog Binyah Binyah journeying to locations outside of Gullah Gullah. Ron and Natalie Daise were part of the cast as well. It was never broadcast again after its initial airing of episodes, nor was it released to home video.
