= Kit Laybourne =

American television producer and educator

Kit Laybourne is an American television producer and educator. Laybourne was an executive producer of animation, documentary and interactive shows at Oxygen Network a company co-founded by his wife Geraldine and Oprah Winfrey. His major production credits include Braingames for HBO, Eureeka's Castle and Gullah Gullah Island for Nickelodeon, Liquid Television for MTV, and Media Probes for PBS. In 2021, he became chief creative officer for The Whistle, a media company focusing on sports for kids.

For a dozen years, Laybourne and partner Eli Noyes ran Noyes & Laybourne, an independent animation and branding studio in TriBeCa. Most of its major works included ID's for MTV and Nickelodeon, shorts for the Children's Television Workshop, and shows for Scholastic and Nick Jr.

== Writings ==
- The Animation Book : A Complete Guide to Animated Filmmaking--From Flip-Books to Sound Cartoons. New York: Three Rivers Press. ISBN 9780517533895. The book was originally published in 1979, but upon further research into digital animation techniques, a new edition was released in 1998.
- "Mediapedia", published in 2009 by Globe Pequot Press.
