= Cyma Zarghami =

American television executive

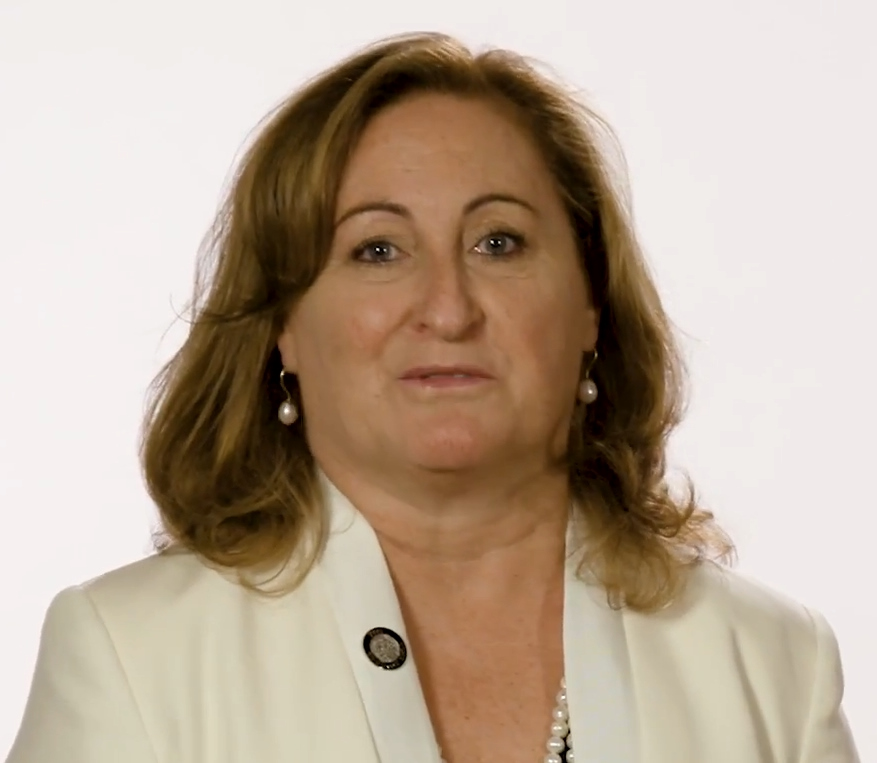
- Cyma Zarghami in 2018
- Born: December 15, 1962 (age 63); Abadan, Imperial State of Iran
- Occupations: Film executive and producer
- Employer: MiMo Studios
- Known for: Former president of Nickelodeon and Viacom Media Networks
- Spouse: George Obergfoll
- Children: 3

Cyma Zarghami (born December 15, 1962) is an Iranian-born American film studio and former cable television executive who served as the president of Nickelodeon and Viacom Media Networks' Kids & Family Group from 2006 to 2018. She is the founder and CEO of MiMo Studios.

== Early life ==
Zarghami was born in Abadan, Iran to an Iranian father, Gholam, and a Scottish mother, Catherine. The family later moved to Canada and finally to Englewood, New Jersey, where she graduated in the class of 1980 from the Dwight-Englewood School and was a recipient of the school's Distinguished Alumni Award. At Dwight-Englewood, she played lacrosse.

In 1980, Zarghami entered the University of Vermont in Burlington, Vermont as an elementary education major, later changing her major to English; she did not complete the degree. She was awarded an honorary diploma by the University of Vermont College of Education and Social Services in 2000.

== Career ==
Zarghami traveled in Europe after leaving college, then returned to Burlington to work for Business Digest.

Zarghami joined Nickelodeon as a scheduling clerk in 1985. She moved up through the programming department and became the channel's general manager in 1996, overseeing programming, scheduling, acquisitions, marketing, and day-to-day management of the network. She was promoted to general manager and then executive vice-president in 1997. In 2004, the position of president of Nickelodeon Television was created for her, where she oversaw production and development for the network, along with marketing, programming and creativity. After the resignation of Herb Scannell on January 5, 2006, she became president of the newly formed Kids & Family Group, which included Nickelodeon, Nick@Nite, Nick Jr. Channel, TeenNick, Nicktoons, TV Land, CMT, and CMT Pure Country. On June 4, 2018, she resigned as president of Nickelodeon following 33 years with the network.

In February 2020, Zarghami launched a production company and consultancy firm, MiMo Studios, to develop original film properties of one hour or less in length for young audiences. MiMo is a portmanteau of "mini movie". Cyma has come under scrutiny from fans for controversies regarding harmful working conditions to Nickelodeon kid stars.

== Personal life ==
Zarghami lives in New York City with her husband and their three sons. She formerly served on the board of the Children's Museum of Manhattan.

== Filmography ==
=== Television ===
Year	Title	Role
1989–1990	Make the Grade	Developer
2002–2004	Rugrats	Special thanks
2003–2008	ChalkZone	Special thanks
2003–2009	My Life as a Teenage Robot	Special thanks
2004–2007	Drake & Josh	Special thanks
2004–2007	Danny Phantom	Special thanks
2004–2007	Ned's Declassified School Survival Guide	Special thanks
2004–2006	Unfabulous	Special thanks
2005–2008	Zoey 101	Special thanks
2006	Just for Kicks	Special thanks
2007–2008	El Tigre: The Adventures of Manny Rivera	Special thanks
2008–2011	The Mighty B!	Special thanks
2008–2009	Random! Cartoons	Special thanks
2009–2015	The Penguins of Madagascar	Special thanks
2010–2013	Victorious	Special thanks
2013–2015	The Haunted Hathaways	Special thanks
2015–2016	100 Things to Do Before High School	Special thanks
2015	Harvey Beaks	Special thanks

Preceded by Herb Scannell	Nickelodeon president 2006–2018	Succeeded by Brian Robbins
