= Think Fast (1989 game show) =

- Genre: Children's game show; Comedy
- Created by: Robert Mittenthal; Michael Klinghoffer
- Developed by: Geoffrey Darby; Michael Klinghoffer; Robert Mittenthal; Herb Scannell; Byron Taylor
- Directed by: Lexi Rae (1989); Bob Lampel (1990)
- Starring: Michael Carrington; Skip Lackey
- Narrated by: James Eoppolo; Henry J. Waleczko
- Composer: Edd Kalehoff
- Country of origin: United States
- Original language: English
- No. of seasons: 2
- No. of episodes: 106

Production
- Executive producers: Geoffrey Darby; Michael Klinghoffer
- Producers: Robert Mittenthal (1989); Marjorie Cohn (1990)
- Production locations: WHYY-TV Studios Philadelphia, Pennsylvania (1989); Universal Studios Orlando, Florida (1990)

Original release
- Network: Nickelodeon
- Release: May 1, 1989 – March 30, 1990

Think Fast is an American children's game show which aired on Nickelodeon from May 1, 1989, to March 30, 1990, with reruns airing weekly until June 29, 1991.

For the first season, the show was hosted by Michael Carrington, and announced by James Eoppolo. When the show moved to the new Nickelodeon Studios in Orlando, Florida, for season 2, Carrington was replaced by Skip Lackey. While Eoppolo was invited to stay on as announcer, he was contractually obligated to another project by that time, and was replaced by Henry J. Waleczko. The show's theme music was composed by Edd Kalehoff.

Season 1 had 65 episodes taped in Philadelphia, Pennsylvania. The Tampa Tribune initially reported that 45 episodes of season 2 were taped in Orlando, Florida. However, only 41 episodes were produced.

== Gameplay ==
Two teams of two (one of them wearing gold, another wearing blue) competed in various events. The team that completed each stunt won money ($50 for Round 1, $100 for Round 2). In both seasons, it was possible for some events to end in a draw, whether by both teams failing to complete a stunt, or by a tie score. When both teams failed, no money was awarded to either team. With a tie score, the money was awarded to each team. Also in season 1, some events required a team to buzz in when they were done. If a team buzzed in without completing the event properly, the other team won.

=== The Brain Bender ===
After each event, the winners of the event in addition to the cash won a chance to solve a visual puzzle known as the "Brain Bender". In each attempt a puzzle piece was removed. The puzzle could be a picture of a celebrity, a rebus, a close-up object or objects in common. Correctly solving a Brain Bender was worth $200. If the Brain Bender was solved in the first round, another one was started in the second half, still worth $200. If nobody solved the Brain Bender after the final event, or if a tie occurs at the end of the game, a sudden death showdown was played. Originally teams alternated turns taking guesses after each puzzle piece was removed; in later episodes, pieces were removed one at a time until one contestant buzzed in with a correct answer.

The team with the most money at the end of the game won and advanced to the bonus round, the Locker Room.

== Locker Room ==
The Locker Room contained fifteen large lockers, each containing either a costumed character that distracted the contestants by bombarding them with sometimes messy surprises, or a number of themed objects (rubber balls, balloons, or small props which flew out, for example). In season 1, the lockers also contained puppet characters and cannons that blasted confetti when the locker opened. A locker opened, and the contestant then had to find its match. Because of the numerous distractions and surprises that popped out of the lockers when opened, contestants were required to wear helmets, goggles, and knee/elbow pads in the Locker Room. In total, there were seven pairs of characters or objects, as well as an unpaired locker. Each match won a prize.

Every time a contestant pressed a button, the locker corresponding to that button opened up. When a contestant found a match, they had to press a button in the center of the stage that closed all the lockers as well as deactivate the buttons to the matched lockers, as they were already matched and not needed to match again.

=== Season 1 ===
The first contestant had 30 seconds to find as many pairs as they could. The unpaired locker contained a Time Bomb that was "set to go off after 20 seconds". The first contestant had to deactivate the Time Bomb within the first 20 seconds by simply opening the locker containing the Time Bomb. If the first contestant found the time bomb, the second contestant also received 30 seconds to find pairs; however, if the time bomb went off (signaled by its locker opening automatically and an accompanying explosion sound), the second contestant only received 20 seconds. On very early episodes, finding the Time Bomb also added 10 seconds to the second contestant's time for a total of 40 seconds, this rule was dropped after only two or three tapings. Each match on this version was worth increasingly valuable prizes; making six matches won the team a trip. The lockers that were still able to open had the lights off (located on top of the lockers).

=== Season 2 ===
This time, the team took turns for each match, and the team had 60 seconds to find all seven matches. The first four matches the team split $200; the other three matches awarded prizes, with the grand prize being awarded for all seven matches. The unpaired locker contained the "Red Herring", which was simply a character with no match. At some point during the run (after any of the first six matches), the Red Herring's locker was opened. At that point, the contestant had to "yank on the Herring Handle", a cord suspended in the center of the room; the team did not get credit for a match, but they were then able to continue to the next character. When this handle was pulled, a bucket of red plastic fish toys was dropped on the character while his/her door was being locked. The unlocked lockers had lights on (located on the buttons).

== Studios ==
The series was, like all of Nickelodeon's early game shows, taped at WHYY-TV in Philadelphia, Pennsylvania, for its first season. The show relocated to the soon-to-be-opened Universal Studios Florida in Orlando for season 2, where the set received a makeover. The Orlando episodes of the show were taped in January 1990, 5 months before Nickelodeon Studios, as well as the rest of Universal Studios Florida, officially opened, and was the second Nickelodeon game show to tape there (Super Sloppy Double Dare was the first).
