= Geraldine Laybourne =

American entrepreneur and television executive

- Born: Geraldine Bond; May 19, 1947 (age 79); Martinsville, New Jersey, US
- Other name: Gerry Laybourne
- Education: Vassar College; University of Pennsylvania
- Occupations: Entrepreneur, TV executive
- Years active: 1980–present
- Known for: President of Nickelodeon (1984–1996); CEO of Oxygen Media (1998–2007)
- Spouse: Kit Laybourne (m. 1970)
- Children: 2

Geraldine "Gerry" Laybourne (née Bond; born May 19, 1947) is an American entrepreneur and former TV executive. She worked at Nickelodeon from 1980 until 1996, when she became the president of Disney-ABC Cable Networks (including Disney Channel). She is also the co-founder of Oxygen Media and a tech startup called Katapult. In 2020, she was inducted into the Television Hall of Fame.

== Early life and education ==
Laybourne was raised in Martinsville, a rural community of about 400 in Bridgewater Township, New Jersey. She is the second of four children, born to a former radio writer/actress and community organizer and a stock broker. She graduated in 1965 from Bridgewater-Raritan High School.

In 1969, Laybourne earned a Bachelor of Arts degree in Art History from Vassar College. In 1971, she received a Master of Science degree in Elementary Education from the University of Pennsylvania.

== Career ==
After college, Laybourne had various jobs. From 1969 to 1970, Laybourne worked at Wallace, McHarg, Roberts and Todd, an architecture firm in Philadelphia. From 1972 to 1973, she worked as a teacher at Concord Academy in Concord, Massachusetts. Then from 1974 to 1976, Laybourne worked as a festival coordinator of the New York American Film Festival.

In 1974, she co-founded the Media Center for Children, which she was involved with until 1977. Laybourne said she founded the Media Center for Children because she was concerned about the media her children were watching.

From 1978 to 1980, she was a partner at Early Bird Special Company in New York.

=== Nickelodeon (1980–1996) ===
In 1980, Laybourne was hired as a program manager at Nickelodeon, a year-old network with only five employees, where she initiated a focus-group approach to programming.

Laybourne was one of the first people to focus on television programming for kids. She spent 15 years at Nickelodeon, taking over the management of the network, and started accepting advertising for the network, in 1984.

Laybourne and her team were responsible for creating and building the Nickelodeon brand, launching Nick at Nite and expanding the network by establishing it in other countries, developing theme parks and creating Nickelodeon Magazine, movie, toy and publishing divisions.

Under her leadership, Nickelodeon became the top-rated 24-hour cable programming service and won Emmy Awards, Peabody Awards, CableACE Awards and Parents' Choice Awards. The network had a 40% profit margin and explosive growth every year.

By the time she left Nickelodeon in 1996, it was an $8 billion business.

=== Disney (1996–1998) ===
Laybourne left Nickelodeon in 1996 to become president of Disney–ABC Cable Networks, guiding the growth and overseeing the programming of the Disney Channel and represented the corporate interests in Lifetime, A&E, E!, and The History Channel. She led the development of two projects that did not come to fruition: ABC 24 Hour News cable channel and ABZ, an innovative education channel. Laybourne played a role in the creation and management of ABC's Saturday morning children's programming schedule, with the successful launch of One Saturday Morning.

=== Oxygen Media (1998–2007) ===
In 1998, Laybourne left Disney and partnered with Oprah Winfrey and Carsey-Werner Productions to create Oxygen Media, a cable TV company dedicated to creating television and Internet programming for women. She also purchased three women-oriented online services from her former MTV boss, Robert W. Pittman.

On February 2, 2000 (a date which plays off the chemical compound of oxygen—O2/O2), the Oxygen Network premiered to 10 million subscribers.

LVMH was an early investor, but left in 2001 when Laybourne changed strategy from being an Internet company to a television company.

Laybourne initially hired 700 people, but scaled down to 250. The company went on to become profitable in 2004. Microsoft billionaire Paul Allen, who invested in three rounds of Oxygen, forced Oxygen's sale in the late 2007 to NBCUniversal for $925 million. At the end of Laybourne's tenure, Oxygen had 270,000 prime-time weekday viewers in 74 million homes.

=== Mentorship ===
In 2009, Laybourne started the mentoring program Global Women's Mentoring Walks, which pairs established and emerging women professionals to engage in mentoring partnerships in communities across the globe.

=== Boards and memberships ===
- 2014–present Betaworks, Board Member
- 2013–present Katapult, Chairman of the Board, Co-Founder
- 2015–present Vital Voices, Vice Chairman

==== Past positions ====
- 2010–2015: Alloy Media + Marketing, Chairman of the Board
- 2013–2015: Defy Media, Chairman of the Board
- 2007–present: Symantec, Board Member; Compensation Committee
- 1997–present: Vassar College, Board of Trustees; 2010-14: President of the Alumnae/i Association of Vassar College (AAVC); Co-Chair of Vassar Presidential Search Committee
- 2008–2012: Electronic Arts
- 2009–2013: JC Penney
- Kindercare
- Move.com
- Cable Positive, Honorary Chair
- National Cable & Telecommunications Association
- National Council for Families and Television
- New York Women in Film & Television, Advisory Board Member
- The White House Project

== Personal life ==
In 1970, Laybourne married Kit Laybourne, a television producer, entrepreneur, author, and educator. They have been residents of Montclair, New Jersey and have two children and four grandchildren.

Her daughter, Emmy Laybourne, is an author of a series of young adult novels called Monument 14 and is an actress who has appeared in Superstar and other films. Her son Sam is an Emmy-nominated writer and producer on shows such as Black-ish, Arrested Development, Cougar Town, The Michael J. Fox Show and Grandfathered with John Stamos.

== Honors ==
- Advertising Hall of Fame
- Alliance for Women in Media, Genii Award
- Annenberg Public Policy Center, Distinguished Lifetime Contribution to Children and Television Award
- Broadcasting & Cable Hall of Fame
- Cable and Telecommunications Association for Marketing (CTAM), Grand Tam Award
- Creative Coalition, Spotlight Award
- Entrepreneurs Club, Member
- National Academy of Cable Programming, Governor's Award
- 1990: New York Women in Film & Television, Muse Award
- Sara Lee Corporation, Frontrunner Award
- 1991: University of Missouri–Kansas City, Entrepreneur of the Year Award
- 1999: Golden Plate Award of the American Academy of Achievement
- 1996: Time, 25 Most Influential people in America
- 1996: The Hollywood Reporter, 50 Most Influential Women in the Entertainment Industry, rank #1
- 2004: The Cable Center, Hall of Fame
- 2005: Paley Center for Media, She Made It
- 2020: Television Hall of Fame
- Women in Cable Award
- Women in Communications (New York), Matrix Award for Broadcasting

== Works and publications ==
- Laybourne, Geraldine (1993). "Chapter 23: The Nickelodeon Experience". In Berry, Gordon L; Asamen, Joy K (Keiko) (eds.). Children & Television: Images in a Changing Sociocultural World. Thousand Oaks: SAGE Publications, Inc. pp. 303–307. ISBN 978-1-483-32622-1. OCLC 918558971.

Preceded by Cy Schneider	Nickelodeon president 1984–1996	Succeeded by Herb Scannell
