= The Big Help =

- Created by: Nickelodeon
- Presented by: Marc Summers; Jonathan Taylor Thomas; Rosie O'Donnell
- Country of origin: United States

Production
- Executive producers: Albie Hecht; Robert Small

Original release
- Network: Nickelodeon
- Release: 1994 – 2001

Related
- The Big Green Help (2008); The Big Help (2010 revival)

The Big Help is a community outreach program created by Nickelodeon in 1994. The program featured children who volunteered in their community and reached out to let Nickelodeon know what they were doing. The network contacted some of them to create commercials for Nickelodeon about various volunteer opportunities to inspire other children to be big helpers in their communities.

There was also an event in which children from around the country would call in to try to get one of their local parks refurbished by Nickelodeon, the ten with the most votes would get refurbished by Nickelodeon in an eight-hour special. In 2001, following the September 11 attacks, Nickelodeon aired unscheduled specials under The Big Help branding for relief. In 2008, a sequel emerged called The Big Green Help, which was created to promote messages of environmentalism. The name The Big Help was restored in 2010. The program was silently discontinued in the mid-2010s.

== Stars ==
- Lucas Cruikshank
- Larisa Oleynik
- Katelyn Tarver
- Jake Weary
- Matt Shively
- David Del Rio
- Nathan Kress
- Jennette McCurdy
- Keke Palmer
- Lindsey Shaw
- Drake Bell
- Matt Bennett
- Austin Butler
- James Maslow
- Skyler Day
- Gia Mantegna
- Avan Jogia
- Gage Golightly
- Isabella Castillo
- Devon Werkheiser
- Miranda Cosgrove
- Matthew Underwood
- Ciara Bravo
- Malese Jow
- Victoria Justice
- Leon Thomas III
- Spencer Locke
- Erin Sanders
- Grace Gummer
- Carlos Pena Jr.
- Drew Roy
- Nick Purcell
- Simon Curtis
- Noah Munck
- Tanya Chisholm
- Logan Henderson
- Matthew Moy
- Kendré Berry
- Elizabeth Gillies
- Robbie Amell
- Tyler James Williams
- Ashley Argota
- Jolene Purdy
- Daniella Monet
- Laura Marano
- Ariana Grande
- Annamarie Kenoyer
- Shayna Rose
- Teala Dunn
- Tristin Mays
- Valerie Tian
- Taylor Parks
- Amanda Bynes
- Aaliyah
