= Nickelodeon Guts =

American children's game show

- Also known as: GUTS (Note: Seasons 1–3); Global GUTS (Note: Season 4 only)
- Genre: Game show Sports
- Created by: Albie Hecht; Scott Fishman; Byron Taylor
- Written by: Magda Liolis; Albie Hecht
- Directed by: Jim Dusel
- Starring: Mike O'Malley; Moira Quirk
- Narrated by: Mike O'Malley; Moira Quirk
- Composer: Rick Witkowski for Studio L
- Country of origin: United States
- Original language: English
- No. of seasons: 4
- No. of episodes: 160

Production
- Executive producers: Albie Hecht; Andy Bamberger
- Producer: Christine Woods
- Production locations: Nickelodeon Studios, Universal Studios; Orlando, Florida
- Running time: 30-38 minutes
- Production companies: Chauncey Street Productions, Inc.; Nickelodeon Productions

Original release
- Network: Nickelodeon
- Release: September 19, 1992 – December 10, 1995

Related
- My Family's Got Guts

Nickelodeon Guts (stylized as Nickelodeon GUTS) is an American television action sports competition series hosted by American actor/writer Mike O'Malley and officiated by British actress Moira "Mo" Quirk who also served as the show's co-host. The series originally ran from 1992 to 1995 on Nickelodeon.

Each episode features three young athletes competing against each other in four extreme versions of athletic events culminating in a fifth and final round which set the three competitors on a race up an artificial mountain to decide the victor.

== Production ==
The series was filmed at Sound Stage 21 at Universal Studios Florida on a set dubbed the "Extreme Arena". This arena consists of a turf playing field, a pool, a racing track, an obstacle course and the Aggro Crag.

Season 1 began taping on August 12, 1992.

Reruns were shown on Nickelodeon from December 11, 1995, until February 28, 1999, before moving to Nick GAS from March 1, 1999, until the station ceased broadcasting on December 31, 2007 (April 23, 2009, on Dish Network). It has occasionally been seen in reruns on TeenNick since January 1, 2008. Since 2011, those reruns aired on the channel's NickSplat block on an occasional basis. Pluto TV's Nick Games channel showed reruns of 4 episodes in 2019, but Pluto TV removed the channel in 2020 after a major overhaul of the channel lineup. As of 2022, the show now airs as part of a Nick Games block on Pluto TV channel 1016, "No Parents Allowed".

In 2008, Nickelodeon produced two seasons of a revival of the program, My Family's Got GUTS.

== Gameplay ==
On each half-hour episode, three young athletes within the ages of 11 to 15 where they participate in designated colors (blue, red, and purple) compete against each other in four events that are based on "extreme" versions of skills in popular sports, such as basketball, baseball, football, and soccer. While most of these events include the use of an elastic harness, others make use of a wave pool, and sometimes a racing track is used. During the show's run, more creative and ambitious events were developed, even including a fabricated ski slope.

The competitors are awarded points based on their comparative performance in each event. First place in each event is worth 300 points. Second place receives 200 points, and third place earns 100 points. In general, in case of a tie, the players involved each receive the higher placing and points, however, if two or more players are disqualified, fail to finish, or fail to score, they each receive third place points. The player with the most points after all five events won the game and received a gold GUTS medal and a faux glowing piece of the Aggro Crag. Second place received a silver medal and third received a bronze medal.

The contestants are introduced in the breaks between events in a segment dubbed "Spill Your GUTS". The segment was done as an interview with one of the hosts in the first two seasons (O'Malley in season 1 and Quirk in season 2), and was subsequently a prerecorded segment. In seasons 3 and 4, the contestants introduced themselves. Season 3 was taking place inside the studio; in Global GUTS, the segment was expanded to at least thirty seconds longer began a flag of the player's country was shown, followed by the contestant introducing themselves which took place outdoors. Then, the location where the contestant is from was shown on a map, followed by them giving more information about what they do. Non-English speaking contestants introduced themselves in their native language, with an English-language voiceover dubbed over their voices.

== The Crag ==
The fifth and final event of each episode pits the three players in a race to climb a fabricated mountain called the Aggro Crag (seasons 1-2) the Mega Crag (season 3), or the Super Aggro Crag (Global GUTS).

The object of the Crag was for all three players to race to the peak of the mountain, while hitting a series of actuators (buttons that illuminated a light beacon when pressed) along the way to the peak. If a player misses any of the actuators along the way, a spotter at the top (referred to as the "Crag Troll") prevented that player from completing the climb until they returned and activated whatever targets they missed. Each player had a separate, but identical side of the mountain to climb, and was not permitted to cross into their opponents' paths or disrupt their progress. The climb is made more difficult by strobe lights simulating "lightning", foam rock "avalanches", flying "snow" in the form of glitter and confetti, "slime floods" in the form of green glitter, and "nuclear flying crystals" in the form of ballpit balls that are each triggered either at random or when the players stepped on specific switchbacks on the crag. The first player to successfully activate all of their actuators, including the final one at the peak, earns 725 points. The second and third-place earn 550 and 375 points, respectively.

A number of violations/errors on the Crag resulted in a player automatically receiving third place points, including:

- Crossing into another player's section of the mountain
- Hitting someone else's actuators (excluding the final actuator)
- Reaching the top of the mountain by grabbing a hand rail
- Making a false start at the beginning of the climb
- Finishing the climb without lighting all of one's own actuators
- Not stepping on all of the boulders in the Crag's "Boulder Canyon" section (Boulder Canyon was introduced in season 2 of GUTS)

The increased point structure in the final event allows players overcome a deficit of as much as 300 points to win, despite earlier mistakes. The point structure for the Crag eliminates the possibility of a tie except in the unlikely event that two players who are already tied are each disqualified during the Crag and therefore both receive third-place points. While dual-disqualifications did occur during the show's run, it never resulted in a tie.

The sound design for the action on the Aggro Crag was created by Nickelodeon Senior Sound Designer Mark Schultz, who converted the voltages supplied by the infrared actuator "eyes" to triggers read by a MIDI-based sampler.

The total height of the Aggro Crag was 28 feet (8.5 m). For the Mega Crag, as well as the Super Aggro Crag on Global GUTS, the total height was 30 feet (9.1 m) tall.

== Series variations ==
=== Nickelodeon GUTS All-Stars ===
The highest possible score for a contestant was 1,925 points and was attained several times throughout the show's run. On August 21, 1993, at the start of the show's second season, Nickelodeon aired a one-hour special known as Nickelodeon GUTS All-Stars, where three best contestants from the previous season, Mike "Superman" Schmidt, Jana "The Warrior" Waring, and Kelli "The Maniac" Marchewka, who achieved 1,925 points, competed against each other for a college scholarship and a special GUTS All-Star trophy. The one-hour special featured seven events plus the Aggro Crag. This special also debuted five new events, which were later introduced in the second season, and an extended version of Basic Training, appearing only in this special. In the award ceremony, each contestant received a Nickelodeon GUTS All-Stars plate along with prize money for college scholarship. Third place received a $1,000 college scholarship, second place received a $1,500 college scholarship and the winner received a $2,500 college scholarship.

In 1994, Sony Wonder released a VHS based on the special, which featured special guest commentaries by Super Bowl Champion Lawrence Taylor.

=== Global GUTS ===
For the show's final season, Nickelodeon turned Guts into Global Guts, featuring competitors from various countries, namely the United States, Mexico, Great Britain, Israel, Germany, Spain, Portugal, and the Commonwealth of Independent States (referred to simply as "C.I.S." on air, consisting of Georgia, Kazakhstan, Russia, and Ukraine). Although each country had multiple contestants, no country was ever represented twice in a single episode, except for the Special Olympic episode, which featured two U.S. contestants. Each country had its own team of broadcasters, with O'Malley retained this role for the US broadcast and Quirk retained her officiating role. The format remained identical to the original version, but the Mega Crag was upgraded to the Super Aggro Crag. In the "Spill Your GUTS" segments, non-English-speaking contestants spoke in their own language, with an interpreter speaking over their lines.

Taping of Global GUTS took place from July 12, 1995, to August 15, 1995, and episodes began airing September 5, 1995, as part of Nick in the Afternoon.

Medal presentations were also accompanied by the raising of flags and the playing of the national anthem of the winning country, and a victory lap by all three contestants, draped in the flags of their home countries. A medal count was also tabulated at the beginning of each episode, similar to the Olympics.

In addition to airing on Nickelodeon in the United States, the program was shown in represented countries on the following networks:

- Germany: Nickelodeon
- Israel: Arutz HaYeladim (as part of the "Nickelodeon Time" programming block)
- Mexico: MVS Multivisión
- Portugal: SIC
- Russia (C.I.S.): ?
- Spain: TVE
- Ukraine (C.I.S.): Ukrainian Television Network
- United Kingdom (Great Britain): Nickelodeon UK

In addition to countries not actually represented in the games:

- Brazil: Nickelodeon
- Indonesia: ANteve
- Japan: Nickelodeon

=== My Family's Got Guts ===
A revival of the show, My Family's Got Guts, debuted on September 15, 2008, filmed at Universal Studios Florida as was the original (but due to it already being occupied, not on the same sound stage as the original). This version was hosted by Ben Lyons, along with Australian celebrity Asha Kuerten as the referee. Unlike the original, it followed a bracket tournament format featuring two families competing as teams per episode, with points earned being used to provide a head start for the winning team during the Aggro Crag rather than determine the winners of the episode.

== Video game ==
In November 1994, a video game based on the series was developed and published by Viacom New Media exclusively for the Super NES. One or two players may compete in many of the events that debuted in the TV show, including the Aggro Crag. The game is based on the actual footage of the show and contains filmed contestants. Nintendo Power praised the game's graphics, but criticized the poor control. The game will be re-released for modern consoles by Limited Run Games alongside Rocko's Modern Life: Spunky's Dangerous Day (1994) and Aaahh!!! Real Monsters (1995) in the collection Nickelodeon Splat Pack.
