= Herb Scannell =

American television executive

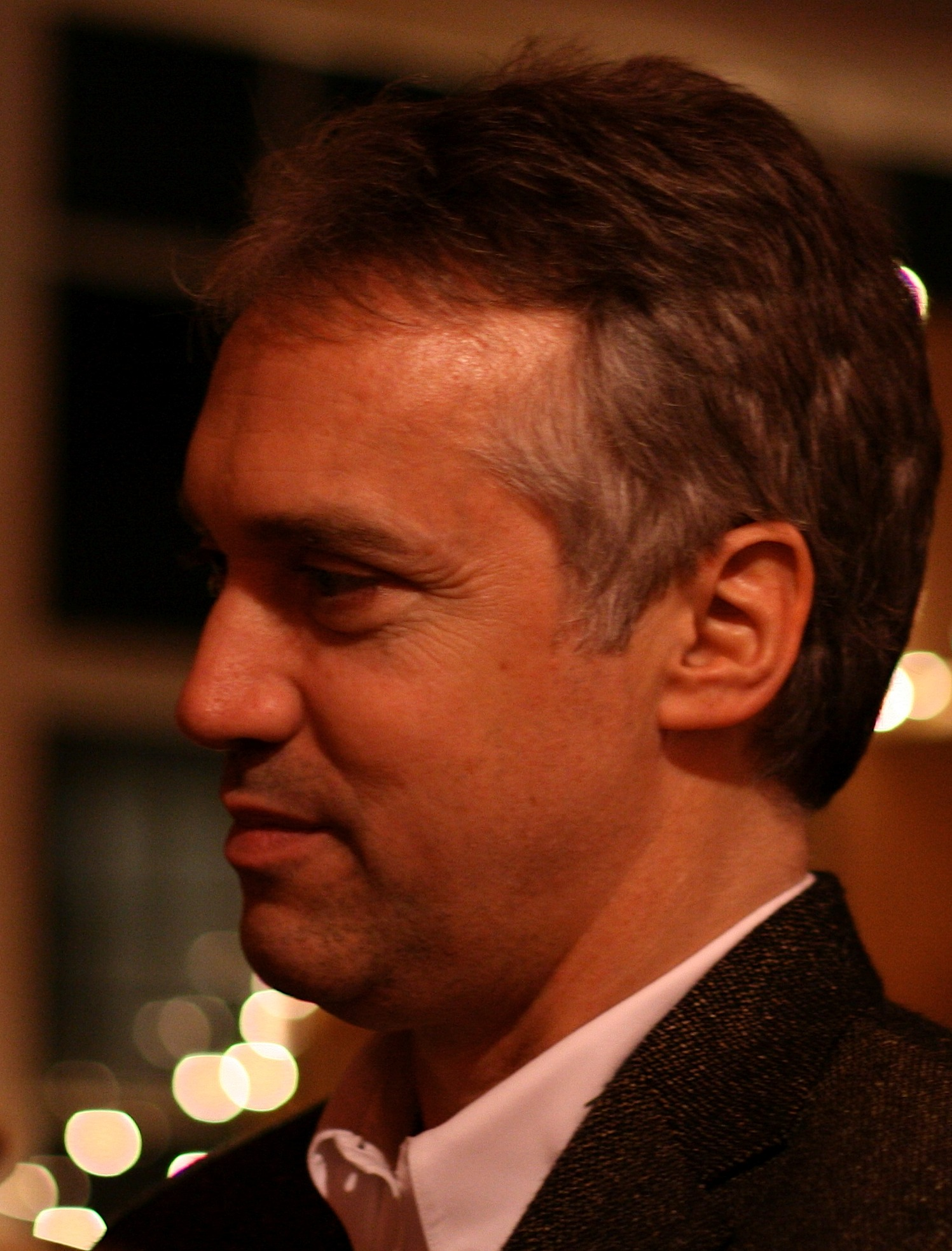
- Born: January 11, 1957 (age 69); Long Island, New York, U.S.
- Occupation: Media executive
- Years active: 1980–present

Herb Scannell (born January 11, 1957) is an American media executive and businessman. He was the president of Nickelodeon and TV Land from 1996 to 2006, was the founding CEO of Next New Networks, and the president of BBC Worldwide America. He was the CEO of the Mitú Network until the Summer 2018. He became the president and chief executive officer of KPCC-FM in January 2019. In September 2023, he announced his retirement from that position.

== Early life and education ==
Scannell was born on Long Island in New York to an Irish father from Boston and Puerto Rican mother. He is the youngest of four. He received his primary and secondary education in his hometown. His mother taught him Spanish at home, helping him to become fluent in both English and Spanish. As a child he would spend every summer with his Puerto Rican family on the island, becoming very attached to his Hispanic roots.

Scannell graduated from high school in 1975 and entered Boston College. As a student he became the manager of WZBC (the campus' radio station). He graduated in 1979 with a Bachelor's degree in English.

== Career ==
Scannell was hired by WHN Radio (New York) in 1980, before joining the cable television industry in 1981 at The Movie Channel before it merged with Showtime, and eventually worked his way up to the position of director of program promotion for Showtime/The Movie Channel.

In March 1988, Scannell joined Nickelodeon as director of programming, overseeing program scheduling. In 1989, he was named vice president for Nickelodeon. He oversaw the development and launch of Nick News. In 1990, he was executive vice president for Nickelodeon Network and U.S. Television. He oversaw the direction of Nickelodeon and Nick at Nite cable networks. He was also fundamental in the development of Nick Jr. and Nicktoons.

=== President of Nickelodeon ===
In February 1996, he was named president of Nickelodeon and TV Land, succeeding Geraldine Laybourne. Under his leadership, Nickelodeon (which, under his watch, included such series as My Life as a Teenage Robot, Danny Phantom, The Fairly OddParents, Avatar: The Last Airbender, SpongeBob SquarePants, The Wild Thornberrys, Figure it Out, Hey Arnold!, The Angry Beavers and Kenan & Kel) and TV Land became the highest-rated cable networks launched within the past seven years. Nickelodeon also expanded to other areas such as live theatrical shows, magazines and feature films. He was also responsible for launching Dora the Explorer, The Brothers García (which is based on Los García, a show he used to watch in Puerto Rico) and Taina.

=== Later years ===
On August 22, 2005, he participated in "The State of Hispanic America National Conference" as a member of the Executive Roundtable. In January 2007, Scannell became the founding CEO of Next New Networks, a new media company of micro-television networks distributed through internet technology that helped establish the concept of the multi-channel network; the company had 2010's #1 and #2 YouTube videos in the world. Co-founders include Emil Rensing, Fred Seibert, Timothy Shey, and Jed Simmons. The company's lead partner was Spark Capital. The company's first group of networks include VOD Cars, Fast Lane Daily, and Channel Frederator.

In June 2010, Scannell became the president of BBC Worldwide America. Scannell left in 2015 and Ann Sarnoff succeeded him.

In 2017, Scannell became CEO of Mitú (entertainment) a media company serving the Latin community.

In 2019, Scannell became CEO of Southern California Public Radio. Under his leadership, KPCC rebranded to “LAist 89.3,” mirroring the name of the website LAist, which SCPR acquired in 2018. SCPR also launched LAist Studios in 2019. In 2023, Scannell announced his retirement, following his tenure at Southern California Public Radio .

== Personal life ==
Scannell lives in New York City with his wife. He has two daughters.

== Awards and recognitions ==
Among the many awards and recognitions which he received are:

- CTAM Awards
- BPME Awards
- NAMIC Vision and Image Award (2001)
- Profile in Latino Leaders Magazine (2004)
- Amnesty International Award (2004)

== See also ==
- List of Puerto Ricans

Preceded by Geraldine Laybourne	Nickelodeon president 1996–2006	Succeeded by Cyma Zarghami
