= Nickelodeon Games and Sports for Kids =

Defunct American television channel

- Country: United States
- Broadcast area: Nationwide
- Headquarters: Los Angeles, California, U.S.

Programming
- Language: English

Ownership
- Owner: Viacom
- Parent: MTV Networks
- Sister channels: Nickelodeon; Nicktoons; Noggin; Nick Jr.

History
- Launched: March 1, 1999; 27 years ago
- Closed: December 31, 2007; 18 years ago (most providers); April 23, 2009; 17 years ago (on Dish)
- Replaced by: The N (most providers); Cartoon Network (West feed) (on Dish)

Links
- Website: www.nickgas.com (archived March 20, 2004)

Nickelodeon Games and Sports for Kids (stylized as either Nick GaS or Nickelodeon GaS and commonly known as Nick GAS) was an American cable television network that was part of MTV Networks' suite of digital cable channels. The channel was primarily oriented towards game shows and sport-related programming targeting a youth audience, much of which drawn from Nickelodeon library programming (including classic Nickelodeon game shows such as Double Dare and Nickelodeon Guts). Nick GAS also featured interstitial segments, such as sports highlights and interviews with figures such as athletes.

By 2005, the channel's schedule had become largely automated. On December 31, 2007, Nick GAS was shut down by Viacom in favor of a 24-hour The N channel (spun off from its preschool-oriented channel Noggin), which itself would later relaunch as the TeenNick channel in 2009.

The VP/General Manager of the network was Nickelodeon executive Mark Offitzer, producer of numerous Nickelodeon specials including the Kids' Choice Awards. Summer Sanders was named on-air commissioner of the network; Dave Aizer (1999–2003) and Vivianne Collins (1999–2003) were the network's original on-air hosts, with Mati Moralejo (2001–05) joining soon after and later on Nadine (2004) and George (2004) separately during commercials.

== History ==
Nickelodeon Games and Sports for Kids (or Nickelodeon GAS) was announced on November 3, 1998. The channel had been in development for months as Nickelodeon conducted research among children to determine their sports-related interests.

Nick GAS launched on March 1, 1999. Olympic skater Tara Lipinski joined the new network as a special host and sports correspondent. At the time of its launch, Nick GAS reached less than a million of the over 70 million cable and satellite subscribers in the U.S. However, it soon became one of the most sought-after channels among cable operators. Its programming primarily consisted of children's game shows and sports-related programs from parent network Nickelodeon.

Nick GAS also produced its own original programming, such as Play to Z, Gamefarm and Splash TV. GAS also featured original blocks Camp GAS during the summer, Double Dare Double Play (both removed in 2004), and Pumping GAS (removed in 2005).

In place of commercials, Nick GAS aired interstitial segments, which were produced at Nickelodeon on Sunset in Los Angeles and Nickelodeon Studios at Universal Studios Florida, promos for Nick GAS original programming also aired during commercial breaks. However, in-show advertising (like consolation and grand prizes of the network's shows) were left intact, as it was part of the show itself.

The studio segments in the "GAS Garage" often included competitions between families, or interviews with athletes and other celebrities. Programs were usually grouped together in the blocks Heads Up!, Wild Card, Family Fuel, Extreme GAS (all removed in 2002) and aired during commercial breaks. Other interstitials included "Heroes of the Game", "GAS Grill", "Trade Tricks", "Time Out", T.U.M.E.G., "Skill Drill", " The MLS Play of the Week", "Global GAS", "Home Turf Highlights", "Let's Just Play", "In Play Today", "All Access", "FastBreak", "GasCaster Report", and in the early years of the network "This Day in Sports History".

From October 31, 2005, onwards, Nick GAS's programming was fully automated, putting seven shows on a permanent timeslot (GUTS, Legends of the Hidden Temple, Figure It Out, Get the Picture, Double Dare 2000, Nick Arcade and Finders Keepers) and regular segments. In September 2006, Finders Keepers was removed from the network, leaving only six shows on the channel in its last years.

=== Shutdown ===
On August 13, 2007, Viacom announced that it would split Noggin's teen-oriented block, The N, into a standalone channel on December 31, allowing Noggin to focus strictly on commercial-free preschool programming. The N would take over the transponder home to Nick GAS, which would transition into a section of programmes on the TurboNick platform on Nick.com.

The change took place as planned on that date, with The N taking over from Nick GAS on most satellite and cable providers. Due to technical issues, Nick GAS remained in operation as a fully automated service on Dish Network, with Noggin and The N remaining as timeshared services on Noggin's slot.

On April 23, 2009, Nick GAS's slot was replaced entirely with the west coast feed of Cartoon Network. This was done to allow The N to launch on Dish and to allow Noggin to broadcast 24 hours as part of the preparations of their relaunches as TeenNick and Nick Jr. respectively.

=== Pluto TV revival as NickGames ===
On November 19, 2019, Viacom announced the addition of several new networks to its Pluto TV video streaming service, including a new network called NickGames. The network featured much of the older Nickelodeon game show programming carried by Nick GAS, along with newer Nickelodeon competition and reality programming produced after Nick GAS's shutdown. The network was removed on August 18, 2020. A similarly formatted channel existed under the title of No Parents Allowed, which included Nickelodeon and non-Nickelodeon shows, however was quietly shut down among other kids networks on June 5, 2025.

== Programs ==
Most of the programming on GAS consisted of Nickelodeon game shows from the 1980s to the early 2000s, making up a library of 1,000 hours. Such programs included Double Dare, Nickelodeon Guts, Figure It Out, Wild & Crazy Kids, and Sports Theater starring Shaquille O'Neal. The network also carried Renford Rejects from Nickelodeon's UK network, and the television version of Sports Illustrated for Kids originally aired by CBS.

In its early years, Nick GAS signed deals with several sports associations which would provide exclusive game coverage and short features. Nick GAS also aired non-game programming such as Salute Your Shorts, Speed Racer X, and Rocket Power (all of which mainly involved extreme sports and competition).

The network also aired a one-hour block of video game programming on Saturday nights from 2003 to 2004. Play to Z (mainly re-purposed content from the UK-based Game Network) and Gamefarm (an original series featuring video game news and competitions) aired during this time. Nick GAS also acquired reruns of Nickelodeon Robot Wars, a program adapted from the UK original.
