= 14th Youth in Film Awards =

1993 US media awards ceremony

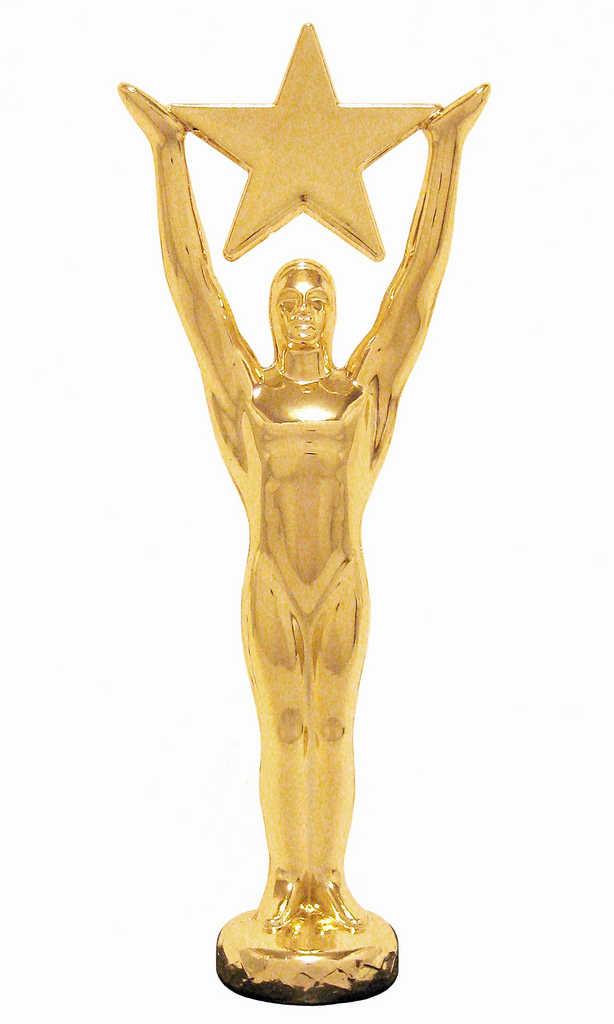
- Awarded for: Achievement in the 1991—1992
- Date: January 16, 1993
- Site: Sportsmen's Lodge; Studio City, California
- Hosted by: Mayim Bialik and Thora Birch

The 14th Youth in Film Awards ceremony (now known as the Young Artist Awards), presented by the Youth in Film Association, honored outstanding youth performers under the age of 21 in the fields of film, television, theater and music for the 1991–1992 season, and took place on January 16, 1993, at the Sportsmen's Lodge in Studio City, California.

Established in 1978 by long-standing Hollywood Foreign Press Association member, Maureen Dragone, the Youth in Film Association was the first organization to establish an awards ceremony specifically set to recognize and award the contributions of performers under the age of 21 in the fields of film, television, theater and music.

== Categories ==
★ Bold indicates the winner in each category.

== Best Young Performer in a Motion Picture ==
=== Best Young Actor Starring in a Motion Picture ===
★ Elijah Wood - Radio Flyer (Columbia Pictures)

- Jonathan Brandis - Ladybugs (Paramount Pictures)
- Christopher Castile - Beethoven (Universal Studios)
- Christian Coleman - South Central (Warner Bros.)
- Stephen Dorff - The Power of One (Warner Bros.)
- Joshua John Miller - And You Thought Your Parents Were Weird (Trimark Pictures)
- Robert Oliveri - Honey, I Blew Up the Kid (Walt Disney Pictures)
- Ethan Randall Embry - All I Want for Christmas (Paramount Pictures)
- Benjamin Salisbury - Captain Ron (Touchstone Pictures)

=== Best Young Actress Starring in a Motion Picture ===
★ Alisan Porter - Curly Sue (Warner Bros)

- Thora Birch - All I Want for Christmas (Paramount Pictures)
- Samantha Mathis - This is My Life (20th Century Fox)
- Christina Ricci - The Addams Family (Paramount Pictures)
- Meadow Sisto - Captain Ron (Touchstone Pictures)
- Nicholle Tom - Beethoven (Universal Pictures)

=== Best Young Actor Co-Starring in a Motion Picture ===
★ Jimmy Workman - The Addams Family (Paramount)

- Dante Basco - Hook (TriStar Pictures)
- Kieran Culkin - Father of the Bride (Touchstone)
- Simon Fenton - The Power of One (Warner Bros)
- Edan Gross - And You Thought Your Parents Were Weird (Trimark Pictures)
- Charlie Korsmo - Hook (TriStar Pictures)
- Jason Marsden - Mr. Saturday Night (Columbia Pictures)
- David Tom - Stay Tuned (Warner Bros)
- Andy Voils - The Babe (Universal Pictures)

=== Best Young Actress Co-Starring in a Motion Picture ===
★ Courtney Peldon - Out on a Limb (Universal Pictures)

- A.J. Langer - And You Thought Your Parents Were Weird (Trimark Pictures)
- Heather McComb - Stay Tuned (Warner Bros)
- Marguerite Moreau - The Mighty Ducks (Walt Disney)
- Keri Russell - Honey, I Blew Up the Kid (Walt Disney)
- Vinessa Shaw - Ladybugs (Paramount Pictures)
- Vanessa Zaoui - Alan & Naomi (PorchLight Entertainment)

=== Best Young Actor Under 10 in a Motion Picture ===
★ Joseph Gordon-Levitt - A River Runs Through It (Columbia Pictures)

- Raushan Hammond - Hook (TriStar Pictures)
- Miko Hughes - Jack the Bear (20th Century Fox)
- Joseph Mazzello - Radio Flyer (Columbia Pictures)
- Guy Witcher - The Power of One (Warner Bros)

=== Best Young Actress Under 10 in a Motion Picture ===
★ Nancy Moore Atchison - Fried Green Tomatoes (Universal Pictures)

- Thora Birch - Patriot Games (Paramount Pictures)
- Gaby Hoffmann - This is My Life (20th Century Fox)
- Sarah Rose Karr - Beethoven (Universal Studios)
- Amber Scott - Hook (TriStar Pictures)
- Madeline Zima - The Hand That Rocks the Cradle (Hollywood Pictures)

== Best Young Performer in a Television Movie ==
=== Best Young Actor in a Television Movie ===
★ Bumper Robinson - The Jacksons: An American Dream (ABC)

- Kenny Blank - Carolina Skeletons (NBC)
- Chris Demetral - Jonathan: The Boy Nobody Wanted (NBC)
- Joshua Harris - Locked Up: A Mother's Rage (CBS)
- Michael Landes - Please, God, I'm Only Seventeen (CBS)
- Matthew Lawrence - With a Vengeance (CBS)
- Jesse Tendler - The Secret (CBS)

=== Best Young Actress in a Television Movie ===
★ Ariana Richards - Locked Up: A Mother's Rage (CBS)

- Dana Barron - Jonathan: The Boy Nobody Wanted (NBC)
- Ellen Blain - In My Daughter's Name (CBS)
- Olivia Burnette - Willing to Kill: The Texas Cheerleader Story (ABC)
- Anndi McAfee - When No One Would Listen (CBS)
- Lexi Randall - In the Best Interest of the Children (NBC)
- Reese Witherspoon - Desperate Choices: To Save My Child (NBC)

=== Best Young Actor in a Cable Movie ===
★ Martin Gardner - Memphis (TNT)

- Chris Demetral - Sometimes They Come Back (CBS)
- Aeryk Egan - Keeper of the City (20th Century Fox)
- David Tom - Stepfather III (HBO)
- Jimmy Workman - Christmas in Connecticut

=== Best Young Actress in a Cable Movie ===
★ Amy Stewart - Mark Twain and Me (Disney Channel)

- Shiri Appleby - Perfect Family (USA Network)
- Juliana Ashley Hansen - Perfect Family (USA Network)
- Kaley Cuoco - Quicksand: No Escape (USA Network)
- Tothany Reynolds - Memphis (TNT)
- Ariana Richards - Timescape (Showtime)

=== Best Young Actor Under 10 in a Television Movie ===
★ Sam Gifaldi - Child of Rage (CBS)

- Robert Hy Gorman - Deception: A Mother's Secret (NBC)
- John Kidwell - The President's Child (CBS)
- Joseph Mazzello - Desperate Choices: To Save My Child (NBC)
- Courtland Mead - A Child Lost Forever: The Jerry Sherwood Story (NBC)
- Michael Spears - The Broken Cord (ABC)

=== Best Young Actress Under 10 in a Television Movie ===
★ Ashley Peldon - Child of Rage (CBS)

- Lacey Chabert - A Little Piece of Heaven (NBC)
- Kimberly Cullum - Grave Secrets: The Legacy of Hilltop Drive (CBS)
- Caroline Dollar - A Mother's Right: The Elizabeth Morgan Story (ABC)
- Lindsey Haun - Desperate Rescue: The Cathy Mahone Story (NBC)
- Sarah Martineck - Locked Up: A Mother's Rage (CBS)
- Genelle Templeton - Fatal Memories (NBC)

== Best Young Performer in a Television Series ==
=== Best Young Actor Starring in a Television Series ===
★ Jeremy London - I'll Fly Away (NBC)

- Zachery Ty Bryan - Home Improvement (ABC)
- Corey Carrier - The Young Indiana Jones Chronicles (ABC)
- Christopher Castile - Step by Step (ABC)
- Danny Gerard - Brooklyn Bridge (CBS)
- Jeremy Jackson - Baywatch (Syndication)
- Jonathan Taylor Thomas - Home Improvement (ABC)

=== Best Young Actress Starring in a Television Series ===
★ Ashlee Levitch - I'll Fly Away (NBC)

- Olivia Burnette - The Torkelsons (NBC)
- Candace Cameron - Full House (ABC)
- Nicole Eggert - Baywatch (Syndication)
- Christine Lakin - Step by Step (ABC)
- Kellie Martin - Life Goes On (ABC)
- Angela Watson - Step by Step (ABC)

=== Outstanding Young Comedian in a Television Series ===
★ Joey Lawrence - Blossom (NBC)

- Brandon Call - Step by Step (ABC)
- David Faustino - Married... with Children (FOX)
- Jay R. Ferguson - Evening Shade (CBS)
- Darius McCrary - Family Matters (CBS)
- Corin Nemec - Parker Lewis Can't Lose (FOX)

=== Outstanding Young Comedienne in a Television Series ===
★ Sara Gilbert - Roseanne (ABC)

- Tatyana M. Ali - The Fresh Prince of Bel-Air (NBC)
- Mayim Bialik - Blossom (NBC)
- Jodie Sweetin - Full House (ABC)
- Kellie Shanygne Williams - Family Matters (CBS)

=== Best Young Actor Starring in a Cable Series ===
★ Chris Demetral - Dream On (HBO)

- Danny Cooksey - Salute Your Shorts (Nickelodeon)
- Richard Ian Cox - The New Adventures of the Black Stallion (Family Channel)
- Rick Galloway - Welcome Freshmen (Nickelodeon)
- Chris Lobban - Welcome Freshmen (Nickelodeon)
- Chris William Martin - Fifteen (YTV/Nickelodeon)
- Avi Phillips - Maniac Mansion (Family Channel)
- David Rhoden - Welcome Freshmen (Nickelodeon)

=== Best Young Actress Starring in a Cable Series ===
★ Melissa Joan Hart - Clarissa Explains It All (Nickelodeon)

- Laura Harris - Fifteen (YTV/Nickelodeon)
- Sarah Polley - Road to Avonlea (CBC/Disney Channel)
- Robyn Ross - Fifteen (YTV/Nickelodeon)
- Jill Setter - Welcome Freshmen (Nickelodeon)
- Jocelyn Steiner - Welcome Freshmen (Nickelodeon)

=== Best Young Actor in a New Television Series ===
★ Christopher Babers - Rhythm & Blues (NBC)

- Justin Burnette - Hearts Afire (CBS)
- Joseph Gordon-Levitt - The Powers That Be (NBC)
- Pee Wee Love - Here and Now (NBC)
- Tobey Maguire - Great Scott! (FOX)
- Justin Shenkarow - Picket Fences (CBS)
- Billy L. Sullivan - The Golden Palace (CBS)
- Shaun Weiss - Here and Now (NBC)

=== Best Young Actress in a New Television Series ===
★ Holly Marie Combs - Picket Fences (CBS)

- Sarah Michelle Gellar - Swans Crossing (Syndication)
- Meghann Haldeman - Camp Wilder (ABC)
- Sarah Koskoff - Great Scott! (FOX)
- Heidi Lenhart - California Dreams (NBC)
- Hilary Swank - Camp Wilder (ABC)

=== Best Young Actor in an Off-Primetime Series ===
★ Mario Lopez - Saved by the Bell (NBC)

- Zachary Bostrom - Harry and the Hendersons (FOX)
- Robert Gavin - Land of the Lost (ABC)
- Mark-Paul Gosselaar - Saved by the Bell (NBC)
- Shane McDermott - Swans Crossing (Syndication)
- Ryan O'Neill - California Dreams (NBC)
- Eddie Robinson - Swans Crossing (Syndication)
- Fred Savage- The Wonder Years (NBC)
- Josh Saviano- The Wonder Years (NBC)

=== Best Young Actress in an Off-Primetime Series ===
★ Lark Voorhies - Saved by the Bell (NBC)

- Elizabeth Berkley - Saved by the Bell (NBC)
- Brittany Daniel - Swans Crossing (Syndication)
- Jenny Drugan - Land of the Lost (ABC)
- Sarah Michelle Gellar - Swans Crossing (Syndication)
- Courtney Peldon - Harry and the Hendersons (FOX)
- Carol-Anne Plante - Harry and the Hendersons (FOX)
- Tiffani-Amber Thiessen - Saved by the Bell (NBC)
- Danica McKellar- The Wonder Years (NBC)

=== Best Young Actor Co-Starring in a Television Series ===
★ Adam LaVorgna - Brooklyn Bridge (CBS)

- Kevin Connolly - Great Scott! (FOX)
- Kaj-Erik Eriksen - The Commish (ABC)
- Shawn Harrison - Family Matters (CBS)
- David Lascher - Blossom (NBC)
- Josh Saviano - The Wonder Years (ABC)
- Troy W. Slaten - Parker Lewis Can't Lose (FOX)

=== Best Young Actress Co-Starring in a Television Series ===
★ Jenna von Oÿ - Blossom (NBC)

- Andrea Barber - Full House (ABC)
- Maia Brewton - Parker Lewis Can't Lose (FOX)
- Candace Hutson - Evening Shade (CBS)
- Jenny Lewis - Brooklyn Bridge (CBS)
- Danica McKellar - The Wonder Years (ABC)

=== Best Young Actor Co-Starring in a Cable Series ===
★ Michael Bower - Salute Your Shorts (Nickelodeon)

- Andrew Bednarski - Rin Tin Tin: K-9 Cop (CTV)
- Zachary Bennett - Road to Avonlea (CBC/Disney Channel)
- Trevor Eyster - Salute Your Shorts (Nickelodeon)
- Sean O'Neal - Clarissa Explains It All (Nickelodeon)
- Ryan Reynolds - Fifteen (YTV/Nickelodeon)
- Josiah Trager - Big Brother Jake (Family Channel)
- Jason Zimbler - Clarissa Explains It All (Nickelodeon)

=== Best Young Actress Co-Starring in a Cable Series ===
★ Heidi Lucas - Salute Your Shorts (Nickelodeon)

- Megan Berwick - Salute Your Shorts (Nickelodeon)
- Gabrielle Carmouche - Big Brother Jake (Family Channel)
- Harmony Cramp - Road to Avonlea (CBC/Disney Channel)
- Venus DeMilo - Salute Your Shorts (Nickelodeon)
- Arseman Yohannes - Fifteen (YTV/Nickelodeon)
- Gema Zamprogna - Road to Avonlea (CBC/Disney Channel)

=== Best Young Actor Recurring in a Television Series ===
★ (tie) Aeyrk Egan - Brooklyn Bridge (CBS)
★ (tie) Bumper Robinson - Family Matters (CBS)

- Patrick Dancy - Family Matters (CBS)
- Ryan Francis - Sisters (NBC)
- Johnny Galecki - Roseanne (ABC)
- Omar Gooding - Hangin' with Mr. Cooper (ABC)
- Giovanni Ribisi - The Wonder Years (ABC)
- Cory Tyler - Beverly Hills, 90210 (FOX)

=== Best Young Actress Recurring in a Television Series ===
★ Dana Barron - Beverly Hills, 90210 (FOX)

- Danielle Harris - Roseanne (ABC)
- Cherie Johnson - Family Matters (CBS)
- Vinessa Shaw - Great Scott! (FOX)
- Kiersten Warren - Life Goes On (ABC)
- Jessica Wesson - Home Improvement (ABC)

=== Best Young Actor Guest-Starring in a Television Series ===
★ Jordan Bond - Laurie Hill (ABC)

- Harley Cross - Law & Order (NBC)
- Chris Demetral - Blossom (NBC)
- Grant Gelt - Eerie, Indiana (NBC)
- Joseph Gordon-Levitt - Quantum Leap (NBC)
- Gregor Hesse - Civil Wars (ABC)
- Jason Marsden - Baywatch (Syndication)
- Larenz Tate - The Fresh Prince of Bel-Air (NBC)
- R.J. Williams - Full House (ABC)

=== Best Young Actress Guest-Starring in a Television Series ===
★ Kimberly Cullum - Quantum Leap (NBC)

- Gabrielle Carmouche - The Cosby Show (NBC)
- Wendy J. Cooke - The Wonder Years (ABC)
- Nikki Cox - Baywatch (Syndication)
- Lisa Paige Robinson - Brooklyn Bridge (CBS)
- Marlene Katz - Sisters (NBC)
- Julianne Michelle - Who's the Boss? (ABC)
- Ariana Richards - Walter & Emily (NBC)
- Sheila Rosenthal - L.A. Law (NBC)
- Juliet Sorcey - Baywatch (Syndication)

=== Best Young Actor in a Daytime Series ===
★ Bryan Buffington - Guiding Light (CBS)

- Gregory Burke - Guiding Light (CBS)
- Brandon Farmer - Santa Barbara (NBC)
- Scott Groff - Days of Our Lives (NBC)
- Chris McKenna - One Life to Live (ABC)
- Tommy J. Michaels - All My Children (ABC)
- Paul Walker - The Young and the Restless (CBS)

=== Best Young Actress in a Daytime Series ===
★ Melissa Hayden - Guiding Light (CBS)

- Robyn Griggs - One Life to Live (ABC)
- Rachel Miner - Guiding Light (CBS)
- Lindsay Price - All My Children (ABC)
- Heather Tom - The Young and the Restless (CBS)
- Erin Torpey - One Life to Live (ABC)

=== Outstanding Actor Under 10 in a Television Series ===
★ John Aaron Bennett - I'll Fly Away (NBC)

- Josh Byrne - Step by Step (ABC)
- Clark Duke - Hearts Afire (CBS)
- Eric Lloyd - Laurie Hill (ABC)
- Matthew Lewis Siegel - Brooklyn Bridge (CBS)
- Taran Noah Smith - Home Improvement (ABC)
- Adam Wylie - Picket Fences (CBS)

=== Outstanding Actress Under 10 in a Television Series ===
★ Rae'Ven Larrymore Kelly - I'll Fly Away (NBC)

- Rachel Duncan - The Torkelsons (NBC)
- Chelsea Hertford - Major Dad (CBS)
- Ashley Johnson - Growing Pains (ABC)
- Tina Majorino - Camp Wilder (ABC)
- Raven-Symoné - The Cosby Show (NBC)

=== Outstanding Performer/Performers in a Children's Program ===
★ Adventures in Wonderland (Disney Channel) - Elisabeth Harnois

- Are You Afraid of the Dark? (Nickelodeon) - Jason Alisharan, Rachel Blanchard, Ross Hull, Raine Pare-Coull, Jodie Resther and Jacob Tierney
- Beakman's World (The Learning Channel) - Alanna Ubach
- Ghostwriter (PBS) - Todd Alexander, Blaze Berdahl, David López, Mayteana Morales, Tram-Anh Tran and Sheldon Turnipseed
- ABC Weekend Specials - McGee and Me! (ABC) - Joseph Dammann

== Best Young Voice-Over Performer ==
=== Outstanding Young Voice-Over in an Animated Series or Special ===
★ Chris Allport - Peter Pan and the Pirates (FOX)

- Zachary Bostrom - Timmy's Gift: Precious Moments Christmas (NBC)
- Phillip Glasser - Fievel's American Tails (CBS)
- John Christian Graas - It's Christmastime Again, Charlie Brown (CBS)
- Whitby Hertford - Tiny Toon Adventures (FOX)
- Joshua Wiener - Back to the Future: The Animated Series (CBS)
- R.J. Williams - TaleSpin (K-CAL)

== Best Young Host/Hosts in Television ==
=== Outstanding Host/Hosts for a Youth Magazine, News, or Game Show ===
★ Name Your Adventure (NBC) - Mario Lopez

- Wake, Rattle, and Roll (Disney Channel) - R.J. Williams
- Real News for Kids - Gary Goldstein and Jenn Harris
- Scratch (Muller Media) - Aaron Bybee, Alina Cervantes, Althea Chow, Hekima Haynie, Shawn Katapodis and Rachel Sense
- Totally Kids Sports - Will Friedle, Damon Harris, Ebenezor Quaye and Liz Vasarhelyi
- Wild and Crazy Kids (Nickelodeon) - Omar Gooding, Jessica Gaynes and Donnie Jeffcoat
- Youthquake (USA Network) - Jennifer Christina Smith

== Best Young Ensemble Performance ==
=== Outstanding Young Ensemble Cast in a Motion Picture ===
★ Hook (TriStar Pictures) - Charlie Korsmo, Amber Scott, Ryan Francis, Dante Basco, Raushan Hammond, Jasen Fisher, James Madio, Isaiah Robinson, Thomas Tulak, Alex Zuckerman, Ahmad Stone, Bogdan Georghe, Adam McNatt, René González Jr, Brian Willis, and Alex Gaona

- Ladybugs (Paramount Pictures) - Jonathan Brandis, Vinessa Shaw, Valentino, Crystal Cooke, Jennifer Frances Lee, Vanessa Monique Rossel, Johna Stewart-Bowden, and Jandi Swanson
- The Mighty Ducks (Walt Disney) - Joshua Jackson, Elden Henson, Shaun Weiss, Matt Doherty, Brandon Quintin Adams, J.D. Daniels, Aaron Schwartz, Garette Ratliff Henson, Marguerite Moreau, Jane Plank, Jussie Smollett, Vincent Larusso, and Danny Tamberelli
- Newsies (Walt Disney) - Christian Bale, David Moscow, Luke Edwards, Max Casella, Marty Belafsky, Arvie Lowe, Jr., Aaron Lohr, Trey Parker, Gabriel Damon, Shon Greenblatt, and Ele Keats
- 3 Ninjas (Touchstone Pictures) - Michael Treanor, Max Elliott Slade, and Chad Power

=== Outstanding Young Ensemble Cast in a Youth Series or Variety Show ===
★ Roundhouse (Nickelodeon) - Alfred J. Carr Jr., John Crane, Mark David, Shawn Daywalt, Ivan Dudynsky, Micki Duran, Seymour Willis Green, Crystal Lewis, Dominic Lucero, Natalie Nucci, Julene Renee, and David Sidoni

- California Dreams (NBC) - Michael Cade, Brent Gore, William James Jones, Heidi Lenhart, and Kelly Packard
- Kids Incorporated (Disney Channel) - Eric Balfour, Nicole Brown, Jared Delgin, Kenny Ford, Jennifer Love Hewitt, Anastasia Horne, and Haylie Johnson
- The All New Mickey Mouse Club (Disney Channel) - Josh Ackerman, Lindsey Alley, Rhona Bennett, Nita Booth, Mylin Brooks, Jason Blain Carson, JC Chasez, Tasha Danner, Dale Godboldo, Tony Lucca, Ricky Luna, Jennifer McGill, Terra McNair, Illana Miller, Jason Minor, Matt Morris, Kevin Osgood, Keri Russell, and Marc Worden
- The Wonder Years (ABC) - Fred Savage, Josh Saviano, Danica McKellar, Jason Hervey, Giovanni Ribisi

=== Best Ensemble Performance in a TV Movie or Special ===
★ Saved by the Bell: Hawaiian Style (NBC) - Elizabeth Berkley, Dustin Diamond, Lark Voorhies, Mario Lopez, Tiffani Thiessen, and Mark-Paul Gosselaar

== Best Young Performer in Theatre ==
=== Outstanding Actor in a Theatre Performance ===
★ Karl Maschek - David's Mother (Pasadena Playhouse)

- Scott Cheek - Sweeney Todd: The Demon Barber of Fleet Street (OSCHA)
- Alex Dezen - Lost in Yonkers (Center Theatre Group/Ahmanson at the Doolittle)
- Oscar Garcia - Bless Me, Ultima (Plaza De La Rosa)
- Brandon Rane - Bye Bye Birdie (Conejo Players Theater)

=== Outstanding Actress in a Theatre Performance ===
★ Lindsay Ridgeway - Annie Warbucks (Pantages Theatre)

- LaShanda Hunt - Once on This Island (Wilshire Theatre)
- Melody Koy - The Secret Garden (Shubert Theatre)
- Valerie Levitt - Flowers of Memory (Burbage Theatre Ensemble)
- Adrienne Steiffel - The Early Show (The Gardenia)

== Best Family Entertainment ==
=== Outstanding Family Television Special ===
★ Please, God, I'm Only Seventeen (CBS)

- Against Her Will: An Incident in Baltimore (CBS)
- Disney's Young Musicians Symphony Orchestra (Disney Channel)
- Jonathan: The Boy Nobody Wanted (NBC)
- Mark Twain and Me (Disney Channel)

=== Best Family Motion Picture ===
★ Hook (TriStar Pictures)

- Beethoven (Universal Pictures)
- Honey, I Blew Up the Kid (Walt Disney)
- My Girl (Columbia Pictures)
- Radio Flyer (Columbia Pictures)

=== Best Family Television Series ===
★ Saved by the Bell (NBC)

- Clarissa Explains It All (Nickelodeon)
- Blossom (American TV series) (NBC)
- Dinosaurs (ABC)
- Fifteen (TV series) (Nickelodeon)
- Full House (NBC)
- Home Improvement (ABC)
- I'll Fly Away (TV series) (NBC)
- Step by Step (TV series) (ABC)
- Welcome Freshmen (Nickelodeon)
- The Wonder Years (ABC)

=== Best Family TV Movie/Pilot/Mini-Series: Network ===
★ Saved by the Bell: Hawaiian Style (NBC)

- Buffy the Vampire Slayer
- Clowning Around
- Desperate Choices: To Save My Child
- The Elf Who Saved Christmas (USA Network)

== Youth In Film's Special Awards ==
=== Jackie Coogan Award for Outstanding Contribution to Youth ===
★ Sid & Marty Krofft

=== Michael Landon Award for Best Television Series ===
★ Home Improvement - Matt Williams, Carmen Finestra, David McFadzean

=== Outstanding Family Entertainment of the Year ===
★ Walt Disney Pictures - Aladdin & Beauty and the Beast

=== Ensemble Award ===
★ Saved by the Bell (NBC) - Elizabeth Berkley, Dustin Diamond, Lark Voorhies, Mario Lopez, Tiffani Thiessen, and Mark-Paul Gosselaar

=== Favorite Young Ensemble Cast in a Television Series ===
★ Beverly Hills, 90210

=== Outstanding Children's Educational Home Videos ===
★ Lisa Marie Nelson - Karate for Kids
★ Ann Eldridge, Mark Warshaw - Read Now

=== Outstanding Young Performers Starring in a Mini-Series ===
★ Alex Burrall & Jason Weaver - The Jacksons: An American Dream

=== Most Promising Young Newcomers ===
★ Adam Hann-Byrd - Little Man Tate
★ Anna Chlumsky - My Girl

=== Most Promising Young Up and Coming Music Artists ===
★ Immature

=== Favorite New Music Artists ===
★ TLC
