= List of Clarissa Explains It All episodes =

This is a list of episodes for the Nickelodeon children's sitcom Clarissa Explains It All, which aired from 1991 to 1994. The series lasted five seasons, each producing thirteen episodes. Many of the episodes were shown in a different order than the order in which they were produced. Both the production numbers and the airing numbers are listed. A total of 65 episodes were produced. As of July 2018, only the first season is available on DVD.

== Series overview ==
Season	Episodes	Originally released	
Season	Episodes	First released	Last released
1	13	March 23, 1991	June 15, 1991
2	13	February 14, 1992	September 12, 1992
3	13	September 19, 1992	February 27, 1993
4	13	March 13, 1993	October 16, 1993
5	13	October 23, 1993	October 1, 1994

== Episodes ==
=== Season 1 (1991) ===
The original pilot was taped in September 1990; episodes 1–13 were taped from February to June 1991.

No. overall	No. in season	Title	Directed by	Written by	Original release date	Prod. code
1	1	"Clarissa's Revenge"	Kenneth Frankel	Mitchell Kriegman	March 23, 1991	101
After Clarissa gets her first training bra, she tries to exact revenge on her brother for showing her bra at school, using a plan involving putting him into a straitjacket and having her friend Sam attach large helium balloons to him to carry him into the sky. Meanwhile, Sam wants to get out of the school football team. Her plan fails when Sam is lifted in the sky while holding the balloons, and crashes into a nearby tree. They burst and he falls to the ground, injuring his arm – meaning that he cannot play football. Note: An early, unaired version of this pilot was taped in September 1990. It was directed by Henry Irving, and was identical to the broadcast version, but with everyone, except for Clarissa and Ferguson, played by different actors. Janet was played by Nancy Youngblut, Marshall was played by Terry Layman, and Sam was played by Daren E. Higgins.
2	2	"No TV"	Maureen Thorp	Mitchell Kriegman	March 30, 1991	103
Janet decides the household watches too much television and begins an anti-television rule. Family members try to gain access to television through various schemes.
3	3	"Clarissa News Network"	Maureen Thorp	Ellis Weiner & Alexa Junge	April 6, 1991	105
Clarissa wants to become a television journalist. Meanwhile, Janet faces a dance friend who steals one of her best moves, and Ferguson cons Marshall into buying a music cassette that he thinks will teach him Swahili.
4	4	"Haunted House"	Maureen Thorp	Tim Burns	April 13, 1991	106
When Aunt Mafalda visits from Canada, Clarissa tries to scare her away by saying the house is haunted. It does not work, and Clarissa sets up a seance to contact Mafalda's dead husband.
5	5	"New Addition"	John Ferraro	Becky Hartman	April 20, 1991	108
Clarissa suspects that her parents are having another child when they plan to add a room to the house.
6	6	"School Picture"	Kenneth Frankel	Alexa Junge	April 27, 1991	102
Clarissa hates having to wear uncool clothes on picture day and starts campaigning to wear what she wants. Meanwhile, Janet and Marshall argue over Janet's high school boyfriend.
7	7	"Urge to Drive"	Maureen Thorp	Patty Marx	May 4, 1991	104
Clarissa tries to buy a car with money from Christmas cards. However, she hasn't earned enough to pay for the cards and she finds it difficult to sell them in July.
8	8	"The Bully"	Chuck Vinson	Alexa Junge & Mitchell Kriegman	May 11, 1991	107
Many of Clarissa and Ferguson's things have disappeared, and Clarissa finds out the school bully, Clifford, is to blame.
9	9	"Brain Drain"	Maureen Thorp	Neena Beber	May 18, 1991	109
Ferguson convinces himself he is a genius after an IQ test. Clarissa tries to prove him wrong by joining him on the game show Brain Drain.
10	10	"Clarissa Makes a Cake"	Maureen Thorp	Alexa Junge & Mitchell Kriegman	May 25, 1991	110
Clarissa tries to help celebrate her parents' wedding anniversary by making a cake, but Janet and Marshall stop talking to each other over what to do on the night.
11	11	"Sick Days"	Chuck Vinson	Patty Marx & Alexa Junge & Neena Beber	June 1, 1991	113
Clarissa fakes sickness in trying to get out of her part in the school pageant. But, when the play turns out to be a success, Clarissa truly becomes ill.
12	12	"Cool Dad"	Chuck Vinson	Glenn Eichler & Peter Gaffney	June 8, 1991	112
Clarissa's father tries to get hip for her school's career night.
13	13	"Parents Who Say No"	Chuck Vinson	Mitchell Kriegman	June 15, 1991	111
Clarissa applies for a job at the Baxter Beach Carnival, even though her parents said no.

=== Season 2 (1992) ===
Episodes 14-30 were taped from January to June 1992.

No. overall	No. in season	Title	Directed by	Written by	Original release date	Prod. code
14	1	"Crush"	Chuck Vinson	Neena Beber & Mitchell Kriegman	February 14, 1992	114
Clarissa has a crush on a television weatherman and begins predicting weather into all aspects of her family's life. Note: Originally aired not only to kick off the second season, but to also celebrate Valentine's Day, along with Valentine's Day-themed episodes of Welcome Freshmen, Hey Dude, and The Adventures of Pete and Pete. Also, in this episode, the Darling Household has a new look.
15	2	"She Drives Me Crazy"	Chuck Vinson	Mollie Fermaglich	February 23, 1992	115
To win a new car, Clarissa enters her and Ferguson in a contest for siblings with great relationships.
16	3	"Sam.....Darling"	Chuck Vinson	Douglas Petrie	March 1, 1992	116
Clarissa is jealous of Sam spending all his time with her parents.
17	4	"President Ferguson"	Chuck Vinson	Michael Borkow & Paul Lieberstein	March 8, 1992	117
Clarissa wants to stop her brother's campaign for class president from taking all her family's time.
18	5	"ME 101"	Chuck Vinson	Neena Beber	June 7, 1992	120
Janet fails a quiz on how well she knows her daughter, and tries to get to know her daughter better.
19	6	"Misguidance Counselor"	Chuck Vinson	Neena Beber	June 14, 1992	123
Clarissa's guidance counselor Mrs. Cheesebrow (Nancy Youngblut) tries to enlist her in "normal" activities.
20	7	"Sam in Love"	Carl Lauten	Sybil Adelman & Martin Sage	June 28, 1992	124
Clarissa feels left out when Sam cancels plans with her to spend time with a new girlfriend, Elise Quackenbush (Cassidy Rae).
21	8	"A New Look"	Carl Lauten	Story by : Mitchell Kriegman & Julia Poll; Teleplay by : Julia Poll	July 12, 1992	125
Marshall is approached by a talent scout to appear in an advertising campaign. Meanwhile, Clarissa wants to spend time with Clifford Spleenhurfer.
22	9	"Total TV"	Chuck Vinson	Alison Taylor	August 15, 1992	126
Clarissa finds it difficult to watch television continuously for 24 hours for a science project. Note: This episode aired at 8:00 p.m. on the same night the network launched their SNICK block, after previously airing on Sundays in the daytime and evening. The show would remain as a part of SNICK for the rest of the run, until the finale. Also, new intro and ending sequences debut. They, too, would be used until the end of the run, and the older sequences would be replaced with the new sequences in all of the episodes aired before August 1992.
23	10	"The Understudy"	Richard Steir	Mollie Fermaglich	August 22, 1992	121
Clarissa is chosen as an understudy in the school play, but when the lead comes down with strep throat, Clarissa must learn her lines quickly.
24	11	"Can't Buy Love"	Chuck Vinson	Douglas Petrie	August 29, 1992	122
Clarissa has a secret admirer. Meanwhile, Ferguson has become friends with an incredibly rich student. Clarissa discovers that Ferguson's new friend is using him for his own reasons.
25	12	"The Great Debate"	Chuck Vinson	Sherri Ziff	September 5, 1992	119
Clarissa is worried about her parents marriage during a debate between them.
26	13	"The Return of Mafalda"	Chuck Vinson	Sybil Adelman & Martin Sage	September 12, 1992	118
Aunt Mafalda comes to babysit, but Clarissa is having a sleepover and has to get rid of her.

=== Season 3 (1992–1993) ===
Episodes 31-54 were taped from September 1992 to June 1993.

No. overall	No. in season	Title	Directed by	Written by	Original release date	Prod. code
27	1	"Sam's Swan Song"	Liz Plonka	Story by : Jennifer Morris; Teleplay by : Alison Taylor	September 19, 1992	130
Sam's mother comes home from the Roller Derby with plans to change Sam's life.
28	2	"Janet's Boyfriend"	Carl Lauten	Mollie Fermaglich	September 26, 1992	127
Janet's old high school boyfriend Joey comes to town and visits the Darlings for dinner.
29	3	"Poetic Justice"	Liz Plonka	Neena Beber	October 10, 1992	129
Clarissa represents her school at a poetry banquet after her computer writes a strange but well-loved poem.
30	4	"The Darling Wars"	Carl Lauten	Douglas Petrie	October 24, 1992	128
Clarissa and Ferguson try to scare each other when left home alone, fight a lot, & hear a person (they think it's a burglar) come in the kitchen which is actually their dad.
31	5	"Punch the Clocks"	Liz Plonka	Douglas Petrie	November 21, 1992	131
Clarissa seeks employment and ends up overworked with four jobs. Meanwhile, Marshall and Clifford go head-to-head in a battle of the refrigerator. Note: As of this taping, the living room now has its more familiar setup. However, the walls were painted in purple, which were changed to beige in the next taping. Also introduced in this episode were new commercial bumpers, which would be used until the finale.
32	6	"The Silent Treatment"	Liz Plonka	Alan Goodman	November 28, 1992	132
Ferguson tries to get back at Clarissa after an argument by giving her the silent treatment. Meanwhile, Janet serves on a jury and fears the house is bugged.
33	7	"Involunteering"	Liz Plonka	Alan Goodman	December 12, 1992	133
There’s a Family Volunteer Day at Janet's children’s museum, and she encourages the family to take part in the festivities. But, when misfortune strikes the museum, the day’s events are moved to the Darling household. The kids get out of control until Clarissa manages to save the day, but not before Ferguson is left bound and gagged in his room.
34	8	"Take My Advice...Please"	Liz Plonka	Neena Beber	December 19, 1992	134
Clarissa gives Ferguson bad advice to ruin his new romance with Fiona (Joanna Garcia). But, when her advice is proven effective, Ferguson gains many girlfriends.
35	9	"Marshall's Mid-Life Crisis"	Liz Plonka	Mollie Fermaglich	December 26, 1992	135
Marshall's birthday arrives, and he wants to take the entire family to Mango Island. A couple interested in buying their house stops his plan.
36	10	"Football Fever"	Liz Plonka	Mark Cerulli	January 23, 1993	136
Ferguson tries to make the varsity football team after his father makes a bet with a neighbor. Meanwhile, Clarissa takes up photography.
37	11	"Life of Crime"	Chuck Vinson	Suzanne Collins	January 30, 1993	137
Clarissa accidentally acquires a piece of adult underwear when hassled to leave the store at closing time.
38	12	"Marshall's Parents Visit"	Chuck Vinson	Mollie Fermaglich	February 13, 1993	138
Marshall's parents pay a surprise visit, and it upsets Clarissa that their carefree existence has morphed into an energetic lifestyle. Meanwhile, Sam acquires Pearl Jam tickets, prompting Clarissa to seek away out of her previous engagement, DJing her grandparents' anniversary party.
39	13	"Blind Date"	Chuck Vinson	Neena Beber	February 27, 1993	139
Sam sets himself and Clarissa on a double blind date, and Clarissa obsesses over what could happen on the date.

=== Season 4 (1993) ===
No. overall	No. in season	Title	Directed by	Written by	Original release date	Prod. code
40	1	"The Flu"	Chuck Vinson	Douglas Petrie	March 13, 1993	140
When Janet and Marshall become sick with the flu, Clarissa and Ferguson must take care of household chores.
41	2	"ESP R Us"	Chuck Vinson	Karen Salmansohn	March 27, 1993	141
Clarissa doesn't believe that Olivia has psychic powers, so Olivia takes a test offered through the mail, and the two become wrapped up in a money-making scam. Meanwhile, Ferguson sells cosmetics to a gullible Marshall and a down-in-the-dumps Janet.
42	3	"Commitment"	Liz Plonka	Suzanne Collins	April 17, 1993	142
Clarissa begins to have commitment fears with her boyfriend Clifford.
43	4	"Road Trip"	Liz Plonka	Alan Goodman	May 8, 1993	143
The family decides to take a road trip to the Grand Canyon other than their usual Lake Winnemucca. But, when tension arises from the overwhelming number of decisions, the Darlings learn a lesson about tradition.
44	5	"The Bicycle Thief"	Liz Plonka	Julia Poll	May 22, 1993	144
Clarissa's bike, her only method of transportation, is stolen after leaving it in the front yard.
45	6	"Boy Thoughts"	Carl Lauten	Douglas Petrie	June 19, 1993	145
Clifford doesn't have time for Clarissa after he stars in Ferguson's hit Public-access television show.
46	7	"Hero Worship"	Carl Lauten	Mollie Fermaglich	June 26, 1993	146
Eve, the new girl at school, annoys Clarissa when she begins copying her style, but then is flattered.
47	8	"The Zone"	Chuck Vinson	Neena Beber	July 10, 1993	148
Clarissa is chosen for a flute solo at the school music recital.
48	9	"A Little Romance"	Carl Lauten	Suzanne Collins	August 14, 1993	147
Sam realizes that Clarissa is the perfect girl for him after too many bad dates. Meanwhile, in a spoof of Rear Window, Marshall and Ferguson suspect their neighbor Ned Soaperstein has murdered his wife Edna.
49	10	"Tale of Two Moms"	Chuck Vinson	Alan Goodman	August 28, 1993	149
Sam's mom comes back to town, and Clarissa invites her to stay at the Darling household.
50	11	"Don't I Know You?"	Chuck Vinson	Alexa Junge	September 11, 1993	150
Clarissa turns to an old journal for some helpful hints for the all school talent show, where she must complete with Cindy Sparkle.
51	12	"Babysitting"	Liz Plonka	Douglas Petrie	September 25, 1993	151
Clarissa is guilted into babysitting troublemaker Elsie Soaperstein (Michelle Trachtenberg) on her parents' anniversary.
52	13	"Educating Janet"	Liz Plonka	Mollie Fermaglich	October 16, 1993	152
Clarissa and Ferguson have issues with their mother when she begins teaching at their high school.

=== Season 5 (1993–1994) ===
Episodes 55-65 were taped from September to December 1993.

No. overall	No. in season	Title	Directed by	Written by	Original release date	Prod. code
53	1	"The Cycle"	Chuck Vinson	Alan Goodman	October 23, 1993	153
Clarissa stores Olivia's brother's motorcycle in the garage with plans to buy it.
54	2	"A New Mom"	Chuck Vinson	Neena Beber	November 13, 1993	154
Clarissa's history assignment is to take something old, tired, and worn out, and reinvent it. Clarissa's something: her mother.
55	3	"Editor-in-Chief"	Liz Plonka	Neena Beber	November 20, 1993	155
Clarissa must learn responsibility when she becomes editor in chief of her school newspaper.
56	4	"Piper Comes to Visit"	Liz Plonka	Mollie Fermaglich	December 4, 1993	156
Piper, the unfriendly daughter of Janet's school friend, comes to stay. This means Clarissa has work ahead of her.
57	5	"Alter Ego"	Liz Plonka	Suzanne Collins	December 18, 1993	157
Clarissa goes to a party dressed up as a wild character and falls for a guy (James Van Der Beek). But is he interested in Clarissa or her cool alter ego, Jade? Note: This episode originally aired at the very end of a marathon of older ones.
58	6	"Sam's Dad"	Liz Plonka	Douglas Petrie	January 8, 1994	158
Clarissa and Sam sign up for their school's intern program to become acquainted with their world.
59	7	"The Firm"	Liz Plonka	Alan Goodman	January 15, 1994	159
Marshall joins an architectural firm with some great offers from the firm, but the family doesn't all feel the same.
60	8	"Janet and Clarissa, Inc."	Liz Plonka	Suzanne Collins	January 29, 1994	160
Clarissa and Janet team up to sell Bouncy Balls health treats, but their attempts don't succeed.
61	9	"Ferguson Explains It All"	Liz Plonka	Mitchell Kriegman	February 12, 1994	161
Ferguson decides to test out his new mind control glasses on his family, but Clarissa fights back.
62	10	"Dear Clarissa"	Liz Plonka	Peter Mattei	February 26, 1994	162
After she is given her own advice column in the school newspaper, Clarissa discovers giving advice isn't as easy as she thought.
63	11	"UFO"	Liz Plonka	Neena Beber	July 16, 1994	163
Clarissa interviews a woman who spotted a UFO, and discovers that science can be really weird.
64	12	"Clarissa Gets Arrested"	Liz Plonka	Doug Petrie	July 23, 1994	164
Clarissa and Sam protest against animals testing at Woolcott Industries, but they get arrested.
65	13	"The Last Episode"	Liz Plonka	Mitchell Kriegman	October 1, 1994	165
Clarissa finishes her last article for the newspaper, dedicated to the future. This raises the question: Where will everyone be in 20 years?
