= Clarissa Explains It All =

American television sitcom (1991–1994)

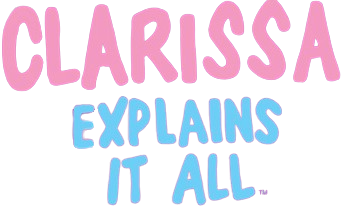
- Created by: Mitchell Kriegman
- Starring: Melissa Joan Hart; Joe O'Connor; Elizabeth Hess; Jason Zimbler; Sean O'Neal
- Narrated by: Melissa Joan Hart
- Theme music composer: Rachel Sweet; Anthony Battaglia; Willa Bassen
- Opening theme: "Clarissa Explains It All", performed by Rachel Sweet
- Ending theme: "Clarissa Explains It All"
- Country of origin: United States
- Original language: English
- No. of seasons: 5 (see note)
- No. of episodes: 65 (list of episodes)

Production
- Executive producers: Mitchell Kriegman; Marjorie Cohn; Brown Johnson; Geoffrey Darby; Andy Bamberger
- Producer: Mitchell Kriegman
- Production locations: Universal Studios Florida; Orlando, Florida
- Camera setup: Multi-camera
- Running time: 20–26 minutes
- Production company: Thunder Pictures

Original release
- Network: Nickelodeon
- Release: March 23, 1991 – October 1, 1994

Clarissa Explains It All is an American teen sitcom created by Mitchell Kriegman for Nickelodeon. In the series, Clarissa Darling (Melissa Joan Hart) is a teenager who addresses the audience directly to explain the things that are happening in her life, dealing with typical adolescent concerns such as school, boys, pimples, wearing her first training bra, and an annoying younger brother.

A total of 65 episodes were produced and aired from March 23, 1991, to October 1, 1994, with repeats airing until August 19, 2001. From August 1992 onwards, the series headlined the popular SNICK (Saturday Night Nickelodeon) lineup. Reruns of the show have appeared intermittently on TeenNick's channel block The '90s Are All That, eventually NickRewind, from 2011 to 2020.

A pilot for a spin-off series was filmed titled "Clarissa Now". It featured Clarissa as an intern at a newspaper in New York City. The pilot was not picked up, and aired once as a special on Nickelodeon.

In 2015, Kriegman released a novel, Things I Can't Explain, which serves as a sequel to the series. In the novel, Clarissa is now in her late 20s and trying to navigate life as an adult. In March 2018, it was reported that a sequel to the series was in development at Nickelodeon, with Clarissa now as a mother. In March 2022, Hart revealed the reboot was not moving forward at Nickelodeon.

== Premise ==
The main characters in the show are Clarissa Darling, her family (consisting of her father Marshall, her mother Janet, and her younger brother Ferguson) and her best friend Sam, all living in a small, unnamed suburban town in Ohio. Clarissa had a pet baby alligator, Elvis, which she kept in a kiddie-sandbox who appeared sporadically in early episodes.

Clarissa was credited with becoming the first Nickelodeon series to feature a female lead, which led the network to create other shows such as The Secret World of Alex Mack, The Amanda Show and The Mystery Files of Shelby Woo. Its popularity among both boys and girls also helped to debunk a myth that a children's series with a female lead would not appeal to boys.

Clarissa dealt with normal adolescent issues such as first crushes, getting a driver's license and preparing for college and working. These topics were dealt with far less dramatically than they were on other similar shows at the time (such as Full House and Blossom). For instance, in one episode Clarissa accidentally shoplifts a piece of lingerie but is neither caught by store security nor punished by her parents; she spends most of the episode trying to figure out how to remedy the situation on her own. One running gag involved her friend Sam often entering the scene by a ladder (accompanied by a characteristic chord of guitar music) through her bedroom window. A repeating theme during the series was the sibling rivalry between Clarissa and Ferguson, showing their repeated attempts to harm or even (as in the series premiere) to "kill" each other.

Unique to the show was Clarissa's tendency to tackle the episode's central theme through the creation of a fictional video game. The show also integrated some of Hart's real-life likes, such as the band They Might Be Giants.

== Episodes ==
The decision to structure the episodes into five seasons of thirteen episodes each was made after the show ended its original broadcast run. During the original run of the series, the seasons were not well defined.

Season	Episodes	Originally released	
Season	Episodes	First released	Last released
1	13	March 23, 1991	June 15, 1991
2	13	February 14, 1992	September 12, 1992
3	13	September 19, 1992	February 27, 1993
4	13	March 13, 1993	October 16, 1993
5	13	October 23, 1993	October 1, 1994

== Characters ==
=== Main ===
- Clarissa Marie Darling (Melissa Joan Hart) – A smart, witty, sarcastic and realistic teenage girl. Despite her rationalism, she often tends to exaggerate any problem she is facing. She was 14 years old when the series began and was a freshman at Thomas Tupper Junior High School. Her interests include computer game programming, photography, journalism and rock music. Though she is usually mild-mannered, she can be just as selfish and calculating as her younger brother Ferguson. Clarissa is best known for her unique fashion sense, typically involving very colorful, mismatched clothing. During Season 1, Clarissa had an alligator named Elvis, but in the first episode of Season 2, Clarissa explained that her parents sent Elvis back to Florida when he grew too big. In Mitchell Kriegman's novel, Things I Can't Explain, Clarissa further elaborated that he "disappeared under mysterious circumstances" and "it took years to get mom to confess that she gave away the reptilian Elvis without telling me after Ferguson tried to shove a pocket watch down its throat thinking it would win him the role of Captain Hook in the school play." In reality David Ellis, who worked as art director in-house on the series, suggested that the show may have been under pressure from the ASPCA to remove the alligator from later episodes and that it would also represent the idea that Clarissa was also growing older.
- Marshall Darling (Joe O'Connor) – Clarissa and Ferguson's father. He is an architect who designs unusually shaped buildings, mostly retail and tourist attractions (such as the "Fryfel Tower"). Clarissa sometimes comes to him for advice, but he is less reliable in this role than Janet. He often calls Clarissa "sport", seldom addressing her by name. He and Janet are former flower children from the 1960s. In comparison to adult co-star Elizabeth Hess, O'Connor initially had difficulty becoming part of the ensemble and accepting the show was primarily centered around Clarissa and that the rest of the family were more supporting characters. As Kriegman later explained "after a while you kinda have to take a backseat and understand that it's CLARISSA Explains It All, not The Darling Family." In the unaired Pilot, he was played by Terry Layman.
- Janet Darling (Elizabeth Hess) – Clarissa and Ferguson's mother. She is the only family member Clarissa sees as a voice of reason and thus she seeks advice from her occasionally. She is a teacher who works at a children's museum. She is also an environmentalist and an organic food enthusiast who often cooks bizarre meals using lima beans or tofu. Despite an extensive background in theatre and performing arts, Hess later recalled that Kriegman advised her that she did not need to use her "very big range as an actress" and that he cast her because he thought she was a "sexy mom". Despite this, Kriegman commented years later that Hess "was always fun" on the set. In the unaired Pilot, she was played by Nancy Youngblut.
- Ferguson W. Darling (Jason Zimbler) – Clarissa's younger brother, a mischievous youngster. He and Clarissa continually antagonize each other. She refers to him with several epithets such as "Ferg-face", "Fergwad", "Ferghead", "Ferglips", "Fergbrains", "Fergbreath." He loves money and comes up with get-rich-quick schemes. He is also a Young Republican who idolizes Dan Quayle and Ronald Reagan. He attends school with her and is approximately one or two years younger. In some episodes Clarissa and Ferguson occasionally collaborate, usually to the advantage of both. However, he is somewhat less popular at school than Clarissa. Ferguson's mom gave him her maiden name for a first name. Despite achieving fame relatively early in his career, unlike co-star Hart, Zimbler decided to not pursue an acting career and attended college instead. As Zimbler later recalled, "somewhere on the show, I think I grew up."
- Samuel "Sam" Anders (Sean O'Neal) – Clarissa's best friend and confidant. Generally more optimistic and upbeat than she is, he often asks "What's the worst that can happen?" He is perhaps best known for entering her second-story bedroom with a ladder after a distinctive guitar chord plays followed by Clarissa's "Hi, Sam" greeting. Creator Mitchell Kriegman explained that Sam entering the house through Clarissa's bedroom window was "a way to get him into her room [...] and start interacting faster" as well as keeping their relationship non-sexual. He is smart and polite and enjoys skateboarding. His parents are divorced (mentioned in the pilot) and it is mentioned early on that his mother left his father to join a Roller derby. Sam's father works as a sports journalist and later gives Clarissa the opportunity to complete some work experience with him. In the unaired Pilot, he was played by Darren E. Higgins.

=== Recurring ===
- Aunt Mafalda (Heather MacRae) – Clarissa and Ferguson's aunt from Canada whom Clarissa dislikes and tries to get rid of in two episodes in the first two seasons.
- Clifford Spleenhurfer (David Eck) – Originally a bully who harassed Ferguson in Season 1, he developed a crush on Clarissa when she stood up to him. She later misses his affections in Season 2, and they begin a relationship which ends in Season 4. He appeared in a total of five episodes, the most of any recurring character. His defining characteristic was a big appetite, much to Marshall's annoyance.
- Dr. Festerspoon (Bob Noble) – The family doctor, who appears in two episodes in seasons 1 and 4.
- Hillary O'Keefe (Sara Burkhardt) – Clarissa's friend from Thomas Tupper High, who appears in four episodes in seasons 2 and 3.
- Deborah "Debbie" Anders (Susan Greenhill) – Sam's estranged mother who is often on the road with a traveling women's Roller derby team. She appears in a third-season episode where she tries to take custody of Sam and make him move to Seattle and again in the fourth season when she stays with the Darlings and becomes a burden.
- Olivia DuPris (Nicole Leach) – Another one of Clarissa's friends from high school, who appears in seasons 4 and 5.
- The Soapersteins – The Darlings' mostly unseen next-door neighbors, referred to continually throughout the series. The mother and daughter appear once in season 4, and the family's dog appears in season 5.

=== Notable guest appearances ===
These are other guest appearances, in single episodes by notable actors known for their other work.

- Nancy Youngblut as Mrs. Cheesebrow, a school guidance counselor who tries to get Clarissa interested in "normal" activities in season 2.
- Cassidy Rae as Elise Quackenbush, Sam's girlfriend in season 2.
- Paul Kreppel as Joey Russo, Janet's ex-high school sweetheart in season 3.
- JoAnna Garcia as Fiona, Ferguson's love interest in season 3.
- Michelle Trachtenberg as Elsie Soaperstein, Clarissa and Ferguson's neighbor and the Soaperstein's spoiled daughter whom Clarissa must babysit in season 4. She also had a crush on Ferguson and often refers to him as "Fergie".
- Jonathan Mangum as Clarissa's imagined blind date in season 3 (seen only in a dream sequence); the same actor is credited in the role of a waiter and in the role of a pizza delivery man in a fifth-season episode.
- Wayne Brady as the second pizza delivery man that crossed Clarissa's doorstep in a fifth-season episode.
- Sheeri Rappaport as Piper Henderson, Clarissa's globe-traveling friend who comes to visit in season 5.
- James Van Der Beek as Paulie, a boy whom Clarissa attracts as her punk alter-ego Jade in season 5.
- Shannon Woodward as Missy, a girl whose lost kitten Ferguson finds in season 5.

== Production ==
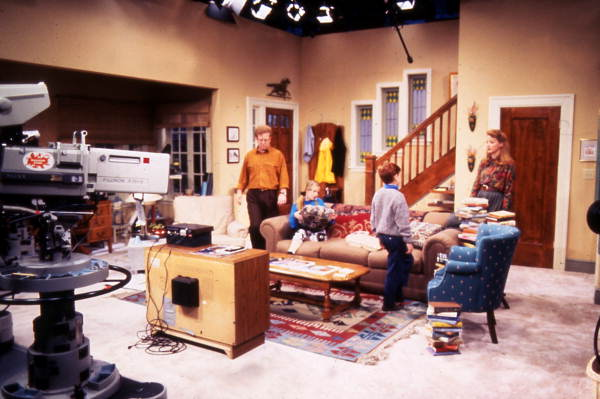
Clarissa Explains It All taping at Nickelodeon Studios, 1991

Show creator Mitchell Kriegman, who had a background as a short-story writer and video artist, had previously worked on shows such as Saturday Night Live and Sesame Street. He sought to create an offbeat, trendsetting character living a typical teenager's life, but who did not fit the stereotypical representations of teenage girls on television at the time. Kriegman said, "I thought that if other people ... knew what was going on in a 13-year-old girl's mind, it would be cool. They are really experimenting at that age."

Clarissa Explains It All was the second sitcom to premiere on Nickelodeon in 1991, after Hey Dude ended its run. It was one of seven new programs (three animated and four live-action) to premiere on Nickelodeon that year, as the network began producing more original programming. It outlived the other live-action series introduced that year, Welcome Freshmen, Salute Your Shorts, and Fifteen, although Fifteen (an imported Canadian series) also lasted 65 episodes. Production on the pilot episode took place in September 1990, with Season 1 production beginning in February 1991 and series production wrapping in December 1993.

The show's theme song was sung by Rachel Sweet. It consisted entirely of a melody sung on the syllable "Na," punctuated with the occasional "Way cool!" or "All right! All right!" and underscored by rhythmic instrumentation, ending with a resounding "Just do it!"

A pilot for a follow-up series, Clarissa, was shot for CBS in 1995, but was not picked up by the network. The pilot was shown on two occasions on Nickelodeon after the original series had ended production. The new series would have involved Clarissa's internship at a New York City newspaper. Comedian Robert Klein costarred in the pilot as the newspaper's editor. Supporting roles were played by Marian Seldes and Lisa Gay Hamilton. In 2002, Hart said that she would not be interested in a cast reunion project: "No. Shirley Temple taught me one thing. And that was once you finish a career, you move on." In her next television series, Sabrina, the Teenage Witch, her character actually did become a journalist.

== Broadcast ==
After debuting on Saturday, March 23, 1991, at 6 p.m, and repeating twice the next day, Clarissa Explains It All moved to Sundays at 12:30 p.m. and 6:30 p.m. starting on April 7, 1991. The following year the show moved to anchor the SNICK block of Saturday-night Nickelodeon programming, airing at 8 p.m. Saturdays starting on August 15, 1992. New airings continued to be shown at that time (with repeat airings at noon on Sundays) until the end of the series run.

=== Reruns ===
The series aired in reruns on Nickelodeon from 1994 to 1999, a second time in 2001 as part of the TEENick block, and a third time in 2004 as part of U-Pick Live's Old School Pick. It also aired on The N from 2002 to 2003.

The series returned in reruns to TeenNick on July 25, 2011, as part of its The '90s Are All That block. It aired at 10 p.m. Pacific / 1 a.m. Eastern, with the first episode having been 'The Understudy' from Season 2. TeenNick replaced the show with Rocko's Modern Life on September 5, 2011. The series returned to The '90s Are All That from September 26, 2011, to October 6, 2011, when the show was replaced with Hey Dude. It then returned to TeenNick on December 31, 2011, with the airing of the series finale at a special timeslot, 11:00 p.m., to celebrate the end of 2011, and aired on the block again at 1:00am on January 1, 2012, with the airing of the series premiere to celebrate the beginning of 2012. The show aired on The '90s Are All That in a marathon on the night of December 30, 2012, and then a marathon every night from January 21, 2013, to January 27, 2013. On October 6, 2015, the show returned to the block, now known as The Splat. In 2019, the show is being rerun during the overnight hours on the Nick Pluto TV channel. The show aired in reruns on the NickRewind block from March 23, 2020, to April 19, 2020.

== Home video releases ==
From 1994 to 95, a number of VHS tapes were released through Sony Wonder each containing 2 or 3 episodes alongside other Nickelodeon shows, usually centered around a certain theme such as school, dating, or sibling rivalry. The final VHS release released on March 21, 1995 was the final time that Hart and Zimbler portrayed their respective characters, Clarissa and Ferguson, on screen together.

In May 2005, the show's first season was released on DVD as part of the Nickelodeon Rewind Collection by Viacom's corporate subsidiary, Paramount Pictures. The second season was scheduled to be released a few months later, but it was pulled from Paramount Pictures' release schedule. To this date, there are no plans to release the series further on DVD.

Season one is also available on iTunes, Xbox Live, and the PlayStation Store. Various episodes from the five seasons of the series are also available on Paramount+.

== Awards ==
In 1994, the series was nominated for an Emmy Award for Outstanding Children's Program. In addition, Hart, O'Neal, and Zimbler also received multiple Young Artist Award nominations. Hart won three competitive Young Artist Awards during the show's original run, as well as receiving the association's honorary Former Child Star Award in 2013 for her role as Clarissa.

== Reboot ==
In March 2018, The Hollywood Reporter said a reboot of the show was "in early development" at Nickelodeon. Hart was reportedly to reprise her role as the title character, who would now be a mother. Hart was also to serve as executive producer on the series alongside original series creator Kriegman, who was in talks to return as a writer. The reports were not confirmed by any of the participants.

In March 2022, Hart revealed that the reboot was not moving forward at Nickelodeon.

== In popular culture ==
- The New York electropunk group Mindless Self Indulgence referred to the show in the song "Clarissa" from their 2000 album Frankenstein Girls Will Seem Strangely Sexy.
- In the TV show Melissa & Joey, which also stars Melissa Joan Hart, the character Lennox has a blog titled "Lennox Explains It All", a nod to the show.
- The show has been featured in an online meme-based campaign to bring attention to racism, called "Clarissa Explains White Supremacy".
- In 2015, show creator Mitchell Kriegman wrote a novel, Things I Can't Explain: A Clarissa Novel, described as a "re-imagining" of the show.
