= Nickelodeon Rewind =

Spin-off merchandise brand of Nickelodeon

Nickelodeon Rewind is a spin-off brand of Nickelodeon consisting of DVDs, digital downloads, television blocks, T-shirts, and other merchandise having to do with programs that formerly aired on the channel. Beginning in June 2010, Nickelodeon Rewind was featured as a part of Comcast On Demand programming, with a lineup that features Nicktoons that aired in the 1990s and 2000s. Select episodes of The Angry Beavers, Hey Arnold!, Rugrats, The Fairly OddParents and Doug, are available.

== History ==
Nickelodeon Rewind was originally a collection of DVDs and merchandise that featured "classic" Nickelodeon television shows such as Clarissa Explains It All, The Adventures of Pete and Pete, and You Can't Do That on Television. After being launched in 2005, Nick Rewind entered the realm of television airings with the "Nick Rewind" programming block featured on Nickelodeon during Spring 2006. Nick Rewind was essentially put on hold, with the exception of some Amazon DVD releases, until June 2010 when a Nickelodeon Rewind feature appeared on Comcast through On Demand, featuring episodes of The Angry Beavers, Hey Arnold!, Doug, The Ren & Stimpy Show, and Rugrats. In the UK, Nicktoons was, as of July 2011, airing The Amanda Show as part of the Nicktoons Rewind feature. In 2011, Nickelodeon Rewind went mainstream with the release of DVDs through Shout! Factory and The '90s Are All That (now NickRewind) block of TeenNick.

== DVDs ==
=== The original Nickelodeon Rewind DVDs ===
Nickelodeon Rewind began as a collection of DVDs of older Nickelodeon television shows. The first two DVDs in this collection were released on May 17, 2005: Clarissa Explains It All and The Adventures of Pete and Pete. These DVDs sold so well that Nickelodeon then released Season 2 of Pete and Pete in November 2005. The third season of Pete and Pete, as well as Volume One of "You Can't Do That on Television", were set for release in Spring 2006, but after several postponements, the releases never occurred and are still seen as being "on hiatus." Many suspect this to be due to the split of Viacom from CBS, causing the resignation of Nickelodeon's president, Herb Scannell. Other reports have suggested that the clearances for You Can't Do That on Television were too complicated for a DVD release, since it not only involves the numerous cast members who appeared on the show, but also involves the show's owner, CJOH-TV in Ottawa, Ontario and, in turn, that station's current owner, the CTV Network division of CTVglobemedia.

=== Amazon.com DVDs ===
In 2008, Nickelodeon struck a deal with Amazon.com to release exclusive DVD sets which included various shows, including Doug, Rugrats, Rocko's Modern Life, and Hey Arnold!. These DVDs were widely criticized for being nothing more than DVD-Rs that were burned to order, leading to a prohibitive cost, pricing many out of purchasing them. However, the prices for many of these DVDs were eventually reduced in 2014.

=== Shout Factory DVDs ===
In 2011, Nickelodeon reached a deal with Shout! Factory to release digitally remastered versions of classic Nickelodeon shows on traditional DVD, including Nickelodeon sitcoms and animated series. These shows have included Hey Dude, Rocko's Modern Life, The Angry Beavers, CatDog, Hey Arnold!, Aaahh!!! Real Monsters, The Wild Thornberrys and Danny Phantom.

== Merchandise ==
Nickelodeon Rewind is also a brand of merchandise and clothing relating to older Nickelodeon shows, and was sold exclusively at Hot Topic stores. This collection included items from such shows as Salute Your Shorts, Double Dare, Hey Dude, Rocko's Modern Life, Hey Arnold!, Rugrats, The Fairly OddParents, SpongeBob SquarePants, The Adventures of Pete and Pete, Clarissa Explains It All, Invader Zim, and You Can't Do That on Television. Through Zazzle, Nickelodeon launched a webstore in 2011 that sells classic Nickelodeon merchandise, accessible through the Nickelodeon website.

== 2006 television block ==
Nickelodeon Rewind was an hour long block on Nickelodeon that aired from 1:00 - 2:00 pm EDT every Sunday in Spring 2006. It featured such shows as The Wild Thornberrys, The Angry Beavers, Rocko's Modern Life, Rocket Power, and The Ren & Stimpy Show. It also featured old Nickelodeon bumpers and station ads. Nickelodeon let viewers vote on their website for the shows they most wanted to see each Sunday. Some of these shows were also available on their online video service, TurboNick.

== On demand ==
In 2010, Nick Rewind became available as a subcategory within Nickelodeon's on demand section on Comcast digital cable. It was later added to Verizon Fios, DirecTV and Cablevision. Shows included CatDog, Doug, The Angry Beavers, The Fairly OddParents, Hey Arnold!, and Rugrats, featuring a limited selection of episodes which were rotated periodically. In early-2025, Nick Rewind and all related shows were removed from Nickelodeon's on demand selections.

== 2019 programming block ==
In March 2011, Keith Dawkins, Senior VP and General Manager for Nicktoons and TeenNick, announced that TeenNick would air a television block called "The '90s Are All That" that began airing on July 25, 2011. Nickelodeon made this surprising move in response to overpowering demand from fans who want to re-live their favorite childhood shows. 1990’s Nickelodeon programming has 9 million fans on Facebook alone. The block aired nightly from 10:00pm to 6:00am EST. Shows that last aired on the block were all animated series, including Hey Arnold!, Rugrats, The Wild Thornberrys, Doug, and Rocko's Modern Life. Live-action series from the 1980s, 1990s and early-mid 2000s have previously aired on the block.

On March 18, 2019, the block rebranded to "NickRewind", indirectly reviving the brand until its discontinuation on January 31, 2022.

== Digital download services ==
Nickelodeon Rewind became available on iTunes in July 2007, beginning with Volume 1. Volume 2 was released in May 2008. More recently, several shows have been released under a "Nickelodeon Rewind" section on the Xbox 360's and PlayStation 3's respective video services, as well as the Microsoft Zune.

=== iTunes ===
==== Volume 1 ====
- Aaahh!!! Real Monsters: The Switching Hour
- CatDog: Dog Gone/All You Can't Eat
- The Angry Beavers: Born to be Beavers/Up All Night
- Doug: Doug Bags a Neematoad
- Hey Arnold!: Downtown as Fruits/Eugene's Bike
- Rocket Power: New Squid on the Block/Down the Drain
- Rocko's Modern Life: Carnival Knowledge/Sand in Your Navel

==== Volume 2 ====
- As Told by Ginger: Ginger the Juvie
- The Angry Beavers: A Dam Too Far/Long in the Teeth
- Hey Arnold!: The Little Pink Book/Field Trip
- Rocket Power: Secret Spot/Ice Queens
- Aaahh!!! Real Monsters: Monsters, Get Real/Snorched If You Do, Snorched If You Don't
- Rocko's Modern Life: A Sucker for the Suck-o-Matic/Canned
- Doug: Doug Can't Dance/Doug Gets Busted

==== Volume 3 ====
- Salute Your Shorts: Sponge's Night Out
- Clarissa Explains It All: The Return of Aunt Mafalda
- Hey Dude: Superstition
- Rugrats: Reptar 2010/Stu Gets a Job
- Doug: Doug Takes the Case/Doug's Secret Song
- Aaahh!!! Real Monsters: History of the Monster World, Pt. 1/Fear Thy Name is Ickis
- Hey Arnold!: Stinky Goes Hollywood/Olga Gets Engaged

==== Volume 4 ====
- The Angry Beavers: Long Tall Daggy/Practical Jerks
- Clarissa Explains It All: Poetic Justice
- Hey Arnold!: Dangerous Lumber/Mr. Hyunh Goes Country
- Rocket Power: Merv Links to Otto/Big Air
- Rocko's Modern Life: Lounge Singer/She's The Toad
- Rugrats: The Wild, Wild West/Angelica for a Day
- The Wild Thornberrys: Tiger By the Tail

==== Full seasons and "best of" volumes ====
- The Ren & Stimpy Show: Volumes 1-3
- Allegra's Window: Season 1
- Rugrats: Best of Vol. 1-9; Seasons 1-9
- Hey Arnold!: Best of Vol. 1-8
- Doug: Seasons 1-4
- Rocko's Modern Life: Best of Vol. 1-8
- Rocket Power: Best of Vol. 1-7
- The Amanda Show: Best of Vol. 1-4
- Clarissa Explains It All: Best of Vol. 1-5
- The Angry Beavers: Best of Vol. 1-6
- Hey Dude: Seasons 1-5
- Aaahh!!! Real Monsters: Seasons 1-4
- The Wild Thornberrys: Best of Vol. 1-9
- As Told by Ginger: Volumes 1-6
- Salute Your Shorts: Volumes 1-2
- Invader Zim: Volumes 1-3 & The Complete Series
- The Secret World of Alex Mack: Seasons 1-2
- The Mystery Files of Shelby Woo: Seasons 1-2
- Gullah Gullah Island: Seasons 1-2
- CatDog: Seasons 1-3
- Kenan & Kel: Seasons 1-5
- My Life as a Teenage Robot: Seasons 1-3
- All That: Volumes 1-6
- Are You Afraid of the Dark?: Volumes 1-10
- Oh Yeah! Cartoons: Volumes 1-3
- You Can't Do That on Television: Volumes 1-3
- Family Double Dare: Volumes 1-3
- Super Sloppy Double Dare: Volumes 1-2
- Legends of the Hidden Temple: Volumes 1-3
- Figure It Out: Volumes 1-2
- The Nick Cannon Show: Volumes 1-2
- Nick Arcade: Volumes 1-2
- My Brother and Me: The Complete Series

==== Halloween ====
- Halloween Vol. 1 - 2008
- Halloween Vol. 2 - 2009

==== Holly Jolly Holiday Specials ====
- Holly Jolly Holiday Specials '07 - 2007

==== Themes ====
- Nick Rewind, Sports, Duh? - 2012

=== Zune & Xbox LIVE ===
==== Shows ====
- Aaahh!!! Real Monsters (Seasons 1-2)
- All Grown Up (Season 1)
- Angry Beavers (Season 1)
- Clarissa Explains It All (Best of, Vol. 1)
- Doug (Seasons 1-2)
- Hey Arnold! (Seasons 1-3)
- Hey Dude (Seasons 1-2)
- The Ren & Stimpy Show (Seasons 1-3)
- Rocko's Modern Life (Seasons 1-2)
- Rugrats (Seasons 1-2)
- Rugrats: Tommy Pickles: Natural Bald Leader!
- Salute Your Shorts (Seasons 1-2)
- The Secret World of Alex Mack (Season 1)

=== PlayStation Store ===
==== Shows ====
- Aaahh!!! Real Monsters (Seasons 1-2)
- The Amanda Show (Best of, Vol. 1-2)
- The Angry Beavers (Best of, Vol. 1-2)
- Clarissa Explains It All (Best of, Vol. 1)
- Doug (Seasons 1-2)
- Hey Arnold! (Seasons 1-2)
- Hey Dude (Season 1)
- The Ren & Stimpy Show (Best of, Vol. 1-3)
- Rocket Power (Best of, Vol. 1)
- Rocko's Modern Life (Best of, Vol. 1-2)
- Rugrats (Best of, Vol. 1-2, Tommy Pickles: Natural Bald Leader!)
- The Wild Thornberrys (Best of, Vol. 1)

== See also ==
- NickRewind
