= Locked Up: A Mother's Rage =

1991 television film

- Genre: Drama
- Written by: Selma Thompson; Robert L. Freedman
- Directed by: Bethany Rooney
- Starring: Cheryl Ladd; Diana Muldaur; Jean Smart; Angela Bassett; Ariana Richards
- Music by: J.A.C. Redford
- Country of origin: United States
- Original language: English

Production
- Executive producer: Steve White
- Producer: Barry Bernardi
- Cinematography: Chuck Arnold
- Editor: Joanna Cappuccilli Lovetti
- Running time: 94 minutes
- Production company: Steve White Productions

Original release
- Network: CBS
- Release: October 29, 1991

Locked Up: A Mother's Rage is a 1991 television film starring Cheryl Ladd, Diana Muldaur and Jean Smart about a mother wrongly convicted of drug trafficking. Ariana Richards, who played Kelly Gallagher, was awarded the Young Artist Award, Best Young Actress in Television Movie, at the 14th Youth in Film Awards.

== Synopsis ==
Annie Gallagher is a mother who was sent to jail over charges of drug trafficking. She is innocent, as the true culprit was her boyfriend, who framed her.

== Cast ==
- Cheryl Ladd as Annie Gallagher
- Jean Smart as Cathy
- Dean Norris as Mike
- Ariana Richards as Kelly Gallagher
- Angela Bassett as Willie
- Kimberly Scott as Sherisse
- Vanessa Marquez as Yo-Yo
- Peter Reckell as Danny
- Diana Muldaur as Frances
- Joshua Harris
- Sarah Martineck

== Production ==
Filming took place in Los Angeles, California during July 1991 under the title They're Doing My Time. This title was later changed to Locked Up: A Mother's Rage prior to its premiere on CBS. Filming was completed by September of the same year.

Cheryl Ladd was brought in to portray the film's central character of Annie Gallagher, while Angela Bassett portrayed a tough inmate who gradually befriends the wrongly convicted woman. Bethany Rooney adapted the script, which was written by Selma Thompson and Robert L. Freedman. The script is based on a true story. Actress Jean Smart commented on the script, stating that part of its intent was to highlight the experiences and struggles of inmates and their children.

== Release ==
Locked Up first aired on October 29, 1991 on CBS. The movie is also known under the titles They're Doing My Time and The Other Side of Love.

After its initial airing the film was released on VHS in the United Kingdom through Guild Home Video and in Sweden through Videoteket. It has also been released to DVD during 2007 through Direct Source Special Products.

== Reception ==
Critical reception was mixed upon its initial release, with much of the praise centering on Ladd's performance and the criticism focusing on the script. Chris Williams of the Los Angeles Times criticized the film, writing that "Ladd isn’t really the problem with this telepicture, which has among its woes a script stuck somewhere in the twilight zone between the cliches of old-fashioned women-behind-bars pictures and an unrequited desire for fleeting realism." Susan Stewart of the Detroit Free Press was also critical, stating that the film "will have you sniffling even as your brain is telling your weeping eyes that they are a piece of trash." Marc Berman reviewed the film for Variety, praising several of the movie's performances while also noting that it "flirts uncomfortably with racist and male sexist tenets - not to mention pandering to cheap sentimentality."

The reviewer for the Wisconsin State Journal was more favorable, praising Ladd's performance.

=== Awards ===
- Best Young Actress in Television Movie at the 14th Youth in Film Awards (won, Ariana Richards)
- Best Young Actor in Television Movie at the 14th Youth in Film Awards (nominated, Joshua Harris)
- Best Young Actress Under 10 in Television Movie at the 14th Youth in Film Awards (nominated, Sarah Martineck)
