= David Brisbin =

American actor (born 1952)

- Born: June 26, 1952
- Occupation: Actor
- Years active: 1985–present
- Spouse: Laura Innes

David Brisbin (born June 26, 1952) is an American television actor known for his role as Benjamin Ernst on the Nickelodeon television show Hey Dude. He also played recurring character Dr. Alexander Babcock on ER.

== Early life and career ==
Brisbin grew up in Minneapolis, Minnesota and attended Augsburg College. Originally interested in choral music and wishing to become a conductor, he developed an interest in stage acting with the support of the head of the drama department at Augsburg. After leaving Minneapolis, he moved to Bellingham, Washington where he continued his stage career for two years before a friend convinced him to move to San Francisco to work in experimental theater. From there, he moved to New York City where, as of 1987, he had lived and worked for 10 years, appearing in political and experimental theater as well as in The Big Blue, and on television with roles in All My Children and Another World.

== Mainstream acting career ==
From 1989 to 1991, Brisbin had a starring role on Hey Dude as Benjamin Ernst, a divorced New York accountant who purchases a dude ranch in Arizona to escape his high-pressure job. Brisbin's character was portrayed as a well-meaning and kind, yet somewhat awkward and bumbling father figure to his young son and a ranch staff of teenagers.

He had small supporting roles in Forrest Gump, Erin Brockovich, Twin Peaks: Fire Walk with Me (later cut and included in The Missing Pieces), and Leaving Las Vegas. Between 1998 and 2002 he had a recurring role on ER as anesthesiologist Dr. Alexander Babcock. He also appeared as Dr. Sugarman on Desperate Housewives and on The West Wing.

== Personal life ==
Brisbin is married to actress Laura Innes.
