= Joe O'Connor (actor) =

American actor

- Occupation: Actor
- Years active: 1979, 1991–present

Joe O'Connor is an American actor best known for playing Marshall Darling, father of the title character in the television series Clarissa Explains It All.

== Career ==
O'Connor's first television role was in the TV series Emergency! in 1979, playing a sailor in the episode "The Convention". He gained fame when he joined the cast of the television series Clarissa Explains It All (1991–1994), in which he played Marshall Darling, father of the title character.

After this, he only appeared in several episodes of other television series, and in several TV and feature films. In 1996, he appeared in the episode ""A Girl and Her Cat" of Sabrina, the Teenage Witch, which reunited him with Melissa Joan Hart, who played the main character in both Sabrina and Clarissa. He later appeared on other TV series including Friends (in 1997), Malcolm in the Middle (2003), Melrose Place (three episodes in 1998), Without a Trace (2008), Private (four episodes in 2009), Mad Men (in six episodes, between 2007 and 2013) and The Young and the Restless (in four episodes, in 2011).

Films in which he has appeared include A Bedtime Story (1997), The Chaos Factor (2000) and Exposed (2003). Television films in which he has appeared include Taking Back Our Town and When Billie Beat Bobby.

== Filmography ==
Film roles
Year	Title	Role	Notes
1997	A Bedtime Story	Husband	Short film
1997	The Ice Storm	Marty	
2000	The Chaos Factor	Wicks	
2003	Exposed	Congressman Lewis	
2011	The Green Hornet	Daily Sentinel Reporter	
2012	Leader of the Pack	Frank	Short film

Television roles
Year	Title	Role	episodes
1979	Emergency!	Sailor	Episode: "The Convention"; uncredited
1991–1994	Clarissa Explains It All	Marshall Darling	Main role
1996	Sabrina, the Teenage Witch	Joe	Episode: "A Girl and Her Cat"
1997	Friends	Stevens	Episode: "The One with the Ultimate Fighting Champion"
1997	Grace Under Fire	Viewer at the press conferences	Episode: "Finders Keepers"
1998	The Practice	Minister	Episodes: "State of Mind", "Swearing In"
1998	Melrose Place	Michael's Attorney	Episodes: "The Usual Santas", "When Cheerleaders Attack", "Lethal Wedding 4"
1998	Encore! Encore!	Leland Jr.	Episode: "The Diary"
1999	The Jamie Foxx Show	Producer	Episode: "Change of Heart"
1999	Katie Joplin	Mr. Geist	Episode: "Charcoaled Gray"
2000	Bull	Denny	Episode: "Final Hour"
2000	Boston Public	Mr. Potter	Episode: "Chapter Four"
2000–2001	The West Wing	Rep. Calhoun, Congressman #3	Episode: "Bartlet for America", "The White House Pro-Am"
2001	Diagnosis Murder	Bendix	Episode: "Being of Sound Mind"
2001	Maybe It's Me	Bob	Episode: "The Exchange-Student Episode"
2001	Taking Back Our Town	Businessman	Television movie
2001	When Billie Beat Bobby	Producer	Television movie
2002	Meet the Marks	Joe Marks (Dad)	Main role
2002	Apple Valley Knights	Mr. Drysdale	Main role
2002	Becker	Mr. Engel	Episode: "Atlas Shirked:
2003	ER	Mr. Scott	Episode: "A Saint in the City"
2003	L.A. Dragnet	Tobias	Episode: "All That Glitters"
2003	Malcolm in the Middle	Jones	Episode: "Academic Octathalon"
2003	Charmed	Employer; News Editor	Episode: "Love's a Witch"; uncredited Episode: "All Hell Breaks Loose"
2005	The War at Home	Bruce	Episode: "Like a Virgin"
2006	Commander in Chief	Andrew McIntyre	Episode: "Sub Enchanted Evening"
2006	Cold Case	Chuck Dawson	Episode: "Detention"
2006	Close to Home	Gil Joffee	Episode: "A Father's Story"
2007	Crossing Jordan	Alan Manning	Episode: "Shattered"
2007	Halfway Home	Carly's Dad / Mr. Barzac	Episodes: "Halfway Parent's Day", "Halfway Hot"
2007	Smith	Kimes	Episode: "Seven"
2007	The Nine	John Peterson	Episode: "You're Being Watched"
2008	Without a Trace	Nate Simmons	Episode: "Driven"
2008	Reno 911!	Preacher	Episodes: "Junior Runs for Office", "Undercover at Burger Cousin"
2009	Brothers & Sisters	Harvey Childs	Episode: "Missing"
2009	Private	Detective Hill	4 episodes
2009	Maneater	Minister	Television miniseries
2010	Miami Medical	Mike	Episode: "What Lies Beneath"
2010	Weeds	Paul	Episode: "A Yippity Sippity"
2007–2013	Mad Men	Tom Vogel	Recurring role, 6 episodes
2010	Castle	Cal Townsend	Episode: "3XK"
2011	The Young and the Restless	Gus	Recurring role
2012	Bones	Larry Barron	Episode: "The But in the Joke"
2012	NCIS	Pat Gillespie	Episode: "You Better Watch Out"
2013	How I Met Your Mother	Cassie's Dad	Episode: "Knight Vision"
2016	All the Way	Senator Byrd	Television movie
2018-2020	Blue Bloods	Officer Malone/Malone	3 episodes
2019	The L Word: Generation Q	Jack	Episode: "Let's Do It Again"
