= Sean O'Neal =

American actor (born 1975)

- Born: November 29, 1975 (age 50); Tampa, Florida, US
- Occupation: Actor
- Years active: 1991–1994, 2009, 2013, 2016

Sean O’Neal (born November 29, 1975) is an American actor. He is best known for portraying Sam Anders in the television show Clarissa Explains It All. After Clarissa, he appeared in other TV series including Development Hell and the 2016 film Penumbra.

== Filmography ==
Year	Title	Role	Notes
1991–1994	Clarissa Explains It All	Sam Anders	Regular role
1993	Cop and a 1/2	McNally	Credited as Sean Evan O'Neal
2013	Development Hell	Protester #1	2 episodes, "You Are Tearing Me Apart, Damien!" and "It Was My Goat!"
2016	Penumbra	Party Guest	

== Awards ==
O'Neal was nominated for two Young Artist Awards (at the time known as the Youth in Film Awards) for his work on Clarissa Explains It All: Best Young Actor Starring in an Off-Prime Time or Cable Series in 1991 and Best Young Actor Co-Starring in a Cable Series in 1992.
