= The Flood: Who Will Save Our Children? =

- Release poster
- Teleplay by: David J. Kinghorn
- Story by: Donna Kanter; David J. Kinghorn
- Directed by: Chris Thomson
- Starring: Joe Spano; David Lascher; Michael A. Goorjian
- Music by: Garry McDonald; Laurie Stone
- Original language: English

Production
- Producer: Donna Kanter
- Cinematography: Barry M. Wilson
- Editors: Trevor Jolly; Philip Watts
- Running time: 96 min.
- Production company: The Wolper Organization

Original release
- Network: NBC
- Release: October 10, 1993

The Flood: Who Will Save Our Children? is a 1993 American television film, starring Joe Spano, David Lascher and Michael A. Goorjian. It was directed by Chris Thomson and written by Donna Kanter and David J. Kinghorn. The movie is based on a real-life event that occurred on July 17, 1987, when a group of people was swept up by a flash flood on the Guadalupe River near the city of Comfort. At the time, it was the worst flood of the Guadalupe River since 1932. Ten people died, including a teenager who fell from a helicopter while being rescued when the rope broke. Of the ten fatalities, one body was never found.

== Plot ==
In the city of Comfort, Texas, a Baptist community organizes a summer camp with young people from all over the USA. On the way back from the camp, the convoy of vehicles carrying the participants is surprised by a flash flood when crossing the Guadalupe River, near the city of San Antonio. A bus and a van are stranded in the middle of the river and the young passengers are forced to hurry out of these two vehicles, and are swept away by the current. In the midst of chaos, the young have to fight to survive, while the rescue teams struggle against time to save them. Even a TV helicopter is employed in the rescue. Although most of the children are rescued, the emotional effects of the uncertainty and deaths on the survivors, rescuers and families is a key part of the character development of the film. The film ends at a memorial service held at the site of the incident.

== Cast ==
- Joe Spano as Dr. Richard Koons
- David Lascher as Brad Jamison
- Michael A. Goorjian as Scott Chapman
- Amy Van Nostrand as Linda Smith
- Norm Skaggs as Jerry Smith
- Renee O'Connor as Leslie
- Scott Michael Campbell as Mike Smith
- Blayne Weaver as Jeff Bowman
- Lisa Rieffel as Leanne Pond
- David Franklin as Dave Villareal
- Kim Krejus as Mrs Chapman
- Jerome Ehlers as Ray Masterman
- Holly Brisley as Tonya Smith
