= Elizabeth Hess =

Canadian actress

- Born: 17 July 1953 (age 71); Ontario, Canada
- Occupation(s): Actor, playwright, Director, Arts Educator
- Website: http://www.elizabethhess.net

Elizabeth Hess (born 17 July 1953 in Ontario, Canada) is a Canadian-American actress, playwright, director and arts educator.

On TV, she is best known for playing the mother Janet Darling on the long-running American sitcom Clarissa Explains It All. She has also appeared on several episodes of Law & Order.

Her acting resume also includes work on-and off-Broadway, regional theater, TV, independent films and award-winning solo works that have traveled the globe. She played Renee in the Tony Award winning production of M. Butterfly. She received her training from The London Academy of Music and Dramatic Art (LAMDA) and studied privately with acting coach Harold Guskin.

She has taught acting principally at New York University's (NYU) Tisch School of the Arts, Fordham University and at the Eugene O'Neill Theater Center/National Theater Institute.
