= Joshua Harris (actor) =

American actor

- Born: November 27, 1978 (age 46)
- Occupation(s): Child actor, baseball player, television producer
- Years active: 1984–1992 (acting); 2003–present (producing)

Joshua Harris (born November 27, 1978) is an American former child actor, former baseball player, and television producer. He is known for playing Christopher Ewing on the primetime soap opera Dallas from 1985 to 1991.

== Overview ==
Harris began acting at the age of six and appeared on television from 1984 to 1993. As Bobby and Pam Ewing's adopted son Christopher Ewing, he was a regular cast member on Dallas from 1985 through 1991. He guest starred on other series including Falcon Crest, Twin Peaks, Star Trek: The Next Generation, and The Commish. He also appeared in several television movie roles based on true stories. The first was A Death in California (1985), in which he played the youngest child of Cheryl Ladd's character. His best known movie role was playing a boy dying of AIDS in the made-for-TV film Go Toward the Light (1988). He again appeared with Cheryl Ladd in Locked Up: A Mother's Rage (1991).

At the age of 15, Harris began playing baseball in school, and continued to play in college. After graduating from the University of San Diego with a bachelor's degree in Business, he played professionally for the Chicago Cubs' minor-league affiliate the Lansing Lugnuts for one season.

Following this he became a producer for production company New Wave Entertainment. In 2006, he started his own production company, 4th Wall Entertainment, specializing in television development, documentaries, commercials, feature films, and digital platforms.
