= David Lascher =

American actor

- Born: David Scott Lascher; April 27, 1972 (age 54); Scarsdale, New York, U.S.
- Occupation: Actor
- Years active: 1989–present
- Spouse: Jill London (m. 1999)
- Children: 3

David Scott Lascher (born April 27, 1972) is an American actor best known for his roles as Vinnie on Blossom, Josh on Sabrina, the Teenage Witch, Kyle Conners on Beverly Hills, 90210, and Ted McGriff on the Nickelodeon show Hey Dude.

== Life and career ==
Lascher was born in Scarsdale, New York, to a psychotherapist mother and a lawyer father. He attended Scarsdale High School and has three sisters: Alexandra, Carly, and Lauren.

Lascher is best known for playing the lovable troublemaker Ted McGriff on Nickelodeon's comedy Hey Dude in the early 1990s. He went on to play Kyle Conners on the FOX drama series Beverly Hills, 90210 from 1991 to 1992, and Vinnie Bonitardi, the boyfriend of Blossom Russo, on the NBC sitcom Blossom from 1992 to 1993. On Sabrina the Teenage Witch, he played Sabrina's love interest Josh, a coffee shop manager and later a photographer. On May 23, 2006, Lascher appeared on the NBC chat program Last Call with Carson Daly as a Ryan Seacrest clone in a parody of that evening's American Idol finale.

In 2014, Lascher co-wrote and produced the film Sister with Todd Camhe, which Lascher also directed. Sister premiered at the Tribeca Film Festival in 2014.

== Filmography ==
=== Film ===
Year	Title	Role	Notes
1996	White Squall	Robert March	
2008	Starlet	Todd	Short film
2011	South	The Man	Short film

=== Television ===
Year	Title	Role	Notes
1989–1991	Hey Dude	Ted McGriff	Main role
1990	A Family for Joe	Nick Bankston	Main role
1991	Full House	Rick	Episode: "Take My Sister, Please"
1991	Life Goes On	Mitch Tanner	Episode: "Duelling Divas"
1991	Roseanne	Eric	Episode: "Vegas Interruptus"
1991	She Says She’s Innocent	Ryan	TV Movie
1992	Step by Step	Greg Patterson	Episode: "Country Club"
1991–1992	Beverly Hills, 90210	Kyle Conners	3 episodes
1992–1994	Blossom	Vinnie Bonitardi	Main role (seasons 3–4); guest role (seasons 2 & 5)
1993	The Flood: Who Will Save Our Children?	Brad Jamison	TV Movie
1994	Cries Unheard: The Donna Yaklich Story	Denny Yaklich - age 18	TV Movie
1994	The All-New Mickey Mouse Club (MMC)	Himself	
1996	Twisted Desire	Brad	TV Movie
1996	Kidz in the Wood	Sloan	TV Movie
1996–1997	Clueless	Josh	Main role (season 1)
1998	Veronica's Closet	Jeremy Byrne	2 episodes
1999	Touched By An Angel	Jett	Episode: "My Brother's Keeper" (season 5)
1999	Two of a Kind	Matt Burke	5 episodes
1999–2002	Sabrina, the Teenage Witch	Josh	Main role (seasons 4–6)
2006	Mystery Woman: Redemption	Tyler Dell	TV movie
2009	Always and Forever	Gabe Sanchez	TV movie
2014	Melissa & Joey	Charlie	3 episodes
2017	The Boat Builder	Charles	
2018	Hollywood Darlings	David	Episode: "Dry Spell"
2023	The Other Two	Travis	Episode: "Brooke & Cary & Curtis & Lance"
2026	Marshals	Andrew Schroeder	Episode: "The Gathering Storm"
