= Nancy Youngblut =

American actress

- Born: Nancy Sue Youngblut
- Education: The College of St. Catherine; University of Georgia (MFA)
- Occupation: Actress
- Known for: Rebel; Weeds

Nancy Sue Youngblut is an American actress. She has appeared on stage on Broadway as Agnes in Burn This, and on episodic television including Bones, Cold Case, The Unit, ER, CSI: Crime Scene Investigation, Star Trek: Deep Space Nine, Diagnosis: Murder, Star Trek: Voyager, Dr. Quinn, Medicine Woman and Murphy Brown.

== Early life and education ==
A native of Iowa, Youngblut is one of six children of Mr. and Mrs. Jim Youngblut. As a student at Don Bosco High School, she had the title role in a production of Hello, Dolly!, and that focused her attention on acting. She subsequently graduated from The College of St. Catherine in Minnesota with a bachelor's degree in speech and theater and from the University of Georgia with a master's degree in acting and directing.

== Career ==
Youngblut worked as a magician's assistant for six weeks, and she supported herself in New York City by being a waitress and a typist. Her acting career began with "seasons with various theatrical companies around the country". In 1980 she performed in Vanities in Lancaster, Pennsylvania, and in 1981 she was in Chapter Two in Harrisburg, Pennsylvania.

== Personal life ==
In 1969 Youngblut married Bill Schneider in Raymond, Iowa. She later married art historian and college professor Joe Futtner; they have a son.
