= NickRewind =

American late-night programming block

- Final logo used for the block from March 18, 2019 to January 31, 2022, this logo is currently used on its social media pages
- Network: TeenNick
- Launched: July 25, 2011
- Closed: January 31, 2022 (10 years, 6 months and 6 days)
- Country of origin: United States
- Owner: ViacomCBS Domestic Media Networks
- Formerly known as: The '90s Are All That (2011–15); The Splat (2015–17); NickSplat (2017–19)
- Sister network: Nickelodeon; Nick at Nite; TeenNick; Nicktoons; Nick Jr. Channel; NickMusic

NickRewind (formerly The '90s Are All That, The Splat, and NickSplat) was an American late night programming block that aired nightly over the channel space of TeenNick. The block showed reruns of mid-late 1980s, 1990s, and early-mid 2000s children's programming, mostly shows that aired on Nickelodeon during their original runs. Collectively under all of its various brands, TeenNick's overnight classic programming block ran from July 25, 2011 to January 31, 2022.

The block was preceded by The '90s Are All That, which debuted the night of July 25, 2011 (early July 26) and was inspired by a large amount of interest in classic Nickelodeon series from the 1990s by users of social media outlets such as Facebook. From October 7, 2011 to October 23, 2011, the block aired in an earlier time slot, from 10 p.m. to midnight. Response to the debut was very positive; hashtags pertaining to the block became trending topics on Twitter and the Nielsen Ratings for TeenNick on the debut night increased to between eight and 60 times the ratings TeenNick received in previous weeks, beating numerous higher-profile basic cable programs in the same time slot.

Beginning October 5, 2015, the block expanded to eight hours (10 p.m. to 6 a.m.) and began airing a broader variety of series. Renamed as "The Splat", the block's name and logo came from Nickelodeon's logo from 1984; a white brush-printed wordmark on an amorphous orange background (often manifested as a "splat" shape, but which was frequently rendered in many others). To align itself with Nickelodeon's cross-platform branding, the block changed its name to NickSplat on May 1, 2017. The block would adopt its final name on March 18, 2019, and would end on January 31, 2022, returning TeenNick to 24-hour programming. The YouTube channel for the block continues to post compilation content from past Nickelodeon shows.

== History ==
=== 2011–15: as The '90s Are All That ===
Original logo as "The '90s Are All That", used from July 25, 2011, until October 12, 2013

The final week of 2011, dubbed "Party Like It's the '90s", featured shows originally featured in the 1995 through 1999 incarnation of SNICK. KaBlam! and Animorphs were excluded and replaced with other SNICK programs of the era. This also included '90s Nick IDs. The December 31 edition, called "Stick Clark's New Year's Sticking Eve", featured the revival of "U-Dip," another Nick in the Afternoon feature, as an homage of the large list of objects dropped on New Year's Eve across the United States. Nickelodeon's trademark slime won the vote. The block started at 10 pm and ended at 2 am, with a re-air from 2 am–6 am, to accommodate the occasion.

=== 2015–19: as The Splat/NickSplat ===
"The Splat" logo, used from October 5, 2015, to April 30, 2017

On September 11, 2015, the block's Facebook page announced a new program block called "The Splat". It was later confirmed that The Splat would launch on October 5, 2015, and run for eight hours. The same general format and program library were being used, with less repetition of series; whereas The '90s Are All That aired most of its shows five days a week, The Splat added a few shows into the rotation that had either not yet been seen on the previous block or had only aired as special presentations, no longer airing them on a set weekly schedule. These programs also included programs that originally aired in the 1980s and the 2000s.

On November 23, The Splat and Nick at Nite simulcast a Double Dare reunion show upon the series' 30th anniversary. The special featured the cast of All That participating in a new first-run episode of the game; to accommodate the simulcast, The Splat began airing an hour earlier than usual.

The "NickSplat" logo, used from May 1, 2017, to March 17, 2019

To align itself with Nickelodeon's cross-platform branding, The Splat was renamed NickSplat on May 1, 2017.

=== 2019–22: as NickRewind ===
On March 18, 2019, the block, along with its social media presences, was officially renamed "NickRewind".

On January 31, 2022, the branding ended, though traditional TeenNick content had begun to air overnights in mid-December 2021. Although there was no initial announcement, the end of the block was confirmed by NickRewind's Twitter account on February 2, 2022, which directed viewers to watch the block's programming on Pluto TV (which had been carrying much of the same content as NickRewind since May 2019) and Paramount+. Meanwhile, NickRewind’s social media pages on Twitter, Facebook, Instagram and YouTube channel remain active, with the YouTube channel concentrating more on live-action Nickelodeon shows made post-2000, such as iCarly, Victorious and Sam & Cat.

=== 2023–present: Pluto TV revival as 90s Kids ===
On October 17, 2023, Nickelodeon launched a linear channel on the Paramount-owned FAST service Pluto TV titled 90s Kids, which features the same programming and on-air branding as NickRewind but with a new name and logo. Regular programs on the channel include Rugrats, Hey Arnold!, Doug and CatDog, all of which received frequent airplay on the former block.

Another Pluto TV channel, titled 90s Kids 2, was silently launched on April 1, 2025 to coincide with Nickelodeon's 46th anniversary. The second channel features 1990s series seldom-aired on the block, including GUTS, KaBlam! and The Amanda Show, alongside 2000s series such as Drake & Josh, Zoey 101 and Rugrats spin-off All Grown Up!.

== Media and merchandise ==
As part of the launch of "The '90s Are All That" in 2011, the block had its own dedicated website, which featured clips, the schedule, and voting sections.

In September 2015, along with the announcement of the block's relaunch as "The Splat", a new keyboard app was announced to be released to the Apple App Store and Google Play. Titled "The Splat Emoji Keyboard" and developed by Snaps Media, the app features pictures and GIFs of 90s Nicktoons characters and various objects. The app was released in October 2015, coinciding with the launch of The Splat.

== International versions ==
=== United Kingdom ===
In 2016, Nickelodeon UK launched a British version of "NickSplat". Instead of it being a block, it's an online-only service on Nick.co.uk. For a limited time in 2017, Nicktoons UK broadcast some of the shows from the block.

=== Netherlands and Flanders ===
On December 12, 2016, Nickelodeon Netherlands & Flanders launched a Dutch version of "NickSplat" simply called "Splat". The block airs on weeknights at midnight since the channel was extended to 24/7 programming. The block was ended in 2021.

=== Russia ===
In 2019, a YouTube channel of the same name was created, where archival shows and clips were posted there up until February 22, 2022.

=== Latin America ===
In August 2020, Nickelodeon Latin America launched a localized version of "NickRewind" airing older Nickelodeon shows from the 1990s to the 2010s, it only aired for a month.

=== Germany ===
A NickRewind branded channel has been available on Pluto TV since August 3, 2020.

=== Australia ===
A NickRewind-branded channel has been available on 10Play since August 1, 2023.

== See also ==
- TeenNick
