= Hey Dude =

American television sitcom (1989–1991)

- Genre: Teen sitcom; Western
- Created by: Dee LaDuke
- Directed by: Ross K. Bagwell Jr.; Frederick King Keller
- Starring: David Brisbin; Kelly Brown; Geoffrey Coy; Jonathan Galkin; Debra Kalman; David Lascher; Christine Taylor; Joe Torres; Josh Tygiel
- Theme music composer: Dale Jarvis
- Composer: Long Run Music
- Country of origin: United States
- Original language: English
- No. of seasons: 5
- No. of episodes: 65

Production
- Executive producer: Geoffrey Darby
- Producer: Stephen Land
- Camera setup: Multi-camera
- Running time: 24–25 minutes
- Production company: Cinetel Productions

Original release
- Network: Nickelodeon
- Release: July 14, 1989 – August 30, 1991

Hey Dude is an American Western comedy series created by Dee LaDuke that aired on Nickelodeon from July 14, 1989, to August 30, 1991, consisting of 65 half-hour episodes produced over five seasons. It is set on the fictional Bar None Ranch in Tucson, Arizona. It portrays the lives of the ranch owner, his son, their ranch hand, and four teenage summer employees. The series is aimed primarily at a teenage audience.

== Premise ==
Benjamin Ernst, a divorced, good-natured, somewhat bumbling father from New Jersey, bought the Bar None Dude Ranch seeking escape from his high-pressure job as a New York City accountant. His accident-prone son, Buddy, is displeased with the change of environment, primarily because he is unable to use his skateboard on the desert sand. In Season 1 of the series, the teenage staff consisted of two boys and two girls: Ted, an enterprising troublemaker; Danny, an easy-going Hopi teenager and Ted's best friend; girl-next-door Melody; and Brad, a rich girl from Grosse Pointe, Michigan. Though Brad often wears dressy designer outfits at work, she is a competent horse rider. Her love-hate relationship with Ted is a plot thread during the first half of the series. After David Lascher left the show during Season 3 in 1990, Ted was replaced by Ernst's nephew Jake, an eccentric slacker who likes to play the drums. Not long after, Kyle, a somewhat dim but handsome cowboy type, joined the ranch. When Ted returned to the show, he and Kyle became romantic rivals for Brad. The show's only other featured adult is Lucy, a tough, authoritative ranch hand. She is sometimes viewed as a mother figure to the teens and they often ask her for advice. Each episode begins with a cold open that usually ends with a pun. After that, the show's logo appears over the end of the cold open. Each character is then introduced as a horseshoe flips, followed again by the show's logo, after which the opening sequence fades out. Each episode ends with an instrumental version of the show's theme song while the credits roll over stills from the episode.

== Characters ==
A skeptical Buddy (Josh Tygiel, left) tries to ignore Ted (David Lascher) and his scheming in the episode "Suspicion"

- David Brisbin as Benjamin Ernst Sr., ranch owner who had been a successful East Coast accountant
- Kelly Brown as Bradley "Brad" Taylor, riding instructor from a rich Grosse Pointe, Michigan family
- Debra Kalman as Lucy, ranch hand foreman and supervisor
- David Lascher as Ted McGriff, senior staff
- Christine Taylor as Melody Hanson, lifeguard and dance instructor from Allentown, Pennsylvania
- Joe Torres as Danny Lightfoot, a Hopi teenager
- Geoffrey Coy as Kyle Chandler, Lucy's ex-boyfriend's son
- Jonathan Galkin as Jake Decker, Mr. Ernst's nephew from Los Angeles, California
- Josh Tygiel as Benjamin "Buddy" Ernst Jr., Mr. Ernst's son who spends summers with his father at the ranch
- Cassie as Buddy's dog, featured in Season 1, but was absent in Season 2

Lascher and Torres were nominated for a 1991 Young Artist Award in the Best Youth Variety or Game Show category for their roles on Hey Dude.

== Production ==
Hey Dude was videotaped on location at the Tanque Verde Guest Ranch in Tucson, Arizona. The show was produced by Cinetel Productions. Casting began in 1988 with local auditions held in Tucson. Josh Tygiel, who was cast as protagonist Buddy Ernst, was one of 120 Tucson-area boys who auditioned for the series. Joe Torres was cast as Danny Lightfoot after auditioning in Tucson for the role.

While most of the show was technically shot on the property of the Tanque Verde Guest Ranch, the familiar "ranch" that was known to television viewers was actually built from scratch roughly a mile away from the main public areas. This was done so ranch guests would not be bothered by the production and to create buildings with a more "western" look, which was not offered by the relatively modern and luxurious Tanque Verde. The main lodge, boys and girls bunks, guest lodge (which doubled as cast dressing rooms) and the stable were all built specifically for the production.

After the show ended production, the buildings were abandoned and several are still standing to this day, albeit in much disrepair. The swimming pool that was frequently used on the show is the main pool for the Tanque Verde Guest Ranch and is still in use by guests. The set is located at 32°14′26″N 110°41′24″W, about fifteen miles east of Tucson, Arizona.

== Podcast and Cast Reunion ==
In December 2022, Lascher and Taylor began a video based podcast called "Hey Dude... The 90s Called!" The duo frequently discuss their time on the series. Each episode also features a guest who worked in the entertainment industry in the 1990s, including a variety of their co-stars from the show. In January 2026 the entire main cast reunited (along with several writers) and filmed a live reunion broadcast on location at Tanque Verde Guest Ranch. It was the first time they had reunited as a group since the show stopped airing, and for most their first visit back to the original sets. It was also the first time any cast members had seen Torres since 1991, and a chance to put to rest ongoing rumors to his whereabouts.

== Episodes ==
The series ran for 65 episodes across five seasons between 1989 and 1991, spanning just over two years. Each season takes place over the course of one summer in the lives of ranch staff, with cast members often recalling pranks and colleagues from previous summers.

=== Series overview ===
Season	Episodes	Originally released	
Season	Episodes	First released	Last released
1	13	July 14, 1989	October 8, 1989
2	13	October 15, 1989	January 27, 1990
3	13	April 7, 1990	June 30, 1990
4	13	September 8, 1990	December 14, 1990
5	13	June 7, 1991	August 30, 1991

=== Season 1 (1989) ===
No. overall	No. in season	Title	Directed by	Written by	Original release date
1	1	"Day One at the Bar None"	Ross K. Bagwell Jr.	Alan Goodman	July 14, 1989
The series premiere of "Hey Dude" introduced us to the show's main characters: Ted, Danny, Brad, Lucy, Melody, Mr. Ernst, and his accident-prone son, Buddy.
2	2	"Battle of the Sexes"	Ross K. Bagwell Jr.	Michael B. Kaplan	July 23, 1989
When Ted and Danny challenge Melody and Brad to a battle of the sexes, it's every boy and girl for theirselves. Who will win? And who will be the first to resort to dirty tactics? Meanwhile, Danny is upset because no one remembered his birthday.
3	3	"Goldilocks"	Ross K. Bagwell Jr.	Alan Goodman	July 30, 1989
Buddy is a young boy who lives on a ranch. He becomes very fond of one of the horses on the ranch. When his father decides to sell the horse, Buddy is very angry.
4	4	"Ted's Saddle"	Fred C. Keller	Judy Spencer	August 6, 1989
Ted wants to buy a saddle that was owned by John Wayne. To earn the money, he starts doing odd jobs for guests. However, he neglects his normal duties, leaving the rest of the staff to pick up the slack.
5	5	"The Competition"	Ross K. Bagwell Jr.	Graham Yost	August 13, 1989
Brad and Melody compete for a chance to lead overnight camping trips. Unfortunately for them Ted is put in charge of seeing who is the most qualified.
6	6	"Rehearsal for Romance"	Fred K. Keller	Michael B. Kaplan	August 20, 1989
Melody wants a date with a cute guy she sees at the lodge so she enrolls in "The Ted School of Romance". Mr. Ernst tries to market official Bar None merchandise.
7	7	"Perfect Father"	Fred K. Keller	Graham Yost	August 27, 1989
Two crooks visit the Bar None with intentions to rob the place.
8	8	"The Good, the Bad, the Obnoxious"	Fred K. Keller	Clifford Fagin	September 3, 1989
Brad's snobby enemy from school visits the ranch and gives the staff a hard time. Meanwhile, Mr. Ernst tries to make a promotional video for the Bar None.
9	9	"Rainmen"	Ross K. Bagwell Jr.	Mark Cerulli	September 10, 1989
Danny must choose between his friends and his Native American heritage when a drought hits the Bar None threatening the water supply.
10	10	"Ted and Brad Get Handcuffed"	Ross K. Bagwell Jr.	Graham Yost	September 17, 1989
Buddy pretends to be a magician. To teach Brad a lesson, Ted decides to use Buddy's handcuffs to attach himself to Brad. As it turns out, they aren't "trick cuffs" like he thought... they belong to a real-life prisoner!
11	11	"Suspicion"	Fred K. Keller	Clifford Fagin	September 24, 1989
Ted thinks one of the guests is a murderer in the mob.
12	12	"Employee of the Week"	Ross K. Bagwell Jr.	Alan Goodman	October 1, 1989
The staff competes to win Mr. Ernst's "Employee of the Week" contest.
13	13	"Pain in the Neck"	Ross K. Bagwell Jr.	Judy Spencer	October 8, 1989
Mr. Ernst decides it's time for some spring cleaning at the ranch. While Ted and Danny are fixing things, Danny falls off the ladder and injures his neck.

=== Season 2 (1989–1990) ===
No. overall	No. in season	Title	Directed by	Written by	Original release date
14	1	"Loose Lips"	Ross K. Bagwell Jr.	Michael B. Kaplan	October 15, 1989
Melody gives away a big secret of Brad's to Ted. This leads to everyone giving away everyone else's secrets to get revenge.
15	2	"Battle of a Hundred Bucks"	Fred K. Keller	Michael B. Kaplan	October 22, 1989
The kids compete to see who's worthy of a $100 tip left by a guest.
16	3	"Our Little Champion"	Ross K. Bagwell Jr.	Judy Spencer	October 29, 1989
Melody decides to start training for the Olympics for swimming. Of course, Mr. Ernst sees a way to make money off this, and begins to exploit Melody to benefit the ranch.
17	4	"Bunkmate Battles"	Fred K. Keller	Alan Goodman	November 5, 1989
While Danny bets Ted that he can't go a week without using Native American items, Brad moves out of the girls bunk and into the lodge after a fight with Melody.
18	5	"Crash Landing"	Ross K. Bagwell Jr.	Graham Yost	November 12, 1989
Ted, Buddy, and Mr. Ernst witness a small Cessna plane crash near the ranch. When they go to find the pilot, they get a little more than they bargained for.
19	6	"Ghost Stories"	Fred K. Keller	Graham Yost	November 19, 1989
The kids tell ghost stories in attempt to frighten each other. Then Ted challenges the other kids to scare him.
20	7	"Teacher's Pest"	Ross K. Bagwell Jr.	Clifford Fagin	December 3, 1989
Ted's English teacher visits the Bar None and falls for Mr. Ernst. Buddy and Ted plot to get them apart. Brad has to decide whether to stay at the ranch or join her parents in France.
21	8	"Treasure Teens"	Fred K. Keller	Alan Goodman	December 10, 1989
Ted finds a treasure map, and causes a stir on the ranch when the staff tries to find it.
22	9	"Dan the Man"	Ross K. Bagwell Jr.	Lisa Melamed	December 17, 1989
Danny feels responsible for the near-death of a horse. Mr. Ernst tries to stay on his diet.
23	10	"Superstar"	Fred K. Keller	Clifford Fagin	January 6, 1990
Melody falls head over heels for her favorite TV heartthrob who's visiting the ranch.
24	11	"Bar None Babysitter"	Ross K. Bagwell Jr.	Judy Spencer	January 13, 1990
It's a nightmare come true when Ted loses the child he is baby-sitting. Mr. Ernst appoints Danny the answer man.
25	12	"Cowboy Ernst"	Fred K. Keller	Dean Young	January 20, 1990
The kids find out Mr. Ernst is going to sell the ranch. So the kids set out to make Mr. E think he is a real cowboy.
26	13	"Take Me to Your Leader"	Ross K. Bagwell Jr.	David A. Litteral	January 27, 1990
Buddy thinks he saw an alien while walking the ranch property, but nobody believes him.

=== Season 3 (1990) ===
No. overall	No. in season	Title	Directed by	Written by	Original release date
27	1	"Inmates Run the Asylum"	Ross K. Bagwell Jr.	Graham Yost	April 7, 1990
Senior staffer Ted is put in charge of the ranch and has a power trip when Mr. Ernst is out of town.
28	2	"Hey Cinderella"	Ross K. Bagwell Jr.	Judy Spencer	April 14, 1990
Mr. Ernst wants to impress some important (rich) guests who are coming to the ranch. Melody gets a crush on one of the guests, and pretends to be rich in order to impress him.
29	3	"Datenite"	Fred K. Keller	Clifford Fagin	April 21, 1990
Ted convinces Brad to go on a date with him before he leaves the ranch to attend summer school.
30	4	"New Kid on the Block"	Fred K. Keller	Steve Roth & Deanne Roth	April 28, 1990
Jake, Mr. Ernst's trouble making nephew, comes to stay at the Bar None.
31	5	"Sewn at the Hip"	Ross K. Bagwell Jr.	Lisa Melamed	May 5, 1990
When an old friend of Melody's comes to visit, Melody finds that nothing ever stays the same.
32	6	"Superstition"	Fred K. Keller	Graham Yost	May 12, 1990
Jake's superstitious nature prevents him from trying out for a TV game show.
33	7	"Dueling Ranches"	Ross K. Bagwell Jr.	Mark Cerulli	May 19, 1990
The owner of the Snake Eyes Ranch challenges Mr. Ernst and the Bar None to a baseball game.
34	8	"Ex-Static"	Fred K. Keller	Lisa Melamed	May 26, 1990
Buddy's mom Sara comes to take him back home to New York after he calls her and tells her how bored he's been. While Sara is there Buddy tries to get her and his dad back together.
35	9	"No More Mr. Nice Guy"	Fred K. Keller	Judy Spencer	June 2, 1990
When she starts feeling as if everyone takes advantage of her kind, friendly demeanor, Melody decides to go on strike. Buddy tries to hypnotize Jake, but it doesn't go according to plan.
36	10	"Killer Ernst"	Ross K. Bagwell Jr.	Mark Cerulli	June 9, 1990
Mr. Ernst puts on a professional wrestling match at the Bar None, but when one of the wrestler's doesn't show Mr. E takes his place.
37	11	"Melody's Brother"	Fred K. Keller	Judy Spencer	June 16, 1990
Melody helps her brother with a drinking problem.
38	12	"The Bad Seed"	Fred K. Keller	Graham Yost	June 23, 1990
Buddy is put in charge of a troublemaking guest at the ranch who frames him for her misdeeds. Mr. Ernst teaches the staff that the customer is always right.
39	13	"Stick Around"	Fred K. Keller	Lisa Melamed	June 30, 1990
After meeting Brad, Kyle decides to stay at the Bar None for the first time. Meanwhile, Lucy is thinking about getting married.

=== Season 4 (1990) ===
No. overall	No. in season	Title	Directed by	Written by	Original release date
40	1	"They're Back"	Ross K. Bagwell Jr.	Mark Cerulli	September 8, 1990
The Vlecks stay at the Bar None while the Snake Eyes Ranch is being repaired.
41	2	"Ride, She Said"	Fred K. Keller	Clifford Fagin	September 15, 1990
Brad learns the true meaning of Christmas from her friendship with a disabled boy.
42	3	"Magnum Ernst"	Fred K. Keller	Clifford Fagin	September 22, 1990
Mr. Ernst poses himself as a sheriff, and Danny and Buddy work on the first living-desert museum.
43	4	"Dudesbury"	Fred K. Keller	Lisa Melamed	September 29, 1990
Danny becomes a cartoonist for the local paper.
44	5	"Fear"	Ross K. Bagwell Jr.	Graham Yost	October 5, 1990
The pool at the Bar None will close unless the staff becomes certified. The problem is Brad is afraid of the water.
45	6	"Secret Admirer"	Ross K. Bagwell Jr.	Patrick Maguire	October 12, 1990
Brad and Mel try to cheer up Mr. Ernst when he is down about getting older.
46	7	"Lost in the Desert"	Ross K. Bagwell Jr.	Judy Spencer	October 19, 1990
Brad and Kyle are tied up and left in the desert during a camping trip with young buckaroos.
47	8	"Return of Ted"	Ross K. Bagwell Jr.	Graham Yost	October 26, 1990
Ted runs away from summer school and returns to the ranch. Mr. E tries to win $10,000 on "Hilarious Home Videos". (This is David Lascher's return appearance to the show)
48	9	"Do the Right Thing"	Fred K. Keller	Steve Roth & Deanne Roth	November 2, 1990
An archaeologist discovers a sacred Indian burial ground at the Bar None.
49	10	"Doghouse Blues"	Ross K. Bagwell Jr.	Mark Cerulli	November 9, 1990
The Vlecks have a fight causing Mrs. Vleck to flee to the Bar None and it is up to Jake to solve their problem.
50	11	"Some Like It Hot"	Fred K. Keller	Steve Roth & Deanne Roth	November 16, 1990
Danny and Jake's impersonations of visiting travel writers fool Mr. Ernst.
51	12	"Mr. Moneybags"	Ross K. Bagwell Jr.	Graham Yost	December 7, 1990
Because of financial difficulties, Mr. Ernst considers selling the Bar None. Ted returns with good news. Foreigners visit the Bar None.
52	13	"Murder, He Wrote"	Fred K. Keller	Patrick Maguire	December 14, 1990
Mr. Ernst and the staff plan a murder-mystery night to raise money for the ranch. Ted and Melody are away sick and when they return to the ranch they think the kids are planning a real murder.

=== Season 5 (1991) ===
No. overall	No. in season	Title	Directed by	Written by	Original release date
53	1	"Miss Tucson"	Fred K. Keller	Lisa Melamed	June 7, 1991
Melody becomes obsessed with winning a beauty pageant.
54	2	"The Legend of Jed"	Ross K. Bagwell Jr.	Paul Budra	June 14, 1991
To keep Jake from being fired, the staff invents an imaginary worker to blame for his mistakes.
55	3	"Incredible Shrinking Ted"	Ross K. Bagwell Jr.	Patrick Maguire	June 21, 1991
The staff plays a joke on Ted by making him think he is shrinking.
56	4	"Rest in Pieces"	Ross K. Bagwell Jr.	Laura Innes & David Brisbin	June 28, 1991
The kids, under the misconception that Mr. Ernst is dying, try to keep him awake. The kids bet Melody that she go a whole day without being nice.
57	5	"Baby"	Fred K. Keller	Clifford Fagin	July 5, 1991
The kids try to take care of a baby left behind at the ranch until the mother returns.
58	6	"Jealous Guy"	Ross K. Bagwell Jr.	Graham Yost	July 12, 1991
Ted and Kyle must rely on each other to escape the danger of the desert.
59	7	"Amnesia"	Fred K. Keller	Paul Budra	July 19, 1991
Mr. Ernst develops amnesia and thinks he is a 17-year-old kid again just as the juvenile work inspector shows up.
60	8	"Presumed Stupid"	Ross K. Bagwell Jr.	Judy Spencer	July 26, 1991
When Brad's birthday money goes missing it looks like Ted is the prime suspect.
61	9	"Crush"	Fred K. Keller	Lisa Melamed	August 2, 1991
Buddy falls in love with Melody. Brad and Ted try to go the longest without caring about their appearance.
62	10	"Low Budget Brad"	Ross K. Bagwell Jr.	Story by : Grant Dobbins; Teleplay by : Lisa Melamed	August 9, 1991
Brad's father loses his job and she is forced to sell some of her items.
63	11	"Jake's Fight"	Ross K. Bagwell Jr.	Judy Spencer	August 16, 1991
A guest threatens to beat up Jake.
64	12	"Double Date"	Fred K. Keller	Stephen Land	August 23, 1991
Ted asks Melody out to make Brad jealous.
65	13	"War"	Fred K. Keller	Graham Yost	August 30, 1991
It's the new kids vs. the veterans in a game of capture the flag.

== Home media ==
The first season of Hey Dude became available for download from the iTunes Store on July 29, 2008. The second season of Hey Dude became available for download from the iTunes Store in August 2010. The third season of Hey Dude became available for download from the iTunes Store on November 29, 2011 (only containing 12 out of 13 episodes). All five seasons of the series are available for purchase as DVD or streaming episodes through Amazon.com.

On April 11, 2011, it was announced that Shout! Factory had acquired the rights to the series. They subsequently released the entire series on DVD in Region 1. The fourth season was released on DVD as a Shout Select title, available exclusively through Shout Factory's website and select Amazon.com sellers. The fifth and final season was released on July 16, 2013, also as a Shout Select title.

On March 10, 2015, Shout! released Hey Dude: The Complete Series on DVD as a Walmart exclusive in full screen format. It is also available through Amazon.com.

On May 9, 2017, the complete series was re-released as a general retail release.

On March 24, 2021, the series (with the exception of "They're Back" from Season 4) was added to Paramount+.

DVD name	Ep #	Release date
Season 1	13	July 19, 2011
Season 2	13	January 31, 2012
Season 3	13	June 19, 2012
Season 4	13	April 9, 2013♦
Season 5	13	July 16, 2013♦
Complete Series	65	March 10, 2015; May 9, 2017 (re-release)

♦—Shout! Factory Exclusives title, sold exclusively through Shout's online store
