= Welcome Freshmen =

American comedy television series

- Also known as: School Students
- Genre: Comedy
- Created by: Robert Mittenthal
- Directed by: Scott Fishman; Tim Hill; Adam Weissman; Michael Berry; Ron Smith; Bob Lampel; Helen Smith
- Starring: Rick Galloway; Chris Lobban; David Rhoden (1991–92); Jill Setter (1991–92); Jocelyn Steiner; Mike Speller; Arian Ash (1992–93); Brock Bradley (1992–93); Nicholas Caruso (1992–93)
- Theme music composer: Peter Lauer
- Country of origin: United States
- Original language: English
- No. of seasons: 4
- No. of episodes: 52

Production
- Producers: Woody Fraser; Angelika Bartenbach-Kidd; Lisa Tauger; Maureen Badger Schultz
- Production locations: Nickelodeon Studios, Universal Studios; Orlando, Florida
- Running time: 30 minutes

Original release
- Network: Nickelodeon
- Release: February 16, 1991 – February 19, 1994

Welcome Freshmen is an American comedy series that aired on Nickelodeon from February 16, 1991, to February 19, 1994, with repeats until October 27, 1996. The show took place at Hawthorne High School with a group of high school students and a bumbling vice principal.

== Seasons 1 and 2 ==
The earlier episodes of the series consisted of comedy sketches that loosely followed a theme, each episode had two or three short skits about the gang's misadventures in high school. Some of the comedy routines involved a tortoise named Mortise teaching children about safety, a historian named Mr. History who talks about past generations of freshmen, the bumbling, freshman-hating, vice-principal Mr. Lippman imagining himself as a stand-up comedian telling really bad old jokes that insult freshmen, and a student named Billy Cushman who, though his appearance was occasional, provided not only a good example of how not to behave but also a good example of flatulence.

=== Recurring skits ===
- Home-Room Announcements – Mr. Lippman, the vice-principal, doing the morning announcements (at the same time, imagining how he'd really like to say them as a stand-up format).
- The Merv-U-Mentary – Merv's amateurish attempt at uncovering news and scandals at the high school.
- Coach Roach/Rochelle - In gym class, Coach Roach drives the boys in military-like fashion. (or likewise, his sister Coach Rochelle does the same to the girls.) One of the kids would suggest to the coach that they would like to do something else. The coach agrees before adding "Only we'll do it the Coach Roach/Rochelle way!" which doesn't end up well for the kids.
- Mr. History – featuring the gang as high school students of a past time period.
- Mike Who – featuring close-ups of a sidelined high school basketball player driving the crowd wild with a single wave. Eventually cut after vice Principal Lippman said it was too distracting, resulting in a tense showdown between Lippman and Who.
- Mortise the Safety Tortoise – a tortoise who teaches children about safety.

== Seasons 3 and 4 ==
In the later episodes, the sketch comedy format was abandoned, and the show became a standard sitcom.

In the third season, Kevin and Alex become sophomores, and Walter is held behind due to missing summer school. Merv and Tara leave Hawthorne, with Merv skipping the rest of high school and going straight to college, and Tara moving to a biosphere with her family. New characters came in: Grant, Erin and Manny, by the end of the third season, Manny left. In the series finale, Walter becomes a sophomore after all the teachers threatened to quit if they had him for another year.

== Production ==
The show's first television pilot was filmed in May 1990, featuring a group of local actors in the main roles, among them was future Backstreet Boys member Howie Dorough. After the success of the pilot, the show was picked up, but the roles were recast, according to series creator Bob Mittenthal "Those kids did a good job, the proof is that the show was picked up as a series, but research told Nickelodeon it needed better-defined characters".

According to Jocelyn Steiner, several actresses had auditioned for the role of Alex before she got cast, including Brittany Daniel who was a final contender for the role.

== Cast ==
- Rick Galloway as Walter Patterson
- Chris Lobban as Kevin St. James
- David Rhoden as Merv (1991–1992)
- Jill Setter as Tara (1991–1992)
- Jocelyn Steiner as Alex Moore
- Brock Bradley as Grant Kelly (1993–1994)
- Arian Waring Ash as Erin Kelly (1993–1994)
- Nicholas Caruso as Manny Barrington (1993)
- Mike Speller as Mr. Elliott Lippman
- Veronica Alicino as Miss Topaz
- Janis Benson as Miss Petruka
- Nick Barnes as Billy Cushman
- Phil Card as Mr. History
- Tracy Frenkel as Coach Roach and Coach Rochelle
- Jay Martel as Mr. Royd
- Al Arasim as Al Patterson
- John Parker Searles as Mr. Macbroom
- Mark Sarto as Mortise, the Safety Tortoise

== Characters ==
=== Main ===
- Walter Patterson (Rick Galloway) is the dimwitted, good-natured, optimistic, lazy laid-back, and geeky slacker of the group who loves eating. His stupidity and clumsiness are often the butt of jokes. In the series finale, he is able to graduate from high school as his teachers told Mr. Lippman they would quit if he was held back another year.
- Kevin St. James (Chris Lobban) is the cynical, selfish, and egotistical one of the group. He is a smooth talker, a terrible ladies' man, and often makes fun of his friends. Mostly, he is troublemaker of the group.
- Merv (David Rhoden) is the confident, outgoing nerd of the group. He was written out of the show after season two, where it was explained that he graduated early and enrolled in college.
- Tara (Jill Setter) is the eco-conscious feminist activist of the group. Besides Walter, she is among the nicest of the group though she joins in making fun of others at times. She was written out of the show after season two, where it was explained that she and her parents moved into a biosphere community.
- Alex Moore (Jocelyn Steiner) is a beautiful, popular and fashion-obsessed girly girl. Often vain, snobby, rude, and materialistic, she is obsessed with her status and has no issues manipulating others for personal gain.
- Mr. Elliott Lippman (Mike Speller) is the tyrannical and incompetent principal of Hawthorne High. He often serves as an antagonist to the main characters' schemes though they do not take him seriously. In spite of his personality, he is known to have a soft spot and willing to help his students out if they are in trouble.

=== Additional ===
- Miss Petruka (Janis Benson) - Mr. Lippman's secretary who always sticks up for him, but she is known to call him out on a few things.
- Billy Cushman (Nick Barnes) - A troublemaking student who also has a bad case of flatulence. Only appeared in seasons one and two.
- Mr. History (Phil Card) - An old-school narrator who shows viewers what freshmen looked like in various time periods. Only appeared in seasons one and two.
- Coach Roach and Coach Rochelle (Tracy Frenkel) - Stereotypical coaches who are constantly hard on their students. In a season two episode, he puts a stop to an altercation between Walter and Tara's dads by making them settle their differences in a sack race. Only appeared in seasons one and two.
- Mr. Royd' (Jay Martel) - A volatile guidance counselor who tries to be supportive to students, but often lashes out in tangents about his failures in life. Only appeared in seasons one and two.
- Al Patterson (Al Arasim) - Walter's widowed father who is portrayed as a dumb, slobbish person, but generally has a good heart and a close relationship with his son.
- Mr. MacBroom (John Parker Searles) - The slow-witted school janitor who speaks with a heavy Scottish accent.
- Grant Kelly (Brock Bradley) is introduced in the third season as a new student and as potential love interest to Alex.
- Erin Kelly (Arian Waring Ash) is Grant's younger sister who often dresses in grunge fashion, but she is known to be an excellent student and helpful to others around her.
- Manny Barrington - A naive and short-statured nerdy freshman introduced in the third season. He befriends the main group who are a grade above him despite them treating him poorly and laughing at his expense. He only appeared in half of the season, despite being credited in all episodes.

== Series overview ==
Season	Episodes	Originally released		Time slot
Season	Episodes	First released	Last released	Time slot
1	13	February 16, 1991	May 11, 1991	Sundays, 6:30 p.m.
2	13	May 9, 1992	August 1, 1992	Saturdays, 6:30 p.m.
3	14	January 2, 1993	July 31, 1993	Saturdays, 5:00 p.m.
4	12	December 5, 1993	February 19, 1994	Sundays, 1:30 p.m.

== Episodes ==
=== Season 1 (1991) ===
No. overall	No. in season	Title	Directed by	Written by	Original release date
1	1	"Express Yourself"	Scott Fishman	Robert Mittenthal & Tim Hill	February 16, 1991
2	2	"Extra-Curricular Activities"	Scott Fishman	Robert Mittenthal & Tim Hill	February 23, 1991
3	3	"Mind Games"	Scott Fishman	Robert Mittenthal & Tim Hill	March 2, 1991
4	4	"Knowledge is Power"	Scott Fishman	Robert Mittenthal & Tim Hill	March 9, 1991
5	5	"Growing Up"	Scott Fishman	Robert Mittenthal & Tim Hill	March 16, 1991
6	6	"Technology"	Scott Fishman	Robert Mittenthal & Tim Hill	March 23, 1991
7	7	"Money"	Scott Fishman	Robert Mittenthal & Tim Hill	March 30, 1991
8	8	"Authority"	Scott Fishman	Robert Mittenthal & Tim Hill	April 6, 1991
9	9	"How We Look"	Scott Fishman	Robert Mittenthal & Tim Hill	April 13, 1991
10	10	"Careers in the Making"	Scott Fishman	Robert Mittenthal & Tim Hill	April 20, 1991
11	11	"Language"	Scott Fishman	Robert Mittenthal & Tim Hill	April 27, 1991
12	12	"What We Eat"	Scott Fishman	Robert Mittenthal & Tim Hill	May 4, 1991
13	13	"Getting Even"	Scott Fishman	Robert Mittenthal & Tim Hill	May 11, 1991

=== Season 2 (1992) ===
No. overall	No. in season	Title	Directed by	Written by	Original release date
14	1	"Friends"	Tim Hill	Robert Mittenthal & Tim Hill	May 9, 1992
15	2	"Conformity"	Tim Hill	Robert Mittenthal & Tim Hill	May 16, 1992
16	3	"Choices"	Tim Hill	Robert Mittenthal & Tim Hill	May 23, 1992
17	4	"Bullies"	Tim Hill	Robert Mittenthal & Tim Hill	May 30, 1992
18	5	"The Grass is Always Greener"	Tim Hill	Robert Mittenthal & Tim Hill	June 6, 1992
19	6	"Holidays"	Tim Hill	Robert Mittenthal & Tim Hill	June 13, 1992
20	7	"Dating"	Tim Hill	Robert Mittenthal & Tim Hill	June 20, 1992
21	8	"Health"	Tim Hill	Robert Mittenthal & Tim Hill	June 27, 1992
22	9	"Ecology"	Tim Hill	Robert Mittenthal & Tim Hill	July 4, 1992
23	10	"Communication"	Tim Hill	Robert Mittenthal & Tim Hill	July 11, 1992
24	11	"Success"	Tim Hill	Robert Mittenthal & Tim Hill	July 18, 1992
25	12	"Competition"	Tim Hill	Robert Mittenthal & Tim Hill	July 25, 1992
26	13	"Secrets"	Tim Hill	Robert Mittenthal & Tim Hill	August 1, 1992

=== Season 3 (1993) ===
No. overall	No. in season	Title	Directed by	Written by	Original release date
27	1	"Things Change" "Held Back"	Michael Berry	Tim Hill	January 2, 1993
Walter, Kevin, and Alex endure a new year of school and meet new faces: Grant Kelly, Grant's younger sister Erin, and the nerdy Manny Barrington.
28	2	"The Harvest Ball" "Big Dance"	Michael Berry	Gena Van Winkle	January 9, 1993
The kids all look forward to the upcoming Harvest Ball.
29	3	"To Walter's Dad with Love"	Michael Berry	Michael Rubiner	January 16, 1993
Lippman hires Walter's dad as a history teacher, Erin deals with other students calling her names.
30	4	"The People vs. Walter"	Ron Smith	Rob Dinsmoor	January 23, 1993
When a school portrait of Lippman is vandalized, the blame is on Walter and is put on trial in student court, with Erin as presiding judge and Manny as Walter's counsel, but when Manny's lawyer skills leave a lot to be desired, he is appointed to judge and Erin as counsel, who is determined to prove Walter's innocence. After several witnesses are questioned, the culprit turns out to be Mr. Wright, who wanted revenge against Lippman after being denied a promotion and Manny is forced by Erin to dismiss the case.
31	5	"Othello the (Sopho)moor"	Ron Smith	Anne Bernstein	January 30, 1993
Lippman is Iago in the school's "Othello".
32	6	"Shiny Top"	Bob Lampel	David Potorti	February 6, 1993
Lippman is taken for archcriminal Shiny Top.
33	7	"I'm Dead"	Ron Smith	Clifford Fagin	February 13, 1993
A senior wants to beat up Walter, while Lippman fends off a committee wanting to take control of the school's discipline issues.
34	8	"Manny in Love"	Bob Lampel	Veronica Alicino	February 20, 1993
Manny has a crush on his baby sitter.
35	9	"Requiem for a Lightweight"	Bob Lampel	Alan Levy	February 27, 1993
Erin wants to wrestle; Lippman breaks a chain letter.
36	10	"The Lippdromeda Strain"	Adam Weissman	Howard Nemetz, Simon Rakoff, Tim Hill & Michael Rubiner	July 3, 1993
The kids are quarantined at school.
37	11	"Hawthorne Confidential"	Adam Weissman	Rob Dinsmoor	July 10, 1993
Alex uses gossip in a journalism class documentary.
38	12	"Erin for Office"	Adam Weissman	Gena Van Winkle	July 17, 1993
Erin runs for student-body president.
39	13	"Looking for Mr. Goodwrench"	Unknown	Unknown	July 24, 1993
Walter crashes into Mr.Lippman's car.
40	14	"What Rhymes with Liar"	Helen Smith	Robert Leighton	July 31, 1993
Kevin says he knows a star (Shanice Wilson). Walter bungles his way through several mishaps while being's Lippman's office assistant.

=== Season 4 (1993-1994) ===
No. overall	No. in season	Title	Directed by	Written by	Original release date
41	1	"Math, Lies & Videotape"	Tim Hill	Michael Rubiner	1993
Erin helps Walter study; Kevin tries to cheat.
42	2	"Drawn and Quoted"	Tim Hill	Story by : Robert Leighton; Teleplay by : Rob Dinsmoor	1993
Walter is a cartoonist for the school paper.
43	3	"The Genius"	Tim Hill	Story by : Robert Leighton; Teleplay by : Anne Bernstein	1993
A child prodigy may attend Hawthorne.
44	4	"The Stuff"	Adam Weissman	Robert Leighton	1993
A science-class mishap results in a revolutionary glue.
45	5	"Marathon Woman"	Adam Weissman	Story by : Michael Rubiner & Jed Spingarn; Teleplay by : Jed Spingarn	1993
Kevin coaxes Samantha to be his dance-marathon partner.
46	6	"Reachin' for the Stars"	Adam Weissman	Story by : Veronica Alicino & Michael Rubiner; Teleplay by : Veronica Alicino	1993
Talent scouts come to Hawthorne High.
47	7	"The Courtship of Walter's Father"	Adam Weissman	Jay Martel	1993
His father falls for Walter's least-favorite teacher.
48	8	"Safety Last"	Adam Weissman	Tom Wargo	1993
Hawthorne must pass a safety inspection or close.
49	9	"Seeds of Destruction"	TBD	TBD	1993
Erin insults Mr. Lippman.
50	10	"Rainy Day Women"	TBD	TBD	1993
Walter and Kevin vie for a girl's attention.
51	11	"Getting What You Want"	Adam Weissman	Tim Hill	1993
Mr. Lippman's philosophy: karma by points.
52	12	"Year's End"	Adam Weissman	Tim Hill	1994
The gang make their plans for summer as the academic year draws to a close.
