= Nickelodeon Launch Box =

- Genre: Astronomy
- Directed by: Andy Bamberger
- Opening theme: "Raiders of Fortune" by Network Music
- Country of origin: United States
- Original language: English
- No. of seasons: 1
- No. of episodes: 9

Production
- Producer: Alexandra J. Bennett
- Running time: 25-27 minutes
- Production companies: Nickelodeon Productions; NASA; Astronauts Memorial Foundation

Original release
- Network: Nickelodeon
- Release: May 9, 1991 – March 11, 1994

Nickelodeon Launch Box is an educational television series that was produced jointly by Nickelodeon, NASA and the Astronauts Memorial Foundation. It was meant to teach kids about space travel technology. As part of the Cable in the Classroom service, the show was intended to be taped by teachers and shown in the classroom. Each episode also included a teacher's portion before and after where ideas for lessons and other aides were discussed. The show was taped before a live studio audience at Nickelodeon Studios and made use of many sets for Nickelodeon shows such as What Would You Do? and Double Dare.

The show aired on Nickelodeon from May 9, 1991, to March 11, 1994, and continued in reruns often in early morning time slots right after Nick at Nite had finished (usually as part of Cable in the Classroom) until September 1, 2000.

== Episodes ==
No.	Title	Original release date
1	The Spectacular Spacesuit	May 9, 1991
Astronaut Brad Prouty appears in a spacesuit and explains the way it works. Kids offer facts about the suit during a "Space Break." We review spacesuit fashions through the ages, look at spin-offs (firemen's suits) and answer kids' questions.
2	Living on the Space Shuttle	May 10, 1991
We explore everyday life aboard the Space Shuttle, including the food astronauts eat and the way they go to the bathroom. We also examine the effects of weightlessness.
3	Space Training	November 1, 1991
We visit Space Camp at the Kennedy Space Center in Florida and review the training needed to become an astronaut. Special guest-star former Senator Jake Garn talks about his mission aboard the Space Shuttle and answers questions about space travel.
4	The Living Earth	May 29, 1992
We look at the Earth from the outside and explain how satellites are used to study the planet. UCF adjunct professor Karen Musser demonstrates how to build a self-sustaining environment in a bio-bottle. We teach kids facts about the Earth by playing a game show.
5	Space Station	May 22, 1992
The United States is getting closer to creating a permanently crewed space station in orbit. Dick Lyon of NASA is the special guest. UCF adjunct professor Karen Musser hosts the teacher's portion of the program.
6	Fantastic Forces	June 18, 1992
Bob Sieck, the Launch Director of the Space Shuttle Program, is interviewed at the Kennedy Space Center. Coach Danny discusses Newton's Laws of Physics. Robin Marrella from Nickelodeon's Double Dare hosts the student's portion and UCF adjunct professor Karen Musser hosts the teacher's portion of the program.
7	The Inner Planets	March 11, 1994
Prepare yourselves for an epic voyage to explore the depths of space...to travel with the intrepid crew of the U.S.S. StarGrazer who have been sent on a mission to explore Mercury, Venus, Earth, Mars and the Moon. Students don't have to leave their classroom to catch some incredible sights: from a giant volcano taller than Mount Everest, to a planet that rotates backwards, to craters as big as Texas. Jason Zimbler of Clarissa Explains it All fame, will take viewers on an incredible adventure to explore the inner planets in this episode of Launch Box.
8	The Outer Planets	November 26, 1993
This episode of Launch Box takes kids on an incredible journey to the five farthest planets from the sun: Jupiter, Saturn, Uranus, Neptune and Pluto. These planets and their moons were visited by NASA's Voyager 1 and Voyager 2 and what they found were sights never seen before -- giant hurricanes bigger than Earth, a moon with active volcanoes and a whole planet tipped on its side -- all in the Solar System. Astronaut Mike McCulley, the pilot on Space Shuttle Mission STS-34, hosts the informative teacher's portion. From the fast-paced, high energy of host Phil Moore to the challenging space games, you will not want to miss this Launch Box.
9	Flight	February 4, 1994
Have you or your students ever wondered how a plane that weighs several tons can fly as easily as a bird? Or how a plane can fly through a lightning storm, wind shear or a snowstorm and come out of it virtually untouched? In addition, what is on tap for the future of flight?
