= 2010 Kids' Choice Awards =

Children's television awards show program broadcast in 2010

- Date: March 27, 2010
- Location: Pauley Pavilion; Los Angeles, California
- Hosted by: Kevin James
- Preshow hosts: Lily Collins; Jeff Sutphen

Highlights
- Most awards: Taylor Swift (2)
- Most nominations: Monsters vs. Aliens (3); The Suite Life on Deck (3)

Television/radio coverage
- Network: Nickelodeon
- Runtime: 90 minutes (8–9:30 p.m. ET/PT)
- Viewership: 7.64 million
- Produced by: Paul Flattery
- Directed by: Beth McCarthy-Miller

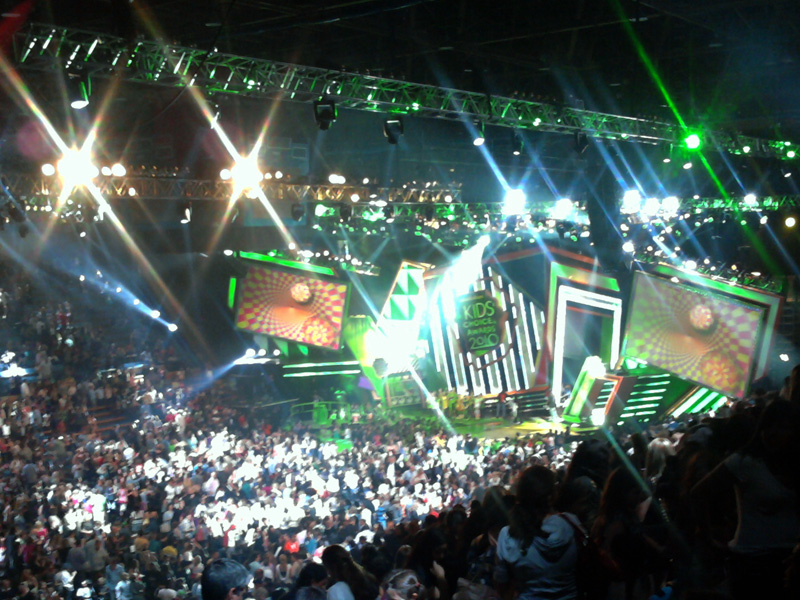
The final slime at the 2010 Kids' Choice Awards

The 23rd Annual Nickelodeon Kids' Choice Awards was held on March 27, 2010, on the Nell and John Wooden Court of Pauley Pavilion, on the campus of UCLA in Los Angeles, California with Kevin James as host. With the launch of Nickelodeon Canada in late 2009, Canada broadcast the awards live as it aired in the Eastern, Central, and Mountain time zones of the United States (it was tape-delayed for the Pacific Time Zone) and the awards was rebroadcast on YTV on April 2, 2010, at 7 p.m. ET. As a result, Canadian kids were able to vote on candidates for the first time. Nickelodeon's sister channels TeenNick and Nicktoons suspended regular programming during the 90-minute duration of the award show to allow viewers to see the awards.

The awards show featured the orange carpet, the celebrities, the fun, the slime, and the orange blimp awards (some featuring the new Nickelodeon logo that debuted on September 28, 2009). Votes were cast on Nickelodeon's websites on the 19 categories this year (including one new category) from February 25, 2010, to March 27, 2010, at 7:30 p.m. ET. More than 91.1 million votes were cast by kids for the 2009 award show. For the 2010 awards, more than 115 million votes were cast. This was the last year the awards were held at Pauley Pavilion for some time, due to renovations that began in 2010 and continued until the fall of 2012.

The Non-Stop Kids' Choice Weekend, a two-day-long look at preparations for the 2010 KCAs and included an inside look at the new series Victorious, whose pilot aired as a "sneak preview" episode immediately after the awards telecast (two weeks before it began airing as a regular weekly series), ran during regular Nickelodeon daytime programming as wraparound segments hosted live by BrainSurge host Jeff Sutphen on March 26, 2010, with taped segments hosted by Big Time Rush stars Kendall Schmidt, James Maslow, Carlos Pena, Jr., and Logan Henderson aired on March 27, 2010. The Countdown to Kids' Choice! pre-show telecast was hosted by Sutphen and Lily Collins and aired live from 6 to 8 p.m. ET, also aired as wraparound segments during scheduled programming, and included Miranda Cosgrove performing her new single "Kissin U". True Jackson, VP cast members Ashley Argota and Matt Shively hosted a webcast portion of Countdown to Kids' Choice! at 7:00 p.m. ET on Nick.com.

13-year-old Megan Call of Guilford, Connecticut, was the winner of the "All Access Sweepstakes with Justin Bieber" contest from the 500,000 entries. Call met Bieber, attended his pre-show rehearsal, walked with him down the orange carpet and attended the awards show in Los Angeles.

== Presenters and performers, and stunts ==
=== Host ===
- Kevin James

=== Presenters ===
The list of presenters and performers for the ceremony were announced on March 24, 2010.

- Tyra Banks
- Big Time Rush
- John Cena
- Jackie Chan
- Lily Collins
- Miranda Cosgrove
- Rosario Dawson
- Robert Downey Jr.
- Lucas Cruikshank
- Jonah Hill
- Victoria Justice
- Nathan Kress
- George Lopez
- Jennette McCurdy
- Lea Michele
- Cory Monteith
- Keke Palmer
- Dev Patel
- Katy Perry
- Chris Rock
- Zoe Saldaña
- Jaden Smith
- David Spade
- Shaun White

Note: In addition, promos aired prior to the telecast also announced that Queen Latifah was supposed to be a presenter at the awards, but she did not appear. Also, though Jerry Trainor, Victoria Justice, Nathan Kress, Jennette McCurdy, David Spade, Dev Patel, and Lucas Cruikshank did appear on the telecast as presenters, their appearances were not advertised in award show promos prior to the telecast.

=== Musical performers ===
The performers for the ceremony were announced on February 24, 2010.

- Miranda Cosgrove - "Kissin U" (Pre-show)
- Rihanna - "Hard"/"Rude Boy"/"Don't Stop the Music" (Main program)
- Justin Bieber- "Baby" (Main program)

=== Announcer ===
- Tom Kenny

=== Slime stunts ===
- Apolo Anton Ohno – catapulted into slime by a "slime slingshot"

=== Special guest appearance ===
- Adam Sandler
- Jerry Trainor
- Jackson Rathbone
- Nicola Peltz
- Steve Carell
- Tina Fey

=== Nicktoon appearances ===
- Poof and Foop of The Fairly OddParents
- Fanboy & Chum Chum
- The Penguins of Madagascar

== Winners and nominees ==
Winners are listed first, in bold. Other nominees are in alphabetical order.

=== Movies ===
Favorite Movie	Favorite Movie Actor
**Alvin and the Chipmunks: The Squeakquel**; Transformers: Revenge of the Fallen; The Twilight Saga: New Moon; X-Men Origins: Wolverine	**Taylor Lautner** – The Twilight Saga: New Moon as Jacob Black; Zac Efron – 17 Again as Michael "Mike" O'Donnell; Shia LaBeouf – Transformers: Revenge of the Fallen as Sam Witwicky; Tyler Perry – Madea Goes to Jail as Mabel "Madea" Simmons, Uncle Joe Simmons and Brian Simmons
Favorite Movie Actress	Favorite Animated Movie
**Miley Cyrus** – Hannah Montana: The Movie as Miley Stewart / Hannah Montana; Sandra Bullock – The Blind Side as Leigh Anne Tuohy; Megan Fox – Transformers: Revenge of the Fallen as Mikaela Banes; Zoe Saldaña – Avatar as Neytiri	**Up**; A Christmas Carol; Ice Age: Dawn of the Dinosaurs; Monsters vs. Aliens
Favorite Voice From an Animated Movie
**Jim Carrey** – A Christmas Carol as Ebenezer Scrooge, The Ghost of Christmas Past, The Ghost of Christmas Present and The Ghost of Christmas Future; Seth Rogen – Monsters vs. Aliens as B.O.B.; Ray Romano – Ice Age: Dawn of the Dinosaurs as Manny; Reese Witherspoon – Monsters vs. Aliens as Susan Murphy / Ginormica

=== Television ===
Favorite TV Show	Favorite TV Actor
**iCarly**; Sonny with a Chance; The Suite Life on Deck; Wizards of Waverly Place	**Dylan Sprouse** – The Suite Life on Deck as Zack Martin; Joe Jonas – Jonas as Joseph "Joe" Lucas; Nick Jonas – Jonas as Nicholas "Nick" Lucas; Cole Sprouse – The Suite Life on Deck as Cody Martin
Favorite TV Actress	Favorite Reality Show
**Selena Gomez** – Wizards of Waverly Place as Alex Russo; Miranda Cosgrove – iCarly as Carly Shay; Miley Cyrus – Hannah Montana as Miley Stewart / Hannah Montana; Keke Palmer – True Jackson, VP as True Jackson	**American Idol**; Are You Smarter than a 5th Grader?; So You Think You Can Dance; Wipeout
Favorite Cartoon
**SpongeBob SquarePants**; The Penguins of Madagascar; Phineas and Ferb; The Simpsons

=== Music ===
Favorite Music Group	Favorite Male Singer
**Black Eyed Peas**; Coldplay; Jonas Brothers; Linkin Park	**Jay-Z**; Sean Kingston; Mario; Ne-Yo
Favorite Female Singer	Favorite Song
**Taylor Swift**; Beyoncé; Miley Cyrus; Lady Gaga	**"You Belong with Me"** – Taylor Swift; "I Gotta Feeling" – The Black Eyed Peas; "Paparazzi" – Lady Gaga; "Party in the U.S.A." – Miley Cyrus

=== Sports ===
Favorite Male Athlete	Favorite Female Athlete
**Ryan Sheckler**; Kobe Bryant; LeBron James; Shaun White	**Misty May-Treanor**; Danica Patrick; Serena Williams; Venus Williams

=== Miscellaneous ===
Favorite Video Game	Favorite Book
**Mario Kart Wii**; The Legend of Zelda: Spirit Tracks; Wii Fit; Wii Sports Resort	**Diary of a Wimpy Kid**; Twilight Series; The Vampire Diaries; Where the Sidewalk Ends
Cutest Couple
**Taylor Lautner and Kristen Stewart** – The Twilight Saga: New Moon as Jacob Black and Bella Swan; Barack Obama and Michelle Obama; Robert Pattinson and Kristen Stewart – The Twilight Saga: New Moon as Edward Cullen and Bella Swan; Zoe Saldaña and Sam Worthington – Avatar as Neytiri and Jake Sully

== Events within the show ==
=== Kids' Choice Ultimate Dance Smackdown ===
The show also featured the "Kids' Choice Ultimate Dance Smackdown," hosted by iCarly co-stars Jennette McCurdy and Nathan Kress. It featured Nickelodeon live-action stars alongside characters from the Nicktoon series The Penguins of Madagascar, Fanboy & Chum Chum and The Fairly OddParents split amongst three teams with each team performing a different style of dance.

Robbie Amell from True Jackson, VP, Ariana Grande from Victorious, Gage Golightly from The Troop and The Penguins of Madagascar performed a Bollywood routine; Leon Thomas from Victorious, Nick Purcell from The Troop, Ashley Argota from True Jackson, VP and Poof and Foop of The Fairly OddParents performed a disco routine; and Matt Shively from True Jackson, VP, Noah Munck from iCarly and the title characters of Fanboy & Chum Chum performed a hip-hop routine.

Viewers could vote for the winner of the battle at Nick.com during the show. The hip-hop competitors, consisting of Munck, Shively and the title characters of Fanboy & Chum Chum, were voted winners of the battle.

=== Slime stunts ===
Two slime stunts were featured in the 2010 awards: the first involved gold-medalist Olympic speed skater Apolo Anton Ohno in a stunt in which he would be catapulted into slime by a "slime slingshot" in a "slime world record" attempt (the "launch" segment was actually pre-taped in advance of the show with Ohno's "catapulting" into the air digitally inserted); the second slime stunt involved actress Nicola Peltz, who co-stars in the then-upcoming feature film The Last Airbender making an attempt to bend slime (Peltz plays Katara, who has the ability to bend water.)

=== Mystery slimed celebrities ===
The Last Airbender co-star Jackson Rathbone, iCarly co-star Jerry Trainor, Katy Perry, online celebrity Fred Figglehorn (played by Lucas Cruikshank, who announced during commercial breaks the awards whose categories could not make it into the main show due to time constraints), Tina Fey, Steve Carell, and show host Kevin James were all slimed during the awards show.

Trainor and Rathbone were slimed during the slimebending stunt by a slime geyser (the podium where presenters and winners appear featured a pool of slime in front of the podium, directly surrounding it, thus also allowing those in the audience directly in front of that area of the stage to be slimed as well when the slime geyser is activated), Perry was slimed while introducing the "Favorite Movie Actress" award in which Miley Cyrus won (Perry was slimed while opening a box thought to contain a card announcing the winner; the force of the slime sprayed from the box caused Perry to lose balance and fall on the stage briefly), and Fey and Carell were also slimed by a slime geyser from the slime area directly surrounding the podium (though they appeared onstage, Fey and Carell did not introduce or present an award); Cruikshank (as his persona from his YouTube video series) slimed himself during one of the commercial break segments.

KCA host James, who was standing onstage with the children who handed out the awards to the winners appearing on the show, was slimed along with the children onstage near the end of the telecast after completing a running gag within the telecast in which James attempted to become a "beyond awesome" host by doing things to get in the audience's favor, with special guest Adam Sandler appearing on the videoscreens directly above the stage during the final sliming of the telecast.
