= Nick Studio 10 =

Programming block for Nickelodeon

- Network: Nickelodeon
- Launched: February 18, 2013
- Closed: June 17, 2013
- Country of origin: United States
- Running time: 120 minutes (including commercials)

Nick Studio 10 was a programming block on Nickelodeon which debuted on February 18, 2013, and ended on June 17, 2013, never returning from a planned hiatus after one additional 'best-of' Labor Day special on September 2, 2013. It aired weekday afternoons during the traditional school year from the network's headquarters building in Times Square in Manhattan, New York, and was presented live for viewers in the Eastern and Central time zones.

The program was hosted by four teen actors (Troy Doherty, Noah Grossman, Malika Samuel and Gabrielle Senn) who created random and surreal comedy skits and other content directed towards kids and teens. The program aired from 4:00 p.m. to 6:00 p.m. ET (tape delayed for the Pacific feed), and was the first live afternoon block for the network since the short-lived 2007 block ME: TV. Nick Studio 10 was an attempt to revive the network's tradition of live and hosted afternoon blocks, with previous entries including Nick in the Afternoon (1994 to 1998), Slime Time Live (2000 to 2004), and U-Pick Live (2002 to 2005).

The block started out as solely featuring multiple episodes of SpongeBob SquarePants (a series commonly marathoned by the channel), though two other series, The Fairly OddParents and Monsters vs. Aliens, were cycled into the schedule by the start of April. No new episodes of any series premiered during the block's entire run. The Nick Studio 10 continuity clips were inserted both naturally during program breaks, along with short clips taken from viral videos or other sources randomly within programming, which included non sequiturs such as "Nick Did It!" before returning to the scheduled programming in-progress. The in-show interruptions were quickly ended after a matter of weeks in response to negative viewer feedback.

== Airing history ==
On April 1, 2013, the segments relaunched after an Easter break of a few weeks, moving back an hour from a 5 p.m. start to 4 p.m., now with an hour of The Fairly OddParents followed by SpongeBob. Some episodes of Monsters vs. Aliens also aired in the block from April 29 on. The block ended in mid-June 2013 to make way for Nickelodeon's summer programming blocks and marathons.
