= Scanning the Movies =

Canadian educational television series

Scanning the Movies is a Canadian educational television series which debuted in September 1997, and takes a look at current films to understand and analyze films impact on pop culture. The show was created by host John Pungente for educators in media literacy. The show is produced by Bravo! Canada. Scanning the Movies is presented in classrooms as part of the Cable in the Classroom project.
