= 101 Ways to Leave a Gameshow =

British game show

- Genre: Comedy
- Directed by: Petrina Good
- Presented by: Steve Jones; Nemone
- Theme music composer: Marc Sylvan
- Country of origin: United Kingdom
- Original language: English
- No. of series: 1
- No. of episodes: 8

Production
- Executive producer: Andy Rowe
- Production locations: Buenos Aires, Argentina
- Running time: 60 minutes
- Production company: Initial

Original release
- Network: BBC One
- Release: 10 July – 28 August 2010

Related
- Total Wipeout

101 Ways to Leave a Gameshow is a British game show produced by Initial (a subsidiary of Endemol UK) for the BBC hosted by Steve Jones and Nemone. On each episode, eight contestants compete for a £10,000 prize by picking the correct answers to general knowledge questions, all the while standing on a tower configured for various stunts. Competitors who pick incorrect answers are eliminated from the show in a variety of different ways, usually involving a drop into a large pool of water at the base of the tower. The show made its debut on BBC One on 10 July 2010 and ended on 28 August 2010. An American version hosted by Jeff Sutphen premiered on ABC on 21 June 2011.

== Format ==
The show's production company, Endemol, describes the show as "the play-along fun of a glitzy, Saturday night quiz with the full-on adrenaline rush of an extreme stunt show." Each episode, features eight contestants, with a mix of sexes, ages and backgrounds, competing to be the winner of the £10,000 prize in the British version ($50,000 in the American version). Contestants are reduced one by one in the first four rounds, attempting to guess the correct answers to a selection of multiple-choice questions. The contestant who chooses the wrong answer will leave the show in spectacular fashion, in one of the 101 Ways to Leave a Gameshow. At any time during the first four rounds, a buzzer could sound, which announces the start of the Emergency Exit round. In this round, contestants are asked a series of questions at random, with the first contestant to give a wrong answer being eliminated. The Emergency Exit round is not used in either the American or Italian versions. In the final round, only three contestants remain (four contestants in the American version), who have to answer one last question in an attempt to win the jackpot prize.

== Production ==
The show was created jointly by Endemol USA and Endemol UK. It was first produced by the British division of Endemol for the BBC. Like its Saturday night stablemate, Total Wipeout, the show is filmed entirely at Endemol's filming facility in Benavídez, approximately 40 km Northwest of Buenos Aires, Argentina. Generally, most of the programme is recorded outside, however, studio segments are recorded in a monolithic purpose-built 100 feet (30 m) tall tower, located above the 'exits.' Studio segments are generally filmed on three different levels, with the '101 Ways to Leave' segments recorded on the Tower's exterior. Some exits from the show are recorded on a disused airfield runway located adjacent to the tower. Most of the exits culminate in the contestant ending up in a large pool of water directly in front of the tower. The United States version was filmed at Agua Dulce, California, which is a popular filming location in Northern Los Angeles County. The site has an active general aviation airfield that was closed down during filming. In January 2025, the remains of the tower were dismantled. It had been stood abandoned since 2012.

== Gameplay ==
In each of the first four rounds, Nemone reveals the exit method that will be used to dismiss the losing contestant, numbered between 1 and 101. Jones then asks a question and reads as many answers as there are contestants still in the game; all but one of them are correct. After each contestant secretly chooses one answer, all reveal their selections. If any answer is chosen by multiple contestants, a tiebreaker question on the buzzer is used to determine which one of them gets to keep it. After all ties have been resolved, the remaining contestants select again from the unchosen answers. Further toss-ups are played as needed until all contestants have chosen different answers, at which point they are prepared for the exit. Jones reveals one correct answer at a time until only two contestants are left in jeopardy, then announces the wrong answer. The contestant who chose it is immediately eliminated from the game. Once per episode, a buzzer sounds off between rounds to indicate that an "Emergency Exit" round must be played. Jones asks a question to one contestant at a time in random order and the first to miss a question is eliminated. Once three contestants remain, the fifth and final round begins, following the same format as the previous four except that the question has only one right answer. The contestant who chooses it wins £10,000, while the other two are dismissed by exit #101, "The Trap Door"—being dropped through trapdoors on which they are standing to fall into the water below.

== Exits used on the show ==
A total of 34 different exits were used over the course of the series, including #101 and the Emergency Exit that were common to all episodes. For all exits that involved going into the pool, rescue divers were present to assist contestants in reaching the surface if needed.

Exit number	Name	Episode number	Round number	Description
1	Balls of Doom	1	4	The contestants stand inside giant hamster balls made of steel tubing, at the top of a ramp that drops off into the pool. The contestant with the wrong answer is pushed down the ramp.
3	Punch Dunk	5	2	The contestants stand at the platform edge, with their backs to the pool. A boxer wearing oversized, padded gloves punches the contestant with the wrong answer in the midsection to knock them into the water.
4	Dunk and Disorderly	6	1	Tethered to bungee cords by their ankles, the contestants lie face-up on platforms balanced at the edge of the tower. The platform collapses under the one with the wrong answer, sending them headfirst into the pool.
7	Take the Plunge	7	1	Wearing harnesses attached to pulleys, the contestants lie on boards with their feet pointing out over the platform edge. The boards for the last two contestants tip forward to leave them dangling in midair, and the one with the wrong answer is dropped into the pool.
9	The Hang	5	1	The contestants lean against boards placed at a near-vertical angle on the edge of the platform, facing away from the edge. The platforms of the final two contestants tilt backwards, leaving them to dangle upside down for several seconds, and the one with the wrong answer is dropped into the pool.
12	Free Fall	1	1	Tethered to bungee cords, the contestants stand on boards with their backs to the platform's edge. The board under the contestant with the wrong answer collapses, plunging them into the pool.
15	Rubbish Dump	3	2	The contestants stand in wheeled rubbish bins at the top of a ramp that drops off into the pool. The one with the wrong answer is released to roll off the edge and into the water.
17	Saddle Sore	1	2	Similar to #15, but with the contestants sitting on bicycles.
19	Supermarket Smash	2	2	Similar to #15, but with the contestants sitting in trolleys.
22	Bang on Target	8	2	Wearing harnesses clipped to ropes, the contestants kneel on platforms at the edge of the tower. The one with the wrong answer is yanked upward to smash through a target painted on the ceiling above them.
23	Chopper Pull	8	4	The contestants wear harnesses tethered to the runners of a hovering helicopter. When the wrong answer is revealed, the helicopter gains altitude and tows that contestant away.
26	Human Wrecking Ball	4	2	The contestants stand with their backs to thin walls, wearing harnesses attached to lines that run through the walls. The contestant with the wrong answer is yanked backwards, smashing through their wall before being lowered into the water.
33	Evil Anvil	3	3	The contestants are tethered to anvils suspended over the pool. The anvil for the contestant with the wrong answer is released, pulling them into the water.
36	Rip Off	2	1	Wearing Velcro jumpsuits, the contestants lean against Velcro-covered boards that are suspended at a near-vertical angle above the pool. The contestant with the wrong answer is flipped forward off their board and into the water.
38	Scoot Chute	6	2	Similar to #15, but with the contestants sitting on scooters.
42	Glued to Your Seat	3	1	Tethered to bungee cords, the contestants sit in chairs suspended above the pool. The chair of the contestant with the wrong answer tips forward to drop them into the water.
46	Flipping Wreck	4	4	Each contestant is paired with a stunt driver in a row of cars parked side by side. Once the wrong answer is revealed, the driver of that contestant's car accelerates up a ramp designed to flip the car over, accompanied by a burst of flame.
51	Deadly Dangle	4	1	The contestants lie on their backs, on platforms balanced at the edge of the tower and are attached by their ankles to a 250-foot zip line. The platform collapses beneath the contestant with the wrong answer, leaving them to ride the line to the ground.
52	Concrete Boots	2	4	Concrete weights are suspended above the pool, and each contestant's ankles are strapped to one of them. The contestant with the wrong answer is dropped into the water with the weight and must free themselves to swim back up.
56	Human Fling	7	3	The contestants sit in chairs attached to catapults that are aimed out over the pool. The contestant with the wrong answer is hurled out of their seat and into the water.
61	Big, Giant, Colossal Hammers	1	3	The contestants stand at the platform edge facing the pool, with a giant inflatable hammer poised behind each of them. The hammer behind the one with the wrong answer swings forward to knock them into the water.
65	The Cracker	6	4	The contestants sit in cars that are balanced at the top of a ramp overlooking the pool. When the wrong answer is revealed, that contestant's car goes down the ramp and into the water.
69	The Big Zipper	8	1	Similar to #51, except that the contestants stand on their platforms and the eliminated one rides the zip line upright and facing backwards.
70	4-Wheel Dive	7	4	Contestants sit in cars at the bottom of ramps that face into the pool, with a cable attached to each front bumper. When the wrong answer is announced, that contestant's car is pulled forward, up the ramp and off the end to fall into the water.
73	Rocket Sledge	5	3	The contestants sit on giant toy rockets mounted to tracks at the edge of the pool. The contestant with the wrong answer is accelerated forwards, flinging them off the rocket and into the water.
77	Mace Off	6	3	Similar to #61, but with a giant inflatable mace poised behind each contestant.
84	Total Carnage	5	4	Wearing harnesses attached to safety ropes, the contestants stand on the bonnets of cars suspended above the pool. The car of the contestant with the wrong answer is dropped into the water and the contestant is lowered slowly down after it.
87	The Human Cannon	8	3	The contestants climb into cannons pointed out over the pool. The one with the wrong answer is launched into the water.
90	The Drag	3	4	The contestants lie flat in wheeled metal cages on a racetrack, tethered to the rear bumper of a race car. The contestant with the wrong answer is towed away at high speed.
94	Ejector Seat	4	3	Same as #73, but the contestants sit in ejection seats.
97	Armchair Armageddon	2	3	The contestants sit in armchairs at the edge of the pool, facing away from it. The one with the wrong answer is flipped backwards off their chair and into the water.
99	Steve's Big Boot	7	2	The contestants stand at the edge of the platform, facing the pool and hunched over slightly to present their buttocks toward Jones. He wears an oversized boot on one foot, which he uses to shove the contestant with the wrong answer into the water.
101	The Trap Door	All	5 (Final Round)	The three remaining contestants stand on trapdoors above the water. The doors open beneath the feet of the two who have chosen incorrect answers, dropping them into the water, leaving the third player standing alone to win the £10,000 prize.
N/A	Emergency Exit	All	Bonus Round	The contestants are strapped into harnesses attached to pulleys. Based on a random draw, each is suspended above an 80-foot vertical shaft and asked a question. The first contestant to answer incorrectly is eliminated and lowered slowly down the shaft as stagehands dump buckets of food and slime over them.

== International versions ==
Country	Name	Host	Network	Date premiered	Prize
Argentina	Alto juego	Guido Kaczka	Telefe	9 September 2010 – 30 October 2010	New car
China	心跳阿根廷; Xin Tiao A Gen Ting	Zuo Yan (Season 1 only); Chen Huan	Zhejiang Television	7 January 2012 – 14 September 2012	Airline tickets to London during 2012 Summer Olympics or 10,000 RMB yuan in cash
Germany	101 Wege aus der Härtesten Show der Welt	Daniel Hartwich	RTL	4 September 2010	€25,000
Israel	101 דרכים לעוף משעשועון; 101 Drakhim Lauf MeShashuon	Ofer Shechter	Channel 2 (Reshet)	10 May 2011	₪60,000
Italy	101 Modi di perdere un Game Show	Francesco Facchinetti	Rai Due	7 July 2011	No prizes
Mexico	Sale en 101 Juegos	Sherlyn Gonzalez	Televisa	3 August 2013	MX$250,000
Sweden	101 sätt att åka ur en gameshow	Mårten Andersson	TV3	4 March 2011	50,000 kr
Turkey	101	Bay J	Fox Türkiye	28 August 2010	Unknown
United States	101 Ways to Leave a Game Show	Jeff Sutphen	ABC	21 June 2011	$50,000

For many of the international versions, the tower featured in the UK version was used. It was located near to the former site of Total Wipeout. The final round in the US version also used a tower. It was located on the set of Wipeout in California.
