= 101 Ways to Leave a Game Show =

2011 American game show

- Genre: Game show
- Directed by: J. Rupert Thompson
- Presented by: Jeff Sutphen
- Music by: DVM Music
- Country of origin: United States
- Original language: English
- No. of seasons: 1
- No. of episodes: 6

Production
- Executive producer: Matt Kunitz
- Producers: Pat Romano; Rich Leist; Aaron Solomon; Scott Saltzburg
- Production location: Agua Dulce, California
- Editors: Jason Gill; Mark Arbitrario; Greg Fitzsimmons
- Camera setup: Multi-camera
- Running time: 44 minutes
- Production companies: Pulse Creative; Endemol USA; Lock and Key Productions

Original release
- Network: ABC
- Release: June 21 – July 26, 2011

101 Ways to Leave a Game Show is an American game show hosted by Jeff Sutphen. The series premiered on June 21, 2011, on ABC and ran for six episodes.

On June 9, 2010, ABC gave a greenlight for a pilot episode. On March 17, 2011, it was ordered to series by ABC. Matt Kunitz, the show's executive producer had stated "If we get a pickup, we'll do at least 12 more episodes."

== Rules ==
=== Main Game ===
The game featured eight players, but in this version, they were divided into two sets of four. Before the question is asked, the order of the contestants is determined with an educated guess question (such as "How many teeth does a lion have?") The one closest to the answer (in this case, 30) gets the first choice of answers from four picks (three in the second round), and the others in ascending order. If a player got an educated guess question exactly right, that contestant won a US $101 bonus.

The question (in this case, name a person on Forbes' highest earning dead celebrity list with the choices being Paul Newman, Dr. Seuss, Albert Einstein and George Steinbrenner) is asked. For all answers, there is one incorrect answer; all remaining answers (three in round one, two in round two) are correct. The player who picks last is locked into the one answer not chosen by the other players; the person who picks the wrong answer (in this case, Paul Newman) is eliminated in spectacular fashion (riding a biplane wing, pulled off a dock by a speedboat or blasted off in a chair rigged with an explosive device).

=== The Tower ===
The final round was staged on a platform that was 100 feet (30 m) above water. As in the preliminary rounds, an educated guess question is asked, and the closest to the number is first. Unlike the early rounds, only one answer is correct, and the others are wrong (An example being "According to Box Office Mojo, what movie sold the most tickets in the USA?" chosen among Star Wars, Titanic, Avatar and Gone with the Wind.) The three incorrect answer choosers are dropped into the water, and the person who remains (choosing Gone with the Wind) won the US $50,000 grand prize and if the winning player got the educated question right then their total is $50,101. Each episode features a different way in which the contestants fall into the water (apart from the first episode and the last episode where the way of falling is the same).

== Episodes ==
No.	Title	Winner	Original release date	Viewers (millions)
1	"You Fuse, You Lose"	Ara	June 21, 2011	5.57
Eliminated: Round 1: Kelly (On a Wing and a Prayer), Matt (Road Rage). Round 2: Chuck (Single Car Pileup), Trish (You Fuse, You Lose). Round 3: Jasmine, Art, Sharon (The Tower) [for this episode, it's called "The Drop of Terror"] Winner: Ara; Title Reference: The fourth way to be eliminated from this episode, a pun on the cliché "You choose, you lose."
2	"Get Him Away From Me"	Ray	June 28, 2011	5.33
Eliminated: Round 1: A.J. (Powerboat Yank), Nischelle (The Monster Truck Squash). Round 2: Doug (Down with the Ship), Jaime (Airlift). Round 3: Matt, Daniel, Morgan (The Tower [for this episode, it's called "Blast Chance"]); Winner: Ray; Title Quotation from: Nischelle, after she was squashed by "Truck Norris" on the 'Monster Truck Squash' segment.
3	"This Is the Scariest Thing I've Ever Done"	Susie	July 5, 2011	4.92
Eliminated: Round 1: Vivicca (The Balls of Doom), Catherine (What the Truck?). Round 2: Rick (Flame Out), Deondray (Thrust Me). Round 3: Darrin, Angelina, Paul (The Tower [for this episode, it's called "Flop 'Til You Drop"]); Winner: Susie; Title Quotation from: Catherine, after she was eliminated on "What The Truck?"
4	"I'm Not Liking This At All"	Michele (Note: Collected US $101 for getting an educated guess question exactly correct.)	July 12, 2011	4.56
Eliminated: Round 1: Julie (Wrong in 60 Seconds), Lee (All Washed Up). Round 2: Todd (Stage Fright), Emily (Tragic Carpet Ride). Round 3: Deon, John, Alyssa (The Tower [named for this episode "Last Man Leaning"]); Winner: Michele*; Title Quotation from: Deon, before the wrong answer on "All Washed Up"
5	"Indiana Jeff and the Temple of Boom"	Paige Apar	July 19, 2011	4.76
Eliminated: Round 1: Robert (Nothin' But Net), Sean (Release The Hound!). Round 2: Jasmine (No Pane, No Gain), Lisa (Indiana Jeff and the Temple of Boom). Round 3: Ian, Joshua, Gina (The Tower [named for this episode "Now You Seat Me, Now You Don't"]). Winner: Paige; Title Reference: The fourth way to leave in this episode. It spoofs the movie Indiana Jones and the Temple of Doom.
6	"Drop Me, Man! Just Drop Me, DROP ME!!"	Christina	July 26, 2011	4.4
Eliminated: Round 1: Matt (Anchor Management), Will (Yes, We Cannon). Round 2: Dennis (Shark Bait), Jessica (Go Fish). Round 3: DeShea, Patrice, Marceia (The Tower) [for this episode, it's called "The Drop of Terror"] Winner: Christina; Title Quotation From:: DeShea before being eliminated in "The Tower."

== The 101 Ways to Leave a Game Show ==
Please note that although the title suggests there are 101 Ways used, only 25 were shown on the actual program.

Number	Name	Method	Round
1	On a Wing and a Prayer	The contestant with the wrong answer is sent on a biplane like a wing walker off into elimination.	1
2	Road Rage	The contestant with the wrong answer is sent off a moving truck at 65 miles per hour (105 km/h).	1
3	Single Car Pileup	The contestants are in cars strapped to a rope. The contestant with the wrong answer gets flipped out with the help of a zip-line and a ramp. Identical to Way 46, Flipping Wreck, of the UK original.	2
4	You Fuse, You Lose	All the contestants sit in individual pilot chairs with a box of explosives underneath, each crate having a fuse to them that is lit. The contestant with the wrong answer is sent upwards by the explosion beneath them.	2
5	Powerboat Yank	The contestants stand on a dock wearing life jackets with their backs to a lake; those vests are connected by a rope to the stern of a powerboat's hull. The incorrect contestant, on cue, gets yanked off the pier and skids on water behind the tow of the boat, going in excess of 100 miles per hour (160 km/h).	1
6	The Monster Truck Squash	Each contestant takes their place in the driver's seat of one of four cars, parked parallel to each other. The contestant with the incorrect answer gets their car crushed under the force of the monster truck, "Truck Norris" (actually Gary Schott's Terminator).	1
7	Down with the Ship	The contestants each man a small rowboat on a lake. The host fires a cannonball onto the ship of the wrong contestant, sinking them out of the game. They sink with the ship as they are connected to it, so technically they die by drowning.	2
8	Airlift	All the contestants are connected, via harness and rope, to a hovering helicopter in the background. The wrong contestant is pulled off the ground and removed from the scene accordingly. Identical to Way 23, Chopper Pull, of the UK original.	2
9	The Balls of Doom	The contestants are individually strapped into steel balls perched on top of a hill. The wrong answer to the question sends the loser downhill. But instead of a pool in the UK version's Way 1, Balls of Doom, the loser is sent downhill into a ravine of a mining quarry at estimated speeds around 35 miles per hour (56 km/h).	1
10	What the Truck?	The contestant with the wrong answer is dropped off on a pickup truck that goes over a cliff, and explodes. Luckily, a helicopter is attached to the players' harness to pull them to safety.	1
11	Flame Out	The contestants are put with their backs against a wooden wall that is set ablaze and yanked back by a fire hose blast for the losing contestant.	2
12	Thrust Me	The contestants are strapped to jet packs attached to a pulley that sends the loser into a ravine.	2
13	Wrong in 60 Seconds	Each contestant is standing on top of a car's roof, propped up by a safety harness. The wrong contestant is driven by a stunt driver off the set, crashing through blocks and various obstacles along the way.	1
14	All Washed Up	The four contestants pair up and stand in window washing rigs. After a player gets saved from each pair, the rig with the wrong contestant sends them into a free fall down the side of the building.	1
15	Stage Fright	Three contestants each stand behind a podium with their backs to the edge of a building. The player who picked the wrong answer gets yanked from behind off the building after being punched by a microphone.	2
16	Tragic Carpet Ride	On three red carpets, each contestant takes their stand; whilst a limo is hooked onto the far end. For the wrong contestant, they fall onto the carpet, and the limo behind them drags their red carpet and that player away from the scene.	2
17	Nothing But Net	Each contestant is standing on top of a snare net. The wrong contestant is flown off in their net 100 feet (30 m) into the air.	1
18	Release The Hound	Dressed in safety gear, the contestant with the wrong answer runs off being chased by a hungry pitbull named Twinkie.	1
19	No Pane, No Gain	At a western saloon, the three players stand behind the bar. The contestant whose answer is incorrect gets thrown through a candy glass plate window by two stuntmen named Morty and Shorty.	2
20	Indiana Jeff and the Temple of Boom	Standing behind mine carts, the person who gets the wrong answer is ejected at the end of the track, and gets sent skyward.	2
21	Anchor Management	The players are attached via life jacket to a chain and anchor. The loser's anchor is dropped into the sea by the host, and the anchor drags that player into the sea.	1
22	Yes, We Cannon	The players are placed in cannons. The loser is shot into the water.	1
23	Shark Bait	The players hang from the back of a boat by way of harness. The incorrect answer sends that player into the sea.	2
24	Go Fish	The players sit backwards in a cart with fish. The loser is ejected into the sea with the fish.	2
101	The Tower	Each contestant must stand above the pool of water 10 stories high on "The Tower". For the losing contestants, elimination sends them downwards into the pool in various ways.	3
