= U-Pick Live =

- The final U-Pick Live logo, used from October 4, 2004 to May 27, 2005.
- Genre: Live Action; Variety
- Created by: Various
- Starring: Brent Popolizio; Candace Bailey; Pick Boy; Antonio Neves; Logan Sekulow; Tom Lamberth; Garbagio; Kenneth Harton; Henry (1999-2000); June (1999-2000); Mr. Foot (1999-2000)
- Country of origin: United States
- Original language: English
- No. of seasons: 5
- No. of episodes: 401

Production
- Executive producer: Richard Barry
- Producer: Jonathan Judge
- Production location: New York City
- Camera setup: Single-Camera
- Running time: 120 (counting commercials)

Original release
- Network: Nickelodeon
- Release: October 14, 2002 – May 27, 2005

Related
- Slime Time Live; ME:TV; Nick in the Afternoon Nickelodeon SPLAT!; Nick Studio 10

U-Pick Live was a program that aired on Nickelodeon from October 14, 2002, to May 27, 2005, on weekday afternoons from Nickelodeon's headquarters in New York City's Times Square. Airing from 5:00pm to 7:00pm EST, the show allowed viewers to pick via internet voting the Nickelodeon shows, usually cartoons, that would air. The hosts of the show also took part in sketches and gags, often including members of the studio audience and celebrity guests. Interviews with celebrity guests and musical performances were also frequent features.

It was originally U-Pick Friday from 1999 to late 2000, hosted by Henry and June of KaBlam!. The concept of U-Pick originated with the Nick in the Afternoon block in 1994. After U-Pick Live's cancellation, the concept of user-chosen programming would not return until its comeback as part of The '90s Are All That in 2011.

== Cast ==
- Brent Popolizio as himself
- Candace Bailey as herself
- Jeff Sutphen as Pick Boy, a "Super Hero" that "picks" people from the audience. Pick Boy is egotistic yet naïve. Pick Boy became a target to many polls at nick.com such as "What kind of hairstyle should Pick Boy Have?". Despite his popularity, Pick Boy was kicked off the show literally when he was voted the most in a poll asking "Who should be kicked off from the show forever?". Pick Boy was brought back to the show next season. After U-Pick Live ended, Pick Boy made many appearances in ads, 2006–2007 Nickelodeon Kids' Choice Awards, Slime Across America, and ME:TV. He made an appearance at the Democratic National Convention in August 2008 for Nickelodeon's Kids Pick the President campaign and at the 2011 San Diego Comic-Con.
- Antonio Neves as himself (2002–2004), best known by fans on the show for playing the Nicktoon tapes and using extreme stunts to deliver the tape. He also appears as Antonio's Floating Head.
- Kevin Maher as Garbagio (2002–2004), best known by fans on the show for wrestling random objects (most notably, in a special episode entitled: "Milk and Cookies"). Wears a modified Mil Mascaras wrestling mask.
- Tom Lamberth as Cow, a guy in a cow suit that might just stand there and moo, or do various strange things. There was also another cow, more realistic.
- Kenneth Harton as Professor Pickens, usually made inventions such as Pick-Bot 2000.
- Logan Sekulow played "Logan the Intern" on a number of the final season programs. He was best known for his dance off with Brent and he also sang with Brent on a number of skits. Sekulow, the son of Christian activist and attorney Jay Sekulow, has since starred in his own Christian-oriented talk show, The Logan Show.
- Noah Segan as Henry
- Julia McIlvaine as June

== Regular aspects ==
=== Activities and sketches ===
- The Prize Wall — A member of the studio audience picks one of 14 and 5/8 doors to try to get the Bucket of Bucks. All the other doors have other possible prizes behind them. Prizes could be anything from electronics to random junk such as a plunger. Starting on June 21, 2004, the Prize Wall was redesigned as a punchboard with 9 paper-covered holes.
- Candace's Corner — Candace talks to the viewers about various subjects, though she is frequently interrupted by other members of the cast.
- Brent and Candace go outside to Times Square to do various things picked online by viewers.
- Boys vs. Girls – Brent and boys from the audience compete against Candace and girls from the audience in various, often messy, games.
- Celebrity guests engage in a lightning-round style barrage of silly questions and commands from audience members. Acting silly with kids frequently takes celebrities off guard and brings out a side of them we do not typically see.
- Ten Seconds with Brent — What the title suggests. Normally, Brent would be cut off in the middle of an important sentence. Once, he got a "cookie-on-a-string" to distract the stagehand who managed the timer, successfully preventing him from starting it for about thirty seconds. On one occasion, he was given only three seconds.
- This or That - Brent would ask celebrities a series of questions and then the person who Brent is talking to has to take right or left to answer them.
- SpongeBob ShoutOut - Brent and Candace pick out a card and whoever gets picked gets to go on the phone to talk to U-Pick Live only to see what that SpongeBob SquarePants episode goes out to.

=== Gags ===
- Antonio delivering a tape of the chosen Nickelodeon show to where it apparently will be played.
- Garbagio "wrestling" various objects.
- Pick-Bot 2000, robotic co-host
- Obstacle course races in the hallways of the studio.
- Pick Boy runs through walls of shaving cream, bricks, etc.
- Mr. Chi Chi, chimpanzee attorney at law
- Pantsing Candace. On one episode, they had to cut to break as Candace's shorts came off revealing a red thong.
- Sometimes during a cut-in after a commercial break, it would feature Brent in front of the camera talking with Candace behind him. While he was talking, his arms were wrapped behind Candace. Candace put her arms through his arm pits and she moved her arms to correspond to what he was saying. This is revealed after Brent is done explaining. Candace backs away quickly, revealing the illusion. This happened 5 or 6 times during the run of U-Pick. The first occurred on the Thanksgiving special.

=== Other ===
- Best of U-Pick Live episodes aired occasionally, featuring highlights of previous shows.
- Producers: Jonathan Judge, Mitchell Goldstein, Jeremy Slutskin
- The series was directed by Joe Perota
- Slime Time Live would often transfer viewers from STL to U-Pick Live near Slime Time Live's end.
- Once there was a blizzard that came to New York and Slime Time Live was in charge of U-Pick Live for that particular day.
- The executive producers of U-Pick Live were Richard Barry and Kevin Weist.
- In the premiere of the new The Fairly OddParents episode "Timmy's Big Super Hero Wish", they hosted a contest where the child who wins would become Pick Boy's new sidekick and added to the show. Despite this, no such character was ever added.

The first U-Pick Live logo used from October 14, 2002, to June 18, 2004.
