= Dave Aizer =

American television host, writer and producer

- Born: November 24, 1974 (age 50)
- Occupation(s): Host, writer, producer
- Years active: 1999–present

David Ross Aizer (born November 24, 1974) is an American television host, writer and producer. Currently, he is a public speaking and media coach, and the founder of the Public Speaking and Media Consultancy, DaveAizer.com.

Previously, Dave was the channel host for WSFL-TV The CW in South Florida. He hosted the weekly talk show Inside South Florida, the morning news program Eye Opener, and The Morning Show—a daily, live television morning show.

== Career ==
Prior to his work at WSFL, Aizer was an anchor/reporter for The Onion News Network and a contributor/reporter for Hollywood's Top 10 on Reelz. He also created/exec produced and hosted Bleacherbloggers.com, an online sports talk show centered on the sports blogging community. In addition, he's served as a writer for Tru TV, and hosted shows for Spike TV, American Idol Online and more.

Aizer hosted the Nickelodeon show Slime Time Live and is in the Guinness Book of World Records for the most slime dumped at one time. He also hosted Nickelodeon GAS, and Nickelodeon Robot Wars on Nickelodeon.

Prior to his success on Nickelodeon, Aizer hosted Disney's ESPN Club interviewing professional athletes such as Joe Namath, Pete Rose, Barry Bonds, and Reggie Jackson. He also served as a play by play broadcaster and sports director for the University of Miami's student radio station, WVUM.

In addition, Aizer was a member of the Groundlings Improv Comedy Troupe in Los Angeles.

Aizer graduated from Marjory Stoneman Douglas High School and the University of Miami.
