= Kids Pick the President =

Children's presidential mock election by Nickelodeon

Kids Pick the President is an organized mock election by Nickelodeon to determine children's choice for the President of the United States. A series of specials around the election are also produced by Nickelodeon during this time. Since 1988, Kids Pick the President has accurately predicted the winner of each election with the exceptions of the 2004, 2016, and 2024 presidential elections.

== History ==
Kids Pick the President began in 1988, as part of a year-long "Kids Vote" election-related coverage, in part as a way to encourage children in Nickelodeon's audience to become engaged in the political process, and partly for comedic value. George H. W. Bush won the first Kids Pick the President ballot over Michael Dukakis.

The 1992 election was sponsored by Target Corporation, and promoted by newspaper advertisements. Children voted in-person at Target stores, which were used as polling stations. Democrat Bill Clinton narrowly won the mock election over Republican George H. W. Bush and Independent Ross Perot.

Throughout 1996, bumpers were presented by Melissa Joan Hart to provide updates for the election and encourage viewers to stay updated about national issues especially as they grow older. Bill Clinton, Bob Dole, and Ross Perot all participated and responded to questions from children. The voting was conducted through televote; children voted to reelect Clinton over Dole and Perot.

In the 2000 poll, 400,000 children participated through an 800 number. Both Al Gore and George W. Bush made campaign appearances at Nickelodeon studios and expressed support for the effort to educate children about the election process. An episode of Nick News featuring interviews with Bush and Gore and their responses to questions about healthcare, taxes, gun control, and the death penalty aired on October 12, and a winner was announced on October 23. Bush won Nickelodeon's election poll with 55%–45% over Gore.

In 2004, Nickelodeon promoted the event with interstitials throughout its regular programming, features in Nickelodeon Magazine, online activities, and a book. Both John Kerry and George W. Bush declined to appear, stating they were too busy. An episode of Nick News about the election aired on October 17. The results were announced by Linda Ellerbee on U-Pick Live two days later on October 19. Kerry received 57 percent of the vote; President Bush received 43 percent. This would be the first time where its election ballot went against the winner of the general election.

In 2008, 2.2 million children participated in the event. Both Barack Obama and John McCain participated; both filmed television commercials promoting the event as well as appearing in an episode of Nick News on October 12, which featured candidate biographies and the candidates answering questions sent by children. Participants were allowed to vote, without any voter eligibility or verification, on a non-partisan page of Nickelodeon's website that outlined the candidates' positions on various issues. Obama narrowly won with 51 percent (1,167,087 votes), while McCain received 49 percent (1,129,945 votes). Linda Ellerbee announced the 2008 results on October 20, as part of a commercial break during an episode of Drake & Josh.

In 2012, Mitt Romney declined to participate, citing scheduling constraints; instead, clips were shown from previous campaign events in which the participants' questions were addressed. In contrast, Barack Obama invited the participants to meet him in person at the White House to answer their questions. The decision by Romney to not participate was considered by Nick News host Linda Ellerbee to be an example of his lack of "respect" for youth; the Obama campaign also responded by stating that children "demand details", and wanted "answers on why Romney could increase their class sizes, eliminate their teacher's jobs, raise taxes on their families and slash funding for Big Bird." Obama won with 65% of the vote over Republican challenger Romney.

In 2016, Nickelodeon's poll conducted three candidates: Republican Donald Trump, Democrat Hillary Clinton, and Libertarian Gary Johnson. Nickelodeon only offered information on the Democratic and Republican nominees. It was the first election since Ellerbee's retirement from Nick News, and this was reflected as coverage was seen less on Nickelodeon than in previous elections. The results were announced on November 5, as part of a short feature during a series of election-themed episode premieres of the network's sitcom block. New episodes of Henry Danger, Game Shakers, and School of Rock aired along with a rerun of an episode of Nicky, Ricky, Dicky & Dawn. Clinton was the winner, with 53 percent of the vote; Trump received 36 percent while Johnson received 11 percent; this would be the second time the Kids Pick the President winner would not match the winner of the general election.

In 2020, Nickelodeon's poll was conducted between Trump and his Democratic challenger, Joe Biden. The results of the poll was announced during a one-hour Nick News special titled Nick News: Kids Pick the President hosted by Keke Palmer that aired on Nickelodeon and its sister networks on October 27. Libertarian candidate Jo Jorgensen voiced her disapproval with the children's network for excluding her from the poll and stated they were "complicit in indoctrinating our children that there are only 2 parties". On October 21, the network detected cheating, when threads on online forums began discussing corrupting the Kids Pick the President site with fraudulent votes. Eventually, more than 130,000 bot-generated votes were detected and Nickelodeon utilized a voter certification tool to identify these counterfeit votes and to remove them, ensuring that only individually placed votes counted toward the total. Biden won the poll with 53% of the vote, followed by Trump with 47%.

In 2024, a special election episode of Nick News aired on October 28, 2024, and was hosted by Nate Burleson and his daughter Mia providing context about the election process and featured clips of both major party candidates answering questions about economics, artificial intelligence, school safety, and healthcare. Nickelodeon actors such as Kira Kosarin also appeared and encouraged children to stay up to date about civics and vote once they turn 18. The result was announced at the end of the program with Democratic nominee Kamala Harris winning with 52% of the vote over Republican Donald Trump, who received 48%. This was the third time Nickelodeon's election ballot went against the winner of the general election.

== Table of elections ==
Democratic candidate Republican candidate Independent candidate Reform candidate Libertarian candidate Presidential election winner

Year	Winner		Runners-up				Ref.
Year	Candidate	Vote percentage	Candidate	Vote percentage	Candidate	Vote percentage	Ref.
1988	H. W. Bush	51%	Dukakis	49%	—N/a		
1992	B. Clinton	38%	H. W. Bush	37.9%	Perot	24%	
1996	B. Clinton	45%	Dole	37%	Perot	18%	
2000	W. Bush	55%	Gore	45%	—N/a		
2004	Kerry	57%	W. Bush	43%	—N/a		
2008	Obama	51%	McCain	49%	—N/a		
2012	Obama	65%	Romney	35%	—N/a		
2016	H. Clinton	53%	Trump	36%	Johnson	11%	
2020	Biden	53%	Trump	47%	—N/a		
2024	Harris	52%	Trump	48%	—N/a		

== Other children's elections ==
The "Scholastic Election" has been conducted by Scholastic Corporation Scholastic News every election year since 1940. It claims to have predicted the final election results correctly with three exceptions: Harry S. Truman's win over Thomas E. Dewey in the 1948 United States presidential election, John F. Kennedy's win over Richard Nixon in the 1960 United States presidential election, and Donald Trump's win over Hillary Clinton in the 2016 United States presidential election.

Mock elections also take place in school classrooms, as part of a curriculum exercise in the American democratic process, with different programs designed for kindergarten through high school students. Such examples include the 2020 statewide mock election in Tennessee with results announced by the Tennessee Secretary of State. In the vote, Trump defeated Joe Biden with 52% of the vote, with third-party candidate Kanye West receiving 10%.
