= You're On! =

- Genre: Game show Comedy
- Created by: Michael Binkow; Joe Revello
- Written by: Phil Moore
- Directed by: Jared Cory
- Starring: Phil Moore; Vivianne Collins; Travis White
- Narrated by: Andie Karvelis
- Composer: Rick Witkowski
- Country of origin: United States
- Original language: English
- No. of seasons: 1
- No. of episodes: 26

Production
- Production location: Nickelodeon Studios Florida
- Running time: 30 minutes
- Production companies: Marjesam Productions; Nickelodeon Productions

Original release
- Network: Nickelodeon
- Release: August 3 – December 5, 1998

You're On! is an American children's television game show that aired from August 3 to December 5, 1998 on Nickelodeon with reruns until April 5, 1999 and on Nick GAS until it was pulled off from the schedule on November 26, 2004.

It came as the last show to be part of Nick in the Afternoon in debut.

== Premise ==
The show adopted a premise similar to Candid Camera. However, to better suit a children's game show format, You're On! featured young contestants trying to convince passersby to complete a series of predetermined tasks while unknowingly being filmed.

The show was taped in Soundstage 18 of Nickelodeon Studios Florida and was hosted by Phil Moore.

The remote hosts for You're On! were Vivianne Collins and Travis White. These two briefed the kids on their tasks, congratulated them when all three tasks were completed, or let them know time was up.

== Rules ==
Two kid contestants on a remote location work together to complete three tasks, each with a common theme. The tasks involved convincing a passerby to do silly things, like kissing a fish or playing hopscotch with one kid riding piggyback on them. The kids had 10 minutes to do this. Performing all three tasks won a prize (such as a Nintendo 64, snowboards, or camping equipment), failing won a smaller prize (usually a gift certificate). The contestants could get anyone to do the first task, but for safety reasons, the second and third tasks had to be done by an adult.

Three games like this were played. The later two games had a feature called the "Runaround", played in the studio. Six people, two from each colored section of the audience, were called down. After they saw the three tasks the kids had to perform, they had to guess how many tasks they thought the kids would complete. Getting it right won a prize.

In the first runaround, all six players were kids. In the second, it was three kids and three adults who were somehow related to the kids.

At the end of each show, one of the adult Runaround losers and their kid were called to the center of the stage. There, Moore and the kid did gross things to them, such as pouring slime on them, asking them questions with a messy penalty for a wrong answer delivered by the kid, or getting them to stomp on large purple balloons to make "grape juice". The messy things Moore did to the adults were based on at least one of the tasks from earlier in the show, usually tasks that were not completed. On the final episode, the tables were turned on Moore. Before Moore could call anyone to the center of the stage, Collins and White suddenly walked in from backstage. They, along with Moore's own son David, proceeded to slime him with a variety of substances. On another episode, Moore called all three adults center stage and had them bob for apples in a bowl of jello and whipped cream, blindfolded, with the kids giving them directions.

== See also ==
- Game Show in My Head
