= Jessica Holmes (television presenter) =

American television personality (born 1976)

- Born: Jessica Renee Holmes; November 17, 1976 (age 49); Cleveland, Ohio, U.S.
- Education: University of Central Florida
- Occupation: News anchor
- Years active: 1999–present
- Employer: KTLA-TV (November 2005–present)
- Known for: News anchor for KTLA-TV
- Spouse: Arie Solomon (m. 2015)
- Children: 2
- Website: thejessicaholmes.com

Jessica Renee Holmes (born November 17, 1976) is an American television personality. She was the co-host of the popular Nickelodeon TV series Slime Time Live. She is currently a morning news anchor of the KTLA Morning News in Los Angeles.

== Career ==
Jessica Holmes was an intern for Nickelodeon in 1999 when she was approached by a producer in a hallway at the network and was asked if she would like to appear on air. She agreed and six months later she began co-hosting the show Slime Time Live. Slime Time Live ran for eight seasons between 2000 and 2004.

In 2003, Holmes was hired to host Bragging Rights for the OLN cable network (formerly Outdoor Life Network). Bragging Rights was a 13-episode reality television show and Holmes served as the host.

Following her brief stint on OLN, Holmes decided to relocate to Los Angeles to further her television career. At the time of her move she did not have a new job. Her agent submitted an application for Holmes to appear in a KTLA Morning News competition called "The Audition". "The Audition" was a segment on the KTLA Morning News that was a game show competition. The winner of the competition was reportedly going to be the new weathercaster on the show. Holmes won the competition which was determined by viewer votes.

After winning the competition at KTLA Morning News, Holmes began doing weather segments on the show. A month later, Holmes was hired as a helicopter-based traffic reporter for the show. After two years of reporting traffic, Holmes was tapped to co-host a new 9 am news show. Holmes later expanded her duties to include co-hosting the 7 am KTLA Morning News broadcast, replacing Michaela Pereira. In addition, she regularly hosts the preshows for the Primetime Emmy Awards as well as the Oscars.

== Personal life ==
Holmes lives in Los Angeles and is married to Arie Solomon. She gave birth to a son, Levi, on October 8, 2015. Holmes gave birth to her second child, Theo, on May 3, 2022.
