= Boca (The Sopranos) =

- The Sopranos episode
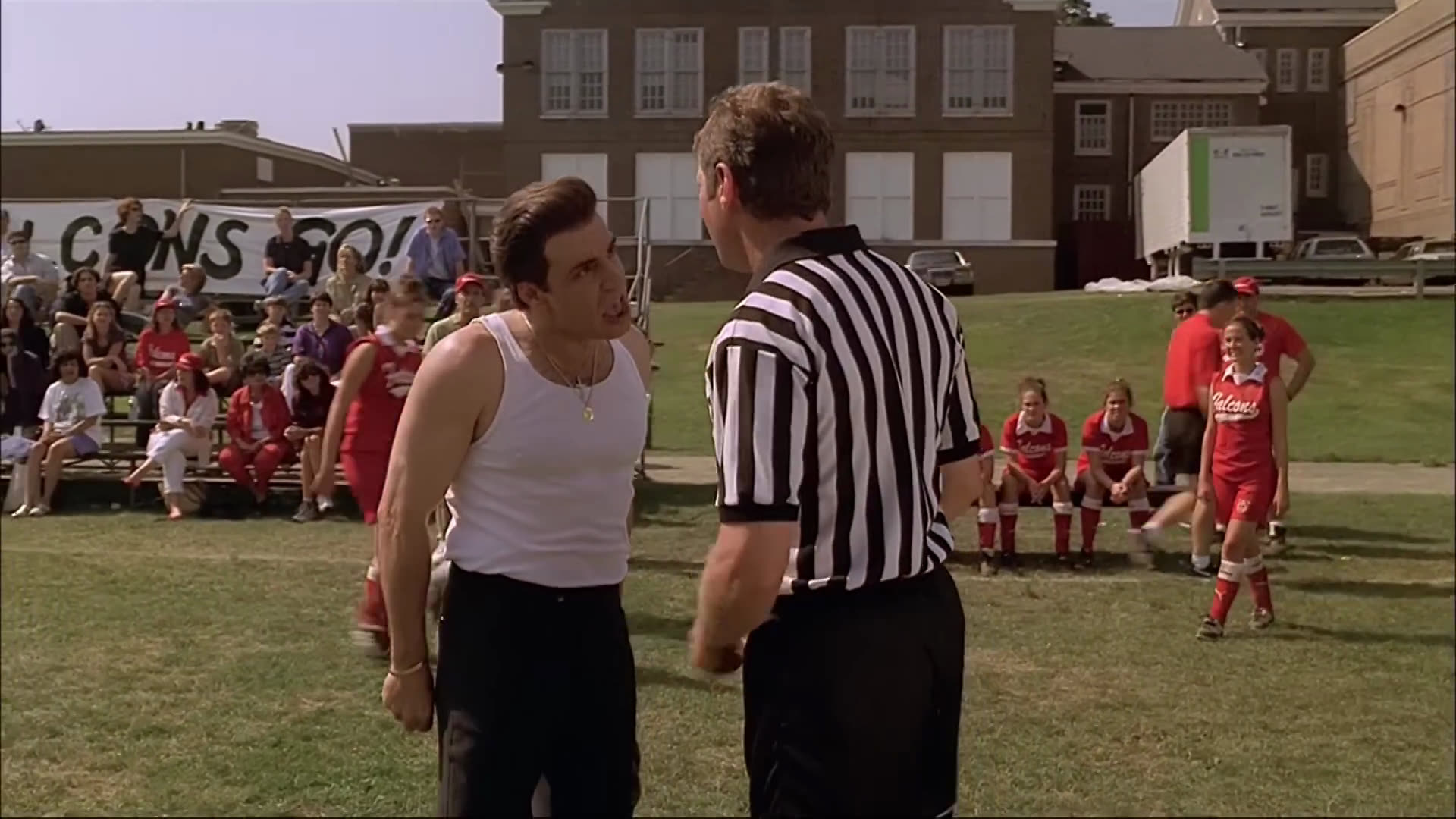
- Silvio Dante arguing with a referee at the soccer match
- Episode no.: Season 1 Episode 9
- Directed by: Andy Wolk
- Written by: Jason Cahill; Robin Green; Mitchell Burgess
- Cinematography by: Phil Abraham
- Production code: 109
- Original air date: March 7, 1999
- Running time: 51 minutes

Episode chronology
← Previous "The Legend of Tennessee Moltisanti"	Next → "A Hit Is a Hit"
- The Sopranos season 1

"Boca" is the ninth episode of the HBO television series The Sopranos. It was written by Jason Cahill, Robin Green and Mitchell Burgess, directed by Andy Wolk and originally aired on March 7, 1999.

== Starring ==
- James Gandolfini as Tony Soprano
- Lorraine Bracco as Dr. Jennifer Melfi
- Edie Falco as Carmela Soprano
- Michael Imperioli as Christopher Moltisanti
- Dominic Chianese as Corrado Soprano, Jr.
- Vincent Pastore as Pussy Bonpensiero *
- Steven Van Zandt as Silvio Dante
- Tony Sirico as Paulie Gualtieri
- Robert Iler as Anthony Soprano, Jr.
- Jamie-Lynn Sigler as Meadow Soprano
- Nancy Marchand as Livia Soprano

* = credit only

=== Guest starring ===
- John Ventimiglia as Artie Bucco
- John Heard as Vin Makazian
- Kathrine Narducci as Charmaine Bucco

==== Also guest starring ====
- Al Sapienza as Mikey Palmice
- Robyn Peterson as Bobbi Sanfillipo
- Kevin O'Rourke as Coach Don Hauser
- Tony Darrow as Larry Boy Barese
- Joe Badalucco Jr. as Jimmy Altieri
- Richard Portnow as Attorney Melvoin
- Cara Jedell as Ally Vandermeed
- Candace Bailey as Deena Hauser
- Jaclyn Tohn as Heather Dante
- Donna Marie Recco as Bebe
- Nell Balaban as Receptionist
- Moises Belizario as FBI Man
- Mary Ellen Cravens as Taylor
- Elaine del Valle as Waitress
- Steve "Inky" Ferguson as Moldonado
- Brian Guzman as Delivery Boy
- Mark Hartman as Capman
- Patrick Husted as Waiter
- Marissa Jedell as Becky
- Joyce Lynn O'Connor as Shelly Hauser
- Annika Pergament as TV Reporter
- John Nacco as Contractor
- Bill Winkler as Soccer Ref

== Synopsis ==
Uncle Junior goes to Boca Raton, Florida, with his long-time girlfriend and secretary Bobbi Sanfillipo. In bed, she playfully praises his oral sex skills, but he stresses that she must never speak about this to anyone, and reluctantly explains that his associates "think if you suck pussy ... it's a sign of weakness." However, Bobbi has already spoken about her sex life with a woman at her nail salon. Word reaches Carmela and she tells Tony. While playing golf Junior chides Tony's athletic abilities. Angered, Tony makes thinly veiled vulgar jokes about Junior's oral sex skills. Junior realizes what is happening and contemplates killing Tony. Enraged, he fires Bobbi, smashes a pie into her face, and breaks up with her.

Tony, Silvio, and Artie invite Meadow's soccer coach Don Hauser to have drinks at the Bada Bing after a victory; they all have daughters on the team and are enthusiastic supporters. When they read in the newspaper that Don is moving to another coaching job, they try to convince him to stay. Paulie delivers a 50-inch TV to Don's house and insists he take it, while Christopher abducts Don's dog and later, as "an animal lover", returns it.

Tony tells Meadow that Don may change his mind about leaving, but she is ungrateful and upset. When he remonstrates, she tells him that Don is having sex with her teammate Ally. Tony resolves that Hauser will never do that again. During their therapy session, Dr. Melfi asks Tony why he thinks punishing Don is his responsibility. Artie tries to show Tony that he is acting for vengeance and his own satisfaction rather than justice; Tony throws Artie out of the Bada Bing, but stays alone drinking, wondering if Artie was right. Later that evening, Tony tells Silvio to cancel the hit on Don, who is arrested. Tony goes home, staggering drunk, and tells Carmela that he "didn't hurt nobody," as Meadow watches from the staircase.

== First appearance ==
- Harold Melvoin: Corrado "Junior" Soprano's lawyer.

== Title reference ==
- Junior goes to Boca Raton, Florida, with his girlfriend Bobbi Sanfillipo.
- The word "boca" in Spanish or "bocca" in Italian means "mouth". This may be a reference to Junior performing oral sex on Bobbi, as well as several secrets being revealed by several characters throughout the episode.
- The title may also be a reference to Boca Juniors, a famous Argentinian soccer club. Much of the plot focuses on Meadow’s soccer coach.

== Production ==
- This episode wrongly reports the location of the University of Rhode Island (URI), claiming that it is in Providence when, in fact, it is in Kingston on the other side of the state. While URI has a satellite campus (the Feinstein Campus) in Providence, URI's sports teams play in Kingston.
- Actor Steven Van Zandt wore his own golfing hat for a scene in which Silvio plays a round of golf.
- The Roxbury High School Girls' Soccer team (Succasunna, New Jersey) played the extras for both the opposing team and members of Meadow's team. The team used this opportunity as a fundraiser.

== Other cultural or historical references ==
- Junior mentions the "Escobedo brothers" to Mikey Palmice when explaining how it is possible for a psychiatrist to testify against a patient. This is a reference to the Menendez brothers in Beverly Hills, who killed their parents and were later turned in to the police by their psychologist, L. Jerome Oziel. Also a possible reference to Escobedo v. Illinois, 378 U.S. 478 (1964), the United States Supreme Court case holding that criminal suspects have a right to counsel during police interrogations under the Sixth Amendment.
- Junior hitting Bobbi in her face with a pie when they break up was used as an homage to The Public Enemy, where the main character does the same to his girlfriend with a cut-in-half grapefruit when he says he is leaving her. David Chase has cited The Public Enemy as an enormous influence.
- Over dinner, while discussing Ally's suicide attempt, Tony, under influence of what Dr. Melfi told him previously how self-inflicted shallow cuts to the wrists are actually a cry for help, says how she didn't really want to kill herself: "It wasn't like frigging Cobain, it was just a little suicidal gesture." He was referring to the iconic rock musician Kurt Cobain, troubled lead singer of Seattle grunge rock band Nirvana, one of the most popular rock bands of all time, who died by suicide with a self-inflicted shotgun blast to the head, at the age of 27, on the 5th of April 1994.

== Music ==
- When Junior is dancing with his girlfriend in Boca, the Spanish song played is "Frente a Frente" written by Mexican singer Juan Gabriel and sung by Spanish singer Rocío Dúrcal. This song is also played again when Corrado Soprano breaks up with her.
- In an early scene, Meadow and her friend are watching the Morphine video for "Buena", and the song, "Dawna", is also played at the end of the episode as Tony Soprano lies on the floor, and through the rolling of the end credits.
- When Coach Hauser visits the Bada Bing with Silvio Dante, the song played in the bar is "Can't You Feel the Fire" from Steven Van Zandt's album Freedom – No Compromise.
- The song played when Charmaine confronts Artie in the basement about Tony's attempted bribing of Coach Hauser is "Little Joe" by The Spaniels.
- The song Tony sings when he taunts Junior while they play golf is "South of the Border (Down Mexico Way)".
- When Tony ponders what to do with Coach Hauser in his office, the song in the background is "Woke Up This Morning (Urban Takeover Mix)" by Alabama 3, who also perform the song's Chosen One Mix in the opening credits.
- The song played when Tony comes home drunk and singing to himself is "There Was a Time" by James Brown.

== Filming locations ==
Listed in order of first appearance:

- Jersey City and Harsimus Cemetery in Jersey City, New Jersey
- Henry B. Whitehorne Middle School in Verona, New Jersey
- Satin Dolls in Lodi, New Jersey
- West Orange, New Jersey
- Lincoln Park, New Jersey
- Jersey City, New Jersey
- West Caldwell, New Jersey
- Bloomfield, New Jersey
