= Jeff Sutphen =

American actor

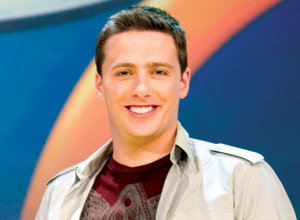
- Born: Jeffrey Sutphen; October 15, 1977 (age 49); New York City, New York, U.S.
- Occupations: Actor; producer; game show host
- Years active: 2002–present
- Spouse: Stacy Asencio Sutphen (m. 2003)
- Children: 2

Jeffrey "Jeff" Sutphen (born October 15, 1977) is an American actor, producer, and game show host known primarily for his work with Nickelodeon's BrainSurge from 2009 to 2011. From 2012 to 2013, he was the host of the show Figure It Out.

== Personal life ==
Jeff graduated with a Bachelor of Arts degree in communications from Marist College in Poughkeepsie, New York. He married his wife Stacy Sutphen on October 12, 2003. They live in Los Angeles and currently have one son and one daughter.

== Career ==
Jeff began his career in entertainment working for MTV. After switching to Nickelodeon, Jeff worked as a producer for U-Pick Live, a show where viewers would pick what programs the network would air and on which he also portrayed superhero Pick Boy. The show aired from 2002 through 2005. After serving as a producer for Nickelodeon's 2008 game show My Family's Got Guts, Jeff went on to host the network's 2009 game show BrainSurge.

At the 2010 Kids' Choice Awards, he and Lily Collins hosted the pre-award show The Countdown to Kids’ Choice! telecast live in Los Angeles.

He started hosting 101 Ways to Leave a Game Show for ABC in June 2011. On March 7, 2012 it was announced that Jeff would be the new host of the classic Nickelodeon game show Figure It Out when it came back into production in April 2012.

Jeff recently launched an internet-based talk show called The Garage Show with Jeff Sutphen. Jeff invites guests to his garage where they talk about many different topics. On the second episode, former Nickelodeon game show hosts Marc Summers, Phil Moore and Kirk Fogg were guests.

As of 2019, Jeff serves as a co-executive producer on Ryan's Mystery Playdate.

== Filmography ==
=== Television ===
Title	Year	Role
U-Pick Live	2002–05	Pick Boy
BrainSurge	2009–11	Host
101 Ways to Leave a Game Show	2011	Host
Family BrainSurge	2011	Host
Figure It Out	2012–13	Host

=== As a producer ===
Show	Year
U-Pick Live	2002
My Family's Got Guts	2008
