= Nickelodeon Robot Wars =

- Based on: Robot Wars by Tom Gutteridge; Stephen Carsey
- Presented by: Dave Aizer; Vivianne Collins
- Narrated by: Stefan Frank
- Country of origin: United States
- No. of episodes: 6

Production
- Production locations: Shepperton Studios in Shepperton, England
- Camera setup: Multi-camera
- Running time: 30–42 minutes
- Production company: Mentorn

Original release
- Network: Nickelodeon
- Release: August 25 – October 6, 2002

Nickelodeon Robot Wars is a game show that aired on Nickelodeon from August 25, 2002, to October 6, 2002. Hosted by Dave Aizer and Vivianne Collins, the show was Nickelodeon's take on Robot Wars, the popular and long-running robot-fighting game show. The show was canceled after one season, and subsequently aired on Nick GAS.

The series of six shows was filmed at Shepperton Studios in England in January 2002, at the same time as the second season of Robot Wars: Extreme Warriors, which aired on TNN in the U.S. (now Paramount Network). Both shows featured American teams and robots flown to England for the filming.

== Tournaments ==
Seven different tournaments took place over the six show series. Most of the tournaments aired within a single show, but a few spread out over multiple shows.

Tournament	Description	Robots	Winner(s)
U.S. Championship	Four robots compete in a knockout tournament for the title of U.S. Champion.	Tyranabot; Ninjitsu; Phantasm; Probophobia	Tyranabot
U.S. vs U.K Tag Team Terror	Four two-robot teams from the US and UK compete in a tag-team tournament.	The Revolutionist & Spin Doctor (USA); Zanzara & Run Away (USA); Ming 3 & Rick (UK); Bigger Brother & Kat 3 (UK)	Ming 3 & Rick
Mayhem	A series of three three-robot battles with the winner of each returning to compete in the "Ultimate Mayhem" final.	(Robots in bold won their mayhem); **Propeller Head**; Rosie The Riveter 2 Xylon; **Vert-I-Go**; Joker; Techno Trousers; Rigby; Diskotek; **The Revolutionist**	Propeller Head
Vengeance	An "open call" for teams to settle old scores against their competitors.	Bunny Attack; Hoot; Ninjitsu; Destructive Criticism; Probophobia; Spin Doctor; Xylon; Joker	Bunny Attack; Ninjitsu; Probophobia; Xylon
Challenge Belt	One robot is given the belt and defends it against challengers in one-on-one combat. Three successful defenses in a row win the tournament.	Tyranabot; Tut Tut; Rosie The Riveter 2 Probophobia	Tut Tut
Rebellion	Two competitors take on the massive "house robots".	Squirmin Vermin and Humdrum vs Dead Metal, Shunt and Sir Killalot	Dead Metal, Shunt and Sir Killalot
Annihilator	Five robots fight simultaneously in a "melee" battle. One robot is eliminated and the melee restarts with the remaining four. The process repeats until only the annihilator champion remains.	Bunny Attack; Techno Trousers; Hannibal; The Piecemaker; Basenji	Hannibal

== Adjustments and changes ==
The show featured robot competitors familiar to fans of the American series of Robot Wars, such as "Rosie The Riveter" and "The Revolutionist," but the robot operators were all children associated with the teams.

To suit the younger audience, a few adjustments and changes were made to the arena and House Robots.

- All flame hazards, including the flame pit, fire jets and Sgt Bash's flamethrower, were disabled.
- Sir Killalot was renamed "Sir K," a name he was commonly referred to in the official UK Robot Wars magazine.
- The Pit Release Bumper was moved further down the arena wall, closer to the bottom-right CPZ.
- The language used was changed, with rougher language being disallowed.

== See also ==
- Robot Combat
- BattleBots
