= Candace Bailey =

American actress and television personality

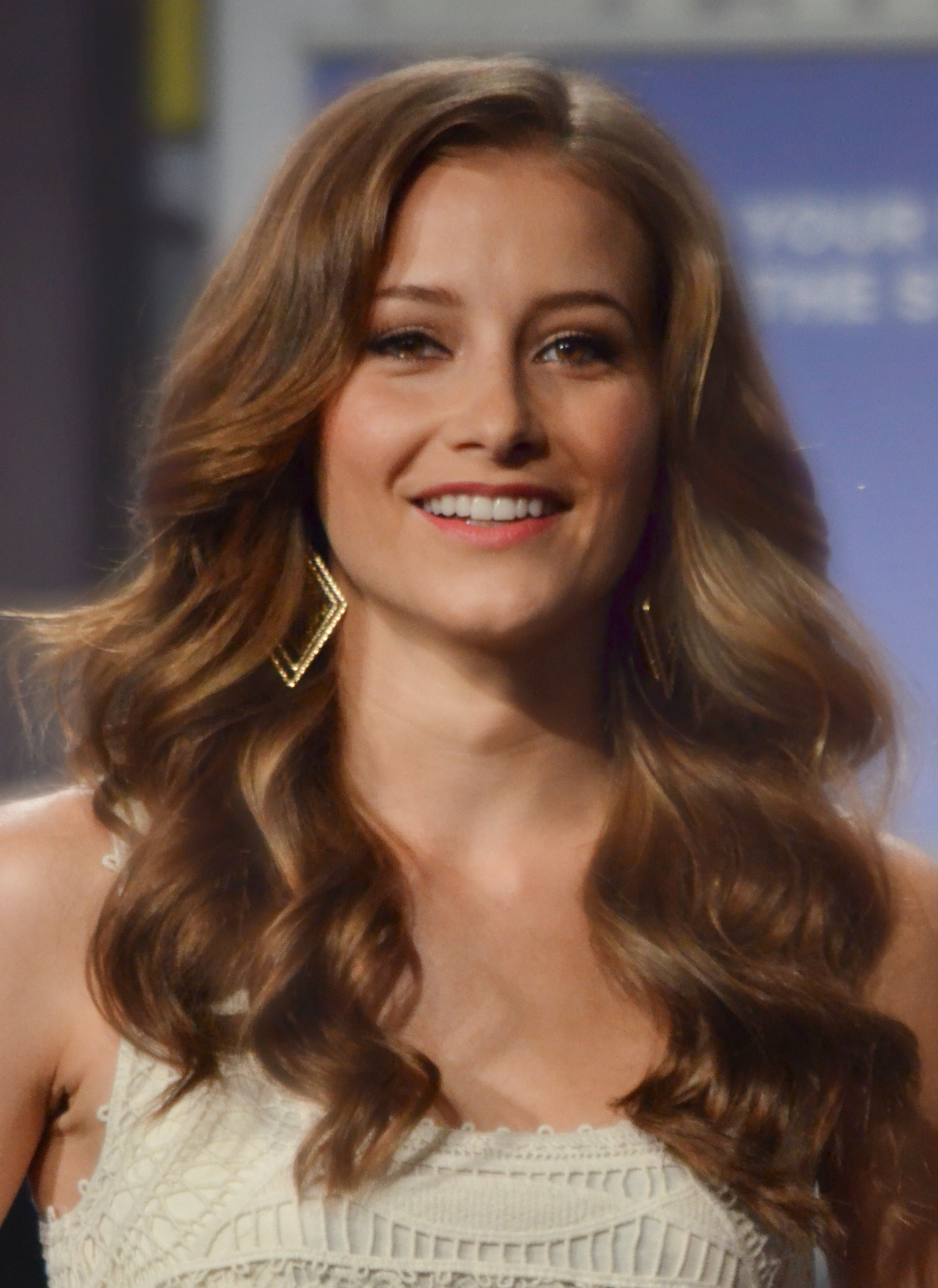
- Bailey at San Diego Comic-Con, July 2012
- Born: Birmingham, Alabama, U.S.
- Occupations: Actress, television personality
- Years active: 1999–2014

Candace Bailey is an American retired actress and television personality best known as a co-host of the former television programs U-Pick Live on Nickelodeon and Attack of the Show! on G4.

== Early life ==
Bailey was born in Birmingham, Alabama and relocated with her family to the Pensacola, Florida area at age two. At age 12, Bailey joined a New York City modeling company in the summer. Bailey graduated from Gulf Breeze High School of Gulf Breeze, Florida in 2001 and attended Marymount Manhattan College in New York City.

== Career ==
Bailey is a former Junior Olympic gymnast.

In 1999, Bailey at age 17 made her on-screen debut on The Sopranos episode "Boca" as character Deena Hauser. While attending Marymount Manhattan, Bailey got her first television presenting job on the Nickelodeon children's show U-Pick Live in 2002 and would continue on the show until 2005. Bailey hosted an April Fools Day episode of Slime Time Live on Nickelodeon in 2003. In 2004, Bailey co-hosted a children-oriented Super Bowl XXXVIII pre-game show on Nickelodeon.

In her first role as a regular character in a fictional TV series, Bailey played Skylar Stevens on the CBS series Jericho from 2006 to 2008. In 2008, Bailey appeared in the music video of "Goodnight Goodnight" by Maroon 5. After Jericho was cancelled, Bailey worked as a cocktail waitress and babysitter between acting jobs. Bailey said that the work made her more appreciative of her acting opportunities.

Bailey returned to screen acting in a fifth season episode of Ghost Whisperer in 2010. On January 11, 2011, Bailey joined Kevin Pereira (who left the show on May 31, 2012) as the new co-host of Attack of the Show! and remained on the show until its then-final episode on January 23, 2013.

== Filmography ==
=== Film ===
Year	Title	Role	Notes
2023	Attack of the Doc!	Herself	Documentary; archive footage

=== Television ===
Year	Title	Role	Notes
1999	The Sopranos	Deena Hauser	Episode: "Boca"
2001	Say What? Karaoke	Herself	Episode: "March 25, 2001"
2002–2005	U-Pick Live	Herself / Host	
2003	Slime Time Live	Herself	Episode: "April 1, 2003"
2005	Taylor Made	Sarah Taylor	Short television film
2006	Sixty Minute Man	Natalie Henderson	Unsold television pilot
2006–2008	Jericho	Skylar Stevens	16 episodes
2006–2008	Robot Chicken	Various characters (voice)	6 episodes
2010	Ghost Whisperer	Katie Walker / Rachel Blessing	Episode: "Blessings in Disguise"
2010–2013	Attack of the Show!	Herself / Host	
2012	Chris Hardwick's All-Star Celebrity Bowling	Herself	Episode: "Nerdist vs. G4"
2013	NTSF:SD:SUV	Carrie	Episode: "Burn After Killing"
2013	Anger Management	Michelle	Episode: "Charlie Gets the Party Started"
2014	The Line	Herself / Host	Episode: "Pilot"

=== Music videos ===
Year	Title	Artist	Ref.
2008	"Goodnight Goodnight"	Maroon 5	

=== Video games ===
Year	Title	Role
2004	Tak 2: The Staff of Dreams	Fauna Juju (voice)
2005	Tak: The Great Juju Challenge	Fauna Juju (voice)
