= The Line (game show) =

American game show

- Genre: Game Show
- Created by: Hans Engholm; ITV Studios
- Presented by: Jeff Davis; Candace Bailey
- Country of origin: United States
- Original language: English
- No. of seasons: 1
- No. of episodes: 1

Production
- Executive producers: Jim Berger; Patrick Jager; Michael Dietz
- Running time: 88 minutes
- Production company: High Noon Entertainment

Original release
- Network: Game Show Network
- Release: December 23, 2014

The Line is an American game show pilot co-hosted by Jeff Davis and Candace Bailey. Created by ITV Studios and produced by High Noon Entertainment, the pilot showcased contestants waiting in a "line" to enter a "vault". While in the latter, they must answer a series of eight questions to win a jackpot that grows progressively as contestants fail to answer all eight correctly. While waiting in the line, they may be chosen to perform various challenges. These can earn them additional prizes and/or a move to the front or back of the line. Critical reception for the show was mixed; one writer argued that the show's pace of gameplay was too slow, but was also pleased to see an autistic contestant compete.

== Gameplay ==
In the "Trivia Vault," contestants answer up to eight true-or-false questions, with each correct answer adding $250 to the jackpot. Those who answer all eight questions correctly win the entire jackpot, others who fail to do so are ejected from the vault, while the next contestant steps in and continues to play for the jackpot.

While a contestant is in the vault, contestants who are waiting in the line play various mini-games. The games played include passing ten people in the line through a hula-hoop, if successful, those ten move straight to the beginning of the line. Other challenges include two teams of five working as a group to move a beach ball across a track and offering random contestants the opportunity to open a red envelope that can send them to the beginning or end of the line.

== Production ==
The Line was first mentioned March 18, 2014 at Game Show Network's (GSN's) 2014−15 upfront presentation in New York City. The series, created by ITV Studios, was green-lit on July 15, 2014, with Davis and Bailey being announced as co-hosts of the show. When discussing the show's format, GSN's Executive Vice President of programming and development Amy Introcaso-Davis explained, "We have taken something most people dislike – waiting in line – and turned it into the most fun you have ever had, with cash, prizes and 500 new friends."

The show began production in its first city (Nashville, Tennessee) on July 19, 2014, continuing through July 22, 2014. On November 10, 2014, GSN announced that the series, originally supposed to air as a five-episode series, would instead air as a single-episode two-hour pilot on December 23, 2014. The show did not air a new episode after its premiere and is subsequently presumed to be canceled.

== Reception ==
The Line received mixed general reception. Carrie Grosvenor of About Entertainment argued that the show's pacing was a problem: "If the mini games were featured more heavily and the trivia bits moved along more quickly, the show would be much more interesting." Additionally, Entertainment Tonight's Denny Directo applauded the show for allowing an autistic contestant to compete, while Grosvenor called it "the highlight of the two hours for me."
