= Nick News =

American educational television series

- Intertitle (from 2009–15)
- Also known as: Nick News Special Edition
- Genre: News magazine
- Created by: Linda Ellerbee
- Presented by: Linda Ellerbee; Jamie Yuccas
- Theme music composer: Joseph Curiale (1992–2015)
- Country of origin: United States
- Original language: English
- No. of seasons: 28
- No. of episodes: 208

Production
- Executive producers: Linda Ellerbee (1992–2015); Rolfe Tessem (1992–2015); Magalie Laguerre-Wilkinson (2021–24)
- Running time: 22 minutes
- Production companies: Lucky Duck Productions (1992–2015); Nickelodeon Productions

Original release
- Network: Nickelodeon
- Release: April 18, 1992 – December 15, 2015
- Release: June 29, 2020 – March 20, 2024

Nick News (formerly titled Nick News W/5 and later Nick News with Linda Ellerbee) is an American educational television news magazine aimed at children and teenagers. It originally aired on Nickelodeon from 1992 to 2015. It also aired on Nickelodeon's sister network Noggin from 1999 to 2002. Nick News took the form of a news program discussing social, political and economic issues in a format intended to be accessible to both children and adults. In June 2020, the show was revived, and in 2024 TikTok and Instagram accounts under the Nick News banner were created.

The show is known for allowing normal American teenagers to speak out on their own personal opinions on a number of past and current worldwide issues and topics, including events such as Black History Month.

== Linda Ellerbee ==
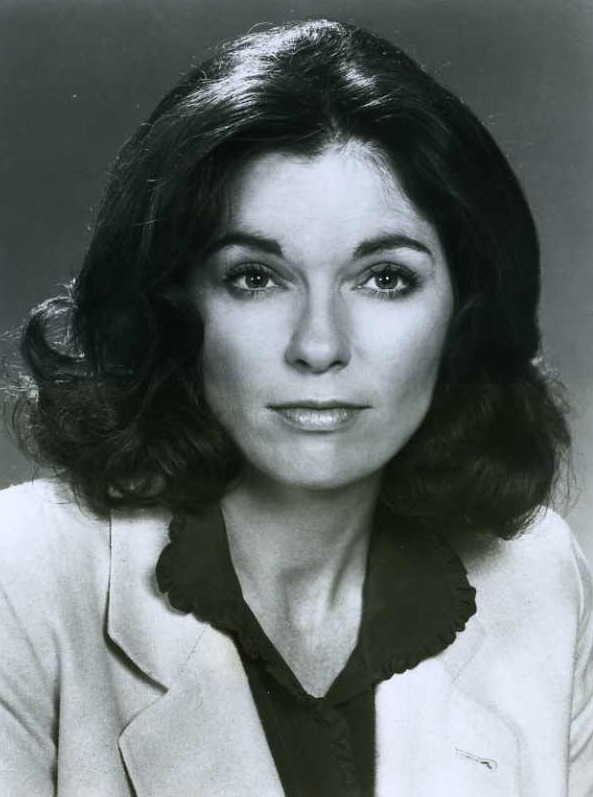
Ellerbee in 1978

Nick News was hosted by former NBC News personality Linda Ellerbee from 1992 to 2015. Ellerbee was one of five candidates auditioned over the course of two weeks. She was chosen because her competitors were "too loud and obnoxious", claimed one of the show's set designers. According to Ellerbee: "I was honored when I was named the host of Nick News. The show will be about kids and their everyday lives." Ellerbee never missed an episode due to illness. The show is officially known as Nick News with Linda Ellerbee. Throughout the years, Nick News has featured special guests of honor, such as Al Gore, Faith Hill, Rosie O'Donnell, Magic Johnson, Bill Clinton, and Dr. Phil.

== History ==
Nick News was originally known as Nick News W/5 until the show's "who, what, when, where, and why" format was dropped.

During its original run, Nick News with Linda Ellerbee was telecast on Sunday nights at 8:00 p.m. and later 8:30 p.m. with in-between times on Nickelodeon, and ran in repeats at various timeslots. Nick News was #1 in the ratings on Nickelodeon in 1992–1993, and has never gone below #6 in the ratings, making it one of the most consistently highly rated news shows on TV. From 1993 to 1997, the first-run syndicated version of the show—distributed by Viacom Enterprises (now CBS Media Ventures)—aired on local stations—both independent and network-affiliated—all over the United States of America. The show won a Peabody Award in 1994, and Linda Ellerbee won a Personal Award in 1998 for her work on the show.

The show also previously appeared on early weekday mornings, fully commercial-free as a part of the television cable industry's Cable in the Classroom initiative, which urged teachers from schools across the globe to tape episodes of Nick News and show them to their classes during school hours.

The show was a regular part of the lineup on the Noggin channel, one of Nickelodeon's sister networks, from February 1999 until March 2002.

TeenNick aired two episodes of the show in repeats on both October 25, 2010, and February 15, 2011, and also aired once as part of their nightly block The Splat from November 5–6, 2016.

Nick News is well known for many trademarks during its run on Nickelodeon, such as Ellerbee's signature tagline, "If you want to know, ask!"; the only time the sign off was not used was on the finale episode on December 15, 2015, when Ellerbee signed off with the words "And so it goes"; an homage to her previous signoff as anchor of NBC News Overnight decades earlier.

After nearly 25 years on the air, an hour-long finale titled Hello, I Must Be Going: 25 Years of Nick News with Linda Ellerbee aired on Nickelodeon on December 15, 2015. The episode featured clips from older episodes of the series. The final episode was nominated for a Primetime Emmy Award for Outstanding Children's Program, a category for which the series had been nominated 22 times, with nine wins across the series's 23-year history.

=== Revival ===
On June 23, 2020, Nickelodeon announced it would be reviving Nick News in a series of hour-long specials. The first installment, titled Kids, Race and Unity: A Nick News Special, premiered on June 29 and was hosted by American musician Alicia Keys. Kids, Race and Unity was made in direct response to the wave of protests and unrest following the murder of George Floyd, aiming to "amplify the voices and experiences of Black children across the country". Special guests that appeared on the program included Black Lives Matter co-founders Patrisse Cullors, Alicia Garza, and Opal Tometi; teen activist Marley Dias, founder of the #1000BlackGirlsBook campaign; 12-year-old singer and viral sensation Keedron Bryant; Ibram X. Kendi, author of Antiracist Baby; Teens4Equality founders Jade Fuller, Nya Collins, Zee Thomas, Kennedy Green, Emma Rose Smith and Mikayla Smith; social media star Tabitha Brown and her family; and family therapist, Dr. George James.

In its current iteration, Nickelodeon has partnered with its corporate sibling CBS News on presentation. On October 6, 2020, 60 Minutes veteran Magalie Laguerre-Wilkinson was tapped as executive producer of the Nick News revival and the inaugural vice president of news programming for Nickelodeon. CBS News correspondent Jamie Yuccas serves as the host, while reporters Vladimir Duthiers, Enrique Acevedo, and Imtiaz Tab also contribute. Nick News also appears as interstitials during regular Nickelodeon programming to cover current events.

== Notable episodes ==
In 1993, a then-11-year-old Meghan Markle was featured after writing letters to get a company to change a national television commercial she viewed as sexist.

In 1993, there was an episode on global warming entitled "Plan it for the Planet". On December 9, 2007, Nick News had shown another global warming special entitled "A Global Warning From the Kids of the World". Both specials looked at different regions of the Earth like Australia, Alaska, the Netherlands, the Philippines, California and Kenya, showing the changes in the climate and the effects of those changes. During the later part of the December 9, 2007, episode, Nobel Prize winner Al Gore talked to children about the issues that global warming is causing for ordinary people.

In 2001, Nick News celebrated its 10th anniversary, adds with a special called "Happy Birthday, Nick News". It featured many flashbacks from the first 10 years of Nick News.

On June 18, 2002, Nickelodeon showed "Nick News Special Edition: My Family Is Different". This had one of the largest audiences in Nick News' history. The show featured regular children talking about different issues that have had a major effect on their personal lives, including hate crimes, child abuse and sexual harassment. During this episode, openly lesbian parent Rosie O'Donnell appeared on Nick News to talk with the children and Ellerbee about being different, with other well-known people as well. The show has also included children from households across the globe that oppose LGBT rights, as well as conservative commentator Jerry Falwell.

On October 12, 2008, an episode called "Nickelodeon's Kids Pick the President" featured children from across the United States asking political, economic and health care questions of Democrat Barack Obama and Republican John McCain, as part of a way for American children to choose. Obama was chosen as the winner in that year's Kids Pick the President poll.

Neil Young appeared in an episode in December of 1994 with his son who was diagnosed with autism and their love of model trains.

== Home media ==
=== VHS ===
Title	Release date	Distributor
A Conversation with Magic	1992	Barr Media Group
Stranger Danger	1994	Sony Wonder
Clearing the Air	1995	Sony Wonder
When Bad Things Happen	1995	Sony Wonder

=== DVD ===
Title	Release date	Notes
Under the Influence: Kids of Alcoholics	April 25, 2012	Manufactured on demand on DVD-R

== Social media revival ==
Sometime in 2024, Nick News branded TikTok and Instagram pages were created to post short form informative videos for their audience. The TikTok account uses a pigeon character as a news anchor, while the Instagram account uses real people. The format is the same between both these accounts, having the news be read out by the host while relevant images and videos are displayed (sometimes generated using artificial intelligence).

The TikTok page resembles a more official version of various TikTok pages (that were created unofficially) featuring an artificially generated rendition of Bikini Bottom News (a news show found in universe within the Nick show SpongeBob SquarePants) designed to read and inform people of breaking news in the real world.
