= Vivianne Collins =

Television host

Vivianne Collins is a Canadian American television host known for Filth City (2017), Conviction (2016), and Nickelodeon Robot Wars (2002) and presenting You're On! (1998 - 1999).

== Filmography ==
Year	Title	Role
1998-1999	You're On! (TV Series)	Field Host
2001	Nickelodeon GAS Wildcard (TV Series)	Herself
2002	Cauchemar (Short)	Tahti
2002	Nickelodeon Robot Wars (TV Series)	Herself - Co-Host
2005	The West Wing (TV Series)	Pebble Beach Reporter
2006-2007	The Office (TV Series)	Headquarter Receptionist
2009	Better Living Television (TV Series)	Herself
2011	Being Erica (TV Series)	Mediator
2012	Live Here, Buy This (TV Series)	Herself
2016	Man Seeking Woman (TV Series)	Reporter #2
2016	Conviction (TV Series)	Reporter #1
2017	Degrassi: Next Class (TV Series)	Interviewer
2017	Filth City	GMY Anchor Carla
2017	Filth City (TV Series)	Carla
