= Cable in the Classroom =

Cable television organization designed for schools

- Final logo
- Launched: 1989
- Closed: August 1, 2017 (9 years ago)
- Country of origin: North America
- Original language: English/French (Quebec)/Spanish

The first Cable in the Classroom title card used at the beginning and end of select programs (see list)

Cable in the Classroom was an American division of the National Cable & Telecommunications Association that assisted the cable television industry in providing educational content to schools. The organization was founded in 1989. A Canadian organization, also called "Cable in the Classroom" (in Quebec, "La câblo-éducation" in French), was founded in 1995, and held the same scope as the US organization.

Cable channels broadcast educational television programs at specific times (usually early in the morning) commercial-free and notified Cable in the Classroom as to when the shows would air, which maintained a master list for educators to reference. This way, educators were able to record the programs for free and use them in school as learning tools for children. Copyrights were cleared so that educators could use the content of the listed programs as they wished for their syllabus and learning plans.

10 years later, the organization has helped train approximately 7,500 teachers per year in workshops that demonstrate strategies for teaching with technology. The new Cable in the Classroom Professional Development Institute adds to this commitment by helping to train teachers about basic Internet use and curriculum integration as well as advanced Internet training.

Over the years however, many networks discontinued promoting Cable in the Classroom or stopped using their programming for the organization's purposes, focusing more to direct marketing of their educational television programming to teachers and school districts through their home video departments, their internet sites, or in the cases of networks such as ABC Family, Disney Channel and Cartoon Network, removing their involvement altogether, commensurate with the internet ending other cable services tied to traditional scheduling such as "near video on demand". Another factor was likely the decline in VHS recorders, as DVRs with non-portable storage became the recording format of choice over DVD recorders, the equivalent successor to VCRs. Streaming video also played a factor in the decline of Cable in the Classroom, as educators can now access and play content at any time through computers connected to in-classroom televisions, interactive smartboards, and video projectors, rather than on a set schedule requiring pre-recording of content.

In 2017, Cable in the Classroom was entirely discontinued in the United States with CNN Student News being the last program left under the effort, and the NCTA redirected the former Cable in the Classroom portal to promote their "Cable Impacts Foundation" charity arm instead. The Canadian effort ended as vertically integrated cable and satellite providers purchased networks and campaigned successfully for the CRTC to relax Canadian content restrictions that defined them to schedule programming in a certain manner, including educational programming.

== Programs ==
The following is a list of programs used for "Cable in the Classroom"

- A&E Classroom - A&E
- Al Roker Investigates - truTV
- CNN Student News - CNN/HLN
- Classroom Discovery - Discovery Channel
- Dora the Explorer - Nick Jr.
- History Channel Classroom - History
  - El canal de la historia (Spanish-dubbed programs)
  - Chaîne historique (French-dubbed programs, Quebec only)
- How It's Made - Discovery Channel/Science Channel
- Jep! - Game Show Network
- Kids' Court - Nickelodeon
- Let's Just Play Go Healthy Challenge - Nickelodeon
- Little Einsteins - Disney Jr.
- MTV News specials and documentaries - MTV
- Mr. Wizard's World - Nickelodeon
- Nick News - Nickelodeon
- Nickelodeon Launch Box - Nickelodeon
- Special Agent Oso - Disney Jr.
- The Weather Classroom - The Weather Channel
- Certain episodes of The Twilight Zone – Syfy
- Wheel 2000 - Game Show Network
- This Is America, Charlie Brown - Nickelodeon
- Zap! - Nickelodeon

== See also ==
- Channel One News – first a satellite channel, later an internet streaming video service offering a newscast designed for classroom use
