= BrainSurge =

American children's TV game show

- Genre: Children's game show
- Created by: Scott A. Stone; Clay Newbill
- Directed by: Steve Grant
- Presented by: Jeff Sutphen
- Narrated by: Erin Fitzgerald; John Cramer
- Composer: David Michael Frank
- Country of origin: United States
- Original language: English
- No. of seasons: 3
- No. of episodes: 120 (1 unaired)

Production
- Executive producers: Scott A. Stone; Clay Newbill; David A. Hurwitz
- Producer: Janice Minsburg
- Production locations: Hollywood Center Studios; Hollywood, California
- Camera setup: Videotape; Multi-camera
- Running time: approx. 22–24 minutes
- Production companies: Stone & Company Entertainment; 310 Entertainment; Nickelodeon Productions

Original release
- Network: Nickelodeon (2009–11); Nick at Nite (2011); Nicktoons (2014)
- Release: September 28, 2009 – May 9, 2014

BrainSurge is an American children's game show that aired on Nickelodeon and was hosted by Jeff Sutphen. The show taped its first season in February 2009, and debuted on September 28, 2009. The show's format was adapted from the Japanese game show Brain Survivor The U.S. version was created by Scott A. Stone, co-creator of Legends of the Hidden Temple, and Clay Newbill, executive producer of The Mole.

The network announced on February 18, 2010, that the program was renewed for a second season, consisting of 40 episodes. The second season, which featured one episode held over from season one, premiered on June 21, 2010. The third season started airing on July 18, 2011, on Nick at Nite, marketed as Family BrainSurge, and had a two-person family team format with five teams. The third season ran until November 17, 2011, when the show was canceled. The remaining episodes aired on Nicktoons from April 28 to May 9, 2014.

BrainSurge was taped at Hollywood Center Studios in Hollywood, California.

The series was adapted for Latin American and Brazilian audiences as Veloz Mente, which premiered on Discovery Kids on November 7, 2011.

In 2012, the show was nominated for a Daytime Emmy Award for Outstanding Game Show, but lost to Jeopardy!.

== Format ==
BrainSurge's challenges are designed to test the memory and comprehension skills of its contestants/teams.

=== Level One: Brain Tease ===
The contestants/teams begin by playing a series of visual puzzles. There were 6 (sometimes 5) puzzles in season 1, worth 10, 20, 30, 40, 50, and 100 points each (for a maximum of 250 points); in season 2, the 40-point puzzle was dropped (except in an episode that was delayed from season 1); in season 3 (Family BrainSurge), there are four puzzles, worth 10, 25, 50, and 100 points. Each solution is a number that the players need to enter using their keypads. The contestants/teams have 10 seconds to lock in their answers. The four highest-scoring contestants/teams advance to the next round, while the remaining two contestants/one team is eliminated, but receives a consolation prize and a bucket of slime (the bucket of slime was dropped for Family Brainsurge). Ties are broken by how quickly the contestants/teams entered their answers. In Family Brainsurge, if the teams tied for last place had a score of 0 points, a tiebreaker puzzle is played instead and the team who correctly answers it the fastest will advance. The two eliminated contestants/one team are sent down the "Brain Drain", a slide formed as a human ear containing foam.

=== Level Two: Brain Fart ===
During the second round, the host reads the four remaining contestants/teams a story from "Jeff's Big Book of Super Fantastic True Chronicles of Truth, That are Absolutely True". After the story, the contestants/teams are given questions based on the story. Contestants/teams lock in their answers by sitting down on a chair. If the contestant/team gets a question right, a ding sound is heard. If the contestant/team gets a question wrong (or if they fail to answer), the chair makes a farting noise, and the contestant/team is pulled backwards through the paper "tooth" (curtains in Season 2 or later) of a large face (made to resemble host Sutphen) and eliminated from further play. This continues until two contestants/teams remain. In Family BrainSurge, each team is allowed one "Brain Fart", which allows two other members of the family (the "Brain Trust") to offer an answer for the team; the team stays in the game or is eliminated based on that answer. There were two types of questions used in Level 2. One type involved who, what, where, when, why, and how type questions about events in the story (in this type, if a question is missed the next player/team will be asked the same question, but sometimes a new question in season 1) and the other type involved players/teams naming things that Jeff listed in the story (e.g. name the musical instruments mentioned in the story) and in this type repeating an already said answer, including another form of that answer, counted as a wrong answer. In Family BrainSurge, if all the answers in the naming type questions are used up before two teams are eliminated, then Jeff will ask tiebreaker questions using who, what, and where type questions and teams cannot use their Brain Farts during a tiebreaker (any unused Brain Farts are out of play when the tiebreaker starts).

=== Knockout round ===
In the knockout round, the two remaining contestants/teams have ten seconds to memorize a grid of 16 numbers containing 8 pairs of images from the story. The two contestants/teams then take turns matching pairs of images from the story. If any of the 2 contestants/teams makes a mistake, the game will go to sudden death; whoever makes a match wins the game and moves on. At this point, the losing contestant/team's chair does the same thing as if a question is wrong. The contestant/team that lost in this round and the two eliminated contestants/teams who got a question wrong from Level 2 all receive a consolation prize. The three eliminated contestants/teams then are sent down the Brain Drain.

Although there's no footage of the knockout round getting completed (the closest being down to 2 pairs left), it was revealed in an interview with Jeff that a lot of contestants cleared the knockout round but the footage was edited out and never shown. The board was reset until someone made a mistake and was knocked out.

=== Level Three: Brain Trip (The Final Stage) ===
For the bonus round, the contestant must successfully trace out three paths on grids within 90 seconds. The first path consists of six squares on a 4×4 grid, the second is eight squares on a 5×5 grid, and the third is ten squares on a 6×6 grid, with occasional variation in the 4×4 and 5×5 grids. Every square in the path is adjacent to the previous one (horizontally, vertically, or diagonally). Each square has an actuator in the middle that must be stepped on to activate the square. Contestants see each path twice; the clock starts running when the contestant first activates a square. Upon completing a path successfully, the contestant must step on an actuator outside the board to stop the clock, which is timed to 1/100 of a second. If the contestant makes a mistake, they are told immediately and must return to the start and view the pattern again before being allowed to continue; when the contestant views the pattern after a mistake, the clock continues to run. On Family BrainSurge, the child attempted the 4×4 and 6×6 grids while the adult did the 5×5 grid, and the rest of the team (including the "Brain Trust") was allowed to help guide the contestant. The contestant can win three prizes, one for completing each of the three paths, with the grand prize usually being a trip; any prizes they win on one stage are theirs to keep, regardless of the outcome. If time runs out, the contestant must go down the Brain Drain, but still keep the prizes they won, while the contestant/team who succeed before time runs out get slimed of a lifetime, in network tradition. Also, on Family BrainSurge, before the level starts, the episode's winning team also got a donation made by the show's staff in their name to one of Nickelodeon's "Big Help" partner organizations. At the end of each episode, Jeff signs off by saying "Thanks for watching, Mayfield, New York!" (which is Jeff's hometown).

== Specials ==
=== Girls vs. Boys ===
During the first week of the second season, the audience was divided into two sections, each with a group of a different gender. In each episode, male contestants wore green and female contestants wore purple. If a male contestant won, male audience members received a green BrainSurge T-shirt. If a female contestant won, female audience members received a purple BrainSurge T-shirt.

=== Celebrity Episode ===
Each season has at least 2 episodes featuring celebrity players, at least one of which had Nickelodeon stars as players. In the season 1 and 2 celebrity episodes, the Nick stars played and the winner played to win prizes and the sliming for a lucky audience member. The season 2 Nick star episodes featured the stars representing their show in teams (either 3 teams of 2, or 2 teams of 3), even though each player wore a different color. Losing the bonus round meant that the celebrity had to go down the Brain Drain (in season 1, the audience member also went down the brain drain with the celebrity, while in season 2, it is just the celebrity while the audience member is standing with Jeff). On Family BrainSurge, the Nick stars won prizes for their Brain Trusts in the audience (fans of the show each team was representing). There were also two Family BrainSurge episodes with celebrities and their families playing to win prizes for themselves and a donation to a favorite charity. There was also an episode with teams consisting of a child paired up with a WWE star. The team eliminated in the first round receives $1,000 for their charity, while the two teams that are eliminated in the second receive $1,500 for their charity. In the WWE special, the amount was changed to $2,500 for their charity. The person who loses the knockout round gets $3,000 for their charity. In the WWE special, it was changed to $4,000, and the winning team gets $5,000 for their charity. The kids receive prizes, while the wrestlers receive cash to donate to the Make-A-Wish Foundation. Unlike the other contestants, the wrestlers wore whatever they wanted, rather than the BrainSurge shirts usually worn by every contestant.

=== Co-Host Week ===
One week during season 2 featured Jeff hosting with a celebrity co-host by his side. The round one puzzles and the round two story usually contained references to that episode's co-host (mainly about what they're famous for). Also, during those episodes, if the player lost the final round, the co-host would go down the Brain Drain with the player. Likewise, if the player won the final round, the co-host would get slimed with the player. During the 1st level, the co-host would join Jeff on the brain screen. During the 2nd level and the knockout round, the co-host would be in the audience rather than joining Jeff, and during level 3 the co-host would join Jeff. The co-hosts were:

- Natalie Coughlin
- Tony Hawk
- Tom Kenny
- Misty May-Treanor
- Jordin Sparks

=== Family Week ===
During the last week of season 2, there were pairs of related players competing, but the game was still played with the usual rules. Related players wore the same color shirt. Two episodes had 3 pairs of siblings playing individually, while another 2 episodes had the same configuration, but with 3 pairs of twins. On the sibling and twins episodes, the winners' sibling or twin would wish them luck via video before starting the bonus round. One episode that week had 6 parent-child teams playing, similar to Family BrainSurge, and during the bonus round, the child did the 4x4 and the 6x6, while the parent did the 5x5. However, unlike Family BrainSurge, there is no "Brain Trust" and no option for them to ask for an answer in round 2.

== Broadcast ==
The show premiered on September 28, 2009, on Nickelodeon. The network announced on February 18, 2010, that the program was renewed for a second season, consisting of 40 episodes. The second season, which featured one episode held over from season one, premiered on June 21, 2010. The third season started airing on July 18, 2011, on Nick at Nite, marketed as Family BrainSurge, and had a two-person family team format with five teams. The third season ran until November 17, 2011, when the show was canceled. The remaining episodes aired on Nicktoons from April 28 to May 9, 2014. Only the first episode was left unaired for unknown reasons.

Currently as of 2025, the show has not been shown on television since its last broadcast on Nicktoons on August 1, 2014. The show is also not on any streaming services, especially Paramount+.
