= Slime Time Live =

American television series

- Genre: Game show Interstitial television
- Created by: Niels Schuurmans; Richard Barry
- Written by: Jason Harper; Scott Bennett
- Directed by: Jason Harper
- Presented by: Dave Aizer; Jonah Travick; Jessica Holmes
- Country of origin: United States
- No. of seasons: 8

Production
- Executive producers: Kevin Weist; Richard Barry
- Producer: Jason Harper
- Production locations: Nickelodeon Studios; Universal Studios Florida; Orlando, Florida
- Running time: 120 minutes

Original release
- Network: Nickelodeon
- Release: January 24, 2000 – July 2, 2004

Related
- Nick in the Afternoon; U-Pick Live; Nickelodeon Splat!

Slime Time Live is an American television program that aired on Nickelodeon from 2000 to 2004, lasting for eight seasons. During its run, it was hosted by Dave Aizer, Jonah Travick, and Jessica Holmes, and was produced and directed by Jason Harper. The show was taped both outdoors and indoors at Nickelodeon Studios in Universal Studios Florida; indoor tapings were used when weather conditions did not permit outdoor filming or when the outdoor area was occupied earlier in the day. It was one of the last programs to be produced at Nickelodeon Studios and primarily aired as filler during regular commercial breaks.

The show holds two Guinness World Records: one for the most people pied in three minutes (1,000 in 2001) and another for the most people slimed (762 during the series finale). The sliming event took place outdoors in front of the studios.

== Premise ==
The show's hosts were known for "sliming" members of the audience. During these segments, a participant would be selected, seated in a chair, and asked a question. If the participant answered correctly, a bucket of slime would be poured over them. The segment later evolved to include two and eventually three buckets of slime.

The show was also known for featuring audience members, contestants, hosts, celebrity guests, and staff being caught on camera getting pied in the face. Following the show's cancellation, Nickelodeon largely retired the pieing gimmick from its programming. It was later revived through the Nickelodeon Suites Resort and Nickelodeon-themed cruise lines.

=== Interactive games ===
During the show, viewers would call in to play interactive games with contestants on the program. The most common game involved matching Nicktoons characters on a tic-tac-toe grid. The board was scrambled before gameplay, and if a match was made, the home player won a prize while the contestant was slimed and often pied as well.

If no match was made, host Dave Aizer would receive a whipped cream pie in the face. Later, when the mystery bucket was introduced, only the mystery bucket would drop on the player if no match was made.

In addition to Nicktoons, the board included a pie tile (where the contestant would shove the pie they were holding into their own face), a "cream blaster" tile (where the contestant would be blasted with whipped cream from two side cannons), a bonus tile (which gave the home player another turn), and an "instant slime" tile or wild card (which triggered an automatic match, an instant sliming, and an instant win).

Additional interactive games were introduced as the series progressed. Celebrities from other Nickelodeon shows also made frequent appearances.

== Broadcast history ==
=== 2000 ===
Slime Time Live initially aired from 4–5pm, leading up to new episodes of Double Dare 2000. On May 2, 2000, the show was expanded into a 2.5-hour programming block, airing between shows and commercials from 4–6:30 pm weekdays. This initial season lasted until June 30, 2000. The second season premiered on September 4, 2000 and lasted until November 22, 2000. Longstanding traditions like the birthday pie in the face became cemented in place this season.

The Super Sloppy Slime-Off was the last game played at the end of some episodes. In it, two out of three teams (each team had three contestants), Jessica led one team and Jonah led the other, would stand under a trough filled with slime. Dave would ask a Nickelodeon-related question, if one of the in-house players answered the question, one of the contestants from the home player's team would be pied by their team leader, if they answered wrong, a contestant from the opposing team would be pied by their team leader. The team to have all three of their members pied would be slimed and (along with the home player) receive a grand prize.

=== 2001 ===
The third season premiered on January 1, 2001 and lasted until June 15, 2001. Starting on February 5, 2001, BubbleCast would be aggressively promoted. This was an online interactive platform, which prompted viewers to constantly engage with the Nick.com website while watching shows. BubbleCast was removed from the broadcast on March 30, 2001, but BubbleCast would promote themselves during Taina and the TEENick block starting in August 2001. Jonah and Jessica assume more prominent roles this season. It also aired special editions like Slime Time SNICK Live which aired on March 10, 2001 and March 17, 2001.

The fourth season premiered on September 3, 2001 and lasted until December 21, 2001. There was no Slime Time Live during the following week due to the 9/11 attacks. This season saw a number of changes. In Mondays throughout November 2001, STL would visit different schools, where they hosted Slime Time Takes Over Your School. Also in 2001, a feature called Head-to-Head Friday was played, which involved competitions to determine which of two shows would air, with the audience divided into two teams, and often taking part in competitions.

=== 2002 ===
The fifth season premiered on January 7, 2002 and lasted until May 24, 2002. Starting on January 21, 2002, the Slime-U-Lator was revamped to include three barrels: two containing slime, and a third as the "mystery bucket," containing a surprise filter that was often voted for online. If the player won the game, their studio teammate would be slimed with all three buckets. If they lost, their teammate would only get the mystery bucket dumped on them. The NickVentures segment was introduced, which involved Jonah traveling across the country to find out what children liked to do after school. This segment would usually introduce the filter used for the upcoming Slime-U-Lator round.

Also in 2002, the Super Sloppy Slime-Off was renamed "The Big Shaboozie". Changes to the game included Dave asking Nickelodeon-related questions on the given topic (instead of random questions); all players would now wear goggles during the game (whether it was getting pied or slimed) in addition to getting slimed (they often got slimed with other substances besides that), the members of the winning team would be blasted (front and back) with whipped cream. The Big Shaboozie finale involved a large tic tac toe-style game board with nine numbers. In turn, teams could use their accrued points to pick numbers on the game board, in hopes of finding the winning square, "The Big Shaboozie". If players found "The Whammy" square, then the opposing team automatically won the game.

The sixth season premiered on September 2, 2002 and lasted until November 27, 2002. This season saw some radical changes to the show and its format, starting with the schedule, which now became a three-hour block from 2–5 p.m. It also aired special editions like Slime Time Live in Hypertime which aired on April 6, 2002 and a "Hey, I Wanna Be Arnold! Slime Time Movie Special" which aired on June 15, 2002 and June 22, 2002.

=== 2003 ===
The seventh season premiered on January 6, 2003 and lasted until May 23, 2003. In this season, the show was downgraded to two hours, airing from 3–5pm.

This time, there were only two players on each team. Each team took turns deciding which number to pick on a Tic-Tac-Toe board, if one team finds "The Big Shaboozie" they would win the game, but if they find "The Whammy," the opposing team wins. The Splat Vat was introduced, which was a kind of dunk tank, used for various games with audience members and hosts. There was a call-in segment that ran similarly to the Slime-U-Lator rounds of previous series. Teams for The Big Shaboozie now wore orange and light blue, a change from the red and blue of the previous seasons. The Big Shaboozie was played in a similar way to the first few seasons, home players on the phone competing for their team in studio. This season, questions are asked in a "this-or-that" format, players might have to decide whether an item is "Desert" or "Dessert." Hosts would alternate each show. At the start of The Big Shaboozie, the host would bank on a team they thought would win. If they chose the wrong team, they would be dropped into the Splat Vat after the winning team was slimed.

From August 4, 2003 through August 29, 2003, Nickelodeon aired a summer edition of Slime Time Live titled Summer Slime Live, hosted by Dave Aizer, Jonah Travick, Jessica Holmes, Brent Popolizio and Candace Bailey. Nickelodeon stars often appeared as co-hosts.

=== Final season ===
The final season premiered on September 22, 2003 and lasted until July 2, 2004. The final year saw a number of significant changes to format and scheduling. Starting October 20, 2003, the show began recording prior to the days it was set to air, and aired in a 7am morning slot. Nickelodeon had tried to gain young viewers in that time through this, but ratings declined shortly thereafter. The show would often "connect" (Florida to New York) with U-Pick Live, which would replace it later in the year. On November 26, 2003, the show broke the world record for most people slimed at one time.

=== Friday Night Slimetime ===
One year after the show's cancellation, Friday Night Slimetime premiered on Nickelodeon, but unlike the original version, its segments were prerecorded. It lasted for two back to back seasons and was hosted by Lil' JJ and Chloe Dolandis (who had previously co-hosted Splat!). Nickelodeon had a talent hold on Lil' JJ and was forced to give him a show to finish out his contract. Because of this, Dave Aizer worked as a writer and also occasionally announced the prizes. The most common prizes on it were either a bicycle or athletic balls. This ran from September 23, 2005 to March 24, 2006.

== Celebrity guest appearances ==
- Aaron Carter
- A-Teens
- B*Witched
- Jason Harris
- The Spy Kids (Alexa PenaVega and Daryl Sabara)
- LFO
- O Town
- Michelle Branch
- Amanda Bynes
- Anthony Anderson
- Gary Dell'Abate
- Mick Foley
- Nick Cannon
- David Lynch
- Frankie Muniz
- Kenan Thompson
- Kel Mitchell
- Lori Beth Denberg
- Lil Romeo
- Dana Carvey
- David Arquette
- Drake Bell
- Josh Peck
- Miranda Cosgrove
- Christina Vidal
- Lil Bow Wow
- Jason Acuña
- Howie Dorough
- Randy Savage
- Jamie Lynn Spears
- Lemony Snicket
- Billy Gilman
- 3LW
- Dream
- Lance Bass
- Tiktak
- Plus One
- Stevie Brock
- Chris Kirkpatrick
- Jump5
- American Juniors
- No Secrets
- Dream Street
- Play
- Tom Kenny (As Patchy the Pirate)
