= Phil Moore (actor) =

American television host, writer, producer, and comedian

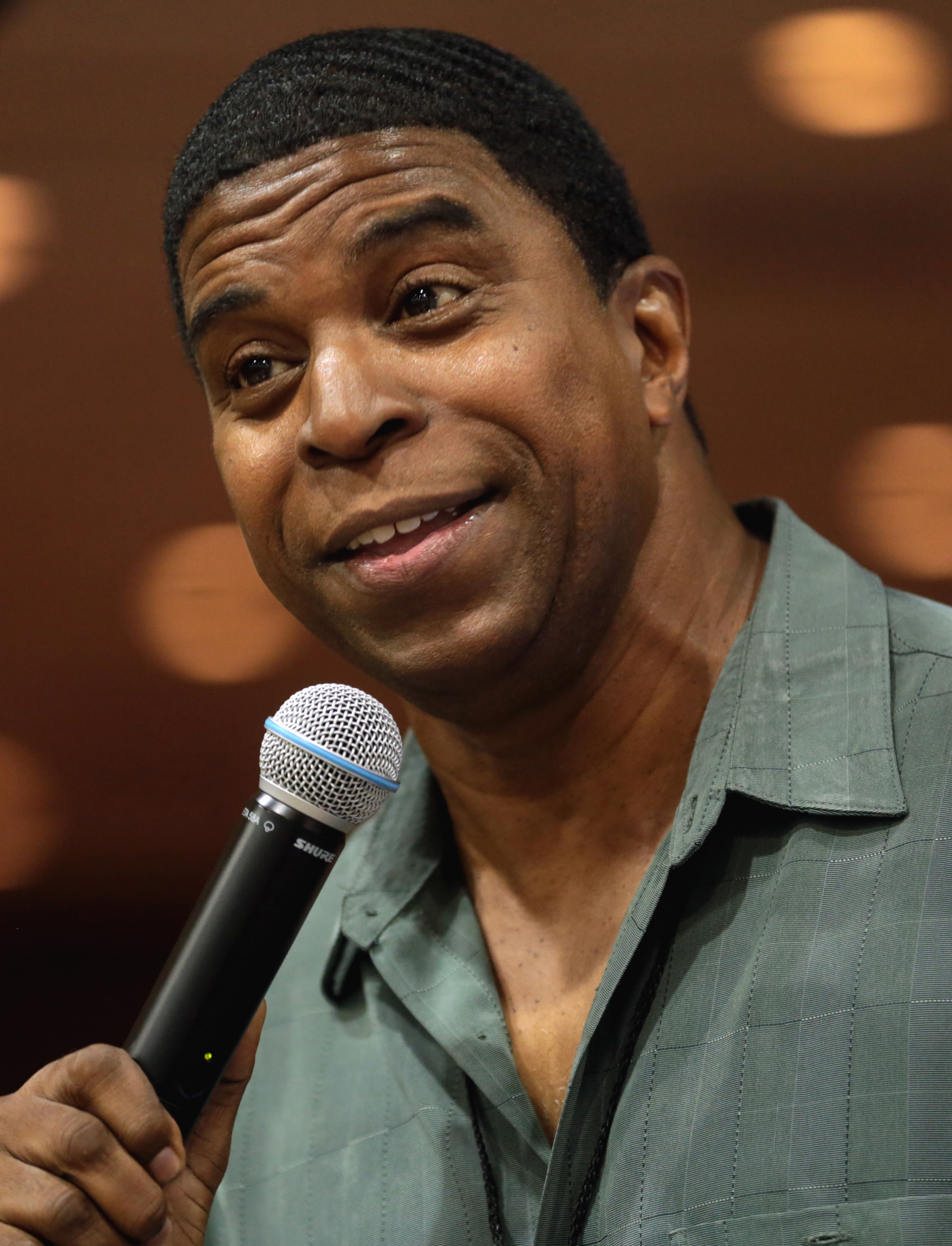
- Moore at the 2017 Game On Expo
- Born: August 24, 1961 (age 64); Baltimore, Maryland
- Occupations: Host, producer, writer, comedian
- Years active: 1986–present

Phil Moore (born August 24, 1961) is an American television host, writer, producer, and comedian best known as the host of the Nickelodeon game shows Nick Arcade and You're On! .

== Early life and career ==
Born and raised in Baltimore, Maryland, Moore attended Baltimore Polytechnic Institute, a magnet school. He attended Embry-Riddle Aeronautical University in Daytona Beach, Florida, and, after college, moved to Orlando, where he took a job at AT&T. During college, friends told him to do a local open mic night, which led him to do more standup and audience warm-up work for television shows.

He performed at comedy clubs in New York and Los Angeles, and appeared as an opener on shows such as The Mickey Mouse Club and America's Funniest People.

He temporarily moved to New York City to work behind the scenes on MTV's Remote Control, then moved back to Orlando to be with his wife and newborn son. While doing warmup work for Dick Clark on Let's Make A Deal, he was invited to audition for Nick Arcade.

After leaving Nickelodeon, Moore worked mainly behind the scenes as a writer and producer on a variety of programs.

Moore lives with his family in Los Angeles.

== Awards and nominations ==
Year	Award	Work	Result
2020	Daytime Emmy Award for Outstanding Pre-School Children's Series	Ryan's Mystery Playdate	Nominated
2002	Emmy Award for Best Host/Interviewer	Aqua Kids	Won
2002	Videographer's Creativity Award	Aqua Kids	Won

== Filmography ==
Year	Title	Role	Notes		
1988	After School	Basketball Player #2	Drama film		
1992–97	Nick Arcade	Himself; host	Game show		
1993	Weinerville	Himself	1 episode, Variety Show or Sitcom		
1993	What Would You Do?	Himself	1 episode, Game show		
1994	All That	Himself	Guest appearance on the pilot episode		
1994	Nickelodeon All-Star Challenge	Himself	2 episodes, Game show		
1995	1995 Kids' Choice Awards	Himself	Awards show		
1997	Rosewood	Aaron Carrier	Film		
1997–99	Figure It Out	Himself	Panelist		
1998	Malcolm & Eddie	Nelson Carter	1 episode, Bachelor Daze		
1998–99	You're On!	Himself; host	Game show		
2000–05	Aqua Kids	Himself; host			
2002	30 Seconds to Fame	Writer	Reality-TV		
2004	X-Play	Segment producer	Talk-Show		
2004-2008	How Do I Look?	Writer	Reality-TV	Seasons 1-7	
2005	Exposed: 25 Most Notorious Moments of Fashion Week	Writer	History		
2008-2010	Clean House Comes Clean	Story producer	Reality-TV		
2012	Showhouse Showdown	Story producer	Reality-TV		
2013	Let's Ask America	Writer	Season 2 Game Show		
2014	Dr. Luciana Show: Aging and Falling	Cinematographer	Talk Show		
2015	Crowded House	Himself	1 episode, Reality-TV		
2015	The Xperiment	Story producer	Season 1, Comedy		
2015	TMI Hollywood	Host / Various	Comedy		
2016–present	Let's Make A Deal Live Tour	Himself; announcer/co-host			
2016, 2018	Robot Chicken	Himself	2 episodes		
2017	On Your Marc	Himself	Documentary		
2018	The Orange Years: The Nickelodeon Story	Himself	Documentary		
2019	Drop That Seat	Challenge producer	Game-Show		
2019-2020	Ryan's Mystery Playdate	Sr, Challenge producer		Wrapping Rapper ("Ryan's Merry Playdate"); Veloci-Rapper ("Ryan's Prehistoric Playdate"); Cap'n Rappin ("Ryan's Swashbucklin' Playdate")	Seasons 1, 2 & 3 [Emmy nominated, season 3]
2020	Dare Package	Challenge producer	Season 1		
2020	Chasing the Crown: Dreamers to Streamers	Sr, Challenge producer	8 episodes		
2021	Tooned In	Producer	Game Show		
2021	The Wheel	Challenge Producer	Game Show		
2021	Love Island USA, season 3	Challenge Producer	Reality competition show		
2021	Celebrity Game Face, season 3	Challenge Producer	Comedy game show		
2022	Exposure, season 2	Sr, Challenge Producer	Reality competition show		
2022	Mr. Beast	Content Creator/Producer			
2022	Celebrity Game Face, season 4	Challenge Producer	Comedy game show		
