= Total Panic =

- Also known as: Nickelodeon's Total Panic
- Genre: Variety show
- Created by: Geoffrey Darby; Andy Bamberger
- Developed by: Debby Beece; Michael Klinghoffer; Herb Scannell; Nina Silvestri
- Written by: Tracy S. Burroughs
- Directed by: Andy Bamberger
- Starring: Greg Lee; Molly Scott; Keith Diamond
- Narrated by: Tracy S. Burroughs
- Theme music composer: John Terelle
- Composers: Mark Schultz; Daniel S. Vitco
- Country of origin: United States
- Original language: English

Production
- Executive producer: Geoffrey Darby
- Producers: Andy Bamberger; James Bethea (segment producer)
- Production locations: New York City; Orlando, Florida
- Camera setup: Multi-camera
- Running time: 120 minutes
- Production company: Nickelodeon Studios

Original release
- Network: Nickelodeon
- Release: April 1, 1989 – September 30, 1990

Related
- Rated K: For Kids by Kids; Nick Rocks; Nick Arcade; Outta Here!

Total Panic is an American television variety series that aired on the cable network Nickelodeon from 1989–1990. The show's working title was going to be Pandemonium before it was determined that the word "Pandemonium" seemed too big and complicated for Nickelodeon's target audience.

== Hosts ==
The show was initially hosted by Molly Scott and Keith Diamond, who was on through July 1989 at the latest. Diamond would ultimately be replaced by Greg Lee, who had previously served as a warm-up comedian for Total Panic. After Total Panic ended its run in 1990, he stayed on Nickelodeon to be an announcer for another show, Outta Here!, which ran through 1991.

== Format ==
Initially running for three hours on Sunday mornings, Total Panic did not have a set format week in or week out.

The show did however at is core, encourage audience participation. For example, Total Panic often invited its young audience members to compete in trivia games or Double Dare-esque physical challenges for prizes. One notable game was "Eat-a-Bug", in which the contestants would stand in front of a chroma key screen and attempt catch with their hands, animated flies, wasps, or ladybugs all the while, trying to avoid giant spiders or bumblebees. "Eat-a-Bug" was designed by Dean Friedman and served as a prototype for the series Nick Arcade, for which Friedman produced a dozen games.

Other recurring segments included previews and reviews of upcoming fourth generation video games and films, celebrity interviews, music videos, cartoons shorts such as Bananaman, and comedy skits.

There was also a segment called "Road Trip", where Total Panic would dispatch a young correspondent to a locale or event. For instance, one episode featured a road trip to the Boston Museum of Science. Another episode featured Full House star Candace Cameron visiting a Macy's in New York City to help demonstrate chroma key effects in front of a blue screen. One segment featured Jason Hervey of The Wonder Years visiting Magic Mountain to ride the roller coaster known as Ninja.

The format of Total Panic was arguably similar to that of Wonderama, which originally appeared on the Metromedia-owned stations from 1955 to 1977. Andy Edelstein in the March 26, 1989 edition of Newsday himself, alluded to the apparent similarities.

=== Music videos ===
Total Panic for all intents and purposes, replaced Nick Rocks, which aired on the network from 1984 to 1989, as Nickelodeon's primary outlet to showcase music videos. Incidentally, Total Panic premiered approximately a week after the final episode of Nick Rocks was aired.

Among the videos that were aired on Total Panic was Bobby Brown's "On Our Own", which soundly beat out "Eardrum Buzz" by Wire. Another segment hosted by Greg Lee pitted "Shaking the Tree" by Peter Gabriel and Youssou N'Dour against "Let's Go Round There" by The Darling Buds, for which "Let's Go Around There" wound up winning. The studio audience would in this regard, be asked to use their applause intensity as a means of selecting which music video they would want to see the most in its entirety.

=== Film reviews ===
Besides filling the void that Nick Rocks left upon its cancelation in 1989, Total Panic reconfigured Rated K: For Kids by Kids, which broadcast its final episode in December 1988, into a segment for its show. So in effect, just like how Total Panic replaced Nick Rocks as the resident program for music videos on Nickelodeon, it also suddenly became the network's primary outlet for film reviews. The Rated K segment on Total Panic was hosted by Molly Scott.

Among the films spotlighted in this time frame were Eddie and the Cruisers II: Eddie Lives! (including an interview with its star Michael Paré) and the Tom Hanks vehicle Turner & Hooch. Scott would invite at least two members of the studio audience to share their own thoughts on the films. The film review segments on Total Panic actually used the second generation set from Rated K, which was a movie concession stand with a pastel color palette.

=== Guests ===
Notable guests to appear on Total Panic included news journalist Walter Cronkite, musician "Weird Al" Yankovic and his castmates from the film UHF, Victoria Jackson and Michael Richards, professional wrestler Hulk Hogan, former New York City mayor Ed Koch, comic book writer and artist Walt Simonson, notable pinball player, designer, and promoter Roger Sharpe and illusionist Mark O'Brien.

Jason Marsden meanwhile, was once interviewed by Molly Scott while in costume as Eddie Munster on the set of The Munsters Today. Also interviewed by Scott were Marsden's co-stars, Hilary Van Dyke (Marilyn Munster), Lee Meriwether (Lily Munster), and Howard Morton ("Grandpa" Vladimir Dracula).

Also invited for a segment was Andy Eddy, the then editor of VideoGames & Computer Entertainment, to discuss the then new TurboGrafx-16, Sega Genesis, Game Boy, and Atari Lynx consoles.

== Production ==
Total Panic officially debuted on April 1, 1989, which was also the tenth anniversary of Nickelodeon's launch. Total Panic was produced by Andy Bamberger, who also produced Nick Rocks and Rated K: For Kids by Kids for the network. By July 1989, Total Panic would shorten its run time from three hours to two. And come September 1989, Nickelodeon would begin broadcasting a two hour long "best of" clip program on the Saturday before the first-run broadcasts the following day.

In March 1990, Total Panic would relocate from its studios in New York City to Stage 20 of Nickelodeon Studios in Orlando, Florida. At the time, Nickelodeon Studios was still under construction and wouldn't formally open until June 7, 1990. Before Total Panic's move to Orlando, Think Fast and Double Dare had already set up shop there.

== See also ==
- List of programs broadcast by Nickelodeon
