= Rated K: For Kids by Kids =

- Genre: Movie review
- Created by: Debby Beece
- Developed by: Andy Bamberger
- Presented by: Lakmini Besbroda; Kimani Bethea; Eben Davidson; Kirk Gibbons; Robyn Griggs; Brad Kane; Alek Lev; Stefanie Marco; Colin Martin; Matt Nespole; Jennifer Rosa; Jeremy Ryan; Joel Savani; Rebecca Schwager; Mark Shanahan
- Theme music composer: Peter and Jennifer Fish
- Composers: Tom Pomposello; Jeff Thurman
- Country of origin: United States
- Original language: English

Production
- Executive producer: Geoffrey Darby
- Producers: Andy Bamberger; Marcia Ely; Carol Levitt
- Production location: New York City
- Editors: David Leveen; Eric Singer
- Camera setup: Multi-camera
- Running time: 26 minutes

Original release
- Network: Nickelodeon
- Release: November 1, 1986 – December 18, 1988

Related
- Total Panic

Rated K: For Kids by Kids is an American movie review television program that ran on the cable network Nickelodeon from 1986–1988.

== Format ==
Each week, the show would feature a rotating blend of three young teenagers giving their opinions on the latest feature films and sometimes, what was new on home video. Each review was capped by an otherwise inconsistent letter grade system (for example A for Amazing, C for Classic, Confusing, or Crazy, G for Go, S for See It or So-So, and T for Terrific) with Letter K being that show's equivalent to an ultimate, perfect 5- or 4-star scale.

The three hosts would sit together on at a small blue table on a curved pink couch with white printed stars. While the introductions that summarized the films were scripted, the on-air reviews themselves were completely improvised. This usually resulted in a lot of playful teasing and ribbing between the hosts. The original hosts were Matt Nespole, Lakmini Besbroda, Mark Shanahan, and Rebecca Schwager. Other first wave hosts included Jennifer Rosa, Kimani Bethea, and Eben David.

Because of the show's target demographic by nature of it airing on Nickelodeon and the ages and young perspective of the hosts themselves, very rarely did Rated K: For Kids by Kids feature R-rated movies. The show would usually only feature an R-rated movie if it was in some way deemed relevant to the young audience, such as 1986's Stand by Me, which was about four young boys who go on a days-long hike to find a dead body. Other times, the show would review movies that while weren't R-rated, would nonetheless, not immediately be considered desirable or appealing to the show's young demographic. For example, the 1986 Jack Lemmon-Julie Andrews middle-aged drama That's Life! was reviewed on Rated K: For Kids by Kids.

At times, if there were not enough age appropriate movies to review for the week, the hosts would resort to discussing older features that were already out on VHS. One episode featured a segment discussing the works of Alfred Hitchcock. Another featured an on-set interview with Roger Ebert and Gene Siskel.

=== The Big Ballot ===
For the next four weeks beginning on March 28, 1987, the Rated K cast presented the results of a nationwide poll conducted by Nickelodeon that asked kids what their favorites in film, television, popular music, and sports from the past year were. Thus, came "The Big Ballot", which was a pre-produced program where ballots for the show's awards were cast via mail, and then the winners would tape a thank you video that was shown during the program. These videos were introduced, and broken up by "link" segments, featuring the Rated K cast. The Big Ballot was sponsored by Bonkers fruit chews and Post Cereal.

One year later, Nickelodeon would take the basic concept of The Big Ballot, and reconfigure it into what is now known as the Kids' Choice Awards. Unlike The Big Ballot, which was a pre-produced program produced at the Rated K studio in New York City, the Kids' Choice Awards was a televised live event. Also, unlike winners receiving an Orange Blimp Award at the Kids' Choice Awards (which technically, wasn't introduced until 1990), the trophy that winners received for The Big Ballot was a golden teleidoscope.

Nickelodeon has never officially considered The Big Ballot to be the first ever Kids' Choice Awards event. As previously mentioned, unlike Kids' Choice Awards, which was a live, prime-time singular event, The Big Ballot took place over the course of four weeks from March 28 – April 18, 1987. During this time span, Rated K: For Kids by Kids still reviewed movies (like the Bruce Willis-Kim Basinger comedy Blind Date) at the start of the episodes before going into a segment on The Big Ballot.

=== Later episodes ===
Going into 1988, the respective cancellations of Nickelodeon's celebrity and music interview-talk show Livewire and the Leonard Nimoy hosted movie behind-the-scenes program Standby...Lights! Camera! Action! from the past two years, consequently resulted in a dramatic shift regarding Rated K's role on the channel. With Rated K now left as Nickelodeon's sole modern multi-media program, the channel decided that now would be the perfect time to broaden the show's focus and revamp its overall look and presentation.

For starters, Nickelodeon decided to replace Matt Nespole, Lakmini Besbroda, Mark Shanahan, and Rebecca Schwager (who were admittedly by this point, aging out of their roles on the show) with Stefanie Marco, Jeremy Ryan, Kirk Gibbons, Robyn Griggs, Joel Savani, Alek Lev, and Brad Kane.

The new hosts were each given a designated role. For example, movie reviews were now handled by only two critics, Robyn Griggs and Joel Savani. Brad Kane meanwhile, hosted the Rated K Update. In these short segments (that usually ran during commercial breaks or during longer shows), Kane interviewed famous young people and discussed topics in entertainment and politics in a fun way that was designed to appeal to children. Among the people that Kane interviewed were Alyssa Milano, Chad Allen, and Carrie Fisher.

The sets were also completely overhauled to resembling a movie concession stand with a pastel color palette. And unlike the more unpolished and improvised presentation of the first year and a half of Rated K, the show by 1988 took on a more scripted form.

Besides movie reviews, Rated K now also did more extensive behind the scenes features, and started spotlighting other children's media such as video games and theme park attractions. Rated K also got age appropriate celebrities to do on-scene reporting like Wil Wheaton going to Universal Studios Hollywood to talk about the Star Trek Adventure attraction.

In an effect, the revamped version of Rated K: For Kids by Kids bore a closer resemblance to a television newsmagazine like Entertainment Tonight than At the Movies. This iteration of Rated K would last through its final broadcast on December 18, 1988.

=== Aftermath ===
On April 1, 1989 (coincidentally, the network's 10th anniversary), Nickelodeon premiered a three hour long variety series called Total Panic. Total Panic reconfigured Rated K: For Kids by Kids into a segment for its show. The Rated K segment on Total Panic was hosted by Molly Scott.

Among the films spotlighted in this time frame were Eddie and the Cruisers II: Eddie Lives! (including an interview with its star Michael Paré) and the Tom Hanks vehicle Turner & Hooch. Scott would invite at least two members of the studio audience to share their own thoughts on the films. The film review segments on Total Panic actually used the second generation set from Rated K, which was a movie concession stand with a pastel color palette.

== See also ==
- List of programs broadcast by Nickelodeon
