= Outta Here! =

- Genre: Game show Variety show
- Created by: Geoffrey Darby; Kristin Martin; David Potorti; Herb Scannell
- Written by: Ned Rice; Liz Rosen
- Directed by: Scott Fishman
- Starring: Mike Daniels; Kareen Germain; Tiffany Hunter; Bruce Klassen
- Narrated by: Greg Lee
- Composer: Dan Vitco
- Country of origin: United States
- Original language: English
- No. of seasons: 1
- No. of episodes: 78

Production
- Executive producers: Andy Bamberger; Geoffrey Darby; Kristin Martin
- Producer: David Potorti
- Production location: Orlando, Florida
- Editors: Keith Bozarth; Nick Fernandes
- Camera setup: Multi-camera
- Running time: 30 minutes

Original release
- Network: Nickelodeon
- Release: August 13, 1990 – January 4, 1991

Related
- Total Panic

Outta Here! is an American variety and game show that aired on the cable network Nickelodeon from August 13, 1990 – January 4, 1991. The series was produced at Stage 18 at Nickelodeon Studios in Orlando, Florida. It was the first series to be exclusively produced at Nickelodeon Studios. The theme music would later be reused for the pilot of Nick Arcade.

== Hosts and format ==
Outta Here! was hosted by Mike Daniels, Kareen Germain, Tiffany Hunter, and Bruce Klassen. While members of the young studio audience would be selected to partake in an assortment of silly and wacky games and trivia challenges, two of the hosts would be selected to each serve as team captains. The two teams would wear sun-caps that were either green or purple in color. The other two hosts who weren't selected to captain would either emcee the show or provide play-by-play for the game competition at Universal Studios Florida.

In-between, Outta Here! also had segments that discussed the latest trends and news pertaining to fashion, music, or movies. Among the guests that were interviewed were New Kids on the Block.

Greg Lee, who was a co-host on Total Panic, the series that Outta Here! immediately succeeded, stayed on as the announcer for Outta Here!. Unlike Total Panic, which aired for three hours on Sunday mornings, Outta Here! aired for 30 minutes on late weekday afternoons.
