= Righter =

Righter is a surname. Notable people with the surname include:

- Carroll Righter (1900–1988), American astrologer
- Dale Righter (born 1966), American politician
- Erwin Righter (1897–1985), American rugby union footballer
- Walter C. Righter (born 1923), Episcopal bishop in the United States
