= The Mask of Nostradamus =

1990 book by James Randi

The Mask of Nostradamus: The Prophecies of the World's Most Famous Seer
- First edition
- Author: James Randi
- Publisher: Charles Scribner's Sons (1990); Prometheus Books (1993)
- Publication date: 1990
- Publication place: United States
- Pages: 256
- ISBN: 0-684-19056-7
- OCLC: 27034316
- Dewey Decimal: 133.3/092 B
- LC Class: BF1815.N8 R35 1993

The Mask of Nostradamus: The Prophecies of the World's Most Famous Seer is a 1990 book by magician and skeptic James Randi. Randi provides an overview of the life and work of Nostradamus, a 16th-century French physician and astrologer who, in a series of quatrains in Les Prophéties, allegedly predicted several major historical events. Randi argues that Nostradamus was actually an exceptionally poor prognosticator who used vague and ambiguous language to give an illusion of authenticity. Randi further describes the widespread use of poor scholarship, mistranslations, and reference to forged prophecies by Nostradamus's believers, and describes dubious methods that believers have used to obtain meaning from Nostradamus's prophecies. Randi also provides an overview of the popularity and pseudoscientific nature of astrology, a technique that Nostradamus used to prepare prophecies, as well as providing an overview of other prophets and their methods. The book received generally positive reviews.

== Background ==
Michele de Nostredame (1503–1566), popularly known by the Latinised name Nostradamus, was a French physician and astrologer who developed a reputation as a prophet. Nostradamus is most famous for Les Prophéties, which contains the Centuries, a collection of 942 allegedly prophetic quatrains, and also contains an epistle to Henry II of France. The Centuries in particular have garnered much interest up to the present day, and some of them have been retroactively interpreted to predict major events such as the death of Henry II of France, the flight and capture of King Louis XVI and Marie Antoinette, the Great Fire of London, the execution of Charles I of England, and the rise of Adolf Hitler.

James Randi was a Canadian American magician and author who was also known for investigating supernatural and pseudoscientific claims. Randi had previously written an article about Nostradamus in 1982 for Skeptical Inquirer. In The Mask of Nostradamus, he greatly expands upon this work, aiming to bring a skeptical perspective to the Centuries and produce "a more likely and rational point of view" than the majority of books about Nostradamus, which Randi generally views as credulous and lacking in high-quality scholarship. However, Randi's examination of the Centuries forms only a small section of the book, as he also wanted to understand "who [Nostradamus] was and what drove him".; thus, Randi also provides a biography of Nostradamus, an overview of the historical context in which he was operating, and an overview of the use of astrology through history, as Nostradamus used horoscopes prepare his quatrains. In conducting his research, Randi also consulted with Everett Bleiler, who translated Nostradamus's quatrains into English, and Randi offers several insights from Bleiler throughout the book.

== Summary ==
=== Chapter 1-3 ===
Randi outlines Nostradamus's early life and bibliography, and notes the apocryphal nature of some stories about Nostradamus's prophetic abilities. He then uses specific examples from Nostradamus, the "Nostradamians" (interpreters of Nostradamus), and the astrologer Jeane Dixon, to demonstrate strategies that prophets use in order to appear successful and earn a reputation as a seer.

=== Chapters 4-6 ===
Randi describes the era within which Nostradamus lived as an age of civil and religious wars, as well as heavy censorship. Nostradamus was protected, however, by Catherine de' Medici, Queen of France, and by his support for the aristocracy. However, Randi notes that Nostradamus made several inaccurate predictions for Catherine and failed to predict the collapse of the Valois family. Randi then describes medical practices that were used during this period, including "medical astrology". Randi notes that Nostradamus developed a good reputation as a physician for his treatment of the plague, but that this was possibly due to the treatment of undiagnosed syphilis. Randi then contrasts science and magic, describes the spread of Nostradamus's almanacs and Centuries throughout Europe, and notes that Nostradamus failed to predict the death of Henry II of France.

=== Chapters 7-9 ===
Randi outlines the pseudoscientific nature of astrology and horoscopes, but also details the popularity of astrology throughout history, including its use by Nostradamus, promotion by Catherine de' Medici, and use in the Reagan White House via Joan Quigley. Randi also notes that there has been speculation about the use of hallucinogenic drugs by Nostradamus, but concludes that there is little evidence in support of this idea. Randi then outlines the use and promotion of pseudoscience and the occult by the Nazi Party, with a focus on their use of astrology via Karl Ernst Krafft, who became personal astrologer to Rudolf Hess. Krafft reinterpreted Nostradamus's prophecies for the Nazis, predicting a sweeping victory for Germany. In response, the British assembled their own group of astrologers, led by Louis de Wohl. De Wohl wrote fake quatrains, credited to Nostradamus, in order to neutralise Krafft's reinterpretations. Randi notes that these forgeries are still sometimes cited as proof of Nostradamus's prophetic ability. Randi then provides an overview of other prophets who were contemporaries of Nostradamus, including John Dee, Cosimo Ruggeri, Mother Shipton, and Paracelsus.

=== Chapters 10-12 ===
Randi argues that there is no credible evidence to support the notion that Nostradamus had foresight. Using examples from the Nostradamians, Randi describes the widespread use of poor scholarship, scientific and historical errors, mistranslations, and even the use of forged quatrains. Randi then focuses on ten quatrains that have been cited as proof of Nostradamus's prophetic ability, including quatrains cited as predicting the Death of Henry II of France, the flight and capture of King Louis XVI and Marie Antoinette, and events surrounding Adolf Hitler. Randi describes several arbitrary and dubious methods that the Nostradamians have used to obtain meaning from Nostradamus's quatrains, such as the use of symbolic references (e.g., taking the French word for "lion" in a quatrain to refer to Henry II. In fact, France did not use the lion as a symbol for the monarchy unlike other countries.), the use of anagrams and anagrams with letters changed (such as obtaining "Hitler" from Nostradamus's use of the word "Hister", which actually referred to the lower Danube River), altering the punctuation in the quatrains, and using special pleading. Randi ends by stating that the mystique of Nostradamus will "survive us all" because of the "seductive attraction" of the idea that Nostradamus could see into the future.

== Reception ==
The Mask of Nostradamus received generally positive reviews. Publishers Weekly praised Randi's "meticulous readings of key quatrains" that "make a potent case for his contention that the seer's alleged clairvoyant abilities rest on translators' embellishments, interpreters' excessive reliance on anagrams and 'hidden' names, distortions and wishful thinking", but also noted the book's "overkill in challenging all prophecy and the occult in general". Writing in The Washington Post, John Crowley praised Randi's takedown of Nostradamus, but criticised some of Randi's "unscholarly procedures" and disjointed style. In the Chicago Tribune, Peter Gorner described it as an "outstanding book, full and rich, a meticulous and thoughtful work of historical scholarship", also commenting positively on Randi's placement of Nostradamus in context. For The Pittsburgh Press, David Walton praised Randi's skeptical approach for "giving readers what they need rather than what they truly want", but also noted that Randi "tends to meander". Wendy Grossman, writing for New Scientist, praised Randi's ability to provide "rational explanations" and show how Nostradamus's quatrains have been distorted to derive meaning from them, but also criticised the book for not being "well structured".

Malcolm Dean, the author of The Astrology Game, gave the book a negative review in the Los Angeles Times. Dean wrote that Randi "goes beyond laying out the evidence and frequently makes disparaging and manipulative comments that demean the reader". He also found fault with Randi's "attacks on Jeane Dixon, card sharks, modern astrology and 'Nostradamians'", and argued that Randi puts down anyone "who does not share his materialistic viewpoint". Dean devoted a large section of his review to negative commentary about CSICOP, of which Randi was a founding member, believing that Randi was involved in experiments that provided scientific evidence in favour of astrology and that these results were suppressed by Randi and his colleagues. In response, Randi defended his book, stating that Dean "makes unsupported accusations of purposeful omissions, prejudice, and a lack of scholarship on my part". Randi was also critical of Dean for devoting "some 40% of his review not to my book but to a curious statistical finding of two French psychologists, a matter in which I was not 'closely associated' as he chooses to state; I was not in any way involved with it." Edward Chase, senior editor at Charles Scribner's Sons, and Ed Krupp, director of the Griffith Observatory, criticised the Los Angeles Times for allowing someone who believes in astrology to write a review of Randi's book.

The Mask of Nostradamus has also received praise within the skeptic movement. In a bibliography entitled "Science versus the Paranormal" published in the academic journal Behavioural & Social Sciences Librarian, Joe Nickell recommended the book, stating that Randi "[reveals] how vague phraseology and other means have helped to give undue credibility to Nostradamus' numerous prognostications". In Robert Todd Carroll's The Skeptic's Dictionary, Randi is credited with debunking the notion that Nostradamus referenced Adolf Hitler in one of his quatrains. Writing for Skeptical Inquirer, Hugh H. Trotti praised Randi's use of historians and historical documents to produce "revealing insights into the meaning of some of the seer’s writings". Rebecca Watson said that it is "one of the best books ever written about [Nostradamus]", praising its thoroughness and applauding Randi for exposing Nostradamus's predictions "for exactly what they are".

== Editions and translations ==
- First edition (Charles Scribner's Sons; 1990)
- Paperback edition (Prometheus Books; 1993)
- French: Le vrai visage de Nostradamus : les prophéties du mage le plus célèbre du monde (1993)
- Polish: Nostradamus bez maski (1994)
- Japanese: ノストラダムスの大誤解 : イカサマまみれの伝說43の真相 (1999)
- Italian : La maschera di Nostradamus (2001)
