= James Bethea =

American television writer and producer

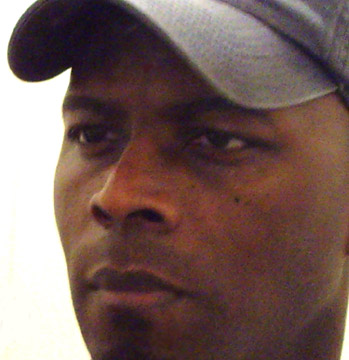
- Bethea in Los Angeles, September 2008
- Born: James A. Bethea Jr. January 14, 1965 (age 61); Harlem, New York, U.S.
- Education: The Bronx High School of Science; Hunter College
- Occupations: Writer, producer
- Years active: 1982–present

James A. Bethea Jr. (born January 14, 1965) is an American writer, producer and occasional performer, primarily in the field of television. As the former Head of Current Programming for UPN, he is among a handful of African Americans to head a programming department at a broadcast network. Series overseen by him at UPN include Star Trek: Voyager, Dilbert, Clueless, and Moesha. As an actor, his work has included 2008's Iron Man and the 2010 sequel, Iron Man 2.

== Early life and education ==
Bethea was born in New York City's Harlem, the son of Constance, a social worker, and James Sr., a hospital laboratory technician. Following the Bronx High School of Science, he attended Hunter College, majoring in Film and Communications with a minor in computer science.

== Career ==
Bethea began his career in 1982 while a Bronx Science student, as a cast member of the Nickelodeon series Livewire. Finding the behind-the-camera aspects of television equally appealing, he obtained work as a production assistant, first at the Children's Television Workshop, then back at Nickelodeon as a Segment Producer for the 3-hour weekly variety show Total Panic. With high school classmate Karim Miteff, Bethea co-created and produced Nick Arcade, a groundbreaking virtual reality game show whose bluescreen process received an Ultimatte Award for Technical Achievement from the National Association of Broadcasters, as well as a Cable Ace nomination. The series format was licensed and produced worldwide, including as Zona de Juego in Spain for TVE. Bethea also co-created and produced the original Slime Time Live.

In 1997, Bethea was hired by Viacom's UPN as Director of Programming and promoted shortly after to Head of Current Programming. In this capacity, he supervised the production of the network's entire primetime slate, including comedy, drama and alternative series. He also appeared as a Dungeons & Dragons' DM in high school classmate Jon Favreau's 1999 pilot Smog. Eventually, Bethea sold the network a pilot script of his own, The Gibsons and in 2000, returned to freelance producing. The script was not ordered to series.

Tapped again by Nickelodeon in 2003, Bethea developed and produced the TEENick Spin The Bottle franchise, in addition to composing its theme music. In 2005, Bethea began executive producing live television events. They include E!'s Live From the Red Carpet franchise and the 12th Critics' Choice Awards.

He is also the producer of two plays written by actor Mike O'Malley: Three Years From Thirty and Searching For Certainty.

Bethea donned a military uniform to portray an analyst for Jon Favreau in his 2008 Iron Man and its sequel, Iron Man 2; a nod to their days in high school as avid comic book fans.

== Filmography ==
=== Actor ===
- Iron Man (2008) - CAOC Analyst #4
- Iron Man 2 (2010) - Security Force #1

=== Executive producer ===
- Live From the Red Carpet: The 2005 Emmy Awards (2005)
- E!'s Live Countdown to the Golden Globes (2006)
- E!'s Live Countdown to the Academy Awards (2006)
- E!'s Live Countdown to the Golden Globes (2007)
- Live From the Red Carpet: The 2007 Golden Globe Awards (2007)
- Live From the Red Carpet: The 2007 Screen Actor's Guild Awards (2007)
- E!'s Live Countdown to the SAG Awards (2007)
- Live From the Red Carpet: The 2007 Grammy Awards (2007)
- E!'s Live Countdown to the Grammys (2007)
- E!'s Live Countdown to the Academy Awards (2007)
- Live From the Red Carpet: The 2007 Academy Awards (2007)
- 12th Annual Critics' Choice Awards (2007)

=== Executive in charge ===
- Star Trek: Voyager (1995)
- In The House (1995)
- Malcolm & Eddie (1996)
- The Sentinel (1996)
- Sparks (1996)
- Moesha (1996)
- Clueless (1996)
- Hitz (1997)
- The Good News (1997)
- Love Boat: The Next Wave (1998)
- The Secret Diary of Desmond Pfeiffer (1998)
- Legacy (1998)
- Dilbert (1999)

=== Creator (developed) ===
- Slimetime Live (1992)
- Nick Arcade (1992)
- TEENick: Spin the Bottle (2003)
