= Livewire (talk show) =

- Fred Newman hosting
- Presented by: Mark Cordray (1980); Fred Newman (1981-85)
- Country of origin: United States
- Original language: English
- No. of seasons: 4
- No. of episodes: 205

Production
- Executive producers: Alyce Myatt; Jeff Weber
- Producer: Celia Bernstein
- Running time: 1 hour

Original release
- Network: Nickelodeon
- Release: September 29, 1980 – 1985

Livewire is an American children's talk show that premiered on the American television cable network, Nickelodeon on September 29, 1980 and ended in 1985.

The series was designed for kids of all ages, and the show's main focus was to discuss true current events and stories during those times. It was taped at the Ed Sullivan Theater in New York through Reeves Teletape Studios of Sesame Street fame. It was filmed "live on tape" with a participating audience of about twenty to thirty teenagers, and was hosted initially by Mark Cordray, but Fred Newman soon replaced Cordray as host. It was a CableACE Award winner, the first Nickelodeon talk show to achieve that feat. Livewire was the number one rated show on Nickelodeon in 1982, and never went below number seven in the ratings during the five-year span of the show. After the last episode aired, the show went into reruns until May 3, 1986.

The show was mostly known for giving relatively unknown bands and singers their first television appearance. Bands and celebrities who appeared on the program include:

== List of guests ==
- Adam Abeshouse
- Afrika Bambaataa
- Aileen Quinn – from Annie
- Adam Yauch – from Beastie Boys
- Albert Hague – from Fame
- Alex Tannous – psychic
- Average White Band – rock band
- Bill Irwin – actor
- Billy Squier
- Blotto – rock band
- Bow Wow Wow – rock band
- Buckner & Garcia
- Caian Devora – actor
- Carlene Carter – singer
- Carroll Righter – astrologer
- Chris Atkins – actor
- Comateens – rock band
- David Liederman
- DJ Jazzy Jay – hip hop DJ
- Dr. Michael Carrera – author
- Edward Bush – director of The Museum of Holography
- Eek-A-Mouse – reggae artist
- Erin Gray – actor
- Errol Manoff and the Fantasy Factory
- Eubie Blake
- Frank Zappa
- Fred Newman – voice actor
- Garland Jeffreys – singer
- Gene Roddenberry – creator of Star Trek
- Geri Jewell – from The Facts of Life
- Graham Nash – singer
- Grey Panthers
- Haircut One Hundred – music group
- Jack "Hacksaw" Reynolds – linebacker, San Francisco 49ers
- Jackie Torrence – storyteller
- James Bethea
- James Earl Jones – actor
- Jennifer Gatti – actor
- Jimmy Baio
- Joffrey Ballet Concert Group
- John Hurt
- John E. Mack – psychiatrist
- Jordan Walker-Pearlman
- June Foray – voice actor
- Kiss – rock band
- Laurie Anderson – performance artist, singer
- Lazoo
- Lee Curreri – from Fame
- Little Steven & the Disciples of Soul
- The Lords of the New Church – rock band
- Manowar
- Mark Cordray
- Mark Wilson – magician
- Marty Feldman
- Merri Wood – physicist
- Molly Picon
- Mummenschanz – theater company
- Novo Combo
- Paul Reiser – actor
- Phil Paul Call
- The Pink Ladies – from Grease 2
- Psychedelic Furs – rock band
- R.E.M. – rock band
- The Ramones – punk rand
- Ray Williams – manager of Six Flags Over Texas
- Rene Teboe
- Ricky Schroder – from Silver Spoons
- Robert Duvall
- Robert Truax
- Ronnie Dyson – singer
- Ronnie Lamm – PTA council president
- Rudolf of Danceteria – October 30, 1983
- Split Enz
- Stanley Jarocki – Vice President of Marketing for Bally Midway
- Stephanie Mills
- Sugar Hill Gang – rap group
- Teresa de Rose and Andrew Needhammer – from American Ballet Theatre II
- Tom Savini – special effects makeup artist
- The Tom Tom Club – rock band
- Triumph – Mike Levine
- Twisted Sister – rock band
- Valerie Harper – The Hunger Project
- Valerie Landsburg – from Fame
- The cast of You Can't Do That on Television
