= Robyn Griggs =

American actress (1973–2022)

Robyn Griggs (April 30, 1973 – August 13, 2022) was an American musical theatre, television, and film actress.

Griggs, who was born in Tunkhannock, Pennsylvania, began her career as a child actor when she played the role of Molly in Annie and hosted the Nickelodeon kids show Rated K. She became most notable for her young adult roles in the daytime soap operas One Life to Live (1991–92) as Stephanie Hobart, for which she was nominated at the 14th Youth in Film Awards for Best Young Actress in a Daytime Series, and Another World (1993–95) as Maggie Cory.

After being fired from Another World in 1995, Griggs claimed on the show Hard Copy it was because of her relationship with John Wayne Bobbitt, who she claimed was just a friend, while producers claimed they were taking the role in a new direction. In 1995, she took time away from acting after growing tired of acting on television during the day and then theater at night. Griggs returned to acting in 2003, mainly in independent horror films, including Zombiegeddon.

In 2020, Griggs revealed that she had stage IV cervical cancer, and she died of the disease on August 13, 2022, age 49.

== Select filmography ==
=== Television ===
Year	Title	Role	Notes
1986-1988	Rated K		
1991–1992	One Life to Live	Stephanie Hobart	6 episodes
1993-1995	Another World	Maggie Cory	21 episodes

=== Film ===
Year	Title	Role
2003	Zombiegeddon	Radio station zombie
2003	Minds of Terror	Android girl
2003	Severe Injuries	
2004	Dead Clowns	
2006	The Absence of Light	
2008	October Moon 2: November Son	Brielle
2010	Hellweek	
2018	Slashers Gone Wild: Bloodbath	Alicia
2015	Joey Hollywood's Movie Night 2	Crazy Scream Queen
