= Richard Darman =

American businessman and government official (1943–2008)

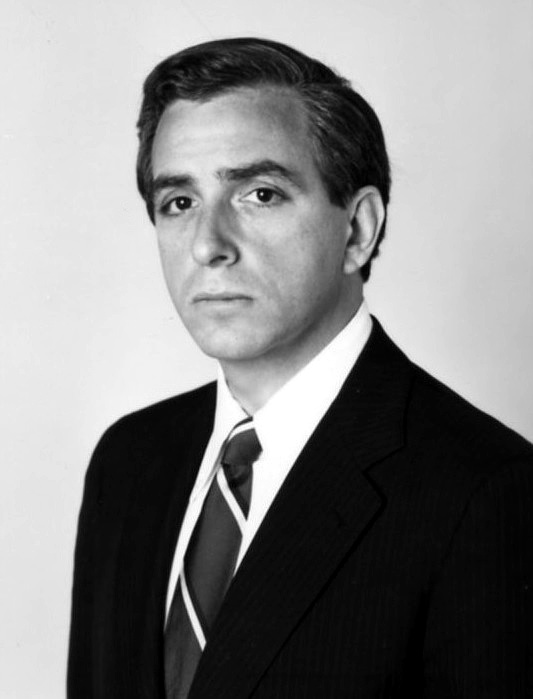
- Darman in 1983

28th Director of the Office of Management and Budget
- In office January 25, 1989 – January 20, 1993
- President: George H. W. Bush
- Preceded by: Joe Wright
- Succeeded by: Leon Panetta

2nd United States Deputy Secretary of the Treasury
- In office October 7, 1985 – August 28, 1987
- President: Ronald Reagan
- Preceded by: R. T. McNamar
- Succeeded by: Peter McPherson

White House Staff Secretary
- In office June 17, 1981 – February 1, 1985
- President: Ronald Reagan
- Preceded by: David Gergen
- Succeeded by: David Chew

Personal details
- Born: Richard Gordon Darman; May 10, 1943 Charlotte, North Carolina, U.S.
- Died: January 25, 2008 (aged 64) Washington, D.C., U.S.
- Party: Republican
- Spouse: Kathleen Emmet (m. 1967)
- Children: 3
- Education: Harvard University (BA, MBA)

Richard Gordon Darman (May 10, 1943 – January 25, 2008) was an American businessman and government official who served in senior positions during the presidencies of Ronald Reagan and George H. W. Bush.

== Early life ==
Darman was born in Charlotte, North Carolina, the son of Eleanor F. and Morton H. Darman. His father was a textile mill owner.

Darman graduated with honors from Harvard College in 1964 and from the Harvard Graduate School of Business Administration in 1967.

== Career ==
Darman held several governmental positions under James Baker, including as Assistant Secretary of Commerce (1976–1977). After the defeat of Gerald Ford, Darman became a member of the faculty of Harvard Kennedy School, to which he would return on two occasions between 1977 and 2002.

When Baker became White House Chief of Staff under President Reagan, Darman returned to serve as Assistant to the President of the United States and White House Staff Secretary (1981–1985), before following Baker to the Treasury Department as Deputy Secretary of the Treasury (1985–1987). Darman described his role under Baker as akin to a "hatchet man", with his duties including the smearing of Baker rivals Alexander Haig, Ed Meese, and William J. Casey.

Darman served as Director of the Office of Management and Budget for the entire presidency of the first President Bush. Darman was regarded as provocative and intelligent by Washington insiders but was criticized by some economists for being too focused on the budget deficit and was sometimes blamed for convincing Bush to renege on his promise of "Read my lips: No new taxes," which is widely believed to have contributed to Bush's defeat in the election of 1992. Darman had previously tried to stop Bush from making the promise during the 1988 campaign.

From 1993 until his death in 2008, Darman was a partner and managing director of The Carlyle Group. During that period, Carlyle went from being a small firm with 26 employees to one of the world's largest and most successful private equity firms. Darman was a trustee of the Loomis Sayles Funds, the IXIS Funds, and the Howard Hughes Medical Institute. He served as Chairman of the Board of the Smithsonian National Museum of American History and, in May 2003, became Chairman of the Board of AES Corporation, an electric utility company.

== Personal life ==
He married Kathleen Emmet on September 1, 1967; they had three sons, William T. E., Jonathan W. E. and C. T. Emmet Darman.

Darman was good friends with journalist Bob Woodward. Woodward wrote that Darman regularly leaked information to him, meeting or talking with him on 58 separate occasions. They remained close personal friends until October 1992, when Woodward published a multi-piece critique of the Bush economy—which partly blamed Darman's work as budget chief—despite Darman's pleading that he wait until after the 1992 presidential election. In his 1996 memoir, Darman referred to the break in their friendship as a violation of "both a specific promise and a basic trust with a regrettable public account of the administration’s trials"

Darman died on January 25, 2008, at the age of 64, following a battle with acute myelogenous leukemia.

Political offices
Preceded by David Gergen	White House Staff Secretary; 1981–1985	Succeeded by David Chew
Preceded by R. T. McNamar	United States Deputy Secretary of the Treasury; 1985–1987	Succeeded by Peter McPherson
Preceded by Joe Wright	Director of the Office of Management and Budget; 1989–1993	Succeeded by Leon Panetta
