= Louis Quinn =

American actor

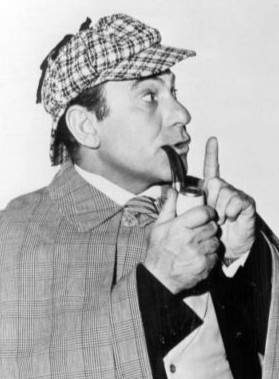
- Quinn as Roscoe on the ABC/Warner Bros. television series, 77 Sunset Strip (1962)
- Born: Louis Frackt; March 23, 1915; Chicago, Illinois, U.S.
- Died: September 14, 1988 (aged 73); Los Angeles, California, U.S.
- Occupation: Actor
- Years active: 1957–1987
- Spouse: Christine Nelson

Louis Quinn (born Louis Frackt; March 23, 1915 – September 14, 1988) was an American television and film actor, best known for his role as Roscoe, the comic relief racetrack tout, from 1958 to 1963 in the ABC/Warner Bros. detective television series, 77 Sunset Strip.

== Early years ==
Born in Chicago, Quinn went to Los Angeles when he was a boy; he was raised by his brother. He sold newspapers on street corners and graduated from Los Angeles High School. He went on to study journalism at the University of New Mexico.

== Military service ==
Quinn was a member of the U.S. Army Signal Corps during World War II. His duties included writing dialogue for training films.

== Radio ==
Quinn began his career as a radio personality, hosting variety shows and writing comedy for Milton Berle and Don McNeill's Breakfast Club.

Early in 1953, WINS in New York City carried The Louis Quinn Show from midnight to 1 a.m., with the program originating in its studios. On December 30, 1953, Quinn began broadcasting his program over KCMJ, Palm Springs, California. The program originated in the Fireside Room of the La Paz Hotel in Palm Springs.

== Film ==
Quinn's writing career began at Warner Bros., where director Bryan Foy signed him as a writer in August 1940. He was the writer for seven feature films before he went into the military during World War II.

On the big screen, Quinn played mostly supporting roles in such films as Al Capone (1959), The Crowded Sky (1960), Gypsy (1962), For Those Who Think Young (1964), Birds Do It (1966), Unholy Rollers (1972), Superchick (1973), Linda Lovelace for President (1975), and All the President's Men (1976).

He was also the emcee for the premiere of Mary Poppins at Grauman's Chinese Theatre on August 27, 1964, though he did not appear in the film itself.

== Television ==
Quinn continued writing for Berle when the comedian made the transition to television in Texaco Star Theatre.

His first television role was as a city council member in the 1956 episode "The Bachelor Party' of Jackie Cooper's NBC sitcom, The People's Choice. In 1958 Quinn appeared (uncredited) as the First Hotel Clerk on the TV western Cheyenne in the episode titled "Dead to Rights."

Quinn began his role of "Roscoe" on 77 Sunset Strip when he was brought in as a script doctor that led to him delivering his own jokes. He admitted that he made more money as a joke writer than he did as an actor.

He appeared regularly on television though not in major or recurring roles apart from 77 Sunset Strip.

He guest starred on the ABC/WB western series, The Alaskans. He appeared in three episodes of ABC's Batman (55, 56 and 111), once on NBC's The Virginian, in the 1977 film Raid on Entebbe, and the sitcoms, Please Don't Eat the Daisies, The Donna Reed Show, Barney Miller and Gilligan's Island.

== Personal life ==
Quinn was married to Christine Nelson, an actress and entertainer in television, film and night clubs. She made guest appearances on 77 Sunset Strip four times during its run, and joined Quinn in appearing as lighthouse keepers "Mr. and Mrs. Keeper" in the Batman TV episode The Joke's on Catwoman (1968). They died a month apart in 1988.

== Death ==
Quinn died of lung cancer at Cedars-Sinai Medical Center in Los Angeles, California. He was 73. His survivors included a daughter, a brother, and four sisters.

== Filmography ==
Year	Title	Role	Notes
1954	There's No Business Like Show Business	Cabbie	Uncredited
1957	Top Secret Affair	Trial Broadcaster	Uncredited
1958	The Deep Six	Fisherman	Uncredited
1958	Too Much, Too Soon	Assistant	Uncredited
1958	Torpedo Run	Sub Crewman	Uncredited
1959	The Trap	Archie Stoner	Uncredited
1959	Al Capone	Joe Lorenzo	
1959	High School Big Shot	Samuel Tallman	
1960	Ocean's 11	DeWolfe	Uncredited
1960	The Crowded Sky	Sidney Schreiber	
1961	Dondi	Dimmy	
1962	Gypsy	Cigar	
1964	For Those Who Think Young	Gus Kestler	
1966	The Las Vegas Hillbillys	Louis Quinn	
1966	Birds Do It	Sgt. Skam	
1971	Welcome to the Club	Capt. Sigmus	
1972	Unholy Rollers	Mr. Stern	
1973	Superchick	Garrick	
1975	Linda Lovelace for President	Dirty Guy #1	
1975	Keep Off My Grass!	Maury Sherman	
1976	All the President's Men	Salesman	
1986	Vasectomy: A Delicate Matter	Priest	
