= Joyce Jillson =

American actress, singer, and astrologer

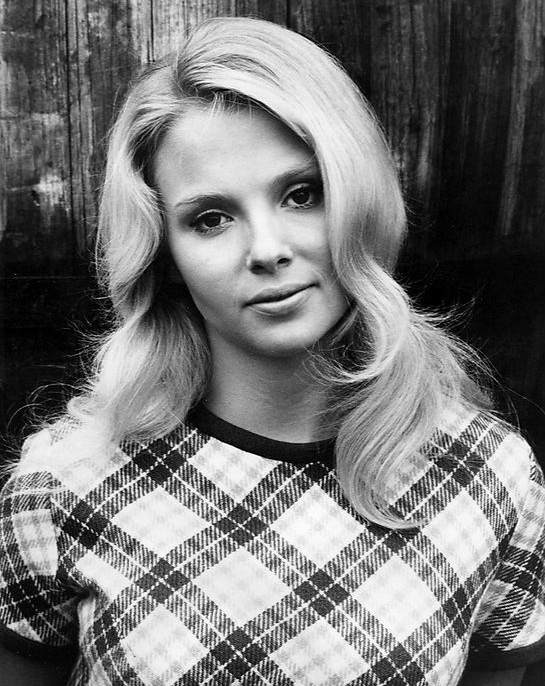
Jillson in 1968

Joyce Jillson (December 26, 1945 – October 1, 2004) was an American syndicated newspaper columnist, best-selling author, actress, and astrologer, whose column was syndicated worldwide in more than 200 papers and magazines.

== Biography ==
Born Joyce Linda Twitchell in Cranston, Rhode Island, she graduated Cranston High School West and later attended Boston University on an opera scholarship. She began her acting career in New York City and appeared on Broadway in the Anthony Newley musical, The Roar of the Greasepaint – The Smell of the Crowd. She starred as Jill Smith in ABC-TV's Peyton Place. She played the lead role in the 1973 cult action spoof Superchick. She appeared in the 1973 Columbo episode "Any Old Port in a Storm", and had roles in the 1976 exploitation film Slumber Party '57.

She began presenting horoscope reports on Los Angeles in 1973, and was the official astrologer for Twentieth Century Fox Studios.

She was also an author, writing Real Women Don't Pump Gas, The Fine Art of Flirting, A Year of Good Luck, and Joyce Jillson's Lifesigns. Her final manuscripts, Astrology for Dogs and Astrology for Cats, were published posthumously.

== Personal life ==
Jillson was married to Joseph Gallagher from 1969 until their divorce in 1981; they had no children. Jillson died of kidney failure at Cedars-Sinai Medical Center at age 58. She had been suffering from diabetes.

== Filmography ==
- Columbo - Any Old Port in a Storm (series) (1973) - Joan Stacey
- Superchick (1973) – Tara B. True
- Slumber Party '57 (1976) – Car Hop - Gladys
- Murder in Peyton Place (1977) – Jill Harrington

== See also ==
- Joan Quigley
- Carroll Righter
- Jeane Dixon
