= The Big Ballot =

Children's television awards show program broadcast in 1987

- Date: March 28 – April 18, 1987
- Location: New York
- Hosted by: Matt Nespole; Rebecca Schwager; Mark Shanahan

Television/radio coverage
- Network: Nickelodeon
- Runtime: 30 minutes

The 1st Annual Nickelodeon Kids' Choice Awards, also known as The Big Ballot, was presented over four episodes of Nickelodeon's movie review program Rated K: For Kids by Kids which aired in 1987. Unlike its successor, the Nickelodeon Kids' Choice Awards, the show was less of a televised live event, and more of a pre-produced program. The trophy that winners received for The Big Ballot was a golden teleidoscope. The in-studio hosts for the show were Matt Nespole, Rebecca Schwager, and Mark Shanahan.

== History and format ==
The show was conceived as a way to "honor kids' opinions about movies and television", furthering Nickelodeon's campaign at the time of being a network that was "for kids, by kids". Ballots for the show's awards were cast via mail, and then the winners would tape a thank you video that was shown during the program. These videos were introduced, and broken up by "link" segments, featuring the Rated K cast. While The Big Ballot was seen as a success, producers Alan Goodman, Albie Hecht, and Fred Seibert were brought in to rebrand and re-launch the award show the following year, modeling future KCA's after MTV's Video Music Awards, which was under the same banner network umbrella now that Nickelodeon had been purchased by Viacom.

== Winners and nominees ==
Below is a complete list of nominees and partial list of winners. Winners are listed first, in bold. Other nominees are in alphabetical order.

=== Movies ===
The winners were announced on March 28, 1987.

Favorite Movie	Favorite Movie Actor
**The Karate Kid Part II**; Crocodile Dundee; Top Gun	**Eddie Murphy**; Tom Cruise – Top Gun as Pete "Maverick" Mitchell; Tom Hanks
Favorite Movie Actress
**Whoopi Goldberg**; Goldie Hawn; Ally Sheedy

=== Television ===
The winners were announced on April 4, 1987.

Favorite TV Show	Favorite TV Actor
**The Cosby Show**; Family Ties; Moonlighting	**Bill Cosby** – The Cosby Show as Cliff Huxtable; Kirk Cameron – Growing Pains as Mike Seaver; Michael J. Fox – Family Ties as Alex P. Keaton
Favorite TV Actress
**Kim Fields** - The Facts of Life as Dorothy "Tootie" Ramsey; Tempestt Bledsoe - The Cosby Show as Vanessa Huxtable; Keshia Knight Pulliam - The Cosby Show as Rudy Huxtable

=== Music ===
The winners were announced on April 11, 1987.

Favorite Music Group	Favorite Male Vocalist
**The Monkees**; The Jets; Huey Lewis and the News	**Phil Collins**; Lionel Richie; Bruce Springsteen
Favorite Female Vocalist
**Madonna**; Whitney Houston; Janet Jackson

=== Sports ===
The winners were announced on April 18, 1987.

Favorite Sports Team	Favorite Male Athlete
Chicago Bears; Los Angeles Lakers; New York Mets	Michael Jordan; Jim McMahon; Darryl Strawberry
Favorite Female Athlete
Valerie Brisco-Hooks; Chris Evert; Debi Thomas
