= Slumber Party '57 =

- Directed by: William A. Levey
- Written by: Frank Farmer
- Story by: William A. Levey
- Produced by: John Ireland
- Starring: Janet Wood; Noelle North; Debra Winger
- Cinematography: Robert Carmico
- Edited by: Bill Casper
- Music by: Miles Goodman
- Distributed by: Cannon Films
- Release date: September 30, 1976
- Running time: 89 minutes
- Country: United States
- Language: English

Slumber Party '57 is a 1976 American comedy-drama film directed by William A. Levey and starring Debra Winger in her feature-film debut.

== Cast ==
- Janet Wood as Smitty
- Noelle North as Angie
- Bridget Holloman as Bonnie May
- Debra Winger as Debbie
- Mary Ann Appleseth as Jo Ann
- Rainbeaux Smith as Sherry
- Rafael Campos as Dope Friend
- Will Hutchins as Harold Perkins
- Joyce Jillson as Gladys, Car Hop
- Joe E. Ross as Patrolman
- Bill Thurman as Mr. Willis
- Janice Karman as Hank

== Soundtrack ==
Although the film features many early rock and roll singles in its soundtrack, most were first released after 1957, including "Chantilly Lace" (1958), "One Summer Night" (1958), "Sea of Love" (1959), "Running Bear" (1959), "What a Diff'rence a Day Makes" (1959), "Hey! Baby" (1961), "Hey Paula" (1962) and "Breaking Up Is Hard to Do" (1962).

== Reception ==
Leonard Maltin awarded the film one and a half stars.
