= Jeane Dixon =

American astrologer and psychic

- Jeane Dixon
- Born: Lydia Emma Pinckert; January 5, 1904; Medford, Wisconsin, US
- Died: January 25, 1997 (aged 93); Washington, D.C., US
- Occupations: Astrologer, psychic

Jeane Dixon (January 5, 1904 – January 25, 1997) was one of the best-known American psychics and astrologers of the 20th century, owing to her alleged prediction of the assassination of President John F. Kennedy, her syndicated newspaper astrology column, some well-publicized predictions, and a best-selling biography.

== Early life ==
Dixon was born Lydia Emma Pinckert, one of 10 siblings born to Richard Franz Pinckert, a native of Gräfenhainichen, Wittenberg, Saxony-Anhalt, Germany, and his wife, Luise Johanne Emma (née Graefe), both Roman Catholics. Dixon was born in Medford, Wisconsin, United States, but raised in Missouri and California. Her birth date was often reported as 1918, and Dixon would proffer this date to reporters, at one point even producing a passport to this effect, but she once testified in a deposition that she was born in 1910. An investigation by a reporter for the National Observer, who interviewed family members and examined official records, concluded she was born in 1904.

Dixon claimed that while growing up in California, a "Gypsy" gave her a crystal ball and read her palm, predicting she would become a famous seer and advise powerful people.

== Family ==
She was married to James Dixon, a divorcé, from 1939 until his death. The couple had no children. James Dixon was a car dealer in California, who later ran a successful real estate company in Washington, D.C. Dixon worked with her husband in the business for many years and served as the company's president.

Dixon was the sister of football player Erny Pinckert.

== Career ==
Dixon reportedly predicted the assassination of President John F. Kennedy. In the May 13, 1956, issue of Parade Magazine she wrote that the 1960 presidential election would be "dominated by labor and won by a Democrat" who would then go on to "be assassinated or die in office though not necessarily in his first term". In 1960, as the election neared, she changed her mind and incorrectly predicted that Richard Nixon would win. She later admitted she "saw Richard Nixon as the winner" and made unequivocal predictions that he would win. She appeared in the film The Man Who Saw Tomorrow, considering the predictions of Nostradamus and discussing her prediction of Kennedy's assassination.

Dixon wrote seven books, including her autobiography, a horoscope book for dogs, and an astrological cookbook. She gained public awareness through the biography A Gift of Prophecy: The Phenomenal Jeane Dixon, written by syndicated columnist Ruth Montgomery. Published in 1965, the book sold more than 3 million copies. She was a devout Roman Catholic and attributed her prophetic ability to God. Another million-seller, My Life and Prophecies, was credited "as told to Rene Noorbergen", but Dixon was sued by Adele Fletcher, who claimed that her rejected manuscript was rewritten and published as that book. Fletcher was awarded 5% of the royalties by a jury.

In 1967, Dixon was called by Webb and Etoila Hunter in Decatur, Alabama, who were searching for their 34-year-old missing daughter, Mary Faye Hunter. Dixon told the family that Mary Faye was okay; however, Mary Faye was found dead several months after her disappearance. On June 5, 1968, Dixon was at the Ambassador Hotel in Los Angeles, California, to give a speech. She was walking to the room she would be speaking at when she passed through the kitchen. That was when she suddenly stopped and purportedly blurted out loud, "This is the place where Robert Kennedy will be shot. I can see him being carried out with blood on his face." Later that day, her prediction was right. In 1969, she was asked to find Dennis Lloyd Martin, a six-year-old boy who had gone missing in the Great Smoky Mountains National Park in Tennessee. She failed to do so.

Richard Nixon followed Dixon's writing through his secretary, Rose Mary Woods, and met with Dixon in the Oval Office in 1971. The following year, her prediction of terrorist attacks in the United States in the wake of the Munich massacre spurred Nixon to create a cabinet committee on counterterrorism. She was one of several astrologers who gave advice to Nancy Reagan.

Dixon predicted that before the end of the 20th century, a pope would suffer bodily harm, while another would be assassinated. These would purportedly correspond with the attempted assassination of Pope John Paul II, and allegations of assassination of Pope John Paul I. She also stated that dissatisfied cardinals would replace a serving pope, which may have referred to John Paul I.

In her 1971 book, The Call to Glory, Dixon predicted that an apocalyptic "war of Armageddon" would occur about the year 2020. In her 1969 book My Life and Prophecies, she apparently predicted a war between China and Russia would occur between 2025 and 2037, initiated and won by China.

== The Jeane Dixon effect ==
John Allen Paulos, a mathematician at Temple University, explored the tendency of Dixon and her fans to promote her few correct predictions while ignoring the larger number of incorrect predictions, naming this habit "the Jeane Dixon effect."

Many of Dixon's predictions proved erroneous, such as her claims that a dispute over the islands of Quemoy and Matsu would trigger the start of World War III in 1958, that American labor leader Walter Reuther would run for president of the United States in the 1964 presidential election, that the second child of Canadian Prime Minister Pierre Trudeau and his wife Margaret would be a girl (they had a boy), and that the Soviets would be the first to put men on the Moon.

In his book The Mask of Nostradamus, James Randi also notes that it is a common strategy of prophets to make many predictions, hoping that some come true, and subsequently ignore all the incorrect predictions. Randi notes a series of incorrect predictions that Dixon made, also noting that these are only a few from a "very long" list. Among these include the predictions that US President Richard Nixon would survive the Watergate scandal and make a comeback, that Russia would be the first country to put a man on the moon, that China would start World War III in 1958, and that the Vietnam War would end in 1966.

== Death ==
Dixon experienced cardiac arrest and died at Sibley Memorial Hospital in Washington, D.C., on January 25, 1997. Before her death, she uttered the words "I knew this would happen." Many of her possessions ended up with Leo M. Bernstein, an investor and banker in Washington, D.C., whose clients included Dixon. In 2002, he opened the Jeane Dixon Museum and Library in Strasburg, Virginia. Bernstein died in 2008. In July 2009, the possessions of the museum, 500 boxes in all, were scheduled to be auctioned.

== Bibliography ==
Publications by Jeane Dixon:

- Dixon, Jeane, co-authored with Noorbergen, Rene, Jeane Dixon: My Life and Prophecies, William Morrow and Company, August 1969.
- Dixon, Jeane. "Kennedy Confidential: the complete unbiased story". Washington, DC: Metro Publishers Representatives, 1969
- Dixon, Jeane, Reincarnation and Prayers to Live By, W. Morrow, 1970.
- Dixon, Jeane, The Call to Glory , Bantam Books, 1971.
- Dixon, Jeane, Yesterday, Today, and Forever, William Morrow and Company, 1975, Andrews McMeel Publishing, 1987.
- Dixon, Jeane, Jeane Dixon's Astrological Cookbook, Morrow, 1976.
- Dixon, Jeane, Horoscopes for Dogs, Houghton Mifflin, 1979.
- Dixon, Jeane, A Gift of Prayer Words of Comfort and Inspiration from the Beloved Prophet and Seer, Viking Studio Books, 1995.
- Dixon, Jeane, Do Cats Have ESP?, Running Press Book Publishers, 1998.

== See also ==
- Joan Quigley
- Carroll Righter
- Joyce Jillson

== Sources ==
- Betz, Paul, (Ed.), Carnes, Mark (Ed.), American National Biography: Supplement 1 (American National Biography Supplement), New York, NY: Oxford University Press, 2002, pp. 163–164. ISBN 978-0-19-515063-6.
- Dixon, Jeane, Noorbergen, Rene, Jeane Dixon: My Life and Prophecies, New York, NY: William Morrow and Company, August 1969. ISBN 978-0-688-02142-9
- Montgomery, Ruth Shick. "A Gift of Prophecy: The Phenomenal Jeane Dixon", New York, NY: Morrow, 1965. ISBN 978-0-688-01689-0
