= Don't Look Now (1983 TV series) =

- Scene from the opening
- Genre: Sketch comedy
- Created by: Roger Price; Geoffrey Darby
- Directed by: Geoffrey Darby
- Starring: Tina Arthur; Ronda Berkman; Paul Branco; Max Casella; Matthew Flynn; Bajah Freeman; Adam Gulinello; Dhonyale Jones; Dylan Jones; Jon Joseph; Jocelyn Leary; David Perrigo; Lisa Rosman
- Country of origin: United States
- Original language: English
- No. of seasons: 1
- No. of episodes: 5

Production
- Producers: Geoffrey Darby; Roger Price
- Running time: 60 minutes
- Production companies: WGBH-TV, Boston, Massachusetts

Original release
- Network: PBS
- Release: October 2 – October 30, 1983

Don't Look Now is an American national children's sketch comedy show produced for PBS by WGBH-TV in Boston, Massachusetts, and created by Geoffrey Darby and Roger Price. It is a clone of their program for CTV and Nickelodeon, You Can't Do That on Television. The first episode aired on October 2, 1983, and showed its final episode on October 30, 1983. It was originally slated to be called Don't Tell Your Mother, but was later changed to its final title, Don't Look Now, due to PBS executive's concern that the title would encourage children to keep secrets from their parents. It was created out of uncertainty that their top show You Can't Do That on Television would continue, and was cancelled possibly due to the complaints of parents for its content, and also Nickelodeon's concern that if had it not been cancelled it may have spelled the end of You Can't Do That on Television.

== Episodes ==
No. in season	Title	Original release date
1	"Episode One"	October 2, 1983
Dylan must learn how to make donuts, but does a terrible job at it. Violet makes bad food at the Camp Pitup. Lisa plays on a men's football team and scores a touchdown. Dylan asks Lisa to a Police concert, though Lisa is unaware that it is the wrong police who Dylan is talking about. Dylan gets lost at a sewage treatment plant and ends up underground, causing him to miss his date with Lisa.
2	"Episode Two"	October 9, 1983
Jon wears a dress for two scenes that Jocelyn really likes and wants to buy from him, but then ruins the dress when she gets yellow yucked (slimed). Bajah is made to drink papaya juice, which she hates, and Jon learns about tugboats.
3	"Episode Three"	October 16, 1983
Max and Paul trick the Pirate into falling off his plank. Lisa calls the fire department hoping to raise money, but gets their voice mail instead. The dad eats his kid's game pieces, so the kids have to find something else to play with - their food!
4	"Episode Four"	October 23, 1983
The gang decides to sell Jon's old bicycle to raise money to buy t-shirts, and instead end up selling Jocelyn's new bike. Jocelyn gets a reluctant Dylan to appear in their ad by promising him a date with Lisa. They owe $750 for making the ad but only raise $75 for selling the bike to Lisa, and Jocelyn is horrified that her bike only sold for $75.
5	"Episode Five"	October 30, 1983
This is mentioned as the last episode. Lisa and Max help The Police make radio cassettes due to a shortage. The network computer mentions the show is boring and needs more violence, leading the girls to buy guns from the camera men. Adam learns how to babysit. At the end of the show, the makeup lady finally slips up, utters the magic words and gets yellow yucked, much to the delight of the kids.

== Format and similarities and differences between You Can't Do That On Television and Don't Look Now ==
The format of Don't Look Now is along the same lines as the first season of YCDTOTV, when it was a local program produced at originating station CJOH-TV in Ottawa, Ontario, in which it also included contests for viewers, as well as music videos. Some of the sketches presented on Don't Look Now were recycled from that season of YCDTOTV. The show shared many similarities with YCDTOTV, however there are some differences that set the two shows apart:

- Unlike YCDTOTV each episode of Don't Look Now did not have a particular topic or name for each episode, and there were no opposite skits, or pie scenes.
- Water was not dumped from above after saying "water", though one character did have a bucket of water dumped on them, just like in an early 1979 WTYO/YCDTOTV skit between Les Lye and Jono Gebert.
- "Green slime" was replaced by "yellow yuck" (which was actually a yellow version of the original YCDTOTV slime, but was never referred to as "slime"). The trigger phrase, "I don't know!", became "Don't blame me!"
- The kids told jokes to each other, but rather than the setting of a locker room, they sat on a bench outside the principal's office. At the end of the jokes, a kid was always called to the office.
- Unlike YCDTOTV whose number of kids who would star in each episode often varied, Don't Look Now only had a number of five kids starring in each episode.
- Don't Look Now, unlike YCDTOTV, did not have a preempt opening sketch and would open each episode with a disclaimer saying "Some content may not be suitable for some children, viewer descretion is advised".
- Just like the kid cast of YCDTOTV the kid cast of Don't Look Now used their real names on the show, but unlike the kid cast members of YCDTOTV who were sometimes related, as some cast were sometimes brothers and sisters of each other, none of the kid cast from Don't Look Now were related.
- All the kids in the Don't Look Now cast seemed to be very young, preteens perhaps, unlike some of the cast of YCDTOTV, some of which were teenagers, and sometimes even adults, and the adult male character David Perrigo from Don't Look Now seemed to be a lot younger than the elderly Les Lye, who was the adult male character on YCDTOTV.
- The dad from Don't Look Now who would often have a pipe in his mouth which he would sometimes smoke, was very clean-cut and thin and wore a navy blue dress suit with a white shirt and tie, unlike the dad on YCDTOTV who was very slovenly, overweight, and wore a white shirt with stains.
- Miss Pell, the classroom teacher from Don't Look Now was very much like Mr. Shidtler, the classroom teacher from YCDTOTV, or Ruth Buzzi's Miss Fit character from the YCDTOTV spinoff Whatever Turns You On, as she was very strict and often said nasty things, and was mean to her students. However, unlike Mr. Shidtler, she never said the phrase "Where does the school board find them, and why do they keep sending them to me?!" Also unlike YCDTOTV who featured a principal who was in many different skits, Don't Look Now never had a principal in any skit.
- Just like YCDTOTV, during one of the home scenes on Don't Look Now, the phrase "Please let me be adopted!" was said once by Max Casella, but the phrase "Don't encourage your mother!" was never said by the dad; also, another key phrase that was often used on YCDTOTV, but was never said on Don't Look Now was "Sometimes it's so easy I'm ashamed of myself!"
- Jocelyn Leary from Don't Look Now also claimed to be a rich kid, just like Naida Gosselin from the 1986 104th YCDTOTV episode "Poverty and Unemployment", who in a sense was like Naida, as Jocelyn would also often boast about being rich, and like Naida, Jocelyn would wear expensive clothes. However, unlike Naida, Jocelyn was somewhat friendly, complimentative, helpful and not quite as dictative.
- Don't Look Now's "Walk the plank" sketches were the equivalent of "the firing squad" on YCDTOTV. Just like El Capitano on YCDTOTV, The Pirate from Don't Look Now was also often easily fooled by the kid cast from being executed, yet unlike YCDTOTV, the exasperated question asked of the executioner, "What is it this time?", was said only once on Don't Look Now by the pirate, while it was asked in almost every scene by El Capitano on YCDTOTV.
- Just like YCDTOTV, which had a producer who was mean to the kid cast and often made them do things they did not want to do, Don't Look Now also claimed to have a mean producer, who made people do things they did not want to do, like making Bajah drink papaya juice (which she hated). However, unlike YCDTOTV, the producer of Don't Look Now never appeared on the show.
- There was also a link set on Don't Look Now, but it was much different from the link set on YCDTOTV, and unlike YCDTOTV having a male technical director named Ross Ewich, who often appeared on the link set, Don't Look Now had a makeup lady named Bunny, who also frequently appeared on their link set.
- Don't Look Now also included educational segments in which the cast would visit places like dairy farms, stores, factories, banks, boats, childcare, aquariums, orchestras, sewage treatment plants, and laboratories. This was due to PBS's mandate that the show include some educational content, unlike YCDTOTV, which strived to be as uneducational as possible.

== Comparison list ==
Many of the characters/locations/elements in the Don't Look Now 1983 TV series share similarities to the pre-existing and co-existing You Can't Do That On Television characters. Comparing Don't Look Now (left) with You Can't Do That on Television (right):

Characters

- Violet = Barth
- Miss Pell = Mr. Shidtler
- The pirate = El Capitano
- Bunny the makeup lady = Ross Ewich
- Anthony the house dad = Lance Prevert
- Louise the house mom = Valerie Prevert
- Prentice Howard Devonshive III = L. Nickelson Dime III

Elements

- Yellow yuck = Green slime
- "Don't blame me!" = "I don't know!"
- Walk the plank = The firing squad
- Camp Pitup = Barth's Burgers
- "Shut up and eat!" = "Duh IIIIIIII heard that!"
- "Avast me hearties and you walk the plank!" = "Ready... Aim..."

== Role of Adult Characters ==
Ronda Berkman played the makeup lady, the house mom, strict schoolteacher Miss Pell, and Violet the nasty camp instructor; when the kids would complain about how nasty the food was, Violet would tell the kids to "Shut up and eat!" (an analogue to Barth's "Duh IIIIIIII heard that!" on YCDTOTV). David Perrigo played a pirate, a cameraman, Mr. Richards, and the house dad. He was also the narrator for the educational sequences. The pirate would tell the kids, before they walked the plank, "Avast me hearties, and you walk the plank!" (similar to El Capitano's "Ready... Aim...").

== Music videos ==
Every episode had three music videos. Videos featured on Don't Look Now included:

- UB40 - "I've Got Mine" - episode one
- The Police - "Every Breath You Take" - episode one
- Split Enz - "Never Ceases to Amaze Me" - episode one
- Billy Joel - "Tell Her About It" - episode two
- Men at Work - "Dr. Heckyll and Mr. Jive" - episode two
- Elvis Costello - "Everyday I Write the Book" - episode two
- The Manhattans - "Crazy" - episode three
- Toto - "Waiting for Your Love" - episode three
- Loverboy - "Queen of the Broken Hearts" - episode three
- OXO - "Whirly Girl" - episode four
- Donna Summer - "Unconditional Love" - episode four
- Lionel Richie - "All Night Long (All Night)" - episode four
- Bananarama - "Shy Boy" - episode five
- Rick Springfield - "Human Touch" - episode five
- Stevie Wonder - "Do I Do" - episode five

== Cast ==
Name	First Appearance	Last Appearance	Slimed	Watered	Chilied	Syruped	Milked
Tina Arthur	October 2, 1983	October 23, 1983	Episodes One				
Ronda Berkman	October 2, 1983	October 30, 1983	Episode Five				
Paul Branco	October 2, 1983	October 16, 1983				Episode One	
Adam Gulinello	October 2, 1983	October 30, 1983	Episode One, Five		Episode One		
Dylan Jones	October 2, 1983	October 23, 1983	Episode Four				
David Perrigo	October 2, 1983	October 30, 1983					Episode Five
Lisa Rosman	October 2, 1983	October 30, 1983		Episode One			
Max Casella (Max Deitch)	October 9, 1983	October 30, 1983	Episode Two				
Bajah Freeman	October 9, 1983	October 30, 1983					
Jon Joseph	October 9, 1983	October 9, 1983					
Jocelyn Leary	October 9, 1983	October 23, 1983	Episode Two, Four				
Dhonyale Jones	October 16, 1983	October 30, 1983					

== Controversy, cancellation, and ratings ==
The voice of David Perrigo would announce the disclaimer at the start of each program: "The following show is not intended for pre-school aged children. Viewer discretion is advised".

It was very highly rated (the second highest rated kids show that PBS had ever broadcast, even beating out Sesame Street in viewership) and was shown for six Sundays, including all of October. However, due to complaints from both parents and Nickelodeon executives, PBS decided not to pick up additional episodes.

The Don't Look Now series was believed to be lost forever until all five episodes surfaced in early 2013, and have been posted on YouTube as well, but with the music videos edited out. No networks are currently airing Don't Look Now and there are no plans have been announced for a DVD release.

Major funding for Don't Look Now was provided by the Mable Louise Riley Foundation, a Boston-based foundation with interest in children and youth. Additional funding was provided by public television stations and the Corporation for Public Broadcasting.
