= Superchick (film) =

1973 film by Ed Forsyth

- Theatrical release poster
- Directed by: Ed Forsyth
- Screenplay by: Gary Crutcher
- Story by: John H. Burrows
- Produced by: John H. Burrows; Marilyn Jacobs Tenser
- Starring: Joyce Jillson; Louis Quinn; Thomas Reardon; Tony Young; Timothy Wayne Brown
- Cinematography: Paul Hipp
- Music by: Allan Alper
- Production company: Marimark Productions
- Distributed by: Crown International Pictures
- Release date: September 1973
- Running time: 94 minutes
- Country: United States
- Language: English

Superchick is a 1973 American action comedy exploitation film directed by Ed Forsyth and starring Joyce Jillson, Louis Quinn, Thomas Reardon, Tony Young, and Timothy Wayne Brown. The film was released by Crown International Pictures in September 1973.

The film has the typical themes of a martial arts film. A female martial artist, trained in karate, has to stop an aircraft hijacking.

== Plot ==
Tara B. True is a vibrant, multi-talented woman who leads a double life. During the work week, she serves as a flight attendant for a major airline, dressed demurely and wearing a brown wig. However, in each city she visits, the blonde Tara adopts a different persona to cater to a variety of boyfriends, ranging from a wealthy businessman to a revolutionary militant.

Tara is also a highly skilled martial artist, possessing a black belt in karate. She frequently uses these skills to thwart muggers, street thugs, and chauvinistic men who underestimate her. Her "Superchick" moniker stems from her ability to handle any dangerous situation with ease and style.

The episodic narrative follows Tara through several distinct subplots:

- Miami: Tara spends time with Johnny, a high-stakes gambler. When a group of hoodlums attempts to shake him down during a boat trip, Tara intervenes, using her martial arts prowess to defeat the attackers single-handedly.
- New York: She visits a sensitive, intellectual boyfriend, showcasing her ability to adapt her personality to suit different social circles.
- The Heist: The plot shifts into a crime-thriller when Tara inadvertently becomes involved in a armored car robbery orchestrated by a gang of criminals. Unlike her previous encounters, this situation requires her to use her wit as much as her physical strength. Her "secret identity" as Superchick is exposed when her wig and part of her dress is torn off, as she uses her karate skills to subdue and capture the criminals.

The film concludes with Tara continuing her jet-setting lifestyle, remaining fiercely independent and refusing to be tied down by any one man or conventional societal expectation.

== Cast ==
- Joyce Jillson as Tara B. True/Superchick
- Louis Quinn as Garrick (as Louie Quinn)
- Thomas Reardon as Ernest
- Tony Young as Johnny
- Timothy Wayne Brown as Davy (as Timothy Wayne-Brown)
- John Carradine as Igor Smith
- Junero Jennings as Sims
- Steve Drexel as Pete
- James Carroll Jordan as Marine
- Jack Wells as Announcer
- Gus Peters as Flasher
- Norman Bartold as Old Policeman
- Phil Hoover as Tommy Hooks
- Fuji as Aki
- Dale Ishimoto as Karate Instructor
- Marland Proctor as Co-Pilot
- Uschi Digard as Mayday
- Gary Crutcher as Young Policeman
- John Donovan as Bagman
- Lilyan McBride as Little Old Lady (as Lilyan MacBride)
- Flo Lawrence as Party Girl (as Flo Gerrish)
- Candy Samples as Lady on Boat (as Mary Gavin)
- Myron Griffin as Nudie Producer
- Ralph Campbell as Butler
- Jana Scott as Stewardess
- Matthew Forsyth as Little Boy
- Rick Cassidy as Dungeon Master on Movie Set (uncredited)
- Dan Haggerty as Biker with Bandana (uncredited)
- Jay Scott as Bodyguard in Tan Suit (uncredited)
- Ray Sebastian as Movie Crew Member in Black (uncredited)
