= Donald Regan =

American banker and cabinet official (1918–2003)

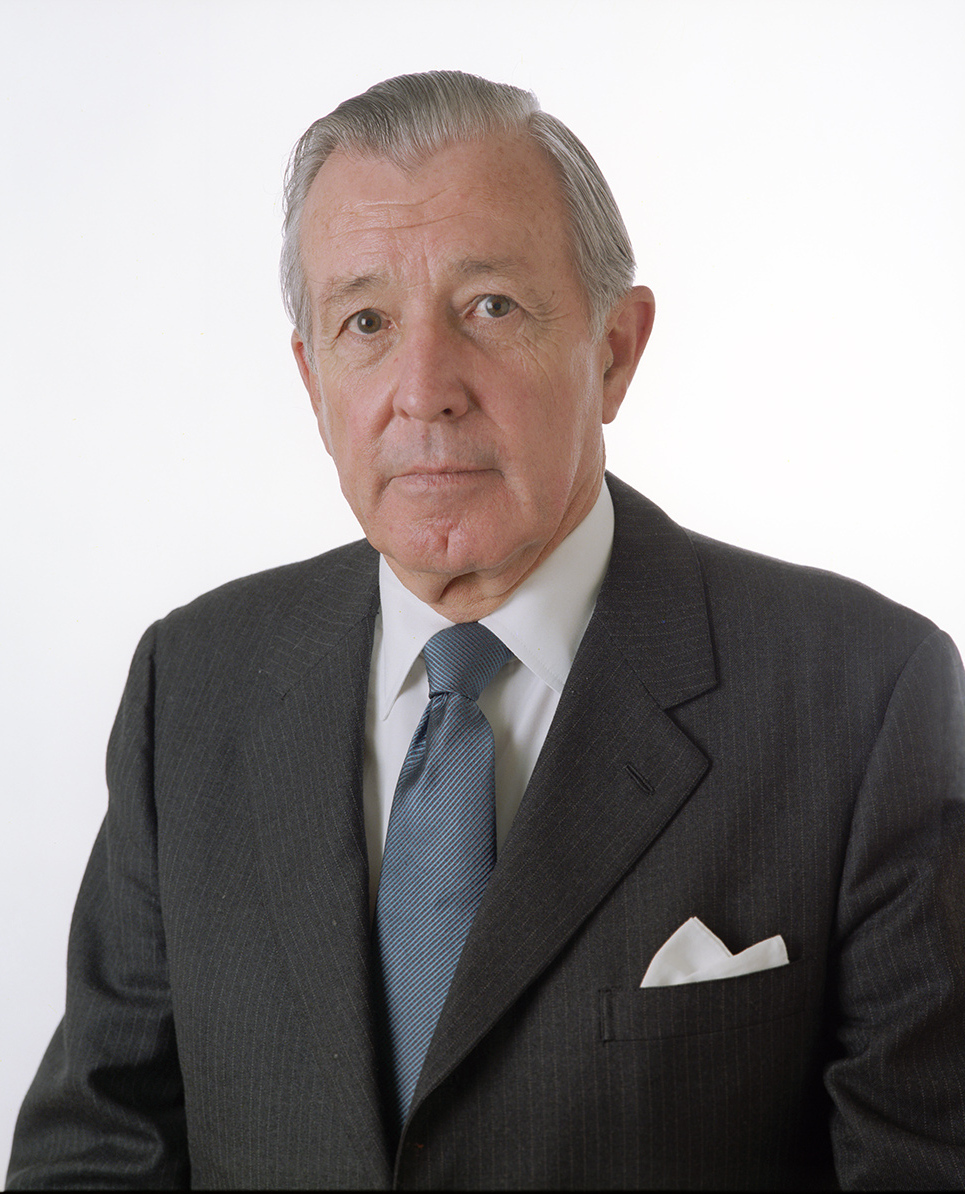
- Regan in 1985

11th White House Chief of Staff
- In office February 4, 1985 – February 27, 1987
- President: Ronald Reagan
- Preceded by: James Baker
- Succeeded by: Howard Baker

66th United States Secretary of the Treasury
- In office January 22, 1981 – February 1, 1985
- President: Ronald Reagan
- Deputy: R. T. McNamar
- Preceded by: G. William Miller
- Succeeded by: James Baker

Personal details
- Born: Donald Thomas Regan; December 21, 1918 Cambridge, Massachusetts, U.S.
- Died: June 10, 2003 (aged 84) Williamsburg, Virginia, U.S.
- Party: Republican
- Spouse(s): Ann George Buchanan (m. 1942)
- Children: 4
- Education: Harvard University (BA)

Military service
- Branch/service: United States Marine Corps
- Rank: Lieutenant colonel
- Battles/wars: World War II

Donald Thomas Regan (Note: Pronounced /ˈriːɡən/ REE-gən) (December 21, 1918 – June 10, 2003) was an American government official and business executive who served as the 66th United States secretary of the treasury from 1981 to 1985 and as the 11th White House chief of staff from 1985 to 1987 under President Ronald Reagan.

Regan studied at Harvard University before he served in the U.S. Marine Corps, achieving the rank of lieutenant colonel. In 1946, he began to work for Merrill Lynch, serving as its chairman and CEO from 1971 to 1980. In the Reagan administration, Regan advocated "Reaganomics" and tax cuts as a means to create jobs and to stimulate production.

== Early life and education ==
Donald Regan was born in Cambridge, Massachusetts, the son of Kathleen (née Ahearn) and William Francis Regan. Regan earned his Bachelor of Arts in English from Harvard College in 1940 and attended Harvard Law School before dropping out to join the Marine Corps at the outset of World War II. He reached the rank of lieutenant colonel while he was serving in the Pacific Theater. He was involved in five major campaigns, including Guadalcanal and Okinawa.

In 1942, Regan married the former Ann George Buchanan, with whom he had four children: Donna Regan Lefeve, Donald T. Regan Jr., Richard William Regan, and Diane Regan Doniger.

== Merrill Lynch ==
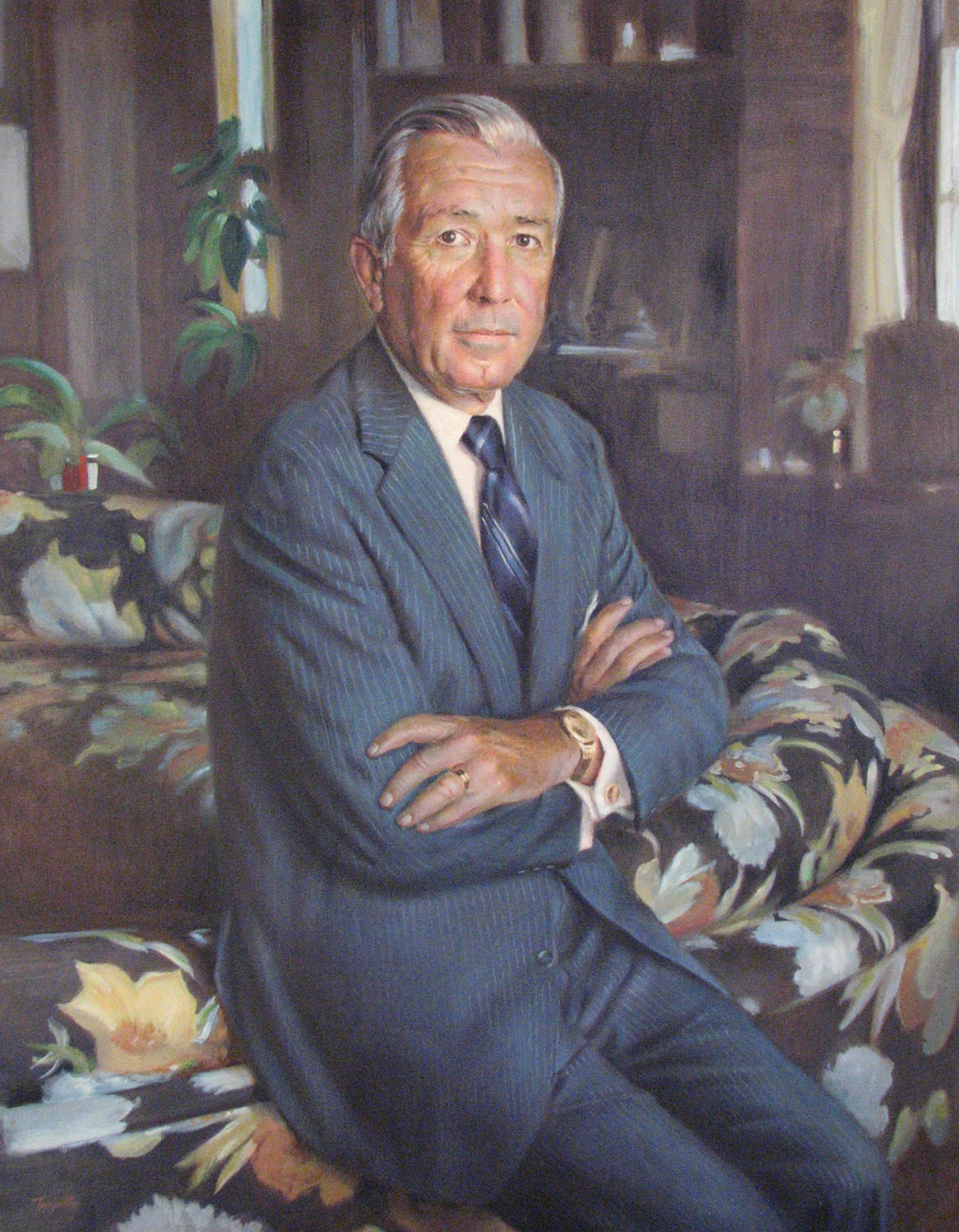
1981 portrait of Regan as Merrill Lynch's CEO

After the war, Regan joined Merrill Lynch in 1946 as an account executive trainee. He worked up through the ranks, eventually taking over as the firm's chairman and CEO in 1971; he held those positions until 1980.

Regan was one of the original directors of the Securities Investor Protection Corporation and was vice chairman of the New York Stock Exchange from 1973 to 1975. He was a major proponent of brokerage firms going public, which he viewed as an important step in the modernization of Wall Street. Under his supervision, Merrill Lynch had its initial public offering on June 23, 1971, becoming the second Wall Street firm to go public after Donaldson, Lufkin & Jenrette.

During his tenure in these two positions, Regan pushed hard for an end to minimum fixed commissions for brokers, which were fees that brokerage companies had to charge clients for every transaction they made on the clients' behalf. Regan saw them as a cartel-like restriction. His lobbying played a large part of fixed commissions being abolished in 1975.

== Reagan administration ==
President Ronald Reagan selected Donald Regan in 1981 to serve as treasury secretary, marking him as a spokesman for his economic policies, dubbed "Reaganomics". He helped engineer changes in the tax code, reduce income tax rates, and decrease taxes for corporations. Regan unexpectedly swapped jobs with then White House chief of staff James Baker in 1985.

As chief of staff, Regan was closely involved in the day-to-day management of White House policy, which led Howard Baker, Regan's successor as chief of staff, to give a rebuke that Regan was becoming a "prime minister" inside an increasingly-complex imperial presidency. During his four years as Secretary of the Treasury, Regan did not have a single one-to-one meeting with the president. Regan was forced to resign for repeatedly disagreeing with the First Lady and for his role in the Iran–Contra affair. The Tower Commission, established by President Reagan to investigate the scandal, concluded that Regan was responsible for the "chaos" that took hold of the White House. "More than almost any Chief of Staff in recent memory, he asserted control over the White House staff and sought to extend this control to the National Security Adviser. He was personally active in national security affairs, and attended almost all the relevant meetings regarding the Iran initiative. He, as much as anyone, should have insisted that an orderly process be observed."

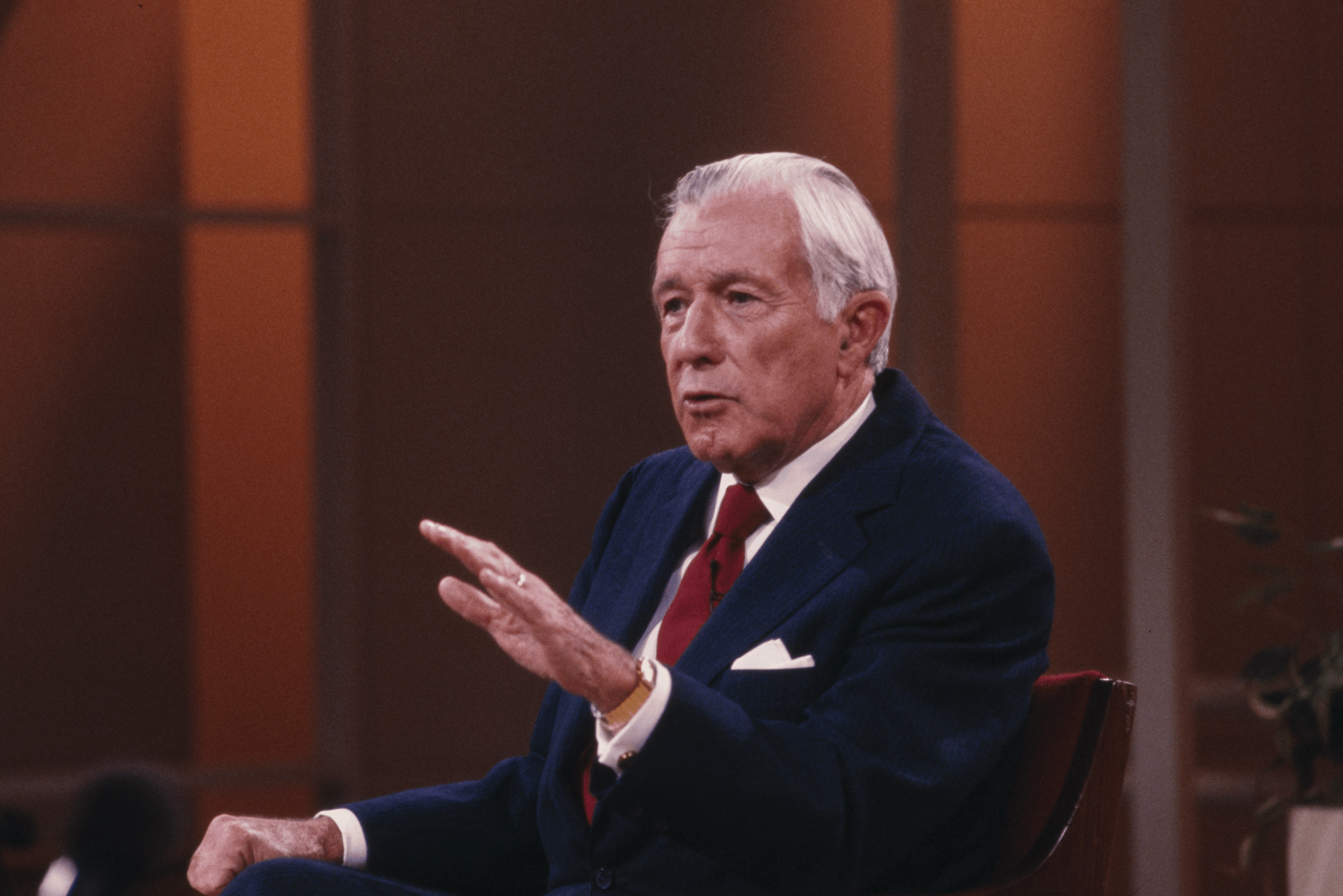
Regan in 1988

Regan's 1988 memoir, For the Record: From Wall Street to Washington, exposes his disagreements with first lady Nancy Reagan, revealing publicly that she had a personal astrologer who was later revealed to be Joan Quigley with whom she consulted and who helped steer the president's decisions. Regan wrote:

Virtually every major move and decision the Reagans made during my time as White House Chief of Staff was cleared in advance with a woman in San Francisco [Quigley] who drew up horoscopes to make certain that the planets were in a favorable alignment for the enterprise.

Ronald and Nancy Reagan denied that astrology influenced any policies or decisions.

== Retirement ==
Regan retired quietly in Virginia with Ann Regan, his wife of over 60 years. In later life, he spent nearly 10 hours a day in his art studio painting landscapes. He had four children and nine grandchildren.

== Death ==
Regan died of cancer on June 10, 2003, at the age of 84, in a hospital near his home in Williamsburg, Virginia. His remains were interred at Arlington National Cemetery.

== Sayings ==
In the portrait of Regan that hangs on the third floor of the treasury, the title of a book in the background reads And the Horse You Rode In On.

"You've got to give loyalty down if you want loyalty up."

== Books ==
- Regan, Donald T. For the Record: From Wall Street to Washington (1988)

== Notes ==
Political offices
Preceded by G. William Miller	United States Secretary of the Treasury; 1981–1985	Succeeded by James Baker
Preceded by James Baker	White House Chief of Staff; 1985–1987	Succeeded by Howard Baker
