= Live from the Red Carpet =

American television series

Live from the Red Carpet is an event television series on E!. It airs in the hours before a major awards ceremony, covering the arrival of stars outside a ceremony's venue upon its red carpet, as well as interviews and fashion highlights. The show was hosted by Ryan Seacrest and Giuliana Rancic from 2006 to 2021. Starting in 2022, it will be hosted by Laverne Cox.

The program airs the day of every major award show (Primetime Emmy Awards, Golden Globe Awards, Academy Awards, Screen Actors Guild Awards and Grammy Awards) and have three other programs that correspond with it:

- Countdown to the Red Carpet: Commentary on nominees and coverage of behind-the-scenes preparations. Insider interviews, swag-suite peeks, expert predictions and more
- Live Post Show-E! After Party: E! talks up all the big winners and highlights of the night
- Fashion Police: takes a look at the best dress and worst dress fashion of the night with Melissa Rivers as host.

In 2005, TV Guide channel begin airing its own red-carpet pre-show. The program got Joan Rivers and her daughter Melissa Rivers to host the program for a reported $8 million for three years.

The British edition is aired for the British Academy Film Awards and is hosted by Dermot O'Leary and Fearne Cotton.

== Hosts ==
=== British hosts ===
- Steve Jones (2011)
- Kimberley Walsh (2011)
- Dermot O'Leary (2012–present)
- Fearne Cotton (2012–present)

=== Past hosts ===
- Joan Rivers (1996–2004) (as interview host)
- Joan Rivers (2009–2014) (Fashion Police)
- Melissa Rivers (1996–2004)
- Star Jones (2004–2005)
- Kathy Griffin (2004–2005)
- Nicky Hilton (2004)
- Debbie Matenopoulos (2006–2009)
- Jason Kennedy (2017–2020)
- Ryan Seacrest (2006–2020)
- Giuliana Rancic (2004–2021)
- Alexander von Roon (2006–2020) – German version and German voice of Ryan Seacrest
- Laverne Cox (2022–2024)
