= Carroll Righter =

American astrologer (1900–1988)

Carroll Righter (February 2, 1900 – April 30, 1988) was an American astrologer, author and columnist who called himself "the gregarious Aquarius". He wrote several books and a syndicated daily advice column for 166 newspapers around the world and was reputed to be an advisor to Ronald and Nancy Reagan.

== Biography ==
Righter, who liked to be called "the gregarious Aquarius," began doing charts for Hollywood notables in 1938 and became a columnist in 1950. Before that, he had been a lawyer in Philadelphia. He is the author of the horoscopes analyzed by Theodor W. Adorno in his essay "The Stars down to Earth" (1957).

During Reagan's presidency, according to former White House Chief of Staff Donald T. Regan, Nancy Reagan turned to astrologers to help determine the president's schedule. Asked specifically whether he believed in astrology, Ronald Reagan said, "I don't guide my life by it," but added, "I don't know enough about it to say, is there something to it or not...and I don't mean to offend anyone who does believe in it, or engages in it." When Righter, whom Ronald Reagan had mentioned in his 1965 autobiography Where's The Rest of Me?, was asked in 1985 if he consulted with Reagan on astrology, he replied, "No comment."

Righter claimed he had warned Marlene Dietrich to avoid working on a studio set one day because she might get hurt. His advice was not heeded, and Dietrich broke an ankle while reaching out to save a falling child. Word of the accident and Righter's advice led other celebrities to the astrologer, ensuring his fame. Among those who sought his advice were Arlene Dahl, Rhonda Fleming, Jane Withers, Hildegard Knef, Joan Fontaine and Grace Kelly. At one point in the late 1930s, the then-young Robert Mitchum worked as a ghostwriter for Righter.

Righter wrote several books, including Astrology and You, the Astrological Guide to Health and Diet, and the Astrological Guide to Marriage and Family Relations.

Righter died on April 30, 1988, in Santa Monica, California, at the age of 88.

== See also ==
- Joyce Jillson
- Joan Quigley
- Jeane Dixon
