= Joan Quigley =

American astrologer (1927–2014)

- Born: April 10, 1927; Kansas City, Missouri, U.S.
- Died: October 21, 2014 (aged 87); San Francisco, California, U.S.

Joan Ceciel Quigley (April 10, 1927 – October 21, 2014) of San Francisco, California, was an astrologer best known for her astrological advice to the Reagan White House in the 1980s. Quigley was born in Kansas City, Missouri.

She was called on by First Lady Nancy Reagan in 1981 after John Hinckley's attempted assassination of the president, and stayed on as the White House astrologer in secret until being outed in 1988 by ousted former chief of staff Donald Regan.

== Relationship with Nancy Reagan ==
Joan Quigley first met Nancy Reagan in the 1970s on The Merv Griffin Show. After Ronald Reagan became president, and after the attempt on his life on March 30, 1981, Nancy asked Quigley if she could have foreseen, and possibly prevented, the assassination attempt. Quigley answered affirmatively, saying that she could have done so had she been looking at the time, and been part of the White House staff.

After that point, Nancy Reagan enlisted Quigley's astrological advice on a regular basis, and held frequent telephone conversations with Quigley. Explaining why she turned to Quigley, Nancy later wrote, "Very few people can understand what it's like to have your husband shot at and almost die, and then have him exposed all the time to enormous crowds, tens of thousands of people, any one of whom might be a lunatic with a gun.... I was doing everything I could think of to protect my husband and keep him alive."

When Donald Regan took over as chief of staff for Ronald Reagan in 1985, he was informed by Reagan aide Michael Deaver about Quigley and her role. Regan, who frequently quarreled with Nancy Reagan, resigned in 1987 after the Iran–Contra affair. In 1988, Regan published his memoir For the Record: From Wall Street to Washington, revealing that Nancy Reagan had consulted with Quigley, and previously with astrologer Jeane Dixon. Regan claimed that "every major move and decision the Reagans made during my time as White House Chief of Staff was cleared in advance" with Quigley.

The Reagans denied that astrology influenced any policies or decisions. After the leak, Quigley was swarmed with media attention. Of the entire incident, Nancy Reagan said, "Nobody was hurt by it—except, possibly, me."

== Death ==
Quigley died after an illness on October 21, 2014.

== Publications ==
- Astrology for Adults (New York: Henry Holt & Co., 1969)
- Astrology for Parents of Children & Teenagers (New York: Prentice-Hall, 1971)
- What Does Joan Say?: My Seven Years as White House Astrologer to Nancy and Ronald Reagan (New York: Carol Publishing Group, 1990)

== See also ==
- Joyce Jillson
- Carroll Righter
- Jeane Dixon

== Sources ==
- Donald Regan, For the Record: From Wall Street to Washington (New York: Harcourt, 1988)
