= R. T. McNamar =

American businessman

1st United States Deputy Secretary of the Treasury
- In office January 20, 1981 – October 7, 1985
- President: Ronald Reagan
- Preceded by: Position established
- Succeeded by: Richard Darman

Personal details
- Born: Richard Timothy McNamar; April 21, 1939 (age 86) Olney, Illinois
- Political party: Republican

R. T. McNamar (born April 21, 1939) is an American businessman who served as the United States Deputy Secretary of the Treasury from 1981 to 1985. He later served on the Advisory Board of Afiniti. He married Scottsdale Arizona restaurateur Brenda Shrader at the base camp of K2 in Northern Pakistan in 2015.
