= Nick Arcade =

American children's game show

- Genre: Game show
- Created by: James Bethea; Karim Miteff
- Presented by: Phil Moore
- Narrated by: Andrea Lively
- Theme music composer: Dan Vitco; Mark Schultz
- Composers: Dan Vitco; Mark Schultz; Dean Friedman; James Bethea
- Country of origin: United States
- No. of seasons: 2
- No. of episodes: 84; (+3 pilots & +1 unofficial unaired pilot)

Production
- Executive producers: Geoffrey Darby; Andy Bamberger; Brown Johnson
- Producers: James Bethea; Karim Miteff
- Production location: Nickelodeon Studios
- Running time: 23 minutes
- Production companies: Bethea-Miteff Productions, Inc.

Original release
- Network: Nickelodeon
- Release: January 4 – November 6, 1992

Nick Arcade (also stylized Nickelodeon Arcade) is an American children's game show created by James Bethea and Karim Miteff and hosted by Phil Moore, with Andrea Lively announcing, that aired on Nickelodeon from January 4 to November 6, 1992. It aired originally during weekend afternoons, with reruns airing until September 28, 1997. In the first season, the shows were taped in December 1991 and aired in early 1992. It was taped at Nickelodeon Studios at Universal Studios Florida in Orlando, Florida. In Nick Arcade, two teams of contestants played two initial trivia rounds, with the winning team advancing to the "Video Zone" to play against the virtual "Video Game Wizard" of the day.

The show's format combined video game trivia with contestant-interactive virtual reality. The virtual reality games were designed by Bethea and Miteff for Bethea/Miteff Productions and programmed by Curt Toumainian for Saddleback/Live Studios and Dean Friedman (for InVideo Systems). The show was the first in America to regularly intermix live action with animation using a bluescreen.

== Gameplay ==
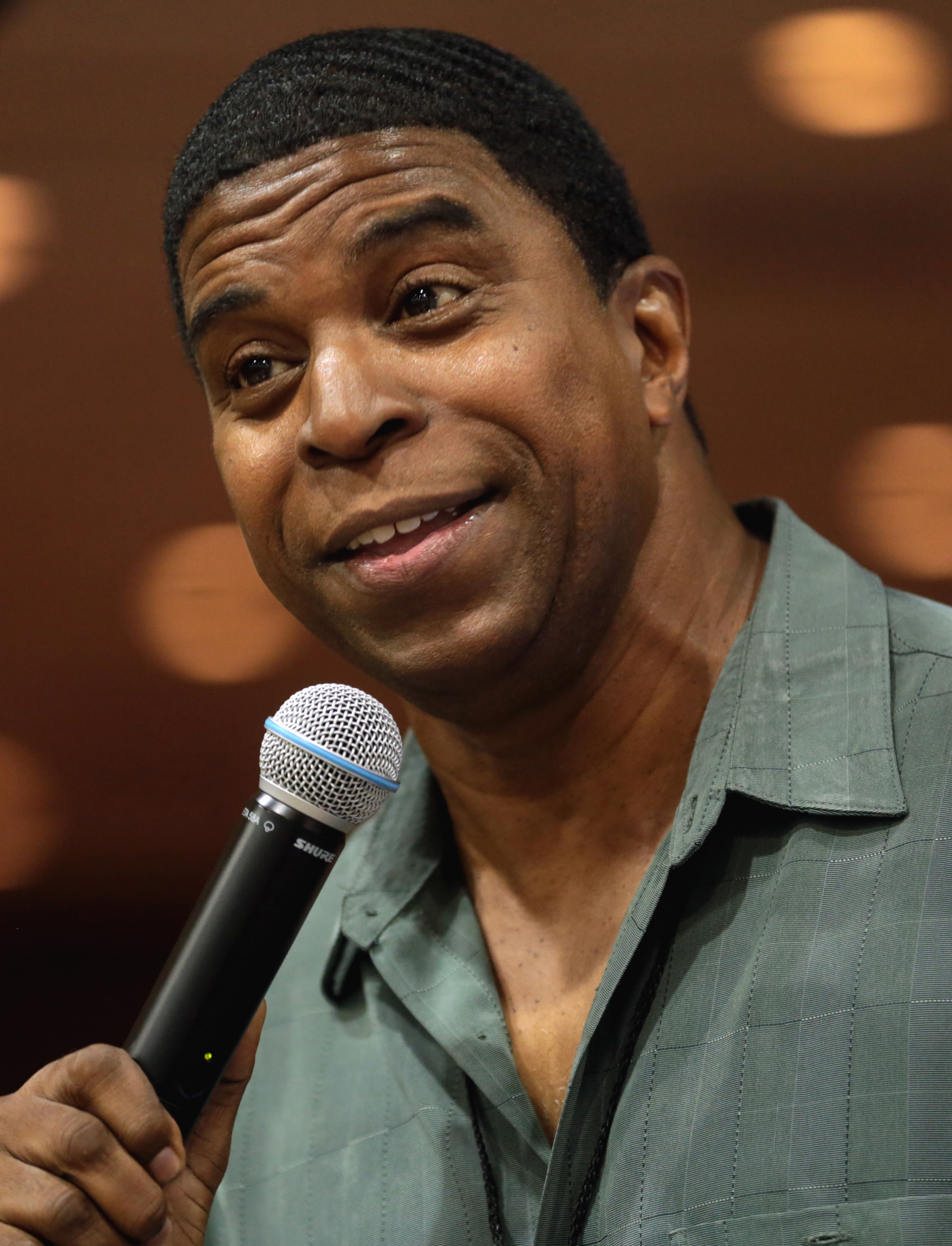
Phil Moore, host of Nick Arcade

Two teams of contestants played two initial rounds, with the winning team advancing to play against the "Video Game Wizard" of the day.

=== Face-off ===
Each round would start with one player from each team playing a video game for thirty seconds. The games here were designed specifically for the show and are listed below.

Game	Synopsis
Meteoroids	Space shooter where players moved crosshairs trying to zap the most flying targets, which included asteroids and ships. The player with the higher score won.
Laser Surgeon	Same shooter-type game as Meteoroids, but with an inside-the-body theme.
Brainstorm	Players tried to defend a brain's neurons from an electrical impulse that ricocheted side-to-side; comparable to a sped-up Pong. The team whose side took the fewest hits won.
Battle of the Bands	Same dodge-game as Brainstorm, but with an on-stage concert theme using speakers and a sound wave bouncing from side to side.
Star Defenders	Same dodge-game as Brainstorm, but with players protecting their spaceships from a comet.
Post-Haste	A side-scroller race-type game where players controlled a mailman trying to dodge obstacles; inspired by Paperboy. The winner was the player whose mailman moved the farthest. Appeared in Season 2 only.
Jet Jocks	Same side-scrolling game as Post-Haste, but with players controlling jet skiers avoiding obstacles along a river. Appeared in Season 2 only.
Crater Rangers	Same side-scrolling game as Post-Haste, but players controlled ATVs, avoiding obstacles on the moon. Appeared in Season 2 only.

These custom Face-Off games were developed by Bethea/Miteff Productions in conjunction with Saddleback/Live Studios and Psygnosis.

The winner of the face-off won 25 (first round) or 50 points (second round) for their team. If the face-off ended in a tie, a toss-up question was asked. The team also earned control of the game's cartoon mascot, "Mikey, the Video Adventurer".

=== Main rounds ===
In the main rounds, Mikey would be navigated over a thematic game-board by the teams. One team was Red, with the other Yellow (the latter, which was traditionally Blue in most Nickelodeon team-vs.-team game shows, was likely changed due to the Video Zone's blue chroma key setup). The game-board was divided into 18 squares, and Mikey was moved around the board in one of four basic directions (up, down, left, or right) toward a "Goal" space on the board. When new squares were landed on, various events would be uncovered, including trivia quizzes, video-based puzzles, bonus instant-win prizes, automatic point-adding squares, enemies and "Video Challenges." The latter involved one player of the team playing one of five video games in an attempt to beat a certain score or accomplish a certain objective within 30 seconds. Regardless of the outcome, both teams kept any prizes won during the first two rounds of the game.

More often than not, the round would end before Mikey reached the goal space, due to time constraints. In such cases, Mikey was moved directly to the goal, and a question was asked; the first team to buzz in with the correct answer received the "Goal" points. After the round ends, the contents of the remaining squares were revealed. Round 2 was played the same way, but with point values doubled.

==== Mikey's World ====
Mikey's World had 11 different areas of exploration. These areas included:

Location	Synopsis
Pirate's Cove	An old-fashioned port area including a skull-shaped island. The sub-areas include Skull Island, Sunken Ship and Pirate's Pier.
Cape Cosmos	A space center that transported Mikey into outer space, where his adventures began for the players. Sub-areas include Space Station Alpha, Planet X and Deep Space.
Camelittle	A medieval-themed area where knights, princesses and dragons roamed and fantasy came alive. Sub-areas include Enchanted Forest and Dungeon of Doom.
Specific Ocean	An underwater exploration area where the denizens of the deep abound. Sub-areas include Aqua City, Sunken Ship, Atlantis and the Beach.
Forgotten Desert	An Egyptian-style area that harbored mystery and intrigue. Sub-areas include Stinky Sphinx and Lost Pyramid.
Slurpy Gulch	A traditional lawless Wild West town with a southwestern feel. Sub-areas include Baby Grand Canyon, El Dorado and Hidden Gold Mine.
Volcano Jungle	A rainforest jungle with a live volcano and a village nearby. Sub-areas include Mount Blowafuse and Jungle Village.
Creepyville	A haunted mansion near a spooky swamp. Sub-areas include Haunted House and Murky Swamp.
Mikey's Neighborhood	A normal suburban neighborhood, home to Mikey as well as a bully nicknamed "Game Over." Sub-areas include Hang Outs and Mikey's Block.
WeGot'Em Mall	A shopping center near Mikey's neighborhood. Sub-areas include Atrium and Plaza.
Time Portal	A vortex that Mikey traveled through, visiting his neighborhood both in the past and the future. Sub-areas include Past and Future

==== Moving Mikey ====
There were eight different types of spaces Mikey could land on:

- The Four Ps ("Points, Puzzles, Pop Quizzes, and Prizes"):
  - Points - The team that moved Mikey was automatically awarded points (25 in Round 1, 50 in Round 2) and kept control.
  - Video Puzzle - Different puzzles were played. The team that solved the puzzle received points (25 in Round 1, 50 in Round 2) and control of Mikey. Examples of video puzzles included identifying the artist in a music video with a scrambled picture and recalling a series of images flashed rapidly on the screen.
  - Pop Quiz - A question was asked that related to the area Mikey was traveling. The teams could buzz-in during the middle of the question. If a team answered correctly, they earned points (25 in Round 1, 50 in Round 2) and control of Mikey. (In early episodes, the team in control of Mikey would choose one of four categories.) If both teams missed a question, another Pop Quiz question would be asked until one team answers correctly.
  - Prize - The team that moved Mikey won a prize and kept control. Any prize the team received was theirs to keep, regardless of the game's outcome.
- Video Challenge - One of the contestants from a team chose one of five video games on stage to play (each of which could be played only once during an episode). The goal was to meet or beat the "Wizard's Challenge" (renamed "Expert's Challenge" in Season 2), which was usually to either get the same exact certain score or higher than the certain score within 30 seconds for the game chosen. The other team member had three seconds (although it usually was not enforced) to write, using a Magna-Doodle, how much of their score they would gamble that the partner could complete the challenge. If the player was able to meet or beat the challenge, the wager was added to their score, and the team kept control of Mikey. If not, they lost the wager, and the other team gained control. Teams could wager any amount from zero to their current score or the value of one question in that round, whichever was greater. In the event the other team member wagered more points than their current score, the wager was rounded down to their current score, only if the challenge was won. Each game could be played only once during an episode, and when it was chosen, the marquee light was turned off (though the game continued to run in attract mode). Only games with constantly visible on-screen score displays were used. Short descriptions of each game were read after being selected starting in season 2. At least one Video Challenge was played in each episode, with as many as four Video Challenges played in an episode. Consoles used for this part of the show were the Nintendo Entertainment System, Super Nintendo Entertainment System, Sega Genesis, TurboGrafx-16 and Neo Geo.
- Enemy - An animated enemy, which changed with the setting of the game board and "attacked" Mikey. Landing on an enemy square forfeited control to the opposing team. Examples include the town bully named Game Over in "Mikey's Neighborhood", and a genie named Djinni (the same pronunciation as "G-E-N-I-E") in "The Forgotten Desert".
- Time Bomb - In the rare occurrence that Mikey moved to a space that had already been landed on, a "Time Bomb" would occur. The team controlling Mikey had to correctly "pong-spell", alternating letters back and forth between team members, a word in 10 seconds. If a team correctly pong-spelled a word, they kept control. If not, the other team would gain control. Regardless of the outcome, the points stayed the same.
- Goal - The Goal worked in one of two ways:
  - If the team that moved Mikey moved him to the Goal, they alone were asked a question based on a category their opponents chose from a list of four categories (three in season 2). A correct answer earned the team double the points the regular questions were worth (50 points in Round 1, 100 points in Round 2) and the Goal for that round. If they answered incorrectly or took too much time, the opponents got half the points (25 in Round 1, and 50 in Round 2) available and the Goal by default.
  - If time ran out before Mikey reached the goal, a sudden death Pop Quiz question was asked for double the points the regular questions were worth (50 points in Round 1, 100 points in Round 2).

The team with the most points at the end of two rounds won the game. If the game ended in a tie, a 100-point tiebreaker question was asked. The winning team advanced to the Video Zone. The losing team received consolation prizes as well as any other prizes acquired during the game.

=== The Video Zone ===
The Video Zone was a live-action video game with three levels. Using a video monitor to see themselves, the contestants would be backstage, climbing ladders, throwing "snowballs", and using a boat in front of a bluescreen attempting to achieve previously explained goals (which was always to obtain three objects) for each level of the game.

As in a traditional video game, players could be "damaged" by hazards and enemy characters. If they lost all of their power (five units, as shown by an on-screen gauge), the screen would fade to grey, and they would have to start the stage over and repeat its objectives until successful (in season 1, six episodes had a message that read "Try again. Press START to continue."). In addition, each level contained a 'power-up' that appeared periodically that, when touched, gave the player an added advantage in that level—destroying all onscreen enemies, freezing enemies for 5 seconds (rendering them harmless), restoring the team's power meter to maximum, etc.

The team had 60 seconds to clear all three levels. Each item touched won the team $50 to split, and each level cleared won a prize of increasing value. Successfully beating the Game Wizard in the final level won the grand prize, which was usually a vacation. If a level's objective was met in the time limit, the words "Level Completed" appeared on the screen, which moved to the next level. If time ran out before the team completed the game, the losing horns sounded in the style of an evil laugh, the screen faded to red, and the words "GAME OVER" appeared on the screen.

==== Level 1 ====
- Jungle Fever: A jungle setting where the player climbed palm trees to obtain three bunches of bananas at the top while avoiding coconut-throwing monkeys, as well as toucans, piranhas (seen once the player was above the waterfall) and snakes. The player could go behind the waterfall, or touch a golden idol to cause a rope to appear to help cross the waterfall safely.
- Alien Moonbase: An intergalactic mechanical building where the player had to turn off three anti-matter reactors, while trying to avoid steam vents and attacking robots. Touching the main computer would immobilize all enemies and hazards, rendering them harmless for five seconds, and would also activate a "light bridge", which made the reactors easier to reach.
- Ancient Tomb: A Mayan temple where the player had to grab three coins on both levels while trying to avoid bats, a statue's hammer, arrows shot from the ground, fireballs, and a mummy. Touching a beam of sunlight eradicated all enemies and unlocked all doors, revealing the hidden coins. (This level appeared in season 1 only.)

===== Season 2 only =====
- Monsters on the Loose: A city besieged by alien UFOs, where now the giant player had to rescue three humans from being abducted by the UFOs, while avoiding monsters such as a giant laser-firing eyeball, a slimy earth-burrowing creature, and a monstrous cockroach. Touching a power rod released cosmic radiation, clearing the screen of all enemies and thus leaving the player unhindered for a few seconds.
- Haunted Museum: A haunted mansion scene, where the player was required to pick up three statue busts hidden inside moving bookcases, while avoiding monsters such as a gargoyle, grasping tentacles, a vampire, and the "Hand of Doom". Pulling back a curtain bathed the room in sunlight, destroying all enemies and thus leaving the player unhindered for a few seconds.

==== Level 2 ====
- Runaway Rail Car: The player traveled on a railway car through a Wild West town and abandoned mines; he or she had to obtain three coins while avoiding vultures, hanging timbers, cactuses, tumbleweeds and rats. If the player touched a green "luck stone," he or she regained full power. (This level appeared in season 1 only.)
- Nile River Raft: The player, floating on a fast-moving Egyptian river with a wooden raft, had to grab three gems while avoiding flies, alligators, rats, vultures and a mummy. Touching the legendary "Eye of the Pharaoh" diamond restored full power.
- Mine Maze: A Mayan room gauntlet where the player had to collect three coins while dodging fireballs, spears, and electrified floor tiles. If the player touched a "Power" tile, he or she was granted immunity to all damage for a few seconds.
- Cliffhanger: Taking place on a cliff with a network of caves, the player had to clear the cave openings to find three coins while avoiding rock slides, snakes, vultures and giant lizards. Touching a TNT device blasted open the cave openings, thus revealing all the coins.
- Food Frenzy: A school lunch room setting where a food fight was taking place. The player had to grab three textbooks scattered on the floor, while avoiding flying food and the gym coach. Opening a locker with stinky gym shoes stopped the chaos for five seconds.

===== Season 2 only =====
- Sub Search: An ocean scene with the player in a waverunner; the player had to collect three treasure chests while avoiding dangers such as sharks, eels, giant lobsters, explosive mines and squids. Touching a nuclear power cell, however, restored all power.
- Enchanted Flight: A magic carpet scene, where the player had to grab three rings while avoiding swordsmen, gate traps, cobras, a royal guard, a baby dragon, guard dogs, and a genie that shot lightning bolts (the same Djinni from the Forgotten Desert in Mikey's World). Touching a magic lamp restored the player's health.
- Snow Slingers: An arctic scene where the player had to hit three elves with snowballs while dodging those of the elves. The player also had to avoid skiing foxes, and hitting an ice-skating polar bear by mistake. Hitting a snowman made it play a song that forced the elves to stop attacking and dance in place for five seconds, making them much easier to hit.

==== Level 3 aka The Wizard Level ====
Both players, sharing one energy gauge, teamed up for the last level, which was a face-off against one of three villains, the evil wizard Merlock who conjured lightning bolts, a fireball-throwing sorceress named Scorchia, and the armor-clad monster Mongo who tossed balls of energy. To defeat them, the players had to touch three orbs before time expired, while trying to avoid the Game Wizard, the enemy projectiles, the ghostly creatures flying around the room, and the beams of lightning, fire, or energy (depending on who the Wizard was) that erupted from the ground. If either player touched a spinning hourglass that randomly appeared, all enemies and hazards would be immobilized and rendered harmless for five seconds.

Upon the Wizard's defeat, depending on who the players faced, Merlock would disintegrate into a pile of dust, Scorchia's body would burn to ashes and blow away, and Mongo would vanish in a flash of light, leaving only his armor behind. The message "You did it! You beat the game." would appear across the screen.

In Season 1, the Wizards had nearly identical rooms (with only different color schemes depending on the Wizard with Merlock in a purple room, Scorchia in a red-orange room, and Mongo in a green room). In Season 2, the mechanics were the same as before, but each Wizard was given a more customized room:

- Merlock's lair has bubble-like objects
- Scorchia's lair has crystals
- Mongo's lair is a frosty snow cave

== Pilot ==
The show taped four pilots, with a videotape of one of the episodes available. The format was basically the same, but there were some differences. Niells Schurman and Fran Gauchi were the host and announcer. The episode was taped on the same set as Get the Picture. The team colors were red and blue. The face-off games were much slower. The theme music was the same theme from a previous Nickelodeon show, Outta Here. The sound effects were from Double Dare and Get the Picture. Mikey was animated differently and had no music when he moved to a square. One of the Enemy squares was revealed to the teams before the round started. The Video Challenge was called "Arcade." The team that landed on the square sent one player on stage to choose from seven available games while the other player stayed at the podium to write down the wager instead of both players coming down, and wager is written on a piece of paper instead of a magnetic board. The games were set up in customized TV cabinets instead of arcade style cabinets. Also, games could be played more than once, instead of only being available once a day. The Time Bomb challenge was considered a Video Puzzle and instead of spelling words, required teams to come up with multiple answers to a specific question. The Video Zone was four levels instead of three, with no Wizard in the final level. When a contestant completed a level, the clock would stop, with the host revealing statistics, before the next level began.

== Notable celebrities ==
- Joey Fatone, later a member of *NSYNC, appeared on season 1, episode 14 of the show as a contestant (using his full given name, Joseph). He and his partner, Danielle, did not make it to the Video Zone.
- The casts of Clarissa Explains It All, Salute Your Shorts, and Welcome Freshmen appeared on three special celebrity episodes to compete for charity during Season 2. In the Salute Your Shorts episode, the game was played as per the normal rules; however in the other two episodes both teams advanced to the Video Zone while Salute Your Shorts had just the winning team moving on.

== Reruns ==
The series aired in reruns for five additional seasons on Nickelodeon. For many years, it aired on early weekday mornings.

The series was a part of the Nick GAS channel from its launch in 1999 to the channel's shut down in 2007. A handful of episodes were pulled from rotation due to music rights and clearance issues.

From 2021 to 2025, the series was available to stream on Paramount+ with many of the episodes pulled from the Nick GAS rotation returning.

== Attempted revival ==
In 2015, James Bethea and Karim Miteff proposed a spiritual successor to Nick Arcade on Kickstarter, called Enthlevel. The proposed show would again be hosted by Phil Moore, and update the chroma key technology of the original to incorporate modern advancements in motion capture and virtual reality. The Kickstarter was not able to meet its proposed US$350,000 goal, leaving the revival abandoned.
