= Molly Pesce =

American actress (born 1963)

- Born: 1963 (age 61–62)
- Other names: Molly Scott
- Occupation: Television actress

Molly Pesce (a.k.a. Molly Scott) (born c. 1963) is an American actress. In 1989 she began her acting career as host of the Nickelodeon variety show Total Panic. She is the host of Animal Planet's Backyard Habitat. She was also one of the co-hosts of the daytime talk show, iVillageLive in its first season in Orlando. Pesce was also Miss Florida in 1986 and competed at Miss America 1987. She graduated from Lake Brantley High School in Altamonte Springs, Florida, in 1981, and attended the University of Florida in Gainesville, Florida.
