= Geoffrey Darby =

Media executive and television producer

- Born: April 15, 1953 (age 72); Canada
- Occupations: Director, writer
- Known for: Co-creator of You Can't Do That on Television; Co-creator of Double Dare

Geoffrey Darby (born April 15, 1953) is a Canadian media executive, television producer, director, and writer. He was the co-creator of children's sketch comedy You Can't Do That on Television and was a writer and director for the show's first five seasons.

== Career ==
Darby co-created the game show Double Dare for Nickelodeon and hosted the unaired pilot. Some of Darby's other credits include the 1983 American sketch comedy TV show Don't Look Now, UFO Kidnapped, Clarissa Explains It All, and Finders Keepers.

During his career, Darby has been a Senior Vice-President at Nickelodeon, joining the channel in 1984. He has also been Executive Vice President of Programming for The Weather Channel, Executive Vice President of CBS, and President of Production and Convergence for New York-based Oxygen Media Inc. and has had senior positions at Viacom.

He has won three Cable ACE Awards, two Clio Awards, a Peabody Award and a Dupont Award.

== Writing credits ==
Production	Notes	Broadcaster
You Can't Do That on Television	143 episodes (1979–1990)	CTV, Nickelodeon
Don't Look Now	5 episodes (co-written with Roger Price, 1983)	PBS
Whatever Turns You On	15 episodes (co-written with Roger Price, 1979)	CTV
UFO Kidnapped	Feature film (co-written with Roger Price, 1983)	Nickelodeon
