= Blues from the Apple =

Live album by Charles Walker and the New York City Blues Band
- Released: 1974
- Recorded: April 1973 – May 1974
- Genre: Urban blues
- Label: Oblivion Records
- Producer: Honest Tom Pomposello & Fred Seibert

Blues from the Apple, released in 1974 by Oblivion Records, is the only album under the leadership of guitarist and vocalist Charles Walker. Featured players include New York City based musicians Lee Roy Little (piano & vocals), Bill Dicey (harmonica), 'Foxy' Ann Yancey (electric guitar), Larry Johnson (harmonica), Tom Pomposello (bass guitar), Bobby King (rigged snare drum), and Ola Mae Dixon (drums), among others.

The recording of this album began in March 1973 when contemporary country blues musician Larry Johnson was interviewed on Tom Pomposello's WKCR-FM Saturday blues program "Something Inside Me." He introduced Tom—and New York radio listeners—to his friend Charles Walker, and they played a spontaneous acoustic duet. Pomposello sensed a window on a rare breed and immediately made plans to produce an entire album showcasing the New York blues community.

== Recording ==
Producers Pomposello and Fred Seibert held over one dozen sessions between April 1973 and May 1974 at Columbia University's WKCR-FM radio in the Morningside Heights neighborhood of upper Manhattan, New York.

Recording was done live to stereo two track Scully recorders, using Shure, AKG Acoustics, and Georg Neumann microphones, through a custom designed radio recording board. Editing was done manually in Pomposello's living room on a Teac Corporation "prosumer" stereo machine, and at WKCR.

The final edited 2-track tapes were sequenced by Pomposello and Seibert, then re-recorded with slight equalization and echo added by Kevin Behrman at Echo Sound Studio, a now defunct recording studio in Levittown, New York. LP mastering and pressing were done at Wakefield Pressing, Phoenix, Arizona.

== Release ==
Blues from the Apple was released in late 1974. It was the least successful album in Oblivion's short history. Even blues speciality publications ignored the record, in part, speculated the label's owners, because of the incongruous mix of New York City and blues. The album went out of print after its first pressing of 1000 copies.

Currently, there are free MP3s of the LP at the official Oblivion Records archive blog, and downloads and streaming are available at iTunes, MOG (online music), Rhapsody (online music service), Spotify, and Amazon.com, among others.

Release formats:

- LP record (12") record (stereo) [deleted late 1970s]
- MP3 & streaming media (stereo)

=== Packaging, album cover, and labelss ===
On the 1st (and only) pressing of 1000 copies the cover sleeve consisted of very thick cardboard outer sleeve and the 12" vinyl record was protected with a white paper album liner printed with lyrics.

The cover illustration (of an electric guitar playing Statue of Liberty standing on an eaten apple core) and design was by Frank Olinsky, soon to be one of the designers of the MTV logo, and a major label album designer for bands that included The Smashing Pumpkins and Sonic Youth. Photographs are credited to Christine Pomposello, Tom Pomposello, Roy Langbord, John Dunn and Fred Seibert, graphics to "The Oblivionettes" (Seibert) Both sides of the LP labels were printed in the same brown and blue picked up from the album cover.

=== Sleeve notes ===
The liner notes were credited to Oblivion partner Dick Pennington, though the Oblivion blog attributes most of the actual research and writing to producer Pomposello.

== Track listing ==
=== LP Side one ===
1. Scratch My Back - 3:23 (J.Moore a.k.a. Slim Harpo)
2. Black Cat Bone - 2:36 (Lee Roy Little)
3. Gladly - 2:40 (Charles Walker)
4. Decoration - 3:10 (Sonny Boy Williamson)
5. I'm A Good Man But A Poor Man - 2:18 (Cecil Gant/Lee Roy Little)
6. Juice Head Woman - 4:09 (Eddie Vinson/L. Zito)

=== LP Side two ===
1. Bluebird's Blues (Medley) a. Bluebird b. Don't You Ever Get Tired of Hurting Poor Me c. Your Evil Thoughts d. Hurry Baby, Please Come Home - 7:23 (Lee Roy Little)
2. Fast, Fast, Women and A Slow Race Horse - 3:43 (Charles Walker/Sonny Moore)
3. It's Changin' Time - 4:32 (Ann Yancey/Bill Dicey)
4. Meeting You - 5:40 (Charles Walker)

== Personnel ==
All personnel information taken from the Blues from the Apple liner notes unless otherwise noted.

- Charles Walker: guitar and vocals was born in 1922, 51 years old at the time of this release. Raised in Macon, Georgia he began his music career in Newark, New Jersey in 1955, moving to New York the next year to record a single for Danny Robinson's Holiday label.
- Bill Dicey: harmonica met Charles Walker in 1950, playing with him on and off in between gigs with Louisiana Red and John Hammond, Jr.
- Ola Mae Dixon: drums ran a record store in the Bronx at the time of these recordings, and played drums on the side.
- Sonny Harden: bass guitar was a friend of Charles', primarily involved in the management of his son's soul group.
- Goody Hunt: harmonica
- Larry Johnson: harmonica is a country blues musician from Atlanta, Georgia (born: 1938) who introduced Oblivion to Charles Walker. Primarily known for his acoustic guitar playing and singing on Biograph Records and Blue Goose Records, here he plays acoustic harmonica on Decoration Day.
- Bobby King: rigged snare drum is from New Orleans and played with Larry Johnson.
- Lee Roy Little: piano and vocals played regularly with Charles Walker starting in 1959. Known as "Bluebird" (based on his song of the same name) Little was born in Virginia in 1926. He recorded for the Cee Jay label, and co-arranged much of Blues from the Apple with Walker.
- Tom Pomposello: bass guitar produced Blues from the Apple and played bass guitar on the final recording of Mississippi Fred McDowell, Live in New York.
- David Lee Reitman: bass guitar is a songwriter and former radio DJ, who has also written advertising and a number of articles on blues and rock for various music publications.
- Foxy Ann Yancey: guitar gigged with many local New York bluesmen over the years. She co-authored one of the album's instrumentals, It’s Changin’ Time, and contributed to the sessions in the early stages.

== Release history ==
Region	Date	Label	Format	Catalogue
United States	Summer 1974	Oblivion Records	Stereo LP	

== Sources ==
- Hone, Pomposello
