= Johnny Woods =

American singer

- Born: November 1, 1917; Looxahoma, Mississippi, United States
- Died: February 1, 1990 (aged 72) Olive Branch, Mississippi, United States
- Genre: Delta blues
- Occupations: Musician, songwriter
- Instruments: Vocals, harmonica
- Years active: 1959–90
- Labels: Arhoolie, Oblivion, Rounder Records, Fat Possum

Johnny Woods (November 1, 1917 – February 1, 1990) was an American blues singer and harmonica player in the north Mississippi hill country blues style.

Woods was born in Looxahoma, Mississippi, a small town just west of Mississippi Highway 35. His harmonica playing first gained attention in the 1960s, when he was a duet partner with the guitarist and singer Mississippi Fred McDowell. They recorded together for the music historian George Mitchell in 1967, for Chris Strachwitz's Arhoolie Records (King of the Country Blues Vol. 2), for Swingmaster (Blues of Johnny Woods) and as a solo for Tom Pomposello and Fred Seibert of Oblivion Records ("Mississippi Harmonica") in 1972.

Stylistically, Woods's music sprang from the same north Mississippi fife-and-drum blues tradition as McDowell's. However, personal problems kept him rooted in the Delta, primarily working as a farmhand and sharecropper.

After McDowell's death in July 1973, Woods faded into obscurity until George Mitchell paired him again with another Mitchell discovery from the Mississippi Delta, R. L. Burnside, himself a McDowell disciple. They recorded the Swingmaster album and video Going Down South.

Woods died in Olive Branch, Mississippi, in 1990.
