= Spring of Two Blue J's =

Spring of Two Blue-J's

Live album by Cecil Taylor
- Released: 1974
- Recorded: November 4, 1973
- Genre: Free jazz
- Length: 37:48
- Label: Unit Core
- Producer: Bonitza Melodies (Fred Seibert) and AD Icklas (David Laura)

Cecil Taylor chronology
Solo (1973)	Spring of Two Blue-J's (1973)	Silent Tongues (1974)

Jazz View cover

Professional ratings
Review scores
Source	Rating
Allmusic	3/5 stars
The Rolling Stone Jazz Record Guide	5/5 stars

Spring of Two Blue-J's is a 1974 live album by Cecil Taylor, the second set of a "return concert" recorded at The Town Hall in New York City in November 1973. Originally released on Taylor's Unit Core label, bootlegged on European CDs, it was legitimately reissued for the first time in 2022 on global streaming platforms by its original producer, Fred Seibert's Oblivion Records. The LP features one side-long solo performance by Taylor and one side-long quartet performance with Jimmy Lyons, Sirone, and Andrew Cyrille.

== Reception ==
The Allmusic review by Stephen Cook states "The extended solo piece finds Taylor subtly moving from faint, romantic chords into knotty and mercurial ruminations, then ending the piece with tumultuous runs over the entire keyboard. With its keen call-and-response motives, endlessly fertile improvisation, and intuitive shifts in dynamics, this piano exploration qualifies as one of Taylor's best and most accessible. The ensemble version is predictably more intense. While Cyrille compliments and provokes Taylor with his supple and energetic work behind the kit, Lyons alternates between comically detached commentary and frenetic wailing on the alto. Sirone gets lost in the mix, but is heard to great effect on a solo spot at the end of the piece".

== Track listing ==
All compositions by Cecil Taylor.

1. "Spring Of Two Blue-J's" - 16:19
2. "Spring Of Two Blue-J's" - 21:29

- Recorded at New York City Town Hall on November 4, 1973

== Personnel ==
- Cecil Taylor – piano
- Jimmy Lyons – alto saxophone
- Sirone – bass
- Andrew Cyrille – drums

== Recording background and details ==
This concert at The Town Hall was billed as Cecil Taylor's "return" to New York City after a period teaching in the Midwest United States. The concert program notes said:

"This concert marks the return of Cecil Taylor to New York City, his birthplace, to embark upon projects conceived during the past three and one-half year while he held the position of artist and composer in residence at the University of Wisconsin and Antioch College.

"The premiere of the first of these projects will take place at Avery Fisher (Philharmonic) Hall, January 1, 1973. By what can only be termed an ambitious undertaking, it will include the Unit Core, dance, voice, special effects, an ensemble of musicians who have participated in the Cecil Taylor Unit program at the institutions mentioned. Mr. Taylor will be presenting various parts of this project in a series of special programs to take place at the Spring Natural Foods restaurant, 149 Spring Street, in Soho."

Mr. Taylor's self-proclaimed manager, David Laura, arranged the production of the concert and engaged Fred Seibert, Oblivion Records owner and a Columbia University WCKR-FM producer/engineer/DJ, to record the concert for eventual LP release on Taylor's Unit Core Records. Seibert, assisted by Nick Moy and Alan Goodman, brought a portable Ampex 4-track, half inch, tape recorder, mixers, and microphones to capture the performances. The tapes were mixed twice, first at Blank Tapes in the Chelsea section of Manhattan, and then again at Generation Sound; engineering advice was provided by world class engineer Tony May, who'd developed high jazz visibility with a series of recordings first at A & R Recording in New York City and then for Germany's ECM Records. Limited equalization and reverberation were used so as to preserve the acoustics of the original Town Hall recording.

The 1974 LP release was a limited pressing of 2000 albums, independently distributed. The album cover was a solarized photograph by renowned Japanese jazz photographer K. Abe, and the record labels designed by Frank Olinsky (the future co-designer of the MTV logo from Manhattan Design). The record was never repressed or re-released, except in bootlegs of vinyl/digital transfers on obscure European labels. The only other legitimate release of both LP sides is currently available on global streaming services. The original LP was the second half of the concert (titled "Autumn" and "Parade"), but there are rumors that these tracks too might one day be mixed and released.

== Production ==
- Produced by Bonitza Melodies (Fred Seibert) & AD Icklas (David Laura)
- Cover photograph: K. Abe aka Kōbō Abe
- Recording: Fred Seibert with Nick Moy
- Remix: Fred Seibert, Jeff Ader, Alan Goodman at Blank Tapes and Generation Sound, NYC
- Design: Don Mathe and Li Baily
