= The Complete, Legendary, Live Return Concert =

Live album by Cecil Taylor
- Released: 2022
- Recorded: November 4, 1973
- Venue: Town Hall, New York City
- Genre: Free jazz
- Length: 1:46:21
- Label: Oblivion Records; OD-8

The Complete, Legendary, Live Return Concert is a live album by Cecil Taylor recorded at Town Hall in New York City on November 4, 1973, and released in digital format in 2022 by Oblivion Records. On the album, Taylor is joined by saxophonist Jimmy Lyons, bassist Sirone, and drummer Andrew Cyrille.

The album documents an event billed as Taylor's "return" to New York City following a period of several years spent teaching at the University of Wisconsin and Antioch College. "Spring of Two Blue-J's" parts 1 and 2 were originally released as an LP in 1974 by Taylor's Unit Core label in limited quantities, and were reissued in 2021 by Oblivion Records. "Autumn/Parade" was previously unreleased, as its length (88 minutes) prevented it from being considered as a commercially viable issue.

The music was recorded by Fred Seibert, one of the founders of Oblivion Records, who was a Columbia University student at the time, and who used borrowed equipment for the recording. He recalled: "I felt like I was under Niagara Falls with every sound coming at me from 360 degrees and fighting for space in my head." Seibert elected to release the album in digital format in order to avoid the physical limitations of CDs and LPs, and to bypass the difficulties associated with traditional album distribution.

== Reception ==
Professional ratings
Review scores
Source	Rating
AllMusic	5/5 stars
All About Jazz	4/5 stars
DownBeat	4/5 stars

In an article for The New York Times, Alan Scherstuhl called the album "exhilarating," and commented: "the music gushes as if it were an uncapped fireplug... the relentless 88-minute track 'Autumn/Parade' catches the inexhaustible Cecil Taylor Unit in the grip of one revelation after another, playing free jazz... in the purest definition of free... what's most immediately striking on the new release is the Unit's restless, driving polyrhythms, pulsing clots of tones and beats."

Writing for The Wall Street Journal, Martin Johnson noted that the album "showcases a master reaching his peak. Taylor's music doesn't aim to entertain its listeners; it seeks to excite or even exhilarate them. It requires devoted attention, however, lest one get lost in the overwhelming cascades of sound." Johnson described "Autumn/Parade" as "a stunner," and "one of the most remarkable performances of his band... it displays Taylor's distinctive approach coming to fruition."

In a review for DownBeat, Martin Longley wrote: "The Unit produces a rush of highly defined kinetic energy that doesn't let up, mostly careening, but also teeming with precise detail. The rapport between Taylor and Lyons is particularly stunning, as they both contort, entwine and pull apart, their convergence often sounding like radical examples of happenstance."

Thom Jurek, in an article for AllMusic, stated: "The Cecil Taylor Unit performed that evening as if they had broken through all bonds of time and space, abandoning all notions of time keeping... The Complete, Legendary, Live Return Concert offers a staggering aural portrait of Taylor embracing the full dictates of the artistic freedom he would go on to display in so many different settings for the rest of his life, in stellar sound quality... this offering showcases the hyper dimensionality of Taylor's music and his quartet's potential for extending it... a must for any Taylor fan."

In a review for Jazz Journal, Andy Hamilton commented: "It's a raw, visceral musical experience, one of the finest albums of free jazz; the recording quality, for a live event, is excellent. The participants were inspired to white heat... An essential release."

Writing for All About Jazz, Mike Jurkovic remarked: "If the title alone... doesn't blow out those flu-like post-holiday cobwebs in a big hurry, the full, near ninety minute assault on all that was and is holy damn well will... After five years, Cecil Taylor took to his piano... and all hell broke loose! It was a moment in the lives of all those participating that they could instantly equate with, say, where they were when Kennedy was shot. Or Martin. Or Lennon. Or when men thought bigger than assassination and strode the moon. Created vaccines. Conquered fascist powers... 'Autumn/Parade' is impenetrable, hypnotic, impossible to hold, but never look away. Never turn a blind ear to its chaotic perplexities or pass lurid judgement on its more accessible moments. Taylor is unhinged and that can only mean the world will be a much different place when he is done... Adding Lyons, Cyrille, and Sirone makes 'Autumn/Parade' unstoppable, a frenetic, riotous, visionary invention gratefully, gleefully heard here completely for the first time. And it sounds awesome too."

An article at WBGO called the album "a fresh revelation," and noted that "Autumn/Parade" "shows Taylor in unbridled form, with an endurance and energy flow that outpaces even his formidable band members."

David Luhrssen, writing for Shepherd Express, described Taylor's performances: "Grand designs emerged from fragmentary segments, complete with knotty stops and starts. On several tracks, he plays more violently — and faster — than any hardcore punk band."

Writing for Glide Magazine, Jim Hynes commented: "Taylor and his bandmates unleash their pent-up energy on the highly intrigued and ultimately mind-blown audience for almost ninety minutes. These folks endured the weather equivalent of a ferocious hurricane or a dam breaking. One can only imagine them trying to describe what they had just witnessed – a musical event unlike anything they had likely heard. Its unbounded energy, unreal spontaneity, sheer stamina, and its fervent commitment to never letting up speaks to everything and more about Taylor's legendary status as intense, unfettered by convention, and all-be-damned mission of embracing freedom... You owe yourself a listen to this entire performance. It will assuredly be unforgettable."

== Track listing ==
All compositions by Cecil Taylor.

1. "Autumn/Parade" (quartet) – 88:00
2. "Spring of Two Blue-J's Part 1" (solo) – 16:15
3. "Spring of Two Blue-J's Part 2" (quartet) – 21:58

== Personnel ==
- Cecil Taylor – piano
- Jimmy Lyons – alto saxophone
- Sirone – bass
- Andrew Cyrille – drums
