= WKCR-FM =

Radio station at Columbia University in New York City

- New York, New York; United States
- Broadcast area: New York metropolitan area
- Frequency: 89.9 MHz (HD Radio)
- Branding: WKCR 89.9FM NY

Programming
- Format: College radio
- Subchannels: HD2: WWFM simulcast (Classical); HD3: NPR

Ownership
- Owner: Columbia University

History
- Founded: February 24, 1941
- First air date: May 14, 1956
- Call sign meaning: "King's Crown Radio"

Technical information
- Licensing authority: FCC
- Facility ID: 68270
- Class: B1
- ERP: 1,350 watts
- HAAT: 284 meters (932 ft)
- Transmitter coordinates: 40°45′21.4″N 73°59′08.5″W

Links
- Public license information: Public file; LMS
- Webcast: Listen live
- Website: www.cc-seas.columbia.edu/wkcr/

WKCR-FM (89.9 FM) is a radio station licensed to New York, New York. The station is owned by Columbia University and serves the New York metropolitan area. Founded in 1941, the station traces its history back to 1908 with the first operations of the Columbia University Radio Club (CURC). In 1956, it became one of the first college radio stations to adopt FM broadcasting, which had been invented two decades earlier by Professor Edwin Howard Armstrong. The station was preceded by student involvement in W2XMN, an experimental FM station founded by Armstrong, for which the CURC provided programming. Originally an education-focused station, since the Columbia University protests of 1968, WKCR-FM has shifted its focus towards alternative musical programming, with an emphasis on jazz, classical, and hip-hop.

WKCR has been described as one of the premier stations for jazz in the United States, having been involved in the New York jazz scene from its founding; one of its first broadcasts was the earliest performance by Thelonious Monk on radio. Through The Stretch Armstrong and Bobbito Show, it has played an instrumental role in the development of hip hop since the 1990s. It was also one of the first stations in the United States to broadcast salsa music.

The station made its first AM broadcast out of John Jay Hall and its first FM broadcast from Philosophy Hall, where Armstrong had invented FM. In 1958, it moved its transmitter to the DuMont Building on Madison Avenue. Following a decade of bureaucratic struggle against the Port Authority of New York and New Jersey and the Federal Communications Commission, it began transmitting from an antenna atop the World Trade Center in 1985. After the towers' destruction in 2001, the station broadcast for a brief period of time from a backup transmitter on the roof of Carman Hall, before moving to 4 Times Square in 2003, where it remains today. Its studios are currently located in Alfred Lerner Hall.

== History ==
=== Wireless Telegraphy Club ===
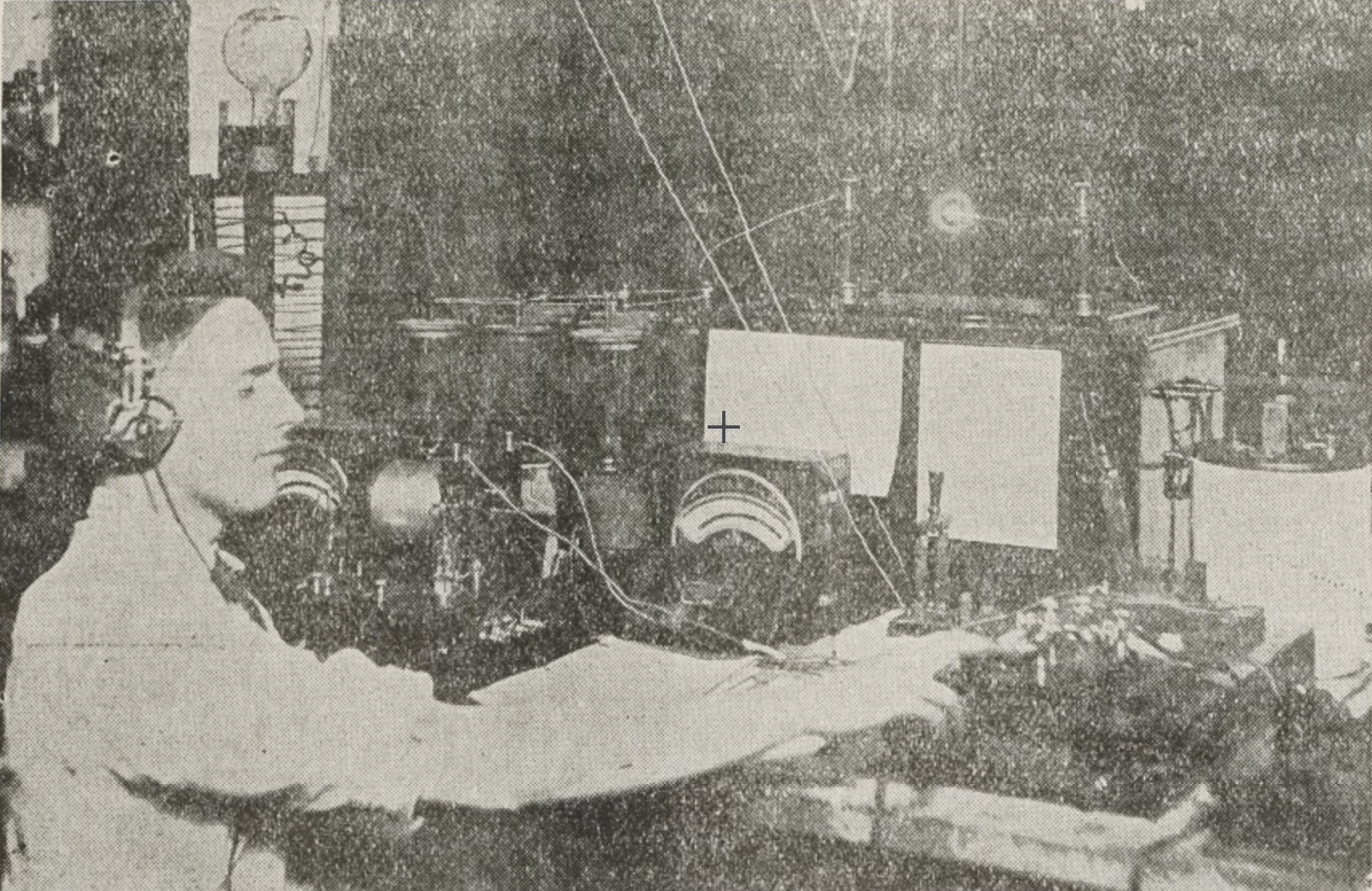
The Columbia Wireless Club receiving station, 1909

The first recorded instance of radio experimentation at Columbia took place in 1906, in the same year as the first AM radio transmission made by Reginald Fessenden. Records indicate that a Columbia University Experimental Wireless Station had set up a cage‑type radio antenna between the chimneys of Havemeyer Hall and Schermerhorn Hall.

What is now WKCR‑FM originated as the Wireless Telegraph Club of Columbia University, now under the name Columbia University Amateur Radio Club. Founded in 1908, one year before the Harvard Wireless Club (W1AF) and the MIT Radio Society (W1MX), it is the oldest amateur radio society. It set up its first experimental station on the roof of University Hall, where Uris Hall now stands, in November of that year with the blessings of Professor Mihajlo Pupin, who donated a corner of his laboratory in Havemeyer Hall to the club, as well a large electromagnetic coil.

Originally intended only for catching stray signals from passing ships, the station was soon used to communicate with stations from other universities and other stations in New York City. It engaged in its first test with the Wireless Association at Princeton University in 1909, and in March of that year, it was used to receive the results of a basketball game against the University of Pennsylvania from The Bellevue-Stratford Hotel in Philadelphia, the first such use of radio by college students.

By 1915, the Wireless Club was known as the Columbia University Radio Club (CURC). The CURC made its first broadcasts with its ham radio station, W2AEE. The call sign was assigned to the CURC as early as 1931 and still operates under the Columbia University Amateur Radio Club. Its first recorded broadcast was in 1933, and the station received its license in 1938.

=== Carrier current AM station ===
CURC broadcasting in 1942

In 1933, FM broadcasting was invented by Professor of Electrical Engineering Edwin Howard Armstrong in the basement of Philosophy Hall. As an undergraduate at Columbia, he had studied under Pupin and invented the regenerative circuit. Immediately after his graduation in 1913, he was offered a position at the university, and continued his experimentation with radios. In 1914, he strung up another antenna between Havemeyer and Schermerhorn Halls for a new radio. At the time, it was considered "one of the best on the eastern coast", and could reportedly receive signals from as far away as Honolulu, Hawaii. Following his invention of FM, Armstrong created W2XMN, the first regularly operated FM radio station, which made its first broadcast on July 18, 1939. Soon after its completion, the CURC began using W2XMN to test the potential of FM for college radio. The CURC made its first public and FM broadcasts on W2XMN, for which it provided programming.

WKCR proper was founded in 1940. The original station was built almost single‑handedly by electrical engineering student William Hutchins in his room in John Jay Hall. Armstrong donated a microphone and turntables to the fledgling station. While setting the station up, the Radio Club engaged in illegal experimentation, exceeding FCC minimum power regulations for carrier current transmission. Under the name CURC, the station made its unofficial debut on December 31, 1940, with a broadcast of audio from a New Year's Eve party in John Jay Dining Hall. Its official maiden broadcast was made on February 24, 1941, and opened with a recording of "Roar, Lion, Roar", followed by light classical music, a 15‑minute sports show, 40 minutes of jazz, a campus news summary, and symphonic music. The station soon moved its headquarters to the space between Hartley Hall and Hamilton Hall.

Within its first year, CURC was broadcasting 18 hours a day, including 10 1/2 hours of rebroadcasts from W71NY and W2XMN. After the FCC officially recognized college radio stations in 1946, the station received the official call sign of WKCR (standing for "King's Crown Radio"); the designation was originally used by a Merchant Marine ship, the SS Miramar.

=== WKCR-FM ===
In February 1956, Columbia University applied for a construction permit for a new 10-watt station on 89.9 MHz. The FCC approved on April 5, and the first tests of the new station were carried out on May 14; full-time programming did not begin until October 8 for New York's third noncommercial radio outlet. It used a ten‑watt transmitter that once belonged to Armstrong, which it installed on the roof of Philosophy Hall, as well as $25,000 worth of master control equipment donated by WMCA. A third of the student volunteers for WKCR-FM were women from the affiliated Barnard College.

Until the 1970s, the carrier current WKCR, focused largely on music broadcasting and restricted to campus, coexisted with WKCR‑FM, which covered the entire New York metropolitan area with a greater emphasis on education. Programming was largely university sports, lecture series, classical music, and broadcasts from the United Nations, including many interviews with representatives of foreign nations.

WKCR‑FM began broadcasting from the DuMont Building on Madison Avenue in 1958, and in 1964 it became the first noncommercial radio station to broadcast in stereo. During the 1960s, the station would continue to develop its educational content. Members of the news department would travel to Washington, D.C. annually to interview political figures, while WKCR became the only station in the New York area to carry United Nations General Assembly meetings in full. While the station's musical programming mainly focused on classical, it also played jazz, folk, bluegrass, and show tunes. Guests who were interviewed on the station during this time period included Martin Luther King Jr., William F. Buckley Jr., and Jimmy Hoffa.

=== The protests of 1968 ===
WKCR reporters broadcast from the steps of Earl Hall, facing the west side of Low Memorial Library, April 1968

During the Columbia University protests of 1968, WKCR was the only source of live news from the university. With 50 or 60 students working in shifts, it was able to provide near-nonstop coverage for the week of protests. During the protests, the station had several "special operations" groups—student experts on telephone systems, key collectors who were able to open every lock on campus, and experts in acquiring telephone equipment that, according to station engineer Jon Perelstein, "a college radio station probably shouldn't have had"—which, by breaking into telephone distribution panel rooms through the university tunnel system, were able to appropriate campus phone lines so that reporters could instantly communicate with station headquarters from any of the occupied buildings. According to one story, when the police stormed Low Memorial Library, a staff member picked up one of the phones and began reporting on the events. When a policeman came over and destroyed the phone he was using, the student simply picked up the phone on the next desk over and continued his report. Station staff also tapped a New York City Police Department phone line that ran from a university telephone distribution panel to a command vehicle outside, and, on radios loaned from W2AEE, stalked frequencies known to be used by the NYPD when planning large operations.

I'm in a room on the seventh floor [of Hartley Hall] overlooking the scene... Candles are being lit in various windows of Hamilton Hall... There has been a lot of egg-throwing... The crowd is milling about... Someone is playing "The Marseillaise"...

— Roger Berkley on WKCR, reported in The New York Times

WKCR coverage only stopped for a period of time on April 26, when the university ordered the station to suspend operations. Students demanded the station be allowed to return to the air, and within half an hour the administration relented. The New York Times described WKCR's reporting as "clear and concise with a sound of informality and immediacy". The station contradicted the narratives offered by commercial news outlets, which only broadcast statements made by politicians and university administrators, by offering student perspectives to its audience. When civil rights activists H. Rap Brown and Stokely Carmichael joined the protests, they were interviewed on WKCR. Following the station's involvement in the protests, the university administration has treated the station with animosity.

After 1968, WKCR sought to rid itself of its reputation as a "classroom of the air". The AM carrier current service was discontinued, while the FM station shifted its emphasis from education to music, particularly jazz. The station sought to provide a platform for music that was neglected by commercial radio, adopting the slogan "The Alternative". In a time when most Latin programming focused on older music and romantic ballads, it became one of the first stations in the United States to broadcast salsa. It also welcomed experimental and contemporary classical music, featuring musicians including Karlheinz Stockhausen, John Zorn, Zeena Parkins, and John Cage, who, in 1987, used the WKCR studios once to remix opera music. During a May 29, 1978, minimalist music marathon hosted by staff member Tim Page, the station presented the radio premiers of several leading minimalist compositions, including Einstein on the Beach by Philip Glass and Music for 18 Musicians by Steve Reich. Page also organized a WKCR charity concert which was held on April 1, 1979, in Carnegie Hall, and featured Glass and Reich, in addition to John Cale, Leroy Jenkins, and Ursula Oppens. David Bowie also made a brief appearance to play a duet with Cale on the viola.

The blues and jazz record label Oblivion Records was based at the WKCR studio from 1972 until 1976, when it ceased initial operations. The label was founded by staff member Fred Seibert, who would later go on to found MTV, along with Dick Pennington and folk musician Tom Pomposello. During his time at WKCR, Seibert recorded and published live performances made at the station; notable albums that were recorded or edited at WKCR include Live in New York, featuring Mississippi Fred McDowell and Blues from the Apple, featuring Charles Walker and the New York City Blues Band.

=== Move to the World Trade Center ===
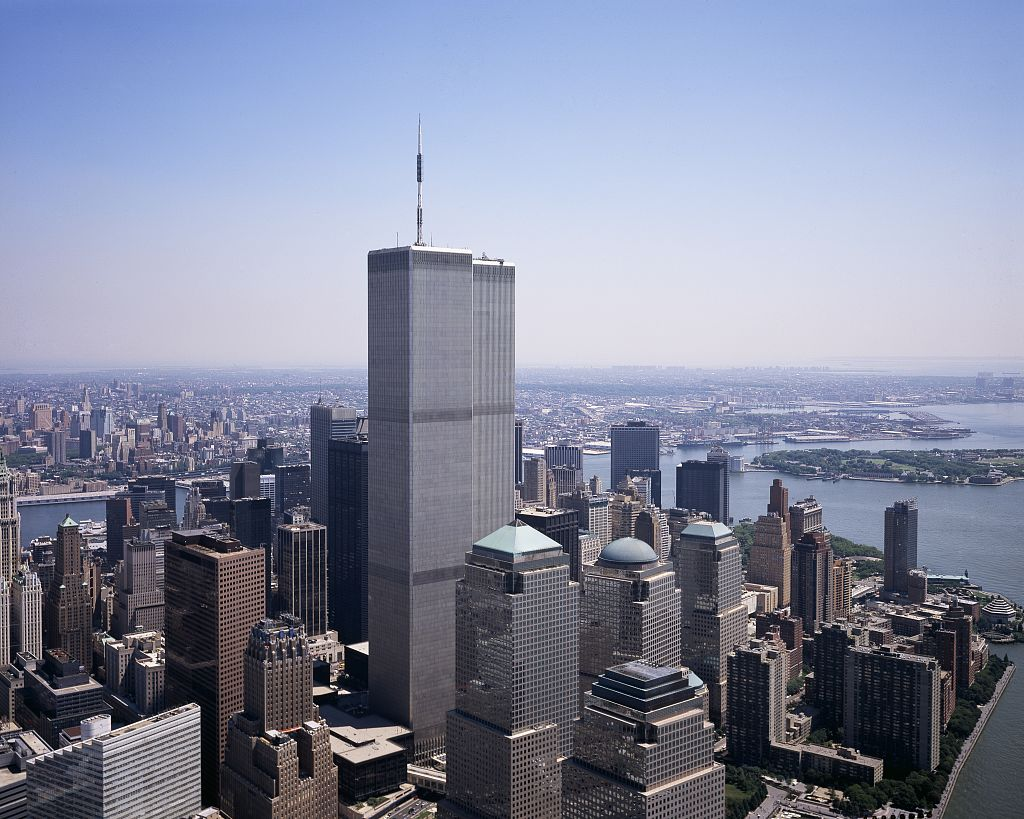
From 1985 to 2001, WKCR broadcast from the antenna atop the World Trade Center

WKCR began making plans in 1975 to move its transmitter to 1 World Trade Center, citing deteriorating signal quality due to the construction of the nearby Citigroup Center. Fundraising was completed in September, and the station was given until March 31, 1976, to build its new transmitter. Due to a bureaucratic stalemate, the deadline was missed, and the station had to apply for a new lease. The Columbia Daily Spectator reported on September 14, 1976, that negotiations with the Port Authority of New York and New Jersey were in their final stages, and that the move was projected to take place before January 1, 1977. In July 1977, The New York Times announced that WKCR would move by September 15 of that year, and would the first station to transmit from the World Trade Center. A nine-day, 200-hour long Louis Armstrong festival was planned to inaugurate the station's new transmitter.

The move was delayed again when the Port Authority declared two of the application forms to be incomplete. The applications were resubmitted, and in November, the Port Authority announced that the station would be able to make the move within a month. However, a day before the station was to install its new antenna, the Port Authority intervened, stating that the antenna was not built to withstand strong enough winds. Despite an earlier agreement that the Port Authority would cover the costs for any transmitter and antenna modification or replacement, when confronted by station officials, the Port Authority refused to pay, denying that the agreement was ever made in the first place. A new antenna, built to the Port Authority's specifications, was constructed in September 1978, and the Port Authority announced that it would grant the station its approval again in a few weeks. In January 1979, WKCR received a $43,912 grant from the Office of Education of the United States Department of Health and Human Services to aid in its move to the Twin Towers. The move was delayed once more until 1981, due to a legal dispute with an unnamed New York‑based station over transmitter interference.

WKCR's Madison Avenue transmitter continued to deteriorate until it finally broke down on July 17, 1981. By then, the World Trade Center antenna had already been installed, though the station's FCC permit to finally move had recently expired while it was dealing with a hum which had interfered with broadcasts for the past three weeks. The station began transmitting from the Twin Towers for the first time at 9:30 a.m. on July 20, though the broadcast was shut down after 45 minutes by the FCC, forcing WKCR to repair and continue to use its old antenna. In July 1982, the FCC fined the station $8,000 for violations of federal equipment and licensing regulation, which were discovered during an allegedly routine and random inspection. The station was accused of failing to replace broken equipment, which had caused the station's frequency to creep up from 89.9 to 89.95 MHz. WKCR Manager Andy Caploe responded that the station could not have known whether there were any problems with the transmitter in the first place, because its testing equipment was also broken.

The station finally made the move in April 1985, where it would continue broadcast from for the next sixteen years.

=== Recent history ===
From 1990 to 1998, WKCR broadcast The Stretch Armstrong and Bobbito Show, hosted by DJ Stretch Armstrong and Bobbito Garcia. The show served as an alternative to commercial hip hop radio, airing mostly obscure, unsigned artists, a number of whom would later dominate the hip hop scene in the late 1990s and early 2000s. The show has been credited with introducing the world to Biggie Smalls, Eminem, Jay-Z, Big L, Big Pun, Fat Joe, Wu Tang Clan, Mobb Deep, and the Fugees, among others. The Stretch Armstrong and Bobbito Show was voted the "best hip-hop show of all time" by The Source in 1998.

WKCR's transmitter was destroyed on September 11, 2001, when a hijacked plane destroyed the North Tower of the World Trade Center. For the next two years, the station broadcast from its backup transmitter atop Carman Hall. Its range was severely reduced, its signal barely reaching past a 20-mile radius until 2003, when the station was able to set up a new antenna at 4 Times Square, where it remains today.

WKCR was one of four FM radio stations that transmitted from the World Trade Center at the time of its destruction, the others being WNYC-FM, WKTU, and WPAT-FM. For three weeks beginning on September 17, WKCR loaned its new studio in Lerner Hall to WNYC, which continued broadcasting over its AM adjunct but could not access its headquarters in the Manhattan Municipal Building due to the attacks. WKCR had been planning on moving to Lerner Hall from its temporary studio in Riverside Church before the attacks.

In 2011, The New York Times reported that it was considering a move back to the World Trade Center.

The station was fined $10,000 in 2012 due to a lapse in its record-keeping from 2001 to 2006, which WKCR directors attributed to the turmoil at the station after the 9/11 attacks. WKCR was one of several college radio stations which had been fined by the FCC in recent years, a practice that was criticized as punitive for its lack of distinction between commercial stations and those run by students, which are generally characterized by high turnover and lower budgets. The FCC's policy towards college stations was relaxed in 2013.

In April 2024, the station suspended its regular programming to cover the pro-Palestinian campus occupation.

On October 10, 2026, the station celebrated 85 years since having received its FCC license as CURC. Over a five week period preceding the anniversary, WKCR produced 14 live broadcasts from venues and organizations across New York, including the Village Vanguard, American Academy of Arts and Letters, Smoke Jazz Club, St. Paul's Chapel, and others.

== Jazz programming ==
=== Early jazz ===
Jazz has been a staple of WKCR's programming since its very founding, in part due to its proximity to Harlem, where bebop was developing during the 1940s. Its first broadcast as an official station with FCC approval began with "Swing is Here", a record with Gene Krupa and Roy Eldridge. After the 1968 protests at Columbia, the station started to heavily emphasize the genre, and has since hosted numerous prominent jazz musicians at its studio. By the 1990s, it had become one of the premier stations for jazz in the United States. As of 2022, about 40% of WKCR's airtime is dedicated to jazz.

In June or July 1941, within five months of its official debut, CURC aired the first radio performance by pianist Thelonious Monk. Jerry Newman, a 23‑year‑old student, had begun frequenting and recording performances at Minton's Playhouse, where Monk was the house pianist, in 1940 after being introduced by bassist and vocalist Duke Groner. The 23 acetate disc recordings he made over 1941 constitute the earliest recordings ever made of Monk's playing. The broadcast recording was made by Newman and several CURC members on one afternoon, with Newman and another student alternating as master of ceremonies. Four sets were recorded featuring Monk, Don Byas, Joe Guy, Kenny Clarke, and Helen Humes, and were rushed back to Columbia and played on CURC in the evening. The recordings were later released as Midnight at Minton's in 1973. In a review, WEMU broadcaster Michael G. Nastos described the recordings as "priceless, the document of a transitional period from swing to bop".

WKCR made the first stereo live broadcast of jazz music in 1960. The performance was by Red Allen's band, in which J. C. Higginbotham was the trombonist at the time, and was broadcast from the university sundial.

=== After 1968 ===
Phil Schaap surrounded by jazz albums at the WKCR studio

Spearheading WKCR's post-1968 transition into a jazz-oriented radio station was Phil Schaap, one of the foremost jazz experts of the late 20th century. He became a disc jockey at the station as a freshman in 1970, and continued to work there pro bono after his graduation until his death in 2021. He was most well known on the station for Bird Flight, a show focusing on Charlie Parker that he started in 1981 and hosted every weekday for about forty years. The New Yorker described Bird Flight as "plac[ing] a degree of attention on the music of the bebop saxophonist Charlie Parker that is so obsessive, so ardent and detailed, that Schaap frequently sounds like a mad Talmudic scholar who has decided that the laws of humankind reside not in the ancient Babylonian tractates but in alternate takes of 'Moose the Mooche' and 'Swedish Schnapps.' " The red Naugahyde armchair for visitors in the WKCR studio is named the "Dizzy Gillespie chair", after the trumpeter sat there during an hours-long conversation with Schaap.

Beginning in 1970, WKCR has held several jazz festivals a year, each one focusing on the presentation of the entirety of a single artist's recorded work, in addition to interviews and educational programming. Festival broadcasts generally last 150 hours or longer, and the longest festivals have included the 2000 Louis Armstrong Centennial Festival Part I, which lasted for 184 hours non-stop from June 30 to July 7, and the 1999 Duke Ellington Centennial Festival, which lasted for 240 hours from April 23 to May 1. Musicians that have participated live in their own festivals include Ornette Coleman (February 1975), Roy Eldridge (January 1978), Sonny Rollins (March 1978), Cecil Taylor (March 1979), Max Roach (March 1981), Steve Lacy (November 1981), Benny Carter (August 1982), Eddie Durham (Summer 1986), Sun Ra (April 1987), Dizzy Gillespie (May 1987), Art Blakey (November 1989), Lionel Hampton (May 1990), and Don Cherry (May 1992). In one notable incident, during the March 1976 festival dedicated to Thelonious Monk, a guest expert was explaining how Monk was able to create extraordinary music by playing "wrong notes" on the piano. Monk, who by this point had become a recluse, called the station and instructed them to "tell the guy on the air, 'The piano ain't got no wrong notes' ", before hanging up.

WKCR annually celebrates the birthdays of prominent jazz musicians, including Monk, Louis Armstrong, and Charlie Parker, by playing the entire catalogue of the artist's work in one broadcast. The station also holds jazz marathons on prominent death anniversaries and other special occasions, such as the beginning of a concert series featuring the Association for the Advancement of Creative Musicians held at Columbia, which the station celebrated with a 90‑hour broadcast starting on May 14, 1977, of the completed recorded works of every member of the organization.

Poet and critic Molly McQuade has praised WKCR's jazz programming, stating that "WKCR's inspired programming feels more like dream logic than traditional radio" and that she is "willingly indebted and harmlessly addicted" to several of the station's programs.

== Incidents ==
When Sputnik 1 was launched on October 4, 1957, WKCR staff recorded its signal during the satellite's first pass over the United States and became the first North American radio station to rebroadcast this signal. The next morning, two FBI agents walked into the station and confiscated the tape. A Freedom of Information Act request was filed on June 28, 2018, requesting the declassification of all documents related to the confiscation of the tapes and their whereabouts. The request was rejected on account of the records having been destroyed in 1975.

Around 1995, WKCR was allegedly interrupted. The interruption reportedly began with eerie screeches and was followed by silence, then by a woman reciting obituaries, including those of Frank Oppenheimer and Barry Valentino, one of the victims of the bombing of Pan Am Flight 103. The woman reading the names would occasionally be interrupted by the sound of a bell. After a couple of minutes, the station came back on air as usual, saying that music will be running a little late but not giving a reason for it. A recording of the incident was uploaded to 4chan in 2013.

== List of staff ==
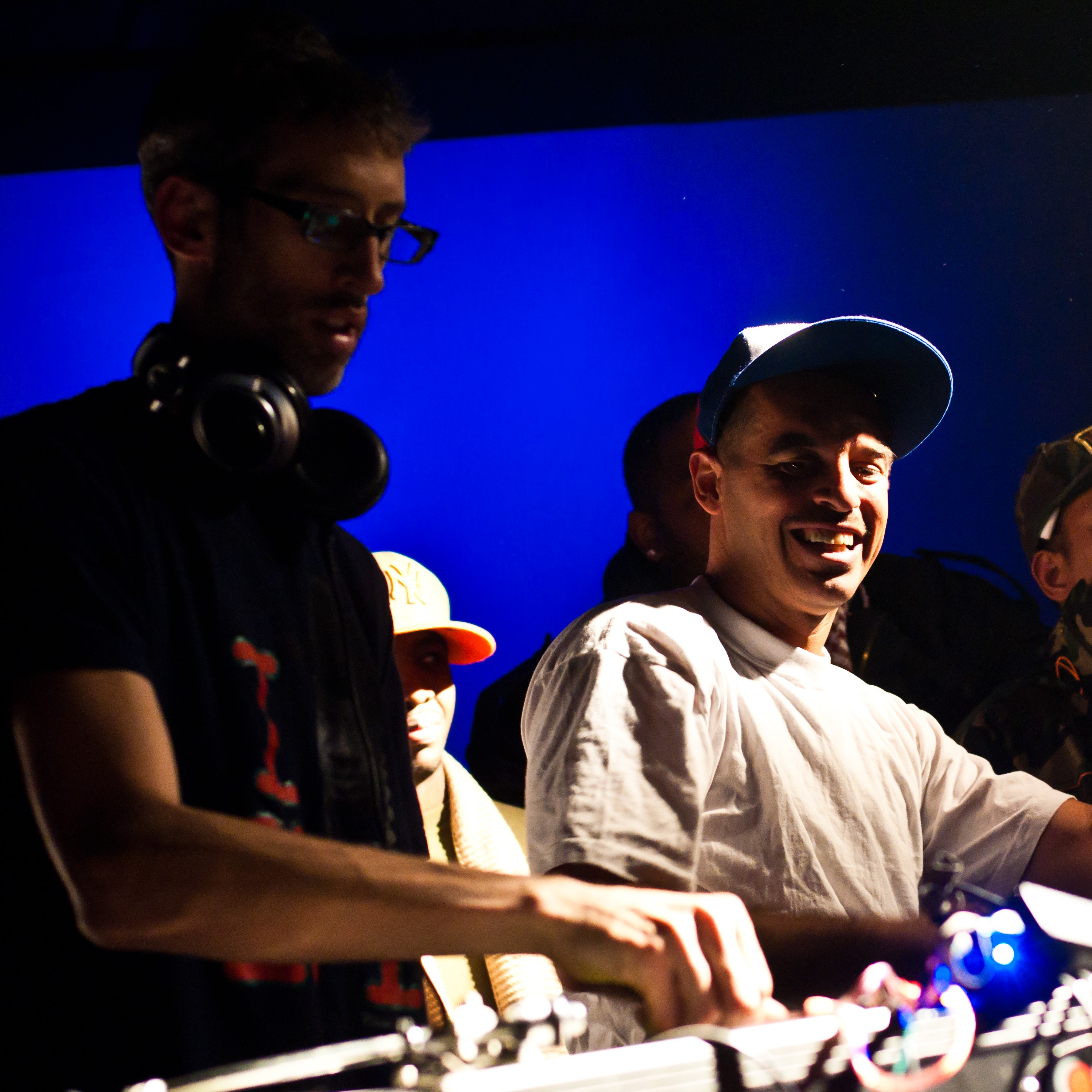
DJ Stretch Armstrong and Bobbito Garcia

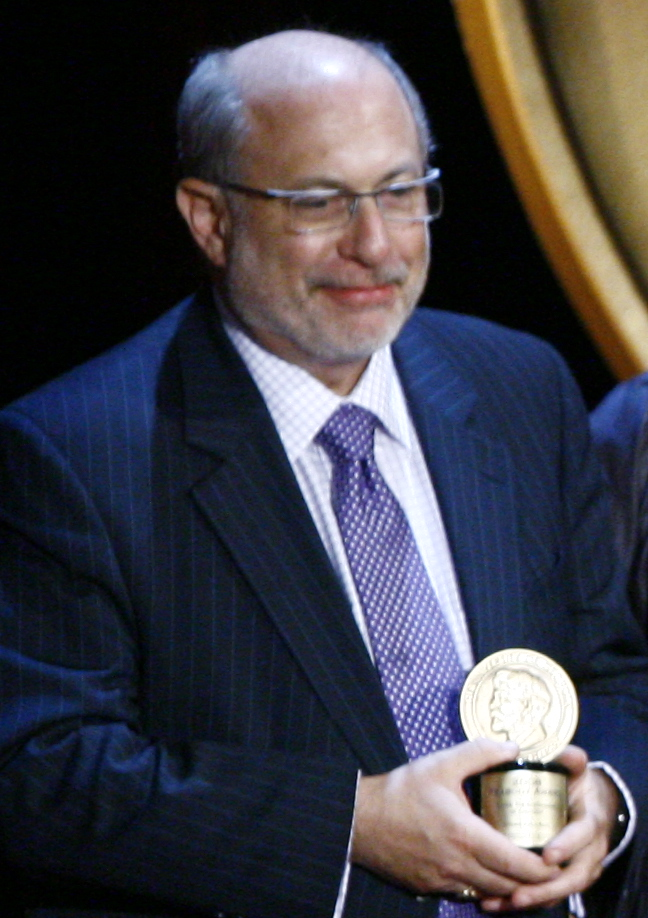
Robert Siegel

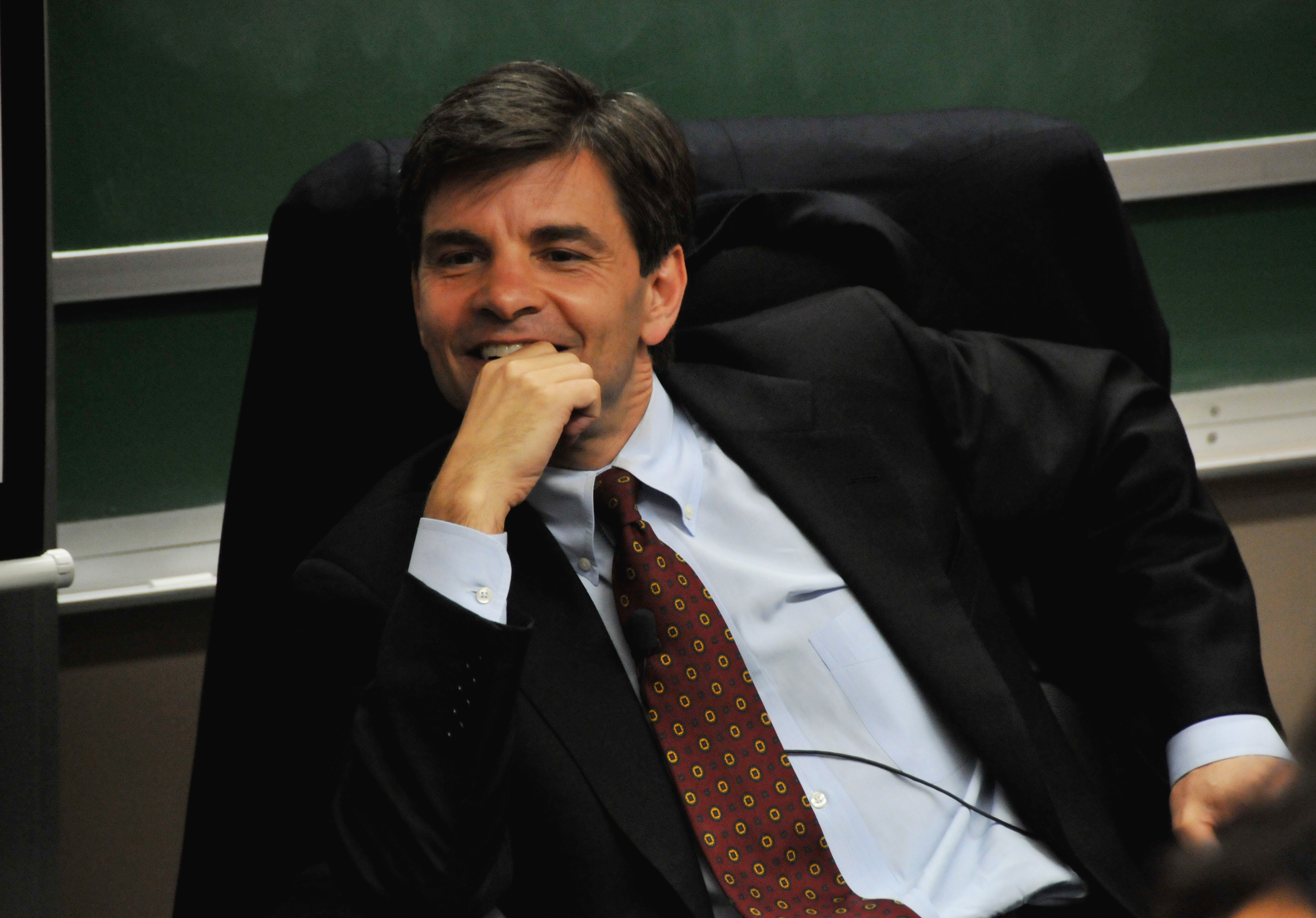
George Stephanopoulos

- Jon Abbott, media executive and CEO of the WGBH Educational Foundation
- Adrian Bartos, co-host of The Stretch Armstrong and Bobbito Show on WKCR
- Timothy Brennan, cultural theorist and literature professor
- Ken Bloom, Grammy-winning theater historian, playwright, and director
- Laura Cantrell, country singer-songwriter and DJ
- Gary Cohen, sportscaster; radio and television play-by-play announcer for the New York Mets
- Stephen Donaldson, bisexual rights and prison reform activist
- Bobbito Garcia, co-host of The Stretch Armstrong and Bobbito Show on WKCR
- Jim Gardner, news anchor for WPVI-TV; reported on 1968 protests
- David Garland, singer-songwriter and radio personality on WNYC and WQXR
- Geologist, member of Animal Collective
- Ted Gold, member of the Weather Underground who died in the Greenwich Village townhouse explosion
- Mark S. Golub, rabbi; founder of the Jewish Broadcasting Service
- Ed Goodgold, known as the "father of trivia"; started one of the first trivia shows in the United States on WKCR after coining the term in 1965
- Alan Goodman, original producer for MTV; creator of Nick-at-Nite and VH-1
- Ashbel Green, book editor and vice president at Alfred A. Knopf
- Albie Hecht, president of film and television entertainment for Nickelodeon; president of Spike TV
- Gary Heidt, conceptual artist, experimental poet, and musician
- Maria Hinojosa, Mexican-American journalist, anchor and executive producer at National Public Radio
- Dick Hyman, jazz pianist and composer
- Soterios Johnson, radio journalist and local host for Morning Edition on WNYC
- Erica Jong, novel, satirist, and poet; author of Fear of Flying
- Clark Kent, hip hop producer and music executive
- Leonard Lopate, radio show host on WBAI and WNYC
- Melissa Mark-Viverito, speaker of the New York City Council
- Peter Mauzey, electrical engineer and developer of electronic music technology
- Joe Mensah, Ghanaian singer, founder of The African Show on WKCR
- Pete Nice, rapper and basketball historian
- Tim Page, music critic for The Washington Post; 1997 Pulitzer Prize for Criticism
- Ted Panken, jazz journalist
- Ayn Rand, conservative writer and author of The Fountainhead and Atlas Shrugged; hosted lecture series on WKCR from 1962 to 1966
- Phil Schaap, six-time Grammy-winning radio host, historian, archivist, and producer
- Martin Scheiner, inventor and founder of Electronics for Medicine
- Fred Seibert, original producer for MTV; creator of Nick-at-Nite and VH-1
- Andrew Setos, engineer; former President of Engineering, Fox Group
- Robert Siegel, radio journalist; host of All Things Considered on NPR; reported on 1968 protests
- George Stephanopoulos, senior advisor to President Bill Clinton; co-anchor on Good Morning America
- Brooke Wentz, record producer and music director for ESPN
- Pete Wernick, bluegrass musician
- Stefan Zucker, opera connoisseur

== In popular culture ==
- WKCR appears in the 2015 film Miles Ahead, in a scene where Miles Davis rebukes Schaap, who played himself, in an angry phone call. The scene was based on a real incident, which took place during the station's 125‑hour long Miles Davis Festival on July 6, 1979, where Miles, who had already made dozens of "mad, foul, strange calls" to the station during the festival's run, discussed Agharta and reviewed his discography with Schaap for nearly three hours before ordering him to play Sketches of Spain.
- The station also appeared in the 2015 documentary film Stretch and Bobbito: Radio That Changed Lives, which depicted Adrian Bartos (DJ Stretch Armstrong) and Bobbito Garcia's time as hosts of The Stretch Armstrong and Bobbito Show on WKCR.

== See also ==
- College radio
- List of college radio stations in the United States
