= Kids' Court =

Television series

- Created by: Alan Goodman; Albie Hecht; Fred Seibert
- Starring: Paul Provenza; Nobi Nakanishi; Asha Canalos
- Country of origin: United States
- Original language: English
- No. of seasons: 1
- No. of episodes: 26

Production
- Running time: 25 minutes
- Production company: Chauncey Street Productions

Original release
- Network: Nickelodeon
- Release: September 10, 1988 – 1989

Kids' Court is a children's television/nontraditional court show aired by Nickelodeon. First airing on September 10, 1988, and ending in 1989, it was hosted by actor Paul Provenza. It was created and executive produced by Alan Goodman, Albie Hecht, and Fred Seibert and produced by Chauncey Street Productions, a division of Fred/Alan, Inc., in New York City.

== Background ==
The show premise utilized grievances made by children mailed to the studio, with each side of a grievance represented by a child in the audience, and at the end of their argument, children in the audience would cheer. The "Judge-o-meter", a cardboard rendering of an English judge (with wig) with peak meters for "eyes", would measure the decibels of the screaming, cheering children, and the side that generated the most screaming and cheering would win the argument. The "Judge-o-meter" system would also be used to sentence the guilty party. Sentences would be suggested by children in the audience. The show sometimes featured expert witnesses testifying for the child; Sandra Hodge appeared in one episode on behalf of a girl whose school would not let her join the wrestling team.

The show also had two courtroom sketch artists during the course of the show (1 appearing at a time), Nobi Nakanishi and Asha Canalos.

During commercial breaks, the show would have quick quiz questions for children, about the legal system. Kids' Court was part of Nickelodeon's "Cable in the Classroom" promotion.

At the closing credits, host Provenza would ask the child audience to "sound off" about what they thought was unfair. He would ask the audience "Fair or Unfair?", wherein the audience would almost always shout "Unfair!" in unison.

Though the series only aired first-run episodes for a year, it continued on Nickelodeon in reruns through 1993.
