= Sam Steinberg (artist) =

American painter (1896–1982)

- Born: May 24, 1896; The Bronx, New York
- Died: Buried April 1982; New York City
- Education: Self taught
- Known for: Painting
- Movement: art brut, outsider art

Sam Steinberg (1896–1982) was an American outsider art painter from The Bronx, New York, called the "unofficial artist-in-residence" at Columbia University by Peter Frank (art critic). His work was "shown" (and sold) exclusively on the Columbia campus, and his style was one of the first identified as "outsider," an approach coined by art critic Roger Cardinal c. 1972, after Jean Dubuffet's art brut.

Suffering from a debilitating hairlessness disease, atrichia with papular lesions, Steinberg was classified 4F in both world wars. In the late 1930s, he and his mother started visiting Columbia daily to sell chocolate bars.

Signed with his distinctive cursive signature, "Sam S.," Steinberg spontaneously began showing and selling original paintings in 1967. He purchased illustration boards and paints from local stationery stores; eventually shifting to permanent magic marker pens. His subjects ranged from animals to popular culture figures like Santa Claus and Elvis Presley, but Steinberg's favorite muses were most certainly his interpretations of cats and "boids." After riding three New York City Subway trains to arrive at Columbia, he was usually carrying three or four fresh paintings (often as many as 20 per week), which, during the 1970s sold for $2.50 (rising to $3.50 by 1980). A campus art institution, it was a rare Columbia College dormitory room that didn't have at least one "Sam" hanging up. His one known example of a commercial use of his paintings was in 1973, for a jazz fusion album recorded by a former Columbia student, Marc Copland (known in his student days as 'Marc Cohen') on a label, Oblivion Records co-founded by another, Fred Seibert. He is known to have painted at least one large oil, "Judy in the sky with kitties." Judy Garland and Kitties were favorite themes. He also produced a series of "miniatures", priced cheaper than his larger paintings. A hallmark of a Steinberg painting was the "almond" shaped eyes of the subjects, placed on a 45% angle on each face.

Through his last decades, Steinberg shared an apartment and his art with his younger sister, colorist Pauline Steinberg.

In its Summer 1996 edition, Folk Art Magazine carried a feature-length article entitled “Sam Steinberg, House of Cardboard or Marble Palace,” presenting the first in-depth treatment of the artist, this appearing fourteen years after Steinberg’s death.

The Fall 2014 issue of Columbia College Today, the alumni magazine of Columbia College, announced the first major retrospective covering Steinberg’s work since the late 1970s. The Exhibition, sponsored by the Columbia College Class of 1975, is currently in its planning phase but is expected to premiere in late May 2015 on the Columbia University campus before moving to other venues across the country.

== See also ==
- Outsider art
