= George Mitchell (music historian) =

American historian

George Mitchell (born January 9, 1944) is an American record producer and music historian.

Born in Coral Gables, Florida, United States, and raised in Atlanta, Georgia, from the 1960s until the 1980s, he recorded blues musicians such as Jessie Mae Hemphill, Fred McDowell, Johnny Woods, George Henry Bussey and Jim Bunkley, Charlie Burse and Will Shade, Gus Cannon, Mississippi Joe Callicott, John Lee Ziegler, Jimmy Lee Williams, Furry Lewis, Houston Stackhouse, R. L. Burnside and Sleepy John Estes, later to be issued on Arhoolie Records (late 1960s), Revival Records (1971) and Rounder Records (from c. 1975) as 33 rpm albums, and then on Arhoolie (2000) and Fat Possum Records (2003 ff.) as CDs. George Mitchell also plays the blues himself on an oil-can bass.

He is the author of the following books.

- Blow My Blues Away (Baton Rouge: Louisiana State University Press, 1971)
- I'm Somebody Important: Young Black Voices from Rural Georgia (Urbana: University of Illinois Press, 1973)
- Yessir, I've Been Here a Long Time: The Faces and Words of Americans Who Have Lived a Century (New York: E.P. Dutton, 1975)
- In Celebration of a Legacy (Columbus: Columbus Museum of Art, 1981)
- Southern Portraits (Bear Creek, AL: Bear Creek Books, 1981)
- Ponce de Leon: An Intimate Portrait of Atlanta's Most Famous Avenue (Atlanta: Argonne Books, 1982)
- Sweet Auburn [with my photography students at Grady High School] (Atlanta: Argonne Books, 1996)
- Mississippi Hill Country Blues 1967 (Jackson: University Press of Mississippi, 2013)
- Ronda: An Intimate Portrait of a Southern Street Prostitute (ebook, Argonne Books, 2015)
