= Revival Records =

Revival Records is a British record label founded in 1971 by Andrew Cameron Miller and Ian Brown to issue the works of blues musicians of the Mississippi valley such as Fred McDowell and Johnny Woods, George Henry Bussey and Jim Bunkley, Charlie Burse and Will Shade, Mississippi Joe Callicott, Furry Lewis, R. L. Burnside, and Sleepy John Estes recorded in the 1960s by George Mitchell.

The Mitchell recordings later have been reissued on the Rounder and the Fat Possum labels.

== See also ==
- List of record labels
