= Larry Johnson (musician) =

American blues singer and guitarist

- Born: Larry Alonzo Johnson; May 15, 1938; Wrightsville, Georgia, United States
- Died: August 6, 2016 (aged 78) Harlem, New York, United States
- Genres: Blues
- Occupation(s): Singer, guitarist
- Instrument(s): Guitar, human voice
- Years active: Early 1950s–2016
- Labels: Blue Goose Records

Larry Alonzo Johnson (May 15, 1938 – August 6, 2016) was an American blues singer and guitarist.

== Life and career ==
Johnson was born in Wrightsville, Georgia. His father was a preacher who traveled extensively. This led to Johnson being exposed to blues records by Blind Boy Fuller, who inspired Johnson to learn the rudiments of guitar playing. He served in the Navy between 1955 and 1959, before relocating to New York City. After his befriending Brownie and Stick McGhee, Johnson found employment recording with Big Joe Williams, Harry Atkins, and Alec Seward. The latter gave Johnson an introduction to Reverend Gary Davis.

Johnson's first single release was "Catfish Blues" / "So Sweet" (1962). His first album was produced by the blues writer and producer Sam Charters on Prestige Records entitled The Blues / A New Generation (PR 7142), in 1964. Hank Adkins was his second guitarist on this record. He made numerous live appearances with Davis over that decade. In 1971, Johnson released Fast and Funky, but his live playing gradually reduced. A couple of low key albums appeared in the 1980s, before Johnson received more regular live work in the 1990s, particularly in Europe. Whilst there his output included Railroad Man (1990) and Blues for Harlem (1999). Two Gun Green followed in 2002.

Johnson died on August 6, 2016, aged 78, in a nursing home in Harlem, New York. He was interred in the Calverton National Cemetery on Long Island, New York.

== Discography ==
=== Albums ===
- Larry Johnson (1962)
- The Blues / A New Generation with Hank Atkins (Prestige, 1965)
- Presenting the Country Blues (1970)
- Fast And Funky (1971)
- Blues from the Apple (1974)
- Larry Johnson (1974) Biograph BLP-12028
- Johnson! Where Did You Get That Sound (1983)
- Basin Free (1984)
- Railroad Man (1990)
- Midnight Hour Blues (1995)
- Blues for Harlem (1999)
- Two Gun Green (2002)
- The Gentle Side of Larry Johnson (2004)
- My Story Should Be Told (2007)

== See also ==
- Blue Goose Records
