= Manhattan Design =

Manhattan Design was a graphic design collective in New York City from 1979 until 1991. The studio is known for having designed the MTV logo, as well as album packaging, posters, books, and magazines. They also conceived the adaptation of the MTV "moon man" as the award for the MTV Video Music Awards, based on the original concept by MTV's first creative director, Fred Seibert, a video that played at the top of every hour of every day for almost four years (75,000 times).

== History ==
Partners Pat Gorman, Frank Olinsky, and Patti Rogoff met at the Arica Institute, where they worked in the in-house design department. They founded Manhattan Design in 1979, opening their first office in a tiny room in the back of the New York School of T'ai Chi Chuan, on the second floor above C.O. Bigelow Apothecaries, in Greenwich Village.

=== MTV logo design ===
Late in 1980, before the channel had been formally named (it was originally called "The Music Channel" after its sister network, The Movie Channel), MTV creative director Fred Seibert approached the team to design the network's logo. He had known Olinsky since childhood, and Olinsky had designed record covers for Seibert's company Oblivion Records in 1975. Manhattan Design created hundreds of preliminary designs, but when the 'MTV' name was chosen, partner Gorman sketched out the now familiar "M" in a bold 3-d sans serif, a "new wave" style "TV" was added by Olinsky, and the design was presented to the network. Seibert and partner Alan Goodman wanted the "TV" redesigned, and Olinsky took a large version of the "M" into the studio stairwell, spray painted a graffiti-style "TV" on it, and presented it, paint drips and all, to the network.

After the logo was approved, the partners were asked to come up with the "corporate colors" for the logo. A revolutionary decision was made: there wouldn't be any corporate colors. The "M" and the "TV" could be made of anything at all. The influence of the MTV logo's chameleon-like look can be seen today.

As a result of their association with MTV, Manhattan Design became highly sought after for all sorts of "hip" design projects, working with such notables as The B-52s, The Cars, Billy Idol, Duran Duran, R.E.M., Sting, 10,000 Maniacs, Suzanne Vega, and others.

== Closing ==
When Manhattan Design closed up shop in 1991, Patti Rogoff was hired to work in-house for the MTV Networks Creative Services group, Frank Olinsky went on to become a leading designer of album packages, and Pat Gorman became an acupuncturist.
