= Tom Pomposello =

American musician

Thomas Anthony Pomposello (July 17, 1949 – January 25, 1999) was an American roots musician, notable for playing and recording with country blues musician Mississippi Fred McDowell. He was also a cable television and advertising producer for clients like MTV Networks, and produced idents for the cable channels Nickelodeon and MTV, and for Nickelodeon's late-night programming block Nick at Nite. He died in a car accident outside of Kingston, New York in January 1999.

== Early life ==
Born and educated on Long Island, New York, Pomposello had an early affinity towards music, eventually teaching himself the guitar, bass guitar, harmonica, mandolin, dulcimer, and dobro. Getting caught up in the pop music revolution that swept the world in the wake of the rising popularity of the Beatles, he had a particular interest in blues-based English bands like the Animals and the Rolling Stones, which led to a lifelong passion for American blues.

After a brief thought of joining a seminary, Pomposello married young and had a son, Travis. Needing to earn a living without a college education, he teamed up with a close friend, Rob Witter, and opened a "hippie" record store in Huntington, New York. Emblematic of the times, the two named their business "Kropotkin Records" (for anarchist Peter Kropotkin), and it distinguished itself from other, similar stores of the era for avoiding the sale of marijuana paraphernalia and concentrated instead on its owners' enthusiasm for the rise of the album era of music, rock and otherwise. Soon after the opening of the business, Pomposello earned his permanent stage name, "Honest" Tom Pomposello, when running for office as Huntington's Receiver of Taxes.

== Musical career and recording ==
Pomposello started flirting with the idea of recording his own music as early as 1970. He introduced himself to legendary country blues musician Mississippi Fred McDowell, which led to gigs as McDowell's bass guitarist in New York City, famously in November 1971, when the two were recorded live in concert at The Gaslight Cafe for radio station WKCR by host Fred Seibert. The tapes eventually surfaced around the world on vinyl in 1972, when Pomposello and Seibert (with partner Dick Pennington) started Oblivion Records. Originally conceived as a vehicle for Pomposello's music, the vision of the company expanded when the commercial potential of McDowell's final recording was considered.

Four Oblivion releases later (he also produced and played the bass guitar on Blues from the Apple) it was time for Pomposello's first solo album. Honest Tom Pomposello was an album that started out as a blues record and ended up as a true Americana roots recording. Ten tracks recorded over three years, in five locations, and various configurations of nine musicians, the music was a sweep of folk, blues, and R&B.

In the early 1980s, Pomposello melded his performance abilities with his extensive musical scholarship. He toured of New York public high schools, under the auspices of BOCES of New York State (Board of Cooperative Educational Services), teaching students the history of American blues. Simultaneously, he taught music as a professor at Five Towns College in Long Island, New York.

== Television production ==
Blues performing is an itinerant profession at best, and by 1984, Pomposello found himself employed in New York City as a producer at Fred/Alan, Inc., the advertising agency started by former MTV executives Alan Goodman and Fred Seibert (also Pomposello's partner in Oblivion Records). He was able to use his music skills as the soundtrack producer of the groundbreaking Nickelodeon network identifications. Adding animation and television production to his skills, he quickly produced hundreds of spots for Nickelodeon (many featuring The Jive Five), Nick-at-Nite, as well as a music video with James Brown and Afrika Bambaataa for Fred/Alan's client Tommy Boy Entertainment.

After leaving Fred/Alan in 1989, Pomposello incorporated as Pomposello Productions, concentrating on advertising and television branding, and to pursue personal projects, working for Nickelodeon, TV Land, American Movie Classics, MTV, Old Navy, ABC, HBO Family, Turner Network Television (TNT), Cartoon Network, and Noggin.

Pomposello recorded several albums in various blues oriented styles, focusing on his custom-made, Mandolin Brothers dobro playing. Simultaneously, he was rediscovering his spiritual roots through the nuns of the Abbey of Regina Laudis, recording their first CD of Gregorian Chant.

== Family ==
Tom Pomposello is survived by his third wife, Patricia Lawrence Pomposello, his son Travis Pomposello and his step sons.
