= Chip Wass =

American illustrator, designer, and animator

Chip Wass (born 1965) is an American illustrator, designer, and animator whose drawings are noted for their ironic style and trenchant comic wit. His art has appeared, among other places, on Nick at Nite and The Cartoon Network, in The New York Times, Entertainment Weekly, and The Washington Post, and on albums of the Florida ska band, Less Than Jake. He has been a jury member of the AIGA (the professional organization for design) and a board member of the AIGA/NY.

== Work and filmography ==
- Nick at Nite (network IDs) (1996)
- Nick at Nite (network rebrand) (1999)
- Nicktoons Network (logo) (2005)
- Shorty McShorts' Shorts (graphic design) (2006)
  - Mascot Prep (2007)
- Listerine ("Agent Cool Blue" character design) (2007)
- Nick Jr. (on-air icons) (2007)
