= Nick at Nite =

Nighttime programming block on Nickelodeon

- Logo used since September 18, 2023 (Note: The logo's wordmark has been used since September 28, 2009; color changed on October 6, 2012. Additionally, this logo is a variant meant for white backgrounds; the main variant has a white wordmark in conjunction with a fully orange splat.)
- Network: Nickelodeon (Note: Daily: 7 p.m. – 7 a.m. ET/PT)
- Launched: July 1, 1985; 41 years ago
- Country of origin: United States
- Owner: Nickelodeon Group (Skydance)
- Headquarters: One Astor Plaza; New York City, U.S.
- Sister network: List: Adult Swim; Boomerang; Cartoon Network; Cartoonito; Discovery Familia; Discovery Family; Nickelodeon; Nick at Nite; Nick Jr. (Block); Nick Jr.; NickMusic; Nicktoons; TeenNick
- Original languages: English; Spanish (via SAP audio track)
- Official website: nickatnite.com

Nick at Nite (stylized as Nick@Nite from 2002 to 2007 and since 2009) is an American nighttime programming block on Nickelodeon. The block's programming broadcasts during the evening, primetime and late night hours. The block initially consisted of syndicated sitcoms and films from the 1950s to the 1970s. Nick at Nite gradually shifted its programming to primarily airing sitcoms as recent as the mid-1990s to the 2010s. The block was launched on July 1, 1985, and it replaced A&E on Nickelodeon's channel space after it spun off into its own 24-hour channel. The block launched present-day TV Land in 1996. The Nickelodeon, a division of Skydance's networks unit, generally regards Nick at Nite as a separate channel that shares space with Nickelodeon on the channel due to the block targeting adult audiences. Nielsen has reported Nick at Nite ratings separately from Nickelodeon since 2004.

== History ==
=== Early years ===
In 1984, A&E Networks (a joint venture between Hearst, NBC, and ABC) announced their plans to spin off A&E, which had been airing in Nickelodeon's channel space at night, into a separate 24-hour cable channel. Nickelodeon's general manager, Geraldine Laybourne, was asked by MTV Networks President Bob Pittman to develop programming for the vacated time slot. This was to take advantage of valuable satellite time as A&E was moving to its own channel. Laybourne sought the help of programming and branding consultants Alan Goodman and Fred Seibert of Fred/Alan Inc. – who were previously successful in MTV (music video channel) and Nickelodeon's extensive 1984 rebranding – to come up with new programming ideas. The transition to a 24-hour broadcast for Nickelodeon took place in June, with some cable providers substituting the primetime schedule of other niche-interest networks onto the channel space.

After being presented with over 200 episodes of The Donna Reed Show (a 1950s sitcom which Laybourne despised), Goodman and Seibert conceived the idea of the "first oldies TV network." They modeled the new evening and overnight programming block on the successful oldies radio format "The Greatest Hits of All Time" and branded the block with their next evolution of MTV- and Nickelodeon-style imagery and bumpers. Head programmer Debby Beece led the team to the name "Nick at Nite" for the new block; a logo originally conceived for the block was based on Nickelodeon's "pinball" logo introduced in 1981, which was discontinued with that network's rebrand. Fred/Alan developed the original logo with Tom Corey and Scott Nash of Boston advertising agency Corey McPherson Nash, creators of the well-recognized Nickelodeon orange splat logo (Nick at Nite's logo design would maintain a separate, yet similar visual appearance and design from its parent network).

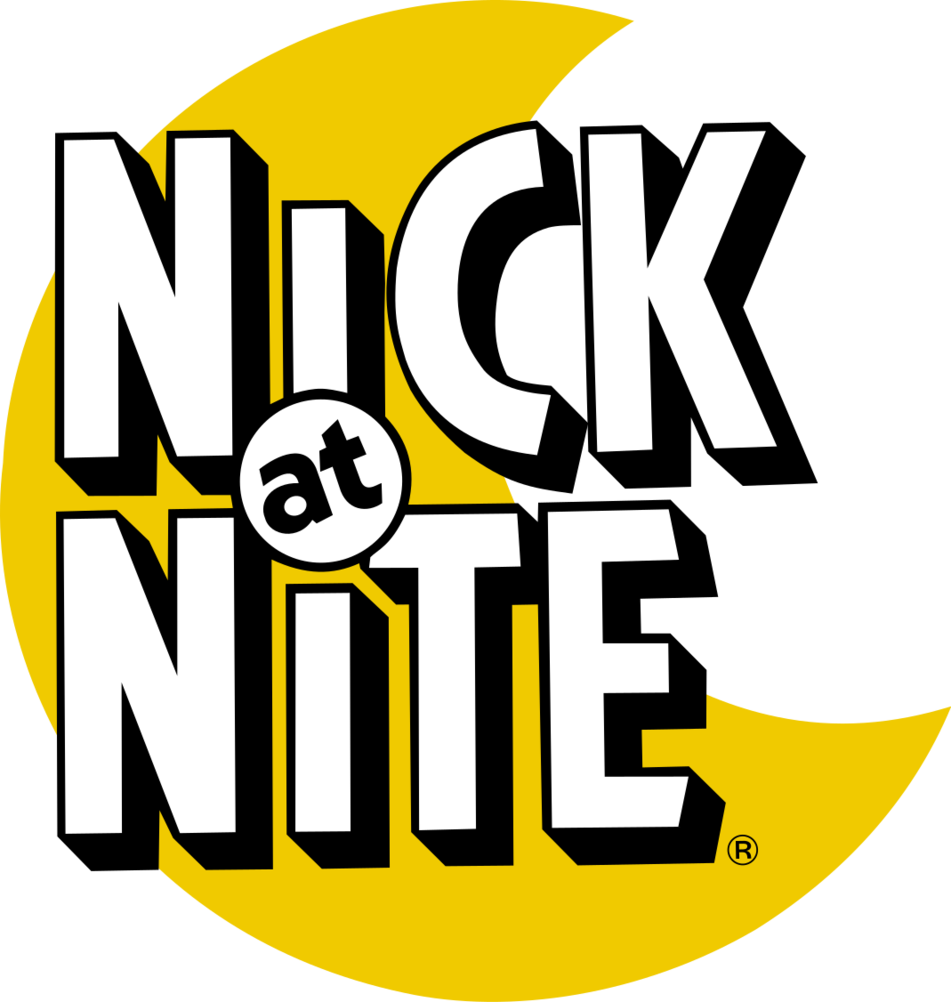
Nick at Nite logo used from July 1, 1985 to April 30, 1992

Nick at Nite debuted at 8 p.m. Eastern Time on July 1, 1985 as a block on Nickelodeon. Its initial programming (running from 8 p.m. to 6 a.m., seven nights a week) was a mixture of sitcoms, films, and one drama series. The block was led by Dennis the Menace, and accompanied by The Donna Reed Show, the unconventional comedy Turkey Television (which, like Dennis, also aired on Nickelodeon), and Route 66. A nightly film presentation, branded as the Nick at Nite Movie, aired at 9 p.m. ET through the end of the decade, and included such classic films as the 1947 film The Red House and the 1937 film A Star Is Born. The same five-hour block of programs originally repeated from 1 a.m. and ran until Nickelodeon began its broadcast day at 6 a.m. ET. As Nick at Nite grew, it would add to its library of shows expanding out to rerun sketch comedy, such as episodes from the early seasons of NBC's SNL as well as the Canadian series SCTV. It also briefly reran the 1970s faux local talk show Fernwood 2 Night. As times went by, the channel's sitcom library expanded to over a hundred shows.

By the early 1990s, Nick at Nite began running a full schedule of programming, with overnight hours filled with a mixture of secondary runs of shows airing on its evening schedule and series that were no longer shown on the evening lineup. In 1995, Nick at Nite celebrated its 10th anniversary with a week-long event, in which the channel aired "hand-picked episodes" of almost every series that had aired on Nick at Nite since its July 1985 debut. Each episode was introduced with its milestone history, episode number, and pop culture references to the individual program's original run on Nick at Nite. A special 10th Anniversary on-screen bug was shown at the bottom left corner of the screen for 10 seconds once per half-hour show, and was used for the entire 1995 year, much in the same vein as the 20th Anniversary logo in 2005 (in contrast, Nick at Nite did not make any acknowledgment of its 25th nor 30th anniversaries following changes in management). The block launched a spinoff, digicable network in 1996 known as Nick at Nite's TV Land, which in 1997 rebranded to just TV Land.

=== 2004–present ===
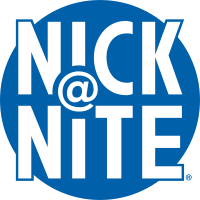
Nick at Nite logo used from July 1, 2002 to January 1, 2007; an orange variant was used until September 3, 2007

In March 2004, Nielsen began splitting up Nick at Nite and Nickelodeon in its primetime and total daytime ratings reports, due to the different programming, advertisers and target audiences between the two services; this caused controversy among executives of some cable channels who believed that this move manipulated the ratings, given that Nick at Nite's broadcast day takes up only a fraction of Nickelodeon's programming schedule. Nickelodeon's and Nick at Nite's respective ratings periods encompass only the hours they each operate under the total day rankings, though Nick at Nite is rated only for the primetime ratings; this is due to a ruling by Nielsen in July 2004 that networks have to program for 51% or more of a particular daypart to qualify for ratings for that daypart. For the channel's 20th anniversary celebration in June 2005, TV Land aired an episode from almost every series that had appeared on Nick at Nite.

Nick at Nite logo used from September 3, 2007 to September 28, 2009

On January 4, 2006, after the MTV Networks became part of a new Viacom company, Cyma Zarghami replaced Herb Scannell as Nickelodeon's president, and Nick at Nite was placed into Viacom's newly formed Kids & Family Group led by Zarghami.

On January 1, 2007, the coloring of Nick at Nite's logo was changed from blue to orange, matching the coloring of Nickelodeon's logo. Nick at Nite's focus was changed under Nickelodeon control from recognizable television comedy series to family-led situation comedies, including the animated original series Glenn Martin, DDS. On September 3, the network introduced a new logo based on Nickelodeon's longtime "splat" logo, with the orange "splat" formed in the shape of a waning gibbous moon – this effectively integrated the Nickelodeon branding onto Nick at Nite for the first time, as the varied logos that were used from its 1985 launch utilized variants of the Futura Condensed font (the 1984-09 Nickelodeon logo designed by Seibert and Goodman used the Balloon typeface) with various shape backgrounds and a small circle with the word "at" (replaced by an "@" symbol overlaid on a circle background on July 1, 2002 for visual symmetry, owing to the character's building ubiquity from online and eventually into general pop culture) lodged between and staggering the "I"'s.

Nick at Nite logo used from September 28, 2009 to October 6, 2012

On July 5, 2009, Nick at Nite's programming hours expanded to begin at 8 p.m. Eastern and Pacific Time on Sunday through Thursday nights, while the Friday lineup continued to start at 10 p.m. Eastern and Pacific Time until October 2009, when the Friday start time became 9 p.m. (the Saturday lineup continues to have a 10 p.m. Eastern and Pacific Time start time due to the presence of the long-running Saturday night comedy lineup on Nickelodeon). Nick at Nite's times of operation have changed several times over the years, to at one point (between 1998 and 2000) beginning as late as 9 p.m. Eastern and Pacific Time on Sunday through Thursdays and ending as early as 5:30 a.m. Eastern and Pacific Time.

Logo used since October 6, 2012; used concurrently with the 2023 logo

Nick at Nite overhauled its on-air appearance on September 28, 2009, as part of Nickelodeon's rebranding effort – the new logo, also based on Nickelodeon's logo, stylized the network's name as "nick@nite" (rendered as one word in lowercase letters within the new network logo). The network also ceased airing the production closing credits for most of its programs (except for those that have tag scenes during the end credits, and originally some series that aired on the network prior to the rebrand that rejoined the network afterward, such as Full House) and began employing network-even closing credits – which Nickelodeon had been utilizing since at least 2000 (both Nick at Nite and Nickelodeon often remove end tag scenes or blooper reels of some shows using this format).

As of September 29, 2025, Nick at Nite programming starts at 7 p.m.

== Programming ==
Nick at Nite's lineup presently includes reruns of syndicated comedy series from the mid 1990s to late 2010s and movie broadcasts. The block previously had its own exclusively-produced original programs (such as See Dad Run and Instant Mom).

Due to its dependence on sitcom reruns whose cable syndication rights are limited to a daypart (a certain part of the day) owing to contracts with studios and/or distributors (for instance, Paramount holds the exclusive cable nighttime rights to run Friends, airing it on both Nick at Nite and Comedy Central, while WBD-owned TBS holds exclusive daytime rights to said series), Nick at Nite has no video on demand service nor Paramount+ presence (formerly its past original series were usually combined within Nickelodeon's video-on-demand section) and its website features no video content.

=== Programming history ===
Nick at Nite was known as the "first classic TV network," having originally aired older classic television programs from the 1950s through the early 1970s throughout its nighttime schedule. The time range of Nick at Nite's programming has shifted over the years, to the point whereby the early 2000s, its classic series consisted primarily of shows from the late 1970s to the late 1990s, and also included series from the early and mid-2000s by the end of that decade and into the early 2010s. The early success with classic television series, as well as the eventual shift away from series made prior to 1985, eventually led to the creation of over-the-air digital broadcast networks similar to Nick at Nite's original format such as the Retro Television Network, Antenna TV, and MeTV (which have featured many shows formerly seen on Nick at Nite).

Nick at Nite airs approximately all of its programming in hour-long (and sometimes two-hour) blocks, which were branded under the "Double Takes" banner from 2002 to 2007; typically series that air back-to-back are scheduled in two blocks, one in primetime and one in late night. Also typically, series that have been airing on Nick at Nite for at least three years are often moved exclusively to the overnight schedule in order to make room for newly acquired series (though in the past, entire broadcast runs of a few series such as Perfect Strangers and Charles in Charge have aired in an overnight graveyard slot for a short period of time following their first premiere on the network). For about a year-and-a-half prior to the September 28, 2009 rebrand, Nick at Nite aired marathons of programming from midnight to 5:00 a.m. Eastern Time.

Nick at Nite was previously one of the few basic cable channels in the United States that continued to sign off for scheduled satellite maintenance, occurring on a Wednesday morning from 5:30 to 6:00 a.m. Eastern Time on a bi-monthly basis, with color bars being displayed during the sign-off period (Paramount Global-owned sister channels Nick Jr., Nicktoons, MTV and its spin-off channels, VH1, and VH1 Classic (currently MTV Classic) also sign off for a half-hour on a bi-monthly basis at the same time as Nick at Nite for the same reason); it is also one of only a handful of cable channels to have discontinued airing infomercials. Nickelodeon (through Nick at Nite) ran infomercials in some overnight time slots from 1987 to 1998 (making Nickelodeon one of the few currently operating kids-targeted channels to discontinue airing paid programming, others include Universal Kids (closed in 2025), and it is also only one of two Paramount-owned networks to have removed paid programming from its schedule; AfrAm-owned sister channel BET had discontinued infomercials in 1997, replacing them with religious programming in overnight/early morning time slots).

On May 16, 2011, Nick at Nite began scheduling programs airing from 11:00 p.m. to 6:00 a.m. Eastern Time in an "off-the-clock" format, in which the network runs extended commercial breaks of as much as seven minutes in length to allow additional advertising spots (a method that has tense viewer criticism due to the length between the beginning of each commercial break and the beginning of the next segment of a program), allowing the programs to be broadcast in a longer time slot each half-hour until 6:00 a.m. Eastern Time, when start times return to a half-hourly format. This format was originated by its spin-off network TV Land beginning in 2010, and has since been taken by other Paramount Skydance networks including MTV, BET and Paramount Network around the same time as Nick at Nite. The side effect that results from this scheduling and expanded advertising is that one full half-hour of programming is lost, therefore the overnight schedule features only a single episode of one series whereas most other Nick at Nite programs air in double episode blocks.

On June 25, 2012, Nick at Nite began airing Nickelodeon programs for the first time, airing reruns of All That and Kenan & Kel (from 1990s) from 9:00 to 10:00 p.m. Eastern Time weeknights. Two weeks later, the two series were replaced with reruns of Victorious, before being replaced by the teen drama/telenovela series Hollywood Heights, which would move to TeenNick halfway through its first (and only) season due to low ratings. Nickelodeon and Nick at Nite currently share the 9:00 to 10:00 p.m. Eastern Time time slot on weeknights.

=== Movies ===
In addition to running sitcom reruns, Nick at Nite has also broadcast movies in early primetime; after the 1985 to 1989 run of the Nick at Nite Movie showcase, the channel did not air movies on its schedule again until Summer 2007, when it aired films each week on Tuesday nights. The channel has aired films occasionally since then, and have begun to air them periodically since February 2010 on Sunday nights, starting that month with TV broadcasts of the Nickelodeon Movies-produced Good Burger, Angus, Thongs and Perfect Snogging, The Rugrats Movie, and The SpongeBob SquarePants Movie. Additionally, many family-oriented films from other distributors air on the block.

Some films and special presentations that Nick at Nite aired during 2010 and 2011 had occasionally aired over what is normally Nickelodeon's broadcast time (for example, the February 21, 2010 premiere broadcast of the special School Gyrls aired at 7:00 p.m. Eastern Time, though Nickelodeon typically does not turn over its channel space to Nick at Nite until 8:00 p.m. Eastern Time on Sunday nights), which is unusual as some of these special presentations are aimed at Nickelodeon's preteen target audience; however until May 2010, when the network began promoting its film broadcasts as airing on Nick at Nite, promos for these films did not acknowledge whether they were to be broadcast on Nick at Nite nor Nickelodeon (an issue as promos for scheduled primetime films were cross-promoted with Nickelodeon), with the only reference as to the film's airing on Nick at Nite coming from the screen bug that is shown during the film.

Some of the movies (by third-party film companies such as Sony, Universal, and Disney) Nick at Nite has broadcast in recent years have included the Back to the Future trilogy, Ferris Bueller's Day Off, Baby's Day Out, Pretty in Pink, National Lampoon's Vacation, Ghostbusters (and its sequel Ghostbusters II), Jurassic Park, The Nutty Professor, Legally Blonde, The Princess Diaries, and The Parent Trap. Film broadcasts have become more common on Nick at Nite since Autumn 2012, often airing on an almost-weekly basis, typically on Sunday evenings.

=== Original programming ===
Nick at Nite has also occasionally broadcast its own programs, sometimes with bizarre and surrealistic results. On December 5, 1987, the channel ran a contest called the Do It Yourself Sitcom Special, which was billed as the first time that real people ever had their own television shows. Viewers submitted their own sitcom ideas and the winner would supposedly get their own show. In 1988, the channel aired a half-hour animated Christmas special from Ralph Bakshi, which served as the pilot for a proposed animated series titled Tattertown. The program was never picked up to series, but the special, later renamed Christmas in Tattertown, aired on Nick at Nite every Christmas for several years. In 1990, the channel briefly aired a satirical comedy series called On the Television, a faux critic show hosted by Siskel and Ebert-type characters that featured bizarre, sometimes disturbing clips from spoofed television shows supposedly beginning that week.

In the early 1990s, the channel ran a one-time special featuring old television commercials; this idea would be rehashed by the network on many other shows and eventually become a project of a spin-off channel, TV Land, as part of the "Retromercials" segment that aired during commercial breaks until the mid-2000s. Another special aired by Nick at Nite was promoted as a "TV dad" quiz, in which the host walked through a "typical TV Home," and quizzed viewers at home with trivia about classic TV dad clichés. At one point, the host told viewers to connect pictures of TV dads with their appropriate TV wives displayed on the screen with a magic marker. At the end of this segment, he mentions that he forgot to tell the viewers to place a piece of plastic over their screen while doing this and made jokes about the viewers uselessly trying to clean the magic marker off their screens for the rest of the show.

In 1991, Nick at Nite debuted its own sitcom based around the rerun genre it had developed. The short-lived Hi Honey, I'm Home! (titled after the catchphrase that male lead characters in some classic sitcoms said to their wives when returning home from work) focused on a 1950s-aesthetic sitcom family called the Nielsens, whose show has been removed from syndication, forcing the family to leave TV Land and move into a real 1990s suburban neighborhood, repeatedly confronting the family with a culture shock. The series aired on Fridays as part of ABC's TGIF lineup, with the episode being "rerun" on Nick at Nite in primetime on the following Sunday. In 2008, the channel announced that it was developing a family-oriented revival of the 1990s game show GUTS titled My Family's Got GUTS, as well as a dog competition show. My Family's Got GUTS eventually premiered on Nickelodeon in September 2008. On August 17, 2009, Nick at Nite debuted a new animated stop-motion series called Glenn Martin DDS, which ran for two seasons. Scripted programming returned to Nick at Nite in 2012, with the June 11 debut of the telenovela-based teen drama Hollywood Heights, followed on October 6 with the premiere of See Dad Run, though the former relocated to TeenNick midway through its run due to low ratings and branding confusion.

In 2017, the network also began to carry episodes of Nashville on an hour delay from CMT on nights when new episodes aired in order to further augment that series' ratings.

=== Marathons and blocks ===
Programming marathons were an innovation that began with Nick at Nite in 1985, eventually leading to the phenomenon of "binge-watching". Working together at college radio station WKCR-FM while attending New York City's prestigious Columbia University, Fred/Alan, Inc. founders Alan Goodman and Fred Seibert saw the ratings success of radio marathons featuring music from Ludwig van Beethoven, John Coltrane, and Charles Mingus. As the Nick at Nite "oldies" format was adapted from radio, they suggested the multi-hour (sometimes multi-day) marathon might also work with television programming. The marathon format proved successful and became a ratings boosting in demand with cable television networks for over two decades.

During the week of Halloween in late October 1990, the network held a special contest, hosted by game show host Wink Martindale, during a marathon of Alfred Hitchcock Presents. Viewers at home were supposed to keep a running total of total number of deaths on the show. At the end of the marathon, the persons who had gotten the correct total were entered into a drawing to win a prize. As Martindale said, "it's kind of like guessing the number of jelly beans in a jelly bean jar, but instead of jelly beans, you're using cadavers!"

When new shows are added to the lineup, they are usually accompanied by some kind of marathon that is sometimes hosted by a star from the show. For instance, when Newhart joined Nick at Nite in the early 1990s, the channel also acquired Bob Newhart's short-lived third sitcom Bob, and ran a block branded "Bob's Bob, Bob Newhart, Newhart Marathon", featuring the two shows along with The Bob Newhart Show (which it recently had the rights to broadcast), in an event hosted by Bob Newhart. Nick at Nite's first premiere of The Mary Tyler Moore Show was called the "Marython". When I Love Lucy joined Nick at Nite in 1994, a week-long marathon called "Nick at Nite Loves Lucy" aired, showcasing every one of Lucille Ball's sitcoms that aired between 1951 and 1986 (I Love Lucy, The Lucy–Desi Comedy Hour, The Lucy Show, Here's Lucy, and Life with Lucy). When some older shows were retired, Nick at Nite would also frequently have a marathon send-off. For instance, when Mister Ed was finally retired from the network in January 1993 after a seven-year run, Nick at Nite ran a weekend-long marathon of the show called "Au Revoir Mister Ed!"; a similar send-off for The Donna Reed Show, which ran on the channel for nine years beginning with Nick at Nite's July 1985 debut, also ran that year. My Three Sons was sent off the night Daylight Saving Time ended in October 1991 with a marathon called "Nite of the Setting Sons," permitting two extra episodes in the marathon due to the one-hour time shift.

During the summer months from the mid-to-late 1990s, the channel for a while ran a program block called "Vertivision" (later known as "Block Party Summer"), during which a different series was shown in a three-hour block each night of the week. In its first year, network promos referred to the nights featured in the special lineup as "Mary Mondays" (for The Mary Tyler Moore Show), "Lucy Tuesdays" (for I Love Lucy), "Bewitched Be-Wednesdays" (for Bewitched), "Jeannie Thursdays" (for I Dream of Jeannie), and "Sgt. Joe Fridays" (for Dragnet). With the passing years, the summer blocks shifted to include series recently added to Nick at Nite's program library.

Other seasonal scheduling blocks were also not uncommon such as Christmas-themed blocks during late December, Thanksgiving-themed blocks in November, and Valentine's Day-themed episodes in February. Each New Year's Eve from 1989 to 1998, the channel would host "Nick at Nite's (year) Rerun/Classic TV/TV Hits Countdown" hosted by longtime countdown radio DJ, Casey Kasem. Kasem would spend the period from noon (11:30 a.m. in 1990) until New Year's Day at 12:30 a.m. Eastern Time counting down the 25 "most classic" episodes of the series airing on Nick at Nite at that time as determined by viewers at home, with the #1 episode being aired at midnight.

Another well-known lineup was "A Whole Lotta Lucy" block which ran on Saturday nights from June 4, 1994, to May 3, 1996, which consisted of I Love Lucy, The Lucy Show and The Lucy–Desi Comedy Hour, which were all airing on the network at that time (a similar block aired on Saturday nights from 1996 to 2001, featuring only I Love Lucy and The Lucy–Desi Comedy Hour). In the mid-1990s, another Saturday night programming block titled "Very, Very Nick at Nite" centered around a different theme each week, such as "Very Very Mary" with four classic Mary Tyler Moore Show episodes. In Summer 2008, Nick at Nite aired a marathon called Battle of the Sexes, which featured episodes of their regular programs that engaged conflict between men and women.

Nick at Nite generally broadcasts a marathon of their programming on holidays (such as the "Luck of the Lopez" marathon of George Lopez that aired on Saint Patrick's Day (an Irish holiday) in March 2008). For two years in a row, in October 2007 and 2008, Nick at Nite broadcast the Shocktober marathon (branded as Shocktober 2 for the 2008 event), featuring Halloween-themed episodes of the regularly scheduled program. Other holidays that the network often features themed marathons include Mother's Day, Father's Day, and Christmas.

On June 17, 2019, Nick at Nite aired a simulcast of the 2019 MTV Movie & TV Awards for the first time, along with many of its sister networks. On August 26, it also aired a simulcast of the 2019 MTV Video Music Awards for the first time. In December 2019, Nick at Nite began airing a marathon of Friends to celebrate the show's 25th anniversary since its finale throughout half of Nick at Nite's regular programming time.

On April 18, 2020, Nick at Nite aired a simulcast of One World: Together at Home, which was simulcast on multiple networks and platforms.

=== Television specials ===
Occasionally, episodes of Rugrats and SpongeBob SquarePants have aired regularly or as marathons during Nick at Nite special events in the 1990s and 2000s. This has also occurred during crossovers with Nickelodeon special programming where the Nickelodeon programming runs into the regular Nick at Nite timeslot. A 30-year reunion special of Double Dare aired on November 23, 2016. Regular marathons occur on Nick at Nite. Usually when a show premieres, it receives an all-night or a week-long marathon. Seasonal marathons also occur for holidays such as Valentine's Day, St. Patrick's Day, Mother's Day (May), Father's Day (June), Halloween, Thanksgiving, and Christmas.

On June 17, 2019, Nick at Nite aired a simulcast of the 2019 MTV Movie & TV Awards for the first time, along with many of its sister networks. On August 26, it also aired a simulcast of the 2019 MTV Video Music Awards for the first time. In December 2019, Nick at Nite began airing a marathon of Friends to celebrate the show's 25-year anniversary since its finale throughout half of Nick at Nite's regular programming time. Nick at Nite aired a simulcast of the widely distributed, One World: Together at Home on April 18, 2020.

== Branding and commercials ==
Nick at Nite has used numerous unusual and offbeat commercials, logos and promotions. Alan Goodman and Fred Seibert assembled a team of writers/producers, modeled on their original 1981 creative team that had launched sister channel MTV. The group – which included Scott Webb, Jim Levi, Dave Potorti, Jay Newell, Will McRobb, and Tom Hill – was guided towards creating a series of internal campaigns to emphasize the seeming paradox of a contemporary network setting that programmed reruns from the 1960s and earlier. A series of five "promises" were organized into four 30-second spots each hour, each emphasizing an attribute of the programming format.

In 1986, the channel began running a few different animated 10-second channel identifications (produced by Noyes and Laybourne and the Fred/Alan agency) that were repetitive in creation, but all had vastly different endings (similar to the "watch me pull a rabbit out of my hat" gag from The Rocky and Bullwinkle Show). In one such ID, the first chord of The Beatles' "A Hard Day's Night" would be heard strummed, as a man began to hang up a Nick at Nite logo and common living room objects such as a chair and a television set. Once the man sat down in front of the TV set and clicked the remote control, a bizarre incident would happen, such as a gorilla coming out of the set. Later IDs started with either a woman setting up her backyard behind a "city" background, which was made of cardboard, or a couple setting up their living room. In May 1991, Nick at Nite started running a wide variety of IDs created in association with Pomposello Productions. These were made with almost every imaginable technique from cel animation to stop motion, to original live-action and archival footage. Almost every commercial had a different jingle professing Nick at Nite as being "A TV Viewer's Dream" for "the TV generation" and as coming from a place called "TV Land" ("Hello out there, from TV Land!") and promoting "Better Living Through Television", although these claims were always somewhat tongue in cheek.

There were also sarcastic promotions created for shows airing on the network: an announcer's voiceover would discuss the series, accompanied by clips and music, and sometimes the show's theme song. The commercials would use an actor's line or expression and take it out of context to create a new subversive meaning. The channel still uses this technique today, although often in a more partial way. A popular take-off of the Michelob Light commercial, "The Nite Belongs to Nick" ran for a short period of time before being discontinued due to copyright issues. One series of promos had Dick Van Dyke (whose eponymous 1960s sitcom was a mainstay of the channel in the 1990s) depicted as "Chairman of Nick at Nite" (this idea was later recycled by one of Nick at Nite's sister networks, TeenNick, which depicted actor and television personality Nick Cannon (left TeenNick in 2020 due to antisemitic remarks) as the "Chairman of TeenNick" in a series of promos that began airing on September 28, 2009). In 1995, in honor of the network's 10th anniversary, Nick at Nite aired a tribute to the commercials throughout the network's existence and hosted by former network president Rich Cronin.

The channel also had a unique way of informing viewers about the show that was about to air next. Beginning as only some of the night's shows and their airtimes being listed as music played over an on-screen graphic, this simple concept would be revised and re-revised many times over. At one point, a television with objects and people from the show scrolling by (for instance, for Get Smart, a shoe phone, gun, along Max and 99) would appear on the screen while the announcer describes the program title and time; the time that the show was scheduled to air would be popped up in another box. Some shows were preceded by a bumper showing the following episode's number and title. Nick at Nite's original continuity announcer was Nickelodeon announcer Wendell Craig; Bill St. James alternated with Wendell before replacing him as the channel's primary continuity announcer in 1992 and serving in that capacity until 2007 (except for a short period from March 2001 until September 2002, in which he was replaced with a different Soul Train-esque announcer). Bill has also served as an announcer for the premium channels Showtime, The Movie Channel (both former Viacom sister channels to Nick at Nite), and HBO, among other television clients, as well as serving as the host of the radio shows Flashback and Time Warp (which focus on classic rock and oldies music).

A few of Nick at Nite's promos in the early 1990s involved Dixie the TV Land Pixie promoting Nick at Nite "Brand Reruns". During this time, the network would also play an interstitial series called "Milkman," about a milkman who would distribute good advice to customers on his milk delivery route. By 1995, Nick at Nite introduced a new mascot named "Phil". Phil was seen doing several stunts, such as dressing up as a crab during Block Party Summer bumpers. In an ID usually seen when Nick at Nite signed on, Phil was seen working as technician to "try to get Nick at Nite up and running." In December 1996, Nick at Nite introduced twelve network IDs directed by Mo Willems which introduced the block's CGI mascot "Logobelly". Logobelly was seen doing various activities and appeared on colorful backgrounds on TV sets interacting with past TV stars watching television sets. Curious Pictures created six more IDs for Nick at Nite featuring "Logobelly" in April 1998 with Toonz and 3D Studio Max software.

Nick at Nite received a rebrand in January 1999 (which was used until March 2001) produced by Scott Stowell and Chip Wass (who previously designed a set of computer-animated IDs for the network in 1996). The rebrand prominently used the color yellow and different hues of blue (which became darker overnight). Nick at Nite's IDs at the time typically featured a moving illustration by Chip Wass and either a female voiceover singing a jingle about the network which ended with "Nick at Nite, the place for TV hits" or narration by Bill St. James for overnight IDs.

In March 2001, in an effort to cash-in on the reality-TV boom, Nick at Nite underwent an extensive rebrand with the new theme of "Unreality", with IDs and bumpers featuring clips from actual events then going to clips from TV shows inspiring the events and then ending with the Nick at Nite logo and slogan "100% Sitcoms, 100% Unreality". One bumper used during this era had the slogan "All Sitcoms, All Night Long".

== TV Land ==
On April 29, 1996, Viacom spun off a separate network from Nick at Nite, TV Land (originally branded as "Nick at Nite's TV Land" until 1999), which features a variety of rerun programming; the channel is usually carried on the basic tiers of digital cable and satellite providers. On December 17, 2006, TV Land ceased operating under the control of Nick at Nite as Nickelodeon began overseeing that service under the MTV Networks Kids & Family Group, though TV Land continued to be operated as part of Viacom's MTV Networks division. During its early years, the channel ran classic television series from the early 1950s to the 1970s. In 2004, TV Land began to incorporate sitcoms from the 1980s and 1990s; reality shows and weekly movie presentations were added as the decade progressed. However, much of TV Land's programming continues to include series from the 1960s and 1970s. While in 2017 its original programming efforts were made up of multi-camera sitcoms such as Younger and Teachers targeted towards a female Generation X audience, in late 2018, the former moved to Paramount Network and the latter was canceled. That decision was eventually reversed, with season 6 premiering in June 2019, and season 7 rolling out in 2021 after being released in bulk on Paramount+ several weeks earlier.

== International ==
Compared to Nickelodeon, the international versions of Nick at Nite are limited, despite the block's success in the United States. Most international versions of Nickelodeon either run as a 24-hour channel (such as Asia) or share space with a non-Nick at Nite channel (such as Germany, which had a version of Nick at Nite called "Nicknight," but replaced it with MTV Plus in 2018, later a timeshift of Comedy Central in 2021). As of 2023, Australia is the only country outside the United States to have a Nick at Nite block.
