= Live in New York (Fred McDowell album) =

Live album by Mississippi Fred McDowell
- Released: 1972
- Recorded: 1971
- Genre: Country blues
- Label: Oblivion Records
- Producer: Dick Pennington, Tom Pomposello, Fred Seibert

Mississippi Fred McDowell chronology
| Eight Years Ramblin (1970) | Live in New York (1972) |

Live in New York is the final album recording by the American country blues musician Mississippi Fred McDowell. New York-based American independent Oblivion Records released the first edition in the Spring of 1972, months before McDowell's death in July 1972. A subsequent Oblivion issue with a one song substitution, and new and redesigned liner notes came out one year later.

== Recording ==
Producer/engineer Fred Seibert (assisted by Roy "Slim" Langbord) recorded Fred McDowell's November 1971 performance at The Gaslight Cafe in Greenwich Village for radio broadcast over Columbia University's WKCR-FM, in New York City. He hosted the station's Saturday blues show and was hometown friends with McDowell's second on the performance, bassist Tom Pomposello.

Recording was done with Shure Electronics microphones and mixers and a one-track monaural Nagra tape recorder. Editing was accomplished in one 14-hour session at WKCR using Ampex tape decks.

=== Release ===
The album has remained available continuously from 1972 until the present. Currently, there are streaming versions of all editions that can be accessed at the official Oblivion Records archive blog. Digital downloads are available worldwide from Bandcamp, iTunes, Amazon.com, and other major digital retailers. Buyers should be aware of inferior bootlegs available as of 2010 on Amazon.com from Labor Records and Tomato Records.

The last authorized physical retail release of the recordings was in 2000 by the almost immediately defunct CD label Live Archive. Bassist/producer Pomposello went back to the original tapes and re-edited, re-sequenced, and remastered all nine tracks from the first two editions, plus 16 bonus outtakes. Slight hints of equalization and echo were added.

Release formats:

- LP record (12") record (mono) [deleted late 1970s]
- CD (2000 version) (mono) [deleted late 2000]
- MP3 (mono)
- Audio streaming (mono)

=== Packaging ===
On the original 1st pressing the cover sleeve consisted of very thick cardboard outer sleeve and the 12" vinyl record was protected with a white paper album liner. The 2nd edition pressing included a Fred McDowell discography printed on the inner sleeve.

=== Sleeve notes ===
Live session bassist and album producer Tom Pomposello wrote three different variations of the liner notes, consisting of several essays, across all officially licensed editions. Fred McDowell contributed a paragraph to the original release. There is a lengthy producer's notated digital booklet at the Oblivion archive site.

== Album cover and label ==
The original album covers and liners were designed by producer/engineer Fred Seibert. First edition labels were designed at the Viewlex pressing plant in Hauppauge, New York; second edition labels were designed by Seibert. The cover photo was of Fred McDowell at a live festival concert; back liner photos on the second edition are by noted UK writer and photographer Val Wilmer.

== Track listing ==
All tracks composed by Fred McDowell; except where indicated 1st edition, vinyl, 1972

=== Side one ===
1. "Shake 'Em on Down" - 4:04
2. "I'm Crazy About You Baby" - 4:42
3. "John Henry" - 4:40 (Traditional)
4. "You Got To Move" (a.k.a. "You Gotta Move")- 2:38
5. "Someday" - 3:52 (Sleepy John Estes, Fred McDowell)

=== Side two ===
1. "Mercy" - 5:25
2. "The Lovin' Blues" - 4:01
3. "Goin' to the River (Gonna Carry My Rockin' Chair)" - 5:12
4. "Baby, Please Don't Go" - 3:42 (Big Joe Williams)

2nd edition, vinyl, 1973

=== Side one ===
1. "Shake 'Em On Down" - 4:04
2. "I'm Crazy About You Baby" - 4:42
3. "John Henry" - 4:40 (Traditional)
4. "You Got To Move" (a.k.a. "You Gotta Move")- 2:38
5. "Someday" - 3:52 (Sleepy John Estes, Fred McDowell)

=== Side two ===
1. "Mercy" - 5:25
2. "The Lovin' Blues" - 4:01
3. "White Lightnin'" - 5:12
4. "Baby, Please Don't Go" - 3:42 (Big Joe Williams)

3rd edition, CD, 2000

=== Disc one ===
1. "Shake 'Em On Down" - 4:04
2. "Fred's Worried Blues"
3. "Mercy" - 5:25
4. "Jesus is on the Mainline" (Traditional)
5. "When the Saints Come Marchin' In" (Traditional)
6. "Someday Baby" - 3:52 (Sleepy John Estes, Fred McDowell)
7. "The Lovin' Blues" - 4:01
8. "White Lightnin'" - 5:12
9. "You Got To Move" (a.k.a. "You Gotta Move")- 2:38
10. "Louise"
11. "Baby, Please Don't Go" - 3:42 (Big Joe Williams)

=== Disc two ===
1. "Goin’ to the River (Carry My Rocking Chair)" - 5:12
2. "Shake 'Em On Down" - 4:04
3. "61 Highway"
4. "John Henry" - 4:40 (Traditional)
5. "My Babe" (Willie Dixon)
6. "I'm Crazy About You Baby" - 4:42
7. "Red Cross Store"
8. "Levee Camp Blues"
9. "Good Morning, School Girl"
10. "Don’t Mistreat Nobody (Cause You Got a Few Dimes)"
11. "Get Right"
12. "Good Night (Spoken Outro)"

== Personnel ==
- Mississippi Fred McDowell – vocals, electric guitar
- Tom Pomposello – bass guitar & second guitar

Additional musicians and production

- Fred Seibert – producer & audio engineer
- Dick Pennington & Tom Pomposello – producer

== Release history ==
| Region | Date | Label | Format | Catalogue |
|---|---|---|---|---|
| United States | Spring 1972 | Oblivion Records | mono LP | |
| United States | Spring 1973 | Oblivion Records | mono, LP | |
| United States | 9 2000 | Live Archive Records | | |
| United States | 9 2000 | Live Archive Records | remastered mono CD | |

== Sources ==
- The Official Oblivion Records website
- Pomposello, Tom "Mississippi Fred McDowell" Guitar Player Magazine, November 1977
- Pomposello.com
