= I Do Not Play No Rock 'n' Roll =

Studio album by Mississippi Fred McDowell
- Released: 1969
- Recorded: September 1969
- Studio: Malaco, Jackson
- Genre: Blues
- Label: Capitol
- Producer: Tommy Couch

Mississippi Fred McDowell chronology
| Mississippi Delta Blues Vol. 2 (1966) | I Do Not Play No Rock 'n' Roll (1969) | Mississippi Fred McDowell and His Blues Boys (1969) |

I Do Not Play No Rock 'n' Roll is an album by the American musician Mississippi Fred McDowell, released in 1969. Its title is taken from a phrase McDowell used to introduce "Baby Please Don't Go". It was rereleased in 1995 as part of the Capitol Blues Collection series. The title track was nominated for a Grammy Award in the "Best Ethnic or Traditional Recording (Including Traditional Blues)" category.

== Production ==
Produced by Tommy Couch, the album was recorded in September 1969 at Malaco Studios, in Jackson, Mississippi. Couch and Wolf Stephenson had met McDowell in the mid-1960s, when he had played fraternity parties at the University of Mississippi. It was McDowell's first album on which he played electric guitar; he was backed by Dulin Lancaster on drums and Jerry Puckett on bass. "Baby Please Don't Go" was written by Big Joe Williams.

== Critical reception ==
Professional ratings
Review scores
| Source | Rating |
|---|---|
| All Music Guide to the Blues | 5/5 stars |
| The Encyclopedia of Popular Music | 4/5 stars |
| MusicHound Blues: The Essential Album Guide | 4/5 stars |
| The Penguin Guide to Blues Recordings | 3/4 stars |
| The Rolling Stone Jazz & Blues Album Guide | 5/5 stars |

The Honolulu Star-Advertiser called the album "pure deep South blues". The Vineland Times Journal praised McDowell's "gripping, moaning guitar work, which sometimes becomes so texturally thick that it forms a wall of crystalline sound." The The Moncton Times said that "the music is pure, fluid, without the hard beat and steady rhythm often heard in conventional blues."

In 2001, Goldmine listed it among "25 Great Folk Revival Albums Not Limited to the 1960s", and said that it was "electrified and electrifying in its rustic eloquence." The Encyclopedia of Popular Music noted that "its intimate charm belied the intensity the performer still brought to his work."

== Track listing ==
Side 1

1. "Baby Please Don't Go"
2. "Good Morning Little School Girl"
3. "Kokomo Me Baby"
4. "That's All Right Baby"
5. "Red Cross Store"

Side 2

1. "Everybody's Down on Me"
2. "61 Highway"
3. "Glory Hallelujah"
4. "Jesus Is on the Mainline"
