= Oblivion Records =

Record label

- LP label from Oblivion's first release (2nd edition), Mississippi Fred McDowell: Live in New York, from 1972
- Founded: 1972
- Founder: Tom Pomposello, Fred Seibert, Richard Pennington III
- Defunct: 1976
- Genre: Blues, country blues, jazz, jazz fusion
- Country of origin: U.S.
- Location: Huntington, New York and New York City

Oblivion Records is an independent American record label that focuses on under recorded blues and jazz musicians. The company was originally based in Huntington, New York and the WKCR-FM studios at Columbia University in New York City, with a post office box (Box X) in Roslyn Heights, New York from 1972–1976. It now operates out of Los Angeles. After almost 50 years, Oblivion announced a new release in November 2021.

== History ==
The company was formed based on a casual conversation between Long Island, New York hippie record shop co-owner, musician, and blues scholar Tom Pomposello, and college student, former musician, and amateur recording engineer Fred Seibert, when Pomposello was musing about the best way to record and release his band's music. Seibert suggested a major label was a thing of the past and the way of the future was that Pomposello should record himself. The two quickly formed a partnership.

Seibert hosted a Columbia University, WKCR-FM radio show, and had recorded Pomposello when he accompanied legendary country blues artist Mississippi Fred McDowell at The Gaslight Cafe in November 1971. They agreed that the tapes were a commercial offering that could be used to launch the label. Pomposello suggested the tongue-in-cheek name Oblivion, cadged from an obscure Leo Kottke album, mistakenly believing the name to be a satire.

Along with third partner Dick Pennington, who provided the initial financing, Oblivion released its maiden album, Mississippi Fred McDowell: Live in New York in the spring of 1972. 1972 also saw the release of the label's only 45rpm single, "Johnny Woods: Mississippi Harmonica" from Fred McDowell's sometime musical partner, harmonica player Johnny Woods.

Seibert's interest was jazz, and by the end of 1972 the first jazz session was recorded, pointing the company towards the future. Marc Cohen (who eventually changed his last name and primary instrument) was a former Columbia student and mainstream jazz alto saxophone player who came to WKCR with a trio and his saxophone plugged into an Echoplex and amplifier. Seibert heard kinship with Miles Davis', Tony Williams', and John McLaughlin's electronic experiments, and with the addition of guitarist John Abercrombie recorded one of the earliest "electronic jazz" records, soon to be known as jazz fusion. The album (five stars from Down Beat Magazine) was named "Friends" (Copland felt it was a collective effort), with a cover by a Columbia University based "outsider" Sam Steinberg, it was Oblivion's third release.

Pomposello's blues scholarship was increasing and one area of particular interest was the state of the form in the immediate New York City metropolitan area, Oblivion's home territory. Never a deep hotbed of traditional blues (Chicago, Illinois was the Northern U.S. center of the music), nevertheless New York had a reliable output over the postwar years by such artists as Elmore James, Wilbert Harrison, and Buster Brown. When guitarist & vocalist Charles Walker visited WKCR, Pomposello made it his mission to record him over a year's time with various configurations of a dozen local players. Blues from the Apple came out in 1974 and fittingly credited to "Charles Walker & the New York City Blues Band."

Joe Lee Wilson was a mainstream jazz vocalist who was making his name in Manhattan's loft scene of the 1970s. He recorded a highly buzzed session at WKCR in 1972, which Oblivion launched as Livin' High Off Nickels and Dimes, a New York jazz radio sensation in the autumn of 1974.

Oblivion's last album was its inspiration. Honest Tom Pomposello was an album of Americana "roots music", spanning from the expected blues, to folk and R&B, utilizing nine musicians recorded over two years.

With only two mildly reliably commercial records, Fred McDowell's Live in New York and Joe Lee Wilson's Livin' High Off Nickels and Dimes, Oblivion found it could no longer be sustained off the passions and industry ignorance of its founders, the saga of many independent labels with inadequate capitalization. The company ceased initial operations in 1976.

== Activities in the digital era ==
Dick Pennington left company operations after Blues from the Apple, Tom Pomposello died after a car accident in 1999, and Fred Seibert went on to work in television, becoming a leading independent animation producer and a pioneer in digital video.

In 2001, Seibert—having led MTV Networks' Internet division and founding trailblazing video programmer Next New Networks—revived Oblivion's catalog, first in downloads and eventually in streaming audio on all global platforms. The company's activities are chronicled on a Tumblr blog. It dropped a new digital release in early 2022, and will make its final release, a limited edition 12" vinyl dance single in late 2026.

== Discography ==
All titles available on streaming services.

Cat. No.	Artist	Title	1st Oblivion release	Addition Information
OD-1	Mississippi Fred McDowell	Live in New York	1972	His last recording
OD-2	Johnny Woods	Mississippi Harmonica	1972	Field recording
OD-3	Marc Cohen, John Abercrombie, Clint Houston, Jeff Williams	Friends	1973	2021 bonus tracks added to digital release
OD-4	Charles Walker & The NYC Blues Band	Blues from the Apple	1974	
OD-5	Joe Lee Wilson	Livin' High Off Nickels & Dimes	1974	live radio performance
OD-6	Tom Pomposello	Honest Tom Pomposello	1975	
OD-7	Cecil Taylor Unit	Spring of Two Blue-J's	2021	partial 1973 concert recording
OD-8	Cecil Taylor Unit	The Complete, Legendary, Live Return Concert	2022	complete 1973 concert recording
OD-9	Oblivion Records Box Set	Complete 1972-1975	2015	
OD-11	Joe Lee Wilson	BEST Jazz Ain't Nothin' But Soul	2022	Curated from the 1975 release; 4 tracks
OD-12	Mississippi Fred McDowell	BEST Live Country Blues	2022	Curated from the complete 1971 recording; 12 tracks
OD-13	Charles Walker & The NYC Blues Band	BEST Blues from the Apple	2022	Curated from the 1975 release; 6 tracks
O#14	Mississippi Fred McDowell/Tom Pomposello/David Baron	Bull Dog Blues-Dance Mixes	Autumn 2026	2 tracks; limited edition 12" vinyl
