= Alan Goodman =

American writer

- Born: Alan Eliot Goodman; February 21, 1953 (age 73); Flemington, New Jersey, US
- Education: Columbia College, Columbia University
- Occupations: Media marketer; television writer; director; producer
- Years active: 1974–present

Alan Eliot Goodman is an American actor and media marketer. He is one of the founders of TESTD Inc, a health and data management products company. He was formerly a television writer and producer who has worked in media since 1981.

== Early life and education ==
Goodman began his media career while still in high school as a reporter at The Hunterdon County Democrat in Flemington, New Jersey. When entering Columbia University in 1970, he joined the college radio station, WKCR-FM where he first encountered his future collaborators, Albie Hecht and Fred Seibert.

== Cable television ==
In 1981, Goodman was part of the team that launched MTV alongside his college radio alumni Fred Seibert. Goodman supervised hundreds of animations and their accompanying soundtracks depicting the MTV trademark designed by Manhattan Design.

Seibert and Goodman resigned from MTV and started their own company Fred/Alan in New York. Together, they consulted with MTV's sister channel, Nickelodeon, which was having challenges finding audiences for their quality kids programming. They led the efforts to rebrand the network as "The First Kids' Network" and help build its new vocabulary, promotional strategies and execution.

Fred/Alan were MTV Networks' advertising agency, conceiving and creating Nick-at-Nite and launching VH-1. Goodman worked with MTV Networks, the parent company of both MTV and Nickelodeon, for over 30 years.

== Writing and production ==
Goodman co-created the television series Kids' Court, The Movie Masters (both with Albie Hecht) Hey Dude, The Mystery Files of Shelby Woo, among others. He also co-created the Nickelodeon Kids' Choice Awards. Goodman also wrote scripts for several television shows including Hey Dude, Clarissa Explains It All, Clifford's Puppy Days and JoJo's Circus. He was the co-producer and show runner for two seasons of Clarissa Explains It All.

Since 1984 Goodman has been the primary writer and creative director for the brochure and website essays of Mosaic Records' jazz boxes. This work is in addition to his liner note writing for various independent jazz recording labels.

During his consulting engagement at BBC America, Goodman wrote and produced entertainment news content and specials for the network. He was also one of the developers and first creative director at COZI-TV, a free-to-air television network owned by the NBC Owned Television Stations division of NBCUniversal. At COZI-TV he also wrote, directed, and produced original content, including the first ever fully auto-tuned TV program, Autotune The Munsters.

Goodman has written three books – A Slash in the Night, the first in a series of novels based on characters in Goodman's Nickelodeon series The Mystery Files of Shelby Woo, and The Big Help Book, and Fred/Alan: A Decade in Media History 1983-1992, a chronicle of his time running the world's first branding agency with his partner Fred Seibert. He also was a contributor to The Rolling Stone Record Guide. Goodman was a co-creator of the Virgin Comics (now Liquid Comics) title The Econauts.
