= Fred Seibert =

American television producer and media proprietor

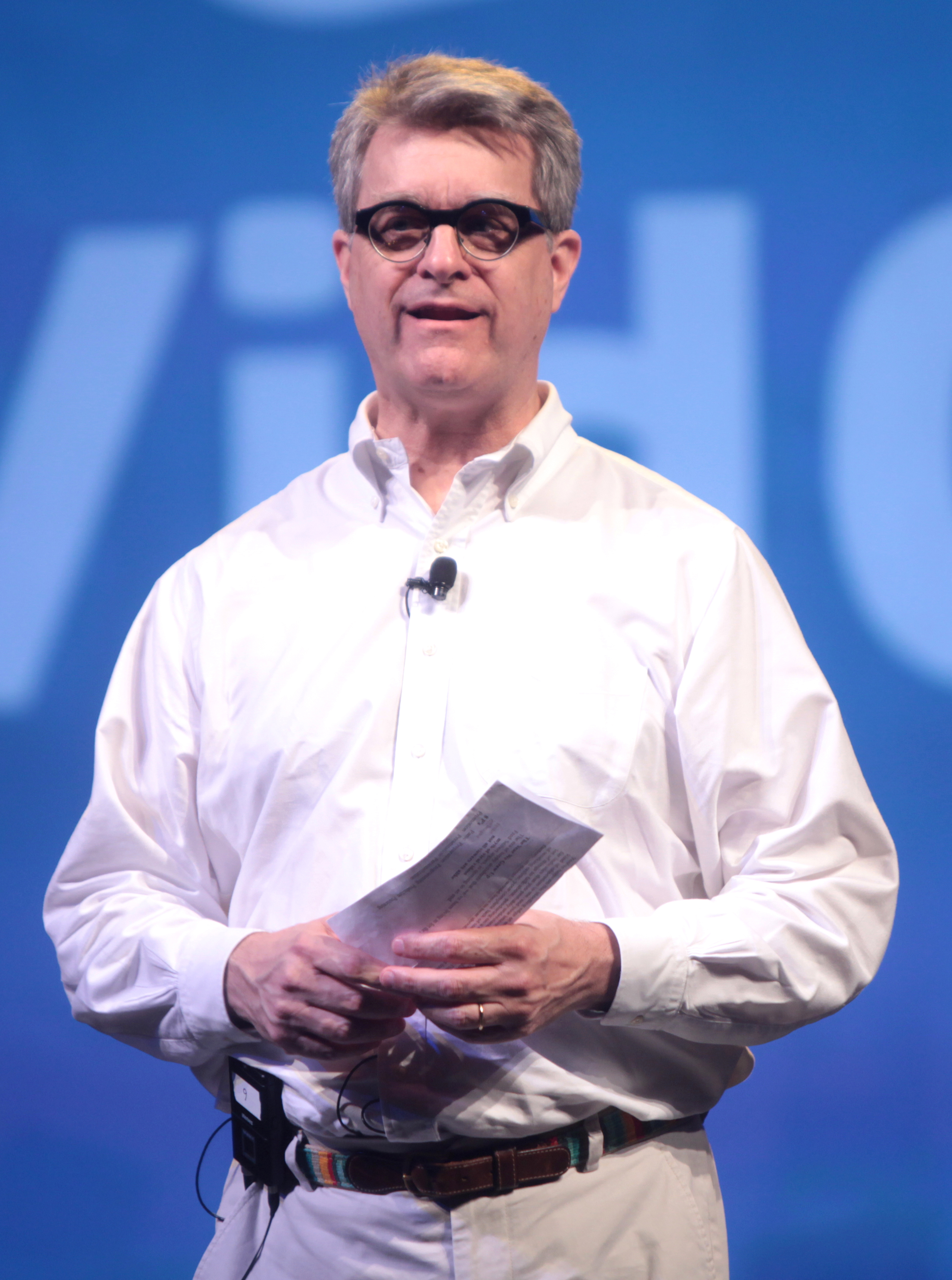
- Seibert at Vidcon 2014
- Occupations: Television producer; media proprietor
- Years active: 1975–present
- Works: Cartoon shorts filmography
- Website: fredfilms.com

Fred Seibert is an American television executive. Seibert began his professional career as a jazz and blues record producer and audio engineer in the 1970s. He co-founded the record label Oblivion Records by 1972 and has received a Grammy Award nomination.

Seibert was the first creative director for MTV during its formation stages in 1981, and served as a consultant for MTV Networks Online. He founded the production company Frederator Studios in 1998, as well as its spin-off entities Frederator Networks, Channel Frederator Network, and Cartoon Hangover. Having held numerous executive positions for Viacom Media Networks, he was the final president of animation studio Hanna-Barbera from 1992 to 1996. He has since co-founded Next New Networks, Bolder Media, and launched the production company FredFilms.

Seibert is an angel investor in technology and media-based startup projects. He was a seed investor for the website Tumblr, and has executive produced various animated and live-action series. He created the animation incubator anthology series What a Cartoon! in 1994, Oh Yeah! Cartoons in 1998, and Random! Cartoons in 2008; all three have spawned successful television programs as spin-offs, including The Fairly OddParents, Johnny Bravo, Dexter's Laboratory, Courage the Cowardly Dog, My Life as a Teenage Robot, The Powerpuff Girls, and Adventure Time—for most of which he has served as executive producer.

== Animated cartoons ==
In his time working in cartoons at three studios, Seibert has helped jumpstart the creator careers of over 100 animated filmmakers, including Genndy Tartakovsky. From 1992 until 1996, as the last president of the Hanna-Barbera cartoon studio, Seibert was able to reinvigorate the company's creative reputation with the establishment of the animation incubator What a Cartoon!. Modeled on the Golden Age of mid-20th century cartoons, the 48 short films from creators around the world, Hanna-Barbera was able to launch seven hit series after a dry spell since the launch of The Smurfs in 1981 for NBC. The shows included Genndy Tartakovsky's Dexter's Laboratory, David Feiss's Cow and Chicken and I Am Weasel, Van Partible's Johnny Bravo, John R. Dilworth's Courage the Cowardly Dog, and Craig McCracken's The Powerpuff Girls.

After Ted Turner included Hanna-Barbera in Turner Broadcasting's 1996 sale to Time Warner, Seibert established Frederator Studios as an independent animation producer based in Burbank, California.

Frederator has created cartoon series on Nickelodeon (including Rob Renzetti's My Life as a Teenage Robot), Cartoon Network (Pendleton Ward's Adventure Time), and Cartoon Hangover (Pendleton Ward's Bravest Warriors, Natasha Allegri's Bee and PuppyCat), and Kevin Kolde's production of Castlevania for Netflix.

Seibert created 250 short cartoons between 1995 and 2018 at Hanna-Barbera, Frederator Studios, 19 of which were continued as series at Cartoon Network, Nickelodeon, Cartoon Hangover, Netflix and YouTube.

Seibert has also created several Internet channels featuring cartoons, including Channel Frederator, Cartoon Hangover, and Next New Networks.

After starting Frederator Studios in 1997, Seibert brought together a group of investors in a failed attempt to save the troubled underground/alternative comics publisher Kitchen Sink Press.

Seibert's production of the first season of Natasha Allegri's Bee and PuppyCat for his Cartoon Hangover streaming channel was the most backed animated project on Kickstarter for several years. Season 2 was accidentally leaked onto Seibert's Vimeo channel in early 2020, but was eventually announced to be officially dropped on Netflix sometime in 2022.

Seibert stepped down from his position as CEO of Frederator in August 2020, though the company indicated that he would remain executive producer for current projects, including Bee & PuppyCat and Castlevania.

On February 23, 2021, Seibert announced the formation of cartoon production company FredFilms, with a first look deal at VIS Kids. The company is in various stages of production on five reboots of vintage Seibert productions, including a live-action The Fairly OddParents for Paramount+ and a CG animated version for Netflix. The company has developed several adult and children's original animated properties.

== Streaming video and Internet ==
In March 1999, MTV Networks CEO Tom Freston tapped Seibert to become the first president of the new MTV Networks Online, soon to split into MTV Interactive (The MTVi Group) and Nick.com. Building on this new media success, in 2007 Seibert co-founded Next New Networks (with Emil Rensing, Herb Scannell, Tim Shey, and Jed Simmons), a pioneer in streaming video, with over 2 billion video views and as of 2010 over 200 million views every month, making it, along with Maker Studios, creators of the Multi-channel networks. Along with their affiliated Indy Mogul, Barely Political, Channel Frederator and several other networks, the company's superdistribution allowed it to become among the most widely distributed video in the world, and to become YouTube's top professional content provider. By the end of 2010, Next New Networks had YouTube's top two videos. In March 2011, Next New Networks was acquired by YouTube.

In 2004, then-unknown web developer David Karp interned at Frederator Studios at its first New York City location, and built the company's first blogging platform. In 2007, Karp launched Tumblr from a rented desk at Frederator Studios' Park Avenue South offices, along with chief engineer Marco Arment. Seibert was one of Tumblr's first bloggers, an angel investor in the company, and served on its board before its acquisition.

Seibert was the original angel investor in Sawhorse Media in 2010, the company that created the Shorty Awards and MuckRack, a public relations management platform that enables organizations to connect with journalists to generate media coverage.

After creating Channel Frederator as the "first cartoon video podcast" and migrating it to YouTube in 2007, on February 21, 2012, Fred Seibert launched Cartoon Hangover, a channel on YouTube which consists of various animated shorts and series. Cartoon Hangover gained a much larger audience with the revival of Bravest Warriors by Pendleton Ward on November 8, 2012 which originally aired as a pilot on Fred Seibert's Random! Cartoons on Nicktoons Network in 2009. In 2014, Channel Frederator was revived as a multi-channel network focused entirely on animation, signing one of YouTube's biggest animation channels, Simon's Cat. By September 2014, the network was distributing 688 channels, with over 65 million monthly views and 10.5 million subscribers, and by 2017 announced it had reached 1 billion monthly views on YouTube.

Seibert and his Frederator Networks partnered with John Borthwick and Betaworks; Jonathan Miller, Jason Ostheimer, Shari Redstone; and entrepreneur Yoel Flohr to form Thirty Labs in 2014, a startup studio based in New York City to develop and invest in video based technology businesses. Seibert served as its CEO until its dissolution the following year.

== Media branding and cable television ==
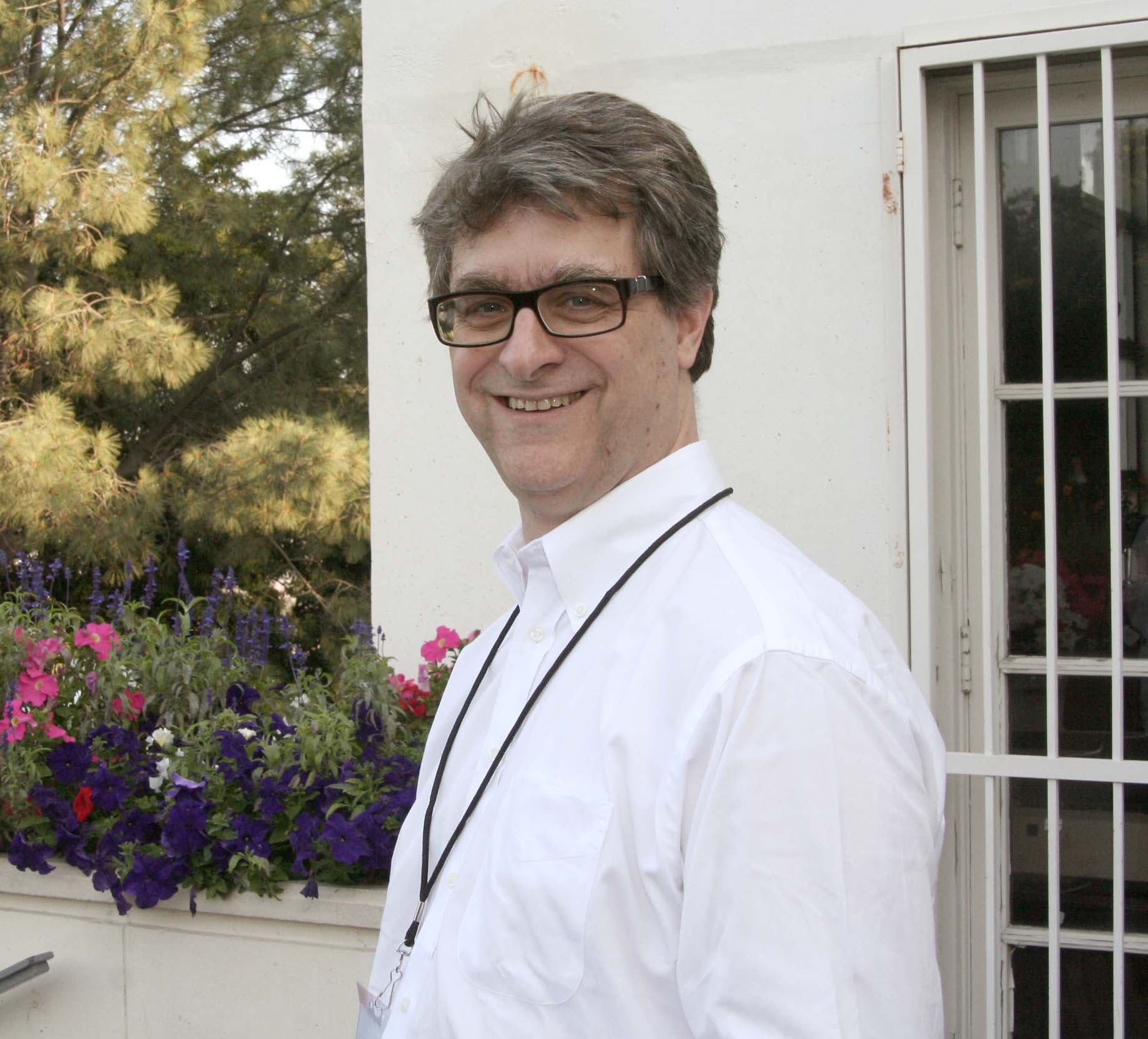
Fred Seibert at Pixelodeon in 2007

Seibert played a key role in the ascendance of the modern cable television age (1980–2010). As MTV's first creative director, Seibert was responsible for a complete rethinking of how the entire television industry was able to think of themselves as “brands.” He guided his team to develop the original voice and visual identity for MTV, and went on to do the same at Nickelodeon, Nick-at-Nite (which he invented with his long time creative partner Alan Goodman), and Comedy Central.

After a late 1970s stint with media promotion innovator Dale Pon at New York's WHN Radio, Seibert began his work at Warner-Amex Satellite Entertainment in 1980, original owner of Nickelodeon and The Movie Channel and would go on to launch MTV: Music Television on August 1, 1981.

Initially, MTV had none of the kinds of programs that were thought of as "television," only more than 160 hours (there are 168 hours in a week) of music videos that were about three minutes each, and with no set schedule that could be promoted. Seibert had to develop an alternative promotional strategy that was completely different than traditional networks. The promos and network identifications his team produced did not resemble anything TV had every seen before, focusing on an approach that subtly made a series of "promises" to viewers in the wildest and most creative ways possible. The network identifications, 10-seconds each, were based on the MTV logo he commissioned and approved, designed by the Manhattan Design collective (that included his oldest childhood friend, Frank Olinsky). The logo mutated its design hundreds, thousands of ways, sometimes within one short animated film. Some senior network executives objected to a logo that did not remain constant, but the approach ultimately prevailed. The 10-second network IDs and the promos ultimately influenced graphic design and advertising for years to come.

Within two years of launch, Seibert was part of the team that developed "I Want My MTV!", the channel's flagship advertising campaign.

In 1983, with partner Alan Goodman, Seibert founded Fred/Alan Inc. in New York City. Goodman had been one of his key creative lieutenants at MTV, and they had worked together in college radio a decade before. Together, they successfully adapted the MTV branding and promotional strategy to overhaul the then-floundering children's cable channel Nickelodeon between June 1984 and January 1985, moving it from worst to first in the ratings in six months, and continued overseeing network branding and promotion for eight more years.

By the end of 1985, at the request of Nickelodeon president Geraldine Laybourne Seibert and Goodman conceived a radical rethinking of television networks by creating Nick-at-Nite, pitched as "the first oldies TV network." Over the nine years of the company's existence they also did extensive work with The Movie Channel, Lifetime, Showtime, Comedy Central and Mosaic Records.

Seibert continued involvement with the cable TV industry for several years. He was employed by Turner Broadcasting as the last president of Hanna-Barbera Cartoons, then as a consultant for almost 15 years at Warner-Amex successor MTV Networks, and as a producer of several animated series for Nickelodeon and Cartoon Network.

== Musical career ==
Seibert began his media career in college radio at Columbia University's WKCR-FM in 1969. According to Seibert himself, he spent most of his time in college at the radio station headquarters rather than attending classes, and thus never graduated.

While at Columbia he co-founded his first company, Oblivion Records with partners Tom Pomposello and Dick Pennington, releasing LPs by Mississippi Fred McDowell (Live in New York) and Joe Lee Wilson. Simultaneously, he produced numerous jazz and blues albums for independent companies such as Muse Records, JCOA Records, and Birth Records (owned by instrumentalist/composer Gunter Hampel). Seibert was an early employee of New Music Distribution Service, a non-profit distributor of musician-owned record company started by composers Carla Bley and Michael Mantler, before going on the road with Bley's big band as sound engineer and road manager. Seibert announced the revival of Oblivion Records in 2021 for a digital release of a historic concert recording of jazz innovator Cecil Taylor.

== Accolades ==
Seibert's productions span multiple mediums in American entertainment. He was first recognized for his musical activity, having received a Grammy Award nomination at the 20th Annual Grammy Awards, and later several Annie Awards, Emmy Awards, and BAFTA Awards for his television productions. He received an American Institute of Graphic Arts (AIGA) Medal for lifetime exceptional achievements in 2000, was inducted to the Animation Magazine Hall of Fame in 2017. In November 2023, the National Academy of Television Arts and Sciences (presenters of the Emmy Awards) announced his induction into their "Gold Circle," defined as performing "...distinguished service within the industry, setting standards for achievement, mentoring, leadership, and professional accolades for 50...years, respectively. They represent the best and the brightest in the television community."

== Filmography ==
- Fred Seibert cartoon shorts filmography
