= Mississippi Fred McDowell =

American blues musician (1904–1972)

Fred McDowell
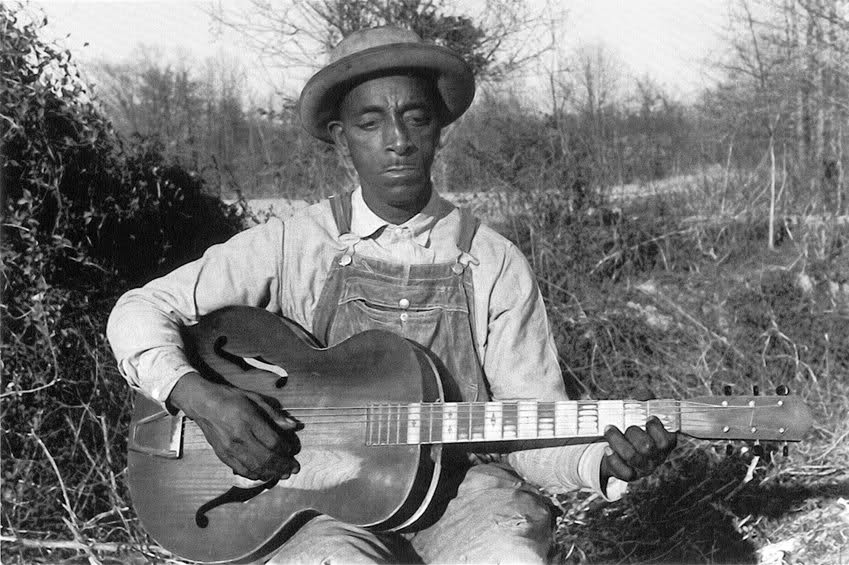
- McDowell in 1960

Background information
- Born: January 12, 1904; Rossville, Tennessee, U.S.
- Died: July 3, 1972 (aged 68) Memphis, Tennessee, U.S.
- Genres: Hill country blues
- Occupations: Musician; singer-songwriter
- Instruments: Guitar; vocals
- Years active: 1926–1972
- Labels: Arhoolie; Testament; Sire; Transatlantic; Infinite Zero; Oblivion; Rounder; Fat Possum

Fred McDowell (January 12, 1904 – July 3, 1972), known by his stage name Mississippi Fred McDowell, was an American singer-songwriter and guitarist of hill country blues music.

== Career ==
McDowell was born in Rossville, Tennessee. His parents were farmers, who both died while Fred was in his youth. He took up the guitar at the age of 14 and was soon playing for tips at dances around Rossville. Seeking a change from plowing fields, he moved to Memphis in 1926, where he worked in the Buck-Eye feed mill, which processed cotton into oil and other products. In 1928, he moved to Mississippi to pick cotton. He finally settled in Como, Mississippi, around 1940, where he worked as a full-time farmer for many years while continuing to play music on weekends at dances and picnics.

After decades of playing for small local gatherings, McDowell was recorded in 1959 by roving folklore musicologist Alan Lomax and Shirley Collins, on their Southern Journey field-recording trip. With interest in blues and folk music rising in the United States at the time, McDowell's field recordings for Lomax caught the attention of blues aficionados and record producers, and within a couple of years, he had finally become a professional musician and recording artist in his own right. His LPs proved quite popular, and he performed at festivals and clubs all over the world.

McDowell continued to perform the blues in the north Mississippi style much as he had for decades, sometimes on electric guitar rather than acoustic guitar. He was particularly renowned for his mastery of slide guitar, a style he said he first learned using a pocketknife for a slide and later a polished beef rib bone. He ultimately settled on the clearer sound he got from a glass bottleneck slide, which he wore on his ring finger. While he famously declared, "I do not play no rock and roll," he was not averse to associating with younger rock musicians. He coached Bonnie Raitt on slide guitar technique and was reportedly flattered by the Rolling Stones' rather straightforward version of his "You Gotta Move" on their 1971 album Sticky Fingers. In 1965, he toured Europe with the American Folk Blues Festival, together with Big Mama Thornton, John Lee Hooker, Buddy Guy, Roosevelt Sykes and others.

McDowell's 1969 album I Do Not Play No Rock 'n' Roll, recorded at Malaco Studios in Jackson, Mississippi, and released by Capitol Records, was his first featuring electric guitar. It contains parts of an interview in which he discusses the origins of the blues and the nature of love. His live album Live at the Mayfair Hotel (1995) was from a concert he gave in 1969. Tracks included versions of Bukka White's "Shake 'Em On Down", Willie Dixon's "My Babe", Mance Lipscomb's "Evil Hearted Woman", plus McDowell's self-penned "Kokomo Blues." AllMusic noted that the album "may be the best single CD in McDowell's output, and certainly his best concert release". McDowell's final album, Live in New York (Oblivion Records), was a concert performance from November 1971 at the Village Gaslight (also known as The Gaslight Cafe), in Greenwich Village, New York.

McDowell's version of the folk song "John Henry" from 1969 is included on the Ann Arbor Blues Festival 1969: Vols 1&2, 2019 release.

== Death and influence ==
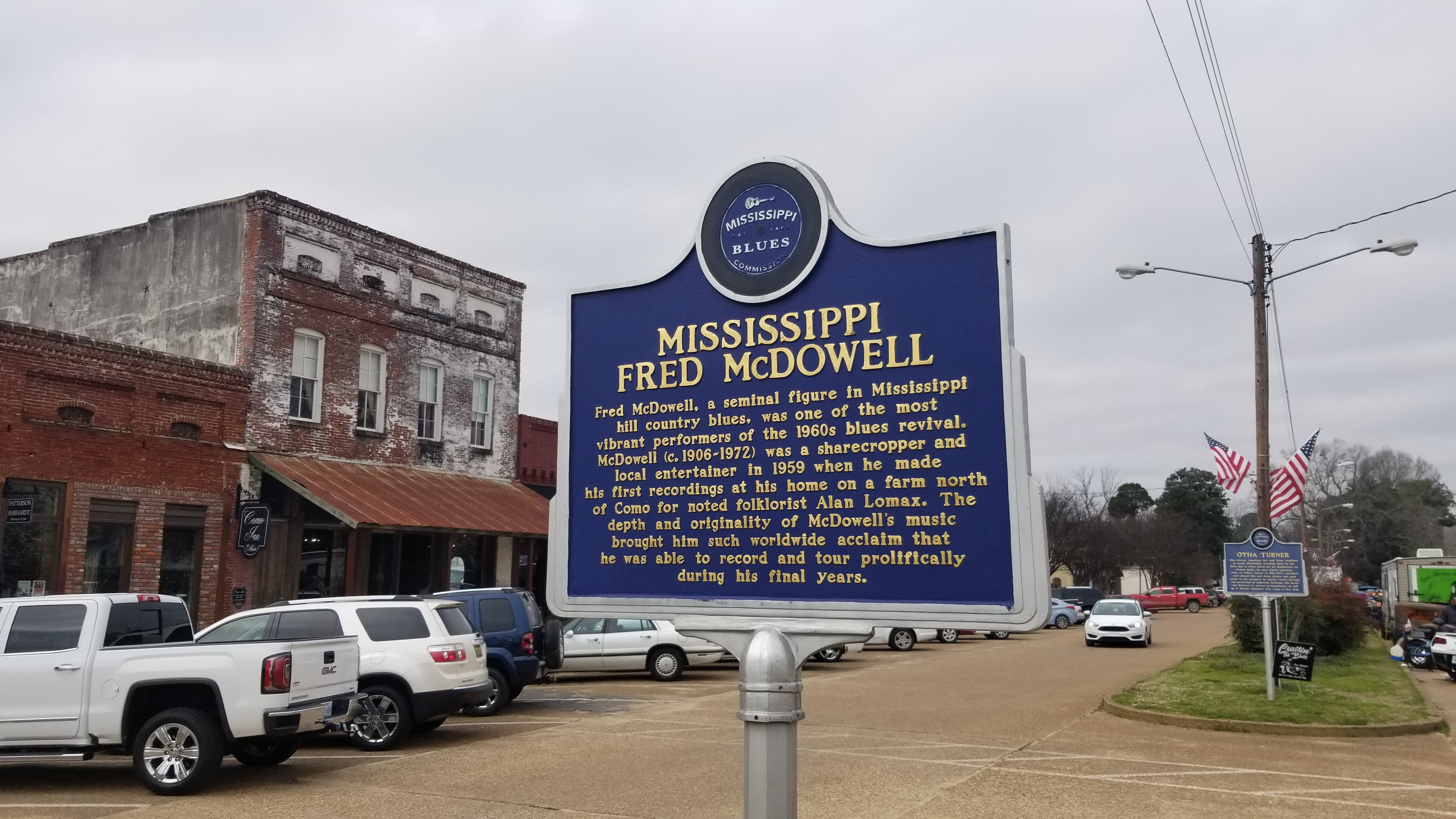
Mississippi Blues Trail marker of McDowell in Como, Mississippi

McDowell died of cancer on July 3, 1972, aged 68, and was buried at Hammond Hill Baptist Church, between Como and Senatobia, Mississippi. On August 6, 1993, a memorial was placed on his grave by the Mount Zion Memorial Fund. The ceremony was presided over by the blues promoter Dick Waterman, and the memorial with McDowell's portrait on it. The memorial stone was a replacement for an inaccurate (McDowell's name was misspelled) and damaged marker. The original stone was subsequently donated by McDowell's family to the Delta Blues Museum, in Clarksdale, Mississippi. McDowell was a Freemason and was associated with Prince Hall Freemasonry; he was buried in Masonic regalia.

Musician Bonnie Raitt cited McDowell as an influence in 1996.

== Bibliography ==
- Ferris, William (1988). Blues from the Delta. Rev. ed. Da Capo Press. ISBN 0-306-80327-5. ISBN 978-0306803277.
- Ferris, William (2009). Give My Poor Heart Ease: Voices of the Mississippi Blues. University of North Carolina Press. ISBN 0-8078-3325-8. ISBN 978-0807833254 (with CD and DVD).
- Ferris, William, and Hinson, Glenn (2009). The New Encyclopedia of Southern Culture. Vol. 14, Folklife. University of North Carolina Press. ISBN 0-8078-3346-0. ISBN 978-0-8078-3346-9.
- Gioia, Ted (2009). Delta Blues: The Life and Times of the Mississippi Masters Who Revolutionized American Music. W. W. Norton. ISBN 0-393-33750-2. ISBN 978-0393337501.
- Harris, Sheldon (1979). Blues Who's Who. Da Capo Press.
- Herzhaft, Gérard, Encyclopedia of the Blues (Arkansas Press)
- Lomax, Alan (1993). The Land Where the Blues Began. New York: Pantheon.
- Nicholson, Robert (1999). Mississippi Blues Today! Da Capo Press. ISBN 0-306-80883-8, ISBN 978-0-306-80883-8.
- Palmer, Robert (1982). Deep Blues: A Musical and Cultural History of the Mississippi Delta. Penguin reprint ed. ISBN 0-14-006223-8. ISBN 978-0-14-006223-6.
- Wilson, Charles Reagan; Ferris, William; Adadie, Ann J. (1989). Encyclopedia of Southern Culture. 2nd ed. University of North Carolina Press. ISBN 0-8078-1823-2. ISBN 978-0-8078-1823-7.
