= Saw Mill River Parkway =

Highway in New York

Saw Mill River Parkway
- Saw Mill River Parkway highlighted in red

Route information
- Maintained by NYSDOT
- Length: 29.83 mi (48.01 km)
- Existed: 1954–present
- Restrictions: No commercial vehicles or drivers with learner's permits south of exit 43

Major junctions
- South end: Henry Hudson Parkway / Mosholu Parkway at the Van Cortlandt Park–Yonkers line
- Cross County Parkway in Yonkers; I-87 / New York Thruway in Elmsford; I-87 / I-287 / New York Thruway / NY 119 in Elmsford; Taconic State Parkway in Hawthorne; NY 120 in Chappaqua; NY 133 in Mount Kisco
- North end: I-684 / NY 35 in Katonah

Location
- Country: United States
- State: New York
- Counties: Westchester

Highway system
- New York Highways; Interstate; US; State; Reference; Parkways

The Saw Mill River Parkway (also known as the Saw Mill Parkway or the Saw Mill) is a limited-access parkway that extends for 29.83 miles (48.01 km) through Westchester County, New York, in the United States. It begins at the border between Westchester County and the Bronx, as the continuation of the Henry Hudson Parkway leaving New York City, and heads generally northeastward to an interchange with Interstate 684 (I-684). At its north end, the parkway serves as a collector/distributor road as it passes east of the hamlet of Katonah. The parkway is named for the Saw Mill River, which the highway parallels for most of its length.

The Saw Mill serves as an important connection from the Taconic State Parkway to the Tappan Zee Bridge and New York State Thruway. It is an expressway, but not a freeway as several of its exits are signalized at-grade intersections. The Saw Mill River Parkway is inventoried by the New York State Department of Transportation (NYSDOT) as New York State Route 987D (NY 987D), an unsigned reference route designation.

== Route description ==
=== Yonkers to Elmsford ===
The Saw Mill River Parkway begins at the Bronx–Westchester line in Van Cortlandt Park as a continuation of the Henry Hudson Parkway. The Saw Mill River winds northward and parallels a former railroad grade into Yonkers. Southbound in southeast Yonkers there is a ramp to McLean Avenue. Passing Tibbetts Lake, the Saw Mill River winds northward alongside the railroad grade as a six-lane freeway as it enters Exit 4, which serves as the western terminus of the Cross County Parkway. Immediately after the Cross County, the parkway narrows to four lanes, and Exit 5 forks off on a 180-degree turn for Yonkers Avenue and nearby Dunwoodie Golf Course. The parkway enters Exit 5A, which services Palmer Road in Northwest Yonkers.

Winding northward through Yonkers, the Saw Mill River Parkway enters Exit 7, a ramp to NY 9A and Tuckahoe Road via Rossiter Avenue. After Exit 7, the parkway begins paralleling Saw Mill River and NY 9A, now known as Saw Mill River Road, near the Runyon Heights neighborhood. The railroad grade returns near Odell Avenue overpass on the northbound side. Upon entering Exit 9, the parkway becomes a four-lane expressway and enters a series of signaled at-grade interchanges. The first is Exit 9, which serves Executive Boulevard in Yonkers. This is followed by Hearst Street at Exit 10 and Tompkins Avenue at Exit 11. Just north of Exit 11, the Saw Mill River Parkway crosses the city line and enters the town of Hastings-on-Hudson. In Hastings-on-Hudson, the Saw Mill enters Exit 12, an at-grade interchange with the southern terminus of Farragut Parkway (NY 987J).

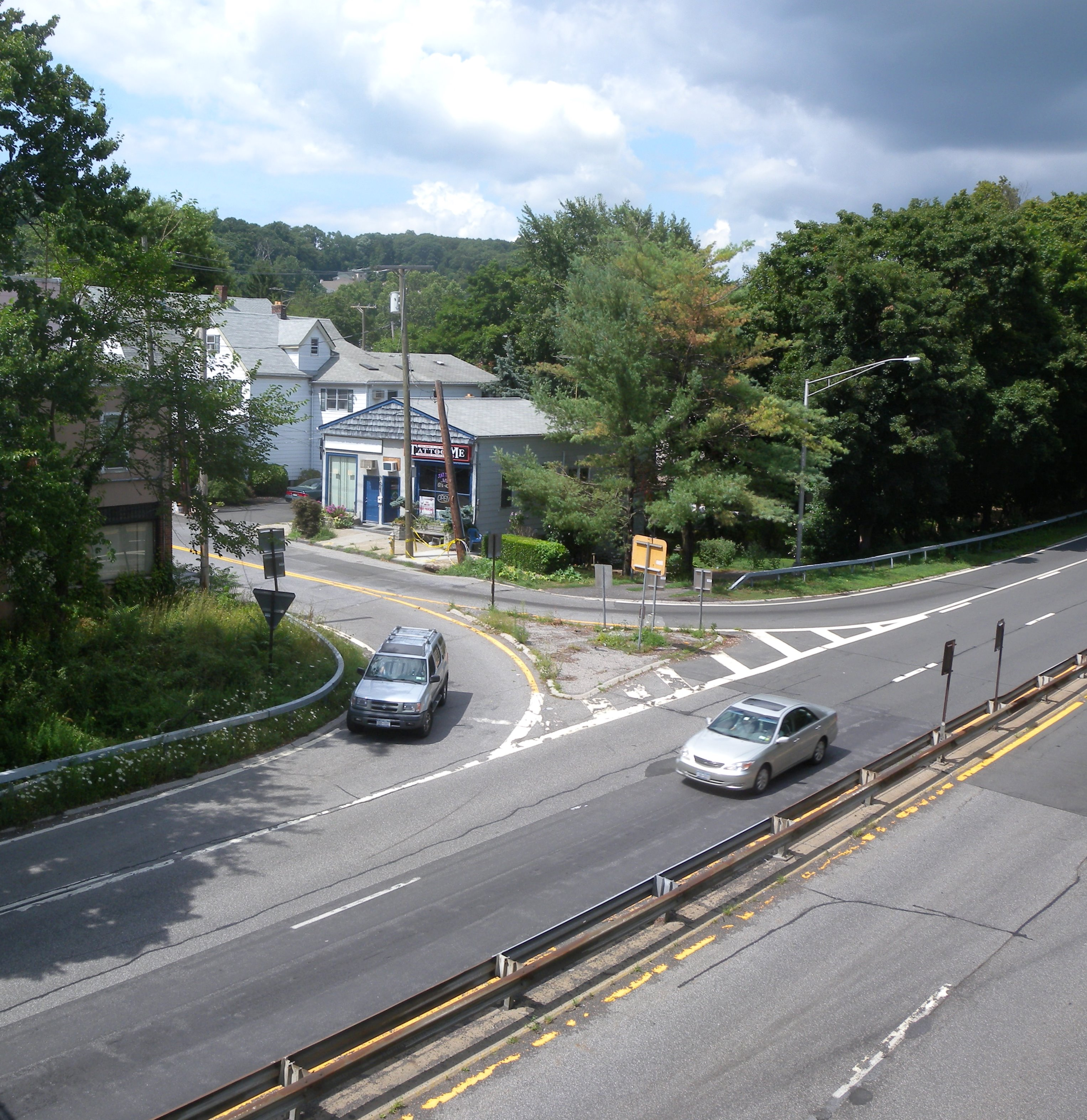
The Ashford Avenue interchange (Exit 17) in Dobbs Ferry

The next exit, designated Exit 13, is a right-in/right-out interchange with Farragut Avenue on both sides of the highway. The four-lane parkway winds north through Hastings-on-Hudson, passing through several suburban sections of town. Keeping in close contact with NY 9A, the Saw Mill River and the railroad grade, Exit 14 splits off southbound at Clarence Avenue. Exit 15 also forks off southbound at an intersection with Cliff Street before the Saw Mill River Parkway crosses into Dobbs Ferry. Upon entering Dobbs Ferry, the parkway enters an intersection with Lawrence Street (Exit 16) and creeps closer to the New York State Thruway (I-87). In Dobbs Ferry, the parkway enters Exit 17, the first full interchange since Tuckahoe Road, connecting to Ashford Avenue and NY 9A.

Continuing northbound through Dobbs Ferry, the southbound parkway enters an intersection with Cyrus Field Road before crossing into Irvington. Through Irvington, the Saw Mill River Parkway parallels the Thruway and the river before turning northeast and crossing into Greenburgh and Exit 20. Exit 20 serves the New York State Thruway northbound via a flyover ramp. After Exit 20, the Saw Mill River Parkway proceeds northeast on a parallel of NY 9A. Continuing alongside the namesake river, the parkway leaves Greenburgh for Elmsford, entering Exit 21E and Exit 21W, which services NY 119 (Main Street) via separate ramps. After a dart to the northwest, the Saw Mill River Parkway crosses under the Cross Westchester Expressway (I-287). While there is no ramp northbound, Exit 22 forks southbound to the westbound Cross Westchester.

=== Elmsford to Katonah ===
Crossing back into Greenburgh, the Saw Mill River Parkway continues northwest away from the Saw Mill River. After turning northbound, the parkway enters the Eastview section of Greenburgh, reaching Exit 23, which serves Old Saw Mill River Road. Exit 23 is the only interchange in Greenburgh as the parkway proceeds into the town of Mount Pleasant. In Mount Pleasant, the parkway enters Exit 25 northbound, a small ramp to NY 9A (Saw Mill River Road). Crossing over the Saw Mill River once again, the parkway winds northeast into Exit 26 near an overpass of NY 9A and NY 100 (Saw Mill River Road). Exit 26, just to the east of NY 9A/NY 100, services the Taconic State Parkway in the center of Graham Hills County Park via several flyover ramps. Just to the southeast of the interchange is the Hawthorne Metro-North Railroad station.

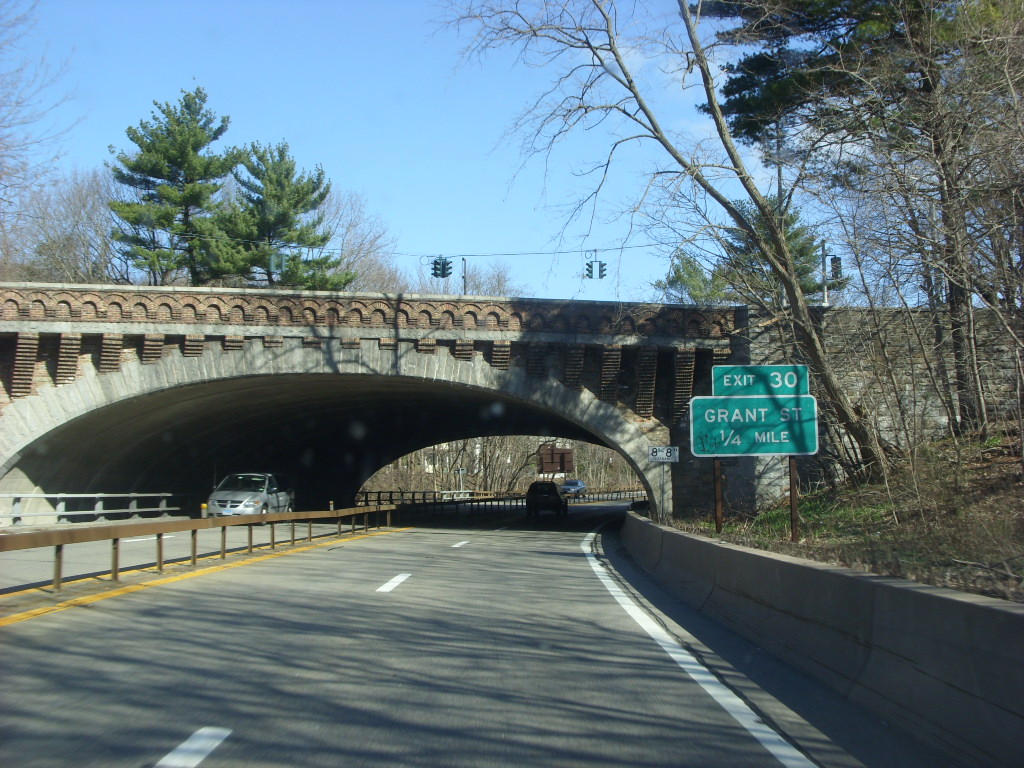
The Saw Mill River Parkway approaching Exit 30 (Grant Street) in Pleasantville

The Saw Mill River Parkway crosses northeast through Graham Hills County Park, paralleling the Harlem Line and NY 141 through Mount Pleasant. The parkway passes west of the former Thornwood station before turning northwest and away from NY 141. Just after the turn, Exit 27 comes at-grade, a junction with Marble Avenue, which connects to NY 141. The parkway runs along a short westbound stretch, crossing into the village of Pleasantville. Going northward in Pleasantville, Exit 28 forks off northbound only to Bedford Road, which connects to downtown Pleasantville. Proceeding southbound, Exit 29 accesses NY 117 (Pleasantville Road). The parkway turns northeast and enters Exit 30 for Grant Street near the Pleasantville Metro-North station.

The Saw Mill River Parkway and the Harlem Line parallel once again in the northern reaches of Pleasantville, paralleling the Saw Mill River into the town of New Castle. Now in the hamlet of Chappaqua, Exit 32 accesses NY 120 at Mill River Road. Nearby this interchange is the Chappaqua Metro-North station. After crossing under NY 120, the northbound Exit 32 connects to Hunts Place, which connects to NY 120. Running along a hillside in New Castle, the parkway becomes a divided highway for a short distance, becoming a two-lane roadway northbound. No interchange is present along this stretch and the lanes come back together just south of Exit 33, an at-grade intersection with Reader's Digest Road. At this interchange, the parkway has access to the former global headquarters of Reader's Digest and nearby NY 117.

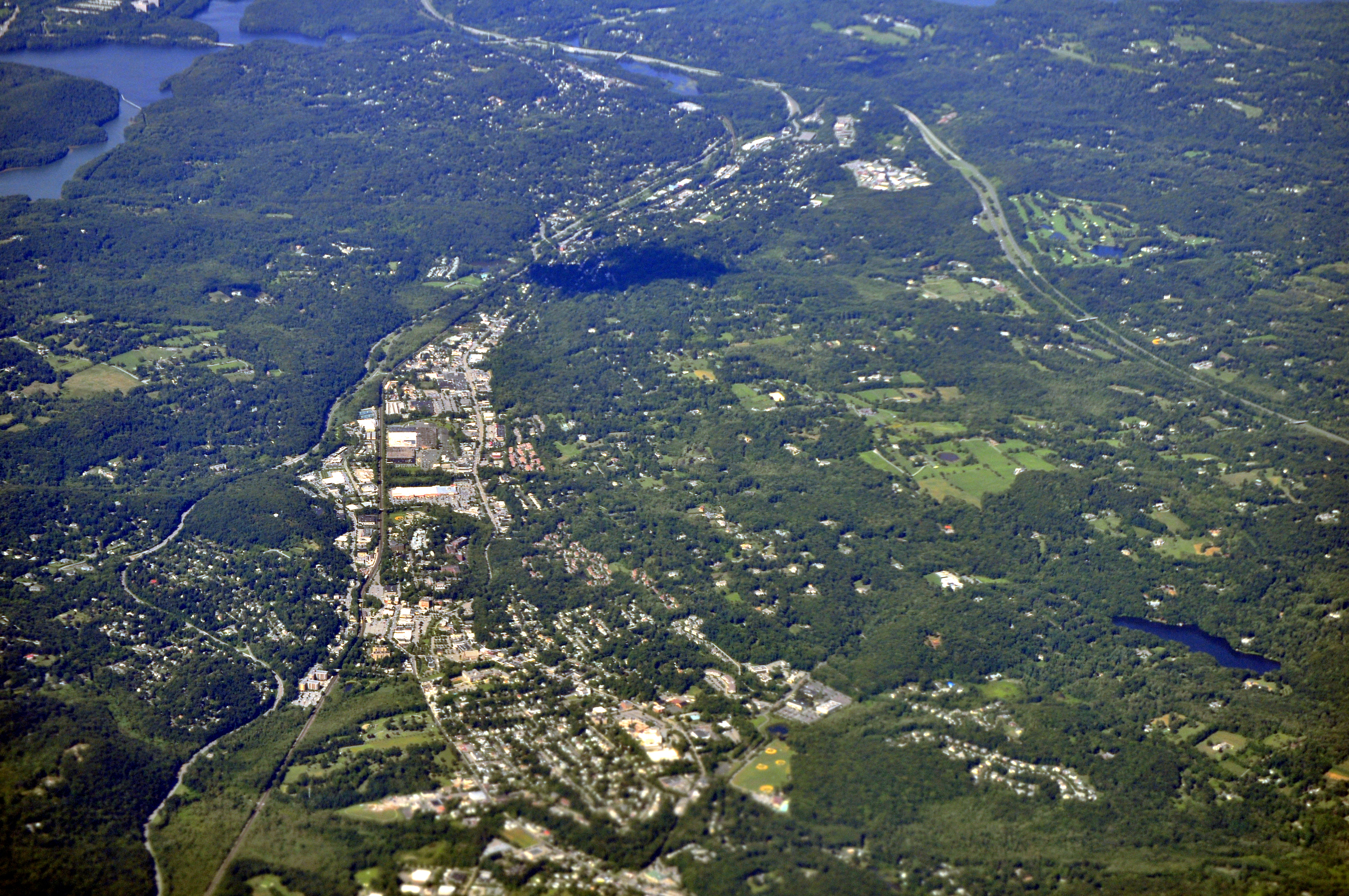
From lower left to top center, the Saw Mill River Parkway skirts the west edge of Mount Kisco before joining Interstate 684 near Katonah. (Aerial view, 2013)

The parkway continues northeast through the town of New Castle, passing northwest of the Mount Kisco Country Club before entering the village of Mount Kisco. Just southwest of the Mount Kisco Metro-North station, the parkway and railroad fork in different directions, with the parkway turning north into Exit 34, an interchange with NY 133 (West Main Street). In the northern reaches of Mount Kisco, Exit 36 services Croton Avenue from the southbound lanes. Just to the north, the Saw Mill River Parkway enters Exit 37, an interchange with Kisco Avenue. Now in the town of Bedford, the parkway enters Exit 38, a right-in/right-out interchange with Green Lane on both sides of the highway. Green Lane is also the first at-grade intersection on the Saw Mill River Parkway southbound.

Crossing south of Bedford Hills Memorial Park, the Saw Mill River Parkway enters the hamlet of Bedford Hills. In Bedford Hills, the parkway enters Exit 39, which connects to the hamlet and NY 117 (Bedford Road). Also present at this interchange is the Bedford Hills Metro-North station. The parkway divides once again through Bedford Hills, paralleling NY 117 through the community. The parkway then enters Exit 42, an interchange for NY 117 and Railroad Avenue. At Harris Road, NY 117 crosses over the parkway, paralleling the northbound lanes of the Saw Mill River Parkway on a nearby bypass. NY 117 soon merges into the Saw Mill River Parkway (Exit 43 southbound) before the Saw Mill River Parkway enters the right-of-way for I-684, where the parkway terminates just east of Katonah.

== History ==
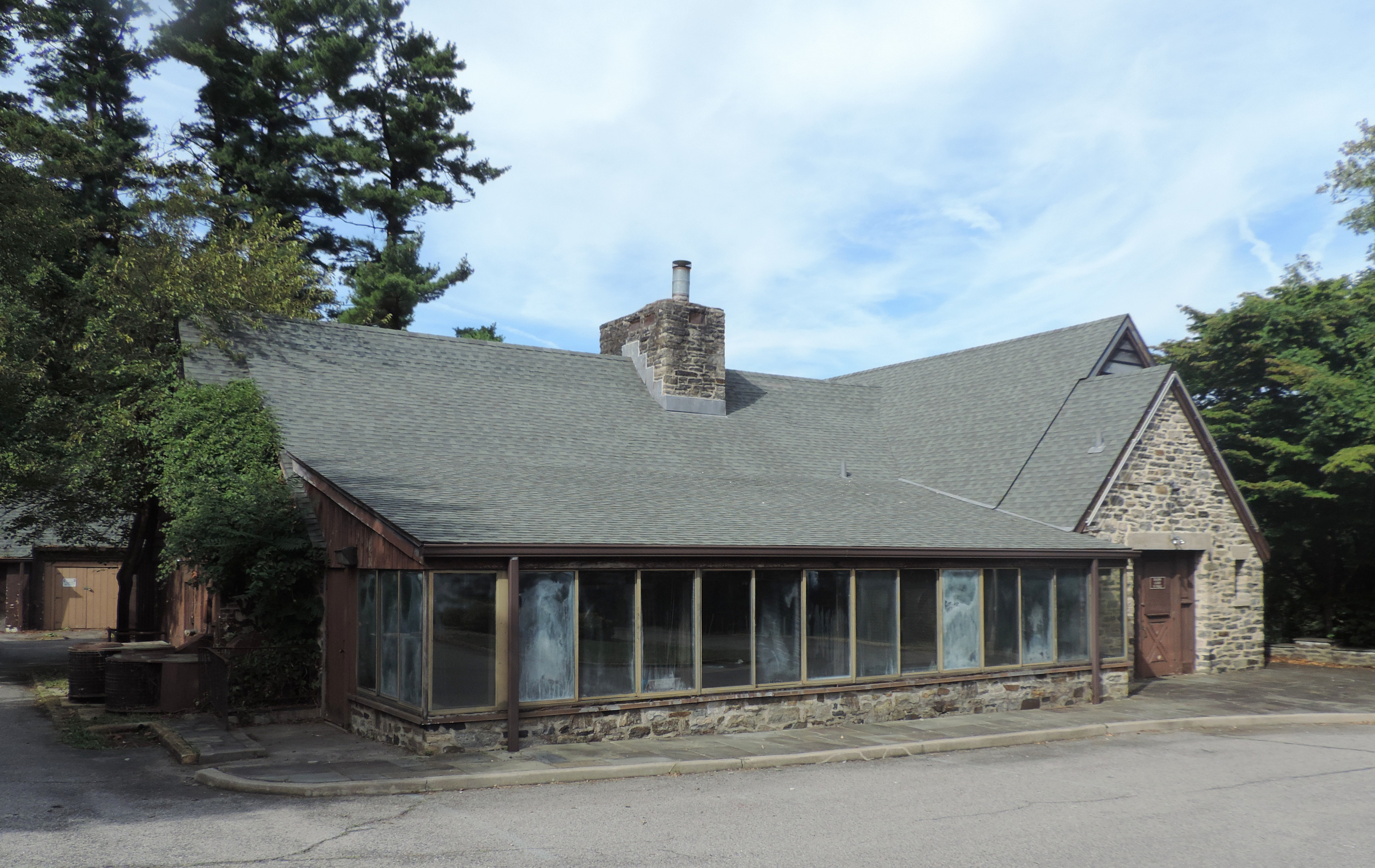
The former La Cantina restaurant, which served early motorists and closed its doors in 1995

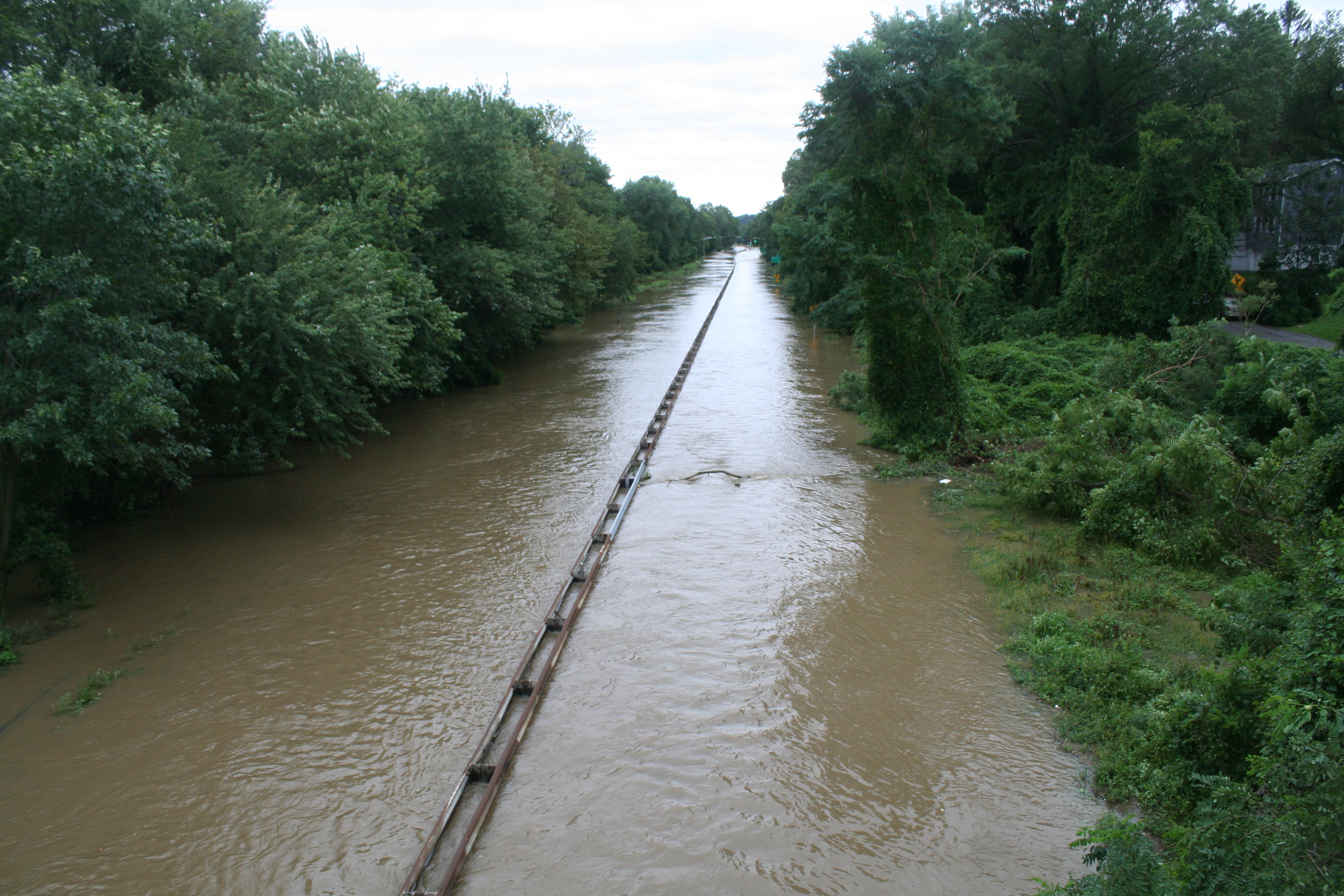
Flooded Saw Mill River Parkway after Hurricane Irene

Construction started on the Saw Mill Parkway in 1926. By 1930, it had reached Route 119 in Elmsford. Construction had only reached Chappaqua by 1940 when World War II halted any further progress. The Saw Mill Parkway was constructed along the Saw Mill River along with a sewer which was to both drain sewage from Yonkers and act as flood control for points north. The full length of the parkway was opened in 1955.

The parkways northern terminus originally merged into NY 117 at-grade. However, with construction of I-684, the need for a connection between the two roads became apparent, which opened in 1970. The road’s southern terminus was originally at the Hawthorne Circle, a former traffic circle. at the intersection of the Taconic Parkway extension from the Bronx River Parkway, Taconic, and Saw Mill River parkways. From 1969 to 1972, the circle was rebuilt into an interchange.

NYSDOT has maintained the Saw Mill River Parkway since 1980, after abolition of the East Hudson Parkway Authority. That same year, rest stops along the route closed.

Under NYSDOT, the 25¢ toll between exits 3 and 4, which was originally implemented by Westchester County in 1936, was removed on October 31, 1994. The tolls were also abolished on the Hutchinson River Parkway in November 1994.

In 2003, exit 19 and exit 38 were reconstructed from interactions to interchanges in order to increase safety.

The portion of road from exit 17 to exit 23 underwent an improvement that was completed in 2009.

The portion from exit 32 to the northern terminus was rehabilitated as part of a project completed in 2011.

== Exit list ==
County	Location	mi	km	Exit	Destinations	Notes
Bronx–Westchester county line	Van Cortlandt Park–Yonkers line	0.00	0.00	–	Henry Hudson Parkway south / Mosholu Parkway south to I-87 south – Manhattan	Continuation south
Westchester	Yonkers	0.30	0.48	3	McLean Avenue – Yonkers	Southbound exit and entrance; access via Putnam Avenue
Westchester	Yonkers	1.73	2.78	4	Cross County Parkway east to Hutchinson River Parkway	Western terminus and exit 2 on Cross County Parkway
Westchester	Yonkers	1.90	3.06	4A	Rumsey Road	No northbound exit
Westchester	Yonkers	1.90	3.06	5	Yonkers Avenue – Yonkers	No southbound entrance; no southbound access to Yonkers Ave. east; Yonkers not signed southbound
Westchester	Yonkers	2.60	4.18	5A	Palmer Road – Yonkers	
Westchester	Yonkers	3.10	4.99	6	Lockwood Avenue	Southbound exit and entrance; access via Manning Avenue
Westchester	Yonkers	3.40	5.47	7	NY 9A / Tuckahoe Road – Yonkers	Northbound exit and entrance; access via Rossiter Avenue; NY 9A not signed
Westchester	Yonkers	4.45	7.16	Northern end of freeway section		
Westchester	Yonkers	4.45	7.16	9	Executive Boulevard – Yonkers	At-grade intersection with northbound jughandle
Westchester	Yonkers	4.80	7.72	10	Hearst Street	At-grade intersection
Westchester	Yonkers	5.10	8.21	11	Tompkins Avenue	At-grade intersection
Westchester	Hastings-on-Hudson	5.20	8.37	12	Farragut Parkway – Hastings-on-Hudson	At-grade intersection
Westchester	Hastings-on-Hudson	5.40	8.69	13	Farragut Avenue	Right-in/right-out connections only
Westchester	Hastings-on-Hudson	5.80	9.33	14	Clarence Avenue	Southbound at-grade intersection; exit number not signed
Westchester	Hastings-on-Hudson	6.30	10.14	15	Cliff Street	Southbound at-grade intersection
Westchester	Dobbs Ferry	6.80	10.94	16	Lawrence Street	At-grade intersection
Westchester	Dobbs Ferry	7.60	12.23	17	Ashford Avenue – Dobbs Ferry, Ardsley	
Westchester	Dobbs Ferry	8.20	13.20	18	Cyrus Field Road	Southbound at-grade intersection; exit number not signed
Westchester	Dobbs Ferry	8.40	13.52	19	South County Trailway, Woodlands Lake	Northbound exit and entrance; exit number not signed
Westchester	Elmsford	9.70– 10.20	15.61– 16.42	20	I-87 north (New York Thruway) to I-287 – Tappan Zee Bridge	No southbound exit; exit 7A on I-87 / Thruway
Westchester	Elmsford	9.70– 10.20	15.61– 16.42		Mountain Road	Southbound at-grade intersection
Westchester	Elmsford	10.90– 11.20	17.54– 18.02	21	NY 119 – Elmsford, Tarrytown	Signed as exits 21E (east) and 21W (west) northbound; Tarrytown not signed southbound
Westchester	Elmsford	11.50	18.51	22	I-87 / I-287 west / New York Thruway / NY 119 – Albany, New York City, Tarrytown	Southbound exit and northbound entrance; exits 8A-8 on I-87 / I-287 / Thruway
Westchester	Greenburgh	13.10	21.08	23	Old Saw Mill River Road – Eastview	Signed as Saw Mill River Road
Westchester	Mount Pleasant	14.17	22.80	25	NY 9A to NY 100 (NY 141 north) – Hawthorne	Northbound exit and entrance
Westchester	Hawthorne	15.71	25.28	26	Taconic State Parkway to Sprain Brook Parkway / Bronx River Parkway – Albany, New York City	Same-directional access only; Taconic Parkway not signed southbound; exit 3 on Taconic Parkway
Westchester	Thornwood	17.30	27.84	27	Marble Avenue – Thornwood	At-grade intersection
Westchester	Pleasantville	18.04	29.03	28	Bedford Road – Pleasantville	Northbound exit only; former NY 117
Westchester	Pleasantville	18.20	29.29	29	NY 117 (Manville Road) – Pleasantville	Southbound exit and entrance
Westchester	Pleasantville	18.50	29.77	30	Grant Street	At-grade intersection; no southbound turns or northbound left
Westchester	Chappaqua	20.40	32.83	32	NY 120 – Chappaqua	Access via Hunts Place/Mill River Road
Westchester	New Castle	22.20	35.73	33	Roaring Brook Road to Reader's Digest Road	At-grade intersection
Westchester	Mount Kisco	24.42	39.30	34	NY 133 – Mount Kisco	
Westchester	Mount Kisco	25.00	40.23	36	Croton Avenue	Southbound exit and entrance
Westchester	Mount Kisco	25.70	41.36	37	Kisco Avenue	
Westchester	Town of Bedford	26.30	42.33	38	Green Lane	Right-in/right-out connections only
Westchester	Bedford Hills	27.30	43.94	39	NY 117 – Bedford Hills	Signed as exits 39S (south) and 39N (north) southbound; no northbound entrance
Westchester	Town of Bedford	28.20	45.38	42	NY 117 (Harris Road) – Katonah	Signed for NY 117 southbound, Harris Road northbound
Westchester	Town of Bedford	29.00	46.67	43	NY 117 south	Southbound exit and northbound entrance; northern terminus of NY 117; all trucks must exit
Westchester	Town of Bedford	29.83	48.01	–	I-684 north – Brewster; NY 35 – Katonah, Cross River	Northern terminus; exit 5 on I-684
1.000 mi = 1.609 km; 1.000 km = 0.621 mi: Incomplete access
