= Thornwood station =

Metro-North Railroad station in New York

Thornwood
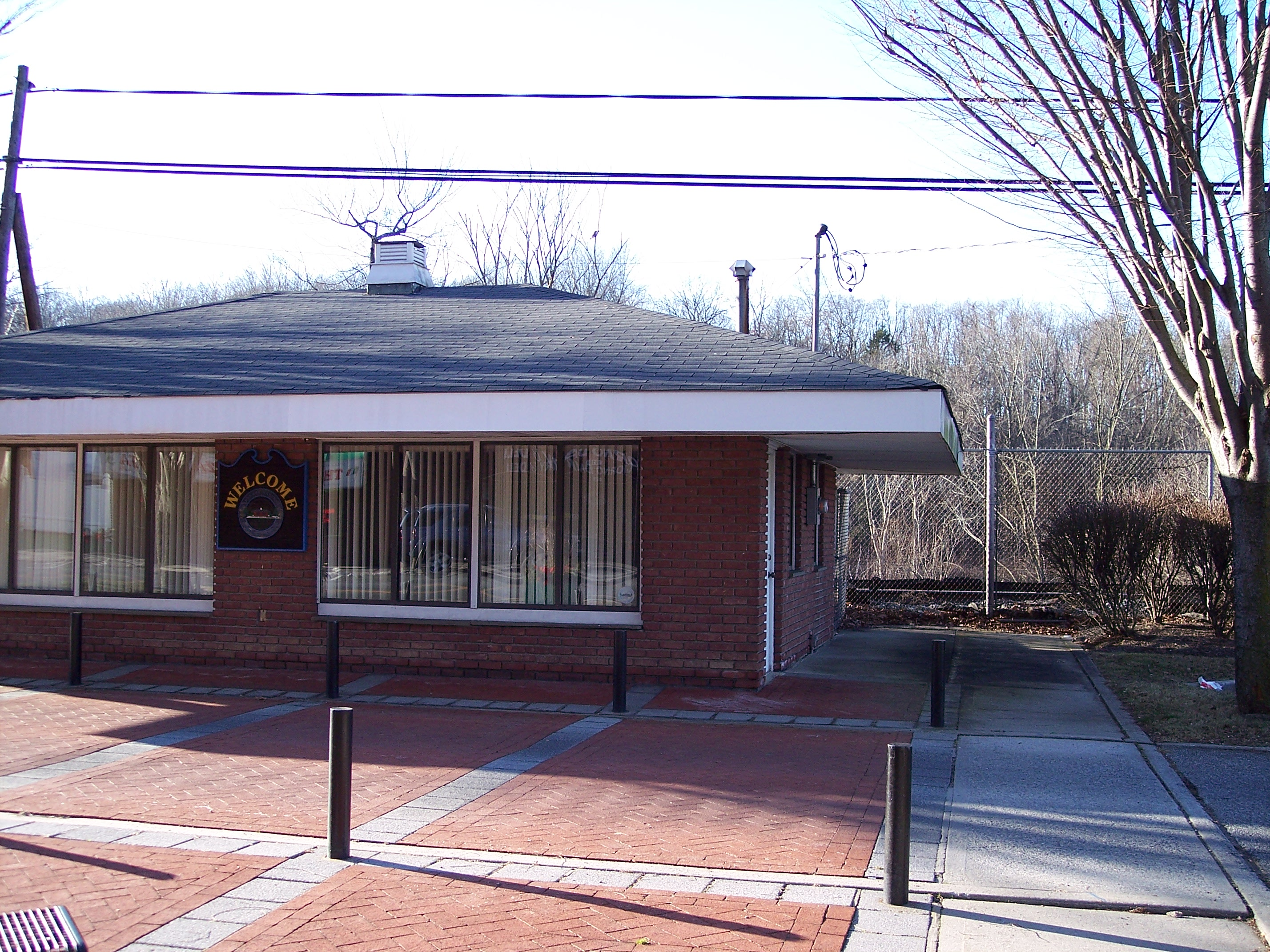

General information
- Location: Commerce Street and Franklin Avenue; Thornwood, New York
- Coordinates: 41.1211°N 73.7822°W
- Owner: Thornwood-Hawthorne Chamber of Commerce
- Line: Harlem Line
- Platforms: 1 side
- Tracks: 2

History
- Opened: c.1891
- Closed: March 5, 1984
- Former names: Sherman Park (c. 1891–1914)

Former services
Preceding station	Metro-North Railroad	Following station
Hawthorne toward Grand Central	Harlem Line	Pleasantville toward Wassaic
Preceding station	New York Central Railroad	Following station
Hawthorne toward New York	Harlem Division	Pleasantville toward Chatham
Location

Thornwood station was a stop on the Metro-North Railroad's Harlem Line, serving the hamlet of Mount Pleasant, New York until its closure in 1984. During its existence, the station was one of the least used on the Harlem Line. Prior to its closure, it had only half the weekday service of the neighboring Hawthorne and Pleasantville stations, and was merely a flag stop for four trains on weekends.

== History ==
The New York and Harlem Railroad laid tracks through what would later become the Village of Sherman Park during the 1840s. The community of Sherman Park was built around the tracks in 1891, and the New York Central and Hudson River Railroad station was soon established there. The village was dissolved in 1914 and renamed "Thornwood," and the station was renamed as such. Sometime during the late-1950s the former Richardson Romanesque depot was replaced with a simple brick structure.

As with most of the Harlem Line, the merger of New York Central with Pennsylvania Railroad in 1968 transformed the station into a Penn Central Railroad station. Penn Central's continuous financial despair throughout the 1970s forced them to turn over their commuter service to the Metropolitan Transportation Authority which made it part of Metro-North in 1983. When the Harlem Line was electrified between North White Plains and Brewster North in 1984, Thornwood was not upgraded due to sharp track curvature and low ridership precluding such upgrades, and as such was closed on March 4, 1984. At the time of closing, what few customers the station had were directed to use Pleasantville (1 mile north) as a replacement. The former station house, which is located where New York State Route 141 moves from Commerce Street to Franklin Avenue is now occupied by the Thornwood-Hawthorne Chamber of Commerce, which was established the year after the station was closed.
