= Westlake High School (New York) =

Location
- 825 Westlake Drive; Thornwood, New York 10594; United States; 41°6′39.9″N 73°46′0.2″W

Information
- Established: 1962
- School district: Mount Pleasant Central School District
- Principal: Keith Schenker
- Faculty: 55.20(on an FTE basis)
- Grades: 9–12
- Enrollment: 528 (2021–22)
- Student to teacher ratio: 9.57
- Colours: Columbia blue, navy blue and white
- Athletics conference: New York State Public High School Athletic Association, Section 1
- Team name: Wildcats
- Rivals: Pleasantville, Valhalla, Briarcliff
- Accreditation: Middle States Association of Colleges and Schools
- Yearbook: Pendulum

Westlake High School is located at 825 Westlake Drive in Thornwood, New York, United States. It serves the Mount Pleasant Central School District, including the hamlets of Hawthorne and Thornwood, and parts of the hamlet of Valhalla and the village of Pleasantville.

The campus of Westlake High School includes Westlake Middle School and the Mt. Pleasant Central School District's office.

== Athletics ==
=== Fall sports ===
- Varsity cheerleading
- Varsity cross country
- Varsity/junior varsity football
- Varsity/junior varsity boys' soccer
- Varsity/junior varsity girls' soccer
- Varsity girls' tennis
- Varsity/junior varsity girls' volleyball
- Varsity girls' swim and dive

=== Winter sports ===
- Varsity/junior varsity boys' basketball
- Varsity/junior varsity girls' basketball
- Varsity cheerleading
- Varsity boys' ice hockey
- Varsity girls' ice hockey
- Varsity indoor track and field
- Varsity boys' swim and dive
- Varsity boys' wrestling
- Varsity bowling

=== Spring sports ===
- Varsity/junior varsity baseball
- Varsity golf
- Varsity/junior varsity boys' lacrosse
- Varsity/junior varsity girls' lacrosse
- Varsity/junior varsity softball
- Varsity boys tennis
- Varsity track and field

== Notable alumni ==
- Rob Astorino (class of 1985) - Westchester County Executive, failed gubernatorial candidate, FBI corruption investigation subject, media personality, radio host, and program director for the Catholic Channel on SIRIUS Satellite Radio
- Ernie Sabella (class of 1968) - actor (Saved By The Bell, Seinfeld, Perfect Strangers); voice of Pumba in Disney's The Lion King
- Michael C. Williams (class of 1991) - actor (The Blair Witch Project)
