= MPCSD =

MPCSD may refer to:

- Menlo Park City School District - California
- Mount Pleasant Central School District - New York State
- Mount Pleasant Community School District - Iowa
