= New York State Route 141 =

State highway in Westchester County, New York, US

New York State Route 141
- Map of Westchester County in southeastern New York with NY 141 highlighted in red

Route information
- Maintained by NYSDOT
- Length: 3.49 mi (5.62 km)
- Existed: 1930–present

Major junctions
- South end: NY 9A / NY 100 in Hawthorne
- Taconic State Parkway in Hawthorne
- North end: NY 117 in Pleasantville

Location
- Country: United States
- State: New York
- Counties: Westchester

Highway system
- New York Highways; Interstate; US; State; Reference; Parkways
← NY 140	→ NY 142

New York State Route 141 (NY 141) is a north–south state highway in Westchester County, New York, in the United States. It extends for 3.49 miles (5.62 km) from an interchange with NY 9A in the hamlet of Hawthorne to an intersection with NY 117 in the village of Pleasantville. The route has a very short overlap with NY 100 west of Hawthorne and connects to the southbound direction of the Taconic State Parkway by way of a partial interchange in Hawthorne. Most of NY 141 is a two-lane road that serves residential and commercial areas; however, the southwesternmost 0.2 miles (0.3 km) is a four-lane divided highway.

NY 141 was established in the 1930 renumbering of state highways in New York, extending from Hawthorne to Pleasantville as it does today. At one time, the route extended as far south as the hamlet of Eastview 2.5 miles (4.02 km) southwest of Hawthorne.

== Route description ==
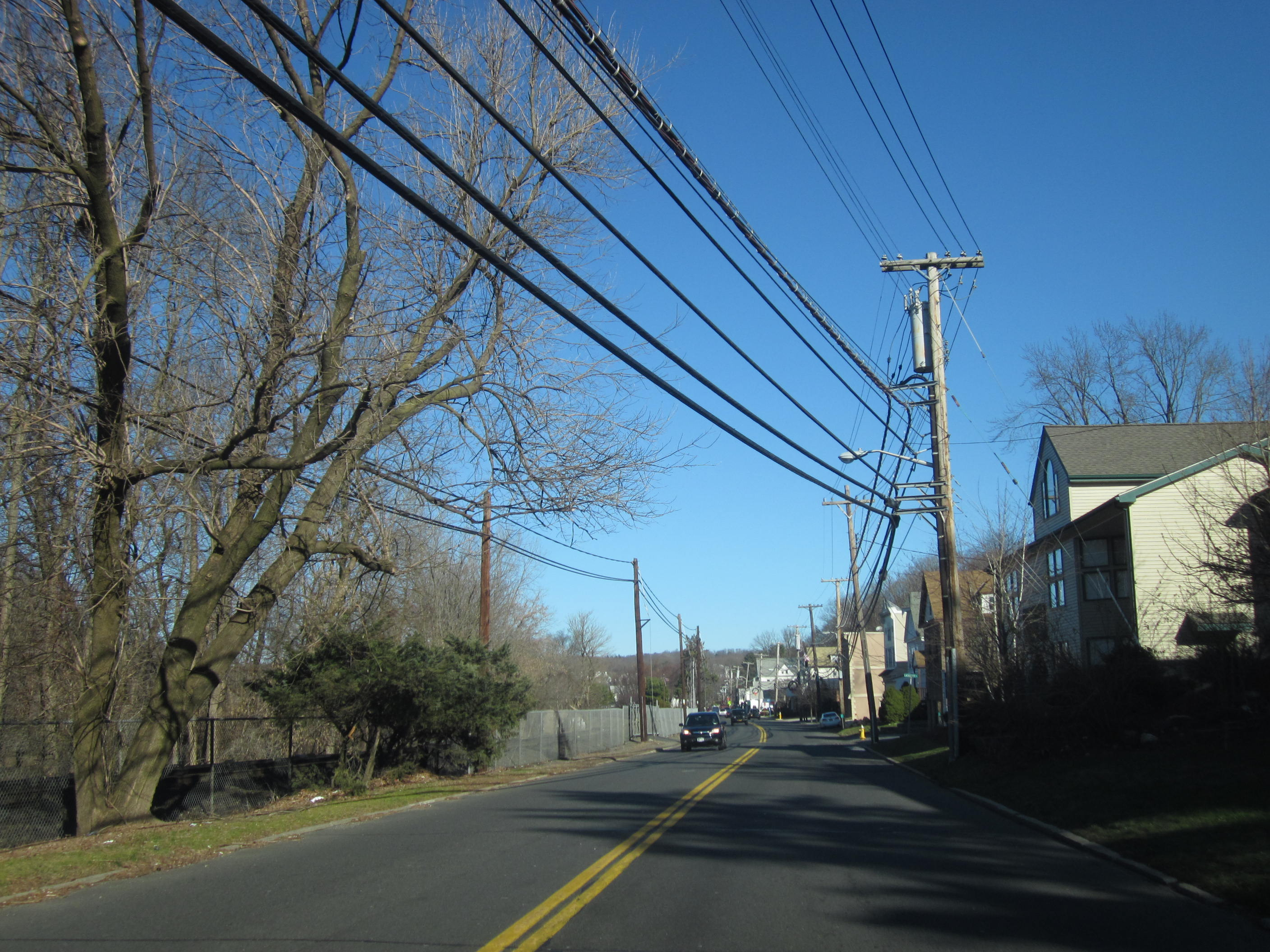
NY 141 northbound through the hamlet of Thornwood, alongside Metro-North's Harlem Line

NY 141 begins at a trumpet interchange with NY 9A on the western edge of the hamlet of Hawthorne, located within the town of Mount Pleasant. This junction also serves as the south end of NY 9A's overlaps with NY 100. NY 141 initially heads to the northeast as an independent route, following the two ramps not carrying either direction of NY 100. After just 0.1 miles (0.2 km), all four ramps merge into a four-lane divided highway, creating a short overlap between NY 141 and NY 100. The divided highway ends at Brighton Avenue, the first road that it intersects. NY 100 splits from NY 141 here, following Brighton Avenue southward while NY 141 heads southeastward along the two-lane Broadway, passing through a lightly developed commercial area. After one block, the route intersects Bradhurst Avenue, here a state-maintained street serving as a one-block spur of NY 100.

Just east of Bradhurst Avenue, NY 141 connects to the Taconic State Parkway by way of a partial interchange. The junction has only two connections; the first links NY 141 to the southbound parkway, while the second leads from the northbound direction of the parkway to NY 141 via West Cross Street. Continuing eastward, the highway passes under the parkway and enters the commercial center of Hawthorne. Here, NY 141 crosses over the Metro-North Railroad before turning northward onto Elwood Avenue. Over the next 1.5 miles (2.4 km), NY 141 closely parallels the railroad's Harlem Line, serving its Hawthorne station as the road heads north. After three blocks, the road and railroad turn to the northeast and begin to run alongside the Saw Mill River Parkway. Elwood Avenue ends shortly after the curve, giving way to Commerce Street.

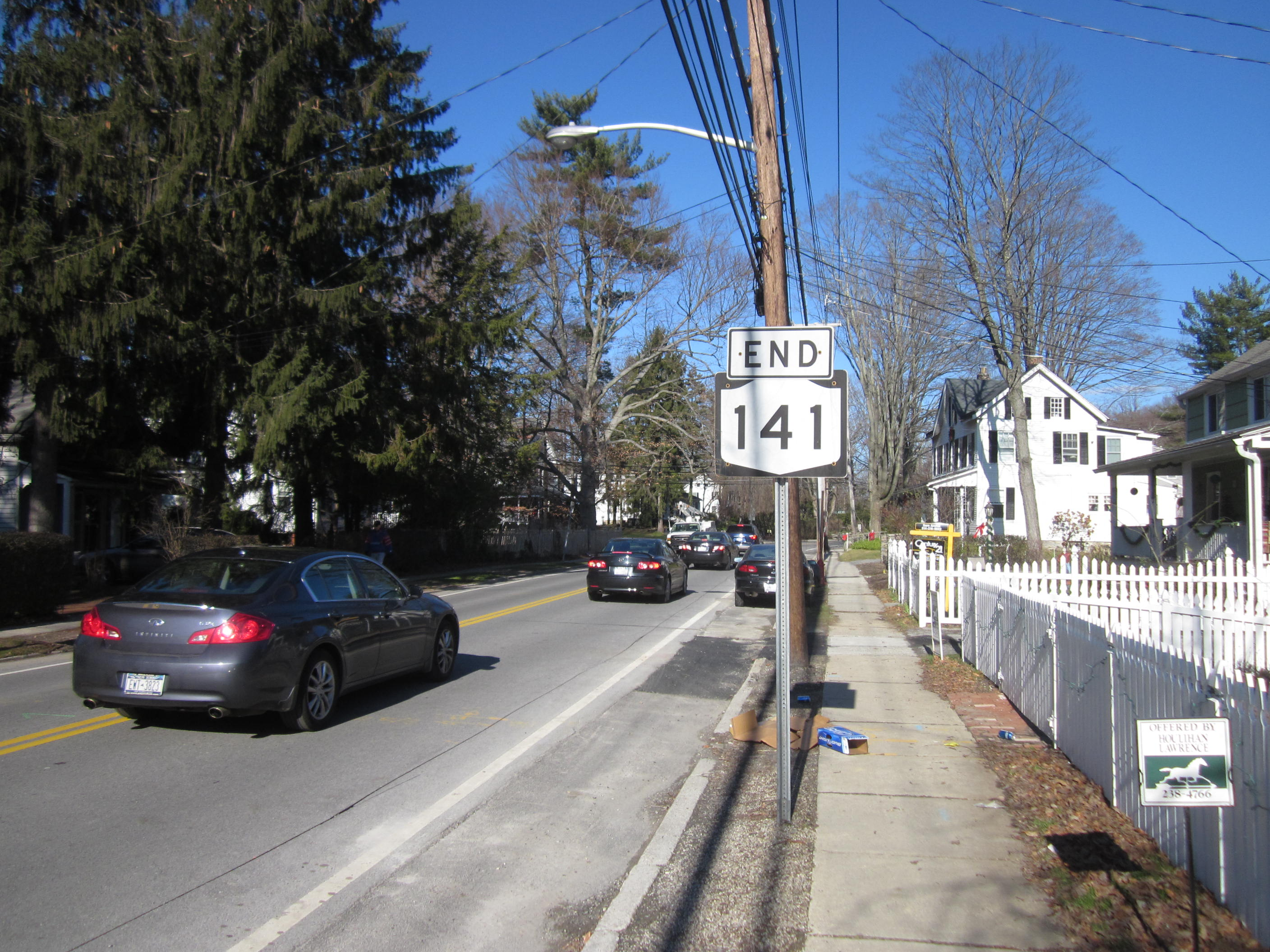
NY 141 approaching its northern terminus, NY 117 in the village of Pleasantville

As Commerce Street, NY 141 continues to head to the northeast, passing by a line of businesses in an otherwise residential area between the hamlets of Hawthorne and Thornwood. The route eventually enters the latter's central business district, where the Saw Mill Parkway and the Harlem Line turn northwestward toward the center of the nearby village of Pleasantville. NY 141 continues on a northern track however, veering off of Commerce Street onto Franklin Avenue, then becoming known as Broadway again as it heads through mostly residential areas on its way into the eastern portion of Pleasantville. It retains the Broadway name to a junction with Bedford Road, from where the route continues as Bedford Road for two blocks before ending at an intersection with NY 117. Southbound NY 117 enters from the west on Manville Road, while NY 117 north turns north to follow Bedford Road.

== History ==
The alignment of NY 141 between Fort Washington Avenue in Hawthorne and the Pleasantville village line was constructed up to state highway standards during the early 20th century. Designated State Highway 1308 (SH 1308), August 31, 1915, the State of New York let a contract to upgrade the 2.14 miles (3.44 km) alignment with new pavement. The alignment would have 16 feet (4.9 m) of pavement on 29 feet (8.8 m) of right-of-way. Construction was completed in 1918, and the state accepted the alignment into the state highway system on March 15.

NY 141 was established in the 1930 renumbering of state highways in New York. It originally followed Marble Avenue from Thornwood to Pleasantville; however, it was realigned in the 1940s to follow Broadway between Thornwood and NY 117, then routed on Bedford Road, in Pleasantville. In the late 1930s, NY 141 was extended southwestward to Eastview by way of modern NY 9A and the now-dismantled Old Saw Mill River Road. This change was reverted on January 1, 1949 when most of the highway became part of a realigned NY 9A. In Hawthorne, a grade crossing on Broadway with the New York Central Railroad Harlem Division existed just north of the railroad station at the intersection with Elwood Avenue until 1951, when the New York State Department of Public Works realigned the route away from Broadway onto a bridge over the tracks south of the station leading to a wye at Elmwood Avenue. On September 1, 1980, NY 141 was extended two blocks northward after NY 117 was rerouted to follow Manville Road through Pleasantville.

== Major intersections ==
The entire route is in Westchester County.

Location	mi	km	Destinations	Notes
Town of Mount Pleasant	0.00	0.00	NY 9A / NY 100 north – Elmsford, Briarcliff Manor	Trumpet interchange; southern terminus; southern end of NY 100 concurrency
Town of Mount Pleasant	0.22	0.35	NY 100 south to Sprain Brook Parkway south	Northern end of NY 100 concurrency; northbound exit and southbound entrance; hamlet of Hawthorne
Town of Mount Pleasant	0.35	0.56	To NY 100 south	No southbound entrance; access via Bradhurst Avenue
Town of Mount Pleasant			Taconic State Parkway south to Sprain Brook Parkway south	Exit 2 on Taconic State Parkway; hamlet of Hawthorne
Town of Mount Pleasant	2.10	3.38	To Saw Mill River Parkway	Access via Marble Avenue; hamlet of Thornwood
Pleasantville	3.49	5.62	NY 117	Northern terminus
1.000 mi = 1.609 km; 1.000 km = 0.621 mi: Concurrency terminus
