= Mount Pleasant Central School District =

School district in the U.S. state of New York

Mount Pleasant Central School District is a school district headquartered in Thornwood, New York.

It includes the census-designated places of Hawthorne and Thornwood, as well as a portion of the village of Pleasantville. The district is mostly in the Town of Mount Pleasant. The territory extends into the North Castle Town.

== History ==
Dr. Susan Guiney began working for the District in 2008 and became the first and only woman superintendent in the history of the District. In 2018, Dr. Guiney announced that she would retire.

Dr. Kurtis Kotes became superintendent in 2018. In 2021, Peter Giarrizzo became superintendent.

== Schools ==
Secondary

- Westlake High School
- Westlake Middle School

Elementary

- Columbus Elementary School
- Hawthorne Elementary School
