= Hawthorne station (Metro-North) =

Metro-North Railroad station in New York

Hawthorne
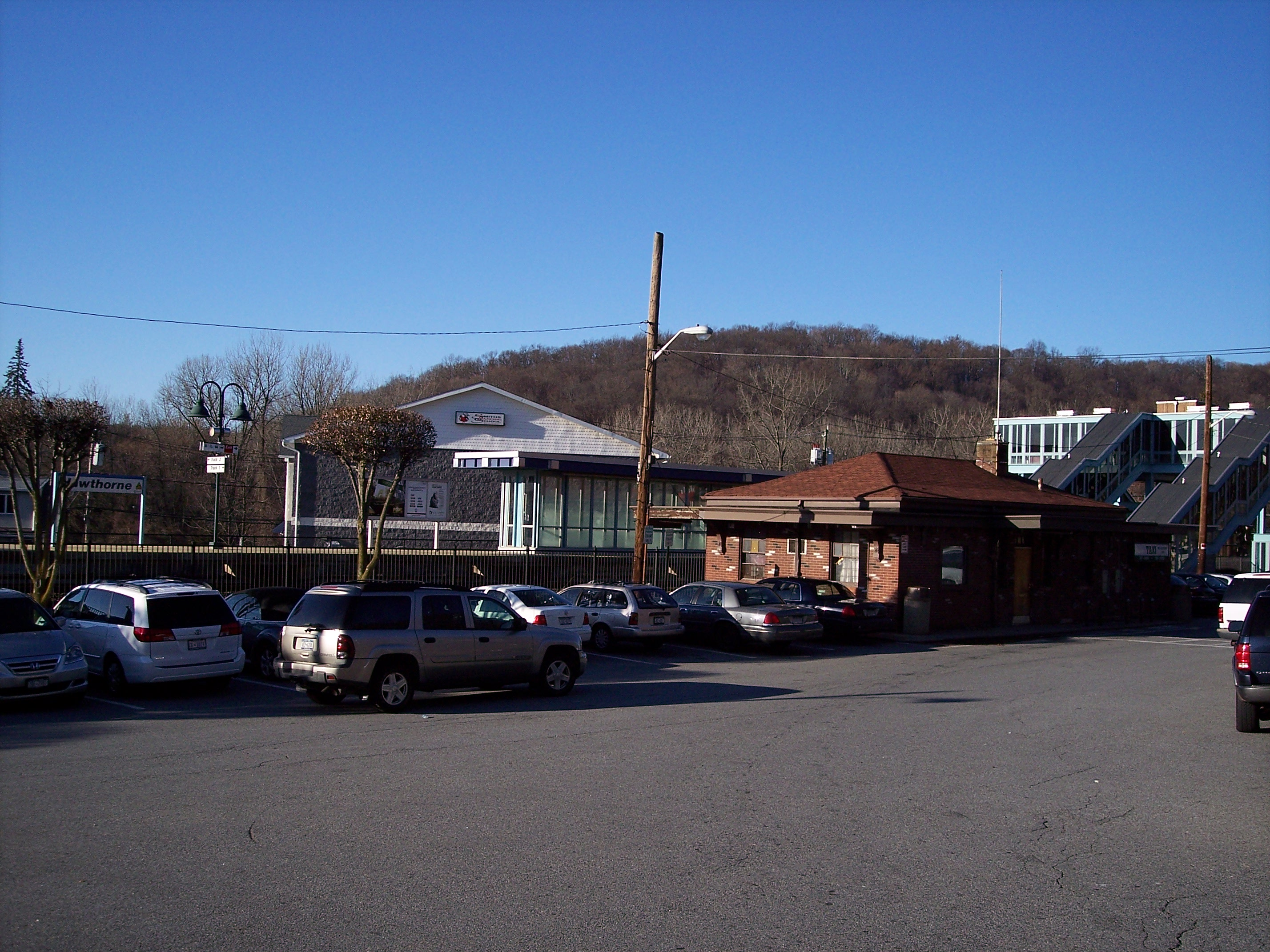

General information
- Location: 398 Elwood Avenue, Hawthorne, New York
- Coordinates: 41.1090°N 73.7960°W
- Line: Harlem Line
- Platforms: 1 island platform
- Tracks: 2
- Connections: Bee-Line Bus System: 15

Construction
- Parking: 308 spaces
- Accessible: yes

Other information
- Fare zone: 5

History
- Opened: 1847
- Electrified: 1984; 700V (DC) third rail
- Former names: Unionville (1847–1901)

Passengers
- 2018: 808 (Metro-North)
- Rank: 61 of 109

Services
Preceding station	Metro-North Railroad	Following station
Mount Pleasant toward Grand Central	Harlem Line limited service	Pleasantville toward Southeast
Valhalla toward Grand Central	Harlem Line	Pleasantville toward Southeast
Former services
Preceding station	Metro-North Railroad	Following station
Mount Pleasant toward Grand Central	Harlem Line	Thornwood closed 1984 toward Wassaic
Preceding station	New York Central Railroad	Following station
Mount Pleasant toward New York	Harlem Division	Thornwood toward Chatham
Location

Hawthorne station is a commuter rail stop on the Metro-North Railroad's Harlem Line, located in Mount Pleasant, New York.

== History ==
Rail service in Hawthorne can be traced as far back as 1847, when the New York and Harlem Railroad built a line and a railroad station with the name "Unionville", the former name of Hawthorne itself. The railroad and the station became part of the New York Central and Hudson River Railroad in 1864 and was eventually taken over by the New York Central Railroad. By the early 20th century, when Rose Hawthorne Lathrop established a home for victims of incurable cancer, the community and the station were renamed "Hawthorne". A grade crossing existed just north of the station for Broadway at Elwood Avenue until 1951, when the New York State Department of Public Works realigned New York State Route 141 onto a bridge over the tracks south of the station leading to a wye at Elwood Road. Sometime during the late-1950s the former Richardson Romanesque depot was replaced with a simple brick structure.

As with most of the Harlem Line, the merger of New York Central with Pennsylvania Railroad in 1968 transformed the station into a Penn Central Railroad station. Penn Central's continuous financial despair throughout the 1970s forced them to turn over their commuter service to the Metropolitan Transportation Authority, which made it part of Metro-North in 1983. At some point, the station was remodeled and moved about 100-foot (30 m) from its original location.

== Station layout ==
The station has one eight-car-long high-level island platform serving trains in both directions.
