= Runyon Heights, Yonkers =

Neighborhood in Yonkers, New York, US

Coordinates: 40°57′21″N 73°52′2″W

Runyon Heights, also known as the area of Nepperhan, is a historically African American middle-class neighborhood in northwestern Yonkers, New York, US.

Runyon Heights can be found along the north side of Tuckahoe Road between Saw Mill River Parkway and New York State Thruway. Noteworthy locations include Saint Mary's Cemetery and Kardash Park.

== History ==
Nepperhan, aka Runyon Heights was created as a small part of the Tenth Ward of the city of Yonkers. In those days Yonkers was divided into twelve wards. One of the common features of the Runyon Heights neighborhood is the frequency of dead-end streets, which separate the area from adjacent neighborhoods. Runyon Heights became one of the first predominantly black suburban areas, with few through streets into neighboring white neighborhoods - a feature designed in the years before World War 1. Barber shops and beauty salons doubled as meeting places for the politically active local community. Voters from Nepperhan were noted for crossing party lines when they cast their ballots. Their votes were driven by issues, making them influential in tight local elections. The political philosophy of the Runyon Heights community was that votes should go to candidates that did the most for them and not just voting uncritically for the Democratic Party.

== Politics ==
Black Americans mostly voted democrat after the New Deal and President Truman's Committee on Civil Rights. Runyon Heights is considered an anomaly. In 1930 77% of voters were Republicans; by 1940 they were losing ground to Democrats, but Republicans held the majority through the Eisenhower years, and into the mid-1960s. Runyon Heights voters may have been influenced by Reconstruction era loyalties to the Republican Party. They also leaned socially conservative like many other typical suburbs. The residents described themselves as "Eisenhower Republicans".
