= Thornwood, New York =

- CDP
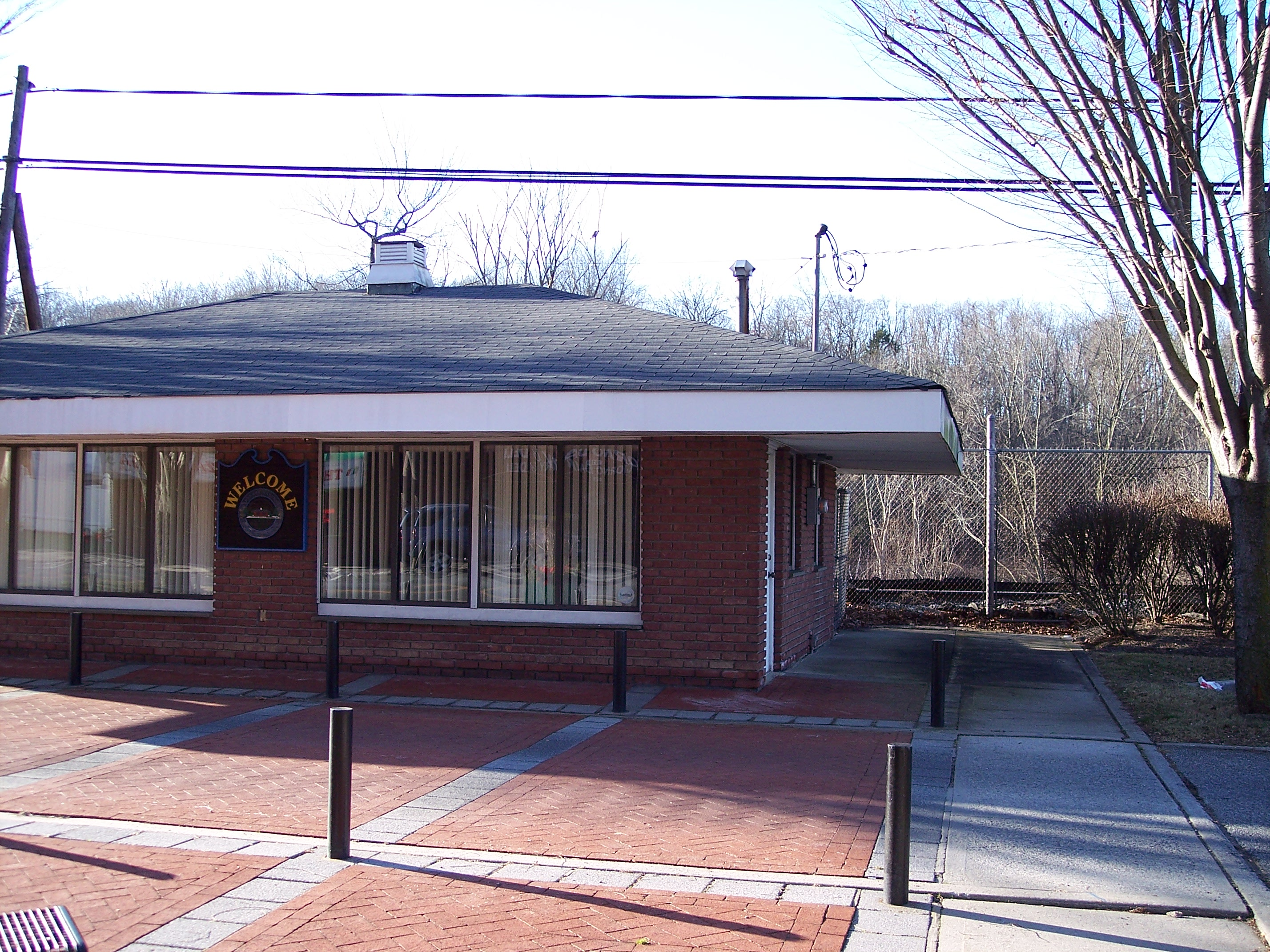
- Thornwood-Hawthorne Chamber of Commerce building

- Location of Thornwood in Westchester County, New York
- Coordinates: 41°7′18″N 73°46′37″W
- Country: United States
- State: New York
- County: Westchester
- Town: Mount Pleasant

Area
  - Total: 1.12 sq mi (2.89 km^{2})
  - Land: 1.12 sq mi (2.89 km^{2})
  - Water: 0 sq mi (0.00 km^{2})
- Elevation: 269 ft (82 m)

Population (2020)
  - Total: 3,960
  - Density: 3,545.7/sq mi (1,368.99/km^{2})
- Time zone: UTC-5 (Eastern (EST))
  - Summer (DST): UTC-4 (EDT)
- ZIP Code: 10594
- Area code: 914
- FIPS code: 36-73715
- GNIS feature ID: 0967439

Thornwood is a hamlet (unincorporated community), census-designated place (CDP), and postal designation (with zip code 10594) in the town of Mount Pleasant in Westchester County, New York, United States. As of the 2020 census, Thornwood had a population of 3,960.

== History ==
In 1891, Lewis Smadback started a very successful development at what is now Thornwood. The village of Sherman Park was incorporated in 1906 and the name was changed to Hillside in 1909. The village was dissolved in 1914, when Thornwood took its current name and became a hamlet within the Town of Mount Pleasant. It is possible that Thornwood is a derivative of "Hawthorne's Woods," since Hawthorne is an adjacent hamlet. Another possibility is Thornwood is named after an area in Glasgow, Scotland.

Thornwood once had a large and thriving Westchester marble quarry near its heart, the intersection of Route 141 and Kensico Road (known as Four Corners). Dating back to 1845, the quarry supplied white marble which helped build St. Patrick's Cathedral (hence the name of Marble Avenue which runs through the hamlet). The quarry pit was filled in during the mid-1980s, and the Town Center shopping mall was constructed over it.

Thornwood once had a station on the Harlem Line of the Metro-North Railroad and was approximately a 48-minute ride to Grand Central Terminal. The station building remains on Commerce Street, but the stop was eliminated when the up-starter Harlem Line (north of North White Plains) was electrified in the mid-1980s. Thornwood was the only stop eliminated as a result of the electrification process. While the station could accommodate diesel trains, the curvature of the tracks as proceeding north to Pleasantville made the construction at Thornwood of an elevated platform, necessary for electric trains, impractical.

The death of baby Kristie Fischer took place in 1991.

== Geography ==
Thornwood is located at 41°7′18″N 73°46′37″W (41.121557, -73.777071). According to the U.S. Census Bureau, the hamlet has a total area of 1.1 square miles (2.9 km^{2}), all land.

== Demographics ==
Historical population
| Census | Pop. | Note | %± |
|---|---|---|---|
| 2020 | 3,960 | | — |
U.S. Decennial Census

=== 2020 census ===
As of the 2020 census, Thornwood had a population of 3,960. The median age was 42.3 years. 21.8% of residents were under the age of 18 and 17.1% of residents were 65 years of age or older. For every 100 females there were 100.9 males, and for every 100 females age 18 and over there were 98.3 males age 18 and over.

100.0% of residents lived in urban areas, while 0.0% lived in rural areas.

There were 1,354 households in Thornwood, of which 35.9% had children under the age of 18 living in them. Of all households, 62.9% were married-couple households, 16.2% were households with a male householder and no spouse or partner present, and 16.9% were households with a female householder and no spouse or partner present. About 18.5% of all households were made up of individuals and 7.0% had someone living alone who was 65 years of age or older.

There were 1,402 housing units, of which 3.4% were vacant. The homeowner vacancy rate was 0.7% and the rental vacancy rate was 0.9%.

Racial composition as of the 2020 census
| Race | Number | Percent |
|---|---|---|
| White | 3,134 | 79.1% |
| Black or African American | 40 | 1.0% |
| American Indian and Alaska Native | 12 | 0.3% |
| Asian | 190 | 4.8% |
| Native Hawaiian and Other Pacific Islander | 0 | 0.0% |
| Some other race | 254 | 6.4% |
| Two or more races | 330 | 8.3% |
| Hispanic or Latino (of any race) | 582 | 14.7% |

=== 2000 census ===
As of the census of 2000, there were 5,980 people, 1,886 households, and 1,559 families residing in the hamlet. The population density was 1,760.9 inhabitants per square mile (679.9/km^{2}). There were 1,921 housing units at an average density of 565.7 per square mile (218.4/km^{2}). The racial makeup of the hamlet was 90.97% White, 2.36% African American, 0.03% Native American, 4.00% Asian, 0.07% Pacific Islander, 1.39% from other races, and 1.19% from two or more races. Hispanic or Latino of any race were 5.80% of the population.

There were 1,886 households, out of which 40.7% had children under the age of 18 living with them, 72.5% were married couples living together, 7.2% had a female householder with no husband present, and 17.3% were non-families. 14.8% of all households were made up of individuals, and 6.9% had someone living alone who was 65 years of age or older. The average household size was 3.06 and the average family size was 3.39.

The population age distribution is 28.3% under the age of 18, 6.3% from 18 to 24, 28.3% from 25 to 44, 23.9% from 45 to 64, and 13.3% who were 65 years of age or older. The median age was 38 years. For every 100 females, there were 97.8 males. For every 100 females age 18 and over, there were 95.7 males.

The median income for a household in the hamlet was $88,971, and the median income for a family was $98,313. Males had a median income of $73,438 versus $40,365 for females. The per capita income for the hamlet was $36,254. About 2.2% of families and 4.0% of the population were below the poverty line, including 2.6% of those under age 18 and 3.9% of those age 65 or over.

== Economy ==
Thornwood is the home to the North American headquarters for the Carl Zeiss Corporation, a multinational German manufacturer of optical systems, industrial measurements and medical devices.

== Religious institutes ==
The Legion of Christ, a Roman Catholic religious institute, operates the Our Lady of Thornwood Conference, Education and Training Center on the site of a former IBM facility on Columbus Avenue. The seminarians studying here for the Catholic priesthood usually major in philosophy at the Thornwood Conference Center. However, due to a lack of vocations and private funds—partly due to the abuse scandal caused by the order's founder, Father Marcial Maciel Degollado, which resulted in a Vatican investigation and revision—the entire course of Seminary studies will now be taken at the Legionaries' Seminary in Rome, Italy and the building will be sold.

== Emergency services ==
Thornwood's residents are served by the Mt. Pleasant Police Department and the volunteer Thornwood Fire Department. The fire department serves approximately 5,000 residents in a 5-square-mile (13 km^{2}) suburban area. Its equipment includes:

- Engine 88 - 2010 Sutphen Monarch pumper(supply & mutual aid engine)
- Engine 89 - 2017 Sutphen Monarch pumper (initial attack engine)
- Rescue 75 - 2005 Pierce Dash (rescue pumper)
- Tower Ladder 1 - 1998 Sutphen 95' ladder
- Utility 55 - 2020 Chevrolet Silverado 2500 HD
- Mini Attack 19 - Polaris Utility Body 6x6
- 2471, 2472, 2473 - Chief cars
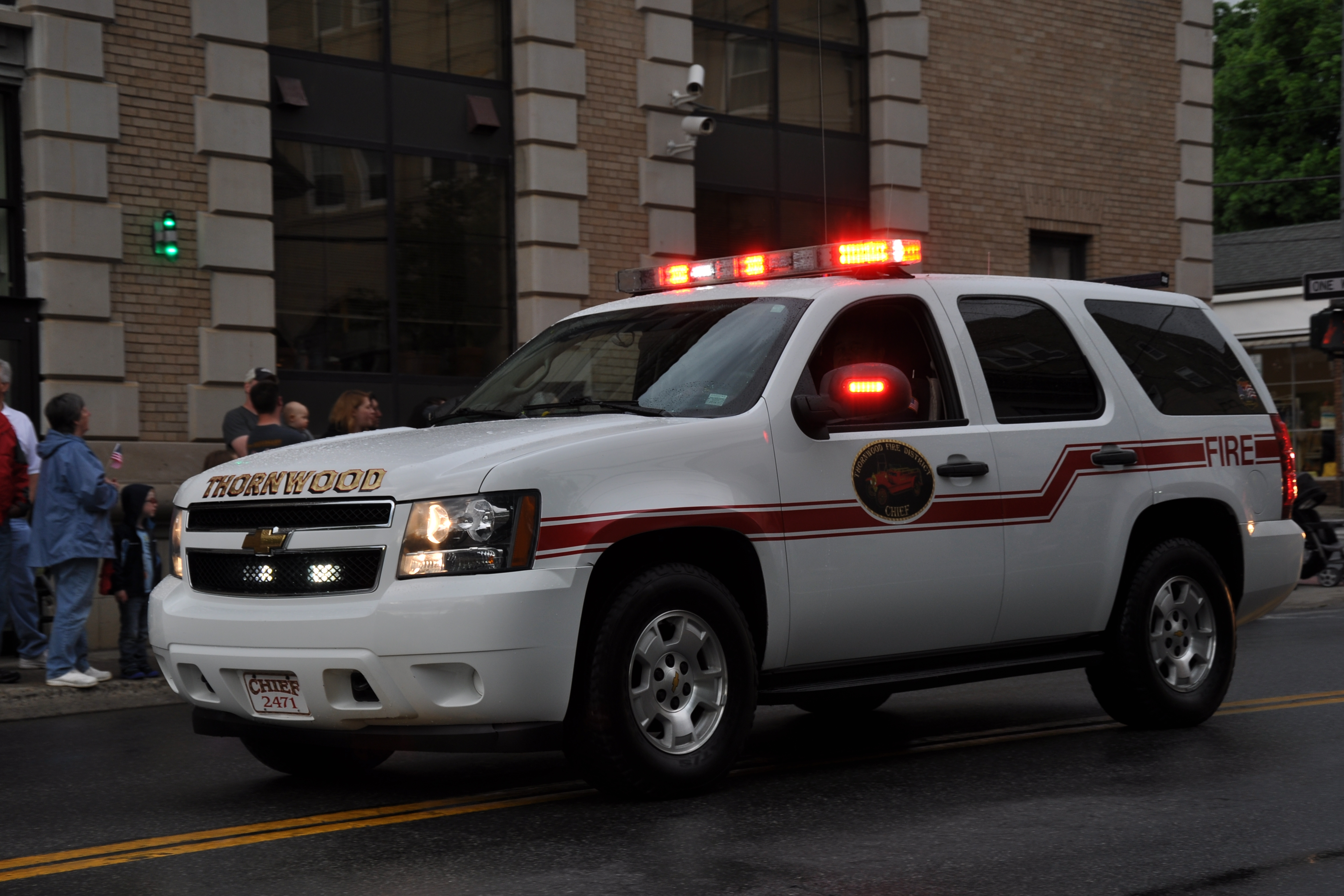
Car 2471

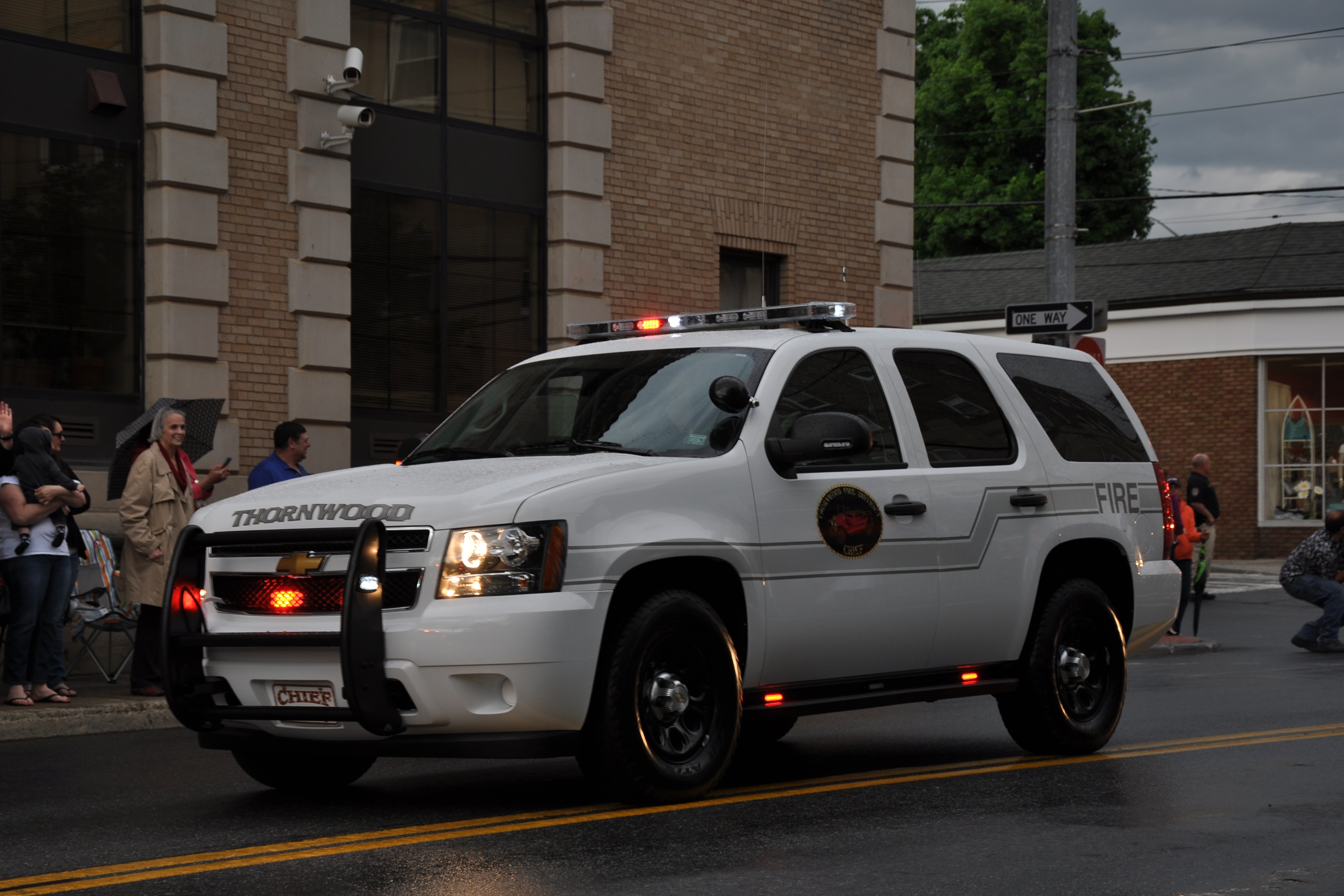
Car 2472

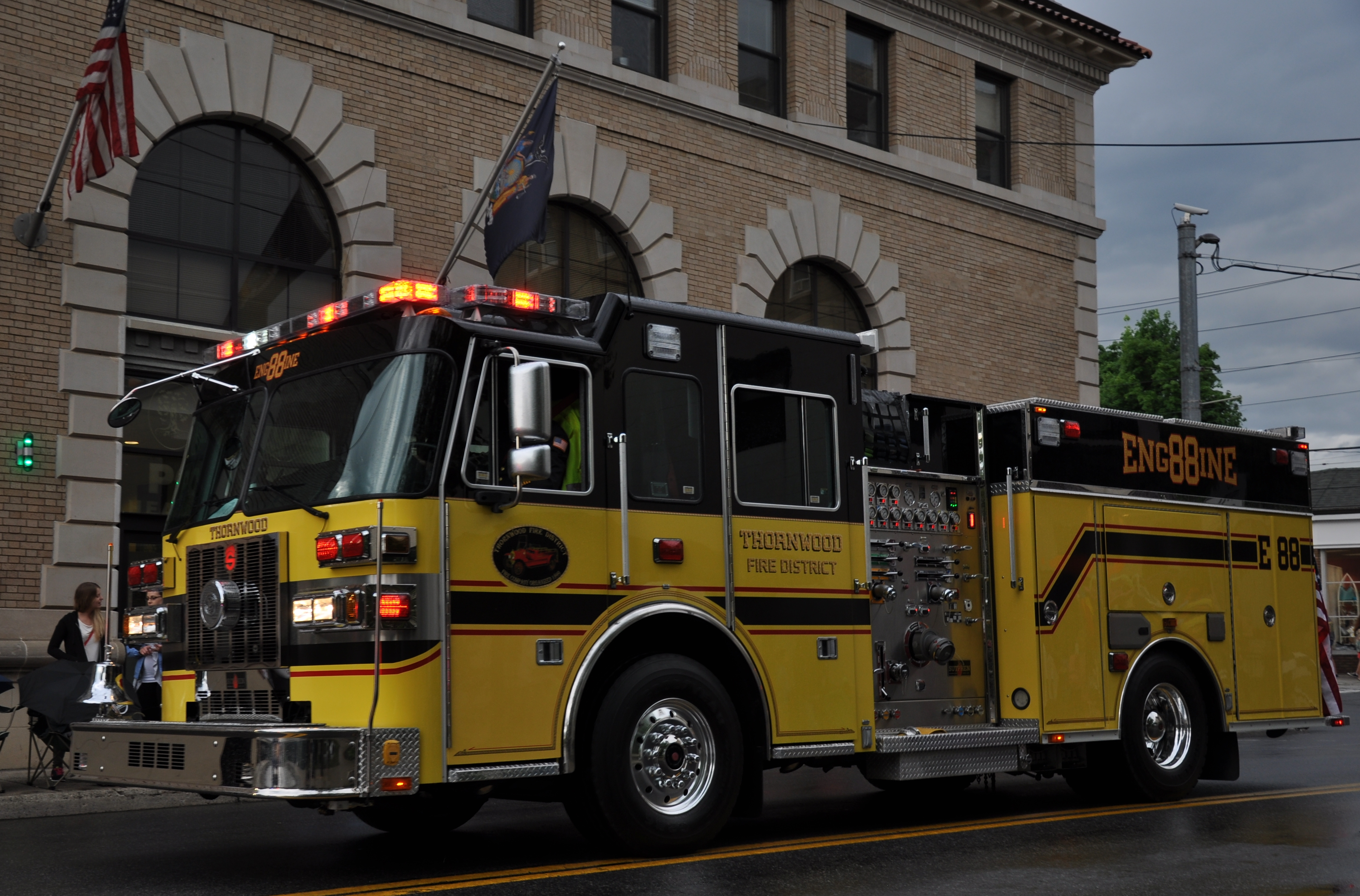
Engine 88

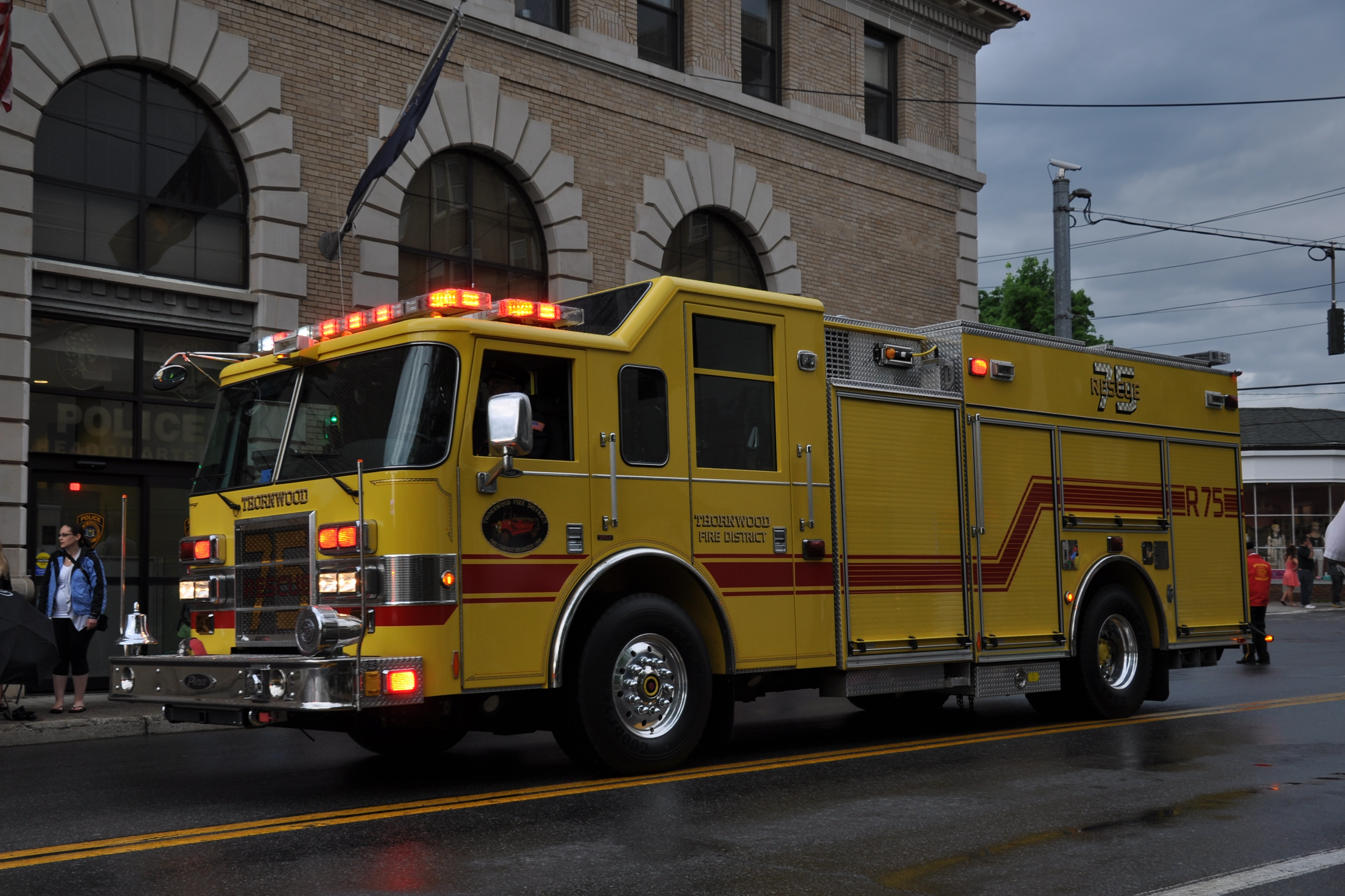
Rescue 75

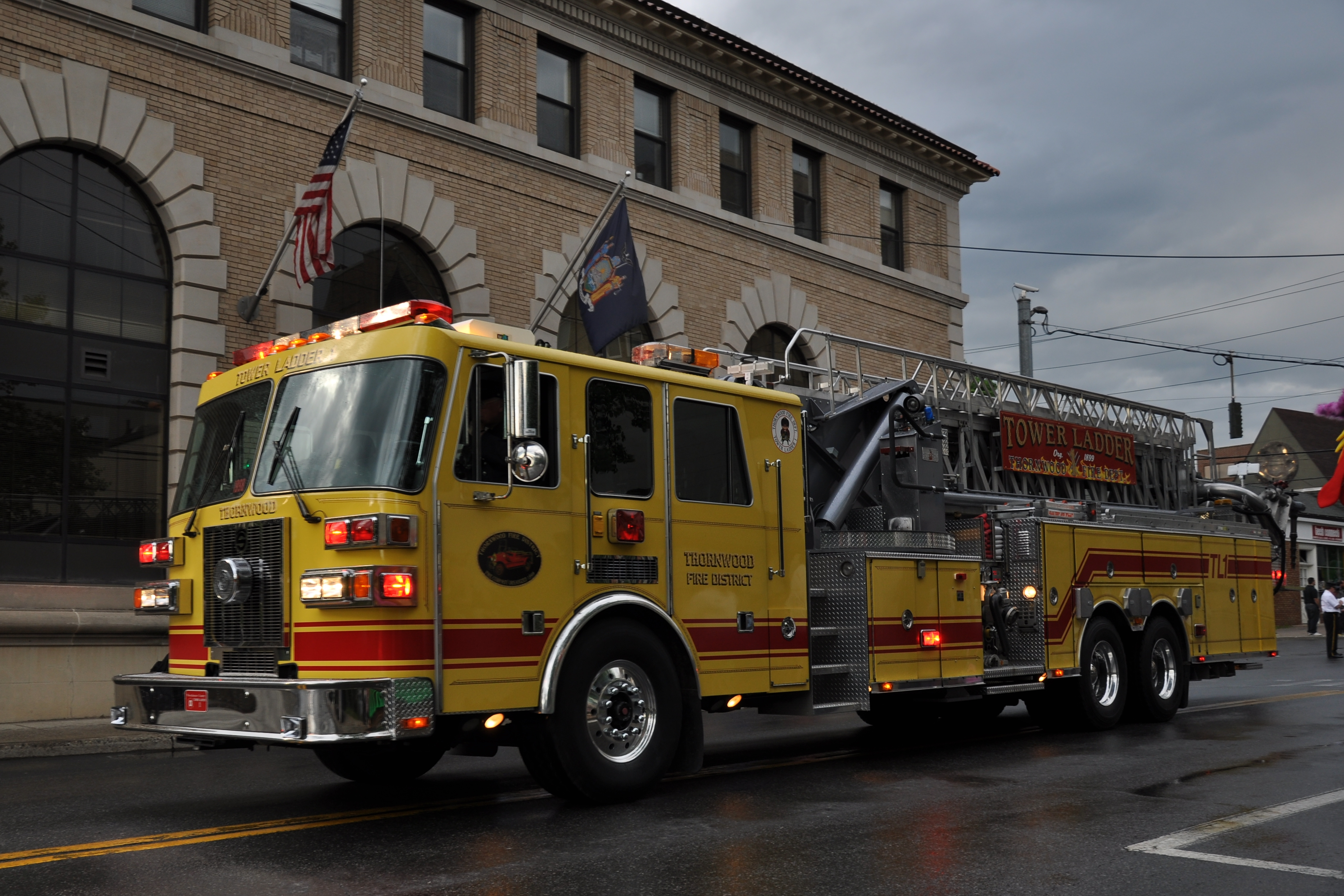
Tower Ladder 1

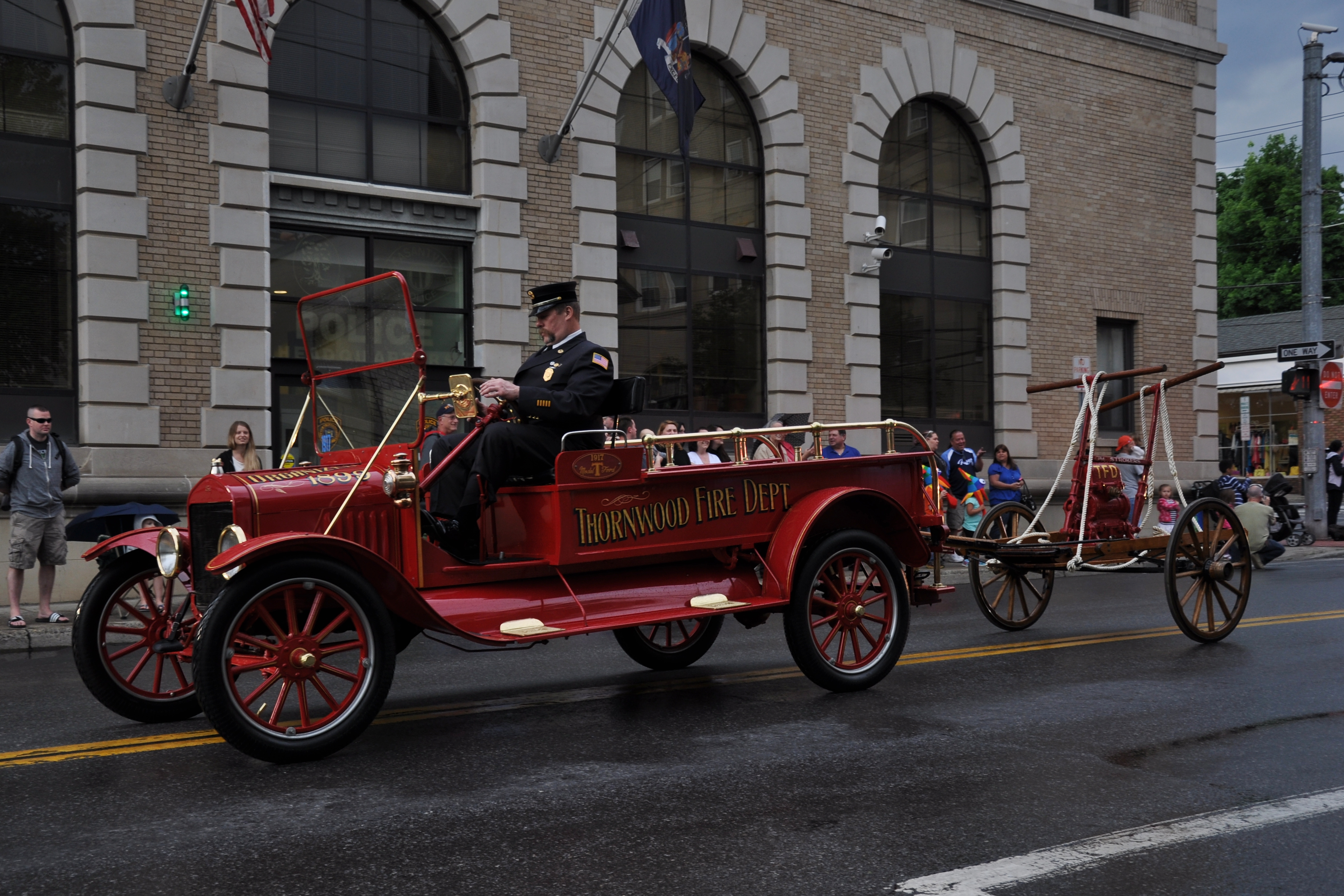
1917 Ford Model T, department antique

Thornwood is under the jurisdiction of Pleasantville Volunteer Ambulance Corps. The Pleasantville VAC fleet consists of 7601, 7602, 7603, Rehab 7605, and Captains Car 7611. They are located at 30 Gramercy Place in Thornwood across from the town center.

== Education ==
Thornwood is part of the Mount Pleasant Central School District, which includes Hawthorne Elementary, Columbus Elementary School, Westlake Middle School and Westlake High School. The former Thornwood Elementary School was closed and converted to condominiums in the 1980s, and the former Thornwood Junior High School later became Columbus Elementary School.

== Notable people ==
- Rob Astorino, politician and former Westchester County Executive
- Jack Beer, soccer player
- Carmen Carrozza, accordionist
- Susan Dey, actress and advocate
