= Hawthorne, New York =

- Census-designated place
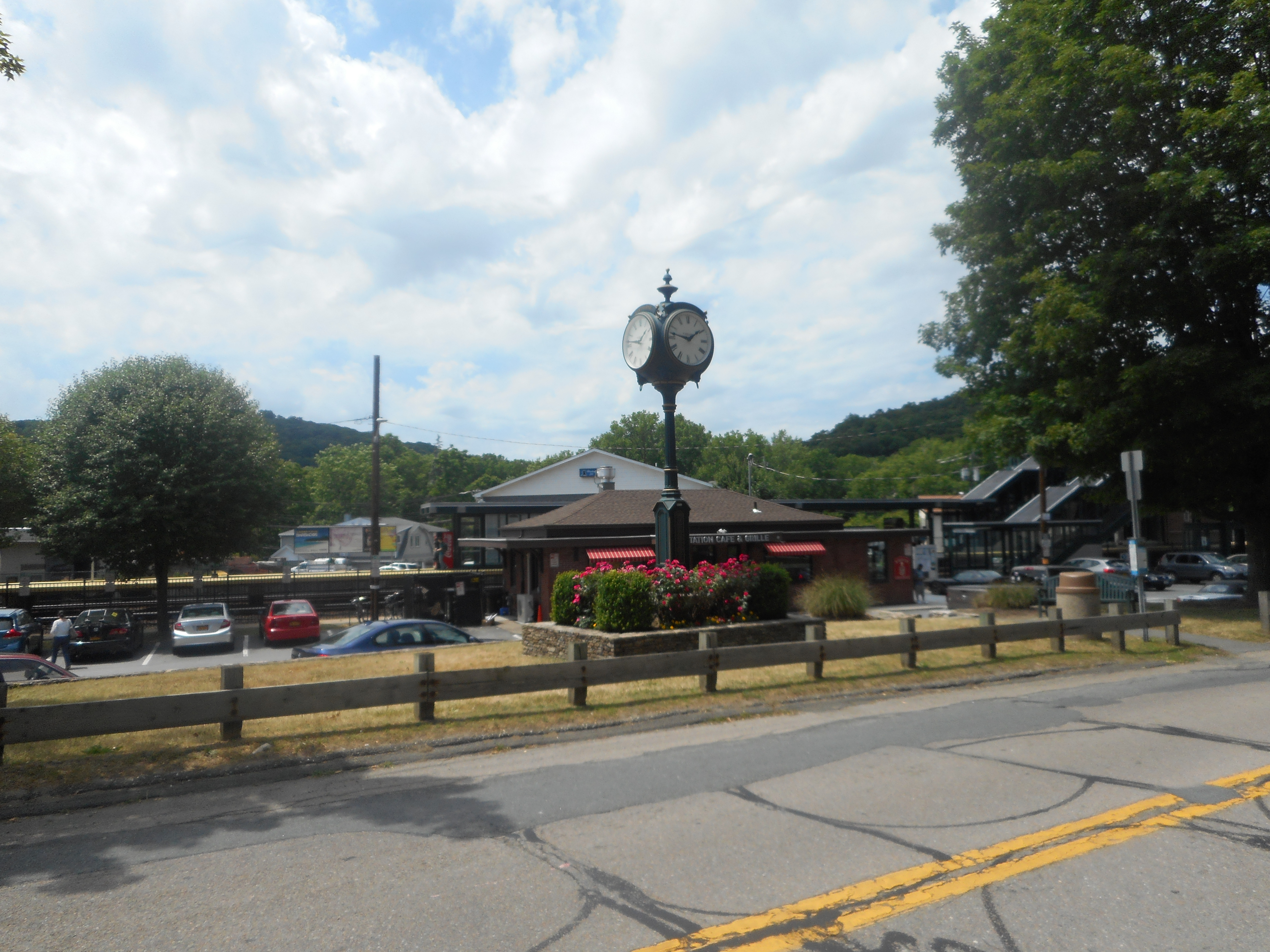
- Hawthorne Metro-North station, June 2016

- Location of Hawthorne, New York
- Coordinates: 41°6′13″N 73°47′45″W
- Country: United States
- State: New York
- County: Westchester
- Town: Mount Pleasant

Area
  - Total: 1.10 sq mi (2.84 km^{2})
  - Land: 1.10 sq mi (2.84 km^{2})
  - Water: 0 sq mi (0.00 km^{2})
- Elevation: 282 ft (86 m)

Population (2020)
  - Total: 4,646
  - Density: 4,229.6/sq mi (1,633.07/km^{2})
- Time zone: UTC-5 (Eastern (EST))
  - Summer (DST): UTC-4 (EDT)
- ZIP code: 10532
- Area code: 914
- FIPS code: 36-32842
- GNIS feature ID: 0952426

Hawthorne is a hamlet and census-designated place (CDP) located in the town of Mount Pleasant in Westchester County, New York, United States. It is part of the New York metropolitan area. As of the 2020 census, Hawthorne had a population of 4,646.

== History ==
The village was originally known as Hammond's Mills, and was part of Frederick Philipse's estate Philipsburgh. On September 23, 1780, Major John André stopped here on his way to New York to ask directions after meeting with Benedict Arnold.

After the Revolutionary War, the name of the village changed to Unionville. The hamlet's population consisted mostly of farmers. The Reformed Church of Unionville (Hawthorne Reformed Church) was built here in 1818. In 1832, a one-room school house was built. In 1847, a railroad station was established on New York Central's Harlem Division, with the name Unionville. A post office was established on February 10, 1851, and was designated Neperan after the Indian name for the Saw Mill River.

In the early 1890s, real-estate developer Louis Smadbeck began buying up the area farms to subdivide into parcels, which were sold to working- and middle-class people looking to live outside the city.

In 1901, Rose Hawthorne Lathrop, also known as Mother Mary Alphonsa, O.P., a convert to Catholicism and daughter of Nathaniel Hawthorne, founded Rosary Hill Home in Sherman Park (now Thornwood) for those suffering from incurable cancer. Mother Mary Alphonsa also founded a Dominican Order now known as the Dominican Sisters of Hawthorne. Shortly after the opening of the cancer home, the hamlet was renamed Hawthorne in Mother Mary Alphonsa's honor. Rosary Hill Home is still operated by the Dominican Sisters of Hawthorne and is located on a hilltop on Linda Avenue.

Hawthorne is the final resting place of Babe Ruth, James Cagney, Billy Martin, Malachi Martin, Dorothy Kilgallen, Ernesto Lecuona and many other notables interred at Gate of Heaven Cemetery.

The Hammond House was listed on the National Register of Historic Places in 1980.

On July 12, 2006, an F2 tornado struck the hamlet, causing major damage to the California Closets Warehouse and minor injuries to three people. It was the strongest tornado to strike in Westchester County.

== Geography ==
Hawthorne is located at 41°6′13″N 73°47′45″W (41.103664, -73.795807).

According to the United States Census Bureau, the CDP has a total area of 1.1 square miles (2.8 km^{2}), all land.

Bounded by Route 9A to the west, the Taconic State Parkway to the east, and split in the middle by the Sprain Brook Parkway, Hawthorne lies near the geographic center of Westchester County.

Corporate parks and nurseries line Hawthorne's Route 9A corridor. Commerce Street (Route 141), the main commercial thoroughfare serving both Hawthorne and Thornwood, runs north to south, parallel to Metro-North's Harlem Line tracks. It is a 40-minute train ride from the Hawthorne station to Grand Central Terminal.

== Education ==
Hawthorne's residents are served by the Mount Pleasant Central School District, which includes Hawthorne Elementary School, Columbus Elementary School, Westlake Middle School and Westlake High School (the latter three actually located in Thornwood).

The Jewish Board of Family and Children's Services (formerly "Jewish Board of Guardians") runs two residential schools in Hawthorne, the Hawthorne Cedar Knolls School and the Linden Hill High School; both of these schools are on Linda Avenue. Hawthorne Country Day School is located near the Valhalla border.

Hawthorne Cedar Knolls School with less than thirty students eligible to play varsity sports (football, basketball and baseball) boasted numerous championship teams in the varsity sports during the sixties and seventies (playing in a small school league named the Tri-State league, NY, NJ, and Conn.). HCKS went undefeated in all three varsity sports and winning the championships in 1972–1973 and again in 1974–1975.

== Emergency services ==
Hawthorne's residents are served by the Mount Pleasant Police Department, the Hawthorne Volunteer Fire Department, and the Mount Pleasant 37 Medic.

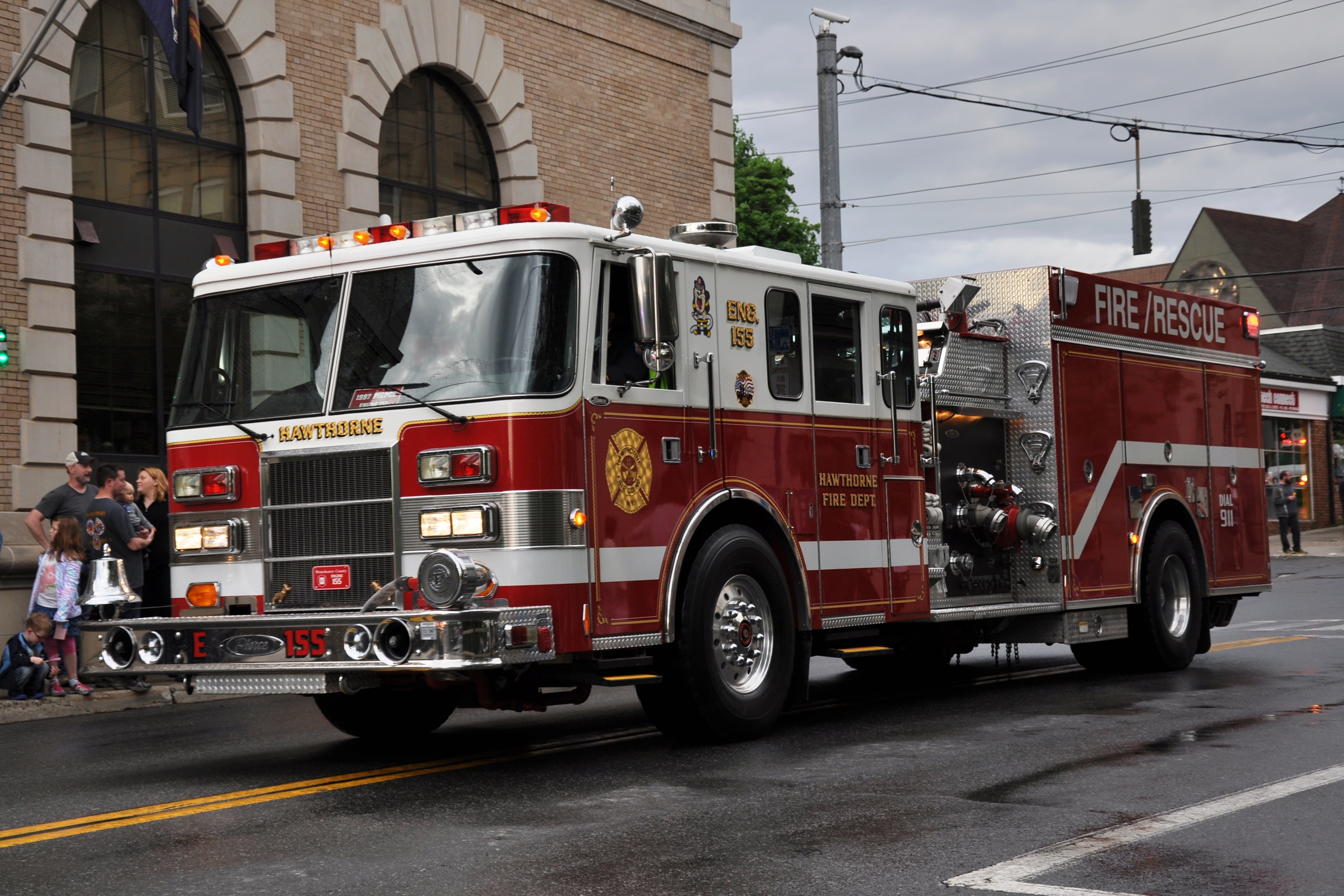
Fire Department Engine 155, a 1997 Pierce Lance 1500/750

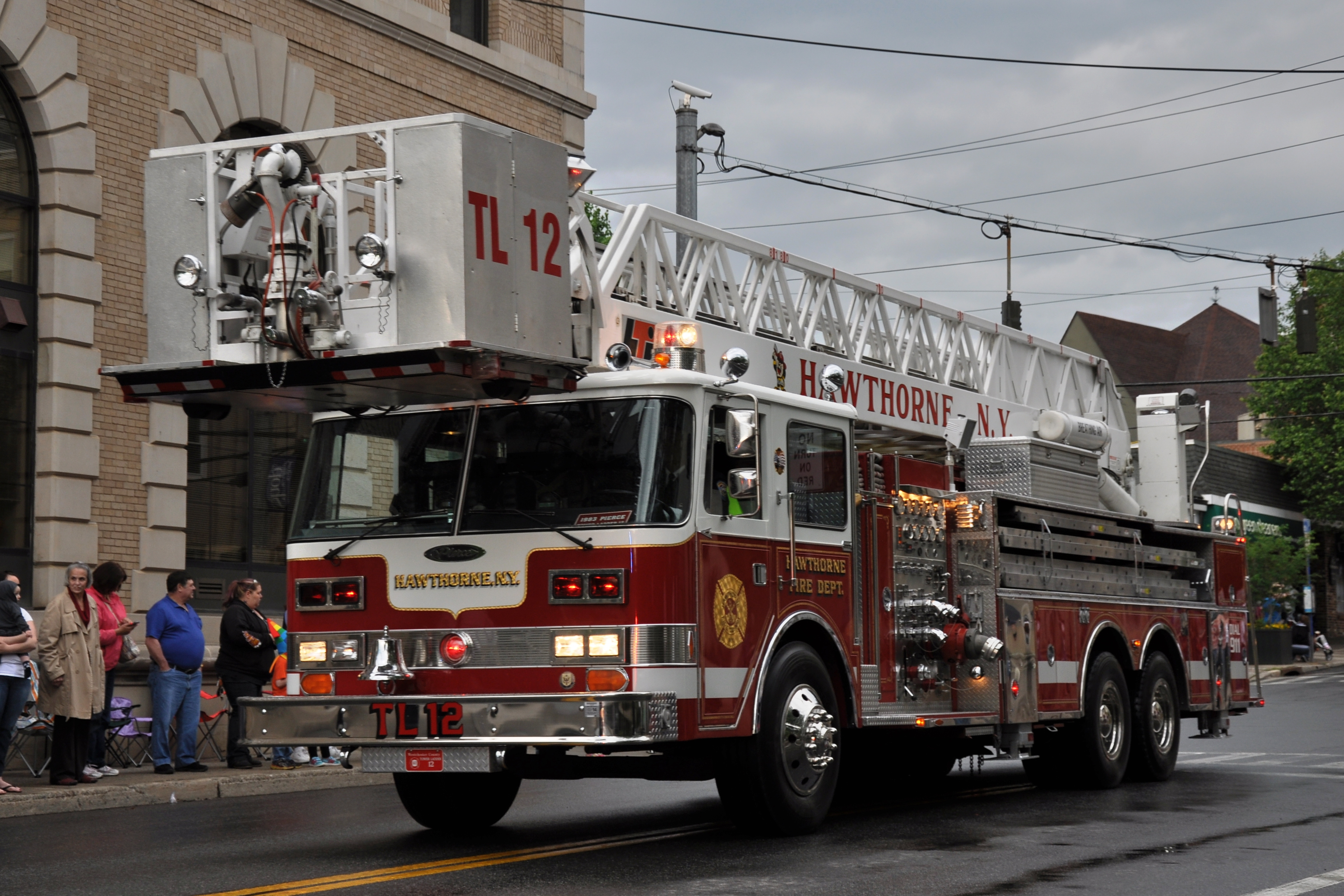
Fire Department Tower Ladder 12, a 1983 Pierce Arrow/LTI 1500/150/85 ft.

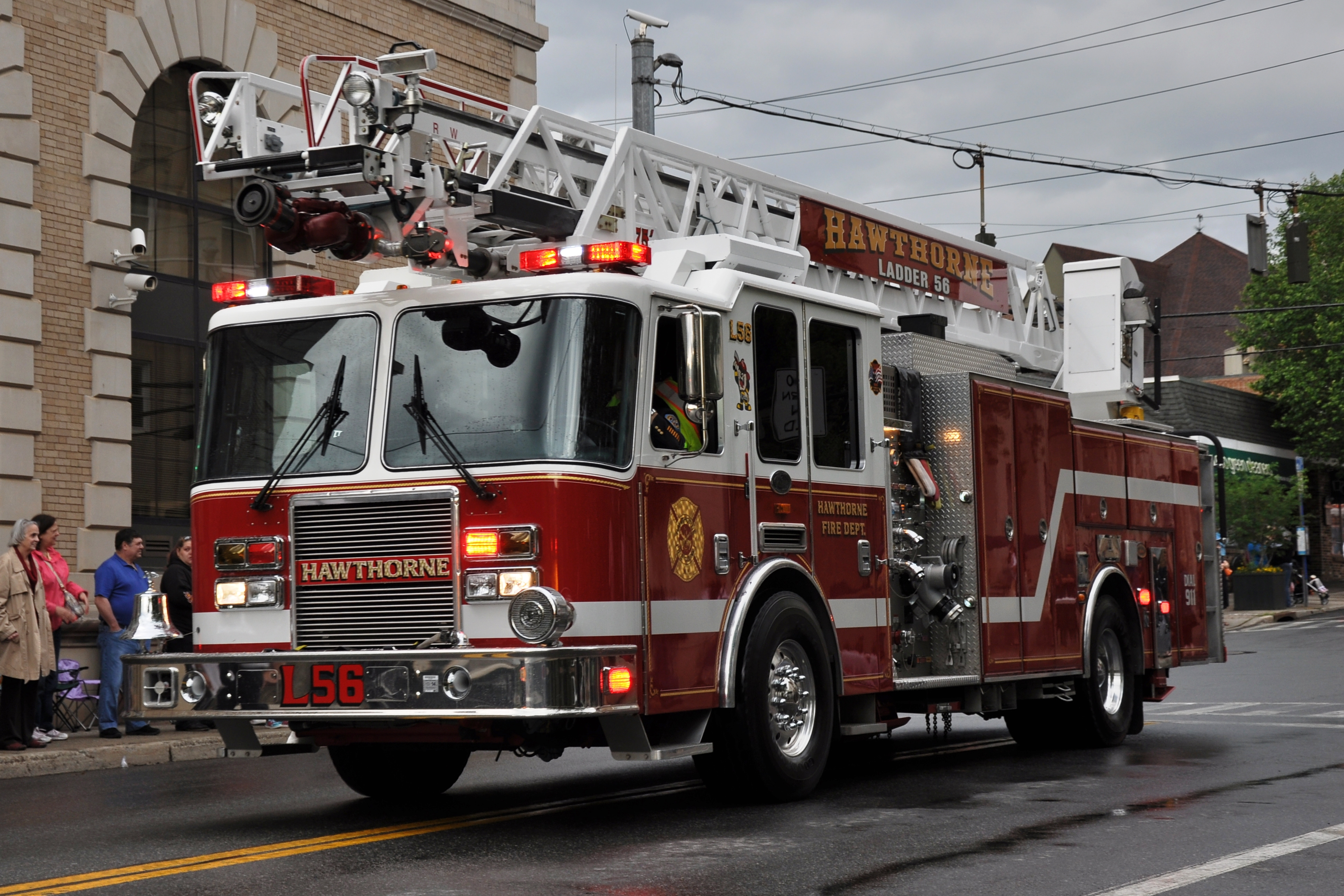
Fire Department Ladder 56, a 2008 KME Predator 2000/5000/75 ft.

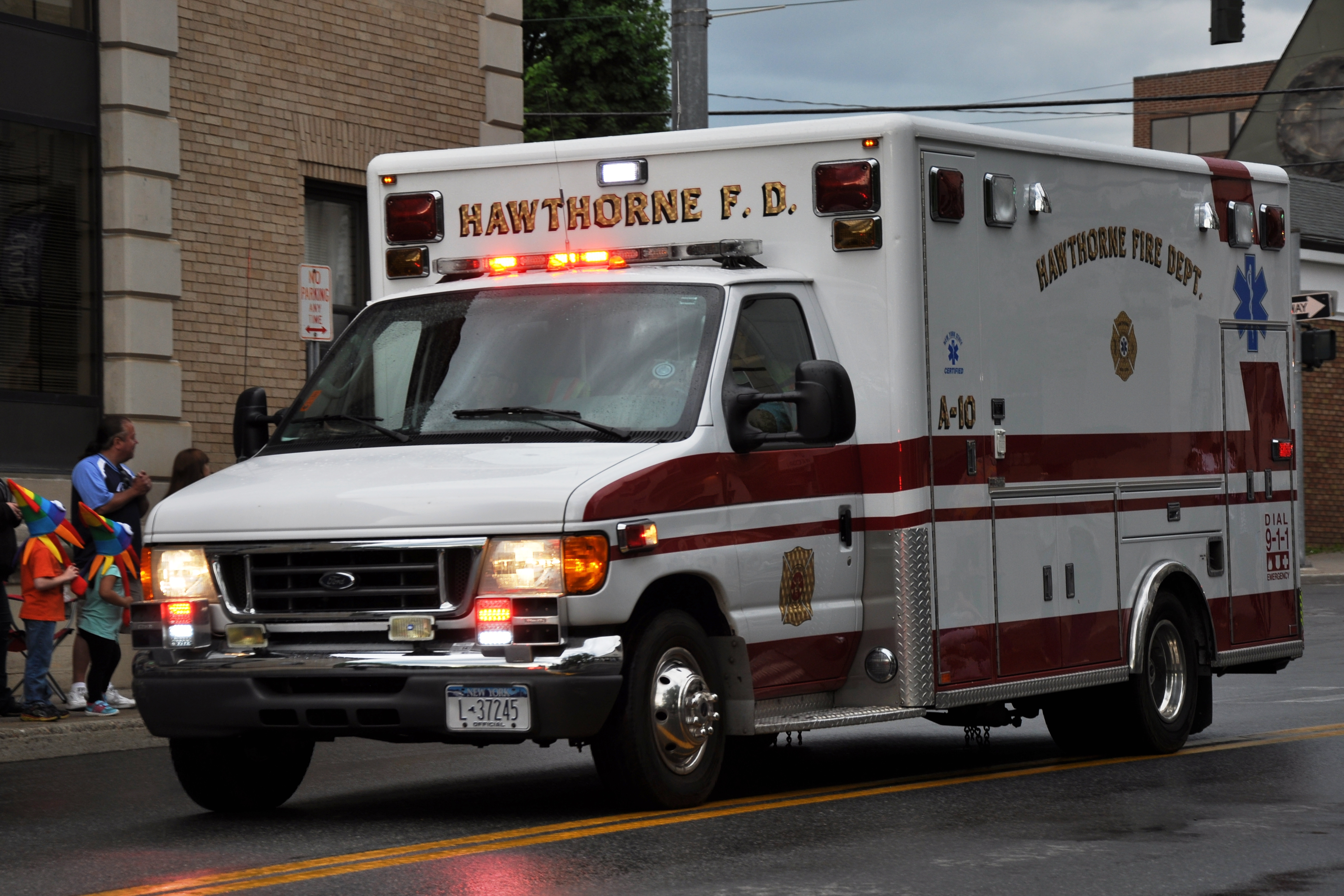
Fire Department Ambulance 63-B-1, a 2004 Ford/Brawn

== Demographics ==
Historical population
Census	Pop.	Note	%±
2020	4,646		—
U.S. Decennial Census

=== 2020 census ===
As of the 2020 census, Hawthorne had a population of 4,646. The median age was 44.7 years. 21.0% of residents were under the age of 18 and 20.1% of residents were 65 years of age or older. For every 100 females there were 96.3 males, and for every 100 females age 18 and over there were 92.7 males age 18 and over.

100.0% of residents lived in urban areas, while 0.0% lived in rural areas.

There were 1,610 households in Hawthorne, of which 34.4% had children under the age of 18 living in them. Of all households, 65.2% were married-couple households, 12.9% were households with a male householder and no spouse or partner present, and 18.2% were households with a female householder and no spouse or partner present. About 18.4% of all households were made up of individuals and 11.2% had someone living alone who was 65 years of age or older.

There were 1,669 housing units, of which 3.5% were vacant. The homeowner vacancy rate was 0.9% and the rental vacancy rate was 6.9%.

Racial composition as of the 2020 census
Race	Number	Percent
White	3,969	85.4%
Black or African American	44	0.9%
American Indian and Alaska Native	0	0.0%
Asian	187	4.0%
Native Hawaiian and Other Pacific Islander	1	0.0%
Some other race	193	4.2%
Two or more races	252	5.4%
Hispanic or Latino (of any race)	488	10.5%

=== 2000 census ===
As of the census of 2000, there were 5,083 people, 1,581 households, and 1,258 families residing in the hamlet. The population density was 3,006.0 inhabitants per square mile (1,160.6/km^{2}). There were 1,590 housing units at an average density of 940.3 per square mile (363.1/km^{2}). The racial makeup of the hamlet was 87.13% White, 4.34% African American, 0.02% Native American, 1.48% Asian, 0.04% Pacific Islander, 1.16% from other races, and 0.83% from two or more races. Hispanic or Latino of any race were 11.02% of the population.

There were 1,581 households, out of which 35.0% had children under the age of 18 living with them, 69.1% were married couples living together, 7.7% had a female householder with no husband present, and 20.4% were non-families. 16.7% of all households were made up of individuals, and 7.2% had someone living alone who was 65 years of age or older. The average household size was 2.97 and the average family size was 3.36.

In the hamlet the population was spread out, with 26.9% under the age of 18, 6.3% from 18 to 24, 28.1% from 25 to 44, 24.8% from 45 to 64, and 14.0% who were 65 years of age or older. The median age was 38 years. For every 100 females, there were 99.5 males. For every 100 females age 18 and over, there were 90.7 males.

The median income for a household in the hamlet was $71,370, and the median income for a family was $82,042. Males had a median income of $52,477 versus $39,142 for females. The per capita income for the hamlet was $28,664. About 1.4% of families and 3.3% of the population were below the poverty line, including 3.3% of those under age 18 and 1.3% of those age 65 or over.

== Sources ==
- Etzler, Kay (September 4, 1971). "1835 newcomer to Hawthorne found city unfit for children". Patent Trader. Mount Kisco: Patent Press. p. 4. ISSN 0746-1836. OCLC 9833221.
- Horne, Philip Field (1971). Mount Pleasant: The History of a New York Suburb and Its People. Hawthorne: privately printed. OCLC 886644296.
