= Pleasantville station =

Metro-North Railroad station in New York

Pleasantville
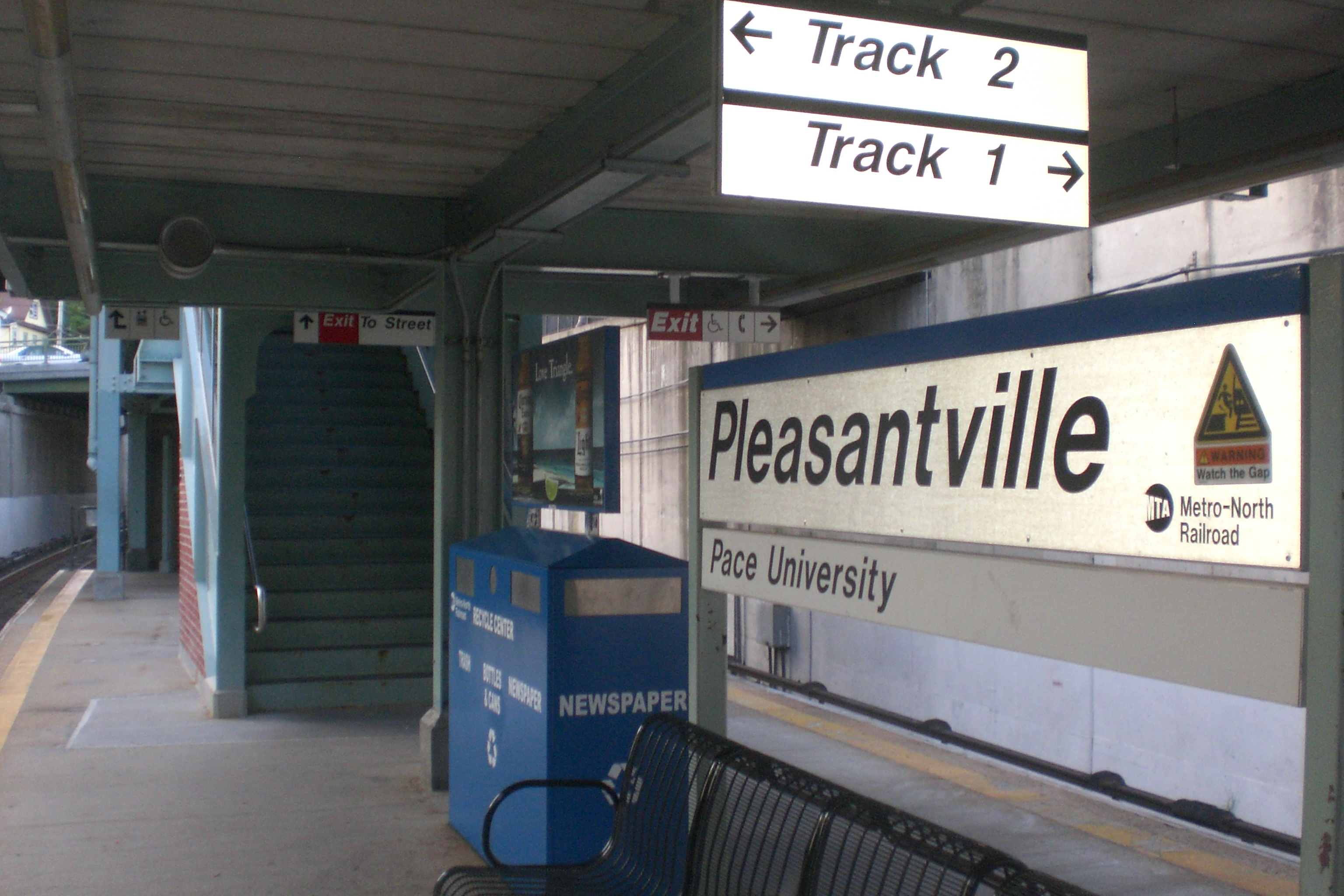

General information
- Location: 400 Manville Road, Pleasantville, New York
- Coordinates: 41.1348°N 73.7923°W
- Line: Harlem Line
- Platforms: 1 island platform
- Tracks: 2
- Connections: Bee-Line: 6, 15, 19

Construction
- Parking: 263 spaces
- Accessible: yes

Other information
- Fare zone: 5

History
- Opened: October 1846
- Rebuilt: 1905, 1959
- Electrified: 1984; 700V (DC) third rail

Passengers
- 2018: 1,348 (Metro-North)
- Rank: 46 of 109

Services
Preceding station	Metro-North Railroad	Following station
Hawthorne toward Grand Central	Harlem Line	Chappaqua toward Southeast
Former services
Preceding station	Metro-North Railroad	Following station
Thornwood closed 1984 toward Grand Central	Harlem Line	Chappaqua toward Wassaic
Preceding station	New York Central Railroad	Following station
Thornwood toward New York	Harlem Division	Chappaqua toward Chatham
Location

Pleasantville station is a commuter rail stop on the Metro-North Railroad's Harlem Line, located in Pleasantville, New York. There is also bus service to the station from Pace University.

== History ==
The New York and Harlem Railroad laid tracks through Pleasantville during the 1840s. Evidence of the existence of Pleasantville station can be found as far back as October 1846. The existing station house was built by the New York Central and Hudson River Railroad in 1905. The station also had freight sidings for the shipping department of the headquarters of Reader's Digest. On December 20, 1956, New York State opened up bids for the elimination of several grade crossings in Pleasantville, though the project was originally planned by New York Central 25 years earlier. The project was expected to cost $3.857 million. The tracks were lowered for 7,000 feet (2,100 m), new bridges were built over the railroad for Manville and Bedford Roads (current and former NY 117 respectively), and the station house was moved. The project was finished by 1959.

As with most of the Harlem Line, the merger of New York Central with Pennsylvania Railroad in 1968 transformed the station into a Penn Central Railroad station. Penn Central's continuous financial despair throughout the 1970s forced them to turn over their commuter service to the Metropolitan Transportation Authority which made it part of Metro-North in 1983. When the Harlem Line was electrified between North White Plains and Brewster North in 1984, less reconstruction was required at Pleasantville than with other stations.

== Present Day ==
Pleasantville is still a functioning station on the Harlem Line. The area is home to bus stops of multiple routes. Along with this, there are two manual ticket counters located on the platform and there is no customer service at this location. There are multiple entrances to the platforms including elevators. With the station being 31 miles north of Manhattan, it is about a 50-minute trip from Grand Central Terminal to Pleasantville.

== Station layout ==
The station has one six-car-long high-level island platform serving trains in both directions.

== Bibliography ==
- Hyatt, Elijah Clarence (1898). History of the New York & Harlem Railroad.
