= Mount Pleasant, New York =

- Town
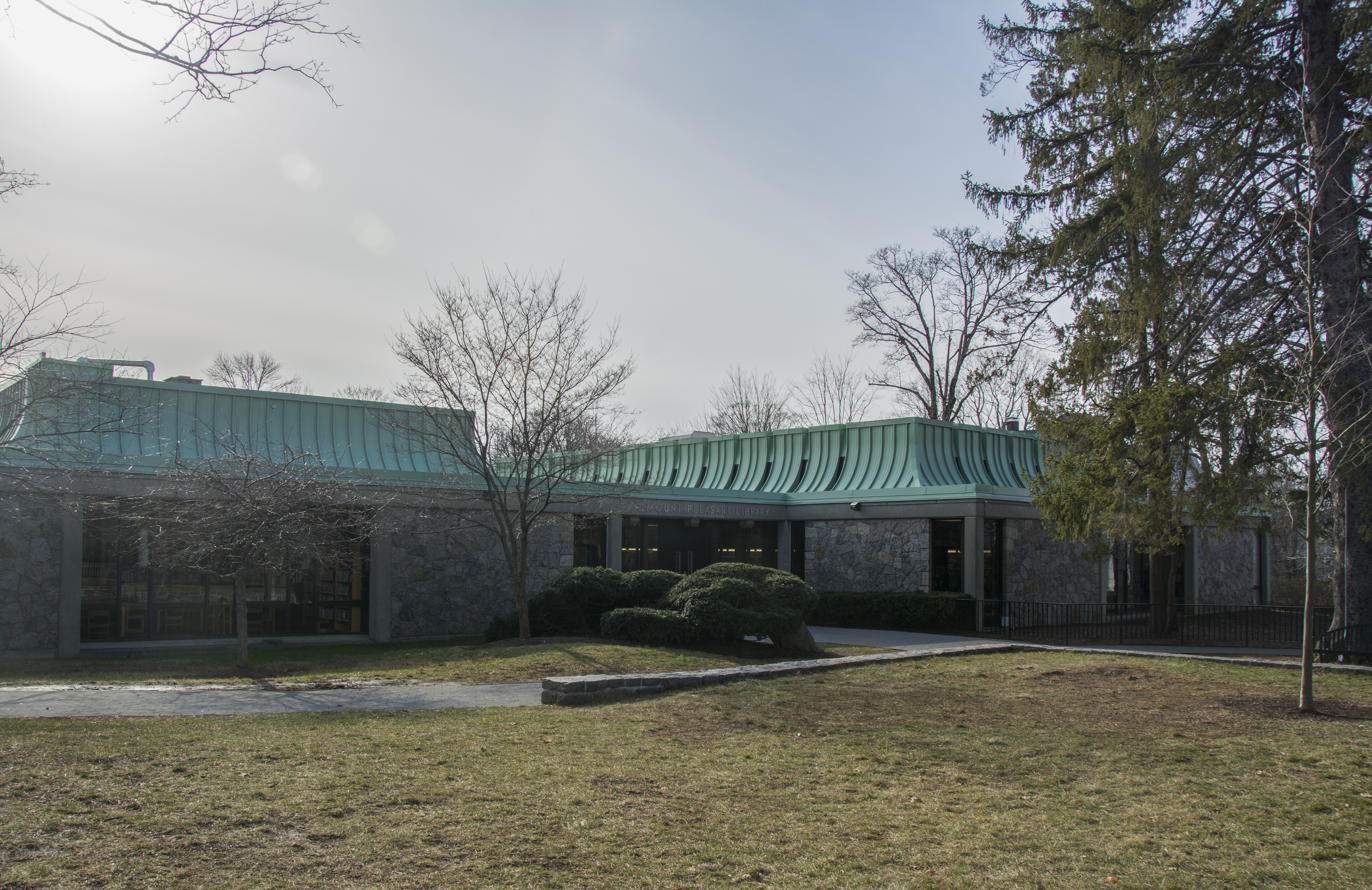
- Mount Pleasant Public Library main branch

- Flag Seal

- Location of Mount Pleasant, New York
- Coordinates: 41°6′37″N 73°47′55″W
- Country: United States
- State: New York
- County: Westchester

Government
  - Town Supervisor: Carl Fulgenzi (R) (Note: "fellow GOP-Conservative Party town board incumbents Carl Fulgenzi and Mark Rubeo were overwhelmingly reelected on Tuesday.")

Area
  - Total: 32.79 sq mi (84.92 km^{2})
  - Land: 27.45 sq mi (71.10 km^{2})
  - Water: 5.34 sq mi (13.82 km^{2})
- Elevation: 249 ft (76 m)

Population (2020)
  - Total: 44,436
  - Density: 1,623.1/sq mi (626.67/km^{2})
- Time zone: UTC-5 (Eastern (EST))
  - Summer (DST): UTC-4 (EDT)
- FIPS code: 36-49011
- GNIS feature ID: 0979244
- Website: www.mtpleasantny.gov

Mount Pleasant is a town in Westchester County, New York, United States, in the New York metropolitan area. As of the 2020 census, the town population was 44,436. The hamlets of Valhalla, Hawthorne, Pocantico Hills, and Thornwood, and the villages of Pleasantville, Sleepy Hollow, and a small portion of Briarcliff Manor lie within the town. (Note: The other portion of Briarcliff Manor lies within the neighboring town of Ossining.)

== History ==
The John D. Rockefeller Estate Kykuit in Pocantico Hills was added to the National Register of Historic Places in 1976 as a National Historic Landmark.

== Geography ==
Mount Pleasant is located about 27 miles north of Manhattan, in central Westchester County. The town is bordered to the north by New Castle and Ossining, to the west by the Hudson River, to the east by the Kensico Reservoir and the town of North Castle and to the south by Greenburgh. The boundary between Greenburgh and Mount Pleasant is the boundary between the adjacent villages of Tarrytown (in Greenburgh) and Sleepy Hollow (in Mount Pleasant), which runs along Andre Brook.

According to the United States Census Bureau, the town has a total area of 32.7 square miles (85 km^{2}), of which 27.7 square miles (72 km^{2}) is land and 5.0 square miles (13 km^{2}), or 15.26%, is water.

== Demographics ==
Historical population
| Census | Pop. | Note | %± |
|---|---|---|---|
| 1790 | 1,924 | | — |
| 1820 | 3,684 | | — |
| 1830 | 4,932 | | 33.9% |
| 1840 | 7,307 | | 48.2% |
| 1850 | 3,323 | | −54.5% |
| 1860 | 4,517 | | 35.9% |
| 1870 | 5,210 | | 15.3% |
| 1880 | 5,450 | | 4.6% |
| 1890 | 5,844 | | 7.2% |
| 1900 | 8,698 | | 48.8% |
| 1910 | 11,863 | | 36.4% |
| 1920 | 14,004 | | 18.0% |
| 1930 | 20,944 | | 49.6% |
| 1940 | 24,138 | | 15.3% |
| 1950 | 26,022 | | 7.8% |
| 1960 | 34,955 | | 34.3% |
| 1970 | 38,535 | | 10.2% |
| 1980 | 39,298 | | 2.0% |
| 1990 | 40,590 | | 3.3% |
| 2000 | 43,221 | | 6.5% |
| 2010 | 43,724 | | 1.2% |
| 2020 | 44,436 | | 1.6% |
U.S. Decennial Census

At the 2000 census there were 43,221 people, 13,737 households, and 10,522 families in the town. The population density was 1,560.5 inhabitants per square mile (602.5/km^{2}). There were 13,985 housing units at an average density of 504.9 per square mile (194.9/km^{2}). The racial makeup of the town was 84.25% White, 5.07% Black, 0.24% Native American, 3.26% Asian, 0.04% Pacific Islander, 5.02% from other races, and 2.11% from two or more races. Hispanic or Latino of any race were 14.01%.

Of the 13,737 households 38.3% had children under the age of 18 living with them, 65.0% were married couples living together, 8.4% had a female householder with no husband present, and 23.4% were non-families. 18.4% of households were one person and 7.5% were one person aged 65 or older. The average household size was 2.89 and the average family size was 3.30.

The age distribution was 26.0% under the age of 18, 8.3% from 18 to 24, 30.7% from 25 to 44, 22.6% from 45 to 64, and 12.4% 65 or older. The median age was 36 years. For every 100 females, there were 103.0 males. For every 100 females age 18 and over, there were 100.1 males.

The median household income was $81,072 and the median family income was $96,403 (these figures had risen to $103,657 and $129,077 respectively as of a 2007 estimate). Males had a median income of $60,761 versus $41,023 for females. The per capita income for the town was $35,468. About 2.6% of families and 4.9% of the population were below the poverty line, including 4.2% of those under age 18 and 3.5% of those age 65 or over.

== Communities ==
- Archville - a hamlet south of Scarborough
- Briarcliff Manor – the eastern portion of this village is located in the town
- Hawthorne – a hamlet located in the eastern portion of the town
- Pleasantville – a village located in the northeastern section of the town
- Pocantico Hills – a hamlet centrally located in the town, northeast of Sleepy Hollow and southwest of Pleasantville
- Scarborough – a hamlet in the northern part of the town, divided between Briarcliff Manor and Ossining
- Sleepy Hollow (formerly North Tarrytown) – a village located in the southwestern section of the town
- Thornwood – a hamlet located just south of Pleasantville
- Valhalla – a hamlet in the southeastern portion of the town. The hamlet is the location of the town hall.

== Biotechnology research center ==
In April 2017, Westchester County officials unveiled plans for a 3-million-square-foot biotechnology hub to be built with US$1.2 billion in private investment on vacant land adjacent to Westchester Medical Center in Valhalla. The bioscience center, a public-private partnership, is anticipated to create 12,000 new jobs and include over 2.25 million square feet of biotechnology research space.
