= Uncle Buck (franchise) =

Comedy film and television franchise created by John Hughes

- Created by: John Hughes
- Original work: Uncle Buck (1989)
- Owner: Universal Pictures
- Years: 1989–2016

Films and television
- Film(s): List of films
- Television series: List of TV series

Uncle Buck is an American comedy franchise that consists of one film and two television series. The series tells the story of the titular "Uncle Buck" Russell, a bachelor and all-around-slob who babysits his brother's rebellious teenage daughter and her younger brother and sister. Starring John Candy, Kevin Meaney, and Mike Epps, the series also co-stars Amy Madigan, Macaulay Culkin, Lacey Chabert, and Nia Long.

== Films ==
Film	U.S. release date	Director(s)	Screenwriter(s)	Producer(s)
Uncle Buck	August 16, 1989	John Hughes	John Hughes	John Hughes and Tom Jacobson

=== Uncle Buck (1989) ===
Uncle Buck marked the first film directed, written, and produced by John Hughes under a multi-picture agreement deal with Universal Studios, starring John Candy and Amy Madigan. Hughes later suggested to Chris Columbus that they cast Macaulay Culkin as Kevin McCallister in Home Alone because of his experience while shooting Uncle Buck, which also featured Candy.

== Television ==
Series	Season	Episodes	First released	Last released	Director(s)	Showrunner(s)	Network(s)
Uncle Buck	1	22 (6 unaired)	September 10, 1990	March 9, 1991	James Widdoes, John Tracy, and Art Dielhenn	Tim O'Donnell	CBS
Uncle Buck	1	8	June 14, 2016	August 2, 2016	Phil Traill, Stan Lathan, Fred Goss, Reginald Hudlin, Ken Whittingham, Victor Nelli Jr. and Ryan Case	Steven Cragg and Brian Bradley	ABC

=== Uncle Buck (1990–1991) ===
A television series was broadcast on CBS in 1990. It starred Kevin Meaney as Buck, a slob who drinks and smokes. When Bob and Cindy die in a car accident, he is named the guardian of Tia, Miles, and Maizy. Opening to negative critical ratings, after it was moved to Friday, in an attempt by CBS to establish a comedy night there, its ratings quickly plummeted and it was canceled.

=== Uncle Buck (2016) ===
In June 2016 ABC premiered a second television adaptation featuring an African-American cast with Mike Epps in the title role, James Lesure as his brother, and Nia Long as Buck's sister-in-law. It suffered a similar fate as the previous TV adaptation, as it was poorly received by critics and then cancelled after only eight episodes.

== Cast and characters ==
Characters	Film	Television series	
Characters	Uncle Buck	Uncle Buck	Uncle Buck
Characters	1989	1990–1991	2016
Buck Russell	John Candy	Kevin Meaney	Mike Epps and Tony Espinosa^{Y}
Tia Russell	Jean Louisa Kelly	Dah-ve Chodan	Iman Benson
Miles Russell	Macaulay Culkin	Jacob Gelman	Sayeed Shahidi and Big Sean^{Y}
Maizy Russell	Gaby Hoffmann	Sarah Martineck	Aalyrah Caldwell
Bob Russell	Garrett M. Brown	Mentioned	James Lesure, Blake Tanner^{Y} and Sage Correa^{Y} (as William "Will" Russell)
Cindy Russell	Elaine Bromka	Mentioned	Nia Long and Cache Melvin^{Y} (as Alexis Smith-Russell)
Cy Bug	Jay Underwood		Tony T. Roberts
E. Roger Coswell	Brian Tarantina		Bechir Sylvain
Chanice Kobolowski	Amy Madigan		
Marcie Dahlgren-Frost	Laurie Metcalf		
Asst. Principal Anita Hoargarth	Suzanne Shepherd		
Pooter the Clown	Mike Starr		
Mr. Hatfield	William Windom^{V}		
Bernie		Robert Costanzo	Michael Edward Thomas
Pete		Art Carney	Josh Dean
Tony		Eric Kay	Thomas Miles
Maggie Hogoboom		Audrey Meadows	
Nancy		Lacey Chabert	
Lucy		Rachel Jacobs	
Skank		Dennis Cockrum	
Popcorn			Jordan Black and Khai McCoy^{Y}
The Seamstress			Pernilla
The Party-Goer			Charlie Hulse
Cindy Patrellus			Kate Bergeron

== See also ==
- Home Alone, a 1990 film also written by John Hughes, starring Macaulay Culkin and featuring John Candy
