= Uncle Buck (disambiguation) =

Uncle Buck is a 1989 American comedy film starring John Candy.

Uncle Buck may also refer to:

- Uncle Buck (1990 TV series), a 1990 CBS sitcom follow-up to the film starring Kevin Meaney in the title role
- Uncle Buck (2016 TV series), a 2016 ABC sitcom loosely based on the film starring Mike Epps in the title role
