= Valhalla High School =

Valhalla High School may refer to:

- Valhalla High School (California), located in El Cajon, California
- Valhalla High School (New York), located in Valhalla, New York
