= Marita Hakala =

Finnish fashion model (born 1968)

- Born: November 10, 1968 (age 57); Ulvila, Finland
- Occupations: Fashion model, businessperson
- Partners: Vesa-Matti Loiri (1989–1993); Esa Tikkanen (2000–2002)

Marita Hakala (born 10 November 1968) is a Finnish businessperson and fashion model. After a part-time modeling career in Finland, she became a full time professional model in Milan, Italy, where her first booking was with Blumarine, a high-end fashion house.

Marita Hakala created a reality television series Mallikoulu (Model School), based on her experiences in the modeling world. The show was aired on Finland's leading broadcasting TV network MTV3 followed by a spinoff show on Sub TV on Fridays at prime time during 2005 and 2006, and 2015 on Ava. The first season's winner, Suvi Koponen, became the first international Finnish supermodel.

Marita Hakala got into the business side of modeling when she was 17 years old and started a model society called Satakunnan Mallit in Western Finland. In 2006, she co-founded a model and talent agency Casting House Inc in Helsinki, Finland. In 2014, Hakala moved to Los Angeles, joining a modeling agency and scouting new model talents. Marita Hakala also works as an entertainment reporter in the USA.

== Personal life ==
Finnish actor and musician Vesa-Matti Loiri and Marita Hakala met at Pori Jazz Festival in the summer of 1989. She was engaged with a Finnish hockey player Esa Tikkanen in 2000.
