= Ewa Bandrowska-Turska =

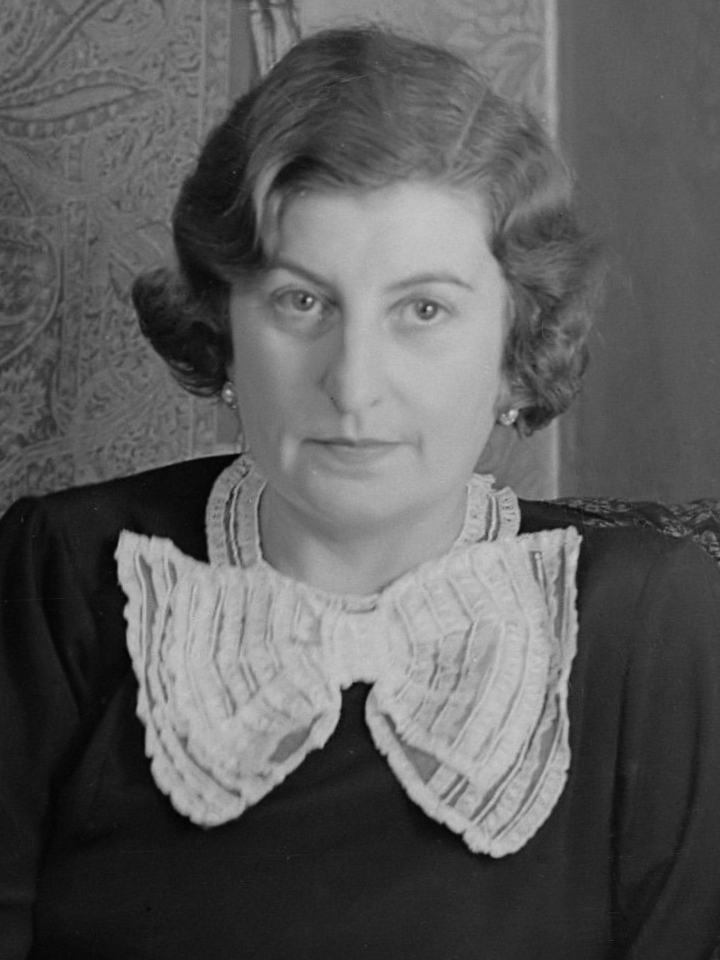
- Ewa Bandrowska-Turska in 1934
- Born: Ewa Helena Bandrowska-Turska; 20 May 1894; Kraków, Poland
- Died: 25 June 1979 (aged 85); Warsaw, Poland
- Occupation: opera singer
- Years active: 1916–1961

Ewa Bandrowska-Turska (20 May 1894 – 25 June 1979) was a Polish coloratura soprano and music educator. Her repertoire ranged from early music to early 20th-century classical music. She toured both throughout Europe and the United States and she was awarded multiple cultural prizes including the Officer's Cross of the Order of Rebirth of Poland and the Polish National Prize, First Class.

== Biography ==
Ewa Helena Bandrowska-Turska was born on 20 May 1894 in Kraków, Poland. From 1911 to 1913, she studied music in Kraków with her uncle, Aleksander Bandrowski, who was an operatic tenor, and then studied with the Polish soprano Helena Zboińska in Vienna. She debuted in Vienna in 1916 and that same year performed a concert with songs by Schubert and Schumann in Kraków. Her stage debut was as "Marguerite" in Charles Gounod's opera Faust in 1917 at the Great Theater of Warsaw.

From 1917 to 1922 she was engaged at the Lviv Theatre of Opera and Ballet, but was forced by a pulmonary infection to cease performing and seek treatment in Zakopane. After a brief stay, she was able to return to the Warsaw Opera House in 1923, where she performed through 1924. Simultaneously, between 1923 and 1925 she was engaged for performances in Poznań at the Grand Theatre. Between 1926 and 1930, she performed as a soloist in Katowice, Lviv, Poznań and Warsaw. Bandrowska-Turska made a successful tour in Paris in 1930 which began several years of touring abroad, appearing for the first time in the Soviet Union in 1934 and debuting in the United States at Carnegie Hall in 1935. She performed extensively including venues in Bratislava, Brussels, Chicago, Cleveland, Copenhagen, Hamburg, Leningrad, Moscow, New York, Nice, Odessa, Ostend, Paris, Sofia, and Stockholm.

In 1938, she sang in a film, based on Stanisław Moniuszko's opera Halka, performing the title role as a singing voice of actress Liliana Zielińska. The film opened in New York in January 1938 and was still being shown in tours in the United States in 1944 and 1945. In 1939, a special trans-Atlantic broadcast was set up from the Royal Castle in Cracow to the United States. Bandrowska-Turska performed four songs by Karol Szymanowski for U.S. audiences. From 1945 to 1949 Bandrowska-Turska served as a music professor at the State Academy of Music in Kraków and then from 1949 to 1951, she taught at the College of Opera in Poznań.

Her repertoire was diverse and included both early music and contemporary classical music. Bandrowska-Turska premiered many works by Szymanowski, including his Fairy-tale Princess for voice and orchestra, Op. 31. Tadeusz Kassern wrote a concerto for voice and orchestra, Op. 8, for her. She also performed Reinhold Glière's concerto for coloratura soprano and orchestra in F minor, Op. 82, and Alexander Arutiunian's concerto for coloratura soprano. She sang works in six languages, including French, German, Polish and Russian. Lyric operas were her specialty, and she performed in Puccini's La bohème, Verdi's La traviata, and both Manon and Werther by Jules Massenet. Some of her best-known roles were Constanza in Mozart's Die Entführung aus dem Serail, Marguerite de Valois in Meyerbeer's Les Huguenots, Leila in Bizet's Les pêcheurs de perles, the title role in Moniuszko's The Countess, and Leonora in Verdi's Il Trovatore. Her final performance was as Moniuszko's Countess in September 1961 at the Grand Theatre of Warsaw.

Bandrowska-Turska was awarded the Officer's Cross of the Order of Rebirth of Poland in 1937. In 1949, she received the Order of the Banner of Work, First Class from president Bolesław Bierut and in 1952 she was awarded the Polish National Prize First Class. Bandrowska-Turska died in Warsaw on 25 June 1979.
