= Angels in Stardust =

2014 film by William Robert Casey

- Theatrical release poster
- Directed by: William Robert Carey
- Screenplay by: William Robert Carey
- Based on: Jesus in Cowboy Boots by William Robert Carey
- Produced by: Scott Dolezal
- Starring: Alicia Silverstone; AJ Michalka; Billy Burke
- Cinematography: Alexandre Lehmann
- Edited by: Rick Spalla; Dennis Virkler
- Music by: John Hunter
- Production companies: HIP Films; Inception Film Partners
- Distributed by: High-Motor Productions
- Release date: February 21, 2014
- Running time: 96 minutes
- Country: United States
- Language: English

Angels in Stardust is a 2014 American coming-of-age comedy-drama film written and directed by William Robert Carey and starring Alicia Silverstone, AJ Michalka and Billy Burke. The film is Carey's directorial debut, and is based on his own novel Jesus in Cowboy Boots, released in 2013.

It was released in theaters and on video on demand on February 21, 2014. The film was re-released in 2016 under its original title, Jesus in Cowboy Boots. The "Angels in Stardust" title, coined by the first distributor, was unrelated to the film's story and themes, but was designed to put the film at the beginning of the alphabetical pay-per-view lists, In 2021, Carey wrote a memoir, How Not to Make a Movie: An Independent Filmmaker in Hollywood Hell, about his trials and tribulations of making the film.

== Plot ==
Vallie Sue Russell, an imaginative small-town girl, living in a dusty Texas community built on an abandoned drive-in movie lot turns to an imaginary friend, The Cowboy, for solace from her self-absorbed mother and the dangerous world around her. A mysterious Native American, Tenkill, and two local lowlifes turn Vallie Sue's world upside down, changing her life forever.

== Cast ==
- Alicia Silverstone as Tammy Russell
- AJ Michalka as Vallie Sue Russell
- Billy Burke as The Cowboy
- Amelia Rose Blaire as Loretta
- Michael Spears as Tenkill
- Jeannetta Arnette as Jacqueline Windsor
- Chandler Massey as Angelo
- Sierra Fisk as Principal
- Dennis Cockrum as Mr. Sunday
- Darin Heams as Old Ray
- Tyler Riggs as Mickey
- Adam Taylor as Pleasant Russell
- Kelly Ramel as Francine
- Sydney Sweeney as Annie
- John Mueller as Hoyt Hargrove
- Melissa Jo Bailey as Mrs. Stubblefield
