= Mallikoulu =

Finnish television reality show

- Starring: 2015: Anne Kukkohovi; Jari Leskinen; Jenni Dahlman; Laila Snellman; Vesa Peräkylä; 2006: Pipsa Hurmerinta; Lalli Savolainen; 2005: Marita Hakala; Pasi Loijas; Noora Vilva; Kalle Kuvaja
- Country of origin: Finland

Production
- Running time: 60 minutes

Original release
- Network: MTV3 and SubTV (2005–2006); AVA (2015)
- Release: 2005 – 2015

Mallikoulu (English: Model School) is a Finnish television reality show. The first season aired in 2005 on MTV3, and was followed by a half-hour follow up show on the smaller channel Sub.

The show shared some similarities to the famous American TV series America's Next Top Model hosted by Tyra Banks, however, it was not made from the same format but from a new one created by former Finnish top model Marita Hakala. Instead of making the show only for the viewers as in America's Next Top Model, its aim was to teach shy Finnish girls how to make it in the big world of Fashion based on Hakala's own experiences as a model.

== Season 1 ==
The first season of the show aired in 2005 and garnered a total of 625 000 viewers, with Suvi Koponen being announced as the winner. Koponen won a contract with leading model agency Women in Milan, Paris and New York City. Koponen later established an incredible modeling career. She worked for numerous designers including Anna Sui, Vera Wang, Marc Jacobs, Donna Karan, Anne Klein, Blumarine, Miu Miu, BCBG Max Azria, Calvin Klein, Louis Vuitton, Nina Ricci and Prada. Koponen has also had an editorial in French Vogue shot by David Sims, and has appeared in the American edition of Vogue.

=== Contestants ===
Contestant	Age	Height	Hometown	Place
Susanna	21	174 cm	Lapua	10th
Sarita	16	178 cm	Kuusjoki	9th
Satu	22	179 cm	Helsinki	8th
Julia	18	176 cm	Helsinki	7th
Martha Kämppi	16	174 cm	Kotka	6th
Jaana	17	177 cm	Loimaa	5th (quit)
Marianne Koivisto	22	174 cm	Pieksämäki	4th
Sini Säkkinen	17	174 cm	Oulu	3rd
Martina Sorvisto	22	172 cm	Pietarsaari	2nd
Suvi Koponen	16	181 cm	Vantaa	1st

== Season 2 ==
The second season of Mallikoulu aired in 2006. The winner was 16-year-old Sanni Salminen. Salminen did not achieve the same success as the previous winner, Suvi Koponen, but worked briefly as an international model before returning to school to complete her studies.

=== Contestants ===
- Jonna Ylimäki - 11th
- Jelena - 10th
- Kaisa - 9th
- Heidi Palola - 8th
- Joanna Linnainmaa - 7th
- Anni Hietamies - 6th
- Anette - 5th (replacement)
- Liisa Nurminen - 4th
- Hanna Kuvaja - 3rd
- Essi Erlands - Runner-up
- Sanni Salminen - Winner

== Season 3 ==
A third season adaption was confirmed by MTV3 to air on 29 March 2015. Anne Kukkohovi, the former host of Finland's Next Top Model, took on the position of the host with Jenni Dahlman serving as a judge. Applicants were required to be at least 16 years old to apply; the show aired on MTV AVA. The winner of the competition was 20-year-old Maya Tuominen.

=== Contestants ===
Contestant	Age	Finish	Order	Ep.1	Ep.2	Ep.3	Ep.4	Ep.5	Ep.6	Ep.7	Ep.8-10
Emma Kotilainen	17	Eliminated in Episode 2	1	Vera	Sofia	Amanda	Maya	Maya	Amanda	Amanda	Maya
Cecilia Veijola	18	Eliminated in Episode 3	2	Eveliina	Amanda	Nette	Nette	Nette	Maya	Maya	Amanda
Vera Ignatius	17	Eliminated in Episode 4	3	Maya	Maya	Maya	Amanda	Petra	Eveliina	Petra	Eveliina
Sofia Kontro Rosales	16	Eliminated in Episode 5	4	Nette	Yilin	Petra	Eveliina	Eveliina	Nette	Eveliina	Petra
Yilin Ma	19	Eliminated in Episode 6	5	Amanda	Nette	Yilin	Yilin	Amanda	Petra	Nette	
Nette Johansson	20	Eliminated in Episode 7	6	Emma	Vera	Sofia	Petra	Yilin	Yilin		
Petra Komppula	16	Eliminated in Episode 8	7	Cecilia	Petra	Eveliina	Sofia	Sofia			
Eveliina Lehtisalo	18	Eliminated in Episode 9	8	Yilin	Cecilia	Vera	Vera				
Amanda Hakalax	16	Runner-up	9	Petra	Eveliina	Cecilia					
Maya Tuominen	20	Winner	10	Sofia	Emma						

The contestant was immune from elimination.
The contestant was eliminated from the competition.
The contestant won the competition.
