= Valhalla, New York =

Hamlet in New York, United States

Valhalla
- CDP
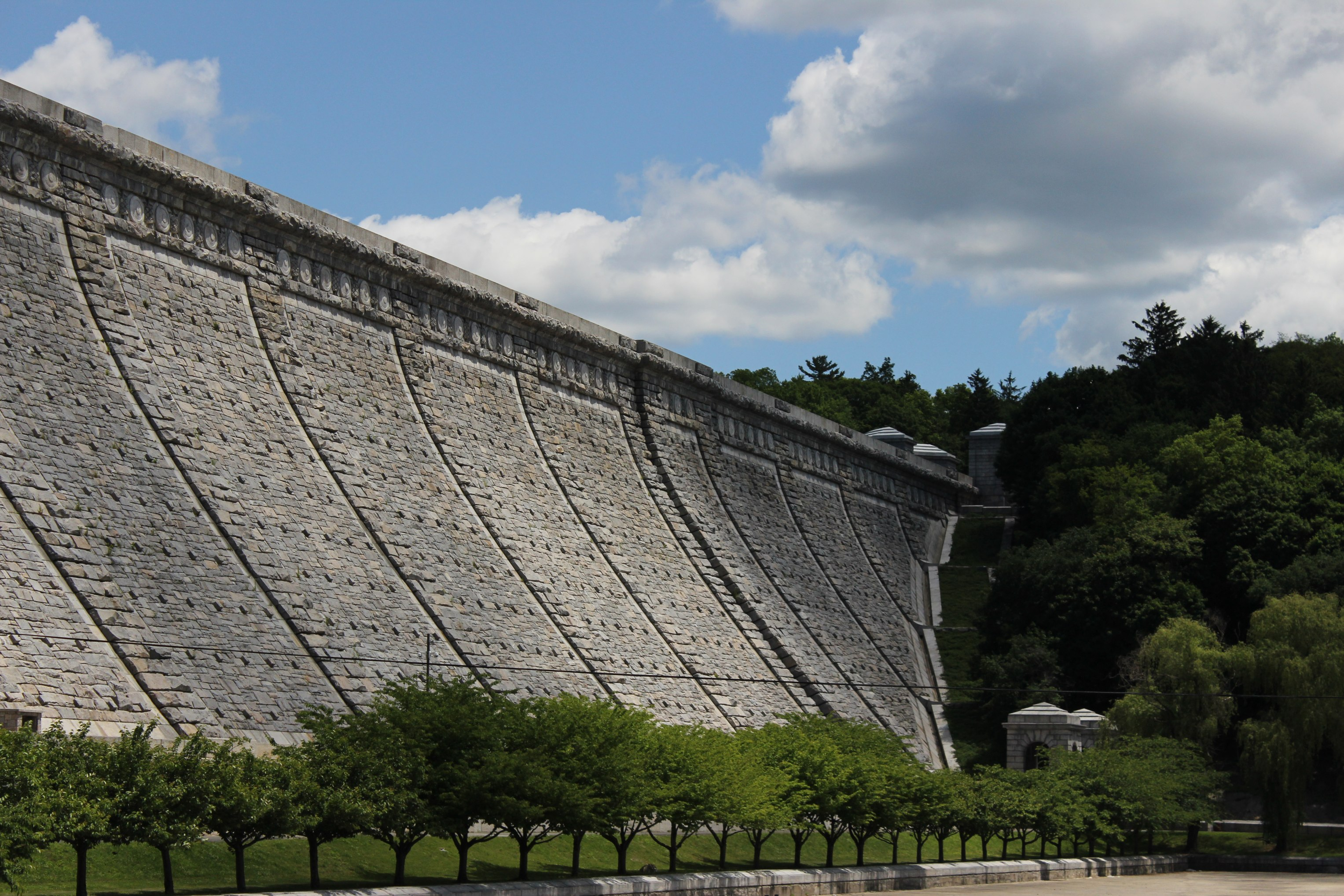
- Kensico Dam at the Kensico Reservoir in Valhalla

- Location of Valhalla, New York
- Coordinates: 41°4′30″N 73°46′31″W
- Country: United States
- State: New York
- County: Westchester
- Town: Mount Pleasant

Area
  - Total: 0.83 sq mi (2.15 km^{2})
  - Land: 0.83 sq mi (2.15 km^{2})
  - Water: 0 sq mi (0.00 km^{2})
- Elevation: 256 ft (78 m)

Population (2020)
  - Total: 3,213
  - Density: 3,873.2/sq mi (1,495.44/km^{2})
- Time zone: UTC−5 (Eastern (EST))
  - Summer (DST): UTC−4 (EDT)
- ZIP Code: 10595
- Area code: 914
- FIPS code: 36-76639
- GNIS feature ID: 0968353

Valhalla (/vælˈhælə/ val-HAL-ə) is a hamlet and census-designated place (CDP) within the town of Mount Pleasant, in Westchester County, New York, United States, in the New York City metropolitan area. As of the 2020 census, Valhalla had a population of 3,213. The hamlet is known for being the home of the primary hospital campus of Westchester Medical Center and New York Medical College as well as the burial place of numerous notable people. The hamlet's name was inspired by Valhalla, a hall for the slain in Norse mythology.

== Name ==
Valhalla was originally known as Davis Brook until it was renamed following the construction of a post office inside the hamlet's train station in 1861. At the time the station was called "Kensico", but due to the nearby hamlet of Kensico already having a post office, a unique name was needed. The name "Valhalla" was chosen by the wife of the postmaster, Andrew J. Kinch, who was an admirer of Richard Wagner's operas and, consequently, Norse mythology. In Norse lore, Valhalla is Odin's grand hall where the souls of valiant warriors are welcomed, a fitting, albeit coincidental, association for a community that would become home to a prominent cemetery. This renaming of the post office subsequently led to the hamlet itself adopting the name Valhalla around the early 20th century.

== History ==
=== Battle of Young's House ===
The area was once known as Four Corners, or Young's Corners, and was the property of Joseph Young, a local landowner. His house was a Continental Army outpost during the American Revolutionary War and became the site of a significant skirmish between British forces and American troops encamped there on February 3, 1780.

=== Kensico Cemetery ===
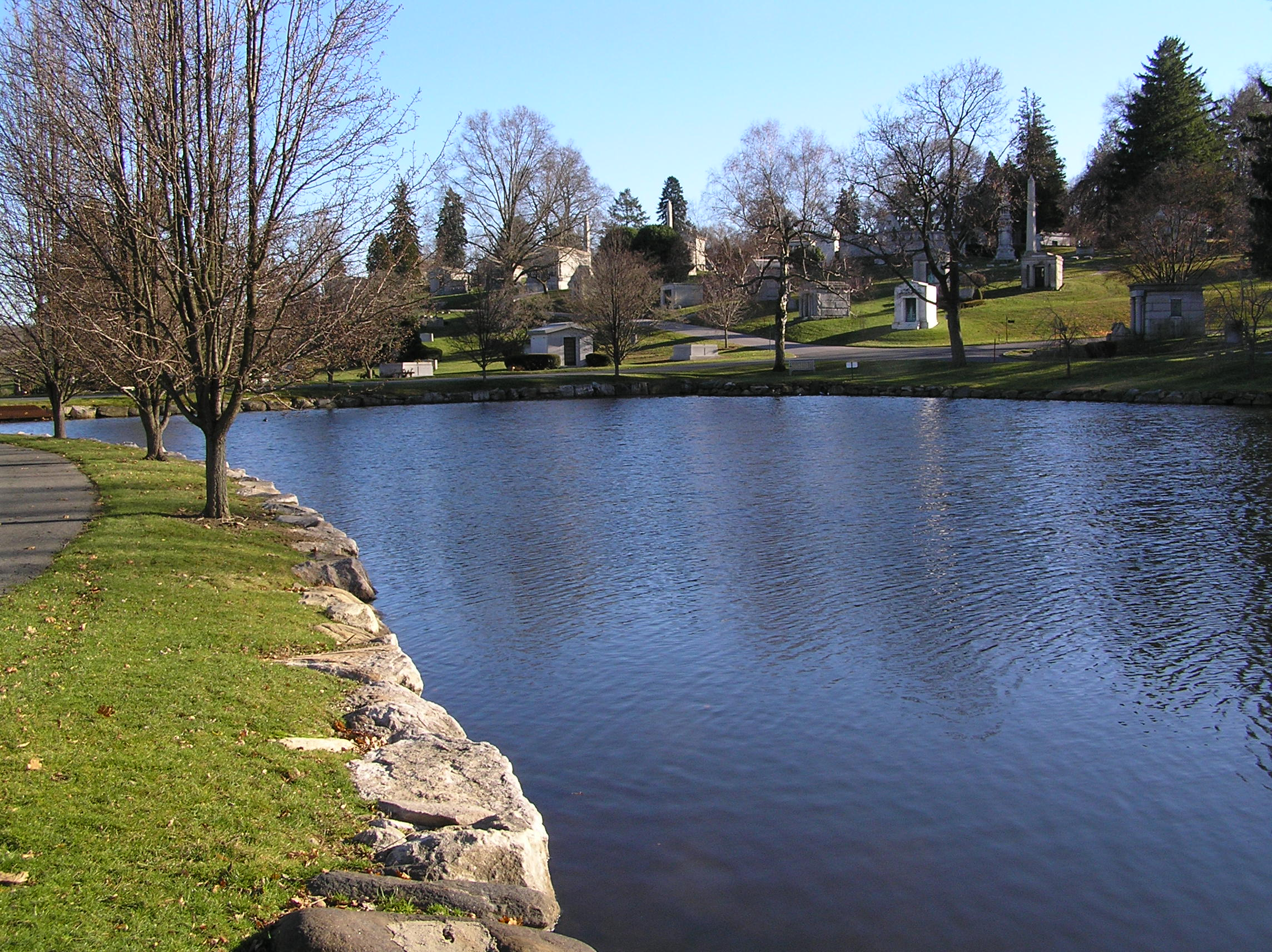
Kensico Cemetery

The Kensico Cemetery was founded in 1889 in Valhalla at a time when many of the cemeteries in the city of New York were filling up, and several rural cemeteries were founded near the railroads that served the metropolis. Initially 250 acres (100 ha) in size, the cemetery was expanded to 600 acres (2.4 km^{2}) in 1905, but reduced to 460 acres (1.9 km^{2}) in 1912, when a portion of its land was sold to the neighboring Gate of Heaven Cemetery.

The Kensico Cemetery is the final resting place of numerous famous people, including legendary New York Yankees star Lou Gehrig; virtuoso pianist, composer, and conductor Sergei Rachmaninoff; the author Ayn Rand; and NBC founder David Sarnoff. It was also, after his suicide, the final resting place of Pvt. Danny Chen.

Valhalla and neighboring Hawthorne are fairly densely packed with cemeteries, albeit not as densely as Colma, California.

=== Recent events ===
On July 12, 2006, the Westchester tornado, an F2 event, touched down in nearby Hawthorne and proceeded to move into Valhalla, causing much destruction in the Stonegate section of the community. This was one of the strongest tornadoes the area had ever seen, as tornadoes of this magnitude are more likely to form in the Midwest. The tornado knocked down power lines and uprooted hundreds of trees, but did not cause any deaths.

On September 11, 2006, The Rising memorial to September 11 victims was dedicated at the Kensico Dam by Westchester County and the Westchester County September 11 Memorial Committee. The Rising honors the 109 county residents who were killed in the terrorist attacks.

In July 2007, Valhalla hosted the opening ceremony of the 2007 Empire State Games. The ceremony was held at the Kensico Dam honoring the athletes and their families and was attended by Governor Eliot Spitzer among other politicians. ESPN's Jeremy Schaap was a keynote speaker.

On February 3, 2015, in the Valhalla train crash, a Metro-North train crashed into a Mercedes-Benz SUV that was stuck on the tracks at Commerce Street near the Taconic State Parkway. The crash caused six deaths and 15 injuries, including seven seriously injured.

== Geography ==
According to the United States Census Bureau, the hamlet has a total area of 0.81 square miles (2.1 km^{2}), all land.

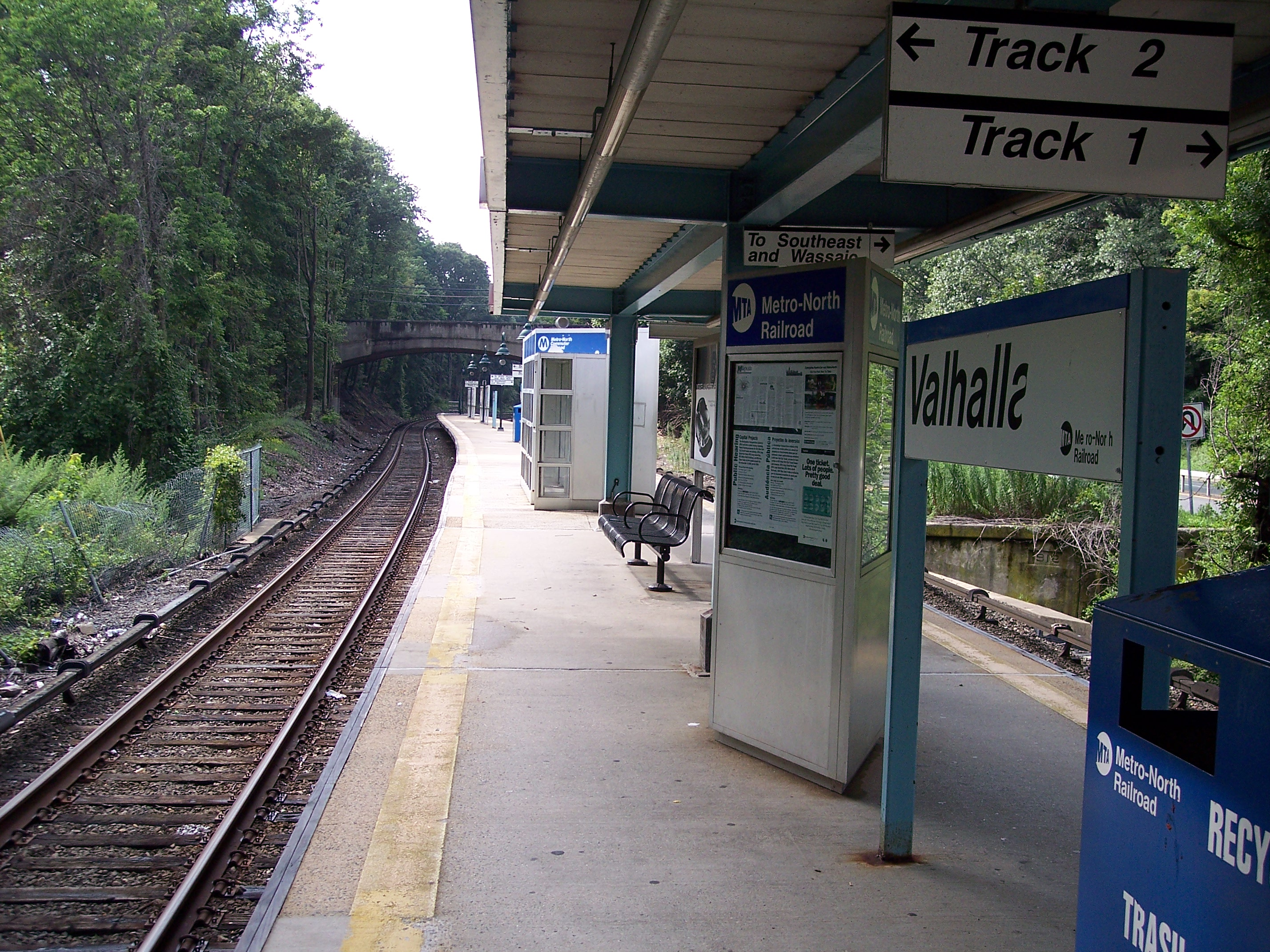
Valhalla train station

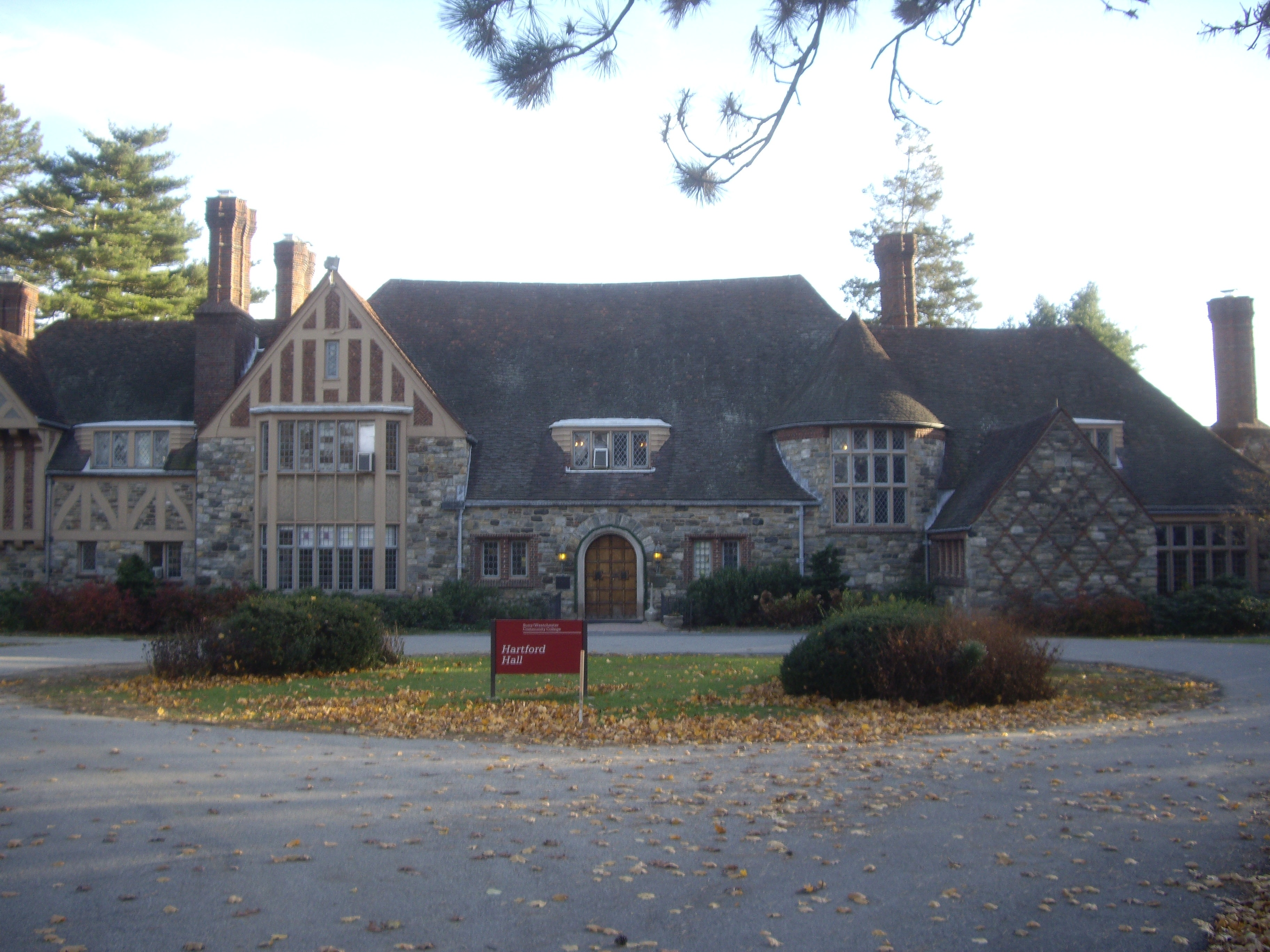
John A. Hartford House

== Demographics ==
Historical population
Census	Pop.	Note	%±
2020	3,213		—
U.S. Decennial Census

=== 2020 census ===
As of the 2020 census, Valhalla had a population of 3,213. The median age was 42.7 years. 19.5% of residents were under the age of 18 and 16.7% of residents were 65 years of age or older. For every 100 females there were 98.3 males, and for every 100 females age 18 and over there were 92.6 males age 18 and over.

100.0% of residents lived in urban areas, while 0.0% lived in rural areas.

There were 1,198 households in Valhalla, of which 35.1% had children under the age of 18 living in them. Of all households, 61.6% were married-couple households, 14.6% were households with a male householder and no spouse or partner present, and 19.6% were households with a female householder and no spouse or partner present. About 18.5% of all households were made up of individuals and 10.0% had someone living alone who was 65 years of age or older.

There were 1,237 housing units, of which 3.2% were vacant. The homeowner vacancy rate was 0.0% and the rental vacancy rate was 4.4%.

Racial composition as of the 2020 census
Race	Number	Percent
White	2,333	72.6%
Black or African American	114	3.5%
American Indian and Alaska Native	23	0.7%
Asian	216	6.7%
Native Hawaiian and Other Pacific Islander	0	0.0%
Some other race	199	6.2%
Two or more races	328	10.2%
Hispanic or Latino (of any race)	517	16.1%

=== 2010 census ===
Valhalla's population was 3,162 at the 2010 U.S. Census, an apparent decline of 2,217 that may reflect the impact of the 2006 tornado, but more likely due to redrawing of CDP borders, which can change from one census to the next.

=== 2000 census ===
As of the 2000 census, there were 5,379 people, 1,847 households, and 1,470 families residing in the hamlet. The population density was 2,010.6 inhabitants per square mile (776.3/km^{2}). There were 1,886 housing units at an average density of 704.9 per square mile (272.2/km^{2}). The racial makeup of the hamlet was 95.85% White, 0.76% African American, 0.07% Native American, 2.12% Asian, 0.02% Pacific Islander, 0.30% from other races, and 0.87% from two or more races. Hispanic or Latino of any race were 3.36% of the population.

Valhalla has a large Italian-American population. As of the 2000 U.S. census, 34.2% of residents were of Italian ancestry, the 28th highest number of Italian-Americans per capita of all communities in the United States.

Of the 1,847 households, 33.5% had children under the age of 18 living with them, 69.2% were married couples living together, 7.8% had a female householder with no husband present, and 20.4% were non-families. 16.9% of all households were made up of individuals, and 7.7% had someone living alone who was 65 years of age or older. The average household size was 2.83 and the average family size was 3.20.

In the hamlet the population was spread out, with 23.3% under the age of 18, 5.9% from 18 to 24, 28.1% from 25 to 44, 24.9% from 45 to 64, and 17.8% who were 65 years of age or older. The median age was 41 years. For every 100 females, there were 94.5 males. For every 100 females age 18 and over, there were 89.6 males.

The median income for a household in the hamlet was $76,003, and the median income for a family was $91,205. Males had a median income of $60,814 versus $38,608 for females. The per capita income for the hamlet was $33,939. About 0.6% of families and 1.7% of the population were below the poverty line, including 1.7% of those under age 18 and 1.4% of those age 65 or over.

== Economy and institutions ==
Valhalla is the location of Westchester Medical Center, New York Medical College, Westchester Community College of the State University of New York, and the Westchester County jail.

In April 2017, Westchester County officials unveiled plans for an 80-acre, 3 million square-foot biotechnology hub to be built with US$1.2 billion in private investment on vacant land adjacent to Westchester Medical Center in Valhalla; the bioscience center, a public-private partnership, is anticipated to create 12,000 new jobs and include over 2.25 million square feet of biotechnology research space.

== Highlights ==
Valhalla is the location of the Mount Pleasant Town Hall as well as the Mount Pleasant Town Pool and Community Center. The main street in Valhalla is Columbus Avenue, which runs the length of the hamlet. Along this road is the Valhalla train station. The Valhalla train station is located right off the Taconic State Parkway, across from the hamlet's commercial center. The train station is the next major stop of Metro-North Railroad after North White Plains, when proceeding northbound from New York City.

Columbus Avenue also contains the Kensico Dam, and Holy Name of Jesus Church, as well as shops and restaurants. The Valhalla ZIP Code (10595) includes portions of the towns of Mount Pleasant, Greenburgh, and North Castle. The hamlet is bordered by the North White Plains area of North Castle, the northernmost portion of the town of Greenburgh, and the hamlets of Thornwood and Hawthorne, both within Mount Pleasant. The Valhalla School District, comprising parts of the three towns, is served by the Virginia Road Elementary School, located in the southernmost part of the hamlet in Greenburgh, and the Kensico School and Valhalla Middle and High Schools, all located along Columbus Avenue in Mount Pleasant. Some residents with Valhalla addresses are in the Mount Pleasant Central School District, served by Westlake High School in Thornwood. The John A. Hartford House was added to the National Register of Historic Places in 1977 as a National Historic Landmark. It serves as administrative offices of SUNY Westchester Community College.

== Education ==
Public education in Valhalla is provided by the Valhalla Union Free School District, which operates four schools: Virginia Road School, Kensico School, Valhalla Middle School, and Valhalla High School.

Some areas of Valhalla are served by Westlake High School, located in nearby Thornwood.

The Roman Catholic Archdiocese of New York previously operated a Catholic school in Valhalla, Holy Name of Jesus School, which closed in 2013.

== Notable people ==
- Kevin Meaney (1956–2016), actor and comedian
- Dalmazio Santini (1923–2001), composer
- Sal Yvars (1924–2008), Major League Baseball player
