= Valhalla Union Free School District =

School district in the U.S. state of New York

The Valhalla Union Free School District (VUFSD) is located in Valhalla, New York.

It operates four schools: Virginia Road School, Kensico School, Valhalla Middle School, and Valhalla High School.

Brenda Myers became superintendent in 2010, and she retired from her career in 2017. In September 2017 Karen Geelan became the superintendent.
