= Dwayne Hay =

Canadian ice hockey player (born 1977)

- Born: February 11, 1977 (age 49) London, Ontario, Canada
- Height: 6 ft 1 in (185 cm)
- Weight: 203 lb (92 kg; 14 st 7 lb)
- Position: Left wing
- Shot: Left
- Played for: Washington Capitals; Florida Panthers; Tampa Bay Lightning; Calgary Flames
- NHL draft: 43rd overall, 1995; Washington Capitals
- Playing career: 1997–2011

Dwayne Hay (born February 11, 1977) is a Canadian former professional ice hockey player who played in the National Hockey League (NHL) for the Washington Capitals, Florida Panthers, Tampa Bay Lightning, and Calgary Flames.

== Playing career ==
=== NHL ===
Originally selected by the Washington Capitals in the 1995 NHL entry draft, Hay played two games with the Capitals before he was traded to the Florida Panthers in exchange for Esa Tikkanen in what turned out to be their run to the finals in 1998. Hay also played for the Tampa Bay Lightning and Calgary Flames.

Hay compiled 6 points in 79 NHL games.

=== Minor leagues ===
Hay also spent time in the American Hockey League, ECHL, and the Central Hockey League. During his time with the Pensacola Ice Pilots of the ECHL, Hay was named the In Glas Co ECHL Player of the Week for the week of December 13–19, 2004.

Hay had initially signed with the Fresno Falcons of the ECHL in July 2007 as a training camp invite but was eventually released by the team in October. Upon being released by the Falcons, Hay had agreed to play with the Nottingham Panthers of the EIHL. Two days after agreeing to terms, Hay announced that he "would not be in a position to pass a medical on arrival and has been forced to retire from the sport". Despite this, Hay then played with the Bentley Generals of the Chinook Hockey League for the 2007-08 hockey season.

He agreed to play with the Corner Brook Royals during the 2008-09 season. Despite promising to "at least play all home games", Hay was a no-show to several team functions a week prior to the Royals' first home game, and decided to play with the then-Swedish Division 1 team Örebro HK.

Hay signed with the Arizona Sundogs of the Central Hockey League on January 28, 2009.

Hay most recently played with HC Alleghe of Serie A, a top-tier ice hockey league in Italy.

== Career statistics ==
=== Regular season and playoffs ===
			Regular season					Playoffs
Season	Team	League	GP	G	A	Pts	PIM	GP	G	A	Pts	PIM
1994–95	Guelph Storm	OHL	65	26	28	54	37	14	5	7	12	6
1995–96	Guelph Storm	OHL	60	28	30	58	49	16	4	9	13	18
1996–97	Guelph Storm	OHL	32	17	17	34	21	11	4	6	10	0
1997–98	Portland Pirates	AHL	58	6	7	13	35	—	—	—	—	—
1997–98	New Haven Beast	AHL	10	3	2	5	4	2	0	0	0	0
1997–98	Washington Capitals	NHL	2	0	0	0	2	—	—	—	—	—
1998–99	Florida Panthers	NHL	9	0	0	0	0	—	—	—	—	—
1998–99	New Haven Beast	AHL	46	18	17	35	22	—	—	—	—	—
1999–00	Louisville Panthers	AHL	41	11	20	31	18	—	—	—	—	—
1999–00	Florida Panthers	NHL	6	0	0	0	2	—	—	—	—	—
1999–00	Tampa Bay Lightning	NHL	13	1	1	2	2	—	—	—	—	—
2000–01	Calgary Flames	NHL	49	1	3	4	16	—	—	—	—	—
2001–02	Saint John Flames	AHL	70	5	12	17	39	—	—	—	—	—
2002–03	St. John's Maple Leafs	AHL	51	10	19	29	31	—	—	—	—	—
2003–04	Pensacola Ice Pilots	ECHL	62	29	30	59	40	5	1	3	4	2
2003–04	Hershey Bears	AHL	4	0	1	1	0	—	—	—	—	—
2004–05	Pensacola Ice Pilots	ECHL	72	24	33	57	68	4	2	0	2	8
2005–06	Rio Grande Valley Killer Bees	CHL	62	15	35	50	38	6	1	2	3	2
2006–07	Pensacola Ice Pilots	ECHL	38	13	13	26	36	—	—	—	—	—
2008–09	Arizona Sundogs	CHL	22	6	13	19	21	—	—	—	—	—
2009–10	HC Alleghe	Serie B	35	4	7	11	32	4	0	0	0	4
2010–11	Bentley Generals	ChiHL	5	2	5	7	2	—	—	—	—	—
NHL totals			79	2	4	6	22	—	—	—	—	—

== Personal ==
Hay currently resides in London, Ontario, coaching London Cobras U9, while offering Hockey Development Camps on weekends and PA Days for hockey players born 2009 and younger. Hay previously resided in Calgary, Alberta and ran the DH One Speed Athletics Hockey School and Bootcamps.
