= Dennis Cockrum =

American actor

Dennis Cockrum is an American actor, best known for portraying Terry Milkovich on the American comedy-drama television series Shameless and appearing in over 100 films and television shows such as Firefly, Uncle Buck, Gangster Squad, Hail, Caesar!, and The West Wing.

== Life & career ==
Cockrum received an M.A. in Dramatic Arts from Eastern Michigan University.

Cockrum's first character role was in John Hughes's 1989 comedy Uncle Buck. He then went on to star in Extreme Movie, Rebound, Hail, Caesar!; and as Elmer Jackson in Gangster Squad, Detective Tom Farrell in The Glimmer Man, Mr. Sunday in Angels in Stardust and Uncle Billy in Downeast.

Cockrum has also appeared on stage. For his first performance in Tom Stoppard's play Rosencrantz and Guildenstern Are Dead, Cockram received the Joseph Jefferson Award.

He performed in the original 2006 Broadway play Frost/Nixon by British playwright Peter Morgan; and regional productions such as Dead End by Sidney Kingsley at the Ahmanson Theatrein Los Angeles, Lincoln Park Zoo by Richard Strand at Geva Theatre, Amadeus by Peter Shaffer, Private Lives by Noël Coward, and Crimes of the Heart by Beth Henley at Snowmass Repertory in Colorado. In June 2025, Cockrum starred in the production Golden Leaf Ragtime Blues by Charles Smith.

In a June 2021 interview with Brett Allan, Cockrum stated that he has been a member of SAG-AFTRA for forty years. He is also a member of the A.E.A. and the Academy of Television Arts & Sciences. Cockrum is the father of actress Stella Cockrum.

== Partial Filmography ==
=== Film ===
Year	Title	Role	Notes
1989	Uncle Buck	Pal	
1991	Cold Justice	Patrick	
2008	Extreme Movie	Len's Dad	
2013	Gangster Squad	Elmer Jackson	
2016	Hail, Caesar!	Cop at French Postcard House	
2016	Angels in Stardust	Mr. Sunday	
2021	Downeast	Uncle Billy	

=== Television ===
Year	Title	Role	Notes
1982	Chicago Story	Lonnie Wadkins	
1990	Cop Rock	Glen	
1990-1991	Uncle Buck	Shank	
1991	In a Child's Name	Gregg Reid	
1992	Major Dad	Louie	
1992	Married... with Children	Ray the Bartender	
1993	Cheers	Pat McDougall	
1993	Star Trek: The Next Generation	Corvallen Freighter Captain	
1993	The King of Queens	Jeffrey	
2000	JAG	Vic Velasco	Episode: "Real Deal SEAL"
2002-2004	Malcolm in the Middle	Lieutenant Sortino	
2004-2006	Boston Legal	Detective Jacobs	
2004	Joan of Arcadia	Roger Franz	
2009	The Young and the Restless	Dr. Donahue	
2009	Southland	Tom	
2013	Liv and Maddie	Baxter Fontanel	
2015	Masters of Sex	Francis Masters	
2016	Brooklyn Nine-Nine	Deputy Inspector Flynt	
2017	American Horror Story	Senator Herbert Jackson	
2018	Chicago Med	Ray Burke	
2011-2021	Shameless	Terry Milkovich	
2023	Pretty Freekin Scary	Theodore Snickering	
2023	NCIS	Senator	
