= Esa Tikkanen =

Finnish ice hockey player (b. 1965)

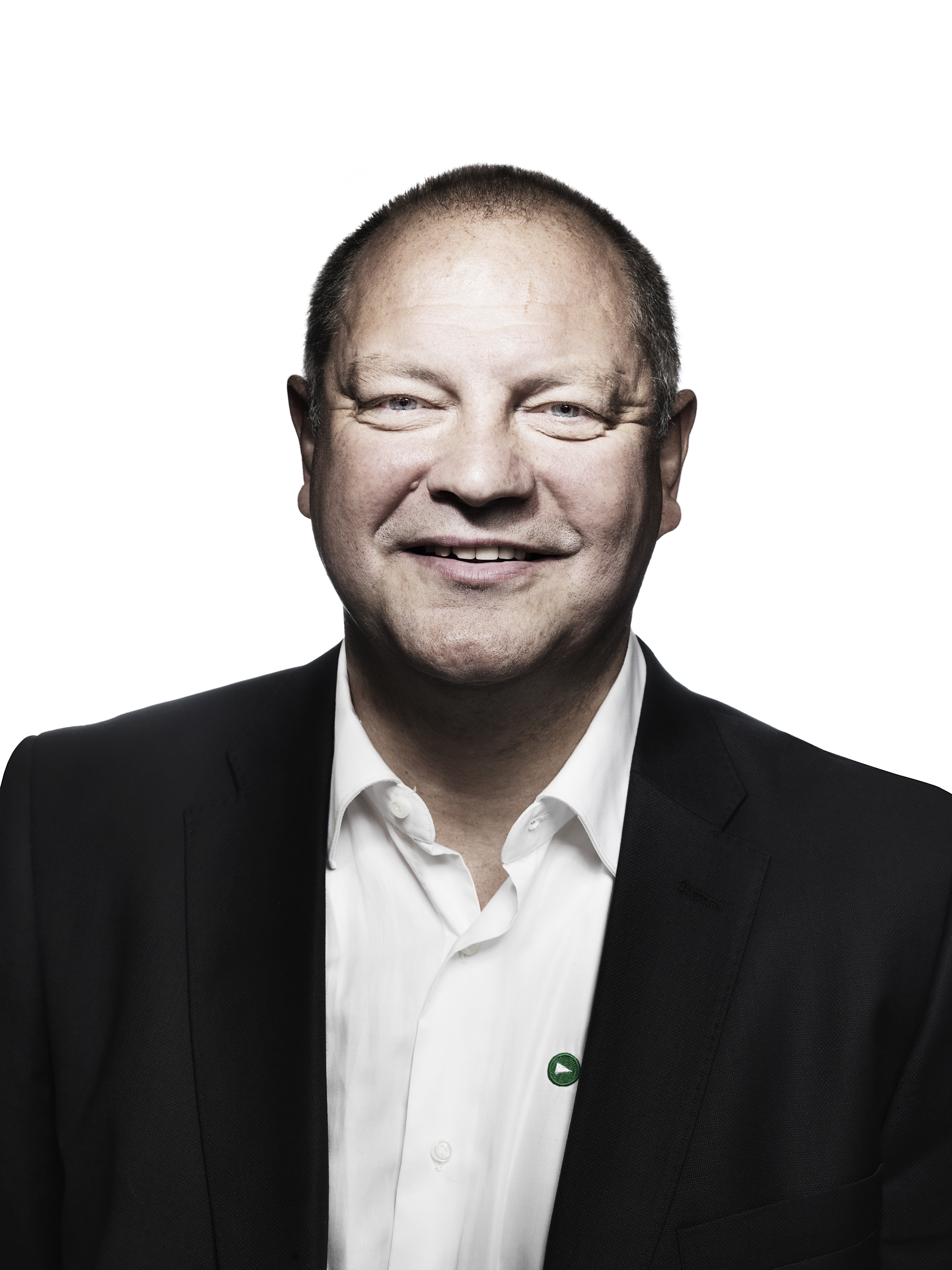
- Tikkanen in 2013
- Born: January 25, 1965 (age 61) Helsinki, Finland
- Height: 6 ft 1 in (185 cm)
- Weight: 190 lb (86 kg; 13 st 8 lb)
- Position: Left wing
- Shot: Left
- Played for: HIFK; Edmonton Oilers; New York Rangers; St. Louis Blues; New Jersey Devils; Vancouver Canucks; Florida Panthers; Washington Capitals; Jokerit; Essen Mosquitoes; Anyang Halla
- National team: Finland
- NHL draft: 80th overall, 1983; Edmonton Oilers
- Playing career: 1983–2001; 2004–2005

Esa Tikkanen (born January 25, 1965) is a Finnish former professional ice hockey forward. He played in the National Hockey League (NHL) for the Edmonton Oilers, the New York Rangers, the St. Louis Blues, the New Jersey Devils, the Vancouver Canucks, the Florida Panthers, and the Washington Capitals, and won the Stanley Cup five times in his career, including in 1985, 1987, 1988, 1990 with the Oilers, and 1994 with the Rangers. He recorded 72 goals as a left wing in the playoffs, which was the most for the position until he was passed by Alex Ovechkin.

== Background and early career ==
Esa Tikkanen began his career in hockey as a little boy by being a mascot for Jokerit, a team based in Helsinki, but joined another local team HJK in juniors. After spending a year in Canada in 1981–82 with the Regina Blues of the Saskatchewan Junior Hockey League and the Regina Pats of the Western Hockey League, Tikkanen returned to Finland and signed a contract with HIFK. Tikkanen was drafted in the fourth round (80th overall) by the Oilers in the 1983 NHL entry draft. In 1984–85, he played 36 games for HIFK in the Finnish SM-liiga before joining the Oilers during their 1985 playoff run. He played briefly in the American Hockey League for the Oilers' affiliate, the Nova Scotia Oilers in 1985–86, before joining the team full-time.

== NHL playing career ==
=== Start in Edmonton ===
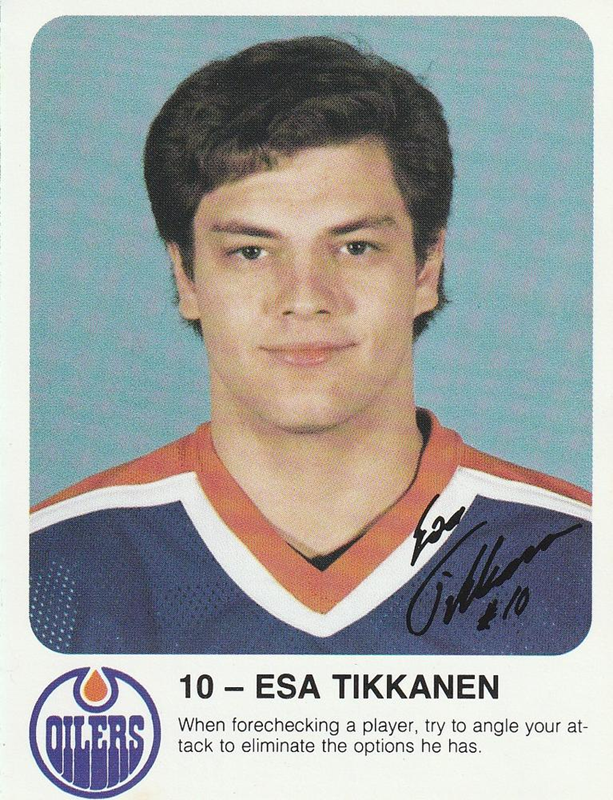
1985 card of Tikkanen for the Edmonton Oilers

Tikkanen made his NHL debut with the Edmonton Oilers during the second game of the 1985 Stanley Cup playoffs. By playing one game in the Final that year, he was eligible to have his name engraved on the Stanley Cup even before playing his first regular-season game in the NHL. He soon became an important part of the Oilers, playing on the team's first line with Wayne Gretzky and Jari Kurri. Kurri and Gretzky's roles were to score goals; Tikkanen was the line's defensive player. Oilers coach and general manager Glen Sather once suggested that Tikkanen should be awarded the Frank J. Selke trophy (the award for the best defensive forward in the NHL). He was a finalist several times in his career, and was a three-time runner-up, but never won the award. Tikkanen excelled at distracting and confusing opponents with his Tiki-Talk and shadowed Gretzky when he was with the Los Angeles Kings. Between 1986 and 1990, Tikkanen scored 30 or more goals three times and was on three more Cup champions. In 1991, he led the Edmonton Oilers in points in the regular season with 69 points.

=== Time after Oilers ===
In March 1993, Tikkanen was traded to the New York Rangers for Doug Weight, and he was part of that team's 1994 Stanley Cup victory, scoring 22 goals and 54 points in 83 regular-season games. In July 1994, Tikkanen was traded with Doug Lidster to the St. Louis Blues in exchange for Petr Nedvěd.

The start of the NHL's 1994–95 season was delayed by a lockout, during which Tikkanen returned to Finland to play for HIFK Helsinki. After the lockout Tikkanen, played with the Blues during the shortened 1994–95 season, and appeared in 11 games in 1995–96 before a trade sent him to the New Jersey Devils. Three weeks later he was again dealt, this time to the Vancouver Canucks.

The 1996–97 season saw him involved in yet another midseason trade, back to the Rangers, on March 8, 1997. Although he contributed only one goal in 14 regular-season games with New York, he came alive in the playoffs, scoring 9 times in 15 games. Of the Rangers, only Gretzky, with 10, outscored Tikkanen. The Rangers eliminated the Florida Panthers and New Jersey Devils before falling to the Philadelphia Flyers in the Eastern Conference final.

The 32-year-old Tikkanen became a free agent in the summer of 1997, and he signed with the Panthers, but this would also prove to be a short stay. By March 1998 he had appeared in only 28 games, and Florida traded him to the Washington Capitals for Dwayne Hay. He appeared in all 21 of Washington's playoff games, as the Capitals went to the Stanley Cup Final, where they were swept in four straight games by the Detroit Red Wings. Tikkanen is remembered for missing a wide-open shot on goal that would have iced game two, which has been described as a turning point of the Series. This was to be Tikkanen's last full season in the NHL. After becoming a free agent prior to the 1998–99 season, he signed for a third stint with the Rangers. However, he only played in 32 games before an injury sidelined him for the rest of the season.

Before the start of the 1999–2000 season, Tikkanen attended the Oilers' training camp and was offered a role of playing coach in the minors. Tikkanen declined the offer and returned to Finland, where he played a full season with Jokerit. In 877 NHL games, he had scored 244 goals and 386 assists for 630 points, while racking up 1,077 minutes in penalties. In 186 Stanley Cup playoff games, he scored 72 goals and 60 assists for 132 points, with 275 penalty minutes.

=== Post NHL career ===
In 1999–2000, Tikkanen played a season with the Helsinki-based team Jokerit, a rival team of HIFK, with whom Tikkanen had played earlier in his career. Jokerit finished in second place in the SM-Liiga. In 2000–01, Tikkanen moved to Germany, where he played what was to be his last season in a recognized professional league for Essen Mosquitoes of the DEL. He retired in 2001.

During the 2004–05 season, Tikkanen resurfaced again, this time as a player-coach for the Anyang Halla, a South Korean team in the Asia League Ice Hockey. Though he predicted that he and his two linemates would finish 1-2-3 in scoring, he finished tied for fourth on his team, with 8 goals and 17 assists for 25 points in 30 games. He was 29th in the league in assists, and didn't crack the top 30 in goals or points. He did, however, lead Halla in penalty minutes with 58 (tied for 28th in the league). Halla finished fifth in the league and did not make the playoffs.

After one season in Korea, Tikkanen became the coach for the Frisk Tigers of the Norwegian GET-ligaen. Tikkanen was head coach only for the 2005–06 season.

On 27 December 2010 Jokipojat from Joensuu, Finland, announced that Tikkanen would be the head coach of the team for the rest of the 2010–11 season. Jokipojat plays in Mestis, which is the second-highest league in Finland.

== International play ==
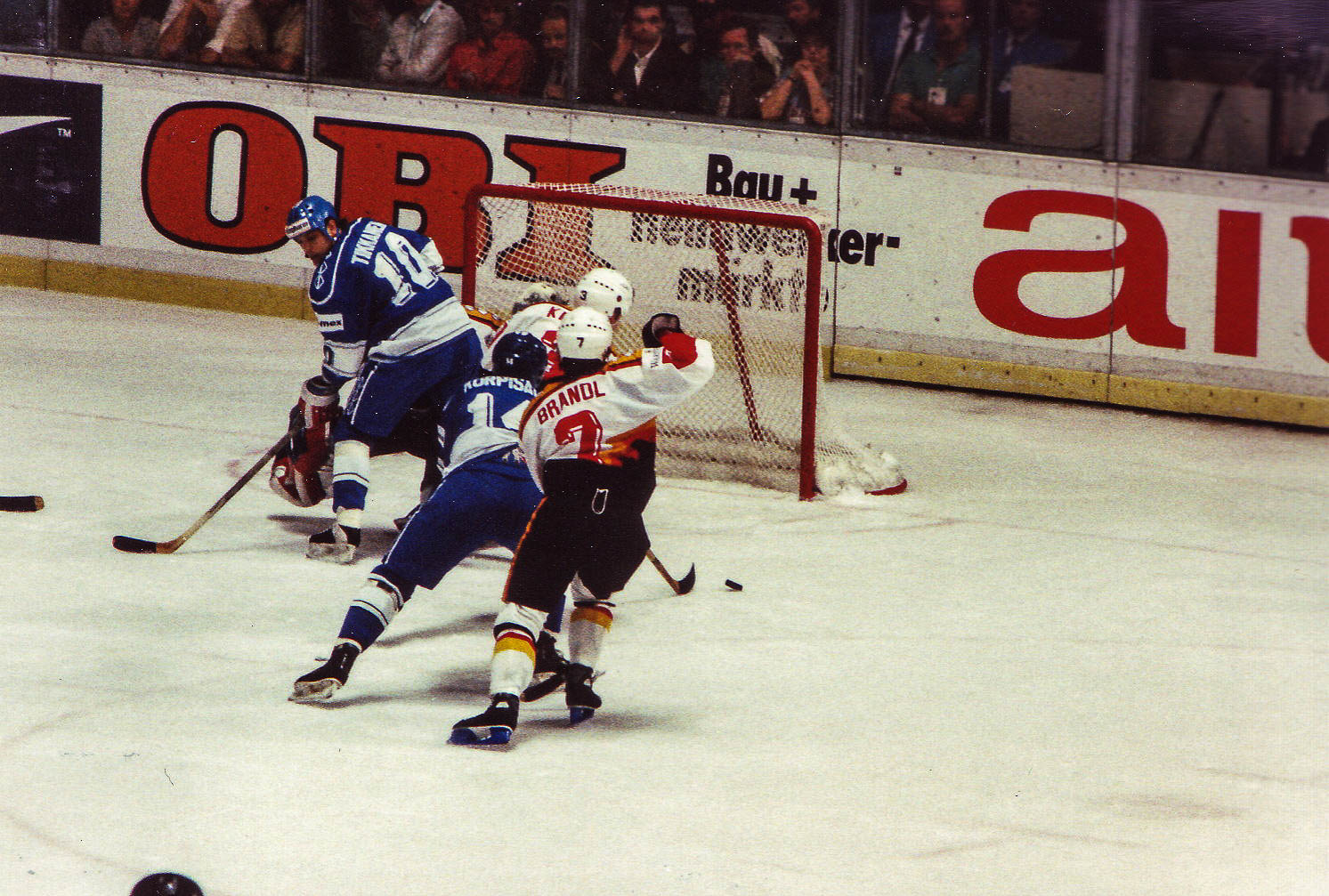
- Tikkanen (number 10) battling against Germany at the 1993 World Championships

Medal record

Representing Finland

Men's ice hockey

Olympic Games
Bronze medal – third place	1998 Nagano	Ice hockey

World Championships
Bronze medal – third place	2000 Russia	Ice hockey

World Junior Championships
Silver medal – second place	1984 Sweden	Ice hockey

Esa Tikkanen played 81 games for the Finnish National team.

Tikkanen participated in two Canada Cups, 5 World Championship tournaments, and the 1998 Winter Olympics.

== Notable achievements ==
Tikkanen won the Stanley Cup four times as a member of the Oilers and once more as a member of the Rangers. His various acquisitions were by teams craving him for his playoff experience and success: in 877 regular season games he scored 244 goals, but in 186 playoff games he scored 72 goals, which puts him 14th all time in NHL playoff scoring, and 38th all time in play-offs points with 132 points. "Tik" was known for his ability to score clutch goals but also for his general style of play—chippy and aggressive. He was nicknamed "The Grate One" (a pun on teammate Gretzky's moniker "The Great One") for his ability to irritate opposing players, often just by talking to them in his Finnish-English "Tikkanese" or "Tiki-Talk." His regular-season totals were 244 goals, 386 assists, and 1077 penalty minutes. In the playoffs, he added 72 goals, 60 assists, and 275 penalty minutes. Tikkanen also led the Edmonton Oilers with 69 points in the 1990–91 regular season. Tikkanen holds the NHL record for scoring two shorthanded goals in the shortest time (10 seconds apart). With 436 points and 178 goals as a member of the Edmonton Oilers, he is ranked 10th in points and 8th in goals in the team's history. He is also the Edmonton 6th all-time scoring leader in team play-offs with 97 points, and 5th in goals with 51. He is also tied for the 20th all-time regular season short-handed goals leader with 29. He is also tied 4th all-time in play-offs overtime goals leader with 4 goals.

Tikkanen appeared in an episode of the Trailer Park Boys: Out of the Park in 2016.

In the 2009 book 100 Ranger Greats, the authors ranked Tikkanen at No. 85 all-time of the 901 New York Rangers who had played during the team's first 82 seasons.

=== Tikkanese ===
Tikkanen is famous for his Finnish-English, sometimes referred to as "Tikkanese" or "Tiki-Talk." Even members of his team often did not understand what he was saying. Wayne Gretzky once commented, "He brings something special. I don't know what it is, but if you ask him, you couldn't understand his answer." Former Edmonton Oiler coach and teammate Craig MacTavish said, "Esa talks twice as much as anybody else. That's because you can understand just half what he says."

Even fellow Finn Jari Kurri had difficulty understanding Tikkanen. During their tenure with the Oilers, Tikkanen let go with a particularly colourful pronouncement, after which another player turned to Kurri and asked, "What did he just say?" Kurri simply shook his head; "I have no idea."

== Personal life ==
Esa Tikkanen has been married three times. His first wife was Swede Ann Charlotte (Lotta) Kraft, and they have two daughters, Sabrina and Stephanie. The couple separated in 2000, after 17 years of marriage. He started dating Finnish model Marita Hakala in 2000; however, Hakala called off the engagement in 2002. In 2004, Esa Tikkanen married Tua Backman; the couple had three children together (two sons and a daughter) before divorcing in 2014. In 2015, Tikkanen became engaged to Tuuli, a Finnish physiotherapist from Somero; the couple married in 2016.

== Awards and achievements ==
- 1982–83 – SM-Liiga – Kanada-malja (HIFK)
- 1984–85 – NHL – Stanley Cup (Edmonton)
- 1986–87 – NHL – Stanley Cup (Edmonton)
- 1987–88 – NHL – Stanley Cup (Edmonton)
- 1989–90 – NHL – Stanley Cup (Edmonton)
- 1993–94 – NHL – Stanley Cup (New York Rangers)
- Matti Keinonen trophy for best plus/minus in the SM-liiga – 1985
- Jokerit retired Tikkanen's number 5 in 2001. The decision was controversial because Tikkanen played only one professional season for Jokerit, in contrast to the four seasons he spent with their local rivals, HIFK. The use of number 5, rather than the number 10 he wore for the majority of his professional career, originated from a sweater made by his great-grandmother that Tikkanen wore while serving as a Jokerit mascot. During this period, Jokerit owner Aimo Mäkinen promised Tikkanen that the club would eventually retire the number.
- Tikkanen finished as runner-up for the Frank J. Selke Trophy three times.

== Tikkanen, the racehorse ==
The 1994 Breeders' Cup Turf was won by Tikkanen, a Thoroughbred racehorse named in Esa Tikkanen's honor by George W. Strawbridge, Jr., owner of Augustin Stable and an active director of the Buffalo Sabres NHL ice hockey club and a member of the team's executive committee for more than thirty years.

== Transactions ==
- March 17, 1993 – Traded by the Edmonton Oilers to the New York Rangers in exchange for Doug Weight.
- July 24, 1994 – Traded by the New York Rangers, along with Doug Lidster to the St. Louis Blues in exchange for Petr Nedvěd.
- November 1, 1995 – Traded by the St. Louis Blues to the New Jersey Devils in exchange for New Jersey's 1997 third round draft choice.
- November 23, 1995 – Traded by the New Jersey Devils to the Vancouver Canucks in exchange for Vancouver's 1996 second round draft choice.
- March 8, 1997 – Traded by the Vancouver Canucks, along with Russ Courtnall, to the New York Rangers in exchange for Sergei Nemchinov and Brian Noonan.
- September 17, 1997 – Signed as a free agent with the Florida Panthers.
- March 9, 1998 – Traded by the Florida Panthers to the Washington Capitals in exchange for Dwayne Hay and future considerations.
- October 9, 1998 – Signed as a free agent with the New York Rangers.

== Career statistics ==
=== Regular season and playoffs ===
			Regular season					Playoffs
Season	Team	League	GP	G	A	Pts	PIM	GP	G	A	Pts	PIM
1981–82	Regina Blues	SJHL	59	38	37	75	216	—	—	—	—	—
1981–82	Regina Pats	WHL	2	0	0	0	0	—	—	—	—	—
1982–83	HIFK	FIN U20	30	34	31	65	104	4	4	3	7	10
1982–83	HIFK	SM-l	—	—	—	—	—	1	0	0	0	2
1983–84	HIFK	FIN U20	6	5	9	14	13	4	4	3	7	8
1983–84	HIFK	SM-l	36	19	11	30	30	2	0	1	1	0
1984–85	HIFK	SM-l	36	21	34	55	42	—	—	—	—	—
1984–85	Edmonton Oilers	NHL	—	—	—	—	—	3	0	0	0	2
1985–86	Edmonton Oilers	NHL	35	7	6	13	28	8	3	2	5	7
1986–87	Edmonton Oilers	NHL	76	34	44	78	120	21	7	2	9	22
1987–88	Edmonton Oilers	NHL	80	23	51	74	153	19	10	17	27	72
1988–89	Edmonton Oilers	NHL	67	31	47	78	92	7	1	3	4	12
1989–90	Edmonton Oilers	NHL	79	30	33	63	161	22	13	11	24	26
1990–91	Edmonton Oilers	NHL	79	27	42	69	85	18	12	8	20	24
1991–92	Edmonton Oilers	NHL	40	12	16	28	44	16	5	3	8	8
1992–93	Edmonton Oilers	NHL	66	14	19	33	76	—	—	—	—	—
1992–93	New York Rangers	NHL	15	2	5	7	18	—	—	—	—	—
1993–94	New York Rangers	NHL	83	22	32	54	114	23	4	4	8	34
1994–95	HIFK	SM-l	19	2	11	13	16	—	—	—	—	—
1994–95	St. Louis Blues	NHL	43	12	23	35	22	7	2	2	4	20
1995–96	St. Louis Blues	NHL	11	1	4	5	18	—	—	—	—	—
1995–96	New Jersey Devils	NHL	9	0	2	2	4	—	—	—	—	—
1995–96	Vancouver Canucks	NHL	38	13	24	37	14	6	3	2	5	2
1996–97	Vancouver Canucks	NHL	62	12	15	27	66	—	—	—	—	—
1996–97	New York Rangers	NHL	14	1	2	3	6	15	9	3	12	26
1997–98	Florida Panthers	NHL	28	1	8	9	16	—	—	—	—	—
1997–98	Washington Capitals	NHL	20	2	10	12	2	21	3	3	6	20
1998–99	New York Rangers	NHL	32	0	3	3	38	—	—	—	—	—
1999–2000	Jokerit	SM-l	43	10	13	23	85	11	1	6	7	10
2000–01	Essen Mosquitoes	DEL	46	8	21	29	81	—	—	—	—	—
2004–05	Anyang Halla Winia	ALH	30	8	17	25	58	—	—	—	—	—
NHL totals			877	244	386	630	1,077	186	72	60	132	275
SM-l totals			135	52	69	121	173	14	1	7	8	12

=== International ===
Year	Team	Event	GP	G	A	Pts	PIM
1982	Finland	EJC	5	3	2	5	2
1983	Finland	WJC	7	2	3	5	5
1983	Finland	EJC	5	2	1	3	14
1984	Finland	WJC	7	8	4	12	12
1985	Finland	WJC	7	7	12	19	10
1985	Finland	WC	10	4	5	9	12
1987	Finland	CC	5	0	1	1	6
1989	Finland	WC	8	4	4	8	14
1991	Finland	CC	6	2	2	4	6
1993	Finland	WC	6	0	0	0	2
1996	Finland	WC	1	0	0	0	0
1998	Finland	OLY	6	1	1	2	0
2000	Finland	WC	9	2	1	3	10
Junior totals			31	22	22	44	43
Senior totals			51	13	14	27	50

Awards and achievements
Preceded by Arto Sirviö	Winner of the Matti Keinonen trophy 1984–85	Succeeded by Harry Nikander
Preceded by Saku Koivu	Winner of the President's trophy 1999–2000	Succeeded by Raimo Helminen
