= Dalmazio Santini =

American classical composer

Santini in 1959

Dalmazio Santini (September 11, 1923 – October 4, 2001) was an Italian-born American composer.

== Early life ==
Santini was born in Capestrano in the Abruzzo province of Italy, where he was taught by Franciscan monks. He immigrated to the United States at age 14. He attended public schools in White Plains, New York.

He was inducted into the US Armed Forces and served in World War II, eventually settling in Valhalla, New York. Following the war, the G.I. Bill allowed him the opportunity to study composition at Manhattanville College and the Mannes College of Music. Santini studied composition with Felix Salzer and Tadeusz Kassern, and conducting with Milton Forstat.

== Musical career ==
His first successful composition was a piece entitled "The White Peaks of Forca", which premiered in both live and radio concerts in Italy.

Santini was an experimental composer: he developed a 21-tone system of composition (in contrast to the 12-tone system developed by Schoenberg), and wrote a piece called "Continuum" which uses circular notation, so that the performer decides where to start and end in the piece.

Despite his avant-garde work, Santini also composed many pieces for orchestra and chorus with a traditional classical base; these were performed in New York in Steinway Hall and by the Westchester Symphony Orchestra, and abroad in Italy. In his later years, he returned to his Roman Catholic faith and composed several liturgical pieces, including the "Magnificat" written for the 1992 Incontri di Musica Sacra Contemporanea festival in Rome, Italy, and "Ave Maria", which he said was written to represent his frustration at being away from God and his joy at returning to the church.

== Retirement and death ==
Santini retired to Cape Coral, Florida in 1986, although he continued composing there. He died in nearby Fort Myers on October 4, 2001, at the age of 78.
