= Tyler Riggs =

American filmmaker (born 1986)

- Born: February 25, 1986 (age 40); Tampa, Florida, U.S.
- Spouse: Suvi Koponen (m. 2012)
- Modeling information
- Height: 6 ft 1 in (1.85 m)
- Hair color: Dark brown
- Eye color: Blue
- Agency: DNA Models (New York); Success Models (Paris); Fashion Model Management (Milan); Next Management (Los Angeles) (mother agency)

Tyler Riggs (born February 25, 1986) is an American filmmaker, actor, musician, and model. He is also a philanthropist and entrepreneur who has successfully launched innovative ventures.

== Modeling career ==
His career in modeling began by accident when he posed for a class project for his friend, a photography student. The friend's teacher suggested that Riggs pursue an actual career in modeling, and in 2007, Riggs signed with Red Model Management and moved to New York City. Since then, Riggs has been featured as an "exciting new face" and "model of the week" by Models.com. He was ranked seventh on Forbes' June 2009 list of the most successful male models. He has also been featured as a style inspiration on the New York Times style blog The Moment. Riggs debuted at Gaetano Navarra in Milan during Milan Fashion Week F/W 2008-2009 and opened his first show - Neil Barrett. Since then, he has walked the runway for the most important brands and designers like Alessandro Dell'Acqua, Alexander McQueen, Costume National, DKNY, Givenchy, Gucci, Hermès, Kenzo, Louis Vuitton, Marni, Moschino, and Thierry Mugler. He appeared on the cover of Sportswear International, GQ Style Russia, as a contributing editor and inside magazines such as Wonderland, V, VMAN, Another Man, Details, i-D, Numero Homme, L'Officiel Hommes, GQ and 10+ Magazine, as well as in print ad campaigns for Louis Vuitton, D&G, Topman, Ray-Ban, Diesel, Sisley, Bershka, Raoul Fashion, William Rast for Target, and Converse by John Varvatos.

== Acting career ==
He studied acting under acting teacher William Esper at the William Esper Studio.

== Personal life ==
Riggs is originally from Lutz, near Tampa, Florida. He writes and records music. He is married to Finnish model, Suvi Koponen.

== Filmography ==
| Year | Title | Role | Notes |
|---|---|---|---|
| 2010 | Lulu at the Ace Hotel | Paul | |
| 2012 | The Truth in Being Right | Frankie/Jimmy/Ted | |
| 2013 | Angels in Stardust | Mickey | |
| 2014 | Thinspiration | Brendan | |
| 2018 | Forever My Girl | Jake | |
