= Tim O'Donnell (director) =

American television director

- Born: October 28, 1948; Los Angeles, California, U.S.
- Died: July 27, 2026 (aged 77); Glendale, California, U.S.
- Occupations: Television director, producer and writer
- Years active: 1982–2026

Tim O'Donnell was an American television director, producer and writer.

He began his career as a writer, writing episodes of Gloria, Diff'rent Strokes, Growing Pains and Just the Ten of Us. He made his directorial debut with the television series Home Free starring Matthew Perry, a series he co-created with Richard Gurman. He also directed episodes of Dave's World, Clueless, The Amanda Show, Lizzie McGuire, Phil of the Future, Flight 29 Down and the internet series Woke Up Dead.

O'Donnell created Uncle Buck, which lasted one season. In 1992, he signed a deal with Paramount Television.

O'Donnell died on July 27, 2026 at age 77.
