= Tadeusz Kassern =

Polish composer

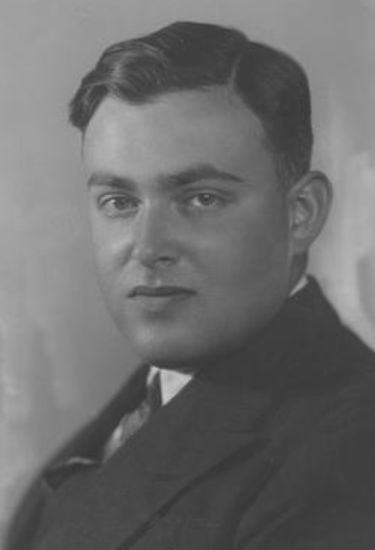

Tadeusz Zygfryd Kassern (Lemberg, Austro-Hungarian Empire, 19 March 1904 – New York City (United States), 2 May 1957) was a Polish composer of Jewish origin.

Born in Lemburg, he studied at the conservatory of the Polish Music Society in Lviv and later at the conservatory in Poznań. He studied composition with Mieczysław Sołtys and piano with Jerzy Lalewicz. In addition, he had a law degree from the University of Poznan. During the war, Kassern lived in Lviv, Cracow and Warsaw. In the Nazi occupied parts of Poland Kassern was using false identity papers to protect himself from the Gestapo. In the post-war years, he served as a cultural attaché in New York to the new Polish government. In 1948 Kassern, after a brief visit to the communist-ruled Poland, suddenly resigned his position, renounced his Polish citizenship and applied for US asylum. Kassern's application for asylum was denied due to missing a deadline set for asylum seekers; depressed, he attempted suicide. He worked for the Third Street Music School Settlement and the Dalcroze School of Music in New York City.
Among his compositions are three operas, symphonic suite "Tatry", solo concertos for flute, piano, oboe and double bass, cantatas, songs with piano accompaniment, and several solo piano works. Kassern died of cancer in 1957.

Among Kassern's well known students was the Italian-born American composer Dalmazio Santini (1923-2001).

== Sources ==
- World of Quotes
- KASSERN IS DEAD
