= Sayeed Shahidi =

American actor and model (born 2003)

- Born: February 14, 2003 (age 23); Saint Paul, Minnesota, U.S.
- Occupations: Actor, model
- Years active: 2008–present
- Relatives: Yara Shahidi (sister); Nas (cousin)

Sayeed Shahidi (born February 14, 2003) is an American actor and model.

== Early life ==
Shahidi was born in St. Paul, Minnesota and is of Iranian, African-American and Choctaw heritage. His mother Keri Salter Shahidi is African-American, whereas his father Afshin Shahidi is Iranian. He lived in St. Paul, Minnesota until age two, then moved to Glendale, California. Sayeed is an Iranian name meaning "Blessing" or "Blessed"; Shahidi is also a common surname in Iran meaning "witness" in Persian. He is the middle child in the family and is the younger brother of actress Yara Shahidi. He also has a younger brother, Ehsan.

== Career ==
Shahidi starred as the character Miles Russell in the 2016 television series Uncle Buck. He also had a recurring role as the character Will in ABC's television series, Switched at Birth. Shahidi was in a few projects with his sister Yara Shahidi, including the crime thriller movie Alex Cross as Damon Cross, the television series The First Family, and the comedy television series Black-ish as Adonis Culpepper (season 2, episode 17).

== Personal life ==
In February 2017, Shahidi was in a relationship with actress Storm Reid.

== Filmography ==
Year	Name	Role	Type	Notes
2016–2019	Black-ish	Adonis Culpepper	Television	
2016–2017	Switched at Birth	Will Bishop	Television	
2016	Uncle Buck	Miles Russell	Television	Eight episodes.
2016	Donald Trump's The Art of the Deal: The Movie	Kid 3	Made for television movie	
2012	Alex Cross	Damon Cross	Film	
2012–2013	The First Family	Lucas Johnson	Television	22 episodes.
2011	Desperate Housewives	Charlie James	Television	Season 7, episode 13: "I'm Still Here", episode 14: "Flashback", and episode 15: "Farewell Letter"
2010–2011	The Event	David Martinez	Television	
