= Uncle Buck =

1989 film by John Hughes

- Theatrical release poster
- Directed by: John Hughes
- Written by: John Hughes
- Produced by: John Hughes; Tom Jacobson
- Starring: John Candy; Amy Madigan
- Cinematography: Ralf D. Bode
- Edited by: Lou Lombardo; Tony Lombardo; Peck Prior
- Music by: Ira Newborn
- Production company: Hughes Entertainment
- Distributed by: Universal Pictures
- Release date: August 16, 1989
- Running time: 100 minutes
- Country: United States
- Language: English
- Box office: $79.2 million

Uncle Buck is a 1989 American comedy film written and directed by John Hughes. Starring John Candy and Amy Madigan, the film follows Buck (Candy), an irresponsible bachelor who is unexpectedly called upon to care for his brother's three children after a family emergency.

Filmed primarily in and around Chicago, Uncle Buck was the first film Hughes wrote, directed, and produced under his multi-picture agreement with Universal Pictures. Much of the production was based at the vacant New Trier West High School in Northfield, Illinois, where several of the film's interior sets were constructed.

Released by Universal Pictures on August 16, 1989, the film opened at number one at the North American box office, remaining there for four consecutive weeks, and ultimately grossed $79.2 million worldwide. Critical reception was mixed, with reviewers finding the film uneven but generally praising Hughes and the comedic chemistry between Candy and the young cast.

Uncle Buck later inspired two television adaptations, Uncle Buck (1990) and Uncle Buck (2016), as well as the 1991 Malayalam-language remake Uncle Bun.

== Plot ==
Bob and Cindy Russell relocate from Indianapolis to the Chicago suburbs with their three children: rebellious teenager Tia, talkative eight-year-old Miles, and six-year-old Maizy. Tia resents the move and her relationship with her mother is fraught. When Cindy's father suffers a heart attack, Bob and Cindy must travel back to Indianapolis on short notice. Unable to find a suitable babysitter, they reluctantly leave the children in the care of Bob's irresponsible brother, Buck.

Buck is an unemployed bachelor who makes a living by betting on horse racing and indulges in heavy drinking and smoking. His long-term girlfriend, Chanice, wants to settle down and start a family, but Buck wants to retain his freedom and avoid responsibility. Despite never having met Miles and Maizy, Buck quickly bonds with them through his humor and unconventional approach to caregiving, while Tia remains openly hostile and embarrassed by his behavior.

As Buck adjusts to suburban life, he struggles with domestic responsibilities but makes genuine efforts to care for the children. He takes them bowling, defends Maizy from her strict school assistant principal, and throws Miles an improvised birthday party, driving off an unreliable clown who arrives late and intoxicated. He also grows suspicious of Tia's boyfriend, Bug, believing he is interested only in having sex with her.

Tensions escalate when Buck interferes with Tia's plans to spend time with Bug. In retaliation, Tia falsely tells Chanice that Buck is having an affair with their flirtatious neighbor, Marcy. When Chanice later sees Buck dancing awkwardly with Marcy, she believes the accusation and ends their relationship. The incident prompts Buck to reflect that the carefree lifestyle others once envied is no longer admired.

When Tia sneaks out, Buck faces a dilemma: attend a high-stakes horse race that could secure his financial future or search for Tia. Worried, he asks Chanice to watch Miles and Maizy while he traces Tia and Bug to a party. There, Buck discovers Bug forcing himself on another girl and binds and gags him, locking him in the trunk of his car. He later finds Tia walking home, upset, and she admits Buck was right about Bug. She and Buck reconcile, with Buck admitting both his failings and his love for Tia. Buck then forces Bug to apologize to Tia before releasing him.

Later, Tia confesses to Chanice that she lied about the alleged affair, telling her that Buck has changed and urging her to give him another chance. Buck and Chanice reconcile, and Buck agrees to take a steady job at her auto shop. When Bob and Cindy return home following Cindy's father's recovery, they find their family dynamics improved. Tia begins repairing her relationship with her mother, while Buck departs on good terms, inviting Tia to visit him in the city before they exchange an affectionate goodbye.

== Cast ==
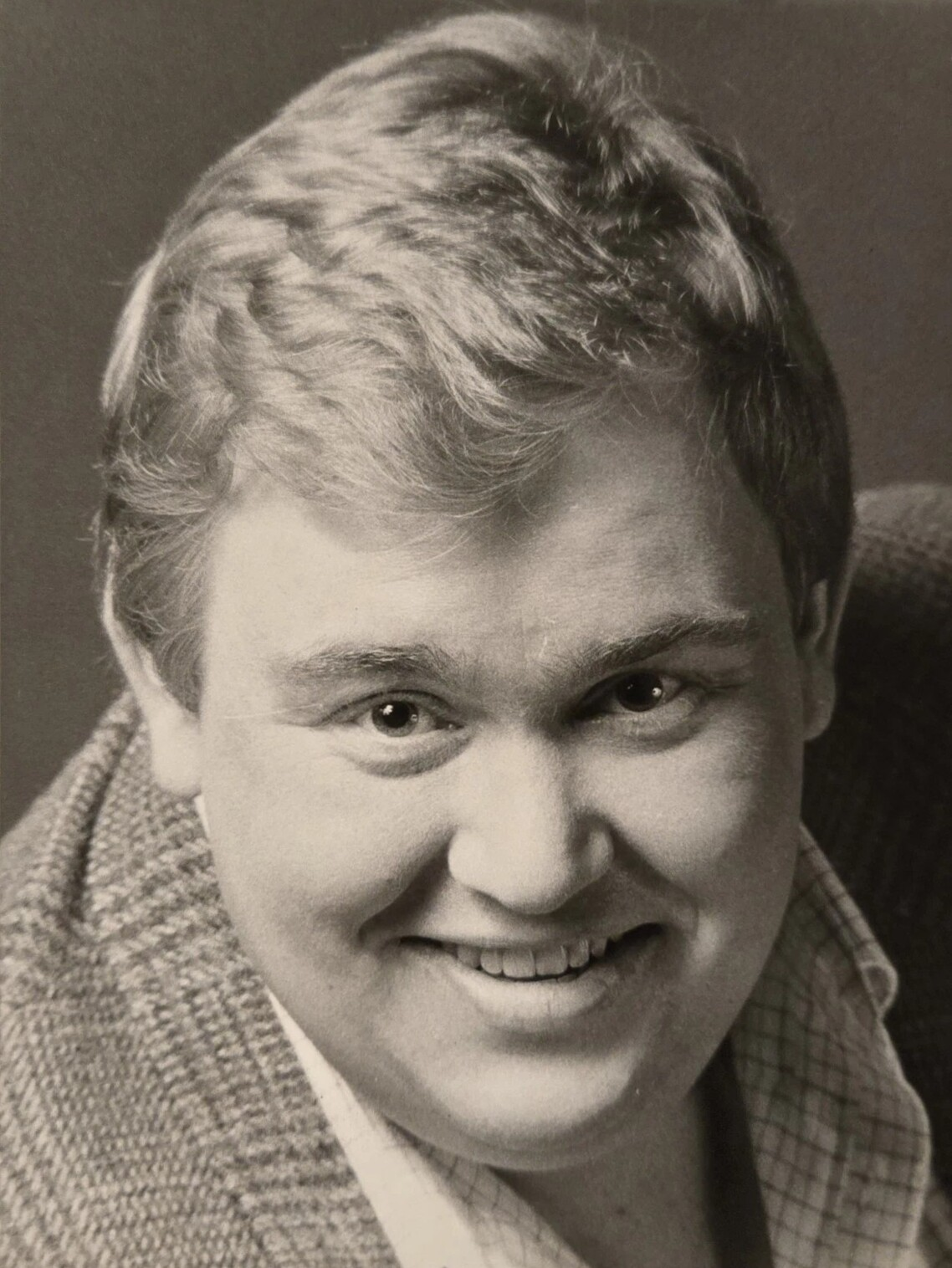
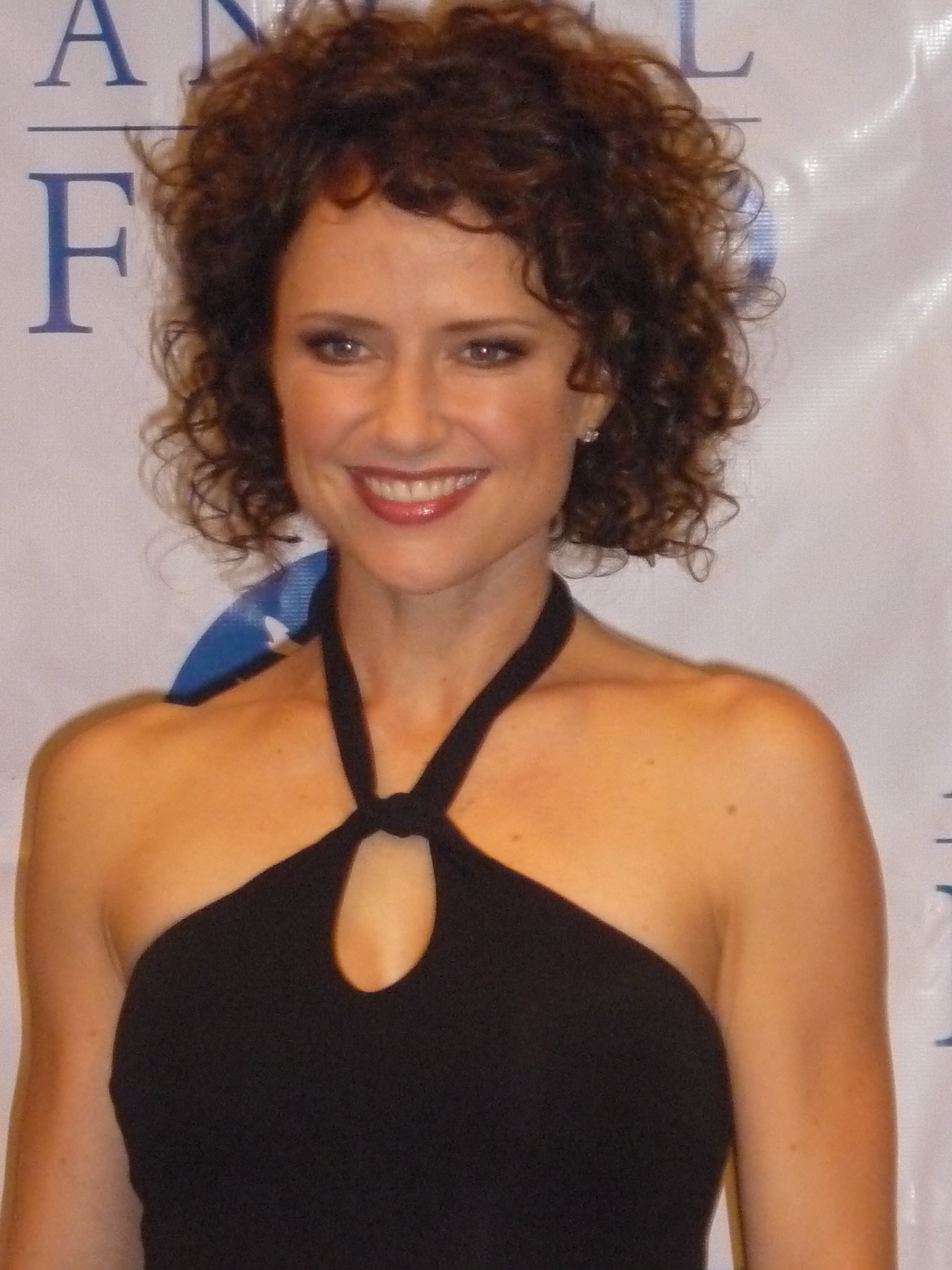
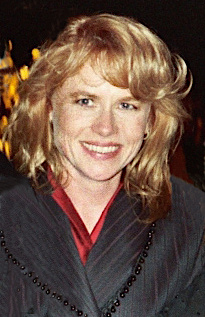
John Candy (pictured in 1982), Jean Louisa Kelly (2009), and Amy Madigan (1989)
- John Candy as Buck Russell, Bob's carefree bachelor brother who reluctantly babysits his children
- Jean Louisa Kelly as Tia Russell, Bob and Cindy's rebellious teenage daughter
- Laurie Metcalf as Marcy Dahlgren-Frost, the Russells' flirtatious neighbor
- Jay Underwood as Bug, Tia's self-centered boyfriend
- Macaulay Culkin as Miles Russell, Bob and Cindy's talkative young son
- Gaby Hoffmann as Maizy Russell, Bob and Cindy's youngest child
- Elaine Bromka as Cindy Russell, Buck's sister-in-law
- Garrett M. Brown as Bob Russell, Buck's older brother
- Amy Madigan as Chanice Kobolowski, Buck's long-term girlfriend and owner of an auto repair shop
- Suzanne Shepherd as Mrs. Anita Hoargarth, the strict assistant principal of Maizy's school
- Mike Starr as Pooter-the-Clown, an intoxicated birthday clown
- Brian Tarantina as E. Roger Coswell, Buck's friend

Uncle Buck also features William Windom as Mr. Hatfield, the unseen neighbor awakened by Buck's noisy arrival, Dennis Cockrum as Pal, Bug's sleazy friend, and Anna Chlumsky as one of Maizy's classmates. Additional voices were provided by Patricia Arquette, Jack Blessing, Leigh French, and Julie Payne.

== Production ==
The film was the first one directed, written, and produced by John Hughes under a multi-picture agreement deal with Universal. Filming began on January 4, 1989, in Chicago. The company decided to keep the production facilities and locations as close as possible. The vacant New Trier High School West campus in Northfield, Illinois, was chosen for the production facility. Three of its gyms were converted into sound stages on which several sets were constructed including the two-levelled interior of the Russell House, Buck's bedroom, and smaller sets. The school was also equipped to suit the needs of the cast and crew behind-the-scenes, with classrooms for the young actors, offices, dressing rooms, a wardrobe department, editing facilities, a special effects shop, equipment storage areas, and a projection booth.

Production designer John Corso began designing the sets in October 1988 and within seven weeks his construction crew of twelve carpenters and five painters began work on the two levels of the Russell house. The elementary school corridor, the boys' restroom, the principal's office, and a classroom were filmed at Wilmette's Romona Elementary School. A colonial-style house in Evanston was chosen for the exterior of the Russell house. The exteriors and practical locations were shot in Chicago, Cicero, Skokie, Northbrook, Wilmette, Winnetka, Glencoe, and Riverwoods.

== Reception ==
=== Box office ===
Uncle Buck was released in the United States and Canada on August 16, 1989. During its opening weekend, it grossed $8.8 million from 1,804 theaters—an average of $4,875 per theater—making it the highest-grossing film of the weekend, ahead of Parenthood ($7.6 million), in its third weekend, and The Abyss ($7.2 million), in its second. In its second weekend, Uncle Buck retained the top position with a gross of $6.7 million, again ahead of Parenthood ($6.4 million) and The Abyss ($4.7 million). It remained number one in its third weekend, over the extended Labor Day holiday weekend, with a gross of $7.8 million, ahead of Parenthood ($7.5 million) and The Abyss ($5.5 million). Overall, Uncle Buck remained the number-one film for four consecutive weeks and among the ten highest-grossing films for nine weeks.

Uncle Buck was the 13th-highest-grossing film of 1989 in the United States and Canada, with a total gross of $66.8 million, ahead of Field of Dreams ($64.4 million), and behind Turner & Hooch ($71.1 million). Outside of the United States and Canada, Uncle Buck is estimated to have earned $12.5 million, giving it a worldwide total gross of $79.3 million.

=== Critical reception ===
On the review aggregator website Rotten Tomatoes, 61% of 28 critics' reviews are positive. The website's consensus reads: "Uncle Buck has its ups and downs, but there's undeniable comedic magic that comes from uniting John Hughes, John Candy, and a house full of precocious kids." Metacritic, which uses a weighted average, assigned the film a score of 51 out of 100, based on 12 critics, indicating "mixed or average" reviews.

Roger Ebert of the Chicago Sun-Times gave the film a score of one and a half out of four, writing that Uncle Buck was unusually bitter and angry for a Hughes movie: "...Hughes is usually the master of the right note, the right line of dialogue, and this time there's an uncomfortable undercurrent in the material".

== Television series and remake ==
A television series was broadcast on CBS in 1990. It starred Kevin Meaney as Buck, a slob who drinks and smokes. When Bob and Cindy die in a car accident, he is named the guardian of Tia, Miles, and Maizy. The show was not received well by TV critics. After it was moved to Friday, in an attempt by CBS to establish a comedy night there, its ratings quickly plummeted and it was cancelled.

In June 2016, ABC premiered a second television adaptation featuring an African-American cast with Mike Epps in the title role, James Lesure as his brother, and Nia Long as Buck's sister-in-law. It suffered a similar fate to that of the previous TV adaptation, as it was poorly received by critics and then cancelled after eight episodes.

In 1991, the film was remade in the Indian Malayalam language and released as Uncle Bun starring Mohanlal.
