= Uncle Buck (2016 TV series) =

- Genre: Sitcom
- Created by: Steven Cragg; Brian Bradley
- Based on: Uncle Buck by John Hughes
- Starring: Mike Epps; James Lesure; Iman Benson; Sayeed Shahidi; Aalyrah Caldwell; Nia Long
- Composer: Chris Alan Lee
- Country of origin: United States
- Original language: English
- No. of seasons: 1
- No. of episodes: 8

Production
- Executive producers: Steven Cragg; Brian Bradley; Will Packer
- Camera setup: Single-camera
- Running time: 30 minutes
- Production companies: Will Packer Productions; Unaccountable Freaks Productions; ABC Signature; Universal Television

Original release
- Network: ABC
- Release: June 14 – July 5, 2016

Related
- Uncle Buck (1989); Uncle Buck (1990–91)

Uncle Buck is an American sitcom based on the 1989 film of the same name that debuted on ABC as an entry in the 2015–16 television season. The series was created for television by Steven Cragg and Brian Bradley. The show was picked up to series on May 8, 2015 and aired from June 14 to July 5, 2016.

On July 6, 2016, ABC cancelled the series after one season.

== Cast and characters ==
- Mike Epps as Buck Russell
- James Lesure as Will Russell, Buck's older brother
- Iman Benson as Tia Russell, Will & Alexis's daughter and Buck's paternal niece
- Sayeed Shahidi as Miles Russell, Will & Alexis's son and Buck's paternal nephew
- Aalyrah Caldwell as Maizy Russell, Will & Alexis's daughter and Buck's paternal niece
- Nia Long as Alexis Smith-Russell, Will's wife and Buck's sister-in-law

== Reception ==
Uncle Buck received generally negative reviews from critics. On Rotten Tomatoes, the series holds an approval rating of 30%, based on 20 critics, with an average rating of 4.28/10. The site's critical consensus reads: "Despite the efforts of a charming cast, Uncle Buck is a painfully predictable adaptation without enough laughs". On Metacritic, the series has a score of 37 out of 100, based on 15 critics, indicating "generally unfavorable reviews".

== Episodes ==
No.	Title	Directed by	Written by	Original release date	Prod. code	US viewers (millions)
1	"Pilot"	Phil Traill	Steven Cragg & Brian D. Bradley	June 14, 2016	101	4.96
2	"Li'l Scarface"	Stan Lathan	Kenny Smith	June 14, 2016	103	4.96
3	"Ride Along"	Fred Goss	Steven Cragg & Brian D. Bradley	June 21, 2016	102	3.47
4	"Brothers"	Ryan Case	David Hemingson	June 21, 2016	105	3.47
5	"Going to Jail Party"	Reginald Hudlin	Michael Pennie	June 28, 2016	104	3.65
6	"I Got This"	Reginald Hudlin	Alyson Fouse	June 28, 2016	106	3.65
7	"The Interrogation"	Ken Whittingham	Steven Cragg & Brian D. Bradley	July 5, 2016	108	3.23
8	"Block Party"	Victor Nelli Jr.	Regina Hicks	July 5, 2016	107	3.23
