= Valhalla High School (New York) =

Location
- 300 Columbus Avenue; Valhalla, New York 10595; United States
- Coordinates: 41°05′28″N 73°46′33″W

Information
- Type: Public High School
- Established: 1953
- School district: Valhalla Union Free School District
- Superintendent: Kevin McLeod
- Principal: Kristen Sautner
- Faculty: 40.58 (FTE)
- Grades: 9-12
- Enrollment: 425 (2020–21)
- Student to teacher ratio: 10.47
- Campus: Suburban
- Colors: Maroon and White
- Athletics: Section 1 (NYSPHSAA)
- Nickname: Vikings
- Rival: Westlake High School, Briarcliff High School, Pleasantville High School
- Accreditation: Board of Regents of the University of the State of New York
- Website: Official website

Valhalla High School is a public high school located in Valhalla, New York. The school serves about 500 students in grades 9 to 12 in the Valhalla Union Free School District.

== Distinctions ==
Valhalla High School is a National Blue Ribbon School under the National Blue Ribbon Schools Program of the U.S. Department of Education.

The average SAT score of Valhalla High School students is 1230 (610 math, 620 reading and writing). That’s around the 84th percentile nationwide, and well above the national average. Valhalla High School received an overall grade of A− from school ranking and review site Niche.com.

College acceptances for the recent Valhalla High School graduating classes include Binghamton University, Boston College, Boston University, Bucknell University, Colgate University, Columbia University, Cornell University, Dartmouth College, Drexel University, Duke University, Fordham University, George Washington University, Hofstra University, Johns Hopkins University, McGill University, New York University, Northeastern University, Rensselaer Polytechnic Institute, Rutgers University, Seton Hall, Stony Brook University, University of California - San Diego, University of Hartford, University of Massachusetts-Amherst, University of Miami, University of Michigan, University of Notre Dame, University of Texas-Austin, The United States Military Academy at West Point, Villanova University, the University of Wisconsin-Madison, Wesleyan University and Worcester Polytechnic Institute.

== Athletics and student clubs ==
Athletics at Valhalla High School include Basketball, Football, Tennis, Soccer, Volleyball, Wrestling, Lacrosse, Track and Baseball. The Valhalla Vikings' championship titles include the 1996 New York State Football Championship, the 2010 New York State Baseball Championship and the 2019 New York State Volleyball Championship.

Valhalla High School offers various student clubs, including the Academic Challenge Club, the Book Club, the Debate Club, the Environmental Club, the Human Rights Club, the National Honor Society and the World Language Honor Society.

Valhalla's very popular Drama Society produces an annual fall drama and spring musical. Recent productions include The Crucible, It's a Wonderful Life and Twelve Angry Jurors.

== Notable alumni ==
- Keefe Cato (class of 1976), professional baseball player
- Kevin Meaney (class of 1974), stand-up comedian and actor, who starred in the movie "Big" with Tom Hanks and appeared on The Tonight Show, Late Night with David Letterman, Live! with Regis and Kathie Lee, The Oprah Winfrey Show and Conan.
- Frank Pace (class of 1968), TV producer and writer, with more than 700 episodes of network television to his credit (including Suddenly Susan and Murphy Brown).
- Keith St. John (class of 1975), lawyer and politician, who is the first openly gay African American elected to public office in the United States.
