= Suvi Koponen =

Finnish fashion model (born 1988)

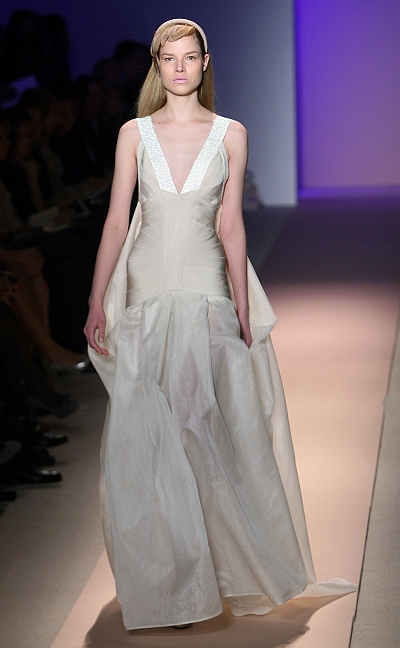
- Koponen in February 2008
- Born: Suvi Maria Koponen; 26 March 1988 (age 38); Vantaa, Finland
- Spouse: Tyler Riggs (m. 2012)
- Modeling information
- Height: 1.80 m (5 ft 11 in)
- Hair color: Blonde
- Eye color: Hazel
- Agency: DNA Models (New York); VIVA Model Management (Paris, Barcelona); Next Model Management (Milan, London, Los Angeles); IMM Bruxelles (Brussels); Mega Model Agency (Hamburg); Paparazzi Model Management (Helsinki); Stockholmsgruppen (Stockholm); Chic Management

Suvi Maria Riggs (née Koponen; born 26 March 1988) is a Finnish fashion model who rose to fame after winning the 2005 Mallikoulu ("Model School") contest in Finland.

She has worked for numerous designers including Anna Sui, Vera Wang, Marc Jacobs, Donna Karan, Anne Klein, Blumarine, Miu Miu, BCBG Max Azria, Calvin Klein, Louis Vuitton, Nina Ricci and Prada. Koponen has also had an editorial in the French Vogue shot by David Sims. Koponen has also appeared in the American Vogue and made the cover of Vogue Portugal in March 2008.

== Career ==
In 2005, Koponen won the televised Mallikoulu ("Model School") contest. Of the show she won a model contract with international top Model Agency Women in Milan, Paris and New York. Koponen made her runway debut at the major Fashion Weeks during the Fall/Winter 06/07 runway season, but it was not until the following season that she truly broke out, walking exclusively for Prada and Miu Miu. Paul Rowland, the founder of Supreme (part of Women NY), met Suvi for the first time in New York City. He designed a unique hairstyle for her and famously told Miuccia Prada: "I have got a new star for you." She was also on the cover of Finnish magazine Pàp in November 2005 and also in 2006. Later the same year, she appeared on the cover of Amica magazine (Germany) and in print ads for Anteprime. After 2006, Koponen became recognised internationally.

In 2007, Koponen appeared in five editorials for French, British, Italian, and American Vogue. She became the face of Balenciaga's fall campaign and replaced Natalia Vodianova as the face of the Calvin Klein collection. In February 2007, she walked the runways for Chanel, Hermès, Jil Sander, and Nina Ricci, among others. She appeared on the cover of French Vogue Beaute and opened the Jill Stuart, Marc by Marc Jacobs, and Marni fashion shows and closed the Nina Ricci show in Paris. She appeared on the cover of Dazed & Confused in April 2007. In fall 2007, she became the face of Blumarine's spring ad-campaign alongside Bette Franke and starred in the Mulberry fall ad-campaign alongside Caroline Trentini. In fall 2008, Koponen was the face of Calvin Klein in a campaign shot by Fabien Baron.

In August 2007, New York Magazine chose "The Top Ten Models to Watch This Fashion Week" and placed Koponen on third.

In September 2007, she was named one of British Vogue's "Head Girls," a model to watch out for in the upcoming season. She also opened the Reem Acra spring show in New York City and closed the Carolina Herrera, Jill Stuart and DKNY spring shows in New York. Later that month, she opened the Alberta Ferretti, Anna Molinari, Fendi and Just Cavalli shows in Milan and closed the Alberta Ferretti, Alessandro Dell'Acqua and Roberto Cavalli shows also in Milan.

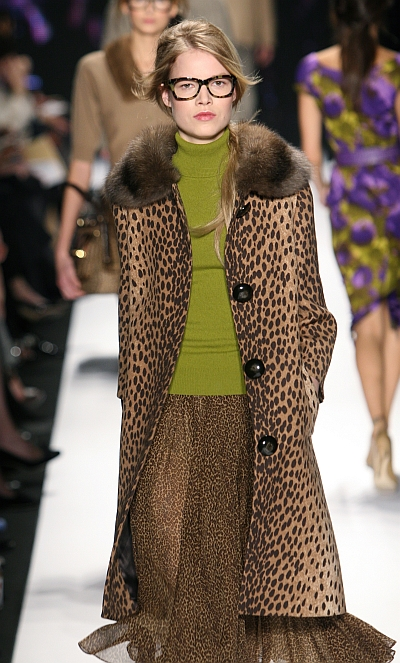
Suvi Koponen in Michael Kors.

She is signed with the model agencies Next (New York), Women Model Management (Milan and Paris), Premier (London), Paparazzi (Helsinki), Stockholmsgruppen Models 2pm management (Copenhagen) and IMM - International Model Management.

In February 2008, MTV3 aired a documentary about her and Koponen said that she doesn't "care about weight things, but it's more important to me that I'm happy, and I feel good. What happens to my body is going to happen and people have to live with that, or I'll quit this job." Koponen also became the face of Blumarine again.

=== Personal life ===
Koponen has "5" tattooed in the middle of her back, both the number of people in her family and her lucky number. She also has the text "imported" tattooed under her chest, three lines on her left wrist and "Cat" on her right hand, which stands for her model friend, Catherine McNeil.

To prepare for fashion week, she said, "I slept! A lot! It's just really important to get a lot of rest. I have to mentally prepare myself, too. I have to be like, 'Suvi, it's only a month. You'll be ok.' That really helps."

Her favorite place is the Maldives, where she shot a British Vogue editorial.

Koponen is married to model turned actor Tyler Riggs. She currently resides in Sherman Oaks, California.
