= Kevin Meaney =

American actor (1956–2016)

- Born: Kevin Gerard Meaney; April 23, 1956; White Plains, New York, U.S.
- Died: October 21, 2016 (aged 60); Forestburgh, New York, U.S.
- Resting place: Mount Calvary Cemetery, White Plains
- Spouses: Leanne S. Fader (m. 1995; ann. 1995); Mary Ann Halford (m. 1997; div. 2008)
- Children: 1

Comedy career
- Years active: 1980–2016
- Medium: Stand-up, television, film

Kevin Gerard Meaney (April 23, 1956 – October 21, 2016) was an American stand-up comedian and actor.

== Early life ==
Meaney graduated from Valhalla High School in Valhalla in Westchester County, New York, and attended the State University of New York at Morrisville.

== Career ==
Meaney began his career in comedy in 1980, moving first to San Francisco and then later to Boston where he continued to develop his act. He appeared on the A&E television series An Evening at the Improv, in 1982.

Meaney had a show called the Sweeney and Meaney Hour at Stitches Comedy Club in Boston. A couple of appearances on Star Search gave Meaney the opportunity to test his act on national syndicated television. His big break into mainstream culture may be considered to be his first HBO comedy special in 1986, followed by an appearance on the December 20, 1986, episode of Saturday Night Live as a special guest. Meaney made his debut performance on The Tonight Show Starring Johnny Carson in 1987.

After that, his act was broadcast several times by HBO, Comedy Central and several network television appearances on The Tonight Show, Late Night with David Letterman, Live! with Regis and Kathie Lee, The Oprah Winfrey Show and Conan.

His most famous catchphrase was "That's not right!," delivered while doing an impression of his mother, which was followed by, and usually preceded by, her complaints and remonstrations. Typically, his act consisted of commentary about his family and complaints about hotel service. Meaney at times closed his show with a rendition of the 1985 song "We Are the World" which included comical impressions of the various singers who originally sang the song.

He often ended his performance with a few jokes that intentionally would not get a good response to follow them up with a song reminiscent of "I Don't Care" by Jean Lenox and Harry O. Sutton sung about how he does not care whether the audience laughs at his jokes.

Meaney was involved in a number of television programs, including Ned & Stacey, Dr. Katz, Space Ghost Coast to Coast, Garfield and Friends, Rocko's Modern Life, London Underground, and Duckman. He starred as the title character on the short-lived sitcom version of Uncle Buck.

He was also a singer and musician, writing and producing songs for HBO and Comedy Central with his co-writer Martin Olson, with whom he wrote several television series. He intermittently appeared on The Jay Thomas Show as a co-host. In 1996, he wrote and performed a one-man play titled Vegas Vows based loosely on his brief marriage to a woman he had just met.

In the 2000s, Meaney performed in various roles in the Broadway musical Hairspray.

== Personal life ==
Meaney was born the third child of five in White Plains, New York. When he was 39 years old, he married a woman he had just met in Las Vegas. The marriage was annulled shortly afterward. He later married television executive Mary Ann Halford and they had one daughter.

In 2002, Meaney was arrested at the San Francisco International Airport. After his wife set off a metal detector and lifted her shirt high enough to expose her bra, he reportedly got belligerent and was asked twice not to film the security operations of the terminal. A scuffle with police ensued.

On XM Satellite Radio's "Stand Up Sit Down" on May 5, 2008, Meaney stated publicly that he was gay. He explained that his time on Broadway was where he gained the courage to accept his homosexuality. Soon after, he and his wife divorced.

== Death ==
Meaney died on October 21, 2016, at age 60, after being found unresponsive in his home in Forestburgh, New York. According to Eastern Daily News he died from a heart attack.

== Discography ==
- That's Not Right (2004)

== Filmography ==
=== Features ===
- Big (1988)
- Plump Fiction (1998)
- The Brave Little Toaster to the Rescue (1997)
- Shut Up and Kiss Me (2004)
- Heterosexuals (2010)
- Blood Ransom (2014)

=== Television ===
- Saturday Night Live (1986)
- CBS Summer Playhouse (1988)
- The Tonight Show Starring Johnny Carson (1989)
- Uncle Buck (1990)
- The Jackie Thomas Show (1993)
- Space Ghost Coast to Coast (1994)
- Garfield and Friends (1994)
- Duckman (1994)
- Ned and Stacey (1995)
- Dr. Katz, Professional Therapist (1995)
- Rocko's Modern Life (1996)
- Brotherly Love (1997)
- The Tom Show (1997)
- Beyond Belief: Fact or Fiction (1998)
- Penn & Teller's Sin City Spectacular (1998)
- Mad Jack the Pirate (1998)
- The Nightmare Room (2002)
- 30 Rock (2010)
- 2 Broke Girls (2015)
- Gotham Comedy Live (2014)
- Hidden America with Jonah Ray (2016)
