= Uncle Buck (1990 TV series) =

- The characters of Uncle Buck.
- Genre: Sitcom
- Based on: Characters by John Hughes
- Developed by: Tim O'Donnell
- Directed by: James Widdoes; John Tracy; Art Dielhenn
- Starring: Kevin Meaney; Dah-ve Chodan; Jacob Gelman; Lacey Chabert; Audrey Meadows; Dennis Cockrum; Thomas Mikal Ford
- Opening theme: "Uncle Buck" performed by Ronnie Milsap
- Composer: Steve Dorff
- Country of origin: United States
- Original language: English
- No. of seasons: 1
- No. of episodes: 22 (6 unaired)

Production
- Executive producer: Richard Gurman
- Producer: Rick Newberger
- Camera setup: Multi-camera
- Running time: 30 minutes (inc. commercials)
- Production companies: Verbatim Productions; Universal Television

Original release
- Network: CBS
- Release: September 10, 1990 – March 9, 1991

Related
- Uncle Buck

Uncle Buck is an American surreal humour television series starring Kevin Meaney, based on the 1989 film of the same name. The series aired on CBS from September 10, 1990 to March 9, 1991 during the 1990–91 season.

== Synopsis ==
Buck Russell is a slacker, who drinks, smokes, and gambles. He is also the uncle of his brother Bob's children Tia, Maizy, and Miles. One day, Buck is named the guardian of Tia, Maizy, and Miles after Bob and Cindy are suddenly killed in a car accident. Buck is sometimes assisted in raising his nieces and nephew by their maternal grandmother Maggie Hogoboom.

== Cast ==
- Kevin Meaney as Buck Russell (the paternal uncle of Tia, Miles & Maizy)
- Dah-ve Chodan as Tia Russell, Buck's paternal niece and Maggie's maternal granddaughter
- Jacob Gelman as Miles Russell, Buck's paternal nephew and Maggie's maternal grandson
- Sarah Martineck as Maizy Russell, Buck's paternal niece and Maggie's maternal granddaughter
- Audrey Meadows as Maggie Hogoboom (the maternal grandmother of Tia, Miles & Maizy)

== Episodes ==
NOTE: The production codes were taken from the United States Copyright Office.

No.	Title	Directed by	Written by	Original release date	Prod. code	Viewers (millions)
1	"Pilot"	John Tracy	Tim O'Donnell	September 10, 1990	83559	16.1
2	"Nine-to-Five"	James Widdoes	John Hughes	September 17, 1990	66702	19.6
3	"The Gray Fox"	James Widdoes	Tim O'Donnell & Richard Gurman	September 24, 1990	66705	18.1
4	"Cub Fever"	James Widdoes	Rick Newberger	October 1, 1990	66703	16.1
5	"Buck to School"	Art Dielhenn	Kevin Abbott	October 8, 1990	66704	15.8
6	"Yes, But Will It Fly?"	James Widdoes	John Hughes	October 15, 1990	66706	16.6
7	"Teacher's Pet"	Art Dielhenn	Warren Bell	October 22, 1990	66707	17.6
8	"Fire Sale"	Unknown	Unknown	November 5, 1990	66708	17.7
9	"Tia's Tutor"	Unknown	Unknown	November 12, 1990	66711	17.8
10	"A Day at the Races"	Unknown	Unknown	November 16, 1990	66710	9.6
11	"Bluebell Buck"	Unknown	Unknown	November 23, 1990	66701	8.3
12	"In Tia We Trust"	Unknown	Unknown	January 26, 1991	66712	9.7
13	"Pig-malion"	Unknown	Unknown	February 2, 1991	66715	10.6
14	"Buck to the Future"	Unknown	Unknown	February 9, 1991	66721	7.9
15	"Movin' Out"	Unknown	Unknown	March 2, 1991	66709	8.7
16	"The People's Half Court"	Unknown	Unknown	March 9, 1991	66714	6.9
17	"The Music Man"	N/A	N/A	Unaired	66716	N/A
18	"Fame"	N/A	N/A	Unaired	66713	N/A
19	"Sixty Candles"	N/A	N/A	Unaired	66717	N/A
20	"My Right Foot"	N/A	N/A	Unaired	66718	N/A
21	"Danny"	N/A	N/A	Unaired	66719	N/A
22	"The Big Picture"	N/A	N/A	Unaired	66720	N/A

== Critical reception ==
The show was panned by critics. The pilot caused a minor controversy because of a scene where Maizy tells Uncle Buck: "You suck!"; this is believed to be the first time this phrase had been used on network television. After airing on Monday nights for two months, due to competition with MacGyver and The Fresh Prince of Bel-Air, the latter of which premiered on the same day, it was moved to Friday, in an attempt by CBS to establish a comedy night swapping with Evening Shade. The ratings dropped from there with strong competition from ABC's Top 20 hit Full House, and it was cancelled shortly after, having aired only 16 episodes and leaving several filmed episodes unaired.
