= Edward Serlin House =

- Location within New York

General information
- Type: House
- Architectural style: Usonian
- Location: Pleasantville, New York
- Coordinates: 41.126189°N 73.746089°W
- Construction started: 1949

Design and construction
- Architect: Frank Lloyd Wright

Edward Serlin House was completed in 1949, and is the second of three designs by Frank Lloyd Wright for Usonia, planned as a cooperative community starting in the late 1940s. The community is now known as the Usonia Historic District and is located in Pleasantville, New York. The community was listed on the National Register of Historic Places in 2012.

The home has three bedrooms, two bathrooms, and is on a five-foot square module, with a shed roof over the living room. Construction was supervised by former Wright apprentice, David Henken, with additions to the design made by Aaron L. Resnick.

== See also ==
- List of Frank Lloyd Wright works
