= Platinum Moon =

American rock band

- Origin: Katonah, New York
- Genres: Hard rock, Rock, Heavy Metal, Pop rock, Pop-Punk
- Years active: 2018–present
- Website: platinummoonband.com

Platinum Moon is an American rock band based in Katonah, New York.

Since 2024, Platinum Moon has expanded their live presence with tours across the Northeastern United States and Canada, including support slots with artists such as All Time Low, Train, and X Ambassadors. In 2025, they won first place at the Bitter Jester Music Festival, and they are scheduled to perform at the 2026 Welcome to Rockville festival in Daytona Beach, Florida.

== History ==
The band was formed in 2018 by brothers Anton (guitar and violin) and Joseph Klettner (keyboards and guitar). They were joined by singer AvA Anduze, whom they contacted after watching her perform in a YouTube video, and drummer Ethan Grosman, who was found through a local drum instructor. All were teens. Calvin Strothenke was the original bassist, who was later replaced by Toby Dorfman in the following years. In addition to the songwriting done by the Klettner brothers, who have classical training, AvA, a songwriting major, also contributed a lot to the band's original writing. She cites classic rock artists such as Fleetwood Mac and The Eagles as influences, and describes the band's style as "Modern rock influenced by classic rock, with a little bit of alternative and blues influences". In 2019, a local journalist compared the band's style to Janis Joplin, Blondie and Led Zeppelin. The band initially promoted itself by posting covers online. During the COVID-19 pandemic, they used the downtime to intensify their social media activities.

The band won first place at the 2019 Connecticut's Got Talent competition. Since then, they have performed at venues across the East Coast, and at various festivals, including The Big E, Pleasantville Music Festival (opening for X Ambassadors), and the Mazzstock festival. In 2025, they won the Bitter Jester Music Festival."

The band has released two albums, Wild Minds (2019; self-produced) and Under the Riptide, and an EP, Friction (2023).

Following the release of their 2023 EP Friction, Platinum Moon increased their touring activity, embarking on a Northeast summer tour in 2024 that included stops in New York, Toronto, Vermont, Massachusetts, and Connecticut. The band headlined shows and supported established acts across the Eastern United States and Canada, sharing stages with All Time Low, Train, and X Ambassadors. Notable 2024 performances included dates in Cincinnati, Ohio (July 31), Louisville, Kentucky (August 1), and Baltimore, Maryland (June 10, 2024).In 2025, Platinum Moon continued their momentum with additional U.S. dates, including openings for Marty Friedman and Nikki Stringfield in Westland, Michigan (January 31), and Liliac in Lakewood, Ohio (March 6). They also released singles "We Need Therapy" (March 22, 2024), "Hold The Gun" (November 24, 2024), "The Pills" (August 8, 2025), and "I AM" (September 12, 2025), further building anticipation for live sets. A highlight of the year was their participation in the Bitter Jester Music Festival, a Chicagoland battle-of-the-bands competition for emerging artists under 24. Selected from over 100 applicants, Platinum Moon advanced to the grand finale on June 28 in Highland Park, Illinois, where they won first place, earning cash prizes, professional recordings, and the title of Grand Champion. The victory provided opportunities for future showcases, including a potential opening slot at Ravinia Festival.Looking ahead, Platinum Moon is booked for the 2026 edition of Welcome to Rockville, a major rock festival at Daytona International Speedway in Daytona Beach, Florida, scheduled for May 7–10. The event features over 160 bands across five stages, headlined by acts including Foo Fighters, Guns N' Roses, My Chemical Romance, and Bring Me the Horizon. This appearance marks a significant milestone, aligning with the festival's record-breaking growth and Platinum Moon's rising profile in the rock scene.

== Personnel ==
=== Current members ===
- Anton Klettner (guitar, violin) (2018–present)
- Joseph Klettner (piano, guitar) (2018–present)
- Ethan Grosman (drums) (2018–present)
- AvA Anduze (vocals) (2018–present)
- Toby Dorfman (bass) (2022–present)

=== Former members ===
- Calvin Strothenke (bass) (2018?-2022?)

=== Touring ===
Platinum Moon has performed extensively across the Eastern United States and Canada, focusing on high-energy live shows that blend classic rock influences with modern pop hooks. Early tours emphasized regional festivals and competitions, but since 2024, they have headlined multi-city runs and supported major acts.

==== Selected Tour Dates ====
Date	City	Venue	Notes
2024-06-10	Baltimore, MD	Baltimore Soundstage	Headliner.
2024-07-31	Cincinnati, OH	Spring Grove Community Room	Headliner; Northeast Summer Tour.
2024-08-01	Louisville, KY	Priceless Occasions Events and More	Headliner; Northeast Summer Tour.
2025-01-31	Westland, MI	The Token Lounge	Opening for Marty Friedman and Nikki Stringfield.
2025-02-21	Winchester, VA	Backseat Events	Opening for Liliac with Nero’s Fiddle.
2025-02-22	Annapolis, MD	Rams Head On Stage	Opening for Liliac.
2025-02-25	Clifton, NJ	Dingbatz	Support for Very Best.
2025-03-03	Québec, QC	L'Anti Bar & Spectacles	Headliner; Single release show for "We Need Therapy".
2025-03-06	Lakewood, OH	Winchester Music Tavern	Opening for Liliac.
2025-05-15	Knoxville, TN	Open Chord	Headliner; Regional tour stop.
2025-06-28	Highland Park, IL	Port Clinton Square	Winners/Headliners; Grand Finale of Bitter Jester Music Festival (1st place, $2,000 prize, Ravinia showcase opportunity).
2025-09-26	Rockford, IL	Hard Rock Live - Rockford	Opening for Here Come the Mummies with Lachy Doley (Mummfest Tour).
2025-10-16	Wilmington, NC	Wilson Center at Cape Fear Community College	Headliner; East Coast fall tour.
2025-10-17	Charlotte, NC	Neighborhood Theatre	Opening for Here Come the Mummies with Lachy Doley (Mummfest Tour).
2025-10-26	Falls Church, VA	The State Theatre	Opening for Here Come the Mummies with Lachy Doley (Mummfest Tour).
2025-11-07	Fort Wayne, IN	The Clyde Theatre	Opening for Here Come the Mummies with Lachy Doley (Mummfest Tour).
2025-11-09	Detroit, MI	Saint Andrew’s Hall	Opening for Here Come the Mummies with Lachy Doley (Mummfest Tour).
2026-05-07	Daytona Beach, FL	Daytona International Speedway	Festival appearance; Welcome to Rockville (multi-stage event with 160+ bands; headliners Foo Fighters, Guns N' Roses, My Chemical Romance, Bring Me the Horizon; specific day 2026-05-08 (Friday, 12:50 P.M.).

Additional 2025 dates include support appearances on The Mummfest Tour with Here Come the Mummies (e.g., October 26 in Falls Church, VA; November 9 in Detroit, MI) and openings for X Ambassadors in select Northeastern markets. The band's 2025 schedule features over 25 U.S. and Canadian performances, emphasizing high-energy sets from their Friction EP and recent singles.

== Discography ==
=== Studio albums ===
Title	Release date
Wild Minds	October 12, 2019
Under the Riptide	September 24, 2021
Friction (Note: Classified as an EP)	June 23, 2023

=== Singles ===
Title	Release date
Dark Knight	October 31, 2020
All We Ever Do	February 27, 2021
Your Toxins	March 4, 2022
Lockdown NRG	October 28, 2022
We Need Therapy	March 22, 2024
Hold The Gun	November 24, 2024
The Pills	August 8, 2025
I AM	September 12, 2025
Table for Three	March 6, 2026
