= Mel Smilow =

American furniture designer (1922 - 2002)

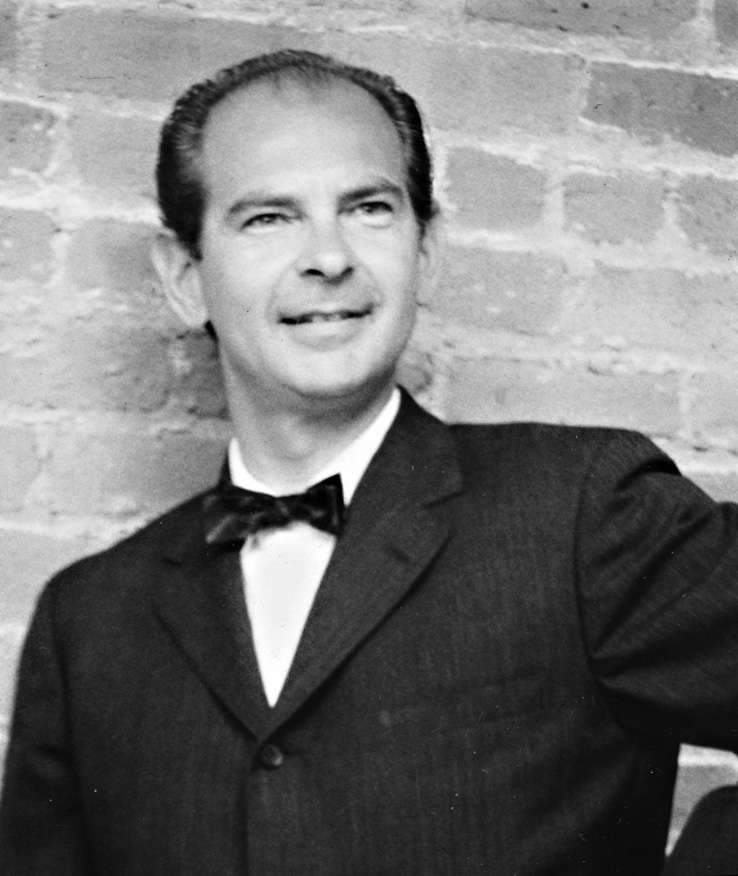
Mel Smilow in New York, circa 1954

Mel Smilow (March 5, 1922 – December 26, 2002) was an American furniture designer, artist, and partner in Smilow-Thielle, a mid-twentieth-century firm producing affordable, modern furniture and other interior furnishings, with retail outlets located in the New York metropolitan area and Washington, D.C.

== Early years ==
Mel Smilow was born in the Bronx, New York City, New York, the son of Irving Smilowitz and Claire Benes. He attended New York City public schools and enrolled at the Pratt Institute in 1939 with the intent of becoming a commercial artist. Upon his father's death that year he was forced to take over Irving's job of selling wholesale furniture to retail stores in New York and Pennsylvania.

Smilow was especially sensitive to the plight of the working class and the poor, and throughout his life championed causes that sought to end social inequality and discrimination in any form. After founding his own company he was proud that his employees were union members, and he consistently incorporated affordability and durability in his furniture designs.

== Military service ==
In 1944, Smilow enlisted in the U.S. Army, and after basic training was shipped to Europe, seeing action as an infantryman in the waning days of the war. Arriving in the French port of Le Havre, he travelled by train for two days in a box car until arriving in the Belgian town of Malmedy, where he witnessed the aftermath of the infamous Malmedy massacre and the carnage of the Battle of the Bulge, in the mountainous Ardennes region. Fighting in General Patton's Third Army during the grueling winter of 1944–1945, he was later awarded several medals including the Purple Heart.

== Career ==
After an honorable discharge from the army, Smilow returned to his job selling furniture. In 1949, in partnership with a colleague, Morton Thielle, he founded Smilow-Thielle, a manufacturer and retailer of modern furnishings. Frustrated by the lack of available, good-quality modern design, Smilow began designing furniture for the company; with his acute interest in and eye for modern design, he soon became its sole designer. The business evolved, selling only exclusive modern designs focusing on clean lines, exquisite attention to detail, and carefully calculated proportions, and it brought an American perspective to the Scandinavian designs that were becoming so popular in the mid-twentieth century. Using American hardwoods, particularly walnut, oak, and birch, the Smilow-Thielle product line included chairs, sofas, tables, its trademark “floating” cabinets, bookshelves, lamps, and eventually, textiles used for upholstery and draperies. Large pieces, such as sofas, chairs and bookshelves, had finished backs, allowing them to be freestanding pieces in the open floor plans popular in mid-century America. Zippered fabric covers on loose cushions could be removed for dry cleaning or repair, a significant savings when compared with reupholstering or outright replacement. With the goal of producing furnishings that were functional, durable. By eliminating the middleman, Smilow's pieces were designed to become family heirlooms, yet sufficiently affordable for average Americans.

As the Smilow-Thielle furnishings became increasingly popular, the number of their retail outlets increased: at its height, there were five Smilow-Thielle stores around the metropolitan New York area and one in Washington, DC. For more than 30 years, the firm's flagship store was located on Lexington Avenue between 64th and 65th Streets in Manhattan. Smilow-Thielle was also a regular advertiser in the Washington, DC newspapers and the front section of the Sunday New York Times for over a decade. Examples of Smilow's furniture were featured in publications such as The New York Times and discussed in The New Yorker magazine, and in books that chronicled modern designs of the times, including six examples in William Hennessey's Modern Furnishings for the Home. The Pratt Institute included an ottoman designed by Smilow in its 1955 exhibit of well-designed furniture available for under $25.00. In 1967, Smilow's Wooden Rocker, designed in 1960, was exhibited at the United States Pavilion at Expo 67 in Montreal. In 1988, Edward Fields Carpet Makers and the American Society of Interior Designers (ASID) awarded him first prize in their annual rug design competition for “Heartland,” with its textured and subtle geometric design.

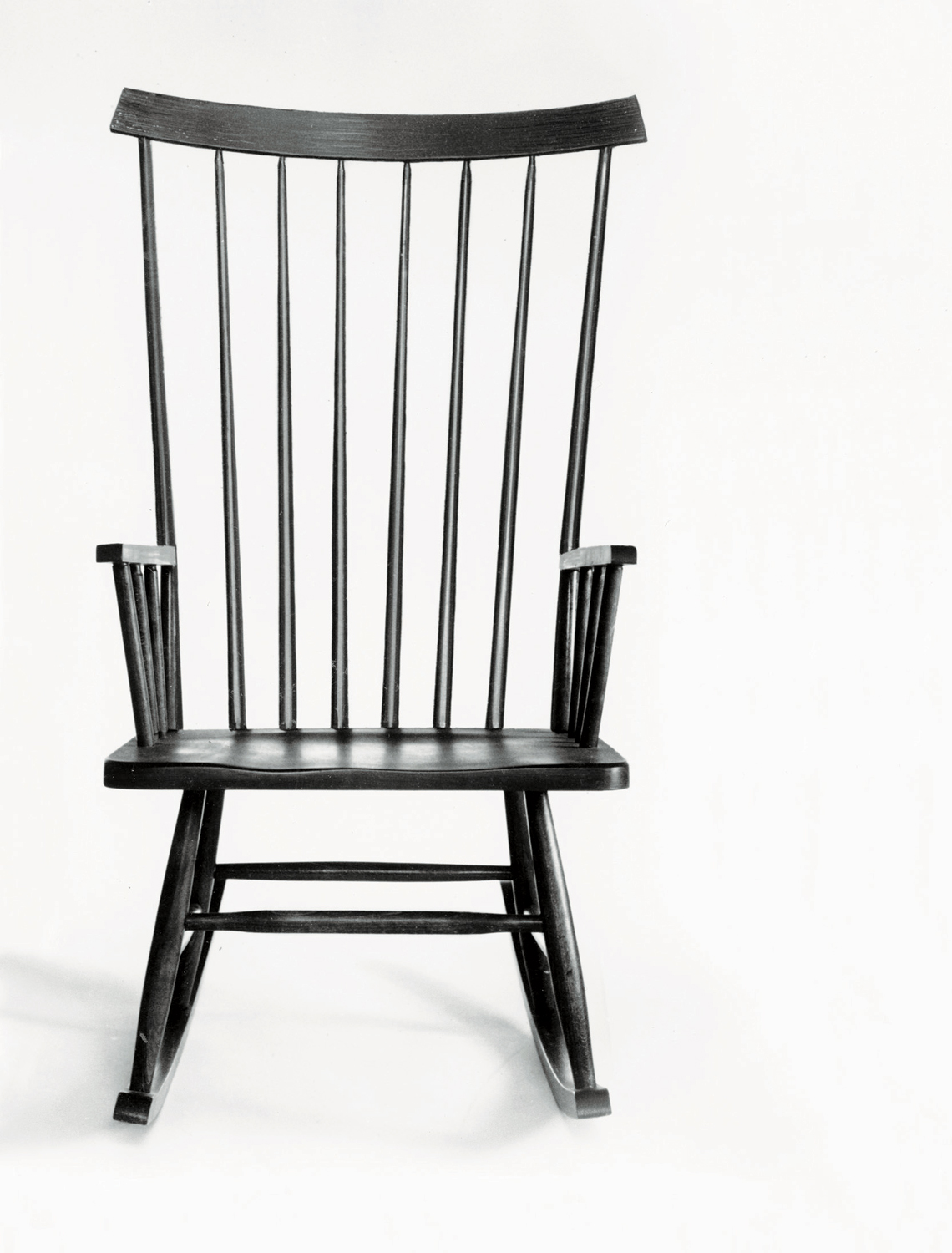
Smilow's Wooden Rocker, designed in 1960, and exhibited at Expo 67 in Montreal.

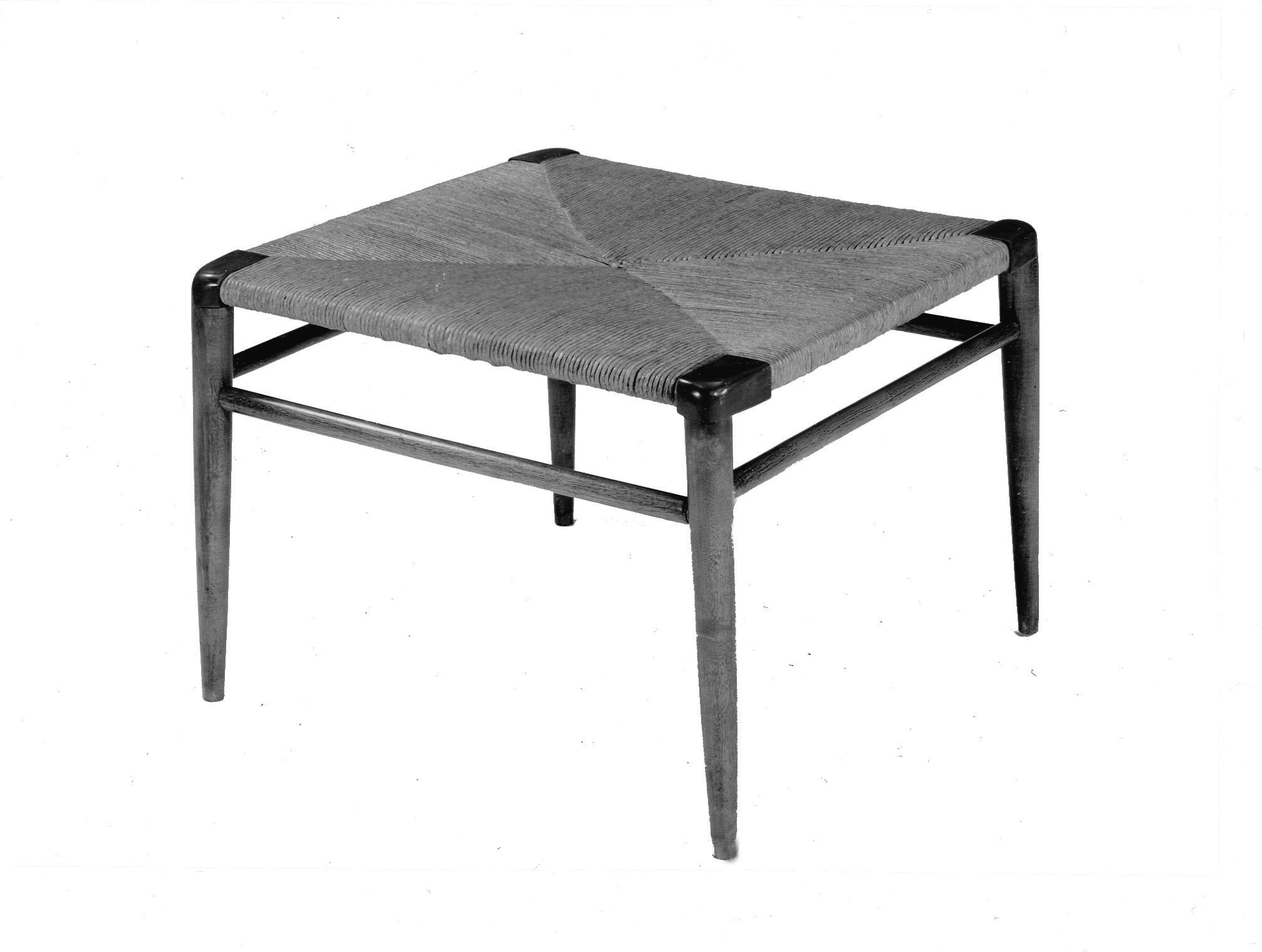
Rush ottoman from the 1955 Pratt Institute exhibition.

In 1969, Smilow and Thielle dissolved their partnership. Smilow retained sole ownership of both the company, operating as Smilow, Corp. and later as Contemporary Classics, as well as his flagship store at Lexington Avenue and 64th Street. By 1981, he retired and closed the business, but continued to offer custom furniture, cushions, and covers to his loyal customers while he pursued his passion for sculpting, painting, and printmaking.

In May 2013 a collection of Smilow Furniture was re-introduced at the ICFF (International Contemporary Furniture Fair) in New York City and is once again available.

== Personal life ==
In 1953, Smilow married Edith Kern, whom he had met at a furniture trade show where they were both exhibiting. Edith's family had owned the Heinrich Kern furniture factory in Heilbronn, Germany. After immigrating to the United States and settling in New York City, her family opened Kern Interiors, a modern furnishings and interior decorating firm. The Smilows had two daughters, Pamela, born in 1956, and Judy, born in 1958, both of whom became artists and designers in their own right.

=== Usonia ===
Smilow and his family moved to Pleasantville, New York, in 1963 to live in Frank Lloyd Wright's planned community, Usonia Homes. The Smilows purchased a home that had been built for Roger Kahn, the author of The Boys of Summer and designed by Aaron Resnick, one of Wright's students. Smilow loved the designs of the homes, which integrated the forms and proportions of the outside world with the design and functionality of their interiors. The simple shapes, clean lines, subtle details, and unobtrusive beauty appealed to his aesthetic. During the 1970s, he developed a growing interest in Japanese principles of art, specifically the concept of Shibui, the Japanese design philosophy. Eventually, he would create a Shibui collection of furnishings, which featured shoji screens, and finely detailed joinery on a simple floating platform bed, and accompanying low cabinets.

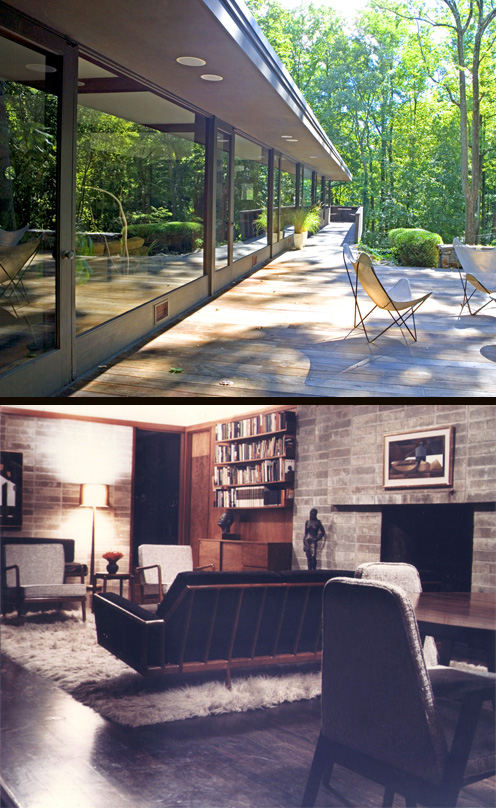
The Smilow home in Usonia (above), and interior view including Mel Smilow's furniture and paintings (below).

The ethos of Usonia served to underscore Smilow's belief, developed early on in his career, that beautiful furnishings should not be reserved for only the very affluent, but should be high-quality, durable pieces that meld form and function and provide regular working people with enduring modern classics.

== Death and legacy ==
On December 26, 2002, at the age of 81, Mel Smilow died after suffering from Alzheimer's disease.

== See also ==
- Mid-century modern
- Danish modern
