= Roland Reisley House =

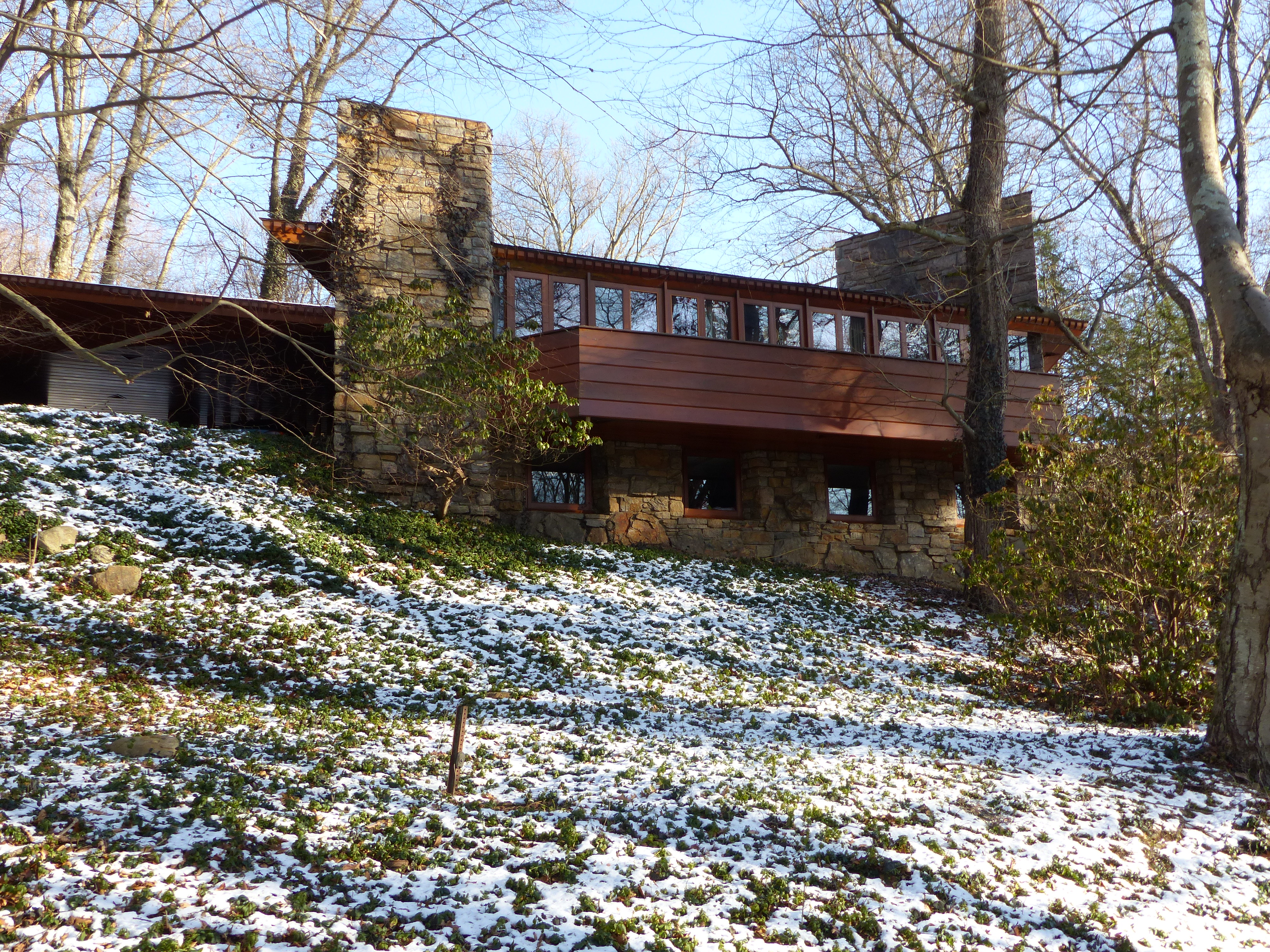

- Location within New York

General information
- Type: House
- Architectural style: Usonian
- Location: Pleasantville, New York
- Coordinates: 41.122869°N 73.745347°W
- Construction started: 1951

Technical details
- Floor area: 3,200 sq ft (300 m^{2})

Design and construction
- Architect: Frank Lloyd Wright

The Roland Reisley House is a residence in Pleasantville, New York, United States. The third of the "Usonia Homes" in the Usonia Historic District designed by Frank Lloyd Wright, the building sits on a hillside and has a masonry "core" and wood siding. Roland Reisley was 26 when he built his home. Reisley, a physicist who at the time lived on the Upper West Side of Manhattan with his wife Ronny, bought the site after hearing about Usonia in 1950.

The original house was completed in 1951 and expanded in 1956. It is placed on a hill because Wright wanted the building to be "of the hill", as if it had grown organically. The original structure had one bedroom, a study and a kitchen and a total of 1,800 square feet (170 m^{2}), while the addition covers 1,400 square feet (130 m^{2}). The entrance is dominated by a dramatic wood cantilevered carport, which leads to an impressive yet unpresumptuous low-slung house with cypress paneling and indigenous stone.

Usonia Homes was listed on the National Register of Historic Places in 2012. As of 2025, Reisley is the last living original owner of a home designed by Wright, as the house had never been sold.

== See also ==
- List of Frank Lloyd Wright works
