= Martin Scheiner =

American medical inventor

- Born: September 1, 1922; Bronx, New York
- Died: January 21, 1992; New York City
- Occupation: Inventor
- Spouse(s): Jane Barsky (d 1968), Ann McGovern (his death)

Martin Lane Scheiner (September 1, 1922 – January 21, 1992) was an American inventor of electronics devices for medical purposes. He founded Electronics for Medicine in 1950, and served as president and research director until selling it to Honeywell in 1979. Scheiner was a dedicated traveler and passionate about social causes.

== Early life and education ==
Scheiner was born in Bronx, New York, and grew up in Mount Vernon, New York with his sisters Olga Coren and twin Barbara Hooper.

Scheiner graduated from Columbia University in 1943, where he served as a recording engineer and president of the Columbia University Radio Club, now WKCR-FM. He was later awarded an honorary doctorate from New York Medical College.

== Electronics for medicine ==
After serving in the U.S. Navy during WWII, Scheiner founded Instrument Laboratories in 1950, which was soon renamed Electronics for Medicine in White Plains, NY. The company was a pioneer in developing instruments for cardiac catheterization, including for André Frédéric Cournand who co-won the 1956 Nobel Prize in Medicine for this work. EfM was also an early designer and producer of operating room, ICU and CCU monitors. Scheiner moved to Usonia, New York in 1957 and lived there for the rest of his life. The company relocated to Pleasantville, NY in the mid-1970s. In 1979 the company was sold to Honeywell, and although Scheiner owned less than half the company at the time, he shared over $1 million with his employees, $50 for each month they had worked for him.

== Personal life and death ==
Scheiner's first wife, the former Jane Barsky, with whom he had three children, died of cancer in 1968. He remained married to his second wife, the children's book author Ann McGovern, until his death, legally adopting her adult son. He lived in the Frank Lloyd Wright associated community of Usonia Historic District until his death from Leukemia in 1992 at Lenox Hill Hospital.
