= Sol Friedman House =

Sol Friedman House (Toyhill)
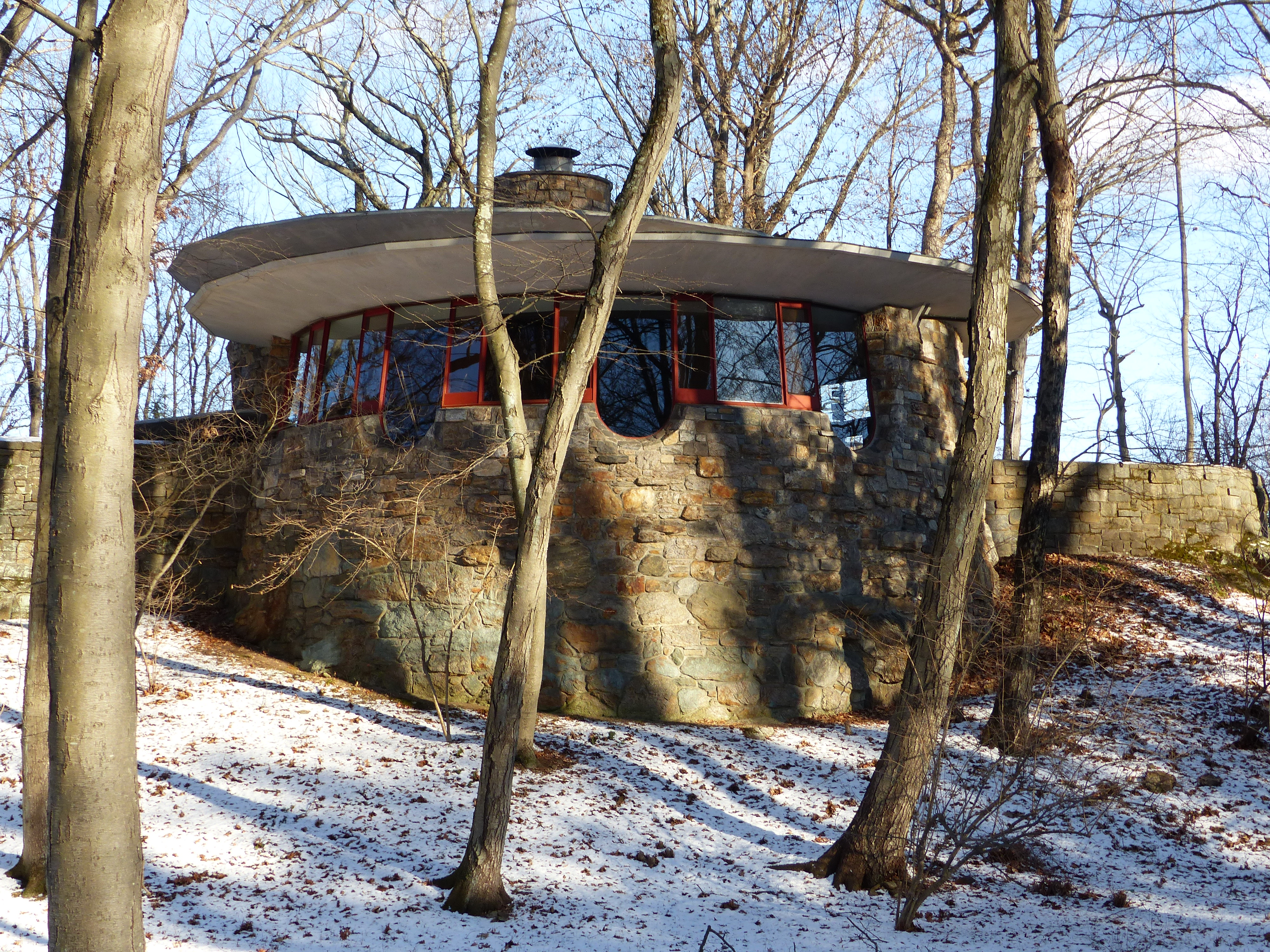

- Location within New York

General information
- Type: House
- Architectural style: Usonian
- Location: Pleasantville, New York
- Coordinates: 41.128856°N 73.748003°W
- Construction started: 1948

Design and construction
- Architect: Frank Lloyd Wright

Sol Friedman House (Toyhill) was built in Pleasantville, New York in 1948. This was the first of the three Frank Lloyd Wright homes built in the "Usonia Homes" development north of New York City.

The Friedman House forms part of the post-war development of Wright's use of the circle, culminating in his Solomon R. Guggenheim Museum in Manhattan. The Sol Friedman house in Pleasantville, N.Y., is roofed with mushroom-like concrete slabs; the two intersecting closed circles of the actual dwelling are balanced at the end of a straight terrace parapet by the mushroom-shaped carport. This house was completed in 1949 with battered (sloped) walls of almost Richardsonian random ashlar masonry below a strip of metal-framed windows.

Wright dubbed the house Toyhill because Sol Friedman was a retailer of books, records, and (in some stores) toys.

== See also ==
- List of Frank Lloyd Wright works
