= Ann McGovern =

American writer

- Born: Ann Weinberger; May 25, 1930; New York City, U.S.
- Died: August 8, 2015 (aged 85); New York City, U.S.
- Occupations: Author, poet
- Spouse: Martin Scheiner
- Children: 4
- Website: annmcgovern.com

Ann McGovern Scheiner (née Weinberger; May 25, 1930 – August 8, 2015) was an American writer of more than 55 children's books, selling over 30 million copies. She may be best known for her adaptation of Stone Soup, as well as Too Much Noise, historical and travel non-fiction, and biographies of figures like Harriet Tubman and Deborah Sampson and Eugenie Clark.

== Early life ==
Born in New York, New York, she enrolled in the University of New Mexico but dropped out to marry her English professor. The marriage ended and she moved back, at age 22, to New York City with her 18-month old son. In attempting to support herself and become a writer, she found a job at the publisher of Little Golden Books stamping galley prints. She published several books at Golden Books.

== Career ==
Artists for her books include Ezra Jack Keats, Simms Taback, Tomie de Paola and Mort Gerberg. She eventually moved into the Edna St. Vincent Millay house at 75½ Bedford Street, the narrowest house in New York, which inspired Mr Skinner's Skinny House (ISBN 978-0590076203). She married Martin Scheiner in 1970, the inventor of the first cardiac monitor for operating rooms, and adopted his three grown children. They lived together in the Usonia Historic District community in Westchester, New York.

She published four books of poetry in the 2000s, and began blogging about her cancer in 2014.

== Death ==
McGovern died of cancer in New York City on August 8, 2015, aged 85.

== Selected works ==
- Mr Skinner's Skinny House
- Aesop's Fables
- Little Whale
- Runaway Slave: The Story of Harriet Tubman
- Black is Beautiful
- Stone Soup
- Too Much Noise - 1967
- Eggs on Your Nose
- Robin Hood of Sherwood Forest
- Christopher Columbus
- The Desert Beneath the Sea
- Shark Lady: True Adventures of Eugenie Clark
- The Secret Soldier: The Story of Deborah Sampson - 1975
- Night Dive - 1984
- If You Sailed on the Mayflower in 1620 - 1969
- The Pilgrims' First Thanksgiving - 1973
- Nicholas Bentley Stoningpot III - 1982
- Treasury of Christmas Stories Edited By: Ann McGovern - 1960
