= Estelle Bernadotte =

- Countess of Wisborg
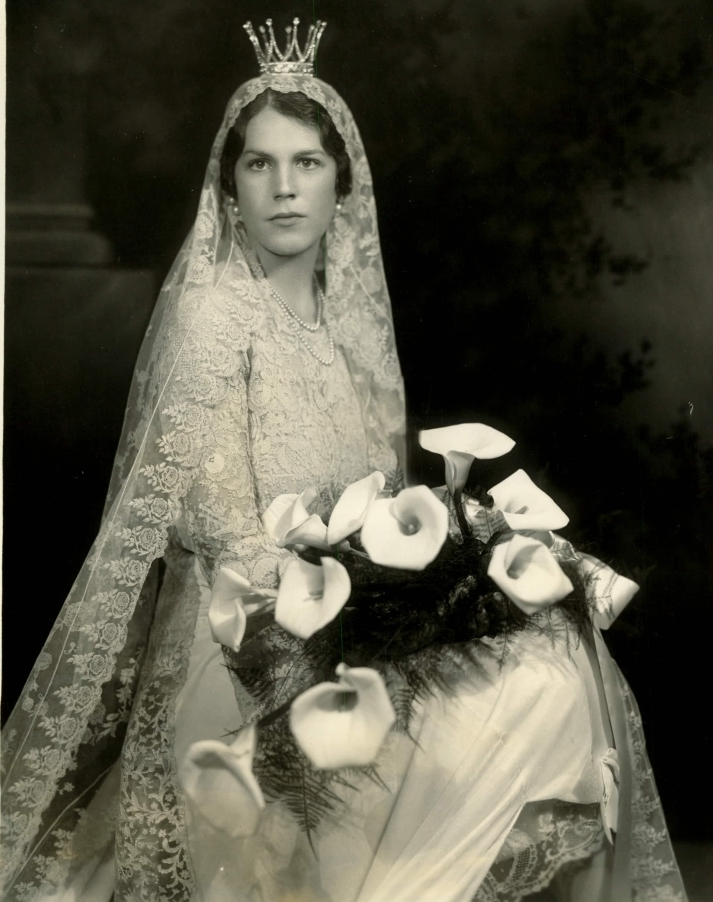
- Estelle Manville in 1928
- Born: Estelle Romaine Manville; September 26, 1904; Pleasantville, New York, U.S.
- Died: May 28, 1984 (aged 79); Uppsala, Sweden
- Burial: June 20, 1984; Norra begravningsplatsen
- Spouse: Folke Bernadotte, Count of Wisborg (m. 1928; died 1948) Carl Erik Sixten Ekstrand (m. 1973)
- House: Bernadotte

Estelle Bernadotte (born Estelle Romaine Manville; September 26, 1904 – May 28, 1984), Countess of Wisborg (1928–1973), also known as Estelle Ekstrand (from 1973), was an American-Swedish countess who was a leading figure in the International Red Cross and Girl Scout movement. She married Count Folke Bernadotte, a Swedish member of a United Nations mediating team. He was assassinated by the Zionist paramilitary group Lehi while on duty in Israel in September 1948.

== Life ==
Estelle Romaine Manville was born in 1904 in Pleasantville, New York. She was the only daughter of American industrialist Hiram Edward Manville and wife Henrietta Estelle Romaine, members of a family that had founded parts of the Johns Manville Corporation, once the world leader in asbestos production.

=== Wedding ===
In 1928, she was married to the Swedish diplomat Count Folke Bernadotte. According to members of the Bernadotte family, King Gustaf V of Sweden personally introduced Estelle Manville to his nephew, Count Folke Bernadotte, during a visit to Nice, France, in the summer of 1928. On August 3, 1928, it was widely reported that Mr. and Mrs. Manville officially announced the engagement of their only daughter to Count Folke Bernadotte.

The wedding took place on December 1, 1928, in the rather small St. John's Episcopal Church in Pleasantville, New York. At the wedding the bride wore a Swedish bridal crown in platinum and rock crystal and Queen Sophia's bridal veil in openwork lace. The veil was held by a coronet in silver and crystals, which was specially made by the Swedish court jeweler. Prince Gustaf Adolf was the Best man and Prince Sigvard the Marshal. More than 1500 guests were invited to the festivities on the Manville estates, Hi-Esmaro. Wedding expenses totaled $1.5 million.

=== Professional life ===
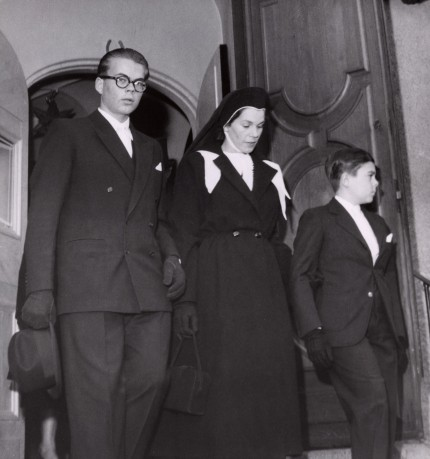
Bernadotte, with her two sons Folke (b. 1931) and Bertil (b. 1935), leaving for Folke Bernadotte's funeral. Picture taken at the entrance of the Bernadotte residence in Stockholm, September 26, 1948.

In May 1948, Estelle's husband Folke Bernadotte was appointed the United Nations' mediator in Palestine, the first official mediator in UN history. This appointment followed the immediate violence that followed the United Nations Partition Plan for Palestine and the subsequent unilateral Israeli Declaration of Independence. In this capacity, he succeeded in achieving an initial truce during the subsequent 1948 Arab–Israeli War and laid the groundwork for the United Nations Relief and Works Agency for Palestine Refugees in the Near East. The specific proposals showed the influence of the previously responsible British government, and to a lesser extent the U.S. government. On Friday, September 17 of that same year, Folke Bernadotte was assassinated in Jerusalem by the Israeli militant group Lehi.

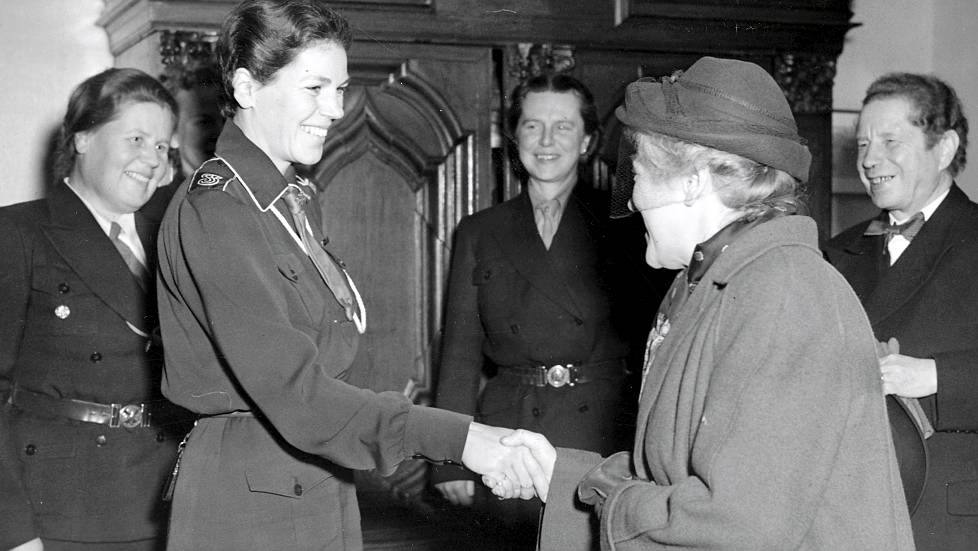
In 1949, Bernadotte became the president of the Swedish Girls' Guide and Scout Association. Dressed in a girl scout uniform, Bernadotte greets the wife of the Swedish ambassador to Finland. Helsinki, 1949.

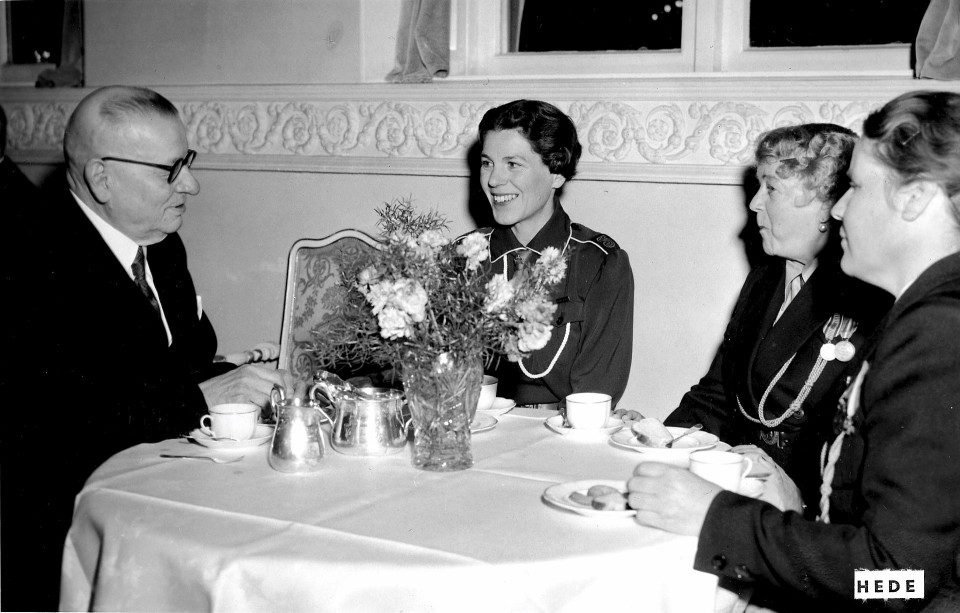
Bernadotte talking with J. K. Paasikivi, the President of Finland. Helsinki, 1949.

As her husband's widow, Estelle Bernadotte was active in philanthropic endeavours that he had supported, including the International Red Cross. She was president of the Swedish Girls' Guide and Scout Association from 1949 to 1957. She supported the United Nations Children's Fund (UNICEF) and international conservation efforts.

On September 17, 1958, on the 10th anniversary of the assassination of her husband Folke Bernadotte, she became the first leader of the Folke Bernadotte Foundation, a charity that supports children with cerebral palsy. The foundation was created and supported by the Swedish Guide and Scout Association, the Swedish Red Cross, the Gothenburg Deaconess Society, and twenty other non-profit organizations, as well as by prominent medical and educational expertise. Under Bernadotte's leadership, the Folke Bernadotte Foundation widened its mission to help children and young people with other disabilities. Bernadotte was also the leader of the Folke Bernadotte Memorial Fund, a foundation whose mission is to increase understanding among young people at the international level.

In her later life, she managed a care home for elderly women in Stockholm.

=== Later life and death ===
Bernadotte lived her later years in Saint-Paul-de-Vence, France. She was survived by two sons and her second husband Carl Erik Sixten Ekstrand (1910-1988). They were married on March 3, 1973 at Oscar's Church in Stockholm. Bernadotte died in 1984 in Uppsala after long illness (sepsis) following hip surgery. Her ashes were buried on June 20, 1984, in an unmarked section of the memorial field at the Norra begravningsplatsen cemetery in Solna, north of Stockholm. Her name Estelle Bernadotte of Wisborg appears as her written signature on the memorial plaque of her first husband, Count Folke Bernadotte, at the same cemetery.

== Children ==
Estelle and Folke Bernadotte had four sons, two of whom died in childhood.

- Count Gustaf Eduard Bernadotte of Wisborg, January 20, 1930, Stockholm – February 2, 1936, Stockholm; died of complications following surgery.
- Count Folke Bernadotte of Wisborg, born in Pleasantville, New York, on February 8, 1931, in 1955 married Christine Glahns (born January 9, 1932).
- Count Fredrik Oscar Bernadotte of Wisborg, January 10, 1934, Stockholm – August 30, 1934, Stockholm.
- Count Bertil Oscar Bernadotte of Wisborg, born in Stockholm October 6, 1935, in 1966 married Rose-Marie Heering (1942–1967), and in 1981 married Jill Georgina Rhodes-Maddox.

== Legacy ==
There has been speculation that Princess Estelle of Sweden (b. 2012), second in the line of succession to the Swedish throne, was given her name in honor of Bernadotte. On February 3, 2012, King Carl XVI Gustaf of Sweden told a special cabinet meeting to announce the name of the princess that the name is very close to the heart of her mother and the family. Bernadotte's son Folke Bernadotte Jr. (b. 1931) said in an interview that he is very honored that princess Estelle (as he assumed) was named after his mother, and that the royal family has a special relationship to her and her voluntary work aiding people in need.
