= Usonia Historic District =

Historic district in Pleasantville, New York

- U.S. National Register of Historic Places
- U.S. Historic district
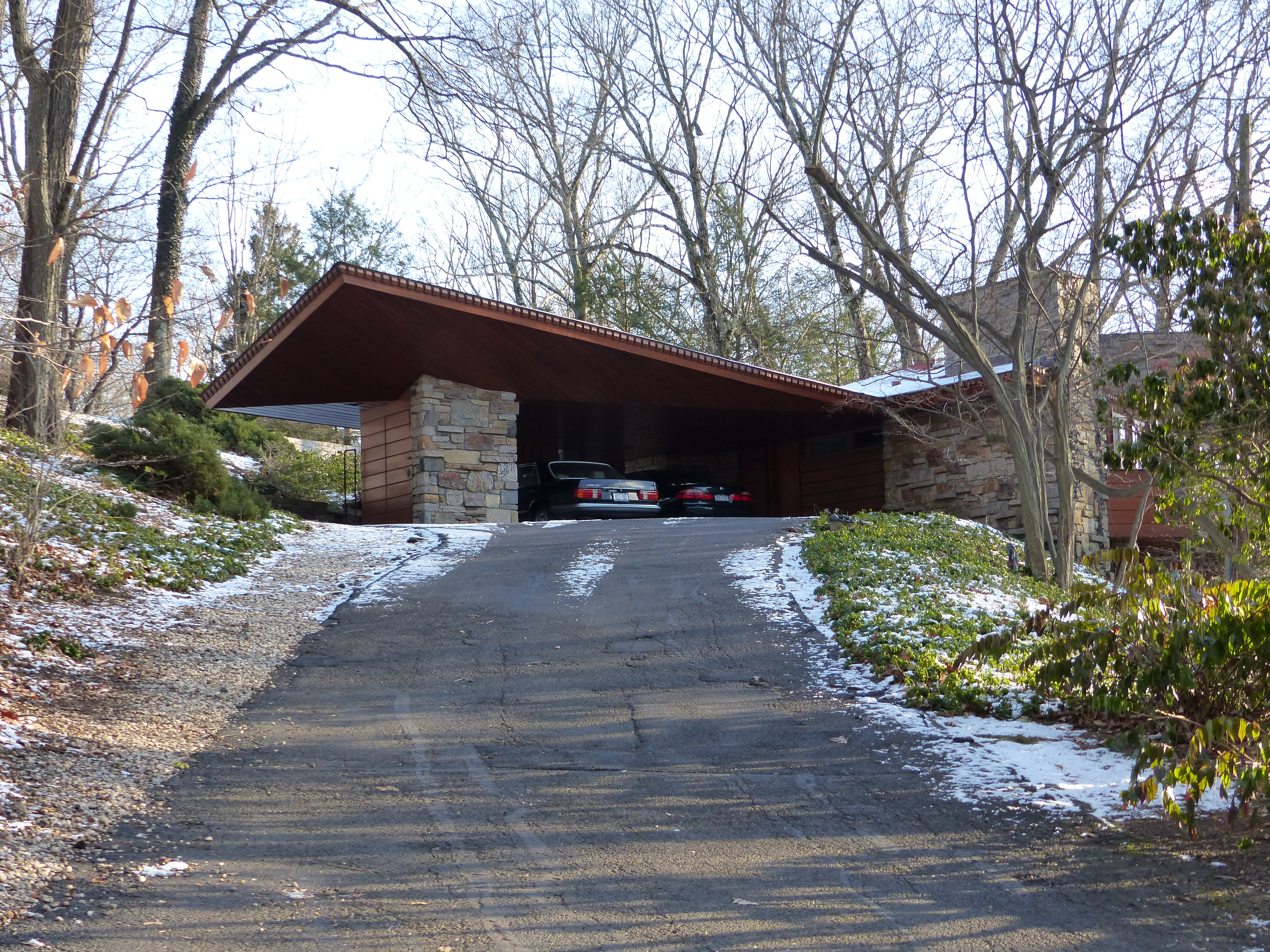
- The Roland Reisley House, one of three houses Frank Lloyd Wright designed for the district
- Interactive map showing Usonia Historic District
- Location: Usonia & Rocky Vale Rds., Laurel Hill & Orchard Brook Drs., Pleasantville, New York
- Coordinates: 41°07′42″N 73°44′56″W
- Area: 95.1 acres (38.5 ha)
- Built: 1946-1964
- Architects: Frank Lloyd Wright and others
- Architectural style: Modern
- NRHP reference No.: 12000600
- Added to NRHP: September 5, 2012

Usonia Historic District is a planned community and national historic district in the Town of Mount Pleasant, adjacent to the village of Pleasantville, Westchester County, New York.

== History ==
In 1945, a 100-acre (0.40 km^{2}) rural tract was purchased by a cooperative of young couples from New York City, who were able to enlist the students of Frank Lloyd Wright to build his Broadacre City concept. Wright decided where each house should be placed. Wright designed three homes himself and approved architectural plans of the other 44, which were designed by such architects as Paul Schweikher, Theodore Dixon Bower, Ulrich Franzen, Kaneji Domoto, Aaron Resnick, and David Henken – an engineer and Wright apprentice.

It was listed on the National Register of Historic Places in 2012 as the Usonia Historic District. The historic district encompasses 43 contributing buildings, one contributing site, and three contributing structures.

== Description ==
The layout of the neighborhood was planned by Wright in a circular manner, preserving most of the original trees and "encouraging the flow of the land". The balance of the homes were decreed to be in the modern "organic" style ordained by Wright. The community was named "Usonia" in homage to Wright, whose ideas on the way Americans should live together guided their plan.

== Gallery ==
The Frank Lloyd Wright-designed Usonian homes in Pleasantville are:

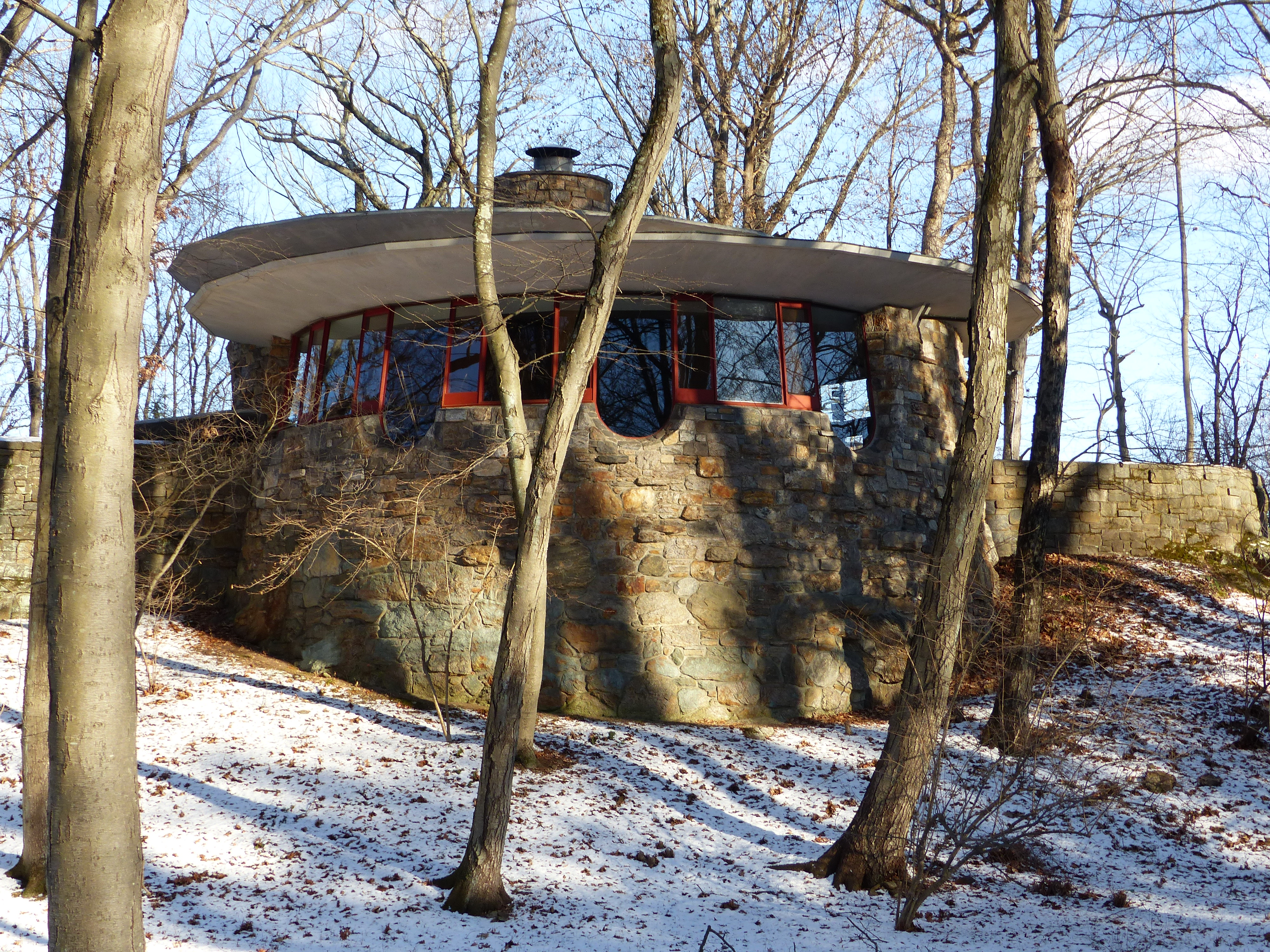
Sol Friedman House

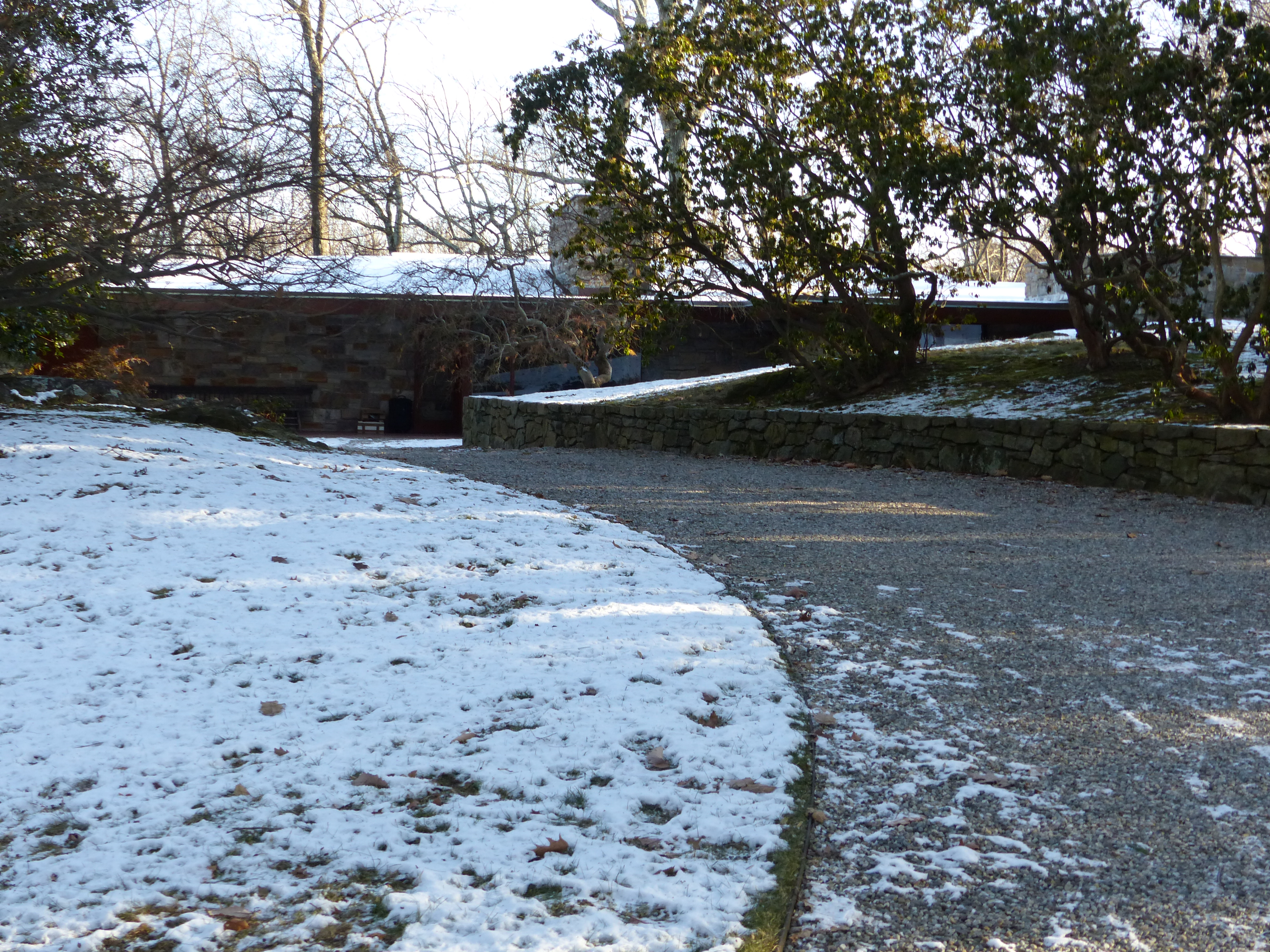
Edward Serlin House

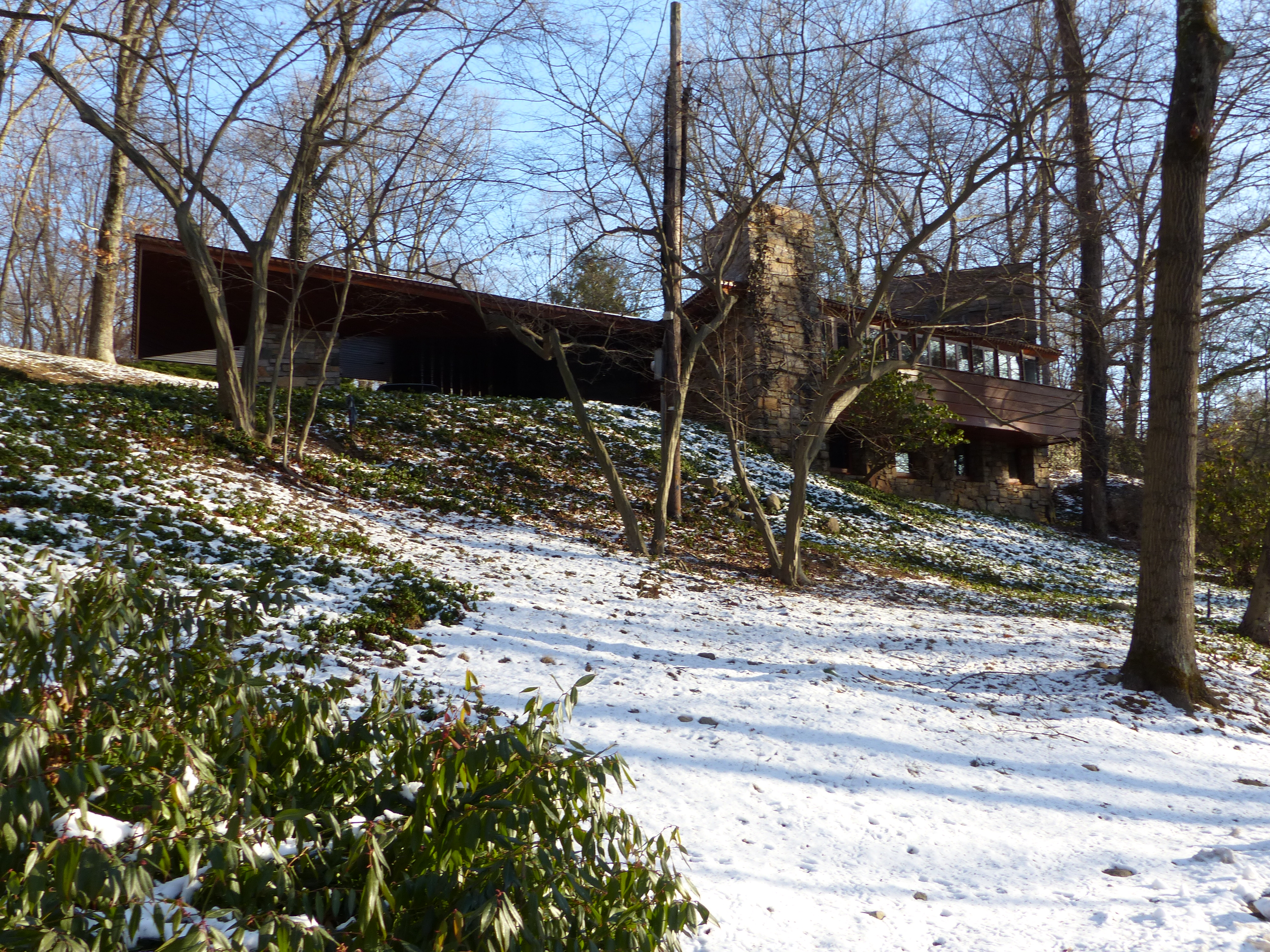
Roland Reisley House

Other homes include:

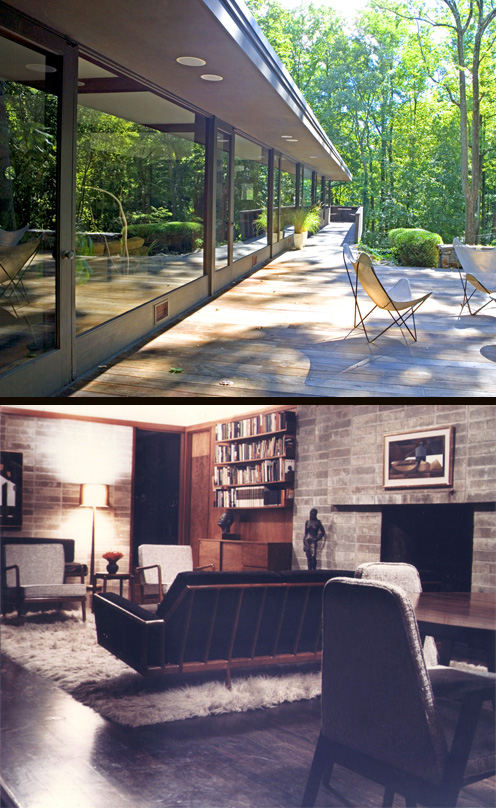
The Aaron Resnick-designed Mel Smilow home

== Notable residents ==
- Aaron Resnick
- Mel Smilow
- Martin Scheiner
- Ann McGovern
- Roger Kahn

== See also ==
- List of Frank Lloyd Wright works
- National Register of Historic Places listings in northern Westchester County, New York
