= Aaron Resnick =

American architect

- Born: Manhattan, NY
- Died: Westchester County, NY
- Occupations: Architect and professor of architecture and engineering at the New York Institute of Technology

Aaron L. Resnick (December 13, 1914 – October 29, 1986) was an American architect, a disciple of Frank Lloyd Wright, and one of the founders and chief architects of what has now become known as the Usonia Historic District. Listed on the National Register of Historic Places in Pleasantville, New York, Resnick designed twelve of the forty-three homes there. A structural engineer, as well as an architect, Resnick and his colleague, David Henken were in charge of constructing the Wright designed roads and the water system for the whole project, submitting plans to Wright for his approval.

== Career as architect ==
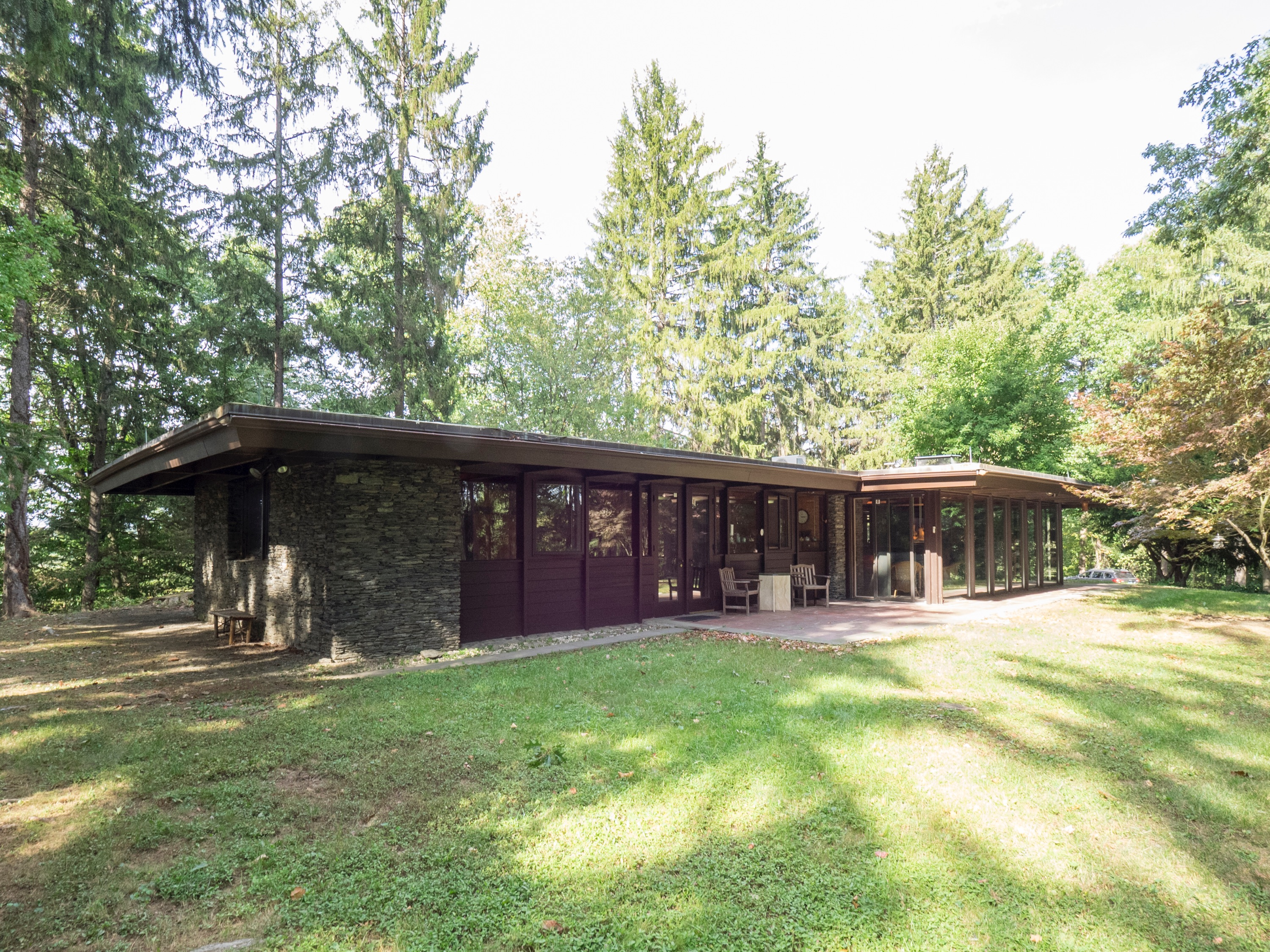
Calabi-Picker House

Resnick graduated from Brooklyn Technical High School. Later he went on to study architecture at New York University and engineering at City University of New York. Resnick taught architecture and engineering at the New York Institute of Technology from 1965 to 1985 while running his own firm. In 2015 Architectural Digest cited one of Resnick's houses as "a spectacular example of period design."

A collection of over 100 Aaron Resnick designs, 1947–1986, are housed in the Avery Drawings & Archives collection of Columbia University along with designs of Frank Lloyd Wright, Ulrich Franzen, Paul Schweikher and David Henken. Among other notable Usonian homes designed by Resnick is the Calabi-Picker House (1956) in Dutchess County, New York. In 1983 Resnick designed an addition to the house to serve as a work studio for the composer, Tobias Picker. Picker's mother, the artist, Henriette Simon Picker (1917–2016), later used it as her art studio working there until her death in 2016 at the age of 99. In recognition of Resnick's contributions to the architectural development of the Usonian home the Westchester Hudson Valley Chapter of the American Institute of Architects grants a yearly scholarship to a promising young architectural student in his name.

=== Style ===
Commenting on his Usonia work to The New York Times in 1981, Resnick recalled: I think there was a great surge of idealism after the war, which gave us a freedom to do what we wanted to do. We were united on several concepts: we wanted natural or organic houses, we wanted a sense of community spirit and we needed homes that could be built inexpensively. And, of course, we were all admirers of architect Frank Lloyd Wright. Of course, in those days architects weren't talking about passive or active solar. But, esthetically, we were concentrating on opening up the house to the south, to greet the sunshine. Additionally, many of Resnick's Usonian homes used circles and curves far more than the typical architecture of the time.

== Family ==
In 1949, Aaron Resnick and his wife, Mildred became the first family to move to Usonia into a house Resnick designed. The house exhibits the quintessential Usonian vocabulary: open workspace, clerestory windows, natural brick, and red concrete floors.

== Death ==
Aaron Resnick died of a heart attack, October 29, 1986 at the age of 72.
