= Electronics for Medicine =

Medical electronics company

Electronics for Medicine, commonly known as "E for M," was a pioneering company in medical electronics. Founded in the 1950s by Martin Scheiner to make instrumentation for recording physiological signals from the heart, it was based in Westchester County, New York.

Its product line ultimately included instrumentation for all cardiac-related medical procedures, including electrocardiography, electrophysiology, echocardiography, and patient monitoring. Its DR and VR series physiological recorders were used in almost every cardiac catheterization laboratory from the 1950s well into the 1980s, and are widely mentioned in cardiology papers of that era (e.g.,). It was initially developed for André Cournand of Columbia University, who shared the Nobel Prize for Medicine with Dickinson W. Richards and Werner Forssmann for work exploring the interior of the heart.

In 1979, the company was sold to Honeywell, and its name was changed to E for M/Honeywell. Scheiner shared more than $1 million of the proceeds of the sale with employees, gifting them $50 for each month they worked for E for M. It was later sold to PPG Industries, and disappeared a few years after that.
