= Marmaduke Forster House =

Historic house in New York, United States

- U.S. National Register of Historic Places
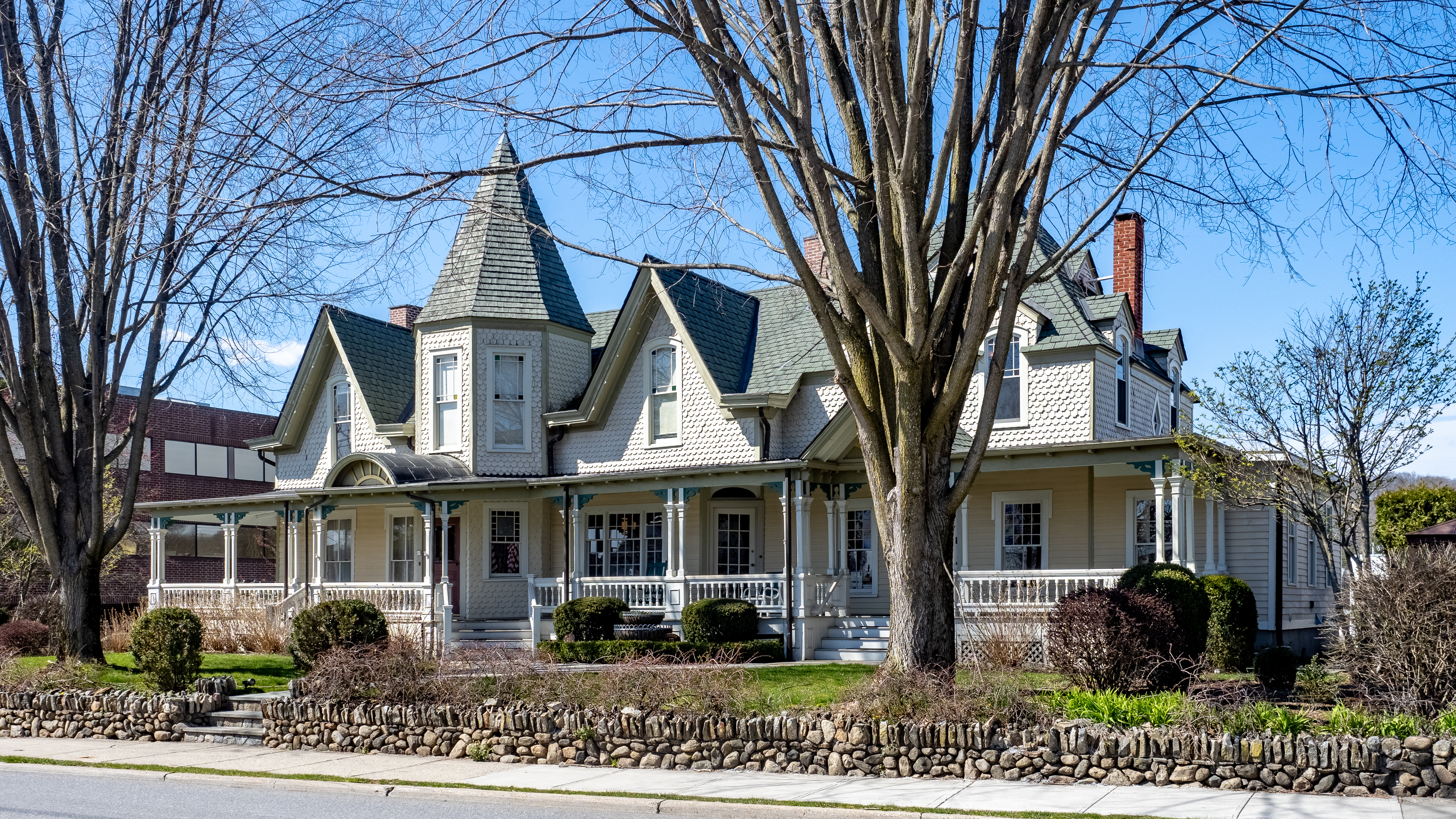

- Location within New York Location within the United States
- Location: 413-415 Bedford Rd., Pleasantville, New York
- Coordinates: 41°08′04″N 73°47′23″W
- Area: 0.33 acres (0.13 ha)
- Built: c. 1785, c. 1840, 1895
- Architectural style: Gothic Revival, Queen Anne
- NRHP reference No.: 11000139
- Added to NRHP: February 22, 2011

Marmaduke Forster House, also known as the Forster-Hobby-Washburn House, is an historic home located in Pleasantville, Westchester County, New York. The original section of the house was built about 1785 by Marmaduke Forster, a colonial carpenter from New York City, as a 1 1/2-story, timber frame dwelling. It was remodeled and enlarged in the 19th century, first about 1840 in the Gothic Revival style and again in 1895 by architect George P. Washburn. This later modification added Queen Anne style elements - an octagonal turret on the front facade and a chateau wing with 20 colored glass panes. The house features a rambling 80-feet verandah with elaborate woodwork. The house was renovated in 2007, and a two-story addition built. Currently it houses small business offices.

It was added to the National Register of Historic Places in 2011.

== See also ==
- National Register of Historic Places listings in northern Westchester County, New York
