= Pleasantville Music Festival =

Festival in Pleasantville, NY

Coordinates: 41.130°N 73.792°W

- Dates: Saturday, July 11, 2026
- Locations: Parkway Field; Pleasantville, Westchester County, New York, United States
- Years active: 2005—present
- Founder: Jim Zimmerman
- Website: pleasantvillemusicfestival.com

The Pleasantville Music Festival is a single-day music festival held annually at Parkway Field in Pleasantville, New York.

Some of the many acts who have performed at the Pleasantville Music Festival include: Dawes, Blues Traveler, Living Colour, The Revivalists, X Ambassadors, Big Head Todd & the Monsters, Jakob Dylan, Joan Osborne, Marc Cohn, Better Than Ezra, The Record Company, The Wailers, They Might Be Giants, Sophie B. Hawkins, Everclear, Soul Asylum, Aimee Mann, Matthew Sweet, Suzanne Vega, Robert Randolph, Jessica Lynn, Crash Test Dummies, Black Joe Lewis & the Honeybears, Paula Cole, Ripe, Guster, KT Tunstall, The Smithereens, Gin Blossoms, G Love & Special Sauce, Fastball, the English Beat, The Allman Betts Band, August Ponthier, Rainbow Kitten Surprise, Jill Sobule, and Roger McGuinn. These major acts perform alongside up-and-coming regional acts and small local bands from around the tri-state area.
