= Pleasantville, New York =

- Village
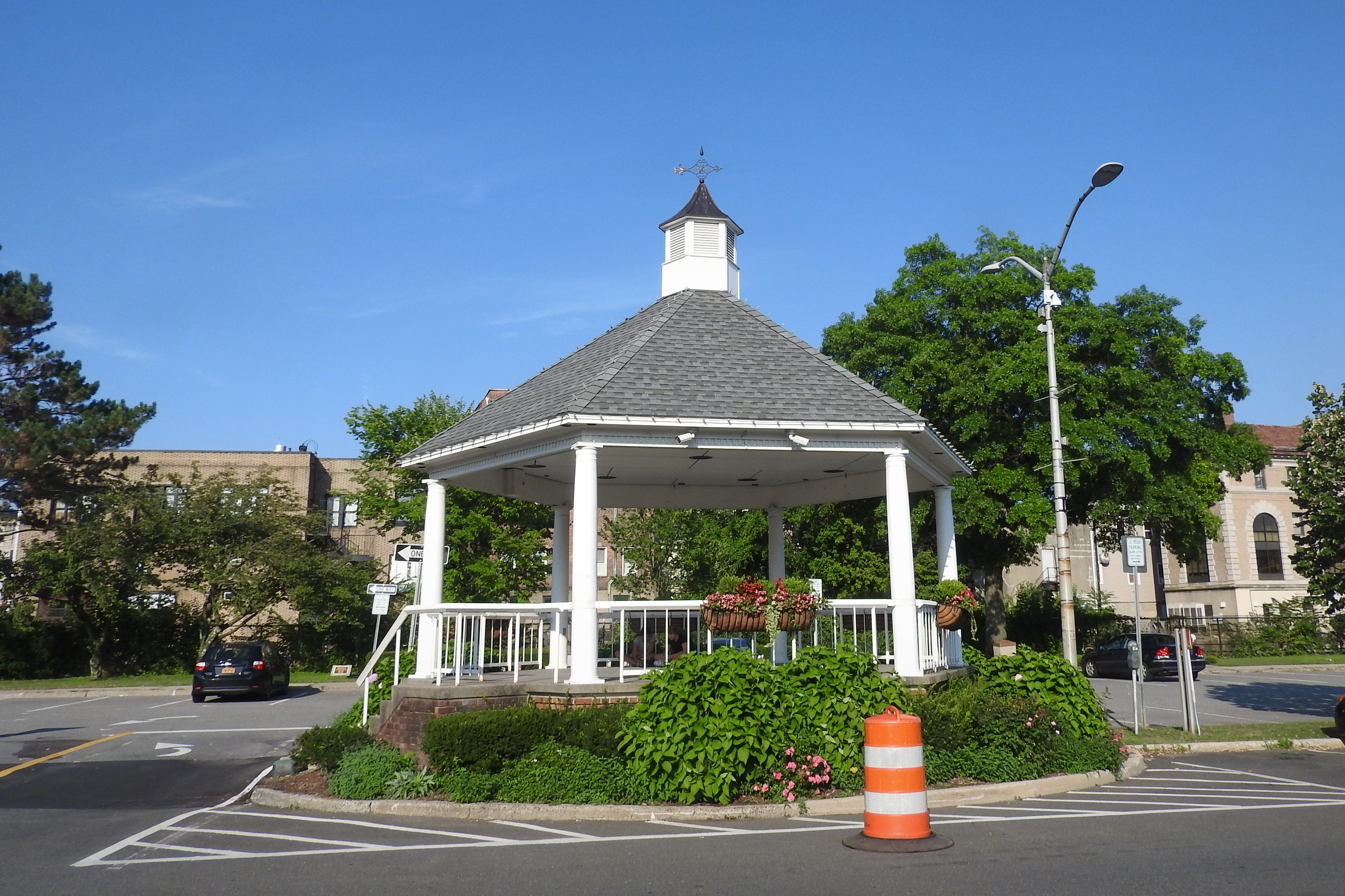
- Gazebo near train station

- Flag Seal Logo

- Location within Westchester County and state of New York
- Coordinates: 41°8′11″N 73°47′15″W
- Country: United States
- State: New York
- County: Westchester
- Town: Mount Pleasant
- Settled: 1695
- Incorporated: 1897

Government
  - Mayor: Peter Scherer

Area
  - Total: 1.85 sq mi (4.80 km^{2})
  - Land: 1.85 sq mi (4.80 km^{2})
  - Water: 0.0039 sq mi (0.01 km^{2})
- Elevation: 292 ft (89 m)

Population (2020)
  - Total: 7,513
  - Density: 4,050/sq mi (1,570/km^{2})
- Time zone: UTC−5 (EST)
  - Summer (DST): UTC−4 (EDT)
- ZIP Codes: 10570–10572
- Area code: 914
- FIPS code: 36-58728
- GNIS ID: 96074
- Website: www.pleasantville-ny.gov

Pleasantville is a village in the town of Mount Pleasant, in Westchester County, New York, United States. It is located 30 miles north of Manhattan. The village population was 7,513 at the 2020 census. Pleasantville is home to the secondary campus of Pace University and to the Jacob Burns Film Center. Most of Pleasantville is served by the Pleasantville Union Free School District, with small parts of northern Pleasantville served by the Chappaqua Central School District. The village is also home to the Bedford Road School, Pleasantville Middle School, and Pleasantville High School. The region of Pleasantville commonly referred to as "The Flats" is mostly served by the Mount Pleasant Central School district.

== History ==
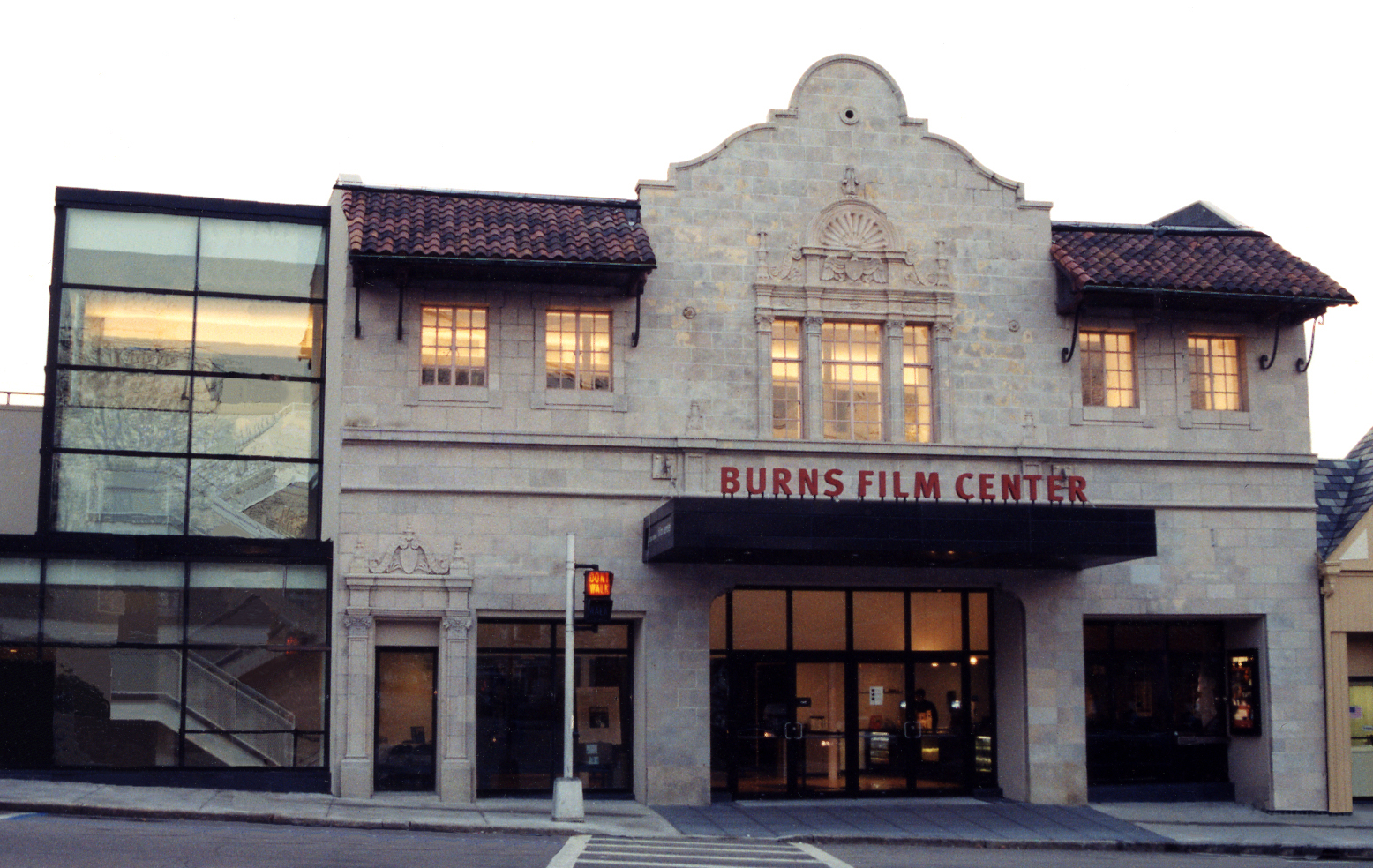
The Jacob Burns Film Center in Pleasantville

The settlement of Pleasantville dates back to the Rechgawawank and Sinsink tribes, belonging to the Munsee dialect of the Lenni Lenape. This region of the Hudson Valley has been inhabited since just after the last ice age. Lenape communities practiced ecosystem management, small-scale agriculture, hunting and gathering, democratic politics, and matrilineal governance. Called the "Grandfathers" by neighboring tribes, the Lenape were peaceful and skilled at conflict resolution between tribes and established trading routes crossing through the present-day village before the arrival of Europeans. By the end of the 17th century, most if not all of the New York Lenape people had been killed by disease or conflict or had been displaced westward; Lenape in the 21st century reside in Ontario, Oklahoma, Ohio, Wisconsin, New Jersey, and Pennsylvania. French Huguenot Isaac See (Note: Sometimes spelled "Sie".) settled here as an agent for Dutch landowner Frederick Philipse in 1695, beginning the modern settler-colonial history of Pleasantville.

By the time of the American Revolution, the population of the growing settlement comprised English, Dutch, and Quakers, most of whom were tenant farmers. During the Revolution, this area was part of the Neutral Ground, where there were conflicting loyalties among the settlers. British spy Major John André passed through present-day Pleasantville carrying information from Benedict Arnold at Fort Clinton (West Point) to the British in New York City. André lost his bearings near the present-day corner of Bedford Road and Choate Lane and was captured in Tarrytown, New York. The capture of André is often cited as a key factor in the ultimate victory of the American forces.

As the area's population grew in the early 19th century, the settlement was called Clark's Corners, referring to property owned by Henry Clark at the intersection of Broadway and Bedford Road. This area was the village's original commercial center. In the 1820s, the newly appointed postmaster, Henry Romer, was directed by the Postmaster General's office in Washington, D.C., to give a name to the post office planned here. Romer's proposed name, Clarksville, was rejected because another New York post office already had the name. His second choice, Pleasantville, was accepted, and the Pleasantville Post Office opened on February 29, 1828.

A significant change in the development of Pleasantville came with the arrival of the New York Central Railroad and New York and Harlem Railroad in 1846. In the following year, a train station was built near the present corner of Bedford Road and Wheeler Avenue, and as a result the commercial center of Pleasantville shifted to its current location. The older business district at Bedford Road and Broadway is today called the Old Village. The railroad offered a speedier and more frequent connection with New York City—only 70 minutes away by rail, compared with a five-hour overland journey by stagecoach or a two-hour steamboat trip down the Hudson River. The present-day train station, which currently houses a restaurant, was built in 1905 and was moved to its present location in the 1950s to accommodate the lowering of the tracks below grade. Before the addition of the now heavily trafficked station, commuters working in New York City and lower Westchester County were forced to rely on rides from Marc Damon, now famous in Pleasantville for being "The Friendly Coachman".

According to several sources, Pleasantville was a stop on the Underground Railroad, a network of safe houses for escaped slaves from the South on their way to freedom in the north.

The latter half of the 19th century was a time of rapid growth in Pleasantville. By the 1870s, there were four shoemaking businesses, a shirtmaking business, and a pickle factory. The first newspaper to serve the village, The Pleasantville Pioneer, was launched in about 1886. The village's numerous small farms and orchards began to be subdivided for a wave of solid foursquare and Victorian houses built for a growing middle class. The 1890s saw the establishment of a police department, volunteer fire department, and a library system. Pleasantville was incorporated as a village on March 16, 1897.

In the following years, Pleasantville quickly developed into a modern suburb of New York, with a large number of workers commuting between the village and the metropolis on what is now the Metro-North Railroad's Harlem Line. During the first two decades of the 20th century, roads were paved for the first time, water mains were installed, and electrical wires brought power to the village's houses. Other improvements during the first half of the 20th century include the construction of Soldiers and Sailors Field in 1909, the Saw Mill River Parkway in 1924, the Rome Theater in 1925, Memorial Plaza in 1930, Parkway Field in 1930, and Nannahagen Park in 1937 (the adjacent village pool was completed two years later). By the time of World War II, the village had taken on the appearance that it bears today.

Pleasantville merits interest for its literary history. Playwright Lillian Hellman (The Children's Hour, The Little Foxes) bought Hardscrabble Farm on the western outskirts of Pleasantville and lived there in the 1940s and 1950s. For many years author Dashiell Hammett (The Thin Man, The Maltese Falcon), with whom Hellman was romantically involved, lived and worked at Hardscrabble Farm. DeWitt Wallace and Lila Bell Wallace, co-founders of Reader's Digest, made Pleasantville their headquarters in 1922, using a converted garage and pony shed on Eastview Avenue as their office and later building a home and larger office space on adjacent property. Subsequently, the Digest held office space in several buildings throughout Pleasantville, including the present-day Village Hall at Bedford Road and Wheeler Avenue and, diagonally opposite, the bank building currently occupied by Chase. Reader's Digest moved its headquarters to nearby Chappaqua in 1939, but retained its Pleasantville post office box, thus making the name of the village familiar to millions of Reader's Digest subscribers around the world. Pleasantville is also the home of Joseph Wallace, writer of the novel Diamond Ruby. Today Pleasantville is home to many novelists, editors, and writers, who find its easygoing charm and proximity to New York an attractive combination.

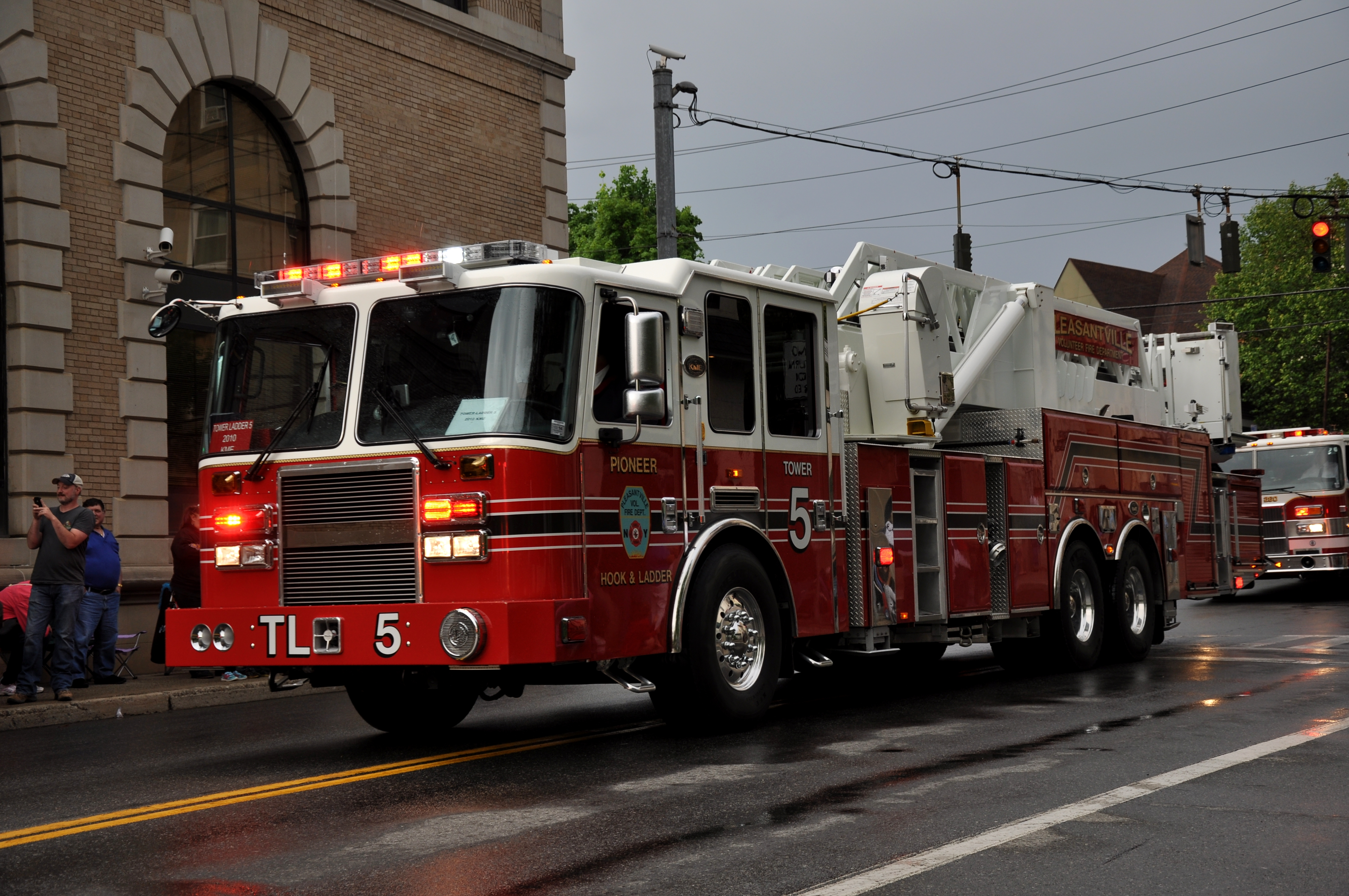
Pleasantville Firefighters' Parade, 2014

Pleasantville's reputation as a cultural center was enhanced in 2001 with the opening of the nonprofit Jacob Burns Film Center in the landmark Rome Theater, a Spanish mission-style building and one of the first movie theaters in Westchester County. The Burns Center is dedicated to presenting independent, documentary, and world cinema. Guest speakers at the Burns Center have included Jerry Lewis, Woody Allen, Jonathan Demme, Robert Klein, Oliver Stone, Stephen King, Rob Lowe and numerous other notable filmmakers and actors.

Usonia Homes, a neighborhood of 50 houses spread among 100 acres (0.40 km^{2}) of wooded hillside, was started in 1948. Three houses were designed by Frank Lloyd Wright.

Pleasantville is home to the Westchester Table Tennis Center, where over 250 members compete, practice and train for various tournaments, and now, many are even training to become olympic athletes. The Captain Lawrence Brewing Company's first brewing location was in Pleasantville.

Another addition to Pleasantville's cultural scene is the Pleasantville Music Festival, made possible by the village, over 150 volunteers and WXPK, an all-day outdoor event stage at Parkway Field on the second Saturday in July. Main stage acts have included Roger McGuinn, The Bacon Brothers, Rusted Root, Jakob Dylan, Dar Williams, Carney, Back Door Slam, Marc Cohn, Augustana, Z.Z Ward, and Joan Osborne.

Pleasantville is also home to the Pleasantville Farmers Market. Started in 1998 as one of the first markets in Westchester with a goal of breathing life into a struggling downtown, the Saturday morning market is now the largest year-round farmers market in Westchester County, attracting upwards of 3,500 people a week to shop from about 60 vendors of locally grown and produced food. The market is run by volunteers in the community as a non-profit, and it has won the readers' choice "Best of Westchester" award from Westchester Magazine for eight consecutive years, since 2014.

From 1975 to 1987, Pleasantville was home to the New York Giants Training Camp. Each summer the Giants would hold their off-season workouts and Training Camp at the Pace University Pleasantville Campus. During their time at Pleasantville, thousands would flock to camp. During their stay in Pleasantville many businesses benefited from the influx of people and many of the players would be seen at many of the restaurants and delicatessens in town.

Pleasantville is also the only place in America to have hosted a royal wedding, between Estelle Bernadotte and Count Folke Bernadotte, a duke of Sweden who rejected his claim to the crown.

The Marmaduke Forster House was added to the National Register of Historic Places in 2011.

== Geography ==
According to the United States Census Bureau, the village has a total area of 1.8 square miles (4.7 km^{2}), all land.

== Demographics ==
Historical population
Census	Pop.	Note	%±
1900	1,204		—
1910	2,207		83.3%
1920	3,590		62.7%
1930	4,540		26.5%
1940	4,454		−1.9%
1950	4,861		9.1%
1960	5,877		20.9%
1970	7,110		21.0%
1980	6,749		−5.1%
1990	6,592		−2.3%
2000	7,172		8.8%
2010	7,019		−2.1%
2020	7,513		7.0%
U.S. Decennial Census

As of the census of 2000, there were 7,172 people, 2,637 households, and 1,824 families residing in the village. The population density was 3,943.4 inhabitants per square mile (1,522.6/km^{2}). There were 2,684 housing units at an average density of 1,475.7 per square mile (569.8/km^{2}). The estimated racial makeup of the village in 2018 was 71.7% Non-Hispanic White, 90.8% White, 4.3% African American, 0% Native American, 3.1% Asian, and 1.8% from two or more races. Hispanic or Latino of any race were 18.3% of the population.

There were 2,637 households, out of which 35.2% had children under the age of 18 living with them, 58.3% were married couples living together, 7.8% had a female householder with no husband present, and 30.8% were non-families. 25.6% of all households were made up of individuals, and 10.3% had someone living alone who was 65 years of age or older. The average household size was 2.61 and the average family size was 3.16.

In the village, the population was spread out, with 28.5% under the age of 18, 4.8% from 18 to 24, 29.9% from 25 to 44, 23.5% from 45 to 64, and 13.3% who were 65 years of age or older. The median age was 38 years. For every 100 females, there were 98.3 males. For every 100 females age 18 and over, there were 91.1 males.

The median income for a household in the village was $86,632, and the median income for a family was $105,227. Males had a median income of $62,344 versus $47,978 for females. The per capita income for the village was $41,397. About 2.0% of families and 4.4% of the population were below the poverty line, including 3.0% of those under age 18 and 3.5% of those age 65 or over.

== Education ==
Most of Pleasantville is in Pleasantville Union Free School District while portions are in Mount Pleasant Central School District.

== Notable people ==
- Mark Ambor, singer-songwriter
- John Emory Andrus, politician
- Matt Ballinger, singer in the pop band Dream Street
- Dave Barry, humorist, author
- Estelle Bernadotte (1904–1984), American-Swedish countess who was a leading figure in the International Red Cross and Girl Scout movement
- Louis Biancaniello, record producer
- Nick Catalano, author
- Benjamin Cheever, author
- Chips, the most decorated war dog of World War II
- Anne Hyde Choate, early and prominent leader of the Girl Scouts
- Johnny Craig, comic book artist
- Will Englund, journalist
- Edward Gelsthorpe (1923–2009), marketing executive known as "Cranapple Ed" for his best-known product launch
- Terry George, Irish screenwriter, director
- Paul Geroski, economist
- Bill Graham (1931–1991), rock promoter
- Dashiell Hammett (1894–1961), author
- David G. Hartwell (1941–2016), science fiction critic, publisher and editor
- Lillian Hellman (1905–1984), playwright
- Otis Hill, professional basketball player, standout at Pleasantville High School and Syracuse University
- Douglas Kennedy, journalist, part of the Kennedy family
- Morgana King, singer and actress
- Boris Koutzen (1901–1966), violinist, composer, conductor of the Chappaqua Orchestra
- Brandon Larracuente, actor, known for 13 Reasons Why
- Norman Leyden, musician, arranger, composer and founder of the Westchester Youth Symphony
- Kyle Lowder, actor
- Gavin MacLeod, actor
- Sean Maher, actor
- Aaron Maine, founder, songwriter, and lead guitarist for the band Porches
- Janet Maslin, film critic
- Seabury C. Mastic, lawyer and politician
- Kurt McKinney, actor (cast member, General Hospital and Guiding Light)
- Scott Mebus, author, composer, playwright, theatrical producer
- John Nonna, Olympic fencer, mayor, and county attorney
- Stephen O'Leary Soccer player
- Scott Perlman, Hall of Fame baseball player (WRWBL)
- Sidney Poitier (1960s), actor
- Steven Clark Rockefeller
- Deion Sanders, Head Football Coach at University of Colorado, NFL Hall of Famer, 2x Super Bowl Champion, Former New York Yankee
- David Selby, actor, producer, writer
- Will Shortz, puzzle creator and editor for the New York Times
- Henry Stone, owner of TK Records
- Robert Tagliapietra, fashion designer
- DeWitt Wallace (1889–1981), magazine publisher, co-founder of Reader's Digest
- Lila Bell Wallace (née Acheson) (1890–1984), magazine publisher, co-founder of Reader's Digest
